= Mongolia–United States relations =

- Mongolia: United States

Diplomatic mission
- Embassy of Mongolia, Washington, D.C.: Embassy of the United States, Ulaanbaatar

Envoy
- Ambassador Batbayar Ulziidelger: Ambassador Richard Buangan

Bilateral relations between Mongolia and the United States formalized in 1987 with the establishment of diplomatic relations. Since then, the United States has become a key third neighbor to Mongolia, and in 2019 this relationship was upgraded to a strategic partnership. Ties focus on education, development assistance, and defense.

According to a 2010 Gallup poll, Mongolians preferred the American leadership over that of China and India, with 58% expressing approval, 5% expressing disapproval, and 37% expressing uncertainty. According to the 2012 U.S. Global Leadership Report, 44% of Mongolians approved of American leadership, with 6% disapproving, and 50% being uncertain. Gallup's 2020 polls showed Mongolia was the top country in Asia supporting the US leadership performance.

According to a 2017 survey, 82% of Mongolians have a favorable view of the United States (23% "strongly" and 59% "somewhat" favorable), with 10% expressing a negative view (1% "strongly" and 9% "somewhat" unfavorable).

== History ==
=== Early relations ===
Several American travelers and traders visited Mongolia in the 19th century, then under Qing rule. The earliest example is dated to 1862, when an American and French traveler were given a travel pass permitting them to transit Mongolia. Travelers included the journalist Thomas W. Knox, diplomat William Woodville Rockhill, as well as the then-engineer and future president Herbert Hoover, the latter of which met the future Bogd Khan in about 1899. The amount of Americans traveling to Urga (modern day Ulaanbaatar) became so frequent in the early 20th century that an area in the city with a number of American businesses became known as the American Denj (denj referring to a hill) starting around 1909.

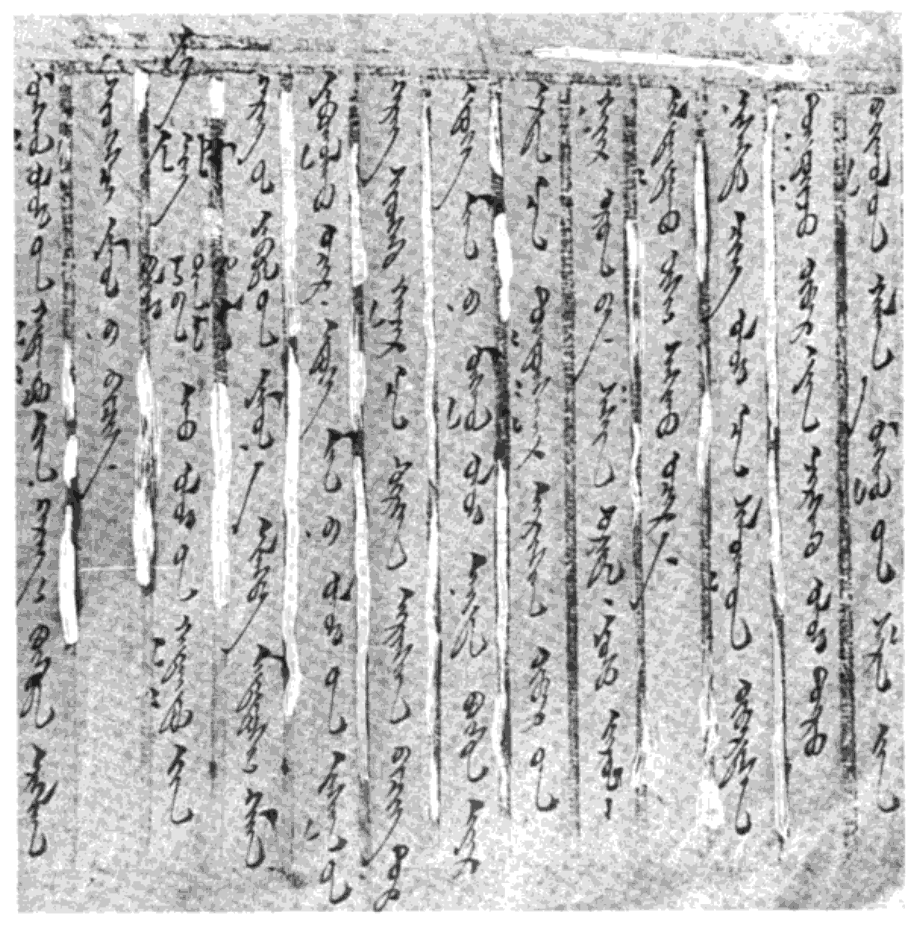
Letter proclaiming independence sent to the foreign ministries of France, England, Germany, the United States, Belgium, Japan, Denmark, Holland, and Austria

After Mongolia declared independence in 1911, the new government headed by the Bogd Khan sent letters of independence containing requests for recognition to a number of consulates stationed in Harbin, including that of the United States, addressing them as the Great Mei (Chinese: 美). While the United States did not recognize Mongolia's independence at this time, it did open a consulate in Kalgan, Inner Mongolia (now Zhangjiakou), partially to promote the interests of Americans in Inner and Outer Mongolia. The consulate was housed in a building leased from Frans August Larson, and opened on 1 April 1921, the same year of the communist revolution of 1921. The first consul appointed to Kalgan, Samuel Sokobin, visited Ulaanbaatar and met with prime minister Dogsomyn Bodoo several times, who wrote an article for The Nation magazine in November 1921. Another prime minister with ties to the United States was Soliin Danzan, who represented the "American-Mongolian automobile company". The explorer Roy Chapman Andrews mounted a series of expeditions to Mongolia from 1922–1930. By the late 1920s, however, Mongolia had fallen firmly under the Soviet orbit and hopes for expanded relations were dashed.

Henry A. Wallace became the first sitting vice president to visit Mongolia in 1944. After World War II some American politicians started to call for recognition of Mongolia's independence, including Mike Mansfield, who endorsed recognition in the 1940s, and whose 1960 speech from the floor of the Senate served as a catalyst for US acquiescence to Mongolia's admittance to the United Nations in 1961. The United States abstained during the motion, having previously voiced opposition to Mongolia's inclusion in 1946 and 1947. President John F. Kennedy floated the idea of recognizing Mongolia in 1962, though this was opposed by Chiang Kai-shek's nationalist government in China, who continued to claim Mongolia, and whose government was recognized by the United States as controlling mainland China.

Though various diplomatic overtures from both the Mongolian and American sides were made in the 1960s to 1970s, it was not until the 1980s and a liberalization process happening in the Soviet Union and Mongolia that meant that more dialogue was possible between the two sides. After contacts between diplomats in Tokyo and New York, 1986 the Mongolian ambassador to the United Nations Gendengiin Nyamdoo and US Deputy Assistant Secretary of State for East Asia J. Stapleton Roy met and exchanged notes on a diplomatic framework for recognition and relations, agreeing on a date for formal establishment of ties.

=== Modern era ===
The United States recognized and established official relations with Mongolia on January 27, 1987, becoming the 100th or 101st country to do so. The documents were signed by Nyamdoo and U.S. Secretary of State George Shultz in the White House Treaty Room.

The U.S. Embassy in Ulaanbaatar was established in April 1988, with the first U.S. ambassador to Mongolia Richard L. Williams presenting his credentials to Mongolian chairman Jambyn Batmönkh in September 1988.

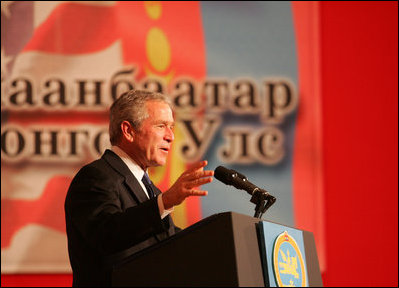
George W. Bush during a visit in November 2005

Williams was non-resident, with Joseph E. Lake, the first resident ambassador, arriving in July 1990. Secretary of State James Baker visited Mongolia in August 1990, and again in July 1991. Mongolia accredited its first ambassador to the United States in March 1989, the former ambassador to the United Nations Gendengiin Nyamdoo. Punsalmaagiin Ochirbat became the first Mongolian leader to visit the United States in January 1991.

In 1989 and 1990, a cultural accord, Peace Corps accord, consular convention, and Overseas Private Investment Corporation (OPIC) agreement were signed. A trade agreement was signed in January 1991 and a bilateral investment treaty in 1994. Mongolia was granted permanent normal trade relations (NTR) status and Generalized System of Preferences (GSP) eligibility in June 1999.

Secretary of State Madeleine Albright visited Mongolia in May 1998, and Prime Minister Nambaryn Enkhbayar visited the American capital Washington, D.C. in November 2001. Deputy Secretary of State Richard L. Armitage visited Mongolia in January 2004, and Mongolian President Natsagiin Bagabandi came to Washington for a meeting with President George W. Bush in July 2004. President Bush, First Lady Laura Bush, and Secretary of State Condoleezza Rice visited Mongolia in November 2005. Defense Secretary Donald Rumsfeld visited in October 2005 and Speaker of the House of Representatives Dennis Hastert visited Mongolia in August 2005. Agriculture Secretary Mike Johanns led a presidential delegation in July 2006 in conjunction with Mongolia's celebration of its 800th anniversary. President Enkhbayar visited the White House in October 2007 and the two Presidents signed the Millennium Challenge Compact for Mongolia.

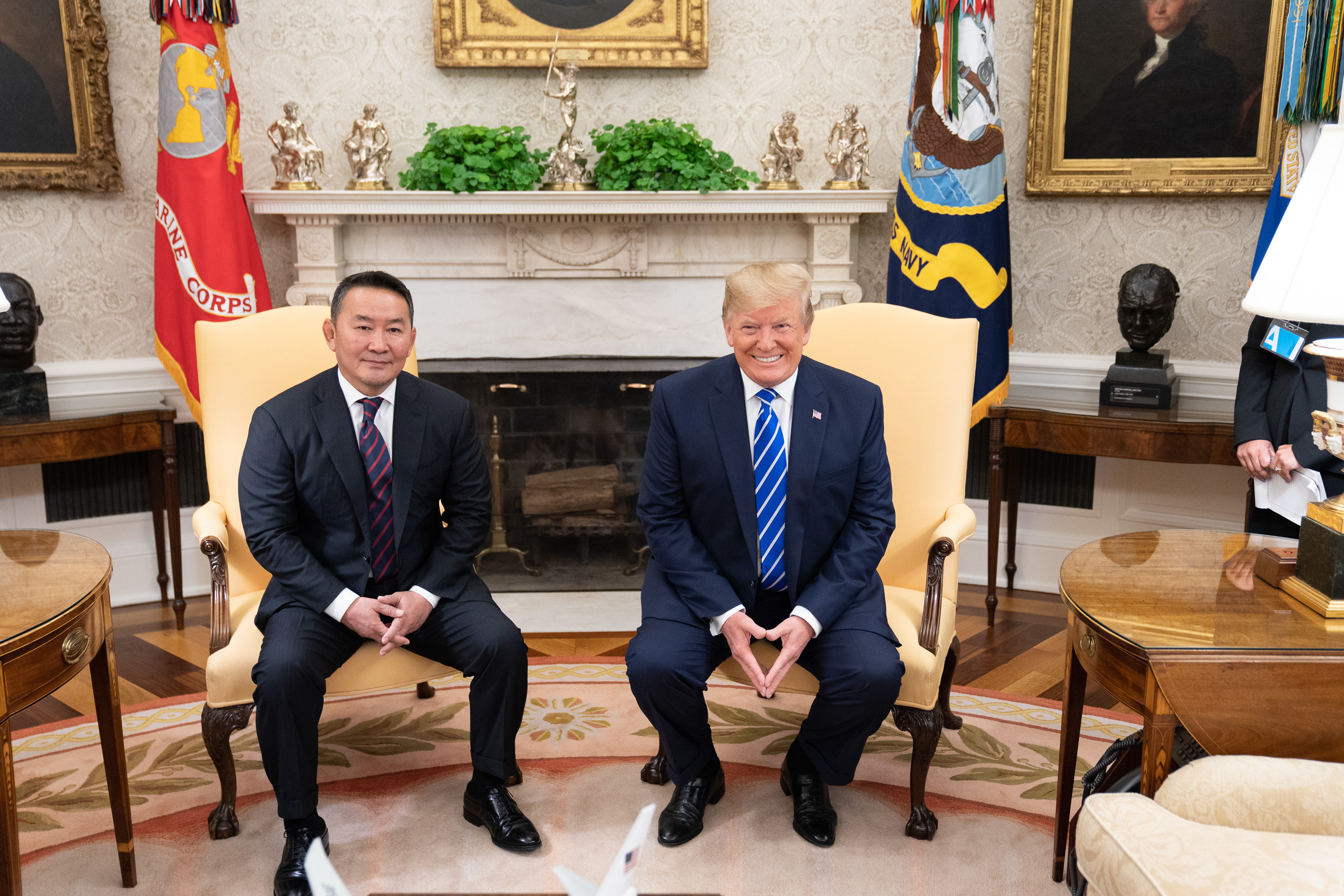
President Donald Trump meets with Mongolian President Khaltmaagiin Battulga meeting in the Oval Office of the White House in July 2019.

In July 2004, the U.S. signed a Trade and Investment Framework Agreement with Mongolia to promote economic reform and more foreign investment. In July 2007, six members of the U.S. House of Representatives visited Mongolia to inaugurate an exchange program between lawmakers of the two countries. The return visit came in August 2007, with five members of the Mongolian Parliament traveling to the U.S. In September 2007, the White House announced the proposed creation of an Asia-Pacific Democracy Partnership, in which Mongolia was invited to take part. The initiative is aimed at providing a venue in which free nations can work together to support democratic values, strengthen democratic institutions, and assist those who are working to build and sustain free societies.

In August 2011, on a side trip while traveling to China and Japan, Joe Biden made the first visit by a sitting vice president to Mongolia since 1944.

In July 2019 the two countries declared a Strategic Partnership during President Khaltmaagiin Battulga's meeting with President Donald Trump.

During the COVID-19 pandemic, in 2020 the U.S. government provided 1.2 million USD in aid through USAID, the WHO, and UNICEF to support the Mongolian government's response to the COVID-19 pandemic. Mongolia delivered 60,000 pieces of personal protective equipment to the Navajo Nation in 2020, this becoming the first non-stop flight between the two countries.

In early 2021, it was found in a declassified secret document that Mongolia holds a strategic importance to the US in advancing the Indo-Pacific region.

In February 2023 the two countries signed an Open Skies Agreement in early 2023 paving the way for non-stop flights.

=== High level visits ===
| Date | Person | Office | Location |
|---|---|---|---|
| July 1944 | Henry A. Wallace | Vice President of the United States | Ulaanbaatar |
| May 1990 | Dashiin Byambasüren | Prime Minister of Mongolia | Washington, D.C. |
| August 1990 | James Baker | United States Secretary of State | Ulaanbaatar |
| January 22 – 24, 1991 | Punsalmaagiin Ochirbat | President of Mongolia | Washington, D.C. |
| July 1991 | James Baker | United States Secretary of State | Ulaanbaatar |
| May 1998 | Madeleine Albright | United States Secretary of State | Ulaanbaatar |
| November 2001 | Nambaryn Enkhbayar | Prime Minister of Mongolia | Washington, D.C. |
| July 14 – 21, 2004 | Natsagiin Bagabandi | President of Mongolia | Washington, D.C. |
| November 21, 2005 | George W. Bush | President of the United States | Ulaanbaatar |
| October 21 – 23, 2007 | Nambaryn Enkhbayar | President of Mongolia | Washington, D.C. |
| June 16, 2011 | Tsakhiagiin Elbegdorj | President of Mongolia | Washington, D.C. |
| August 22, 2011 | Joe Biden | Vice President of the United States | Ulaanbaatar |
| July 9, 2012 | Hillary Clinton | United States Secretary of State | Ulaanbaatar |
| September 2018 | Ukhnaagiin Khürelsükh | Prime Minister of Mongolia | Washington, D.C. |
| July 30 – August 2, 2019 | Khaltmaagiin Battulga | President of Mongolia | Washington, D.C. |
| August 2 – 6, 2023 | Luvsannamsrain Oyun-Erdene | Prime Minister of Mongolia | Washington, D.C. |

== Development assistance ==
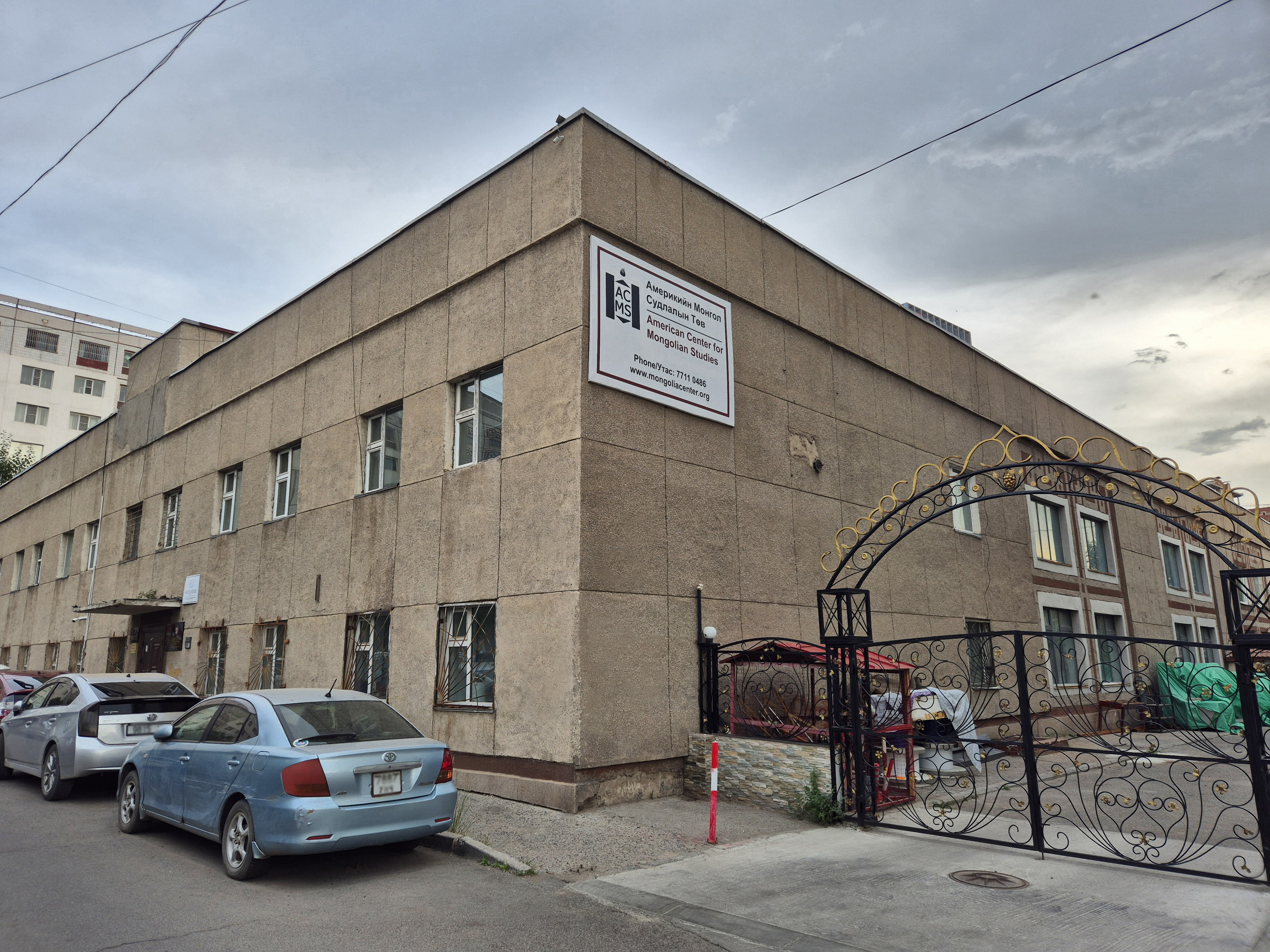
The American Center for Mongolian Studies in Ulaanbaatar

The U.S. Agency for International Development (USAID) plays a leading role in providing bilateral development assistance to Mongolia, focusing on economic growth and good governance. Total USAID grant funding to Mongolia from 1991 through 2011 was about $220 million.

In most years since 1993, the United States Department of Agriculture has provided food aid to Mongolia under the Food for Progress and 416(b) programs. The monetized proceeds of the food aid ($4.2 million in 2006) are currently used to support programs bolstering entrepreneurship, herder livelihood diversification, and better veterinary services.

The Peace Corps started operations in Mongolia in July 1991 with a cohort of 21 volunteers. The program primarily deals with English teaching and community development activities.

The Millennium Challenge Corporation signed a Compact with Mongolia in October 2007. By the end of the compact in September 2013, the Government of Mongolia and MCC had spent 94 percent of the anticipated compact funds to increase land security, reduce impacts of non-communicable diseases and injuries, provide enhanced vocational training, expand distribution of energy-efficient household products, and construct roads for commercial traffic. The Government of Mongolia and MCC expect more than 2 million people to benefit from the investments over the 20-year lifetime of the investment. In December 2014, the MCC Board of Directors selected Mongolia for the development of a second compact. Currently, MCC and Mongolian officials are conducting an analysis of the country's economy and constraints to growth.

== Defense ==
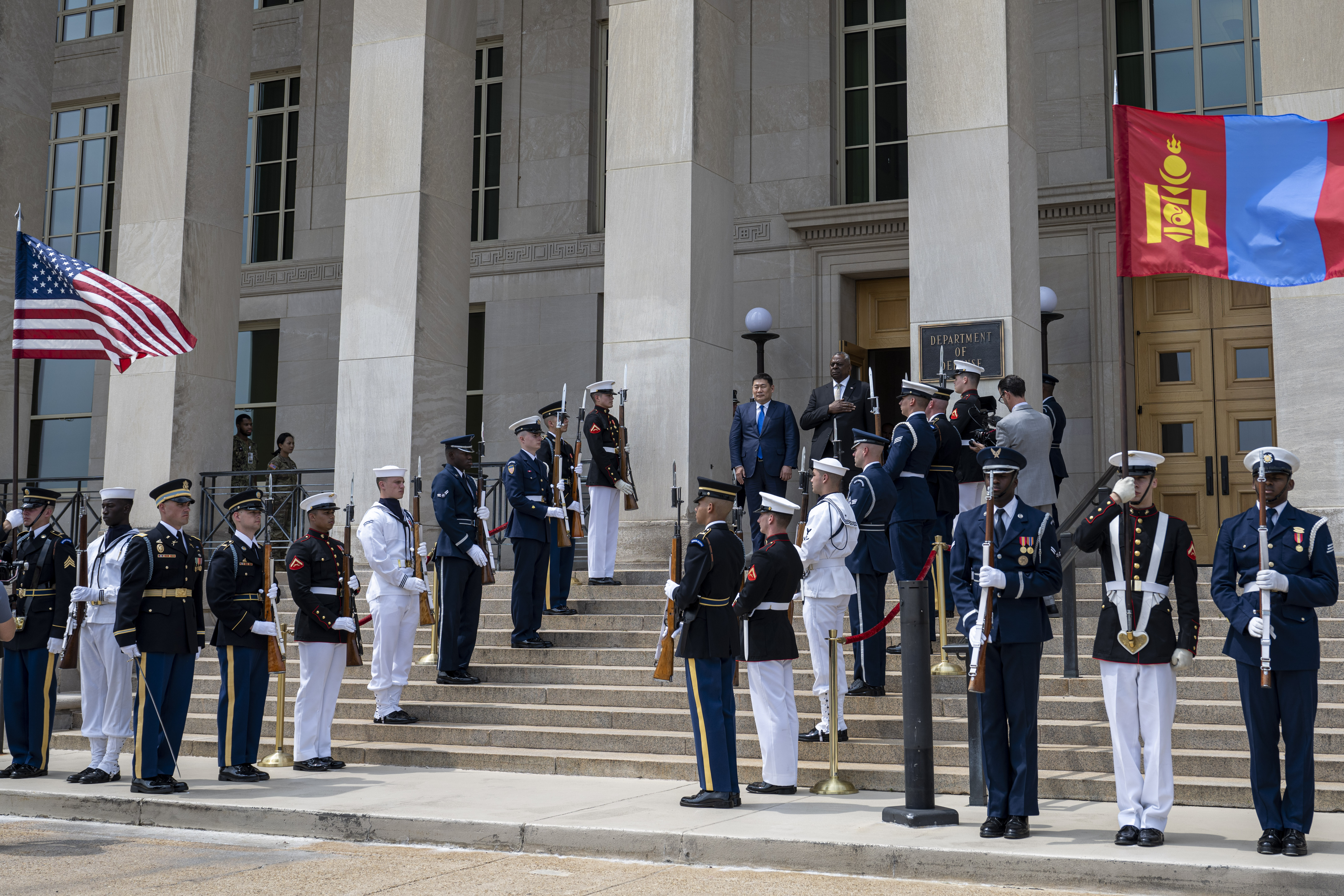
US Secretary of Defense Lloyd Austin and Mongolian Prime Minister Luvsannamsrain Oyun-Erdene at a bilateral exchange at The Pentagon, 2023

Mongolia contributed personnel to the U.S.-led Iraq War as part of Multi-National Force – Iraq in 2003 and has contributed to NATO-led operations in Kosovo from 2005–2007 and the International Security Assistance Force in Afghanistan from 2009–2014. Mongolia was recognized as a NATO global partner in 2012.

The two countries jointly participate in two annual military exercises hosted in Mongolia, Khaan Quest and Gobi Wolf. Khaan Quest, the Asian region's premier peacekeeping exercise, initially started in May 2023 as a bilateral exercise between the United States Marine Corps and Mongolian Armed Forces, and became a multinational exercise starting 2006. Gobi Wolf focuses on domestic disaster preparedness, and was launched in March 2009.

== Migration ==
Some immigrants came from Mongolia to the United States as early as 1949, spurred by religious persecution in their homeland. The 2020 Mongolian National Census reported 19,170 Mongolian citizens as residing in the United States, while the Pew Research Center estimated 27,000 people of Mongolian ancestry living in the United States in 2019.

As of 2014, there were 1,444 international students of Mongolian origin studying in the United States.

== Economic interests ==
As of 2022, total bilateral trade between the two countries was $175 million, with U.S. exports totaling 149 million and Mongolian exports totaling $26 million.

Accredited by the United States Chamber of Commerce, the American Chamber of Commerce in Mongolia works to promote business ties between the two countries.

== Diplomatic missions ==
The current Ambassador to Mongolia is Richard Buangan, who was appointed by then-President Joe Biden on November 17, 2022. The current Ambassador to the United States is Batbayar Ulziidelger, who presented diplomatic credentials on December 1, 2021.

Mongolia maintains an embassy in Washington, D.C. and Consulate Generals in San Francisco and Chicago. The United States maintains an embassy in Ulaanbaatar.

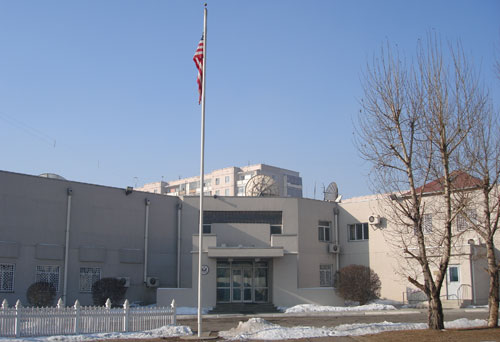
Embassy of the United States, Ulaanbaatar

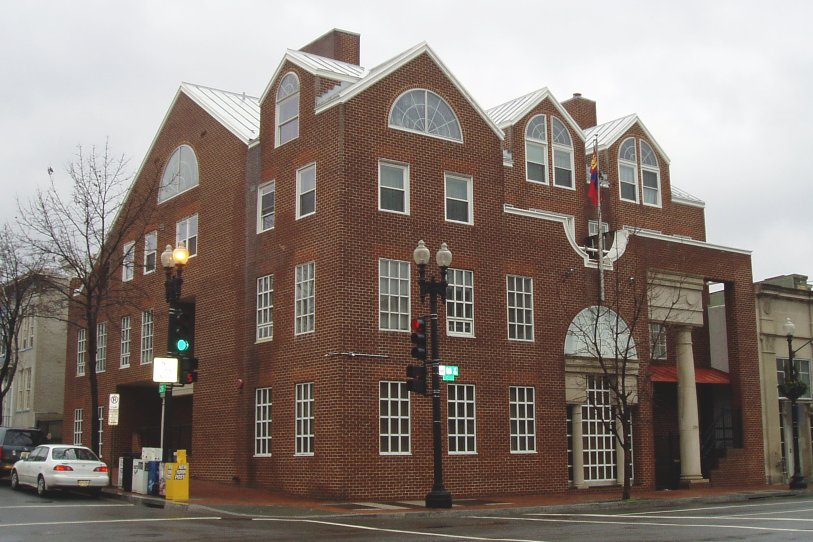
Embassy of Mongolia, Washington, D.C.

== See also ==
- Diluwa Khutugtu Jamsrangjab
- John Gombojab Hangin
