= List of ambassadors of the United States to Mongolia =

Ambassador of the United States to Mongolia
- Seal of the United States Department of State

- Flag of a United States ambassador

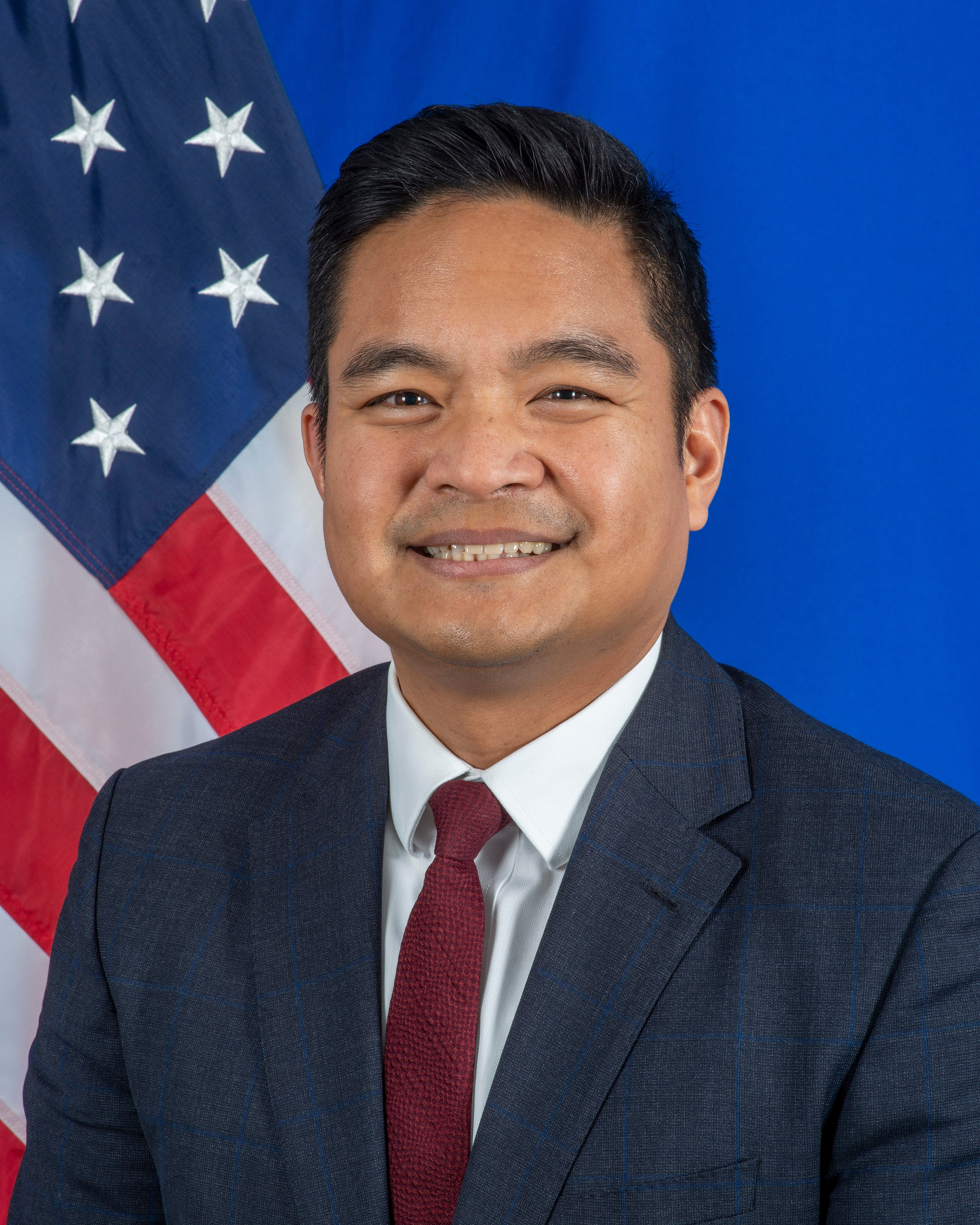
- Incumbent; Richard L. Buangan since November 17, 2022
- Nominator: The president of the United States
- Appointer: The president with Senate advice and consent
- Inaugural holder: Steven Mann as Chargé d'Affaires ad interim
- Formation: April 17, 1988
- Website: U.S. Embassy - Ulaanbaatar

This is a list of United States ambassadors to Mongolia. The United States established diplomatic relations with then-People's Republic of Mongolia on January 27, 1987. The embassy in Ulaanbaatar was opened Apr 17, 1988, with Steven Mann as Chargé d'Affaires ad interim. Richard Llewellyn Williams was the first ambassador to the Republic, and resided in the District of Columbia. The U.S. maintains its embassy in Ulaanbaatar.

== Ambassadors ==
Name	Portrait	Career status	Presentation of credentials	Termination of mission	Comment
Richard Llewellyn Williams		Foreign Service officer	11-Jul-1988	27-June-1990	
Joseph Edward Lake		Foreign Service officer	27-June-1990	30-Aug-1993	
Donald C. Johnson		Foreign Service officer	02-Aug-1993	16-Aug-1996	
Llewellyn Hedgbeth		Foreign Service officer	Aug-26-1996	Dec-1997	Chargé d'Affaires ad interim
Alphonse F. La Porta		Foreign Service officer	24-Oct-1997	03-Nov-2000	
John R. Dinger		Foreign Service officer	14-Jun-2000	20-Jan-2003	
Pamela J. H. Slutz		Foreign Service officer	04-Sep-2003	08-Sep-2006	
Mark C. Minton		Foreign Service officer	20-Sep-2006	21-Sep-2009	
Jonathan Addleton		Foreign Service officer	09-Nov-2009	1-Aug-2012	
Piper Campbell		Foreign Service officer	24-Aug-2012	07-Aug-2015	
Jennifer Zimdahl Galt		Foreign Service officer	05-Oct-2015	10-Nov-2017	
Michael S. Klecheski		Foreign Service officer	22-Feb-2019	24-Sep-2022	
Richard L. Buangan		Foreign Service Officer	November 17, 2022	Present	

== See also ==
- Mongolia – United States relations
- Foreign relations of Mongolia
- Ambassadors of the United States
- List of ambassadors of Mongolia to the United States
