= Pamela J. H. Slutz =

American diplomat (born 1949)

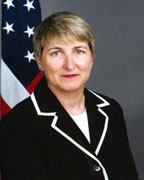

United States Ambassador to Burundi
- In office 2009–2012
- President: Barack Obama
- Preceded by: Patricia Moller
- Succeeded by: Dawn M. Liberi

United States Ambassador to Mongolia
- In office 2003–2006
- President: George W. Bush
- Preceded by: John R. Dinger
- Succeeded by: Mark C. Minton

Personal details
- Born: January 13, 1949 (age 77) Chicago, Illinois, U.S.
- Spouse: Ronald J. Deutch
- Profession: Diplomat, Ambassador

Pamela Jo Howell Slutz (born January 13, 1949) was a career member of the United States Foreign Service who served as U.S. Ambassador to Burundi, and as U.S. Ambassador to Mongolia. Over the course of her career, she has also served in various diplomatic posts in Kenya, Taiwan, Indonesia, and China. She was the recipient of two U.S. Department of State Superior Honor Awards and the Presidential Rank Award of Meritorious Executive. After retiring in 2012, Slutz continued to work part-time for the Office of the Inspector General, U.S. Department of State. From 2019 to 2024 she served as president of The Mongolia Society.

== Early life and education ==
Born in Chicago, Illinois, Pamela Slutz moved to Washington when her father joined the United States Department of State Bureau of Intelligence and Research in 1952. Her father, Robert Fleming Slutz Jr., joined the Foreign Service and was posted overseas. From the ages of 7 to 15, Pamela attended the International School Bangkok in Thailand. During her college years, she visited her parents in Indonesia. A native English speaker, her second languages include French, Indonesian, and Mandarin.

Pamela Slutz is an alumna of Hollins University (BA, Politics 1970) where she participated in the Hollins Abroad Program in Paris in 1968–69. She also holds an MA in Asian Studies with specialization in Indonesian studies (1972) from the University of Hawai'i, where she was an East–West Center Fellow. She is the recipient of the Hollins University Distinguished Alumnae Award (2010). As one of fifty East-West Center alumni featured in the Center's Fiftieth Anniversary publication, "50 Years, 50 Stories", Slutz was quoted as saying, "My heart has always been in Asia."

== Career ==
After joining the U.S. Department of State in 1981, she served overseas at U.S. embassies in Kinshasa, Zaire (now the Democratic Republic of the Congo) (1982–84) and Jakarta, Indonesia (1984–87). She worked in the U.S. Department of State's Bureau of Political Military Affairs from 1987 to 1989, where she served as a member of the U.S. Delegation to the Nuclear and Space Talks with the USSR in Geneva. In 1988–1989, Slutz was nominated by the State Department to be an MIT Seminar XXI Fellow.

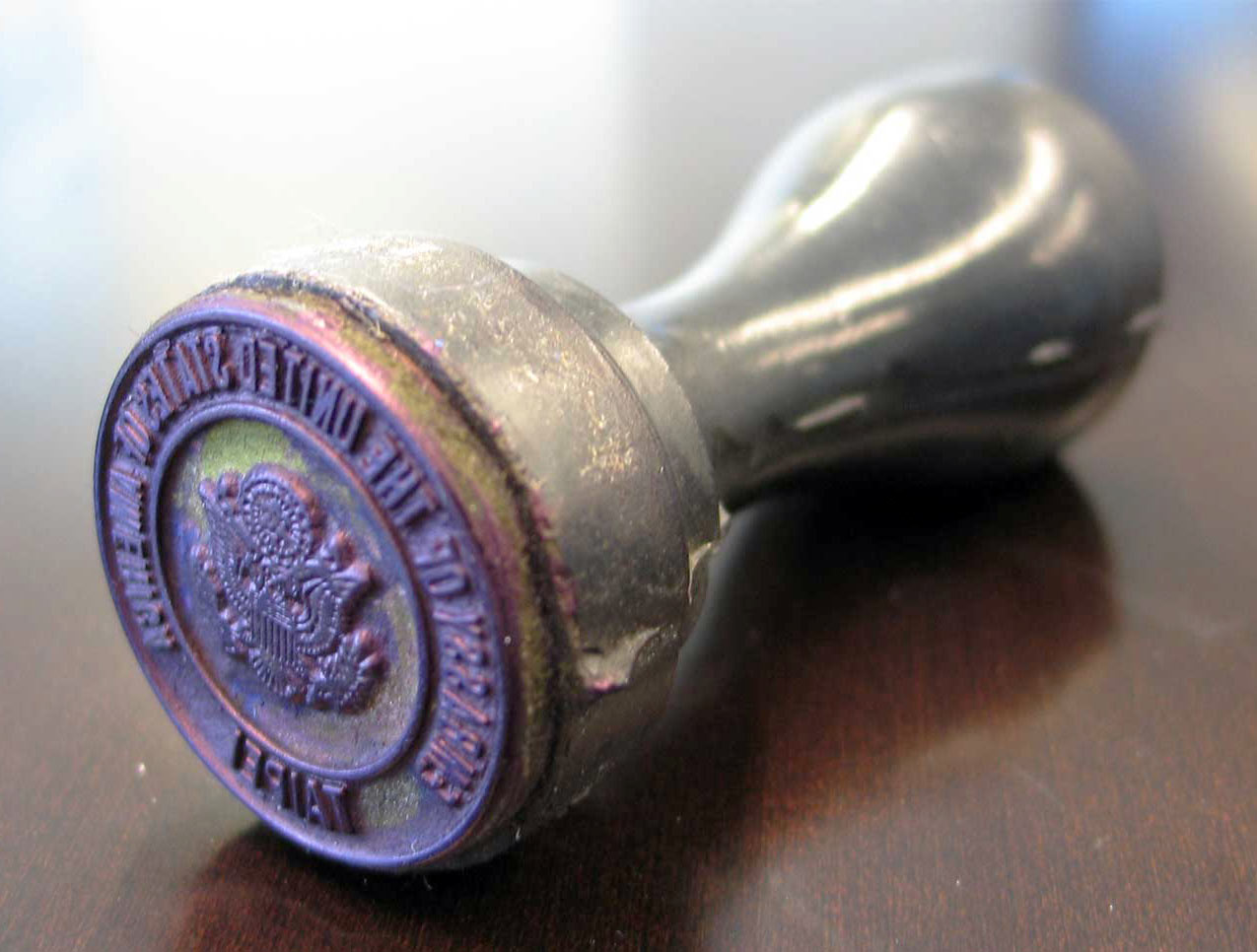
The stamp from the former U.S. Embassy in Taipei was donated by Slutz to the National Museum of American Diplomacy

From 1991 to 1994 she was assigned to the U.S. Consulate General in Shanghai, where she was Acting Consul General from May to October 1994. From 1995 to 1997 she was deputy director of the U.S. Department of State Office of Chinese and Mongolian Affairs, the first woman to hold that position. Between 1997 and 1999 she was director of the Office of Regional and Security Policy in the Bureau of East Asian and Pacific Affairs. She returned to Jakarta, Indonesia for a second tour as the Chief of the Political Section (1999–2001). She was Acting Director of the American Institute in Taiwan, Taipei from 2001 to 2002, and Deputy Director until 2003, the first woman to hold those positions.

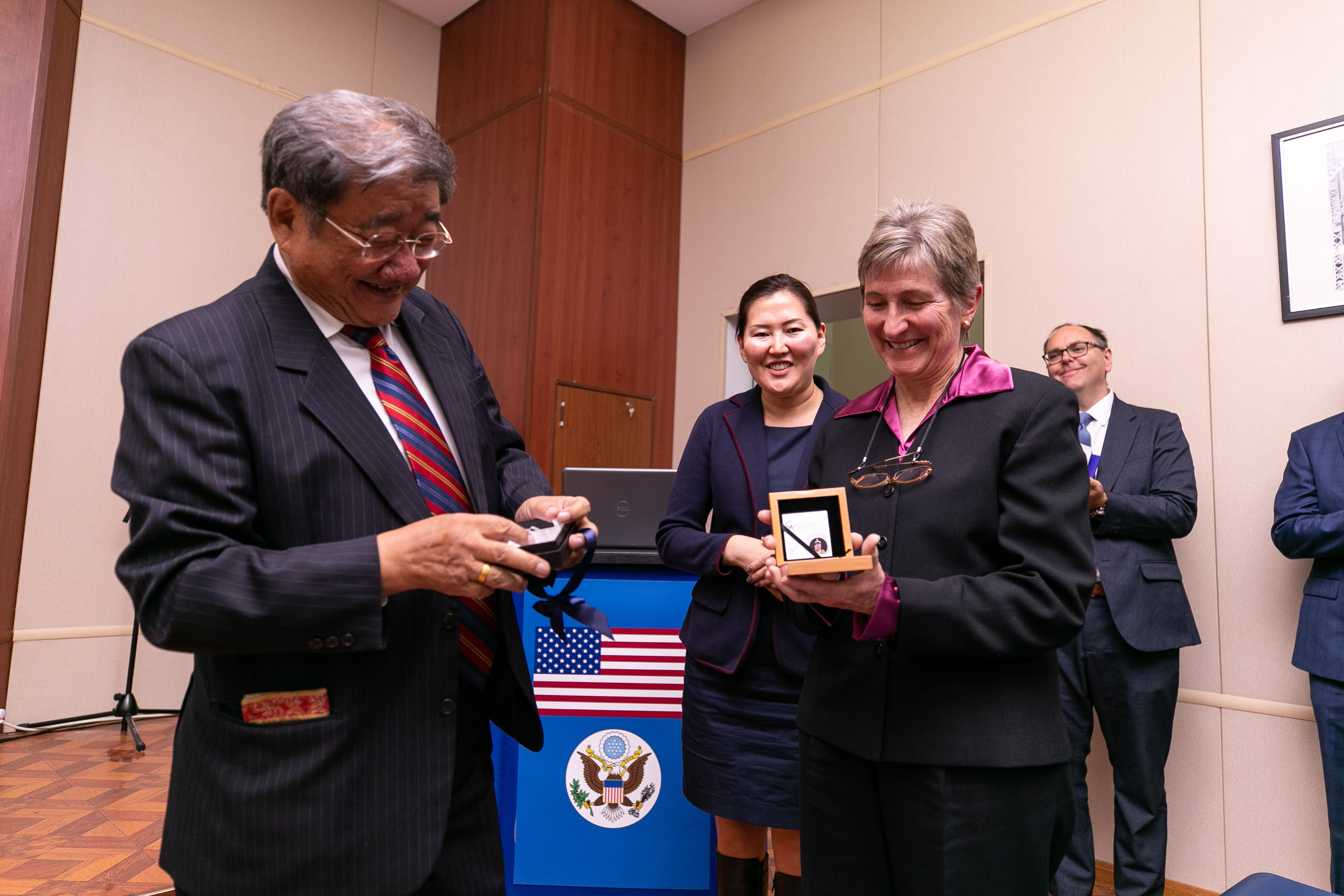
Slutz with former President Punsalmaagiin Ochirbat in 2018

President George W. Bush nominated her to be U.S. Ambassador to Mongolia (2003–2006), the first woman to hold that position. As Ambassador to Mongolia, Slutz hosted the first-ever visits to Mongolia by a sitting president and first lady (President and Mrs. George W. Bush). She also hosted the first-ever visits to Mongolia by a secretary of defense (Donald Rumsfeld), and a speaker of the House (Dennis Hastert) — and the second-ever visit by a secretary of state (Condoleezza Rice). In addition, she was instrumental in channeling assistance to the first-ever shelter for abused women in Ulaanbaatar, advocated for Mongolia to reduce its dependence on foreign aid, and shared the nature of Mongolia and North Korea interactions. In April 2015, Slutz was awarded the Order of the Polar Star, the highest honor bestowed on non-Mongolian citizens by the President of Mongolia.

Slutz then served as Deputy Chief of Mission at the U.S. Embassy in Nairobi, Kenya (2006–2009). While posted in Nairobi, she climbed to the summit of Mount Kenya. She was then nominated by President Barack Obama to be the U.S. Ambassador to Burundi (2009–2012). In mid-2010, Slutz and her embassy staff supported and monitored the first democratic elections in Burundi since 1993.

She was the recipient of the Presidential Rank Award for Meritorious Executive (2011) and two Department of State Superior Honor Awards (1999 and 2009). After retiring, Slutz served on the board of directors of the North America-Mongolia Business Council (NAMBC), including as its chairman from 2013–2016; and, in March 2019, was elected President of The Mongolia Society.

== Personal life ==
Slutz is married to Ronald J. Deutch, a retired Foreign Service Officer.

== Selected publications ==
- Freeman, Patrick J.; Slutz, Pamela J. H. (October 2006). "Mongolia at 800: A New Era on the Steppe". State Magazine. p. 15. Retrieved 2002-06-06.
- Slutz, Pamela J.; Goldbeck, Brian J. (August 2020). "President Bush's 2005 Mongolia Visit | American Diplomacy Est 1996". American Diplomacy.

Diplomatic posts
Preceded by John R. Dinger	U.S. Ambassador to Mongolia; 2003–2006	Succeeded by Mark C. Minton
Preceded by Patricia Moller	U.S. Ambassador to Burundi; 2009–2012	Succeeded by Dawn M. Liberi
