= List of ambassadors of the United States to Burundi =

Ambassador of the United States to Burundi
- Seal of the United States Department of State

- Flag of a United States ambassador

- Incumbent; Tim Sikes; Chargé d'affaires since September 30, 2026
- Nominator: The president of the United States
- Appointer: The president; with Senate advice and consent
- Inaugural holder: Donald A. Dumont as Envoy Extraordinary and Minister Plenipotentiary
- Formation: October 25, 1962
- Website: U.S. Embassy - Bujumbura

The United States ambassador to Burundi is the official representative of the president of the United States to the head of state of Burundi.

Until 1962 Burundi had been a part of the United Nations Trust Territory of Ruanda-Urundi under the trusteeship of Belgium. In June 1962 the UN General Assembly terminated the Belgian trusteeship and granted full independence to Rwanda and Burundi. The United States immediately recognized the Burundian government and moved to establish diplomatic relations. The U.S. Embassy in the capital Usumbura (now Bujumbura) was established on July 1, 1962, with Herbert V. Olds as Chargé d'Affaires ad interim. Donald A. Dumont was appointed as Envoy Extraordinary and Minister Plenipotentiary to Burundi on October 25, 1962.

The rank of the mission was changed to Legation effective December 15, 1962, and to Embassy again effective September 16, 1963.

== Ambassadors ==
Name	Title	Appointed	Presented credentials	Terminated mission	Notes
Donald A. Dumont – Career FSO	Envoy Extraordinary and Minister Plenipotentiary	October 25, 1962	January 17, 1963	August 1, 1963	Dumont was promoted to Ambassador Extraordinary and Plenipotentiary on August 1, 1963. This required a new commission.
Donald A. Dumont – Career FSO	Ambassador Extraordinary and Plenipotentiary	August 1, 1963	September 16, 1963	January 10, 1966	Recall requested by Govt. of Burundi, December 29, 1965
George W. Renchard – Career FSO	Ambassador Extraordinary and Plenipotentiary	July 24, 1968	August 10, 1968	October 15, 1969	
Thomas Patrick Melady – Political appointee	Ambassador Extraordinary and Plenipotentiary	November 4, 1969	January 31, 1970	May 25, 1972	
Robert L. Yost – Career FSO	Ambassador Extraordinary and Plenipotentiary	June 27, 1972	August 19, 1972	May 26, 1974	
David E. Mark – Career FSO	Ambassador Extraordinary and Plenipotentiary	June 20, 1974	September 4, 1974	August 26, 1977	
Thomas J. Corcoran – Career FSO	Ambassador Extraordinary and Plenipotentiary	March 2, 1978	April 6, 1978	August 19, 1980	
Frances D. Cook – Career FSO	Ambassador Extraordinary and Plenipotentiary	June 30, 1980	September 25, 1980	March 15, 1983	
James R. Bullington – Career FSO	Ambassador Extraordinary and Plenipotentiary	March 13, 1983	April 14, 1983	July 11, 1986	
James Daniel Phillips – Career FSO	Ambassador Extraordinary and Plenipotentiary	October 16, 1986	November 20, 1986	January 12, 1990	
Cynthia Shepard Perry – Political appointee	Ambassador Extraordinary and Plenipotentiary	November 21, 1989	February 12, 1990	February 28, 1993	The post was vacant from March 1993 to June 1994. Leonard J. Lange, Career FSO, served as chargé d'affaires ad interim during that period.
Robert Krueger – Political appointee	Ambassador Extraordinary and Plenipotentiary	May 9, 1994	June 29, 1994	September 10, 1995	
Morris N. Hughes, Jr. – Career FSO	Ambassador Extraordinary and Plenipotentiary	June 11, 1996	June 27, 1996	May 14, 1999	
Mary Carlin Yates – Career FSO	Ambassador Extraordinary and Plenipotentiary	November 16, 1999	December 15, 1999	June 19, 2002	
James Howard Yellin – Career FSO	Ambassador Extraordinary and Plenipotentiary	August 8, 2002	September 26, 2002	July 21, 2005	
Patricia Moller – Career FSO	Ambassador Extraordinary and Plenipotentiary	October 27, 2005	March 31, 2006	June 29, 2009	
Pamela J. H. Slutz - Career FSO	Ambassador Extraordinary and Plenipotentiary	November 2, 2009	December 11, 2009	February 22, 2012	
Dawn M. Liberi – Career FSO	Ambassador Extraordinary and Plenipotentiary	October 19, 2012	January 18, 2013	July 24, 2016	
Anne S. Casper – Career FSO	Ambassador Extraordinary and Plenipotentiary	May 18, 2016	October 20, 2016	May 5, 2019	
Eunice Reddick – Career FSO	Chargé d'Affairs ad interim	May 5, 2019		March 2, 2021	
Melanie Harris Higgins – Career FSO	Ambassador Extraordinary and Plenipotentiary	November 18, 2020	March 2, 2021	July 13, 2023	
Keith R. Gilges – Career FSO	Chargé d'Affairs ad interim	July 14, 2023		May 2024	
David Dale Reimer - Career FSO	Chargé d'Affairs ad interim	May 2024		June 21, 2024	
Lisa J. Peterson - Career FSO	Ambassador Extraordinary and Plenipotentiary	May 2, 2024	June 27, 2024	January 18, 2026	
Amy Davison - Career FSO	Chargé d'Affairs ad interim	January 19, 2026		June 2, 2026	
Bridget Premont - Career FSO	Chargé d'Affairs ad interim	June 9, 2026		September 29, 2026	
Tim Sikes - Career FSO	Chargé d'Affairs ad interim	September 30, 2026		Present	

== See also ==
- Burundi – United States relations
- Foreign relations of Burundi
- Ambassadors from the United States
