= Melanie Harris Higgins =

American government official and diplomat

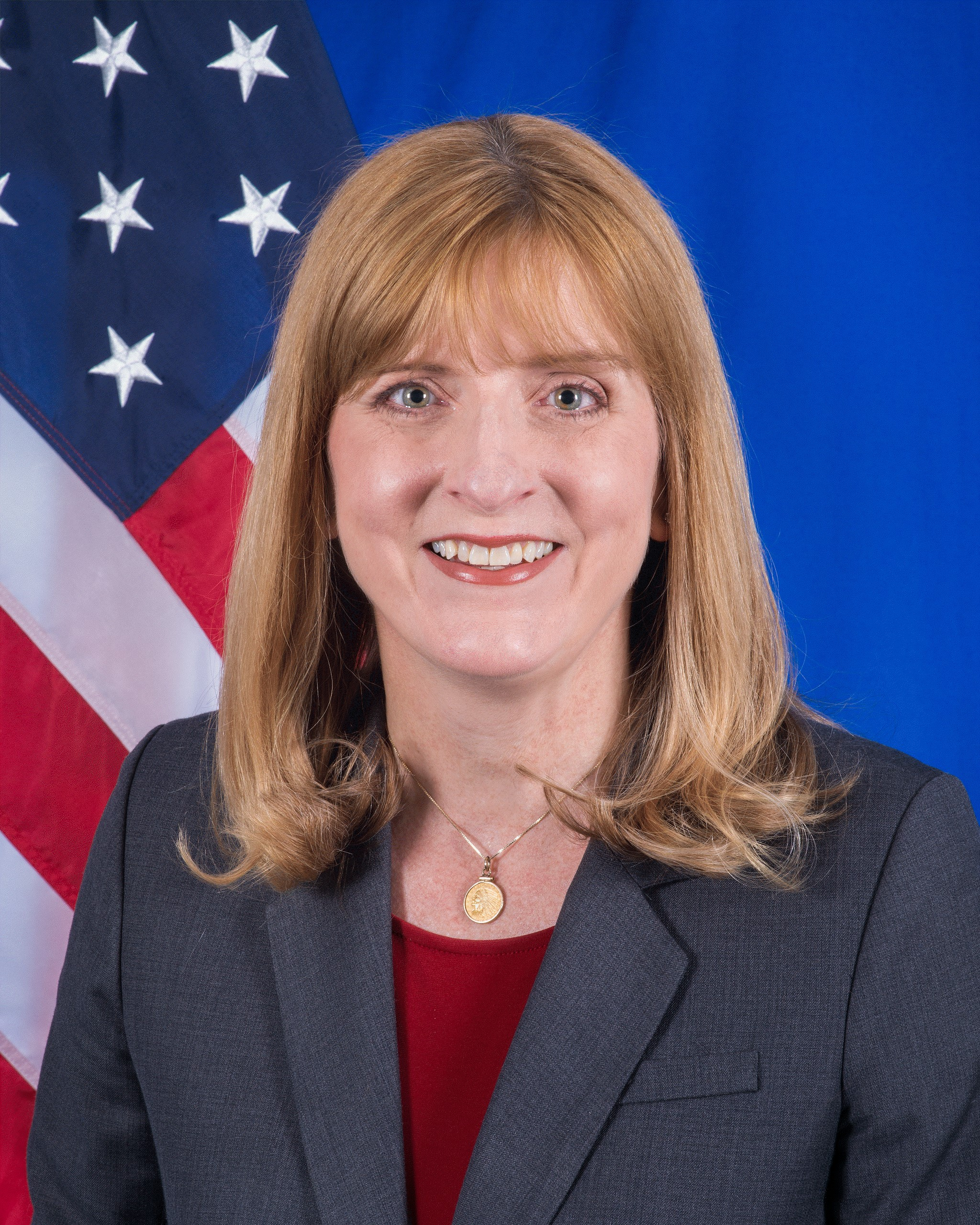

United States Ambassador to Burundi
- In office March 2, 2021 – July 13, 2023
- Nominated by: Donald Trump
- Appointed by: Joe Biden
- Preceded by: Anne Casper; Eunice Reddick (Chargé d’Affaires)
- Succeeded by: Keith R. Gilges (Chargé d’Affaires)

Personal details
- Education: Johns Hopkins University (BA); Paul H. Nitze School of Advanced International Studies (MA)

Melanie Harris Higgins is an American official and diplomat who served as the United States ambassador to Burundi from March 2, 2021 to July 13, 2023.

== Education ==
Higgins earned a Bachelor of Arts from Johns Hopkins University and a Master of Arts from the Paul H. Nitze School of Advanced International Studies.

== Career ==
Higgins is a career member of the Senior Foreign Service, class of Counselor. During her two decades of service, Higgins served as the Acting Director and Acting Public Affairs Advisor for the State Department's Bureau of East Asian and Pacific Affairs. She also held a number of other positions at the State Department in Washington, D.C., Jakarta, Indonesia, Canberra, Australia, and Yaounde, Cameroon. She has served as the Principal Officer of the United States Consulate General in Auckland, New Zealand and was the Deputy Chief of Mission of the United States Embassy in Port Moresby, Papua New Guinea. She currently serves as Director of the Office of Central African Affairs at the State Department.

=== United States ambassador to Burundi ===
On May 1, 2020, President Donald Trump announced his intent to nominate Higgins to be the next United States ambassador to Burundi. On May 19, 2020, her nomination was sent to the Senate. On November 18, 2020, her nomination was confirmed in the United States Senate by voice vote. She took the oath of office on January 13, 2021. On March 2, 2021, she presented her credentials to President Évariste Ndayishimiye.

== Awards ==
In 2010, she received the Sinclaire Language Award from the American Foreign Service Association.

== Personal life ==
Higgins speaks French, Indonesian, and some Bosnian.

Diplomatic posts
Preceded by Anne Casper; Eunice Reddick (Chargé d’Affaires)	United States Ambassador to Burundi; 2021–2023	Succeeded by Keith R. Gilges (Chargé d’Affaires)
