= List of ambassadors of the United States to Cape Verde =

Ambassador of the United States to Cape Verde
- Seal of the United States Department of State

- Flag of a United States ambassador

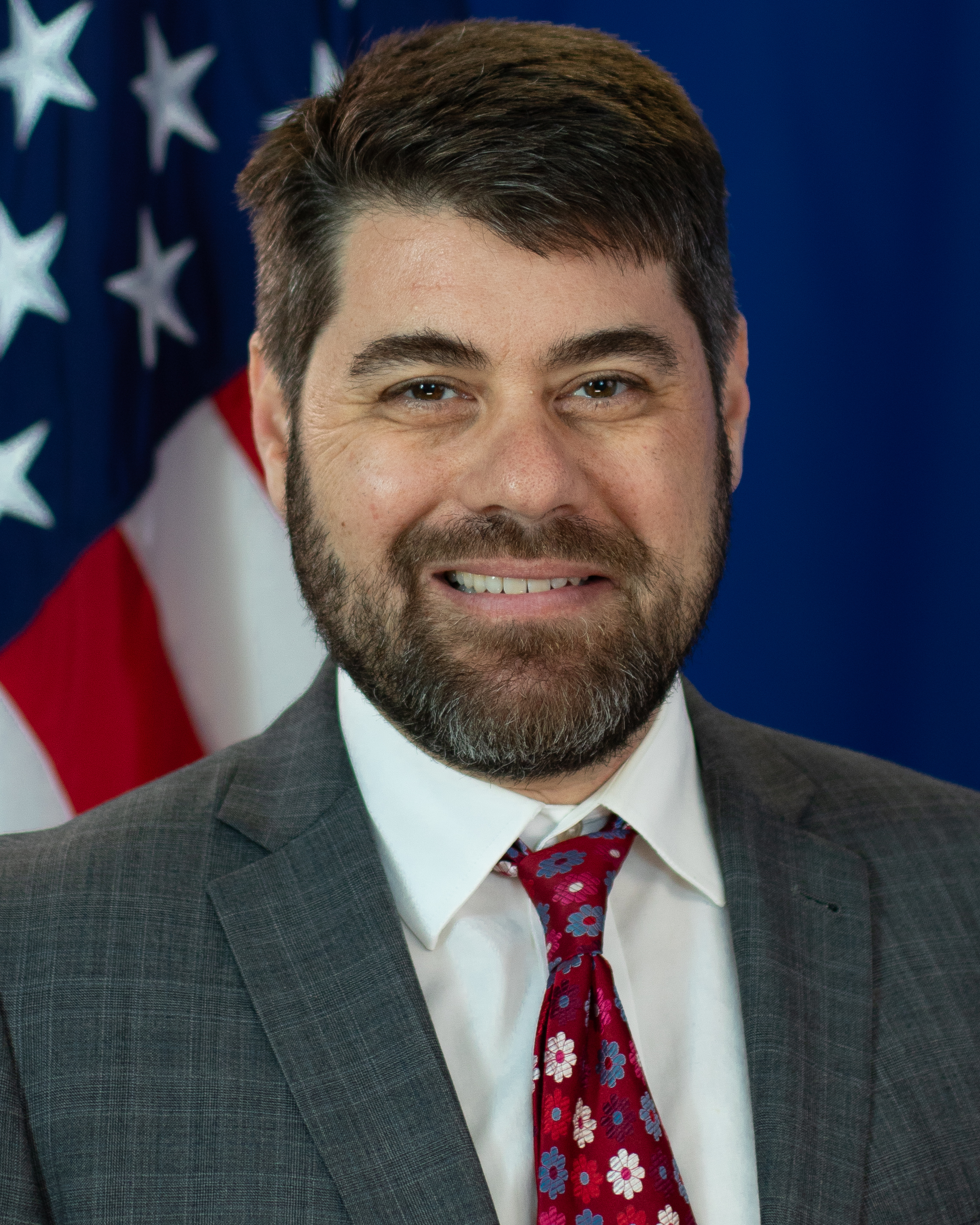
- Incumbent; Mark Weinberg; Chargé d'affaires since January 16, 2026
- Nominator: The president of the United States
- Appointer: The president; with Senate advice and consent
- Inaugural holder: Melissa F. Wells as Ambassador Extraordinary and Plenipotentiary
- Formation: September 16, 1976
- Website: U.S. Embassy - Praia

Cape Verde had been a Portuguese colony for more than 500 years since 1456. In 1974 Portugal and the Cape Verdeans signed an agreement to form a transitional government, and Cape Verde gained full independence from Portugal on July 5, 1975.

The United States recognized Cape Verde and commissioned its first ambassador Melissa F. Wells in 1976. Ambassador Wells was concurrently accredited to Guinea-Bissau and Cape Verde while resident at Bissau, the capital of Guinea-Bissau. In 1980, an embassy was established in the capital Praia with a chargé d’affaires managing the business of the embassy. Until 1980 one ambassador, resident at Bissau, was concurrently commissioned to Guinea-Bissau and Cape Verde.

== Ambassadors ==
| Name | Title | Appointed | Presented credentials | Terminated mission | Notes |
|---|---|---|---|---|---|
| Melissa F. Wells – Career FSO | Ambassador Extraordinary and Plenipotentiary | September 16, 1976 | November 18, 1976 | March 23, 1977 | |
| Edward Marks – Career FSO | Ambassador Extraordinary and Plenipotentiary | September 15, 1977 | October 18, 1977 | July 11, 1980 | Embassy Praia was established January 28, 1978 with Howard McGowan as Chargé d’Affaires ad interim. The ambassador remained in Bissau. |
| Peter Jon de Vos – Career FSO | Ambassador Extraordinary and Plenipotentiary | September 5, 1980 | September 24, 1980 | Left Bissau, March 30, 1983 | In 1983 the first ambassador was appointed solely accredited to Cape Verde. |
| John Melvin Yates – Career FSO | Ambassador Extraordinary and Plenipotentiary | March 18, 1983 | April 26, 1983 | May 24, 1986 | |
| Vernon Dubois Penner, Jr. – Career FSO | Ambassador Extraordinary and Plenipotentiary | June 16, 1986 | July 15, 1986 | November 21, 1989 | |
| Francis Terry McNamara – Career FSO | Ambassador Extraordinary and Plenipotentiary | November 21, 1989 | December 23, 1989 | December 31, 1992 | |
| Joseph Monroe Segars – Career FSO | Ambassador Extraordinary and Plenipotentiary | July 14, 1992 | March 24, 1993 | March 17, 1996 | |
| Lawrence Neal Benedict – Career FSO | Ambassador Extraordinary and Plenipotentiary | June 6, 1996 | July 30, 1996 | August 11, 1999 | |
| Michael D. Metelits – Career FSO | Ambassador Extraordinary and Plenipotentiary | July 7, 1999 | September 15, 1999 | July 24, 2002 | |
| Donald C. Johnson – Career FSO | Ambassador Extraordinary and Plenipotentiary | October 3, 2002 | November 21, 2002 | April 4, 2005 | |
| Roger D. Pierce – Career FSO | Ambassador Extraordinary and Plenipotentiary | June 21, 2005 | September 27, 2005 | June 9, 2008 | |
| Marianne M. Myles – Career FSO | Ambassador Extraordinary and Plenipotentiary | June 6, 2008 | August 6, 2008 | August 1, 2011 | |
| Dana Brown - Career FSO | Chargé d'Affaires ad interim | August 1, 2011 | Unknown | December 9, 2011 | |
| Adrienne S. O'Neal - Career FSO | Ambassador Extraordinary and Plenipotentiary | October 19, 2011 | December 9, 2011 | January 31, 2015 | |
| Donald Heflin - Career FSO | Ambassador Extraordinary and Plenipotentiary | December 18, 2014 | January 31, 2015 | September 11, 2018 | |
| Jeff Daigle - Career FSO | Ambassador Extraordinary and Plenipotentiary | May 29, 2019 | September 10, 2019 | July 3, 2024 | |
| Jennifer M. Adams - Career FSO | Ambassador Extraordinary and Plenipotentiary | May 2, 2024 | September 10, 2024 | January 16, 2026 | |
| Mark Weinberg - Career FSO | Chargé d'Affaires ad interim | January 16, 2026 | Unknown | Present | |

== See also ==
- Embassy of Cape Verde in Washington, D.C.
- Cape Verde – United States relations
- Foreign relations of Cape Verde
- Ambassadors from the United States

== Sources ==
- U.S. Department of State: Background Notes on Cape Verde
