= Michael S. Klecheski =

American diplomat

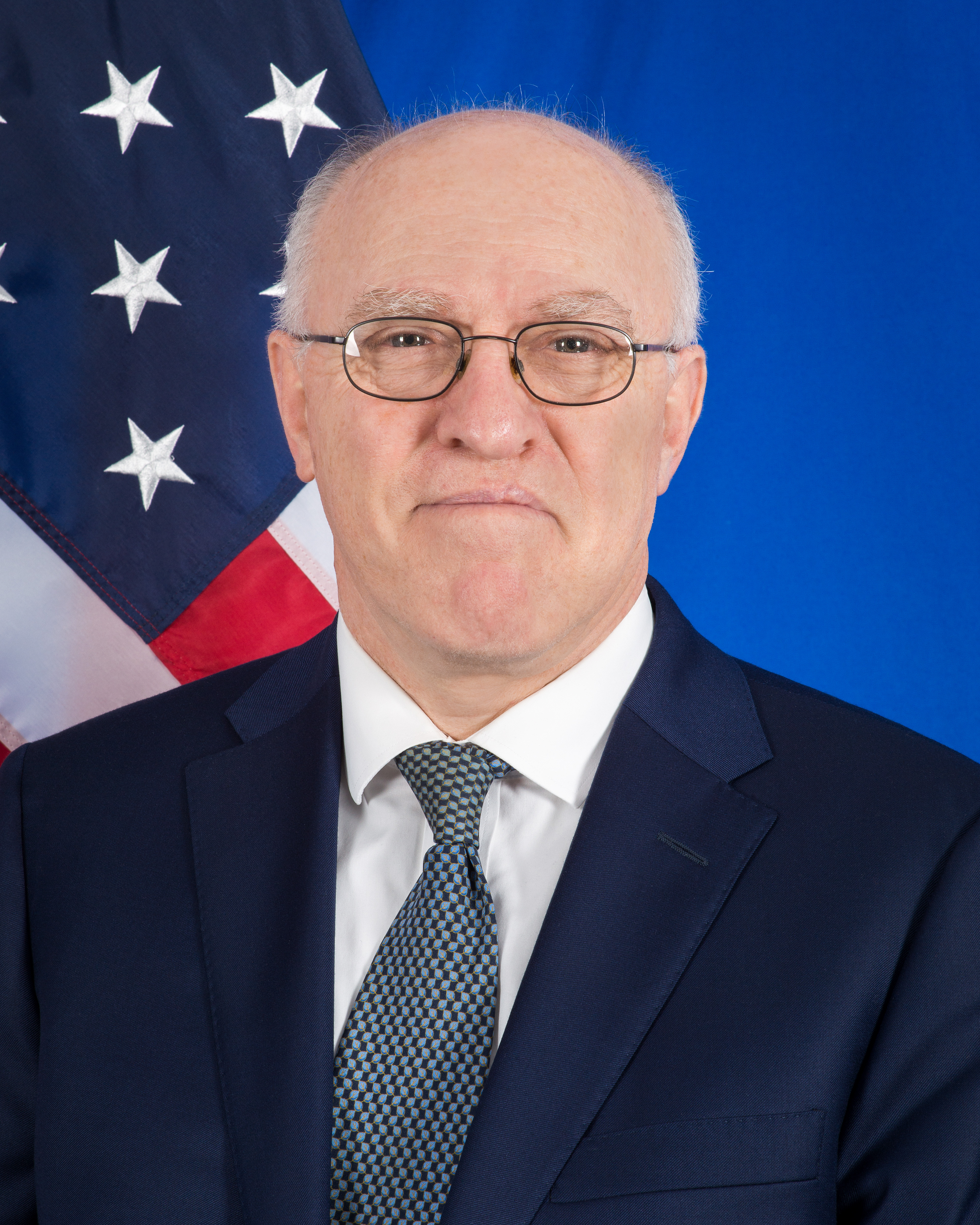

United States Ambassador to Mongolia
- In office February 22, 2019 – September 24, 2022
- President: Donald Trump; Joe Biden
- Preceded by: Jennifer Zimdahl Galt
- Succeeded by: Richard Buangan

Personal details
- Education: Georgetown University (B.S.F.S.); Columbia University (M.A., MPhil)

Michael Stanley Klecheski is an American diplomat who formerly served as the United States Ambassador to Mongolia from 2019 to 2022.

== Education ==
Klecheski earned a Bachelor of Science in Foreign Service from Georgetown University and a Master of Arts and Master of Philosophy from Columbia University.

== Career ==
Klecheski's career started when he became a member of the Nuclear Risk Reduction Center from 1989 to 1990. He then became a NATO Desk Officer from 1990 to 1992. He was Political/Economic Officer at the U.S. Consulate in Krakow, Poland from 1992 to 1995, later moving to the U.S. Embassy in Manila Philippines where he was a Political Officer. Then he became a Senior Watch Officer in the Operations Center from 1999 to 2000. He went back to working for the U.S. Consulate this time working in St. Petersburg, Russia from 2000 to 2003. He continued working in foreign affairs relating to Russia becoming the Political Internal Unit Chief at the U.S. Embassy in Russia from 2003 to 2006. He became Director of the National Security Council at the White House from 2006 to 2007. He became Political Counselor for the U.S. Mission in Geneva, Switzerland from 2007 to 2009. From 2009 to 2010 he became Team Leader of the Provincial Reconstruction Team in Diwaniyah in Iraq.

Klecheski served as Deputy Chief of Mission at the United States Embassy in Astana, Kazakhstan from 2013 to 2015 and in other overseas assignments in Russia, Iraq, Switzerland, and Poland.

On August 13, 2018, President Donald Trump announced his intent to nominate Klecheski to be the next United States Ambassador to Mongolia. He was confirmed by the United States on January 2, 2019. He presented his credentials on February 22, 2019. He left this post on September 24, 2022.

== Personal life ==
Klecheski is from Queens, New York. He speaks Russian, Polish, French and Tagalog. He is married to Eloisa de Leon Klecheski. They have three children.

Diplomatic posts
Preceded by Jennifer Zimdahl Galt	United States Ambassador to Mongolia; 2019–2022	Succeeded by Richard Buangan
