= Marianne M. Myles =

American diplomat

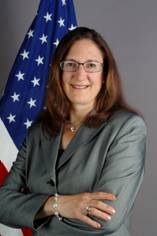
Marianne M Myles

Marianne Matuzic Myles (born 1953, Lackawanna, New York) is an American diplomat, formerly serving as the ambassador to Cape Verde (2008-2011).

== Education ==
Myles earned a bachelor's degree in economics from the State University of New York at Oswego (1975), a Masters in Public Administration from Harvard University and a Masters of Science in National Security Strategy from the National Defense University.

== Career ==
She served as dean of the State Department's School of Language Studies in Washington, D.C.

== Personal life ==
Myles is married to retired Foreign Service Officer Stan Myles.

Diplomatic posts
Preceded by Roger D. Pierce	United States Ambassador to Cape Verde; 2008–2011	Succeeded by Adrienne S. O'Neal
