= Mark C. Minton =

U.S Ambassador

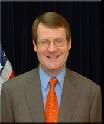

7th U.S. Ambassador to Mongolia
- In office September 20, 2006 – September 21, 2009
- President: George W. Bush
- Preceded by: Pamela J. H. Slutz
- Succeeded by: Jonathan S. Addleton

Personal details
- Education: Columbia University (BA); Yale University (MA)

Mark C. Minton (born 1944) is career member (retired) of the United States Foreign Service and served as the U.S. ambassador to Mongolia from 2006 to 2009. He was formerly president of the Korea Society from 2010 to 2015 and then joined the faculty of the School of Global and International Studies at Indiana University Bloomington.

== Career ==
Minton began his 32-year Foreign Service career as a Political Officer at the U.S. Embassy in Tokyo in 1977. He served on the Policy Planning Staff in Washington, D.C., followed by an assignment with the Office of Soviet Union Affairs. In 1984, he became the Consul General in Sapporo, Japan. He has served in subsequent assignments with the Department of State's Executive Secretariat, as a Pearson Fellow with the United States Senate, and as deputy director, Japanese affairs, at the Department of State.

In 1992, Minton became the minister-counselor for political affairs at the U.S. Embassy in Seoul, after which he returned to Washington as the director of Korean affairs. In 1998, he was appointed minister-counselor for political affairs at the U.S. Mission to the United Nations, followed by a year as diplomat-in-residence at the City College of New York.

Before becoming ambassador to Mongolia, Minton was deputy chief of mission at the U.S. Embassy in Seoul, Republic of Korea. During his assignment in Seoul, he acted for over six months as chargé d'affaires ad interim. In May 2010, Minton succeeded Evans J.R. Revere to become president of the Korea Society.

In 2015, Minton joined the school of global and international studies at Indiana University Bloomington where he lectured on East Asian studies and diplomacy.

Minton graduated from Columbia University with a B.A. in literature in 1967 and received his master's degree in history from Yale University. He speaks Japanese and Korean. He also is a veteran of the United States Army, having served for three years.

Diplomatic posts
Preceded by Pamela J. H. Slutz	U.S. Ambassador to Mongolia; 2006–2009	Succeeded by Jonathan Addleton
