= Jonathan Addleton =

American diplomat and author

Jonathan S. Addleton
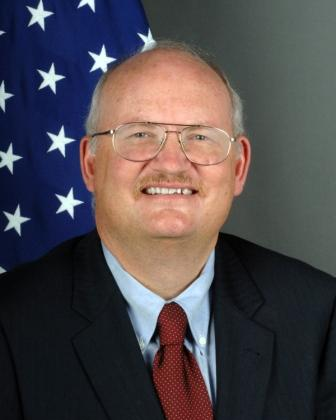

8th United States Ambassador to Mongolia
- In office November 25, 2009 – July 15, 2012
- President: Barack Obama
- Preceded by: Mark C. Minton
- Succeeded by: Piper Campbell

Personal details
- Born: 1957 (age 68–69)

Jonathan S. Addleton (born 1957) is an American diplomat and author. He served as the 8th U.S. Ambassador to Mongolia from 2009 to 2012. He is Current Rector of Forman Christian College (FCCU).

Addleton was born in Pakistan, the son of Baptist missionaries from rural Georgia. He spent his early years with his parents in Upper Sind then attended the Murree Christian School, located at a former British Indian Himalayan hill station near the tiny crossroads town of Jhika Gali in the Murree hills of Rawalpindi District, Punjab province.

He went on to attend college at Northwestern University, where he received his bachelor's in journalism. He later earned his MA and PhD from the Fletcher School of Law and Diplomacy at Tufts University. As an undergraduate he was an intern and then a reporter at The Macon Telegraph. He worked briefly at the World Bank and the Carnegie Endowment for International Peace, before joining the Foreign Service in 1984. His first assignments were as USAID Program Officer in Jordan, Kazakhstan, South Africa, and Yemen. Addleton retired from the Foreign Service on January 20, 2017.

From 2001 to 2004 Addleton was USAID mission director in Mongolia. He then headed USAID missions in Cambodia (2004–2006), Pakistan (2006–2007), Central Asia (Kazakhstan) (2013–2015) and India (2015–2017). He also was seconded to the Department of State to serve as Senior Civilian Representative (SCR) to southern Afghanistan based in Kandahar (2012–2013). Addleton was Counselor for International Development at the US Mission to the European Union in Brussels, Belgium (2007–2009), when President Barack Obama nominated him to be ambassador to Mongolia.

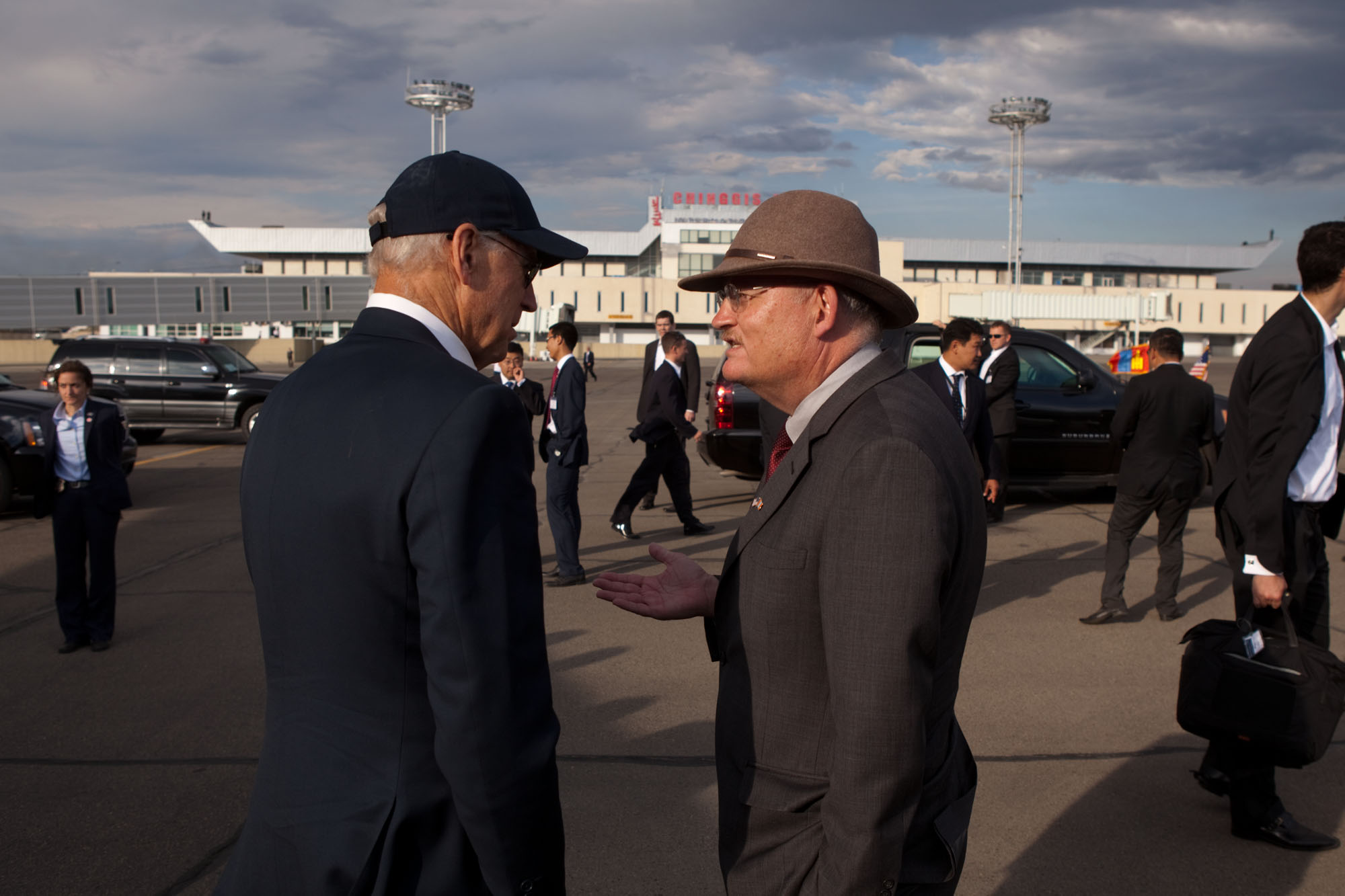
Vice President Joseph Biden talks with US Ambassador Jonathan Addleton at Ulaanbaatar's Chinggis Khan Airport, Aug. 2011

On April 6, 2013 Addleton was part of a group targeted by a suicide bomber as they walked to a local school to deliver textbooks in the Afghan city of Qalat. A suicide bomber's car exploded just outside the walls of the Provincial Reconstruction Team Zabul killing Foreign Service Officer Anne Smedinghoff, three U.S. service members and an Afghan interpreter. An Army report of the incident later noted that [Addleton] "may have been the main target, although insurgents were perhaps targeting anyone partaking in the mission." Addleton later wrote "Not a day goes by when I don't relive what happened on that cloudless morning, recalling every moment as it unfolded, reliving endlessly what might have been. I wish a dust storm had blown up out of nowhere, causing all flights to be canceled. I wish the outcome had been different. I wish I had been killed instead. But I somehow did survive, alone among the living."

Following his retirement from the Foreign Service in January 2017, Addleton has worked as an Adjunct in the Department of International and Global Studies at Mercer University in his hometown of Macon, GA. He also took on a new assignment as the part-time, US-based Executive Director of the American Center for Mongolian Studies.

His publishing credits include a memoir of his childhood in Pakistan, Some Far and Distant Place (University of Georgia Press, 1997), Undermining the Centre: The Gulf Migration and Pakistan (Oxford University Press, 1992), Mongolia and the United States: A Diplomatic History (Hong Kong University Press, 2013) and "The Dust of Kandahar: A Diplomat Among Warriors in Afghanistan" (Naval Institute Press, 2016). He has also contributed articles to Asian Survey, Asian Affairs, International Migration, Muslim World, Mongolica, Foreign Service Journal' and The Washington Post, among other publications.

Addleton's awards include the Christian A. Herter Award for intellectual courage and constructive dissent from the American Foreign Service Association; ISAF Service Medal from NATO; Outstanding Civilian Service Medal from the US Department of Army; Administrator's Distinguished Career Service Award, Distinguished Honor Award, Superior Honor Award and Presidential Meritorious Service Award from USAID; and the Polar Star, Mongolia's highest civilian award, from the President of Mongolia. Early in his career, he was invited to serve as a Breadloaf Fellow at Middlebury College's annual Summer Writer's Conference near Middlebury, Vermont. In May 2017, Addleton was one of six alumni inducted into Northwestern University's Medill School of Journalism "Hall of Achievement," a group that included Pulitzer Prize winning biographer Kai Bird, Pulitzer Prize winning editor Bruce Dold and Edith Chapin, Executive Editor of NPR News.

He speaks Urdu and Hindi and has studied French, Russian, Arabic and Mongolian. He is currently the Rector of Forman Christian College which is a University in the city of Lahore, Pakistan having been appointed to that position in November 2020.

Diplomatic posts
| Preceded by Mark C. Minton | U.S. Ambassador to Mongolia; 2009–2011 | Succeeded by Piper Anne Wind Campbell |
