= Adrienne S. O'Neal =

American diplomat

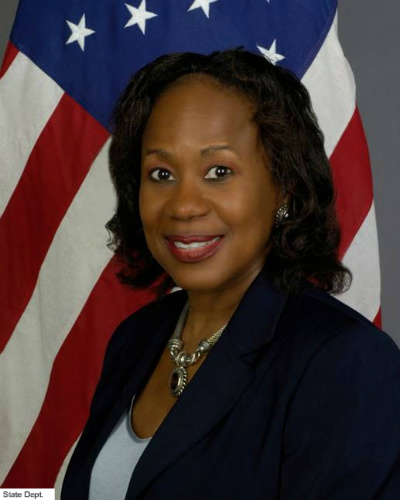

United States Ambassador to Cape Verde
- In office December 9, 2011 – January 31, 2015
- President: Barack Obama
- Preceded by: Marianne M. Myles
- Succeeded by: Donald Helfin

Personal details
- Born: 1954 (age 71–72) Durham, North Carolina

Adrienne S. O'Neal (born 1954) is the former United States Ambassador to Cape Verde. On June 24, 2011, O'Neal was nominated by President Barack Obama to serve as Ambassador and was then confirmed by the United States Senate on October 18, 2011. O'Neal presented her credentials to Cape Verde's president, Jorge Carlos Fonseca, on December 9, 2011.

== Early life and education ==
O'Neal was born in Durham, North Carolina, and raised in New Orleans. She is a resident of Michigan, and formerly served as Diplomat in Residence at the University of Michigan from 2007 to 2009. O'Neal received a B.A. in business administration and Spanish from Spelman College. She also earned an M.M.L. in Spanish language and literature from Middlebury College in Vermont.

== Career ==
Since joining the U.S. Foreign Service in 1983, O'Neal has since become a career member with the rank of Minister Counselor. She has previously served in Italy, Argentina, Mozambique, Brazil, Portugal and Washington, DC. She became Ambassador to Cape Verde in December, 2011, after appointment by President Barack Obama, replacing Marianne M. Myles. She left her post sometime in 2014.

== See also ==
- United States-Cape Verde relations
