= Piper Campbell =

American diplomat (born 1965)

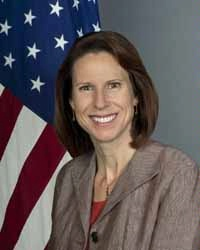
- Official portrait, 2013

United States Ambassador to Mongolia
- In office August 24, 2012 – August 11, 2015
- President: Barack Obama
- Preceded by: Jonathan Addleton
- Succeeded by: Jennifer Galt

Personal details
- Born: 1965 (age 60–61)
- Education: Georgetown University; Harvard Kennedy School

Piper Anne Wind Campbell (born 1965) is a professor of practice and former American diplomat. She was the 9th U.S. Ambassador to Mongolia. From June to December 2018, Campbell was the Chargé d'affaires ad interim at the United States Mission to the Association of Southeast Asian Nations. She is the inaugural Chair of the Department of Foreign Policy and Global Security at American University's School of International Service, directing its US Foreign Policy and National Security (USFP) as well as International Affairs Policy and Analysis (IAPA) graduate programs.

Campbell was born in Buffalo, New York, in 1965, the daughter of Gay and David N. Campbell. She attended Nichols School in Buffalo and was inspired to pursue a career in the Foreign Service after a study abroad program in Japan. She obtained a bachelor's degree from Georgetown University School of Foreign Service in 1988 and joined the Foreign Service in 1989.

Campbell's early assignments included Manila, Brussels, the State Department's Operations Center in Washington, DC, and the Department's Bureau of International Organization Affairs. In 1996 she joined the civil affairs section of a United Nations peacekeeping mission in eastern Croatia and helped open an office of the U.S. Agency for International Development (USAID) in Eastern Slavonia, Croatia.

In 1999 Campbell took a year's leave to pursue a master's degree in public administration from the Harvard Kennedy School.

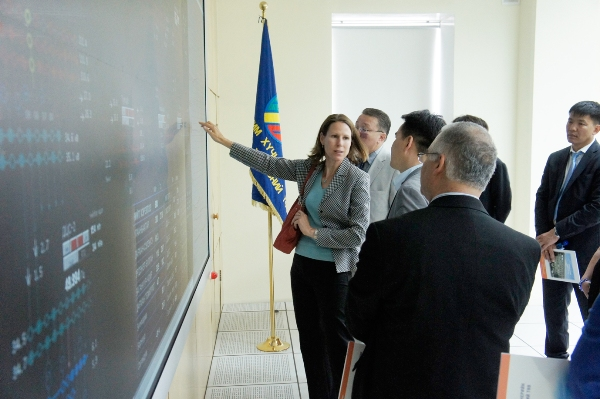
Ambassador Piper Campbell reviews progress on the MCA project in Mongolia, June 2013

Campbell went on to work at the U.S. Missions to the United Nations in New York (1999–2002) and Geneva (2002–2006). From 2006 to 2009 she was the Deputy Chief of Mission in Phnom Penh, Cambodia, where she spent almost five months as Chargé d'affaires ad interim from August 25, 2008, to January 19, 2009. She then became Chief of Staff to the first-ever Deputy Secretary of State for Management and Resources Jacob J. Lew (who later became Treasury Secretary), and his successor Thomas R. Nides. From June 2011 to June 2012, Campbell served as the senior civilian representative of the U.S. government in southern Iraq, opening Consulate General Basrah on July 5, 2011.

President Barack Obama nominated Campbell as U.S. Ambassador to Mongolia on March 5, 2012 and the U.S. Senate confirmed her on June 29, 2012. She was sworn in on August 6, 2012, and presented her credentials to President Tsakhiagiin Elbegdorj on August 24, 2012.

Campbell characterized her tenure in Mongolia as "steering the U.S. government interaction with Mongolia, driving that relationship through a change, a transition." She has stated that there were three main areas upon which she wanted to strengthen ties between the U.S. and Mongolia; broadening commercial development, military and development cooperation, and cultural cooperation.

Campbell's tour in Mongolia ended in 2015. She then served as an assistant professor for National Security Studies at the National War College until 2017. After that she was put in charge of the recruitment and examination of new Foreign Service Officers plus some other internal State Department programs until mid-2018, when she was posted to USASEAN. She left the State Department in 2019, and joined American University's School of International Service in 2020. She became a full-time faculty member and administrative director of SIS's graduate programs on U.S. Foreign Policy and National Security (USFP) and Global Governance, Politics and Security (GGPS) in July 2022.

Diplomatic posts
Preceded by Jonathan Addleton	United States Ambassador to Mongolia; 2012–2015	Succeeded by Jennifer Galt
