= Alphonse F. La Porta =

American diplomat

Alphonse F. LaPorta

United States Ambassador to Mongolia
- In office December 1997 – November 2000
- President: Bill Clinton
- Preceded by: Donald C. Johnson
- Succeeded by: John R. Dinger

Personal details
- Born: January 15, 1939 (age 87)
- Profession: Diplomat, Career Ambassador

Alphonse F. La Porta (born January 15, 1939) a Career Member of the Senior Foreign Service, served as U.S. Ambassador to Mongolia from December 1997 to November 2000. Subsequently, he served as the Political Advisor to the U.S. Commander-in-Chief of the Regional Headquarters Allied Forces in southern Europe from January 2001 to November 2003.

== Career ==
Alphonse La Porta was born on January 15, 1939, in Brooklyn, New York. His family moved to the South Shore of Long Island – first to Oceanside, then Lynbrook. when he was young. His parents, both first generation immigrants, worked as hair dressers. His father came from Sicily and his mother from Ukraine. As a child he attended Davison Avenue Elementary School, then Malverne Junior High School, finally graduating from Malverne High School in 1956. He enrolled in the Georgetown University School of Foreign Service, graduating in 1960. That same he took the Foreign Service Exam, passing the written portion but failing to score a passing grade on the oral exams. He then decided to pursue a master's degree at New York University from 1960 to 1962 after which he entered the U.S. Army where he worked in Army Intelligence. He finished his enlistment in 1963 and began to pursue his Ph.D. at Georgetown University when he was recruited to work at the National Security Agency. He retook the Foreign Service exam in 1963–64 and this time passed both exams.

He entered the Foreign Service in 1965. His first assignment was to the Office of Planning and Management. From 1967 to 1970 he was Political Officer and Chief of the Consular Section in the U.S. Embassy in Jakarta, Indonesia. In this position he attested to the passport application of Stanley Ann Dunham Soetoro, mother of President Barack H. Obama. He thus has become a part of some Barack Obama citizenship conspiracy theories.

He was Principal Officer of the U.S. Consulate in Medan (1978–1981). From 1985 to 1987 La Porta served in the State Department's Office of Management Operations, then moved on to be Deputy Chief of Mission in U.S. Embassy Wellington, New Zealand from 1987 to 1991.

Amb. La Porta's Washington-based assignments included working in the Bureau of East Asian and Pacific Affairs as director of the Office of Cambodian Genocide Investigation, executive assistant to the president's special representative for the Philippine economic reform, and as deputy director of the Office of Indonesia, Malaysia, Brunei and Singapore Affairs.

Before becoming U.S. Ambassador to Mongolia in 1997 he served as president and vice president of the American Foreign Service Association from 1995 to 1997.

Ambassador La Porta retired from the U.S. Foreign Service in September 2003 after more than 38 years of service. He was president of the United States-Indonesia Society (USINDO) from 2004 through 2007 and currently is a Managing Partner of Trans Pacific Partners, LLC (TPP) where he provides professional support for military exercises in the Pacific, Europe and Latin America, and serves as a consultant on civil preparedness and disaster management.

He also served on the board of directors of the Friends of Mongolia, a 501(c)3 non-profit composed of over three decades of Returned Peace Corps Volunteers who served in Mongolia.

== Education and military service ==
Amb. La Porta is a graduate of the National War College, Georgetown University's School of Foreign Service (1960) and New York University. He served as a commissioned officer in the United States Army from 1961 to 1963. He speaks both Indonesian and Turkish.

Diplomatic posts
Preceded by Donald C. Johnson	U.S. Ambassador to Mongolia; 1997–2000	Succeeded by John R. Dinger
