= Dawn M. Liberi =

American diplomat (born 1954)

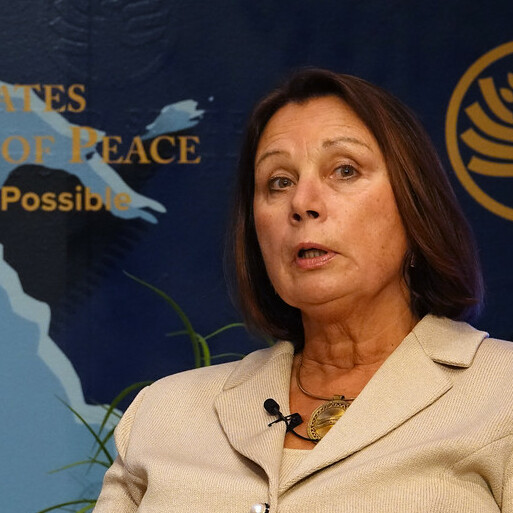
- in 2023 at US Institute for Peace

United States Ambassador to Burundi
- In office October 19, 2012 – July 24, 2016
- President: Barack Obama
- Preceded by: Pamela J. H. Slutz
- Succeeded by: Anne Casper

Personal details
- Born: 1954 (age 71–72)
- Education: Hampshire College (BA); University of California, Berkeley (MPH); Dwight D. Eisenhower School for National Security and Resource Strategy

Dawn M. Liberi (born 1954) is a diplomat, international development expert and former United States Ambassador to Burundi. She was nominated by President Barack Obama on July 10, 2012, and confirmed by the Senate October 19, 2012.

== Early life and education ==
Liberi was born in 1954. She earned a bachelor's degree from Hampshire College in Amherst, Massachusetts. During her undergraduate studies she held internships at UNICEF in New York City and travelled to learn about the health care systems of Egypt and The Netherlands. She pursued graduate studies in California, earning a master's degree in Public Health from the University of California, Berkeley. She later focused on national security issues in graduate studies at the Dwight D. Eisenhower School for National Security and Resource Strategy at the National Defense University.

== Career ==
Liberi was particularly interested in international public health issues, and when she joined the U.S. the Foreign Service, she began as a health officer. Her initial assignments were in sub-Saharan Africa, including Senegal, Uganda and Nigeria. She served with the United States Agency for International Development over the course of twenty years. From 2002 to 2005 she served as USAID Mission Director in Nigeria. In that role she managed multimillion-dollar aid programs and brokered an alliance to fund community development.

Liberi was the USAID Mission Director in Iraq from 2005 to 2006, responsible for a multibillion-dollar program of economic development. Following that assignment she became an Executive Civil-Military Counselor, serving as the Senior Development Advisor to the Commander of the U.S. Central Command. For the next two years, Liberi was assigned to the U.S. Embassy in Afghanistan, where she served as the Coordinator for the Interagency Provincial Affairs Office. When President Obama nominated her to become an ambassador, she was serving as the Senior Assistance Coordinator at U.S. Embassy in Libya.

She presented her credentials in Burundi on January 18, 2013. During her assignment as ambassador there, the country has experienced increased tensions. After her arrival, Liberi was very supportive of an Atrocity Prevention Board's seven person team that went to Burundi to assess the potential for violence. In spring 2015, there were protests over President Pierre Nkurunziza's bid for third term in office. Protesting students noted that Liberi visited them and said she had raised their plight with the local government. However, she did not promise them asylum, as they hoped., and they were required to leave the embassy site after police left. When the legitimacy of elections in June were questioned, the ambassador shared with Reuters that the U.S. would review its relationship and aid to Burundi.

Liberi stepped down from her post on July 24, 2016, and was succeeded by Anne Casper.

== See also ==
- Ambassadors of the United States

Diplomatic posts
Preceded by Pamela J. H. Slutz	United States Ambassador to Burundi; 2012–2016	Succeeded by Anne Casper
