= Donald Heflin =

American diplomat

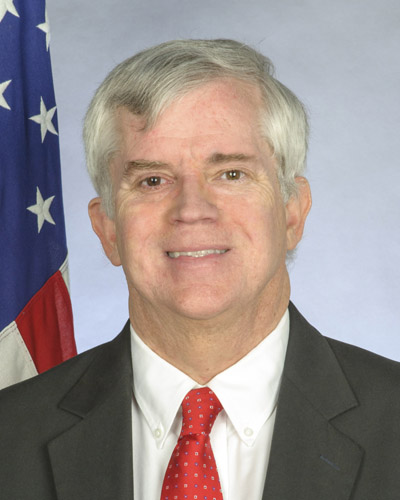

U.S. Chargé d'affaires to India
- In office January 20, 2021 – April 30, 2021
- President: Joe Biden
- Preceded by: Kenneth Juster
- Succeeded by: Daniel Bennett Smith

United States Ambassador to Cape Verde
- In office January 31, 2015 – September 11, 2018
- President: Barack Obama; Donald Trump
- Preceded by: Adrienne S. O'Neal
- Succeeded by: Jeff Daigle

Personal details
- Born: 1958 (age 67–68) Leesburg, Virginia
- Spouse: Lauren Teeling Adams
- Children: Sara Heflin
- Education: S. R. Butler High School; Birmingham-Southern College; University of Alabama

Donald L. Heflin (born 1958) is an American diplomat who served as the United States Ambassador to Cape Verde from 2015 to 2018.

== Early life and education ==
Heflin was born in Leesburg, Virginia and grew up in Huntsville, attending S. R. Butler High School. He attended Birmingham-Southern College, graduating with a degree in political science and religion in 1980, before going on to law school at the University of Alabama, graduating from there in 1983.

== Career ==
Heflin joined the Foreign Service in 1987 and was first posted to Lima, Peru and then, in 1990, to Madras, India. In 1992, Heflin was moved to be deputy principal officer in Hermosillo, Mexico and the next year, in his first African posting, he was assigned to the embassy in Lusaka, Zambia as consul.

Heflin was recalled to Washington in 1995 as desk officer for Rwanda and Burundi and two years later to be the coordination division officer in the Bureau of Consular Affairs.

In 1999, Heflin was again posted overseas as a consul in the embassy in London, United Kingdom, staying there until 2004, when he returned to the U.S. to work as deputy director for the Office of West African Affairs. While in that post, Heflin worked as acting Director for a time.

Heflin returned to Mexico in 2009 to work as principal officer and Consul General in Nuevo Laredo. Heflin left Mexico for another stint in Washington in 2012, when he started as the managing director of the Consular Affairs Visa Office. He remained in this post until he was nominated for the ambassadorship for Cape Verde in June 2014.

Helfin testified before the Senate Foreign Relations Committee in July 2014 and was confirmed by Senate voice vote as the United States Ambassador to Cape Verde on the 12 December 2014. He began his duties in Praia on 29 January the next year. Heflin presented his credentials to Jorge Carlos Fonseca, the President of Cape Verde on 5 February 2015.

Heflin left the post in early September 2018 and was succeeded by Marissa Scott as Chargée d'affaires and in 2019 by Jeff Daigle, the new U.S. Ambassador. Heflin later served as Minister-Counselor for Consular and Consulate Affairs in Mexico, overseeing the nine American Consulates in the country, as well as Chargé d'affaires at the U.S. Embassy in New Delhi, India.

== Personal life ==
Heflin has a daughter, Sara, and can speak Spanish and Portuguese.

Heflin is a supporter of the Crimson Tide, the football team of his law school alma mater, University of Alabama.

Diplomatic posts
Preceded by Adrienne S. O'Neal	United States Ambassador to Cape Verde; 2015 – 2018	Succeeded by Jeff Daigle
