= Friends of Mongolia =

Friends of Mongolia (FOM) is a US-registered, 501(c)(3) tax-exempt non-profit organization registered in Mongolia and the United States. Friends of Mongolia is organized and operated exclusively for charitable, educational, and developmental purposes. Friends of Mongolia exists to develop partnerships with the people of Mongolia in furtherance of cultural exchange and human development. It is affiliated with the National Peace Corps Association, but membership is open to anyone with an interest in Mongolia.

== History ==
Friends of Mongolia was established in 1999 by returned Peace Corps volunteers who had served in Mongolia.

== Governance ==
Friends of Mongolia's operations are overseen by a board of directors who are elected for three-year terms and managed by officers (two Co-coordinators, Treasurer, Communications Coordinator, and Membership Coordinator) who are elected annually. A Mongolia Country Representative and Deputy Country Representative are appointed by the board to oversee activities in Mongolia.

Its board has included such figures as Alphonse F. La Porta, U.S. Ambassador to Mongolia from December 1997 to November 2000.

== Programs ==
=== FOM Scholarship Program ===
The FOM Scholarship was established in 2006, with the aim of assisting young male students from rural communities with high academic potential and financial need to attend post-secondary institutions across Mongolia. The program specifically stipulated that all applicants be male and living outside of Ulaanbaatar, Mongolia's capital city. The reason for this unique requirement was what is referred to as "Mongolia's reverse gender gap." Often rural males are left behind in education because of social and economic demands in the countryside. In fact, according to the National Statistics on Gender in Mongolia, in 2005 only 39% of students enrolled in institutions of higher education were male. Successful applicants were awarded one-year full-tuition scholarships.

=== Matthew Girvin Scholarship Fund ===
In 2006 FOM began working with Inland Northwest Community Foundation, UNICEF and the Mongolian Youth Development Foundation (MYDF) to help facilitate the distribution of the Matthew Girvin Scholarship Fund. This fund 'was created in memory of Matthew Girvin, a UNICEF program officer stationed in Mongolia who was killed in a helicopter crash in January 2001, to support highly qualified secondary school graduates from low-income families in the rural areas of Mongolia to study at some of the best state institutions of higher learning within Mongolia.

=== FOM Grant Program ===
The Friends of Mongolia Community Development Grant program is inspired by the Small Project Assistance (SPA) grant familiar to all PCVs, and provides financing for small community-based projects in Mongolia and the United States that further education, cultural exchange, and community development between both countries. Community projects generally do not attract the kind of funding on offer from large multi-lateral or bi-lateral donors, and modest community-based programs struggle to find appropriate funding to support their program goals. The FOM Community Development Grant program is intended to address these issues. FOM Community Development Grants can be as little as a few hundred dollars and do not generally exceed $2,500.

FOM Community Development Grants are community initiated and implemented. Each proposal should demonstrate community-based support for a project through a minimum 25% local in-kind contribution of labor and materials in the overall budget of the project.

Proposals are accepted on a rolling basis, and each proposal is reviewed by a committee made up of FOM Members using a standard scoring method. Final funding approval for proposals is made based on review committee recommendations and the availability of funds.

== Current Management ==
Friends of Mongolia (FOM)'s 2023 team continued to support education scholarships, promote cultural exchange, and prepare youth for meaningful employment. Its team included the following: William G. Federer, Director, Strategy and Public Engagement (USA) Undram Nyamaa, Finance Manager, Treasurer (USA) Oyungerel, Administration Officer, (Mongolia) Alice Chang, Communication Officer (USA) Davakhu Baasandorj, Communication Officer (Mongolia) Byambabat Munkhtogoo, Public Engagement Officer (Mongolia) Namuun Otgonbat, Public Engagement Officer (USA) Enkhjin Delgertsetseg, Public Engagement Officer (USA)

== Logo ==
The Friends of Mongolia logo depicts a Mongolian ger or yurt accompanied by traditional Mongolian script which spells 'Friend'.
