= Donald C. Johnson =

American diplomat

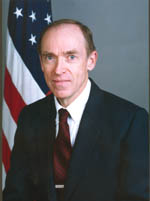

United States Ambassador to Equatorial Guinea
- In office October 16, 2006 – July 2008
- President: George W. Bush
- Preceded by: R. Niels Marquardt
- Succeeded by: Alberto M. Fernandez

United States Ambassador to Cape Verde
- In office October 3, 2002 – April 4, 2005
- President: George W. Bush
- Preceded by: Michael D. Metelits
- Succeeded by: Roger D. Pierce

United States Ambassador to Mongolia
- In office 1994–1996
- President: Bill Clinton
- Preceded by: Joseph Edward Lake
- Succeeded by: Alphonse F. La Porta

Personal details
- Born: 1949 (age 76–77) Mexico
- Profession: Diplomat, Career Ambassador

Donald C. Johnson (born 1949) is an American career diplomat who served as U.S. Ambassador to three countries; Equatorial Guinea, Cape Verde and Mongolia.

== Early life and education ==
Johnson grew up in Mexico. He received his Bachelor of Arts degree from Lewis & Clark College and his J.D. from Lewis & Clark Law School. He earned a Master of Public Administration from the University of Oklahoma in 1975. He received his LL.M in corporation law from the George Washington University Law School.

== Career ==
Johnson entered the United States Foreign Service in 1974. His first post was as Third Secretary in Guatemala. Other overseas postings have been in Moscow, Taipei, Beijing, Madrid, and Tegucigalpa. Domestic assignments include service as a Desk Officer at the State Department and service on the National Security Council at the White House.

Career highlights include earthquake relief in Guatemala, liaison with human rights groups in the former Soviet Union, negotiation of drug control and status of forces agreements in Honduras.

Before becoming U.S. Ambassador to Mongolia (1993–1996), Johnson had traveled to Ulaanbaatar before the U.S. had established diplomatic relations. He was also instrumental in concluding numerous trade and scientific agreements during his tenure.

From 1996 to 1997 he was Head of Mission in Moldova for the Organization for Security and Cooperation in Europe. Between 1997 and 1999 he was one of three members of the Independent International Commission on Decommissioning during the Northern Ireland peace process. While serving on the Commission, he led the team that carried out the very first voluntary decommissioning of paramilitary weapons in Northern Ireland, which saw the destruction of submachine guns, handguns, ammunition and improvised explosives.

From 2002 to 2005 he served as U.S. Ambassador to Cape Verde. During his service, Cape Verde was one of the first 16 countries to qualify for the Millennium Challenge Account, and prior to the completion of his Cape Verde assignment, Cape Verde signed a $110 million Compact with the Millennium Challenge Corporation to fund major infrastructure and water improvements. In addition, Cape Verde became only the sixth country in Africa to achieve Category 1 status for its civil aviation, and in July 2005, Cape Verde’s airline began direct flights to the U.S.

From the fall of 2005 until June 2006, Ambassador Johnson worked in the U.S. Mission to the Organization of American States, leading the U.S. team in the negotiations for a Social Charter of the Americas.

== Affiliations ==
He is a member of the District of Columbia Bar, the State Bar of Texas, and the U.S. Supreme Court Bar. He served in the U.S. Army as a draftee from 1971 to 1973.

Diplomatic posts
Preceded by R. Niels Marquardt	U.S. Ambassador to Equatorial Guinea; 2006–2008	Succeeded by Alberto M. Fernandez
Preceded by Michael D. Metelits	U.S. Ambassador to Cape Verde; 2002–2005	Succeeded by Roger D. Pierce
Preceded by Joseph Edward Lake	U.S. Ambassador to Mongolia; 1994–1996	Succeeded by Alphonse F. La Porta
