= Jeff Daigle =

American diplomat

John Daigle
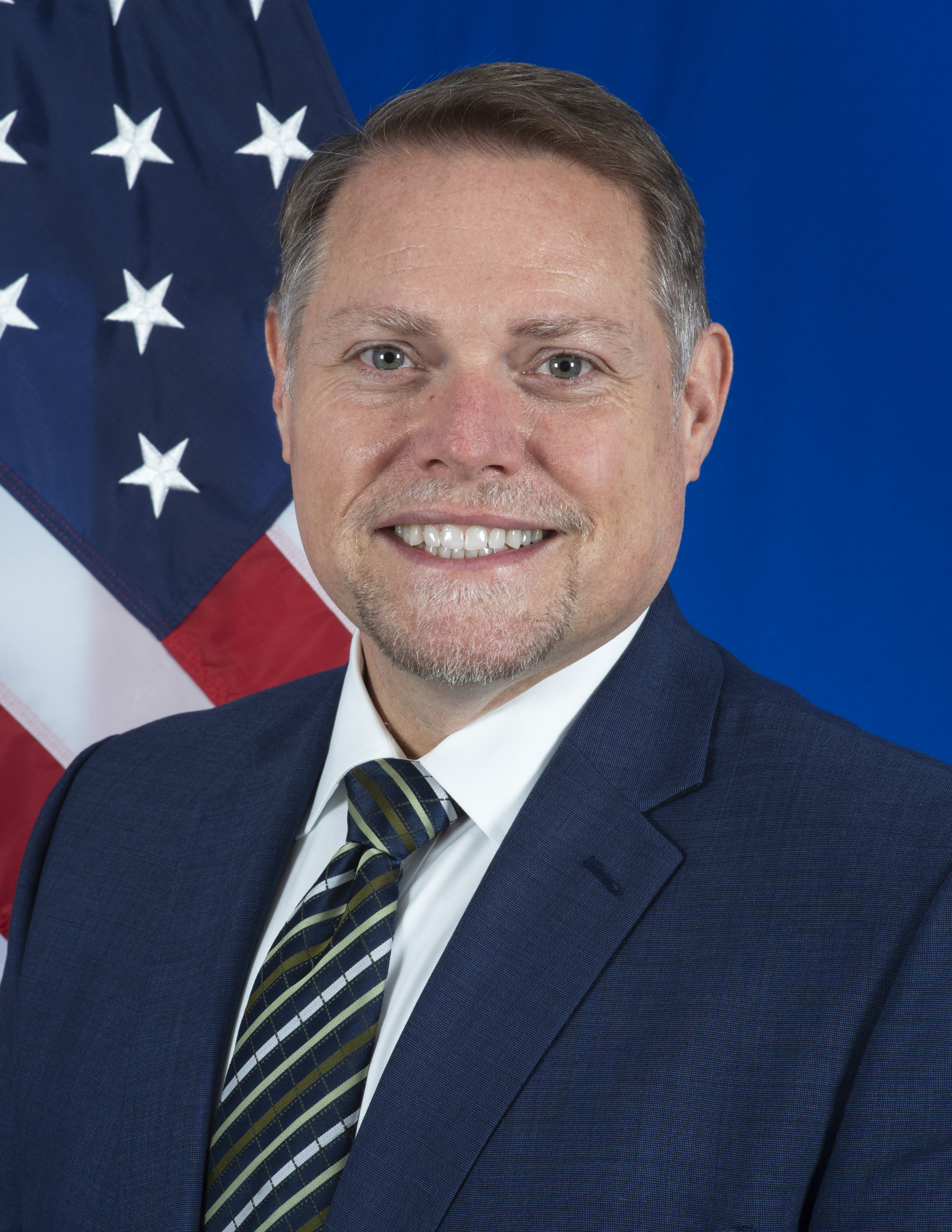

United States Ambassador to Cape Verde
- In office September 10, 2019 – July 3, 2024
- President: Donald Trump; Joe Biden
- Preceded by: Donald Heflin
- Succeeded by: Jennifer Adams

Personal details
- Born: John Jefferson Daigle Gonzales, Louisiana, U.S.
- Education: Louisiana State University (BA)

John Jefferson "Jeff" Daigle is an American diplomat who had served as the United States Ambassador to Cabo Verde, being sworn in on June 28, 2019. Immediately prior to his Ambassadorship, Daigle served as Acting Executive Director for the U.S. Advisory Commission on Public Diplomacy and Chief of Staff for the Under Secretary of State for Public Diplomacy and Public Affairs. Daigle is one of five LGBT appointed ambassadors under the Trump administration. Daigle left office on July 3, 2024.

== Life and career ==
A native of Gonzales, Louisiana, Daigle came from a large family. Born to Carole and Warren Daigle (he has described his father as a "World War II naval hero"), Daigle has 10 sisters and one brother.

Daigle graduated from Louisiana State University in 1987 (bachelor's degree in political science). Daigle had several jobs before entering the Foreign Service including working for an environmental non-governmental organization (Executive Director of the Louisiana Environmental Action Network), a construction company, an English teacher in Chiba Prefecture, Japan, a Regional Corporate Trainer for Hibernia National Bank in Baton Rouge and as an entertainer and facilitator of professional development programs at Disney World for seven years.

Daigle joined the Foreign Service in 1999. Major assignments including the Assistant Public Affairs Officer at Embassy Abuja, Nigeria (1999-2001), Reporting Officer at the United States Mission to the United Nations in New York City for the 56th U.N. General Assembly (2001), Consul at Embassy Paris, France (2002-2004), Public Affairs Officer at Embassy Phnom Penh, Cambodia (2005-2008). From 2011 to 2014, Daigle served as the Deputy chief of mission (DCM) at the United States Embassy Phnom Penh. In the spring of 2014, Daigle was assigned to be the top public affairs officer in the United States Embassy Beijing, China but backed out of the position shortly before he was to begin language training. The Department could not guarantee they would be able to assist his husband, Matt Cuenca-Daigle, stay with Daigle on the multi-year tour in Beijing. The couple was told Cuenca-Daigle "would have to leave China every three months at his own expense and re-enter on a short-term visa." They have been a couple for 18 years at the time of his confirmation hearings and Matt "has been with (him) through every posting but one."

== Personal life ==
Daigle speaks French, Khmer, and Portuguese.

== See also ==
- List of current ambassadors of the United States
- List of ambassadors appointed by Donald Trump

Diplomatic posts
Preceded by Donald Heflin	United States Ambassador to Cape Verde; 2019–2024	Succeeded by Jennifer Adams
