= United States – Indonesia Society =

U.S.-based nonprofit organization

USINDO
- The United States – Indonesia Society
- Abbreviation: USINDO
- Formation: 1994
- Founder: Edward E. Masters
- Headquarters: Washington DC, USA
- Location: Jakarta, Indonesia
- Board of Trustees Co-chair: Theo L. Sambuaga
- Board of Trustees Co-chair: Robert O. Blake, Jr.
- President: David N. Merrill
- Vice President: Christopher Wyrod
- Website: www.usindo.org

The United States – Indonesia Society (USINDO) is a non-partisan, non-governmental organization devoted to enhancing Americans’ understanding of Indonesia, deepening Indonesians’ knowledge of America, and strengthening relations between the two countries and their people. For more than three decades, USINDO has been building mutual understanding between the U.S. and Indonesia.

USINDO was founded in 1994 by Indonesian senior statesman and economist Sumitro Djojohadikusumo and Edward E. Masters, former U.S. Ambassador to Indonesia and USINDO's first president. It is a bi-national organization currently co-chaired by Robert O. Blake Jr. (former U.S. Ambassador to Indonesia) and Theo L. Sambuaga (former Indonesian minister). USINDO's president is David N. Merrill (former U.S. Ambassador to Bangladesh and former USAID Mission Director for Indonesia) and its vice president is Christopher Wyrod (former representative for Indonesia at The Asia Foundation).

Retired U.S. Ambassador Paul Cleveland became USINDO's second president in 2001, who was also executive director of the U.S.-New Zealand Business Council. USINDO's third president was retired U.S. Ambassador Alphonse La Porta, serving from 2004 to 2007. A career foreign service officer, Ambassador La Porta served at the U.S. Embassy in Jakarta and at the U.S. Consulate in Medan. USINDO's previous board co-chairs were Arifin Siregar (former Indonesia Ambassador to the United States) and J. Stapleton Roy (former U.S. Ambassador to Indonesia), who serves as U.S. Co-chair Emeritus. Former U.S. Ambassador to Indonesia, Paul Wolfowitz, also served as co-chair of USINDO's Board of Trustees.

USINDO implements its mission through strategic dialogues, open forum discussions, events, and exchange programs in Indonesia and the U.S. USINDO has offered several fellowships, including an annual Summer Studies program where young Americans learn about Indonesian language, culture, and society; the Sumitro Fellowship program that awards grants to American and Indonesian scholars for field research on U.S. – Indonesia relations and political-economic themes; the Edward E. Masters Fellows program that supports future leaders in the Indonesian government to attend top graduate schools in the U.S.; and the Professional Fellows Program which places American graduate students at leading Indonesian organizations for short internships. USINDO has also strengthened ties between the U.S. Congress and Indonesia's legislature through its Legislative Partnership Program. USINDO has served as the in-country partner for the Young Southeast Asian Leadership Initiative (YSEALI) for Southeast Asian and American political and community leaders.

USINDO's work contributes to strengthening the U.S.-Indonesia Comprehensive Strategic Partnership, which was signed between leaders of the two countries in November 2023. USINDO helped establish the U.S.–Indonesia Joint Council on Higher Education Partnership and the Indonesia–U.S. Council on Religion and Pluralism. USINDO also supports cultural, artistic, and social exchanges between the U.S. and Indonesia. Soon after its founding, USINDO commissioned a comprehensive study of the bilateral relationship, resulting in the publication of the book Shared Hopes, Separate Fears: Fifty Years of U.S.-Indonesia Relations written by diplomat Paul F. Gardner and published in 1997 by Westview press.

An independent organization, USINDO receives its support from corporations, individuals, donors, and foundations interested in strengthening bilateral relations between the United States and Indonesia. USINDO has received support from the Freeman Foundation, the Henry Luce Foundation, USAID, the U.S. Embassy in Jakarta, the U.S. State Department, the U.S. Department of Energy, corporate partners, and private donors in the U.S. and Indonesia. As a 501(c)(3) non-profit organization registered in the District of Columbia, USINDO does not lobby the U.S. Congress or the administration on any particular piece of legislation or policy. USINDO has approximately 15,000 network members, almost half of them residing in Indonesia, with the rest in the United States and other countries.
