= John R. Dinger =

American diplomat

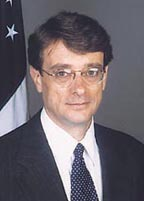

United States Ambassador to Mongolia
- In office October 19, 2000 – June 15, 2003
- President: George W. Bush
- Preceded by: Alphonse F. La Porta
- Succeeded by: Pamela Slutz

Personal details
- Born: Charles City, Iowa
- Profession: Diplomat, Career Ambassador

John R. Dinger (born May 27, 1952 in Charles City, Iowa), is a career diplomat in the United States Foreign Service. He has held leadership positions in the Department of State as Principal Deputy Assistant Secretary for Intelligence and Research, Chair of State's Cyber Policy Group, Deputy Coordinator for Counterterrorism, Ambassador to Mongolia, and Director of the State Department Office of Press Relations.

Dinger has been a Senior Inspector in the State Department's Office of the Inspector General since 2013. He was Principal Deputy Assistant Secretary for Intelligence and Research 2006–2012. He led some 300 staff and managed a $60 million budget to supply Secretaries of State Hillary Clinton and Condoleezza Rice with expert analysis of every country and every issue in the world. While in that position, he established State's first Office of Cyber Affairs, chaired its Cyber Policy Group, and pioneered the foreign policy of cyberspace.

Dinger was Deputy Coordinator for Counterterrorism at the State Department 2003–2005. He developed significant portions of U.S. counterterrorism policy. He advocated in interagency debates State Department positions on counterterrorism strategies, plans, and operations. He led the U.S. Government's interagency, rapid-reaction terrorism response team, ensuring that it was trained and poised to respond to a terrorist incident anywhere in the world.

As Ambassador to Mongolia 2000–2003, Dinger developed and promoted policies to achieve U.S. goals in Mongolia. He successfully persuaded Mongolian Airlines to lease its first new airplane from Boeing, smoothed Coca-Cola's opening of its first plant in Mongolia, and convinced Mongolia to send troops to Iraq, marking the first time Mongolia's military operated outside its borders since Genghis Khan.

When he directed the State Department's Office of Press Relations 1997–1998, Dinger was in charge of all major State Department press events, including daily press briefings. He helped develop all public diplomacy strategies of that era and advocated U.S. foreign policy positions to U.S. and foreign media in hundreds of print, radio, and TV interviews. He prepared Secretaries Christopher and Albright for appearances before the press.

Dinger is a native of the small town of Riceville, Iowa. He and his brother, Larry Dinger, have the distinction of being the first siblings in history to rise through the career ranks of the United States Foreign Service to become Ambassadors: Larry to Micronesia and Fiji and John to Mongolia.

Diplomatic posts
Preceded by Alphonse F. La Porta	U.S. Ambassador to Mongolia; 2000–2003	Succeeded by Pamela Slutz
