= Jennifer Zimdahl Galt =

American diplomat (born 1959)

Jennifer Galt
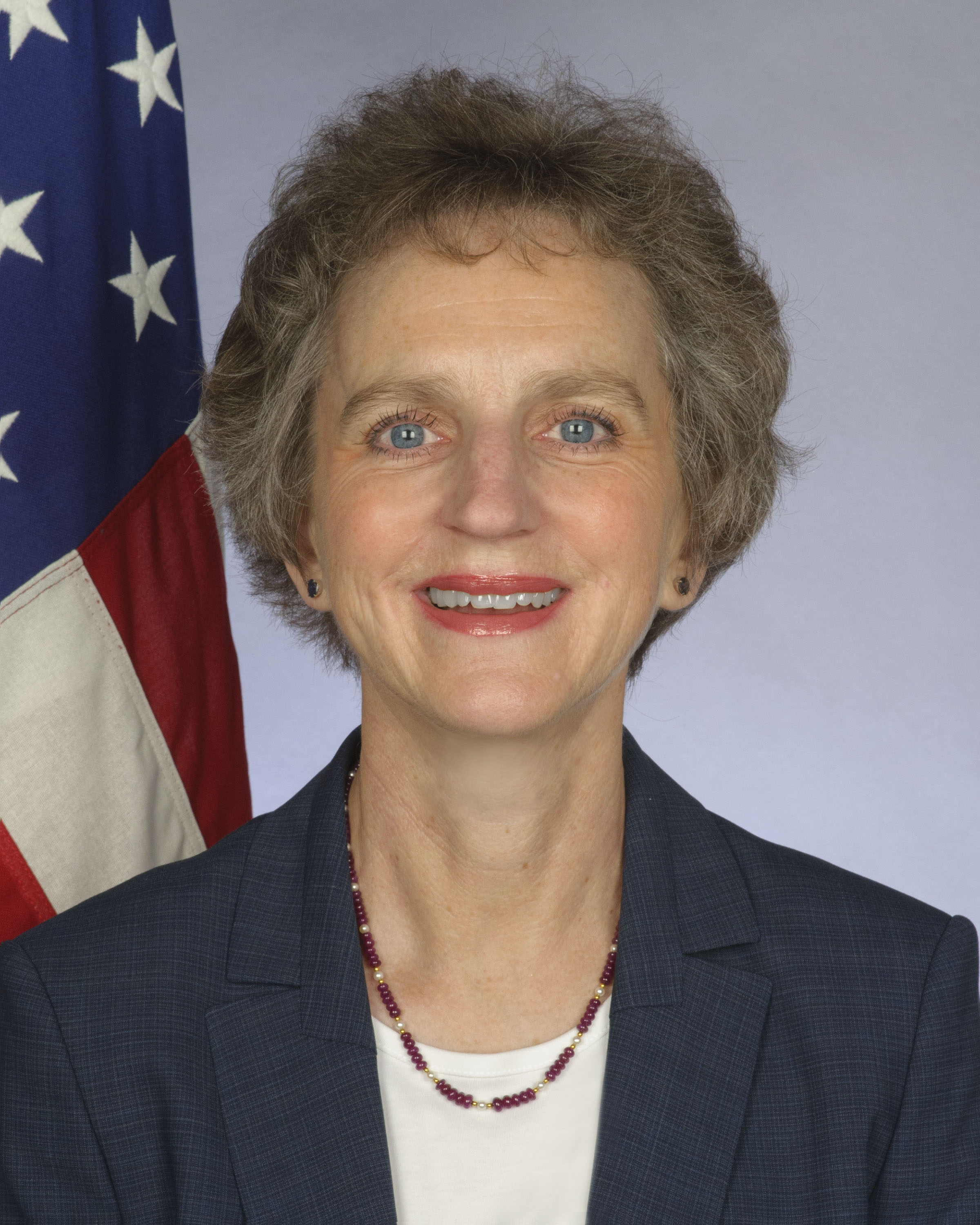

Assistant Secretary of State for Educational and Cultural Affairs Acting
- In office November 13, 2017 – March 29, 2018
- President: Donald Trump
- Preceded by: Mark Taplin
- Succeeded by: Marie Royce

United States Ambassador to Mongolia
- In office October 5, 2015 – November 10, 2017
- President: Barack Obama; Donald Trump
- Preceded by: Piper Campbell
- Succeeded by: Michael S. Klecheski

Personal details
- Born: 1959 (age 66–67)
- Education: Colorado College; Johns Hopkins University; National Defense University

Jennifer Ann Zimdahl Galt (born 1959) is a U.S. diplomat currently serving as the Foreign Policy Advisor to the United States Indo-Pacific Command. Galt was the United States Ambassador to Mongolia from 2015 to 2017.

On May 6, 2015, President Barack Obama nominated Jennifer Zimdahl Galt to be Ambassador of the United States of America to Mongolia. She was confirmed by the Senate on August 5, 2015, and was sworn in on September 15, 2015.

Ambassador Galt, a career member of the Senior Foreign Service, formerly served as Principal Officer of the U.S. Consulate General, Guangzhou, China, where she led and mentored a team of nearly 500, comprising 133 American officers, of whom 62 were first- and second-tour, and over 300 locally engaged Chinese colleagues.

Ambassador Galt's previous postings overseas have included Belgrade, Taipei with the American Institute in Taiwan, Consulate General in Mumbai, Embassy in Beijing, Consulate General in Shanghai, and the U.S. Mission to the North Atlantic Treaty Organization (NATO) in Brussels. In Washington, Ambassador Galt served as Senior Advisor in the United States Department of State’s Bureau of Public Affairs and as Deputy Director for Public Diplomacy in the Bureau of East Asian and Pacific Affairs.

Ambassador Galt holds master's degrees from National Defense University and from the Johns Hopkins University School of Advanced International Studies (SAIS), as well as a bachelor's degree in political science, history and languages from Colorado College in her home state of Colorado. She is fluent in Mandarin and French, and also speaks Italian, Spanish and Serbian. She has two children, Phoebe and Dylan Galt and a husband, Fritz Galt.

== See also ==
- List of ambassadors of the United States

Diplomatic posts
Preceded by Piper Campbell	United States Ambassador to Mongolia; 2015–2017	Succeeded by Michael S. Klecheski
