= Roger D. Pierce =

American diplomat and foreign service officer

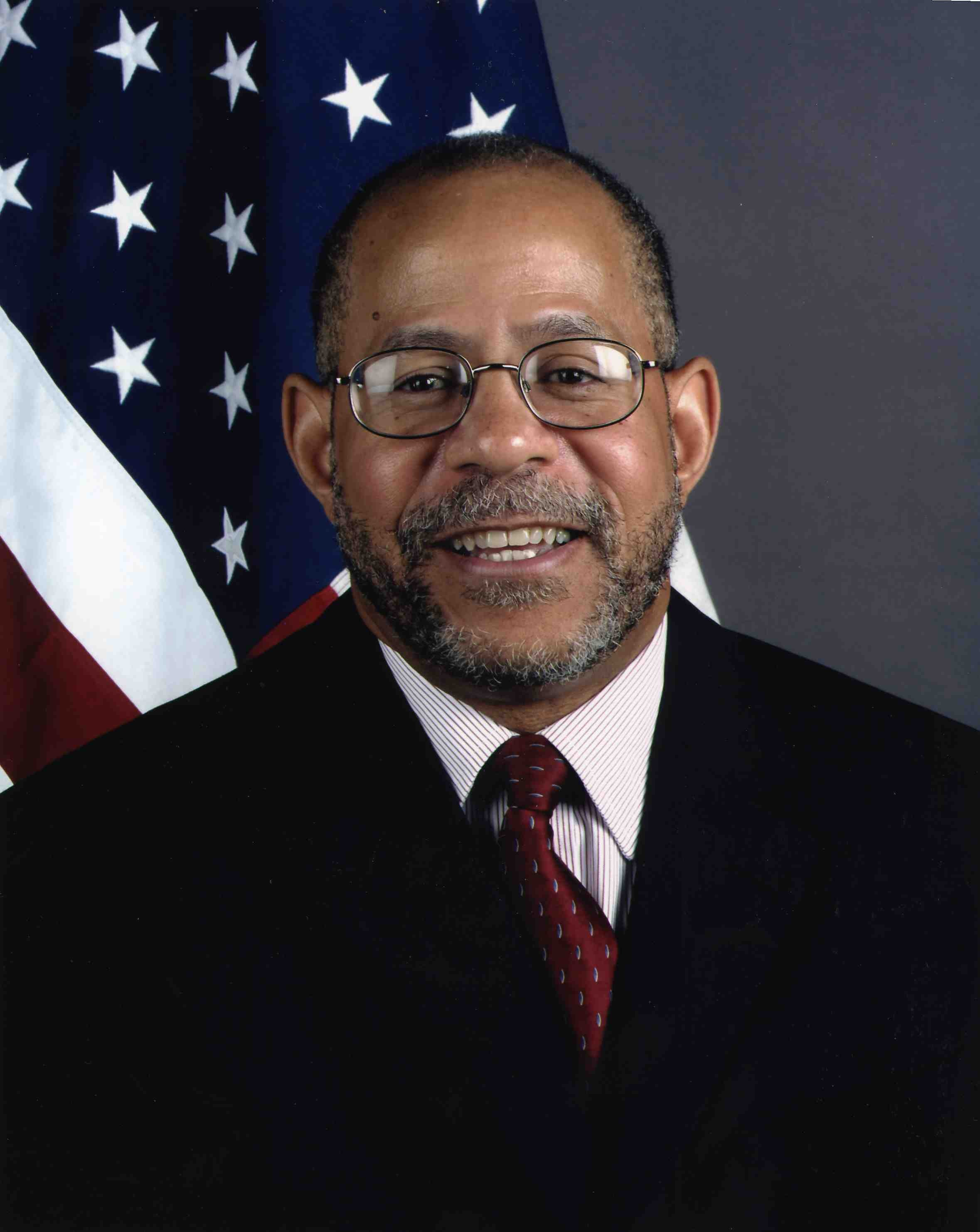
Roger D Pierce

Roger Dwayne Pierce (born 1951) is a United States diplomat and a career foreign service officer with the Department of State. As of 2008, he is serving as the foreign policy advisor with the U.S. Special Operations Command. His previous assignment was the post of Ambassador to the Republic of Cape Verde. He served in that post 2005–08.

Pierce is a career member of the Senior Foreign Service, class of Minister Counselor. Pierce entered on duty in the Foreign Service in 1978. He has served abroad as consular officer in Mexico City (Mexico), Santiago (Chile), and as Chief of the Consular Section in Calcutta (India), and Istanbul (Turkey.) He served as Principal Officer in Amsterdam (the Netherlands) and Consul General in Cairo (Egypt). Pierce has held domestic assignments in the State Department's Office of Caribbean Affairs, where he was the desk officer for the Bahamas, Trinidad and Tobago, the Netherlands Antilles, the Cayman Islands, and the Turks and Caicos Islands. He served also in the Office of Inspector General. Most recently, he was the Deputy Chief of Mission at the U.S. Embassy in Tegucigalpa (Honduras).

Pierce received a Bachelor of Arts degree in Spanish language and Latin American Studies from Davis and Elkins College, Elkins, West Virginia, and a Master of Arts degree in Latin American Literature from the University of Maryland. In 1995, he graduated from the U.S. Army War College in Carlisle Barracks, Pennsylvania. Pierce is a graduate of the 44th Senior Seminar, the Department's highest level leadership and management training program.

Pierce is currently serving as the Diplomat in Residence at the Josef Korbel School of International Studies at the University of Denver.

== Notes ==
Diplomatic posts
Preceded by Donald C. Johnson	United States Ambassador to Cape Verde; 2005–2008	Succeeded by Marianne M. Myles
