= Anne Casper =

American diplomat (born 1965)

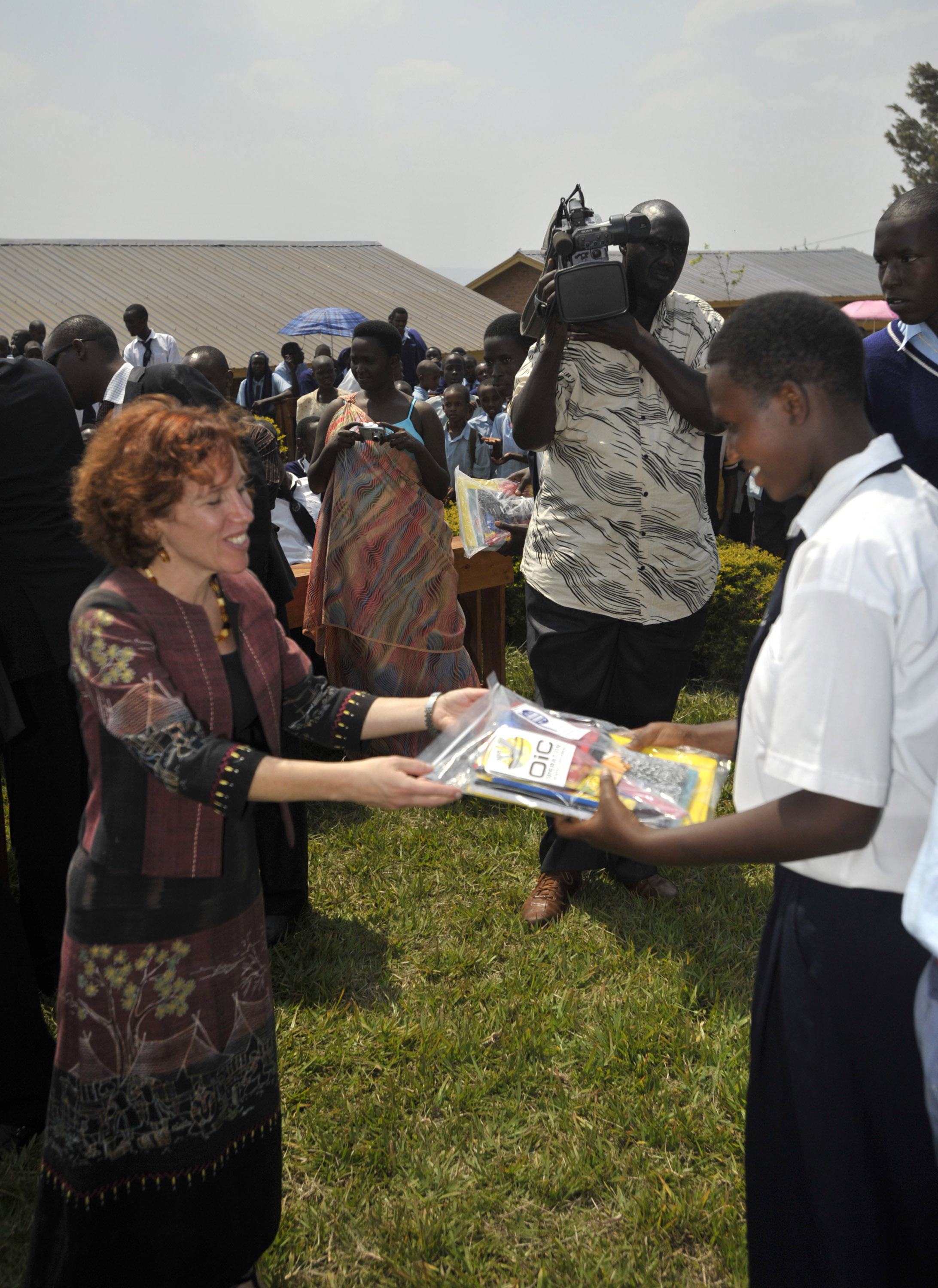
- Casper on her official duties in Rwanda in 2010

United States Ambassador to Burundi
- In office October 20, 2016 – May 5, 2019
- President: Barack Obama; Donald Trump
- Preceded by: Dawn M. Liberi
- Succeeded by: Eunice Reddick; Chargé d’Affaires

Personal details
- Born: 1965 (age 60–61) Las Vegas, Nevada
- Spouse: Karl Deringer
- Education: Tufts University, Paul H. Nitze School of Advanced International Studies; National War College

Anne S. Casper (born 1965) is an American diplomat who served as United States Ambassador to Burundi from 2016 to 2019.

== Consular career ==
Casper joined the Foreign Service in 1993. Her early assignments were as political and military officer in Tirana, Albania, as deputy public affairs officer at the Jerusalem consulate and as cultural affairs officer in Damascus, Syria. In 2001, Casper was recalled and given the place of counterterrorism policy officer at the Office of the Coordinator for Counterterrorism.

The next year, she was made Arabic media liaison officer in the Bureau of Near Eastern Affairs, a job in which she stayed until 2004, when she was temporarily relieved of her duties to study an M.S. at the National War College.

Casper returned to active duty in 2005 and was sent to be public affairs counselor in Bangkok, Thailand. In 2009, she was posted to Kigali, Rwanda where she was deputy chief of mission. While working in Rwanda, her husband, Karl Deringer, won a State Department award for his charity work.

In 2012, Casper was assigned to the consulate in Jeddah, Saudi Arabia as consul general until her return to Washington D.C. in 2014 to work as deputy assistant secretary for international media. Casper was moved to be a senior adviser at the Center for Strategic Counterterrorism Communications. In 2016, Casper was also appointed the acting director of partnerships for the Global Engagement Center.

In May 2016, President Obama nominated Casper for the post of ambassador to Burundi. She was confirmed on the 29 June. She presented her credentials on October 20, 2016, and served until May 5, 2019.

== Personal life ==
Caspar earned her Bachelor of Arts degree, summa cum laude, in anthropology from Tufts University, and a Master of Arts degree from Johns Hopkins University’s School for Advanced International Studies. She earned a master's degree in National Security Stragey from the National War College.

Casper's brother is assistant U.S. Attorney, Larry Casper. She is married to Karl Deringer.

Casper can speak Arabic, French, Kirundi, Thai, Hebrew and Kinyarwanda.

Diplomatic posts
Preceded by Dawn M. Liberi	United States Ambassador to Burundi; 2016–2019	Succeeded by Eunice Reddick; Chargé d’Affaires
