= Richard Buangan =

American diplomat

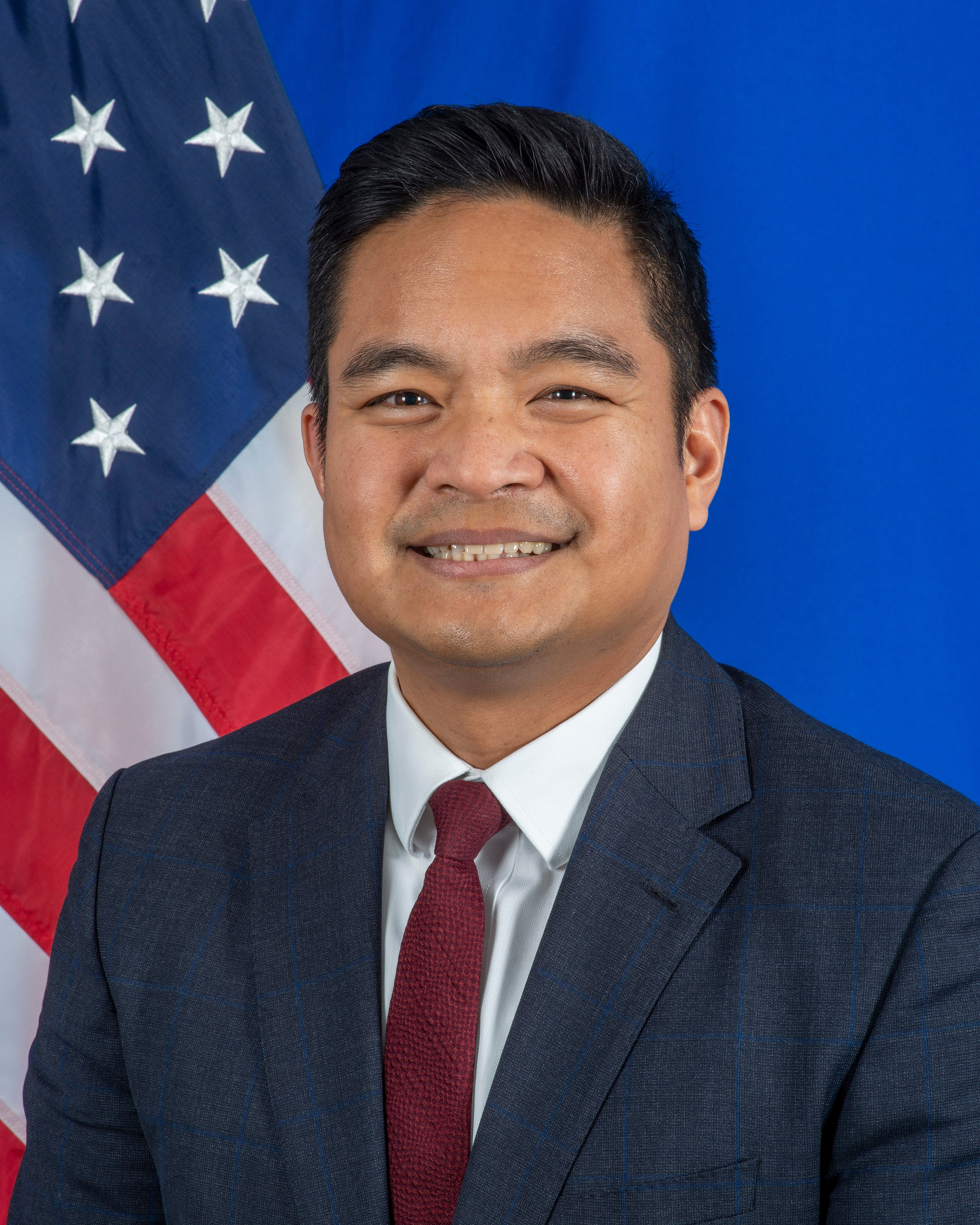

United States Ambassador to Mongolia
- Incumbent
- Assumed office November 17, 2022
- President: Joe Biden; Donald Trump
- Preceded by: Michael S. Klecheski

Personal details
- Born: Richard Lee Buangan San Diego, California, U.S.
- Education: St. Edward's University (BA)

Richard Lee Buangan is an American diplomat who has served as United States ambassador to Mongolia since November 2022.

== Early life and education ==
Born and raised in a Filipino American family in San Diego, Buangan earned a Bachelor of Science degree in political science and economics from St. Edward's University.

== Career ==
Buangan is a career member of the Senior Foreign Service, with the rank of Minister-Counselor. He currently serves as the Principal Deputy Assistant Secretary in the Bureau of Global Public Affairs at the U.S State Department. Previously, Buangan served as Deputy Assistant Secretary in the Bureau of East Asian and Pacific Affairs, and as the Executive Assistant to then Secretary of State Mike Pompeo. Earlier, Buangan served as managing director for International Media in the Bureau of Public Affairs, as the Public Affairs Officer of the then-U.S. Consulate General, Jerusalem, and as Deputy Press Attaché and then as Embassy Spokesperson of the U.S. Embassy in Beijing, China. Buangan had also served as a staff officer in the Executive Secretariat of the Department of State, and held overseas assignments in Paris, France and Abidjan, Ivory Coast.

During his career, Buangan served as an embassy spokesman.

=== United States ambassador to Mongolia ===
On April 22, 2022, President Joe Biden announced his intent to nominate Buangan to be the next United States ambassador to Mongolia. On April 25, 2022, his nomination was sent to the Senate. Hearings on his nomination were held before the Senate Foreign Relations Committee on July 13, 2022. The committee favorably reported his nomination to the Senate floor on July 19, 2022. His nomination was confirmed by the full Senate via voice vote on August 5, 2022. He was sworn into office on October 12, 2022. He arrived in the country on October 20, 2022. He presented his credentials to President Ukhnaagiin Khürelsükh on November 17, 2022.

== Awards and recognitions ==
Buangan has won multiple performance awards from the State Department.

== Personal life ==
Buangan speaks Mandarin Chinese, French, and Spanish.

Diplomatic posts
Preceded by Michael S. Klecheski	United States Ambassador to Mongolia; 2022–present	Incumbent
