= Patricia Moller =

American diplomat

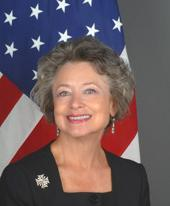
Patricia Newton Moller ambassador

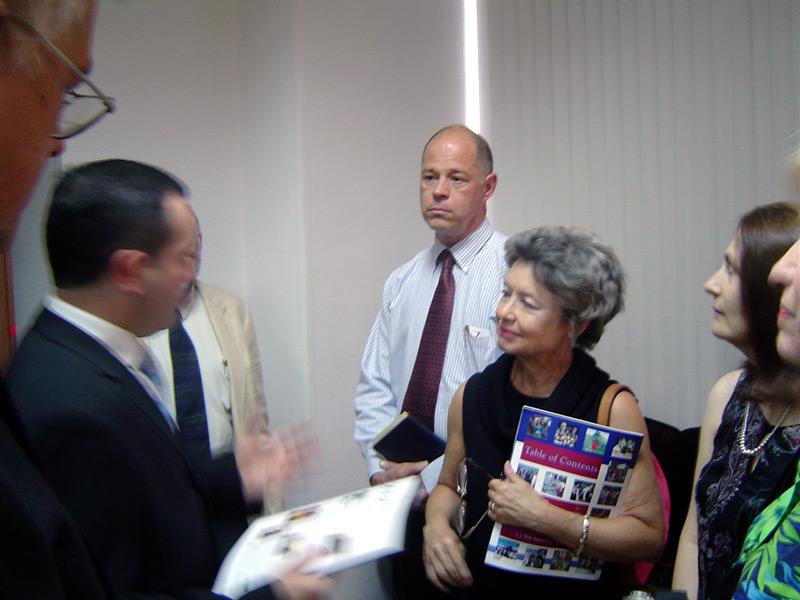
Deputy Chief of Mission, Patricia Moller discusses potential sister city projects with Mayor Chiaberashvili (July 11, 2005)

Patricia Newton Moller (born 1944) is a retired investment banker and American diplomat who became a business consultant. Her company, Moller Global Advisory LLC, helps companies that want to do business in developing countries. Moller worked as an investment banker with Smith Barney Harris Upham before working for the State Department.

== Biography ==
Moller was Ambassador Extraordinary and Plenipotentiary to Guinea from March 26, 2010, until September 12, 2012. She was Ambassador to Burundi (March 4, 2006-June 2009). She was also Deputy Chief of Mission (DCM) to Georgia (country).

Moller earned a bachelor's degree in history from the University of Tampa.

== See also ==
- Article on Wikipedia Germany
