= List of ambassadors of Mongolia to the United States =

Coordinates: 38.905369°N 77.057919°W

Ambassador of Mongolia to the United States Embassy of Mongolia, Washington, D.C.
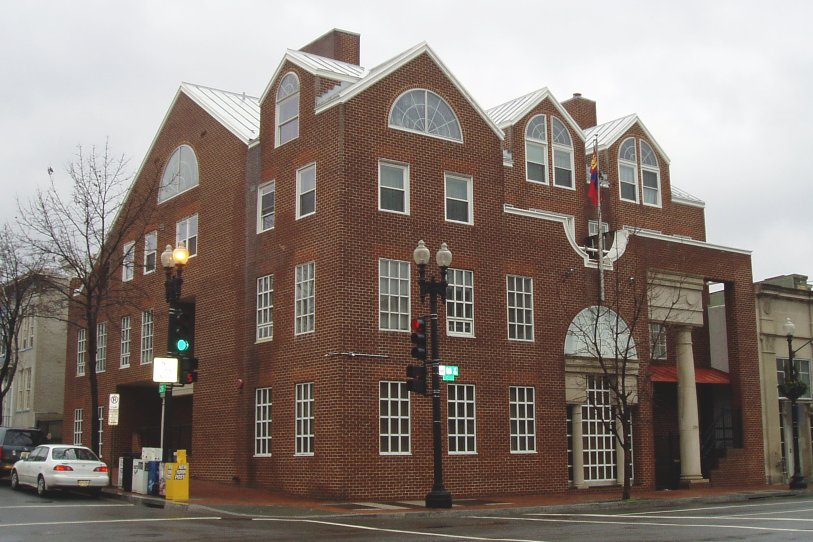
- Incumbent; Yondongiin Otgonbayar since March 28, 2017
- Inaugural holder: Gendengiin Nyamdoo
- Formation: May 11, 1989

The Mongolian ambassador in Washington, D. C. is the official representative of the Government in Ulaanbaatar to the Government of the United States.

== List of representatives ==
Diplomatic agrément	Diplomatic accreditation	Ambassador	Observations	Prime Minister of Mongolia	List of presidents of the United States	Term end
January 27, 1987			The governments of Jambyn Batmönkh and Ronald Reagan established diplomatic relations	Jambyn Batmönkh	Ronald Reagan	
March 21, 1989	May 11, 1989	Gendengiin Nyamdoo		Punsalmaagiin Ochirbat	George H. W. Bush	
October 1, 1991	November 25, 1991	Luvsandorjiin Davaagiv		Punsalmaagiin Ochirbat	George H. W. Bush	
September 27, 1995	December 12, 1995	Jalbuugiin Choinhor		Puntsagiin Jasrai	Bill Clinton	
February 7, 2003	February 26, 2003	Ravdangiin Bold		Nambaryn Enkhbayar	George W. Bush	
April 2, 2008	April 9, 2008	Khasbazaryn Bekhbat		Sanjaagiin Bayar	George W. Bush	
January 8, 2013	January 14, 2013	Bulgaagiin Altangerel		Norovyn Altankhuyag	Barack Obama	
March 23, 2018	March 28, 2018	Yondongiin Otgonbayar		Ukhnaagiin Khürelsükh	Donald Trump	
2021		Ulziidelger Batbayar		Luvsannamsrain Ouyn-Erdene	Joe Biden	
