= African Americans in foreign policy =

In the United States

African Americans in foreign policy in the United States catalogs distinguished African Americans who have and continue to contribute to international development, diplomacy, and defense through their work with the U.S. Department of State, the U.S. Agency for International Development (USAID), the U.S. Information Agency, and the U.S. Congress, and other notable agencies and non-governmental organizations. The creators acknowledge the presence of the interagency contributions to the foreign affairs realm, and welcome additional content to showcase the achievements of African Americans in other relevant U.S. government agencies.

African Americans have mobilized to make visible issues to be reflected in American foreign policy decisions. African Americans continue to leverage knowledge of global issues and create linkages with people of color throughout the world to gain insight and allies in the struggle for equal rights. Whether the influence came from civic organizations, religious institutions or charismatic leaders, the African American voice has not been silent in articulating their views on how foreign policy should be created. African Americans also made recommendations and participated in the formation of foreign policy of the United States to shape domestic policy regarding civil and human rights.

The first African American diplomat, Yale graduate Ebenezer Don Carlos Bassett, was appointed by President Ulysses S. Grant as Minister Resident and Consul General in Haiti in 1869. From Bassett's appointment in 1869 through the 1930s, the United States sent scores of African American ministers, consuls, and other officials to regions including Latin America, Europe, Asia, and Africa. Many of these officials (including Frederick Douglass, James Weldon Johnson, Archibald Grimké, George Washington Ellis, and Henry Francis Downing) were also literary writers, and their work in international diplomacy influenced the ways in which they approached racial diplomacy during the New Negro era and the Harlem Renaissance. Between Bassett's appointment in 1869, every appointed ambassador to Haiti was African American except for one until Madison Roswell Smith was appointed in 1912.

It was not until 1924 when the Rogers Act combined the Consular and Diplomatic Service that James Carter and William Yerby became the first African Americans to enter the regular career Foreign Service. They were joined by Clifton Wharton, Sr. who was named Ambassador to Norway in 1961. After Wharton, Sr., no other African American entered the Foreign Service for the next 20 years. During this period, the U.S. Agency for International Development and its predecessor organization also hired a number of African Americans who distinguished themselves as senior diplomats.

African American ambassadors and senior diplomats have not all come from the ranks of the State Department and USAID. The former United States Information Agency began an active recruitment effort aimed at African Americans in the latter part of the 1950s and 1960s and attracted numerous officers who achieved ambassadorial rank. African Americans have also played a major role in international affairs with the United Nations and United States Congress. Recent efforts made by Secretaries of State Madeleine Albright, Colin L. Powell and Condoleezza Rice, and Hillary Clinton to increase diversity in the Department and to attract more minorities to the Foreign Service bode well for augmenting the under-representative number of African Americans in the Service and for achieving a broader geographical distribution of African American Ambassadors throughout the world.

== Pioneers in the industry ==
This section spotlights pioneers in the industry, the first African Americans to represent the U.S. government abroad, and those who have represented the U.S. government foreign affairs agencies at the highest levels.

First African American diplomat

Ebenezer Don Carlos Basset was the first African American diplomat. He was Minister Resident and Consul General in Haiti from 1869 to 1877.

Vincent Lamantia of New Orleans was a Sicilian-Egyptian diplomat and General Consul to Catania, Sicily from the USA appointed by President Grover Cleveland in 1887 according to Senate nomination. Lamantia would have been the first or one of the first US diplomats to a European nation in 1887 as Sicily became part of the Kingdom of Italy on 17 March 1861.

First African American consul

On October 29, 1845, Thomas O. Larkin, U.S. Consul in Monterey, California (then part of Mexico) appointed William A. Leidesdorff as Vice Consul at Yerba Buena (now San Francisco). Leidesdorff was born in the Danish West Indies (now the U.S. Virgin Islands) to a Danish planter and an Afro-Caribbean woman in 1810. He was naturalized as a U.S. citizen in 1834 while living in New Orleans. While living in California, he became a Mexican citizen in 1844 in order to increase his landholdings. His service as Vice Consul lasted until U.S. forces occupied northern California in July 1846. Leidesdorff died in San Francisco on May 18, 1848.

First African American Ambassador

Edward R. Dudley was appointed Minister to Liberia in 1948 and promoted to Ambassador to Liberia in 1949.

First African American Woman Ambassador

Patricia Roberts Harris was the first African American Woman in U.S. history to hold the rank of ambassador when she was appointed as Ambassador to Luxembourg on June 4, 1965, and presented her credentials on September 7. She served until September 22, 1967.

First African American Career Ambassador

In 1990, Terence Todman was the first African American to be promoted to the rank of Career Ambassador, the highest rank in the Foreign Service.

First African American Woman Career Ambassador

Ruth A. Davis is the first African American woman to be promoted to the rank of Career Ambassador, the highest rank in the Foreign Service. As Director of the Foreign Service Institute (1977–2001) Davis established the School of Leadership and Management and as Director General of the Foreign Service (2001 to 2003) she led the Diplomatic Readiness Initiative, increasing staffing and better enabling the Department to meet the foreign policy challenges of the 21st century.

First African American Foreign Service Officer

Clifton Reginald Wharton Sr. joined the Foreign Service in 1925, after passing the Foreign Service Exam in 1924. He became the first African American Foreign Service Officer to become chief of a diplomatic mission when he was appointed Minister to Romania on February 5, 1958. This appointment made him the first of his race to be chief of a diplomatic mission to a European country. He served in Romania until October 21, 1960. He then served as Ambassador to Norway from April 18, 1961, to September 4, 1964.

First African American Medical Director

Dr. LaRae Washington Kemp served as the Assistant Secretary of the Department of State for Health Affairs and Medical Director for the U.S. State Department and Foreign Service (1991–1994).

First African American Civil Service Employee to Serve as Ambassador

Barry L. Wells is the first African American Civil Service employee to serve as a United States Ambassador. Before his December 2007 appointment as Ambassador to the Gambia, Wells was named in February 2007, as the Department's first Chief diversity officer following a 17-year career at the Foreign Service Institute, and culminated as Deputy Director.

First African American Secretary of State

Colin Powell was appointed United States Secretary of State by President George W. Bush in January 2001, was the inaugural African American Secretary of State. As Secretary of State, he was the highest-ranking official of the Department. Prior to Secretary Powell, Clifton R. Wharton, Jr. had been the highest-ranking African American in the Department.

First African American Woman Secretary of State

Condoleezza Rice became the 66th Secretary of State under President George W. Bush on January 26, 2005, and is the first African American woman to serve as Secretary of State. As Secretary of State, she is the highest-ranking official of the Department.

First African American Deputy Secretary of State

Clifton R. Wharton, Jr. was the first African American to hold the number two position in the State Department, Deputy Secretary of State from January 27 to November 8, 1973. He is the son of pioneering Foreign Service Officer Amb. Clifton R. Wharton, Sr.

First African American Assistant Secretary of State

Barbara M. Watson became Administrator of the Bureau of Security and Consular Affairs on July 31, 1968, and served until December 31, 1974. She was re-appointed on April 7, 1977. On August 17 of that year, she became Assistant Secretary of State for Consular Affairs, and served until September 11, 1980. She was also the first woman who held the title of Assistant Secretary, and later served as Ambassador to Malaysia in 1980–81.

First African American to Represent the United States at the United Nations

Edith S. Sampson is an American diplomat who was appointed by President Harry Truman as an alternate U.S. delegate to the United Nations in August 1950, making her the first African American to officially represent the United States at the UN.

First African American to Serve as Deputy United States Ambassador to the United Nations

James Nabrit Jr. was appointed by President Lyndon B. Johnson to serve as Deputy United States Ambassador to the United Nations from 1965 to 1967, becoming the first African American to hold this position.

First African American President of the United States

Barack Obama was the first African American President of the United States. During his presidency, he was involved in directing U.S. foreign policy, including efforts to end the war in Iraq, modernize the military, address the proliferation of weapons of mass destruction, strengthen international alliances and partnerships, and provide foreign aid while supporting democratic institutions abroad.

First African American (and South Asian) Vice-President of the United States

Kamala Harris is the first African American and South Asian Vice President of the United States. She is the highest-ranking female elected official in U.S. history.

First African American Secretary of Defense

Lloyd Austin is a four-star general, who was nominated by President Biden to be the Secretary of Defense. He is the first African American to hold this role.

=== Notable mentions ===
- John Edward West Thompson was nominated on May 7, 1885, by President Cleveland minister resident and consul-general to Haiti.
- James Milton Turner was chosen by President Grant to be the U.S. minister resident consul general to Liberia 1871–1878. Despite his humble beginning as a slave, James Milton Turner became a prominent African American politician during the Reconstruction period in the United States.
- William Frank Powell (1848–1920), on June 17, 1897, became the first American appointed to the new title of envoy extraordinary and minister plenipotentiary to Haiti (and also chargé d'affaires to the Dominican Republic) by President McKinley.
- John L. Waller was appointed consul at Tamatave, Madagascar in February 1891. He served at this post until January 1894.
- John Terres served as U.S. consul at Port-au-Prince in 1905.
- Frederick Douglass, a known abolitionist, served as chargé d'affaires at the Embassy of the Dominican Republic in 1899.
- William H. Hunt, William Yerby, and James Carter, were the first African American FSOs, "grandfathered" in when the Rogers Act took effect in 1924, combining consular and diplomatic service.
- Lester Aglar Walton was referred to as the "Dean of the Diplomatic Corps". On July 2, 1935, he was appointed envoy extraordinary and minister plenipotentiary to Liberia, by President Franklin D. Roosevelt. Walton was appointed United States minister in July 1935. Though he served in the capacity of an Ambassador, the U.S. Embassy in Monrovia was not elevated to Embassy status until 1949, so his title was not officially worded as such.
- John L. Withers Sr. was among the first African Americans to enter the Foreign Service. He worked for what became the U.S. Agency for International Development and was assigned to Laos, Thailand, Burma, Korea, Ethiopia and Kenya. He ended his career as director of the USAID mission to India, then one of the largest foreign aid programs in the world.l
- Aurelia E. Brazeal was the first African American female Foreign Service Officer (FSO) to rise from the entry level to the senior ranks of the Foreign Service. She became Ambassador to Micronesia, Kenya and Ethiopia and Deputy Assistant Secretary for East Asian and Pacific Affairs.
- Ruth A. Davis was appointed as Ambassador to the Republic of Benin and the first African American woman to serve as Director of the Foreign Service Institute and Director General of the Foreign Service.
- The first Black American appointed U.S. Ambassador on multiple occasions was Mercer Cook (Niger, 1961; Senegal,1964; The Gambia, 1965)
- Four African Americans, including Terence Todman, Ruth A. Davis, Johnny Young and George E. Moose, former Assistant Secretary for African Affairs, have been promoted to Career Ambassador, the highest rank in the Foreign Service. Also, five have been appointed Director General of the Foreign Service (DG) including Ambassadors Linda Thomas-Greenfield, Harry K. Thomas and his predecessor, George M. Staples. The first African American to serve as Director General was Ambassador Edward J. Perkins, who also served as U.S. Ambassador to South Africa during the apartheid era.
- Ambassador Alfonso Lenhardt was appointed the 36th Sergeant-at-Arms of the United States Senate on September 4, 2001, and became the first African American to serve as an officer of the Congress. He retired from the U.S. Army in August 1997 as a major general with more than 30 years of service in leadership positions.
- Terrence A. Todman is the Black American who served as U.S. Ambassador on the most occasions – six. Among all U.S. Ambassadors only Ambassador Thomas Pickering, who was U.S. Ambassador to seven different postings – the United Nations, Russia, India, Israel, Nigeria, Jordan, and El Salvador – has been appointed more times than Ambassador TodmanMcLellan, Carlton. "America's Ambassadors of African Descent: A Brief History" (PDF)..

== U.S. Information Agency ==
This section highlights African American leadership in the public diplomacy realm through USIA

Carl Rowan - USIA Director - 1964, appointed d by President Lyndon B. Johnson. In serving as director of the USIA, Rowan became the first African American to hold a seat on the National Security Council and the highest level African American in the United States government.

== U.S. Agency for International Development ==
This section highlights African Americans leaders in the field of International Development.

USAID Administrator

- Alonzo Fulgham is the former Acting Administrator of the United States Agency for International Development (USAID). On January 27, 2009, he was appointed by President Barack Obama as Acting Administrator of USAID, replacing Henrietta Fore. Prior to this appointment, from 2006 to 2009 he served as Chief Operating Officer of USAID.
- Alfonso Lenhardt became Acting Administrator of the United States Agency for International Development on February 20, 2015, after having been appointed as Deputy Administrator in 2014.

Agency Counselor

- Aaron Williams, currently serves as Director of the Peace Corps and served at USAID in a number of capacities including senior position of Agency Counselor.
- Mosina Jordan became Agency Counselor to USAID in 2005. The Counselor is the most senior career officer position in the Agency and serves as ombudsman for career employees. Jordan had been USAID's Senior Deputy Assistant Administrator in the Bureau for Latin America and the Caribbean and American Ambassador to the Central African Republic. Jordan has served as Mission Director in Jamaica, Barbados, and Guyana.
- Clinton White became the Agency Counselor to USAID

USAID General Counsel

- Wandra G Mitchell was appointed in 1993 by President William J Clinton as first African American female to head the Office of General Counsel. Earlier in her career, she had served as a Foreign Service Officer in USAID's regional office in Côte d'Ivoire.
- Singleton McCallister was appointed in 1997 by President William J. Clinton as the second African American female to head the Office of the General Counsel.

Assistant and Deputy Assistant Administrators

- Goler T. Butcher was appointed as Assistant Administrator for the Bureau for Africa under President Jimmy Carter.
- Samuel Adams served as Assistant Administrator for Africa 1970–76 and served as Mission Director to a number of countries.
- John Hicks served as Assistant Administrator for the Bureau for Africa between 1993 and 1996, Senior Deputy Assistant Administrator for the Bureau for Africa 1991–1993, and Acting Assistant Administrator for the Bureau for Food and Voluntary Assistance in 1991. In 1993, Mr. Hicks was appointed by President William Clinton and confirmed by the U.S. Senate as U.S. Ambassador to Eritrea. Prior to his Ambassadorial posting, Mr. Hicks served as Mission Director for USAID/Liberia 1988–1990, USAID/Malawi 1985–1988, and USAID/Zimbabwe 1983–1985.
- Karen D. Turner was the director of the Office of Development Partners at USAID and served in USAID management positions as AID Representative for the West Bank, Deputy Mission Director in USAID/Indonesia, Deputy Assistant Administrator for the Asia Near East Bureau, and most recently as the Mission Director for USAID/Jamaica. In 2007, she was promoted to Career Minister, USAID's highest career Foreign Service level.
- Keith Brown served as USAID's Senior Deputy Assistant Administrator for Africa, and was awarded the highest career rank in the Foreign Service, career minister. From September 1997 until February 1999, Mr. Brown served as USAID/Ethiopia Mission Director.
- Vivianne Lowery-Derryck was appointed by President Clinton as the Assistant Administrator of the Bureau for Africa in March 1998.
- Constance Berry Newman served as Assistant Administrator for Africa of the U.S. Agency for International Development (USAID) from November 2001 to June 2004 and then served as Assistant Secretary of State for African Affairs.
- Denise Rollins was designated as the Acting Assistant Administrator for the Bureau for Asia in September 2013. Prior to that, beginning in July 2011, she served as the Senior Deputy Assistant Administrator for Asia. She also served as Mission Director for USAID/Bangladesh, and Deputy Mission Director to USAID/South Africa.
- Sharon Cromer is a career Foreign Service Officer who served as Mission Director for USAID/Ghana (2017– ), Tanzania, Nigeria (2007) and Ghana (2002). She also served as USAID's Senior Deputy Assistant Administrator for Africa (2010).
- Valerie Dickson-Horton served as Deputy Assistant Administrator of the Bureau for Africa and Mission Director to Swaziland.
- Linda Etim was appointed Assistant Administrator for the Africa Bureau at the United States Agency for International Development (USAID) in 2015. Prior to that, she served as Deputy Assistant Administrator at USAID from 2012 to 2015.
- Clinton White served as the USAID Regional Representative for the East and Southern Caribbean (2019), Deputy Assistant Administrator in the Bureau for Management, USAID Senior Development Advisor to Libya.
- Kathy Body served as Deputy Chief Financial Officer for Overseas Operations from 2019.
- Gary Juste served as Senior Deputy Administrator for Human Capital and Talent Management.

USAID Mission Directors

- Dr. Frank Pinder served as USAID/Ghana Mission Director 1966–1971.
- Fermino Spencer served as Mission Director to Zaire from 1972 to 1974.
- Dr. Vernon Johnson served as USAID/Tanzania Mission Director 1968–70, USAID/Uganda Mission Director 1970–73, and Deputy Assistant Secretary of State in the African Affairs Bureau.
- Dr. Carlos Nelson served as USAID/Kenya Mission Director in the mid-1970s.
- Sheldon Cole served as USAID/Malawi Mission Director where he was posted in 1979.
- Irvin Coker served as USAID/Ghana Mission Director from 1976 to 1980. In 1983, Irv was appointed Mission Director, Uganda until July 1986. After that position, he was appointed Senior USAID Coordination Officer, U. S. Mission to the United Nations until he retired in September 1988. Mr. Coker achieved the rank of Career Minister in 1985.
- Howard Steverson served as USAID/Tanzania Mission Director after being appointed in 1976.
- Hermon Davis served as USAID/Tunisia Mission Director between 1975 and 1977. He also served in Mali earlier.
- Jay Johnson, a career foreign service officer serves as Mission Director to USAID/Cameroon and was appointed Career Minister (highest Foreign Service rank) by President Ronald Reagan in 1985.
- George Jones serve as Mission Director to USAID/Kenya 2000, USAID/Eritrea 1995, and Acting Mission Director for USAID/Mauritania 1988.
- Myron Golden served as USAID/Senegal and USAID/Burundi Mission Director between 1992 and 1997.
- Julius E. Coles served as USAID/Swaziland and USAID/Senegal Mission Director and is a former President of Africare.
- Lucretia Taylor served as USAID/Tanzania Mission Director and Acting USAID/Liberia Mission Director between 1998 and 2003.
- Harry Lightfoot was sworn in as Mission Director to USAID/Benin in 2000.
- Wilbur Thomas served as Mission Director to USAID/Guinea, USAID/Liberia, and USAID/Macedonia.
- Annette Adams served as Mission Director for USAID/Guinea, after being sworn in July 2002.
- Peter Hubbard served as Mission Director to USAID/Guyana between 2006 and 2008.
- Mark Anthony White serves as the USAID Mission Director to India (2017–2021). Mr. Mark Anthony White served as the Mission Director to USAID/Timor-Leste between 2008 and 2010.
- Art Brown currently serves as the Mission Director for USAID/Zimbabwe. From 2016 to 2020 he served as the Mission Director for USAID/Dominican Republic. From 2012 to 2015 he served as Mission Director for USAID/Nicaragua. He also served as Deputy Mission Director to USAID/Afghanistan (Kabul), and Deputy Mission Director to USAID/Democratic Republic of the Congo (Kinshasa). Art Brown was a Peace Corps Volunteer in Benin, West Africa from 1991 to 1995.
- Henderson Patrick served as Mission Director to USAID/Senegal and the West Africa Regional Mission
- Rudolph "Rudy" Thomas serves as the Mission Director to USAID/Madagascar 2009–Present, and previously USAID/Benin from 2004 to 2008, USAID/Liberia from 1997 to 2001, and served as Deputy Mission Director at USAID/Zambia from 1993 to 1997 and USAID/Uganda from 2002 to 2004.
- Lawrence Hardy served as Mission Director to USAID/Brazil, and USAID/Philippines.
- Elzadia Washington served as Mission Director to USAID/Namibia (2011–2013) and Deputy Mission Director to USAID/Brazil, USAID/Uganda and USAID/Philippines. She is a career foreign service officer who also served in Mali, Belize, Cameroon, Egypt, and Haiti.
- Michelle Godette served as USAID Mission Director to Madagascar and USAID Mission Director to Sierra Leone and Guinea.
- Paul Weisenfeld served as USAID Mission Director to Zimbabwe and Peru.
- James Watson currently served as USAID Mission Director to Honduras and was former Deputy Mission Director in the Dominican Republic.
- John Marc Winfield served as USAID Mission Director to Liberia and was former Deputy Mission Director to Uganda.
- Gary Juste served as USAID Senior Development Advisor to USAID/Libya (2015–2016), USAID Mission Director in Mali (2013–2015) and Deputy Mission Director for USAID/South Africa (2007–2009).
- Jason D. Fraser served as USAID Country Representative in Jamaica, USAID Mission Director in Rwanda and USAID Mission Director in Angola. Mr. Fraser formerly served as Deputy Mission Director in Ethiopia.
- Lisa Washington-Sow served as USAID Representative to Mauritania.
- Lorraine Sherman served as USAID Representative to Niger (2017–2019).
- Derrick Brown served as USAID Mission Director in Angola (2016-2018) and Bangladesh (2018).
- Lloyd Jackson served as USAID Representative to Djibouti (2019).
- Zema Semunegus served as US Charge d'Affaires and USAID Mission Director in Timor-Leste from 2021-2023 (Click on: https://web.archive.org/web/20210625033527/https://www.usaid.gov/who-we-are/organization/zema-semunegus). She also served as USAID Mission Director in the Pacific from 2023 - 2025. (https://www.foreignaffairs.gov.fj/fiji-and-united-states-signs-agreement-to-establish-usaid-pacific-office-in-suva/)

== U.S. Department of State ==
This section highlights notable African Americans that have represented the United States abroad at the highest levels with the U.S. Department of State. Many in these leadership positions have also held the title of Ambassador/Chief of Mission and are highlighted chronologically below.

United States Secretary of State and Agency Leadership

To date, there have been two African American Secretaries of State, Colin Powell and Condoleezza Rice, who are highlighted in the "Pioneers" category.

Deputy Secretary of State

- Clifton R. Wharton, Jr. was nominated by President Bill Clinton and confirmed as Deputy Secretary of State from January-November 1993.
- Cheryl D. Mills served as Counselor and Chief of Staff to Secretary of State Hillary Clinton.

Legal Adviser

- Conrad K. Harper served as the 18th Legal Adviser to the Department of State as well as the first African American to be nominated and confirmed to this position 1993-1996.

United States Under Secretaries of State

- Bonnie Jenkins Under Secretary of State for Arms Control and International Security is an expert on arms control and nonproliferation of weapons of mass destruction and currently serves as the Under Secretary of State for Arms Control and International Security Affairs. During the Obama Administration, she was the U.S. Department of State's Coordinator for Threat Reduction Programs in the Bureau of International Security and Nonproliferation.

United States Assistant/Deputy Assistant Secretaries of State

- John Reinhardt joined the Foreign Service in 1957 as an FSO of the U.S. Information Agency, one of the first African Americans to join the diplomatic service in that era. In 1971, Reinhardt was made ambassador to Nigeria, and he subsequently served as Assistant Secretary of State for Public Affairs. In recognition of his distinguished record, President Jimmy Carter made Reinhardt Director of USIA, the first time a career professional had ever ascended to that position.
- Terence Todman is an American diplomat who served as the United States Ambassador to Chad, Guinea, Costa Rica, Spain, Denmark and Argentina. In 1990, he was awarded the rank of Career Ambassador and was as the Assistant Secretary for Inter-American Affairs (Western Hemisphere Affairs) on May 23, 1977.
- George Edward Moose is an American diplomat who was appointed as Assistant Secretary of State for African Affairs on April 1, 1992, and has also served as Ambassador to the UN agencies in Geneva, and Ambassador to the Republics of Benin and Senegal. He is primarily known for serving as Assistant Secretary of State for African Affairs in the Clinton Administration during the genocide in Rwanda.
- Valerie A. Mims served as the first African American Deputy Assistant Secretary of State for Legislative Affairs to the House of Representatives from 1994 to 1997. She subsequently served from 1997-2000 as Senior Advisor to Ambassador George E. Moose covering the United Nations Conference on Trade and Development in Geneva, Switzerland.
- Howard Franklin Jeter served as Deputy Assistant Secretary of State for African Affairs and Director for West African Affairs from 1997 to 1999.
- Constance Berry Newman served as Assistant Secretary of State for African Affairs. Prior to that, she served as Assistant Administrator for Africa of the U.S. Agency for International Development (USAID) from November 2001 to June 2004.
- Jendayi Frazer succeeded Constance Berry Newman as the Assistant Secretary of State for African Affairs in 2005. Frazer was Special Assistant to the President and Senior Director for African Affairs on the National Security Council and the first woman to serve as United States Ambassador to South Africa.
- Johnnie Carson is a career diplomat from the United States who has served as United States Ambassador to several African nations. In 2009 he was nominated to become U.S. Assistant Secretary of State for African Affairs by President Barack Obama.
- Esther Brimmer is an international affairs expert who was nominated as Assistant Secretary of State for International Organization Affairs by United States President Barack Obama on March 11, 2009, and was confirmed by the United States Senate on April 2, 2009.
- Joyce A. Barr, a career diplomat, is the first African American to serve as the Assistant Secretary of State for Administration and was confirmed by the United States Senate in December 2011.
- Susan D. Page served as Deputy Assistant Secretary of State in the Bureau for African Affairs and in 2011 was confirmed by Senate as the first Ambassador to the Republic of South Sudan.
- Cheryl Benton serves as Deputy Assistant Secretary of State in the Bureau for Public Affairs.
- Reuben Brigety served as Deputy Assistant Secretary of State in the Bureau for African Affairs and most recently served a Deputy Assistant Secretary in the Bureau for Population Refugees and Migration, and became a Deputy Assistant Secretary in the African Affairs Bureau in 2011.
- Cynthia Akuetteh served as Deputy Assistant Secretary for African Affairs from 2012 to 2013.
- Raymond Maxwell served as Deputy Assistant Secretary for Near East Affairs from 2011 to 2012.
- Linda Thomas-Greenfield served as the Assistant Secretary of State for African Affairs in the United States Department of State's Bureau of African Affairs from 2013 to 2017.

Among African Americans who served as Executive Directors are: Joyce Barr (East Asia and Pacific Bureau), Suneta Halliburton (Bureau of Economic and Business Affairs/Bureau of Energy Affairs), and Joseph Huggins (Bureau of African Affairs).

== Ambassadors/Chiefs of Mission ==
The following chronological listing highlights Ambassadorial level African American bilateral and multilateral Chiefs of Mission including non-career appointees and Career Foreign and Civil Service Officers throughout history.

- Edward R. Dudley – U.S. Ambassador to Liberia from 1948 to 1953
- Jessie D. Locker – U.S. Ambassador to Liberia from 1953 to 1955
- Richard L. Jones – U.S. Ambassador to Liberia from 1955 to 1959
- John Howard Morrow – U.S. Ambassador to Guinea from 1959 to 1961, and Permanent Representative to UNESCO from 1961 to 1963
- Clifton R. Wharton, Sr. – U.S. Ambassador to Norway from 1961 to 1964
- Mercer Cook – U.S. Ambassador to Niger from 1961 to 1964, and to Senegal and Gambia from 1964 to 1966
- Carl T. Rowan – U.S. Ambassador to Finland from 1963 to 1964
- Clinton E. Knox – U.S. Ambassador to Benin from 1964 to 1969, and to Haiti from 1969 to 1973
- Patricia Roberts Harris – U.S. Ambassador to Luxembourg from 1965 to 1967
- Hugh H. Smythe – U.S. Ambassador to Syria from 1965 to 1967, and to Malta from 1967 to 1969
- Franklin H. Williams – U.S. Ambassador to Ghana from 1965 to 1968
- Elliot P. Skinner – U.S. Ambassador to Burkina Faso from 1966 to 1969
- Samuel C. Adams – U.S. Ambassador to Niger from 1968 to 1969
- Terence A. Todman – U.S. Ambassador to Chad from 1969 to 1972, to Guinea from 1972 to 1975, to Costa Rica from 1974 to 1977, to Spain from 1978 to 1983, to Denmark from 1983 to 1989, and to Argentina from 1989 to 1993
- Samuel Z. Westerfield – U.S. Ambassador to Liberia from 1969 to 1972
- Jerome Heartwell – U.S. Ambassador to Sweden from 1970 to 1972
- Clarence Clyde Ferguson, Jr. – U.S. Ambassador to Uganda from 1970 to 1972
- Charles J. Nelson – U.S. Ambassador to Botswana, Lesotho, and Swaziland, from 1971 to 1974
- John E. Reinhardt – U.S. Ambassador to Nigeria from 1971 to 1975
- W. Beverly Carter – U.S. Ambassador to Tanzania from 1972 to 1975, to Liberia from 1976 to 1979
- O. Rudolph Aggrey – U.S. Ambassador to Senegal and The Gambia from 1973 to 1977, to Romania from 1977 to 1981
- William Bowdoin Jones – Permanent Representative to UNESCO from 1973 to 1977, and to Haiti from 1977 to 1980
- David B. Bolen – U.S. Ambassador to Botswana, Lesotho, and Swaziland from 1974 to 1976, and to East Germany from 1977 to 1980
- Theodore R. Britton, Jr. – U.S. Ambassador to Barbados and Grenada from 1975 to 1977
- Ronald D. Palmer – U.S. Ambassador to Togo from 1976 to 1978, to Malaysia from 1981 to 1983, and to Mauritius from 1986 to 1989
- Charles A. James – U.S. Ambassador to Niger from 1976 to 1979
- Andrew Young – U.S. Ambassador to the United Nations from 1977 to 1979
- Wilbert J. LeMelle – U.S. Ambassador to Kenya and Seychelles from 1977 to 1980
- Ulrich Haynes – U.S. Ambassador to Algeria from 1977 to 1981
- Mabel M. Smythe – U.S. Ambassador to Cameroon from 1977 to 1979, and to Equatorial Guinea from 1979 to 1980
- Richard K. Fox, Jr. – U.S. Ambassador to Trinidad and Tobago from 1977 to 1979
- Maurice D. Bean – U.S. Ambassador to Burma from 1977 to 1979
- Donald F. McHenry – U.S. Ambassador to the United Nations from 1979 to 1981
- Horace G. Dawson – U.S. Ambassador to Botswana from 1979 to 1982
- Anne Forrester – U.S. Ambassador to Mali from 1979 to 1981
- Walter C. Carrington – U.S. Ambassador to Senegal from 1980 to 1981, and to Nigeria from 1993 to 1997
- Barbara M. Watson – U.S. Ambassador to Malaysia from 1980 to 1981
- John A. Burroughs, Jr. – U.S. Ambassador to Malawi from 1981 to 1984, and to Uganda from 1988 to 1991
- Melvin H. Evans – U.S. Ambassador to Trinidad and Tobago from 1981 to 1984
- Gerald E. Thomas – U.S. Ambassador to Guyana from 1981 to 1983, and to Kenya from 1983 to 1989
- Howard K. Walker – U.S. Ambassador to Togo from 1982 to 1984, to Madagascar and Comoros from 1989 to 1992
- Arthur W. Lewis – U.S. Ambassador to Sierra Leone from 1983 to 1986
- George E. Moose – U.S. Ambassador to Benin from 1983 to 1986, to Senegal from 1988 to 1991, and to the European Office of the United Nations in Geneva in 1997; appointed Career Ambassador in 2002
- Edward J. Perkins – U.S. Ambassador to Liberia from 1985 to 1986, to South Africa from 1986 to 1989, to the United Nations from 1992 to 1993, and to Australia from 1993 to 1996
- Irvin Hicks – U.S. Ambassador to Seychelles from 1985 to 1987, and to Ethiopia from 1994 to 1996
- Cynthia Shepard Perry – U.S. Ambassador to Sierra Leone from 1986 to 1989, to Burundi from 1989 to 1993
- Ruth V. Washington – Appointed U.S. Ambassador to the Gambia in 1989
- Johnny Young – U.S. Ambassador to Sierra Leone from 1989 to 1992, to Togo from 1994 to 1997, to Bahrain from 1997 to 2001, and to Slovenia from 2001 to 2004
- Aurelia E. Brazeal – U.S. Ambassador to Micronesia from 1990 to 1993, to Kenya from 1993 to 1996, and to Ethiopia from 2002 to 2005
- Stephen J. Rhodes – U.S. Ambassador to Zimbabwe in 1990
- Arlene Render – U.S. Ambassador to the Gambia from 1990 to 1993, to Zambia from 1996 to 1999, and to U.S. Ambassador to Côte d'Ivoire from 2001 to 2004
- Leonard O. Spearman, Sr. – U.S. Ambassador to Lesotho
- Charles R. Baquet, III – U.S. Ambassador to Djibouti in 1991
- Johnnie Carson – U.S. Ambassador to Uganda from 1991 to 1994, to Zimbabwe from 1995 to 1997, and to Kenya from 1999 to 2003
- Ruth A. Davis – U.S. Ambassador to Benin from 1992 to 1995; appointed Career Ambassador in 2002
- Kenton Wesley Keith – U.S. Ambassador to Qatar from 1992 to 1995
- Joseph Monroe Segars – U.S. Ambassador to Cape Verde from 1992 to 1996
- Leslie M. Alexander – U.S. Ambassador to Mauritius and Comoros from 1993 to 1996, to Ecuador from 1996 to 1999
- Howard F. Jeter – U.S. Ambassador to Botswana from 1993 to 1996, and to Nigeria from 2000 to 2003
- Sidney Williams – U.S. Ambassador to the Bahamas from 1994 to 1998
- Carl B. Stokes – U.S. Ambassador to Seychelles from 1994 to 1995
- J. Gary Cooper – U.S. Ambassador to Jamaica from 1994 to 1997
- Bismarck Myrick – U.S. Ambassador to Lesotho from 1995 to 1998
- Mosina H. Jordan – U.S. Ambassador to the Central African Republic from 1995 to 1997
- James A. Joseph – U.S. Ambassador to South Africa from 1995 to 1999
- John F. Hicks, Sr. – U.S. Ambassador to Eritrea from 1996 to 1997
- Sharon P. Wilkinson – U.S. Ambassador to Burkina Faso from 1996 to 1999, and to U.S. Ambassador to Mozambique from 2000 to 2003
- Shirley E. Barnes – U.S. Ambassador to Madagascar from 1998 to 2001
- William D. Clarke – U.S. Ambassador to Eritrea from 1998 to 2001
- George Williford Boyce Haley – U.S. Ambassador to the Gambia from 1998 to 2001
- Elizabeth McKune – U.S. Ambassador to Qatar from 1998 to 2001
- Robert C. Perry – U.S. Ambassador to the Central African Republic from 1998 to 2001
- George McDade Staples – U.S. Ambassador to Rwanda from 1998 to 2001, and to Cameroon and Equatorial Guinea from 2001 to 2004
- Charles R. Stith – U.S. Ambassador to Tanzania from 1998 to 2001
- Harriet L. Elam-Thomas – U.S. Ambassador to Senegal from 1999 to 2002
- Gregory L. Johnson – U.S. Ambassador to Swaziland from 1999 to 2001
- Delano Eugene Lewis – U.S. Ambassador to South Africa from 1999 to 2001
- Carol Moseley-Braun – U.S. Ambassador to New Zealand and Samoa from 1999 to 2001
- Bismarck Myrick – U.S. Ambassador to Lesotho from 1995 to 1998 and to Liberia from 1999 to 2002
- Sylvia Gaye Stanfield – U.S. Ambassador to Brunei from 1999 to 2002
- Diane E. Watson – U.S. Ambassador to Micronesia, from 1999 to 2002
- Pamela E. Bridgewater – U.S. Ambassador to Benin from 2000 to 2002, to Ghana from 2005 to 2008, and to Jamaica 2010
- Roy L. Austin – U.S. Ambassador to Trinidad and Tobago from 2001 to 2009
- Mattie R. Sharpless – U.S. Ambassador to Central African Republic from 2001 to 2002
- Wanda L. Nesbitt – U.S. Ambassador to Madagascar from 2001 to 2004, to the Ivory Coast from 2007 to 2010, and Namibia 2010
- James David McGee – U.S. Ambassador to Swaziland from 2002 to 2004, to Madagascar from 2004 to 2007, and to Zimbabwe from 2007 to 2009
- Larry L. Palmer – U.S. Ambassador to Honduras from 2002 to 2005, to Barbados 2012
- Richard Lewis Baltimore – U.S. Ambassador to Oman from 2002 to 2006
- Joseph Huggins – U.S. Ambassador to Botswana from 2002 to 2005
- James I. Gadsden – U.S. Ambassador to Iceland from 2002 to 2005
- Robin Renee Sanders – U.S. Ambassador to the Republic of the Congo from 2002 to 2005 and to Nigeria from 2007 to 2010
- Charles Aaron Ray – U.S. Ambassador to Cambodia from 2002 to 2005, and to Zimbabwe from 2009 to 2012
- Gail Denise Mathieu – U.S. Ambassador to Niger from 2002 to 2005 and to Namibia from 2007 to 2010
- Harry K. Thomas, Jr. – U.S. Ambassador to Bangladesh from 2003 to 2005, to the Philippines from 2010 to 2013, and to Zimbabwe 2015
- Roland W. Bullen – U.S. Ambassador to Guyana in 2003
- Margarita Ragsdale – U.S. Ambassador to Djibouti from 2003 to 2006
- June Carter Perry – U.S. Ambassador to Lesotho from 2004 to 2007 and to Sierra Leone from 2007 to 2010
- Joyce A. Barr – U.S. Ambassador to Namibia from 2004 to 2007
- Jendayi E. Frazer – U.S. Ambassador to South Africa from 2004 to 2005
- Roger D. Pierce – U.S. Ambassador to Cape Verde from 2005 to 2007
- Bernadette Allen – U.S. Ambassador to Niger from 2006 to 2010
- Eric M. Bost – U.S. Ambassador to South Africa from 2006 to 2009
- Gayleatha B. Brown – U.S. Ambassador to Benin from 2006 to 2009
- Cindy L. Courville – The first U.S. ambassador to the African Union, from 2006 to 2008
- Clyde Bishop – U.S. Ambassador to the Marshall Islands from 2006 to 2009
- Maurice S. Parker – U.S. Ambassador to Swaziland from 2007 to 2009
- John L. Withers – U.S. Ambassador to Albania from 2007 to 2010
- Eunice S. Reddick – U.S. Ambassador to Gabon from 2007 to 2010, to São Tomé and Príncipe from 2008 to 2010, and to Niger 2014
- Barry L. Wells – U.S. Ambassador to the Gambia from 2007 to 2010
- Marcia S. Bernicat – U.S. Ambassador to Senegal and Guinea-Bissau from 2008 to 2011.
- John Melvin Jones – U.S. Ambassador to Guyana from 2008 to 2010
- Linda Thomas-Greenfield – U.S. Ambassador to Liberia from 2008 to 2012
- C. Steven McGann – U.S. Ambassador to Fiji, Kiribati, Tonga, and Nauru from 2008 to 2011
- Bisa Williams – U.S. Ambassador to Niger from 2010 to 2013
- Nicole Avant – U.S. Ambassador to the Bahamas from 2009 to 2011
- Alfonso Lenhardt – U.S. Ambassador to Tanzania from 2009 to 2013, as well as U.S. representative to the East African Community
- Michael Battle– U.S. Ambassador to the African Union and United Nations Economic Commission for Africa (2009-2013)
- Teddy B. Taylor – U.S. Ambassador to Papua New Guinea, the Solomon Islands, and Vanuatu from 2009 to 2012
- Ertharin Cousin – United States Ambassador to the United Nations Agencies for Food and Agriculture from 2009 to 2012
- Helen Reed-Rowe – The first U.S. Ambassador to Palau
- Sue K. Brown – U.S. Ambassador to Montenegro from 2011 to 2015
- Frankie A. Reed - U.S. Ambassador to Fiji, Kiribati, Nauru, Tonga, and Tuvalu from 2011 - 2015
- Susan D. Page – The U.S. Ambassador to South Sudan
- Gina Abercrombie-Winstanley – U.S. Ambassador to Malta (2012-2016)
- Makila James, U.S. Ambassador to Swaziland from 2012 to 2016
- Tulinabo S. Mushingi, U.S. Ambassador to Senegal (2017-2022), and U.S. Ambassador to Burkina Faso (2013-2016)
- Patrick Gaspard, U.S. Ambassador to South Africa (2013-2016)
- Reuben Brigety, U.S. Ambassador to the African Union and the United Nations Economic Commission for Africa (2013-2015)
- Dwight L. Bush, Sr., U.S. Ambassador to Morocco (2014-2017)
- Crystal Nix-Hines, U.S. Ambassador to UNESCO (2014-2017)
- Brian A. Nichols, U.S. Ambassador to Peru (2014-2017)
- Daniel Yohannes - U.S. Ambassador to the Organization for Economic Cooperation and Development (2014-2017).
- Michael A. Lawson, U.S. Ambassador to the International Civil Aviation Organization 2014
- Cynthia H. Akuetteh, U.S. Ambassador to Gabon and São Tomé and Príncipe (2014-2018)
- Robert A. Wood – U.S. representative to the Conference on Disarmament and U.S. Special Representative for Biological and Toxin Weapons Convention 2014
- Todd D. Robinson, U.S. Ambassador to Guatemala (2014-2017)
- Pamela L. Spratlen – U.S. Ambassador to Kyrgyzstan from 2011 to 2014, and to Uzbekistan (2015-2018)
- S. Fitzgerald Haney - U.S. Ambassador to Costa Rica (2015-2017)
- Marcia Bernicat – U.S. Ambassador to Bangladesh from 2015 to 2018 and Principal Deputy Assistant Secretary in the Bureau of Oceans and International Environmental and Scientific Affairs.
- Dereck Hogan - U.S. Ambassador to Moldova (2018-2021).
- Natalie E. Brown- U.S. Ambassador to Uganda (2020-2023)

=== Ambassadors at Large ===
- W. Beverly Carter – Ambassador at Large for Liaison with State and Local Governments from 1979 to 1981
- Vonya McCann - Ambassador and US Coordinator for Telecommunications (ITU), 1994-1999.
- Suzan Johnson Cook – United States Ambassador-at-Large for International Religious Freedom from 2011 to 2013

== United Nations ==
This section highlights African Americans who have made their mark in the multilateral arena, via the United Nations. Many of the following have held cabinet-level rank as U.S. Ambassador to the United Nations.

- Ralph Bunche, first served in the State Department as Associate Chief of the Division of Dependent Area Affairs, making him the first African American desk officer. He was involved in the formation and administration of the United Nations and also considered instrumental in the creation and adoption of the UN Declaration of Human Rights. In 1950, he was awarded the Nobel Peace Prize for the 1949 Armistice Agreements, which officially ended the 1948 Arab-Israeli Conflict, becoming the first person of color to receive that honor. In 1963, he received the Medal of Freedom from President John F. Kennedy. In 1997, The State Department library was named in his honor.
- Edith S. Sampson is the first African American to officially represent the United States at the UN. She is highlighted in the pioneers section above.
- John Howard Morrow Senior served as alternate delegate to United Nations, 1961; U.S. permanent representative to UNESCO with

personal rank of minister, Paris, France, 1961–63.

- Andrew Young is an American politician, diplomat, activist and pastor from Georgia. He has served as Mayor of Atlanta, a Congressman from the 5th district, and United States Ambassador to the United Nations.
- William Bowdoin Jones was appointed as the U.S. Permanent Representative to the United Nations Educational, Scientific and Cultural Organization on September 1, 1973.
- Donald McHenry is an American former diplomat. He was the United States Ambassador and Permanent Representative to the United Nations from September 1979 until January 20, 1981.
- Edward J. Perkins was appointed as U.S. Permanent Representative to the United Nations on April 6, 1992.
- Betty Eileen King served as the U.S. representative to ECOSOC/UN after being nominated in October 2009.
- Susan Rice is an American foreign policy advisor who was appointed as United States Ambassador to the United Nations in January 2009. Rice served on the staff of the National Security Council and as Assistant Secretary of State for African Affairs during President Bill Clinton's second term.
- Linda Thomas-Greenfield was nominated by President Biden to serve as the US Ambassador to the UN after being confirmed by the United States Senate on February 23, 2021.

== Peace Corps ==
This section highlights African Americans that have held distinguished leadership positions at Peace Corps headquarters, as well those who have directed Peace Corps Field Offices abroad.

- Amb. Del Lewis served as the Peace Corps Director in Nigeria from 1966 -1967, and Uganda from 1967-1969.
- Jacques Wilmore served as the Peace Corps Director in Tanzania from 1979-1984.
- Carolyn R. Payton served as the U.S. Peace Corps Director from 1977 - 1978.
- Yvonne Hubbard served as the U.S. Peace Corps Director in South Africa from 1999 - 2003. She is the First African American and First Female director to serve in South Africa.
- Charles R. Baquet III, nominated and confirmed as the first African American Deputy Director of the Peace Corps from 1993-1999.
- Aaron S. Williams served as the 18th Director of the Peace Corps from 2009 to 2012.

== U.S. Department of Agriculture ==
This section highlights African Americans that held distinguished leadership positions in the Foreign Agricultural Service (FAS), or the Animal Plant and Plant Health Inspection Service (APHIS).

- Cheryle Blakely assumed the role of Deputy Administrator International Services with APHIS in 2018 directing cooperative efforts with foreign governments to prevent the introduction of high-risk pests and diseases into the United States.

== U.S. Department of Commerce ==
This section highlights African Americans that have held distinguished leadership positions in the Foreign Commercial Service.

This section is under construction.

== U.S. African Development Foundation ==
This section highlights African Americans that have held distinguished leadership in the U.S. African Development Foundation.

- CD Glin was sworn in as the U.S. African Development Foundation's 9th President on Tuesday, September 6, 2016 where he served until 2021.
- Travis Adkins was sworn in as USADF's 10th President and CEO, effective January 18, 2022.

== U.S. Congress ==
This section highlights African Americans that have provided leadership and served with distinction formulating policy that influenced Foreign Affairs on Capitol Hill and across the globe.

- Charles Coles Diggs, Jr was an African American politician from the U.S. state of Michigan. Diggs was an early member of the civil rights movement, having been present at the murder trial of Emmett Till and elected the first chairman of the Congressional Black Caucus (1969–71). He was appointed to the post of Chairman of the Subcommittee on Africa of the Committee on Foreign Affairs in 1969.
- Ronald Vernie "Ron" Dellums From 1971 to 1998, he was elected to thirteen terms as a Member of the U.S. House of Representatives from Northern California's 9th Congressional District, after which he worked as a lobbyist in Washington D.C. When President Ronald Reagan vetoed Dellums' Comprehensive Anti-Apartheid Act of 1986, a Democratic-controlled House and a Republican-controlled Senate overrode Reagan's veto, the first override of a presidential foreign policy veto in the 20th century.
- George Thomas "Mickey" Leland was an anti-poverty activist who later became a congressman from the Texas 18th District and chair of the Congressional Black Caucus. In 1984 Leland established the congressional select committee on Hunger and initiated a number of programs designed to assuage the famine crises that plagued Ethiopia and Sudan through much of the 1980s.
- Rep. Donald M. Payne Payne is a member of the U.S. House Committee on Foreign Affairs, where he serves as Ranking Member (formerly Chairman) of the United States House Foreign Affairs Subcommittee on Africa and Global Health and as a member of the Subcommittee on the United States House Foreign Affairs Subcommittee on the Western Hemisphere and the United States House Foreign Affairs Subcommittee on International Organizations, Human Rights, and Oversight. Congressman Payne has been at the forefront of efforts to restore democracy and human rights in nations throughout the globe.
- Gregory Meeks is the U.S. representative for New York's 6th congressional district, serving since 1998. He currently sits on the Committee on Foreign Affairs including the Subcommittee on Asia and the Pacific, and is the Ranking Member of the Subcommittee on Europe and Eurasia.
- Karen Bass is the U.S. representative for California's 33rd congressional district. Representative Bass serves in the Committee on Foreign Affairs on the Subcommittee for Africa, Global Health, and Human Rights and Oversight and Investigation.
- Frederica Wilson is the U.S. representative for Florida's 17th congressional district. She serves on the Committee on Foreign Affairs and the Subcommittee for Asia and the Pacific.

The Congressional Black Caucus Foundation

- Founded in 1976 and based in Washington, D.C., CBCF envisions a world in which the black community is free of all disparities and able to contribute fully to advancing the common good. Its mission is to advance the global black community by developing leaders, informing policy and educating the public. Though primarily domestically focused, the CBCF has expanded its vision internationally. As citizens have become more global in their everyday lives, CBCF has aligned itself with international concerns and opportunities for African Americans and minorities globally. The CBCF works with African nations in an effort to look at the intersection of African Americans and Africans as we journey through the challenges and opportunities in health, education, and economic empowerment.

== Advocacy groups and NGOs founded by African Americans ==
This section highlights NGOs, foundations, and other advocacy groups that were founded by African Americans in the international realm.

TransAfrica Forum The idea of foreign policy advocacy organizations stems from the Black Leadership Conference convened by the Congressional Black Caucus in September 1976. The conference concluded that the absence of African Americans in high-level international affairs positions, and the general neglect of African and Caribbean priorities, could only be corrected by the establishment of a private advocacy organization. An ad hoc committee consisting of Randall Robinson, Herschelle Challenor, and Willard Johnson formulated an organization design. On July 1, 1977, TransAfrica a nonprofit organization was incorporated in Washington, D.C., with Randall Robinson as executive director. The primary human rights issue of the day was the unjust apartheid regime in South Africa. TransAfrica's activism, legislative campaigns and strategic media work, coupled with a global solidarity movement, hastened the end of apartheid.

Africa Action Its parent organizations date back to 1953, when the American Committee on Africa (ACOA) was founded in New York. It was created by a group of African American and Caucasian civil rights activists who had organized support for the historic Defiance Campaign in South Africa the previous year. ACOA, together with The Africa Fund, which was founded in 1966, provided key support for independence movements throughout Africa. The Africa Policy Information Center (APIC) was founded in Washington, D.C., in 1978. It pioneered the use of new information and communication technology to support advocacy work on Africa.

With the merger of these three organizations in 2001, their complementary strengths became a solid framework to organize activism for Africa in the decades ahead.

The Africa Society The Africa Society is a national nonprofit, nonpartisan and diverse organization formed as a direct outgrowth of the National Summit on Africa, which launched in 1997 with grant support from the Ford Foundation and the Carnegie Corporation of New York. This initiative resulted in the largest mobilization of Africa-interested individuals in the history of the U.S., with delegations from every state and territory. After contemplating how best to meet the needs and demands of nearly 20,000 constituents, the Summit's Board of Directors and Secretariat voted to establish an organization devoted to educating Americans of all backgrounds, ages and statuses about the continent of Africa. To meet this goal, The Africa Society was launched in January 2002 at an event sponsored by one of its primary partners, Discovery Communications, LLC. Since, the Society has developed a wide range of educational programs targeting every age group and academic level.

Constituency for Africa The Constituency for Africa (CFA) was founded in 1990, when a group of concerned Africanists, interested citizens and Africa-focused organizations developed a strategy to build organized support for Africa in the United States. CFA was charged with educating the U.S. public about Africa and U.S. policy on Africa; mobilizing an activist constituency for Africa; and fostering cooperation among a broad-based coalition of American, African and international organizations, and individuals committed to the progress and empowerment of Africa and African people.

International Foundation for Education Self-Help (IFESH) IFESH was founded by Reverend Leon H. Sullivan, recipient of the Presidential Medal of Freedom and Eleanor Roosevelt Humanitarian Award. In establishing IFESH in 1981, Reverend Sullivan set out to assist African nations in their efforts to eradicate poverty, disease and inequity through self-help partnership programs, which continues to be its mission.

Africare Founded by Africans and Americans amidst the Sahelian drought of the early 1970s, Africare has grown to become a leader in aid to Africa ― pioneering various types of self-help development programs and noted for its close, collegial partnerships with the people and leaders of Africa. Africare is also the oldest and largest African American led organization in the field.

Opportunities Industrialization Centers International Founded by Reverend Dr. Leon H. Sullivan in 1970, Opportunities Industrialization Centers International, or OIC International, was created in response to requests for Reverend Sullivan's assistance from local citizen groups in Nigeria, Ghana and Ethiopia. Working towards Reverend Sullivan's vision of self-help and self-reliance, OIC International's affiliate network has spread around the globe, establishing community-based, affiliate organizations in over twenty countries over a span of four decades.

United Negro College Fund Special Programs Corporation, UNCFSP (IIPP) Emerging from the United Negro College Fund (UNCF), the United Negro College Fund Special Programs Corporation (UNCFSP) works to create connections between private industry, government and talented minority students. UNCFSP has built an extensive partnership network consisting of hundreds of domestic and international universities, federal agencies, international governments, non-governmental organizations, and the private sector. They seek to provide minority institutions with the ability to identify, qualify, and capture government opportunities. Through these opportunities and with strategic partnerships, minority institutions can produce cutting-edge concepts and develop research to solve the nation's most pressing concerns.

The Links Incorporated Founded in 1946, it is one of the nation's oldest and largest volunteer service organizations of extraordinary women who are committed to enriching, sustaining, and ensuring the culture and economic survival of African Americans and other persons of African ancestry. The recipient of awards from the UN and the Leon H Sullivan Foundation for its programs, The Links' programs include services in education, health, culture, community development, and youth and female empowerment.

Leadership Africa was incorporated in 2006. They to tackle the challenges of African youth. Leadership Africa partners with African organizations and government institutions to implement youth leadership programs that emphasize sustainable peace and development. Their mission is to empower African youth, especially girls, and to help them to emerge as Africa's leaders of change and transformation.

Adventures in Health, Education and Agriculture in Development (AHEAD) addresses the healthcare needs of children and families in Tanzania, East Africa, the Gambia, and West Africa. Their programs are adapted to help Africans be self-sustaining in addressing their own healthcare needs. AHEAD's mission is to improve the quality of life by implementing programs that lead to self-reliance.

The Rainbow PUSH Coalition The Rainbow PUSH Coalition (RPC) is a multi-racial, multi-issue, progressive, international membership organization fighting for social change. Founded by Reverend Jesse L. Jackson in 1996, RPC works to make the American Dream a reality for all citizens and advocate for peace and justice around the world. RPC is dedicated to improving the lives of all people and serving as a voice for the voiceless. Rainbow PUSH's mission is to protect, defend, and gain civil rights by leveling the economic and educational playing fields, and to promote peace and justice around the world. RPC's headquarters is in Chicago and has offices in Washington, D.C., Atlanta, Detroit, Houston, Los Angeles, New York, and Oakland.

Americans, Chinese and Africans Connecting Founded by Sharon T. Freeman, Americans, Chinese and Africans Connecting (ACAC) seeks to facilitate relationships among Black and African-owned firms and Chinese firms to help them make more money. ACAC also aims to fill the information gap that limits the ability of Black and African-owned firms to succeed in relationships with Chinese firms. ACAC offers a range of business services that help clarify how to do business in each other's environment. ACAC provides background checks, identifies business opportunities, provides information and technical assistance helps member firms access tools and resources to consummate their business deals, and hosts workshops and other learning opportunities.

== Foreign Service Officer Workforce ==
This section provides a brief snapshot of publicly available workforce statistics for U.S. Foreign Service Officers at the Department of State and USAID.

In 2019, African Americans represented 5.3% of the Department of State Foreign Service Generalists, and 8.8% of Foreign Service Specialists.

In 2016, African Americans represented 5.36% of the Department of State Foreign Service Generalists, and 8.89% of Foreign Service Specialists.

In 2016, the USAID Foreign Service reported 11% of its Foreign Service workforce as African American.

In 2008, African Americans represented 5.6% of the approximately 11,471 members of the U.S. Foreign Service. This percentage falls short of the number of African Americans in the civilian workforce and the general population but represents, over time, efforts to promote diversity through senior-level appointments and recruitment into the career Foreign Service.
