= Harvey Frans Nelson Jr. =

American diplomat (1924–2021)

Harvey Frans Nelson Jr. (January 26, 1924 – May 4, 2021) was an American diplomat who served as United States Ambassador to Swaziland from 1985 to 1988.

Nelson was born in January 1924 in Long Beach, California, the grandson of Nebraska Senator George William Norris. He served on active duty in the U.S. Navy from 1942 to 1946. He graduated from Occidental College with a B.A. in 1947 and from Fletcher School of Law and Diplomacy with an M.A. in 1950.

Prior to entering government service, Nelson was a political science instructor at Bowdoin College in Brunswick, Maine from 1950 to 1951. Nelson entered the Foreign Service in 1951. From 1952 to 1953 he served as consular officer at the U.S. Embassy in Copenhagen, Denmark, to be followed as political officer from 1953 to 1955. He returned to the department as a political analyst in the Office of Intelligence Research from 1955 to 1957 and then took Finnish language training at the Foreign Service Institute. Mr. Nelson studied East European studies at the Indiana University from 1957 to 1958. He became desk officer in the Office of Scandinavian Affairs in the department from 1958 to 1960. He then went to the U.S. Embassy in Helsinki as political officer, where he served until 1965. This was followed by French language training at the Foreign Service Institute. From there he became political officer at the U.S. Embassy in Kinshasa, Zaire. From 1967 to 1969 he was deputy chief of mission at the U.S. Embassy in Libreville, Gabon. Returning to the department in 1969, he became deputy chief in the Office of Southern African Affairs. In 1971 he attended the Senior Seminar in Foreign Policy at the Foreign Service Institute. From 1972 to 1975 he was deputy chief of mission at the U.S. Embassy in Lusaka, Zambia. In 1975 he was an adviser on Africa at the United States Mission to the United Nations in New York. In 1976 he served as a legislative management officer in the Office of Congressional Relations. From there, in 1976 he became deputy chief of mission at the U.S. Embassy in Pretoria, South Africa. From 1979 to 1980 he was a diplomat-in-residence at Arizona State University in Tempe, AZ, and from 1980 to 1984 he was deputy commandant for international affairs at the U.S. Army War College in Carlisle, Pennsylvania.

On July 11, 1985, President Ronald Reagan announced his intention to nominate Nelson, a member of the Senior Foreign Service, to be Ambassador of the United States of America to the Kingdom of Swaziland. Nelson succeeded Robert H. Phinny on August 1.

Nelson spoke French, Swedish, and Danish, and had four children. He died in Ashburn, Virginia, in May 2021 at the age of 97.

Diplomatic posts
Preceded by Robert H. Phinny	United States Ambassador to Swaziland; 1985–1988	Succeeded by Mary A. Ryan
