= Phinny =

Phinny may refer to:

- Phinny, a main character from the children's TV series Pupstruction
- Robert H. Phinny
- Ryan Phinny
