= Mary A. Ryan =

American diplomat

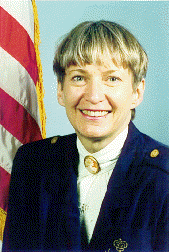
- Born: October 1, 1940; New York City, U.S.
- Died: April 25, 2006 (aged 65)
- Education: St. John's University
- Occupation: Diplomat

Mary A. Ryan

11th Assistant Secretary of State for Consular Affairs
- In office May 12, 1993 – September 30, 2002
- Preceded by: Elizabeth M. Tamposi
- Succeeded by: Maura Harty

Mary A. Ryan (1940–2006) was a United States career diplomat who served as United States Ambassador to Swaziland from 1988 to 1990 and as Assistant Secretary of State for Consular Affairs from 1993 to 2002. Ryan also served overseas in Italy, Honduras, Mexico, Côte d'Ivoire, and Sudan.

== Biography ==
Mary A. Ryan was born in New York City on October 1, 1940. She was educated at St. John's University, receiving a Bachelor of Arts degree in 1963 and a Master of Arts degree in 1965.

Ryan joined the United States Foreign Service in 1966. Her first assignment was as a consular and administrative officer in Naples, a position she held from 1966 to 1969. Ryan then was assigned as personnel officer at the American Embassy in Tegucigalpa from 1970 to 1971. Ryan subsequently served as a consular officer at the American consulate general in Monterrey.

In 1973, Ryan was assigned as administrative officer in the Bureau of African Affairs in Washington, D.C., from 1973 to 1975, and she served as a post management officer in the Bureau of African Affairs from 1975 to 1977. For the next three years, Ryan worked as a career development officer in the Bureau of Personnel.

In 1980, Ryan received French language training, followed by assignments as administrative counselor in Abidjan from 1980 to 1981, and Khartoum from 1981 to 1982.

From 1982 to 1983, Ryan served as an inspector in the Office of the Inspector General in the Department of State. She was the executive director of the Bureau of European and Canadian Affairs from 1983 to 1985. In 1985, she became the Executive Assistant to the Under Secretary of State for Management Ronald I. Spiers.

On April 21, 1988, President of the United States Ronald Reagan nominated Ryan as United States Ambassador to Swaziland; she subsequently presented her credentials on August 25, 1988, and she left her post on January 24, 1990.

Returning to Washington, D.C., in 1990, Ambassador Ryan served as Principal Deputy Assistant Secretary in the Bureau of Consular Affairs. Assigned as Director of the Kuwait Task Force following the Iraqi invasion of Kuwait, she served in this capacity until her assignment to the United Nations Special Commission on the Elimination of Iraqi Weapons of Mass Destruction as the Commission's first Director of Operations. She returned from New York to take up her duties as Deputy Assistant Secretary of State for European and Canadian Affairs.

In 1992 and 1998, Ryan received the Presidential Distinguished Service Award, and she received the U.S. Department of State's Arnold L. Raphel Award for mentoring in 1996.

In 1993, President Bill Clinton nominated Ryan as Assistant Secretary of State for Consular Affairs, and she began this position on May 12, 1993, overseeing the creation of the Office of Children's Issues in 1994. In 1994, Ryan testified at a congressional hearing, advocating against a proposed provision to declare all members of Hamas as terrorists and prohibiting them from entering the United States. Ryan said that all Hamas members are not considered terrorists because Hamas performs some social welfare activities, such as giving economic, educational, and medical assistance to Palestinians.

Ryan served as Assistant Secretary of State for Consular Affairs at the time of the September 11 attacks, and she testified to Congress regarding how the terrorists received U.S. visas and what should be done to prevent terrorists from receiving U.S. visas in the future. Ryan testified that, during 2001, each consular officer stationed Saudi Arabia interviewed 200 people per day. Ryan said that consular officers did not review an applicants' local criminal record because they were so unreliable; in many countries, a person could bribe local police departments to delete their criminal history. Ryan testified that it was unlikely that a consular officer would detect a terrorist during a visa interview. Ryan said that visa applications ask whether the applicant belongs to a terrorist organization, and applicants always say no. Ryan told Congress that consular officers were not given the intelligence necessary in order to detect and reject visa applicants suspected of committing terrorism. Ryan said that the Federal Bureau of Investigation refused to share this intelligence information with consular officers. Ryan said that it was up to the U.S. intelligence community to detect people at risk of committing terrorism before they apply for visas and then give the list of names to visa officers so that they can then refuse their visa applications. Despite terrorist leader Mohamed Atta having met with Osama bin Laden in 2000, Ryan said that the intelligence community had not informed Consular Affairs that Atta was a terrorist and that visa officers had no way of knowing that Atta was a terrorist. At a congressional hearing, Ryan testified, "It's the failure of intelligence rather than a failure of the visa system. If we had the information, we would not have issued visas to these people.... It is a lack of information-sharing, a lack of intelligence, that we have to fix." Ryan's post as Assistant Secretary of State for Consular Affairs ended on September 30, 2002. The U.S. Department of State said it was part of a normal rotation for a staff member after a change in presidential administration.

After retiring, Ryan volunteered as an Eucharistic minister for patients at George Washington University Hospital, she was an extraordinary minister of the Eucharist at Saint Stephen Martyr Catholic Church, she completed a two-year program in parish administration at Trinity University, and she was a volunteer tutor for students in Washington, D.C.

Ryan died on April 25, 2006, of myelofibrosis.

== See also ==
- Visa Express
- Office of Children's Issues

Diplomatic posts
Preceded by Harvey Frans Nelson, Jr.	United States Ambassador to Swaziland; August 25, 1988 – January 24, 1990	Succeeded by Stephen H. Rogers
Government offices
Preceded by Elizabeth M. Tamposi	Assistant Secretary of State for Consular Affairs; May 12, 1993 – September 30, 2002	Succeeded by Maura Harty
