= List of ambassadors of the United States to Eswatini =

Ambassador of the United States to Eswatini
- Seal of the United States Department of State

- Flag of a United States ambassador

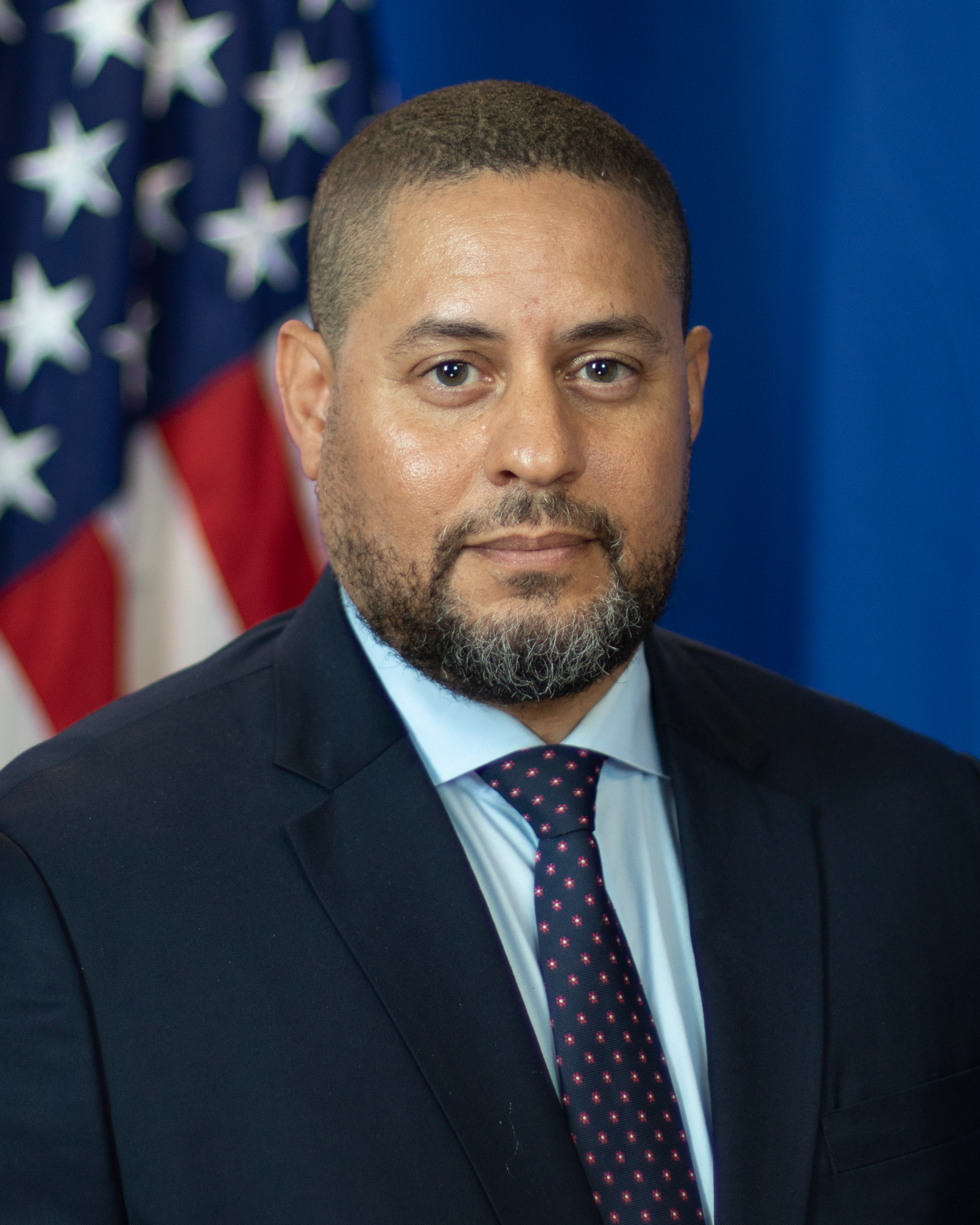
- Incumbent; Marc Weinstock; Chargé d'Affairs ad interim since August 13, 2025
- Inaugural holder: Charles J. Nelson as Ambassador Extraordinary and Plenipotentiary
- Formation: June 9, 1971
- Website: U.S. Embassy - Mbabane

This is a list of ambassadors of the United States to Eswatini (formerly Swaziland).

By direction of King Mswati III, the English language form of his country's name was changed from Swaziland to Eswatini in 2018. Diplomatic missions were officially notified of this new name on May 18, 2018, and the U.S. Board on Geographic Names approved the new country name "Eswatini" (short-form) or "Kingdom of Eswatini" (long-form) on May 25, 2018 for U.S. government communications and documentation.

After the Second Boer War of 1899–1902, Swaziland became a British protectorate and thus came under the hegemony of the British Empire. In the early years of colonial rule, the British had expected that Swaziland would eventually be incorporated into South Africa. After World War II, however, South Africa’s racial policies induced the United Kingdom to prepare Swaziland for independence. In 1966, the UK Government agreed to discuss a new constitution, and Swaziland became independent on September 6, 1968.

The United States immediately recognized the new nation and established an embassy in the capital Mbabane on September 6, 1968, independence day for Swaziland. Chris C. Pappas, Jr., was appointed as chargé d'affaires ad interim pending the appointment of an ambassador. The first ambassador, Charles J. Nelson was appointed on June 9, 1971. He was accredited to Swaziland, Lesotho, and Botswana while resident in Gaborone, Botswana.

== Ambassadors ==
- Note: Chris C. Pappas, Jr. served as chargé d'affaires September 1968–April 1969. Robert W. Chase served in that capacity, April 1969–August 1971.

Name	Title	Appointed	Presented credentials	Terminated mission	Notes
Charles J. Nelson – Political appointee	Ambassador Extraordinary and Plenipotentiary	June 9, 1971	November 3, 1971	March 2, 1974	One ambassador, resident at Gaborone, was accredited to Botswana, Swaziland, and Lesotho.
David B. Bolen – Career FSO	Ambassador Extraordinary and Plenipotentiary	February 28, 1974	April 22, 1974	August 11, 1976	One ambassador, resident at Gaborone, was accredited to Botswana, Swaziland, and Lesotho.
Donald R. Norland – Career FSO	Ambassador Extraordinary and Plenipotentiary	November 17, 1976	February 23, 1978	September 8, 1979	In 1979 the first ambassador was appointed solely for Swaziland.
Richard Cavins Matheron – Career FSO	Ambassador Extraordinary and Plenipotentiary	November 27, 1979	March 11, 1980	May 26, 1982	
Robert H. Phinny – Political appointee	Ambassador Extraordinary and Plenipotentiary	August 17, 1982	January 12, 1983	September 5, 1984	
Harvey Frans Nelson, Jr. – Career FSO	Ambassador Extraordinary and Plenipotentiary	August 1, 1985	October 14, 1985	July 29, 1988	
Mary A. Ryan – Career FSO	Ambassador Extraordinary and Plenipotentiary	July 11, 1988	August 25, 1988	January 24, 1990	
Stephen H. Rogers – Career FSO	Ambassador Extraordinary and Plenipotentiary	October 22, 1990	November 15, 1990	November 19, 1993	
John T. Sprott – Career FSO	Ambassador Extraordinary and Plenipotentiary	August 9, 1993	February 17, 1994	August 1, 1996	
Alan R. McKee – Career FSO	Ambassador Extraordinary and Plenipotentiary	July 2, 1996	October 11, 1996	July 12, 1999	
Gregory Lee Johnson – Career FSO	Ambassador Extraordinary and Plenipotentiary	November 16, 1999	February 3, 2000	October 18, 2001	
James D. McGee – Career FSO	Ambassador Extraordinary and Plenipotentiary	January 30, 2002	February 21, 2002	August 10, 2004	
Lewis W. Lucke – Career FSO	Ambassador Extraordinary and Plenipotentiary	July 2, 2004	August 26, 2004	July 22, 2006	
Maurice S. Parker – Career FSO	Ambassador Extraordinary and Plenipotentiary	July 20, 2007	September 21, 2007	June 12, 2009	
Earl M. Irving – Career FSO	Ambassador Extraordinary and Plenipotentiary	July 31, 2009	August 27, 2009	August 27, 2012	
Makila James - Career FSO	Ambassador Extraordinary and Plenipotentiary	August 27, 2012	September 20, 2012	February 5, 2016	
Lisa J. Peterson - Career FSO	Ambassador Extraordinary and Plenipotentiary	November 19, 2015	February 5, 2016	December 1, 2020	
Jeanne Maloney - Career FSO	Ambassador Extraordinary and Plenipotentiary	December 9, 2020	March 4, 2021	December 20, 2022	
Caitlin Piper - Career FSO	Chargé d'Affairs ad interim	December 20, 2022		January 26, 2023	
Earl R. Miller – Career FSO	Chargé d'Affairs ad interim	January 27, 2023		October 27, 2023	
Caitlin Piper - Career FSO	Chargé d'Affairs ad interim	October 27, 2023		August 12, 2025	
Marc Weinstock - Career FSO	Chargé d'Affairs ad interim	August 13, 2025		Incumbent	

== See also ==
- Eswatini–United States relations
- Foreign relations of Eswatini
- Ambassadors of the United States
