= Maurice S. Parker =

American diplomat and foreign service officer

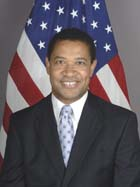
Maurice S. Parker. U.S. State Department photo

Maurice Stephen Parker (born 1949) is a United States diplomat and career foreign service officer of the State Department. From 2007 to 2009, he served as the United States Ambassador to Swaziland. President Bush nominated him as ambassador on April 30, 2007. He took the oath of office on July 20, 2007, and presented his credentials to the government of Swaziland in September 2007.

Parker received his bachelor's degree from the University of California at Berkeley and his master's degree from San Francisco State University.

He is a career member of the Senior Foreign Service, with the class of Minister-Counselor. Prior to his posting in Mbabane, he was Director of the Office of Employee Relations and Foreign Service Assignments in the Bureau of Human Resources. He was also Director of Consular and International Programs at the Homeland Security Council at the White House and Principal Officer at the consulates in Ciudad Juárez and Barcelona. His other overseas assignments have included Nigeria, Scotland, Colombia and Guyana.

== Bibliography ==
- United States Department of State: Biography of Maurice S. Parker
- United States Embassy in Mbabane: Biography of the Ambassador
- Presidential Nomination: Maurice Stephen Parker

Diplomatic posts
Preceded by Lewis W. Lucke	United States Ambassador to Swaziland; 2007–2009	Succeeded by Earl M. Irving
