= Makila James =

American diplomat

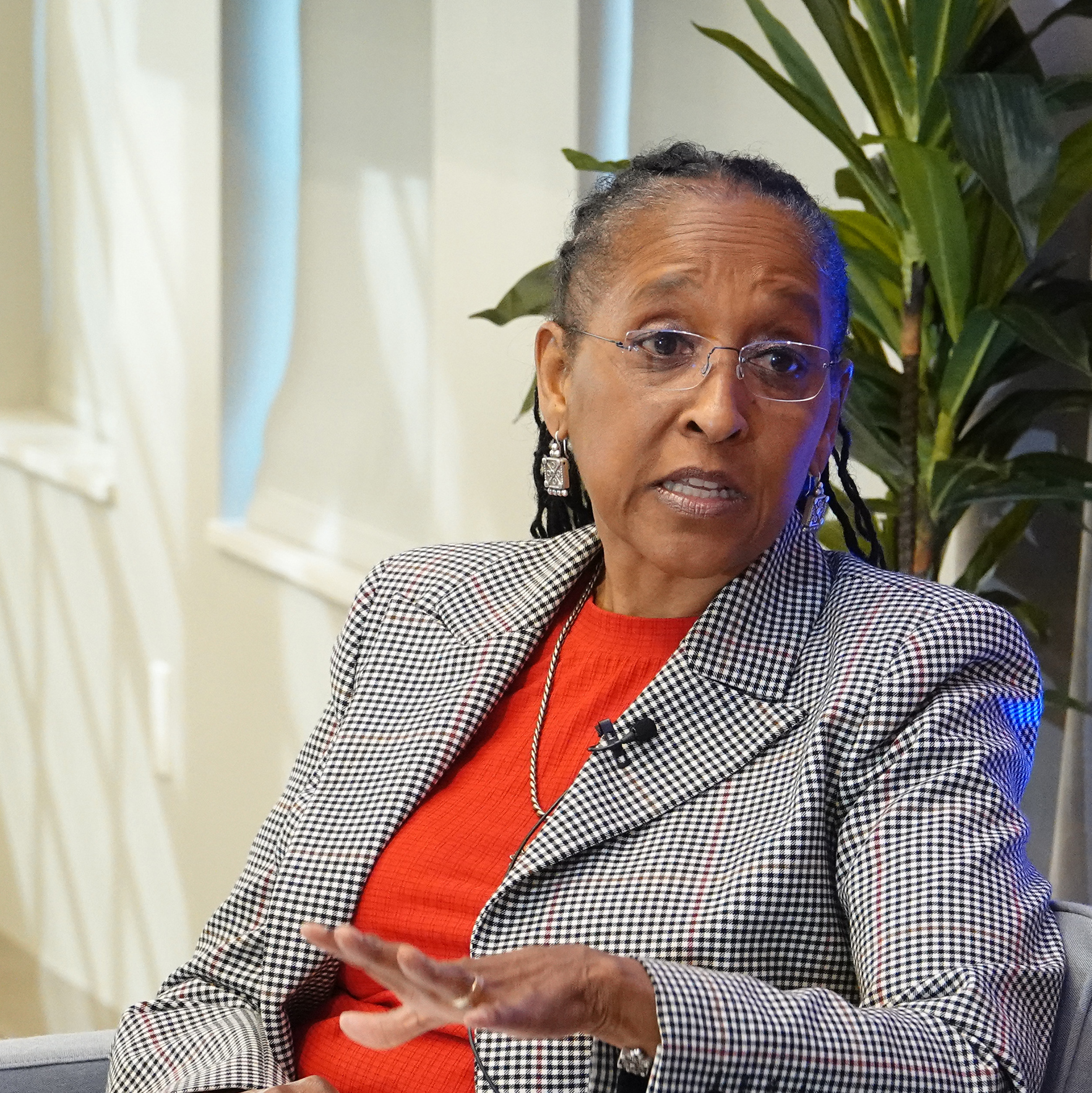
- in 2022

United States Ambassador to Swaziland
- In office August 27, 2012 – February 5, 2016
- President: Barack Obama
- Preceded by: Earl M. Irving
- Succeeded by: Lisa J. Peterson

Deputy Assistant Secretary for East Africa and the Sudans
- In office September 2018 – 2020

Personal details
- Born: July 1957 (age 69)
- Spouse: Louis Wells
- Children: 1
- Profession: Foreign service officer

Makila James (born July 1957) is an American diplomat who has been a career Foreign Service Officer within the U.S. State Department. Beginning in 1988, she has had a series of postings and roles related to the Caribbean and Africa, leading to her being the Director of the Office of Caribbean Affairs from 2009 to 2012. She then served as the United States Ambassador to Swaziland from 2012 to 2016. Later, she was Deputy Assistant Secretary for East Africa and the Sudans from 2018 to 2020.

== Early life ==
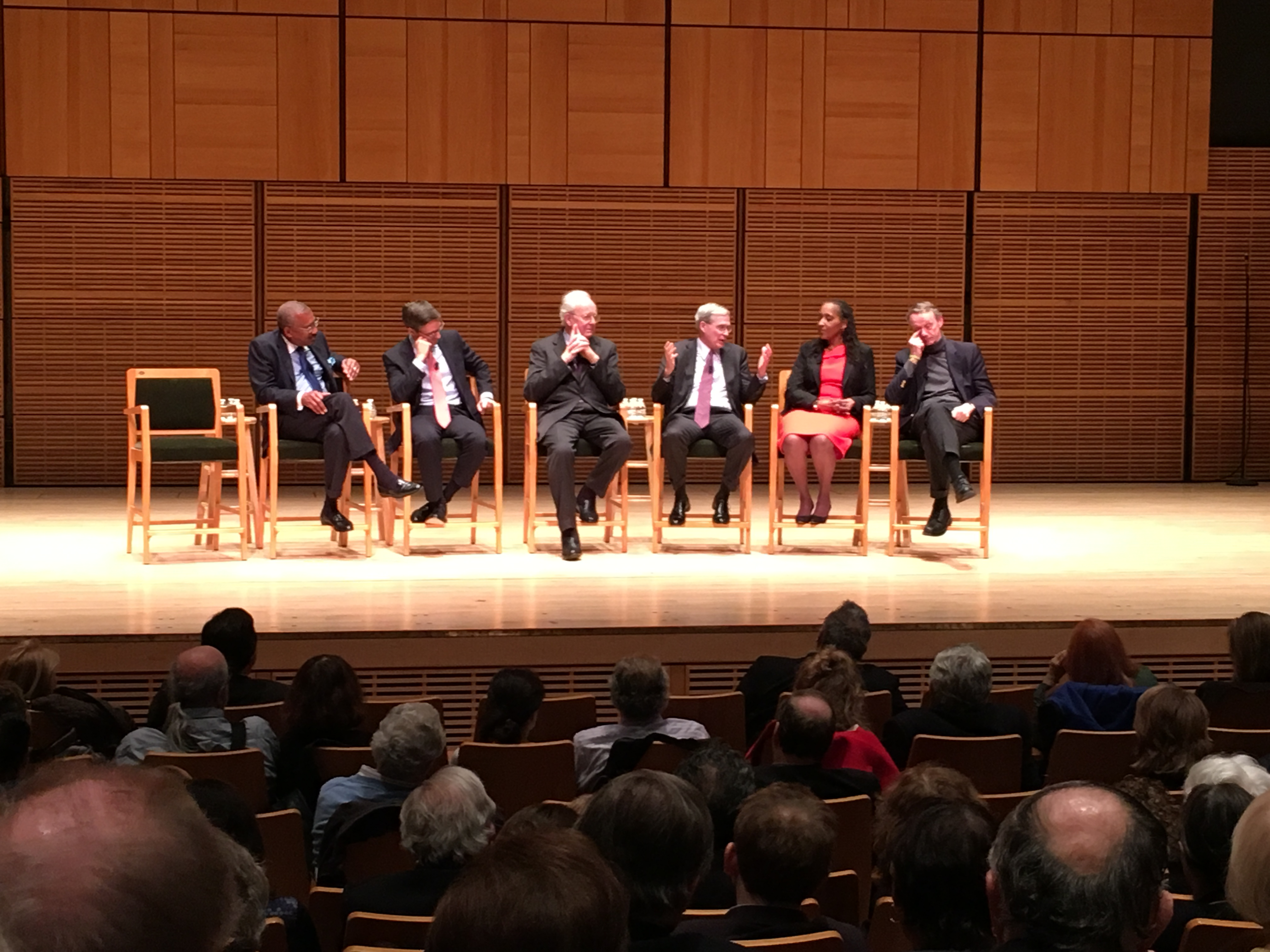
James (second from right) at a 2016 panel session discussing the influence of Cornell University on American foreign policy

James was born in July 1957 in New York to parents Albert and Eddie Mae James, who had nine other children.

She attended Cornell University, where she graduated with a bachelor's degree with a double major Africana Studies and American History in 1979. There she was one of a relatively few African-American members of the Quill and Dagger society. She has said that her dual study program and her involvement at the Cornell Africana Studies and Research Center had a strong impact on the direction her career took, that from the beginning of her time at Cornell she wanted to be "a woman in front of the train," and that she finds it encouraging that the Africana program was still going strong.

She then attended Columbia University Law School, where she gained a J.D. in 1982.

James married Louis Wells and the couple have one child.

== Foreign service career ==
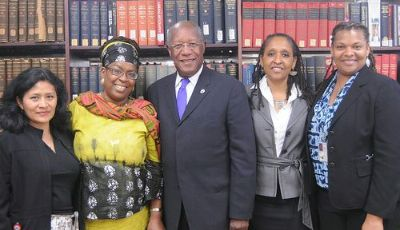
As Director of the Office of Caribbean Affairs, James (second from right) hosted a 2011 event for the International Year for People of African Descent/Caribbean–American Heritage.

Makila James became a career Foreign Service Officer within the State Department, starting in 1988. Her positions have generally been with the Bureau of Western Hemisphere Affairs and the Bureau of African Affairs. Her first overseas assignments included being a consular officer in Jamaica, a political/economics officer in Nigeria, and a political officer in Zimbabwe. She served as the desk officer in the Office of West African Affairs, international relations officer in the Office of International Organization Affairs, and watch officer at the Operations Center.

From early experiences on the continent, including monitoring elections in Nigeria, James wrote in a letter to the editor of The Washington Post in 1995: "Africa is no easy place to love or know. But if you love her, you will come to know her: The opportunity to understand the human spirit's dogged determination to survive and be free is everywhere evident in Africa."

During 2002–2003, James was a research fellow at the Institute for the Study of Diplomacy within the Edmund A. Walsh School of Foreign Service at Georgetown University. In 2010 she earned a master's degree in National Security from National Defense University.

She was a member of the State Department's Policy Planning Staff from 2003 to 2006. From 2006 to 2007, James was the principal officer of the consulate general in Juba in South Sudan. From 2007 to 2009, she was the Deputy Director of the Office of Southern African Affairs. Following that, she was the Director of the Office of Caribbean Affairs until 2012.

== U.S. Ambassador to Swaziland ==
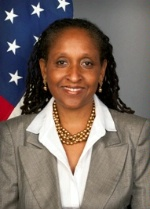
Official photo as ambassador, c. 2012

Ambassador James at work in the U.S. Embassy in Swaziland, 2014

James was nominated for the position of United States Ambassador to Swaziland on February 17, 2012, by President Barack Obama. She appeared before the Senate Foreign Relations Committee on March 22, 2012.

She was confirmed by the full United States Senate on July 31, 2011, and sworn in as the United States Ambassador to the Kingdom of Swaziland on August 27, 2012. Ambassador James presented her credentials at post on September 20, 2012.

One of James' major initiatives was furthering the protection of Swazi women and adolescent girls, especially in the context of the country's endemic HIV/AIDS problems. Many of these efforts were done in conjunction improving maternal health care and other services as part of the President's Emergency Plan for AIDS Relief (PEPFAR).

In 2014, the case of human rights lawyer Thulani Maseko and journalist Bheki Makhubu being imprisoned attracted attention to Swaziland's lack of political freedoms. Ambassador James attended sessions of the High Court of Swaziland that pertained to the two and she stated that, "We are here in solidarity and to give moral support [to them]." She added, "This case compels all of us to consider what are the consequences for Swaziland, or any country, if no one is allowed to question the actions of the judiciary? What other mechanism exists to keep its power in check?" Her actions and statements were viewed by a government-controlled Swazi media outlet as a violation of diplomatic protocol as established by the 1961 Vienna Convention on Diplomatic Relations. However no formal complaint against her was filed by the Swazi government and the State Department did not disavow her actions.

Obama nominated a successor to James, Lisa J. Peterson, in September 2015. James' tenure as ambassador ended in early 2016.

== Academic roles ==
In January 2016, James joined the faculty of the National War College as an assistant professor. James stayed in that position through 2018. She was also briefly a director of an office at the National Defense University.

== Deputy Assistant Secretary for East Africa and the Sudans ==
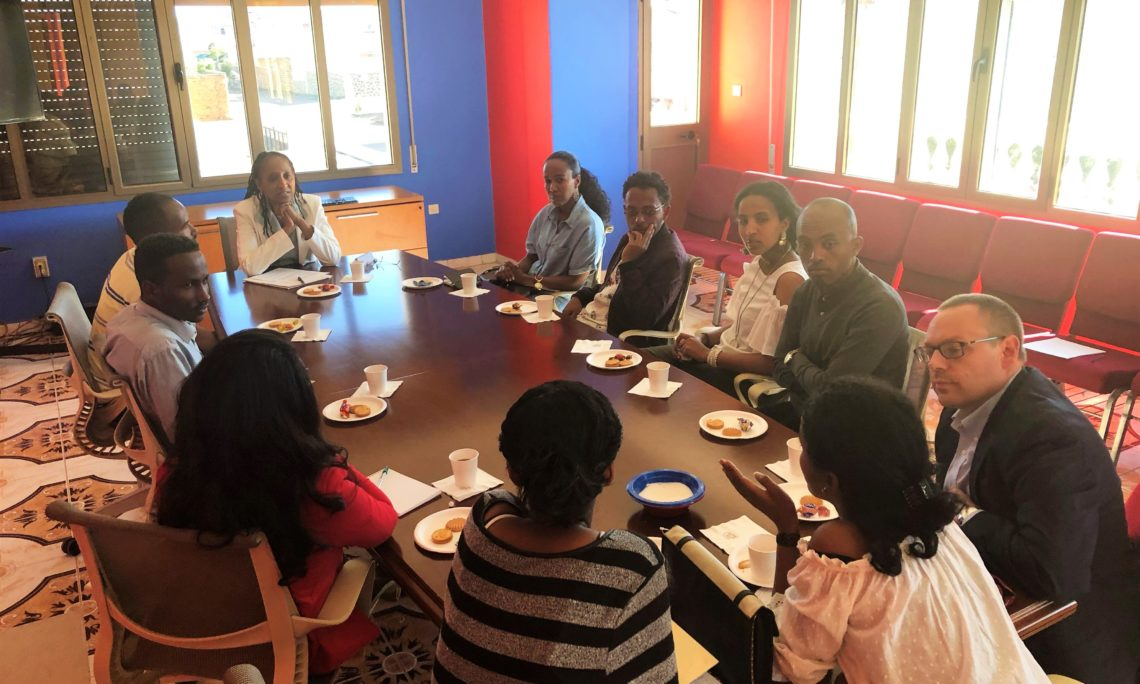
Deputy Assistant Secretary James meeting with Young African Leaders Initiative participants in Eritrea in 2018

Beginning in September 2018, James served as Deputy Assistant Secretary for East Africa and the Sudans within the Bureau of African Affairs at the Department of State. In this role, she traveled to Khartoum in April 2019 following the 2019 Sudanese coup d'état, urging the Transitional Military Council to "heed the people of Sudan's legitimate demand for a civilian led, inclusive and representative government that respects human rights." Following the Khartoum massacre in June 2019, James said that U.S.-imposed sanctions were possible if such events took place again. She remained in the deputy assistant secretary position until 2020.

== Subsequent career ==
James is a senior advisor at the Africa Center within the United States Institute of Peace. She has also been an adjunct lecturer at the Johns Hopkins School of Advanced International Studies.

== See also ==
- Ambassadors of the United States

Diplomatic posts
Preceded by Earl M. Irving	United States Ambassador to Swaziland; 2012–2016	Succeeded by Lisa J. Peterson
