= Gregory Lee Johnson (ambassador) =

US Ambassador to Swaziland

Gregory Lee Johnson (born July 18, 1945) was the American Ambassador to Swaziland from 1999 until 2001. Johnson was also Consul General at the U.S. Consulate General in Osaka-Kobe, Japan from 1989 until 1992 and Consul General in Toronto from 1996 until 1999.

== Education ==
Johnson graduated from Franklin High School before earning a bachelor of arts degree in political science in 1967 from Washington State University. He earned his master's degree in International Relations from American University in 1969 on a Ford Foundation scholarship.

== Career ==
=== Tenure in Swaziland ===
It has been said that “Johnson‘s greatest challenge was in helping Swaziland confront its HIV/AIDS epidemic where one-fifth of its one million people were HIV-positive.” He also “helped negotiate the lifting of sanctions on cane sugar exports from Swaziland to the U.S. and played a key role in gaining commitment from the Government of Swaziland to contribute resources to the United Nations and the Organization of African Unity (OAU) peacekeeping efforts in Northeast and West Africa.”
