= Jeanne M. Maloney =

American diplomat & policy advisor

Jeanne Maloney
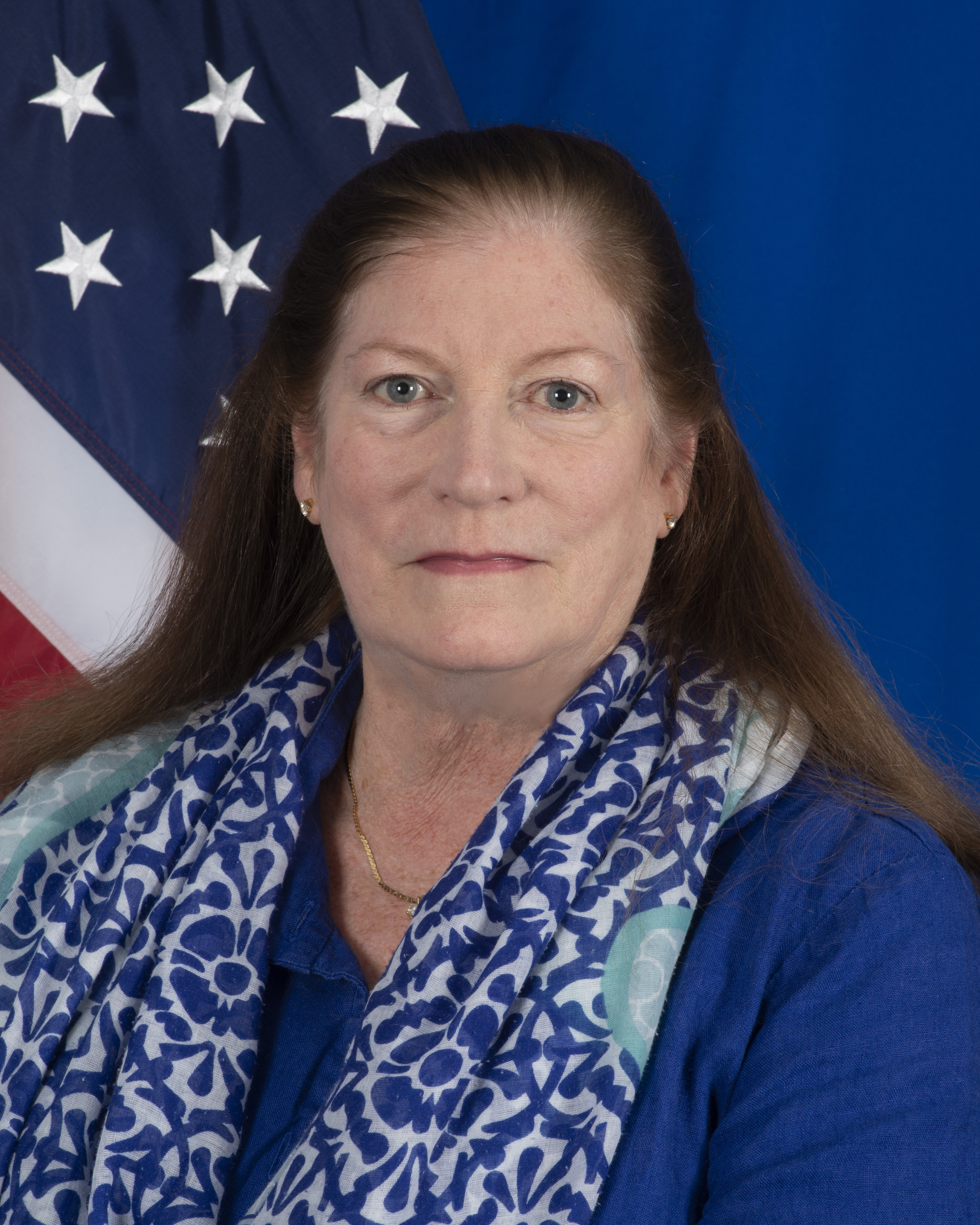

United States Ambassador to Eswatini
- In office March 4, 2021 – December 20, 2022
- President: Donald Trump; Joe Biden
- Preceded by: Lisa J. Peterson

Personal details
- Education: College of William and Mary (BA); University of Tulsa (MBA)

Jeanne Marie Maloney is an American diplomat and she was United States Ambassador to Eswatini.

== Early life and education ==
Maloney earned a Bachelor of Arts from the College of William and Mary and a Master of Business Administration from the University of Tulsa.

== Career ==
Maloney is a career member of the Senior Foreign Service, class of Minister-Counselor. She has served in various leadership positions at the State Department over the course of her career, including as Career Development Officer in the Bureau of Human Resources, Director of the Office of Terrorist Screening and Interdiction in the Bureau of Counterterrorism and Countering Violent Extremism, and Deputy Political-Military Counselor at the United States Embassy in Baghdad. Maloney was also the Director of the Office of Fraud Prevention Programs in the Bureau of Consular Affairs. Previously, she was the Director of the Office of Security Affairs in the State Department's Bureau of African Affairs. She previously served as the Foreign Policy Advisor to United States Army Africa in Vicenza, Italy.

== Ambassador to Eswatini ==
On May 1, 2020, President Trump announced his intent to nominate Maloney to be the next United States Ambassador to Eswatini. On May 19, 2020, her nomination was sent to the Senate. On November 18, 2020, her nomination was confirmed in the United States Senate by voice vote. She took the oath of office on December 9, 2020. She presented her credentials to King Mswati III on March 4, 2021. Maloney retired on December 20, 2022.

== Personal life ==
Maloney speaks Portuguese, Spanish, and basic Arabic.

== See also ==
- Ambassadors of the United States

Diplomatic posts
Preceded by Lisa J. Peterson	United States Ambassador to Eswatini; 2021–2022	Vacant
