= Maura A. Harty =

American diplomat (born 1959)

Maura Ann Harty
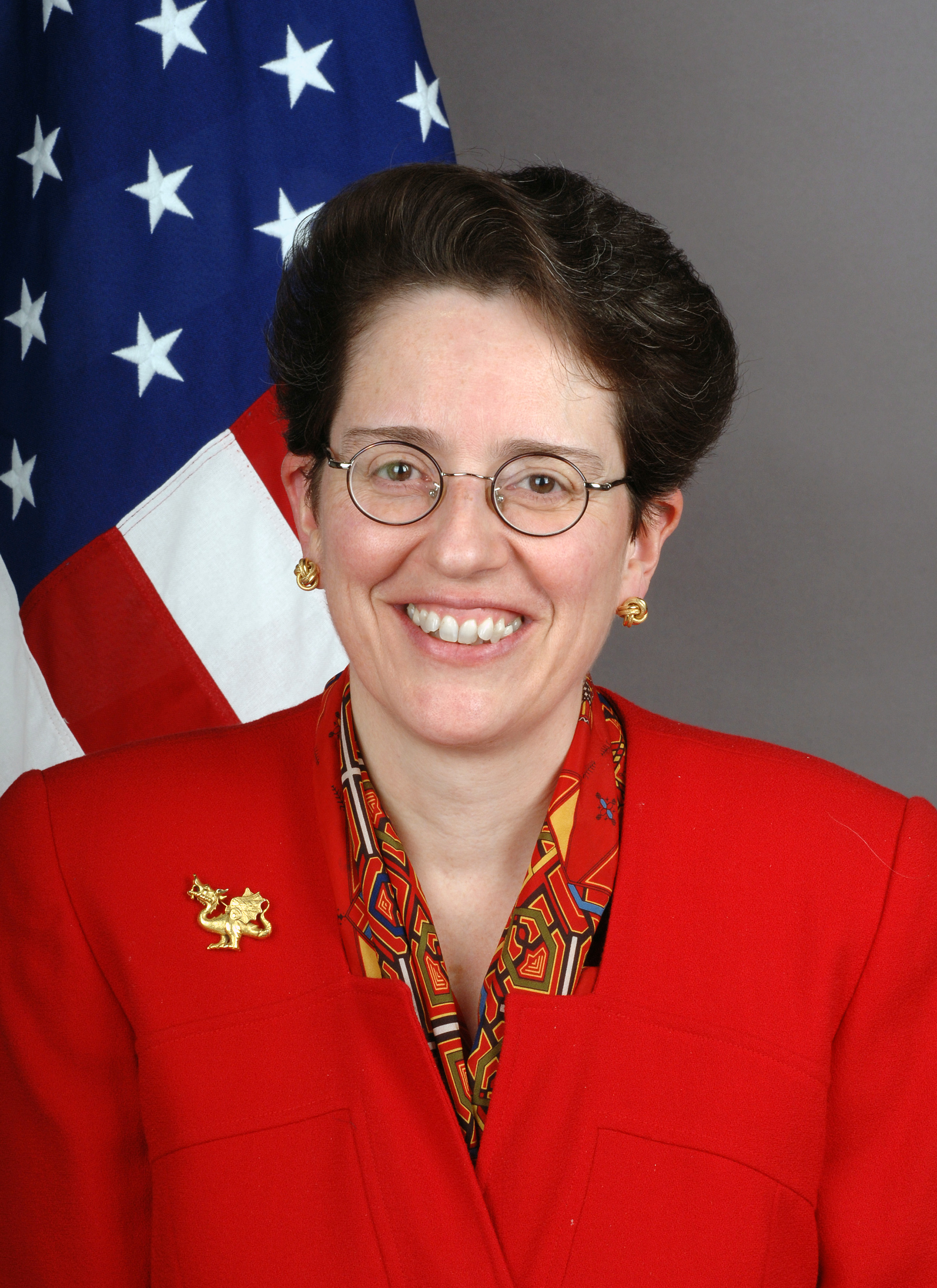
- Maura Harty in 2006

19th Executive Secretary of the United States Department of State
- In office 2001–2002
- Preceded by: Kristie Ann Kenney
- Succeeded by: Karl William Hofmann

12th Assistant Secretary of State for Consular Affairs
- In office November 20, 2002 – February 29, 2008
- Preceded by: Mary A. Ryan
- Succeeded by: Janice L. Jacobs

Personal details
- Born: 1959 (age 66–67)

Maura Ann Harty (born 1959) is an American diplomat. She was United States Assistant Secretary of State for Consular Affairs from November 21, 2002, to February 29, 2008. She was a career member of the Senior Foreign Service. She was then the president and CEO of the Mid-Atlantic Chapter of the Make a Wish Foundation. In November 2014, Harty was appointed president and CEO of the International Centre for Missing & Exploited Children (ICMEC).

== Biography ==
Harty is a native of Staten Island, New York. She graduated from New Dorp High School in 1977, where she was elected "Most Likely to Succeed" and "Class Citizen". Harty received her bachelor's degree at Georgetown University's School of Foreign Service, where she was a member of the Mu Alpha chapter of the service fraternity Alpha Phi Omega.

She began her career with the Department of State in 1981 as a vice-consul in Mexico City, Mexico, and was one of two Foreign Service Officers sent to accompany U.S. forces during the invasion of Grenada (to help evacuate American citizen medical students from the island).

Harty went on to serve several tours in Washington, DC, including tours in the State Department's Operations Center and as special assistant to Secretary of State George Shultz, executive assistant to Secretary Warren Christopher, and executive secretary of the department under Secretary Colin Powell. She also served abroad at the U.S. embassies in Bogotá, Colombia, and Madrid, Spain, before being appointed U.S. Ambassador to Paraguay from 1997 to 1999.

During her tenure as assistant secretary, Harty oversaw the introduction of new visa security regulations in response to the September 11, 2001 attacks, as well as the identification and evacuation of American citizens after the tsunami in Indonesia and the war between Israel and Lebanon in 2006. In her position, she served as primary liaison within the Department of State to the Department of Homeland Security's Customs and Border Protection and Citizenship and Immigration Services on security and visa issues. She announced her February 2008 retirement from the Foreign Service on November 21, 2007, the five-year anniversary of her swearing-in as assistant secretary.

In November 2014, Harty was appointed president and CEO of the International Centre for Missing & Exploited Children (ICMEC).

== See also ==
- Office of Children's Issues

Diplomatic posts
Preceded by Robert Edward Service	United States Ambassador to Paraguay; October 22, 1997 – May 30, 1999	Succeeded by David N. Greenlee
Government offices
Preceded by Mary A. Ryan	Assistant Secretary of State for Consular Affairs; November 20, 2002 – February 29, 2008	Succeeded by Janice L. Jacobs
