= African Well Fund =

US-based non-profit organization

African Well Fund is a non-profit organization dedicated to raising funds for the construction and maintenance of freshwater wells throughout impoverished sections of Africa. It was founded in October 2002 by a group of U2 fans who were inspired by frontman Bono's May 2002 visit to poor sections of Africa along with former U.S. Secretary of the Treasury Paul O'Neill. The organization was inspired by Bono's charitable work throughout Africa, but is not directly connected to the band.

The organization is partnered with Africare, and is staffed entirely by volunteers to minimize overhead.

== History ==
In 2002, fans of the band U2 were inspired by Bono's visit to Uganda and began raising money for a well in Africa. By 2005, the nonprofit group had 135 members and raised more than $110,000.

Funds donated to the African Well Fund are used by Africare, which works with local communities. Local communities that have a well installed by the project select a water user committee to monitor and maintain the facility. The Africare-connected representatives who help set up the wells use that as an opportunity to also educate the community about the issues of HIV and AIDS.

For Bono's 50th birthday, U2 fans attempted to raise $50,000 for the Buhara District in Zimbabwe.
