= Lisa J. Peterson =

American diplomat (born 1964)

Lisa Peterson
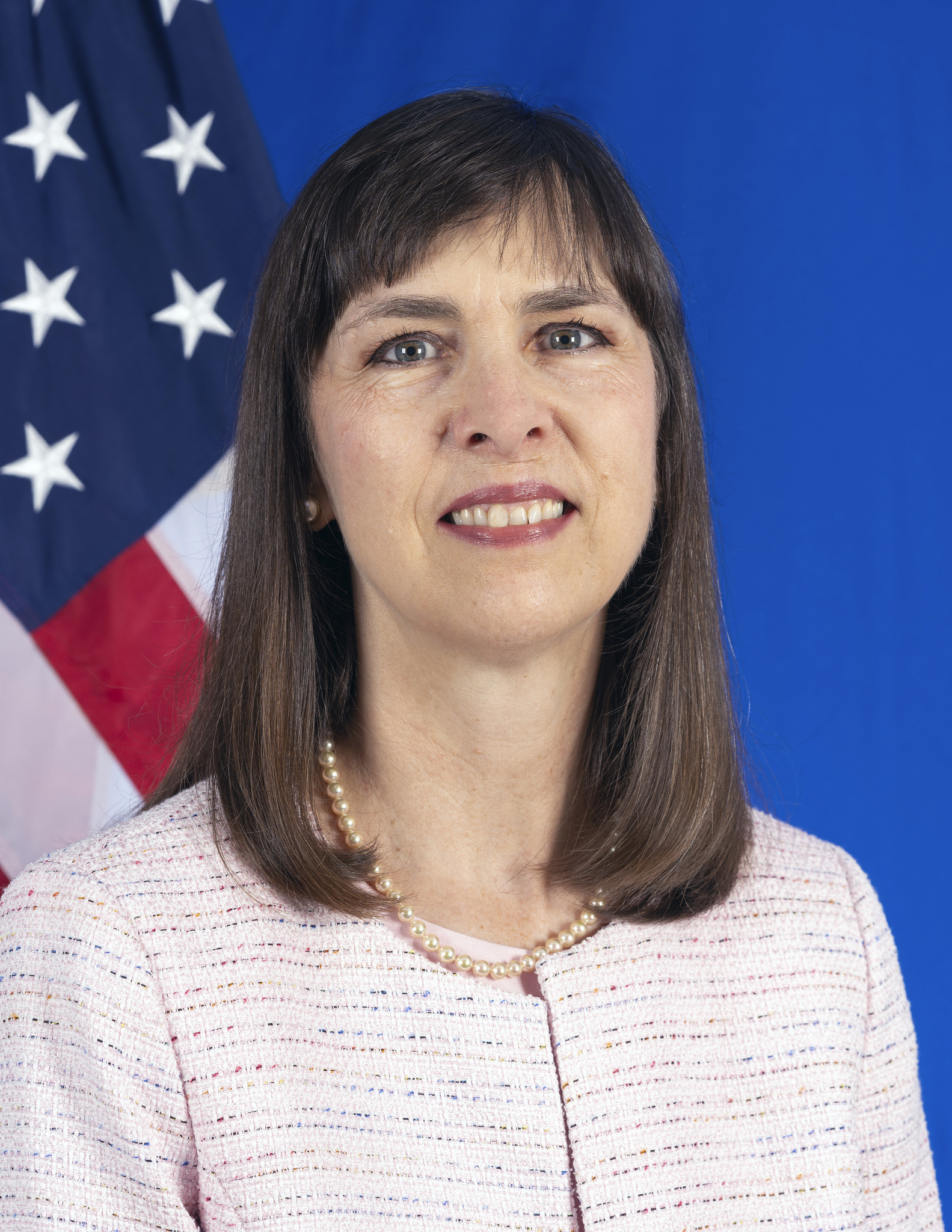

United States Ambassador to Burundi
- In office June 27, 2024 – January 18, 2026
- President: Joe Biden; Donald Trump
- Preceded by: Melanie Harris Higgins

United States Ambassador to Eswatini
- In office February 5, 2016 – December 1, 2020
- President: Barack Obama; Donald Trump
- Preceded by: Makila James
- Succeeded by: Jeanne Maloney

Personal details
- Born: 1964 (age 61–62)
- Education: University of Rochester (BA)

Lisa J. Peterson (born 1964) is an American diplomat who served United States ambassador to Burundi. She had served United States ambassador to Eswatini between January 20 and July 14, 2021, she served in the Biden administration as the acting under secretary of state for civilian security, democracy, and human rights in 2021.

== Early life and education ==
Peterson is a 1986 graduate of the University of Rochester, where she earned a Bachelor of Arts in political science.

== Career ==
After college graduation Peterson accepted a position at the University of Rochester's Carlson Mathematics and Sciences Library. In 1988 she joined the university's Department of Chemistry.

In 1989 Peterson joined the Foreign Service. She served in the embassy in the Central African Republic, and after two years accepted a two-year assignment as vice consul at the U.S. Consulate General in South Africa.

Peterson then returned to the U.S. an analyst for Bolivia, Ecuador and Peru in the Bureau of Intelligence and Research. In 1996 she began a series of international assignments to Kinshasa, Democratic Republic of the Congo; Lusaka, Zambia, and Nairobi, Kenya.

In 2006 Peterson returned to the U.S. as deputy director of the Office of Central African Affairs in the Bureau of African Affairs.

In 2007 she returned to Africa as the cultural officer in Abuja, Nigeria. Two years later she became deputy chief of mission at the embassy in Yaounde, Cameroon.

=== Ambassador to Eswatini ===
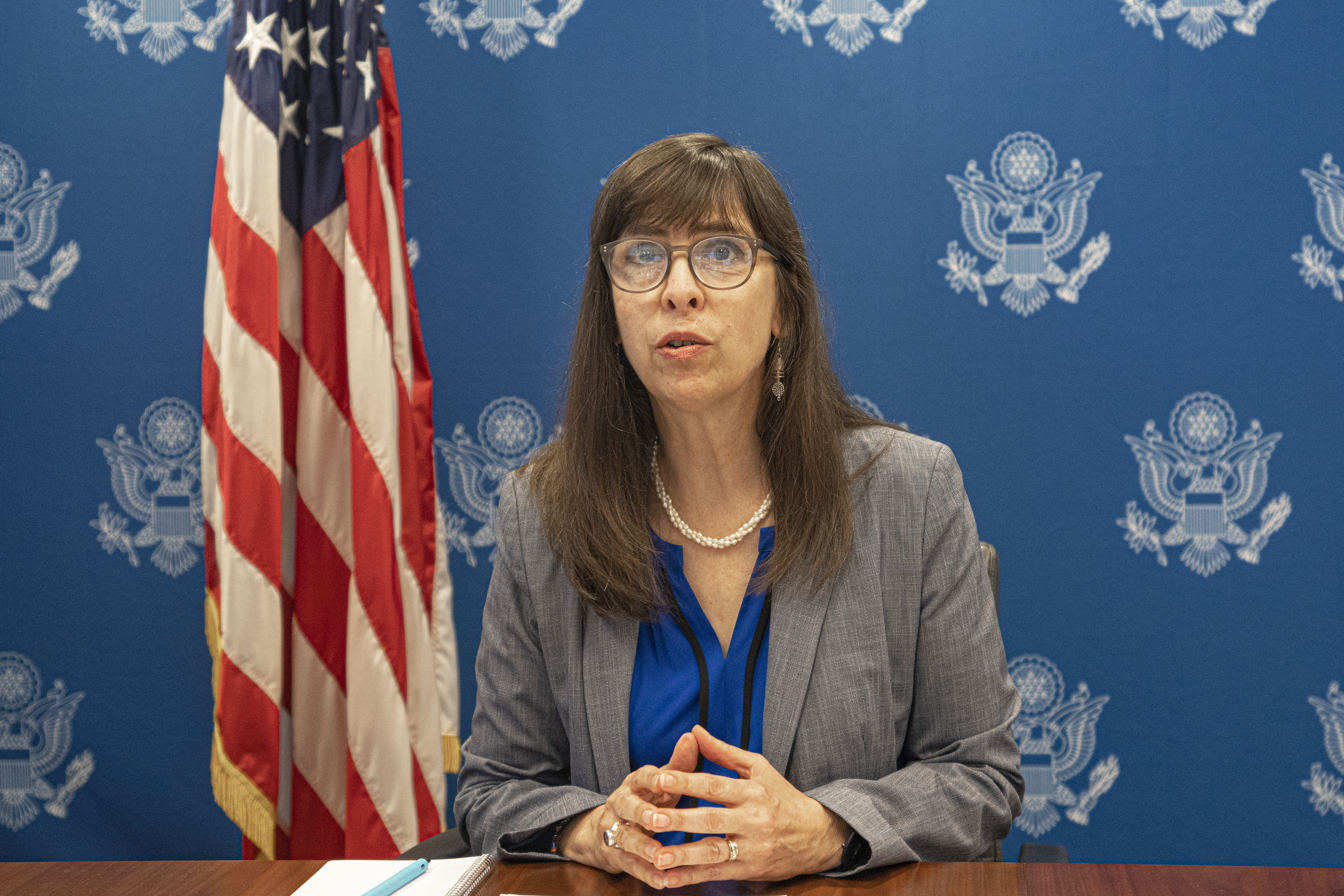
Peterson participating in a virtual roundtable with former Xinjiang re-education camp detainees and advocates in July 2021.

When she was nominated on November 16, 2015 to become United States ambassador to Swaziland (now Eswatini), she was Director of the Office of Multilateral and Global Affairs in the U.S. Department of State's Bureau of Democracy, Human Rights, and Labor, a position she had held since 2012.

=== Ambassador to Burundi ===
On April 5, 2023, President Joe Biden nominated Peterson to be the next ambassador to Burundi. Hearings on her nomination were held before the Senate Foreign Relations Committee on June 21, 2023. The entire Senate confirmed her nomination on May 2, 2024, by voice vote. She presented her credentials to Évariste Ndayishimiye on June 27, 2024.

== Personal ==
Peterson is married to Siza Ntshakala, a fellow State Department employee. They have a son. She speaks French.

Diplomatic posts
| Preceded by Makila James | United States Ambassador to Eswatini; 2016–2020 | Succeeded by John Moyer; Chargé d'Affaires |
