= Janice L. Jacobs =

American diplomat

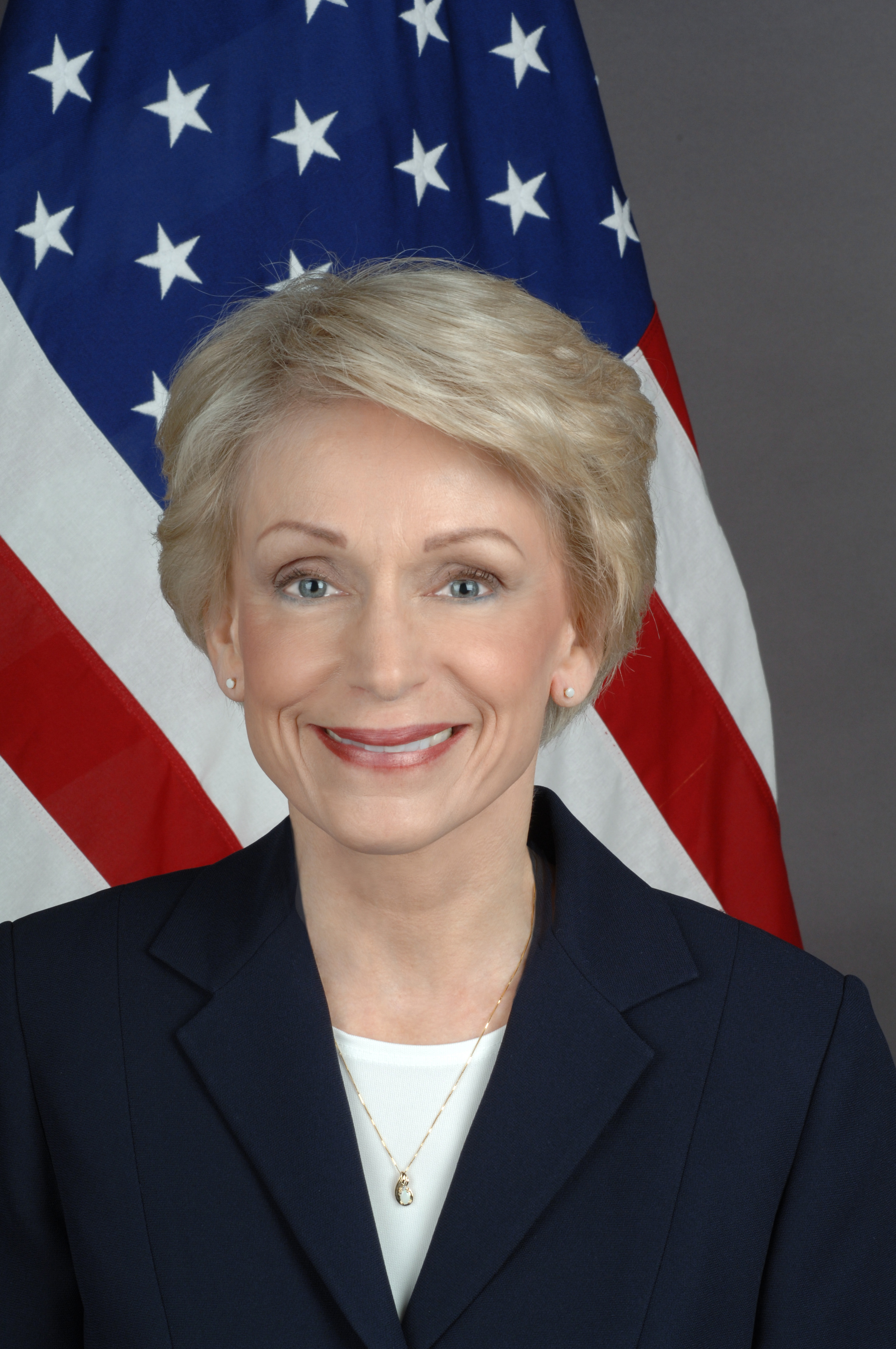

13th Assistant Secretary of State for Consular Affairs
- In office June 10, 2008 – April 4, 2014
- President: George W. Bush; Barack Obama
- Preceded by: Maura Harty
- Succeeded by: Michele T. Bond

Personal details
- Born: 1946 (age 79–80)
- Spouse: Ken
- Education: Southern Illinois University (BA); National War College (MA)

Janice Lee Jacobs (born 1946) was a United States career Senior Foreign Service Officer who was the Assistant Secretary of State for Consular Affairs, June 2008 to April 2014. She was United States Ambassador to Senegal concurrently accredited to Guinea-Bissau from April 2006 to June 2007.

== Biography ==
=== Personal ===
Janice L. Jacobs was educated at Southern Illinois University, receiving a Bachelor of Arts in French in 1968. She later received a Master of Arts in National Security Strategy from the National War College in 1995. Her husband, Ken Friedman, works for the Department of Defense. Jacobs spent many years overseas as a dependent of her father who was an education officer with USAID and of her first husband, Royce Fichte, a Foreign Service Officer.

=== Career ===
Jacobs joined the United States Foreign Service in March 1980. In her career as a Foreign Service Officer, she was posted in Senegal, the Dominican Republic, Ecuador, Egypt, Ethiopia (twice), France, Mexico (twice), Nigeria, and Thailand. She also spent time posted to the United States Department of State in Washington, D.C., in the State Department's Visa Office, Operations Center, and Office of Cuban Affairs. In 2000, she became Deputy Chief of Mission of the United States Embassy in Santo Domingo. In October 2002, she moved to Washington, D.C. to become Deputy Assistant Secretary for Visa Services.

In February 2006, President of the United States George W. Bush named Jacobs United States Ambassador to Senegal and United States Ambassador to Guinea-Bissau. She presented her credentials on May 9, 2006, and formally left Dakar on July 15, 2007. President Bush nominated Jacobs as Assistant Secretary of State for Consular Affairs and she was sworn into this office on June 10, 2008. She retired from the position in 2014.

In September 2015, Secretary of State John Kerry appointed Jacobs to the newly created position of "Transparency Coordinator." This position was created to coordinate the State Department response to the myriad of document requests related to former Secretary of State Hillary Clinton's email scandal. This appointment caused minor controversy after it was reported that Jacobs had donated to Hillary for America in June 2015. Jacobs contributed $2,700, which is the maximum allowed by law, to Clinton's campaign on June 22, according to Federal Election Commission records.

Diplomatic posts
Preceded by Richard Allan Roth	United States Ambassador to Guinea-Bissau; 2006–2007	Succeeded by Marcia S. B. Bernicat
Preceded by Richard Allen Roth	United States Ambassador to Senegal; 2006–2007	Succeeded by Marcia S. B. Bernicat
Government offices
Preceded by Maura Harty	Assistant Secretary of State for Consular Affairs; June 10, 2008 – April 4, 2014	Succeeded by Michele Thoren Bond
