= June Carter Perry =

American diplomat

June Carter Perry (born November 13, 1943, in Texarkana, Arkansas) is a member of the American Academy of Diplomacy and a retired American Ambassador (Sierra Leone from August 27, 2007, to August 28, 2009, and Lesotho from 2004 to 2007. In 2016, she was inducted into the Arkansas Hall of Fame.

Perry is a graduate of Loyola University in Chicago (B.A., history, 1965) and the University of Chicago (M.A. European History, 1967). In 2011, Loyola presented her with its alumni Coffey Award for her work in diplomacy and humanitarian affairs.

Prior to her government career, Perry was a lecturer at the University of Maryland College Park in the history department (1969–1970). Immediately before she joined the Foreign Service, Perry was the public affairs director and a broadcaster for WGMS/RKO Radio in Washington, D.C., special assistant in the Community Services Administration and the public affairs director for the Peace Corps, the ACTION agency, and VISTA.

In the Department of State she was deputy ambassador in Madagascar (1998–2000) and in the Central African Republic where she coordinated the international diplomatic corps during a military mutiny (1996–1997). In Washington, she was director of the department's Office of Social and Humanitarian Affairs overseeing U.S. liaison with United Nations Committees in Geneva and New York (2002–2004) following her service as diplomat in residence at Howard University (2001–2002). While in Lesotho, she arranged for funding that led to the first water delivery system throughout the country. In Sierra Leone, she helped the country transition from a very long civil war as well as an anti-AIDS campaign. She returned to the US in 2009 and retired from the U.S. Department of State in January 2010. In 2011, she became the Cyrus Vance Visiting Professor of International Relations through 2012 at Mount Holyoke College in Massachusetts.

Subsequently, she was the Monroe Paine guest lecturer at the Harry S Truman School of Public Affairs at the University of Missouri Columbia (2013). In the public non-profit sector, Ambassador Perry served several years on the board of directors at Africare, the Washington Commission on the Humanities and as chair of the Federal City Public Service Foundation (2011–2015). She is currently on the board of directors of American Diplomacy Publishers in Chapel Hill, North Carolina.

== Selected publications ==
- "Broadening the Foreign Service: the Role of Diplomats in Residence" American Diplomacy August 2020
- "Woman of Words and Action" Washington Post 2014.
- "Ancient African Heroines" Washington Post 1983
- Bremer "Report on the Foreign Service" 1989
- State Department, "Relevance of African American Studies" 2000, State Department School of Leadership Foreign Service Institute
