= Goler T. Butcher =

American lawyer

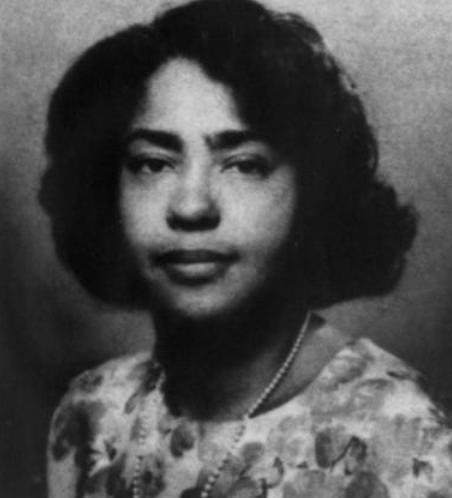
- Goler T. Butcher, from a 1963 publication of the US Department of State
- Born: 13 July 1925; Philadelphia, Pennsylvania
- Died: June 9, 1993 (aged 67); Washington, D.C.
- Occupations: Lawyer, government official, college professor

Goler Teal Butcher (July 13, 1925 – June 9, 1993) was a lawyer, scholar, advocate, and professor of international law.

== Early life and education ==
Butcher was born in Philadelphia, Pennsylvania. She graduated from the University of Pennsylvania with a BA in 1946. She was a member of Phi Beta Kappa at Penn. She earned a law degree at Howard University School of Law in 1957, and an LLM at the University of Pennsylvania in 1958, with a thesis titled "The Choice of Law Rules Applied to International Sales Transactions". At Howard she was editor-in-chief of the school's law review.

== Career ==
Butcher's long-term teaching post was at Howard University School of Law, where she created the Goler Teal Butcher Award to attract students in international law to the university.

Butcher's public work began in 1963 as attorney at the Office of the Legal Advisor, Department of State. From 1971 to 1974, she was a consultant to the House Foreign Affairs Committee's Subcommittee on Africa. She also served as Assistant Administrator for Africa, Agency for International Development under the Carter Administration, and head of the Clinton Transition Team for the Agency of International Development in 1992.

At the forefront of Butcher's human rights advocacy was her passion for ending global hunger and apartheid in South Africa. Butcher's advocacy of the right to freedom from hunger, specifically "starvation, chronic hunger, malnutrition," always followed by encouraging the privileged world to act on their duty to help in ending hunger. She recognized "[h]unger is not a mere matter of geography or of distribution of food. It relates to powerlessness, financial, economic and political powerlessness of individuals and social classes within nations and within the international community."

=== Approach to ending global hunger ===
Butcher believed that there were two approaches to solving the problem of global hunger, a short-term and long-term approach. The short-term approach is providing food to hungry people and the long-term approach is aiding the country to produce and develop its own food and move towards changing terms of trade. With regard to the long-term approach, Butcher promoted the idea that there is an affirmative duty on the richer or donor countries, "to adjust -- insofar as congruent with the needs of their own countries -- the terms of trade so that they are equitable and permit the countries where large groups of hungry peoples exist to have the necessary funds (a) to buy both food and the technological assistance, training and various inputs necessary for them to produce food themselves and (b) to be able to have the financial resources to move forward in their development efforts." The negative duty on donor countries is for them to exclude their agricultural sectors from international negotiations and trade liberalization because of the negative effects of industrialized countries dumping of food surpluses on developing countries, the effect on prices for agricultural products and on country imports.

In addition to the duty on the donor countries, the developing countries also have a duty to "establish new laws, amend existing laws, adapt the administrative and regulatory machinery of the state to effectuate the desired economic and development programs, to implement the priorities of the government generally and with respect to agriculture pricing and marketing patterns, the agriculture sector, foreign exchange rates, both as to food and cash crops through budgetary allocations and national investment policies."

=== Influence on United States foreign policy on global hunger ===
In 1977, Butcher became the first black woman to hold the position of assistant administrator to AID Africa. One of Butcher's "first actions upon becoming assistant administrator for Africa, was to examine the steps AID had taken in the past to provide opportunity for entities owned, managed or principally identified with minorities and women to serve in its program as contractors and grantees..." In her new position, Butcher testified before Congress in hearings dealing with the inadequacy of small business contracting policies in the Africa Bureau due to contracting barriers constructed during the Ford administration. Butcher believed that AID had a responsibility "to assure that contractors exercise equal opportunity employment," and this responsibility had been "virtually ignored." "In addition to compliance with existing law and contracting regulations, Butcher proposed several new initiatives, one of which established the Minority Involvement Office in the Africa Bureau."

Later that year, "Butcher returned to Congress to explain why the U.S. should be more responsive to Africa's development." Butcher called Africa "the stepchildren of our foreign assistance program" and informed Congress of the minimizing AID assistance since 1962, but was encouraged by the "current $155 million in development assistance." During her address, Butcher outlined initiatives to "overcome hunger and malnutrition ... [to train] personnel in agricultural skills ... [to construct] the rural infrastructure necessary for delivery of inputs and information and the outward movement of produce ... [to assist] in the development of educational systems [and to give] greater attention to the geographical allocation of our assistance in terms of common or interrelated problems among the countries of the continent ..."

Each fiscal year Butcher would "map out her imaginative programs and her vision of enlarging the role of AID in assistance programs in Africa" to the House Subcommittee. In 1979, Butcher noted that Africa was lagging "behind ... the rest of the countries in the developing world." She attributed this lag to the geographical isolation of Africa and the shortage of trained manpower, an area AID Africa specifically targeted. In order to avoid falling on deaf ears after her frequent testimonials, Butcher would tie U.S. incentives into reasons why the U.S. should focus on supporting Africa's development programs. Specifically, Butcher pointed out that Africa possesses "substantial[ly] confirmed or highly probable deposits of important minerals."

== Volunteer positions ==
Among her volunteer positions, Butcher was:

- board member - Amnesty International
- honorary vice-president - American Society of International Law
- member - Lawyers Committee for Civil Rights under Law
- member - International Human Rights Law Group
- member - Council on Foreign Relations (1992)

== Personal life and legacy ==
Goler Teal married George Hench Butcher Jr., a mathematics professor at Howard University. They had four children. Goler T. Butcher died after a heart attack in 1993, aged 67 years, in Washington, D.C. The Howard University's Goler Teal Butcher International Moot Court Team honors her name. The American Society of International Law created the Goler T. Butcher Medal in her honor, awarded since 1997 to leading people in international law.
