= Mosina H. Jordan =

American diplomat (born 1943)

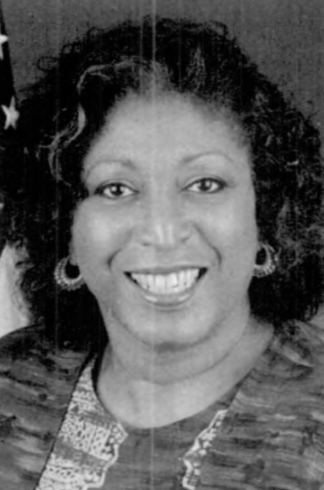

United States Ambassador to the Central African Republic
- In office November 29, 1995 – March 31, 1997
- President: Bill Clinton
- Preceded by: Robert E. Gribbin III
- Succeeded by: Robert C. Perry

Personal details
- Born: December 14, 1943 (age 81); Brooklyn, New York, U.S.
- Spouse: George Jordan
- Children: 3
- Education: New York University (BA); American University (JD)

Mosina H. Jordan (born December 14, 1943) is an American lawyer and diplomat from New York.

== Early life ==
Jordan was born in Brooklyn, New York, to father Frank Monterio, a stevedore from Cape Verde and mother Alice Hitt (née Jones), a native of Selma, Alabama. She grew up in the Brighton Beach neighborhood of Brooklyn, graduating from Abraham Lincoln High School in 1960. She later lived in Queens.

During high school, Jordan volunteered in the civil rights movement with classmates, working for A. Philip Randolph in support of the Brotherhood of Sleeping Car Porters, the first African American labor union.

In 1964, Jordan received a Bachelor of Arts degree in pre-med and math from New York University. While at NYU, Jordan became captain of the women's varsity fencing team. She was the first African American captain of a varsity team at NYU.

In 1973, after attending Howard University Law School and UCLA Law School, Jordan received a Juris Doctor from American University.

== Career ==
Jordan began her career in public service working as a social worker in New York City in the 1960s. She worked at the U.S. Senate Appropriations Committee’s Subcommittee on Labor, Health, Human Services, and Education, and at the Community Services Administration. She held administrative postings in Belize and Cameroon, as well as Regional Development Office of the Caribbean in Barbados.

From June 1995 to March 1997, Jordan, a Career Member of the Senior Foreign Service, Class of Minister-Counselor, was appointed Ambassador Extraordinary and Plenipotentiary of the United States to the Central African Republic. During her time there, Jordan sent U.S. Marine Corps into the Central African Republic.

Jordan served at the U.S. Agency for International Development as Counselor until April 25, 2008. Counsel is the third ranking position at the Agency and Jordan was the first African American to hold the position. She was as ombudsman for career employees at the United States Agency for International Development, a senior career officer position, advising the Administrator and other senior staff on a wide range of policy, operational, and management issues.

== Personal life ==
Jordan married George Jordan, who she met while training to be a social worker. They initially attended Howard University Law School together. The couple has three children.

Diplomatic posts
Preceded by Robert E. Gribbin, 3rd	United States Ambassador to Central African Republic; 1995	Succeeded by Robert C. Perry
