= Stephen H. Rogers =

American diplomat (1930–2025)

8th United States Ambassador to Swaziland
- In office 1990 – 1993

Personal details
- Born: June 21, 1930 Flushing, New York, U.S.
- Died: July 27, 2025 (aged 95)

Stephen Hitchcock Rogers (June 21, 1930 – July 27, 2025) was an American diplomat who was a career Foreign Service officer, serving as the American Ambassador to Swaziland (now Eswatini) from 1990 until 1993.

== Early life and education ==
Rogers was born in Flushing, New York on June 21, 1930. When he was nine, Rogers and his family moved to Port Washington, New York and he graduated in 1948 from the Port Washington High School. He graduated from the Woodrow Wilson School of Public and International Affairs at Princeton University, attending on a Naval ROTC scholarship. After graduation, he spent three years on active duty. He arrived for part of his training in Pensacola, Florida just days before the Korean War broke out on June 25, 1950. He ended up serving on a destroyer in the Pacific. When he was discharged, he studied economics at Columbia University for a year, and took the Foreign Service exam during his first semester, at the end of 1955. He married Mila Kent Brain on June 23, 1956, after they had both received their MA's from Columbia. Rogers attended Harvard University, studying Public Administration, from 1961 to 1962.

Rogers died on July 27, 2025, at the age of 95.
