= George Washington Ellis =

African-American attorney, writer, and speaker

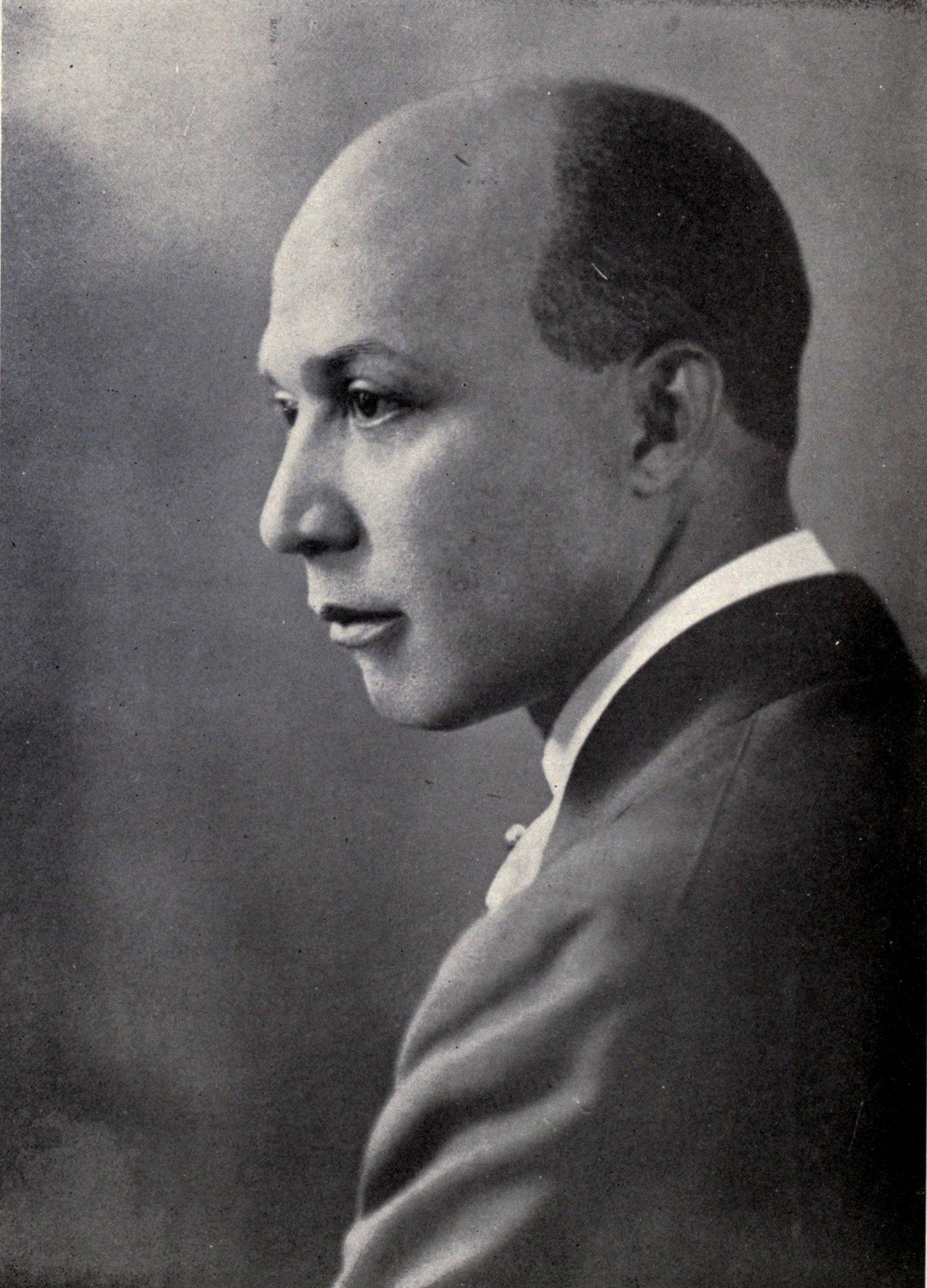
- George Washington Ellis
- Born: May 4, 1875
- Died: November 26, 1919 (aged 44)
- Occupation(s): African-American attorney, writer, and speaker

George Washington Ellis (May 4, 1875 – November 26, 1919) was an African-American attorney, writer, and speaker.

Ellis was born on May 4, 1875, in Weston, Missouri. He attended the University of Kansas, graduating in 1893 with a Bachelor of Law degree. He later attended Howard University in Washington, D.C., and Gunton's Institute of Economics and Sociology in New York City.

He practiced law for a few years following graduation, then in 1900 he went to work for the Census Department in Washington. From 1902 to 1910, Ellis was the secretary of the American delegation to the Republic of Liberia. Ellis was one of several African-American officials and ministers, many of them writers like himself, who were sent by the US to areas of Latin America, Europe, Asia and Africa between 1869 and the 1930s. Their writing and work on international diplomacy helped shape how the US approached racial diplomacy.

At the conclusion of his assignment in Liberia, Ellis returned to the U.S. and opened a law office in Chicago, Illinois.

Ellis wrote several publications and served as an editor of the Journal of Race Development.

He died in Chicago on November 26, 1919.
