= Julius E. Coles =

International development officer

Julius Earl Coles (born 1942) is the former President of Africare and is Director of Morehouse College's Andrew Young Center for International Affairs. He has spent over four decades engaged in international development work in Africa or for the benefit of African countries.

== Biography ==
Julius E. Coles is the former President of Africare and since 2009 has served as Director of Morehouse College's Andrew Young Center for International Affairs, a position he previously held from 1997 to 2002. He served as the Director of Howard University's Ralph J. Bunche International Affairs Center from 1994 to 1997. Most of Mr. Coles' career of some 28 years in the foreign service has been spent as a senior official with the United States Agency for International Development (USAID). While with USAID, Mr. Coles was Mission Director in Swaziland and Senegal and served in Vietnam, Morocco, Liberia, Nepal, and Washington, DC. He received a B.A. from Morehouse College (1964) and a Master's of Public Affairs from Princeton University's Woodrow Wilson School of Public and International Affairs (1966). He has also studied at the University of Geneva and the Graduate Institute of International Studies in Switzerland, the U.S. Department of State Foreign Institute's Senior Seminar, the Federal Executive Institute, and Institut de Francais. Mr. Coles retired from the U.S. Government Foreign Service in 1994 with the rank of Career Minister.

== Awards and Associations ==
Coles received numerous awards including the Global Citizen Award, International Youth Leadership Institute [2011], the Bennie Achievement Award, Morehouse College [2010], Princeton in Africa Lifetime Achievement Award [2009], the James Madison Medal, Princeton University [2007], Morehouse College National Alumnus of the Year [2006], Amistad Achievement Award [2003], Distinguished Career Service Award (1995), the Presidential Meritorious Service Award (1983-1986), and was decorated by President Abdou Diouf of Senegal as Commander in the Order of Lion (1994).

He is a member of the boards of The African Development Foundation, Health and Development International, The Mountain Institute, Andrew Young Center for International Affairs at Morehouse College and Princeton University's Woodrow Wilson School, Academy for Educational Development . In addition, he was elected as a member of the National Academy of Public Administration, Sigma Pi Phi fraternity, Omega Psi Phi fraternity, Rotary Club of Atlanta, Council on Foreign Relations, the Bretton Woods Committee and has been appointed as a member of the UNESCO International Commission on the Gorée Memorial.
