= Africare =

US-based non-profit organization

The Africare logo

Africare is a non-profit organization based in Washington, D.C., which provides development aid for Africa. It was founded by Dr. Joseph Kennedy and C. Payne Lucas in 1970, former Peace Corps members who worked in eastern Niger. Africare is the largest and oldest African-American founded international NGO focused exclusively on the continent of Africa. Since 1970, Africare has been partnering with local communities, focusing on agriculture and food security, healthcare, maternal and child health, HIV/AIDS, access to potable water, and women's empowerment. In more than 40 years of building partnerships with local communities, NGOs, governments and the private sector, Africare has invested over $1 billion in more than 35 countries in Sub-Saharan Africa.

== Organization ==
The organization employs men and women who are largely indigenous to the countries or to the areas where it works. More than 98% of the staff is of African descent and about 30 staff and volunteers work at the organization's headquarters in the Washington, D.C.

Africare's programs address needs mostly in the areas of food security and agriculture, health and HIV/AIDS, water and sanitation, and emergency and humanitarian aid. Africare also supports water resource development, environmental resource management, basic education, microenterprise development, governance initiatives, and women's empowerment.

=== Countries of operation ===
Africare currently has active programs in Angola, Benin, Burkina Faso, Chad, Ghana, Liberia, Malawi, Mali, Mozambique, Niger, Nigeria, Senegal, South Africa, Tanzania, and Zimbabwe.

== History ==
In 1970, when Africare was founded, West Africa was in the midst of one of the most severe droughts in its history. Among those providing help—medical aid to the Maine-Soroa town Hospital in Diffa, Niger—were 17 American volunteers, led by William O. Kirker, M.D., and Barbara Jean A. Kirker, who named their group "Africare". The Kirkers themselves had been working in Africa to improve African healthcare since 1966, but eventually they needed more support. Diori Hamani, then president of the Republic of Niger, appealed to the United States on the effort's behalf, asking, "Why don't black Americans, whose ancestors came from the continent, respond to the needs in Africa?"

C. Payne Lucas, then the director of the Peace Corps Office of Returned Volunteers in Washington, D.C. served previously in Niger and knew the president from that time. Lucas and others decided to form an organization to answer Hamani's appeal.

In 1970, Africare was incorporated in Hawaii, with Kirker as its founder and first president. In 1971, Africare was permanently reincorporated in Washington, D.C. Lucas became the executive director (later, that title changed to "president"), and Kirker joined the board. In addition to Kirker and Lucas, other incorporators were Oumarou G. Youssoufou, a Nigerian diplomat, and Joseph C. Kennedy, Ph.D., then in the Peace Corps. It began with a $39,550 budget, a U.S. headquarters in the basement of Lucas's home and one project in Niger.

Africare first concentrated on helping to alleviate the effects of severe drought in West Africa. By the mid-1970s, Africare had shifted its emphasis to development programs in the areas of food, water, the environment and health—expanding in the late 1980s to include microenterprise development, governance, basic education and, as it became necessary, HIV/AIDS response, as well as emergency humanitarian aid.

== Africare leadership ==
The president and CEO of Africare since November, 2015, is Robert L. Mallett. He develops Africare's strategic vision in a new environment for development assistance. He articulates Africare's unique guiding philosophy and value proposition. Mr. Mallett has a diverse background in law, government, public policy, healthcare and international development. Before joining Africare in late 2015, Mr. Mallett served on the board of directors for seven years and as president and CEO at Accordia Global Health Foundation which has just merged with Africare. He was a senior corporate executive at two of the world's largest companies. He was executive vice president and general counsel for the Public & Senior Markets Group at United Healthcare and at Pfizer Inc. he served as senior vice president of worldwide public affairs and policy and as president of the Pfizer Foundation. Mallett has been in private practice at international law firms in the United States, and served in former president Bill Clinton's administration as acting secretary and deputy secretary of the U.S. Department of Commerce. He is a graduate of Morehouse College and received a law degree from Harvard University.

In mid-June 2002, C. Payne Lucas retired after 31 years as president and Africare hired its third president, Julius E. Coles, a 28-year veteran of the U.S. Agency for International Development, the first director of the Ralph J. Bunche International Affairs Center at Howard University and, most recently, director of the Andrew Young Center for International Affairs at Morehouse College.

Dr. Darius Mans assumed the position of President of Africare on January 4, 2010. Prior to joining Africare, Dr. Mans served as acting chief executive officer of Millennium Challenge Corporation (MCC). Dr. Mans has over 30 years of development experience with a major focus on African countries. Prior to being tapped as acting chief executive officer for MCC, Dr. Mans was the organization's vice president of implementation where he oversaw the strategic and operational approaches of MCC's entire compact implementation portfolio of over $6.3 billion in 18 countries. Mans also served as MCC's managing director for Africa, where he drove an increase in commitments to Africa by $1.6 billion.

== See also ==
- African Well Fund

Penelope Campbell, Africare, Black American Philanthropy in Africa. Transaction Publishers, 2011.
