= Earl Michael Irving =

American diplomat (c. 1953 – 2022)

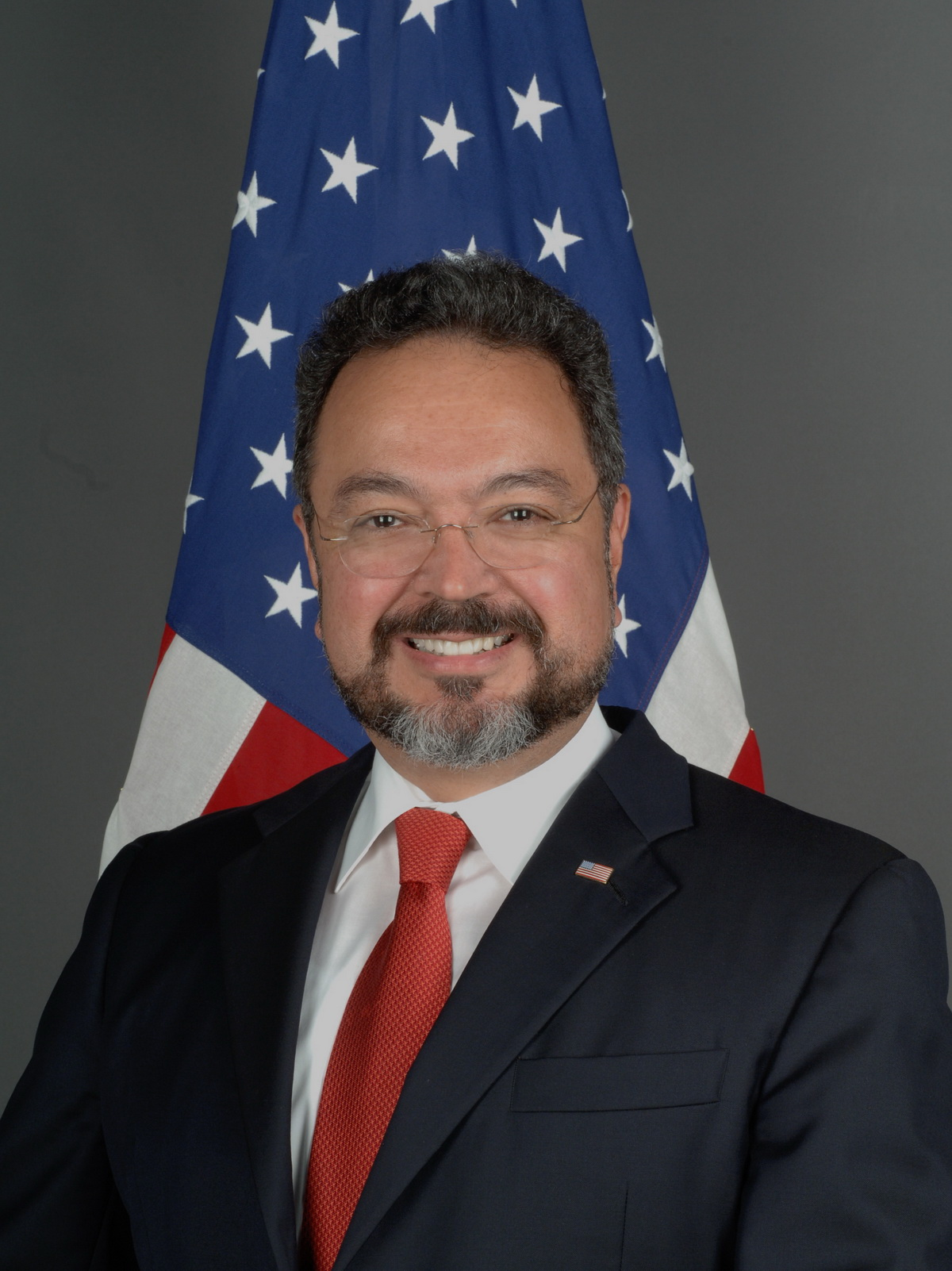
Earl M Irving ambassador

Earl Michael Irving (1953 – August 17, 2022) was an American diplomat who was a member of the Senior Foreign Service. He served as the U.S. ambassador to Swaziland (now Eswatini) from 2009 to 2012. From 2019, Irving served as the Senior Adviser to the Franklin Fellows Program at the Department of State.

Starting at the U.S. Department of State in January 1983, Irving served in several posts, including principal officer of the U.S. Consulate in Recife, Brazil, from 1995 to 1998, Consul General in Melbourne, Australia (2005–2008) and deputy chief of mission of the U.S. Embassy in Harare, Zimbabwe (1998–2001).

Irving was married to Jeanne Irving, and had a son Michael, and a daughter Zoe. He died on August 17, 2022, at the age of 69.
