= Robert H. Phinny =

American diplomat

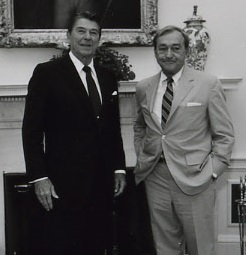
Robert H. Phinny and Ronald Reagan 1982

Robert H. Phinny (1921–2000) is a non-career appointee who served as the American Ambassador Extraordinary and Plenipotentiary to Swaziland from 1982 until 1984.

As a political appointee, Phinny's nomination has been criticized. Sanford Unger, writing about Ronald Reagan’s poor choices in appointments compared Theodore C. Maino’s appointment to Phinny’s by saying that

If Maino knows little about the turbulent politics of the region where he will serve, at least he is familiar with the animals. That puts him one small step ahead of Robert H. Phinny, 61, President Reagan's unfortunate choice as ambassador to Swaziland, also in southern Africa. At his own ever so brief confimation [sic!] hearing last July 15 (attended and conducted by a single senator, Republican Nancy Kassebaum of Kansas), Phinny seemed utterly bewildered about the ancient kingdom to which he was being assigned. He misstated administration policy on at least one important point, implying support for South Africa's controversial attempt to transfer to Swazi control 2,000 square miles of land and the black people who live on it.

Unger continues by talking about Phinny’s marriage to Sally Gerber of the Gerber baby food company and her mother’s considerable donations to the Republican Party.

Phinny was a public relations executive for Gerber when nominated. Phinny told the “Senate Foreign Relations Committee that his qualifications for the job included a ‘commitment to public service, having been involved with the Public Library Foundation, the Boy Scouts of America, the Rotary Club, the United Fund and the local Chamber of Commerce.’”

== Biography ==
Phinny attended Mercersburg Academy, the University of North Carolina at Chapel Hill and the Babson Institute.
