= Lana Marks =

American fashion designer and diplomat (born 1953)

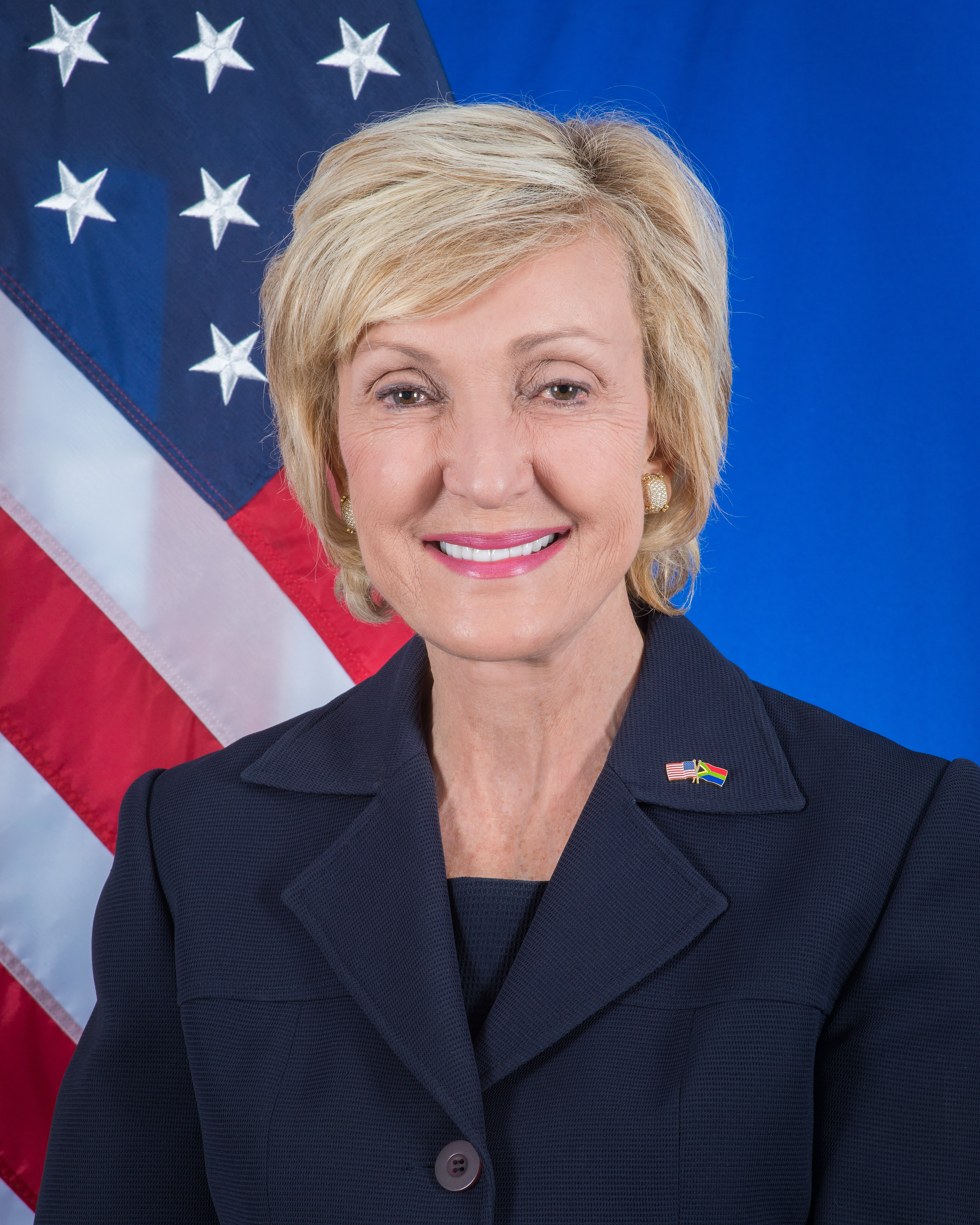
- Official portrait, 2019

United States Ambassador to South Africa
- In office January 28, 2020 – January 20, 2021
- President: Donald Trump
- Preceded by: Patrick Gaspard
- Succeeded by: Reuben Brigety

Personal details
- Born: Lana Bank; November 18, 1953 (age 72) East London, South Africa
- Party: Republican
- Spouse: Neville Marks (m. 1976)
- Children: 2

Lana J. Marks (born November 18, 1953) is a South African-born American business executive who founded the eponymous fashion brand. She is the former United States Ambassador to South Africa, having served from 2020 to 2021.

== Early life and education ==
Lana J. Marks was born in East London, South Africa. Her father, Alec Bank, had immigrated from Lithuania as a child; he was an affluent property developer and a leader in the Jewish community. She attended Clarendon High School for Girls in East London, and speaks Xhosa and Afrikaans.

Marks is an avid tennis player, having played for Bermuda, having won bronze medals for the United States in the Maccabiah Games in 1985, playing in the South African Open, and also made it to the qualifying rounds of the French Open.

== Career ==
Marks was the CEO and designer of Lana Marks, a fashion accessories brand which specializes in exotic leathers and is known for creating some of the world's most expensive handbags. When Helen Mirren won an Academy Award in 2007, she carried a handbag designed by Marks to the stage. Her daughter currently runs the brand. The Lana Marks company has stores in Palm Beach, New York, Beverly Hills, and Dubai.

=== Ambassador to South Africa ===
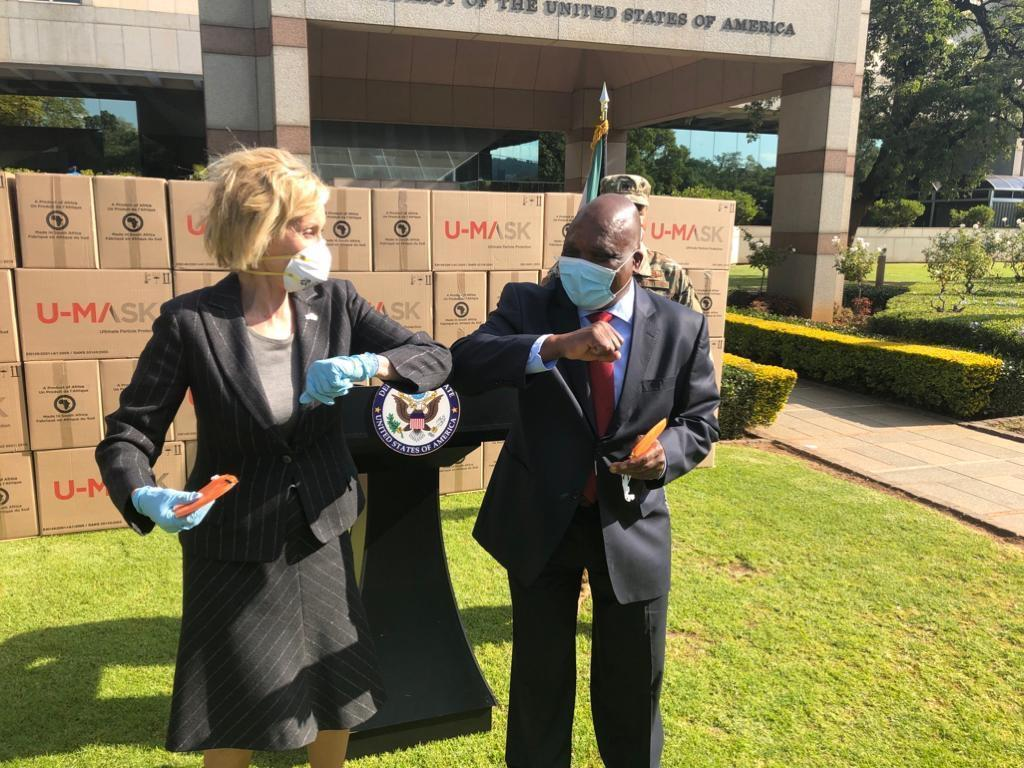
Marks and Joe Phaala, the South African Deputy Minister of Health, bump elbows as they mark the delivery of 720,000 face masks

Marks’s rumored appointment to the ambassadorship was leaked from a source within the Department of International Relations and Cooperation, South Africa's foreign affairs department. On November 14, 2018, President Donald Trump nominated Marks to be the United States Ambassador to South Africa. Marks had known Trump for more than two decades and was a member of his Mar-a-Lago club. She was unanimously confirmed by the Senate on September 26, 2019. She was sworn into office on October 4, 2019, and arrived at her posting on November 9, 2019, and presented her diplomatic credentials to President Cyril Ramaphosa on January 28, 2020.

Marks has been a member of Donald Trump's Mar-a-Lago resort since 2010. She was among several Mar-a-Lago members to be chosen by Trump for a role in his administration.

Marks stated that her primary goals include youth and women’s empowerment. During her first sixty days, Marks launched two major initiatives, to invite all of Africa's leaders to a U.S.-Africa investment summit in Washington D.C., and to lift South Africa into a top-20 U.S. trading partner.

=== Assassination attempt ===
In September 2020, anonymous U.S. intelligence sources alleged that Iran was planning an assassination attempt on Marks in South Africa. The plot, according to the sources, was in retaliation for the U.S. drone strike in Baghdad, Iraq, that killed the former commander of Qods Force, Qasem Soleimani, and deputy leader of Iraqi Popular Mobilization Forces militia, Abu Mahdi al-Muhandis on January 3, 2020.

The signing of a letter of intent between the U.S. International Development Finance Corporation (DFC) and NuScale, to develop 2,500 MW of nuclear power in South Africa, was cited as perhaps being one of her most significant accomplishments.

In March 2020, Marks refused to quarantine after being exposed to COVID-19 at an event at Mar-a-Lago, President Trump’s club in Florida. In December 2020, Marks spent 10 days in intensive care with Covid-19.

As a Trump political appointee ambassador, she resigned from the office following the inauguration of President Joe Biden on 20 January 2021 and was succeeded by John Groarke as Charge d'Affaires ad interim.

== Personal life ==
Marks has been married to Dr. Neville Marks, a practicing psychiatrist affiliated with JFK Medical Center, since 1976. Marks and her husband later lived in Bermuda before moving to Florida in 1987. She has two children.

Marks was a personal friend of Diana, Princess of Wales. According to Marks, the two women had planned a four-day trip to Italy for the end of August 1997. Marks canceled at the last minute when Marks's father had a heart attack. Diana went to Paris with her partner Dodi Fayed where they were killed in a car accident.

Since 2010, Marks has been a member of Mar-a-Lago. According to Marks, she joined because other country clubs in Palm Beach did not admit Jewish members.

Diplomatic posts
Preceded by Jessica Lapenn; Acting	United States Ambassador to South Africa; 2020–2021	Succeeded by John Groarke; Chargé d’Affaires ad interim
