= Patrick Gaspard =

American community activist and former diplomat

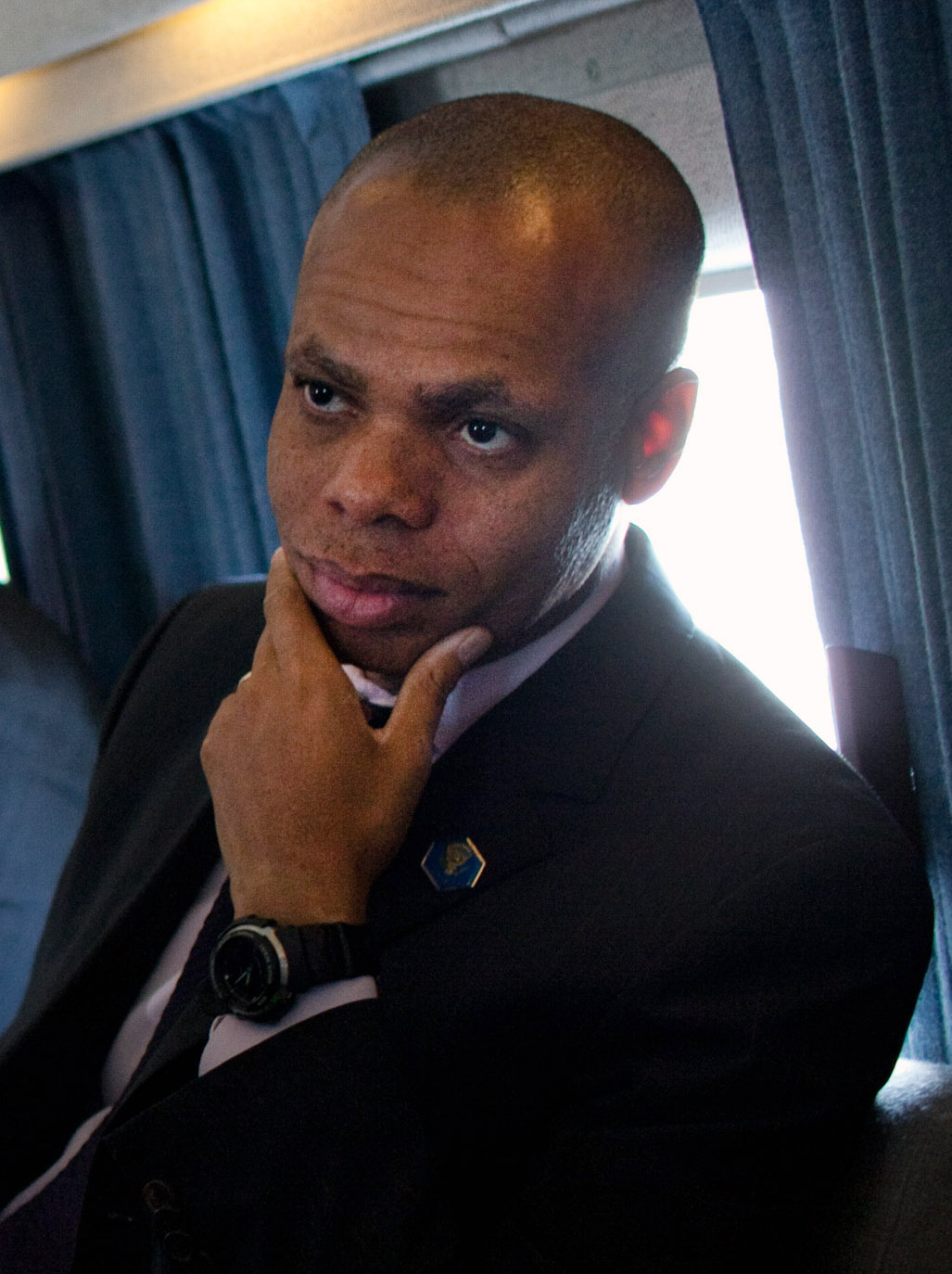
- Gaspard in 2010

United States Ambassador to South Africa
- In office October 16, 2013 – December 16, 2016
- President: Barack Obama
- Preceded by: Donald Gips
- Succeeded by: Jessica Lapenn (acting)

White House Director of Political Affairs
- In office January 20, 2009 – February 1, 2011
- President: Barack Obama
- Preceded by: Jonathan Felts
- Succeeded by: David Simas (2014)

Personal details
- Born: Patrick Hubert Gaspard; July 26, 1967 (age 59) Kinshasa, Congo-Kinshasa
- Party: Democratic
- Education: Columbia University (attended); School of Visual Arts (attended)

Patrick Hubert Gaspard (born July 26, 1967) is an American former diplomat who served as president of the Center for American Progress, a liberal think tank.

A noted Democratic Party leader and strategist, Gaspard served as executive director of the Democratic National Committee from 2011 to 2013. Gaspard served as United States Ambassador to South Africa from 2013 to 2016. Prior to his appointment to lead CAP, Gaspard served as president of the Open Society Foundations from 2017 to 2020.

== Early life ==
Patrick Hubert Gaspard was born in Kinshasa, Democratic Republic of Congo, to parents from Haiti. His parents had moved to Congo at the behest of revolutionary leader Patrice Lumumba, who urged French-speaking professionals to move to the country.

Gaspard moved with his parents to the United States when he was three years old, and he was raised in New York City. Gaspard graduated from Brooklyn Technical High School and attended Columbia University from 1984 to 1987.

== Career ==
=== New York City politics ===
Gaspard's political career began in New York City, where he worked on Jesse Jackson's 1988 presidential campaign. In the 1989 New York City mayoral election, Gaspard worked on David Dinkins' successful campaign.

Gaspard went on to serve as a special assistant in the Office of the Manhattan Borough President and as a special assistant in Dinkins' mayoral office. From 1998 to 1999, Gaspard was chief of staff to the New York City Council. After leaving city hall, Gaspard became an aide and advisor to Lower East Side councilwoman Margarita Lopez.

Gaspard was an advisor on Bill de Blasio's successful bid in the 2013 New York City mayoral election. Then-Public Advocate de Blasio personally thanked him in his primary victory speech, one of the few non-family members mentioned. In September 2013, he brokered peace between de Blasio and his primary rival Bill Thompson following a contentious contest.

=== National politics ===
From 2003 to 2004, he worked for Governor Howard Dean's 2004 presidential campaign as the National Deputy Field Director, and in 2004, was the National Field Director for America Coming Together. Gaspard spent nine years as the executive vice president for politics and legislation for the 1199SEIU United Healthcare Workers East labor union, the largest local union in America.

Gaspard initially rejected the opportunity to work on Barack Obama's presidential campaign in 2007 but later got the SEIU to endorse him. He officially joined the campaign as a political director in June 2008.

== Obama Administration and DNC ==
After Obama's election, he was named as Associate Personnel Director of President-elect Obama's transition team under Jim Messina. He was the Director of the White House Office of Political Affairs for the Obama administration from January 2009–11.

Gaspard served as the Executive Director of the Democratic National Committee from 2011–13, overseeing the party committee's efforts to re-elect President Obama.

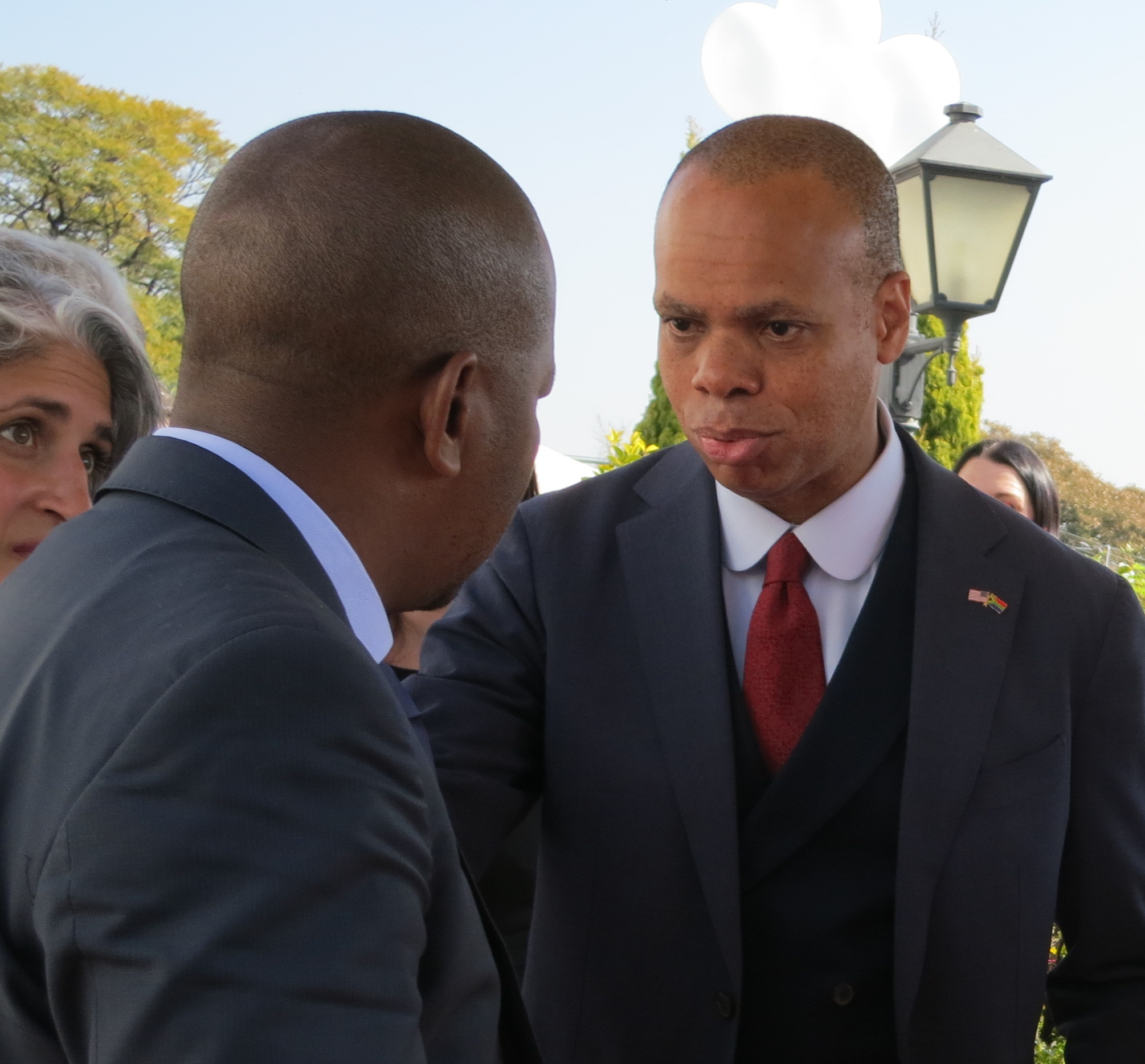
Ambassador Gaspard in 2014 with South Africa's Deputy Minister of Trade and Industry, Mzwandile Masina.

=== Ambassador to South Africa ===
It was leaked in March 2013 that President Obama was planning to nominate Gaspard to the post of United States Ambassador to South Africa. His Senate confirmation hearing was held on July 24, 2013, and he was sworn into the post on August 26, 2013. He served in this position until 2016.

As Ambassador to South Africa, Gaspard worked to strengthen civil society and worked in partnership with the South African government to develop the country’s healthcare infrastructure and land ownership mitigation and to support innovations in local governance. During his tenure, Gaspard worked to connect South African entrepreneurs to United States markets; develop clean, renewable, and efficient energy technologies; and to end wildlife trafficking. Gaspard has been credited with helping the Obama Administration redesign PEPFAR to more efficiently work within South Africa's healthcare system.

== Post-ambassadorship career ==
In September 2017, Gaspard replaced Chris Stone as president of the Open Society Foundations. Gaspard served in this capacity until December 2020, when he was replaced by Mark Malloch Brown, a British Lord, Baron, and diplomat. Following the 2020 presidential election, media outlets reported that Gaspard was under consideration for the role of Secretary of Labor. However, this position was instead filled by Boston Mayor Marty Walsh. In the early stages of the 2021 New York City mayoral election, Gaspard reportedly advised Maya Wiley on her campaign.

On June 30, 2021, liberal think tank Center for American Progress (CAP) announced that Gaspard would become its President and CEO, replacing Neera Tanden who left to become an advisor to Joe Biden. Politico described Gaspard's new role as "powerful," due to the Biden administration's close ties to CAP.

In May 2024, Gaspard defended the right of United States university students to protest the growing humanitarian crisis in Gaza during the Gaza war.

Gaspard was an adviser to the campaign of Scott Colom in the 2026 United States Senate election in Mississippi. Colom attributed the idea for the viral advertisement "Pick another protein" to Gaspard.

== Personal life ==
Gaspard is married and has two children. He is Catholic.

Gaspard is known for his love of poetry, and has cited poet and politician Aimé Césaire as a key inspiration. Gaspard is also an admirer of Russian poet Anna Akhmatova. Gaspard has reportedly taken part in acting and spoken word performances in his spare time.

Gaspard has received honorary doctorates from Columbia University (2018) and Bard College (2021).

Gaspard is a close friend of Bill de Blasio, the 109th Mayor of New York City. The pair met while working on David Dinkins' 1989 mayoral campaign, and bonded over their shared progressive political views and familial ties to the Caribbean: Gaspard's parents are from Haiti.

== Other activities ==
- Central European University (CEU), Member of the Board of Trustees
- Paris Peace Forum, Member of the Steering Committee

Political offices
Preceded by Johnathan Felts	White House Director of Political Affairs; 2009–2011	Vacant Title next held by David Simas; 2014
Diplomatic posts
Preceded by Donald Gips	United States Ambassador to South Africa; 2013–2016	Succeeded by Jessye Lapenn; Acting
Non-profit organization positions
Preceded by Christopher Stone	President of the Open Society Foundations; 2018–2020	Succeeded by Mark Malloch Brown
Preceded by Neera Tanden	President of the Center for American Progress; 2021–2025	Succeeded by Neera Tanden
