= Alan W. Eastham =

American diplomat

Alan Walter Eastham, Jr (born October 16, 1951 in Dumas, Arkansas) was the ambassador of the United States to the Republic of the Congo from 2008 until 2010. He was also Ambassador to Malawi from 2005 until 2008 and U.S. Consul General in Bordeaux, France beginning in 1994.

Born and raised in Dumas, Arkansas, he graduated from Hendrix College with a degree in philosophy and earned a Juris Doctor degree from the Georgetown University Law Center. He’s been a Senior Fellow in International Relations and International Programs at Hendrix.

Diplomatic posts
Preceded by Robert Weisberg (diplomat)	United States Ambassador to the Republic of the Congo; 2008 - 2010	Succeeded by Christopher W. Murray
