= United States Ambassador to the Congo =

United States Ambassador to the Congo may refer to:

- United States Ambassador to the Democratic Republic of the Congo (Congo-Kinshasa)
- United States Ambassador to the Republic of the Congo (Congo-Brazzaville)
