= Stephanie S. Sullivan =

American diplomat (born 1958)

Stephanie Sullivan
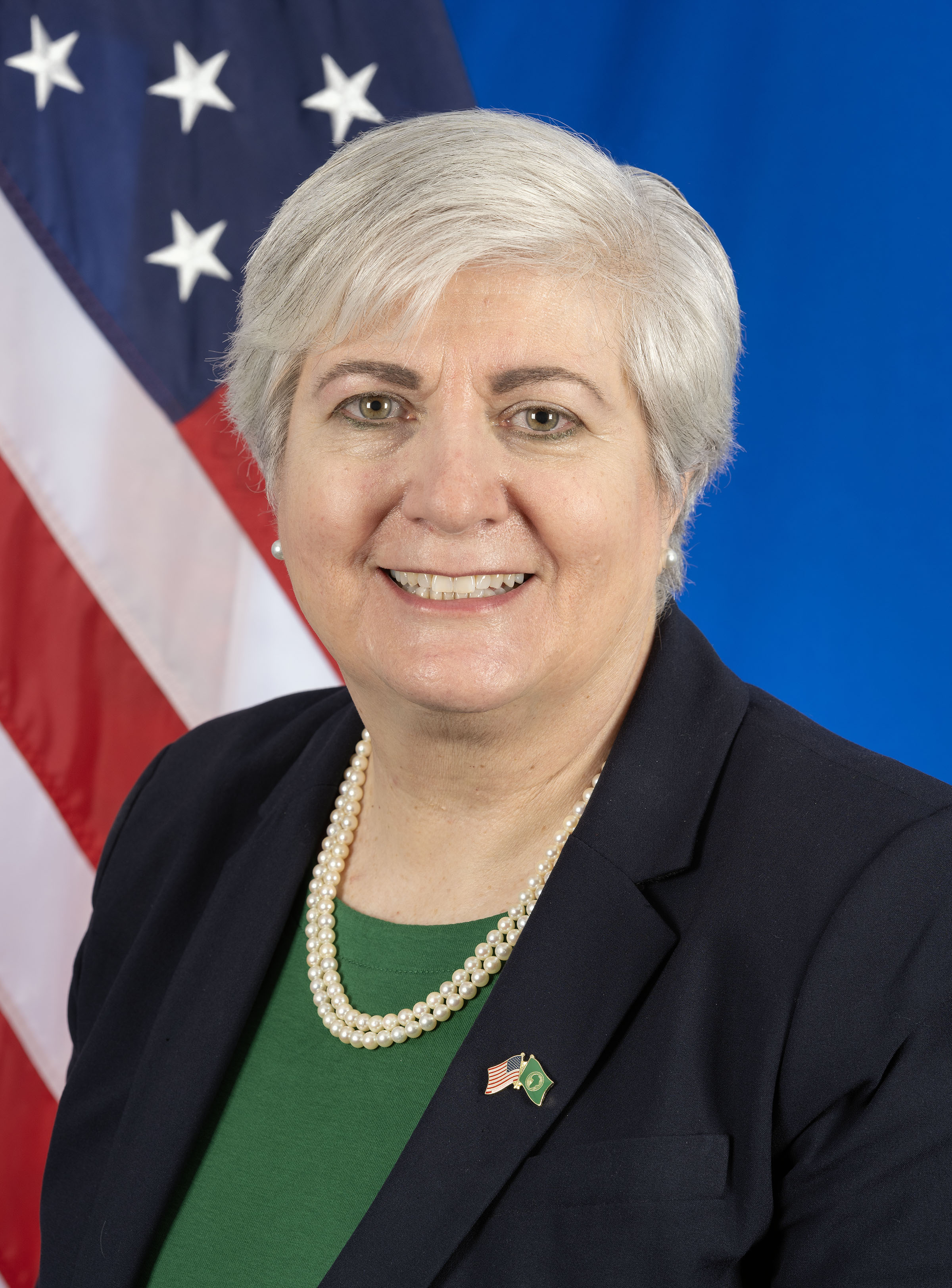

United States Ambassador to the African Union
- In office August 29, 2024 – December 30, 2025
- President: Joe Biden; Donald Trump
- Preceded by: Jessica Lapenn

United States Ambassador to Ghana
- In office January 23, 2019 – April 8, 2022
- President: Donald Trump; Joe Biden
- Preceded by: Robert P. Jackson
- Succeeded by: Virginia Palmer

Deputy Assistant Secretary of State for African Affairs
- In office January 2017 – October 2018
- President: Donald Trump
- Succeeded by: Geeta Pasi

United States Ambassador to the Republic of the Congo
- In office November 26, 2013 – January 20, 2017
- President: Barack Obama
- Preceded by: Christopher Murray
- Succeeded by: Todd Haskell

Personal details
- Born: September 27, 1958 (age 68) United States
- Spouse: John Sullivan
- Children: 2
- Education: Brown University; National Defense University

Stephanie Sanders Sullivan (née Sanders; born September 27, 1958) is an American diplomat who had served U.S. representative to the African Union. She previously served ambassador to Ghana. She served as Deputy Assistant Secretary for Central African Affairs and Security Affairs for the Bureau of African Affairs from January 2017 to November 2018. She previously served as United States Ambassador to the Republic of the Congo, having been nominated by President Obama on June 13, 2013, confirmed by the Senate on August 1, 2013, and served through January 20, 2017.

== Early life and education ==
Sullivan was born Stephanie Sanders, daughter of Dr. John E. Sanders, a geologist who taught at Yale University and Barnard College and his wife, Barbara Wood Sanders, an art teacher. Sullivan attended the Hackley School. As an undergraduate, Sullivan attended Brown University, where she majored in English language and literature and received the Francis Driscoll Premium Award from the Classics Department. She also excelled as a collegiate athlete. She played soccer and lacrosse all four years, and made All-Ivy teams in ice hockey, lacrosse and soccer. She graduated with a B.A. in 1980.

Sullivan later received an M.S. in security strategy from the National Defense University at the National War College.

== Career ==
Sullivan began her career with service in The Peace Corps, working in the Democratic Republic of Congo (then Zaire) from 1980 to 1983, teaching English in Mbanza Mboma. It was in the Peace Corps that she met her husband, John Sullivan, who was serving as a volunteer in Zaire.

When she embarked on a career as a U.S. diplomat, Sullivan returned to Africa, serving as a consular and political officer in Cameroon from 1986 to 1988. In 1988 she began the first of several tours with the Executive Secretariat Operations Center. Other assignments included serving as Chief of Operations for the Africa Region of Peace Corps from 1994 to 96, as well as a role as Political Chief at the U.S. Embassy in Ghana. Just before accepting the role as Ambassador, she served two years as Chief of Staff to the Deputy Secretary of State for Management and Resources.

=== Ambassador to Ghana ===
Sullivan was nominated to be the next ambassador to Ghana by President Donald Trump on July 9, 2018, and confirmed by the U.S. Senate on September 6, 2018. She presented her credentials to President Nana Addo Dankwa Akufo-Addo on January 23, 2019.

=== Representative to the African Union ===
On June 15, 2022, President Joe Biden nominated Sullivan to be the next US Representative to the African Union. Hearings on her nomination were held before the Senate Foreign Relations Committee on November 29, 2022. The committee favorably reported her nomination on December 7, 2022. Her nomination was not further acted upon for the rest of the year and was returned to Biden on January 3, 2023. President Biden renominated her the same day and her nomination was favorably reported out of committee on March 8, 2023, but it was once again returned to Biden on January 3, 2024. President Biden renominated her on January 11, 2024. Her nomination was favorably reported out of committee a third time on April 17, 2024, and was confirmed by the full Senate on June 20, 2024, by a 45–26 vote. She sworn on July 12, 2024. She arrived in Addis Ababa on August 8, 2024. She presented her credentials to Chairperson of the African Union Commission Moussa Faki on August 29, 2024.

== Personal life ==
Sullivan and her husband, John, have two sons. In addition to English, she speaks French, Spanish and Lingala.

Diplomatic posts
Preceded by Christopher Murray	United States Ambassador to the Republic of the Congo; 2013–2017	Succeeded by Todd Haskell
Preceded by Robert Jackson	United States Ambassador to Ghana; 2019–2022	Succeeded by Virginia E. Palmer
Preceded by Jessica Lapenn	United States Ambassador to the African Union; 2024–2025	
