= Wilton Blancké =

American diplomat and author

Wilton Wendell Blancké

1st United States Ambassador to Chad
- In office January 9, 1961 – May 28, 1961
- President: Dwight D. Eisenhower
- Preceded by: office established
- Succeeded by: Frederic L. Chapin (ad interim)

1st United States Ambassador to the Republic of the Congo
- In office December 23, 1960 – December 14, 1963
- President: Dwight D. Eisenhower
- Preceded by: office established
- Succeeded by: Henry L. T. Koren

1st United States Ambassador to Gabon
- In office January 13, 1961 – October 10, 1961
- President: Dwight D. Eisenhower
- Preceded by: office established
- Succeeded by: Charles Darlington

1st United States Ambassador to the Central African Republic
- In office January 6, 1961 – November 29, 1961
- President: Dwight D. Eisenhower
- Preceded by: office established
- Succeeded by: John H. Burns

Personal details
- Born: June 29, 1908 Philadelphia, Pennsylvania
- Died: 1971 (aged 63)
- Party: Nonpartisan
- Spouse: Frances Elizabeth Nichol
- Profession: Diplomat

Wilton Wendell Blancké (June 29, 1908 – 1971) was an American diplomat and author. He was the United States Ambassador to the Republic of the Congo (1960–1963), Central African Republic (1961), Chad (1961), and Gabon (1961) upon their independence, whilst resident at Brazzaville.

== Biography ==
W. Wendell Blancké was born in Philadelphia, Pennsylvania, on June 29, 1908, to Wilton Wallace Blancké and Cecil Whittier (Trout) Blancké. He later joined the U.S. Foreign Service and became a U.S. Consul in Hanoi, North Vietnam, in 1950. On February 13, 1952, Blancké married Frances Elizabeth Nichol. In 1955, he was assigned to serve as counselor to US Ambassador Charles W. Yost in Laos. From 1957 to 1960, he was the U.S. Consul General in Frankfurt, West Germany.

On November 9, 1960, Blancké was nominated by President Eisenhower to be the United States Ambassador to the newly independent nation of the Republic of the Congo, then to the Central African Republic, Chad, and Gabon on December 12, 1960. He was eventually superseded in these posts by 1963, and in 1969 wrote The Foreign Service of the United States, and in 1971 wrote he wrote Juarez of Mexico. He was a resident of California, and died in 1971 at about 63 years old.

Diplomatic posts
Preceded by none	United States Ambassador to Chad; 1961	Succeeded by Frederic L. Chapin (interim)
Preceded by none	United States Ambassador to Central African Republic; 1961	Succeeded by John H. Burns
Preceded by office established	United States Ambassador to Congo; 1960–1963	Succeeded by Henry L. T. Koren
Preceded by office established	United States Ambassador to Gabon; 1961	Succeeded by Charles Darlington
