= Todd P. Haskell =

American diplomat (born 1962)

Todd Philip Haskell
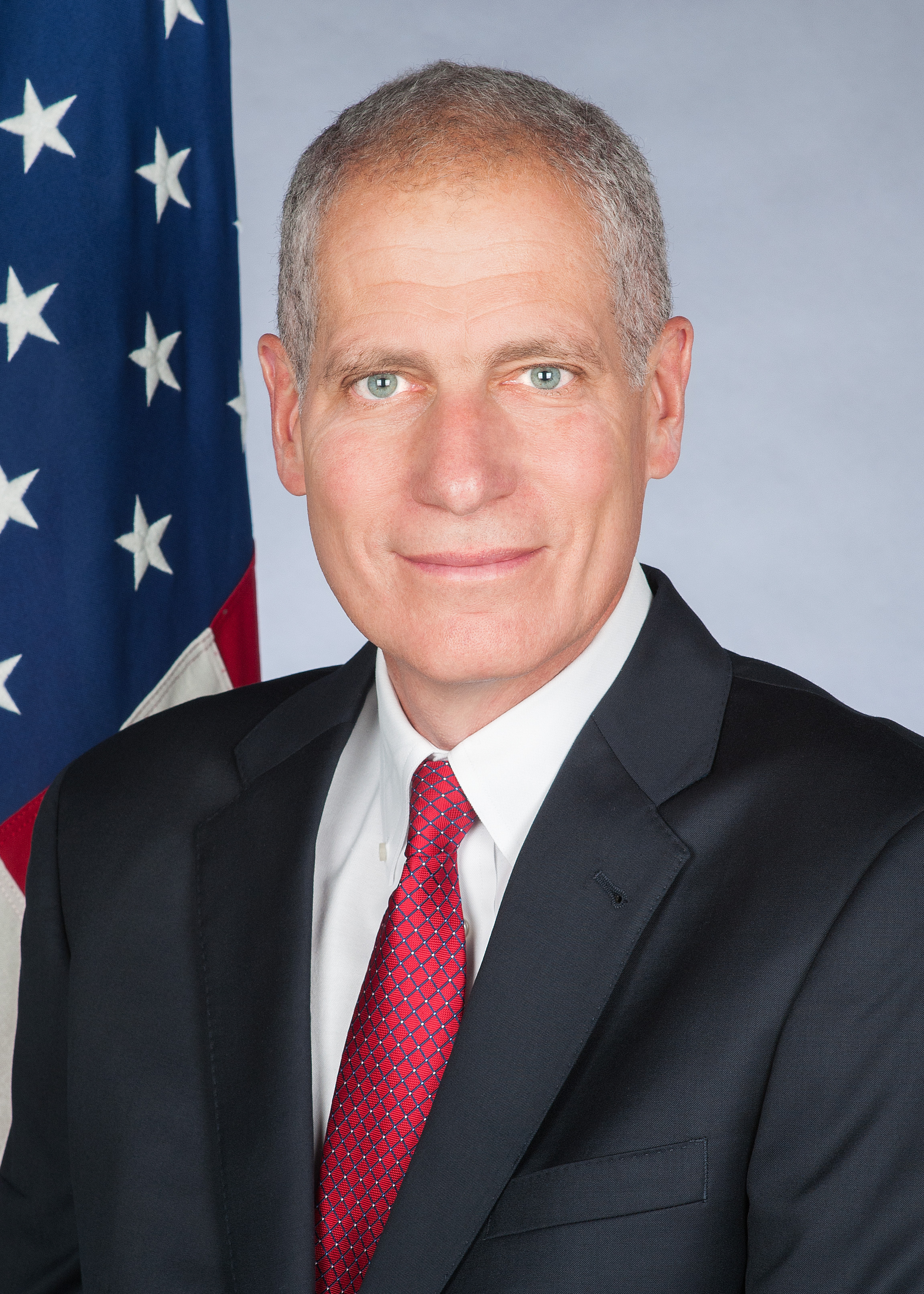

United States Ambassador to the Republic of the Congo
- In office July 13, 2017 – January 28, 2021
- President: Donald Trump; Joe Biden
- Preceded by: Stephanie S. Sullivan
- Succeeded by: Eugene S. Young

Deputy Assistant Secretary of State in the Bureau of African Affairs
- In office 2015–2017
- President: Barack Obama; Donald Trump

Personal details
- Born: 1962 (age 63–64) Hewlett Harbor, New York, U.S.
- Spouse: Jennifer
- Children: 3
- Education: Georgetown University

Todd Philip Haskell (born 1962) is an American diplomat and career Foreign Service Officer who previously served as the United States ambassador to the Republic of the Congo. He is currently the Consul General at the U.S. Consulate General in Cape Town, South Africa. Prior to assuming this position, he served as U.S. ambassador to the Republic of the Congo and before that, deputy assistant secretary in the Bureau of African Affairs at the United States Department of State from 2015 to 2017. In February 2017, President Donald Trump nominated Haskell for the position of U.S. ambassador to the Republic of the Congo. Haskell had originally been nominated for the position by outgoing President Barack Obama in January 2017. When Trump took office, he withdrew Haskell's nomination before reinstating his nomination. Haskell was confirmed for the position by the United States Senate on May 18, 2017.

Haskell has held diplomatic posts in Santo Domingo, Dominican Republic (2010–2013), Johannesburg, South Africa (2006–2010), Burkina Faso (2003–2006), Mexico City (2001–2003), Tel Aviv, Israel (1996–2000), Poznań, Poland (1992–1993), the Sinai Peninsula (1990–1991), Manila, Philippines (1988–1990), and Karachi, Pakistan (1986–1988). Haskell had served as Chargé d'Affaires ad interim South Africa from March 2021 to April 2022.

== Personal life ==
Raised in Hewlett Harbor, New York, Haskell graduated in 1980 from Lawrence High School and attended the Walsh School of Foreign Service at Georgetown University, from which he graduated in 1984.

Haskell speaks French, Spanish, and Hebrew. His home state is Florida.

Diplomatic posts
Preceded by Stephanie S. Sullivan	United States Ambassador to the Republic of the Congo; 2017–2022	Succeeded by Eugene S. Young
