= Robin R. Sanders =

American diplomat

Robin Renee Sanders
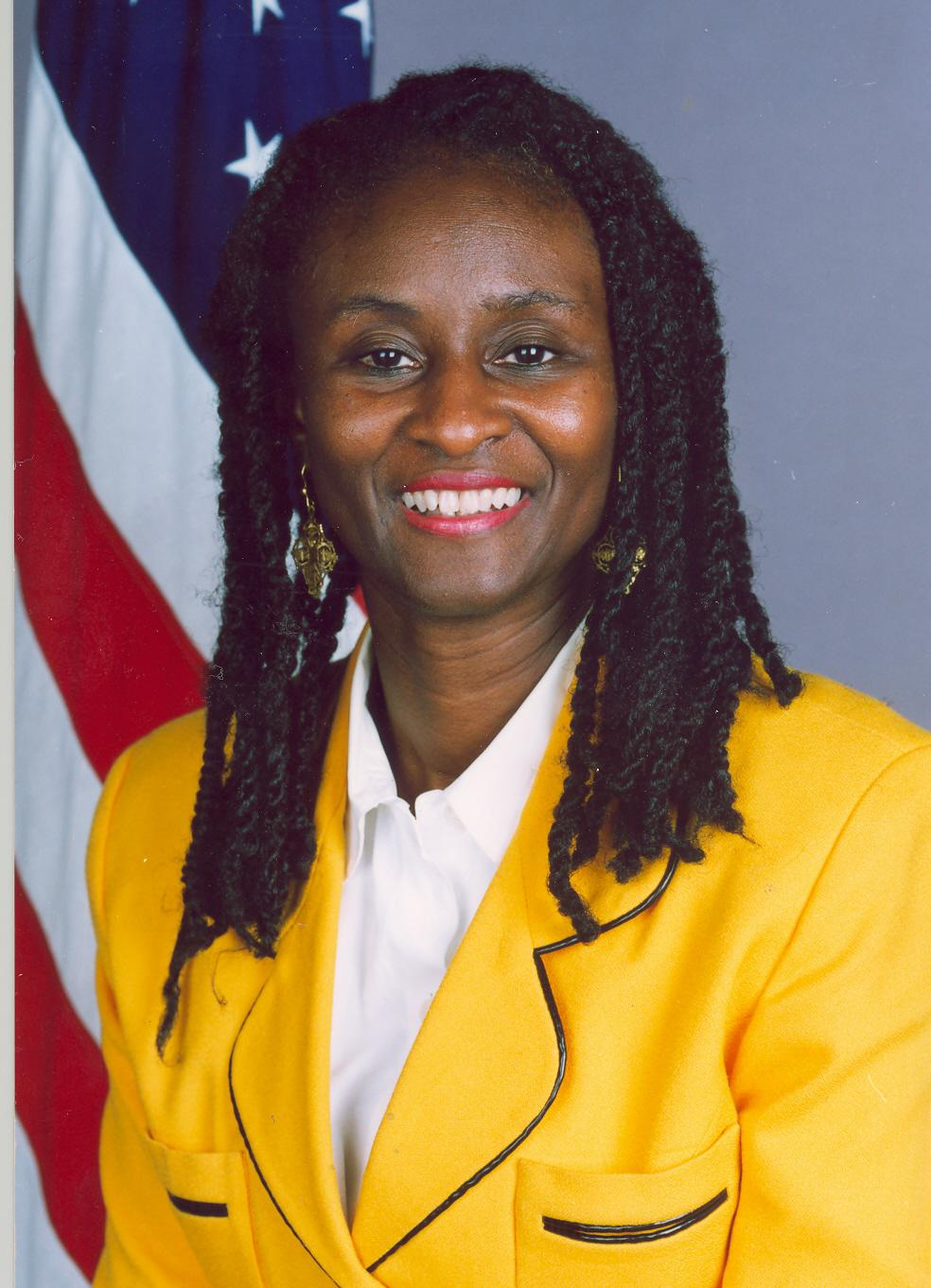

United States Ambassador to Republic of Congo
- In office February 13, 2003 – July 16, 2005
- President: George W. Bush
- Preceded by: David H. Kaeuper
- Succeeded by: Robert Weisberg

United States Ambassador to Nigeria
- In office October 29, 2007 – August 27, 2010
- President: George W. Bush; Barack Obama
- Preceded by: John Campbell
- Succeeded by: Terence McCulley

Personal details
- Born: 1954 (age 71–72)
- Education: Hampton University; Ohio University; Robert Morris University

Robin Renee Sanders (born 1954) is the former U.S. Ambassador to the Republic of the Congo (Congo-Brazzaville) from 2003 to 2005, and to Nigeria from 2007 to 2010. She is a 2010 D.Sc. graduate of Robert Morris University and served as Deputy Commandant at the Eisenhower Resource College at the National Defense University in Washington, D.C. She has received numerous awards for her work with and advocacy for African small businesses and African Diaspora issues, and six awards from the United States Department of State. She also served twice as the Director for Africa at the National Security Council at the White House, and received the medal of honor from the President of the Republic of Congo.

== Early life and education ==
Sanders was born in 1954 and received her Bachelor of Arts degree in Communications from Hampton University in Hampton, Virginia, and Master of Arts in International Relations and Africa Studies and a Master of Science in Communications from Ohio University in Athens, Ohio. She received her Doctorate degree in Information Systems and Communications from Robert Morris University.

Diplomatic posts
Preceded by David H. Kaeuper	United States Ambassador to the Republic of the Congo; November 15, 2002 – July 16, 2005	Succeeded by Robert Weisberg
Preceded by John Campbell	United States Ambassador to Nigeria; October 29, 2007 – August 27, 2010	Succeeded by Terence McCulley
