= Eugene S. Young =

American diplomat

Eugene Young
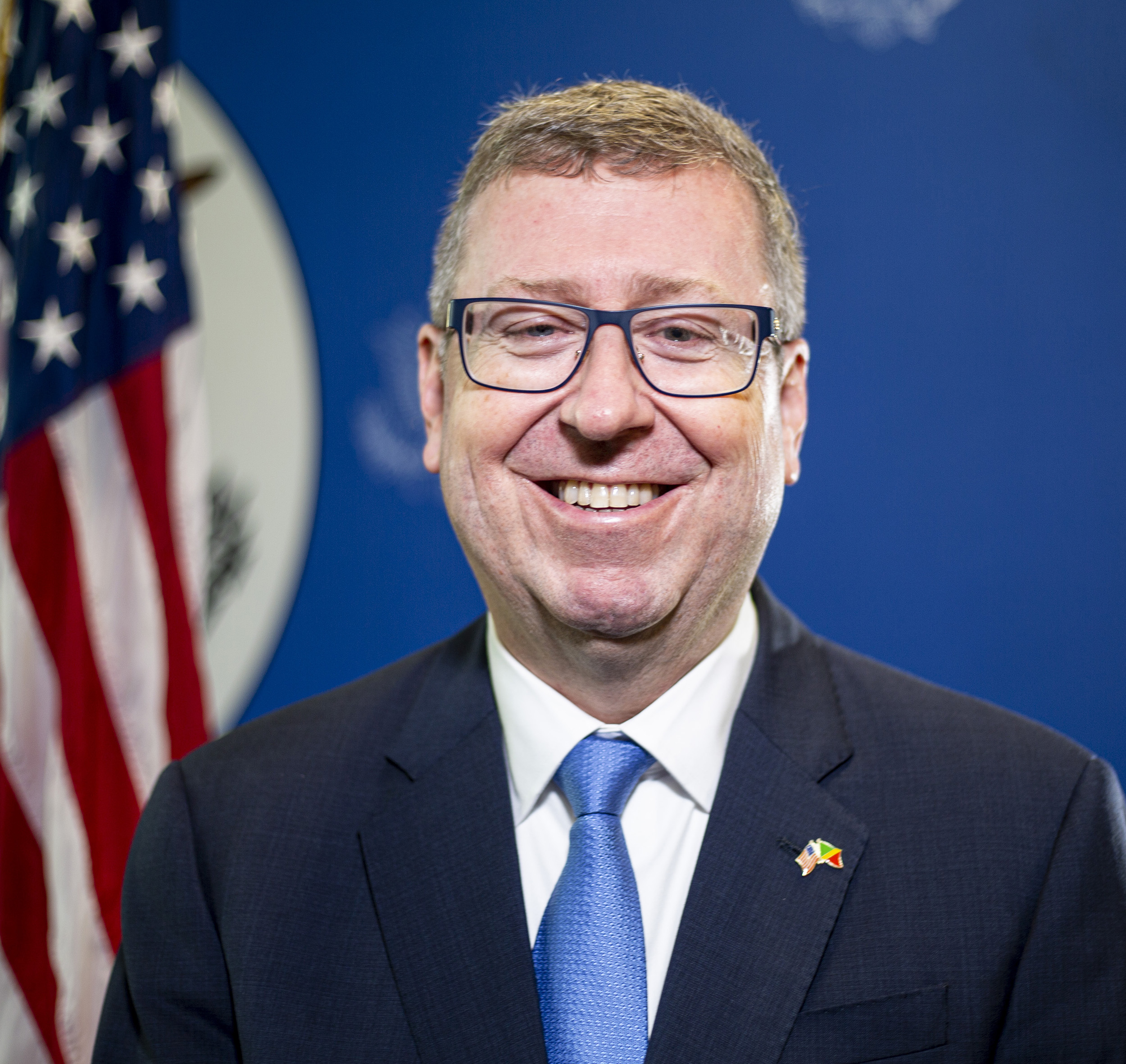

United States Ambassador to the Republic of the Congo
- In office March 30, 2022 – July 10, 2025
- President: Joe Biden; Donald Trump
- Preceded by: Todd Philip Haskell

Personal details
- Education: Miami University (BA); George Washington University (MA)

Eugene Stewart Young is an American diplomat who had served as the United States ambassador to the Republic of the Congo.

== Education ==
Raised in Lockport, New York, Young graduated from Lockport Senior High School in 1980. He earned his Bachelor of Arts in international studies from Miami University and a Master of Arts in international affairs from the Elliott School at George Washington University.

== Career ==
Young is a career member of the Senior Foreign Service. He was the Chargé d’Affaires and Deputy Chief of Mission of the U.S. embassy in Vienna, Austria; the Consul and Senior Civilian Representative of the U.S. Consulate in Herat, Afghanistan; and the Deputy Chief of Mission of the U.S. Embassy in Ljubljana, Slovenia. Among his other assignments, Young served as the economic counselor of the U.S. Embassy in Nairobi, Kenya, the Consul General of the U.S. Consulate General in Durban, South Africa, and as a Special Assistant in the Office of the Deputy Secretary of State. He is serving as the economic counselor of the U.S. Embassy in Jerusalem, Israel.

=== Ambassador to the Republic of the Congo ===
On April 15, 2021, President Joe Biden nominated Young to be the next United States Ambassador to the Republic of the Congo. The Senate Foreign Relations Committee held hearings on his nomination on June 9, 2021. The committee reported his nomination favorably on June 24, 2021. Young was confirmed on December 18, 2021, by the entire Senate via voice vote. He presented his credentials to President Denis Sassou N’Guesso on March 30, 2022.

== Personal life ==
Young speaks German, French, Slovene, Slovak, and Serbo-Croatian.

== See also ==
- Ambassadors of the United States

Diplomatic posts
Preceded by Todd Philip Haskell	United States Ambassador to the Republic of the Congo; 2022–present	Incumbent
