= Pick another protein =

2026 American political ad

External videos
- She done lost her damn mind.

"Pick another protein?" is a phrase from an American political advertisement produced by the campaign of Democratic nominee Scott Colom during his race against Republican incumbent Cindy Hyde-Smith in the 2026 United States Senate election in Mississippi.

The ad received significant coverage and praise from many political consultants, and is considered a primary reason for Colom's victory in the Senate race, which was considered a huge upset.

== History and content ==
Hyde-Smith at a Senate hearing in 2025.

On February 22, 2026, Hyde-Smith sat down in an interview with reporter Hugh Keeton on the Mississippi television station WLOX. When asked about the rising cost of beef and what Republicans were doing to get the cost of living under control, she replied:

"And you know, you have so many proteins to choose from. And all commodities go through peaks and valleys. It is a global market, but we will be seeing a difference, I truly believe, because of so many things."

Hyde-Smith's statement was made in the context of nationally rising beef prices, as well as the United States affordability crisis; Colom's campaign advertisements frequently featured slogans about lowering costs and accusations of Hyde-Smith being at fault for the high prices, with Colom calling her "Cindy High Prices" as a play on her name. Political commentators have compared Hyde-Smith's remark to "Let them eat cake".

The 28-second ad was created in response to the remarks, with Colom attributing the idea for the ad to adviser Patrick Gaspard, who suggested the campaign take Hyde-Smith's "inexcusable gaffe and do something edgy with it that could get attention." The video was created by Ryan Sayles, a 27-year-old videographer and content creator who had never previously worked on a political campaign. Its script was written by Colom, his twin brother Andrew, and his campaign manager Gerard Henderson. Sayles filmed the ad in three hours and edited it in about four.

The ad, which begins with a television clip of Hyde-Smith's quote, features everyday Mississippians reacting with incredulity. The ad was filmed in Jackson, Mississippi. The first scene, featuring Army veteran and friend of Colom's family Russ Hudson grilling burgers in Colom's parents' backyard, was noted for Hudson's sudden head tilt and deadpan Southern drawl while saying "shee-it". The second reactant says, "Pick another protein? She done lost her damn mind. I'd rather pick another senator", forming the title of the video upload. The other respondents in the ad react similarly. The ad features a sample from "Rapper's Delight" by the Sugarhill Gang. Colom posted the ad to social media on October 13, 2026.

== Reactions ==
Supporters of Colom wearing "pick another senator instead" shirts

The low-budget advertisement created widespread online attention, garnering 2.8 million views in 36 hours, and spawned local merchandise and a "pick another protein" taco truck tour. The ad was widely credited by political commentators as a defining moment of the 2026 midterm elections, while using more humor than a typical attack ad.

After the ad began circulating, Keeton brought it up in another interview with Hyde-Smith: "The last time you were here, I asked you a question about beef prices, and since that time your opponent has used part of your quote in there in ads that have been widely circulated." Hyde-Smith responded: "when mothers want to feed their families, you go out shopping, there are proteins — you wanna feed meat — there are some cheaper prices, and, uh, that’s what that statement was about." The Democratic Senatorial Campaign Committee criticized Hyde-Smith for "doubl[ing] down" on her original statement.

The ad helped propel Colom to an upset victory in November 2026, making him the first Democrat elected to the U.S. Senate from Mississippi since 1982 and the state's first Black senator since Reconstruction. In a New York Times opinion piece hailing Colom's victory, author and former member of the Mississippi House of Representatives John Grisham brought up the ad as an example of how Colom's "ads resonated with the younger crowd," calling it a "viral sensation."

Placards at Colom's victory speech echoed the slogan as "Picked another Senator". Newsweek described it as one of the greatest political advertisements. Nate Silver described it as "one of the most effective pieces of political communication I can remember, not just because it's legitimately funny but also because it provides a permission structure: picking another senator instead is no big deal."
