= Charles Darlington =

American diplomat and economist

Charles Francis Darlington
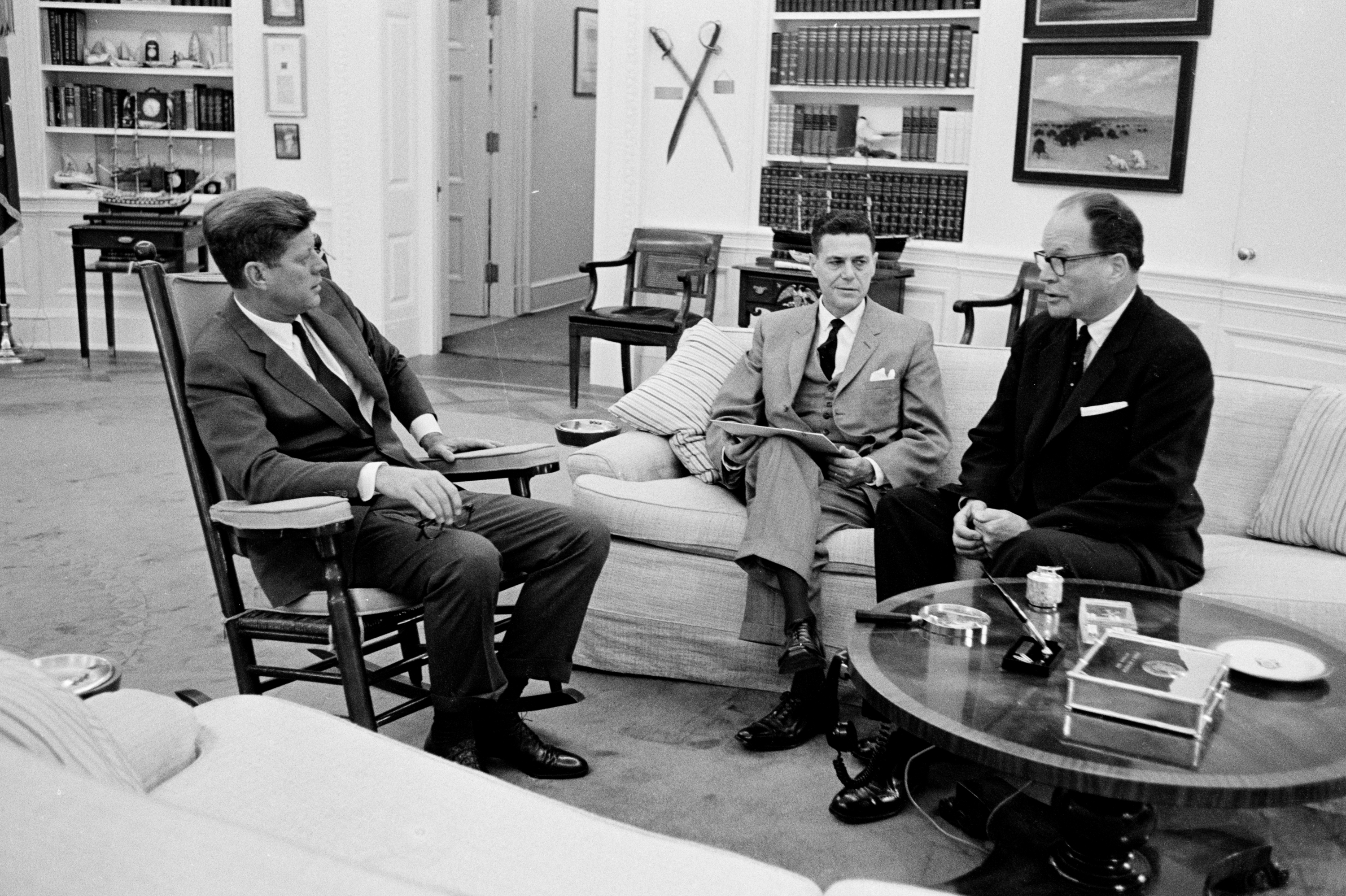
- Darlington meeting with President John F. Kennedy and Thomas S. Estes on November 21, 1963

United States Ambassador to Gabon
- In office October 18, 1961 – July 26, 1964
- President: John F. Kennedy
- Preceded by: W. Wendell Blancke
- Succeeded by: David Bane

Personal details
- Born: September 13, 1904 New York, New York
- Died: April 11, 1986 (aged 81) New York, New York
- Occupation: Diplomat and economist

Military service
- Allegiance: United States
- Branch/service: Navy
- Rank: Lieutenant commander
- Battles/wars: World War II

Charles Francis Darlington, Jr. (September 13, 1904 – April 11, 1986) was an American diplomat and economist. He was United States Ambassador to Gabon from 1961 to 1964. Darlington was ambassador to Gabon during the 1964 coup d'état. He published books on his experiences in Africa including African Betrayal (1968).

== Early life and career ==
Darlington was born September 13, 1904, in Manhattan. He earned an undergraduate degree from Harvard University and traveled overseas to pursue graduate studies at Oxford University and the University of Geneva.

Darlington served as a gold expert in the economic and financial section at the League of Nations headquarters in Geneva, Switzerland, from 1928 to 1931. Shortly after, he worked at the Bank for International Settlements in Basel. Upon returning to the US in 1935, Darlington served the State Department as assistant chief of the Division of Trade Agreements until 1939. He then served as foreign exchange manager for the General Motors Overseas Corporation until 1942.

During World War II, Darlington saw action in North Africa and Italy, as a lieutenant commander in the Navy. After the war, he spent 15 years as an international oil executive. Darlington was named Ambassador to Gabon by President Kennedy in 1961 and served in the post for four years.

He was a part of JFK's last official White House meeting on November 21, 1963.

Diplomatic posts
Preceded by W. Wendell Blancke	United States Ambassador to Gabon; 1961–1964	Succeeded by David Bane
