= Mary Beth Leonard =

American diplomat (born 1962)

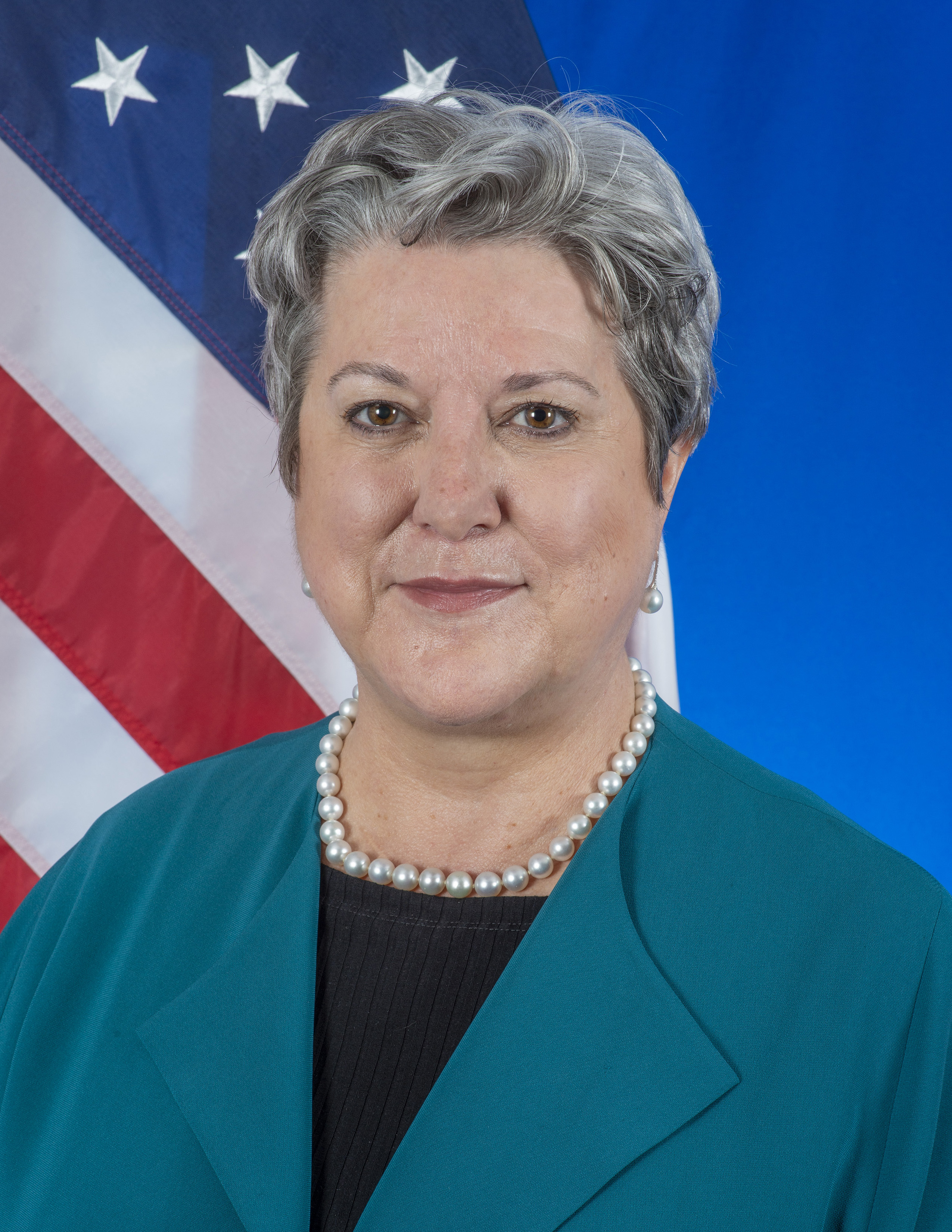

United States Ambassador to Nigeria
- In office December 24, 2019 – March 31, 2023
- President: Donald Trump; Joe Biden
- Preceded by: W. Stuart Symington
- Succeeded by: Richard M. Mills Jr.

United States Ambassador to the African Union
- In office September 13, 2016 – September 14, 2019
- President: Barack Obama; Donald Trump
- Preceded by: Reuben E. Brigety II
- Succeeded by: Jessica Lapenn

United States Ambassador to Mali
- In office November 22, 2011 – September 22, 2014
- President: Barack Obama
- Preceded by: Gillian Milovanovic
- Succeeded by: Paul Folmsbee

Personal details
- Born: 1962 (age 63–64)
- Education: Boston University (B.A.); Johns Hopkins University School of Advanced International Studies (M.A.)

Mary Beth Leonard (born 1962) is an American diplomat. She was the United States Ambassador to Nigeria and the former U.S. Representative to the African Union. Previously, she served as the United States Ambassador to Mali from 2011 to 2014.

== Early life ==
Leonard is a native of Massachusetts. Leonard's father is Earl Leonard, a math teacher and vice principal. Leonard graduated from Doherty Memorial High School in Worcester, Massachusetts.

== Education ==
Leonard graduated magna cum laude with a Bachelor of Arts from Boston University, with a major in economics and a minor in French. In 1988, Leonard earned a master's degree in international relations, with an emphasis on African studies, from the Johns Hopkins University School of Advanced International Studies. In 2004, Leonard received a Master's of Security and Strategic Studies from the Naval War College, with distinction.

She speaks English, French, Spanish, Afrikaans, and Dutch.

== Career ==
Leonard began her career in the Defense Department as a research analyst.

In 1988, Leonard joined the State Department and entered the Foreign Service. Leonard has served overseas as an economic and consular officer in Yaoundé, Cameroon; Windhoek, Namibia; and Lomé, Togo. Leonard also worked in the Department's Operations Center and in its Office of Central African Affairs. Leonard then served as a political and economic officer in Cape Town, South Africa and thereafter as Deputy Chief of Mission in Paramaribo, Suriname.

From 2006 to 2009, Leonard was Deputy Chief of Mission in Bamako, Mali. From 2009 to 2011, Leonard was the Director for West African Affairs at the U.S. Department of State.

On June 21, 2011, Leonard was nominated and confirmed on October 18, 2011, as the U.S. Ambassador to the Republic of Mali. Leonard's term ended in 2014. Leonard's service in Mali was recognized with the Department's Diplomacy for Human Rights Award in 2013, an honor that annually recognizes a U.S. Chief of Mission who has demonstrated extraordinary commitment to defending human rights and advancing democratic principles in his or her host country. In September 2014, Leonard was a State Department's Diplomat in Residence for New England, based at Tufts University. Leonard served as the State Department's Senior Faculty Advisor at the U.S. Naval War College in Newport, Rhode Island.

Leonard was appointed by President Obama as the Representative of the United States of America to the African Union, with the rank and status of Ambassador Extraordinary and Plenipotentiary, on July 5, 2016. She also served as U.S. Permanent Representative to the United Nations Economic Commission for Africa (UNECA).

On June 24, 2019, President Trump appointed her to become the U.S. Ambassador to Nigeria and on August 1, 2019, the Senate confirmed her nomination by voice vote. Leonard was sworn in on October 4, 2019, and presented her credentials to President Muhammadu Buhari on December 24, 2019.

== Personal life ==
Leonard speaks French, Spanish, Afrikaans, and Dutch.

Diplomatic posts
Preceded by Gillian Milovanovic	United States Ambassador to Mali; 2011–2014	Succeeded by Paul Folmsbee
Preceded by Reuben E. Brigety II	United States Ambassador to the African Union; 2016–2019	Succeeded by Jessica Lapenn
Preceded by W. Stuart Symington	United States Ambassador to Nigeria; 2019–2023	Succeeded by Richard M. Mills Jr.
