= Reuben Brigety =

American diplomat and academic (born 1973)

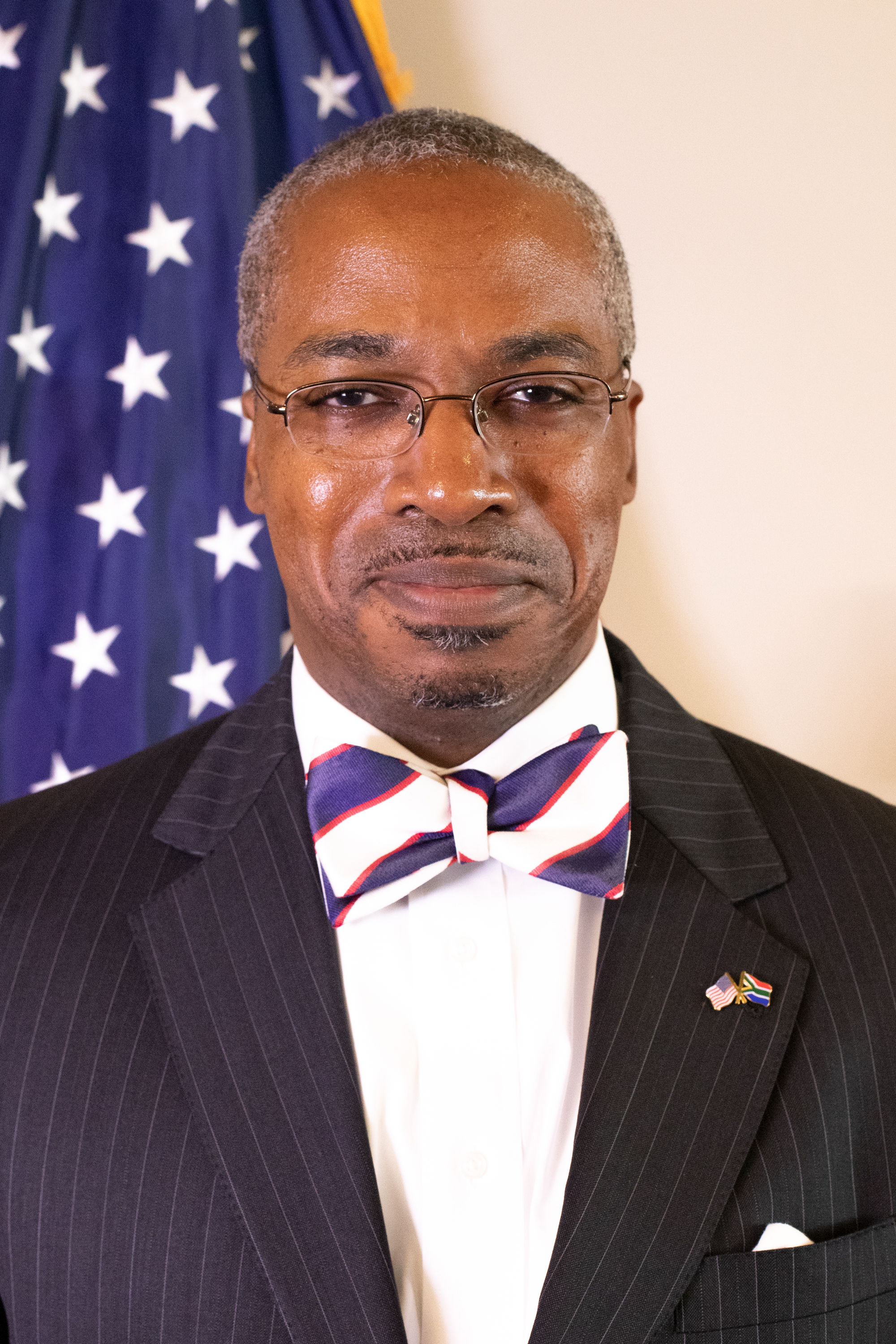

United States Ambassador to South Africa
- In office August 11, 2022 – January 3, 2025
- President: Joe Biden
- Preceded by: Lana Marks
- Succeeded by: L. Brent Bozell III

Vice-Chancellor and President of Sewanee: The University of the South
- In office June 17, 2020 – December 21, 2021
- Preceded by: John McCardell Jr.

Dean of the Elliott School of International Affairs at the George Washington University
- In office October 1, 2015 – May 30, 2020
- Succeeded by: Alyssa Ayres

United States Ambassador to the African Union
- In office October 7, 2013 – September 24, 2015
- President: Barack Obama
- Preceded by: Michael Battle
- Succeeded by: Mary Beth Leonard

Deputy Assistant Secretary of State for African Affairs
- In office November 14, 2011 – September 3, 2013
- President: Barack Obama
- Secretary: Johnnie Carson; Donald Yamamoto; Linda Thomas-Greenfield

Personal details
- Born: Reuben E. Brigety II; September 7, 1973 (age 53) Jacksonville, Florida, U.S.
- Spouse: Leelie Selassie
- Education: United States Naval Academy (BS); Cambridge University (MA, PhD)

Military service
- Branch/service: United States Navy

Reuben Earl Brigety II (born September 7, 1973) is an American diplomat and academic who served as the United States ambassador to South Africa. He was the vice-chancellor and president of the University of the South, in Sewanee, Tennessee, from 2020 to 2021. Previously, Brigety served as dean of the Elliott School of International Affairs at George Washington University. Prior to that, Brigety served as United States ambassador to the African Union, as a deputy assistant secretary of state, and as permanent representative to the United Nations Economic Commission for Africa.

== Early life and education ==
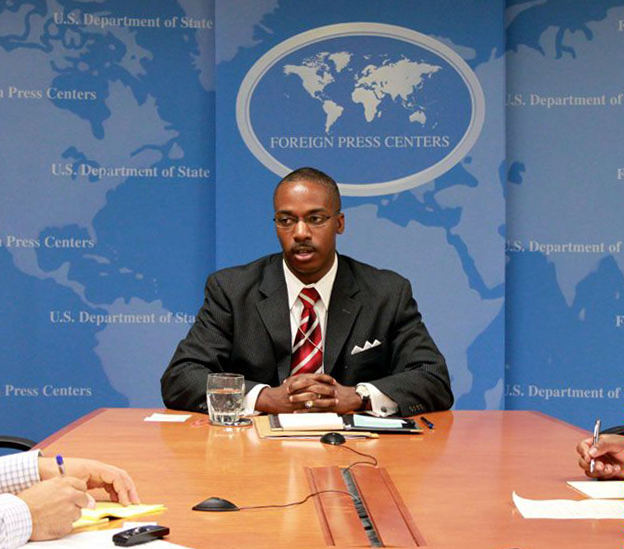
Brigety speaking at the Washington Foreign Press Center, 2010.

A native of Jacksonville, Florida, Brigety is the son of Reuben Brigety, a physician, and Barbara Brigety, an educator and school administrator. He graduated from Sandalwood High School as the salutatorian. He applied to the United States Naval Academy and was appointed there as part of the Class of 1995. During his senior year at the academy, he served as one of three Midshipman Brigade Commanders. He earned a Bachelor of Science in political science and graduated as a Distinguished Naval Graduate.

After graduation, he served in The Pentagon. Through the Thomas G. Pownall Scholarship awarded to him by the Naval Academy Alumni Association, he spent three years at the University of Cambridge where he obtained a Master of Philosophy in international relations. Brigety then served as an active duty U.S. naval officer and entered training to be a submarine officer. He returned to study at Cambridge and earned Doctor of Philosophy in international relations.

== Career ==
From August 2003 to April 2009, Brigety was as an assistant professor of government and politics at George Mason University and at the American University School of International Service. In addition, he was a researcher with the Arms Division of Human Rights Watch from August 2001 through May 2003, conducting research missions in Afghanistan and Iraq.

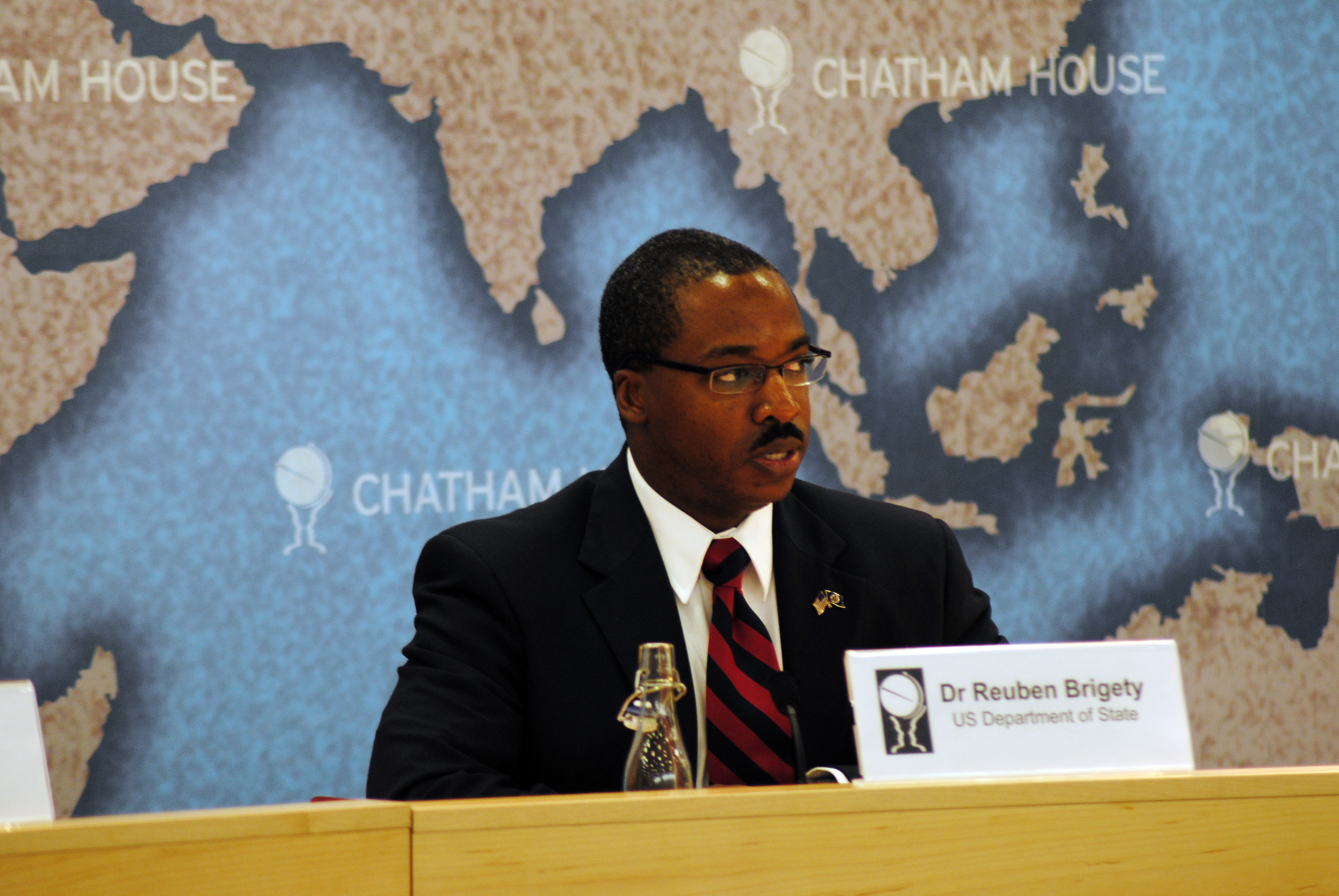
Brigety speaking at Chatham House: The Royal Institute of International Affairs, London.

From January 2007 to January 2008, Brigety served as a special assistant in the Bureau for Democracy, Conflict, and Humanitarian Assistance at the United States Agency for International Development. From January 2008 to November 2009, he served as director of the Sustainable Security Program at the Center for American Progress. From November 2008 to January 2009, he also served as a senior advisor for Development and Security to the U.S. Central Command Assessment Team in Washington and in Doha, Qatar.

From December 2009 to November 2011, he served as deputy assistant secretary of state in the Bureau of Population, Refugees, and Migration. In this capacity, he supervised U.S. refugee programs in Africa, managed U.S. humanitarian diplomacy with major international partners, and oversaw the development of international migration policy.

Brigety was appointed deputy assistant secretary of state in the Bureau of African Affairs on November 14, 2011, with responsibility for Southern African and Regional Security Affairs, and served in that capacity until June, 2013. From September 3, 2013 to August 1, 2015, he served as the appointed Representative of the United States of America to the African Union and Permanent Representative of the United States to the UN Economic Commission for Africa.

In August 2015, the George Washington University announced they had selected Ambassador Brigety for the dean of the Elliott School of International Affairs. He began serving in that capacity on October 1, 2015.

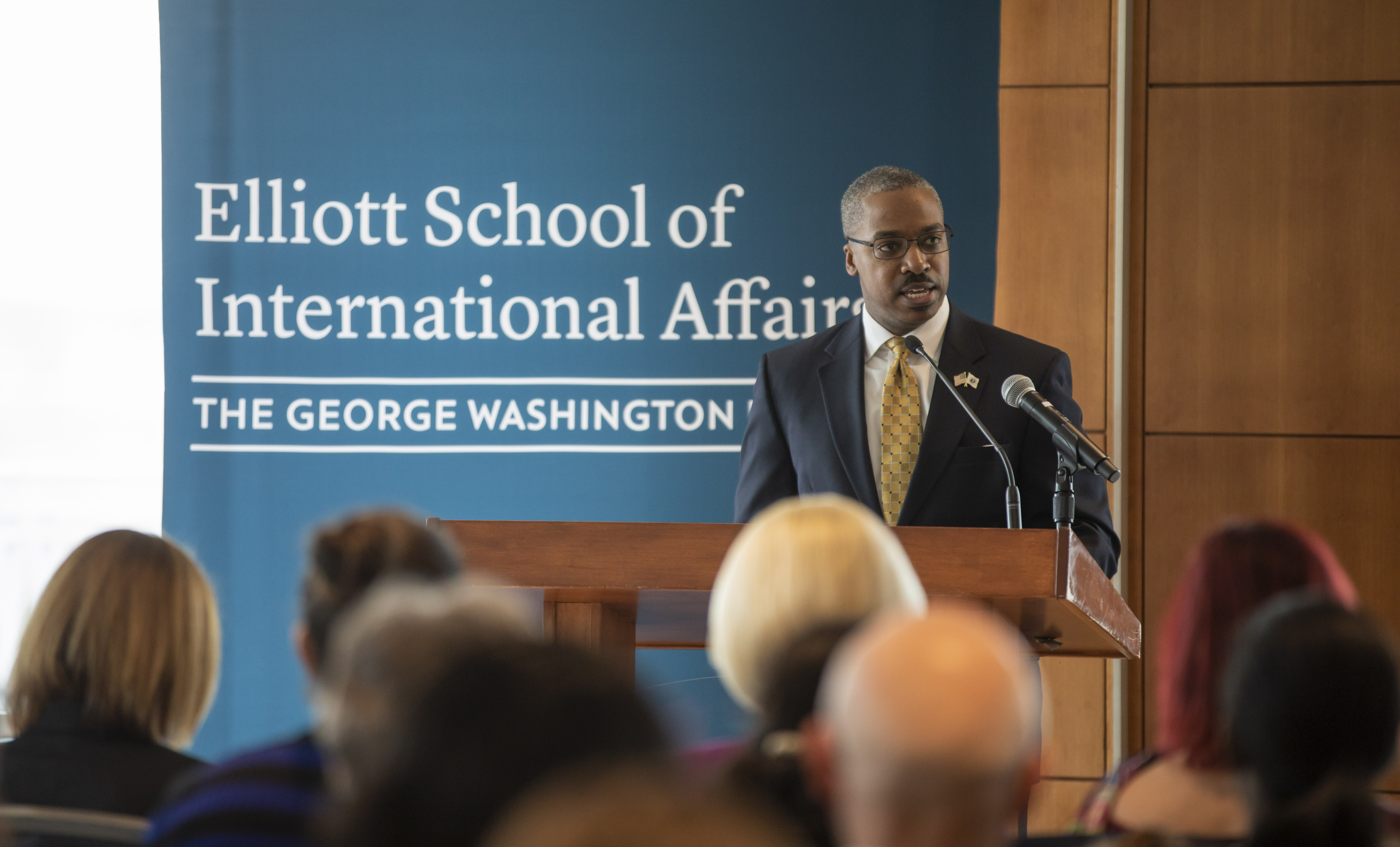
Brigety speaking at Elliott School of International Affairs in March 2019

Brigety is a member of the International Institute for Strategic Studies, a life member of the Council on Foreign Relations, and a recipient of the council's International Affairs Fellowship.

=== Time at Sewanee ===
On February 28, 2020, he was announced as the next vice-chancellor and president of Sewanee: The University of the South, a position he began on June 17, 2020. (The vice-chancellor is Sewanee's chief academic officer, on the British model of higher education.) In one of his first actions as vice-chancellor, Brigety proposed new enforcement measures which were more consistent with the university's drug policy. This policy was announced alongside Brigety's four themes for what he deemed a "year of discernment." These themes are achieving national preeminence in academics, strengthening commitment to equality and inclusion, increased focus on global citizenship, and the economic development of the Domain to increase amenities.

Brigety was the first African American to serve as Sewanee's vice-chancellor, at a time when its student body was only 4% Black. He faced significant opposition from some students for his tough approach to campus discipline and pandemic-related health policies, including repeated vandalism of his home. On February 7, 2021, Brigety gave a speech in the campus chapel in which he described the vandalism, adding, "The sanctity, the security and the dignity of my family are inviolate, and we are not leaving." In March 2021, a group of Sewanee students was ordered to leave a men's lacrosse game against Emmanuel College for yelling racial epithets at non-white players on Emmanuel's team.

=== United States ambassador to South Africa ===
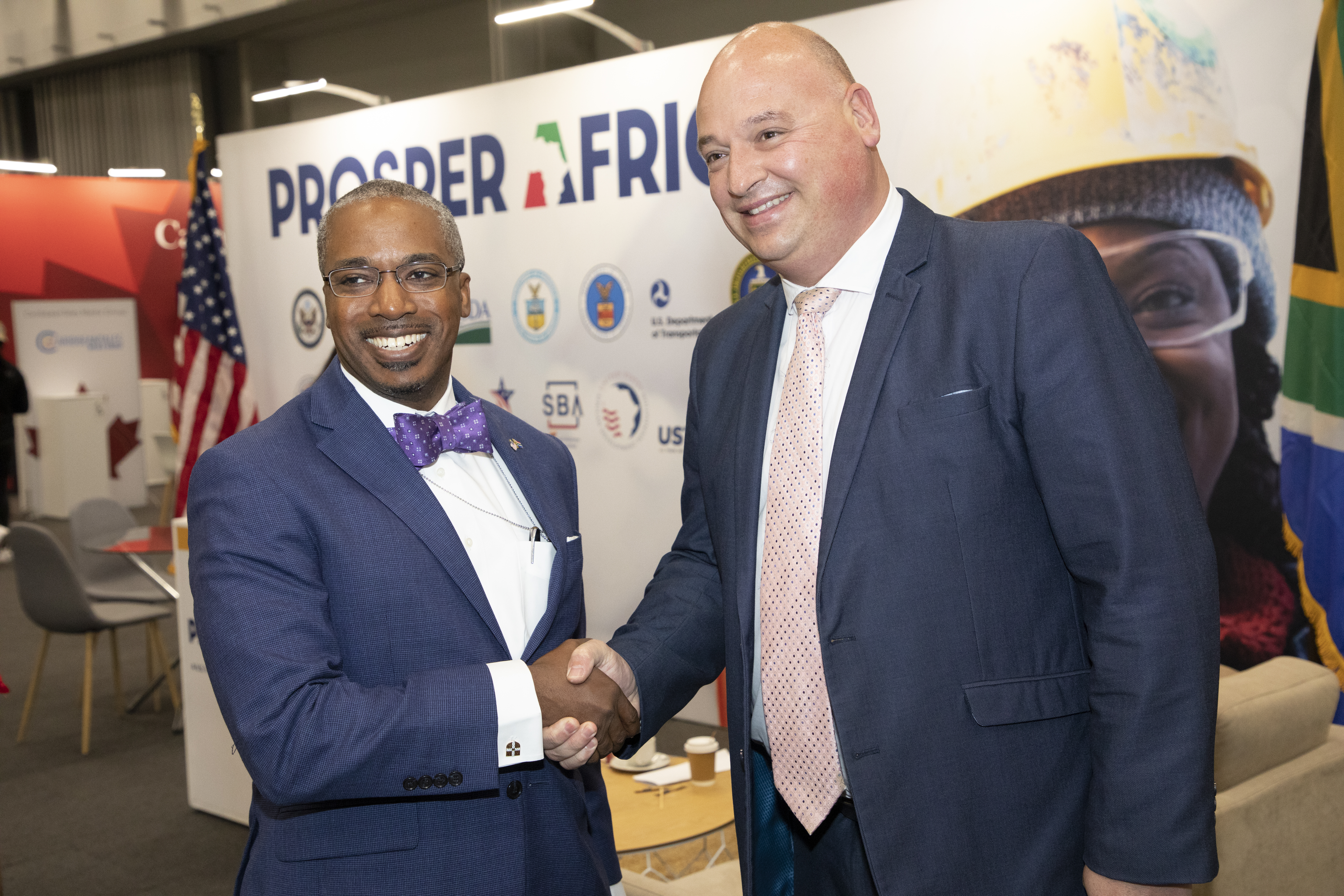
Brigety with South African politician James Vos

On December 1, 2021, Brigety announced his resignation from Sewanee, effective December 21. Brigety stated his resignation was due to uncertainty surrounding a possible nomination to be the ambassador to South Africa. He was nominated for the post on February 4, 2022. Hearings were held on his nomination before the Senate Foreign Relations Committee on May 24, 2022. The committee favorably reported his nomination to the Senate floor on June 23, 2022. Brigety was confirmed by the Senate on July 21, 2022 by a 55–40 vote. He presented his credentials to President Cyril Ramaphosa on August 11, 2022.

In May 2023, Brigety accused South Africa of supplying arms to Russia during the December 2022 docking of the Russian cargo ship named Lady R. South Africa denied the allegation and claimed that Brigety later apologized for the statement. That comment led South Africa's foreign ministry to summon Brigety and created tension between the United States, South Africa, and Russia. On May 28, 2023, South Africa announced that they would be launching an investigation into the allegations. On June 1, Politico reported that "The Biden administration is furious with its ambassador to South Africa and scrambling to salvage relations with the country after the envoy alleged that Pretoria sent a ship filled with weapons to Russia as it wages war on Ukraine. The ambassador, Reuben Brigety, made the claim three weeks ago in a press briefing, saying he'd "bet my life" on it. He added that South Africa was engaging in "outrageous" anti-Americanism and questioned its claim to be neutral among the world powers..."

== Personal life ==
Brigety speaks Spanish, French, and Amharic.

== Bibliography ==
- Brigety, Reuben E. (2016). "The New Pan-Africanism: Implications for US Africa Policy". Survival. 58 (4): 159–176. doi:10.1080/00396338.2016.1186985. S2CID 156964424.
- Swords and Ploughshares; Sustainable Security in Afghanistan Requires Sweeping U.S. Policy Overhaul (PDF). Center for American Progress. March 2009.
- Ethics/ Technology and the American Way of War: Cruise Missiles and U.S. Security Policy. London: Routledge. 2007. ISBN 9781135986117.
- "Just War Theory and Child Soldiers". Rethinking the Just War Tradition. Albany, NY: State University of New York Press. 2007. pp. 131–147. ISBN 9780791471562.
- "Caring for Carthage: Humanity as a Weapon of War" (PDF). PRAXIS: The Fletcher Journal of Human Security. XXI: 88–98. 2006.

== Attribution ==
This article incorporates public domain material from the U.S. Department of State

Diplomatic posts
Preceded by Lana Marks	United States Ambassador to South Africa; 2022–2025	Succeeded by L. Brent Bozell III
