= Robert Weisberg (diplomat) =

American diplomat (born 1950)

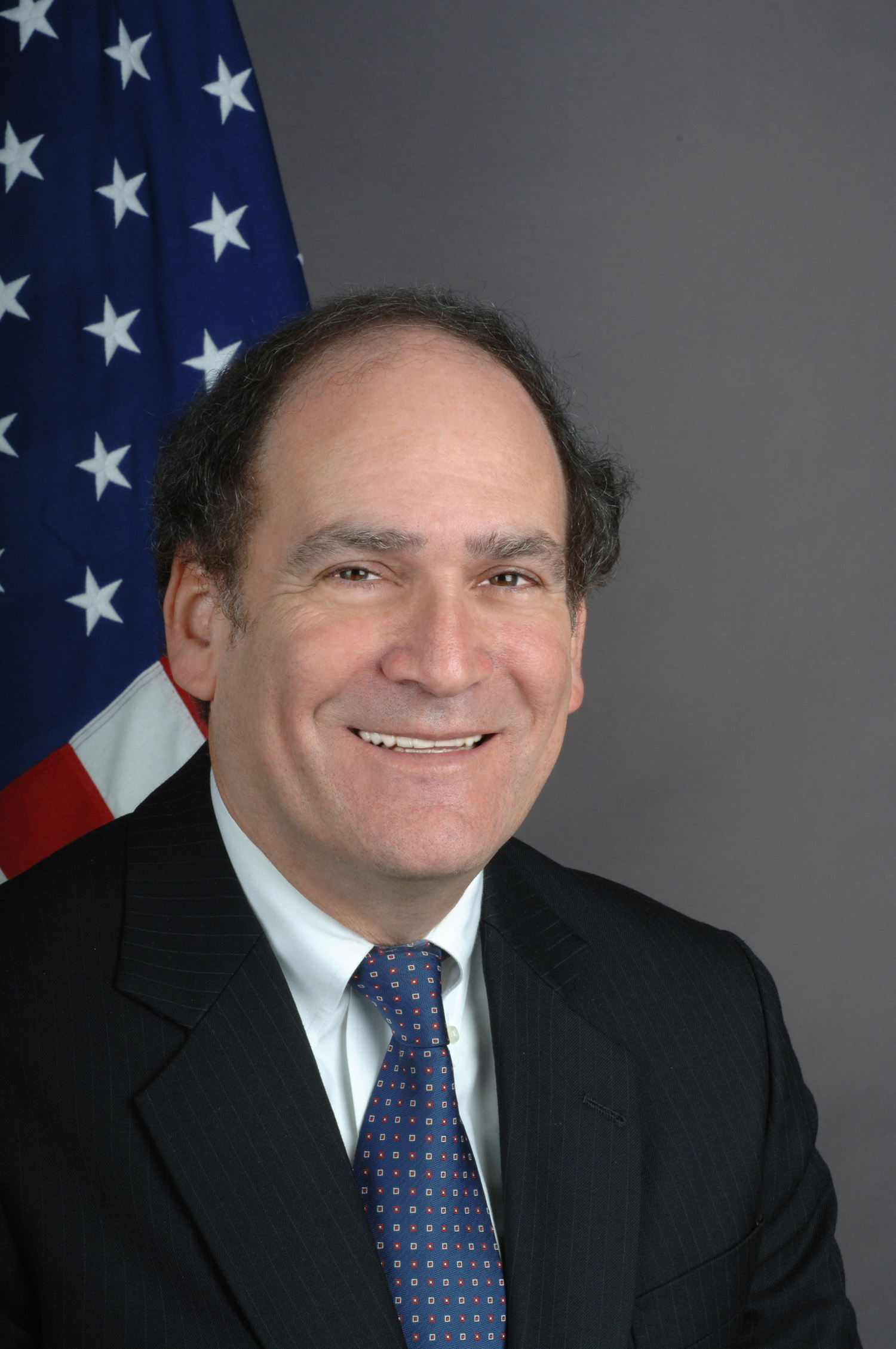

United States Ambassador to the Republic of the Congo
- In office March 21, 2006 – March 2, 2008
- President: George W. Bush
- Preceded by: Robin R. Sanders
- Succeeded by: Alan W. Eastham

Personal details
- Born: 1950 (age 75–76) Hagerstown, Maryland, U.S.
- Education: Haverford College; University of North Carolina School of Law; National War College
- Profession: Diplomat

Robert “Rob” Weisberg (born 1950 in Hagerstown, Maryland) was the American Ambassador to the Republic of the Congo from March 21, 2006, until March 2, 2008.

== Early life and education ==
He graduated from Haverford College, the University of North Carolina School of Law, and the National War College and is a member of the bar in New Hampshire and New York.

== Career ==
While at the US Embassy in Moscow between 1984 and 1986, Weisberg "was an active participant in the Mission's outreach to Soviet dissidents and Soviet Jews who had been refused exit visas."

He oversaw the opening of the American Embassy in Dili, East Timor, from 2000 until 2002.

Before entering the Foreign Service, Weisberg was a development officer at Dartmouth College.

Diplomatic posts
Preceded by Robin R. Sanders	United States Ambassador to the Republic of the Congo; March 21, 2006 – March 2, 2008	Succeeded by Alan W. Eastham
