= List of ambassadors of the United States to the African Union =

This is a list of United States ambassadors to the African Union.

== Ambassadors ==
Ambassador	Image	Assumed office	Left office
Cindy Courville		December 22, 2006	June 1, 2008
John A. Simon		October 3, 2008	January 20, 2009
Michael Battle		November 2, 2009	September 22, 2013
Reuben Brigety		October 7, 2013	September 24, 2015
Mary Beth Leonard		September 13, 2016	September 14, 2019
Jessica Lapenn		October 14, 2019	February 1, 2023
Stephanie S. Sullivan		August 29, 2024	December 30, 2025
