= Michael Battle (diplomat) =

American diplomat (born 1950)

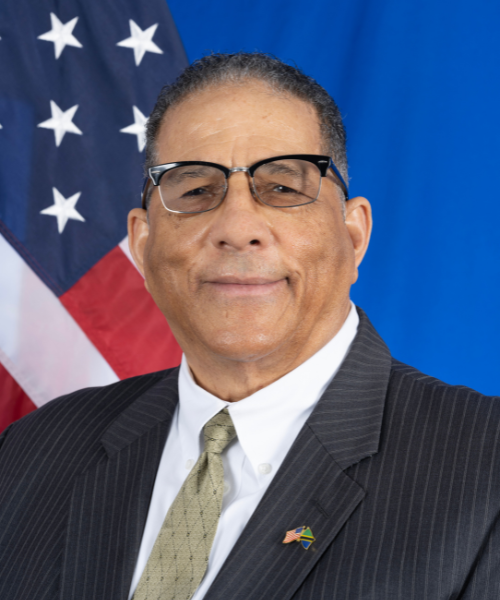

United States Ambassador to Tanzania
- In office February 27, 2023 – January 15, 2025
- President: Joe Biden
- Preceded by: Don J. Wright
- Succeeded by: William Trachman

United States Ambassador to the African Union
- In office November 2, 2009 – September 22, 2013
- President: Barack Obama
- Preceded by: John A. Simon
- Succeeded by: Reuben Brigety

Personal details
- Born: July 28, 1950 (age 76) St. Louis, Missouri, U.S.
- Education: Trinity College (BA); Duke University (MDiv); Howard University (DMin)

Military service
- Branch/service: United States Army
- Unit: United States Army Reserve

Michael A. Battle Sr. (born July 28, 1950) is an American diplomat, chaplain, and academic administrator who had served as United States ambassador to Tanzania. He previously served as ambassador to the African Union from 2009 to 2013.

== Early life and education ==
Battle was born in St. Louis in 1950. He earned a Bachelor of Arts degree in religious studies from Trinity College, a Master of Divinity degree from Duke University, and a Doctor of Ministry degree from Howard University.

== Career ==
From 1976 to 1996, Battle worked as the chaplain of Hampton University. From 1996 to 1998, he was the associate vice president of Virginia State University. From 1998 to 2003, he worked as the vice president of Chicago State University. He also served as a chaplain in the United States Army Reserve for 20 years. In the 1990s, Battle also worked as the vice president of the American Committee on Africa (now Africa Action). From 2003 to 2009, Battle was the seventh president of the Interdenominational Theological Center.

=== United States ambassador to the African Union ===
In 2009, Battle was nominated by President Barack Obama to serve as the United States ambassador to the African Union.

=== United States ambassador to Tanzania ===
In August 2021, Battle was appointed by President Joe Biden to serve as United States ambassador to Tanzania. On May 24, 2022, hearings were held on his nomination before the Senate Foreign Relations Committee. On June 9, 2022, the committee favorably reported his nomination to the Senate. On December 13, 2022, Battle was confirmed in the Senate by voice vote. He was sworn in on December 21, 2022, and presented his credentials to President Samia Suluhu Hassan on February 27, 2023.

Diplomatic posts
Preceded by Reuben Brigety	United States Ambassador to the African Union; 2009–2013	Succeeded by John A. Simon
Preceded by Don J. Wright	United States Ambassador to Tanzania; 2023–2025	Succeeded by William Trachman
