= Cindy Courville =

American diplomat

Cindy L. Courville
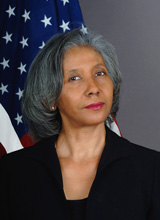

1st United States Ambassador to the African Union
- In office December 22, 2006 – June 1, 2008
- Preceded by: Position established
- Succeeded by: John A. Simon

Personal details
- Born: 1954 (age 71–72)
- Education: University of Louisiana at Lafayette (B.A.), (M.A.); University of Denver (Josef Korbel School) (M.A.), (Ph.D.)

Dr. Cindy Lou Courville (born 1954) was the U.S. Ambassador to the African Union from 2006 to 2008. Previously she was Special Assistant to the President and Senior Director for African Affairs at the National Security Council where she helped craft United States policy towards Africa.

== Early life and education ==
Courville was raised in Opelousas, Louisiana and served as secretary of her town's NAACP chapter when she was 15 years old. Her father worked for International Harvester while her mother was a seamstress and cook at Courville's childhood school.

Ambassador Courville graduated from the University of Louisiana at Lafayette with a B.A. and M.A. in political science and an M.A. and Ph.D. from the University of Denver's Graduate School of International Studies (now the Josef Korbel School of International Studies), in comparative politics and international relations.

== Professional experience ==
Ambassador Courville currently serves as COO and EVP, PMIC Global. Ambassador Courville's professional experience includes ten years in the University arena as a member of the political science faculty at Hanover College in Indiana and Occidental College in Los Angeles. She was an Honorary Research Fellow at the University of Zimbabwe; a Shell Oil Fellow at the University of Denver; and a Ford Minority Post-Doctoral Fellow at the University of California at Los Angeles.

In 2008, Courville received an honorary doctorate from her alma mater, the University of Louisiana at Lafayette.

== Government work ==
Ambassador Courville went to the NSC from the Defense Intelligence Agency (DIA), where she served as a Senior Intelligence Officer in the Office of the Chief of Staff. In her career at DIA, she also served the Deputy Assistant Defense Intelligence Office for Africa Policy as a liaison to the Office of the Secretary of Defense for Africa, the National Security Council, the Department of State, and the Office of the Secretary of Defense. Ambassador Courville was also the Director for East African Affairs in the Office of the Secretary of Defense where she was responsible for the coordination of U.S. military and security policy with East Africa and the Horn of Africa. Ambassador Courville previously served as Director for African Affairs at the National Security Council from June 2001 through August 2003.
