= Henry L. T. Koren =

American ambassador to the Republic of the Congo from 1964 to 1965

Henry Lloyd Thornell Koren (1911 Princeton, New Jersey-July 6, 1994 Williamsburg, Virginia) was the Ambassador Extraordinary and Plenipotentiary Congo (Brazzaville) from 1964 until 1965. He also served as a White House aide and deputy undersecretary of the Army.

== Biography ==
Henry Lloyd Thornell Koren was born in 1991 in Princeton, New Jersey. He graduated from Princeton University, went to work for the Bank of New York and then served in World War II in Europe, leaving the army with the rank of Colonel.

He was executive assistant to President Dwight D. Eisenhower from 1956 to 1958 and was deputy ambassador and head of civil operations in Vietnam during the mid-1960s.

Some of the issues he worked on included the American civil pacification program in South Vietnam and the new Panama Canal treaty. He died of a cardiac arrest on July 6, 1994.
