= List of ambassadors of the United States to the Republic of the Congo =

Ambassador of the United States to the Republic of the Congo
- Seal of the United States Department of State

- Flag of a United States ambassador

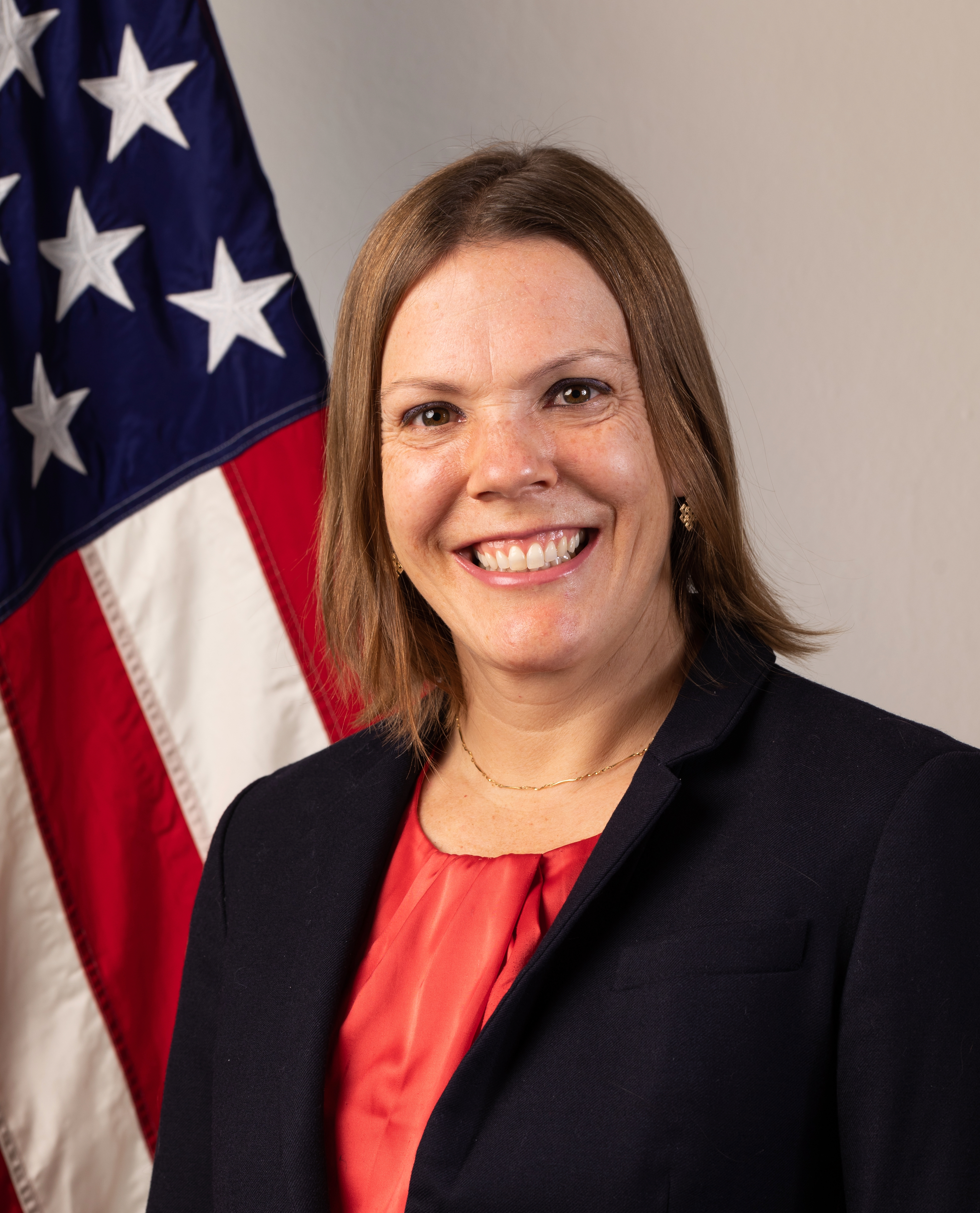
- Incumbent; Amanda Jacobsen; Chargé d'affaires since July 21, 2025
- Nominator: The president of the United States
- Appointer: The president; with Senate advice and consent
- Inaugural holder: W. Wendell Blancke as Ambassador Extraordinary and Plenipotentiary
- Formation: November 9, 1960
- Website: U.S. Embassy - Brazzaville

This is a list of ambassadors of the United States to the Republic of the Congo.

From 1885 until 1960, the republic had been under the control of France as a protectorate. In 1908, France organized French Equatorial Africa (AEF), comprising its colonies of Middle Congo (modern Congo), Gabon, Chad, and Oubangui-Chari (now Central African Republic). Brazzaville was selected as the federal capital.

In 1958 Middle Congo became an autonomous colony and was renamed Republic of the Congo. The republic was granted full independence on August 15, 1960. As the Belgian Congo (now the Democratic Republic of the Congo) also chose the name Republic of Congo upon receiving its independence, the two countries were more commonly known as Congo-Leopoldville and Congo-Brazzaville, after their capital cities.

The United States immediately recognized the new Republic of the Congo and moved to establish diplomatic relations. The embassy in Brazzaville was established August 15, 1960, with Alan W. Lukens as Chargé d'Affaires ad interim. The first ambassador, W. Wendell Blancke was appointed on November 9, 1960.

== Ambassadors ==
Name	Title	Appointed	Presented credentials	Terminated mission	Notes
W. Wendell Blancke – Career FSO	Ambassador Extraordinary and Plenipotentiary	November 9, 1960	December 23, 1960	December 14, 1963	
Henry L. T. Koren – Career FSO	Ambassador Extraordinary and Plenipotentiary	April 8, 1964	May 13, 1964	August 4, 1965	Due to civil strife and insecure conditions, the U.S. Embassy in Brazzaville was closed and all diplomatic personnel were withdrawn from the country on August 15, 1965. The embassy was reestablished on October 30, 1977, with Jay Katzen as chargé d'affaires ad interim. A new ambassador was appointed on April 26, 1979.
William L. Swing – Career FSO	Ambassador Extraordinary and Plenipotentiary	April 26, 1979	May 11, 1979	May 30, 1981	
Kenneth Lee Brown – Career FSO	Ambassador Extraordinary and Plenipotentiary	December 11, 1981	February 13, 1982	June 10, 1984	
Alan Wood Lukens – Career FSO	Ambassador Extraordinary and Plenipotentiary	August 13, 1984	September 22, 1984	May 6, 1987	
Leonard Grant Shurtleff – Career FSO	Ambassador Extraordinary and Plenipotentiary	August 10, 1987	September 26, 1987	July 5, 1990	
James Daniel Phillips – Career FSO	Ambassador Extraordinary and Plenipotentiary	June 27, 1990	August 23, 1990	September 10, 1993	
William Christie Ramsay – Career FSO	Ambassador Extraordinary and Plenipotentiary	July 16, 1993	September 23, 1993	April 13, 1996	
Aubrey Hooks – Career FSO	Ambassador Extraordinary and Plenipotentiary	June 6, 1996	July 11, 1996	January 9, 1999	
David H. Kaeuper – Career FSO	Ambassador Extraordinary and Plenipotentiary	November 16, 1999	December 27, 1999	September 5, 2002	
Robin Renee Sanders – Career FSO	Ambassador Extraordinary and Plenipotentiary	November 15, 2002	February 13, 2003	July 16, 2005	
Robert Weisberg – Career FSO	Ambassador Extraordinary and Plenipotentiary	March 21, 2006	April 27, 2006	March 2, 2008	
Alan W. Eastham – Career FSO	Ambassador Extraordinary and Plenipotentiary	August 22, 2008	November 18, 2008	July 23, 2010	
Christopher W. Murray – Career FSO	Ambassador Extraordinary and Plenipotentiary	August 23, 2010	September 16, 2010	August 14, 2013	
Stephanie S. Sullivan – Career FSO	Ambassador Extraordinary and Plenipotentiary	August 12, 2013	November 26, 2013	January 20, 2017	
Todd Philip Haskell – Career FSO	Ambassador Extraordinary and Plenipotentiary	May 19, 2017	July 13, 2017	January 28, 2021	
Daniel Travis	Chargé d’Affaires ad interim	January 28, 2021	–	March 30, 2022	
Eugene Young – Career FSO	Ambassador Extraordinary and Plenipotentiary	December 18, 2021	March 30, 2022	July 10, 2025	
Meghan Moore – Career FSO	Chargé d’Affaires ad interim	July 10, 2025	–	July 21, 2025	
Amanda S. Jacobsen – Career FSO	Chargé d’Affaires ad interim	July 21, 2025	–	Incumbent	

== See also ==
- Republic of the Congo – United States relations
- Foreign relations of the Republic of the Congo
- Ambassadors of the United States
