= Scott Colom =

American politician and lawyer (born 1982)

- Colom in 2026

United States Senator-elect from Mississippi
- Assuming office January 3, 2027
- Succeeding: Cindy Hyde-Smith

District Attorney for the 16th Judicial District of Mississippi
- Incumbent
- Assumed office January 4, 2016
- Preceded by: Forrest Allgood

Personal details
- Born: Scott Winston Colom; December 24, 1982 (age 43) Columbus, Mississippi, U.S.
- Party: Democratic
- Spouse: Nadia Colom
- Children: 2
- Education: Millsaps College (BA); University of Wisconsin–Madison (JD)
- Website: District Attorney website; Campaign website

Scott Winston Colom (/kəˈloʊm/ kə-LOHM; born December 24, 1982) is an American politician, lawyer, and jurist who is a United States senator-elect from Mississippi. A member of the Democratic Party, Colom has served as district attorney for the 16th Judicial District of Mississippi since 2016.

Born and raised in rural Mississippi, Colom graduated from Millsaps College and the University of Wisconsin Law School. He was a judge and prosecutor in Lowndes County before being elected district attorney in 2015. In 2022, President Joe Biden nominated him to serve as a United States district judge of the United States District Court for the Northern District of Mississippi, but his nomination was blocked by Mississippi Senator Cindy Hyde-Smith.

Colom was the Democratic nominee for U.S. Senate in the 2026 election, in which he narrowly defeated Hyde-Smith in what media and political observers widely called a major upset. He will be the first Black senator from Mississippi since Blanche Bruce, and is the first Democrat elected to the Senate from Mississippi since John C. Stennis in 1982, the first popularly elected Black senator from Mississippi, and the first Black person elected to any statewide office in Mississippi since Reconstruction. He is also the first person to unseat an incumbent senator in Mississippi since 1942.

== Early life and education ==
Colom's father Wilbur Colom, Republican nominee for Mississippi State Treasurer in 1987

Colom was born in Columbus, Mississippi, on December 24, 1982. His father, Wilbur Colom, also a lawyer, was the Republican nominee for state treasurer in 1987. His mother, Dorothy (née Winston) Colom, was the first Black person elected to a Mississippi Chancery Courts judgeship in their district. He attended Christ School in Arden, North Carolina, from 1996 to 1998 before transferring and graduating from Columbus High School.

Colom earned a Bachelor of Arts with a double major in English and history from Millsaps College in 2005 and a Juris Doctor, cum laude, from the University of Wisconsin Law School in 2009. While in law school, he interned for the chief prosecutor at the International Criminal Tribunal for Rwanda in Tanzania, as well as the United States Justice Department.

== Early career ==
After college, Colom worked as an English teacher in Guyana for one year for WorldTeach before enrolling in law school. After graduating from law school he worked as a staff lawyer at the Mississippi Center for Justice, a public interest law firm, from 2009 to 2011.

Colom then managed the Colom Law Firm from 2011 to 2016 while serving part-time in various public offices until his election as district attorney; he was appointed the youngest and first Black justice court judge in Lowndes County history in 2011 at age 28, and served from 2012 to 2013 as a municipal court judge in Aberdeen, Mississippi, and as interim justice court judge in Lowndes County. From 2013 to 2016, he served as part-time city prosecutor of Columbus, becoming the city's first Black city prosecutor.

Election map for the 2015 Mississippi 16th Judicial District election, where Scott Colom ousted the independent Forrest Allgood. Precinct results: Colom: 50–60% 60–70% 70–80% 80–90% >90% Allgood: 50–60% 60–70% 70–80% 80–90%

Colom was elected district attorney for the 16th Judicial District of Mississippi (Clay, Lowndes, Noxubee, and Oktibbeha Counties) in 2015, defeating the nearly 30-year incumbent, Forrest Allgood. He was sworn in on January 4, 2016. He was the first Black person elected district attorney for the 16th Circuit and the first Black person elected district attorney to a majority-white voting district in the history of Mississippi. He ran unopposed in 2019 and was reelected. He ran for reelection in 2023, was unopposed in the Democratic primary, and was reelected with over 56% of the vote.

=== Notable cases ===
In 2012, Colom represented Taylor Bell, a student at Itawamba Agricultural High School who was disciplined by the school for publishing a rap song on Facebook that contained vulgar lyrics and criticized two coaches at the school. The district court dismissed Bell's challenge. A panel of the United States Court of Appeals for the Fifth Circuit reversed the dismissal, finding that disciplining a student for purely off-campus activities violates the First Amendment, but the Court of Appeals reheard the school board's appeal en banc and upheld Bell's dismissal. Through Colom's efforts, Eddie Lee Howard, who spent 23 years on death row for a murder conviction based on discredited bite mark evidence, was exonerated in 2021.

== 2022 U.S. District Court nomination ==
On October 14, 2022, President Joe Biden announced his intent to nominate Colom to serve as a United States district judge of the United States District Court for the Northern District of Mississippi. On November 15, his nomination was sent to the Senate. Biden was nominating Colom to the seat vacated by Judge Michael P. Mills, who assumed senior status on November 1. On January 3, 2023, Colom's nomination was returned to the president under Rule XXXI, Paragraph 6, of the United States Senate. Colom was renominated on January 23, 2023. Congressman Bennie Thompson initially recommended Colom for the role in a November 2021 letter to the White House.

Colom received support from Senator Roger Wicker, who returned his blue slip (a Senate tradition that gives the two senators from the candidate's state the ability to block or approve the candidate), but on April 4, 2023, it was announced that Senator Cindy Hyde-Smith would not return her blue slip, effectively blocking his nomination. Hyde-Smith cited as reasons for her opposition that Colom allegedly supported letting transgender students participate in girls' and women's sports and that he had received money from a PAC funded by George Soros.

On April 10, Colom wrote Hyde-Smith a letter asking her to reconsider her opposition to his nomination. In the letter, he said that he had not requested money from the PAC, did not know the money would be contributed, and did not receive money from the PAC when he was reelected in 2019. The letter also said he never discussed his policies or any decisions he made as district attorney with anyone from the PAC or with Soros. It disputed that Colom had ever taken a position on letting transgender students participate in girls' and women's sports; instead, he said, he had signed onto a letter with other district attorneys condemning the criminalization of gender-affirming surgery. Colom's nomination received bipartisan support from Thompson, Wicker, and former governors Phil Bryant and Haley Barbour. Nevertheless, on January 3, 2024, his nomination was returned to the president, ending the process. Colom went on to unseat Hyde-Smith in the 2026 U.S. Senate election in Mississippi.

== U.S. Senate ==
=== 2026 election ===
Supporters of Colom wearing "Pick Another Senator Instead" shirts

In September 2025, Colom announced his candidacy for the Democratic nomination for the U.S. Senate in the 2026 Mississippi general election. He defeated Priscilla Williams-Till and Albert Littell in the March 10, 2026, Democratic primary. In the November general election, Colom faced the incumbent, Republican Cindy Hyde-Smith, and an independent challenge from Ty Pinkins, the previous Democratic nominee for Senate. Despite getting little to no media coverage when compared to other races of the cycle, Colom was able to secure high-profile endorsements from figures such as Barack Obama, Chuck Schumer, Elizabeth Warren, and Alexandria Ocasio-Cortez. Colom also was endorsed by Raphael Warnock, Pete Buttigieg, Kamala Harris, and Bill Clinton, all of whom stumped for him during the campaign.

In October 2026, Colom's campaign released an ad mocking a comment by Hyde-Smith in which she, dismissing concerns about the rising price of beef, said that consumers "have so many proteins to choose from". The ad featured Mississippians reacting with disbelief, including an Army veteran drawling: "Pick another protein? Sheee-it, I'd rather pick another senator instead." Posted on social media, it went viral, reaching more than 15 million views on Colom's X account by early November; The New York Times called it one of the 10 ads that defined the midterms.

Despite polling aggregators predicting sub-10 percent chances of Colom winning the seat, he won by about 0.8 percentage points, with news outlets calling the race for him eight days after Election Day, whereupon Hyde-Smith conceded. Despite the narrowness of his win, the race was not subject to a recount because Mississippi does not have any laws concerning recounts. His win was widely described as a major upset. Colom later criticized the polling industry, arguing that its inelasticity in categorizing races in the South had made it particularly difficult to raise money.

Colom will be the first Black person to represent Mississippi in the U.S. Senate since Blanche Bruce, who was elected in 1874 and left office in 1881, and is the first Black person to win statewide office in Mississippi since the Reconstruction era. He is the first Democrat to represent the state in the Senate since John C. Stennis, who left office in 1989, and the first person to unseat an incumbent senator in Mississippi since 1942, when incumbent Wall Doxey lost in the primary to James Eastland.

== Political positions ==
Colom's campaign centered on helping working-class Americans and putting money back in their pockets. He opposes tariffs as a "Mississippi last" policy by acting as an additional sales tax on buyers and applauded Senator Rand Paul for opposing them. He opposes cuts to Medicaid and the Affordable Care Act due to the funding they provide for rural care and hospital systems. Colom supports eliminating income taxes for anyone making under $75,000, starting with teachers and police officers. He supports eliminating corporate subsidies and other tax loopholes. Colom supports law enforcement and has said he will "work to secure the border and enforce our immigration laws". Of transgender rights, he has said: "I believe in fairness in girls' sports, and I don't believe in gender-affirming surgery for children."

== Personal life ==
Colom has two daughters with his wife, Nadia Colom. He is a member of Alpha Phi Alpha. His identical twin brother, Andrew Colom, is a real estate developer in Detroit who also worked on Scott's U.S. Senate campaign. He has called Leo Tolstoy his favorite author, specifically citing Anna Karenina as a source of wisdom, and is also a fan of Robert Caro and Toni Morrison. A Christian, Colom is a lifelong member of the Missionary Union Baptist Church, a prominent Black church in Columbus, Mississippi. Colom's favorite shoe is the Nike Air Force 1, and he asked Nike for a custom version for all valedictorians of Mississippi high schools shortly after his election to the Senate. Nike agreed to commission a pair of the shoes for every high school valedictorian in the class of 2027 nationwide.

== See also ==
- List of African-American United States Senate candidates
- Joe Biden judicial appointment controversies

Party political offices
Preceded by Mike Espy	Democratic nominee for U.S. Senator from Mississippi (Class 2); 2026	Most recent
U.S. Senate
Preceded by Cindy Hyde-Smith	United States Senator (Class 2) from Mississippi; Taking office 2027; Served alongside: Roger Wicker	Elect
