= 2026 United States Senate election in Mississippi =

- November 3, 2026
- Registered: 1,952,255

Nominee	Scott Colom	Cindy Hyde-Smith
Party	Democratic	Republican
Popular vote	480,153	472,122
Percentage	49.36%	48.54%
- Colom: 40–50% 50–60% 60–70% 70–80% 80–90% Hyde-Smith: 40–50% 50–60% 60–70% 70–80% 80–90%
U.S. senator before election
Cindy Hyde-Smith
Republican
Elected U.S. senator
Scott Colom
Democratic

The 2026 United States Senate election in Mississippi was held on November 3, 2026, to elect a member of the United States Senate to represent the state of Mississippi. Democratic district attorney Scott Colom defeated Republican incumbent Cindy Hyde-Smith in what was considered a major upset.

Primary elections were held on March 10. Seeking a second full term, Hyde-Smith won the Republican nomination with 80.8% of the vote. Colom won the Democratic nomination with 73% of the vote.

Though forecast as an uncompetitive hold for Republicans, the race proved to be extremely close, with Colom narrowly leading Hyde-Smith on election night. After more than a week of ballot counting, Colom was projected the winner on November 11. Colom is the first Democrat to win a Senate race in Mississippi since 1982 and the first African American to win a statewide election in Mississippi since Reconstruction. Hyde-Smith is the first U.S. senator from Mississippi to lose re-election since 1942.

== Background ==
The first lawmaker from any state in the United States of African American heritage to serve in either house of the U.S. Congress was free born Mississippi Republican Senator Hiram R. Revels who was elected by the state legislature (as in every state at the time) in 1870. Before Colom's victory, no African American had won a direct statewide election in Mississippi since 1873. Until Colom's victory, the second in the nation and last Black senator from Mississippi had been Blanche Bruce, who was born into slavery and elected in 1874 by the Mississippi State Legislature during the Reconstruction era. Colom's election is the first time ever that a Black senator has won the state's senatorship by popular vote because senatorial direct elections enacted by the Seventeenth Amendment began in 1914.

Mississippi has generally been considered to be a red state since the Republican Party's Southern Strategy political realignment in the 1960's of the Democratic Party's post-Reconstruction blue state Solid South of 1877. (Note: Many sources consistently describe racial appeals to white southerners against blacks as the primary force behind the southern strategy.) In 2011 Congressman Bennie Thompson became the sole Democratic and sole African-American in Mississippi's six-member congressional delegation. Before Colom's victory, the last Democrat to win a U.S. Senate seat in the state was John C. Stennis in 1982. However, some recent elections have been competitive, with Republican governor Tate Reeves winning by 5.1% in 2019 and 3.2% in 2023. Black voters, 40% of registered voters, tend to vote Democratic, though turnout is traditionally low. For this election, there was a surge in that voting population.

In 2022, District Attorney Scott Colom was nominated to the federal judgeship for the United States District Court for the Northern District of Mississippi by Joe Biden with backing of Republicans, including Mississippi's senior Senator Roger Wicker. However, Hyde-Smith effectively blocked the nomination in 2023 when she declined to return her blue slip. Colom has said he would not have sought the Senate seat if he had been confirmed.

Between the primary in May and election in November, at the direction of the Secretary of State of Mississippi Michael Watson, Mississippi purged its voter rolls using unverified data it had purchased from Experian, a consumer credit reporting company, leading to a significant amount of affidavit ballots.

Mail-in ballots postmarked by Election Day and delivered up to five business days later are counted. Affidavit ballots require the voter take action to be cured. Counties must submit their certified results within 10 days of the date of the election to the secretary of state. After submission (by November 13, 2026), the state must certify this election by December 3, 2026. Mississippi is the only state which does not provide a mechanism for recounts.

== Republican primary ==
=== Candidates ===
==== Nominee ====
- Cindy Hyde-Smith, incumbent U.S. senator

==== Eliminated in primary ====
- Sarah Adlakha, physician

=== Endorsements ===
Cindy Hyde-Smith

Executive branch officials

- Donald Trump, president of the United States (2017–2021, 2025–present)

U.S. senators

- Roger Wicker, Mississippi (2007–present)

U.S. representatives

- Trent Kelly, MS-01 (2015–present)
- Michael Guest, MS-03 (2019–present)
- Mike Ezell, MS-04 (2023–present)

Statewide officials

- Tate Reeves, governor of Mississippi (2020–present)
- Delbert Hosemann, lieutenant governor of Mississippi (2020–present)
- Lynn Fitch, attorney general of Mississippi (2020–present)
- David McRae, state treasurer of Mississippi (2020–present)
- Shad White, state auditor of Mississippi (2018–present)
- Andy Gipson, agriculture commissioner of Mississippi (2018–present)
- Mike Chaney, insurance commissioner of Mississippi (2008–present)

State legislators

- Jason White, speaker of the Mississippi House of Representatives (2024–present) from HD-48 (2012–present)
- 72 state representatives
- 34 state senators

Organizations

- AIPAC
- Maggie's List

=== Fundraising ===
Campaign finance reports as of March 31, 2026
Candidate	Raised	Spent	Cash on hand
Sarah Adlakha (R)	$566,184	$556,454	$9,729
Cindy Hyde-Smith (R)	$5,027,030	$2,729,948	$2,458,624
Source: Federal Election Commission

=== Results ===
County results Hyde-Smith: 70–80%; 80–90%; 90–100%

Congressional district results Hyde-Smith: 70–80%; 80–90%

Republican primary results
Party	Candidate	Votes	%
Republican	Cindy Hyde-Smith (incumbent)	127,852	80.8
Republican	Sarah Adlakha	30,344	19.2
Total votes		158,196	100.0

== Democratic primary ==
=== Candidates ===
==== Nominee ====
- Scott Colom, district attorney for the 16th Judicial District of Mississippi (2016–present)

==== Eliminated in primary ====
- Albert Littell, Marine Corps veteran
- Priscilla Williams-Till, teacher and cousin of Emmett Till

==== Withdrawn ====
- Ty Pinkins, lawyer, nominee for secretary of state in 2023, and nominee for U.S. Senate in 2024 (running as an Independent)

=== Endorsements ===
Scott Colom

U.S. representatives

- Bennie Thompson, MS-02 (1993–present)

State legislators

- 16 state representatives
- 6 state senators

Labor unions

- Mississippi AFL-CIO

Organizations

- Congressional Black Caucus PAC
- Indivisible DeSoto MS

=== Fundraising ===
Campaign finance reports as of March 31, 2026
Candidate	Raised	Spent	Cash on hand
Scott Colom (D)	$1,619,367	$1,059,740	$559,626
Source: Federal Election Commission

=== Results ===
County results Colom: 40–50%; 50–60%; 60–70%; 70–80%; 80–90%; 90–100%

Congressional district results Colom: 60–70%; 70–80%

Democratic primary results
Party	Candidate	Votes	%
Democratic	Scott Colom	109,817	72.9
Democratic	Priscilla Williams-Till	28,075	18.6
Democratic	Albert Littell	12,749	8.5
Total votes		150,641	100.0

== Third-party and independent candidates ==
=== Candidates ===
==== Declared ====
- Ty Pinkins (Independent), lawyer, Democratic nominee for Secretary of State in 2023 and U.S. Senate in 2024

=== Fundraising ===
Campaign finance reports as of December 31, 2025
Candidate	Raised	Spent	Cash on hand
Ty Pinkins (I)	$79,244	$81,879	$2,980
Source: Federal Election Commission

== General election ==
Pre-election polls favored Hyde-Smith. However, results on election night showed the race as being extremely close, with Colom ahead by only 28 votes shortly after midnight on November 4 with 96% of votes counted, growing over the course of the day to slightly over 1,000 votes. Roughly 3,600 mail-in ballots and potentially 15,000 provisional ballots were yet to be counted as of November 4. As outstanding ballots were processed, Colom's lead widened. On November 11, he was ahead by 4,585 votes according to unofficial results, and he was projected the winner by news outlets, although the count had not yet been certified.

=== Pick another protein ===
Supporters of Colom wearing "Pick Another Senator Instead" shirts

In February 2026, during an interview, Hyde-Smith was asked about the rising cost of beef and what Republicans were doing about it. As part of her response, Hyde-Smith said: "You know, you have so many proteins to choose from." Colom used Hyde-Smith's response in an ad, and included in his ad people reacting to her comment, with one of the reactants saying, "Pick another protein? She done lost her damn mind. I'd rather pick another senator." The ad was not aired on television; however, it went viral after Colom posted it on his X account. The ad gave Colom's campaign national attention, and it brought focus to rising costs, a defining issue of the year.

=== Predictions ===
Source	Ranking	As of
The Cook Political Report	Likely R	November 2, 2026
Decision Desk HQ	Likely R	November 3, 2026
The Economist (Note: The Economist's prediction model uses unconventional terminology. For the purpose of equivalency, their "Very Likely" ratings are formatted as a "Likely" rating while "Likely" ratings are formatted as a "Lean" rating.)	Likely R	November 3, 2026
FiftyPlusOne	Safe R	November 3, 2026
Fox News	Likely R	November 1, 2026
Inside Elections	Likely R	October 29, 2026
MS NOW	Likely R	October 29, 2026
NBC News	Likely R	November 3, 2026
RealClearPolitics	Likely R	November 2, 2026
Sabato's Crystal Ball	Likely R	November 2, 2026
Silver Bulletin	Solid R	November 3, 2026
Split Ticket	Likely R	November 2, 2026

=== Post-primary endorsements ===
Cindy Hyde-Smith (R)

U.S. senators

- Katie Britt, Alabama (2023–present)
- John Kennedy, Louisiana (2017–present)
- John Thune, South Dakota (2005–present), Senate Majority Leader (2025–present)

Organizations

- U.S. Chamber of Commerce
Scott Colom (D)

Executive branch officials

- Pete Buttigieg, former secretary of transportation (2021–2025)
- Bill Clinton, former president of the United States (1993–2001)
- Kamala Harris, former vice president of the United States (2021–2025)
- Joe Kennedy III, former United States Special Envoy for Northern Ireland (2022–2024)
- Barack Obama, former president of the United States (2009–2017)

U.S. senators

- Angela Alsobrooks, Maryland (2025–present)
- Lisa Blunt Rochester, Delaware (2025–present)
- Cory Booker, New Jersey (2013–present)
- Maria Cantwell, Washington (2001–present)
- Kirsten Gillibrand, New York (2007–present)
- Chuck Schumer, New York (1999–present), Senate Minority Leader (2025–present)
- Raphael Warnock, Georgia (2021–present)
- Elizabeth Warren, Massachusetts (2013–present)
- Sheldon Whitehouse, Rhode Island (2007–present)

U.S. representatives

- Jasmine Crockett, TX-30 (2023–present)
- Alexandria Ocasio-Cortez, NY-14 (2019–present)

Statewide officials

- Brandon Presley, former Public Services Commissioner (2008–2024) and nominee for governor in 2023
- JB Pritzker, governor of Illinois (2019–present)

Labor unions

- American Federation of Government Employees
- Association of Flight Attendants-CWA
- National Education Association
- United Auto Workers

Newspapers

- The Commercial Dispatch

=== Fundraising ===
Campaign finance reports as of October 14, 2026
Candidate	Raised	Spent	Cash on hand
Cindy Hyde-Smith (R)	$6,279,659	$5,045,478	$1,395,724
Scott Colom (D)	$4,400,890	$3,382,173	$1,018,717
Ty Pinkins (I)	$104,311	$105,063	$4,863
Source: Federal Election Commission

=== Polling ===
Aggregate polls

Source of poll aggregation	Dates administered	Dates updated	Cindy Hyde-Smith (R)	Scott Colom (D)	Other/ Undecided (Note: Calculated by taking the difference of 100% and all other candidates combined.)	Margin
Silver Bulletin	through October 22, 2026	November 3, 2026	45.7%	39.2%	15.1%	Hyde-Smith +6.5%

Poll source	Date(s) administered	Sample size (Note: Key: A – all adults RV – registered voters LV – likely voters V – unclear)	Margin of error	Cindy Hyde-Smith (R)	Scott Colom (D)	Ty Pinkins (I)	Undecided
Change Research (D)	October 21–22, 2026	842 (LV)	± 3.5%	43%	40%	6%	9%
Data for Progress (D) (Note: Poll sponsored by Way to Lead PAC, which supports Democrats)	August 5–15, 2026	1,018 (LV)	± 3.0%	44%	38%	7%	11%
Data for Progress (D)	August 5–15, 2026	1,018 (LV)	± 3.0%	47%	41%	—	12%
Impact Research (D) (Note: Poll sponsored by the SPLC Action Fund, which opposes Hyde-Smith)	April 8–12, 2026	500 (LV)	± 4.4%	42%	39%	6%	13%
Impact Research (D)	April 8–12, 2026	500 (LV)	± 4.4%	47%	44%	—	9%
	March 10, 2026	Primary elections					
Impact Research (D)	June 18–22, 2025	500 (RV)	± 4.4%	51%	38%	—	11%

Hypothetical polling

Cindy Hyde-Smith vs. generic opponent

Poll source	Date(s) administered	Sample size	Margin of error	Cindy Hyde-Smith (R)	Generic Opponent	Undecided
Impact Research (D)	April 8–12, 2026	500 (LV)	± 4.4%	33%	53%	14%
Impact Research (D)	June 18–22, 2025	500 (RV)	± 4.4%	38%	46%	16%

=== Results ===
The race unexpectedly became too close to call on election night. Colom strongly criticized election forecasters, including the Cook Political Report, for writing off Mississippi's election as a solidly Republican race instead of considering its competitive edge. He stated that it made it difficult for him and other Southern Democratic candidates, like Jamie Davis (who narrowly lost in Louisiana), to fundraise. The day after the election, Colom led by a slim margin of 937 votes. Colom's lead continued to grow over the next week. By November 11, when most news networks projected Colom to win, he led by over 4,000 votes. Mississippi is scheduled to certify Colom's victory on December 3.

2026 United States Senate election in Mississippi
Party	Candidate	Votes	%	±%
Democratic	Scott Colom	480,153	49.36	+5.13
Republican	Cindy Hyde-Smith (incumbent)	472,122	48.54	−4.89
Independent	Ty Pinkins	20,469	2.10	N/A
Total votes		972,744	100	
Democratic gain from Republican				

==== Counties that flipped from Republican to Democratic ====
- DeSoto (largest municipality: Southaven, suburbs of Memphis, Tennessee)
- Forrest (largest municipality: Hattiesburg)
- Grenada (largest municipality: Grenada)
- Lafayette (largest municipality: Oxford)
- Madison (largest municipality: Madison)
- Montgomery (largest municipality: Winona)
- Winston (largest municipality: Louisville)
- Yalobusha (largest municipality: Water Valley)

==== By congressional district ====
Despite losing the state, Hyde-Smith won three of four congressional districts.

District	Colom	Hyde-Smith	Representative
1st	42.77%	55.21%	Trent Kelly
2nd	68.89%	29.62%	Bennie Thompson
3rd	45.08%	53.07%	Michael Guest
4th	39.51%	57.31%	Mike Ezell

== Analysis ==
Colom's victory was generally considered as an upset. Despite Donald Trump winning Mississippi by 23% (61% - 38%) in the presidential election in 2024, Colom was able to build a coalition to defeat Hyde-Smith. Colom won 38 of the 82 counties in Mississippi, including 18 that Trump won, ten of which Trump won by double digits. Colom did this by both maximizing Democrat turnout and winning 9% of Trump voters. Additionally, Colom exceeded Harris's vote total in the state from 2024, which is a rare feat in a midterm; conversely, Hyde-Smith received 300,000 fewer votes than Trump. Mississippi was the second-toughest state, (Note: Defined as how big the margin of victory was for the opposing party's presidential nominee in the most recent presidential election.) after Illinois in 2010, that either major party flipped in a Senate election since 1986, going from Donald Trump's 23-point margin of victory to Colom's narrow victory.

Colom's victory occurred as part of a broader Democratic sweep in the 2026 midterms, and it was seen as particularly emblematic of growing Democratic strength in the South. Democrats additionally flipped Senate seats in Texas, South Carolina, and North Carolina; and they also came unexpectedly close in Louisiana. Colom outperformed Kamala Harris's performance in 2024, earning roughly 8,100 more votes. Twelve counties with majority-Black populations had more Democratic votes than in 2024; of them, Clay County posted the largest turnout increase by 17 points.

=== Exit poll ===
2026 United States Senate election in Mississippi (CNN)
Demographic subgroup	Colom	Hyde-Smith	% of total vote
Ideology
Liberals	97	2	16
Moderates	76	23	32
Conservatives	18	79	52
Party
Democrats	99	1	32
Republicans	6	92	44
Independents	62	34	24
Donald Trump job approval
Approve	3	96	45
Disapprove	87	10	55
2024 presidential vote
Kamala Harris	99	1	42
Donald Trump	9	88	54
Gender
Men	38	59	45
Women	58	40	55
Income
$100,000 or more	50	49	30
$50,000-$99,999	42	54	29
Less than $50,000	55	43	41
Race/ethnicity
White	27	71	65
Black	97	2	32
White born-again or evangelical Christian?
Yes	8	90	39
No	75	23	61
Race by gender
White men	21	76	34
White women	33	65	32
Black men	96	3	10
Black women	99	1	20
Age
18–44 years old	62	34	27
45–64 years old	50	48	38
65 and older	38	61	34
Area type
Urban	71	28	14
Suburban	61	37	17
Rural	41	57	68
Education
College graduate	57	41	36
No college degree	44	53	64
Education by race
White college graduates	42	56	25
Non-white college graduates	94	6	11
Whites without college	18	80	40
Non-whites without college	90	8	24
Education by gender and race
White women with college degrees	50	48	14
White women without college degrees	20	77	18
White men with college degrees	32	64	12
White men without college degrees	15	83	22
Voters of color	91	7	35
Educational attainment
Advanced degree	64	35	17
Bachelor's degree	51	47	19
Associate's degree	52	44	14
Some college	53	46	20
Never attended college	34	64	29

== Notes ==
Partisan clients

== See also ==
- List of United States senators from Mississippi
- List of African-American United States senators
