= Jessica Lapenn =

American diplomat

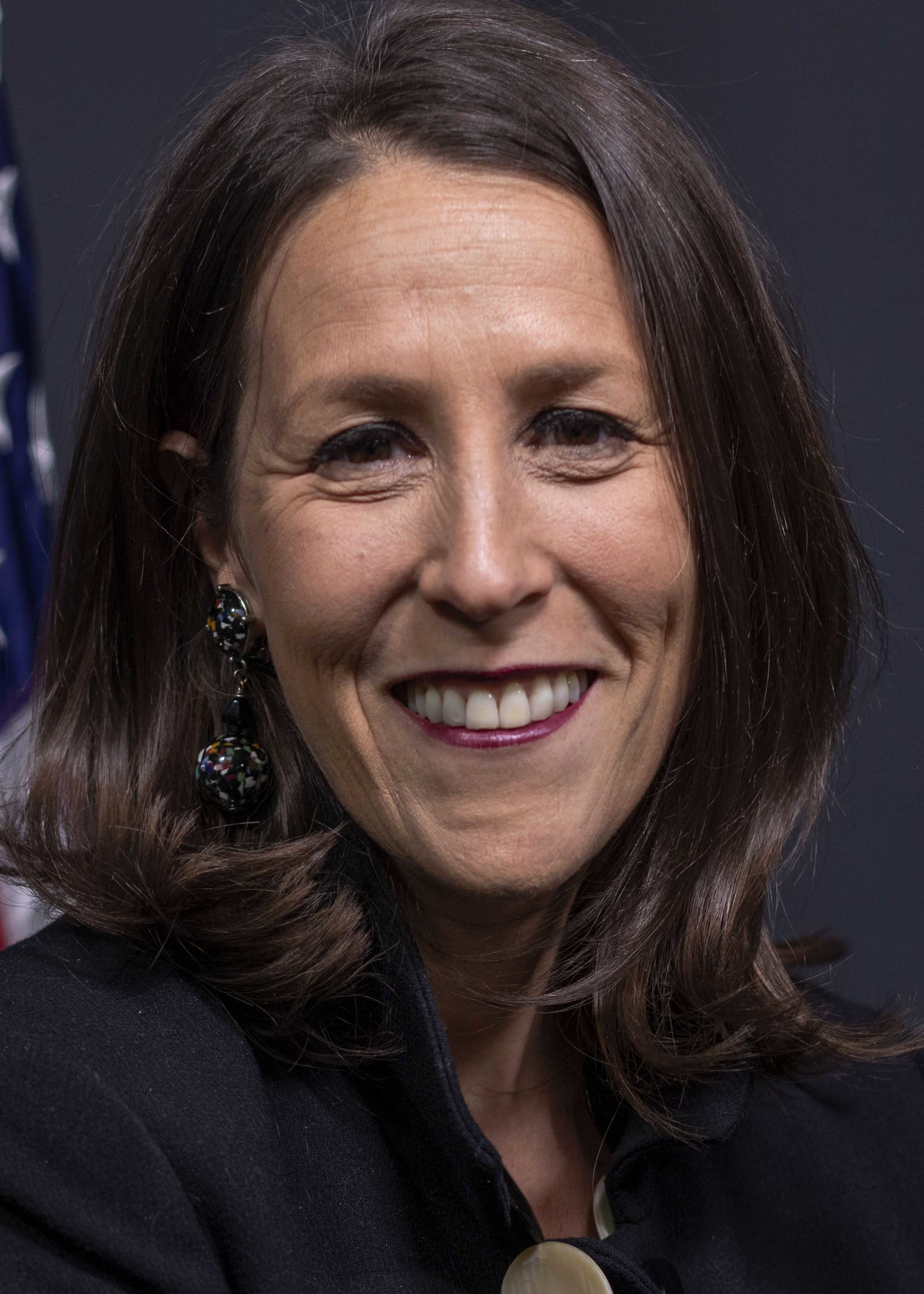

United States Ambassador to the African Union and U.S. Permanent Representative to the United Nations Economic Commission for Africa
- In office October 14, 2019 – February 1, 2023
- President: Donald Trump; Joe Biden
- Preceded by: Mary Beth Leonard
- Succeeded by: Stephanie S. Sullivan

Personal details
- Born: Jessica Erin Lapenn New York City, United States
- Education: Harvard College (BA); Cambridge University
- Nickname: Jessye

Jessica "Jessye" Lapenn is an American diplomat. A career member of the Senior Foreign Service who holds the rank of Minister-Counselor, she was sworn in as the U.S. Ambassador to the African Union and the U.S. Permanent Representative to the United Nations Economic Commission for Africa on August 27, 2019. Immediately prior, Lapenn served as the Chargé d'Affaires at U.S. Mission in South Africa from 2016 to 2019.

== Biography ==
Born and raised in New York City, Lapenn earned a BA in Women's Studies from Harvard College and an MPhil in International Development from Cambridge University.
