= Christopher W. Murray =

American diplomat

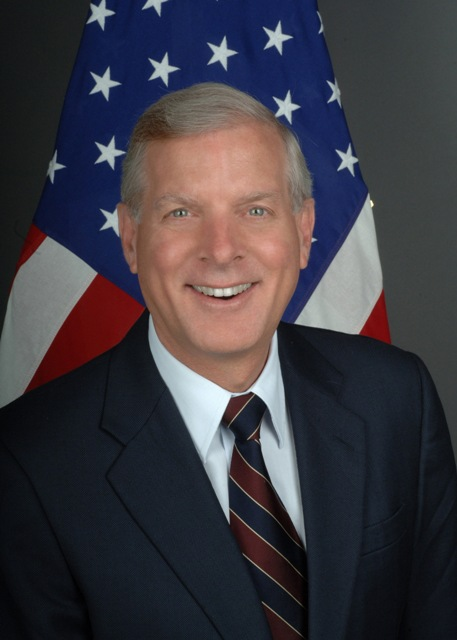
Christopher W Murray ambassador

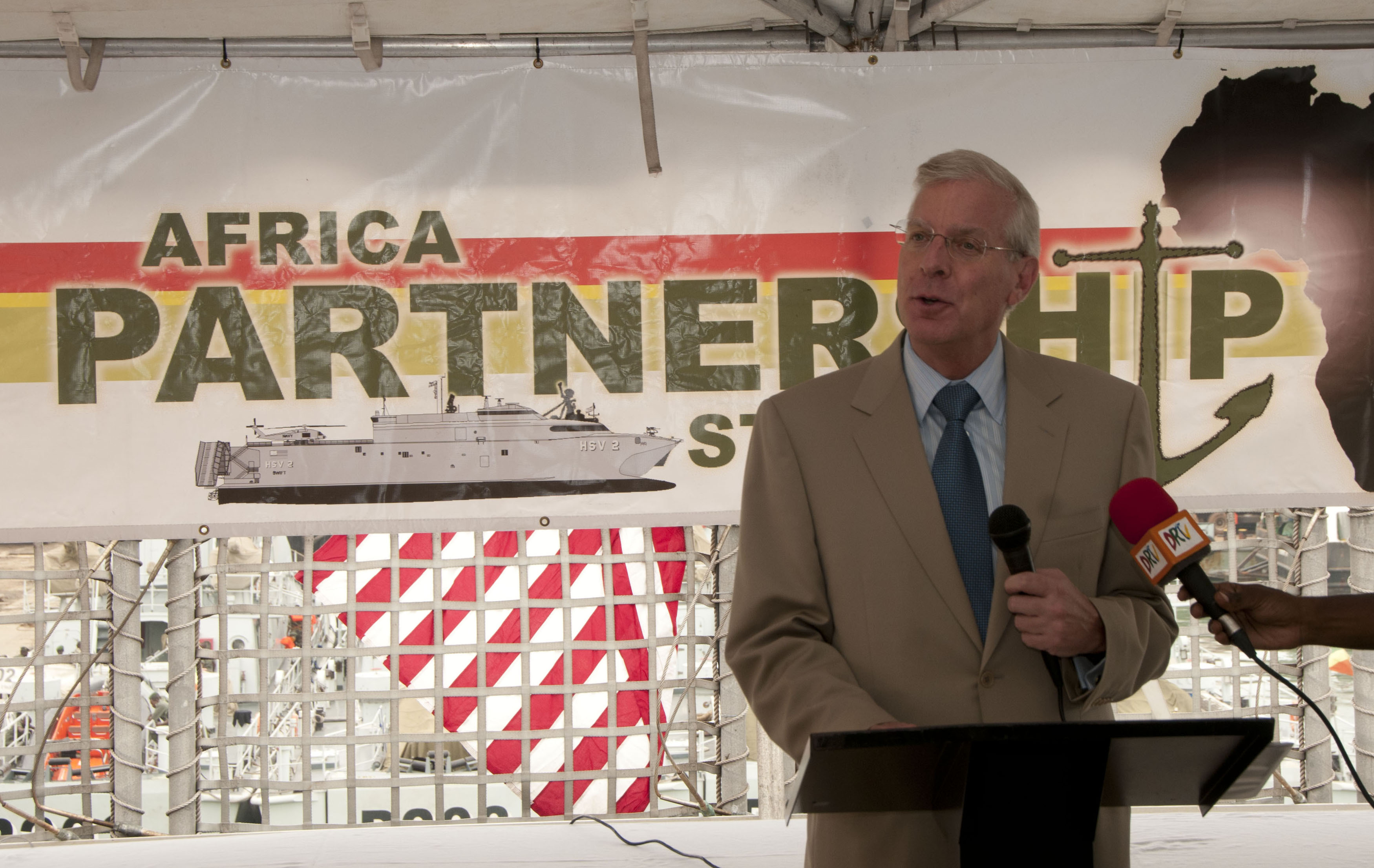
US Navy 110719-N-XK513-157 U.S. Ambassador to the Republic of the Congo Christopher W. Murray delivers remarks aboard High Speed Vessel Swift (HSV

Christopher W. Murray (born 1953) was the United States Ambassador to the Republic of the Congo from 2010 until 2013.

Murray graduated from Lawrence University in 1975.
