= List of female ambassadors of the United States =

This is a list of women who are or have ever been ambassadors of the United States.

Incumbent

== List ==
Name	Picture	Post	Term start	Term end
Ruth Bryan Owen		United States Ambassador to Denmark	May 29, 1933	June 27, 1936
Eugenie Anderson		United States ambassador to Denmark	December 22, 1949	January 19, 1953
Clare Boothe Luce	Clare boothe	United States ambassador to Italy	May 4, 1953	December 27, 1956
Frances E. Willis		United States Ambassador to Switzerland	July 20, 1953	May 5, 1957
Frances E. Willis		United States Ambassador to Norway	May 20, 1957	May 15, 1961
Frances E. Willis		United States Ambassador to Sri Lanka	March 15, 1961	September 20, 1964
Margaret Joy Tibbetts		United States ambassador to Norway	October 6, 1964	May 23, 1969
Patricia Roberts Harris		United States Ambassador to Luxembourg	June 4, 1965	September 22, 1967
Carol C. Laise		United States Ambassador to Nepal	September 19, 1966	June 5, 1973
Eileen R. Donovan		United States ambassador to Barbados	September 5, 1969	August 3, 1974
Shirley Temple		United States Ambassador to Ghana	December 6, 1974	July 13, 1976
Anne L. Armstrong		United States ambassador to the United Kingdom	March 17, 1976	March 3, 1977
Anne Cox Chambers		United States ambassador to Belgium	June 17, 1977	January 17, 1981
Sally Shelton-Colby		United States ambassador to Barbados	June 7, 1979	February 24, 1981
Jeane Kirkpatrick		United States ambassador to the United Nations	February 4, 1981	April 1, 1985
Jane Abell Coon		United States ambassador to Bangladesh	June 30, 1981	August 3, 1984
Harriet Winsar Isom (acting)		United States ambassador to Laos	August 1986	August 1989
Shirley Temple		United States Ambassador to Czechoslovakia	August 23, 1989	July 12, 1992
Julia Chang Bloch		United States ambassador to Nepal	September 22, 1989	May 20, 1993
Harriet Winsar Isom		United States ambassador to Benin	January 26, 1990	November 14, 1992
Jennifer C. Ward		United States ambassador to Niger	March 25, 1991	May 28, 1993
Mary Ann Casey		United States ambassador to Algeria	July 2, 1991	October 19, 1994
Harriet Winsar Isom		United States ambassador to Cameroon	August 17, 1992	January 15, 1996
Ruth A. Davis		United States ambassador to Benin	August 17, 1992	November 3, 1995
Madeleine Albright		United States ambassador to the United Nations	January 27, 1993	January 21, 1997
Geraldine Ferraro		United States ambassador to the United Nations Human Rights Council	March 4, 1993	October 11, 1996
Harriet C. Babbitt		United States ambassador to the Organization of American States	April 12, 1993	November 30, 1997
Jean Kennedy Smith		United States Ambassador to Ireland	June 24, 1993	September 17, 1998
Pamela Harriman		United States Ambassador to France	June 30, 1993	February 5, 1997
Jeanette W. Hyde		United States Ambassador to Barbados and the Eastern Caribbean	April 14, 1994	January 31, 1998
Mary Ann Casey		United States ambassador to Tunisia	July 5, 1994	July 18, 1997
Donna Hrinak		United States ambassador to the Dominican Republic	July 22, 1994	December 8, 1997
Elizabeth Frawley Bagley		United States ambassador to Portugal	September 21, 1994	October 3, 1997
Prudence Bushnell		United States ambassador to Kenya	September 2, 1996	May 22, 1999
Lindy Boggs		United States Ambassador to the Holy See	December 16, 1997	March 1, 2001
Donna Hrinak		United States ambassador to Bolivia	January 14, 1998	July 17, 2000
Carolyn Curiel		United States ambassador to Belize	January 19, 1998	March 1, 2001
Barbro Owens-Kirkpatrick		United States ambassador to Niger	September 10, 1999	July 12, 2002
Carol Moseley Braun		United States Ambassador to New Zealand	December 15, 1999	March 1, 2001
Carol Moseley Braun		United States Ambassador to Samoa	February 8, 2000	March 1, 2001
Donna Hrinak		United States ambassador to Venezuela	August 25, 2000	January 23, 2002
Mary Ann Peters		United States ambassador to Bangladesh	September 15, 2000	June 19, 2003
Janet A. Sanderson		United States ambassador to Algeria	October 30, 2000	May 13, 2003
Pamela E. Bridgewater		United States ambassador to Benin	November 24, 2000	December 10, 2002
Donna Hrinak		United States ambassador to Brazil	April 23, 2002	June 26, 2004
Gail D. Mathieu		United States ambassador to Niger	October 3, 2002	September 30, 2005
Mary Kramer		United States Ambassador to Barbados and the Eastern Caribbean	March 30, 2004	October 30, 2006
Cynthia Efird		United States ambassador to Angola	August 31, 2004	June 6, 2007
Anne W. Patterson		United States ambassador to the United Nations (acting)	January 20, 2005	August 2, 2005
Catherine Todd Bailey		United States ambassador to Latvia	January 20, 2005	February 4, 2008
Marie Yovanovitch		United States ambassador to Kyrgyzstan	February 4, 2005	February 4, 2008
Michele J. Sison		United States ambassador to the United Arab Emirates	February 7, 2005	January 19, 2008
Victoria Nuland		United States permanent representative to NATO	June 20, 2005	May 2, 2008
Pamela E. Bridgewater		United States ambassador to Ghana	October 11, 2005	June 10, 2008
Patricia A. Butenis		United States ambassador to Bangladesh	April 13, 2006	June 23, 2007
Gayleatha B. Brown		United States ambassador to Benin	July 25, 2006	August 22, 2009
Bernadette Allen		United States ambassador to Niger	February 21, 2006	January 15, 2010
Jeanine Jackson		United States ambassador to Burkina Faso	March 24, 2006	March 7, 2009
Karen B. Stewart		United States ambassador to Belarus	October 24, 2006	March 12, 2008
Mary M. Ourisman		United States Ambassador to Barbados and the Eastern Caribbean	November 7, 2006	January 16, 2009
Cindy Courville		United States ambassador to the African Union	December 22, 2006	June 1, 2008
Gail D. Mathieu		United States ambassador to Namibia	November 15, 2007	September 4, 2010
Eunice Reddick		United States ambassador to Gabon	December 6, 2007	July 18, 2010
Michele J. Sison		United States ambassador to Lebanon	January 25, 2008	August 9, 2010
Eunice Reddick		United States ambassador to São Tomé and Príncipe	April 15, 2008	July 18, 2010
Liliana Ayalde		United States ambassador to Paraguay	August 11, 2008	August 5, 2011
Marie Yovanovitch		United States ambassador to Armenia	September 22, 2008	June 9, 2011
Susan Rice		United States ambassador to the United Nations	January 26, 2009	June 30, 2013
Laurie S. Fulton		United States Ambassador to Denmark	July 15, 2009	February 15, 2013
Gayleatha B. Brown		United States ambassador to Burkina Faso (acting)	August 4, 2009	August 5, 2010
Patricia A. Butenis		United States ambassador to Sri Lanka and the Maldives	August 19, 2009	June 29, 2012
Vilma Socorro Martínez		United States ambassador to Argentina	September 18, 2009	July 4, 2013
Nicole Avant		United States ambassador to The Bahamas	October 22, 2009	November 21, 2011
Anne S. Andrew		United States ambassador to Costa Rica	January 12, 2010	June 13, 2013
Mari Carmen Aponte		United States ambassador to El Salvador	September 27, 2010	January 2, 2011
Mari Carmen Aponte		United States ambassador to El Salvador	August 21, 2012	February 7, 2016
Bisa Williams		United States ambassador to Niger	October 29, 2010	September 13, 2013
Pamela E. Bridgewater		United States ambassador to Jamaica	November 3, 2010	November 25, 2013
Karen B. Stewart		United States ambassador to Laos	November 16, 2010	August 8, 2013
Jeanine Jackson		United States ambassador to Malawi	May 5, 2011	September 25, 2014
Mary Beth Leonard		United States ambassador to Mali	November 22, 2011	September 22, 2014
Gina Abercrombie-Winstanley		United States ambassador to Malta	May 2, 2012	January 26, 2016
Michele J. Sison		United States ambassador to Sri Lanka and the Maldives	September 9, 2012	December 6, 2014
Rosemary DiCarlo		United States ambassador to the United Nations (acting)	June 30, 2013	August 5, 2013
Samantha Power		United States ambassador to the United Nations	August 5, 2013	January 20, 2017
Denise Bauer		United States ambassador to Belgium	September 26, 2013	January 20, 2017
Liliana Ayalde		United States ambassador to Brazil	October 31, 2013	January 3, 2017
Caroline Kennedy		United States ambassador to Japan	November 19, 2013	January 18, 2017
Helen La Lime		United States ambassador to Angola	May 15, 2014	November 24, 2017
Eunice Reddick		United States ambassador to Niger	September 12, 2014	January 25, 2018
Joan A. Polaschik		United States ambassador to Algeria	October 29, 2014	April 27, 2017
Nina Hachigian		United States Ambassador to the Association of Southeast Asian Nations	November 3, 2014	January 20, 2017
Cynthia Akuetteh		United States ambassador to Gabon	December 26, 2014	February 26, 2018
Maureen Cormack		United States Ambassador to Bosnia and Herzegovina	January 16, 2015	January 16, 2019
Cynthia Akuetteh		United States ambassador to São Tomé and Príncipe	April 10, 2015	February 26, 2018
Virginia E. Palmer		United States ambassador to Malawi	February 27, 2015	June 7, 2019
Jennifer Zimdahl Galt		United States Ambassador to Mongolia	October 5, 2015	March 29, 2018
Laura Farnsworth Dogu		United States Ambassador to Nicaragua	October 6, 2015	October 30, 2018
Lucy Tamlyn		United States ambassador to Benin	October 23, 2015	October 17, 2018
Patricia Alsup		United States Ambassador to the Gambia	January 13, 2016	September 22, 2018
Linda Swartz Taglialatela		United States Ambassador to Barbados, the Eastern Caribbean and the OECS	February 1, 2016	December 27, 2023
Jean Elizabeth Manes		United States ambassador to El Salvador	March 30, 2016	July 31, 2019
Karen B. Stewart		United States Ambassador to the Marshall Islands	July 25, 2016	January 27, 2020
Marie Yovanovitch		United States Ambassador to Ukraine	August 29, 2016	May 20, 2019
Mary Beth Leonard		United States ambassador to the African Union	September 13, 2016	September 14, 2019
Adrienne Galanek		U.S. Chargé d'Affaires for Belize	January 20, 2017	July 21, 2018
Michele J. Sison		United States ambassador to the United Nations (acting)	January 20, 2017	January 27, 2017
Herro Mustafa		United States chargé d'affaires to Portugal	January 20, 2017	August 25, 2017
Nikki Haley		United States ambassador to the United Nations	January 27, 2017	December 31, 2018
Kay Bailey Hutchison		United States Ambassador to NATO	August 28, 2017	January 20, 2021
Maria E. Brewer		United States Ambassador to Sierra Leone	October 5, 2017	February 22, 2021
Carla Sands		United States Ambassador to Denmark	November 2, 2017	January 20, 2021
Callista Gingrich		United States Ambassador to the Holy See	December 22, 2017	January 20, 2021
Nina Maria Fite		United States ambassador to Angola	February 14, 2018	November 8, 2021
Michele J. Sison		United States Ambassador to Haiti	February 21, 2018	October 9, 2021
Mara Tekach		United States Ambassador to Cuba (acting)	July 20, 2018	July 21, 2020
Jenifer H. Moore		United States ambassador to Belarus (acting)	August 17, 2018	July 27, 2020
Judy Rising Reinke		United States ambassador to Montenegro	December 20, 2018	January 16, 2026
Lucy Tamlyn		United States Ambassador to the Central African Republic	February 6, 2019	January 28, 2022
Lynne M. Tracy		United States ambassador to Armenia	March 1, 2019	December 22, 2022
Eunice Reddick		United States Chargé d’Affaires to Burundi	May 5, 2019	March 2, 2021
Patricia Mahoney		United States ambassador to Benin	July 4, 2019	February 1, 2022
Melissa A. Brown		Ambassador of the United States to the Association of Southeast Asian Nations (acting)	August 2019	March 31, 2022
Bridget A. Brink		United States Ambassador to Slovakia	August 20, 2019	May 18, 2022
Kelly Craft		United States ambassador to the United Nations	September 12, 2019	January 20, 2021
Jessica Lapenn		United States ambassador to the African Union	October 14, 2019	February 1, 2023
Herro Mustafa		United States ambassador to Bulgaria	October 18, 2019	March 1, 2023
Mary Beth Leonard		United States ambassador to Nigeria	December 24, 2019	March 31, 2023
Kelley Eckels Currie		United States Ambassador-at-Large for Global Women's Issues	January 14, 2020	January 20, 2021
Yuri Kim		United States Ambassador to Albania	January 27, 2020	June 25, 2023
Roxanne Cabral		United States Ambassador to the Marshall Islands	February 6, 2020	March 3, 2023
Alina Romanowski		United States Ambassador to Kuwait	February 11, 2020	April 15, 2022
Jessica Davis Ba		United States Ambassador to Chad (acting)	May 1, 2020	November 8, 2021
Charisse Phillips		United States Chargé d'affaires to Bolivia	August 26, 2020	October 7, 2022
Sandra E. Clark		United States ambassador to Burkina Faso	September 25, 2020	December 18, 2023
Julie D. Fisher		United States ambassador to Belarus	December 23, 2020	June 9, 2022
MaryKay Carlson		United States ambassador to Argentina (acting)	January 20, 2021	January 24, 2022
Yael Lempert		U.S. Chargé d’Affaires to the United Kingdom	January 20, 2021	August 1, 2021
Martina A. Strong		U.S. Chargé d’Affaires to Saudi Arabia	January 20, 2021	April 16, 2023
Linda Thomas-Greenfield		United States ambassador to the United Nations	February 25, 2021	January 20, 2025
Melanie Harris Higgins		United States Ambassador to Burundi	March 2, 2021	July 13, 2023
Leyla Moses-Ones		U.S. Chargé d'Affaires for Belize	August 2021	December 5, 2022
Cindy McCain		United States Ambassador to the United Nations Agencies for Food and Agriculture	November 5, 2021	April 5, 2023
Victoria Reggie Kennedy		United States Ambassador to Austria	January 12, 2022	January 20, 2025
Denise Bauer		United States Ambassador to France & United States Ambassador to Monaco	February 5, 2022	January 20, 2025
Elizabeth Moore Aubin		United States ambassador to Algeria	February 9, 2022	January 16, 2026
Claire D. Cronin		United States Ambassador to Ireland	February 10, 2022	January 20, 2025
Jamie Harpootlian		United States Ambassador to Slovenia	February 17, 2022	July 31, 2024
Amy Gutmann		United States Ambassador to Germany	February 17, 2022	July 13, 2024
Julie J. Chung		United States ambassador to Sri Lanka	February 25, 2022	January 16, 2026
Maria E. Brewer		United States Ambassador to Lesotho	March 10, 2022	April 12, 2024
Sharon L. Cromer		United States Ambassador to the Gambia	March 18, 2022	August 21, 2025
Patricia Mahoney		United States Ambassador to the Central African Republic	April 8, 2022	March 27, 2025
Laura Farnsworth Dogu		United States Ambassador to Honduras	April 12, 2022	April 18, 2025
Randi Levine		United States ambassador to Portugal	April 22, 2022	January 20, 2025
Elizabeth Fitzsimmons		United States Ambassador to Togo	April 26, 2022	May 30, 2024
Virginia E. Palmer		United States ambassador to Ghana	May 10, 2022	May 28, 2025
Caryn McClelland		United States Ambassador to Brunei	May 24, 2022	June 30, 2026
Bridget A. Brink		United States Ambassador to Ukraine	May 30, 2022	April 21, 2025
Alina Romanowski		United States Ambassador to Iraq	June 2, 2022	December 7, 2024
Claire A. Pierangelo		United States Ambassador to Madagascar	June 29, 2022	January 29, 2026
Jane D. Hartley		United States ambassador to the United Kingdom	July 19, 2022	January 20, 2025
MaryKay Carlson		United States Ambassador to the Philippines	July 22, 2022	January 16, 2026
Caroline Kennedy		United States Ambassador to Australia	July 25, 2022	November 28, 2024
Karen B. Decker		U.S. Chargé d'affaires for Afghanistan	August 1, 2022	July 28, 2025
Meg Whitman		United States Ambassador to Kenya	August 5, 2022	November 13, 2024
Bernadette Meehan		United States Ambassador to Chile	September 30, 2022	January 20, 2025
Carrin Patman		United States Ambassador to Iceland	October 6, 2022	January 18, 2025
Shefali Razdan Duggal		United States Ambassador to the Netherlands	October 19, 2022	January 20, 2025
Constance J. Milstein		United States ambassador to Malta	October 27, 2022	January 20, 2025
Angela Aggeler		United States Ambassador to North Macedonia	November 8, 2022	January 22, 2026
Mari Carmen Aponte		United States Ambassador to Panama	November 21, 2022	January 20, 2025
Marie C. Damour		United States Ambassador to Fiji	November 24, 2022	January 16, 2026
Michelle Kwan		United States ambassador to Belize	December 5, 2022	January 16, 2025
Candace Bond		United States Ambassador to Trinidad and Tobago	December 8, 2022	January 20, 2025
Lynne M. Tracy		United States Ambassador to Russia	January 30, 2023	June 27, 2025
Elizabeth Frawley Bagley		United States ambassador to Brazil	February 3, 2023	January 20, 2025
Lucy Tamlyn		United States Ambassador to the Democratic Republic of the Congo	February 6, 2023	December 31, 2025
Kathleen A. Kavalec		United States Ambassador to Romania	February 14, 2023	May 20, 2025
Julie D. Fisher		United States Ambassador to Cyprus	February 21, 2023	May 14, 2026
Kristina Kvien		United States ambassador to Armenia	February 21, 2023	January 16, 2026
Jessica Davis Ba		United States Ambassador to Ivory Coast	March 2, 2023	January 16, 2026
Rachna Korhonen		United States ambassador to Mali	March 16, 2023	September 5, 2026
Heide B. Fulton		United States Ambassador to Uruguay	March 22, 2023	June 27, 2025
Kathleen A. FitzGibbon		United States ambassador to Niger	August 19, 2023	January 16, 2026
Yael Lempert		United States Ambassador to Jordan	September 3, 2023	January 20, 2025
Adrienne Galanek		U.S. Chargé d'Affaires for Guyana	September 13, 2023	October 23, 2023
Jennifer L. Johnson		United States Ambassador to the Federated States of Micronesia	September 13, 2023	June 9, 2026
Martina A. Strong		United States Ambassador to the United Arab Emirates	October 4, 2023	August 5, 2025
Robin Dunnigan		United States Ambassador to Georgia	October 12, 2023	July 15, 2025
Nicole D. Theriot		United States Ambassador to Guyana	October 23, 2023	Incumbent
Herro Mustafa		United States Ambassador to Egypt	November 15, 2023	January 17, 2026
Nicole Shampaine		United States Permanent Representative to the Organisation for the Prohibition of Chemical Weapons	April 12, 2024	Incumbent
Nina Maria Fite		U.S. Chargé d'Affaires for Moldova	July 10, 2024	September 19, 2024
Dorothy Shea		U.S. Chargé d'Affaires for United Nations	January 20, 2025	September 21, 2025
Callista Gingrich		United States Ambassador to Switzerland and Liechtenstein	October 23, 2025	Incumbent
Asel Roberts		United States Ambassador to Slovenia	June 15, 2026	Incumbent

== Bibliography ==
- "Women in Diplomacy: FY 2005 Performance and Accountability Report". Bureau of Resource Management, US Department of State. November 2005.

== See also ==
- Ambassadors of the United States
