= Francis Terry McNamara =

American diplomat

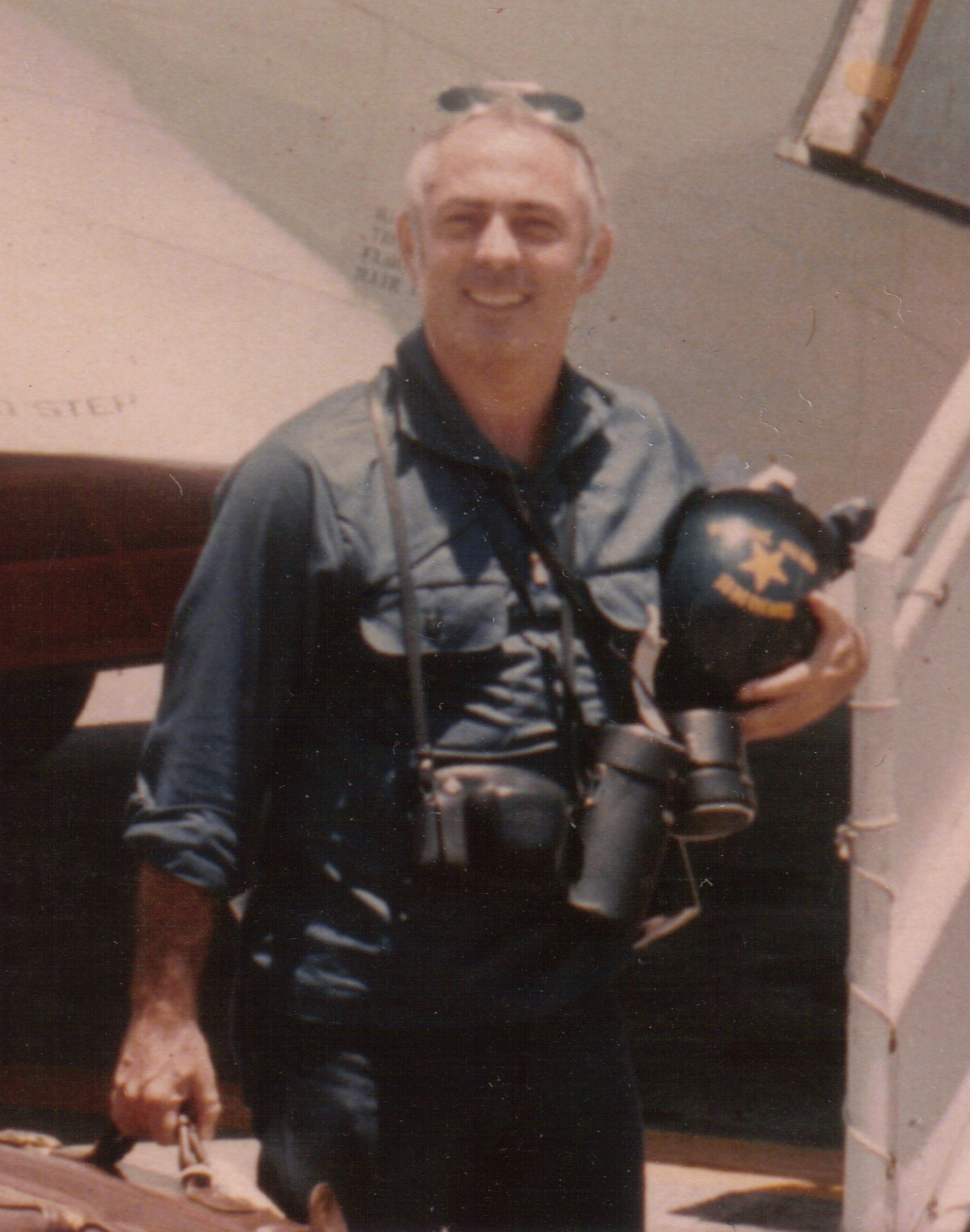

9th United States Ambassador to Gabon
- In office January 19, 1982 – August 3, 1984
- President: Ronald Reagan
- Preceded by: Arthur T. Tienken
- Succeeded by: Larry C. Williamson

3rd United States Ambassador to São Tomé and Príncipe
- In office July 26, 1982 – August 3, 1984
- President: Ronald Reagan
- Preceded by: Arthur T. Tienken
- Succeeded by: Larry C. Williamson

6th United States Ambassador to Cape Verde
- In office December 23, 1989 – December 31, 1992
- President: Ronald Reagan; George H. W. Bush
- Preceded by: Vernon Dubois Penner, Jr.
- Succeeded by: Joseph Monroe Segars

Personal details
- Born: November 2, 1927 (age 99) Troy, New York
- Education: Russell Sage College (B.A.); George Washington University (M.S.); McGill University; Syracuse University; Armed Forces Staff College; Naval War College
- Occupation: Diplomat
- Awards: Superior Honor Award (4); Meritorious Honor Award (3)

Military service
- Branch/service: United States Navy

Francis Terry McNamara (born November 2, 1927) is a retired career Foreign Service Officer, ambassador and author.

== Early life ==
Francis Terry McNamara was born in Troy, New York, November 2, 1927 to John F. McNamara, Sr. and Ellin F. Fennelly. Always fascinated by things nautical, he found a summer job in 1944 as a deckhand working on the last coal-burning tugboat on the Hudson River and Erie Canal (New York State Barge Canal).

Later the same year, an underaged McNamara convinced a Navy recruiter to sign him up, and he spent the latter part of World War II in the submarine service, being discharged in 1946. After the war, he entered Russell Sage College in Troy, New York. His education was again interrupted when he volunteered to return to active duty with the Navy during the Korean War, from 1950 to 1951.

Returning to college after Korea, Mr. McNamara graduated from Russell Sage College in January 1953 with a B.A. During this period, his summer breaks were spent at sea working as a merchant seaman. During the 1953–1954 academic year, he was engaged in graduate studies at McGill University in Canada. He continued these studies at Syracuse University from 1954 to 1956, while working for the State Bank of Albany, Albany, New York, and later as a management intern with the United States Army Ordnance Corps at the Watervliet Arsenal, Watervliet, New York.

== Foreign Service career ==
McNamara was commissioned in the United States Foreign Service in 1956. He would become an Africanist, eventually serving at seven African posts beginning in 1957 with his assignment to the U.S. Consulate General at Salisbury, Rhodesia. He was then assigned as an analyst in the African Division of the State Department's Bureau of Intelligence and Research. This assignment was followed, from 1961 to 1963, with a posting to the Congo's embattled breakaway province of Katanga. Returning to Africa in 1964, he served in Tanzania, and later as acting Deputy Chief of Mission at the American Embassy in Lusaka, Zambia. He then attended the Armed Forces Staff College in Norfolk, Virginia.

Volunteering for service in wartime Vietnam, he was sent in late 1967 to serve as a provincial adviser with the CORDS program, first in Vĩnh Long Province in the Mekong Delta and later in Quảng Trị Province in Central Vietnam. Continuing service in Vietnam, he was reassigned as the first principal officer in Danang, opening a new US Consulate there in 1969. He served concurrently as the political advisor to the commanding generals of III Marine Amphibious Force and the US Army's XXIV Corps. Leaving Vietnam in August 1971, he spent the 1971–72 academic year at the US Naval War College. While at the Naval War College, he earned a master's degree from George Washington University.

McNamara returned to Africa in 1972 as Deputy Chief of Mission, and later Chargé d'affaires at the American Embassy in Cotonou, Dahomey. Shortly after his arrival he witnessed a coup d'état. Suddenly ordered to return to Vietnam in July 1974 to occupy the post of Consul General in Cần Thơ, he was charged with all responsibilities for residual American programs and activities in the Mekong Delta region, both military and civilian. Concurrently, he was the American counterpart of the commanding general of South Vietnam's Army IV Corps. As the Saigon government collapsed in 1975, McNamara conceived, organized, and led an evacuation down the Mekong River at the helm of a small landing craft (LCM) carrying 300 Vietnamese consulate employees, members of their families, 18 Americans, and five Filipinos. Picked up at sea by a passing freighter, he became one of Vietnam's first "boat people". Following the American evacuation of Vietnam, he was appointed associate director of the Task Force for Resettlement of Indochinese Refugees in the United States.

McNamara then went to Quebec City as consul general during the separatist Parti Québécois' first challenge to Canadian unity. This assignment was followed with an academic year (1979–1980) in the Foreign Service Institute's Executive Seminar in National and International Affairs (formerly the Senior Seminar). In 1980 he was named Deputy Assistant Secretary of State for Public Affairs. During this tour, he organized the State Department's bicentennial celebrations. In December 1981, McNamara was appointed United States Ambassador to Gabon and São Tomé and Príncipé.

Following his ambassadorship in Gabon, McNamara spent a year as a foreign affairs fellow at the Hoover Institution in Stanford University. His year in academia was followed by a posting in 1985 as Deputy Chief of Mission in Beirut at the peak of the Lebanese Civil War. During his two-year tour in Beirut, he also often served as chargé d'affaires. Upon his return from Lebanon, he was granted a two-year sabbatical, which was spent as senior research fellow at the National Defense University finishing a scholarly work begun at the Hoover Institution entitled France in Black Africa.

McNamara's twilight tour as a Foreign Service Officer came in 1989 with his appointment as US Ambassador to Cape Verde. While he was there, the country held its first free election, which resulted in the defeat of a moderately Marxist government. He retired in 1993 after 41 years of service.

== Later work ==
After his retirement from the Foreign Service, McNamara continued to work part-time at the State Department for more than 25 years as the chairman of a panel adjudicating Freedom of Information Act appeals to previous departmental decisions. He also supervised elections in the Balkans, Africa and Falls Church, Virginia. As a veteran of six wars, a coup d'état and three evacuations, he consulted with the US Army's Battle Command Training Program (BCTP) and the Marines' Mission Command Training Program (MCTP) working as a subject matter expert and mentor helping to train Army and Marine commanders and their staffs for service in Iraq, Afghanistan, the Balkans, Africa, South Korea and Japan. He also worked with the Jet Propulsion Laboratory at the California Institute of Technology as an advisor on asymmetric warfare.

In 2003, McNamara went with a joint task force to Liberia as Political Advisor to the commanding general. JTF Liberia deployed in support of a West African force in its successful effort to end civil war in chronically troubled Liberia.

== Awards ==
In recognition of his service, the State Department awarded the Ambassador four Superior Honor Awards and three Meritorious Honor Awards for acts or qualities ranging from bravery to "unusual political acuity". For his World War II and Korean War service in the US Navy, he was awarded various campaign medals. Russell Sage College, his alma mater, granted him an honorary doctorate in 1988.

== Publications ==
McNamara's assignment to Cần Thơ, Vietnam was the basis of Escape with Honor: My Last Hours In Vietnam, written with former British diplomat Adrian Hill (Washington, D.C., Brassey's Memories of War Series, 1997). It is a vivid account of the final days of the U.S. Consulate at Can Tho, and the harrowing evacuation with his U.S. and Vietnamese employees and dependents by boat down the Bassac River on April 29–30, 1975 during the American evacuation of South Vietnam.

His publications also include France in Black Africa (Washington, DC: National Defense University Press, 1989), a standard work in English on France's unusually close relations with its former African colonies.

== Family ==
McNamara is married to the former Cong Tang Ton Nu Nhu De, and has seven children. He lives in Arlington, Virginia.

Diplomatic posts
Preceded by Arthur T. Tienken	United States Ambassador to Gabon; 1982–1984	Succeeded by Larry C. Williamson
Preceded by Arthur T. Tienken	United States Ambassador to São Tomé and Príncipe; 1982–1984	Succeeded by Larry C. Williamson
Preceded by Vernon Dubois Penner, Jr.	United States Ambassador to Cape Verde; 1989–1992	Succeeded by Joseph Monroe Segars
