= American International School of Libreville =

Coordinates: 0.419428°N 9.430810°E

Location
- Libreville; Gabon

Information
- Established: 1975; 50 years ago
- Grades: Pre-Kindergarten - Grade 12
- Affiliation: United States Embassy

American International School of Libreville (AISL) is an American international school in Libreville, Gabon. The U.S. Embassy in Gabon sponsors the school. It serves grades pre-kindergarten through grade 12, and was founded in 1975 at the request of the U.S. Ambassador to Gabon, Andrew Lee Steigman. The school's student body for the year 2015–2016 was 26. As of 2015, there were no eleventh and twelfth graders at the school.

== See also ==
- Education in Gabon
- List of international schools
