= Embassy of the United States, Libreville =

Diplomatic mission of the United States of America to the Gabonese Republic

- Location: Libreville, Gabon
- Address: Sablière B.P. 4000 Libreville, Gabon
- Coordinates: 0°28′59.9″N 9°23′41.3″E
- Jurisdiction: Gabon
- Website: https://ga.usembassy.gov

The Embassy of the United States in Libreville is the diplomatic mission of the United States of America in Gabon.

== History ==
The United States recognized Gabon on August 17, 1960, on the day Gabon proclaimed independence from French Equatorial Africa. Diplomatic relations were established on the same date when Alan W. Lukens, who was resident at Brazzaville, presented his credentials as Chargé d'Affaires ad interim. The Embassy of the United States in Libreville was officially established on March 20, 1961, with Walker A. Diamanti serving as the Chargé d'Affaires ad interim. The embassy was bombed in two incidents in early March 1964, when the United States was mistakenly blamed for influencing the 1964 Gabonese coup d'état. The Embassy moved to its current location in the Sabliere neighborhood in 2012.

== See also ==
- Gabon–United States relations
- List of ambassadors of the United States to Gabon
