= Funkhouser =

Funkhouser may refer to:

== People ==
- Barbara Funkhouser (1930–2014), an American journalist, newspaper editor, and writer
- Erica Funkhouser, American poet
- Howard G. Funkhouser (1898–1984) American mathematician
- Kyle Funkhouser (born 1994), American baseball player
- Mark Funkhouser (born 1949), mayor of Kansas City, Missouri
- Richard Funkhouser (1917–2008), American diplomat and oil expert, son of Edgar

== Places ==
- Funkhouser, Illinois, United States
- Morgantown, Kentucky, United States, possibly originally named Funkhouser Hill

== Other ==
- Funkhouser (band), an American musical ensemble formed by members of American rock band Bridge to Grace
- Several characters from the comedy series Curb Your Enthusiasm
