= Gabon–United States relations =

- Gabon: United States

Gabon–United States relations are bilateral relations between Gabon and the United States.

== History ==
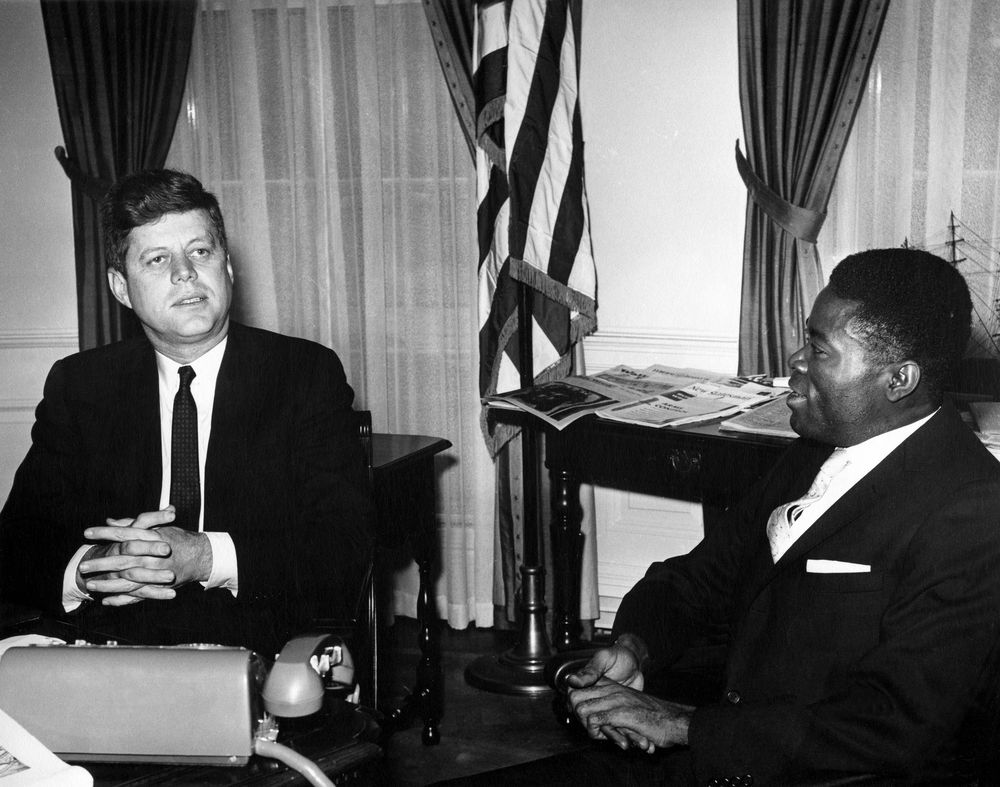
President John F. Kennedy with Ambassador of Gabon, Joseph Ngoua, 1961

U.S. private capital, almost if not entirely in the oil and natural resource sector, has been attracted to Gabon since before its independence. Relations between the United States and Gabon began following Gabon's independence from France in 1960. Despite Gabon's independence the two countries have remained close allies and during the 1960s France relied on Gabon as its sole source of Uranium and a major source of oil. In February 1964 French troops helped defeat an attempt to overthrow the Gabonese government during the 1964 Gabon coup d'état and French citizens spread rumors of American involvement in the coup which led to the 1964 United States Embassy in Libreville bombings.

Following Omar Bongo's coming to power in 1967 the U.S. continued diplomatic relations despite Bongo's autocratic tendencies. In 1987, President Bongo made an official visit to Washington, DC.

In September 2002, Secretary of State Colin Powell made a brief but historic visit to Gabon to highlight environmental protection and conservation in the Central Africa region. This was followed by a visit to the White House by President Bongo in May 2004. The United States imports a considerable percentage of Gabonese crude oil and manganese, and exports heavy construction equipment, aircraft, and machinery to Gabon. Through a modest International Military Education and Training program, the United States provides military training to members of the Gabonese armed forces each year. Other bilateral assistance includes the funding of small grants for qualified democracy and human rights, self-help, and cultural preservation projects.

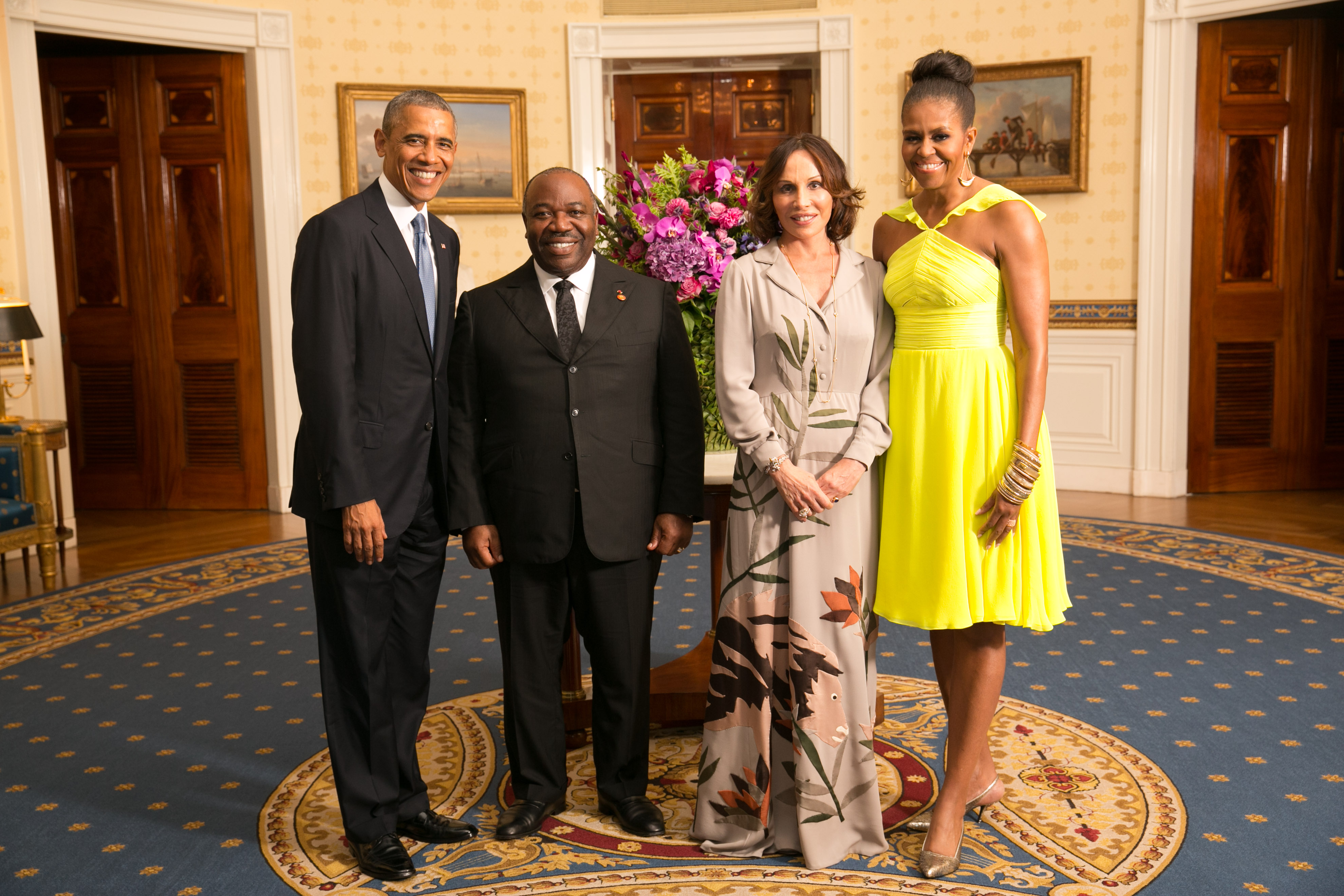
Ali Bongo Ondimba and his wife with the Obamas, 2014

During the 2016 Gabonese protests in the aftermath of the allegedly fraudulent Gabonese presidential election, 2016, the U.S. expressed "concern" over Gabon's mass arrests of opposition members and its support of the AU's mediation team.

== Embassy ==
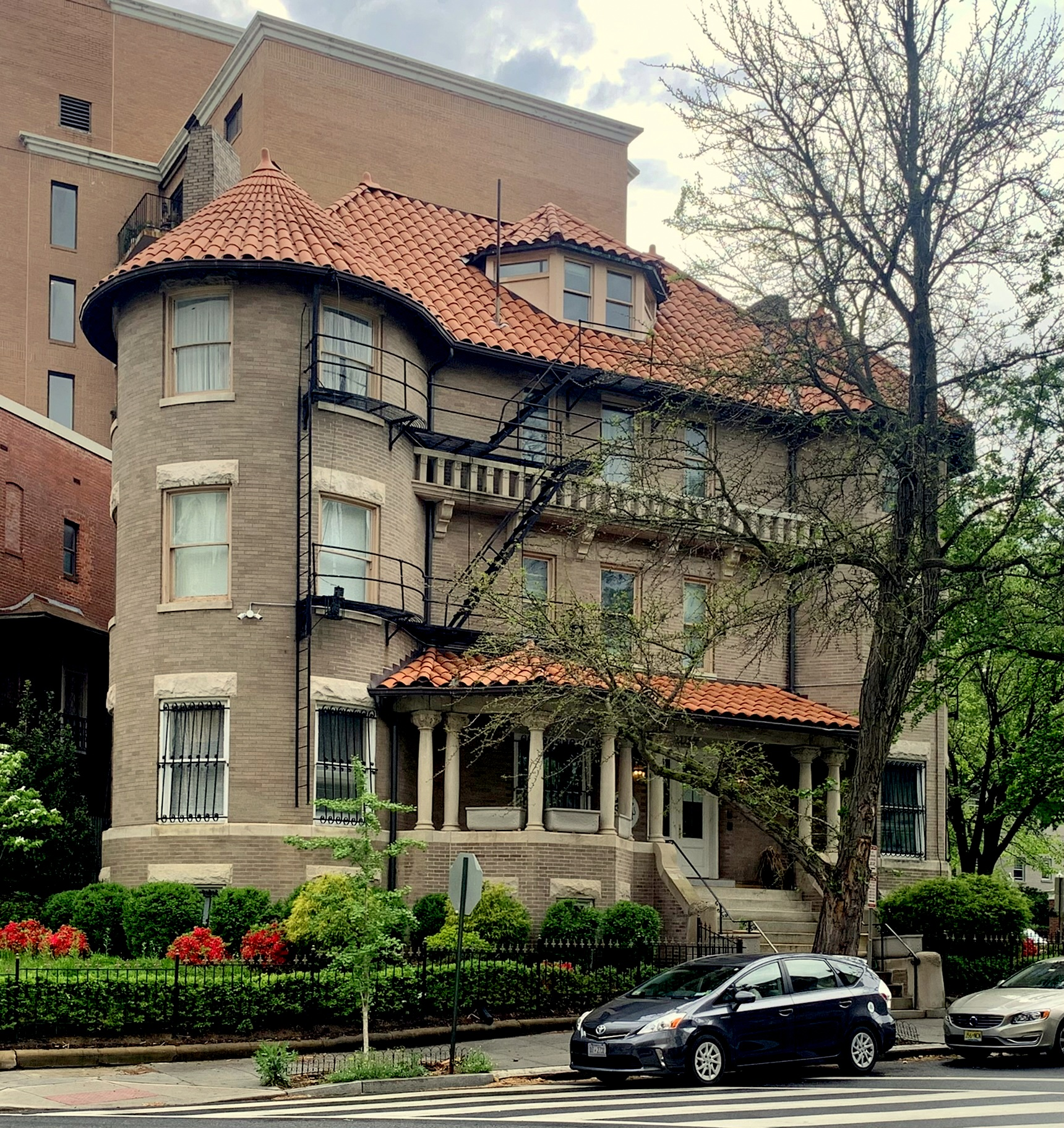
Embassy of Gabon in Washington, D.C.

Principal U.S. Officials include:

- Ambassador Vernelle FitzPatrick
- Deputy Chief of Mission David G. Mosby since September 2022.

The U.S. Embassy is located in Libreville, Gabon.

== See also ==
- Foreign relations of the United States
- Foreign relations of Gabon
