= Ifa Bayeza =

American playwright and producer

- Born: Wanda Williams; Trenton, New Jersey, United States
- Education: Lawrence High School; Harvard University
- Occupations: Plawright, author, producer, stage director
- Years active: 2000–present
- Notable work: The Ballad of Emmett Till
- Relatives: Ntozake Shange (sister); Bisa Williams (sister)
- Awards: 2010 Backstage Garland Award for Best Playwriting; 2009 Edgar Award For Best Play; 2007 Eugene O'Neill Playwrights Conference fellowship.; Fellowships: 2003 Arna Bontemps Centennial Writer’s Fellowship and the Tuck School Minority Business Executive Program (MBEP)

Ifa Bayeza (born Wanda Williams) is a playwright, producer, and conceptual theater artist. She wrote the play The Ballad of Emmett Till, which earned her the Edgar Award for Best Play in 2009. She is the sister of Ntozake Shange, and directed Shange's A Photograph: Lovers in Motion, which was a part of the Negro Ensemble Company's 2015 Year of the Woman Play Reading Series in New York City.

== Personal life ==
Bayeza was born Wanda Williams, into an upper middle-class African-American family in Trenton, New Jersey. She changed her name to Ifa Bayeza; she has stated that the name change was a way of claiming her heritage and described it as a rite of passage. Bayeza claimed that she was "embracing an Africanness that I didn't know, but I felt. But I still keep the essence of Wanda." She was raised by her parents, Paul T. Williams, a physician and fervent advocate for the underprivileged, and Eloise Williams, an educator and psychiatric social worker.

Bayeza grew up in the Lawrenceville section of Lawrence Township, Mercer County, New Jersey and graduated from Lawrence High School and Harvard University.

=== Family ===
Bayeza's family has a deep history of social justice work. Her siblings are: Ntozake Shange, a feminist playwright and poet; Paul Williams Jr., the first African American chief executive officer of the Dormitory Authority of the State of New York; and Bisa Williams (born Andrea Williams), a career foreign service officer who served as U.S. Ambassador to Niger from 2010 to 2013. All four siblings attended and graduated from Ivy League schools (Barnard, Harvard and Yale), and earned advanced degrees focusing respectively on foreign diplomacy, playwriting, poetry and law. Bayeza's parents shared an interest in the arts and encouraged her artistic education. Her family hosted prominent figures, musicians and artists in their homes in Trenton and Lawrenceville, including W. E. B. Du Bois, Muhammad Ali, Dizzy Gillespie, Chico Hamilton and Sonny Till.

== Career ==
Bayeza and Shange co-wrote Some Sing, Some Cry, a 600-page novel about seven generations of Black women and their personal identities. Her works for the stage include Amistad Voices, Club Harlem, Kid Zero, Homer G & the Rhapsodies, and The Ballad of Emmett Till.

The Ballad of Emmett Till is about a 14-year-old boy who was tortured and killed in rural Mississippi because he whistled at a white woman. This play led to Bayeza getting an artist-in-residence fellowship from Brown University's Rites and Reason Theater and Providence Black Repertory Theater. Amistad Voices is set in 1839, and is about 53 Africans who revolted on a Spanish slave ship, battling over the legality of slavery. Bayeza went to Ethiopia to work on a personal project, creating images of ancient religious sites along the Nile. She was the original set designer and original dramaturg for Shange's production of For Colored Girls at New Federal Theatre and The Public Theater.

== Awards ==
- 2009: Edgar Award for Best Play
- 2007: Eugene O'Neill Playwrights Conference fellowship
- 2003: Arna Bontemps Centennial Writer's Fellowship and the Tuck School Minority Business Executive Program (MBEP)
- 2010: Backstage Garland Award for Best Playwriting

== Critical reception: The Ballad of Emmett Till ==
Steve Oxman reviewed Bayeza's work on Variety.com, complimenting her work and her portrayal of Emmett Till by describing it as "extremely detailed and, while it maybe feels a touch idealized, it's also down to earth. She perfectly sets the stage for his whistle at a white woman as an act of innocence." However, Oxman wasn't a fan of journalist Jimmy Hicks, claiming that it felt like, "a dramatic cliche". In 2010, this play was performed at The Fountain Theatre in Los Angeles. The original director, Ben Bradley, was suddenly murdered, and the production was picked up by Shirley Jo Finney. In a review of the play, along with praising Finney's direction, Kathleen Foley opined that Bayeza's account made Till's fate even more harrowing, stating: "In that she succeeds, brilliantly. Make no mistake: You will be devastated."

The play was performed in San Diego's Ion Theatre in 2017. The performance was co-directed by Yolanda Franklin and Claudio Raygoza, and featured a six-character ensemble. In his review, David L. Coddon stated: "The last half-hour of this 95-minute production is the most gut-wrenching for an audience." He continued by saying that the play ends on a hopeful note that creates optimism for a new world.
