= Nii Akuetteh =

Ghanaian activist

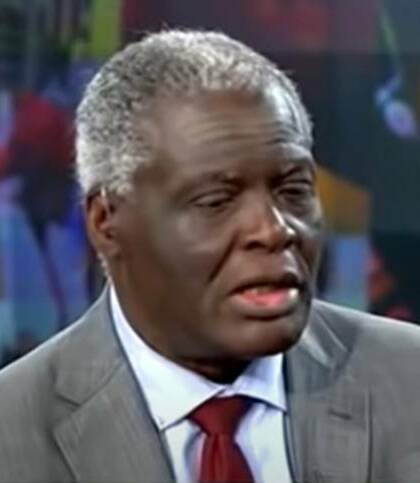
Akuetteh in 2017

Nii Akuetteh is a Ghanaian born policy analyst and activist. Akuetteh is the founder of the Democracy & Conflict Research Institute based in Accra, Ghana. He is the former executive director of Africa Action and Editor at TransAfrica.

He was married to Cynthia Archie Akuetteh, a U.S. diplomat and the former United States Ambassador to Gabon.

== Biography ==
During the 1980s, Akuetteh became involved in the anti-Apartheid movement in Washington, D.C.

Around 2000, Akuetteh moved to Nigeria, staying at Lagos and Abuja to create a grant-making foundation focused on the promulgation of democracy in West Africa.
