= Gail D. Mathieu =

American diplomat

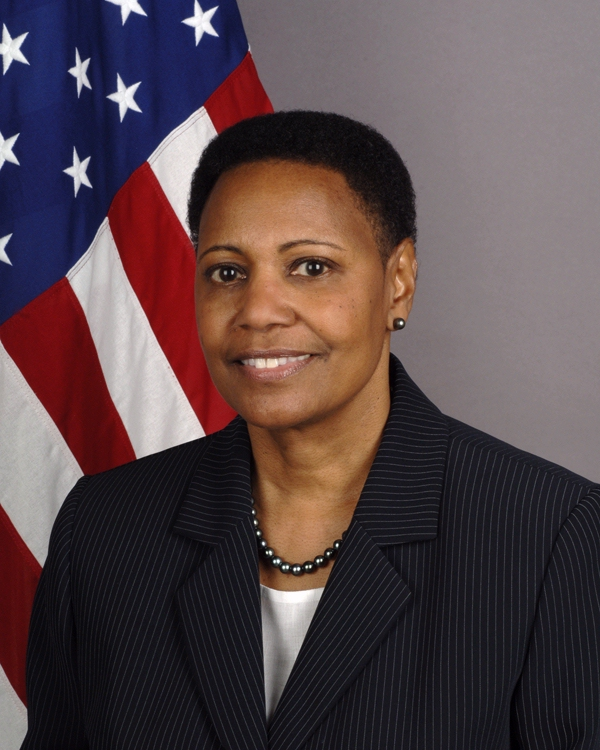

7th United States Ambassador to Namibia
- In office November 15, 2007 – September 4, 2010
- President: George W. Bush; Barack Obama
- Preceded by: Joyce Anne Barr
- Succeeded by: Wanda Nesbitt

16th United States Ambassador to Niger
- In office October 3, 2002 – September 30, 2005
- President: George W. Bush
- Preceded by: Barbro A. Owens-Kirkpatrick
- Succeeded by: Bernadette Allen

Personal details
- Born: 1951 (age 74–75)
- Education: Antioch College; Rutgers University-Newark

Gail Dennise Thomas Mathieu (born 1951) is the former political advisor to the Commander, United States Transportation Command, Scott Air Force Base, Illinois. She is the former United States Ambassador to Namibia and former United States Ambassador to Niger.

== Life and education ==
Mathieu is a native of New Jersey, but earned a B.A. degree from Antioch College. She returned to New Jersey and earned her J.D. degree from Rutgers University-Newark.

== Career ==
She was initially an assistant prosecutor for the city of Newark, New Jersey, but then began a career in the Foreign Service.

=== Other diplomatic posts ===
- 2013-2015 – Deputy Assistant Secretary of the Bureau of East Asian and Pacific Affairs for Australia, New Zealand and Pacific Island Affairs
- 1999–2002 – Deputy Chief of Mission in Accra, Ghana
- 1997–1999 – Deputy Director of the Office of West African Affairs
- 1995–1997 – Deputy Director of the Office of Pacific Island Affairs

Diplomatic posts
Preceded by Joyce Anne Barr	U.S. Ambassador to Namibia; 2007–2010	Succeeded by Wanda Nesbitt
Preceded by Barbro A. Owens-Kirkpatrick	U.S. Ambassador to Niger; 2002–2005	Succeeded by Bernadette M. Allen
