= Eric P. Whitaker =

American diplomat (born 1957)

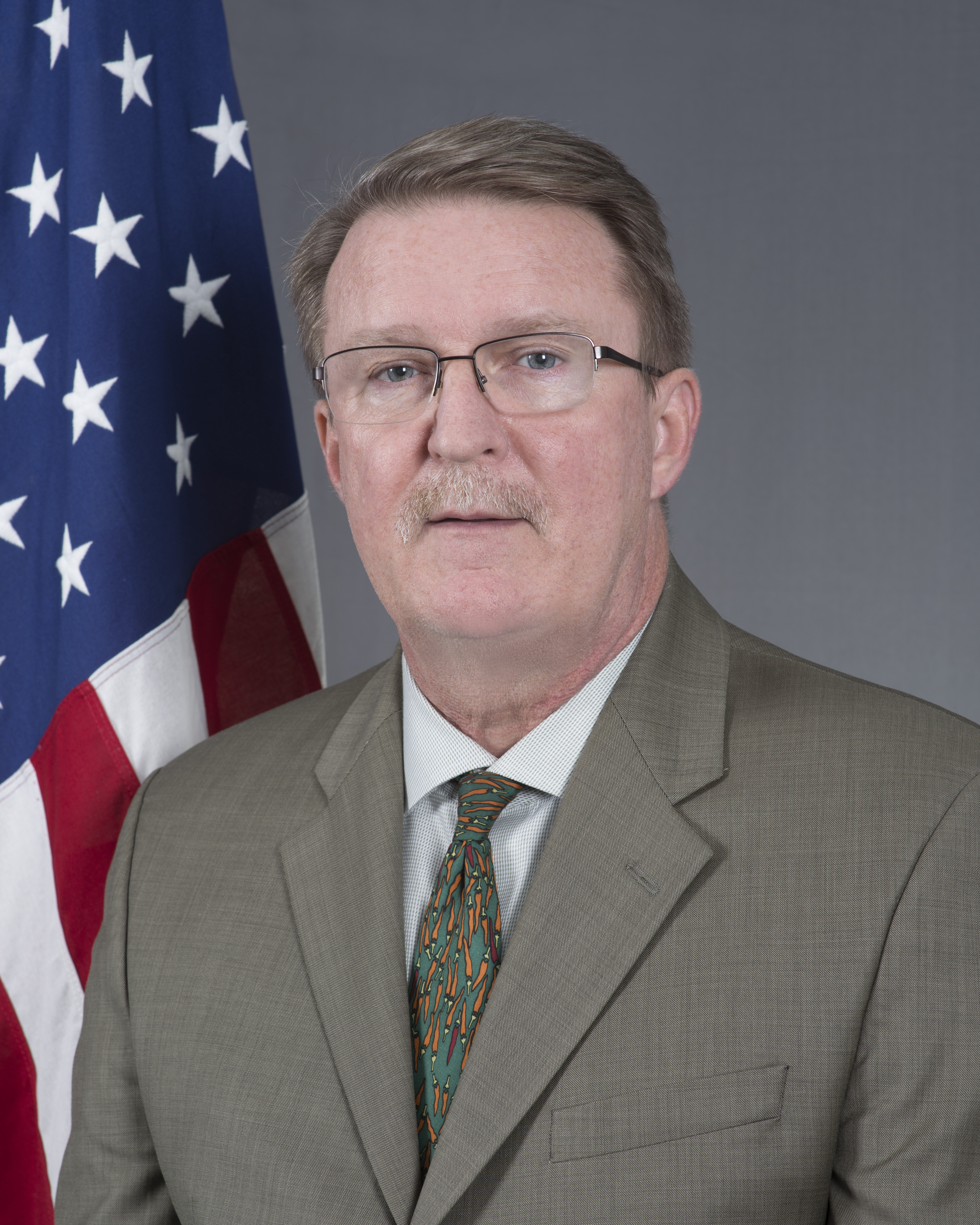

United States Ambassador to Niger
- In office January 26, 2018 – December 1, 2021
- President: Donald Trump; Joe Biden
- Preceded by: Eunice S. Reddick
- Succeeded by: Kathleen A. FitzGibbon

Personal details
- Born: January 24, 1957 (age 69) DeKalb, Illinois
- Education: University of Illinois at Urbana–Champaign; University of Pittsburgh; Princeton University

Eric Paul Whitaker (born January 24, 1957) is an American diplomat and career member of the Senior Foreign Service who served as the United States Ambassador to Niger from 2018 to 2021. He was sworn in on December 15, 2017 and presented his credentials to President Mahamadou Issoufou on January 26, 2018. He left office on December 1, 2021.

== Early life and education ==
Whitaker has a BS in biology and an MS in community health education from the University of Illinois, a Master of Public Administration degree from the University of Pittsburgh, and a Master of Public Policy degree from the Wilson School at Princeton University.

== Career ==
Whitaker has served as an American diplomat since 1990, including a tenure as the Acting Deputy Assistant Secretary for East Africa and the Sudans in the Bureau of African Affairs at the United States Department of State. A two-time deputy chief of mission, he has served at U.S. embassies in ten African countries and was a Peace Corps volunteer in the Philippines.

Whitaker has a BS in biology and an MS in community health education from the University of Illinois, a Master of Public Administration degree from the University of Pittsburgh, and a Master of Public Policy degree from the Wilson School at Princeton University.

== Personal life ==
Whitaker speaks Spanish, Portuguese, French, Visayan, and Korean.

Diplomatic posts
Preceded by Eunice S. Reddick	United States Ambassador to Niger; 2018–2021	Succeeded by Kathleen A. FitzGibbon
