= List of ambassadors of the United States to São Tomé and Príncipe =

Ambassador of the United States to São Tomé and Príncipe
- Seal of the United States Department of State

- Flag of a United States ambassador

- Incumbent; Shannon Nagy Cazeau; Chargé d'affaires since October 2, 2025
- Nominator: The president of the United States
- Inaugural holder: Andrew L. Steigman as Ambassador Extraordinary and Plenipotentiary
- Formation: December 11, 1975
- Website: U.S. Embassy - Luanda

The United States ambassador to São Tomé and Príncipe is the official representative of the government of the United States to the government of São Tomé and Príncipe. Until 2022, the ambassador was concurrently the ambassador to Gabon, while resident in Libreville. Beginning in 2022, representation for São Tomé and Príncipe was moved to Luanda, with the ambassador concurrently the ambassador to Angola, due to the countries' "longstanding cultural, linguistic, and economic ties."

== Ambassadors ==
Name	Title	Appointed	Presented credentials	Terminated mission	Notes
Andrew L. Steigman – Career FSO	Ambassador Extraordinary and Plenipotentiary	December 11, 1975	February 14, 1976	August 21, 1977	
Arthur T. Tienken – Career FSO	Ambassador Extraordinary and Plenipotentiary	February 2, 1978	May 26, 1978	July 19, 1981	
Francis Terry McNamara – Career FSO	Ambassador Extraordinary and Plenipotentiary	December 11, 1981	July 26, 1982	August 3, 1984	
Larry C. Williamson – Career FSO	Ambassador Extraordinary and Plenipotentiary	August 13, 1984	October 29, 1984	August 21, 1987	
Warren Clark Jr. – Career FSO	Ambassador Extraordinary and Plenipotentiary	August 10, 1987	October 19, 1987	August 24, 1989	
Keith Leveret Wauchope – Career FSO	Ambassador Extraordinary and Plenipotentiary	November 6, 1989	February 5, 1990	July 13, 1992	
Joseph Charles Wilson IV – Career FSO	Ambassador Extraordinary and Plenipotentiary	July 14, 1992	September 29, 1992	August 4, 1995	
Elizabeth Raspolic – Career FSO	Ambassador Extraordinary and Plenipotentiary	October 3, 1995	November 10, 1995	July 24, 1998	
James V. Ledesma – Career FSO	Ambassador Extraordinary and Plenipotentiary	October 22, 1998	January 27, 1999	June 18, 2001	The post was vacant June 2001–June 2002. Thomas F. Daughton served as Chargé d'Affaires ad interim in the interval.
Kenneth Price Moorfield – Career FSO	Ambassador Extraordinary and Plenipotentiary	January 30, 2002	June 20, 2002	July 31, 2004	
R. Barrie Walkley – Career FSO	Ambassador Extraordinary and Plenipotentiary	July 2, 2004	November 11, 2004	April 27, 2007	
Eunice S. Reddick – Career FSO	Ambassador Extraordinary and Plenipotentiary	October 29, 2007	December 6, 2007	July 18, 2010	
Eric D. Benjaminson – Career FSO	Ambassador Extraordinary and Plenipotentiary	September 15, 2010	December 3, 2010	May 21, 2013	
Cynthia Akuetteh – Career FSO	Ambassador Extraordinary and Plenipotentiary	August 1, 2014	April 10, 2015	February 26, 2018	
Joel Danies – Career FSO	Ambassador Extraordinary and Plenipotentiary	February 21, 2018	April 20, 2018	March 1, 2019	
Robert E. Whitehead – Career FSO	Chargé d’Affaires a.i.	March 1, 2019		August 17, 2020	
Tulinabo S. Mushingi – Career FSO	Ambassador Extraordinary and Plenipotentiary	December 18, 2021	August 10, 2022	October 2024	
James B. Story – Career FSO	Chargé d’Affaires a.i.	October 23, 2024		May 6, 2025	
Jeremy Neitzke – Career FSO	Chargé d’Affaires a.i.	May 6, 2025		June 3, 2025	
Noah Zaring – Career FSO	Chargé d’Affaires a.i.	June 3, 2025		October 2, 2025	
Shannon Nagy Cazeau – Career FSO	Chargé d’Affaires a.i.	October 2, 2025		Present	

== See also ==
- São Tomé and Príncipe – United States relations
- Foreign relations of São Tomé and Príncipe
- Ambassadors of the United States
