= Arthur T. Tienken =

American diplomat

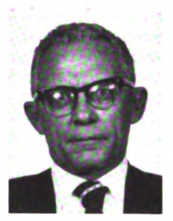

7th US Ambassador to Gabon
- In office February 3, 1978 – July 19, 1981
- President: Jimmy Carter
- Preceded by: Andrew L. Steigman
- Succeeded by: Francis Terry McNamara

2nd US Ambassador to São Tomé and Príncipe
- In office February 2, 1978 – July 19, 1981
- President: Jimmy Carter
- Preceded by: Andrew L. Steigman
- Succeeded by: Francis Terry McNamara

Personal details
- Born: Arthur Thomas Tienken; August 5, 1922 Yonkers, New York, US
- Died: May 7, 2006 (aged 83) Arlington, Virginia, US
- Education: Princeton University (BS, MS)
- Occupation: Diplomat

Arthur Thomas Tienken (August 5, 1922 – May 7, 2006) was an American career Foreign Service Officer who held concurrent ambassadorships to Gabon and São Tomé and Príncipe (1978–1981).

Tienken graduated from Princeton University, earning a bachelor's in 1946 (political science) and a master's in international relations at the Woodrow Wilson School of Public and International Affairs in 1950. Tienken entered with the Class of ‘44 but took time off from his studies, serving as a first lieutenant in the 3094th Quartermaster Company of the Western Pacific in the Philippines during World War II.

Tienken joined the Foreign Service in 1950. His first position was as a Kreis resident officer, or district governor, in Germany. He served in various the Belgian Congo, Mozambique, Zambia, Tuniasia and Ethiopia. He then spent four years at the embassy in Brussels. São Tomé and Príncipe achieved independence from Portugal on July 12, 1975, during Tienken's predecessor's time as ambassador. However, the ambassador of São Tomé and Príncipe served concurrently as the ambassador to Gabon until 2020.

Upon his return stateside, he attended the Naval War College in Newport, Rhode Island and was a diplomat-in-residence at Marquette University. He retired in 1987.

Tienken died of stomach cancer at his home.
