= Vernon Dubois Penner Jr. =

American diplomat

United States Ambassador to Cape Verde
- In office July 15, 1986 – November 21, 1989
- President: Ronald Reagan
- Preceded by: John Melvin Yates
- Succeeded by: Francis Terry McNamara

Personal details
- Born: October 20, 1939 (age 86) Brooklyn, New York, U.S.
- Education: Deep Springs College
- Occupation: Diplomat

Vernon DuBois Penner Jr. (born October 20, 1939) is a retired United States diplomat. He served as Ambassador to Cape Verde (1986–1990), as well as tours in Vietnam, Salzburg, Belgium, Frankfurt, Warsaw, Oporto, Zurich, Kobe-Osaka, and Rome. As Deputy Assistant Secretary of State, he was Director of the Visa Office in the State Department in Washington in 1983.

While ambassador in Cape Verde, he assisted with archeological discoveries relating to "17th-century Hebraic tombs and early 19th century grave markers of deceased US Navy seamen."

From 1997 to 2001, he was Deputy Commandant of the NATO Defense College in Rome, Italy. He speaks German, Polish, and Portuguese.

== Personal life ==
Penner is the son of Vernon DuBois Penner (1905-1987) and his wife, Edna Anna Johanna Burhenn (1903-1999). His ancestors include eight of the twelve Patentees, or founders, of New Paltz, New York, including Louis DuBois.

On July 6, 1963, in Smithtown, New York, Penner married Dorothy Anne Skripak (born May 2, 1942); together they have two children, Alexandra Suzanne and Robert DuBois Penner.
