= Richard Funkhouser =

American diplomat and geologist

Richard Edgar Funkhouser

United States Ambassador to Gabon
- In office August 9, 1969 – August 2, 1970
- President: Richard Nixon
- Preceded by: David M. Bane
- Succeeded by: John A. McKesson, III

Personal details
- Born: September 10, 1917 Trenton, New Jersey
- Died: May 15, 2008 (aged 90) Washington, D.C.
- Spouse: Phyllis
- Children: Philip (died 1961), Bruce, Blaine
- Profession: Diplomat; Geologist

Richard Edgar Funkhouser (September 10, 1917 – May 15, 2008) was an American diplomat and geologist, specializing in oil. He served as United States Ambassador to Gabon.

== Early years ==
Born in Trenton, New Jersey, he was the son of noted psychiatrist Dr. Edgar Bright Funkhouser and Evelyn Hayes. He attended Taft School before entering Princeton University, where he was a member of Phi Beta Kappa society and Sigma Xi, the Honorary Scientific Research Association. He graduated from Princeton with a bachelor's degree in geology in 1939 after completing a senior thesis, titled "Magnetic susceptibility of sedimentary minerals", under the supervision of Harry H. Hess.

== Career ==
Though Funkhouser had a deferment working as a geologist in Venezuela, he volunteered for the U.S. Army Air Corps during World War II and was with the Cal-Aero Academy Army Air Cadets Class 43-J. Following training in Texas at Kelly Air Force Base, Cox Field, Paris, Jones Field, Bonham, Brooks Air Force Base, and Bergstrom Air Force Base, Austin, he was stationed stateside in Sedalia Army Air Base, Jackson Army Air Base, and Baer Army Airfield. His first flights of the war began in August 1944 with the 9th Combat Cargo out of Moran Town, India to Myitkyina, Burma. He transferred to Warazup, Burma in January 1945. After serving in the China Burma India Theater of World War II, flying 302 missions and earning 102 points, he was awarded several medals, and was demobilized in July of the same year as a First Lieutenant.

"Oil men tend to divide government people as either "for them" or "against them"..."' (R. Funkhouser, 1953)

—

After the war, he worked as a geologist for Shell Oil domestically and Standard Oil of New Jersey overseas. Passing the career U.S. Foreign Service exams, Funkhouser became a Regional Petroleum Officer for the Middle East, assigned to Iraq, Syria and Lebanon in 1953 and then Bucharest, Damascus, and Moscow. He served as United States Ambassador to Gabon from August 9, 1969, to August 2, 1970, and then served in the Vietnam War, appointed as civilian deputy to Lt. General Michael Davison at Bien Hoa Air Base. He gained the military equivalent rank of Major General and received the National Defense Service Medal. Interviews conducted by Charles Stuart Kennedy, director of the Foreign Affairs Oral History Program, covering Funkhouser's work in Damascus, Moscow, Paris, Gabon, and Vietnam during the period of 1955–1972, are archived at Georgetown University.

After 33 years serving in various Foreign Service specialist positions, Funkhouser retired from the Department of State in 1975 and moved to Scotland as an International Affairs Advisor to the Texas Eastern Corporation. While there, he wrote several papers which today are deposited at the Oil and Gas Institute in the University of Aberdeen. After five years in Scotland, he returned to Washington in 1980 and became the Director of International Affairs in the Environmental Protection Agency and a consultant to the US Department of Education before appointment to his final position as Director of International Activities at the Young Astronaut Council.

== Personal life ==
Funkhouser dropped the middle initial "E." during World War II.

In early 1944, Funkhouser married Phyllis Parkin. They had three children, sons, Phillip Hayes Funkhouser (died 1961) and Bruce Bedford Funkhouser, and a daughter, Blaine Laskowski. He belonged to several clubs and organizations, including Diplomatic and Consular Officers Retired, Metropolitan Club, Chevy Chase Club, the Honourable Company of Edinburgh Golfers, Royal and Ancient Golf Club, Prestwick Golf Club, and Scottish Civic Trust.

In the mid-1990s, Funkhouser and his wife survived a plane crash while on holiday in Europe. It had a lasting impact on the health of his wife, partially crippling her. She also began to suffer from dementia and gradually grew weaker and weaker. On May 15, 2008, Funkhouser shot his wife dead, before turning the gun on himself in the underground garage of their retirement home in Ingleside, Washington, D.C.

Diplomatic posts
Preceded by David M. Bane	United States Ambassador to Gabon; 1969–1970	Succeeded by John A. McKesson, III
