= Joel Danies =

Haitian-American diplomat (born 1958)

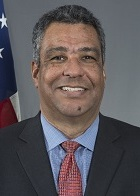
- Danies in 2017

US Ambassador to Gabon and São Tomé and Príncipe
- In office April 18, 2018 – March 1, 2019
- President: Donald Trump
- Preceded by: Cynthia Akuetteh
- Succeeded by: Vernelle FitzPatrick (2024)

Personal details
- Born: April 1, 1958 (age 68) Jacmel, Haiti

Joel Edward Danies (born April 1, 1958, in Jacmel, Haiti) is a career foreign service officer who served concurrently as the US ambassador extraordinary and plenipotentiary to Gabon and São Tomé and Príncipe from 2018 to 2019.

== Education ==
Danies earned a B.S. in Zoology/Animal Biology at Loyola College, Maryland (1977), a B.A. in Political Science and Government at the University of Maryland, College Park, (1979) and an M.S. in National Security Strategy at the National War College in 2010.

== Career ==
Immediately prior to his ambassadorship, Danies was associate dean of the School of Professional and Area Studies, a unit of the Foreign Service Institute. While chargé d'affaires in Belmopan, Belize, during and after Hurricane Mitch in October 1998, Danies declared the area a disaster area in order to allow U.S. aid to arrive. He joined the State Department in 1987 after working for USAir.

== Personal life ==
Danies speaks French, Haitian Creole, and Arabic.
