= Jennifer C. Ward (diplomat) =

American academic administrator and diplomat

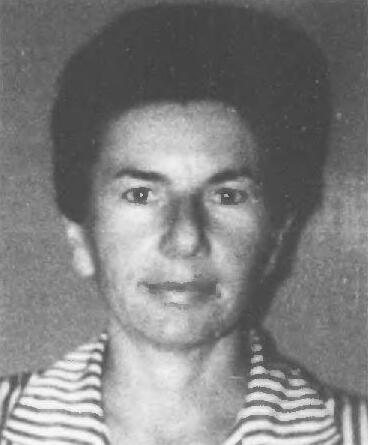
Ward c. 1991

Jennifer Claudette Ward (born January 29, 1944) was United States ambassador to Niger from March 25, 1991, to May 28, 1993.

Ward trained as an historian and received her A.B. degree from Vassar College in 1965 and her M.A. and Ph.D. from the University of California, Los Angeles.

After 20 years in the Foreign Service left to become Associate dean at the Georgetown School of Foreign Service in 1999, returning to her academic roots (Ward taught at Medgar Evers College in Brooklyn and was an administrator at Princeton).

Diplomatic posts
Preceded by Carl Copeland Cundiff	United States Ambassador to Niger; 1991–1993	Succeeded by John S. Davison
