= List of ambassadors of the United States to Niger =

Ambassador of the United States to Niger
- Seal of the United States Department of State

- Flag of a United States ambassador

- Incumbent; Colleen Crenwelge; Chargé d'affaires since September 14, 2026
- Nominator: The president of the United States
- Appointer: The president; with Senate advice and consent
- Inaugural holder: R. Borden Reams as Ambassador Extraordinary and Plenipotentiary
- Formation: October 14, 1960
- Website: U.S. Embassy- Niamey

The day before Niger's independence on August 3, 1960, the first American Chargé d'Affaires ad interim, Donald R. Norland, presented his credentials to take effect the following day. The first United States ambassador to Niger, R. Borden Reams was appointed on October 14, 1960 and presented his credentials on November 23.

== Ambassadors ==
Name	Title	Appointed	Presented credentials	Terminated mission
Donald R. Norland - Career FSO	Chargé d'Affaires ad interim	August 3, 1960 (Note: Norland presented credentials as Chargé d'Affaires ad interim, August 2, 1960, to take effect from August 3, 1960.)	N/A	October 14, 1960
R. Borden Reams (Note: Commissioned during a recess of the Senate; recommissioned after confirmation on February 6, 1961. Also accredited to Dahomey, Ivory Coast, and Upper Volta; resident at Abidjan.) (Note: During Reams' tenure as non-resident Ambassador, the Embassy in Niamey was established February 3, 1961, with Joseph W. Schutz as Chargé d'Affaires ad interim.) - Career FSO	Ambassador Extraordinary and Plenipotentiary	October 14, 1960	November 23, 1960	August 2, 1961
Mercer Cook - Political appointee	Ambassador Extraordinary and Plenipotentiary	June 22, 1961	August 2, 1961	May 30, 1964
Robert J. Ryan - Career FSO	Ambassador Extraordinary and Plenipotentiary	July 9, 1964	August 24, 1964	August 19, 1968
Samuel C. Adams, Jr. - Political appointee	Ambassador Extraordinary and Plenipotentiary	July 24, 1968	September 10, 1968	October 3, 1969
Roswell D. McClelland - Career FSO	Ambassador Extraordinary and Plenipotentiary	July 8, 1970	July 27, 1970	July 7, 1973
L. Douglas Heck - Career FSO	Ambassador Extraordinary and Plenipotentiary	March 22, 1974	May 30, 1974	July 20, 1976
Charles A. James - Political appointee	Ambassador Extraordinary and Plenipotentiary	September 16, 1976	December 11, 1976	July 5, 1979
James Keough Bishop - Career FSO	Ambassador Extraordinary and Plenipotentiary	July 2, 1979	September 1, 1979	May 29, 1981
William Robert Casey, Jr. - Political appointee	Ambassador Extraordinary and Plenipotentiary	March 9, 1982	April 3, 1982	July 29, 1985
Richard Wayne Bogosian - Career FSO	Ambassador Extraordinary and Plenipotentiary	August 1, 1985	October 11, 1985	August 7, 1988
Carl Copeland Cundiff - Career FSO	Ambassador Extraordinary and Plenipotentiary	August 12, 1988	September 9, 1988	July 10, 1991
Jennifer C. Ward - Career FSO	Ambassador Extraordinary and Plenipotentiary	March 25, 1991	August 16, 1991	May 28, 1993
John S. Davison - Career FSO	Ambassador Extraordinary and Plenipotentiary	August 9, 1993	October 23, 1993	July 28, 1996
Charles O. Cecil - Career FSO	Ambassador Extraordinary and Plenipotentiary	June 11, 1996	September 6, 1996	August 13, 1999
Barbro Owens-Kirkpatrick - Career FSO	Ambassador Extraordinary and Plenipotentiary	August 9, 1999	October 11, 1999	July 12, 2002
Gail Dennise Thomas Mathieu - Career FSO	Ambassador Extraordinary and Plenipotentiary	October 3, 2002	December 4, 2002	September 30, 2005
Bernadette M. Allen - Career FSO	Ambassador Extraordinary and Plenipotentiary	February 21, 2006	April 19, 2006	January 15, 2010
Bisa Williams - Career FSO	Ambassador Extraordinary and Plenipotentiary	August 9, 2010	October 29, 2010	September 13, 2013
Eunice S. Reddick - Career FSO	Ambassador Extraordinary and Plenipotentiary	June 30, 2014	July 21, 2014	January 25, 2018
Eric P. Whitaker - Career FSO	Ambassador Extraordinary and Plenipotentiary	November 2, 2017	January 26, 2018	December 1, 2021
Susan N’Garnim - Career FSO	Chargé d'Affaires ad interim	December 1, 2021	N/A	August 19, 2023
Kathleen A. FitzGibbon - Career FSO	Ambassador Extraordinary and Plenipotentiary	August 19, 2023	N/A (Note: FitzGibbon will not formally present her credentials due to the 2023 Nigerien crisis.)	January 16, 2026
J. Ryan Grizzle - Career FSO	Chargé d'Affaires ad interim	July 15, 2026	N/A	September 14, 2026
Colleen Crenwelge - Career FSO	Chargé d'Affaires ad interim	September 14, 2026	N/A	Present

== See also ==
- Niger – United States relations
- Foreign relations of Niger
- Ambassadors of the United States
