= Kathleen A. FitzGibbon =

American diplomat

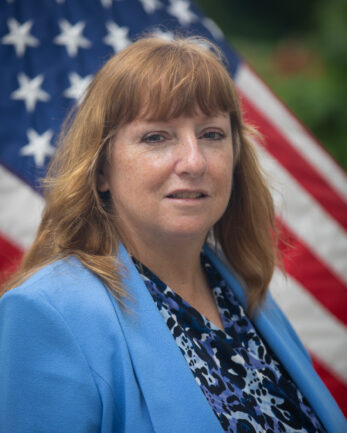

United States Ambassador to Niger
- In office August 19, 2023 – January 16, 2026
- President: Joe Biden; Donald Trump
- Preceded by: Eric P. Whitaker

Personal details
- Education: Hartwick College (BA); University of California-Davis (MA)

Kathleen A. FitzGibbon is an American diplomat who had served as the United States ambassador to Niger.

== Early life and education ==
FitzGibbon earned her bachelor's degree from Hartwick College and a master's degree from the University of California, Davis.

== Career ==
FitzGibbon is a career member of the Senior Foreign Service, with the rank of minister-counselor. Currently, she serves as the deputy chief of mission of the U.S. Embassy in Abuja, Nigeria. Before that, FitzGibbon served as the first division chief of West and Southern Africa, and then the director of the Office of Africa Analysis in the Bureau of Intelligence and Research within the U.S. Department of State. Other assignments in Africa include service as the deputy chief of mission of the U.S. embassies in Sierra Leone and Gabon, as well as the chief of the Political and Economic section of the U.S. Embassy in Uganda. FitzGibbon also served at the U.S. Embassy in Chad and had an earlier posting in Nigeria. FitzGibbon also worked in the Office to Combat and Monitor Trafficking in Persons in the State Department. Before joining the State Department, she was a lecturer at Mary Washington College in Fredericksburg, Virginia.

=== US ambassador to Niger ===
On July 29, 2022, President Joe Biden announced his intent to nominate FitzGibbon as the next ambassador to Niger. On August 3, 2022, her nomination was sent to the United States Senate. Her nomination was sent back to Biden on January 3, 2023, as no action was taken on it for the rest of the year.

President Biden renominated FitzGibbon the same day. Hearings on her nomination were held before Senate Foreign Relations Committee on March 1, 2023. The committee favorably reported the nomination on April 27, 2023. The full Senate confirmed her nomination by voice vote on July 27, 2023. On August 19, she arrived in Niger. The U.S. Department of State announced on the same day that FitzGibbon will not formally present her credentials due to the 2023 Nigerien crisis. She presented her credentials to President of Niger on May 12, 2025.

== Personal life ==
FitzGibbon speaks French.
