= Bernadette M. Allen =

American diplomat (born 1956)

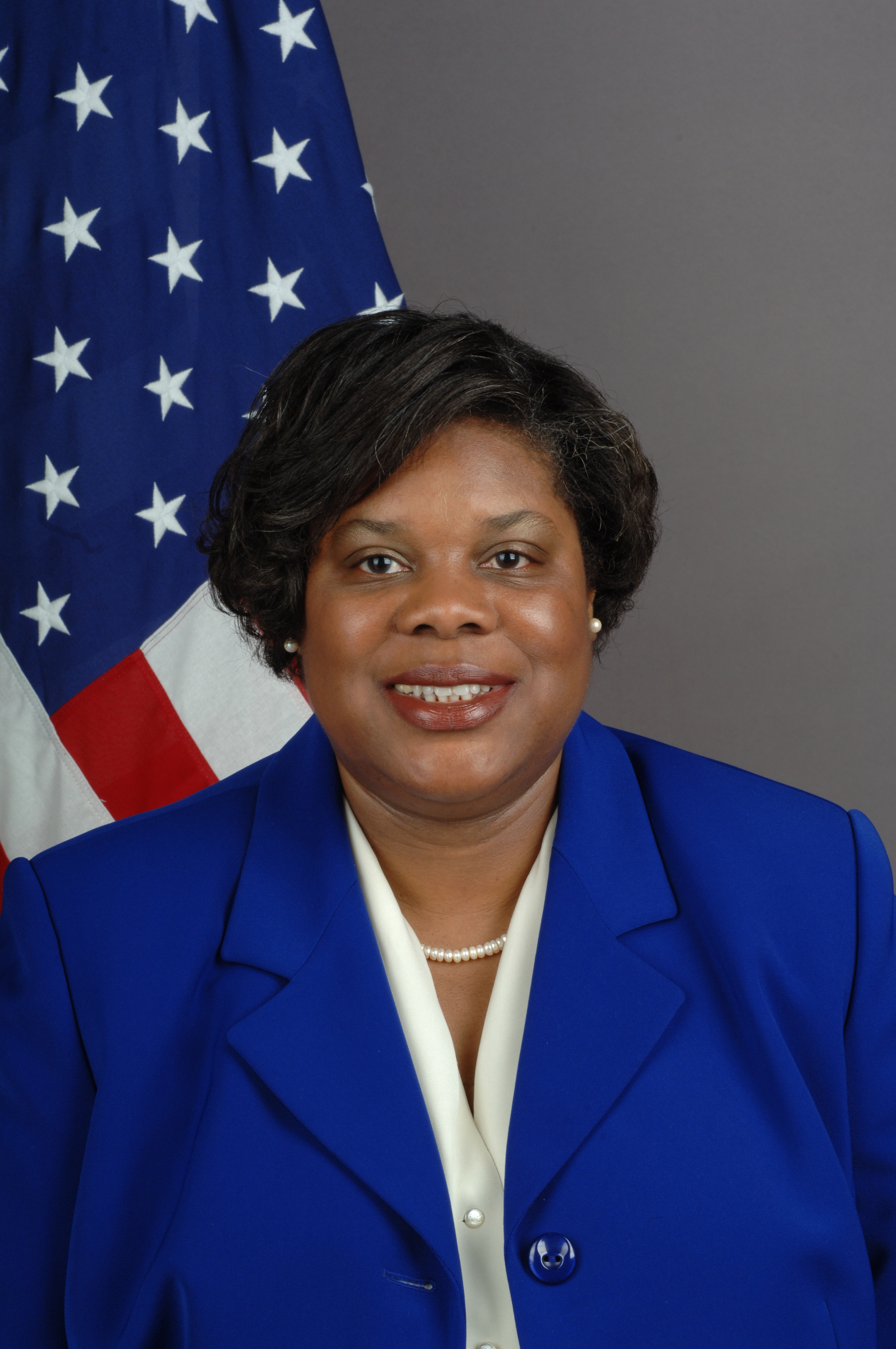
Bernadette M. Allen

Bernadette Mary Allen (born May 15, 1956) is a retired American career diplomat and former United States Ambassador to the Republic of Niger.

== Education ==
Born in Washington, D.C., Allen was raised in Seat Pleasant, MD, and educated in the Prince George's County public school system. Allen earned a Bachelor of Arts degree at Central College in Pella, Iowa in May 1978, with a double major in French language and Linguistics. In her study abroad year (1976-1977) with Central College at the Sorbonne University in Paris, France, she earned a Certificate in French Language and Culture. Allen completed her Master of Arts degree at George Washington University in Washington, D.C. in February 1989, in Human Resources Management.

== Career ==
Allen was commissioned into the U.S. Foreign Service in January 1980. She held assignments in Burundi (1980-1982), The Philippines (1982-1984), The People's Republic of China (1991-1994), Canada (2000-2005) and the Republic of Niger (2006-2010). Her domestic assignments at the U.S. Department of State included the Bureau of Consular Affairs, the Bureau of African Affairs, the Bureau of Legislative Affairs, and the National Foreign Affairs Training Center. President George W. Bush nominated her to serve as U.S. Ambassador to the Republic of Niger, and she was confirmed by the U.S. Senate on February 16, 2006. Allen continued her service as U.S. Ambassador to the Republic of Niger during the administration of President Barack H. Obama. Subsequently, Allen served for ten years on the Foreign Service Grievance Board (2013-2023).

== Sources ==
- United States Department of State: Biography of Bernadette M. Allen
- "Bernadette Allen" (Fee, via Fairfax County Public Library). The Complete Marquis Who's Who. Marquis Who's Who. 2010. . Gale Biography In Context. Gale Document Number: GALE|K2021365388

Diplomatic posts
Preceded by Gail D. T. Mathieu	U.S. Ambassador to Niger; 2006–2010	Succeeded by Bisa Williams
