= Bisa Williams =

American diplomat

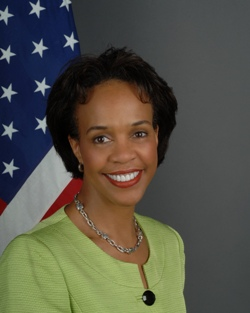

United States Ambassador to Niger
- In office October 29, 2010 – September 13, 2013
- President: Barack Obama
- Preceded by: Bernadette M. Allen
- Succeeded by: Eunice S. Reddick

Personal details
- Born: 1954 (age 71–72)
- Children: 1 son
- Relatives: Ntozake Shange (sister); Ifa Bayeza (sister)
- Education: National War College, University of California, Los Angeles, Yale College
- Occupation: Ambassador

Bisa Williams (born 1954) is an American diplomat. She is the former Ambassador from the United States of America to the Republic of Niger in Niamey. She assumed the post on October 29, 2010. She left her post in September 13, 2013.

== Early life ==
Bisa Williams was born in Trenton, New Jersey and raised in St. Louis, Missouri and Lawrenceville, New Jersey. Her father Dr. Paul T. Williams was a general surgeon while her mother Eloise Owens Williams was a social worker and later a professor of Social Work at the College of New Jersey. Her sister, Ntozake Shange, was a playwright best known for writing the Broadway play For Colored Girls Who Have Considered Suicide / When the Rainbow Is Enuf. Her other sister, Ifa Bayeza, is also a playwright, who co-wrote the multi-generational novel, Some Sing, Some Cry, with her sister Shange. She received as Bachelor of Arts degree from Yale College, where she graduated in 1976 cum laude with honors distinctions in Black Literature of the Americas. She later received a Master of Arts degree in National Security Strategy from the National War College, and a second MA from the University of California, Los Angeles in comparative literature.

== Career ==
Bisa Williams is a career foreign service officer, having joined the Foreign Service in 1984. Her previous overseas postings include Port Louis, Mauritius; Paris, France and Panama City, Panama. Her first overseas assignment was in Port Louis, Mauritius, a mission that also covers Seychelles and Comoros, where she served as Deputy Chief of Mission under Ambassador John Price.

Prior to being assigned to Niamey, Bisa Williams, then U.S. Deputy Assistant Secretary of State for Western Hemisphere Affairs, participated in a September 2009 six-day trip to Cuba in an attempt to improve bilateral relations. During the trip she met with Cuban Deputy Foreign Minister Dagoberto Rodríguez Barrera, worked on restoring direct mail service between the two countries, and toured parts of western Cuba hit by Hurricane Ike. She also invited dissidents to a reception at the United States Interests Section in Havana.

Her nomination to be United States Ambassador to Niger was sent to the United States Senate on November 30, 2009, and she assumed the post in Niamey eleven months later, on October 29, 2010. She left her post in 2013.

Williams is currently Deputy Assistant Secretary in the Bureau of African Affairs at the U.S. Department of State.

Diplomatic posts
| Preceded by Bernadette M. Allen | United States Ambassador to Niger; 2010–2014 | Succeeded by Eunice S. Reddick |
