= Cynthia Akuetteh =

American diplomat (born 1948)

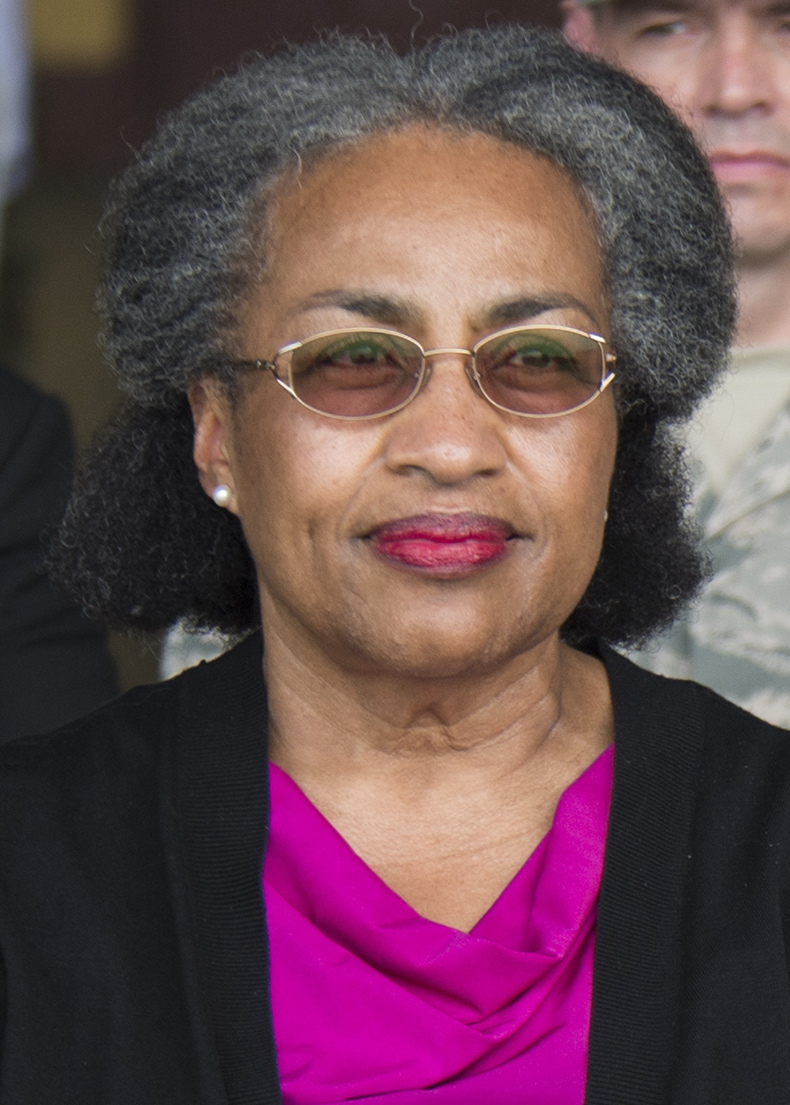
- Cynthia Akuetteh in 2016

United States Ambassador to Gabon
- In office December 26, 2014 – February 26, 2018
- President: Barack Obama; Donald Trump
- Preceded by: Eric Benjaminson
- Succeeded by: Joel Danies

United States Ambassador to São Tomé and Príncipe
- In office April 10, 2015 – February 26, 2018
- President: Barack Obama; Donald Trump
- Preceded by: Eric Benjaminson
- Succeeded by: Joel Danies

Personal details
- Born: 1948 (age 77–78)
- Education: Long Island University; National Defense University

Cynthia Akuetteh (born Cynthia Helen Archie in 1948) is a diplomat and was the United States Ambassador to São Tomé and Príncipe and United States Ambassador to Gabon.

== Early life and education ==
Akuetteh was born Cynthia Helen Archie in Washington, D.C. to Richard Louis Archie II and Sallie Dolores Hines. She earned a B.A. degree in history with honors from C.W. Post College of Long Island University in 1970, and was awarded a master's degree in National Security Resource Policy from the National Defense University in 1973. Akuetteh completed two years of graduate study at Columbia University.

== Career ==
Akuetteh began her career with the Peace Corps. Her initial assignment was as a Program Officer in Washington, D.C. She then moved to Ghana as Deputy Director of the program there. After Akuetteh entered the U.S. Foreign Service in 1984, she held a series of international assignments in Niger, Tanzania, Canada and Venezuela. Much of her subsequent work was focused on Africa. She served as the Deputy Director of the Africa Bureau's Economic Policy Staff, and later as Director of the Office of Central African Affairs, overseeing bilateral relations with ten African nations. She also served as Deputy Assistant Secretary for African Affairs from 2012 to 2013. In 2012 she headed the U.S. delegation to a meeting of the US – Nigeria Bi-national Commission on the Niger Delta and National Development Working Group held in Port Harcourt.

She appeared before the Senate Foreign Relations Committee December 17, 2013 to discuss her vision for her role as ambassador. Following Senate confirmation, she was sworn in as U.S. Ambassador to the Republic of Gabon and São Tomé and Príncipe on August 1, 2014. She presented her credentials in those nations on December 26, 2014, and April 10, 2015, respectively. At a time of political unrest in Gabon, she publicly expressed concern over any "extra-constitutional" moves for regime change and promoted "democratic" solutions.

In May 2015, Akuetteh welcomed U.S. military members joining together with military from 15 African countries as well as the U.N. at the opening ceremony of the Central Accord 2015 exercise at Libreville, Gabon. Akuetteh noted that the prime purpose of the undertaking was to maintain peace and strengthen the relationships of the countries participating. She retired on February 26, 2018.

== Personal ==
Akuetteh was previously married to Nii Akuetteh, founder of the Democracy and Conflict Research Institute in Ghana. They have two adult children.

Diplomatic posts
Preceded by Eric D. Benjaminson	United States Ambassador to Gabon; 2014–2018	Succeeded by Joel Danies
Preceded by Eric D. Benjaminson	United States Ambassador to Sao Tome and Principe; 2015–2018	Succeeded by Joel Danies
