= Harriet Winsar Isom =

American diplomat

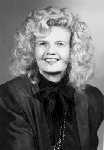

Personal details
- Born: May 11, 1936 (age 90) Heppner, Oregon
- Education: Mills College (B.A., 1958); the Fletcher School of Law and Diplomacy (M.A.L.D., 1960).

Harriet Winsar Isom (born November 4, 1936) is an American retired diplomat and career Foreign Service Officer. She served as the Chargé d'Affaires ad interim to Laos (August 1986 – August 1989) and Ambassador to Benin (January 26, 1990 – November 14, 1992) and Cameroon (August 17, 1992 – January 15, 1996),

Isom was born in Heppner, Oregon on November 4, 1936. She graduated from Mills College (B.A., 1958) and the Fletcher School of Law and Diplomacy (M.A.L.D., 1960).

During Isom's tenure in Laos, an agreement was reached regarding US aide to Laos and Laos looking for Americans who had been missing since the Vietnam War.
