= Eunice Reddick =

American diplomat (born 1951)

Eunice Sharon Reddick
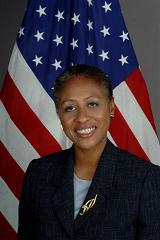

United States Chargé d’Affaires to Burundi
- In office May 5, 2019 – March 2, 2021
- President: Donald Trump
- Preceded by: Anne Casper
- Succeeded by: Melanie Harris Higgins

United States Ambassador to Niger
- In office September 12, 2014 – January 25, 2018
- President: Barack Obama; Donald Trump
- Preceded by: Bisa Williams
- Succeeded by: Eric P. Whitaker

United States Ambassador to São Tomé and Príncipe
- In office April 15, 2008 – July 18, 2010
- President: George W. Bush; Barack Obama
- Preceded by: Barrie Walkley
- Succeeded by: Eric Benjaminson

United States Ambassador to Gabon
- In office December 6, 2007 – July 18, 2010
- President: George W. Bush; Barack Obama
- Preceded by: Barrie Walkley
- Succeeded by: Eric Benjaminson

Personal details
- Born: 1951 (age 74–75) New York City, New York, U.S.
- Spouse: Marc M. Wall
- Children: Gregory; Sarah
- Education: New York University (BA); Columbia University (MIA)

Eunice Sharon Reddick (born 1951) is an American diplomat and is a former ambassador to Niger, Gabon, and São Tomé and Príncipe.

== Biography ==
Reddick graduated from Hunter College High School in New York City in 1969 and received a BA in history and literature from New York University (1973) and a master's degree in international affairs from Columbia University’s School of International Affairs (1975). After completing her graduate studies, Reddick worked for several years at the Africa-America Institute in New York and Washington.

Reddick began her Foreign Service career in 1980 and was assigned in 1981 as consular officer to the Harare Embassy, Zimbabwe. In 1983 she returned to the United States State Department and was assigned to the Bureau of Population, Refugee and Migration Affairs to monitor USG assistance to African refugees. From 1986 to 1988, Reddick served as Country officer for Tanzania and the India Ocean countries in the Bureau of African Affairs. After that assignment, she was a Senior Watch Officer in the Secretary's 24-hour Operations Center. From 1989 to 1990, she studied Mandarin Chinese at the AIT/Taipei Language School, followed by an assignment to the political section at the Beijing Embassy.

In 1993 she was the recipient of the Dean and Virginia Rusk Fellowship award. Reddick spent a year as an Associate at Georgetown University’s Institute for the Study of Diplomacy. She then followed two Deputy Director assignments in the State Department – the first in the Office of Burma, Cambodia, Laos, Thailand and Vietnam Affairs, Bureau of East Asian and Pacific Affairs, and the second in the Office of International Development Assistance of the Bureau of International Organization Affairs. From 1997 to 2000, she was the chief of the political section at the Taipei Main Office of American Institute in Taiwan (AIT). From 2002 to 2004, she was director of the Office of Philippines, Malaysia, Brunei and Singapore Affairs after a stint as Deputy Director of that office when it also covered Indonesia. She served from 2005 to 2007 as director of the Office of East African Affairs in the State Department Bureau of African Affairs. Following those posts, she was appointed by President George W. Bush and sworn in as United States Ambassador to Gabon and São Tomé and Príncipe. She was succeeded by Eric D. Benjaminson in December 2010.

She was nominated on January 6, 2014 to be the next United States Ambassador to Niger. She was confirmed on June 30, 2014 and presented her credentials on July 21, 2014.

== Personal life ==
Reddick is married to the former ambassador to Chad, Marc M. Wall. They have two children, Gregory, 22, and Sarah, 17. Reddick was born in New York City, and spent her childhood there.

Diplomatic posts
| Preceded by Barrie Walkley | United States Ambassador to Gabon; 2007–2010 | Succeeded by Eric Benjaminson |
| Preceded by Barrie Walkley | United States Ambassador to São Tomé and Príncipe; 2008–2010 | Succeeded by Eric Benjaminson |
| Preceded by Bisa Williams | United States Ambassador to Niger; 2014–2018 | Succeeded by Eric P. Whitaker |
