= Joseph Monroe Segars =

American diplomat

Joseph Monroe Segars (November 6, 1938 Hartsville, South Carolina – July 20, 2014 Lakewood Ranch, Florida) was an American Career Foreign Service Officer who served as Ambassador Extraordinary and Plenipotentiary to Cape Verde from 1992 until 1996. He also served overseas in Austria, South Africa, Jamaica, Nigeria, Tanzania, and Cape Verde.

When Segars’ parents moved to Philadelphia in search of better jobs, he was raised by his maternal aunt and uncle Walter and Francis Hines. After graduating from Butler High School in 1956, he joined his family in Philadelphia to work before starting College. Segars graduated in 1961 from Cheyney University of Pennsylvania with a Bachelor’s of Science degree in Education. After graduating, he taught sixth grade in Gary, Indiana’s public school system until 1967. At that time, he returned to Philadelphia and began teaching sixth grade in their public school system. Segars joined the U.S. Foreign Service in 1970 and became the first African American to be assigned to the U.S. Embassy in Vienna, Austria. Segars remained in this position until 1973.

He served as Consul General several times. In 1976, he began in that capacity in Johannesburg, South Africa. One of the first African Americans to be assigned to South Africa, his arrival in Johannesburg coincided with the Soweto Uprising which was a student protest against the Afrikaans Medium Decree of 1974. He was Consul General in Kingston, Jamaica from 1978 to 1980 and in 1983, Segars was appointed Consul General, this time in Lagos, Nigeria where he served until 1986.
