= Vernelle FitzPatrick =

American diplomat

Vernelle Trim FitzPatrick
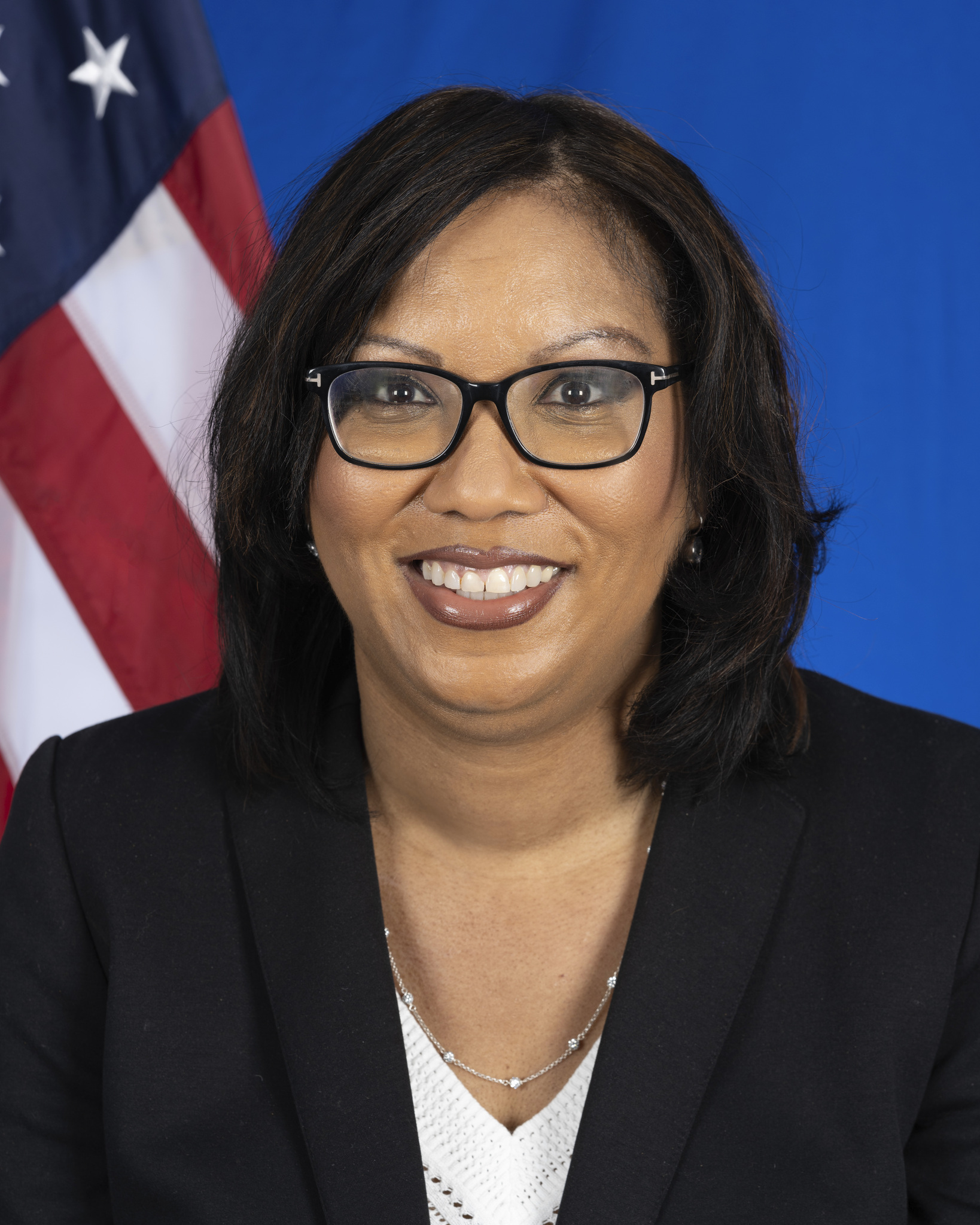

United States Ambassador to Gabon
- In office January 26, 2024 – January 16, 2026
- President: Joe Biden; Donald Trump
- Preceded by: Joel Danies (2019)
- Succeeded by: Keith Heffern

Personal details
- Education: Davidson College (BA); George Washington University (Master's degree)

Vernelle Trim FitzPatrick is an American diplomat who had served as the United States ambassador to Gabon.

== Early life and education ==
FitzPatrick earned her bachelor's degree from Davidson College and her master's degree from George Washington University in Washington, D.C.

== Career ==
FitzPatrick is a career member of the Senior Foreign Service, with the rank of Counselor. Currently, she serves as Office Director for the Office of Assistance to Africa in the Bureau of Population, Refugees, and Migration at the United States Department of State in Washington, D.C. Previously, FitzPatrick served as the Deputy Chief of Mission of the U.S. Embassy in Yaoundé, Cameroon and before this assignment, she served as Acting Deputy Director for the Office of Central African Affairs in the Bureau of African Affairs at the State Department. She also has served as deputy director for the Office of West African Affairs in the Bureau of African Affairs. FitzPatrick has also served as an Ethiopia Desk Officer in the Office of East African Affairs and held positions as the Political Section Chief at the U.S. Embassy in Accra, Ghana, as well as a Political Officer at the U.S. Embassy in Sarajevo, Bosnia and Herzegovina.

=== U.S. ambassadorship nomination ===
On February 27, 2023, President Joe Biden nominated FitzPatrick to be the next ambassador to Gabon. Hearings on her nomination were held before the Senate Foreign Relations Committee on June 21, 2023. On July 13, 2023, her nomination was favorably reported out of committee. On November 29, 2023, her nomination was confirmed by United States Senate by voice vote. She was sworn into office on January 12, 2024. She arrived in Gabon on January 16, 2024. She presented her credentials to Transitional President of Gabon Brice Oligui on January 26, 2024.

== Personal life ==
Her languages include French and Spanish.

== Works and Events ==
FitzPatrick participated in a discussion roundtable that centered around women refugees in Africa and how to promote peace.
