= Howard G. Funkhouser =

American mathematician and historian (1898–1984)

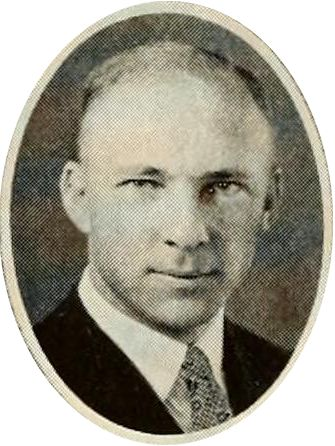
- Born: April 14, 1898
- Died: December 1984 (aged 86)

Academic background
- Education: Washington and Lee University; Columbia University
- Thesis: Historical Development of the Graphical Representation of Statistical Data

Academic work
- Discipline: mathematics history
- Institutions: Washington and Lee University; Phillips Exeter Academy
- Main interests: history of graphical methods

Howard Gray Funkhouser (April 14, 1898 – December 1984) was an American mathematician, historian, and associate professor of mathematics at the Washington and Lee University, and later at the Phillips Exeter Academy, particularly known for his early work on the history of graphical methods.

== Biography ==
Funkhouser was born in Dayton, Virginia to Charles Andrew Funkhouser and Maud Irene Snapp. He obtained his AB in mathematics in 1921 from the Washington and Lee University, and his A.M. in mathematics from Columbia University in 1924. In 1937 he also obtained his PhD from Columbia with the thesis Historical Development of the Graphical Representation of Statistical Data.

Funkhouser started his academic career as instructor at the Virginia Military Institute, instructor at Columbia University, and was Associate Professor of Mathematics at the Washington and Lee University. In June 1932 he was appointed instructor in mathematics at the Phillips Exeter Academy. In the 1930s he wrote a series of articles and his thesis on the history of quantitative graphics. This thesis van republished under the same title the same year in the scholarly journal on the history of science Osiris. In 1932 he was elected member of the American Mathematical Society.

Funkhouser was married to Louise Thompson and lived with his family in Exeter, New Hampshire, where he died in December 1984.

== Work ==
=== Playfair and his charts, 1935 ===
In the 1935 article "Playfair and his charts" Funkhouser and Walker explained, that the work of William Playfair was practically forgotten in the second part of the 19th century. Funkhouser quoted the English economist and logician W. Stanley Jevons, who had stated in 1879:

Englishmen lost sight of the fact that William Playfair, who had never been heard of in this generation, produced statistical atlases and statistical curves that ought to be treated by some writer in the same way that Dr. Guy had treated the method of Dr. Todd.

Funkhouser and Walker argued, that Playfair should be recognized as the “man who invented outright the graphic method of representing statistical data.” His Commercial and Political Atlas, published in of 1786 was historically the first book that offered a series of statistical charts. These charts pictured the import and exports of two dozen countries during the whole of the eighteenth century, and some other economical data, such as the progress of the commerce, revenues, expenditure, and debts of England over the same period.

=== A note on a tenth century graph, 1936 ===
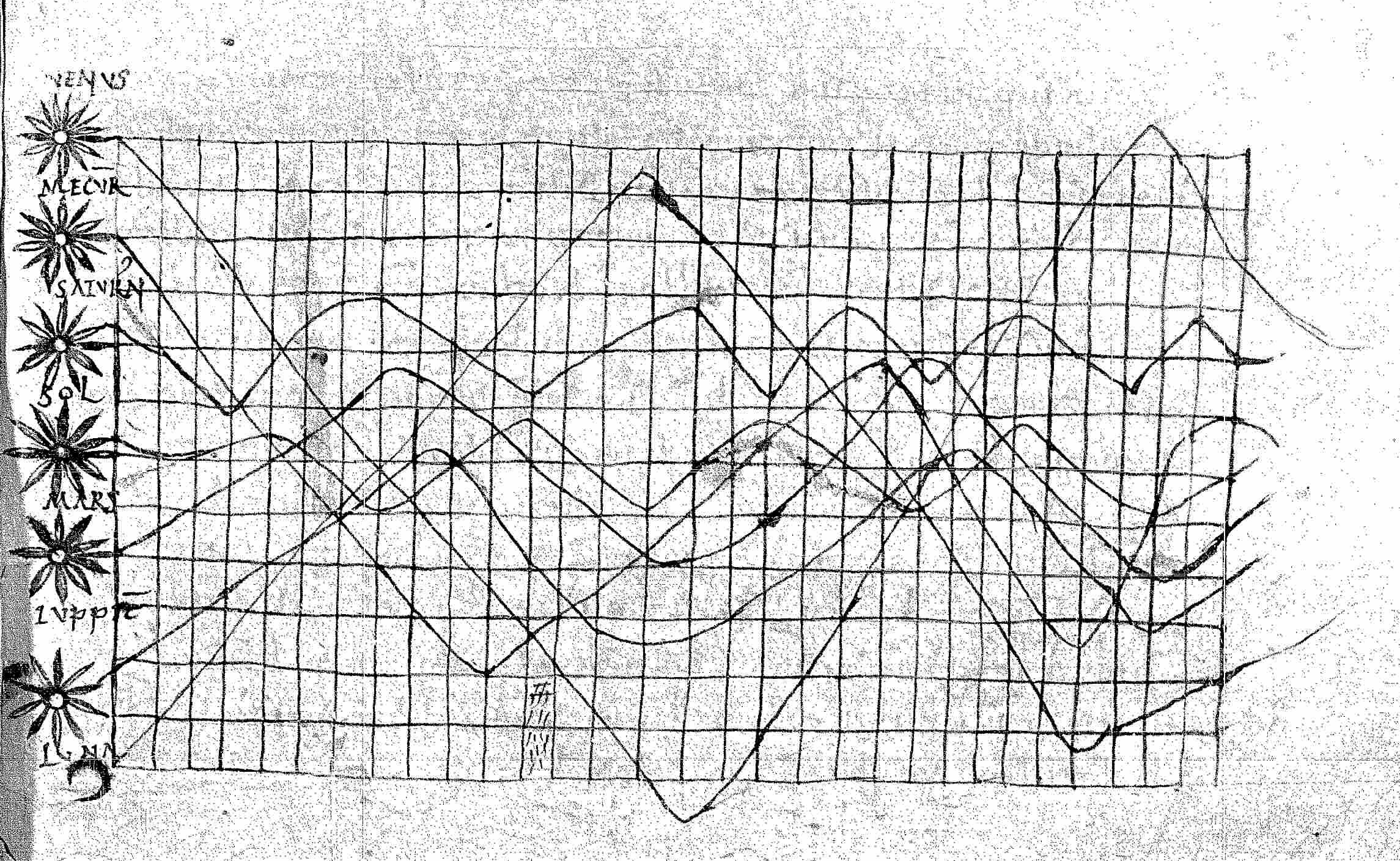
Graph of planetary movements, from an appendix of a late 10th century copy of Macrobius' Commentary on Cicero's Somnium Scipionis.

In the 1936 article "A Note on a Tenth Century Graph," Funkhouser explained that one particular 10th-century graph could be considered to be the earliest graphical display. In his words:

The graph given here in facsimile is of significance in the history of graphic methods in that it appears to be the oldest extant example of an attempt to represent changeable values graphically which in appearance closely resembles modem practice. The distinguishing feature is the use of a grid as a background for the drawing of the curves. The graph dates from the tenth, possibly eleventh century, and forms a part of a manuscript discovered by Sigmund Günther in 1877.

Furthermore, he explained that the "graph apparently was meant to represent a plot of the inclinations of the planetary orbits as a function of the time. For this purpose the zone of the zodiac was represented on a plane with a horizontal line divided into thirty parts as the time or longitudinal axis."

Edward Tufte (1983) recalled, that Funkhouser made a critical note about this early time-series chart, that "the astronomical content is confused and there are difficulties in reconciling the graph and its accompanying text with the actual movements of the planets. Particularly disconcerting is the wavy path ascribed to the sun."

=== Historical development of the graphical representation of statistical data, 1937 ===
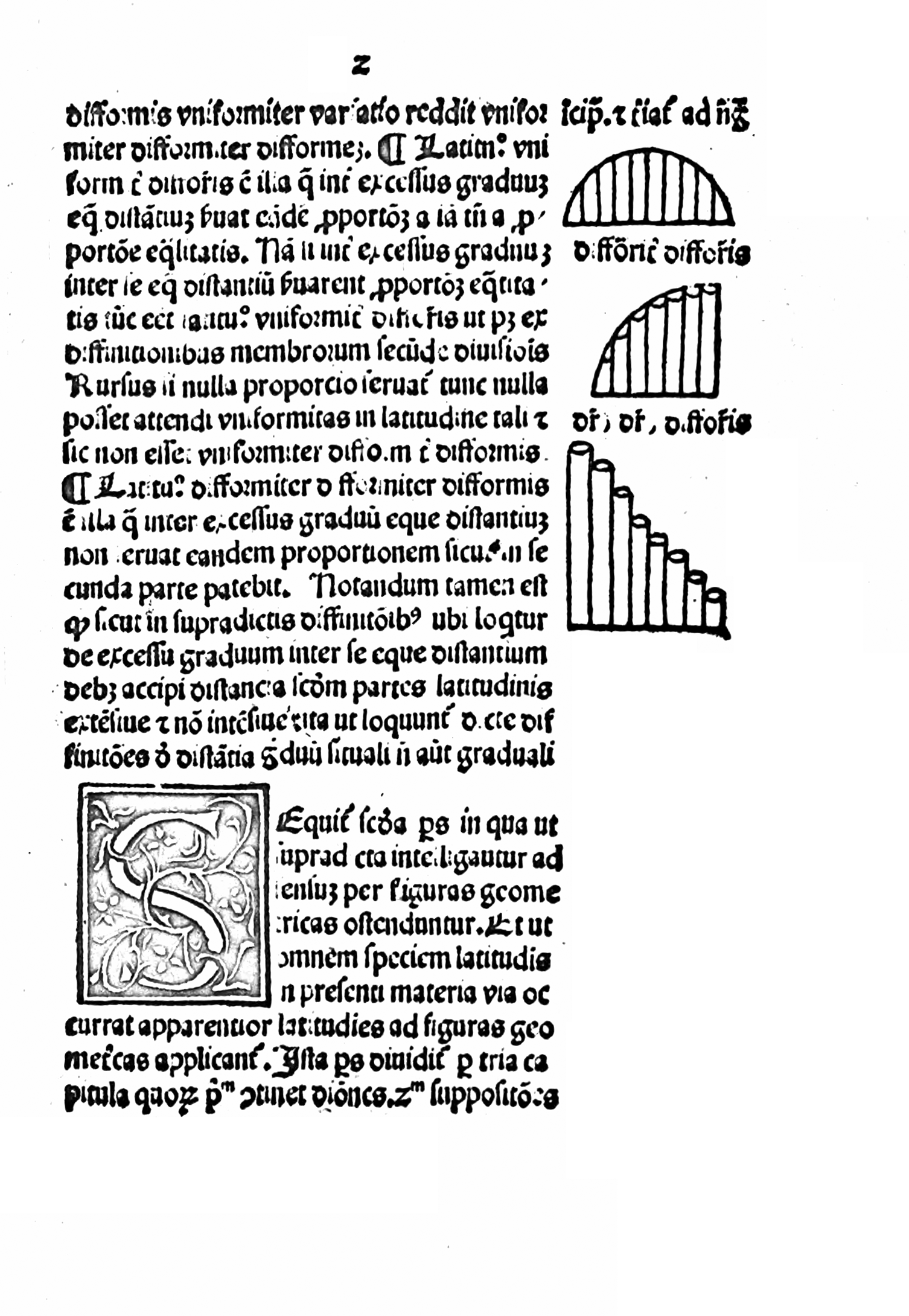
Around 1350 Nicole Oresme developed a prototype of bar chart.

Funkhouser's 1937 thesis, Historical Development of the Graphical Representation of Statistical Data, is considered the first modern overview of the origins and development of statistical graphics. One of the motives to start this work was the growing use of graphic methods in his days, as Funkhouser explained:

There has developed a widespread use of graphs so extensive... that one might say that the graphic method is rapidly becoming a universal language. There are many indications of such a tendency. Statistical graphs appear in all types of periodicals, they are extensively used in advertising, their construction and use are taught in the classroom, experiments have been conducted and others children can understand and read certain types."

In his paper Funkhouser highlighted several milestones in the historical development of the graphical representation of statistical data:

- In the historical development as a whole, different stages can be encountered:
  1. Initiation of the coordinate principle in ancient times
  2. Drawing of curves on the coordinate background in the Middle Ages
  3. Application of analytic geometry invented by René Descartes in 1637
  4. Collection of statistical data from observation, and
  5. Translation of statistical data into graphical expression, which started with William Playfair in 1768
- The first use of coordinates was in Ancient Egypt. And around 140 BC it was established that astronomers and surveyors used coordinate field to locate places on the earth surface by means of longitudes and latitudes.
- Around 1350 Nicole Oresme developed a prototype of bar chart. Funkhouser commented, that "if a pioneering contemporary had collected some data and presented Oresme with some facts to work on, we might have had statistical graphs four hundred years before Playfair."

On the theme of standards and standardisation in graphic presentation, Funkhouser argued that this was nothing new. He explained, that "the problem is met in trying to classify and standardize graphic forms have been wrestled with for almost a hundred years."

== Selected publications ==
Books:

- Funkhouser, Howard Gray, and Helen Mary Walker. Playfair and his charts. MacMillan and Company, 1935.
- H. Gray Funkhouser. Historical development of the graphical representation of statistical data, Thesis (Ph.D.) Columbia University, published by Saint Catherine Press, Bruges, Belgium, 1937.
- Weeks, Arthur William, and Howard Gray Funkhouser. Plane Trigonometry. D. Van Nostrand Company, 1943; 2nd ed. 1953.
- Arthur W. Weeks and H. Gray Funkhouser. Plane trigonometry, with five-place tables. Princeton, N.J., Van Nostrand, 1953.

Articles, a selection:

- Funkhouser, H. Gray. "A short account of the history of symmetric functions of roots of equations." American Mathematical Monthly (1930): 357–365.
- Funkhouser, H. Gray. "A note on a tenth century graph." Osiris (1936): 260–262.
- Funkhouser, H. Gray. "Historical development of the graphical representation of statistical data." Osiris (1937): 269–404.
