= John A. McKesson, III =

American diplomat

John Alexander McKesson III (1922 – May 21, 2002) was an American Career Foreign Service Officer who served as the American Ambassador Extraordinary and Plenipotentiary to Gabon (1970-1975). McKesson was also the Associate Editor of Arts d'Afrique Noire and an adjunct Professor of politics at the Institute of French Studies at New York University.

== Biography ==
McKesson entered Columbia University as a junior and went on to receive an AB and MA. After serving four years in the navy during World War II and working for a short time at Goodyear Tire and Rubber Company in Akron, Ohio, he joined the Foreign Service in 1947.
