= List of ambassadors of the United States to Gabon =

Ambassador of the United States to Gabon
- Seal of the United States Department of State

- Flag of a United States ambassador

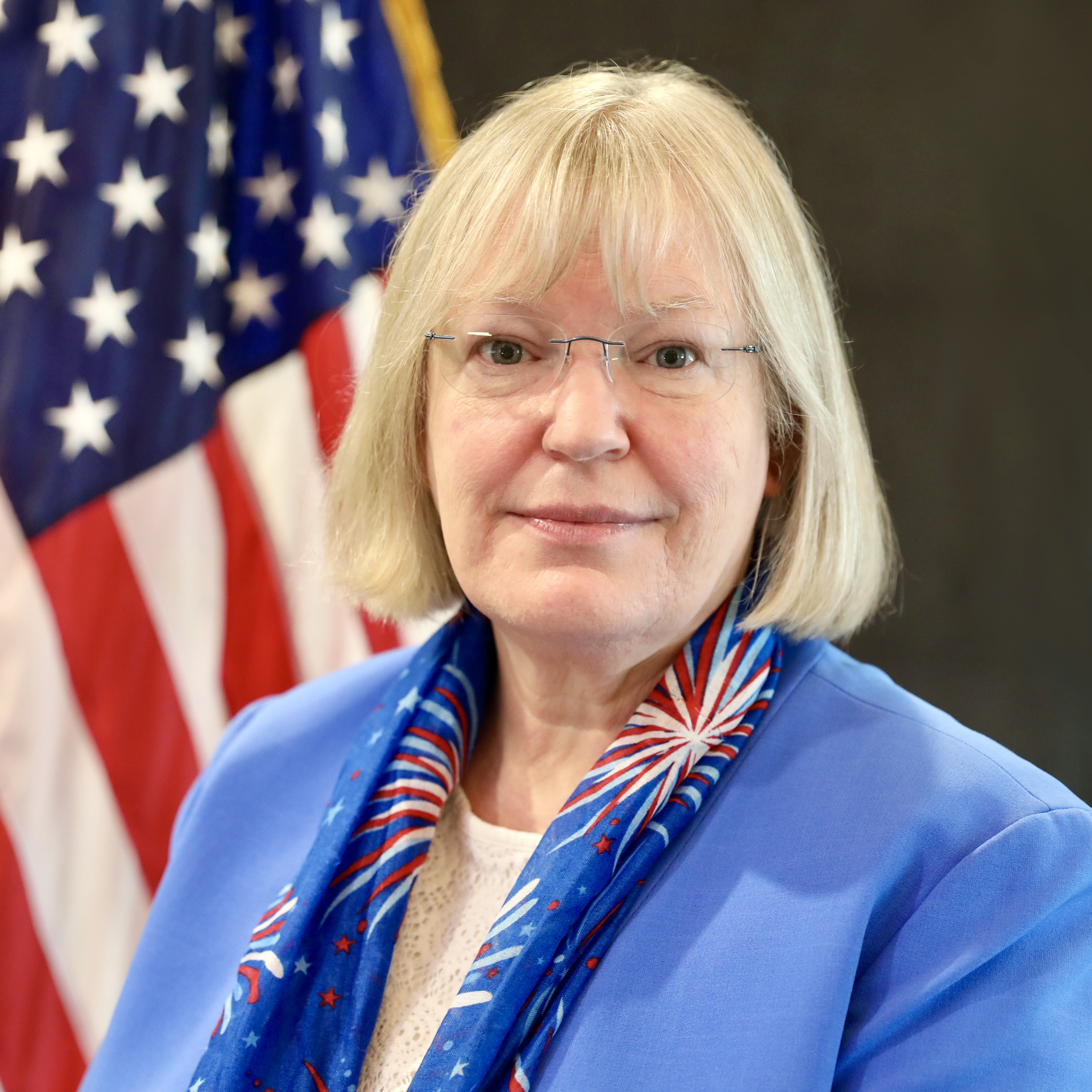
- Incumbent; Susan N'Garnim; Chargé d 'affaires since January 17, 2026
- Nominator: The president of the United States
- Appointer: The president with Senate advice and consent
- Inaugural holder: W. Wendell Blancke as Ambassador Extraordinary and Plenipotentiary
- Formation: December 12, 1960
- Website: U.S. Embassy - Libreville

This is a list of ambassadors of the United States to Gabon.

Gabon had been an overseas territory of France since 1910. At that time it became part of French Equatorial Africa, which included Middle Congo (now Republic of the Congo), Chad, and Oubangui-Chari (now Central African Republic). Gabon achieved its independence as the Gabonese Republic on August 17, 1960.

The United States immediately recognized the new Gabonese Republic and moved to establish diplomatic relations. The new U.S. embassy in Brazzaville, Republic of the Congo, had been established two days earlier on August 15. The current resident in Brazzaville, Alan W. Lukens, was commissioned as a Chargé d'Affaires ad interim to Gabon and presented his credentials to the government on August 17, 1960. W. Wendell Blancke was appointed as the first ambassador on December 12, 1960. He served concurrently as the ambassador to Gabon, Central African Republic, Chad, and the Republic of the Congo while resident in Brazzaville.

During Blanke’s tenure as non-resident ambassador, the embassy in Libreville was established March 20, 1961, with Walker A. Diamanti as Chargé d’Affaires ad interim. In September 1961 the first ambassador was appointed solely for Gabon. In 1975 the ambassador to Gabon was also accredited to the newly independent nation of São Tomé and Príncipe.

The U.S. Embassy in Gabon is located in Libreville.

== Ambassadors ==
Name	Title	Appointed	Presented credentials	Terminated mission	Notes
W. Wendell Blancke – Career FSO	Ambassador Extraordinary and Plenipotentiary	December 12, 1960	January 13, 1961	Superseded, October 10, 1961	
Charles F. Darlington – Political appointee	Ambassador Extraordinary and Plenipotentiary	September 20, 1961	October 18, 1961	July 26, 1964	
David M. Bane – Career FSO	Ambassador Extraordinary and Plenipotentiary	July 22, 1965	August 14, 1965	June 29, 1969	
Richard Funkhouser – Career FSO	Ambassador Extraordinary and Plenipotentiary	June 13, 1969	August 9, 1969	August 2, 1970	
John A. McKesson, III – Career FSO	Ambassador Extraordinary and Plenipotentiary	December 10, 1970	February 4, 1971	June 1, 1975	
Andrew L. Steigman – Career FSO	Ambassador Extraordinary and Plenipotentiary	June 10, 1975	August 9, 1975	August 21, 1977	São Tomé and Príncipe achieved independence on July 12, 1975. The U.S. ambassador to Gabon and subsequent ambassadors were concurrently commissioned to São Tomé and Príncipe while resident in Libreville.
Arthur T. Tienken – Career FSO	Ambassador Extraordinary and Plenipotentiary	February 3, 1978	March 6, 1978	July 19, 1981	
Francis Terry McNamara – Career FSO	Ambassador Extraordinary and Plenipotentiary	December 11, 1981	January 19, 1982	August 3, 1984	
Larry C. Williamson – Career FSO	Ambassador Extraordinary and Plenipotentiary	August 13, 1984	November 20, 1984	August 21, 1987	
Warren Clark Jr. – Career FSO	Ambassador Extraordinary and Plenipotentiary	August 10, 1987	September 19, 1987	August 24, 1989	
Keith Leveret Wauchope – Career FSO	Ambassador Extraordinary and Plenipotentiary	November 6, 1989	December 8, 1989	July 13, 1992	
Joseph Charles Wilson IV – Career FSO	Ambassador Extraordinary and Plenipotentiary	July 14, 1992	September 17, 1992	August 5, 1995	
Elizabeth Raspolic – Career FSO	Ambassador Extraordinary and Plenipotentiary	October 3, 1995	November 29, 1995	July 24, 1998	
James V. Ledesma – Career FSO	Ambassador Extraordinary and Plenipotentiary	October 22, 1998	December 16, 1998	June 18, 2001	
Thomas F. Daughton	Chargé d’Affaires a.i.	June 18, 2001	Unknown	June 20, 2002	
Kenneth Price Moorfield – Career FSO	Ambassador Extraordinary and Plenipotentiary	January 30, 2002	June 20, 2002	July 18, 2004	
R. Barrie Walkley – Career FSO	Ambassador Extraordinary and Plenipotentiary	July 2, 2004	November 12, 2004	April 27, 2007	
Eunice S. Reddick – Career FSO	Ambassador Extraordinary and Plenipotentiary	November 9, 2007	December 6, 2007	July 18, 2010	
Eric D. Benjaminson – Career FSO	Ambassador Extraordinary and Plenipotentiary	September 15, 2010	December 3, 2010	May 21, 2013	
Cynthia Akuetteh – Career FSO	Ambassador Extraordinary and Plenipotentiary	August 1, 2014	December 26, 2014	February 26, 2018	
Joel Danies – Career FSO	Ambassador Extraordinary and Plenipotentiary	February 21, 2018	April 18, 2018	March 1, 2019	
Robert E. Whitehead – Career FSO	Chargé d’Affaires a.i.	March 1, 2019		August 17, 2020	
Christopher Tremann	Chargé d’Affaires a.i.	August 17, 2020		September 28, 2020	
Samuel R. Watson	Chargé d’Affaires a.i.	September 28, 2020		October 27, 2022	
Christopher Tremann	Chargé d’Affaires a.i.	September 7, 2021		October 15, 2021	
Ellen B. Thorburn	Chargé d’Affaires a.i.	October 27, 2022		November 29, 2023	
David G. Mosby	Chargé d’Affaires a.i.	November 29, 2023		January 16, 2024	
Vernelle FitzPatrick – Career FSO	Ambassador Extraordinary and Plenipotentiary	November 29, 2023	January 26, 2024	January 16, 2026	
Susan N'Garnim – Career FSO	Chargé d’Affaires a.i.	January 17, 2026		Incumbent	

== See also ==
- Gabon – United States relations
- Foreign relations of Gabon
- Ambassadors of the United States
