= 1964 United States Embassy in Libreville bombings =

Terrorist incident in Gabon

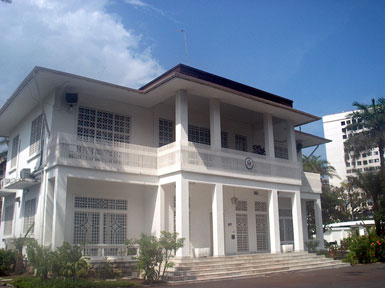
The United States Embassy in Libreville

The United States Embassy in Libreville, Gabon was bombed on 5 March 1964 and again on 8 March.

== Background ==
Two weeks before the bombings, Gabon had undergone an abortive coup d'état against its president, Leon M'ba. Following the attempted coup, some Gabonese mistakenly identified the United States as a co-conspirator in the attempted coup. Time asserted that French officials helped spread the rumor of American involvement in the coup.

== Bombings ==
On 5 March, William F. Courtney, deputy chief of the embassy, received a call from a man identifying himself as DuPont and demanding all Americans leave Gabon. Two other phone calls threatening an imminent attack were received by the United States Information Service. During a rainstorm about 8:15 that night, a small bomb exploded outside the embassy. The explosion, which occurred at a time when the building was closed and locked, resulted in damage to the embassy sign and the cracking of two windows.

Following the bombing, French Gabonese made more threatening phone calls to the embassy. A second bomb exploded roughly 50 feet from the embassy two nights later, causing no damage. A drive-by shooting, during which at least five rounds of buckshot were fired from a 12-gauge automatic shotgun, riddled the second story windows with over 30 holes. William Courtney, the American chargé d'affaires, noticed two Europeans in a Simca automobile drive past the embassy at roughly 9:20 PM, one hour before the shooting and bombing. An unnamed American official said that he saw a car circle the embassy 10 minutes after the bombing. Two Gabonese policemen were assigned to protect the building, and M'ba ordered an investigation into the bombings. He denounced the allegations against Americans, saying:

Nothing permits to determine that the United States played a role in the recent events. However, relations of friendship existing between members of the United States Embassy and some politicians who participated in the rebellion could have given this impression to some, an impression which I do not share.

== See also ==
- Attacks on the United States
