= Barbro Owens-Kirkpatrick =

American diplomat

Barbro A. Owens-Kirkpatrick (born in Helsinki 1946) is an American diplomat.

== Early life and education ==
Owens-Kirkpatrick earned a Bachelor of Arts in Economics from the Helsinki School of Economics in Finland. She received her Master of Public Administration from the Woodrow Wilson School of Public and International Affairs at Princeton University.

== Career ==
Owens-Kirkpatrick joined the United States Department of State and was one of two State Department Political Officers deployed to support the 82nd Airborne Division during the invasion of Grenada in 1983.

Owens-Kirkpatrick served at Deputy Chief of Mission at the U.S. embassies in Barbados and the West Indies. She also served as Political Officer in El Salvador 1986-88 and as Special Assistant to the U.S. Ambassador to the United Nations.

In 1989 she graduated from the U.S. Army War College.

From 1992 to 1993, she was deputy director of the Office of International Security Operations (PM/ISO) in the Bureau of Political-Military Affairs at the State Department. Her team participated in establishing U.S. policy and coordinating global crisis management with Department of Defense counterparts, including in Bosnia, northern Iraq, and Somalia. Owens-Kirkpatrick was promoted from this job into the Senior Foreign Service in 1993.

From 1993 to 1994, she was Director of Inter-American Affairs at the National Security Council, focusing on Cuba, the Haiti crisis, Central and South America.

Ambassador Owens-Kirkpatrick was Minister Counselor for Political Affairs at the U.S. Embassy in Mexico City from 1994 to 1997, a crucial period in Mexico's transition from authoritarian government to democracy, and the start-up of the Chiapas rebellion.

From 1997 to 1998, she was Director of the Office of European Security and Political Affairs (EUR/RPM) in the State Department. As head of this large office tasked with day-to-day management of U.S. policy at NATO and the OSCE, Ambassador Owens-Kirkpatrick played a key role in NATO's enlargement, NATO's relations with its partners, management of the Kosovo crisis, and organizing NATO's 50th anniversary.

She was promoted to the personal rank of Minister Counselor in 1999, and sworn in as U.S. Ambassador to Niger on September 10, 1999. She left her post on July 12, 2002.

== Awards and recognitions ==
Owens-Kirkpatrick has received three individual Superior Honor Awards.

== Personal life ==
Owens-Kirkpatrick speaks French, Spanish, Swedish, and Finnish.

She is married to a fellow Foreign Service Officer, Alexander Kirkpatrick. They have two children.

== See also ==
- Plame affair
