= Larry C. Williamson =

American diplomat (1930–2014)

Larry C. Williamson (May 16, 1930 Fort Smith, Arkansas – April 11, 2014) was an American Career Foreign Service Officer who held concurrent appointments as the American Ambassador Extraordinary and Plenipotentiary to Gabon and São Tomé and Príncipe from 1984 until 1987.

== Biography ==
Williamson joined the Marine Corps at 17, after graduating from high school, and fought in the Korean War as a lieutenant. First he went to the University of Louisville on a NROTC (Naval Reserve Officers’ Training Corps) scholarship before the Korean War broke out and he was on active duty. When he returned stateside, he got advanced degrees from the University of California, Berkeley. He joined the Foreign Service in 1958. He died due to complications from Lewy Body Dementia and had been a resident of Vienna, Virginia at the time.
