= Kwajalein Atoll =

Atoll in the Marshall Islands

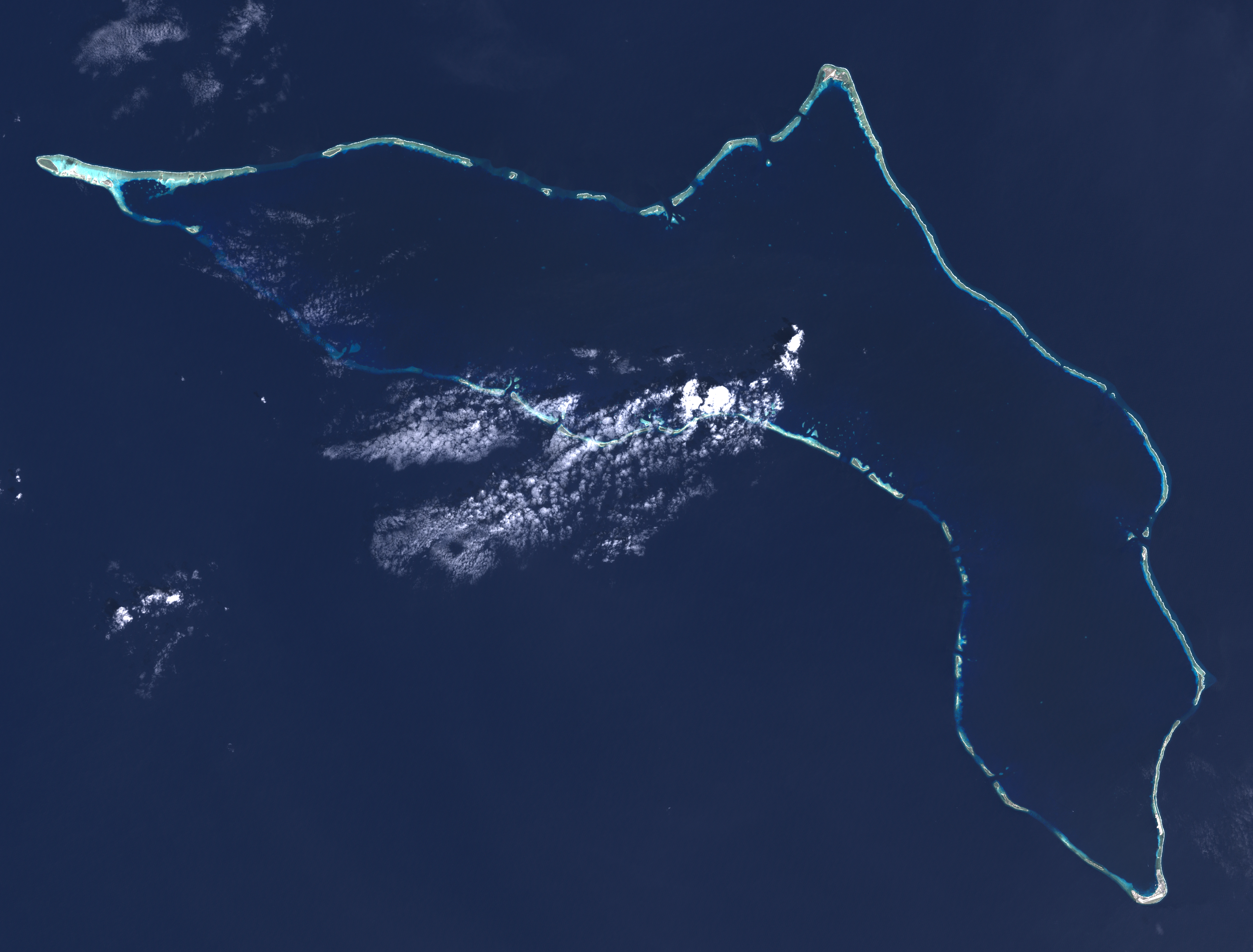
- Landsat satellite image of Kwajalein Atoll

- Map of the Marshall Islands highlighting the Kwajalein atoll

- Location within the Marshall Islands Kwajalein Atoll (Pacific Ocean)

Geography
- Location: North Pacific Ocean
- Coordinates: 8°43′N 167°44′E
- Archipelago: Ralik

Administration
- Marshall Islands

Demographics
- Population: 9,789 (2021)

Additional information
- Time zone: MHT (UTC+12)

Flag of Kwajalein Atoll until February 2022

Kwajalein Atoll (/ˈkwɑːdʒəlɪn/; Marshallese: Kuwajleen [kʷuwɑzʲ(ɛ)lʲɛːnʲ]) is part of the Republic of the Marshall Islands (RMI). The southernmost and largest island in the atoll is named Kwajalein Island, which its majority English-speaking residents (about 1,000 mostly U.S. civilian personnel) often shorten to Kwaj /kwɑːdʒ/. The total land area of the atoll is just over 6 square miles (16 km^{2}). It lies in the Ralik Chain, 2,100 nautical miles (3,900 km; 2,400 mi) southwest of Honolulu, Hawaii.

Kwajalein Island has hosted a U.S. Army base since World War II. It was the final resting place of the German cruiser Prinz Eugen after it survived the Operation Crossroads nuclear test in 1946. In the late 1950s, the U.S. Army took over the base as part of their Nike Zeus anti-ballistic missile efforts, and since then the atoll has been widely used for missile tests of all sorts. Today it is part of the Ronald Reagan Ballistic Missile Defense Test Site, with various radars, tracking cameras, missile launchers, and many support systems spread across many islands. One of the five ground stations used in controlling the operation of the Global Positioning System (GPS) navigation system is located on Kwajalein.

The Marshall Islands are a dependent nation through the Free Compact of Association with the United States, after their independence established in the 1980s from a U.N. Protectorate. The defense of the Kwajalein, and the Marshall Islands is the responsibility of the United States. The important missile test range has been a mutually agreed task, and many Marshalese work at the military bases.

The atoll is also used as a base for orbital rocket launches with the Pegasus-XL rocket, and previously had a base for SpaceX for their Falcon 1 rocket.

== Geography ==
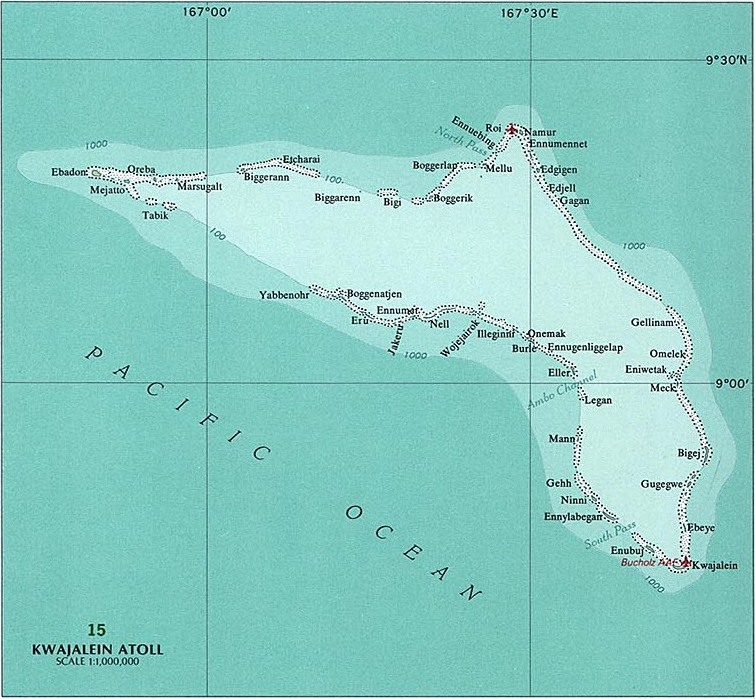
Map from National Atlas of the United States

Kwajalein is the 14th largest coral atoll as measured by area of enclosed water. Comprising 97 islands and islets, it has a land area of 16.4 km^{2} (6.3 sq mi) and surrounds one of the largest lagoons in the world, with an area of 2,174 km^{2} (839 sq mi). The average height above sea level for all the islands is about 1.8 m (6 ft).

The atoll was formed when volcanoes on the seabed from 165 to 76 mya built up enough lava that the land rose from beneath the sea. It cannot be determined how far above sea level the original land rose. Then coral started growing around the land/volcano, about 56 mya. Then the land subsided, leaving the coral ring of the atoll. The water temperature averages 27 °C (81 °F) degrees. Underwater visibility is typically 30 m (100 ft) on the ocean side of the atoll.

The atoll has an extended oval shape, running roughly WNW-ESE on the western side and then bending to run almost due south on the eastern side. It is bordered by its three largest islands, Ebadon, Roi-Namur, and Kwajalein, located at the extreme western, northern, and southern points, respectively. Roi-Namur is about 70 km (43 mi) east of Ebadon and 80 km (50 mi) NWN of Kwajalein. The atoll is 3,400 km (2,100 mi) from Honolulu, 3,200 km (2,000 mi) from Australia, and 3,400 km (2,100 mi) from Japan. Kwajalein Island is about 800 km (500 mi) north of the equator.

Islands often have alternate names: The first is the Marshallese name, the second was assigned somewhat arbitrarily by the U.S. Navy prior to their attack on the atoll during World War II. The original name was considered too difficult for English speakers to properly differentiate among the islands. The latter has often been retained by English speakers. The exception to this is Kwajalein itself, which is close to the native name; the received spelling, however, is from German.

=== Kwajalein Island ===
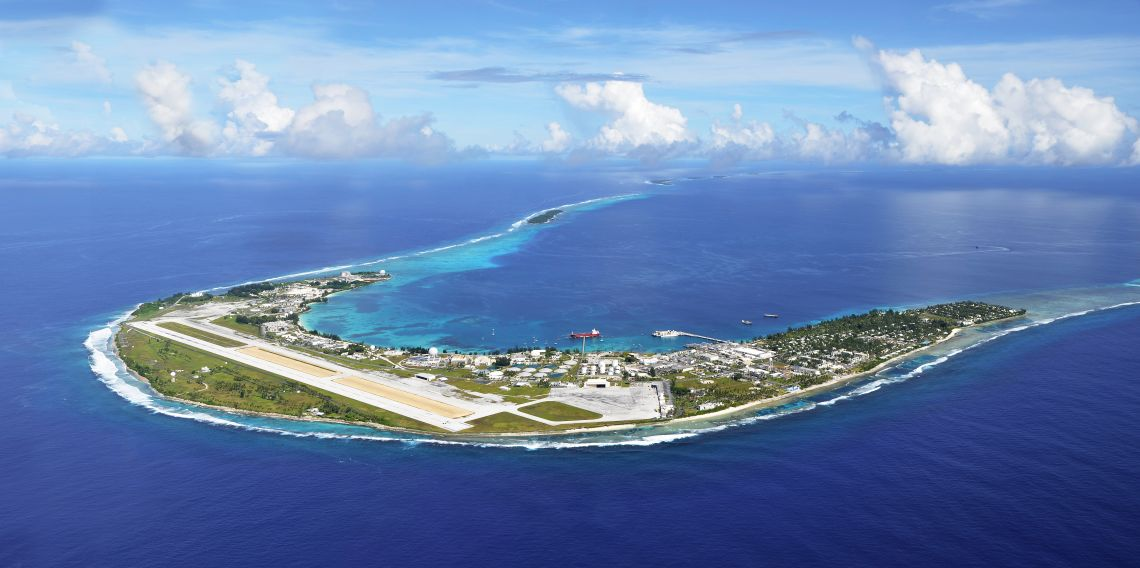
Kwajalein island with Bucholz Army Airfield

Kwajalein Island is the southernmost and largest of the islands in the atoll. The area is about 3.1 km^{2} (1.2 mi^{2}). It is 4.0 km (2.5 mi) long and averages about 730 m (800 yd) wide. To enlarge the island, the Americans placed fill at both the northwestern part of the island above the pier (within the atoll, by 1953), the northern part extending towards Ebeye, and the southwestern parts of the island (by 1970). The northern extension was used for housing, while the remainder was used for industrial purposes.

Kwajalein Island's population is about 1,000, mostly made up of Americans with a small number of Marshall Islanders and other nationalities, all of whom require express permission from the U.S. Army to live there. Some 13,500 Marshallese citizens live on the atoll, most of them on Ebeye Island.

==== Passes near Kwajalein Island ====
- SAR Pass (Search And Rescue Pass) is the closest to Kwajalein on the West Reef. This pass is man-made and was created in the mid-1950s. It is very narrow and shallow compared to the natural passes in the lagoon, and is used only by small boats.
- South Pass is on the West Reef, north of SAR Pass. It is very wide.
- Gea Pass is a deep water pass between Gea and Ninni islands.
- Bigej Pass is the first pass on the East reef north of Kwajalein and Ebeye.

=== Other large islands ===
Other islands in the atoll: (Note: Based partly on testimony of islanders and on Carucci (1997).)

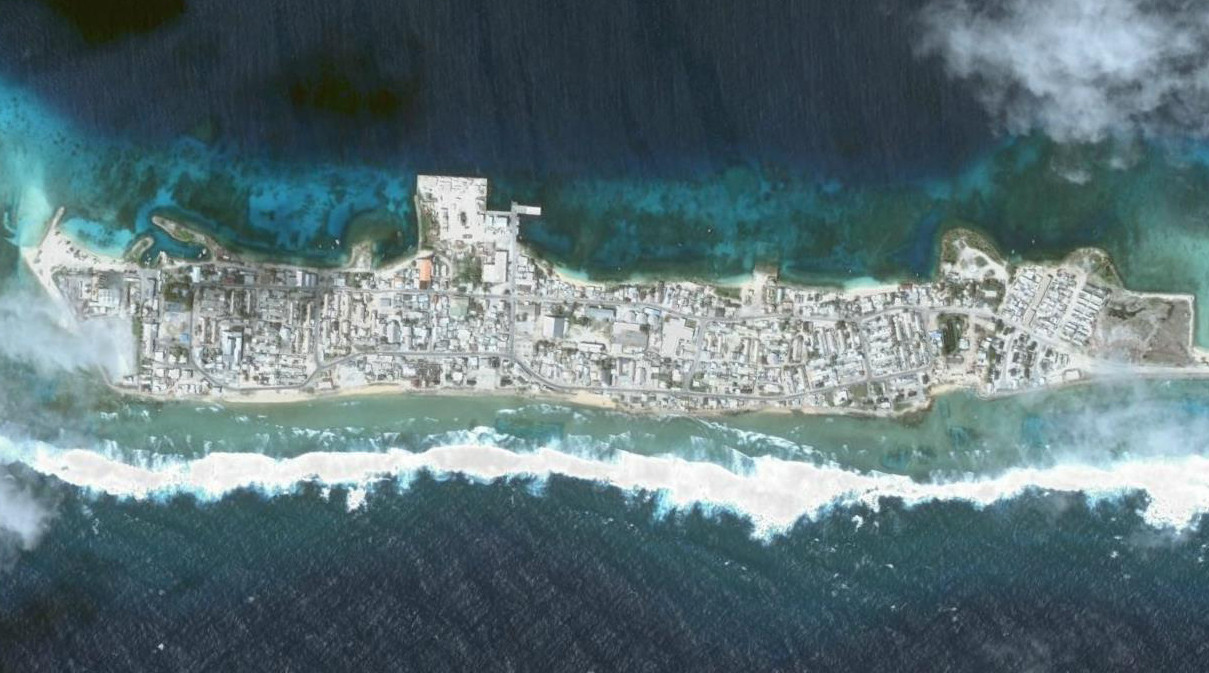
The most populated island of Kwajalein Atoll, the island city of Ebeye

Ebeye is about 7.2 km (4.5 mi) north of eastern end of Kwajalein Island. It is not part of the Reagan Test Site; it is a Marshallese island-city with shops, restaurants, and an active commercial port. It is the administrative center of the Republic of the Marshall Islands at Kwajalein Atoll and the Kwajalein Atoll Local Government (KALGOV). It has the largest population in the atoll, with approximately 13,000 residents living on 32 ha (80 acres) of land. Inhabitants are mostly Marshall Islanders but include a small population of migrants and volunteers from other island groups and nations.

Ebeye is one of the most densely populated places in the world. Many of its residents live in poverty. A coral reef (visible and able to be traveled at low tide) links them to Kwajalein and the rest of the outside world. A causeway at the northern end of the island provides a roadway that connects to several other islands, forming a chain of inhabited islands about 10 km (6.2 mi) long. Connected islands include Loi, Shell, and Gugeegue.

Ebadon (Epatōn, [ɛbʲɑdˠʌnʲ]) is located at the westernmost tip of the atoll. It was the second-largest island in the atoll before the formation of Roi-Namur. Like Ebeye, it falls fully under the jurisdiction of the Republic of the Marshall Islands and is not part of the Reagan Test Site. The village of Ebadon was much more heavily populated before the war, and it was where some of the irooj (chiefs) of Kwajalein Atoll grew up. Like many other key islets in the atoll, it has significant cultural and spiritual significance in Marshallese cosmology.

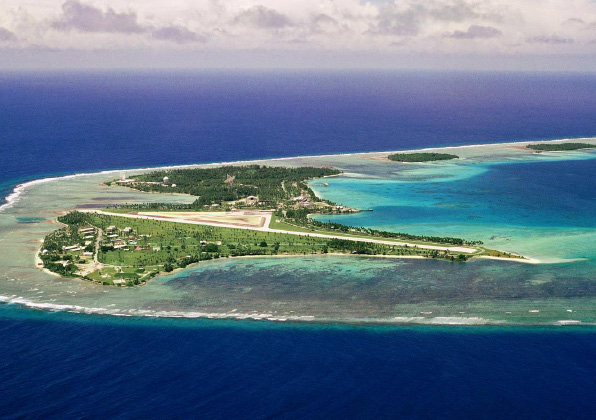
Roi-Namur island

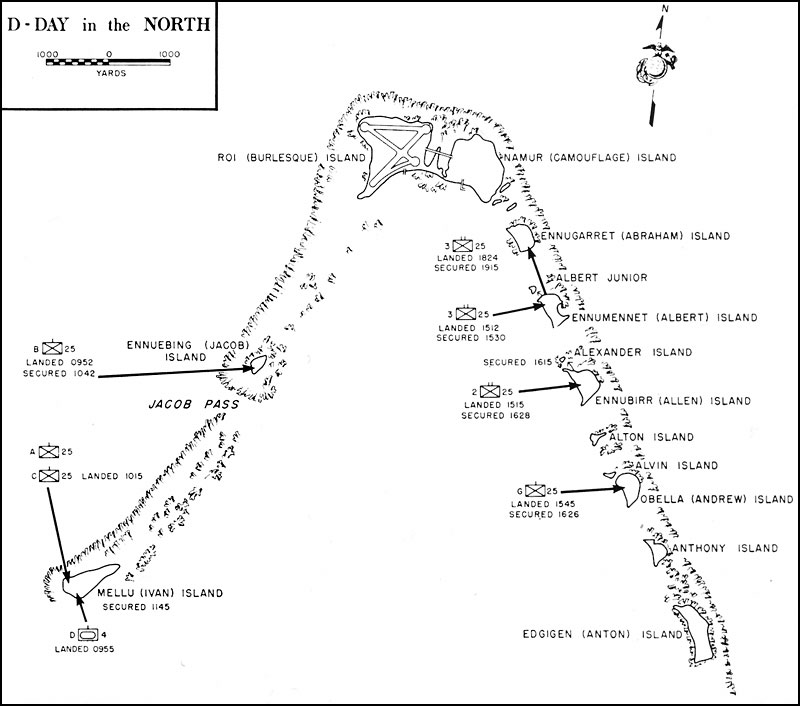
Northern section of Kwajalein Atoll, with the now joined islands of Roi and Namur

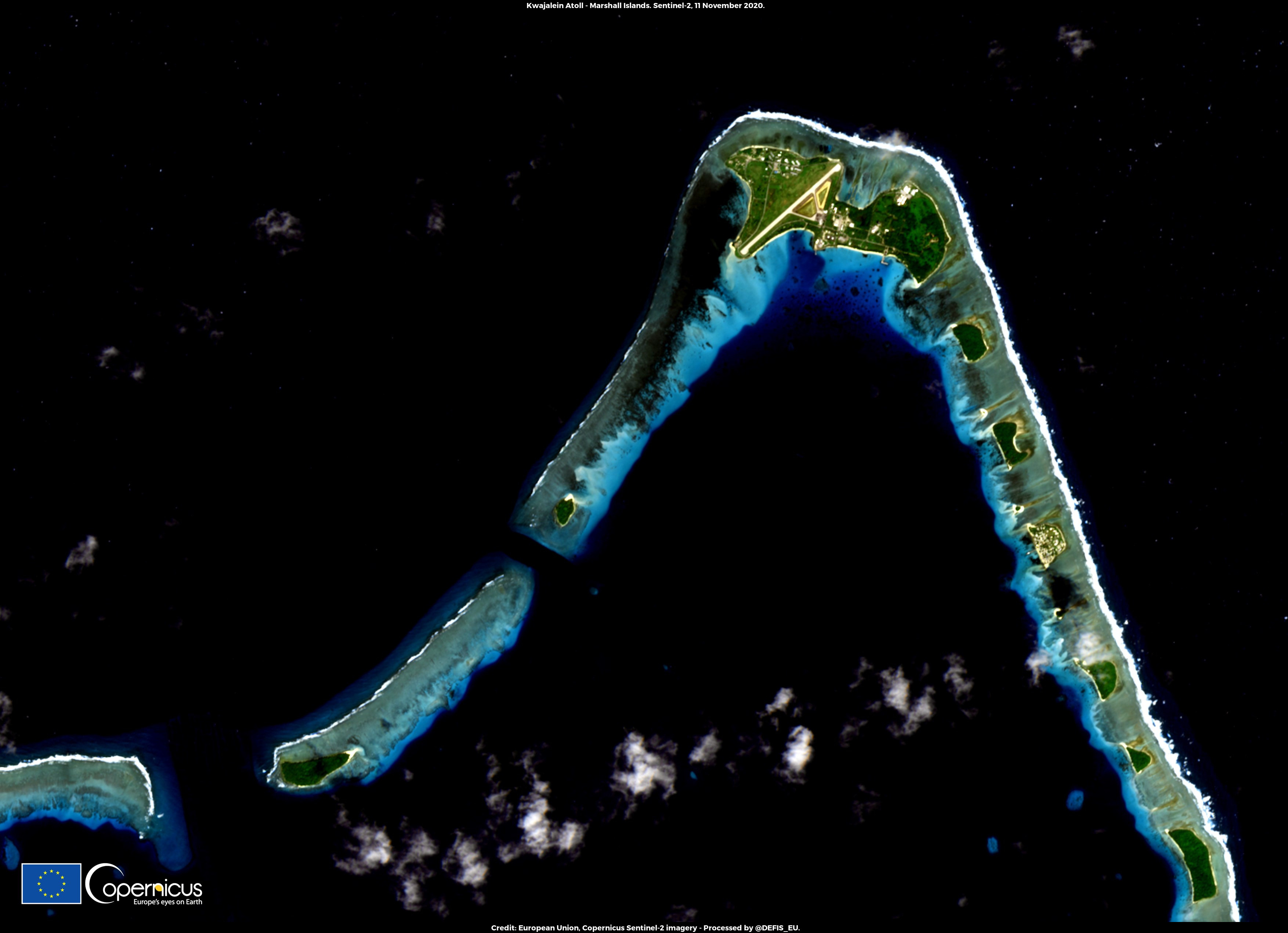
Satellite photo of the northern Kwajalein Atoll, including Roi-Maur

Roi-Namur is the northernmost island in the atoll, located some distance north of Kwajalein. It has several radar installations and a small residential community of unaccompanied U.S. personnel who deal with mission support and radar tracking. It also has a number of Japanese bunkers and buildings from World War II which are preserved in good condition. Roi-Namur used to be four islands: Roi, Namur, Enedrikdrik (Ane-dikdik), and Kottepina. Roi and Namur were joined by a causeway built by forced laborers working under the Japanese military; it was filled with sand that was dredged from the lagoon by both the Japanese and later American administrations between 1940 and 1945. After the war, the resulting conjoined islands were renamed Roi-Namur. There is a significant indigenous Marshall Islander workforce that commutes from the nearby island of Ennubirr to Roi-Namur, much as workers commute from Ebeye to Kwajalein. These workers are badged and have limited access to the island, although access is granted for islanders who need to use the air terminal to fly to Kwajalein.

=== Smaller islands ===
==== Eastern side ====
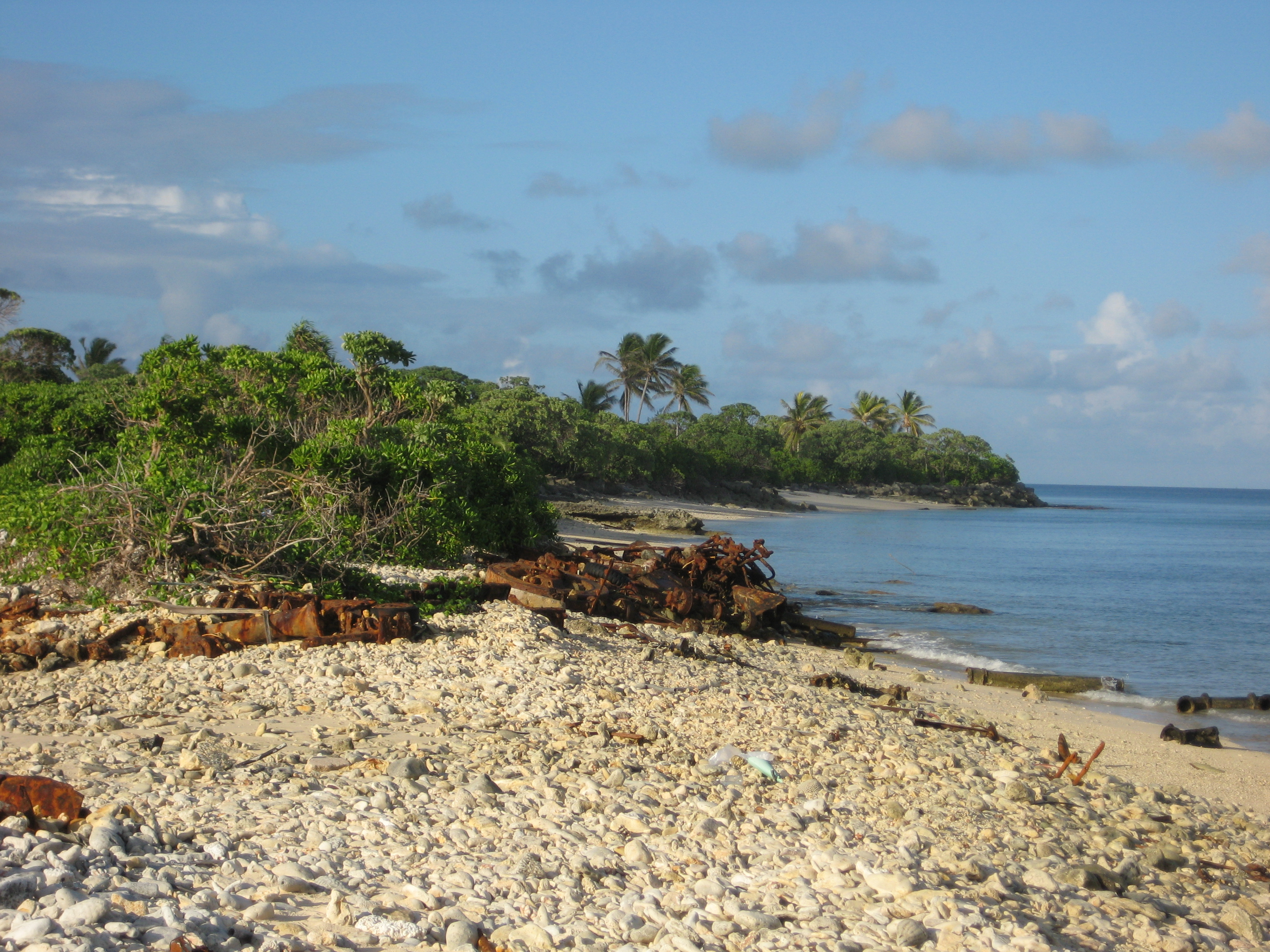
Looking south along Gugeegue's shoreline

Little Bustard (Orpāp, [worˠ(ɤ)bʲæpʲ]) and Big Bustard (Epjā-dik, [ɛbʲ(ɛ)zʲæːrʲik], 'little Ebeye') are the first and second islets respectively north of Kwajalein island on the East reef, and are the only islets between Kwajalein and Ebeye. During low tide and with protective boots, it is possible to wade across the reef between Kwajalein and Little Bustard.

Gugeegue or Gugegwe (/ˈɡuːdʒiɡuː/ GOO-jee-goo; Marshallese: Kōn̄e-jekāān-eņ, [kɤŋeːzʲɛɡæːnʲɛːnˠ]) is an islet north of Ebeye and is the northernmost point of the concrete causeway connecting the islets between them. Gugeegue is just south of the Bigej Pass, which separates it from the Bigej islet.

Bigej, just north of the Ebeye chain, is covered with tropical palm trees and jungle. People from Kwajalein have visited it for picnics and camping. It is a site of cultural significance to the indigenous people of Kwajalein Atoll, as are most of the small islands throughout the atoll. Some Kwajalein atoll landowners have proposed developing Bigej to look similar to the landscaped beauty of Kwajalein islet, for the exclusive use of Kwajalein atoll landowners and their families.

Meck is about 31 km (19 mi) north of Kwajalein. It is a launch site for anti-ballistic missiles and is probably the most restricted island of all the U.S.-leased sites. It was originally built up as part of the Nike-X program, as the main island of Kwajalein was already filled with equipment from the earlier Nike Zeus program, some of which remained in use during Nike-X testing. A large berm was built on the northern end of the island to support the missile silos, while a Missile Site Radar was built to its south, on the western side. An airstrip, somewhat longer than 300 m (1,000 ft) running north–south at the southeastern end of the island provided STOL service to the base, although the strong prevailing winds from the west made for very tricky landings. Air service was later deemed too dangerous and replaced by helicopter pads at either end of the runway. After the Army's main ABM programs shut down in the 1970s, Meck has served as the primary launch site for a variety of follow-on programs, including the Homing Overlay Experiment and THAAD, among many others.

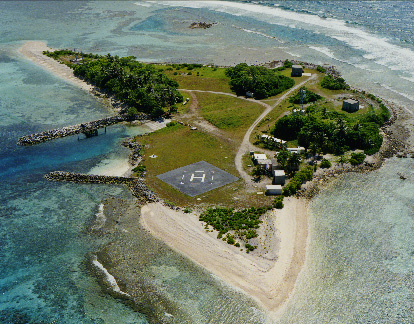
Omelek

Omelek, about 5 km (3.1 mi) north of Meck, is uninhabited and leased by the U.S. military. From 2006 to 2009, SpaceX used it to launch five Falcon 1 rockets.

=== Western side ===
Enubuj (Āne-buoj, [ænʲeːbˠuotʲ]), or "Carlson" Islet, which was its 1944 World War II U.S. operation codename, is situated next to Kwajalein to the northwest, directly west of Little Bustard. It was from this island that U.S. forces launched their amphibious invasion of Kwajalein Island. Today, it is the site of a small Marshallese village, a church, and a small cemetery. The sunken vessel Prinz Eugen, used during the Bikini Atoll atomic weapons tests, is along the islet's northern lagoon side.

Ennylabegan (Āneeļļap-kaņ, [ænʲeːllˠɑbʲ(ɛ)ɡɑnˠ]), or "Carlos" Islet, is the site of a small Marshall Islander community that has decreased in size in recent decades; it was once a bigger village. Until 2012, it was actively used by the Reagan Test Site for telemetry tracking activities during missions and has been one of the only non-restricted Marshallese-populated islands used by the United States Army. As such, power and clean drinking water were provided to half of the island, similar to the other military-leased islands. This has been phased out as the island no longer serves as a mission support site. The power plant, which also performed water treatment, is no longer in use.

Legan (Am̧bo, [ɑmbˠo]) is uninhabited, but it has a few buildings on the southern part. Most of the island is thick and jungle-covered, like most in the Marshall Islands. Unlike most islands, Legan has a very small lake in the middle.

Illeginni was used as a remote launch site for Sprint and Spartan missiles during the 1970s, with Meck as the primary control center. Coral soil dredged from the northeastern tip of the island was piled up to build a berm supporting the missile launchers. Several remotely controlled tracking cameras and other devices were also built on the island and serviced by boats or helicopters landing on a pad at the western end of the island. Today, a single tracking camera remains in use, along with telemetry equipment to support it. Illeginni was used successfully for the first Minuteman III missile land impact test in 1980. It also hosts one of the two remote receivers for the Tradex radar, the other being on Gellinam, with the main radar on Roi-Namur.

Nell has a convergence of protected channels and small islands. The Nell area is a popular destination for locals and Americans sailing through it, provided they have proper permission from the Republic of the Marshall Islands (all non-leased islands are strictly off-limits to American base residents and personnel without prior permission).

Enmat (Enm̧aat, [ɛnʲ(ʌ)mˠɑːtˠ]), birthplace of the Irooj (chiefly families) is mo̧ or taboo, and therefore off-limits to anyone without the blessing of the Iroijlaplap (paramount chief). The remains of a small Marshallese village and burial sites are still intact. This island is in the Mid-Atoll Corridor, and no one can reside there or on the surrounding islands due to missile tests.

=== Wrecks in the lagoon ===
Because of the Battle of Kwajalein of World War II, the lagoon contains the wrecks of many ships and aircraft. Most of the ships were merchant vessels.

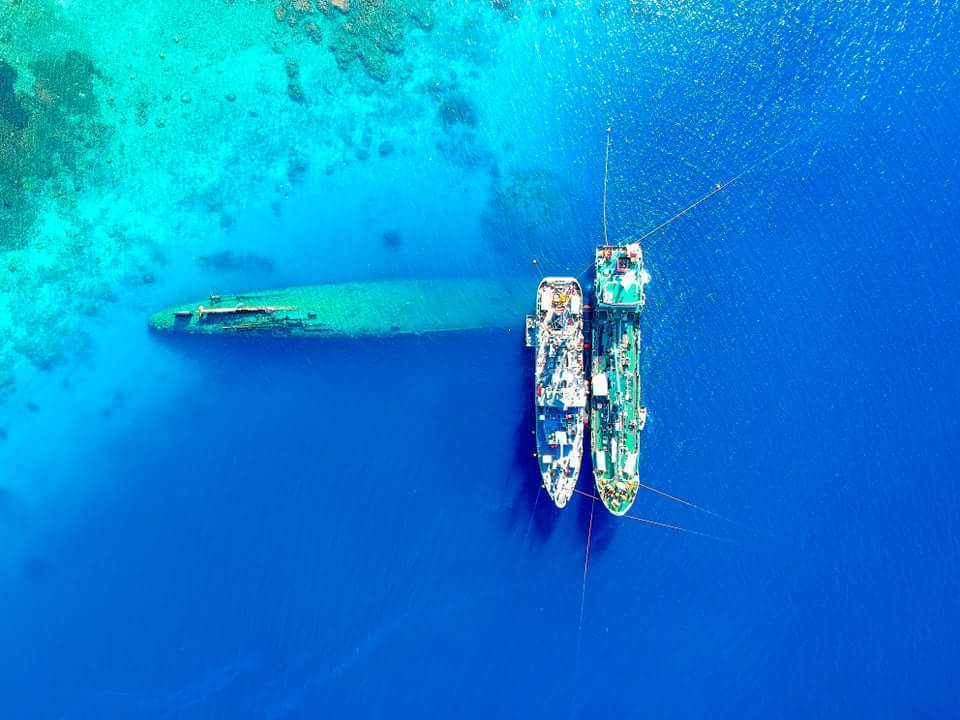
USNS Salvor and the tanker Humber draining oil from the Prinz Eugen wreck in September 2018

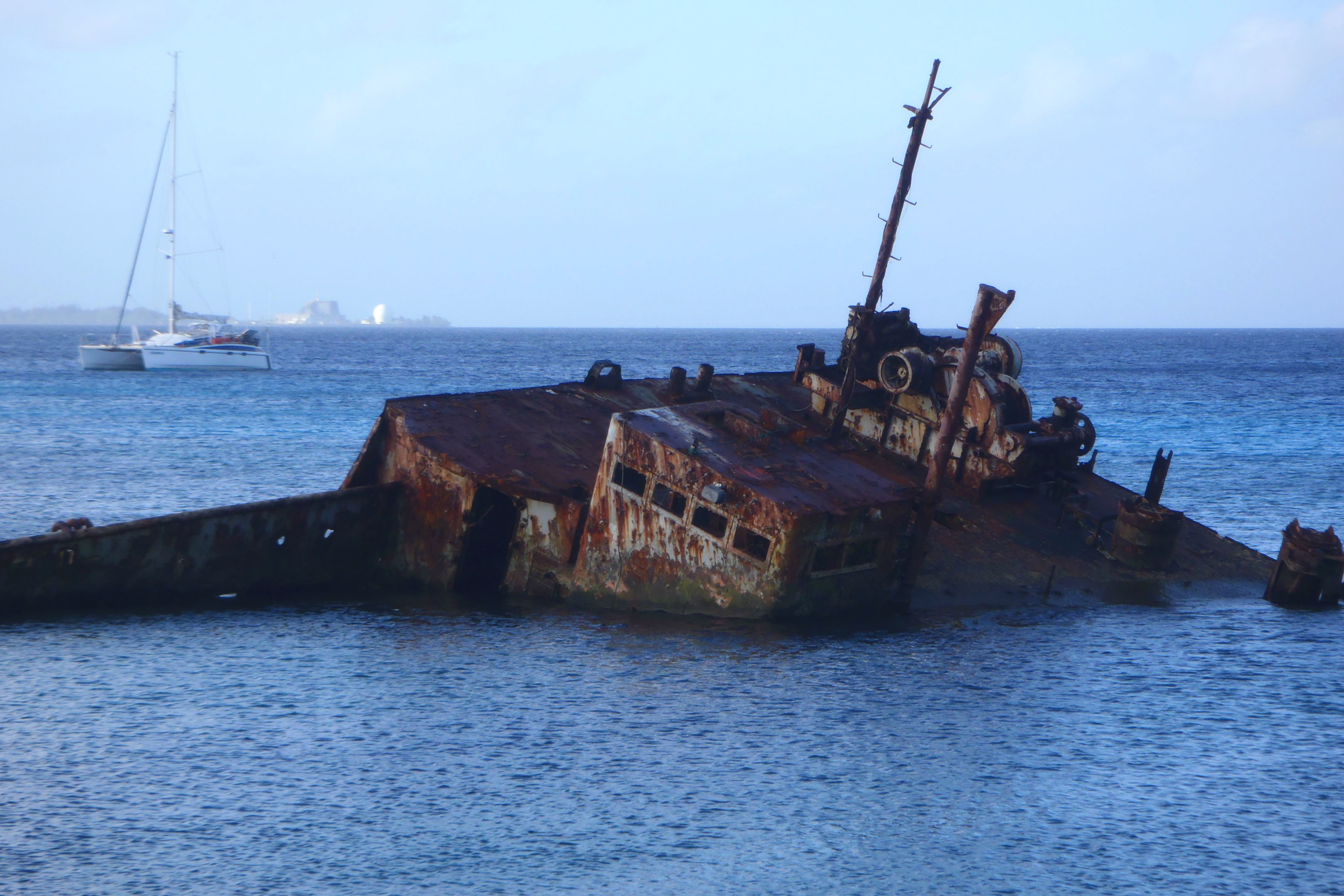
Ship wreck near Ebeye

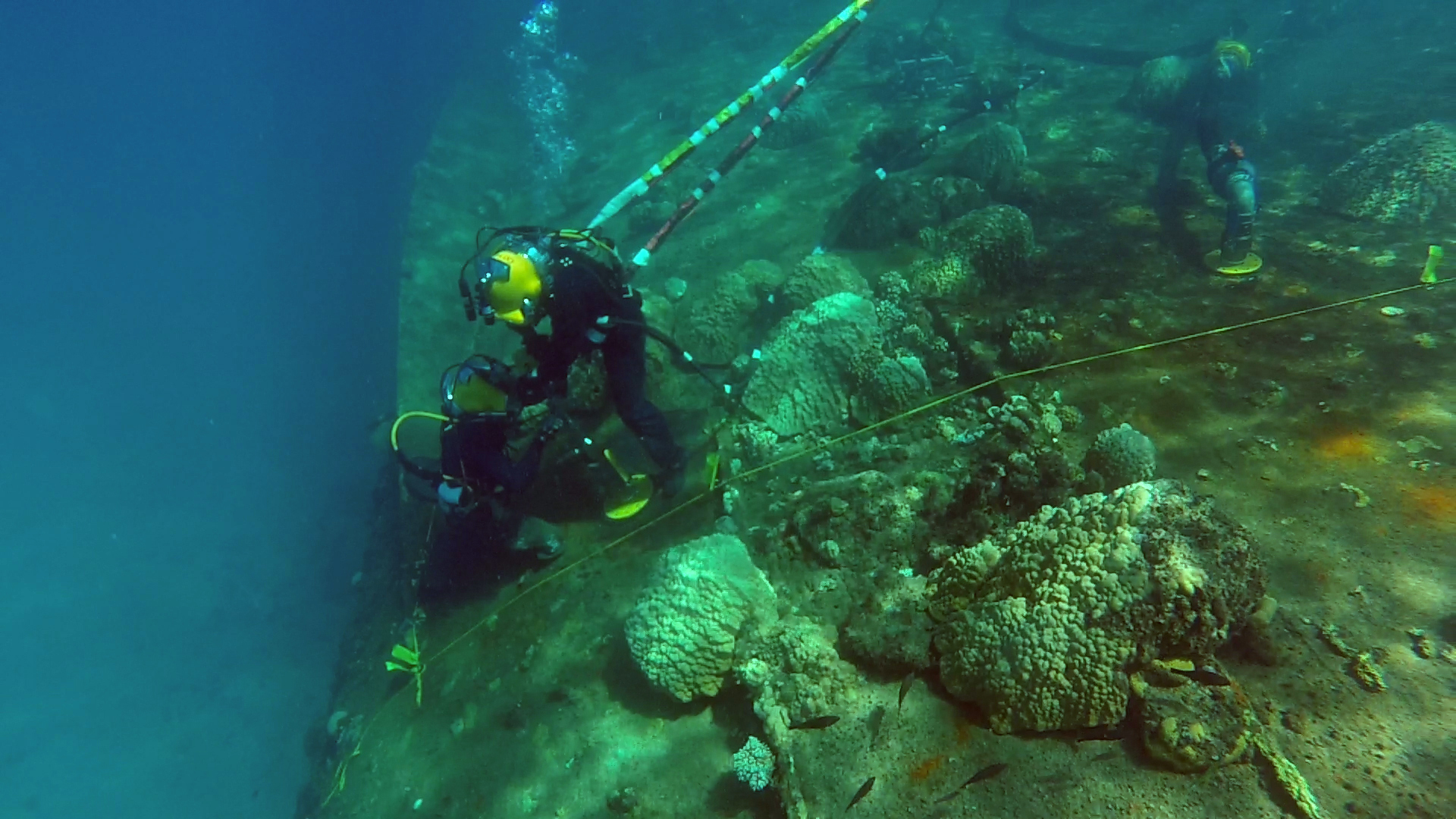
Divers visit the wreck of the Prinz Eugen in 2018

- Concrete barge Chromite (BCL-2570) – deliberately sunk as a breakwater near Ennylabegan (Carlos)
- Prinz Eugen – sunk by accident near Enubuj (Carlson) after a post-war atomic bomb test
- Akibasan Maru – Japanese 4,607-ton freighter below "P-buoy" with the actual buoy marker no longer there. Sunk 30 January 1944.
- Ikuta Maru – 2,968-ton Japanese freighter at "P-North" just north of the now missing P-buoy. This is listed as being one of the transports for Allied prisoners of war during World War II.
- Unidentified wreck at G-buoy, 35 m (115 ft) in length
- Tateyama Maru, K-5 side
- Asakaze Maru, K-5 upright
- Tyoko Maru (or Choko Maru), a 3,535-ton freighter, at Barracuda Junction. Sunk December 5, 1943.
- Barge, between South Carlson and Sar Pass
- Wooden auxiliary sub chaser wreck near South Pass. The wooden hull has almost completely deteriorated.
- Shonan Maru #6, grounded at Gebh Island to avoid sinking but blown up
- Shell (or Ebwaj) Island wreck. 34 m (110 ft) trawler or whaler.
- South Shell wreck, similar to the Shell Island wreck
- Daisan Maru, a former whaler, near Bigej Pass
- Palawan, an engine freighter captured by the Japanese during the Battle of the Philippines. Sunk by the U.S. destroyer Harrison January 31, 1944, near Bigej.
- Shoei Maru, a sunken freighter resting upside down at the O-buoy
- A Japanese aircraft just west of Ebeye
- A Martin PBM Mariner about 1 nautical mile west of Ebeye
- Four North American B-25 Mitchells, a Grumman TBF Avenger, a Vought F4U Corsair, four Douglas SBD Dauntlesses, and a Curtiss C-46 Commando in the western reef inside Roi-Namur

Barracuda Junction is about 1.6 km (1 mi) northeast of the southern tip of Enubuj (Carlson) Island.

=== Climate ===
The atoll has a tropical rainforest climate under the Köppen climate classification. The average temperature varies less than 1.1 °C (2 °F) from month to month. The record low from 1950 to 1969 was 21 °C (70 °F). The highest temperature was 36 °C (97 °F). While tropical rainforest climates have no true dry season, the atoll's noticeably drier season occurs from January through March. The average annual rainfall was 2,570 millimetres (101.2 in). The average monthly relative humidity is between 78 and 83%.

Climate data for Kwajalein Atoll
Month	Jan	Feb	Mar	Apr	May	Jun	Jul	Aug	Sep	Oct	Nov	Dec	Year
Record high °C (°F)	32.2 (90.0)	32.2 (90.0)	32.2 (90.0)	32.2 (90.0)	32.8 (91.0)	32.2 (90.0)	32.8 (91.0)	32.8 (91.0)	33.3 (91.9)	33.3 (91.9)	33.3 (91.9)	31.7 (89.1)	33.3 (91.9)
Mean daily maximum °C (°F)	29.9 (85.8)	30.3 (86.5)	30.6 (87.1)	30.4 (86.7)	30.4 (86.7)	30.4 (86.7)	30.4 (86.7)	30.6 (87.1)	30.6 (87.1)	30.6 (87.1)	30.4 (86.7)	30.1 (86.2)	30.4 (86.7)
Daily mean °C (°F)	27.4 (81.3)	27.7 (81.9)	27.9 (82.2)	27.8 (82.0)	27.8 (82.0)	27.8 (82.0)	27.7 (81.9)	27.9 (82.2)	27.8 (82.0)	27.9 (82.2)	27.8 (82.0)	27.6 (81.7)	27.8 (82.0)
Mean daily minimum °C (°F)	25.0 (77.0)	25.1 (77.2)	25.2 (77.4)	25.2 (77.4)	25.2 (77.4)	25.1 (77.2)	25.1 (77.2)	25.1 (77.2)	25.1 (77.2)	25.2 (77.4)	25.2 (77.4)	25.2 (77.4)	25.1 (77.2)
Record low °C (°F)	20.0 (68.0)	21.7 (71.1)	21.1 (70.0)	21.7 (71.1)	21.7 (71.1)	21.7 (71.1)	21.7 (71.1)	21.7 (71.1)	20.0 (68.0)	21.7 (71.1)	21.1 (70.0)	20.6 (69.1)	20.0 (68.0)
Average precipitation mm (inches)	115.8 (4.56)	82.0 (3.23)	104.1 (4.10)	191.8 (7.55)	253.5 (9.98)	244.3 (9.62)	265.2 (10.44)	256.8 (10.11)	300.5 (11.83)	302.5 (11.91)	270.8 (10.66)	205.7 (8.10)	2,593 (102.09)
Average precipitation days (≥ 1.0 mm)	10.2	8.4	10.6	12.7	17.7	18.7	19.5	20.0	19.8	19.9	18.3	15.0	190.8
Average relative humidity (%)	76.7	76.1	77.1	79.7	82.5	82.0	81.8	80.9	80.9	80.8	80.2	78.8	79.8
Source: NOAA

== History ==
Kwajalein (Kuwajleen) Atoll is an important cultural site to the Marshallese people of the Ralik chain. In Marshallese cosmology, Kwajalein island is the site of an abundant flowering zebra wood tree, thought to have spiritual powers. Marshallese from other islands came to gather the "fruits" of this tree.

This, explain many elders, is a Marshallese metaphor that describes the past century of colonialism and serves to explain why Kwajalein is still so precious to foreign interests. This story was the origin of the name Kuwajleen, which apparently derives from Ri-ruk-jan-leen, "the people who harvest the flowers".

=== First sighting by Europeans ===
The first recorded sighting of Kwajalein by Europeans was during the Spanish expedition of Ruy López de Villalobos in January 1543. The atoll was charted as Los Jardines (The Gardens) because of its fresh appearance and trees. Los Jardines remained well located in most 16th and 17th century charts in the 8–10°N, as reported by the Villalobos expedition chroniclers. However, at some point in the late 18th century, due to some transcription error from the old Spanish maps, they start to appear in the nautical charts shifted northwards to 21°N, thus creating phantom islands of Los Jardines that, even if sought and never found, remained on charts of the Pacific until 1973.

The atoll came under the control of Spain but was largely ignored by European powers during the 17th and 18th centuries except for some short-lived missionary expeditions, minor trading posts and demarcation treaties between the Iberian kingdoms (Portugal and Spain).

In 1828–1829, Imperial Russian Navy captain Ludwig von Hagemeister made his final circumnavigation on the ship Krotky. During this journey, he surveyed the Menshikov Atoll (Kwajalein) in the Marshall Islands, plotting it on the map and specifying the location of some other islands. At the time, the atoll was known as Kuadelen and Kabajaia to Spain.

In early November 1875, a typhoon resulted in an 8 feet (2.4 m) storm surge, drowning everyone on Kwajalein Island.

The German Empire annexed the Marshall Islands, including Kwajalein Atoll, as a protectorate on October 15, 1885.

=== Japan in the Nan'yō: 1875–1945 ===
Japan had developed an interest in what it called the "South Seas" (南洋, Nan'yō) in the 19th century, prior to its imperial expansion into Korea and China. By 1875, ships from the newly established Imperial Japanese Navy began to hold training missions in the area. Shigetaka Shiga, a writer who accompanied a Navy cruise to the region in 1886, published his Current State of Affairs in the South Seas (南洋時事, Nan'yō jiji) in 1887, marking the first time a Japanese civilian published a firsthand account of Micronesia. Three years later, Shiga advocated for annexation of the area by claiming that doing so would "excite an expeditionary spirit in the demoralized Japanese race."

Despite the appeal imperialism had for the Japanese public at the time, neither the Meiji government nor the Navy seized any pretexts to fulfill this popular aspiration. It was through the commercial operations of fisherman and traders that the Japanese first began to make a wider presence in the region, which continued to grow despite challenges from competing German commercial interests.

At the outbreak of World War I in Europe, Japan joined the Triple Entente and seized the Marshall Islands against only token resistance. In 1922 the islands were placed under Japanese administration as a League of Nations Mandate, whereupon it was referred to as Kwezerin-kanshō (クェゼリン環礁) in Japan, part of the Nan'yō gunto. The islands of the Kwajalein Atoll, especially the main island, served as a rural copra-trading outpost administered by Japanese civilians until the beginning of World War II in the Pacific in December 1941.

Before the Pacific War, Japanese settlement in Kwajalein Atoll consisted mostly of traders and their families who worked at local branches of shops headquartered at nearby Jaluit Atoll. There were also local administrative staff at Kwajalein. With the establishment of Kwajalein's public school in 1935, schoolteachers were sent to the island from Japan. Most Marshall Islanders who recall those times describe a peaceful time of cooperation and development between Japanese and Marshallese, although the latter were not considered on the same social tier as Japanese.

By the 1930s, immigration from the Japanese mainland had increased exponentially. In some regions of the Nan'yō, colonial settlers outnumbered Micronesian natives by as much as ten to one, amounting to the most significant violation of Japan's League of Nations mandate. In the furthest eastern areas, however, immigrants remained in the minority. Contemporary testimony and postwar investigations have attested that Japan honored their agreement under the mandate to administer the islands peacefully. Nevertheless, Kwajalein along with the rest of the territories in the Nan'yō began to be fortified militarily after Japan's departure from the League of Nations in 1933. With the assistance of the Imperial Japanese Navy, local infrastructure was improved between 1934 and 1939. The first combat units, from the Imperial Japanese Navy's 4th Fleet, arrived in February 1941. Prior to the attack on Pearl Harbor, militarization of the Nan'yō, including Kwajalein, had been considered meagre enough that it alarmed Admiral Shigeyoshi Inoue, who in January 1941 strongly urged the Ministry of the Navy to immediately expedite the process. A few months later, a naval officer stationed in Kwajalein sent a memorandum to the Naval Ministry denouncing the failure to ready the region for war. Both warnings were ignored by the Naval Ministry.

Korean forced laborers were ordered to work throughout the Pacific beginning in the early 1940s. Over 10,000 were sent to the Nan'yō area alone, mostly from the southernmost provinces of Chōsen. In some atolls, such as Wotje, those forced laborers were joined by Japanese prisoners from Hokkaido, most of them political dissidents. In order to build the aerial runway on Kwajalein Island, the Japanese public school was demolished and, along with the civil administration, moved to Namu Atoll. Islanders were forcibly moved to live on some of the smaller islets in the atoll. The trauma of this experience, together with the influx of these young and underprepared soldiers, surprised the local population. Islanders who survived this period make clear distinctions in their recollections of civilian and military Japanese for this reason. This is the first known instance of forced relocation in Kwajalein Atoll, although similar events took place throughout the Marshall Islands. Archaeological evidence as well as testimony from Japanese and Marshallese sources indicate that this militarization would likely not have begun until the 1940s; it was left incomplete at the time of the American invasion in 1944.

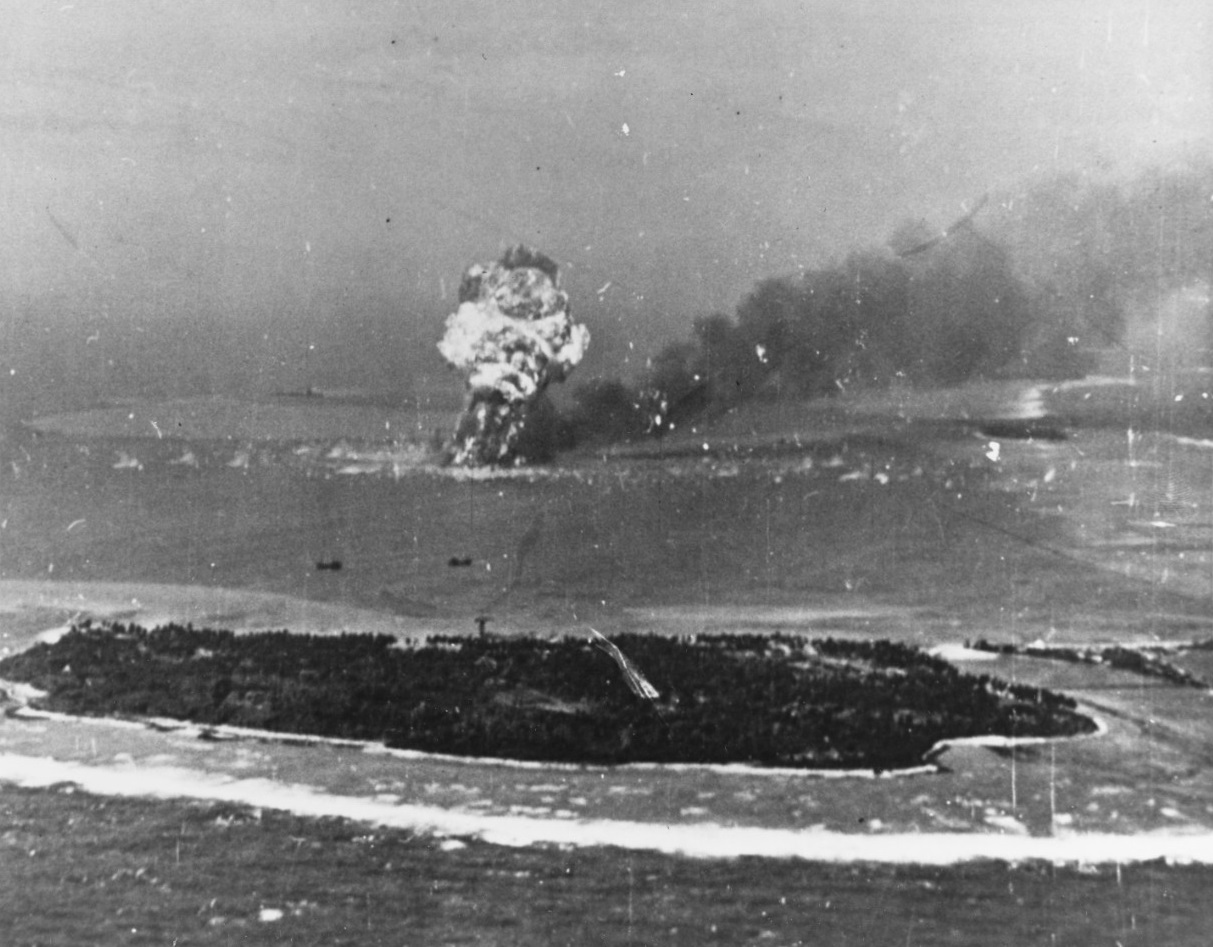
Battle in December 1943 at Kwajalein lagoon. A ship has exploded.

On February 1, 1942, the aircraft carrier USS Enterprise launched a series of raids on the Roi Namur airfield and merchant shipping in Carlos Pass, where they sank several ships. In Kwajalein, forced laborers from across the empire and Marshallese volunteers known as teishintai (挺身隊) built military facilities throughout the atoll. These construction teams would repair the resulting damage from American bombing raids. A second wave of Japanese naval and ground forces was dispatched to Kwajalein in early 1943 from the Manchurian front. These soldiers were between the ages of 18 and 21, poorly trained, and had no experience in the tropics. The supply ships that were meant to provide them with food rations were sunk by American forces before reaching the atoll; many Japanese succumbed to illnesses like dengue fever and dysentery, as did many of the laborers. As the military situation worsened and the pressures of military ideology increased, soldiers at Kwajalein became harsher and more violent toward Marshall Islanders, whom they often suspected of spying for the Americans. Kwajalein was also the site of a prisoner of war camp, whose detainees were not registered with the Red Cross. The island acquired the nickname "Execution Island" because of the treatment and killing of prisoners at the hands of Japanese military staff. The Japanese military also tested biological warfare agents on prisoners there.

After the war, a U.S. Naval War Crimes court located on the atoll tried several Japanese naval officers for war crimes committed elsewhere; at least one officer was condemned to death.

=== American occupation ===
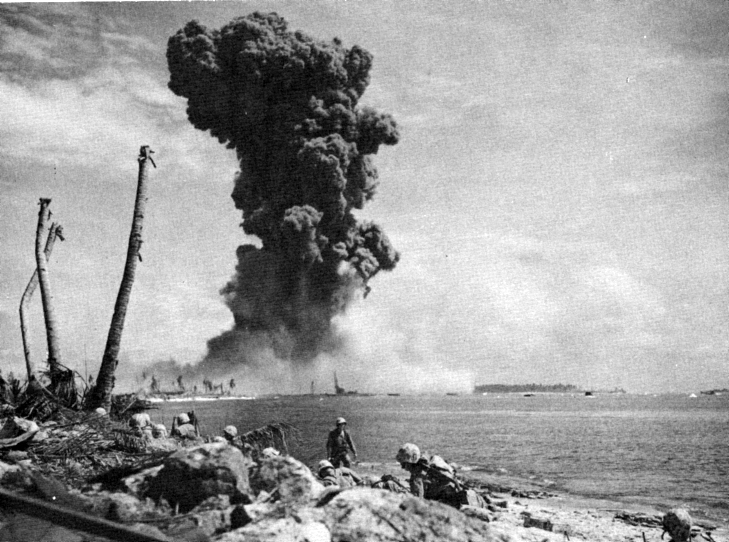
Explosion on Namur island, 1944

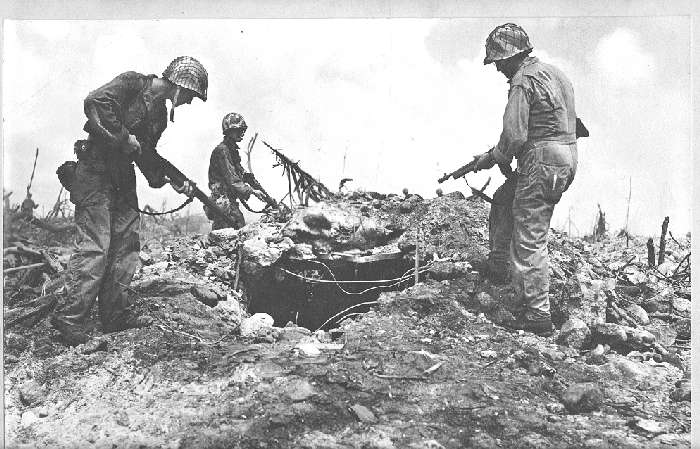
U.S. infantry inspect a bunker after capturing the Kwajalein Atoll from Japan during World War II.

On January 31, 1944, the 7th Infantry Division, spearheaded by the 111th Infantry Regiment performed an amphibious assault on Kwajalein. On February 1, 1944, Kwajalein was the target of the most concentrated bombardment of the Pacific War. An estimated 36,000 shells from naval ships and ground artillery on a nearby islet struck Kwajalein. B-24 Liberator bombers aerially bombarded the island, adding to the destruction.

Of the 8,782 Japanese personnel deployed to the atoll, including forced laborers, 7,870 were killed. U.S. military documents do not differentiate between the Japanese and Korean dead. However, the Korean government's Truth Commission for Forced Labor Under Japanese Imperialism reports an official figure from the Japanese government of 310 Koreans killed in the American invasion of Kwajalein. Whether this figure represents Kwajalein islet or the whole atoll is unclear. Since no distinction was made between dead Japanese soldiers and Korean forced laborers in mass graves on Kwajalein, both are enshrined as war hero guardian spirits for the Japanese nation in Yasukuni Shrine. This enshrinement is solely due to the mingling of Korean and Japanese corpses in this one case and has not occurred with the remains of other Korean forced laborers elsewhere.

Additionally, while many of the native Marshallese successfully fled the island in their canoes just before the battle, an estimated 200 were killed on the atoll during the fighting. Kwajalein was one of the few locations in the Pacific War where indigenous islanders were recorded to have been killed while fighting for the Japanese. Many Marshallese dead were found among those killed in bunkers. The flat island offered no other protection against the heavy bombardment. Taking refuge in bunkers resulted in many Marshallese deaths when their shelters were destroyed by hand grenades. Some Marshallese were reportedly induced to fight by Japanese propaganda which, as would occur later in the Battle of Okinawa, stated that the Americans would indiscriminately rape and massacre the civilian population if they successfully took the atoll.

On February 6, 1944, Kwajalein was claimed by the United States and was designated, with the rest of the Marshall Islands, as a United Nations Trust Territory under the United States.

=== Evolution into a U.S. military installation ===
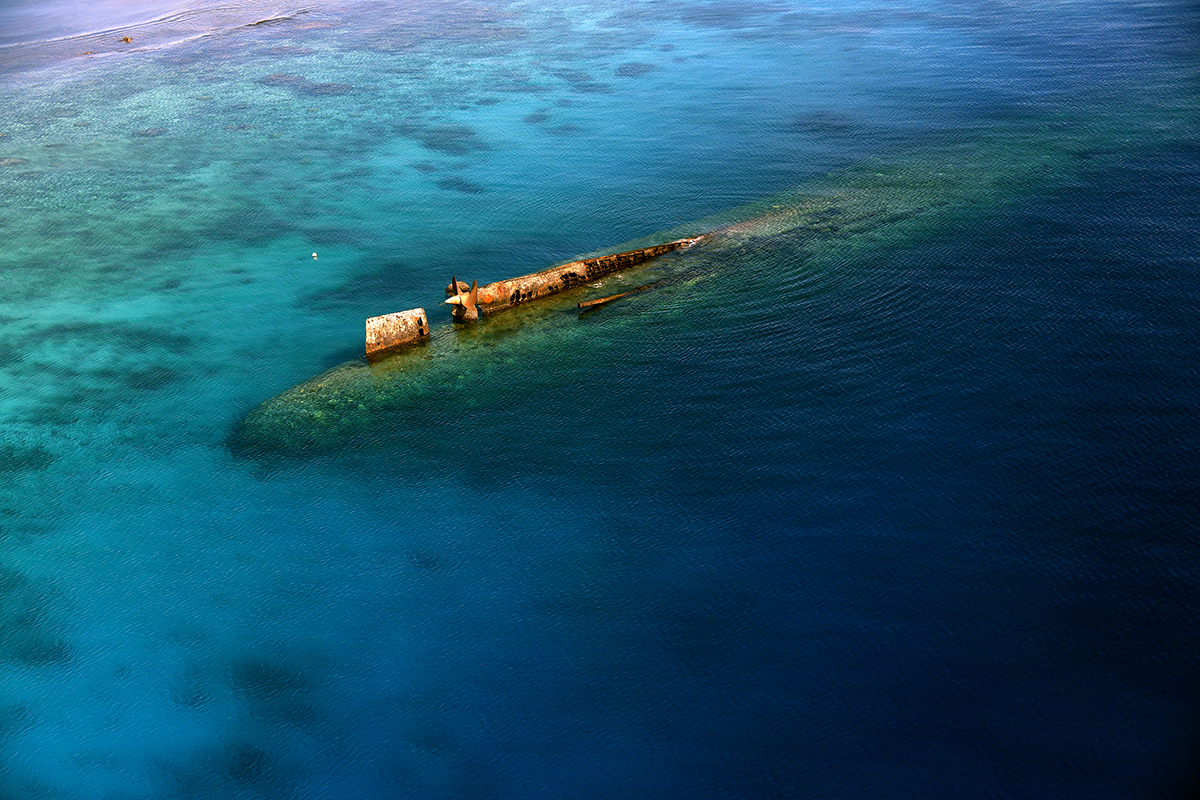
The sunken wreck of Prinz Eugen in the lagoon

In the years following, Kwajalein Atoll was converted into a staging area for campaigns in the advance on the Japanese homeland in the Pacific War. After the war ended, the United States used it as a main command center and preparation base in 1946 for Operation Crossroads, the first of several series of nuclear tests (comprising a total of 67 blasts) at the Marshall island atolls of Bikini and Enewetak. Significant portions of the native population were forced to relocate as a result of American weapons testing and military activity in the islands between 1945 and 1965. The German heavy cruiser Prinz Eugen was towed to Kwajalein from Bikini Atoll after the Operation Crossroads nuclear tests. It developed a leak, was towed out, and sank in the lagoon.

The battleship USS Pennsylvania was sunk in the ocean off Kwajalein Atoll after being exposed during atomic bomb testing on February 10, 1948.

By the 1950s, the Marshallese population working at the base at Kwajalein had grown. The conditions in the makeshift labor camp on Kwajalein islet were such that the U.S. Navy administering the atoll decided to relocate these Islanders to nearby Ebeye, an islet only three islands to the north of Kwajalein and accessible by a short boat ride or walk over the reef at low tide. Nuclear refugees from the atolls irradiated by the American tests were also moved to Ebeye.

With the end of the Cold War and a decreased threat of nuclear attack, many defense programs were canceled in the early 1990s. Continuing military operations and launch or re-entry tests perpetuate the dislocation of Marshall Islanders from their small islands throughout Kwajalein Atoll. The United States Army Kwajalein Atoll test site does not provide logistical support to Ebeye or Ennibur islets.

=== 21st century ===
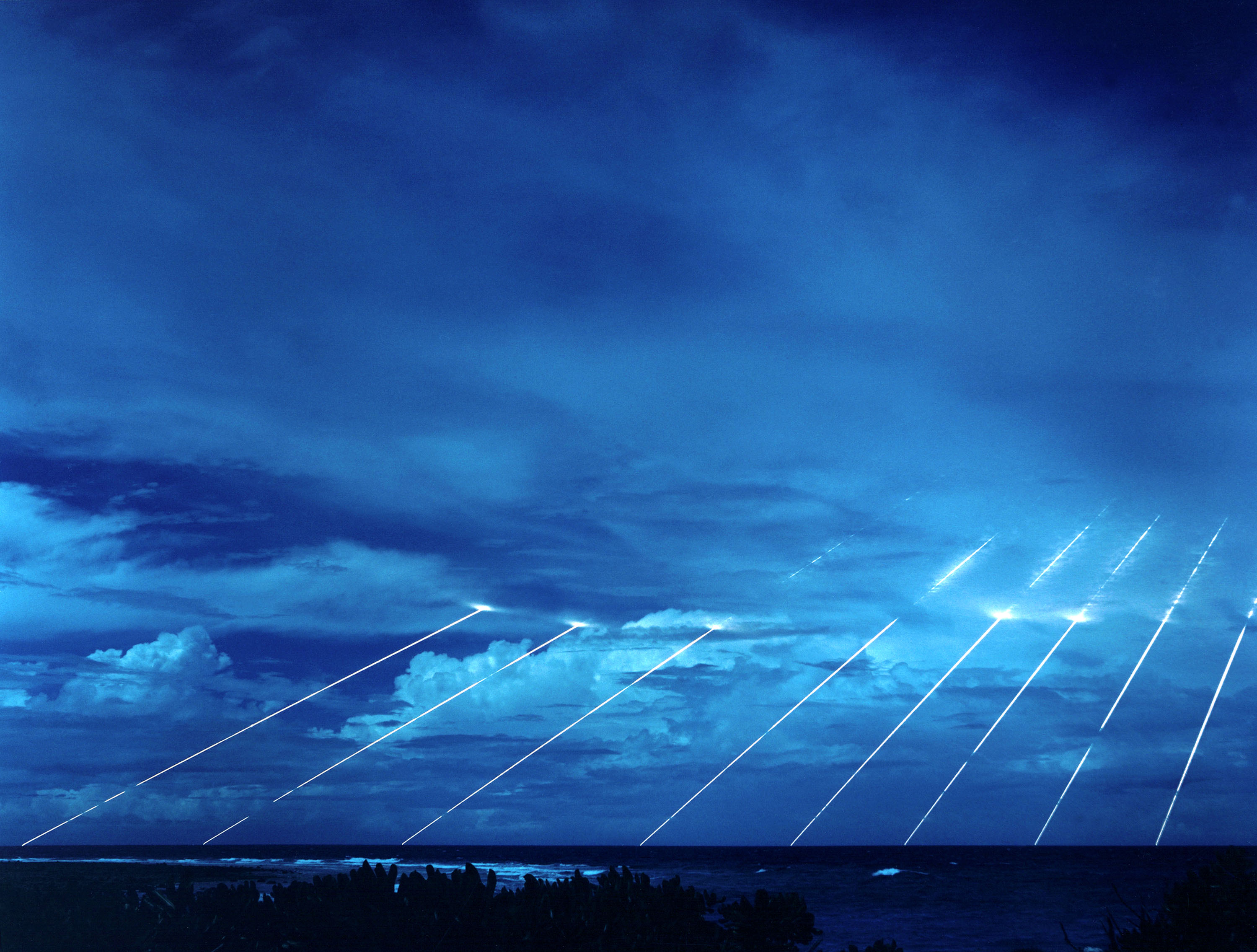
Ballistic missile testing at Kwajalein, 2004

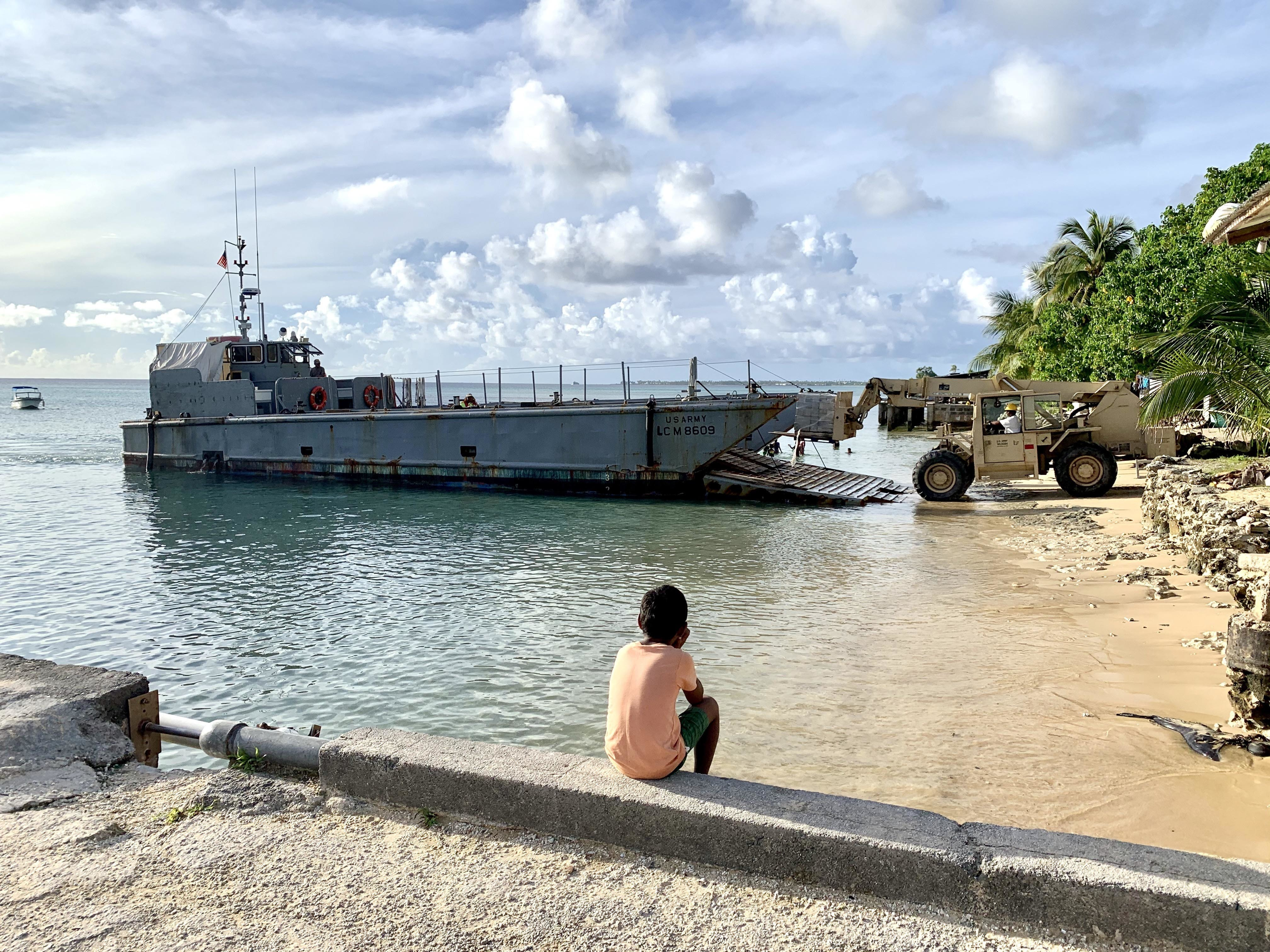
A Marshall Islander watches U.S. Navy Seabees offload materials and tools in 2019.

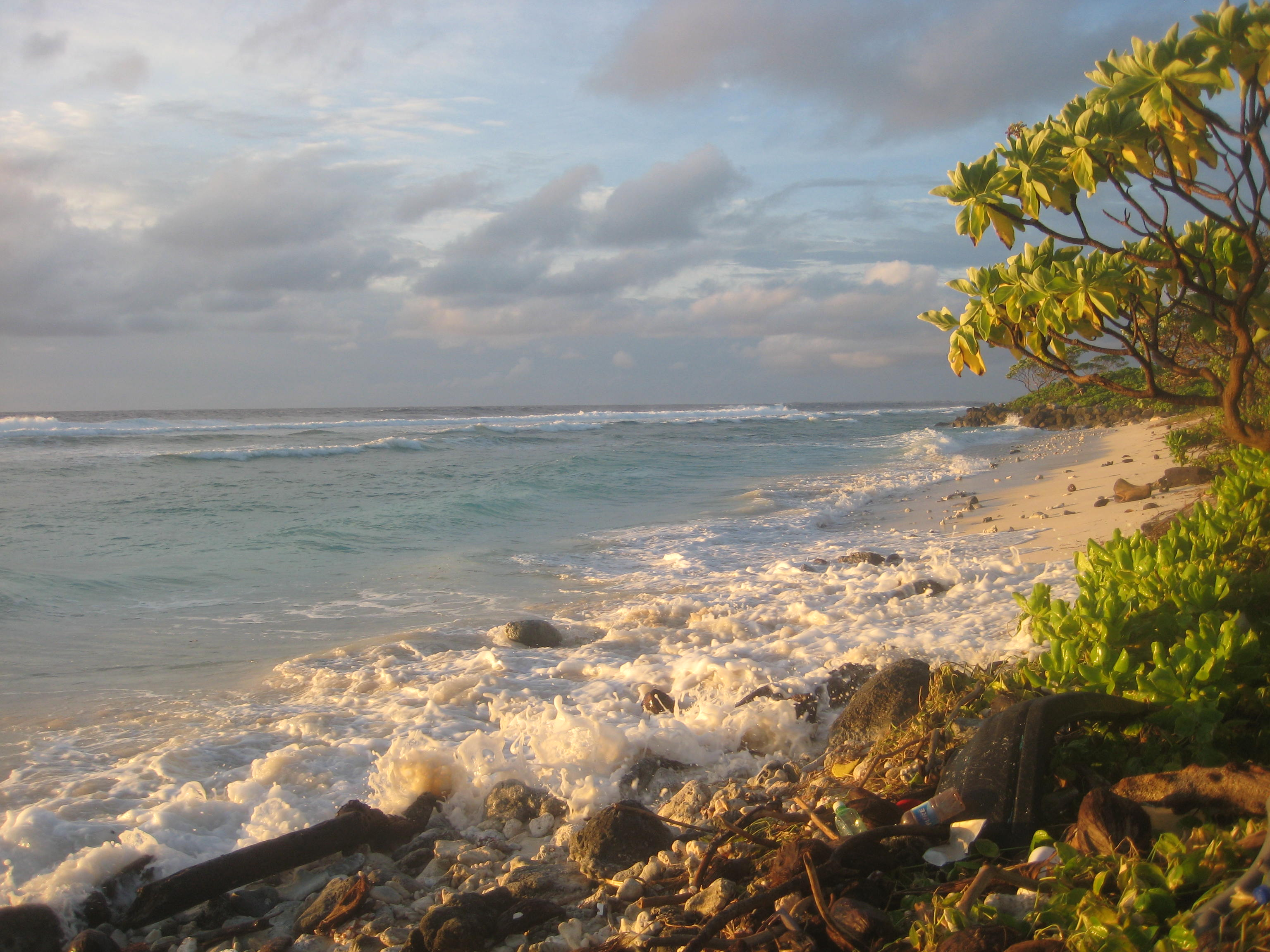
Ocean side view of Gugeegue

In 2008, a new coalition government was formed in part from the Aelon Kein Ad Party (formerly known as the Kabua Party), which represents Kwajalein landowners and is led by Paramount Chief Imata Kabua. This government is negotiating a new Kwajalein Atoll Land Use Agreement with the United States.

With the election of Barack Obama to the presidency of the United States, the new administration of the Marshall Islands, and the looming deadline for signing the Land Use Agreement (LUA), at the end of 2008, President Litokwa Tomeing wrote a letter to George W. Bush asking that the deadline for the LUA be lifted. Within a day of the expiration of this LUA deadline, the United States agreed to shift this deadline back another five years. But it reiterated its stance that the Compact renegotiation was already completed and that it expected the Republic of the Marshall Islands to abide by the Military Use and Operating Rights Agreement (MUORA) it agreed to in 2003. Government leaders and landowners were hopeful that this extension will allow for more money to be paid to the land owners.

The U.S. Army Garrison Kwajalein Atoll (USAG-KA) installation has been downsizing, in part because of budget constraints and technological improvements (such as a new trans-oceanic fiber-optic cable) that will allow the testing range to be operated extensively from sites in the United States, thus minimizing operation costs and the need for on-site workers or residents. Recently, the American population of the Kwajalein installation has dropped dramatically. The aluminum-sided trailers that housed the bulk of the contractor population are systematically being removed from the main island. Nevertheless, the enormous investment in these new technologies and recent statements by Army leadership indicate that the United States is committed to remaining in the Marshall Islands at Kwajalein Atoll for the foreseeable future.

In 2009, American ambassador Clyde Bishop commented that future funding to the Republic of the Marshall Islands was dependent on the use of Kwajalein.

Kwajalein Atoll has been leased by the United States for missile testing and other operations from well before independence for the Marshall Islands. Although this military history has influenced the lives of the Marshall Islanders who have lived in the atoll through the war to the present, the military history of Kwajalein has prevented tourism.

SpaceX updated facilities on Omelek Island to launch its commercial Falcon 1 rockets. The first successful Falcon 1 orbital space launch from Omelek was conducted in 2008. It could launch Falcon 9 rockets into polar and geosynchronous orbit. Due to a disagreement about building a new launch pad on Omelek, between either the U.S. military or the RMI, SpaceX moved their main facilities to the U.S. and no longer uses the facilities in the atoll.

Since 2000, Kwajalein has become one of five preferred locations from which Pegasus rockets can be launched into equatorial orbit.

== Demographics ==
9,789 people lived on the atoll at the 2021 census, mostly on densely populated Ebeye Island, which is the second most populated island in the Marshall Islands. Many other islands have small populations around the atoll including near Roi-Namur and the western islands. Ebeye is linked by causeway to four other islands, and the southern area with the military base to the south is one of the larger population centers in the Western Side of the Marshall Islands.

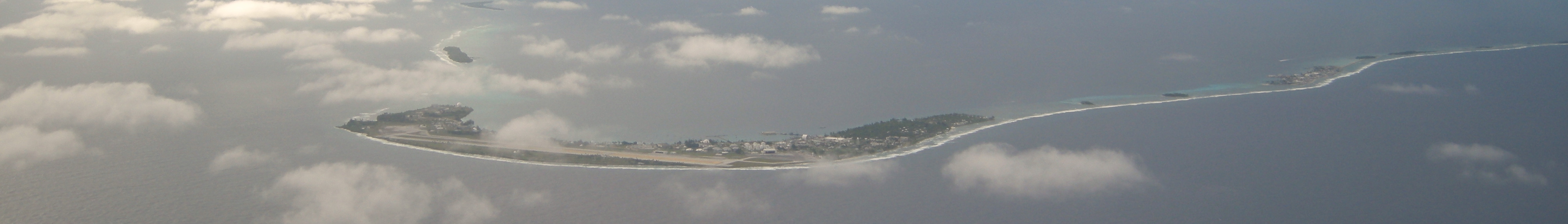
The southern end of Kwajalein Atoll is an important area with the main military base and airport on the left, and to the right the island city of Ebeye, the most populated island of the Western ("sunset"/Ralik) of the Marshall Islands.

== Current use by U.S. military ==
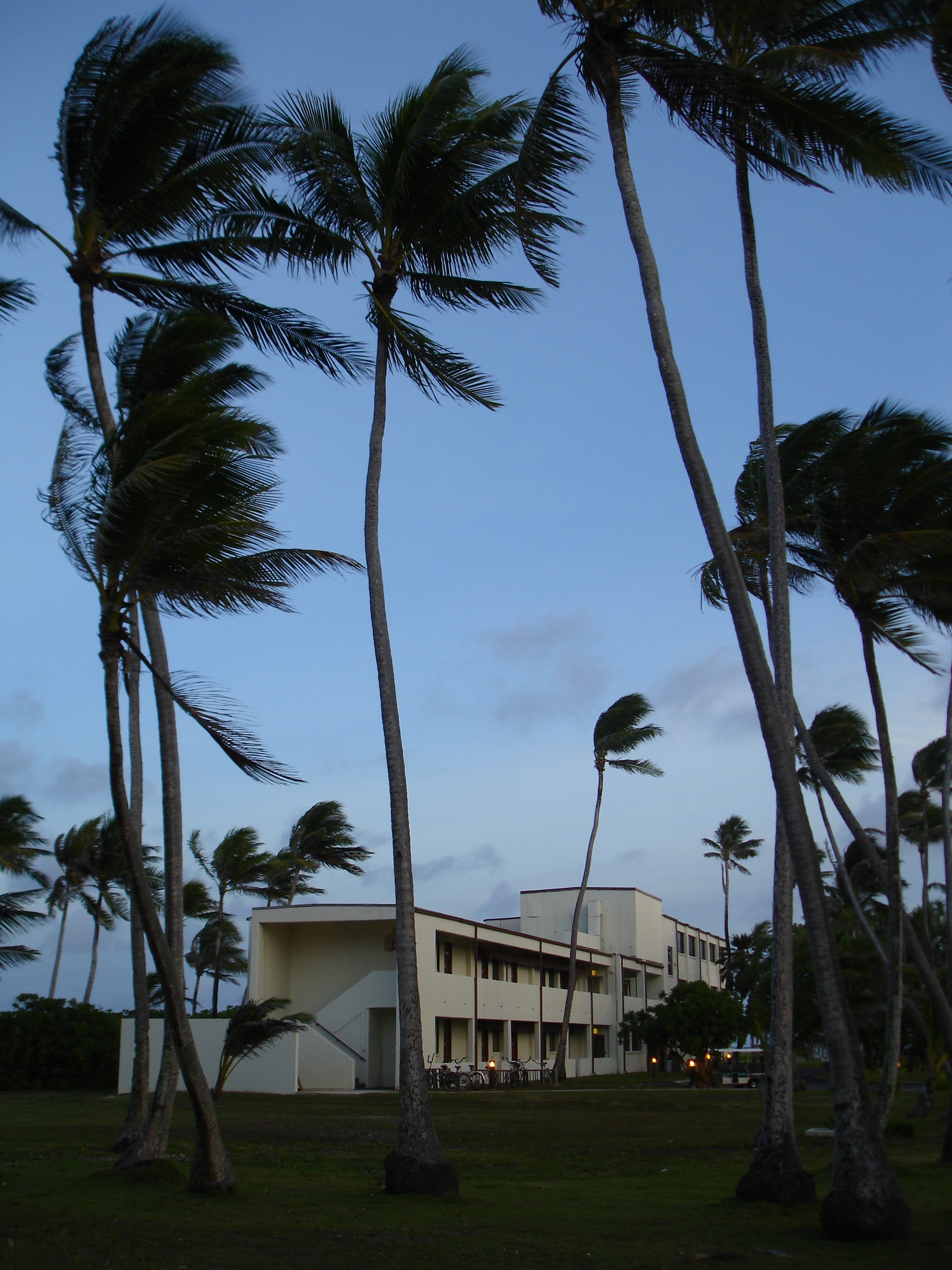
Short-term accommodations at the "Kwaj Lodge" showing typical Kwajalein housing construction

Kwajalein and Roi-Namur are the main islands used by the U.S. personnel. Provision is made for family housing. Personnel whose family members are not with them live in hotel room style housing.

=== Testing sites ===
Of the 97 islands, 11 are leased by the United States. They are part of the Ronald Reagan Ballistic Missile Defense Test Site (RTS), formerly known as Kwajalein Missile Range. The lease is active from 2006 to 2066, with an option to renew for another 20 years. Leased islands include Kwajalein, Meck, Eniwetak, Omelek, Gellinam, Gagan, Ennugarret, and Roi-Namur on the eastern side of the atoll and Ennylabegan, Legan, and Illeginni on the western side.

RTS includes radar installations, optics, telemetry, and communications equipment, which are used for ballistic missile and missile-interceptor testing, and for space operations support. Kwajalein island hosts the $914 million Space Fence radar, which tracks satellites and orbital debris. Kwajalein has one of five ground stations used in controlling the RTS range, which also assist in the operation of the Global Positioning System (GPS) navigation system. (Note: The other ground stations are at Diego Garcia, Ascension Island, Hawaii, and Colorado Springs.)

== Wartime memorials ==
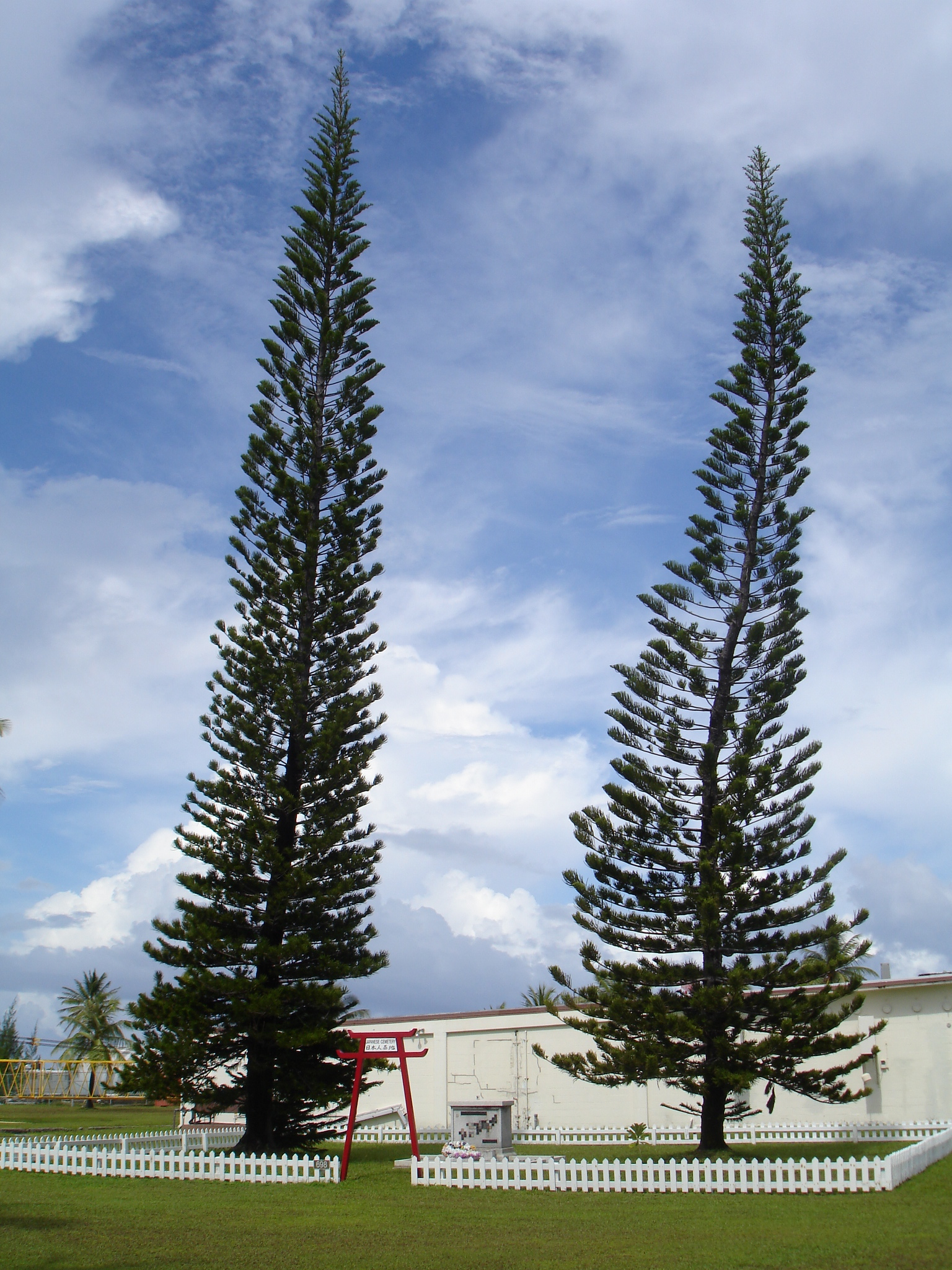
Site of the "Japanese Cemetery" on Kwajalein built as a memorial to war dead on the atoll

Very few Japanese or Korean remains were ever repatriated from the atoll; thus both Kwajalein and Roi-Namur have ceremonial cenotaphs to honor this memory. The memorial on Kwajalein was constructed by the Japan Marshall Islands War-Bereaved Families Association in the 1960s, and the memorial on Roi-Namur was constructed by American personnel. The memorial sites are dedicated to Japanese souls and to the sacrifices of Koreans, Marshallese, and Americans. U.S. Marine Corps intelligence records and photographs at the U.S. National Archives, together with the testimony of U.S. veterans, indicate that there was a mass-burial site consolidated into one place on Kwajalein islet, at or near the current cemetery. However, remains are scattered throughout the islet, at Roi-Namur, and in places throughout the atoll. Bereaved Japanese and Korean families have mixed sentiments about whether or not to return these remains to their home countries, as none of them are identifiable, and "bone-collecting" missions are sometimes perceived by families as an insult to the dead or a political stunt by the Japanese government.

Japanese bereaved family members consider the sites of sunken Japanese shipwrecks in Kwajalein lagoon to be sacred gravesites. They object to the activities of American divers who attempt to explore these wrecks.

A ceremony is held at Japan's Yasukuni Shrine annually in April (originally held in February to coincide with the anniversary of the battle), where the memories of the Japanese soldiers are honored and surviving families offer prayers to their spirits. Small groups of bereaved Japanese families have made pilgrimages to Kwajalein on a semi-annual basis since the 1990s. The first of these groups was the Japan Marshall Islands War-Bereaved Families Association, which negotiated its visit with the U.S. Army as far back as 1964 and made its first visit in 1975 at the invitation of the Kwajalein Missile Range. The bereaved families of conscripted Korean laborers have also recently traveled in groups to the Marshall Islands and other parts of Micronesia, the Philippines, and Indonesia, with funding from the Japanese government, although they have not yet paid a group visit to Kwajalein.

The United States designated most of the island of Kwajalein and all of Roi-Namur as National Historic Landmarks in 1985, in recognition of the role those places played during World War II. The Kwajalein designation includes only the historical 1944 shape of the island, which has been enlarged since then by dredging and fill.

== Kwajalein Island ==
=== History ===
There was a private flying club from 1963 through the mid-1980s. They owned two aircraft, tied down outdoors off the Bucholtz airstrip. Because they used avgas, they were forced to discontinue operations when the Army switched to turbine-powered aircraft and no longer stocked avgas.

=== Recreation ===
The Adult Pool on Kwajalein is drained and re-filled once a week with salt water from the ocean.

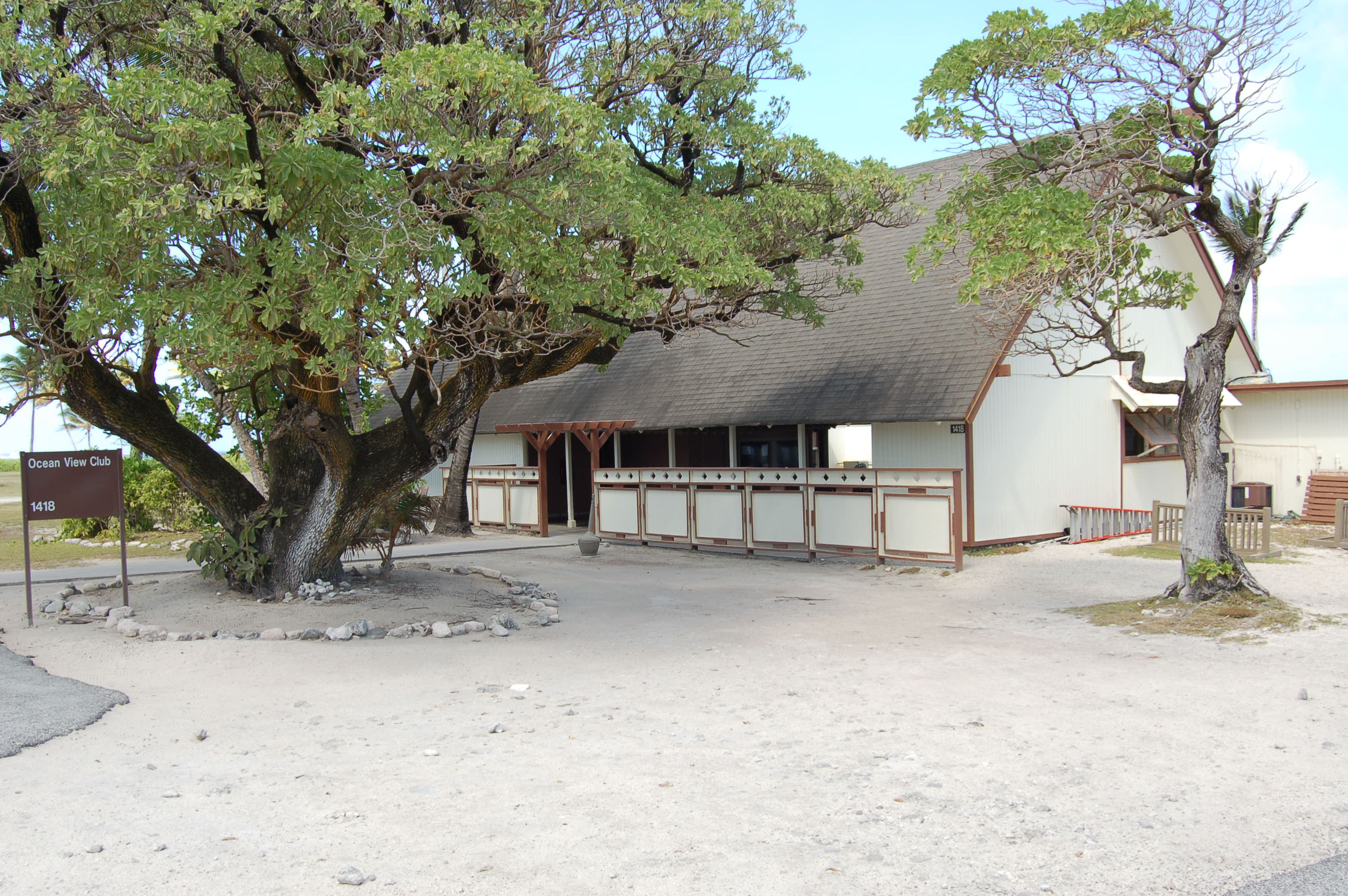
The Ocean View Club, an open-air lounge on the ocean side of Kwajalein

Kwajalein Island has several recreational accommodations, including two saltwater pools, multiple tennis courts, racquetball courts and basketball courts as well as playing fields for baseball, soccer, and other sports. The Corlett Recreational Center (CRC) is on the northeast side of the island and features several rooms for use by inhabitants as well as a full-size, indoor court where community and youth basketball, volleyball and indoor soccer can be played. The island features a nine-hole golf course near the airport, a bowling alley, libraries, a fitness center and two movie theaters. Inhabitants can rent boats for water skiing and fishing at the Kwajalein marina. Residents spear fish, deep-sea fish and scuba dive.

=== Economy ===
On Kwajalein Island, housing is free for most personnel, depending on contract or tour of duty.

== Land leases ==
Under the constitution of the Republic of the Marshall Islands the government can own land only in limited circumstances. Practically, all land is private and inherited through one's matriline and clan. Since the United States began leasing land, the issue of proper land payments has been a major issue of contention for landowners which continues today. "Landowners" here refers to the consortium of irooj (chiefs), alaps (clan heads) and rijerbal (workers) who have land rights to the places used for military purposes by the United States. In the case of Kwajalein Atoll in particular, a "senior rijerbal" is assigned a role to represent families who have claims to land as "workers" of that location.

Unclear and insufficient in the opinion of these landowners, the original lease arrangements for Kwajalein Atoll with the U.S. were finally negotiated only after the landowners and their supporters demonstrated in the early 1980s with a peaceful protest called "Operation Homecoming," in which Islanders re-inhabited their land at Kwajalein, Roi-Namur, and other restricted sites. Although Operation Homecoming did not achieve the level of recognition for all people with land title at Kwajalein, the resulting agreements at least set a precedent for future dealings with the United States government.

One of these early agreements was the first official Military Use and Operating Rights Agreement (MUORA) between the United States Army and Government of the RMI, which was linked to the Status of Forces Agreement (SOFA) that was written into the larger Compact of Free Association with the United States. Article 3 of the MUORA obligated the RMI to lease specific sites from their owners through a Land Use Agreement (LUA) and then sub-lease them to the United States. Effectively, this rendered the land negotiations for use of Kwajalein Atoll a "domestic issue" between the national Marshallese government in Majuro and local "landowners," even though Kwajalein, where the local Marshallese population deals on a daily basis with American military activity, is a considerable distance from Majuro. Many Kwajalein Atoll residents have complained in the past that Majuro is out of touch with the realities of Kwajalein Marshallese, and downplays their suffering while profiting from the income provided by the testing site.

The first MUORA guaranteed total payments of roughly US$11 million to the landowners through the year 2016, the majority of which went, via the provisions of the LUA to the irooj (chiefs), who had the largest stake in the land.

In advance of its expiration in 2016, this LUA was renegotiated in 2003 as part of the Compact of Free Association, with the U.S. agreeing to pay the landowners (by the Republic of the Marshall Islands) $15 million a year, adjusted for inflation. In exchange for these payments, the Compact stipulated a new MUORA that gave the U.S. the option to use Kwajalein through 2066, renewable through 2086. The landowners, affiliated under the Kwajalein Negotiations Committee (KNC), were very unhappy with the proposed LUA, since they believed they should have been receiving at least double that amount in funds and that, more importantly, the LUA did nothing to provide for Marshall Islanders' welfare, health care, safety, and rapidly increasing population on Ebeye. By their independent land appraisals and calculations, the KNC had determined that the minimum acceptable compensation they should receive for Kwajalein lands was at least $19.1 million annually, adjusted for inflation. The landowners also claimed that there were many other terms by which they wished the U.S. would abide should the lease be extended, including providing better support and infrastructure to Ebeye, improving health care and education, guaranteeing that the missile testing was not creating environmental hazards, and providing a comprehensive life and property insurance policy. Despite a consensus among the landowners to refuse to allow the Compact to be signed with this inadequate LUA proposed by the U.S., the new Compact (and the MUORA, by extension) was finalized by officials of the RMI national government and went into effect in 2003.

Stating that they had not been consulted about this agreement, the landowners went on to protest it, and mounted an organized boycott of the new LUA. Although the new Compact and its component MUORA was ratified in 2003, they have since held out and refused to sign the LUA of 2003, insisting, through Kwajalein Atoll elected representatives, that either a new LUA should be drafted that considers their needs or the U.S. will have to leave Kwajalein when the active LUA (which began in the 1980s) expires in 2016.

The U.S., however, considers the Compact to be an "internationally binding" agreement that has been concluded. It thus pays an annual $15 million to the landowners, as agreed provisionally in the MUORA laid out in the 2003 Compact renegotiation; however, as this new LUA has not been signed, the difference of roughly $4 million has been going into an escrow account. The Compact stated that if the Republic of the Marshall Islands and the landowners did not reach an agreement about land payments by the end of 2008, these funds in escrow would be returned to the U.S. Treasury. Referring to this incentive to reach an agreement, then-Senator Tony deBrum stated that it would be "insane" for the Marshallese people to put up with another 70 years of lack of access.

In 2011, during the term in office of Jurelang Zedkaia, a statement was issue by the Office of the President in Majuro that a long-term LUA had been signed. Under the terms of the agreement, the United States was granted access until 2066, with an option to extend to 2086. A sum of over $32M held in the escrow account was then made available to the Kwajalein landholders. The landholders' spokesman, Christopher Loeak, referred to the agreement as "a compromise which we’ve agreed upon to safeguard our future."

== Infrastructure ==
=== Roads ===
On Kwajalein Island the primary mode of personal transportation is the bicycle.

=== Airports ===
There are two airbases and three airstrips on Kwajalein Atoll:

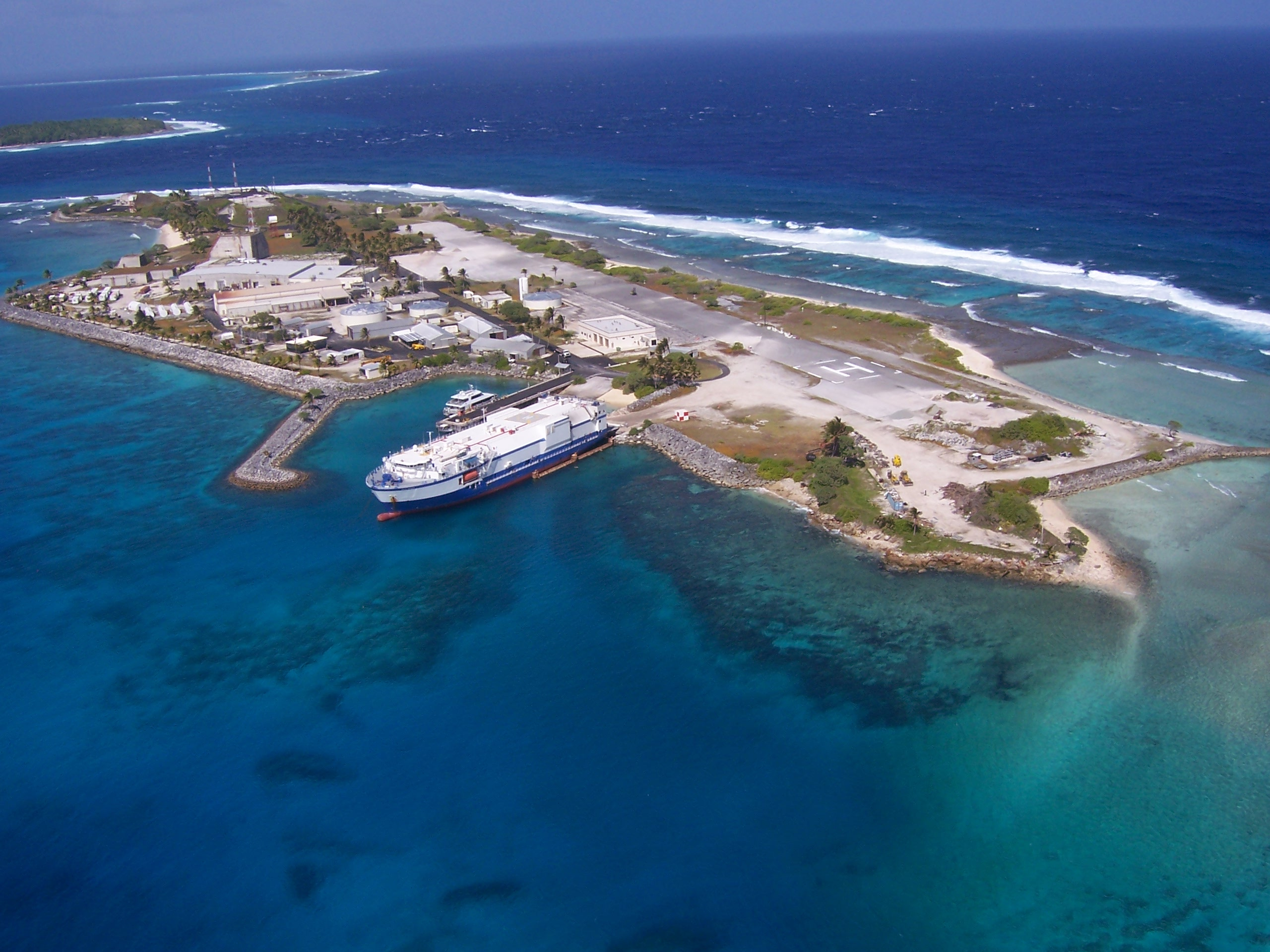
Aerial view of Meck Island

- Bucholz Army Airfield (IATA: KWA, ICAO: PKWA, FAA LID: KWA) to the south at Kwajalein: 08°43′12″N 167°43′54″E
- Dyess Army Airfield (ICAO: PKRO, FAA LID: ROI) to the north at Roi-Namur: 09°23′49″N 167°28′15″E
- Ebadon Airstrip (IATA: EBN) to the west at Ebadon: 09°19′50″N 166°49′09″E
- Elenak Airport (IATA: EAL) on Mejato: 09°19′09″N 166°50′54″E
- Meck Island Airstrip, an eastern island, between Roi-Namur and Kwajalein: 09°00′00″N 167°43′38″E

=== Water ===
Water is collected or generated on Kwajalein Island and distributed by barge to Meck, Illeginni, and Gugeegue. Kwaj collects rainfall from the runway into a catch basin where it is stored and treated. A secondary source is from "skim wells" on Kwaj and Roi-Namur. Rain percolates through the coral during the wet season. The third method is the evaporation of sea water. There are three steam evaporators on Kwaj. While the theoretical potential is 400,000 US gallons (1,500,000 L; 330,000 imp gal) daily, the practical limit is 250,000 US gallons (950,000 L; 210,000 imp gal) daily. This distillation is expensive and avoided, if possible.

Untreated water is filtered to remove 99% of the bacteria. It is then treated with 4–5 parts of chlorine per million and 0.7 parts per million of fluorine.

Sea water is used for sewage lines. The seawater sewage treatment used for flushing latrine system was abandoned and pumping systems rehabilitated in 1980 (Global Logistics 1980) and an activated sludge treatment plant was built on the Western area near Fuel Pier. The wastewater treatment plant is a tertiary treatment plant that provides reclaimed water for non potable usage such as toilets, industrial uses, and the island's irrigation system.

== Education ==
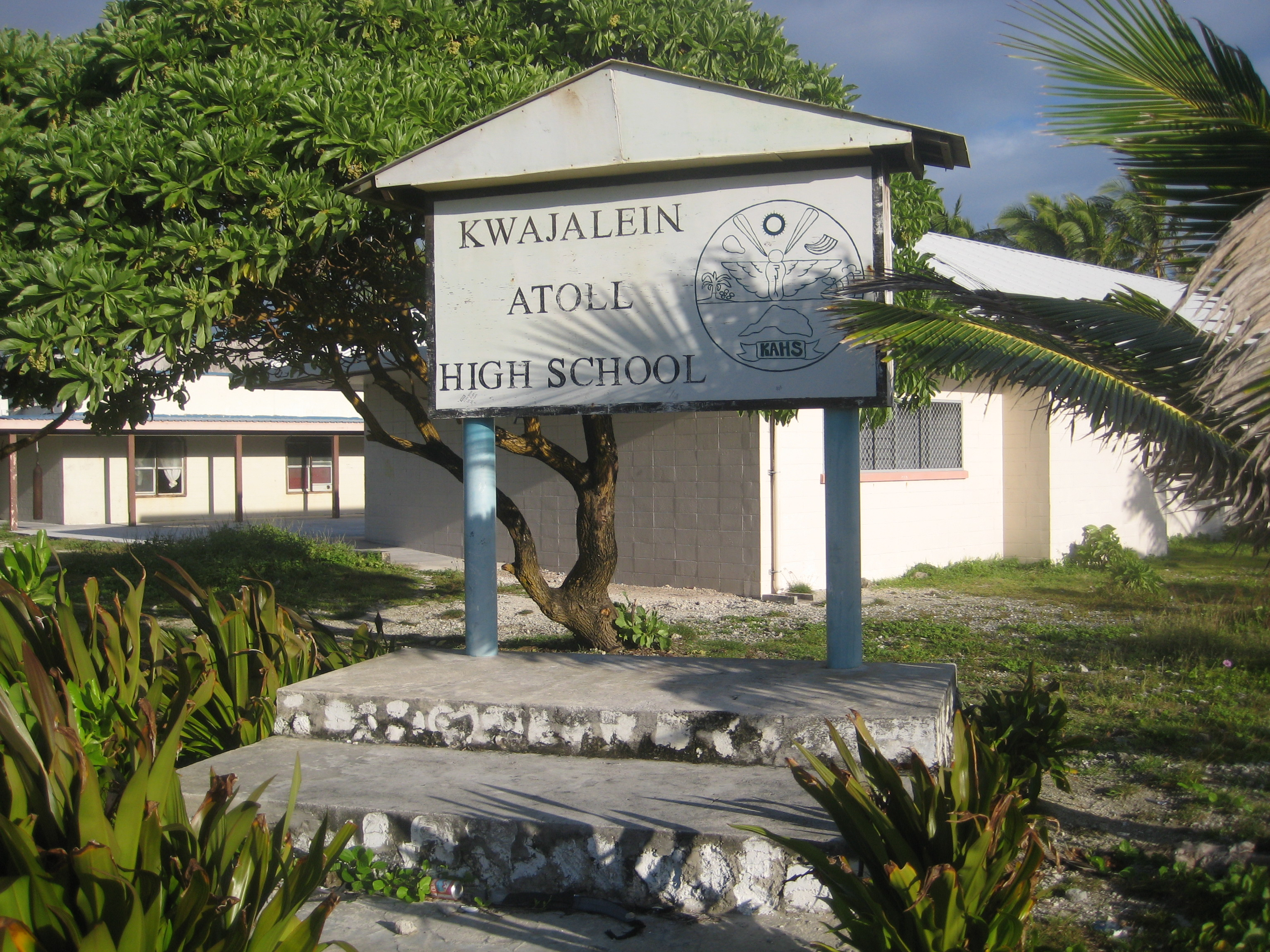
Kwajalein Atoll High School

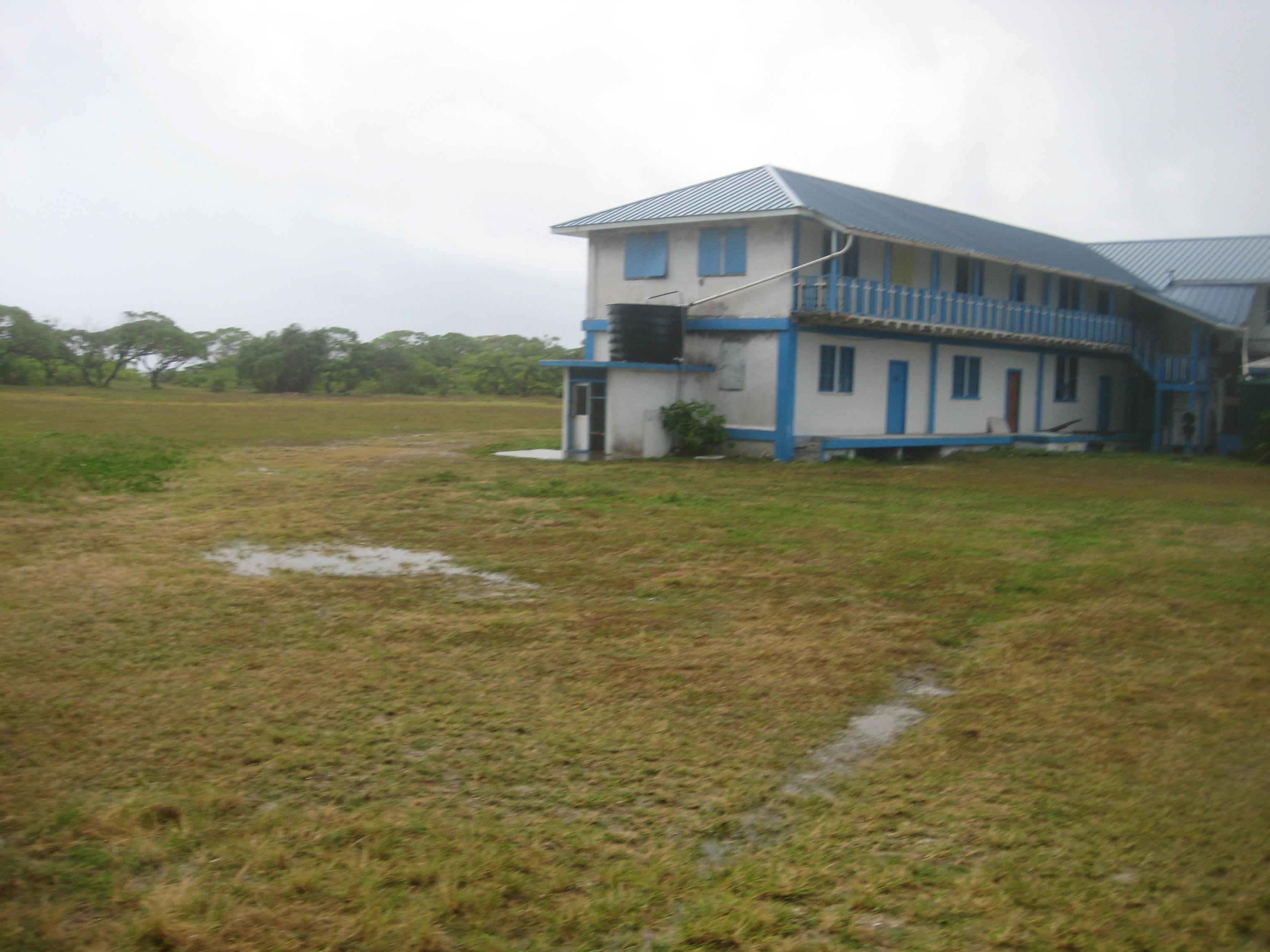
School on Gugeegue Island; note rain catchment system from roof

Marshall Islands Public School System operates public schools for local Marshallese.

High schools:

- Kwajalein Atoll High School (KAHS)

Primary schools:

- Carlos Elementary School
- Ebadon Elementary School
- Ebeye Kindergarten
- Ebeye Public Elementary School
- Ebeye Public Middle School
- Eniburr Elementary School
- Mejatto Elementary School on Mejatto serves Ronglap people

In the 1994–1995 school year Kwajalein had three private high schools.

AVID (formerly DynCorp International) operates two schools for dependents of U.S. military and civilian employees, George Seitz Elementary School (K-6) and Kwajalein Jr./Sr. High School (7–12).

== Twin towns ==
Kwajalein is twinned with:

- Taichung City, Taiwan, since 2002

== Popular culture ==
The atoll is the setting of a clandestine spacecraft launch site in Neal Shusterman's third novel in his Arc of a Scythe series, The Toll.

== Notable people ==
- Lisa Loring, American actress who played Wednesday Addams on the sitcom The Addams Family, was born here.
- Todd Lyght, American former football player for the Los Angeles/St. Louis Rams and the Detroit Lions, was born here.
- Joe Swanberg, American filmmaker, was partially raised here.
