= Gugeegue =

Islet of Kwajalein atoll, Marshall islands

Coordinates: 8°50′56″N 167°44′36″E

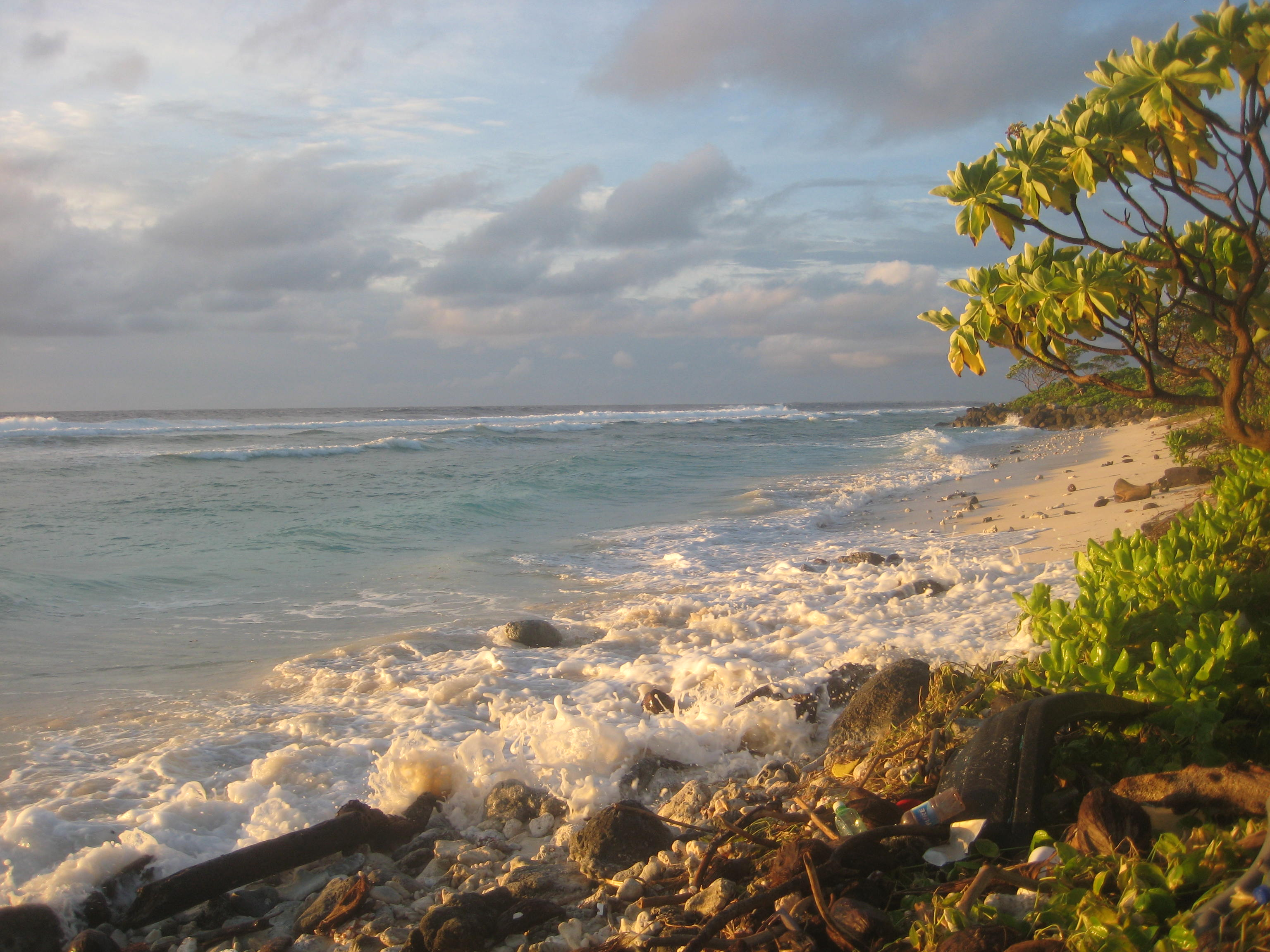
Oceanside on Gugeegue

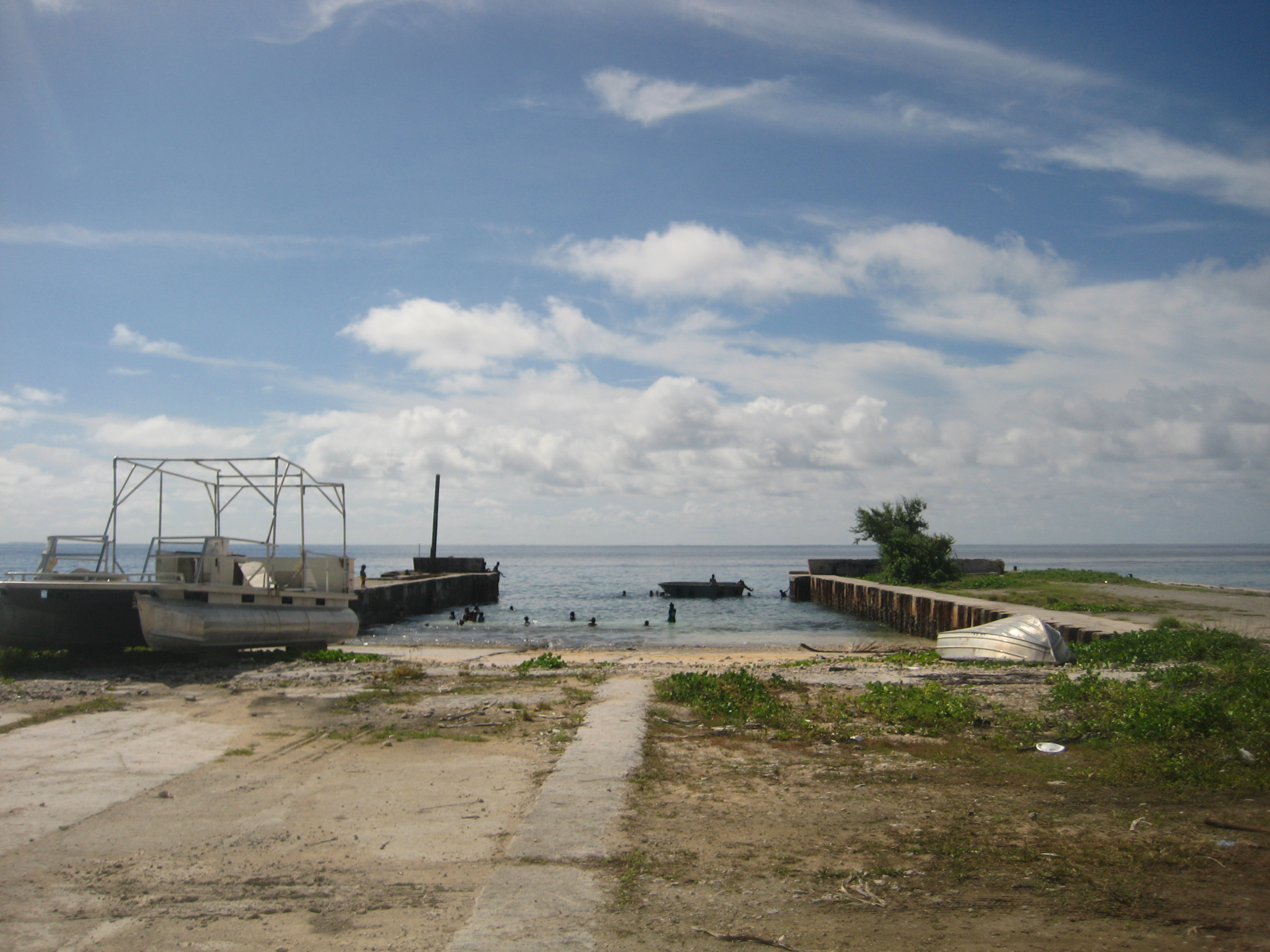
Gugeegue's pier and dock area

Guegeegue Island is an island located in the Kwajalein Atoll of the Republic of the Marshall Islands. It is connected by causeway to Ebeye Island, the second most populated island in the nation, and is the northernmost island so connected.

The island is also known as Gugegwe (/ˈɡuːdʒiɡuː/ GOO-jee-goo; Marshallese: Kōn̄e-jekāān-eņ, [kɤŋeːzʲɛɡæːnʲɛːnˠ]).

Gugeegue is just south of the Bigej Pass, which separates it from Bigej islet.

== Map ==
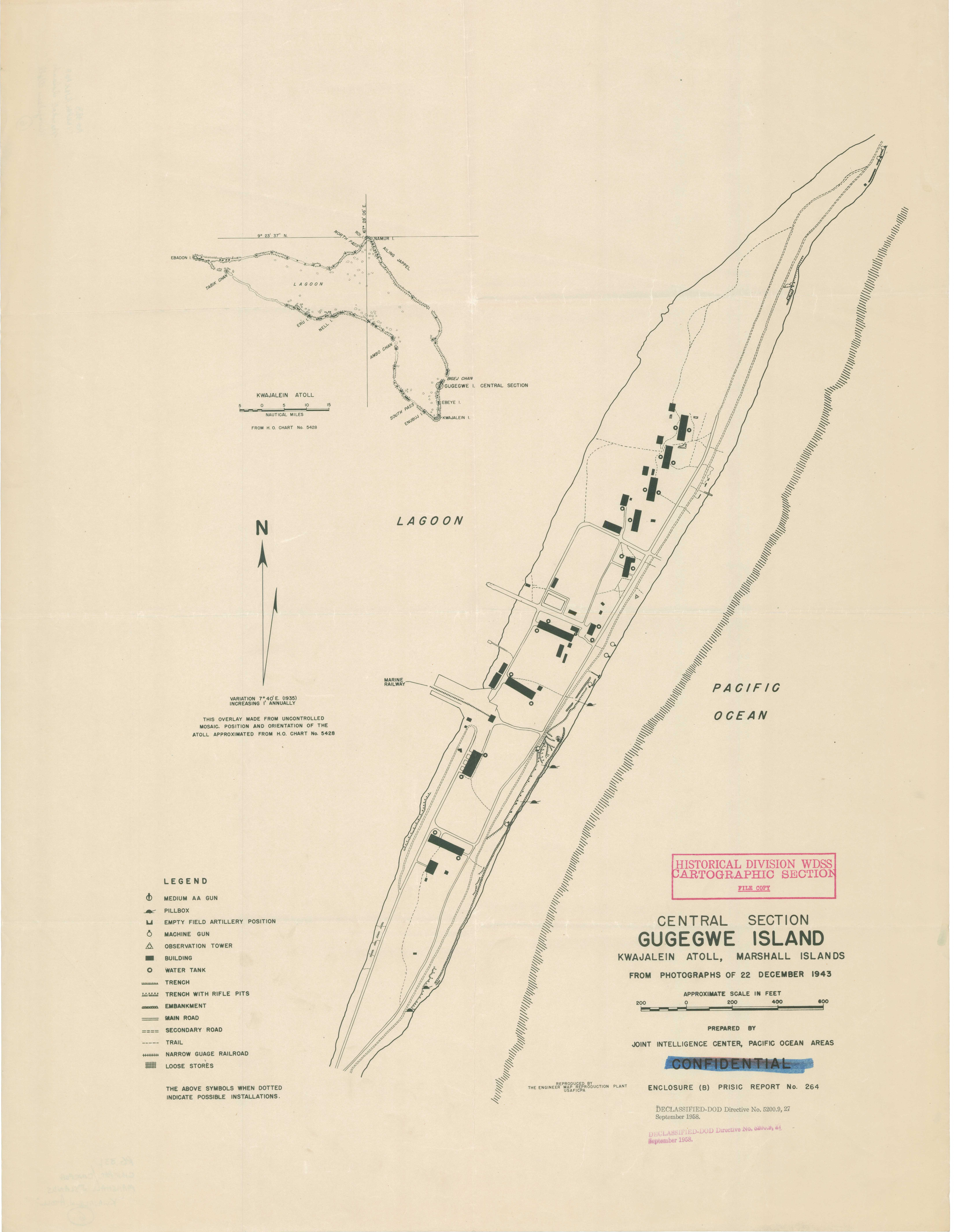
1943 map of Central Gugegwe. Today a causeway links it to islands to the south
