= List of ambassadors of the United States to the Marshall Islands =

Ambassador of the United States to the Marshall Islands
- Seal of the United States Department of State

- Flag of a United States ambassador

- Incumbent; Gregory D'Alesandro; Chargé d'affaires since January 13, 2026
- Nominator: The president of the United States
- Appointer: The president; with Senate advice and consent
- Inaugural holder: Samuel B. Thomsen as Representative
- Formation: October 21, 1986
- Website: U.S. Embassy - Majuro

This is a list of the ambassadors of the United States to the Marshall Islands. The Office of the U.S. Representative was opened at Majuro on October 21, 1986. It was upgraded to an embassy on September 6, 1989.

== Ambassadors ==
- Samuel B. Thomsen – Career FSO
  - State of Residency: California
  - Title: Representative
  - Appointment: June 15, 1987
  - Presentation of Credentials: July 11, 1987
  - Termination of Mission: Left post, July 11, 1990
- William Bodde, Jr. – Career FSO
  - State of Residency: Maryland
  - Title: Ambassador Extraordinary and Plenipotentiary
  - Appointment: June 27, 1990
  - Presentation of Credentials: August 6, 1990
  - Termination of Mission: Left post, June 28, 1992
- David C. Fields – Career FSO
  - State of Residency: California
  - Title: Ambassador Extraordinary and Plenipotentiary
  - Appointment: July 7, 1992
  - Presentation of Credentials: August 19, 1992
  - Termination of Mission: Left post, May 15, 1995
- Joan M. Plaisted – Career FSO
  - State of Residency: California
  - Title: Ambassador Extraordinary and Plenipotentiary
  - Appointment: December 19, 1995
  - Presentation of Credentials: February 9, 1996
  - Termination of Mission: Left post July 28, 2000
  - Note: Also accredited to Kiribati; resident at Majuro.
- Michael J. Senko – Career FSO
  - State of Residency: District of Columbia
  - Title: Ambassador Extraordinary and Plenipotentiary
  - Appointment: December 28, 2000
  - Presentation of Credentials: January 26, 2001
  - Termination of Mission: Left post August 2, 2003
  - Note: Also accredited to Kiribati; resident at Majuro.
- Greta N. Morris – Career FSO
  - State of Residency: California
  - Title: Ambassador Extraordinary and Plenipotentiary
  - Appointment: July 1, 2003
  - Presentation of Credentials: August 26, 2003
  - Termination of Mission: Left post, August 2, 2006
- Clyde Bishop – Career FSO
  - State of Residency: Delaware
  - Title: Ambassador Extraordinary and Plenipotentiary
  - Appointment: July 18, 2006
  - Presentation of Credentials: December 7, 2006
  - Termination of Mission: January 20, 2009
- Martha Campbell – Career FSO
  - State of Residency: Michigan
  - Title: Ambassador Extraordinary and Plenipotentiary
  - Appointment: August 21, 2009
  - Presentation of Credentials: September 7, 2009
  - Termination of Mission: July 11, 2012
- Thomas Hart Armbruster - Career FSO
  - State of Residency: New York
  - Title: Ambassador Extraordinary and Plenipotentiary
  - Appointment: August 2, 2012
  - Presentation of Credentials: September 6, 2012
  - Termination of Mission: May 25, 2016
- Karen B. Stewart - Career FSO
  - State of Residency: Florida
  - Title: Ambassador Extraordinary and Plenipotentiary
  - Appointment: June 6, 2016
  - Presentation of Credentials: July 25, 2016
  - Termination of Mission: January 27, 2020
- Roxanne Cabral
  - State of Residency: Virginia
  - Title: Ambassador Extraordinary and Plenipotentiary
  - Appointment: December 31, 2019
  - Presentation of Credentials: February 6, 2020
  - Termination of Mission: March 3, 2023
- Laura Stone
  - State of Residency: Washington D.C.
  - Title: Ambassador Extraordinary and Plenipotentiary
  - Appointment: May 2, 2024
  - Presentation of Credentials: July 12, 2024
  - Termination of Mission: January 12, 2026

== See also ==
- Marshall Islands – United States relations
- Foreign relations of the Marshall Islands
- Ambassadors of the United States
