= Clyde Bishop =

American diplomat

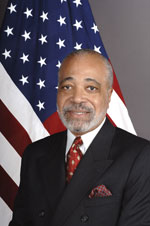
- U.S. State Dep’t photo

6th United States Ambassador to the Marshall Islands
- In office December 7, 2006 – January 20, 2009
- President: George W. Bush
- Preceded by: Greta N. Morris
- Succeeded by: Martha L. Campbell

Personal details
- Born: 1942 (age 83–84) Wilmington, Delaware
- Spouse: Cynthia DePaulo
- Children: Sean and Jeanne
- Profession: Diplomat

Dr. Clyde Bishop (born 1942) is an American diplomat. He was the U.S. Ambassador to the Marshall Islands from 2006 to 2009. He is a member of the U.S. Senior Foreign Service and is class of Minister Counselor.

== Biography & Career ==
Cylde Bishop was born in Wilmington, Delaware, but spent most of his youth growing up in Newark, Delaware. He then moved during his teen years to Red Bank, New Jersey and graduated from Red Bank Regional High School. Bishop received his Bachelor of Arts in Sociology from Delaware State College (now University) in 1964. He also earned a Master of Arts in Sociology from the University of Delaware in 1972 and was awarded a Ph.D in Urban Affairs in 1976. He is recognized as the first African American to earn a doctorate at the University of Delaware.

Dr. Bishop spent some time in academia as a research associate and director of the Urban Studies Program at the Southern Illinois University from 1974 to 1977. He returned to Delaware State College from 1977 to 1980, serving as chair of the Department of Sociology and Urban Affairs.

=== Career ===
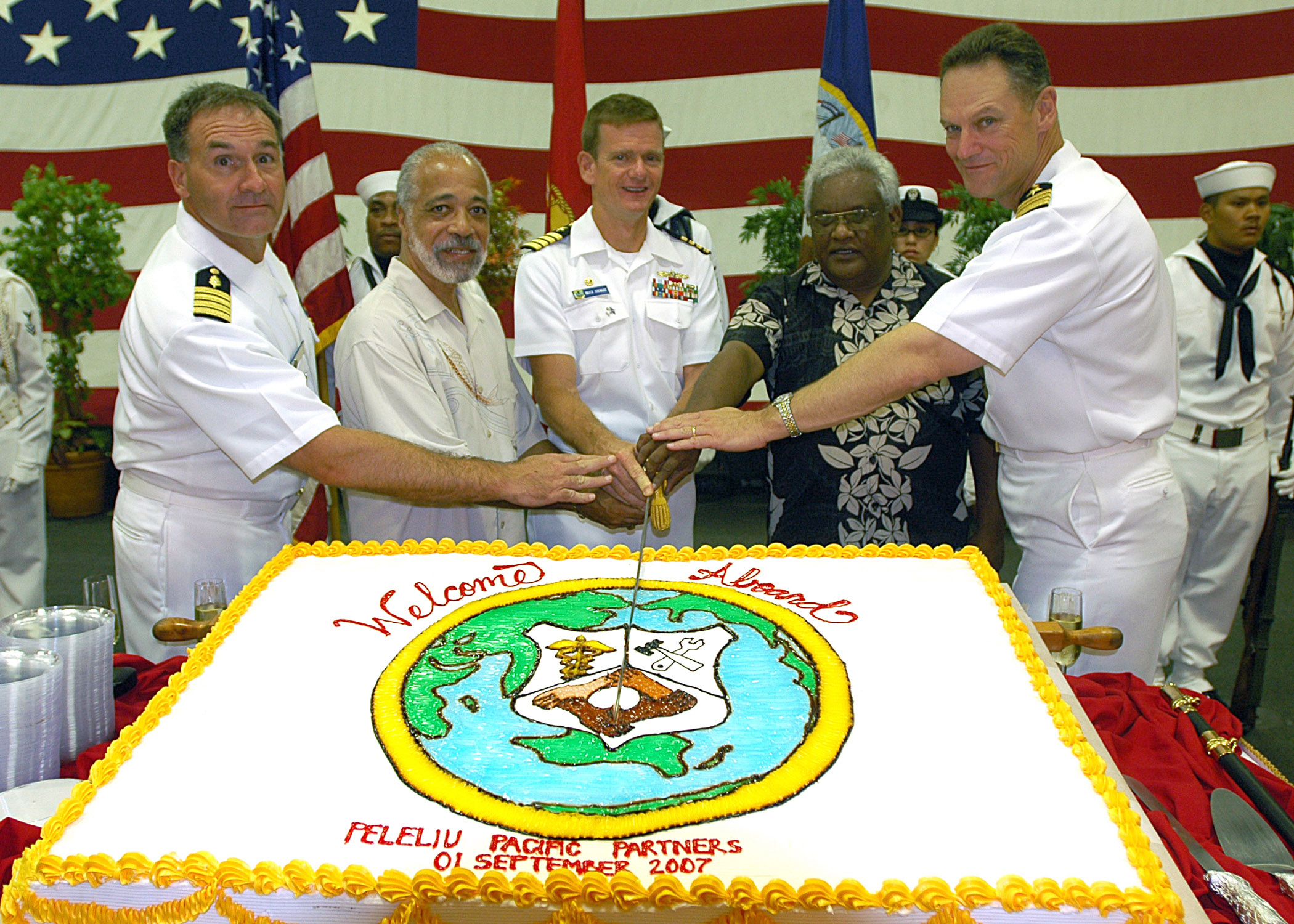
Ambassador Bishop aboard the USS Peleliu

After a short period in the New York City business sector, he began his U.S. Foreign Service career in 1982. Some of Clyde's assignments included the Consul General at the US Embassy in Santo Domingo, Dominican Republic. He also served as Principal Officer in Naples, Italy. His previous Foreign Service postings included Hong Kong, Bombay (Mumbai), Rio de Janeiro, and Korea. He began his career as a Consular Economic officer in Palermo, Italy. After 14 years of service, Bishop was nominated by President George W. Bush and confirmed as U.S. Ambassador to the Republic of the Marshall Islands on September 28, 2006. He assumed his duties on December 5, 2006, and left that post in 2009.

He was chosen by the U.S. State Department to receive the Superior Honor Award (1990) and Meritorious Honor Award (1989 and 1998). In addition to his native English, He is fluent in Italian, Spanish and Portuguese.

Dr. Bishop is married to Cynthia DePaulo, daughter of Sylvester and Geraldine DePaulo, and has two children, Sean and Jeanne, from a previous marriage. Bishop is the first Delaware State University graduate to be appointed to an ambassadorship in the U.S. State Department.

Diplomatic posts
Preceded by Greta N. Morris	United States Ambassador to the Marshall Islands; 2006–2009	Succeeded by Martha L. Campbell
