= Joan Plaisted =

American diplomat

Joan M. Plaisted

4th United States Ambassador to the Marshall Islands
- In office December 19, 1995 – July 28, 2000
- President: Bill Clinton
- Preceded by: David C. Fields
- Succeeded by: Michael J. Senko

6th United States Ambassador to Kiribati
- In office December 19, 1995 – July 28, 2000
- President: Bill Clinton
- Preceded by: Evelyn I. H. Teegan
- Succeeded by: Michael J. Senko

Personal details
- Born: August 29, 1945 (age 81) St. Peter, Minnesota, U.S.
- Education: American University; University of Grenoble
- Profession: Diplomat

Joan M. Plaisted (born August 29, 1945) is an American diplomat. A career diplomat of the United States Foreign Service, she was the United States Ambassador to the Marshall Islands and Kiribati from 1995 to 2000 concurrently, while resident in Majuro.

== Biography ==
Plaisted was born on August 29, 1945, in St. Peter, Minnesota. She received her early education in Willmar, Minnesota, and earned her B.A. in International Relations and M.A. in Asian Studies from the School of International Service at American University in Washington, D.C. in 1967. That same year, she graduated from the University of Grenoble. Prior to joining the U.S. Foreign Service, she began her career with the Department of Commerce working on Japan, Korea, and the Pacific Islands.

Plaisted joined the U.S. Foreign Service in 1973. She served as Office Director for Thailand and Burmese Affairs in the Department of State. From 1991 to 1994, she was Chargé d'affaires ad interim and Deputy Chief of Mission of the American Embassy in Rabat, Morocco. She also served in Hong Kong and Paris. In Washington, Plaisted served in the Office of Chinese Affairs. She also served with the Executive Office of the President, Office of the U.S. Trade Representative in Geneva, Switzerland.

On July 26, 1995, President Bill Clinton announced his intention to nominate Plaisted as Ambassador to the Republic of the Marshall Islands and the Republic of Kiribati. She was appointed on December 19, 1995, and served until her retirement on July 28, 2000. Later, she became a United States Senior Advisor to the United Nations, and remains politically active.

In May 1993, Plaisted was awarded American University's Lodestar Award, given to the university's most outstanding alumnus who best exemplifies the university's values. A graduate of the National War College Class of 1988, she is a recipient of the Department of State's Superior and Meritorious Honor Awards. She speaks French, as well as English.

Diplomatic posts
Preceded by Evelyn Irene Hoopes Teegan	United States Ambassador to Kiribati; 1995–2000	Succeeded by Michael James Senko
Preceded by David C. Fields	United States Ambassador to the Marshall Islands; 1995–2000	Succeeded by Michael James Senko
