= Kwajalein Junior/Senior High School =

Kwajalein Jr./Sr. High School

Location
- Kwajalein; Marshall Islands; 8°44′26″N 167°44′13″E

Information
- Type: High school
- School district: Kwajalein School System
- Website: kwajaleinschools.org/prospective-students/highschool/

Kwajalein Junior/Senior High School (KJSHS) is a secondary school in Kwajalein, Marshall Islands. It is a part of the Kwajalein School System.

The school serves families in the US military and civilians working for the US government. Some of the students are natives of the Marshall Islands. Circa 2009 the student count was 140.

The junior high school and the associated elementary school, initially directly operated by the DOD, opened in 1956. Contractors began operating the schools in 1959. The high school began operations in 1961.

== Images ==
KJSHS Spartans

Kwajalein Junior/Senior High School, Kwajalein, Marshall Islands

== See also ==
- Department of Defense Education Activity
