= Greta N. Morris =

American diplomat

Greta Morris
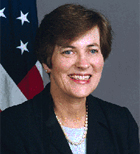

5th United States Ambassador to the Marshall Islands
- In office August 26, 2003 – December 7, 2006
- President: George W. Bush
- Preceded by: Michael J. Senko
- Succeeded by: Clyde Bishop

Personal details
- Born: 1947 (age 78–79) Redlands, California
- Education: University of Redlands; UCLA
- Profession: Diplomat

Greta N. Morris (born 1947) is a former United States Ambassador to the Republic of the Marshall Islands, serving from August 26, 2003, until she was succeeded by Clyde Bishop on December 6, 2006.

== Education ==
A native of Redlands, California, Ms. Morris earned her B.A. from the University of Redlands and an M.A. in English from the University of California, Los Angeles. Prior to joining the Foreign Service, she taught English at the high school and university levels in California and Indonesia. She was formerly the dean of the Department of State's School of Language Studies at the Foreign Service Institute.

== Career ==
Ms. Morris joined the Foreign Service in 1980. She is the recipient of two Superior Honor Awards and three Senior Foreign Service Performance Pay Awards. She speaks Indonesian, Thai, and French.

From 2006 to 2009, she served as U.S. ambassador to the Marshall Islands, having been appointed by President George W. Bush.

A career member of the Senior Foreign Service, Ms. Morris was most recently the Counselor for Public Affairs in Jakarta, where she led the U.S. Embassy's public diplomacy program to strengthen U.S.-Indonesia ties and to build support within Indonesia for counter-terrorism efforts.

Prior to her posting in Jakarta, Ms. Morris served as deputy director of the Office of Public Diplomacy in the Bureau for East Asian and Pacific Affairs. Previously, she had postings as Counselor for Public Affairs in The Philippines, as Public Affairs Officer in Uganda, and as Press Attaché in Thailand. Ms. Morris has also served as Director of the Office of Public Affairs in the Bureau of African Affairs, Information Center Director in Nairobi, Kenya, and Cultural and Exchanges Coordinator for Africa.

Diplomatic posts
Preceded by Michael J. Senko	United States Ambassador to the Marshall Islands; 2003–2006	Succeeded by Clyde Bishop
