= Samuel B. Thomsen =

American diplomat

1st United States Ambassador to the Marshall Islands
- In office June 15, 1987 – July 11, 1990
- President: Ronald Reagan; George H. W. Bush
- Preceded by: Position established
- Succeeded by: William Bodde, Jr.

Personal details
- Born: July 10, 1931 (age 94) Saint Paul, Minnesota, U.S.
- Spouse: Judith Thomsen
- Children: Katy Pistole, Samuel P. Thomsen, Robert Thomsen
- Profession: Diplomat

Military service
- Branch/service: United States Army
- Years of service: 1951–54

Samuel B. Thomsen (born July 10, 1931, in Saint Paul, Minnesota) is a former career diplomat who was the first United States Ambassador to the Marshall Islands, serving there from 1987 to 1990. Thomsen entered the United States Foreign Service in 1960 and served in various positions in the United States Department of State, and in diplomatic assignments to Vietnam, Laos, Botswana and Nigeria. While serving as Consul at Hue, Thomsen served as a political advisor to the commanding general of the U.S. Marines in Vietnam, Lt. Gen. Lewis Walt, from July 1965 to July 1966. During Thomsen's service in the Marshall Islands, the office of the U.S. Representative was upgraded to Embassy status.

== Background ==
Thomsen served in the United States Army from 1951 to 1954. He graduated from the University of California, Los Angeles in 1957 with a BA degree in political science. He was executive director of the University Religious Conference of Santa Barbara, California, from 1957 to 1960. He retired from the Foreign Service in September 1990. Since retiring, Thomsen has served as Vice President of DACOR (Diplomatic and Consular Officers, Retired) and as President of Thomsen International Associates.

Diplomatic posts
Preceded by post created	United States Ambassador to the Marshall Islands; 1987–1990	Succeeded by William Bodde, Jr.
