= David C. Fields =

American diplomat (1937–2024)

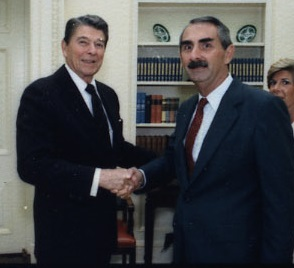
- David Fields (right) with President Ronald Reagan, 1987

3rd United States Ambassador to the Marshall Islands
- In office July 7, 1992 – May 15, 1995
- President: George H. W. Bush, Bill Clinton
- Preceded by: William Bodde, Jr.
- Succeeded by: Joan M. Plaisted

11th United States Ambassador to the Central African Republic
- In office October 16, 1986 – October 3, 1989
- President: Ronald Reagan; George H. W. Bush
- Preceded by: Edmund DeJarnette
- Succeeded by: Daniel Howard Simpson

Director of the Office of Foreign Missions
- In office March 8, 1990 – July 22, 1992
- President: George H. W. Bush
- Preceded by: James Edward Nolan, Jr.
- Succeeded by: Eric J. Boswell

Personal details
- Born: January 13, 1937 San Pedro, California, U.S.
- Died: June 12, 2024 (aged 87)
- Profession: Diplomat

David Clark Fields (January 13, 1937 – June 12, 2024) was an American diplomat. He was the United States Ambassador to the Central African Republic from 1986 to 1989 and the Marshall Islands from 1992 to 1995. He was also the second Director of the Office of Foreign Missions at the Department of State.

== Life and career ==
David Clark Fields was born on January 13, 1937. He later joined the United States Foreign Service. On October 16, 1986, Fields was appointed as the United States Ambassador to the Central African Republic, and presented his credentials to Central African president André Kolingba on December 4, 1986. He left that post on October 3, 1989. On March 8, 1990, Fields was appointed as Director of the Office of Foreign Missions and assumed duty on March 12, 1990. On July 22, 1992, he left that position upon his appointment as United States Ambassador to the Marshall Islands on July 7, 1992. Harry W. Porter III served as Acting Director of the Office of Foreign Missions from July 1992 to May 1993 until Eric J. Boswell assumed the office.

On August 19, 1992, Fields presented his credentials to Marshallese president Amata Kabua and formally commenced his ambassadorship; he was succeeded by Joan M. Plaisted and left the post on May 15, 1995.

He resided in California. Fields died on June 12, 2024, at the age of 87.

Diplomatic posts
Preceded by Edmund DeJarnette	United States Ambassador to Central African Republic; 1986–1989	Succeeded by Daniel Howard Simpson
Preceded by William Bodde, Jr.	United States Ambassador to the Marshall Islands; 1992–1995	Succeeded by Joan M. Plaisted
