= Bigej Island =

Coordinates: 8°53′39″N 167°46′21″E

Bigej or Begej /ˈbiːdʒiː/ (Marshallese: Pikeej, [pʲiɡɛːtʲ]) Island is part of Kwajalein Atoll in the Ralik Chain in the Republic of the Marshall Islands (RMI), 2,100 nautical miles (3900 km) southwest of Honolulu, Hawaii.
