= Martha L. Campbell =

American diplomat (born 1949)

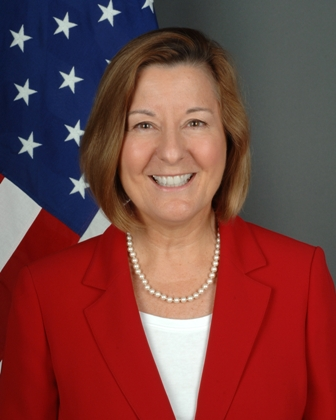
Martha L Campbell ambassador

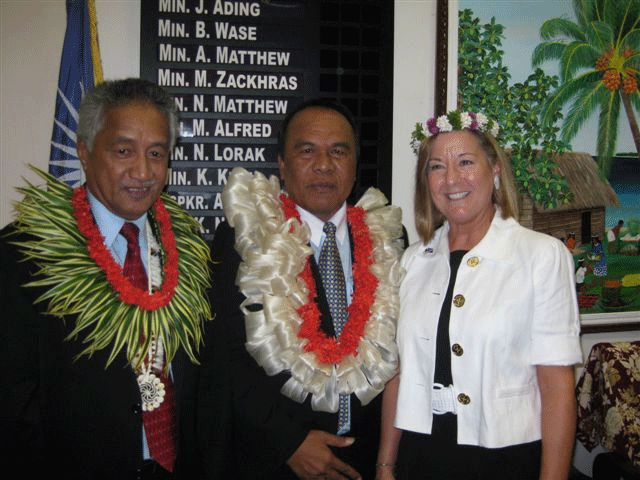
President Zedkaia (middle), flanked by Speaker Alvin Jacklick (L) and U.S. ambassador Martha Campbell

Martha Larzelere Campbell (born 1949) is a retired American Career Foreign Service Officer who served as Ambassador Extraordinary and Plenipotentiary to the Marshall Islands (2009–2012).

Prior to her appointment, Campbell served as Dean of the School of Professional and Area Studies at the Foreign Service Institute. Other positions include Executive Director of the Bureaus of European and Eurasian Affairs and International Organizations Affairs, opening the Office of the U.S. Representative in Majuro in the Marshall Islands in 1987, after the United States signed the Compact of Free Association and as a Special Assistant to the Under Secretary for Management in the Executive Office of the Bureau of European and Eurasian Affairs.

Campbell received her B.A from Kalamazoo College and her M.A. from the University of Notre Dame.
