= List of ambassadors appointed in the first Trump presidency =

U.S. ambassadors appointed by the 45th president

This is a list of United States ambassadors appointed by the 45th and 47th president of the United States, Donald Trump, during his first term in office (2017–2021).

Ambassadorships are often used as a form of political patronage to reward high-profile or important supporters of the president. The most visible ambassadorships are often distributed either in this way or to the president's ideological or partisan confreres. Most ambassadorships, however, are assigned to foreign service officers who have spent their career in the State Department. Regardless, all ambassadors must be formally appointed by the president and confirmed by the Senate. While all ambassadors serve at the president's pleasure and may be dismissed at any time, career diplomats usually serve tours of roughly three years before receiving a new assignment; political appointees customarily tender their resignations upon the inauguration of a new president.

44% of Trump's appointees were political, a substantially higher percentage than typical. As of October 2018, 92% of Trump's appointees were white and 74% were male, with zero black women.

== Key ==
CD, or career diplomats, denotes ambassadors who were appointed from the U.S. Foreign Service.

PA, or political appointees, denotes ambassadors who were not appointed from the Foreign Service.

== Ambassadors to foreign states ==
Office	Ambassador	Background	Assumed office	Left office
Ambassador to Afghanistan	John R. Bass	CD	December 12, 2017 (Confirmed 09/28/2017, voice vote)	January 6, 2020
Ambassador to Albania	Yuri Kim	CD	January 27, 2020 (Confirmed 12/19/2019, voice vote)	June 25, 2023
Ambassador to Algeria	John Desrocher	CD	September 5, 2017 (Confirmed August 3, 2017, voice vote)	January 20, 2021
Ambassador to Andorra	Duke Buchan	PA	January 18, 2018 (Confirmed November 2, 2017, voice vote)	January 20, 2021
Ambassador to Angola	Nina Maria Fite	CD	February 14, 2018 (Confirmed November 2, 2017, voice vote)	November 8, 2021
Ambassador to Argentina	Edward C. Prado	PA	May 15, 2018 (Confirmed 03/22/2018, voice vote)	January 20, 2021
Ambassador to Armenia	Lynne M. Tracy	CD	March 1, 2019 (Confirmed January 2, 2019, voice vote)	December 22, 2022
Ambassador to Australia	Arthur B. Culvahouse Jr.	PA	March 13, 2019 (Confirmed January 2, 2019, voice vote)	January 19, 2021
Ambassador to Austria	Trevor Traina	PA	May 24, 2018 (Confirmed 03/22/2018, voice vote)	January 20, 2021
Ambassador to Azerbaijan	Earle D. Litzenberger	CD	March 12, 2019 (Confirmed January 2, 2019, voice vote)	July 26, 2022
Ambassador to Bahrain	Justin Siberell	CD	November 12, 2017 (Confirmed 09/28/2017, voice vote)	July 13, 2020
Ambassador to Bangladesh	Earl R. Miller	CD	November 29, 2018 (Confirmed October 11, 2018, voice vote)	January 21, 2022
Ambassador to Belarus	Julie D. Fisher	CD	December 23, 2020 (Confirmed 12/15/2020, voice vote)	June 9, 2022
Ambassador to Belgium	Ronald Gidwitz	PA	July 4, 2018 (Confirmed 06/28/2018, voice vote)	January 20, 2021
Ambassador to Benin	Patricia A. Mahoney	CD	July 4, 2019 (Confirmed January 2, 2019, voice vote)	February 1, 2022
Ambassador to Bosnia and Herzegovina	Eric G. Nelson	CD	February 19, 2019 (Confirmed January 2, 2019, voice vote)	February 1, 2022
Ambassador to Botswana	Craig L. Cloud	CD	April 2, 2019 (Confirmed January 2, 2019, voice vote)	May 24, 2022
Ambassador to Brazil	Todd C. Chapman	CD	March 30, 2020 (Confirmed February 11, 2020, voice vote)	July 26, 2021
Ambassador to Brunei	Matthew J. Matthews	CD	April 15, 2019 (Confirmed January 2, 2019, voice vote)	May 20, 2020 (died in office)
Ambassador to Bulgaria	Herro Mustafa	CD	October 18, 2019 (Confirmed 09/26/2019, voice vote)	March 1, 2023
Ambassador to Burkina Faso	Sandra E. Clark	CD	September 25, 2020 (Confirmed August 6, 2020, voice vote)	December 18, 2023
Ambassador to Burma	Thomas Vajda	CD	January 19, 2021 (Confirmed 11/18/2020, voice vote)	December 17, 2022
Ambassador to Burundi	Melanie Harris Higgins	CD	March 2, 2021 (Confirmed 11/18/2020, voice vote)	July 13, 2023
Ambassador to Cabo Verde	Jeff Daigle	CD	September 10, 2019 (Confirmed 05/23/2019, voice vote)	July 3, 2024
Ambassador to Cambodia	W. Patrick Murphy	CD	October 19, 2019 (Confirmed August 1, 2019, voice vote)	May 18, 2024
Ambassador to Cameroon	Peter Barlerin	CD	December 20, 2017 (Confirmed November 2, 2017, voice vote)	July 16, 2020
Ambassador to Canada	Kelly Craft	PA	October 23, 2017 (Confirmed 08/03/2017, voice vote)	August 23, 2019
Ambassador to the Central African Republic	Lucy Tamlyn	CD	February 6, 2019 (Confirmed January 2, 2019, voice vote)	January 28, 2022
Ambassador to China	Terry Branstad	PA	July 12, 2017 (Confirmed 05/22/2017, 82–13)	October 4, 2020
Ambassador to Colombia	Philip S. Goldberg	CD	September 19, 2019 (Confirmed August 1, 2019, voice vote)	June 1, 2022
Ambassador to Comoros	Michael P. Pelletier	CD	June 24, 2019 (Confirmed January 2, 2019, voice vote)	June 18, 2021
Ambassador to the Democratic Republic of the Congo	Michael A. Hammer	CD	December 22, 2018 (Confirmed 09/06/2018, voice vote)	June 1, 2022
Ambassador to the Republic of the Congo	Todd P. Haskell	CD	June 26, 2017 (Confirmed 05/18/2017, voice vote)	January 28, 2021
Ambassador to Costa Rica	Sharon Day	PA	September 25, 2017 (Confirmed 08/03/2017, voice vote)	January 20, 2021
Ambassador to Cote d'Ivoire	Richard K. Bell	CD	October 10, 2019 (Confirmed August 1, 2019, voice vote)	January 31, 2023
Ambassador to Croatia	W. Robert Kohorst	PA	January 10, 2018 (Confirmed November 2, 2017, voice vote)	January 13, 2021
Ambassador to Cyprus	Judith G. Garber	CD	March 18, 2019 (Confirmed January 2, 2019, voice vote)	December 22, 2022
Ambassador to the Czech Republic	Stephen B. King	PA	December 6, 2017 (Confirmed 10/05/2017, voice vote)	January 20, 2021
Ambassador to Denmark	Carla Sands	PA	December 15, 2017 (Confirmed November 2, 2017, voice vote)	January 20, 2021
Ambassador to Djibouti	Larry André Jr.	CD	November 20, 2017 (Confirmed November 2, 2017, voice vote)	January 20, 2021
Ambassador to Djibouti	Jonathan Pratt	CD	February 22, 2021 (Confirmed 12/15/2020, voice vote)	May 18, 2023
Ambassador to the Dominican Republic	Robin Bernstein	PA	September 3, 2018 (Confirmed 06/28/2018, voice vote)	January 20, 2021
Ambassador to Ecuador	Michael J. Fitzpatrick	CD	July 3, 2019 (Confirmed 05/23/2019, voice vote)	June 15, 2024
Ambassador to Egypt	Jonathan R. Cohen	CD	November 17, 2019 (Confirmed August 1, 2019, voice vote)	March 31, 2022
Ambassador to El Salvador	Ronald D. Johnson	PA	September 6, 2019 (Confirmed 06/27/2019, voice vote)	January 20, 2021
Ambassador to Equatorial Guinea	Susan N. Stevenson	CD	April 11, 2019 (Confirmed January 2, 2019, voice vote)	September 30, 2021
Ambassador to Estonia	William E. Grayson	PA	— (Note: Never assumed this position.) (Confirmed August 6, 2020, voice vote)	—
Ambassador to Eswatini	Jeanne M. Maloney	CD	March 4, 2021 (Confirmed 11/18/2020, voice vote)	December 20, 2022
Ambassador to Ethiopia	Michael A. Raynor	CD	September 29, 2017 (Confirmed 08/03/2017, voice vote)	January 20, 2021
Ambassador to Ethiopia	Geeta Pasi	CD	March 5, 2021 (Confirmed 12/22/2020, voice vote)	February 25, 2022
Ambassador to Fiji	Joseph Cella	PA	December 23, 2019 (Confirmed 09/24/2019, 56–38)	January 20, 2021
Ambassador to Finland	Robert Pence	PA	May 24, 2018 (Confirmed 03/22/2018, voice vote)	January 20, 2021
Ambassador to France	Jamie McCourt	PA	December 18, 2017 (Confirmed November 2, 2017, voice vote)	January 20, 2021
Ambassador to Gabon	Joel Danies	CD	April 18, 2018 (Confirmed 02/15/2018, voice vote)	March 1, 2019
Ambassador to The Gambia	Richard Carlton Paschall III	CD	April 9, 2019 (Confirmed January 2, 2019, voice vote)	February 15, 2022
Ambassador to Georgia	Kelly C. Degnan	CD	January 31, 2020 (Confirmed 12/19/2019, voice vote)	August 29, 2023
Ambassador to Germany	Richard Grenell	PA	May 8, 2018 (Confirmed 04/26/2018, 56–42)	June 1, 2020
Ambassador to Ghana	Stephanie S. Sullivan	CD	January 23, 2019 (Confirmed 09/06/2018, voice vote)	April 8, 2022
Ambassador to Guatemala	Luis E. Arreaga	CD	October 3, 2017 (Confirmed 08/03/2017, voice vote)	October 2, 2020
Ambassador to Guatemala	William W. Popp	CD	October 19, 2020 (Confirmed August 6, 2020, voice vote)	August 24, 2023
Ambassador to Guinea	Simon Henshaw	CD	March 4, 2019 (Confirmed January 2, 2019, voice vote)	June 9, 2020 (died in office)
Ambassador to Guinea-Bissau	Tulinabo S. Mushingi	CD	August 4, 2017 (Confirmed 05/18/2017, voice vote)	February 1, 2022
Ambassador to Guyana	Sarah-Ann Lynch	CD	March 13, 2019 (Confirmed January 2, 2019, voice vote)	September 12, 2023
Ambassador to Haiti	Michele J. Sison	CD	February 21, 2018 (Confirmed November 2, 2017, voice vote)	October 9, 2021
Ambassador to the Holy See	Callista Gingrich	PA	December 22, 2017 (Confirmed 10/16/2017, 70–23)	January 20, 2021
Ambassador to Hungary	David B. Cornstein	PA	June 22, 2018 (Confirmed 05/24/2018, voice vote)	October 30, 2020
Ambassador to Iceland	Jeffrey Ross Gunter	PA	July 2, 2019 (Confirmed 05/23/2019, voice vote)	January 20, 2021
Ambassador to India	Kenneth I. Juster	PA	November 23, 2017 (Confirmed November 2, 2017, voice vote)	January 20, 2021
Ambassador to Indonesia	Sung Y. Kim	CD	October 21, 2020 (Confirmed August 6, 2020, voice vote)	November 21, 2023
Ambassador to Iraq	Matthew Tueller	CD	June 9, 2019 (Confirmed 05/16/2019, voice vote)	June 2, 2022
Ambassador to Ireland	Edward F. Crawford	PA	July 1, 2019 (Confirmed 06/13/2019, 90–4)	January 19, 2021
Ambassador to Israel	David M. Friedman	PA	May 15, 2017 (Confirmed 03/23/2017, 52–46)	January 20, 2021
Ambassador to Italy	Lewis Eisenberg	PA	October 4, 2017 (Confirmed 08/03/2017, voice vote)	January 4, 2021
Ambassador to Jamaica	Donald Tapia	PA	September 11, 2019 (Confirmed 07/18/2019, 66-26)	January 20, 2021
Ambassador to Japan	Bill Hagerty	PA	August 31, 2017 (Confirmed 07/13/2017, 86-12)	July 22, 2019
Ambassador to Jordan	Henry T. Wooster	CD	October 18, 2020 (Confirmed August 6, 2020, voice vote)	July 16, 2023
Ambassador to Kazakhstan	William H. Moser	CD	March 27, 2019 (Confirmed January 2, 2019, voice vote)	October 25, 2021
Ambassador to Kenya	Kyle McCarter	PA	March 12, 2019 (Confirmed January 2, 2019, voice vote)	January 20, 2021
Ambassador to Kiribati	Joseph Cella	PA	December 23, 2019 (Confirmed 09/24/2019, 56–38)	January 20, 2021
Ambassador to Kosovo	Philip S. Kosnett	CD	December 3, 2018 (Confirmed 09/06/2018, voice vote)	September 17, 2021
Ambassador to Kuwait	Alina Romanowski	CD	February 11, 2020 (Confirmed 12/19/2019, voice vote)	April 15, 2022
Ambassador to Kyrgyzstan	Donald Lu	CD	October 12, 2018 (Confirmed 09/06/2018, voice vote)	September 14, 2021
Ambassador to Laos	Peter Haymond	CD	February 7, 2020 (Confirmed 12/19/2019, voice vote)	September 1, 2023
Ambassador to Latvia	John Carwile	CD	November 5, 2019 (Confirmed 09/26/2019, voice vote)	January 27, 2023
Ambassador to Lebanon	Dorothy Shea	CD	March 11, 2020 (Confirmed 02/11/2020, voice vote)	December 28, 2023
Ambassador to Lesotho	Rebecca E. Gonzales	CD	February 8, 2018 (Confirmed 11/16/2017, voice vote)	February 4, 2022
Ambassador to Liberia	Michael A. McCarthy	CD	January 22, 2021 (Confirmed 11/18/2020, voice vote)	July 12, 2023
Ambassador to Libya	Richard B. Norland	CD	August 8, 2019 (Confirmed August 1, 2019, voice vote)	September 8, 2022
Ambassador to Liechtenstein	Ed McMullen	PA	November 21, 2017 (Confirmed November 2, 2017, voice vote)	January 20, 2021
Ambassador to Lithuania	Robert S. Gilchrist	CD	February 4, 2020 (Confirmed 12/19/2019, voice vote)	August 12, 2023
Ambassador to Luxembourg	Randy Evans	PA	June 19, 2018 (Confirmed 05/24/2018, 48–43)	January 20, 2021
Ambassador to Madagascar	Michael P. Pelletier	CD	March 5, 2019 (Confirmed January 2, 2019, voice vote)	June 18, 2021
Ambassador to Malawi	Robert K. Scott	CD	August 6, 2019 (Confirmed 04/11/2019, voice vote)	October 20, 2021
Ambassador to Malaysia	Brian D. McFeeters	CD	February 26, 2021 (Confirmed 12/22/2020, voice vote)	August 24, 2023
Ambassador to the Maldives	Alaina B. Teplitz	CD	November 1, 2018 (Confirmed 09/06/2018, voice vote)	December 6, 2021
Ambassador to Mali	Dennis B. Hankins	CD	March 15, 2019 (Confirmed January 2, 2019, voice vote)	September 26, 2022
Ambassador to the Marshall Islands	Roxanne Cabral	CD	February 6, 2020 (Confirmed 12/19/2019, voice vote)	March 3, 2023
Ambassador to Mauritania	Michael Dodman	CD	March 13, 2018 (Confirmed November 2, 2017, voice vote)	February 2021
Ambassador to Mauritania	Cynthia Kierscht	CD	June 22, 2021 (Confirmed 12/22/2020, voice vote)	July 9, 2024
Ambassador to Mauritius	David Dale Reimer	CD	January 16, 2018 (Confirmed November 2, /2017, voice vote)	January 15, 2021
Ambassador to Mexico	Christopher Landau	PA	August 26, 2019 (Confirmed August 1, 2019, voice vote)	January 20, 2021
Ambassador to the Federated States of Micronesia	Carmen G. Cantor	CD	January 31, 2020 (Confirmed 12/19/2019, voice vote)	August 4, 2022
Ambassador to Moldova	Dereck J. Hogan	CD	November 2, 2018 (Confirmed 09/06/2018, voice vote)	July 21, 2021
Ambassador to Monaco	Jamie McCourt	PA	December 18, 2017 (Confirmed November 2, 2017, voice vote)	January 20, 2021
Ambassador to Mongolia	Michael S. Klecheski	CD	February 22, 2019 (Confirmed January 2, 2019, voice vote)	September 24, 2022
Ambassador to Montenegro	Judy Rising Reinke	CD	December 20, 2018 (Confirmed 09/06/2018, voice vote)	January 16, 2026
Ambassador to Morocco	David T. Fischer	PA	January 22, 2020 (Confirmed 12/19/2019, voice vote)	January 20, 2021
Ambassador to Mozambique	Dennis Walter Hearne	CD	April 3, 2019 (Confirmed January 2, 2019, voice vote)	January 19, 2022
Ambassador to Namibia	Lisa A. Johnson	CD	November 21, 2017 (Confirmed 11/16/2017, voice vote)	July 2, 2021
Ambassador to Nauru	Joseph Cella	PA	December 23, 2019 (Confirmed 09/24/2019, 56–38)	January 20, 2021
Ambassador to Nepal	Randy W. Berry	CD	October 25, 2018 (Confirmed 09/06/2018, voice vote)	October 2, 2022
Ambassador to the Netherlands	Pete Hoekstra	PA	January 10, 2018 (Confirmed 11/09/2017, voice vote)	January 17, 2021
Ambassador to New Zealand	Scott Brown	PA	June 27, 2017 (Confirmed 06/08/2017, 94–4)	December 20, 2020
Ambassador to Nicaragua	Kevin K. Sullivan	CD	November 14, 2018 (Confirmed 10/11/2018, voice vote)	May 19, 2023
Ambassador to Niger	Eric P. Whitaker	CD	January 26, 2018 (Confirmed November 2, 2017, voice vote)	December 1, 2021
Ambassador to Nigeria	Mary Beth Leonard	CD	December 24, 2019 (Confirmed August 1, 2019, voice vote)	March 31, 2023
Ambassador to North Macedonia	Kate Marie Byrnes	CD	July 12, 2019 (Confirmed 05/23/2019, voice vote)	September 26, 2022
Ambassador to Norway	Kenneth Braithwaite	PA	February 8, 2018 (Confirmed 12/21/2017, voice vote)	May 29, 2020
Ambassador to Oman	Leslie Tsou	CD	January 10, 2020 (Confirmed 12/19/2019, voice vote)	March 30, 2023
Ambassador to Palau	John Hennessey-Niland	CD	March 6, 2020 (Confirmed 02/11/2020, voice vote)	September 9, 2022
Ambassador to Papua New Guinea	Erin Elizabeth McKee	CD	November 27, 2019 (Confirmed 09/26/2019, voice vote)	April 14, 2022
Ambassador to Paraguay	M. Lee McClenny	CD	February 20, 2018 (Confirmed 12/21/2017, voice vote)	September 16, 2020
Ambassador to Peru	Krishna R. Urs	CD	October 25, 2017 (Confirmed 08/03/2017, voice vote)	July 29, 2020
Ambassador to Peru	Lisa D. Kenna	CD	March 22, 2021 (Confirmed 11/18/2020, voice vote)	September 8, 2023
Ambassador to Poland	Georgette Mosbacher	PA	September 6, 2018 (Confirmed 07/12/2018, voice vote)	January 20, 2021
Ambassador to Portugal	George Edward Glass	PA	August 25, 2017 (Confirmed 08/03/2017, voice vote)	January 13, 2021
Ambassador to Romania	Adrian Zuckerman	PA	December 17, 2019 (Confirmed 11/20/2019, 65–30)	January 20, 2021
Ambassador to Russia	Jon Huntsman Jr.	PA	October 3, 2017 (Confirmed 09/28/2017, voice vote)	October 3, 2019
Ambassador to Russia	John J. Sullivan	PA	February 5, 2020 (Confirmed 12/12/2019, 70–22)	September 4, 2022
Ambassador to Rwanda	Peter H. Vrooman	CD	April 3, 2018 (Confirmed 02/15/2018, voice vote)	January 24, 2022
Ambassador to Samoa	Scott Brown	PA	June 27, 2017 (Confirmed 06/08/2017, 94–4)	December 20, 2020
Ambassador to San Marino	Lewis Eisenberg	PA	October 4, 2017 (Confirmed 08/03/2017, voice vote)	January 4, 2021
Ambassador to São Tomé and Príncipe	Joel Danies	CD	April 20, 2018 (Confirmed 02/15/2018, voice vote)	March 1, 2019
Ambassador to Saudi Arabia	John Abizaid	PA	June 16, 2019 (Confirmed 04/10/2019, 92–7)	January 20, 2021
Ambassador to Senegal	Tulinabo S. Mushingi	CD	August 4, 2017 (Confirmed 05/18/2017, voice vote)	February 1, 2022
Ambassador to Serbia	Anthony F. Godfrey	CD	October 24, 2019 (Confirmed 09/26/2019, voice vote)	February 12, 2022
Ambassador to Seychelles	David Dale Reimer	CD	February 6, 2018 (Confirmed November 2, 2017, voice vote)	January 15, 2021
Ambassador to Sierra Leone	Maria E. Brewer	CD	September 20, 2017 (Confirmed 08/03/2017, voice vote)	February 22, 2021
Ambassador to Sierra Leone	David Dale Reimer	CD	March 24, 2021 (Confirmed 12/22/2020, voice vote)	August 24, 2023
Ambassador to Slovakia	Bridget A. Brink	CD	August 20, 2019 (Confirmed 05/23/2019, voice vote)	May 18, 2022
Ambassador to Slovenia	Lynda Blanchard	PA	August 29, 2019 (Confirmed 07/18/2019, 54–40)	January 20, 2021
Ambassador to the Solomon Islands	Erin Elizabeth McKee	CD	November 27, 2019 (Confirmed 09/26/2019, voice vote)	April 14, 2022
Ambassador to Somalia	Donald Yamamoto	CD	November 17, 2018 (Confirmed 10/11/2018, voice vote)	July 2021
Ambassador to South Africa	Lana Marks	PA	January 28, 2020 (Confirmed 09/26/2019, voice vote)	January 20, 2021
Ambassador to South Korea	Harry B. Harris Jr.	PA	July 6, 2018 (Confirmed 06/28/2018, voice vote)	January 20, 2021
Ambassador to South Sudan	Thomas Hushek	CD	June 5, 2018 (Confirmed 04/26/2018, voice vote)	July 17, 2020
Ambassador to Spain	Duke Buchan	PA	January 18, 2018 (Confirmed November 2, 2017, voice vote)	January 20, 2021
Ambassador to Sri Lanka	Alaina B. Teplitz	CD	November 1, 2018 (Confirmed 09/06/2018, voice vote)	December 6, 2021
Ambassador to Suriname	Karen L. Williams	CD	November 20, 2018 (Confirmed 10/11/2018, voice vote)	November 3, 2022
Ambassador to Sweden	Ken Howery	PA	November 7, 2019 (Confirmed 09/17/2019, 62–32)	January 20, 2021
Ambassador to Switzerland	Ed McMullen	PA	November 21, 2017 (Confirmed November 2, 2017, voice vote)	January 20, 2021
Ambassador to Tajikistan	John M. Pommersheim	CD	March 15, 2019 (Confirmed January 2, 2019, voice vote)	December 2, 2022
Ambassador to Tanzania	Don J. Wright	CD	August 2, 2020 (Confirmed 02/11/2020, voice vote)	January 11, 2023
Ambassador to Thailand	Michael G. DeSombre	PA	March 2, 2020 (Confirmed 01/08/2020, 91–7)	January 20, 2021
Ambassador to Timor-Leste	Kathleen M. Fitzpatrick	CD	January 19, 2018 (Confirmed November 2, 2017, voice vote)	November 18, 2020
Ambassador to Timor-Leste	C. Kevin Blackstone	CD	March 19, 2021 (Confirmed 12/22/2020, voice vote)	August 2, 2021
Ambassador to Togo	Eric Stromayer	CD	April 11, 2019 (Confirmed January 2, 2019, voice vote)	March 9, 2022
Ambassador to Tonga	Joseph Cella	PA	December 23, 2019 (Confirmed 09/24/2019, 56–38)	January 20, 2021
Ambassador to Trinidad and Tobago	Joseph Mondello	PA	October 22, 2018 (Confirmed 06/28/2018, voice vote)	January 13, 2021
Ambassador to Tunisia	Donald Blome	CD	February 21, 2019 (Confirmed January 2, 2019, voice vote)	April 5, 2022
Ambassador to Turkey	David M. Satterfield	CD	August 28, 2019 (Confirmed 06/27/2019, voice vote)	January 7, 2022
Ambassador to Turkmenistan	Matthew Klimow	CD	June 26, 2019 (Confirmed 05/23/2019, voice vote)	July 6, 2024
Ambassador to Tuvalu	Joseph Cella	PA	December 23, 2019 (Confirmed 09/24/2019, 56–38)	January 20, 2021
Ambassador to Uganda	Natalie E. Brown	CD	November 17, 2020 (Confirmed August 6, 2020, voice vote)	August 30, 2023
Ambassador to the United Arab Emirates	John Rakolta	PA	October 27, 2019 (Confirmed 09/17/2019, 63–30)	January 19, 2021
Ambassador to the United Kingdom	Woody Johnson	PA	August 29, 2017 (Confirmed 08/03/2017, voice vote)	January 20, 2021
Ambassador to Uruguay	Kenn George	PA	September 2, 2019 (Confirmed August 1, 2019, voice vote)	January 20, 2021
Ambassador to Uzbekistan	Daniel N. Rosenblum	CD	May 24, 2019 (Confirmed 04/11/2019, voice vote)	August 30, 2022
Ambassador to Vanuatu	Erin Elizabeth McKee	CD	November 27, 2019 (Confirmed 09/26/2019, voice vote)	April 14, 2022
Ambassador to Venezuela	James B. Story	CD	November 18, 2020 (Confirmed 11/18/2020, voice vote)	May 19, 2023
Ambassador to Vietnam	Daniel Kritenbrink	CD	November 6, 2017 (Confirmed 10/26/2017, voice vote)	April 16, 2021
Ambassador to Yemen	Christopher Henzel	CD	May 20, 2019 (Confirmed January 2, 2019, voice vote)	May 2021
Ambassador to Zambia	Daniel Lewis Foote	CD	December 17, 2017 (Confirmed November 2, 2017, voice vote)	December 24, 2019
Ambassador to Zimbabwe	Brian A. Nichols	CD	July 19, 2018 (Confirmed 06/28/2018, voice vote)	September 14, 2021

== Ambassadors to international organizations ==
=== United States Mission to the United Nations ===
Office	Ambassador	Background	Assumed office	Left office
Representative to the United Nations and Representative in the Security Council of the United Nations (with the rank of ambassador)	Nikki Haley	PA	January 27, 2017 (Confirmed 01/24/2017, 96–4)	December 31, 2018
Representative to the United Nations and Representative in the Security Council of the United Nations (with the rank of ambassador)	Kelly Craft	PA	September 12, 2019 (Confirmed 07/31/2019, 56–34)	January 20, 2021
Deputy Representative to the United Nations and Deputy Representative in the Security Council of the United Nations (with the rank of ambassador)	Jonathan R. Cohen	CD	June 8, 2018 (Confirmed 05/24/2018, voice vote)	August 1, 2019
Deputy Representative to the United Nations and Deputy Representative in the Security Council of the United Nations (with the rank of ambassador)	Richard M. Mills Jr.	CD	November 9, 2020 (Confirmed August 6, 2020, voice vote)	June 21, 2024
Representative to the United Nations and Other International Organizations in Geneva (with the rank of ambassador)	Andrew Bremberg	PA	November 12, 2019 (Confirmed 10/22/2019, 50–44)	January 20, 2021
Representative to the Vienna Office of the United Nations (with the rank of ambassador)	Jackie Wolcott	PA	October 22, 2018 (Confirmed 09/24/2018, 75-19)	January 18, 2021
Representative to the United Nations Agencies for Food and Agriculture (with the rank of ambassador)	Kip E. Tom	PA	May 22, 2019 (Confirmed 04/11/2019, voice vote)	January 20, 2021
Representative to the United Nations for U.N. Management and Reform (with the rank of ambassador)	Cherith Norman Chalet	PA	October 17, 2018 (Confirmed 09/12/2018, voice vote)	January 20, 2021
Representative to the Economic and Social Council of the United Nations (with the rank of ambassador)	Kelley Eckels Currie	PA	August 2017 (Confirmed 08/03/2017, voice vote)	February 18, 2019

=== Other international organizations ===
Office	Ambassador	Background	Assumed office	Left office
Representative to the African Union (with the rank of ambassador)	Jessica Lapenn	CD	October 14, 2019 (Confirmed August 1, 2019, voice vote)	February 1, 2023
Director of the Asian Development Bank (with the rank of ambassador)	Jason Chung	PA	August 2020 (Confirmed August 6, 2020, voice vote)	January 2021
Representative to the European Union (with the rank of ambassador)	Gordon Sondland	PA	July 9, 2018 (Confirmed 06/26/2018, voice vote)	February 7, 2020
Representative to the International Atomic Energy Agency (with the rank of ambassador)	Jackie Wolcott	PA	October 22, 2018 (Confirmed 09/24/2018, 75-19)	January 18, 2021
Representative on the Council of the International Civil Aviation Organization (with the rank of ambassador)	Thomas L. Carter	PA	December 10, 2017 (Confirmed November 2, 2017, voice vote)	February 28, 2020
Permanent Representative on the Council of the North Atlantic Treaty Organization (with the rank of ambassador)	Kay Bailey Hutchison	PA	August 28, 2017 (Confirmed 08/03/2017, voice vote)	January 20, 2021
Permanent Representative to the Organization of American States (with the rank of ambassador)	Carlos Trujillo	PA	April 5, 2018 (Confirmed 03/22/2018, voice vote)	January 19, 2021
Representative to the Organisation for the Prohibition of Chemical Weapons (with the rank of ambassador)	Joseph Manso	CD	September 23, 2020 (Confirmed August 6, 2020, voice vote)	December 29, 2023
Representative to the Organization for Security and Cooperation in Europe (with the rank of ambassador)	Jim Gilmore	PA	July 2, 2019 (Confirmed 05/23/2019, voice vote)	January 20, 2021

== Ambassadors-at-large ==
Office	Ambassador	Background	Assumed office	Left office
Coordinator for Counterterrorism (with the rank of ambassador-at-large)	Nathan Sales	PA	August 10, 2017 (Confirmed 08/03/2017, voice vote)	January 20, 2021
Ambassador-at-Large for Global Criminal Justice	Morse Tan	PA	December 31, 2019 (Confirmed 12/19/2019, voice vote)	January 20, 2021
Ambassador-at-Large for Global Women's Issues	Kelley Eckels Currie	PA	January 14, 2020 (Confirmed 12/19/2019, voice vote)	January 20, 2021
Ambassador-at-Large for International Religious Freedom	Sam Brownback	PA	February 1, 2018 (Confirmed 01/24/2018, 50–49)	January 20, 2021
Director of the Office to Monitor and Combat Trafficking (with the rank of ambassador-at-large)	John Cotton Richmond	PA	October 17, 2018 (Confirmed 10/11/2018, voice vote)	January 20, 2021

== Trade representatives ==
Office	Ambassador	Background	Assumed office	Left office
United States Trade Representative (with the rank of ambassador)	Robert Lighthizer	PA	May 15, 2017 (Confirmed 05/11/2017, 82–14)	January 20, 2021
Deputy United States Trade Representative for Asia, Europe, the Middle East, and Industrial Competitiveness (with the rank of ambassador)	Jeffrey Gerrish	PA	March 19, 2018 (Confirmed 03/05/2018, voice vote)	August 2020
Deputy United States Trade Representative for the Office of Geneva (with the rank of ambassador)	Dennis Shea	PA	March 12, 2018 (Confirmed 03/01/2018, voice vote)	January 20, 2021
Deputy United States Trade Representative for Investment, Services, Labor, Environment, Africa, China, and the Western Hemisphere (with the rank of ambassador)	C. J. Mahoney	PA	March 13, 2018 (Confirmed 03/01/2018, voice vote)	December 31, 2020
Deputy United States Trade Representative for Investment, Services, Labor, Environment, Africa, China, and the Western Hemisphere (with the rank of ambassador)	Michael N. Nemelka	PA	September 8, 2020 (Confirmed 08/13/2020, voice vote)	January 20, 2021
Chief Agricultural Negotiator of the Office of the United States Trade Representative (with the rank of ambassador)	Gregg Doud	PA	March 12, 2018 (Confirmed 03/01/2018, voice vote)	January 20, 2021

== Other positions with rank of ambassador ==
Office	Ambassador	Background	Assumed office	Left office
Chief of Protocol (with the rank of ambassador)	Sean Lawler	PA	December 1, 2017 (Confirmed 11/16/2017, voice vote)	July 9, 2019
Director of the Office of Foreign Missions (with the rank of ambassador)	Stephen Akard	PA	September 16, 2019 (Confirmed 09/11/2019, 90–2)	August 7, 2020
Special Representative of the President for Nuclear Nonproliferation (with the rank of ambassador)	Jeffrey Eberhardt	CD	June 2019 (Confirmed 06/20/2019, voice vote)	January 20, 2021

== Career ambassadors ==
Office	Ambassador	Background	Confirmed	Death
Career Ambassador	Philip S. Goldberg	CD	09/06/2018, voice vote	living
Career Ambassador	David Hale	CD	09/06/2018, voice vote	living
Career Ambassador	Michele J. Sison	CD	09/06/2018, voice vote	living
Career Ambassador	Daniel Bennett Smith	CD	09/06/2018, voice vote	living

== Unsuccessful nominations ==
Office	Nominee	Background	Nominated	Nomination terminated	Note
Representative on the Economic and Social Council of the United Nations (with the rank of ambassador)	Jennifer Yue Barber	PA	January 6, 2020	September 8, 2020	Nomination withdrawn by President Trump
Representative to the Organisation for Economic Co-operation and Development (with the rank of ambassador)	Pamela Bates	PA	September 24, 2018	January 3, 2020	Nomination returned to the president
Ambassador to Belize	André Bauer	PA	July 21, 2020	January 3, 2021	Nomination returned to the president
Ambassador to Panama	Erik Bethel	PA	May 4, 2020	January 3, 2021	Nomination returned to the president
Ambassador to Norway	Mark Burkhalter	PA	May 21, 2020	January 3, 2021	Nomination returned to the president
Ambassador to Ukraine	Keith Dayton	PA	May 14, 2020	January 3, 2021	Nomination returned to the president
Ambassador to the Bahamas	William A. Douglass	PA	May 21, 2020	February 4, 2021	Nomination withdrawn by President Biden
Ambassador to Chile	Andrew M. Gellert	PA	January 8, 2018	August 16, 2018	Nomination withdrawn by President Trump
Ambassador to Australia	Harry B. Harris Jr.	PA	February 13, 2018	May 23, 2018	Nomination withdrawn by President Trump, and successfully renominated as Ambassador to South Korea
Chief of Protocol (with the rank of ambassador)	Cam Henderson	PA	February 27, 2020	January 3, 2021	Nomination returned to the president
Ambassador to Albania	Kathleen A. Kavalec	CD	July 9, 2018	January 3, 2019	Nomination returned to the president
Ambassador to Chad	Steven Koutsis	CD	August 1, 2019	January 3, 2021	Nomination returned to the president
Ambassador to Chile	Leora Levy	PA	October 15, 2019	January 3, 2021	Nomination returned to the president
Representative to the Association of Southeast Asian Nations (with the rank of ambassador)	John Linder	PA	March 11, 2019	January 3, 2020	Nomination returned to the president
Ambassador to Germany	Douglas Macgregor	PA	July 29, 2020	January 3, 2021	Nomination returned to the president
Ambassador to Colombia	Joseph Macmanus	CD	November 29, 2017	January 4, 2019	Nomination returned to the president
Ambassador to the Bahamas	Doug Manchester	PA	May 16, 2017	November 13, 2019	Nomination withdrawn by President Trump
Ambassador to Estonia	Edward Masso	PA	September 5, 2017	May 24, 2018	Nomination withdrawn by President Trump
Ambassador to Belgium	Jamie McCourt	PA	June 26, 2017	August 2, 2017	Nomination withdrawn by President Trump, and successfully renominated as Ambassador to Monaco
Ambassador to Singapore	K. T. McFarland	PA	June 15, 2017	February 5, 2018	Nomination withdrawn by President Trump
Alternate Representative for Special Political Affairs in the United Nations (with the rank of ambassador)	Jay Patrick Murray	PA	May 10, 2017	January 3, 2018	Nomination returned to the president
Ambassador to Honduras	Francisco Palmieri	CD	July 9, 2018	January 3, 2019	Nomination returned to the president
Ambassador to Qatar	Mary Catherine Phee	CD	November 13, 2018	January 3, 2019	Nomination returned to the president
Representative to the Association of Southeast Asian Nations (with the rank of ambassador)	Eldon Regua	PA	December 2, 2020	January 3, 2021	Nomination returned to the president
Ambassador to Antigua and Barbuda; Ambassador to Barbados; Ambassador to Dominica; Ambassador to Grenada; Ambassador to Saint Kitts and Nevis; Ambassador to Saint Lucia; Ambassador to Saint Vincent and the Grenadines	Leandro Rizzuto Jr.	PA	January 8, 2018	January 3, 2020	Nomination returned to the president
Ambassador to Afghanistan	William P. Ruger	PA	September 10, 2020	January 3, 2021	Nomination returned to the president
Representative to the Organisation for Economic Co-operation and Development (with the rank of ambassador)	Manisha Singh	PA	May 4, 2020	January 3, 2021	Nomination returned to the president
Alternate Representative for Special Political Affairs in the United Nations (with the rank of ambassador)	Austin M. Smith	PA	September 12, 2018	January 3, 2019	Nomination returned to the president
Ambassador to Singapore	Barbera Hale Thornhill	PA	October 15, 2019	February 4, 2021	Nomination withdrawn by President Biden
Ambassador to Pakistan	William E. Todd	CD	February 27, 2020	January 3, 2021	Nomination returned to the president
Ambassador to Malta	Christine Toretti	PA	May 24, 2018	January 3, 2021	Nomination returned to the president
Ambassador to Japan	Kenneth R. Weinstein	PA	March 18, 2020	January 3, 2021	Nomination returned to the president
Ambassador to Qatar	Eric Wendt	PA	September 22, 2020	January 3, 2021	Nomination returned to the president
Alternate Representative for Special Political Affairs in the United Nations (with the rank of ambassador)	Alex N. Wong	PA	February 25, 2020	January 3, 2021	Nomination returned to the president
Ambassador to Canada	Aldona Wos	PA	February 25, 2020	January 3, 2021	Nomination returned to the president

== See also ==
- List of ambassadors appointed by Joe Biden
- List of ambassadors nominated by Donald Trump (2025–2029)
