= List of ambassadors of the United States to Tuvalu =

Ambassador of the United States to Tuvalu
- Seal of the United States Department of State

- Flag of a United States ambassador

- Incumbent; Christina Cavallo; Chargé d'affaires since August 9, 2026
- Nominator: The president of the United States
- Inaugural holder: John Peter Condon as Ambassador Extraordinary and Plenipotentiary
- Formation: September 20, 1979
- Website: U.S. Embassy - Suva

The United States ambassador to Tuvalu is the official representative of the government of the United States to the government of Tuvalu. The ambassador is concurrently the ambassador to Fiji, Kiribati, Nauru, and Tonga, while residing in Suva, Fiji.

== Ambassadors ==
Name	Title	Appointed	Presented credentials	Terminated mission	Notes
John Peter Condon – Career FSO	Ambassador Extraordinary and Plenipotentiary	March 2, 1978	April 11, 1978	July 27, 1980	
William Bodde – Political appointee	Ambassador Extraordinary and Plenipotentiary	June 30, 1980	August 12, 1980	August 15, 1981	
Fred J. Eckert – Political appointee	Ambassador Extraordinary and Plenipotentiary	February 11, 1982	February 25, 1982	May 7, 1984	
Carl Edward Dillery – Career FSO	Ambassador Extraordinary and Plenipotentiary	September 27, 1984	November 1, 1984	July 15, 1987	
Leonard Rochwarger – Political appointee	Ambassador Extraordinary and Plenipotentiary	September 28, 1987	March 11, 1988	August 31, 1989	
Evelyn Irene Hoopes Teegan – Political appointee	Ambassador Extraordinary and Plenipotentiary	October 10, 1989	November 21, 1989	March 5, 1993	
Robert Woltz Skiff – Career FSO	Chargé d'Affaires ad interim	June 1995	Unknown	December 19, 1995	
Don Lee Gevirtz – Political appointee	Ambassador Extraordinary and Plenipotentiary	December 19, 1995	February 2, 1996	September 28, 1997	
M. Osman Siddique – Political appointee	Ambassador Extraordinary and Plenipotentiary	August 9, 1999	September 13, 1999	June 30, 2001	
Ronald Keith McMullen – Career FSO	Chargé d'Affaires ad interim	June 30, 2001	Unknown	June 2002	
Hugh M. Neighbor – Career FSO	Chargé d'Affaires ad interim	June 2002	Unknown	January 9, 2003	
David L. Lyon – Career FSO	Ambassador Extraordinary and Plenipotentiary	November 15, 2002	January 9, 2003	July 23, 2005	
Larry Miles Dinger – Career FSO	Ambassador Extraordinary and Plenipotentiary	June 27, 2005	August 23, 2005	July 5, 2008	
C. Steven McGann – Career FSO	Ambassador Extraordinary and Plenipotentiary	October 6, 2008	November 24, 2008	July 13, 2011	
Frankie A. Reed – Career FSO	Ambassador Extraordinary and Plenipotentiary	August 4, 2011	October 30, 2011	January 18, 2015	
Judith Beth Cefkin – Career FSO	Ambassador Extraordinary and Plenipotentiary	December 11, 2014	May 12, 2015	February 25, 2018	Confirmed November 19, 2014
Michael B. Goldman – Career FSO	Chargé d'Affaires ad interim	February 25, 2018	N/A	December 23, 2019	
Joseph Cella	Ambassador Extraordinary and Plenipotentiary	September 26, 2019	December 23, 2019	January 20, 2021	Confirmed September 17, 2019
Tony Greubel	Chargé d'Affaires ad interim	January 20, 2021	N/A	November 23, 2022	
Marie C. Damour	Ambassador Extraordinary and Plenipotentiary	August 4, 2022	February 15, 2023	January 16, 2026	
John Degory	Chargé d'Affaires ad interim	January 17, 2026	N/A	July 6, 2026	
Christina Cavallo – Career FSO	Chargé d'Affaires ad interim	August 9, 2026		Present	

== See also ==
- Tuvalu – United States relations
- Foreign relations of Tuvalu
- Ambassadors of the United States
