= John Peter Condon =

American diplomat (1920–2011)

John P. Condon
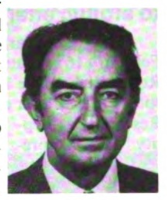

United States Ambassador to Fiji
- In office March 2, 1978 – July 27, 1980
- President: Jimmy Carter
- Preceded by: Armistead Inge Selden
- Succeeded by: William Bodde

United States Ambassador to Tonga
- In office September 20, 1979 – July 27, 1980
- President: Jimmy Carter
- Preceded by: Armistead Inge Selden
- Succeeded by: William Bodde

United States Ambassador to Tuvalu
- In office September 20, 1979 – July 27, 1980
- Preceded by: Inaugural holder
- Succeeded by: William Bodde

Personal details
- Born: August 6, 1920 Tulsa, Oklahoma, U.S.
- Died: November 22, 2011 (aged 91) Auxerre, France
- Education: University of Chicago, Columbia University, National and Kapodistrian University of Athens

John Peter Condon (August 6, 1920 – November 22, 2011) was an American diplomat who served as the first U.S. Ambassador to Tuvalu from 1979 to 1980.

== Early life and career ==
John Peter Condon was born in Tulsa, Oklahoma, on August 6, 1920. Both of his parents were Greek immigrants. Condon lived in Greece with his mother and brother from 1926 until 1945, when his family was repatriated with assistance from the U.S. Department of State. He attended the University of Chicago, Columbia University, and the University of Athens. He received a master's degree in sociology from Columbia University and a doctorate of law from the University of Athens.

Condon worked at the Greek American Chamber of Commerce in New York from 1948 to 1950, then worked for the Unemployment Compensation Office for one year. He was subsequently appointed to the U.S. Army Corps of Engineers as a labor relations officer. The Corps built secret bases in Morocco amid fears that the Soviet Union would expand its influence in Europe during the Korean War. In this position, he worked closely with Mahjoub Ben Seddik of the Moroccan Workers' Union. While in Casablanca, Condon married Nancy Fleischman. After leaving Casablanca, he worked as an international labor officer with the U.S. Air Force.

== State Department and ambassadorships ==
Condon joined the U.S. Department of State as a Foreign Service Officer in 1961.

In his early career, he served as a labor officer in Tunis, Algiers, Saigon, and Beirut, beginning his assignment in Algiers shortly after Algeria gained independence. His position was regional, and he served as labor attaché for Tunisia, Algeria, and Libya.

His Beirut assignment was also regional, covering Syria, Bahrain, Qatar, Yemen, Egypt, and Saudi Arabia. His time in Saigon came shortly after the assassination of Ngo Dinh Diem during the Vietnam War. From 1970 to 1977, Condon served as labor attaché at the U.S. Embassy in Paris. He also taught at the Industrial College of the Armed Forces beginning in 1977.

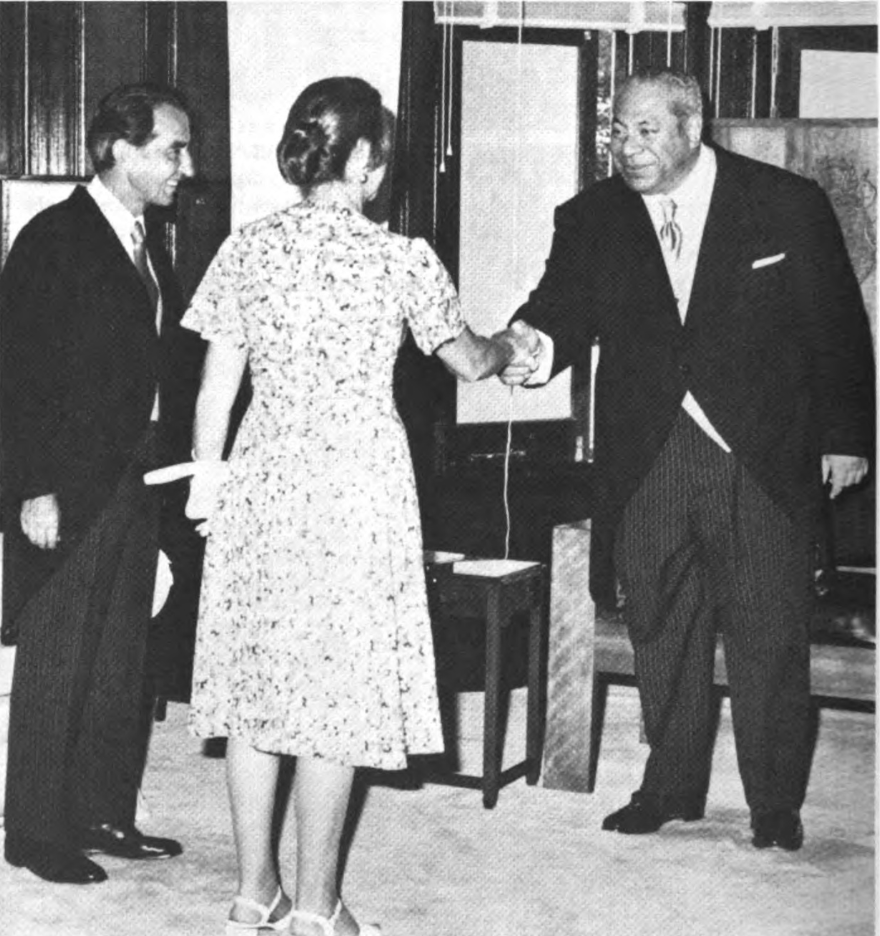
Ambassador John Condon and his wife Nancy Condon meet Tongan King Tāufaʻāhau Tupou IV

Condon spoke English, Greek, French, German, and Arabic. He learned Arabic in 1966 in preparation for his Middle East assignment.

He later served as U.S. Ambassador to Fiji, Tonga, and Tuvalu concurrently, while also being the U.S. representative on the South Pacific Commission, residing in Suva as the first resident U.S. ambassador in Fiji.

Condon’s appointment as ambassador to Tuvalu came one year after the United States recognized the country’s independence in 1978.

The embassy’s consular district was the largest in the Foreign Service at the time, covering Fiji, Tonga, Tuvalu, the New Hebrides, French Polynesia, Kiribati, and New Caledonia.

Condon was optimistic about interracial and interethnic cooperation upon leaving Fiji, though this optimism was later challenged when the 1987 Fijian coups d'état occurred due to tensions between Indigenous Fijians and Indo-Fijians.

== Retirement and death ==
Condon retired in November 1980. He received several awards during his State Department career, including the Meritorious Honor Award and the Superior Honor Award. He also received a decoration for exceptional civilian service from the U.S. Air Force, the Order of Social Merit from France, and the Gallantry Cross from the President of South Vietnam.

Condon died in Auxerre, France, on November 22, 2011, at the age of 91.
