= List of ambassadors of the United States to Nauru =

Ambassador of the United States to Nauru
- Seal of the United States Department of State

- Flag of a United States ambassador

- Incumbent; Christina Cavallo; Chargé d'affaires since August 9, 2026
- Nominator: The president of the United States
- Appointer: The president; with Senate advice and consent
- Inaugural holder: Marshall Green as Ambassador Extraordinary and Plenipotentiary
- Formation: February 28, 1974
- Website: U.S. Embassy - Suva

The United States ambassador to Nauru is the official representative of the government of the United States to the government of Nauru. The ambassador is concurrently the ambassador to Fiji, Kiribati, Tonga, and Tuvalu, while residing in Suva, Fiji.

== Ambassadors ==
Name	Title	Appointed	Presented credentials	Terminated mission	Notes
Marshall Green – Career FSO	Ambassador Extraordinary and Plenipotentiary	February 28, 1974	October 26, 1974	July 31, 1975	
James Ward Hargrove – Political appointee	Ambassador Extraordinary and Plenipotentiary	February 4, 1976	April 20, 1976	March 9, 1977	
Philip Henry Alston – Political appointee	Ambassador Extraordinary and Plenipotentiary	May 17, 1979	August 13, 1979	January 23, 1981	
Robert Dean Nesen – Political appointee	Ambassador Extraordinary and Plenipotentiary	June 17, 1981	November 20, 1981	May 2, 1985	
Laurence W. Lane Jr. – Political appointee	Ambassador Extraordinary and Plenipotentiary	December 6, 1985	October 17, 1987	April 29, 1989	
Melvin Floyd Sembler – Political appointee	Ambassador Extraordinary and Plenipotentiary	October 10, 1989	June 14, 1990	February 28, 1993	
Don Lee Gevirtz – Political appointee	Ambassador Extraordinary and Plenipotentiary	December 19, 1995	April 24, 1996	September 28, 1997	
M. Osman Siddique – Political appointee	Ambassador Extraordinary and Plenipotentiary	August 9, 1999	October 19, 1999	June 30, 2001	
David L. Lyon – Career FSO	Ambassador Extraordinary and Plenipotentiary	November 15, 2002	August 11, 2004	July 23, 2005	
Larry Miles Dinger – Career FSO	Ambassador Extraordinary and Plenipotentiary	June 27, 2005	August 31, 2005	July 5, 2008	
C. Steven McGann – Career FSO	Ambassador Extraordinary and Plenipotentiary	October 6, 2008	November 24, 2008	July 13, 2011	
Frankie A. Reed – Career FSO	Ambassador Extraordinary and Plenipotentiary	August 4, 2011	July 16, 2012	January 18, 2015	
Judith Beth Cefkin – Career FSO	Ambassador Extraordinary and Plenipotentiary	December 11, 2014	August 12, 2015	February 25, 2018	
Michael B. Goldman – Career FSO	Chargé d'Affaires ad interim	February 25, 2018	N/A	December 23, 2019	
Joseph Cella	Ambassador Extraordinary and Plenipotentiary	Confirmed: September 17, 2019	December 23, 2019	January 20, 2021	
Tony Greubel	Chargé d'Affaires ad interim	January 20, 2021	N/A	November 23, 2022	
Marie C. Damour	Ambassador Extraordinary and Plenipotentiary	August 4, 2022	February 7, 2023	January 16, 2026	
John Degory	Chargé d'Affaires ad interim	January 17, 2026	N/A	July 6, 2026	
Christina Cavallo – Career FSO	Chargé d'Affaires ad interim	August 9, 2026		Present	

== See also ==
- Nauru–United States relations
- Foreign relations of Nauru
- Ambassadors of the United States
