= M. Osman Siddique =

American diplomat (born 1950)

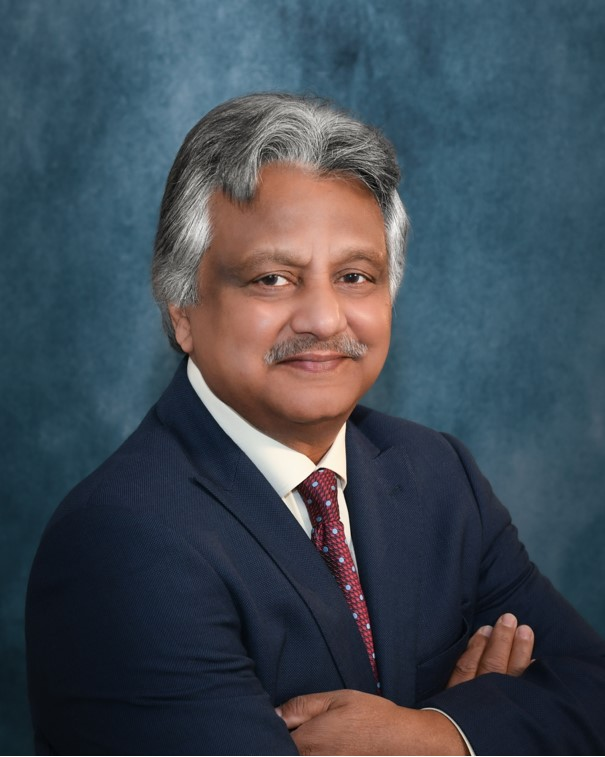
M. Osman Siddique

M. Osman Siddique (born 1950) is an American politician, former ambassador, and author. He served as the United States Ambassador to the Republic of Fiji and to the Republic of Nauru, to the Kingdom of Tonga and to Tuvalu from 1999 to 2001. He was the US ambassador during the 2000 Fijian coup d'état. Siddique is the first American Muslim to be appointed as an Ambassador from the United States.

== Background ==
In 1974, Siddique graduated with an Master of Business Administration from the Kelley School of Business at Indiana University Bloomington. In 1976 he formed ITI/Travelogue, Inc., a corporate travel management company, which the State Department said became "one of the top minority-owned businesses in the metropolitan Washington, D.C., area and one of the largest travel management companies in the nation." He served as its president and chief executive officer before entering public service. He was also a founding member of CorpNet International, which says it is "a consortium of domestic and international travel management companies, with revenues in excess of $1.5 billion."

Siddique is the son of the late Dr. Muhammad Osman Ghani, a former Vice Chancellor of Dhaka University, former Pakistan's Ambassador, and former Member of the Bangladesh Parliament. His brothers are Osman Yousuf a businessman and member of the Democratic National Committee and Dr. M. Osman Faruk a former Education Minister of Bangladesh.

== Public service ==
Siddique was nominated for the ambassadorship to Fiji and other Pacific nations by President Clinton on May 27, 1999. He was confirmed by the U.S. Senate on August 5, 1999, where he had been introduced by Republican senator John Warner. On August 17, 1999, he was sworn in as U.S. ambassador to the Republic of Fiji and to the Republic of Nauru, to the Kingdom of Tonga and to Tuvalu. According to the State Department, Siddique was "the first Muslim to be appointed to represent the United States abroad as an Ambassador. Following his swearing-in ceremony, Siddique said he believed he was the first American ambassador of the Islamic faith to take the oath of office with his hand on the Holy Qur'an. The Christian Bible is traditionally used to swear in US officials and Siddique said his wife, Catherine Mary Siddique, provided one for the ceremony." Siddique's use of the Quran and the Bible at his swearing in ceremony was made into a point of contention in 2006 during the Quran Oath Controversy of the 110th United States Congress.

In 2000 Siddique accompanied President Bill Clinton as the chief of protocol for his delegation on his trips to Bangladesh and India.

Siddique was a member of the Council of American Ambassadors where "He is at the forefront of discussions and policy debates towards greater understanding between US foreign policy and the Islamic world."

== The Fiji Coup of 2000 ==
Siddique was the American ambassador during the 2000 Fijian coup d'état; he was interviewed by Chris Masters of the Australian Broadcasting Company's Four Corners about the situation. Siddique told Masters that as the government was losing popular support, America tried to inform Mahendra Chaudhry of the situation, "I had tried to tell, and a lot of people tried to tell – publicly and privately – Mr. Chaudhry, you know, the sensitive nature of the situation. But I guess it falls on deaf ears." Siddique stated that at one point America, alongside other countries offered to intervene, "We offered some assistance but it was rejected on the grounds that Fiji would like to resolve its problem its own way ... I don't want to go into details but it included hostage negotiation teams and training, etc." Siddique announced the economic implications of the coup, saying that "Investment in Fiji will not take place unless democracy is re-established in the country ... Neither the people nor the private sector wants a future in which investors exist in a fortified island surrounded by seas of misery. Democracy gives us a chance to avoid that future ... I want more American investments in Fiji but before any American dollar can come in, you have to make sure that the commercial environment is fair and not exposed to undue risks."

Saturday, July 8, 2000, the US government recalled Siddique, announcing "recalled to the United States for consultations with the United States government regarding the crisis in Fiji", and that the US deplores "both hostage taking and efforts to deny political rights to citizens of Fiji ... [protests] the appointment of an unelected government by the military, even if composed of civilians ... [and notes] the absence of any Indo-Fijians or women in the interim administration".

== Political campaigns ==
In 2004 Siddique campaigned on behalf of John Kerry for president. His appearances included speaking at an event to rally Asian Americans in Washington DC, and appearing at a Pompano Beach Masjid in an effort to rally American-Muslims to the Democratic ticket. Lablu Ansar, writing for the Weekly Thikana, wrote that at these events Siddique "vehemently criticized the continuous repression of the Muslim community and stated that true believers of Islam wouldn't engage in terrorism. He also told the audience that the time had come for the Muslim community to unite and vote collectively for John Kerry. He also urged the Asian community to do the same. Siddique told the group that the Democratic Party was a true friend of the Asian community and that he [being made an ambassador] was an example of that friendship".

== Letter on 9/11 anniversary ==
In 2006 on the anniversary of the September 11, 2001, attacks Siddique wrote an editorial for the Washington Times. In the editorial he condemned ethnic and religious profiling and called American Muslims to action, saying "Too many American Muslims hold back from publicly speaking out against extremist ideologies that threaten us all because they fear being stigmatized by their coreligionists for cooperating with security agencies."

== See also ==
- Ambassador Zalmay Khalilzad, Muslim-American.

== Sources ==
Diplomatic posts
Preceded by Don Lee Gevirtz	United States Ambassador to Fiji; 1999–2001	Succeeded by Ronald Keith McMullen
Preceded by Don Lee Gevirtz	United States Ambassador to Nauru; 1999–2001	Succeeded by David L. Lyon
Preceded by Don Lee Gevirtz	United States Ambassador to Tonga; 1999–2001	Succeeded by David L. Lyon
Preceded by Don Lee Gevirtz	United States Ambassador to Tuvalu; 1999–2001	Succeeded by David L. Lyon
