= List of ambassadors of the United States to Kiribati =

Ambassador of the United States to Kiribati
- Seal of the United States Department of State

- Flag of a United States ambassador

- Incumbent; Christina Cavallo; Chargé d'affaires since August 9, 2026
- Nominator: President of the United States
- Inaugural holder: William Bodde as Ambassador Extraordinary and Plenipotentiary
- Formation: September 26, 1980
- Website: U.S. Embassy - Suva

The United States ambassador to Kiribati is the official representative of the government of the United States to the government of Kiribati. The ambassador is concurrently the ambassador to Fiji, Nauru, Tonga, and Tuvalu, while residing in Suva, Fiji.

== Ambassadors ==
Name	Title	Appointed	Presented credentials	Terminated mission	Notes
William Bodde – Career FSO	Ambassador Extraordinary and Plenipotentiary	September 26, 1980	January 20, 1981	August 15, 1981	
Fred J. Eckert – Political appointee	Ambassador Extraordinary and Plenipotentiary	February 11, 1982	May 31, 1982	May 7, 1984	
Carl Edward Dillery – Career FSO	Ambassador Extraordinary and Plenipotentiary	September 27, 1984	January 29, 1985	July 15, 1987	
Leonard Rochwarger – Political appointee	Ambassador Extraordinary and Plenipotentiary	September 28, 1987	May 9, 1988	August 31, 1989	
Evelyn Irene Hoopes Teegan – Political appointee	Ambassador Extraordinary and Plenipotentiary	October 10, 1989	January 18, 1990	March 5, 1993	
Joan M. Plaisted – Career FSO	Ambassador Extraordinary and Plenipotentiary	December 19, 1995	April 9, 1996	July 28, 2000	
Michael James Senko – Career FSO	Ambassador Extraordinary and Plenipotentiary	December 28, 2000	April 10, 2001	August 2, 2003	
David L. Lyon – Career FSO	Ambassador Extraordinary and Plenipotentiary	October 7, 2003	November 18, 2003	July 23, 2005	
Larry Miles Dinger – Career FSO	Ambassador Extraordinary and Plenipotentiary	June 27, 2005	September 1, 2005	July 5, 2008	
C. Steven McGann – Career FSO	Ambassador Extraordinary and Plenipotentiary	October 6, 2008	November 24, 2008	July 13, 2011	
Frankie A. Reed – Career FSO	Ambassador Extraordinary and Plenipotentiary	August 4, 2011	April 30, 2012	January 18, 2015	
Judith Beth Cefkin – Career FSO	Ambassador Extraordinary and Plenipotentiary	December 11, 2014	February 23, 2015	February 25, 2018	
Michael B. Goldman – Career FSO	Chargé d'Affaires ad interim	February 25, 2018		November 25, 2019	
Joseph Cella	Ambassador Extraordinary and Plenipotentiary	Confirmed: September 17, 2019	December 23, 2021	January 20, 2021	
Tony Greubel	Chargé d'Affaires ad interim	January 20, 2021	N/A	November 23, 2022	
Marie C. Damour	Ambassador Extraordinary and Plenipotentiary	August 4, 2022	November 30, 2022	January 16, 2026	
John Degory	Chargé d'Affaires ad interim	January 17, 2026	N/A	July 6, 2026	
Christina Cavallo – Career FSO	Chargé d'Affaires ad interim	August 9, 2026		Present	

== See also ==
- Kiribati – United States relations
- Foreign relations of Kiribati
- Ambassadors of the United States
