= Judith Beth Cefkin =

American diplomat (born 1953)

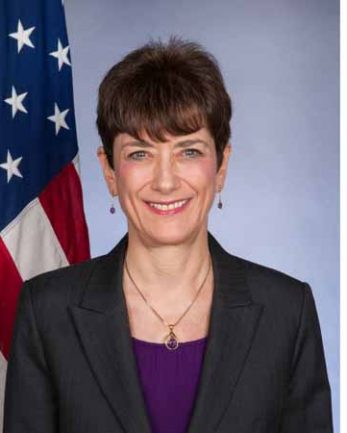

15th United States Ambassador to Fiji
- In office February 3, 2015 – February 25, 2018
- President: Barack Obama; Donald Trump
- Preceded by: Frankie A. Reed
- Succeeded by: Joseph Cella

12th United States Ambassador to Kiribati
- In office February 23, 2015 – February 25, 2018
- President: Barack Obama; Donald Trump
- Preceded by: Frankie A. Reed
- Succeeded by: Joseph Cella

13th United States Ambassador to Nauru
- In office August 12, 2015 – February 25, 2018
- President: Barack Obama; Donald Trump
- Preceded by: Frankie A. Reed
- Succeeded by: Joseph Cella

15th United States Ambassador to Tonga
- In office April 22, 2015 – February 25, 2018
- President: Barack Obama; Donald Trump
- Preceded by: Frankie A. Reed
- Succeeded by: Joseph Cella

13th United States Ambassador to Tuvalu
- In office May 12, 2015 – February 25, 2018
- President: Barack Obama; Donald Trump
- Preceded by: Frankie A. Reed
- Succeeded by: Joseph Cella

Personal details
- Born: 1953 (age 72–73) Colorado, U.S.
- Spouse: Paul Boyd
- Education: Smith College; London School of Economics

Judith Beth Cefkin (born in 1953) is an American diplomat and former ambassador to five nations in Oceania. She served concurrently as the ambassador to Fiji, Kiribati, Nauru, Tonga, and Tuvalu, while in residence in Suva, Fiji.

== Early life and education ==
Cefkin was born in New York to Rose (née) Mackanick and John Leo Cefkin. She grew up in Ft. Collins, Colorado, where her father was a professor of political science at Colorado State University. Cefkin attended Smith College, where she earned a B.A. in government in 1975. She then studied at the London School of Economics and Political Science, earning a master's degree in International Relations in 1977.

== Career ==
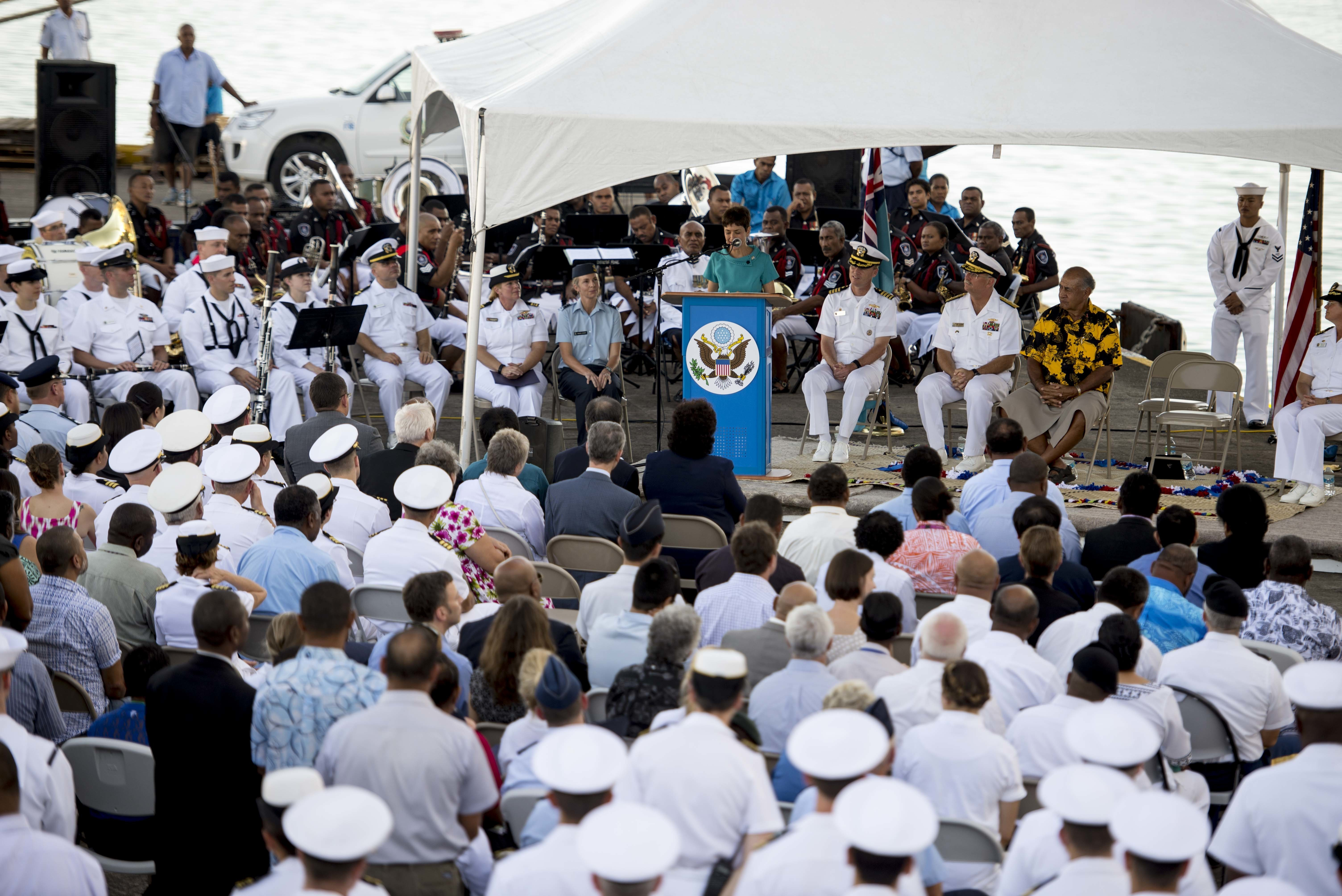
Ambassador Judith Cefkin speaks as USNS Mercy arrives at Suva Port, Fiji

After completing graduate studies, Cefkin became a television news producer. She worked as a legislative intern in Washington, D.C. and also worked in the Office of Technology Assessment for Congress.

In 1983 Cefkin embarked on a career in the Foreign Service. Her assignments have included ones in Thailand, France, Mexico and The Philippines. She served as deputy chief of mission at the U.S. Embassy in Bangkok.

She was nominated by President Barack Obama as ambassador to Fiji, Kiribati, Nauru, Tonga, and Tuvalu on July 9, 2014. Her nomination was confirmed by the Senate on November 19, 2014. She presented her credentials in the five nations between February and August 2015, and served until February 25, 2018.

== Personal life ==
Cefkin is married to Paul Boyd, a foreign service officer who has also served as a police officer and member of the U.S. Special Forces.

In addition to English she speaks French, Thai, Bosnian and Spanish.

Diplomatic posts
Preceded by Frankie A. Reed	United States Ambassador to Fiji; 2015–2018	Succeeded by Michael B. Goldman; Chargé d’Affaires ad interim
