= Frankie A. Reed =

American diplomat (born 1954)

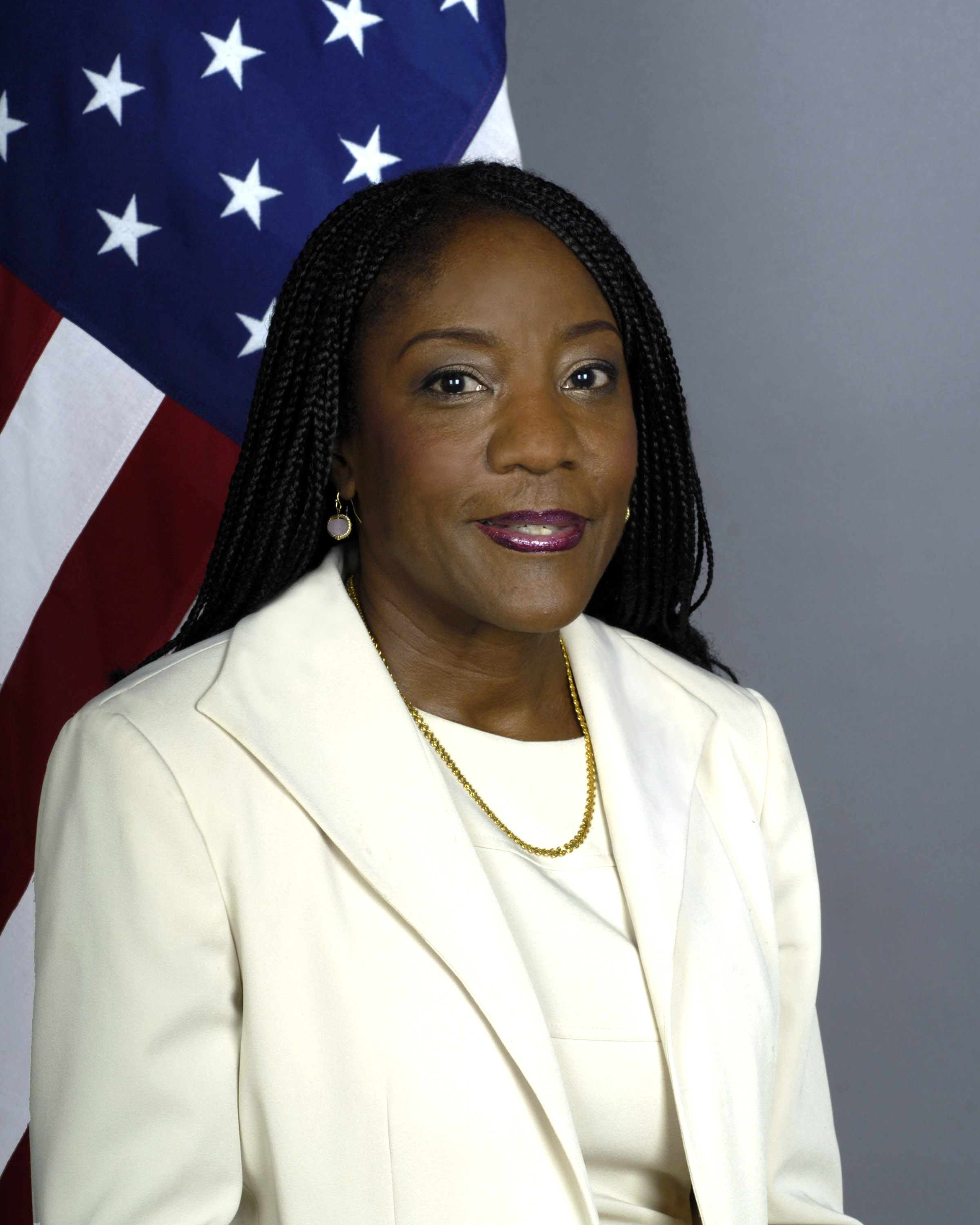

United States Ambassador to Fiji
- In office October 13, 2011 – January 18, 2015
- President: Barack Obama
- Preceded by: C. Steven McGann
- Succeeded by: Judith Beth Cefkin

United States Ambassador to Kiribati
- In office April 30, 2012 – January 18, 2015
- President: Barack Obama
- Preceded by: C. Steven McGann
- Succeeded by: Judith Beth Cefkin

United States Ambassador to Nauru
- In office July 16, 2012 – January 18, 2015
- President: Barack Obama
- Preceded by: C. Steven McGann
- Succeeded by: Judith Beth Cefkin

United States Ambassador to Tuvalu
- In office October 30, 2011 – January 18, 2015
- President: Barack Obama
- Preceded by: C. Steven McGann
- Succeeded by: Judith Beth Cefkin

United States Ambassador to Tonga
- In office November 14, 2011 – January 18, 2015
- President: Barack Obama
- Preceded by: C. Steven McGann
- Succeeded by: Judith Beth Cefkin

Personal details
- Born: Francesca Annette Reed; 1954 (age 71–72)
- Occupation: Diplomat

Frankie Annette Reed (born 1954, Baltimore) is an American diplomat. She is an Adjunct Senior Fellow at the East-West Center. She was appointed United States Envoy to the Pacific Islands Forum in March 2023. She retired from the Department of State following an appointment as United States Consul-General in Melbourne. From 2011 to 2015 she was the United States Ambassador to Fiji, Kiribati, Nauru, Tonga, and Tuvalu. She has a BA in journalism from Howard University and a doctorate in law from the University of California, Berkeley.

Before her appointment as ambassador, Reed was a deputy assistant secretary in the Bureau of East Asian and Pacific Affairs, responsible for relations with Australia, New Zealand and the Pacific Islands. She was previously a lecturer and diplomat-in-residence at the University of California at Berkeley.

== Career ==
Reed was deputy chief of mission in Apia, Samoa, from 1999 to 2002, and then in Conakry, Guinea from 2003 to 2005. From 2005 to 2008 she was consul general and deputy U.S. observer to the Council of Europe and the European Court of Human Rights in Strasbourg, France.

She has also been deputy director in the Office of Australia, New Zealand and Pacific Island Affairs, political section chief in Dakar, Senegal and a political officer in Nairobi, Kenya and in Yaounde, Cameroon.Frankie A. Reed arrived in Melbourne in March 2015 to assume the position of Consul General at the U.S. Consulate General Melbourne.

Diplomatic posts
Preceded by C. Steven McGann	United States Ambassador to Kiribati; 2011–2015	Succeeded by Judith Beth Cefkin
Preceded by C. Steven McGann	United States Ambassador to Nauru; 2011–2015	Succeeded by Judith Beth Cefkin
Preceded by C. Steven McGann	United States Ambassador to Tonga; 2011–2015	Succeeded by Judith Beth Cefkin
Preceded by C. Steven McGann	United States Ambassador to Fiji; 2011–2015	Succeeded by Judith Beth Cefkin
Preceded by C. Steven McGann	United States Ambassador to Tuvalu; 2011–2015	Succeeded by Judith Beth Cefkin
