= Larry Miles Dinger =

American diplomat

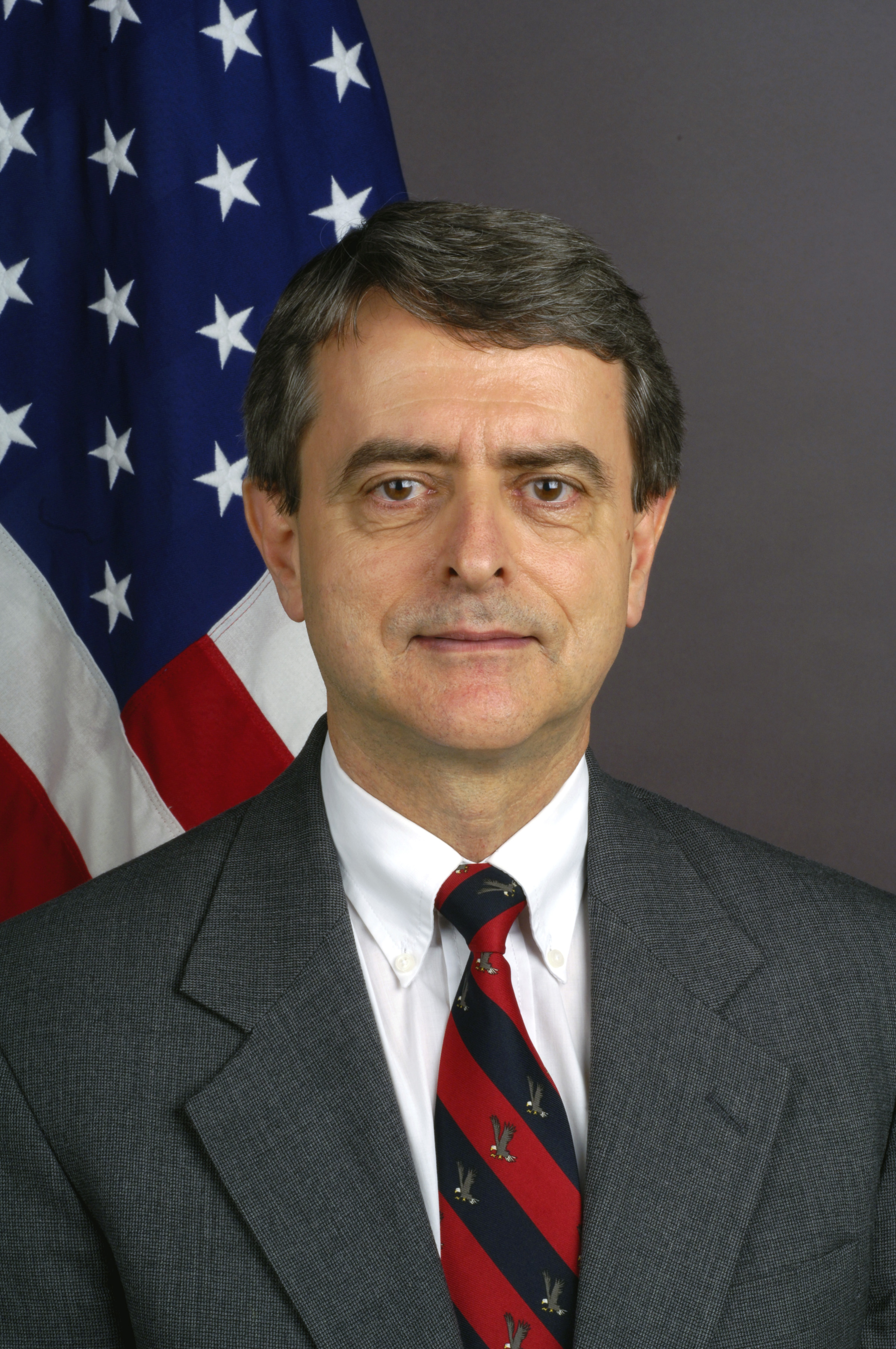

United States Ambassador to Burma
- In office September 9, 2008 – August 2011 (Chargé d'Affaires)
- President: George W. Bush; Barack Obama
- Preceded by: Shari Villarosa
- Succeeded by: Michael Thurston

United States Ambassador to Fiji
- In office June 27, 2005 – July 5, 2008
- President: George W. Bush
- Preceded by: David L. Lyon
- Succeeded by: C. Steven McGann

United States Ambassador to Kiribati
- In office June 27, 2005 – July 5, 2008
- President: George W. Bush
- Preceded by: David L. Lyon
- Succeeded by: C. Steven McGann

United States Ambassador to Nauru
- In office June 27, 2005 – July 5, 2008
- President: George W. Bush
- Preceded by: David L. Lyon
- Succeeded by: C. Steven McGann

United States Ambassador to Tonga
- In office June 27, 2005 – July 5, 2008
- President: George W. Bush
- Preceded by: David L. Lyon
- Succeeded by: C. Steven McGann

United States Ambassador to Tuvalu
- In office June 27, 2005 – July 5, 2008
- President: George W. Bush
- Preceded by: David L. Lyon
- Succeeded by: C. Steven McGann

United States Ambassador to Micronesia
- In office November 26, 2001 – August 2, 2004
- President: George W. Bush
- Preceded by: Diane Watson
- Succeeded by: Suzanne K. Hale

Personal details
- Born: 1946 (age 79–80)
- Education: Macalester College (B.A., 1968); Harvard Law School (J.D., 1975)

Larry Miles Dinger (born 1946) was the U.S. chargé d'affaires to Burma from 2008 to August 2011. Since the United States did not accredit a formal United States Ambassador to Burma from 1990 to 2012, the chargé d'affaires was the chief of mission and the most senior official in the embassy.

== Early life ==
Dinger grew up in Riceville, Iowa He is a graduate of Macalester College (BA magna cum laude 1968), Harvard Law School (JD cum laude 1975), and the National War College (MA 2000). After graduating from Macalester College in 1968, Dinger entered the Naval Officer Candidate School, Newport, Rhode Island, and was commissioned as a Navy "line" officer in April 1969. He first served in Nha Be, Vietnam. His then served in the Fleet Operations Control Center Europe in London, England, from 1970 to 1972.

After the Navy and law school, Dinger worked in politics from 1975 to 1980, including on the 1976 Udall for President campaign, on U.S. Senator John Culver's Judiciary Committee staff, and as a candidate for State Representative in his home state of Iowa. He practiced law in 1981–82 as a sole practitioner in Riceville, Iowa, before entering the Foreign Service in 1983.

== Diplomatic career ==
In his early career, Dinger served as Special Assistant to the Assistant Secretary of State for East Asian and Pacific Affairs (1995–96), political officer at Embassy Canberra (1992–95), Indonesia Desk Officer (1990–92), political officer at Embassy Jakarta (1987–1990), Staff Assistant in the EAP Bureau (1985–86), and consular/narcotics affairs officer at Embassy Mexico City (1983–85).

Dinger was Deputy Chief of Mission at Embassy Suva, Fiji (1996–99); was at the National War College in Washington, D.C. (1999–2000), and was Deputy Chief of Mission at Embassy Kathmandu, Nepal (2000–2001).

He was U.S. ambassador to the Federated States of Micronesia (2001–2004) during final negotiations of the 2nd Compact of Free Association. From August 2004 to June 2005, he was the State Department's Senior Advisor to the Naval War College in Newport, Rhode Island. His duties included mentoring the Foreign Service officers studying at the Naval War College, teaching a course on "strategy," and serving as liaison on political/military issues between Naval War College personnel and the State Department.

Dinger was U.S. Ambassador to the Republic of the Fiji Islands, the Republic of Kiribati, the Republic of Nauru, the Kingdom of Tonga, and Tuvalu from July 2005 to July 2008.

While serving as Chief of Mission at Embassy Rangoon, Burma, from 2008 to 2011, Dinger oversaw the beginning of a new diplomatic relationship as Burmese politics began to thaw, including with the release of Aung San Suu Kyi from house arrest.

After retirement from the Foreign Service in 2011, Dinger worked from 2012 to 2013 as leader of an inspection team in the State Department Office of the Inspector General. Subsequently, since 2013, he has been the East Asia and Pacific Bureau's Senior Advisor at the U.S. Mission to the United Nations each autumn. He also served as acting Ambassador to ASEAN in Jakarta for four months in 2014 and as acting DCM at U.S. Embassy Bangkok for three months in 2016.

Larry Dinger and his brother, John, are the first career Foreign Service Officer siblings to become ambassadors. Larry became ambassador to the Federated States of Micronesia in December 2001 when his brother John was ambassador to Mongolia.

Diplomatic posts
Preceded by Shari Villarosa	Chargés d’Affaires to Burma; 2008–2011	Succeeded by Michael Thurston
Preceded by Diane Watson	U.S. Ambassador to Micronesia; 2002–2004	Succeeded by Suzanne Hale
Preceded by David L. Lyon	United States Ambassador to Nauru; 2005–2008	Succeeded by C. Steven McGann
Preceded by David L. Lyon	United States Ambassador to Tonga; 2005–2008	Succeeded by C. Steven McGann
Preceded by David L. Lyon	United States Ambassador to Kiribati; 2005–2008	Succeeded by C. Steven McGann
Preceded by David L. Lyon	United States Ambassador to Fiji; 2005–2008	Succeeded by C. Steven McGann
Preceded by David L. Lyon	United States Ambassador to Tuvalu; 2005–2008	Succeeded by C. Steven McGann
