= Nauru–United States relations =

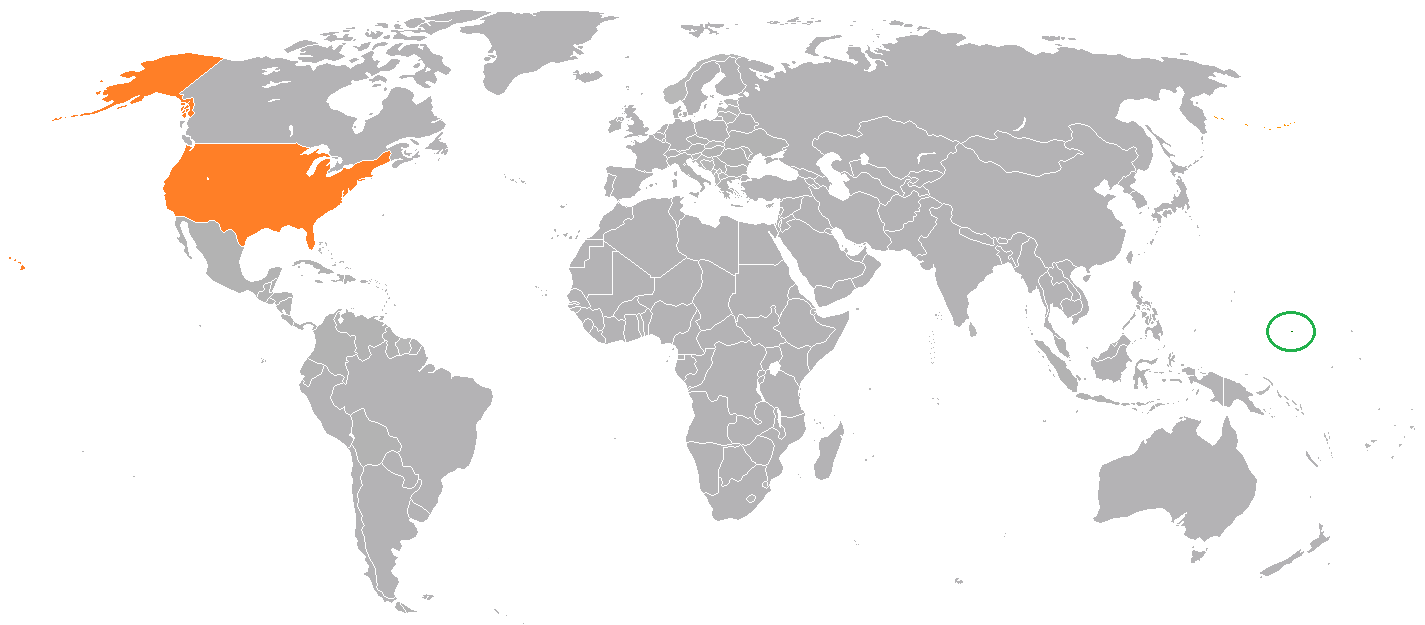

- Nauru: United States

Nauru–United States relations are the bilateral relations of Nauru and the United States The U.S. has no consular or diplomatic offices in Nauru. Officers of the American Embassy in Suva, Fiji, are concurrently accredited to Nauru and make periodic visits.

In September 2007, then Foreign Minister of Nauru, David Adeang, visited Cuba. On this occasion, he made a number of public statements in relation to the United States. He extolled Cuba and criticized US foreign policy, during a visit to the Caribbean island. Subsequently, the United States Department of State, referring to events investigated in 2007, reported criticism of Adeang in its Human Rights Report, issued for 2008. This criticism was included in the State Department's report, despite the fact that police, having undertaken an investigation of allegations of wrongdoing, made no attempt to prosecute Adeang. Shortly after Adeang's public pronouncements, a crisis, with himself at the center, led to the collapse of the President of Nauru Ludwig Scotty's government.

On December 3, 2020, the US Ambassador Joseph Cella hosted Nauruan High Commissioner Michael Aroi at the US Embassy in Suva where they signed a Nauru-United States Investment Incentive Agreement. The agreement will establish a framework through which a full range of investment support offered by the U.S. International Development Finance Corporation (DFC).
