= National Catholic Prayer Breakfast =

American yearly religious event

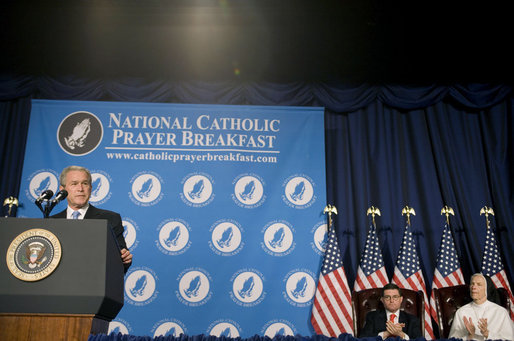
President George W. Bush addresses the National Catholic Prayer Breakfast in Washington, D.C., April 13, 2007.

The National Catholic Prayer Breakfast is an annual lay prayer event and banquet that takes place in Washington, D.C. It was created in response to Pope John Paul II's call for a new evangelization, and involves a keynote speaker each year.

According to progressive Catholic commentator Fr Thomas J. Reese SJ "The conservative tilt of the NCPB has led some Catholics to call on it to change its name to the National Republican Prayer Breakfast."

== History ==
It was established in 2004 and its "founding circle" members included Joseph Cella, Leonard Leo, and Rick Santorum, among others. It connected prominent Catholic politicians and representatives of the Catholic clergy, businessmen, political and religious activists.

Similar to the more established National Prayer Breakfast, it has attracted notable political speakers to discuss the issues of the day facing modern Christians. It featured President George W. Bush as a keynote speaker in the 2005, 2006, 2007, and 2008 assemblies.

Archbishop Raymond Leo Burke delivered the keynote address at the 2009 prayer breakfast, which also featured Supreme Court Justice Antonin Scalia as guest speaker. House Speaker Paul Ryan spoke at the 2016 National Catholic Prayer Breakfast event.

The 2020 event was held virtually, and honored US Attorney General William Barr with the organization's Christifideles Laici Award. The Sisters of St. Joseph of Carondelet; and the Respect Life Office of the Archdiocese of Santa Fe were among a number of Catholic organizations protesting the award to Barr, who reinstated the federal death penalty. A federal execution was conducted the day before the breakfast, and another scheduled on the day after. Others who opposed the group's honoring Barr included representatives of Pax Christi and the Franciscan Action Network. The Association of U.S. Catholic Priests "accused Barr of showing "disrespect for sacred space when he was party to a recent show of force to enable the President to use the grounds and building of an Episcopal Church in Lafayette Square to hold up a bible in front of the church as a prop for a political photo op."

The 2021 event is set to feature Bishop Steven J. Lopes, head of the Personal Ordinariate of the Chair of Saint Peter.

In 2025, Vice President JD Vance, who converted to Catholicism in 2019, attended the event.
