= Marie C. Damour =

American diplomat

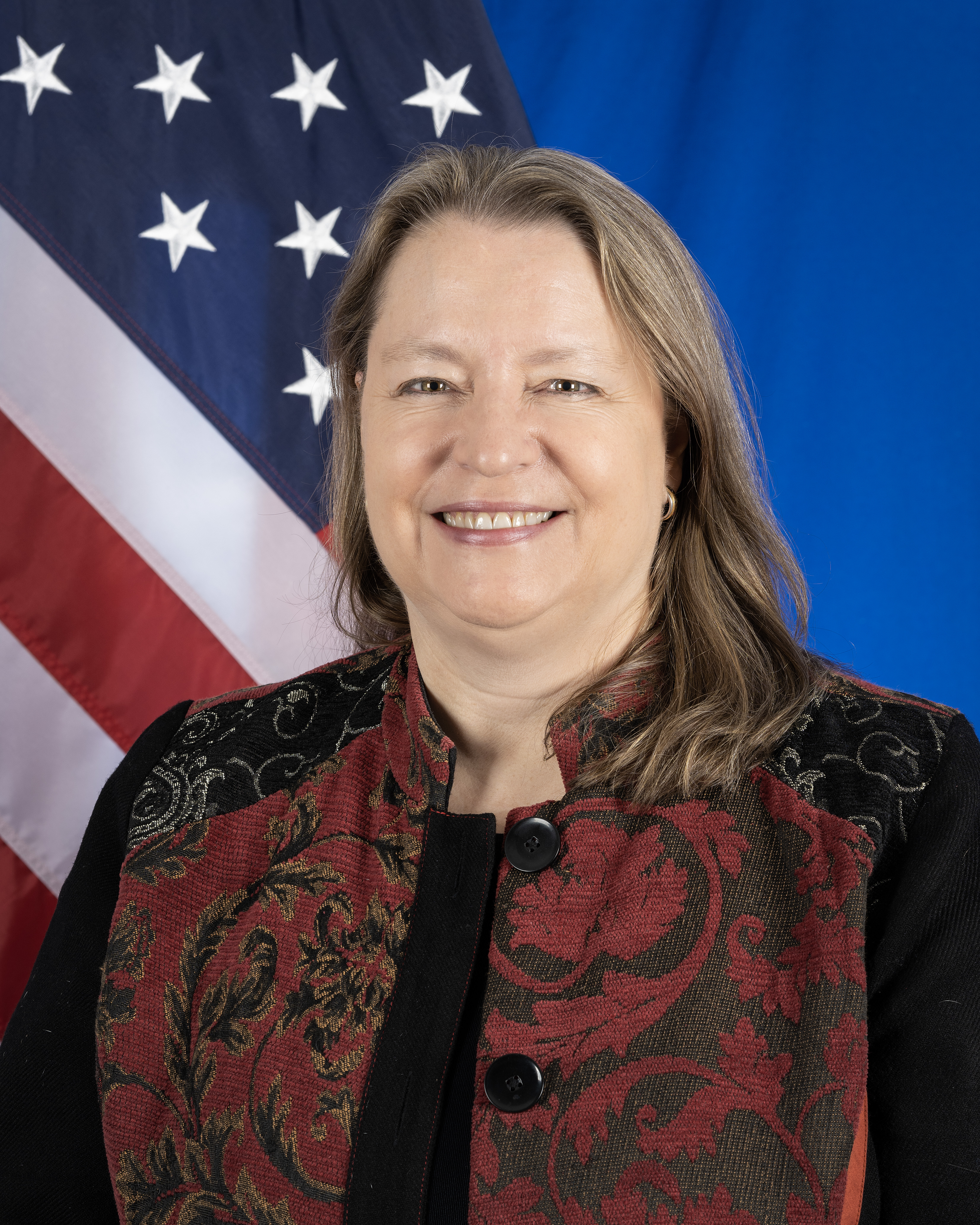

United States Ambassador to Fiji
- In office November 24, 2022 – January 16, 2026
- President: Joe Biden; Donald Trump
- Preceded by: Joseph Cella

United States Ambassador to Kiribati
- In office November 30, 2022 – January 16, 2026
- President: Joe Biden; Donald Trump
- Preceded by: Joseph Cella

United States Ambassador to Tonga
- In office December 6, 2022 – January 16, 2026
- President: Joe Biden; Donald Trump
- Preceded by: Joseph Cella

United States Ambassador to Nauru
- In office February 8, 2023 – January 16, 2026
- President: Joe Biden; Donald Trump
- Preceded by: Joseph Cella

United States Ambassador to Tuvalu
- In office February 15, 2023 – January 16, 2026
- President: Joe Biden; Donald Trump
- Preceded by: Joseph Cella

United States Consul General to Ho Chi Minh City
- In office August 2019 – August 2022
- President: Donald Trump; Joe Biden

Personal details
- Education: College of William and Mary (BA)
- Marie C. Damour's voice Damour's opening statement at her confirmation hearing to be United States ambassador to Fiji, Kiribati, Nauru, Tonga and Tuvalu; Recorded July 13, 2022

Marie C. Damour is an American diplomat who had served Ambassador to Fiji, serving concurrently as the ambassador to Kiribati, Nauru, Tonga, and Tuvalu. She previously served as Consul General of the U.S. Consulate General in Ho Chi Minh City, Vietnam.

== Early life and education ==
Damour earned her B.A. from the College of William and Mary.

== Career ==
Damour is a career member of the Senior Foreign Service, with the rank of Minister-Counselor. Her positions within the Department of State include the Director of the Office of Maritime Southeast Asian Affairs in the State Department's Bureau of East Asia and Pacific Affairs; Director of the Office of Policy Coordination and Public Affairs in the State Department's Bureau of Consular Affairs; and the Deputy Chief of Mission, as well as Chargé d'Affaires ad interim at the U.S. Embassy in Wellington, New Zealand. She also served as Minister Counselor for Consular Affairs at the U.S. Embassy in Brasilia, Brazil; the Chief of Non-Immigrant Visa Services, and then Chief of Visa Services at the U.S. Embassy in London, England; the Consular Chief at the U.S. Embassy in Baghdad, Iraq, and the U.S. Consulate General in Ho Chi Minh City, Vietnam.

=== Ambassador to Fiji ===
On May 25, 2022, President Joe Biden nominated Damour to be the United States Ambassador to Fiji, Kiribati, Nauru, Tonga and Tuvalu. Hearings on her nomination were held before the Senate Foreign Relations Committee on July 13, 2022. The committee favorably reported her nomination on July 19, 2022. On August 4, 2022, her nomination was confirmed by the full United States Senate via voice vote. Damour presented her credentials to President of Fiji Ratu Wiliame Katonivere on November 24, 2022, President of Kiribati Taneti Maamau on November 30, 2022, King of Tonga Tupou VI on December 6, 2022, President of Nauru Russ Kun on February 8, 2023, and Governor-General of Tuvalu Tofiga Vaevalu Falani on February 15, 2023.

== Personal life ==
Damour speaks French, Vietnamese, and Portuguese.

Diplomatic posts
Preceded by Joseph Cella	United States Ambassador to Fiji; 2022–present	Incumbent
Preceded by Joseph Cella	United States Ambassador to Kiribati; 2022–present	Incumbent
Preceded by Joseph Cella	United States Ambassador to Tonga; 2022–present	Incumbent
Preceded by Joseph Cella	United States Ambassador to Nauru; 2023–present	Incumbent
Preceded by Joseph Cella	United States Ambassador to Tuvalu; 2023–present	Incumbent
