= C. Steven McGann =

American diplomat

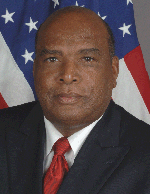

United States Ambassador to Fiji
- In office November 24, 2008 – July 13, 2011
- President: George W. Bush; Barack Obama
- Preceded by: Larry Miles Dinger
- Succeeded by: Frankie A. Reed

United States Ambassador to Kiribati
- In office November 24, 2008 – July 13, 2011
- President: George W. Bush; Barack Obama
- Preceded by: Larry Miles Dinger
- Succeeded by: Frankie A. Reed

United States Ambassador to Nauru
- In office November 24, 2008 – July 13, 2011
- President: George W. Bush; Barack Obama
- Preceded by: Larry Miles Dinger
- Succeeded by: Frankie A. Reed

United States Ambassador to Tonga
- In office November 24, 2008 – July 13, 2011
- President: George W. Bush; Barack Obama
- Preceded by: Larry Miles Dinger
- Succeeded by: Frankie A. Reed

United States Ambassador to Tuvalu
- In office November 24, 2008 – July 13, 2011
- President: George W. Bush; Barack Obama
- Preceded by: Larry Miles Dinger
- Succeeded by: Frankie Reed

Personal details
- Born: Clarence Steven McGann; June 28, 1951 New York City, New York, U.S.
- Died: May 24, 2023 (aged 71) Arlington, Virginia, U.S.
- Occupation: Diplomat; Academic

Clarence Steven McGann (June 28, 1951 – May 24, 2023) was an American diplomat who served as the United States Ambassador to Fiji, Kiribati, Nauru, Tonga, and Tuvalu from 2008 to 2011. He was nominated by President George W. Bush, and assumed his duties at post in October 2008.

Ambassador McGann served as the Senior Advisor of the Dwight D. Eisenhower School for National Security and Resource Strategy at the National Defense University (NDU) in Washington, D.C. The Eisenhower School prepares select military, civilian and international fellows for strategic leadership. He was previously the Vice Chancellor of the College of International Security Affairs (CISA) at NDU (2011–2014), focusing on building global partnerships. McGann continues as a CISA Adjunct Professor. He was a Senior Foreign Service Officer with the rank of Minister-Counselor (FE-MC).

McGann was assigned as Chargé d'Affaires (ad interim) of the United States Embassy in Dili, Timor-Leste (2014). McGann was the United States Ambassador to the Republics of Fiji, Nauru, Kiribati, and the Kingdom of Tonga and Tuvalu (2008–2011). His achievements centered on democracy-building, law enforcement cooperation, maritime security, humanitarian assistance, disaster response and the largest expansion of U.S. diplomatic presence in the Pacific with the construction of Embassy Suva as a regional hub post. Overseas assignments include Taiwan, Zaire, South Africa, Australia, and Kenya.

McGann was Director of the Office for Australian, New Zealand and Pacific Island Affairs in the Bureau for East Asian and Pacific Affairs (2006–2008). He developed a framework for strengthening relations with Australia and renewing coordination with New Zealand. McGann launched a series of negotiations that led to ship-rider agreements with eight Pacific Island Countries and the U.S. Coast Guard to prevent unlicensed commercial fishing and protect local economies. He also served as a Senior Adviser in the Bureau of East Asian and Pacific Affairs as an expert on North Korean human rights and refugee issues (2005–2006).

As Director for Asia and Near East in the Bureau of Population, Refugees, and Migration (2003–2005), he was responsible for oversight of $370 million in humanitarian assistance dispensed to international organizations and NGO partners to build home country capacity and reintegrate vulnerable populations throughout the region. McGann was South Asia Bureau Deputy Director for Pakistan, Afghanistan, and Bangladesh (2000–2002) and helped strengthen regional multilateral engagement. At the United States Mission to the United Nations (1998–2000), he negotiated the Security Council resolution to address monetary sanction efforts (UNSCR 1267). He also guided the UN Security Council resolution that endorsed Nelson Mandela as Special Envoy for Burundi and worked directly with the former South African President to determine his mandate (UNSCR 1286).

McGann earned a Bachelor of Arts from Claremont McKenna College (1973). He pursued graduate studies at Cornell University (1975–1978). McGann earned a Master of Science degree from the Industrial College of the Armed Forces, NDU (2003). He was a graduate of the Naval War College's Fourth Joint Force Maritime Commander Component Course (2007). He served as a member of the Board of Trustees at Claremont McKenna College. McGann was born in New York, New York and died in Arlington, Virginia.

== Source ==
Diplomatic posts
Preceded by Larry Miles Dinger	United States Ambassador to Nauru; 2008–2011	Succeeded by Frankie Reed
Preceded by Larry Miles Dinger	United States Ambassador to Tonga; 2008–2011	Succeeded by Frankie Reed
Preceded by Larry Miles Dinger	United States Ambassador to Kiribati; 2008–2011	Succeeded by Frankie Reed
Preceded by Larry Miles Dinger	United States Ambassador to Fiji; 2008–2011	Succeeded by Frankie Reed
Preceded by Larry Miles Dinger	United States Ambassador to Tuvalu; 2008–2011	Succeeded by Frankie Reed
