= Evelyn Hoopes Teegan =

American diplomat (born 1931)

Evelyn Irene Hoopes Teegan (born November 17, 1931, Muscatine County, Iowa) was a non-career appointee who served concurrent appointments as the American Ambassador Extraordinary and Plenipotentiary to Kiribati, Tuvalu, Fiji, and Tonga from November 21, 1989, to March 5, 1993.

A housewife from Edina, Minnesota, Teegan had served as a Republican National Committeewoman. She was Vice President of Teegan and Associates in Minneapolis since 1987. She graduated from Iowa State University in 1953.
