= Erik Bethel =

American financial professional

- Education: United States Naval Academy; University of Pennsylvania (MBA)
- Employer: Mare Liberum Fund
- Political party: Republican
- Spouse: Michelle Bethel
- Children: 3

Erik Bethel is a global finance professional with experience in the private and public sectors. He is currently a partner at Mare Liberum, a venture fund focused on investing in maritime technologies. In 2020, he was nominated to serve as the U.S. Ambassador to Panama. Previously, he was nominated by the president and confirmed unanimously by the Senate to represent the United States at the World Bank.

== Early life and education ==
Bethel grew up in Miami. His father was Paul Bethel, a career State Department official stationed in Cuba, Japan, and Germany. His mother is Diana Esperanza Gonzalez Estradé de Bethel. She was born in Havana, Cuba. Bethel graduated with distinction from the United States Naval Academy, where he was an Olmsted Scholar, a Cox Fund Scholar, and a battalion commander. Bethel later earned a Master of Business Administration from Wharton School of the University of Pennsylvania, where he was a Milken Scholar.

Bethel was featured on the Shawn Ryan podcast in November 2024 where he discussed his early life, professional experience, China, and national security.

== Career ==
Bethel is a financial professional in private equity and venture capital in the U.S., Latin America and Asia. Bethel began his career at Morgan Stanley in New York covering Brazil, Colombia, and Mexico. Subsequently, Bethel moved to Mexico City as an investment banker and then back to New York, where he joined J.P. Morgan's private equity division. In 2006, Bethel relocated to Shanghai, China, where he co-founded a financial firm called Sino-Latin Capital, was acquired by a division of Franklin Templeton. Bethel has served on the Board of Governors of Opportunity International, a non-profit organization that provides financial services to impoverished people in developing countries. Bethel serves on the International Advisory Council of Oxford Analytica, an advisor to Global SWF, a sovereign wealth fund analytics platform, a Trustee at the United States Naval War College, a Senior Fellow at the Center for Strategic and International Studies, a Distinguished Fellow at the Chamber of Digital Commerce, and a Committee Member at the US EXIM Bank."

== World Bank service ==
On November 21, 2017, President Trump announced his intent to nominate Bethel to a two-year term to represent the United States at the World Bank. On December 1, 2017, his nomination was sent to the Senate. On March 22, 2018, his nomination was confirmed 100-0 by voice vote. While at the World Bank, Bethel promoted several initiatives, such as artificial intelligence and blockchain, to streamline World Bank operations. He also focused on digital currencies while at the World Bank and afterwards.

Bethel gave a testimony to the US House Oversight committee related to concerns over Chinas influence in multilateral organizations in June 2024.

== Ambassadorship nomination ==
On April 20, 2020, President Donald Trump announced his intent to nominate Bethel to serve as the United States ambassador to Panama citing Bethel's fluency in Spanish and business experience in Latin America. On May 4, 2020, Trump sent his nomination to the Senate. Bethel's nomination passed unanimously through the Senate Foreign Relations Committee, but after the 2020 United States presidential election, the nomination returned to the Senate.

== Personal life ==
Bethel is married to Michelle Bethel (née Harp) and has three children. He speaks English, Spanish, Portuguese, and Mandarin.
