= William Bodde Jr. =

American diplomat (1931–2020)

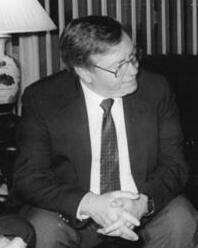
- Bodde in Washington, D.C., 1988

2nd United States Ambassador to the Marshall Islands
- In office June 27, 1990 – July 7, 1992
- President: George H. W. Bush
- Preceded by: Samuel B. Thomsen
- Succeeded by: David C. Fields

4th United States Ambassador to Fiji
- In office June 30, 1980 – August 15, 1981
- President: Jimmy Carter
- Preceded by: John Peter Condon
- Succeeded by: Fred J. Eckert

4th United States Ambassador to Tonga
- In office June 30, 1980 – August 15, 1981
- President: Jimmy Carter
- Preceded by: John Peter Condon
- Succeeded by: Fred J. Eckert

2nd United States Ambassador to Tuvalu
- In office June 30, 1980 – August 15, 1981
- President: Jimmy Carter
- Preceded by: John Peter Condon
- Succeeded by: Fred J. Eckert

1st United States Ambassador to Kiribati
- In office June 30, 1980 – August 15, 1981
- President: Jimmy Carter
- Preceded by: Position established
- Succeeded by: Fred J. Eckert

Personal details
- Born: November 27, 1931 Brooklyn, New York, U.S.
- Died: May 26, 2020 (aged 88) Bethesda, Maryland, U.S.
- Party: Democratic
- Spouse: Ingrid Bodde (1954-2003, deceased)
- Children: Barbara (1948-2009, deceased), Peter William Bodde, Christopher Scott Bodde, four grandchildren and three great grandchildren
- Education: Hofstra College; Johns Hopkins University
- Profession: Diplomat

Military service
- Branch/service: United States Army
- Years of service: 1950–54
- Battles/wars: served in Germany during the Korean War

William Bodde Jr. (November 27, 1931 – May 26, 2020) was an American diplomat. He was the United States Ambassador to the Marshall Islands (1992 - 1995), Fiji, Tonga, Tuvalu, and Kiribati (1980 - 1981). He was a career member of the Senior Foreign Service, Class of Minister-Counselor. He was also the first executive director of the Asia Pacific Economic Cooperation (APEC), establishing the international secretariat for the organization in Singapore. He was active for over thirty years as an American diplomat and was a senior advisor to Jimmy Carter, Ronald Reagan, and George H. W. Bush. He was also an experienced writer and lecturer on foreign affairs. He is survived by his sons Peter William Bodde and Christopher Scott Bodde, four grandchildren, and three great grandchildren.

== Biography ==
=== Early life, military career and education, 1931-1962 ===
William Bodde Jr. was born on November 27, 1931, in Brooklyn, New York to William Bodde, Snr. and Georgiana Bodde. He was raised in Huntington, Long Island. He joined the U.S. Army in 1950 and served in Germany until 1954. On January 16, 1954, he married Ingrid Oberle Gropp. In 1951, he graduated from Hofstra College with a B.A. in political science and history. He became a Civil Servant in 1961 at the US Housing and Home Finance Agency. He joined the U.S. Foreign Service in 1962 and graduated from Johns Hopkins University (School of Advanced International Studies (M.P.P.A., 1967)).

=== Career in State Department, 1962-1994 ===
Upon joining the Foreign Service, Bodde became a political officer and Special Assistant to the Ambassador in Vienna, Austria, from 1962 to 1965. From 1965 to 1966, he was a public information officer at the U.S. Department of State. He became a political officer in Stockholm, Sweden, from 1967-1970 and was the desk officer for Sweden and Finland in the Department of State from 1970 to 1972. Bodde also served as Senate Liaison Officer in Berlin, Germany, (1973-1974), and Chief of the Internal Political Section in Bonn, Germany, (1974-1977). He again served as a political officer in to Office of Papua New Guinea and Pacific Islands at the Department of State (1977-1978).

In 1978 Bodde became the director of the Office of Pacific Islands Affairs at the Department of State, and retained that position until 1980; from 1980 to 1981 he was appointed by Jimmy Carter as Ambassador to Fiji, Tonga, Tuvalu and Kiribati, serving simultaneously. He was later a diplomat in residence for the East–West Center in Hawaii from 1982 to 1983. He then returned to Germany as a consul general in Frankfurt (1983 - 1986). He served as Deputy Assistant Secretary for European and Canadian Affairs at the Department of State from 1986 to 1989. From 1989 until his appointment as Ambassador to the Marshall Islands he was the dean for senior seminar at the Foreign Service Institute at the Department of State in Washington, DC.

On June 27, 1990, George H. W. Bush appointed William Bodde Jr. as United States Ambassador to the Marshall Islands. He presented his credentials to Amata Kabua, then President of the Marshall Islands, on August 6, 1990. He served until his termination of mission on June 28, 1992. He worked in the Policy Planning Office of the Bureau of Oceans, Environment, and Science at the Department from 1992 until 1993. He retired from the service in 1994 after returning from Singapore.

In 1993 Bodde became the first executive director of the Asia Pacific Economic Cooperation, and in 1994 he authored View from the 19th floor: Reflections of the first APEC Executive Director, named so for his office on the 19th floor at Alexandria Point in Singapore. He was succeeded as director by Rusli Noor in 1994, when he formally retired.

=== Retirement and later life, 1994-2020 ===
William Bodde Jr. formally retired from the APEC and State Department in 1994. His wife Ingrid Bodde died on February 12, 2003, aged 75. He remained an active lecturer, writer for a number of newspapers in the United States and speaker on foreign and security affairs, diplomatic history, and economics, having lectured at numerous colleges and universities in the United States and abroad. He was the president and CEO of WBJ Associates and was an advisor to a number of Fortune 500 companies.

Diplomatic posts
Preceded by John P. Condon	United States Ambassador to Tonga; 1980–1981	Succeeded by Fred J. Eckert
Preceded by John P. Condon	United States Ambassador to Tuvalu; 1980–1981	Succeeded by Fred J. Eckert
Preceded by John P. Condon	United States Ambassador to Fiji; 1980–1981	Succeeded by Fred J. Eckert
Preceded by office established	United States Ambassador to Kiribati; 1980–1981	Succeeded by Fred J. Eckert
Preceded by Samuel B. Thomsen	United States Ambassador to the Marshall Islands; 1990–1992	Succeeded by David C. Fields
