= Fiji–United States relations =

- Fiji: United States

The bilateral relations between the Fiji and the United States have improved significantly since Fiji's elections in September 2014, which restored a democratically elected government to Fiji for the first time since 2006. The United States had opposed Fiji's unelected government, which came to power through a military coup in December 2006.

== History ==
=== Before the 2006 coup ===
In response to attacks by locals on American merchants operating in Fiji, the U.S. Navy launched punitive expeditions in 1855 and 1858.

Prior to Fiji becoming a British colony in 1874, the United States had maintained a consular presence there. The US recognized Fiji's independence in October 1970. Formal diplomatic relations, and the American Embassy at Suva, were established in 1971. Robert Woltz Skiff was Chargé d’Affaires ad interim in Fiji beginning November 1, 1971, when the Embassy was established.

On 2 March 2005, Prime Minister Laisenia Qarase strongly reacted to a U.S. State Department report criticizing Fiji for practicing racial discrimination, and for the racial divide between Fiji's two main political parties, the SDL (mostly indigenous Fijian) and the Fiji Labour Party (mostly Indo-Fijian). "Fiji can make a similar report on the US on all those issues. Our report would be far worse than the US State Department's report on Fiji," he said. He went on to rebuke the United States for interfering in Fiji's domestic affairs.

In an interview with the Fiji Times on 29 May 2005, America's outgoing Ambassador David Lyons renewed his country's criticism of Fijian policies by criticizing the Qarase government's proposed Reconciliation and Unity Commission. Lyons expressed concern that its provisions for amnesty for persons convicted of involvement in the coup d'etat that overthrew the elected government in 2000 would encourage further coups in the future. "If a democratic society doesn't make it clear that the violent over-throw of its elected leaders is a crime against that society, I have to think that it is inviting future upheaval," he said. He also condemned statements of public figures predicting coups if they, their party, or their race is not successful in the next parliamentary election, saying that such threats were "absolutely despicable in a free, democratic society" and constituted "the worst form of scaremongering."

Lyons said that the amnesty for perpetrators of the 1987 coups had been an error of judgement and had set a precedent which could negatively affect the future unless stopped now. He concurred with statements made by a number of Fijian politicians, including deposed Prime Minister Mahendra Chaudhry and Senator Adi Koila Nailatikau, that a coup culture had taken root in Fiji. He warned that tourism, which forms the mainstay of the Fijian economy, would be adversely impacted by any further instability. He believed, he said, that the Qarase government was sincere in its commitment to democracy, and acknowledged positive steps taken by the government to restore the rule of law. He added a word of caution, however: "All of these positive steps ... will vanish in an instant if there is another coup or sufficient political upheaval questioning the legitimacy of future elections."

On 12 July, however, Lyons cautioned the Fijian military against using the legislation as a pretext for a coup d'état. Their concern over the proposed law was understandable, he said, but it did warrant the overthrow of the government. "Extra constitutional action against a duly elected democratic government ... is unacceptable," he said. A coup would be detrimental not only to Fiji, but to the entire Pacific region, Lyons said.

=== After the 2006 coup ===
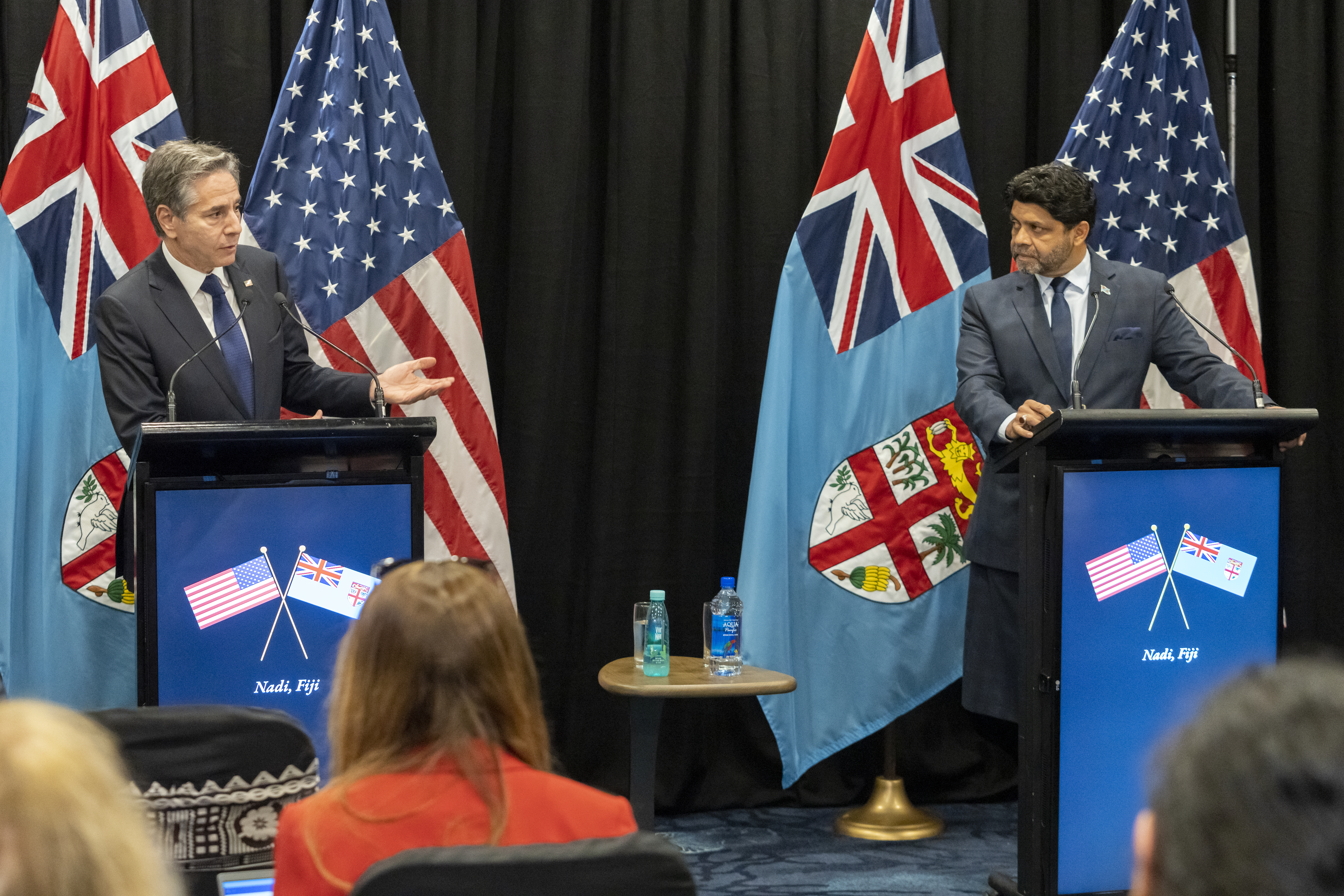
US Secretary of State Antony Blinken speaks to the press with Fijian Acting Prime Minister Aiyaz Sayed-Khaiyum in February 2022

The United States suspended $2.5 million in aid money pending a review of the situation, following the 2006 coup.

The United States did not recognized the interim government established by the country's December 5, 2006 coup. Although the United States provides relatively little direct bilateral development assistance, it contributes as a major member of a number of multilateral agencies such as the Asian Development Bank and the Pacific Community (SPC). The United States Peace Corps, temporarily withdrawn from Fiji in 1998, resumed its program in Fiji in late 2003.

Fiji's response to its deteriorating relations with the United States and other Western countries has been to turn to Asia for new political and economic partners. In July 2007, Fiji's Interim Finance Minister Mahendra Chaudhry outlined his country's "Look North" foreign policy:

"Fiji has friends in China, it has friends in Korea, it has friends in […] other Asian countries. We’re no longer relying on Australia and New Zealand. And in any event, the United States was not doing much for Fiji anyway."

The previous month, Interim Prime Minister Voreqe Bainimarama, the author of the 2006 coup, had called upon the international community to normalise its relations with Fiji, following his pledge to restore democracy by 2009.

In December 2007, one year after the coup, Fiji's embassy in Washington stated that it wished to promote "good relations between Fiji and the United States of America".

In May 2008, the United States embassy in Suva issued the following statement: "The United States continues to condemn the military coup and the Interim Government’s actions to suppress the freedom of speech of those in the media."

In October, Fiji's High Court ruled that the interim government was not illegal, as it had been appointed by the President, who had acted within the lawful provisions of his authority. Following the ruling, Fiji’s interim attorney-general, Aiyaz Sayed-Khaiyum, called upon Australia, New Zealand, the European Union and the United States to lift the sanctions they had imposed on the country, stating that they could no longer refuse to recognise the interim government. The United States government responded that it did not intend to alter its position, and that the "suspension of certain US assistance to the Fiji government under section 508 of the foreign operations appropriations act will remain in place, until the President or Secretary of State determines that Fiji has made measurable progress toward the restoration of democratic rule".

In April 2009, however, the Fiji High Court of Appeals overruled the original decision, stating instead that Bainimarama's coup was in fact unconstitutional and his post-coup regime is an illegal government. The court called for the Commander to step down and asked the President to appoint a new, interim prime minister caretaker (that was to be neither Commodore Bainimarama nor the former prime minister Qarase whom he overthrew) who would be in power until new elections could be held. The President responded by abrogating the constitution and illegally removing the judges and thereby, Fiji's judicial system as a whole. Bainimarama's government remains unrecognized by Australia, New Zealand, the EU, and the U.S. among others. In May, Fiji became the first nation to be removed from the Pacific Islands Forum for human rights abuses and is currently in danger of being removed from the Commonwealth as well.

The US recognized the 2014 and 2018 elections as "free and fair," and restored security and financial assistance following the 2014 elections.

In mid-December 2025, the United States Department of State threatened to downgrade Fiji to a "Tier 3" ranking in its Trafficking in Persons (TIP) report unless the Fijian government takes action against a South Korean religious cult called the Grace Road Church, which has been accused of human trafficking and forced labour. The threatened reclassification followed the escape of at least four US citizens including two children from the Grace Road Group.

== Diplomatic missions ==
The U.S. Embassy in Fiji is located in Suva. Fiji maintains an embassy in Washington, D.C., as well as a permanent mission in New York City at the United Nations. Fiji also maintains honorary consulates in Los Angeles, San Francisco, Chicago and Dallas.

Fiji's embassy to the United States is accredited to Canada and Mexico. The United States' embassy to Fiji is accredited to Kiribati, Nauru, Tonga and Tuvalu.

== See also ==
- Foreign relations of Fiji
- Foreign relations of the United States
