= Joseph Cella =

American diplomat and political advisor (born 1969)

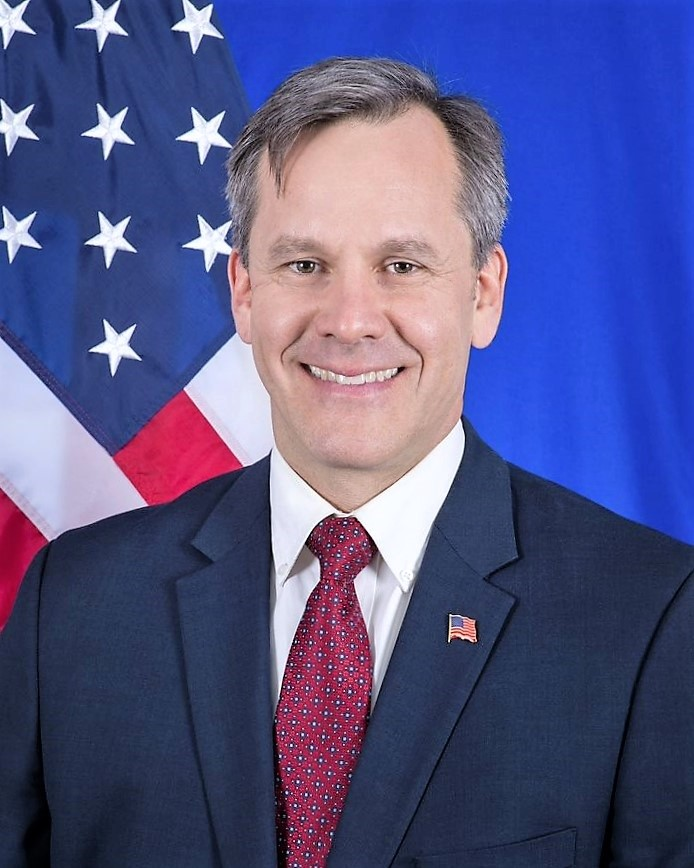
- Official portrait, 2019

United States Ambassador to Fiji
- In office December 23, 2019 – January 20, 2021
- President: Donald Trump
- Preceded by: Judith Beth Cefkin
- Succeeded by: Marie C. Damour

United States Ambassador to Kiribati
- In office December 23, 2019 – January 20, 2021
- President: Donald Trump
- Preceded by: Judith Beth Cefkin
- Succeeded by: Marie C. Damour

United States Ambassador to Nauru
- In office December 23, 2019 – January 20, 2021
- President: Donald Trump
- Preceded by: Judith Beth Cefkin
- Succeeded by: Marie C. Damour

United States Ambassador to Tonga
- In office December 23, 2019 – January 20, 2021
- President: Donald Trump
- Preceded by: Judith Beth Cefkin
- Succeeded by: Marie C. Damour

United States Ambassador to Tuvalu
- In office December 23, 2019 – January 20, 2021
- President: Donald Trump
- Preceded by: Judith Beth Cefkin
- Succeeded by: Marie C. Damour

Personal details
- Born: Joseph James Cella; November 14, 1969 (age 57) Richmond, Michigan, U.S.
- Spouse: Kristen Renee
- Children: 7
- Education: Hillsdale College (BA)

Joseph James Cella (/ˈsɛlə/ SELL-əh; born November 14, 1969) is an American diplomat and political advisor, who served concurrently as the United States Ambassador to Fiji, Kiribati, Nauru, Tonga, and Tuvalu from 2019 to 2021. A prominent Catholic, Cella co-founded the National Catholic Prayer Breakfast.

== Early life and education ==
Cella was born on November 14, 1969, to Robert Cella and Janice Jean Rose. He was raised in Richmond, Michigan, and graduated from Hillsdale College in 1991. At Hillsdale, he was a part of the Sigma Chi fraternity.

== Political career ==
Cella made his start in politics by managing two successful campaigns, and one failed campaign for three Republican Michigan state senators. He went on to work for Spencer Abraham as a political regional director in Michigan for five years. Cella next worked as a staff member in the Capitol Hill office of Thaddeus McCotter for two years, before becoming a senior adviser to the House Republican Steering Committee and the Republican Policy Committee.

During the 2016 United States presidential election, Cella was initially a conservative critic of Donald Trump's candidacy. Cella was one of several Catholic leaders to sign onto an open letter in March 2016, which “called Trump ‘manifestly unfit to be president of the United States,’ citing his “vulgarity,’ his appeals to racial and ethnic fears, and questioning his commitment to ending abortion.” He later said saying he had “a sincere change of heart and mind” when Trump said he would appoint anti-abortion judges in the mold of Antonin Scalia.

After Trump became the Republican nominee, Cella served as lead Catholic advisory counsel for the Trump campaign. After Trump's election, Cella served as part of Trump's transition team.

== Ambassador to Fiji (2019–2021) ==
=== Appointment ===
Cella was offered a White House position after the presidential transition was over, but he declined. Subsequently, Trump offered him an ambassadorship to either Malta, Uruguay, Slovenia, or Fiji. He chose Fiji.

After being nominated by Trump in February 2019, in September the U.S. Senate voted 56–38 to approve Cella as Ambassador to Fiji, and concurrently as Ambassador to Kiribati, Nauru, Tonga, and Tuvalu. He was sworn in on November 25, 2019.

=== Tenure ===
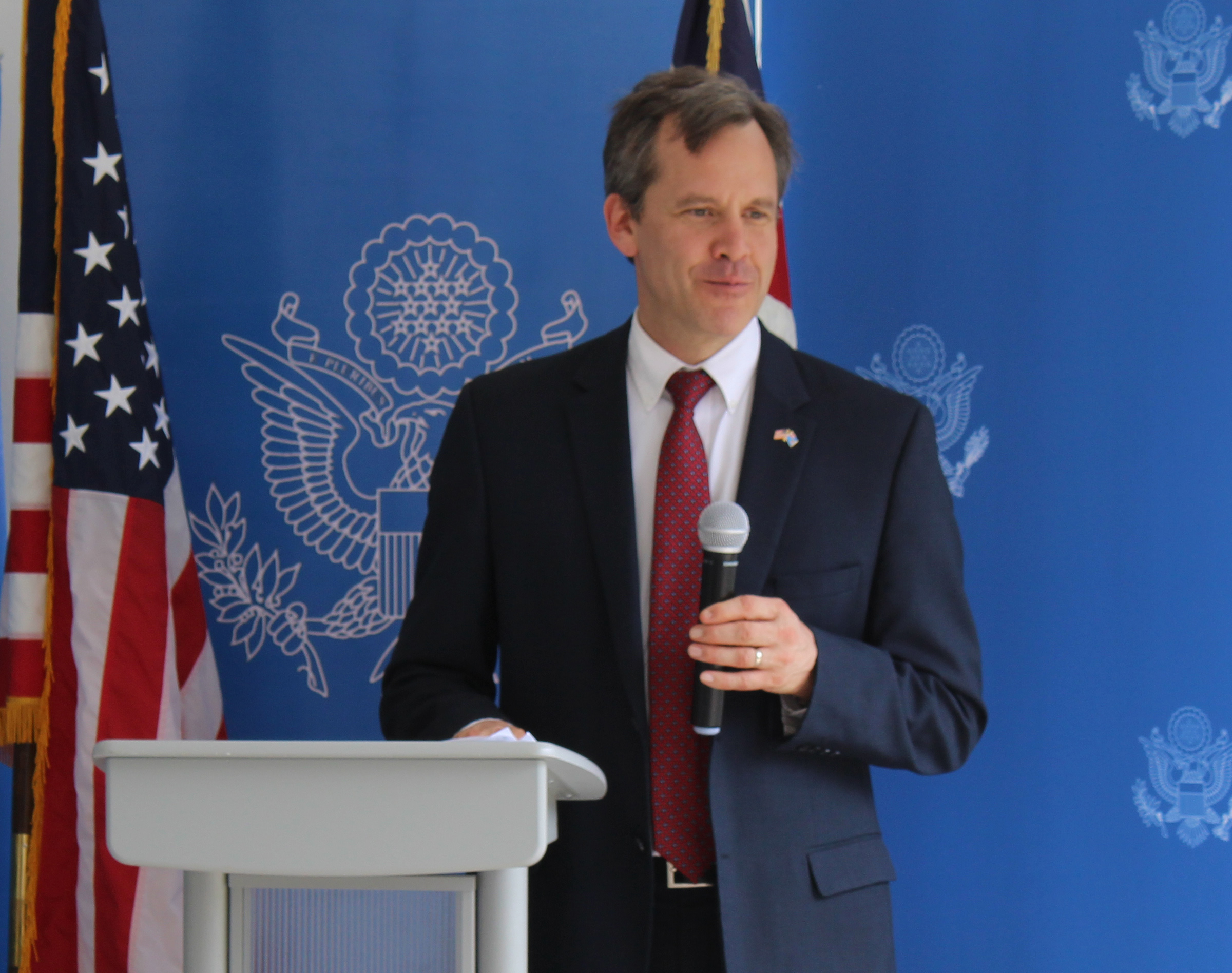
Joseph Cella's first press conference as Ambassador to Fiji

Cella was presented his credentials to be the 16th United States Ambassador to Fiji and its surrounding islands of Kiribati, Nauru, Tonga, and Tuvalu on December 23, 2019, by Fijian President Jioji Konrote.

He said his main priorities within his first 30 days was to be a "very active, aggressive bridge builder, and public engager". On January 30 of next year, Cella met with Joseph Lengyel, then a member of the Joint Chiefs of Staff, to "emphasize the importance of Fiji’s State Partnership Program with the Nevada National Guard".

Cella departed Fiji on January 20, 2021, after his resignation, leaving Tony Greubel as the chargé d’affaires.

=== COVID-19 pandemic ===
During the COVID-19 pandemic, Cella received an additional $27.7 million and relief supplies for his ambassadorial countries from the United States Agency for International Development (USAID).

Cella got Fiji's leading alcohol beverages manufacturer, Paradise Beverages (Fiji) Limited, to donate relief supplies to the Fijian community. General Manager of Paradise Beverages, Mike Spencer, said that "they were fortunate that the U.S. Embassy has come on board and contribute to this because if they did this themselves, they could not do it for long."

Cella had been involved in on the ground charity work, helping the Fijian Competition and Consumer Commission, during the pandemic. Cella's embassy had made donations to food banks that helped people, and families impacted by COVID-19.

In May 2020, Cella's Embassy requested grant proposals to try to "support economic resilience" in Fiji, Kiribati, Nauru, Tonga, and Tuvalu at the "grassroots level" during the COVID-19 pandemic. The grants were accepted on August 27, 2020.

In July 2020, Cella joined Government of Fiji officials to launch “Health Care on Air". A radio program that attempted to "boost the capacity of health workers to protect themselves, [against COVID-19] and deliver quality health services to communities."

== Personal life ==
Cella lives in Augusta Charter Township, Michigan outside of Ann Arbor with his wife Kristen Renee, and their seven children.

=== Religious work ===
Cella is a Catholic. In 2004, he founded the National Catholic Prayer Breakfast along with Rick Santorum, and Leonard Leo, which they created in response to Pope John Paul II's call for a new evangelization. It has featured many notable guest speakers like George W. Bush, John Roberts, Paul Ryan, Raymond Leo Burke, Samuel Alito, and Antonin Scalia.

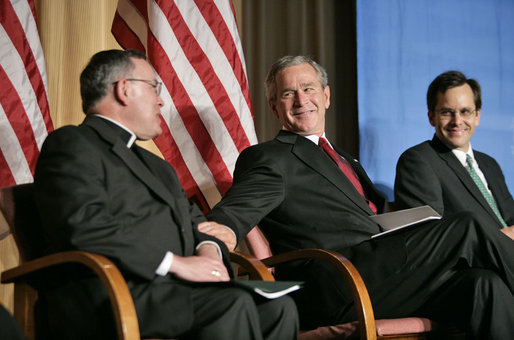
President George W. Bush (center), Archbishop Charles J. Chaput (left), and Joseph Cella (right) pictured at a National Catholic Prayer Breakfast in 2005

Cella co-founded the Catholic advocacy organization Catholic Vote. It has grown to over 700,000 members, as of 2019.

Diplomatic posts
Preceded by Judith Beth Cefkin	United States Ambassador to Fiji; 2019–2021	Succeeded by Marie C. Damour
Preceded by Judith Beth Cefkin	United States Ambassador to Kiribati; 2019–2021	Succeeded by Marie C. Damour
Preceded by Judith Beth Cefkin	United States Ambassador to Nauru; 2019–2021	Succeeded by Marie C. Damour
Preceded by Judith Beth Cefkin	United States Ambassador to Tonga; 2019–2021	Succeeded by Marie C. Damour
Preceded by Judith Beth Cefkin	United States Ambassador to Tuvalu; 2019–2021	Succeeded by Marie C. Damour
