= Carl Edward Dillery =

American diplomat (1930–2016)

- Born: December 17, 1930; Seattle, Washington, U.S.
- Died: January 23, 2016 (aged 85)
- Education: Seattle Pacific College, George Washington University
- Occupation: foreign service
- Years active: 1984–1987
- Known for: U.S. ambassador to Fiji, Tonga, Tuvalu and Kiribati
- Notable work: chair of the American Foreign Service Association’s (AFSA) Scholarship Committee

Carl Edward Dillery (December 17, 1930 – January 23, 2016) was the U.S. ambassador to Fiji, Tonga, Tuvalu and Kiribati (formerly known as the Gilbert Islands) (1984 to 1987) and chair of the American Foreign Service Association’s (AFSA) Scholarship Committee for 15 years (1997 to 2012) and retiree vice president from 1991 to 1993.

Dillery was born in Seattle, Washington. He graduated from Seattle Pacific College in 1953 with a bachelor's degree in history and earn a master's of science degree in the administration of national security from The George Washington University. After Seattle Pacific, he worked as an insurance examiner before joining the Foreign Service in 1955.
