= Don Lee Gevirtz =

American diplomat (1928–2001)

Don Lee Gevirtz (1928–2001) was a non-career appointee who served concurrent appointments as the Ambassador Extraordinary and Plenipotentiary to Tuvalu, Fiji, Nauru and Tonga from 1995 until 1997.

At the time of his nomination, Gevirtz was the chairman and chief executive officer of the Foothill Group Incorporated, Los Angeles financial services firm and was a big contributor to Bill Clinton.

Gevirtz is an honors graduate of the University of Southern California. He and his wife Marilyn endowed the Gevirtz Graduate School of Education at UCSB.

He died at the age of 73.
