= Michael B. Goldman =

American diplomat

Michael Goldman
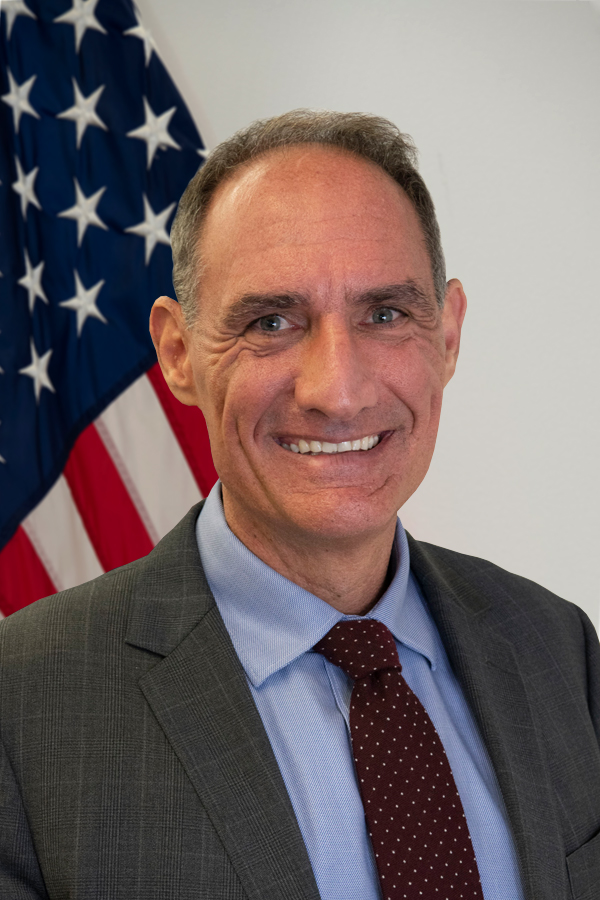

United States Ambassador to Turkey
- Chargé d'affaires ad interim
- In office September 1, 2024 – May 7, 2025
- President: Joe Biden; Donald Trump
- Preceded by: Jeff Flake
- Succeeded by: Tom Barrack

United States Ambassador to Australia
- Chargé d'affaires ad interim
- In office January 19, 2021 – July 25, 2022
- President: Donald Trump; Joe Biden
- Preceded by: Arthur Culvahouse
- Succeeded by: Caroline Kennedy

Personal details
- Spouse: Brett Jones
- Children: 3
- Education: Georgetown University (BA); University of California, Berkeley (MA, PhD)

Michael B. Goldman is an American diplomat who had served as the chargé d'affaires ad interim to Turkey. He had served as the chargé d'affaires ad interim to Australia between January 20, 2021, and July 25, 2022.

== Early life and education ==
Goldman earned an undergraduate degree in international politics from Georgetown University, followed by M.A. and Ph.D. degrees in political science from the University of California, Berkeley. He completed his dissertation research on a Fulbright Scholarship at the Universiti Sains Malaysia in Penang, Malaysia.

== Career ==
Goldman arrived in Canberra in March 2020 as Deputy Chief of Mission, after three years at the U.S Embassy in Suva, Fiji, where he served as Charge d'Affaires (2018–2019) with responsibility for relations with the nations of Fiji, Kiribati, Nauru, Tonga, Tuvalu.

Goldman joined the State Department in 2000. He recently served in Washington as Deputy and Acting Director for China and Mongolia in the Bureau of East Asian and Pacific Affairs (2015–2017). Previous assignments include Kathmandu (2012–2015), where he was Political and Economic Counselor; Hanoi (2008–2011) and Tashkent (2002–2005) as a political officer; and Taipei (2000–2002) as a consular officer, as well as an earlier stint on the China Desk (2005–2007). He's the recipient of several State Department honors, including recognition as the Department's outstanding human rights officer for his work to combat torture and safeguard vulnerable NGOs in Uzbekistan.

== Personal life ==
Goldman speaks Mandarin Chinese, and at one time or another has also been fluent in Nepali, Vietnamese, Russian, and Indonesian. He has three children and is married to USAID Foreign Service Officer Brett Jones.

Prior to joining the State Department, Goldman worked as a dock worker on an oyster farm in Puget Sound and as an adjunct professor of political science at San Francisco State University.
