= Laos–United States relations =

- Laos: United States

Relations between Laos and the United States officially began when the United States opened a legation in Laos in 1950, when Laos was a semi-autonomous state within French Indochina. These relations were maintained after Laos' independence in October 1953.

== Vietnam War–era ==
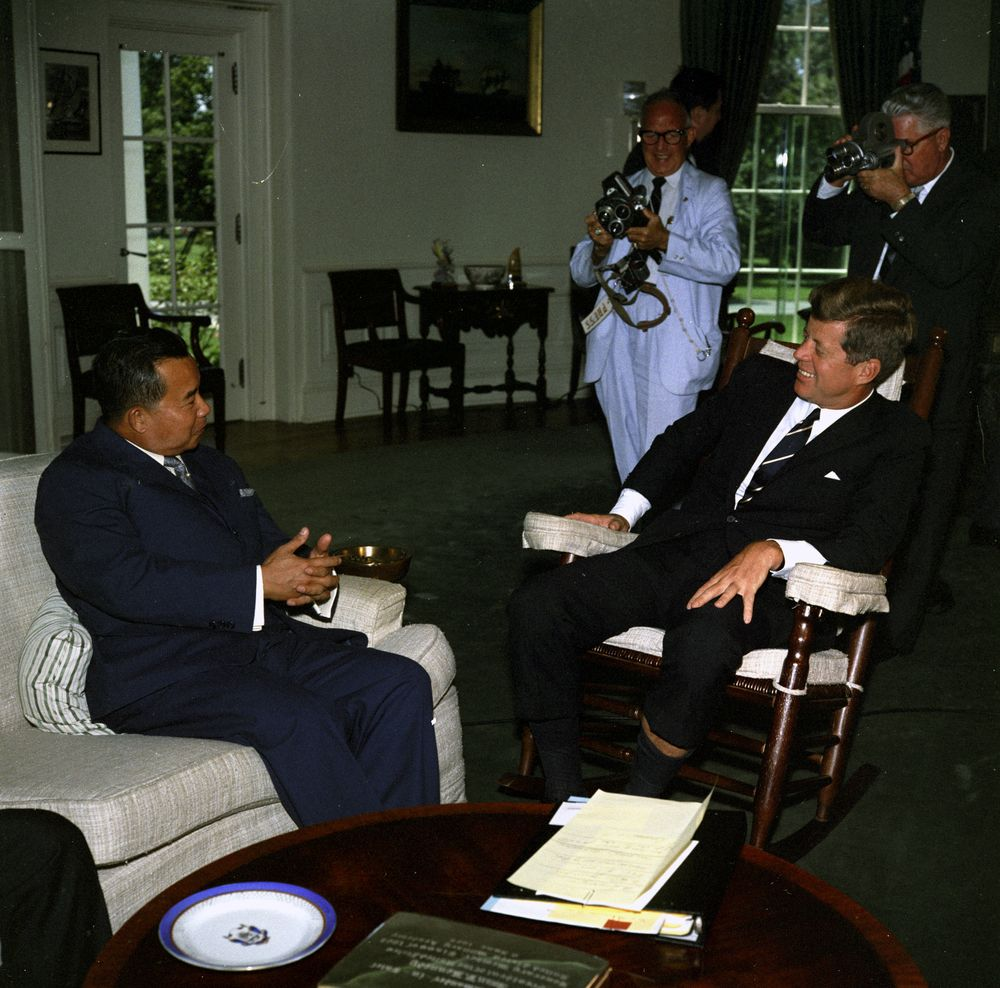
Prince Souvanna Phouma and President John F. Kennedy in 1962

The Second Indochina War (1955–1975) between the United States and communist forces in Indochina took place partially on Lao territory. The US became heavily involved, in a secret covert war, during the Laotian Civil War of 1953–1975, backing the Royal Lao government and the Kingdom of Laos, and Hmong people against the Pathet Lao and the supporting Vietnam People's Army forces.

Although the U.S. and Laos never severed diplomatic relations following the end of the war in 1975 and the communist Pathet Lao takeover of Laos with the support of North Vietnam and the Vietnam People's Army, U.S.-Lao relations deteriorated due to ideological differences. The relationship remained cool until 1982, when efforts at improvement began. The two countries restored full diplomatic relations in 1992 with a return to ambassadorial-level representation.

In 1997 the Laos Memorial was established and dedicated in Arlington National Cemetery in Virginia to officially recognize the U.S. clandestine and secret war in Laos and to honor Laotian and Hmong veterans, and their advisers, who served in Laos during the Vietnam War.

== Hmong persecution and conflict ==
The government of Laos has been accused by the U.S., United Nations and human rights organizations of committing genocide against that country's Hmong ethnic minority.

Some Hmong groups fought as CIA-backed units on the Royalist side in the Laos civil war. After the Pathet Lao took over the country in 1975, the conflict continued in isolated pockets. In 1977 a communist newspaper promised the party would hunt down the "American collaborators" and their families "to the last root".

Amnesty International, The Centre for Public Policy Analysis, Human Rights Watch, the Lao Human Rights Council, Lao Veterans of America, and other non-governmental organizations (NGOs) and advocates, including Vang Pobzeb, Kerry and Kay Danes, and others, have provided research and information about the Marxist, Pathet Lao government of Laos' serious human rights violations against Laotian political and religious dissidents and opposition groups, including many of the Hmong people. Amnesty International and The Centre for Public Policy Analysis and other NGOs have researched and provided significant reports about ongoing human rights violations in Laos by the Lao People's Army and Vietnam People's Army including: the arrest and imprisonment of civic and opposition leaders including Sombath Somphone, military attacks, rape, abduction, torture, extrajudicial killing, religious persecution, and starvation of Laotian and Hmong civilians seeking to flee persecution by Pathet Lao military and security forces.

The U.S. Commission on International Religious Freedom has previously designated the communist government of Laos a Country of Particular Concern (CPC) for religious freedom violations and has on numerous occasions placed the government of Laos on a special watch list for its serious persecution of minority Laotian and Hmong Christians as well as independent Animist and Buddhist believers. The Lao People's Army and its police and security forces have been involved in human rights violations and religious persecution in Laos.

=== Hmong refugees and repatriation ===
As many as 200,000 Hmong went into exile in Thailand, with many ending up in the USA. A number of Hmong fighters hid out in mountains in Xiangkhouang Province for many years, with a remnant emerging from the jungle in 2003.

In 1989, the United Nations High Commissioner for Refugees (UNHCR), with the support of the United States government, instituted the Comprehensive Plan of Action, a program to stem the tide of Indochinese refugees from Laos, Vietnam, and Cambodia. Under the plan, the status of the refugees was to be evaluated through a screening process. Recognized asylum seekers were to be given resettlement opportunities, while the remaining refugees were to be repatriated under guarantee of safety.

After talks with the UNHCR and the Thai government, Laos agreed to repatriate the 60,000 Lao refugees living in Thailand, including several thousand Hmong people. Very few of the Lao refugees, however, were willing to return voluntarily. Pressure to resettle the refugees grew as the Thai government worked to close its remaining refugee camps. While some Hmong people returned to Laos voluntarily, with development assistance from UNHCR, allegations of forced repatriation surfaced. Of those Hmong who did return to Laos, some quickly escaped back to Thailand, describing discrimination and brutal treatment at the hands of Lao authorities. In 1993, Vue Mai, a former Hmong soldier who had been recruited by the U.S. Embassy in Bangkok to return to Laos as proof of the repatriation program's success, disappeared in Vientiane. According to the U.S. Committee for Refugees, he was arrested by Lao security forces and was never seen again.

Following the Vue Mai incident, debate over the Hmong's planned repatriation to Laos intensified greatly, especially in the U.S., where it drew strong opposition from many Democratic and moderate and American conservatives Republicans as well as some human rights advocates, including Philip Smith of The Centre for Public Policy Analysis and the Lao Veterans of America. In an October 23, 1995 National Review article, Michael Johns, the former Heritage Foundation foreign policy expert and Republican White House aide, labeled the Hmong's repatriation a Clinton administration "betrayal," describing the Hmong as a people "who have spilled their blood in defense of American geopolitical interests." Debate on the issue escalated quickly. In an effort to halt the planned repatriation, the Republican-led U.S. Senate and U.S. House of Representatives both appropriated funds for the remaining Thailand-based Hmong to be immediately resettled in the U.S.; Clinton, however, responded by promising a veto of the legislation.

In their opposition of the repatriation plans, key Democrats as well as Republicans also challenged the Clinton administration's position that the Laotian government was not systematically violating Hmong human rights. U.S. Representative Steve Gunderson (R-WI), for instance, told a Hmong gathering: "I do not enjoy standing up and saying to my government that you are not telling the truth, but if that is necessary to defend truth and justice, I will do that." Republicans also called several Congressional hearings on alleged persecution of the Hmong in Laos in an apparent attempt to generate further support for their opposition to the Hmong's repatriation to Laos.

Although some accusations of forced repatriation were denied, thousands of Hmong people refused to return to Laos. In 1996, as the deadline for the closure of Thai refugee camps approached, and under mounting political pressure, the U.S. agreed to resettle Hmong refugees who passed a new screening process. Around 5,000 Hmong people who were not resettled at the time of the camp closures sought asylum at Wat Tham Krabok, a Buddhist monastery in central Thailand where more than 10,000 Hmong refugees were already living. The Thai government attempted to repatriate these refugees, but the Wat Tham Krabok Hmong refused to leave and the Lao government refused to accept them, claiming they were involved in the illegal drug trade and were of non-Lao origin.

In 2003, following threats of forcible removal by the Thai government, the U.S., in a significant victory for the Hmong, agreed to accept 15,000 of the refugees. Several thousand Hmong people, fearing forced repatriation to Laos if they were not accepted for resettlement in the U.S., fled the camp to live elsewhere within Thailand where a sizable Hmong population has been present since the 19th century.

In 2004 and 2005, thousands of Hmong fled from the jungles of Laos to a temporary refugee camp in the Thai province of Phetchabun. These Hmong refugees, many of whom are descendants of the former-CIA Secret Army and their relatives, claim that they have been attacked by both the Lao and Vietnamese military forces operating inside Laos as recently as June 2006. The refugees claim that attacks against them have continued almost unabated since the war officially ended in 1975, and have become more intense in recent years.

Lending further support to earlier claims that the government of Laos was persecuting the Hmong, filmmaker Rebecca Sommer documented first-hand accounts in her documentary, Hunted Like Animals, and in a comprehensive report which includes summaries of claims made by the refugees and was submitted to the U.N. in May 2006.

The European Union, UNHCHR, and international groups have since spoken out about the forced repatriation. The Thai foreign ministry has said that it will halt deportation of Hmong refugees held in Detention Centers Nong Khai, while talks are underway to resettle them in Australia, Canada, the Netherlands and the United States.

For the time being, countries willing to resettle the refugees are hindered to proceed with immigration and settlement procedures because the Thai administration does not grant them access to the refugees. Plans to resettle additional Hmong refugees in the U.S. have been complicated by provisions of President George W. Bush's Patriot Act and Real ID Act, under which Hmong veterans of the Secret War, who fought on the side of the United States, are classified as terrorists because of their historical involvement in armed conflict.

On December 27, 2009, The New York Times reported that the Thai military was preparing to forcibly return 4,000 Hmong asylum seekers to Laos by the end of the year: the BBC later reported that repatriations had started. Both United States and United Nations officials have protested this action. Outside government representatives have not been allowed to interview this group over the last three years. Médecins Sans Frontières has refused to assist the Hmong refugees because of what they have called "increasingly restrictive measures" taken by the Thai military. The Thai military jammed all cellular phone reception and disallowed any foreign journalists from the Hmong camps.

== Joint activities ==
Accounting for Americans missing in Laos from the Vietnam War has been a special focus of the bilateral relationship. Since the late 1980s, joint U.S. and Lao teams have conducted a series of excavations and investigations of sites related to cases of Americans missing in Laos.

Narcotics interdiction activities are also an important part of the bilateral relationship. The United States and Laos cooperate closely on opium crop control projects that have helped to bring about a 96% decline in opium poppy cultivation, from 42,000 hectares in 1989 to 1700 hectares in 2006. Laos, however, remains on the U.S. list of major opium producers. U.S.-sponsored demand reduction programs have increased Laos' capacity to treat both narcotic and amphetamine addiction. The U.S. also provides law enforcement assistance to help contend with the rapid growth in methamphetamine abuse and crime that has occurred in Laos since 2003.

== Foreign assistance and trade relations ==
In 2016, Barack Obama became the first sitting president to visit Laos.

The U.S. government provided more than $13.4 million in foreign assistance to Laos in FY 2006, in areas including unexploded ordnance clearance and removal, health and avian influenza, education, economic development, and governance.

In December 2004, despite significant bipartisan opposition in the U.S. Congress and Lao- and Hmong-American community George W Bush signed into law a bill extending normal trade relations to Laos. Bush was criticized by many fellow Republicans in Congress, including Congressman Mark Andrew Green and Congressman George Radanovich for this move given accusations of serious human rights violations in Laos against the Hmong people. In February 2005, a bilateral trade agreement (BTA) between the two countries entered into force. There has been a consequent rise in Lao exports to the United States, although the volume of trade remains small in absolute terms. Bilateral trade reached $15.7 million in 2006, compared with $8.9 million in 2003. The Lao Government is working to implement the provisions of the BTA.

== List of U.S. ambassadors to Laos ==
Term started	Term ended	U.S. Ambassador
August 1950	December 1950	Paul L. Guest
29 December 1950	1 November 1954	Donald R. Heath
1 November 1954	27 April 1956	Charles W. Yost
12 October 1956	8 February 1958	J. Graham Parsons
9 April 1958	21 June 1960	Horace H. Smith
25 July 1960	28 June 1962	Winthrop G. Brown
25 July 1962	1 December 1964	Leonard S. Unger
23 December 1964	18 March 1969	William H. Sullivan
24 July 1969	23 April 1973	G. McMurtrie Godley
20 September 1973	12 April 1975	Charles S. Whitehouse
August 1975	March 1978	Thomas J. Corcoran
March 1978	September 1979	George B. Roberts, Jr.
September 1979	October 1981	Leo J. Moser
November 1981	November 1983	William W. Thomas, Jr.
November 1983	August 1986	Theresa A. Tull
August 1986	August 1989	Harriet W. Isom
August 1989	26 July 1993	Charles B. Salmon, Jr.
8 January 1994	20 August 1996	Victor L. Tomseth
5 September 1996	14 June 1999	Wendy Chamberlin
18 September 2001	21 April 2004	Douglas A. Hartwick
September 4, 2004	May 2007	Patricia M. Haslach
June 22, 2007	August 22, 2010	Ravic R. Huso
November 15, 2010	August 8, 2013	Karen B. Stewart
September 16, 2013	September 21, 2016	Daniel A. Clune
November 2, 2016	January 26, 2020	Rena Bitter
February 7, 2020	September 1, 2023	Peter Haymond
September 1, 2023	February 6, 2024	Michelle Y. Outlaw (Chargé d'Affaires)
February 6, 2024	Incumbent	Heather Variava

== See also ==
- Eugene DeBruin
- Dieter Dengler
- Battle of Lima Site 85
- Vang Pao
- Vang Pobzeb
- Foreign relations of the United States
- Foreign relations of Laos
- North Vietnamese invasion of Laos
- CIA activities in Laos
- Operation White Star
- Project 404
