= List of ambassadors of the United States to Belarus =

Ambassador of the United States to Belarus
- Пасол Злучаных Штатаў у Беларусі
- Seal of the United States Department of State

- Flag of a United States ambassador

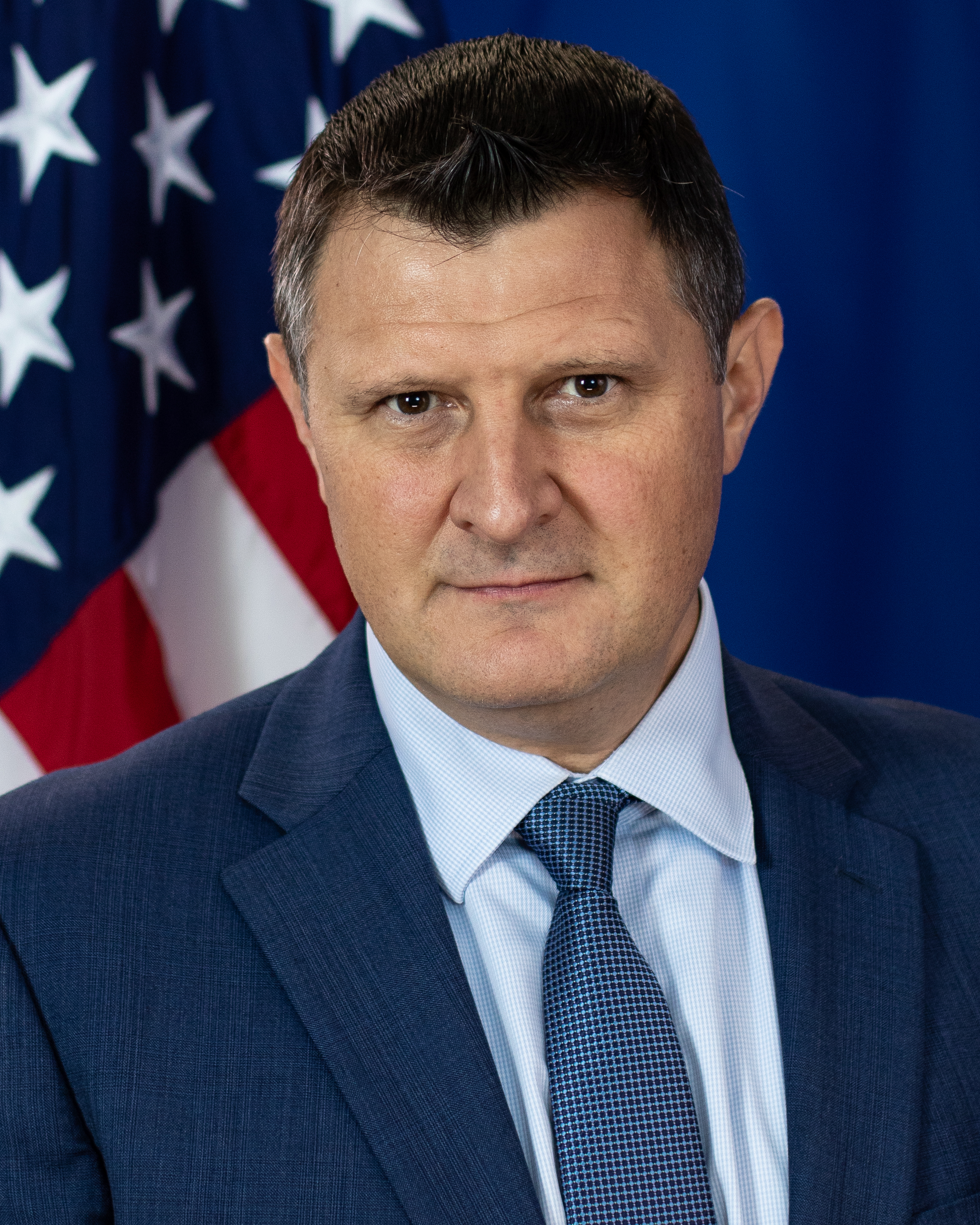
- Incumbent; Michael Kreidler as Chargé d’Affaires since July 21, 2025
- Nominator: The president of the United States
- Appointer: The president; with Senate advice and consent
- Inaugural holder: David Heywood Swartz as Ambassador Extraordinary and Plenipotentiary
- Formation: August 11, 1992
- Website: by.usembassy.gov

The United States ambassador to Belarus is the official representative of the president of the United States to the head of state of Belarus.

Until 1991, the Byelorussian Soviet Socialist Republic had been a constituent republic of the Soviet Union. During the dissolution of the Soviet Union, the Supreme Soviet of the Byelorussian Soviet Socialist Republic declared independence on August 25, 1991, and renamed itself the Republic of Belarus on September 19, 1991. The United States recognized Belarus on December 26, 1991. An embassy was established in the capital, Minsk, on January 31, 1992, with John Ford as Chargé d’Affaires ad interim. Relations between the United States and Belarus have been continuous since that time.

The U.S. Embassy in Belarus is located in Minsk. Since March 12, 2008, when Ambassador Karen Stewart was formally recalled for consultations, there has been no accredited U.S. Ambassador in Minsk. All but five U.S. diplomats were declared persona non grata on April 30, 2008.

== Ambassadors ==
Name	Title	Appointed	Presented credentials	Terminated mission	Notes
David Heywood Swartz – Career FSO	Ambassador Extraordinary and Plenipotentiary	August 11, 1992	September 9, 1992	January 21, 1994	
Kenneth Spencer Yalowitz – Career FSO	Ambassador Extraordinary and Plenipotentiary	September 29, 1994	November 7, 1994	July 8, 1997	
Daniel V. Speckhard – Career FSO	Ambassador Extraordinary and Plenipotentiary	August 1, 1997	September 18, 1997	August 5, 2000	
Michael G. Kozak – Career Civil Service (non-FSO)	Ambassador Extraordinary and Plenipotentiary	September 15, 2000	February 22, 2001	August 8, 2003	
George A. Krol – Career FSO	Ambassador Extraordinary and Plenipotentiary	July 1, 2003	October 22, 2003	July 24, 2006	
Karen B. Stewart – Career FSO	Ambassador Extraordinary and Plenipotentiary	August 14, 2006	October 24, 2006	March 12, 2008	
Jonathan M. Moore – Career FSO	Chargé d'Affaires ad interim	March 12, 2008	—	July 7, 2009	
Michael Scanlan – Career FSO	Chargé d'Affaires ad interim	July 7, 2009	—	June 2013	
Ethan A. Goldrich – Career FSO	Chargé d'Affaires ad interim	June 2013	—	June 30, 2014	
Scott Rauland	Chargé d'Affaires ad interim	June 30, 2014	—	July 8, 2016	
Robert J. Riley	Chargé d'Affaires ad interim	August 22, 2016	—	July 17, 2018	
Jenifer H. Moore	Chargé d'Affaires ad interim	August 17, 2018	—	July 27, 2020	
Jeffrey Giauque	Chargé d'Affaires ad interim	July 27, 2020	—	December 22, 2020	
Julie D. Fisher – Career FSO	Ambassador Extraordinary and Plenipotentiary	December 15, 2020	December 23, 2020	June 9, 2022	
Ruben Harutunian	Chargé d'Affaires ad interim	June 9, 2022		June 25, 2023	
Peter Kaufmann	Chargé d'Affaires ad interim	June 26, 2023		July 21, 2025	
Michael Kreidler	Chargé d'Affaires ad interim	July 21, 2025		Present	

== See also ==
- Belarus – United States relations
- Foreign relations of Belarus
- Ambassadors of the United States
