= List of ambassadors of the United States to Laos =

Ambassador of the United States to Laos
- Seal of the United States Department of State

- Flag of a United States ambassador

- Incumbent; Michelle Y. Outlaw; Chargé d'affaires since January 16, 2026
- Nominator: The president of the United States
- Appointer: The president; with Senate advice and consent
- Inaugural holder: Paul L. Guest as Chargé d'Affaires ad interim
- Formation: August 1950
- Website: U.S. Embassy - Vientiane

This is a list of United States ambassadors to Laos. The United States established full diplomatic relations with Laos in 1955, following its full independence from France in 1954.

On December 29, 1961, during the Laotian Civil War, President John F. Kennedy made the Ambassador to Laos the de facto commander of U.S. military and paramilitary operations within the Kingdom of Laos for the length of the war.

Accounting for American personnel missing in Laos and clearing unexploded ordnance (UXO) from the wars in Indochina were the initial focuses of the post-1975 bilateral relationship. Since that time the relationship has broadened to include cooperation on a range of issues including counter-narcotics, health, child nutrition, environmental sustainability, trade liberalization, and English language training. This expansion in cooperation has accelerated since 2009, with the launch of the Lower Mekong Initiative (LMI), which serves as a platform to address complex, transnational development and policy changes in the Lower Mekong sub-region. The United States and Laos share a commitment to ensuring a prosperous and sustainable future for the Mekong sub-region. In July 2012, Secretary of State Hillary Clinton visited Laos, marking the first visit by a Secretary of State since 1955.

A large part of U.S. bilateral assistance to Laos is devoted to improving health and child nutrition. The United States also helps improve trade policy in Laos, promotes sustainable development and biodiversity conservation, and works to strengthen the criminal justice system and law enforcement. The United States has provided significant support for clearance of UXO from the war, particularly cluster munitions, as well as for risk education and victims’ assistance.

== Ambassadors ==
Image	Name	Presentation of credentials	Termination of mission	Comment
	Paul L. Guest	August 1950	December 1950	ad interim
	Donald R. Heath	December 29, 1950	November 1, 1954	Resident at Saigon
	Charles Yost	November 1, 1954	April 27, 1956	
	J. Graham Parsons	October 12, 1956	February 8, 1958	
	Horace H. Smith	April 9, 1958	June 21, 1960	
	Winthrop G. Brown	July 25, 1960	June 28, 1962	
	Leonard S. Unger	July 25, 1962	December 1, 1964	
	William H. Sullivan	December 23, 1964	March 18, 1969	
	G. McMurtrie Godley	July 24, 1969	April 23, 1973	
	Charles S. Whitehouse	September 20, 1973	April 12, 1975	
	Thomas J. Corcoran	August 1975	March 1978	ad interim
	George B. Roberts, Jr.	March 1978	September 1979	ad interim
	Leo J. Moser	September 1979	October 1981	ad interim
	William W. Thomas, Jr.	November 1981	November 1983	ad interim
	Theresa Anne Tull	November 1983	August 1986	ad interim
	Harriet W. Isom	August 1986	August 1989	ad interim
	Charles B. Salmon, Jr.	August 1989	July 26, 1993	ad interim August 1989-August 1992, Ambassador August 6, 1992 – July 26, 1993
	Victor L. Tomseth	January 8, 1994	August 20, 1996	
	Wendy Chamberlin	September 5, 1996	June 14, 1999	
	Douglas A. Hartwick	September 18, 2001	April 21, 2004	
	Patricia M. Haslach	September 4, 2004	March 26, 2007	
	Ravic R. Huso	June 22, 2007	August 22, 2010	
	Karen B. Stewart	November 16, 2010	August 8, 2013	
	Daniel A. Clune	September 16, 2013	September 21, 2016	
	Rena Bitter	November 2, 2016	January 26, 2020	
	Peter Haymond	February 7, 2020	September 1, 2023	
	Michelle Y. Outlaw	September 1, 2023	February 6, 2024	ad interim
	Heather Variava	February 6, 2024	January 16, 2026	
	Michelle Y. Outlaw	January 16, 2026	Present	ad interim

== See also ==
- Laos – United States relations
- Foreign relations of Laos
- Ambassadors of the United States
