= Michael Scanlan (diplomat) =

American diplomat

United States Ambassador to Belarus as Chargé d'Affaires
- In office July 2009 – June 2013
- President: Barack Obama
- Preceded by: Jonathan M. Moore
- Succeeded by: Ethan A. Goldrich

Personal details
- Born: Michael D. Scanlan; 1961 (age 64–65)
- Citizenship: United States

Michael D. Scanlan (born 1961) is a United States career diplomat with postings in Armenia, Belarus, Bosnia and Herzegovina, Croatia, Kyrgyzstan, Montenegro ( UNTAES Mission) and Ukraine. He also served as Director for Eastern European Affairs at the State Department in Washington, D.C., and as a Pearson Fellow on the United States House Committee on Foreign Affairs.

== Career ==
From 2009 to 2013, Scanlan served as Director of the Office of Eastern European affairs at the US State Department.

=== U.S. Embassy in Belarus ===
From July 2009 to June 2013, Scanlan served as Chargé d'affaires to the Embassy of the United States, Minsk, Belarus.

=== OSCE Mission to Moldova ===
From July 2014 to 2019, Scanlan headed the Organization for Security and Co-operation in Europe (OSCE) Mission to Moldova in Chișinău, also serving as OSCE mediator to the Transdniestrian settlement process. As mediator, he played a key role in advancing the 5+2 negotiation format, focusing on output-based diplomacy and facilitating agreements that improved the lives of people on both sides of the Dniester river. He emphasized the importance of local ownership and the implementation of the "package of eight" agreements.

=== Serving in Bosnia and Herzegovina ===
In 2019, Scanlan succeeded US diplomat Dennis Walter Hearne as Principal Deputy High Representative (PDHR) in Bosnia and Herzegovina, as well as International Supervisor for Brčko. Based in Sarajevo, he served under High Representatives Valentin Inzko (until 2021) and Christian Schmidt. His appointment was recognized as a demonstration of the United States’ commitment to the stability and prosperity of Bosnia and Herzegovina and the continued implementation of the Dayton Peace Agreement. As PDHR, he worked to strengthen the integrity of elections in Brčko District, promote anti-corruption measures, and encourage cooperation among local institutions.

Diplomatic posts
| Preceded by Jonathan M. Moore | United States Ambassador to Belarus as Chargé d’Affaires; 2009–2013 | Succeeded by Ethan A. Goldrich |
