= Scott Rauland =

American diplomat

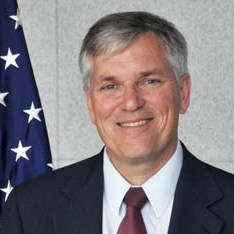

United States Ambassador to Belarus Acting
- In office June 30, 2014 – July 8, 2016
- President: Barack Obama
- Preceded by: Ethan Goldrich (Acting)
- Succeeded by: Robert Riley (Acting)

Personal details
- Born: Walworth, Wisconsin, U.S.
- Education: Earlham College; University of Chicago; Ohio State University

Scott Marshall Rauland is an American diplomat.

He received his B.A. in European history from the University of Chicago in 1981 and his M.A. in Russian language and literature from Ohio State University in 1986. From 1982 through 1984 he studied at the University of Mainz, Germany.

== Biography ==
=== Education ===
After graduation from university, he taught English in Wiesbaden, Germany, in the 1980s and Russian in Wisconsin from 1990 to 1993.

=== Career ===
Since 1993, he has been working in the U.S. Foreign Service. His first post there was Assistant Public Affairs Officer at Baku, Azerbaijan. From 1995 through 1998 he worked in Berlin as Program Development Officer for the new German Eastern states. Then, he took over the post Information Center Director in Islamabad, Pakistan for two years, before he was called to the American embassy in Quito, Ecuador, where he eventually took over the Public Affairs Division. From 2003 through 2005, he served as Consul General in Yekaterinburg, Russia, before returning to Germany to work in Frankfurt as Public Affairs Officer of the U.S. Consulate General. From late 2007 on, he worked in Afghanistan. He served as the U.S. Chargé d'affaires to Belarus at the American Embassy in Minsk from June 2014 to July 2016, followed by an assignment at the U.S. Helsinki Commission from August 2016 through December 2018, where he worked on human rights and security issues in Russia, Belarus, and the Baltics.

== See also ==
- List of ambassadors of the United States

Diplomatic posts
Preceded by Ethan Goldrich; Acting	United States Ambassador to Belarus; Acting; 2014–2016	Succeeded by Robert Riley; Acting
