= Olympus High School =

School in Holladay, Utah, U.S.

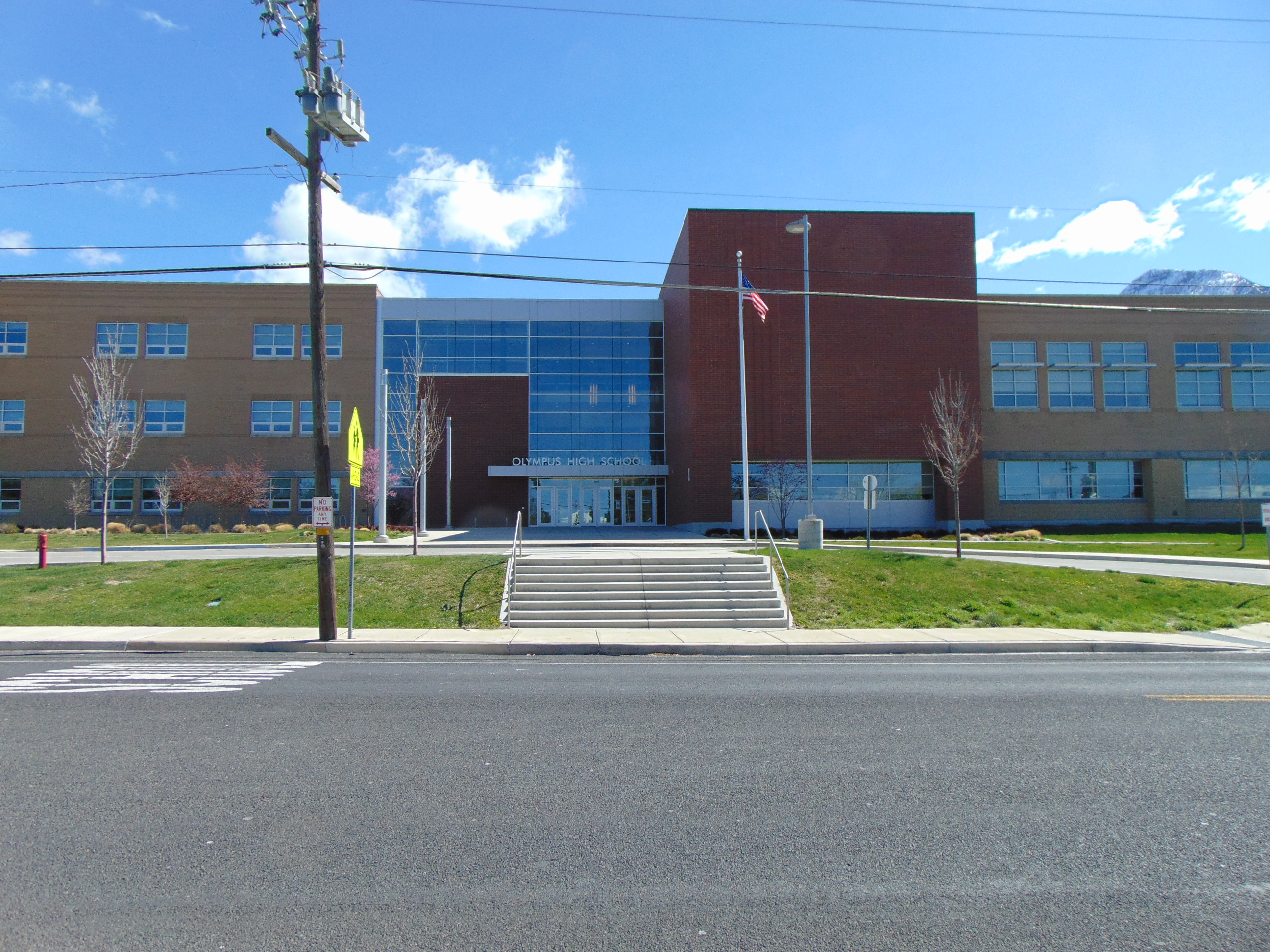
- Olympus High School, April 2017

Location
- 4055 S. 2300 East; Holladay, Utah 84124; United States; 40°41′07″N 111°49′26″W

Information
- School type: Public high school
- Motto: Titan Pride
- Established: 1953
- School district: Granite School District
- Principal: Jennifer Christensen
- Teaching staff: 83.23 (FTE)
- Grades: 9-12
- Enrollment: 2,167 (2023-2024)
- Student to teacher ratio: 26.04
- Campus type: Suburban
- Colors: Green and gray
- Mascot: Titan
- Website: Official website

Olympus High School is a public high school in the Granite School District in Holladay, Utah, a suburb of Salt Lake City.

== Description ==
The school opened on September 1, 1953, with an original enrollment of 1028 students. In the fall of 1960, the largest entering sophomore class (the graduating class of 1963) in Utah's history (an estimated 935) enrolled. Two years later the overcrowding was reduced when the new Skyline High was completed one mile east. In April 2013, the new Olympus High School building was opened for classes adjacent to the original school. The original building was torn down after 60 years of operation.

Throughout its history, Olympus has been one of the leading academic public high schools in the state. In 1961 its orchestral and vocal music program was recognized as one of the nation's finest by the Ford Foundation, which funded a composer-in-residence for the school, an award shared with schools throughout the Granite School district.

== Football ==
=== Historic rivalry ===
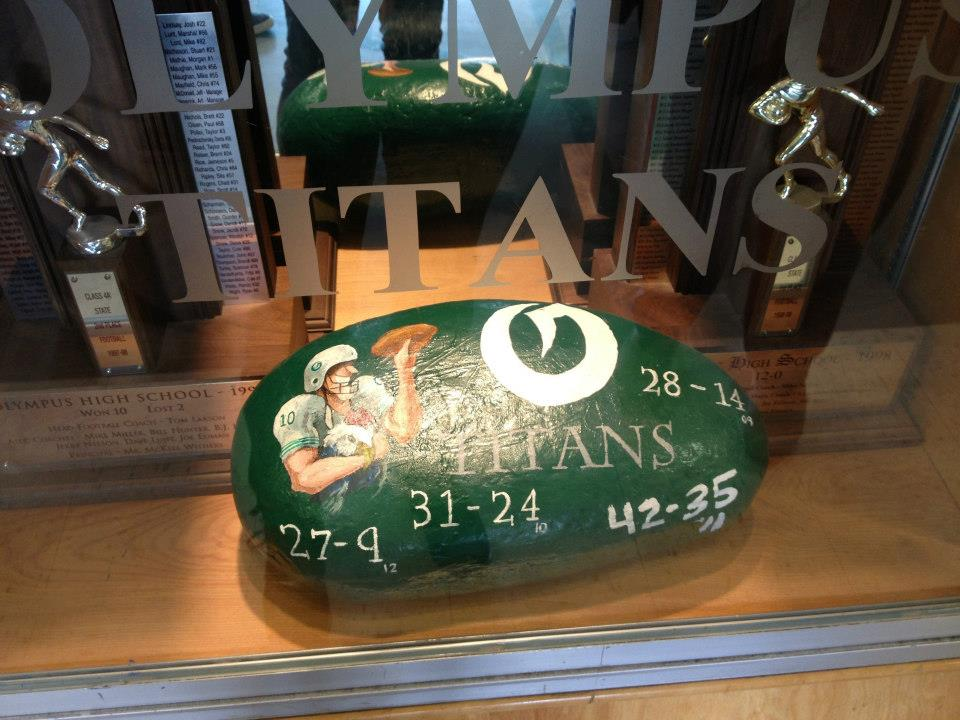

Considered one of the greatest rivalries in the state of Utah, "the Rock" is the prized rivalry trophy between Olympus and Skyline football; the schools are just one mile apart, resulting in close neighbors being divided between the schools. It is a football-shaped piece of granite, which local lore states was taken from Mt. Olympus in 1962, prior to the first contest between the two schools. The winning school paints the Rock in their colors and displays it in their trophy case. At the conclusion of the 2024-25 season, Olympus maintains the edge, 30-27–1.

=== Current ===
Olympus football has an all-time record of 349–251–9. Aaron Whitehead is the head coach. Under Whitehead, the Titans have won five of the last six region championships (2011, 2012, 2013, 2015, 2016).

=== State success ===
1984 - Beat the Alta Hawks 39–13 in the state championship game. Olympus forced 11 turnovers, including a Utah State title game record 7 interceptions. Finished the season 11–2.

1998 - Beat Bonneville 35–7 to win the state championship, finishing the season with a 12–0 record.

== Basketball ==
Olympus basketball has become well known for their 3-point shooting and full-court defense. Olympus holds several UHSAA 3-point shooting records. The Titans hold the Utah state records for most 3-point attempts (628, 1999–2000) and makes (214, 1999–2000; 211, 1996–1997) in a single season. They also hold the state record for most 3-point field goals in a single game, hitting 19 on Feb. 1, 2000 against Woods Cross.

== Swimming ==
Swimming has one of the longest high school sport seasons, stretching from September to February. In 2011 there was at least one girl ranked in the top 8 in 4A in every event and at least one boy in the top 10 in all but three events in 4A.

=== Region ===
The Olympus High girls' swimming team took first in the Region VI Championships in 2010. They went undefeated in the 2010–2011 season.

=== State ===
The girls' team also took second at 4A State in 2010. There were several first-place individual finishes by the entire team in the following events: Girls' 50 Yard Freestyle, Girls' 200 Yard Freestyle, Girls' 200 Yard Freestyle Relay, Girl's 100 Yard Backstroke, Girls' 400 Yard Freestyle Relay.

== Notable alumni ==
- Jackson Bennee (2024) – college football safety for the Utah Utes
- David Burnett (1964) - photographer for Life, Time, People and Sports Illustrated magazines and many others; author of photo retrospective of Bob Marley, Soul Rebel
- Merrill Douglas - former NFL player
- Paul W Draper (1997) - Anthropologist, Mentalist, Magician
- Jeffrey Glen Giauque - former U.S. Ambassador to Belarus
- Mark Hofmann - document forger and murderer
- Roberto Linck - professional soccer player for Major League Soccer; owner of professional soccer team Miami Dade FC; founder of Ginga Scout
- Elizabeth O'Bagy (2005) - former senior analyst at the Institute for the Study of War
- Mary Jesse (1986) - pioneer in mobile technology, executive, entrepreneur and board member
- Cameron Latu (2017) – Tight End for the San Francisco 49ers
- Logan Nelson (2014) - Singer and guitarist
- Virginia Hinckley Pearce (1963) - author of inspirational books, former general leader of the Church of Jesus Christ of Latter-day Saints (LDS Church), and daughter of former church president Gordon Bitner Hinckley
- Ronald A. Rasband (1969) - Member of the Quorum of the Twelve Apostles of LDS Church
- Karl Rove (1969) - political adviser; former Deputy White House Chief of Staff
- Ronald Scott (1963) - journalist at Time, Life, Sports Illustrated; author of Closing Circles: Trapped In The Everlasting Mormon Moment, a novel with fictional locations based on the Holladay and East Millcreek areas of Utah and its schools, including Olympus
- Taylor R. Randall (1985) - president of the University of Utah
- Paul Kay Sybrowsky (1962) - president of Southern Virginia University; former general authority of LDS Church
- Jim Waldo (1969) - computer scientist, Distinguished Engineer at Sun Microsystems Laboratories, CTO of Harvard University
- John Warnock (1958) - computer scientist, co-founder of Adobe Systems
- David Zabriskie (1997) - professional road bicycle racer

== See also ==
- List of high schools in Utah
