= Julie D. Fisher =

American diplomat

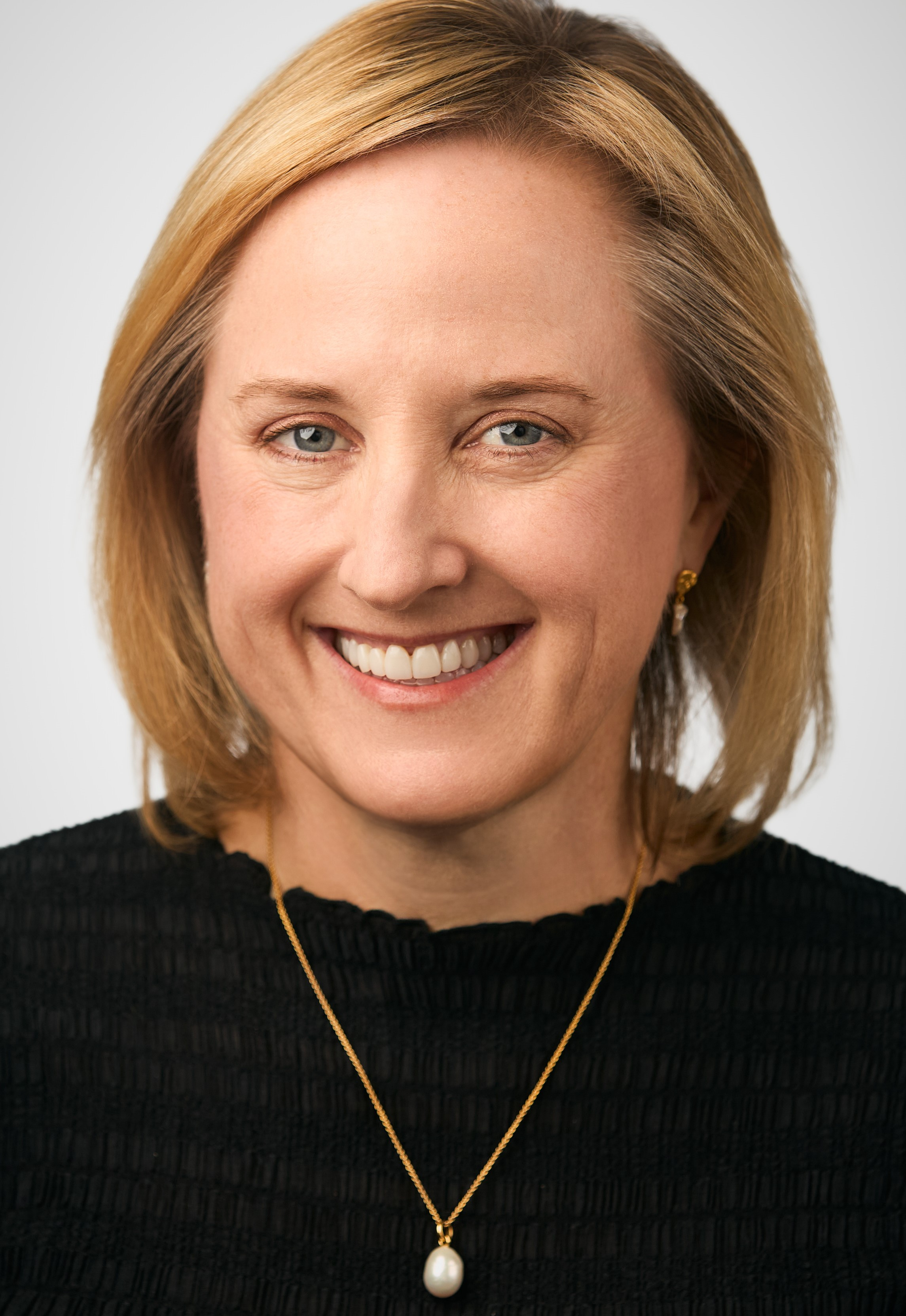

United States Chargé d'affaires to Ukraine
- In office May 5, 2025 – June 27, 2026
- President: Donald Trump
- Preceded by: John Ginkel (Chargé d'Affaires)
- Succeeded by: Sandra Oudkirk (Chargé d'Affaires)

United States Ambassador to Cyprus
- In office February 21, 2023 – May 14, 2026
- President: Joe Biden; Donald Trump
- Preceded by: Judith G. Garber
- Succeeded by: John Breslow

United States Ambassador to Belarus
- In office December 23, 2020 – June 9, 2022
- President: Donald Trump; Joe Biden
- Preceded by: Jenifer H. Moore (acting)
- Succeeded by: Ruben Harutunian (chargé d'affaires)

Deputy Assistant Secretary of State for the Bureau of European and Eurasian Affairs
- In office September 1, 2018 – December 23, 2020
- President: Donald Trump

Personal details
- Education: University of North Carolina at Chapel Hill (BA); Princeton University (MPP)

Julie Davis Fisher is an American diplomat who served as the United States ambassador to Cyprus. She served United States chargé d'affaires to Ukraine.

== Early life and education ==
Fisher earned her Bachelor of Arts in Russian and East European studies from the University of North Carolina at Chapel Hill and a Master of Public Policy from the School of Public and International Affairs at Princeton University.

== Career ==
Fisher is a career member of the Senior Foreign Service, with the rank of minister-counselor. She previously served as deputy assistant secretary of state for Western Europe and the EU in the Bureau of European and Eurasian Affairs. Before that, she was the deputy permanent representative of the U.S. Mission to NATO leading preparations for the 2018 Brussels Summit and the move to the new NATO HQ. She was the chief of staff to the deputy secretary of state for management and resources supporting reform efforts involving knowledge management, human resources and security at U.S. facilities abroad. Prior to that, Fisher served as the director of the State Department's Operations Center, the 24/7 team that facilitates communications for the Secretary of State, department principals and colleagues around the globe; the Operations Center also hosts the department's task forces and crisis response teams.

From 2011 to 2013, in support of the NATO Secretary-General, Fisher was detailed to NATO's international staff as deputy director of the Private Office. She has served in assignments at U.S. embassies in Tbilisi, Georgia; Kyiv, Ukraine; and Moscow, Russia, as well as tours at the National Security Council, the bureaus for European Affairs and Near Eastern Affairs, and as a member of the Secretary of State's Executive Secretariat Staff.

=== United States ambassador-designate to Belarus ===
On April 20, 2020, President Donald Trump nominated Fisher to be the United States ambassador to Belarus. Hearings on her nomination were held before the Senate Foreign Relations Committee on August 5, 2020. The committee favorably reported her nomination to the Senate floor on September 22, 2020. Fisher was confirmed by the Senate on December 15, 2020, via voice vote, Fisher was to become the first U.S. ambassador to Belarus since 2008 but was denied a visa by Belarusian authorities. She then served in Lithuania as a U.S. special envoy for Belarus in starting in October 2021. On June 9, 2022, Fisher announced that her tenure would be coming to an end.

=== United States ambassador to Cyprus ===
On June 15, 2022, President Joe Biden announced Fisher's nomination to be the next ambassador to Cyprus. On November 30, 2022, hearings on her nomination were held before the Senate Foreign Relations Committee. The committee favorably reported her nomination to the Senate on December 7, 2022. The Senate confirmed her nomination on December 13, 2022 via voice vote. She was sworn in by acting Deputy Secretary John R. Bass on February 1, 2023, and presented her credentials to President Nicos Anastasiades on February 21, 2023.

=== United States chargé d'affaires to Ukraine ===
On May 1, 2025, President Donald Trump appointed her as chargé d'affaires to Ukraine, effective May 5. In April 2026, it was announced that she would step down from the post.

== Personal life ==
Besides her native English, Fisher speaks Russian, French, and Georgian.

Diplomatic posts
Preceded by Jeffrey G. Giauque (acting)	United States Ambassador to Belarus; 2021–2022	Succeeded by Ruben Harutunian; Chargé d'Affaires
Preceded by Judith G. Garber	United States Ambassador to Cyprus; 2023–present	Incumbent
