= Karen B. Stewart =

American diplomat

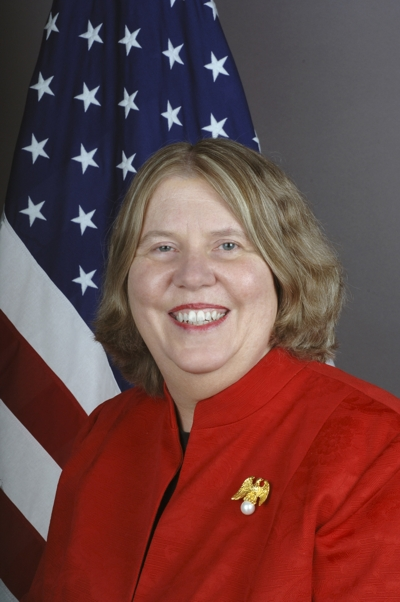

United States Ambassador to the Marshall Islands
- In office July 25, 2016 – January 27, 2020
- President: Barack Obama; Donald Trump
- Preceded by: Thomas Armbruster
- Succeeded by: Roxanne Cabral

United States Ambassador to Laos
- In office November 16, 2010 – August 8, 2013
- President: Barack Obama
- Preceded by: Ravic Huso
- Succeeded by: Daniel Clune

United States Ambassador to Belarus
- In office October 24, 2006 – March 12, 2008
- President: George W. Bush
- Preceded by: George Krol
- Succeeded by: Jonathan Moore (Acting)

Personal details
- Born: April 10, 1952 (age 74)
- Education: Wellesley College; University of Virginia; National Defense University

Karen Brevard Stewart (born April 10, 1952, Florida) is an American diplomat. She was nominated by President Barack Obama to be United States Ambassador to the Marshall Islands on November 5, 2015, was confirmed by the U.S. Senate on May 17, 2016. Stewart also served as United States Ambassador to Belarus from August 14, 2006, to March 12, 2008, and as United States Ambassador to Laos from November 2010 to August 2013.

== Early life and education ==
Stewart is the daughter of Brevard Nisbet Stewart and Selden L. Stewart II. In 1973 Stewart graduated Phi Beta Kappa from Wellesley College with a BA in astronomy and economics. She then studied astronomy at the University of Virginia.

== Career ==
Stewart joined the Foreign Service in 1977. Her early international assignments have included ones in Thailand, Sri Lanka, Laos and Pakistan. Her domestic assignments have included serving as international relations officer in the State Department's Office of Fisheries Affairs, economic officer in the Office of Energy Consuming Countries, and economic-commercial desk officer in the Office of Israel and Arab-Israeli Affairs.

Stewart earned an MS in national security strategy from the National War College of the National Defense University in 1998.

Stewart was deputy chief of mission in Belarus from 2004 to 2004 and in 2006 President George W. Bush nominated her to be the country's ambassador. However, following U.S. imposed sanctions, President Alexander Lukashenko pressured Stewart to leave the country in 2008. The United States had been a persistent critic of Lukashenko. Belarus has been labeled "Europe's last dictatorship" by some Western journalists, on account of Lukashenko's self-described authoritarian style of government. Lukashenko and other Belarusian officials are also the subject of sanctions imposed by the European Union and the United States for alleged human rights violations off and on since 2006.

In 2010 Stewart became U.S. Ambassador to Laos, where she had held two earlier posts.

When President Barack Obama nominated her to become U.S. Ambassador to the Marshall Islands, Stewart was serving as political adviser to the vice chairman of the Joint Chiefs of Staff and Supreme Allied Commander Transformation, a role she had held since 2013. She arrived in the country on July 16, 2016.

== Personal ==
In addition to English, Stewart speaks Lao, Russian and Thai.

Diplomatic posts
Preceded by George Krol	United States Ambassador to Belarus; 2006–2008	Succeeded by Jonathan Moore; Acting
Preceded by Ravic Huso	United States Ambassador to Laos; 2010–2013	Succeeded by Daniel Clune
Preceded by Thomas Armbruster	United States Ambassador to the Marshall Islands; 2016–2019	Succeeded by Roxanne Cabral
