= Roxanne Cabral =

American diplomat

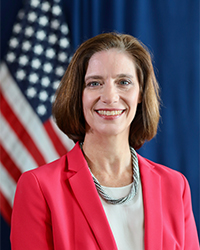

United States Ambassador to the Marshall Islands
- In office February 6, 2020 – March 3, 2023
- President: Donald Trump; Joe Biden
- Preceded by: Karen B. Stewart
- Succeeded by: Laura Stone

Personal details
- Education: Vanderbilt University; Johns Hopkins Bloomberg School of Public Health

Roxanne Cabral is a career member of the Senior Foreign Service, class of Minister-Counselor. She currently serves as Senior Vice President of the National Defense University. She has served as the United States Ambassador to the Marshall Islands and served as Deputy Chief of Mission and Chargé d'Affaires at the U.S. Embassy in Panama from 2017 to 2020. After joining the State Department in 1997, she has served at Consulate General Guangzhou as Public Affairs Section Chief (2010-2013) along with other overseas assignments including Embassy in Tirana, Albania (2004-2006), Mexico City (2001-2003), Embassy in Kyiv, Ukraine (1998-2000), and the American Institute in Taiwan (AIT). Domestic assignments including public diplomacy advisor in the Bureau of European and Eurasian Affairs (2006-2008, focusing on Balkans issues), and Office of the Under Secretary for Public Diplomacy and Public Affairs (2015-2017). She is a co-author of "Diplomacy for a Diffuse World."

During her confirmation hearings for the post in the Marshall Islands, she promised her support for Taiwan. This was in light of the US Senate on passing “legislation asking the government to help Taiwan keep its remaining 15 diplomatic allies, while supporting its international presence.” (Taiwan Allies International Protection and Enhancement Initiative Act of 2019, or TAIPEI Act 2019). During her testimony, “Cabral listed ways to support Taiwan and fight against Beijing’s Belt and Road Initiative, which the US sees as creating debt traps in the countries that join the initiative.”

In 2018, she and fellow Ambassadors Robin Bernstein and Jean Elizabeth Manes were recalled to Washington, DC to “meet with U.S. Government leaders to discuss ways in which the United States can support strong, independent, democratic institutions and economies throughout Central America and the Caribbean."

== Education ==
Cabral has a Bachelor of Arts from Vanderbilt University and a Master of Public Health from Johns Hopkins Bloomberg School of Public Health.

== See also ==
- List of current ambassadors of the United States

Diplomatic posts
Preceded by Karen B. Stewart	United States Ambassador to the Marshall Islands; 2020–2023	Vacant
