= Silver Cup =

Indie pop band

- Origin: Salt Lake City, Utah
- Genres: Indie pop
- Years active: 2019–present
- Label: Quadio Records
- Members: Logan Nelson; Hadley Nelson
- Past members: Campbell Nelson

Silver Cup is an indie pop band originally from Salt Lake City, Utah. The group began in 2019 in the Nelsons' basement, releasing their first single in November of that year, and performed live for the first time in 2021. In 2022, the band toured across the country and is currently based out of New York. Currently, the band is made up of siblings Logan and Hadley Nelson, with their third sibling Campbell once being a part of the band. Hadley serves as the lead vocalist while both Campbell and Logan have served as guitarists. The band's influence is self-described as a mix of pop, hip-hop, alternative, '90s music, Left of center pop, and R&B.

== Early lives and Formation ==
Silver Cup is a family band originally composed of three siblings Logan, Hadley, and Campbell Nelson. The siblings described in interviews that they began singing at an early age, with Logan and Hadley performing on stage at the age of 6. Logan began songwriting at age 10 and played in the band Solarsuit while attending Olympus High School.

Hadley attended Fashion Institute of Technology, Campbell attended Salt Lake Community College, and Logan attended the University of Utah, during the time they formed the band Silver Cup. Silver Cup began in 2019 with the siblings composing music out of Logan's basement apartment and largely began posting their music online. Logan cited this as an attempt to garner support before performing live. Hadley serves as a vocalist, Campbell served as the bass/guitarist, and Logan serves as a vocalist/guitarist. Brittany Barnes serves as the band's manager. The band 'Silver Cup' was named after a fish food company founded by the sibling's great-grandfather, Sterling Silver Cup Fish Food (Nelson and Sons. Inc).

== Career ==
=== Sabbath and Early Career ===
In 2019, Silver Cup released their first single "Sabbath" on November 3. This song was dedicated to Holladay, Utah, the town the trio group up in. Within the song, they reference "a bubble-esque community" and the pressures they felt growing up. The band noted that following the beginning of the COVID-19 pandemic, they saw a significant increase in viewership at around this time. In February 2020, they released their second single "You". Soon after, they released the song "Night Games" along with an accompanying music video. In April 2020, they released their 4th single "I'm Fine".

=== Debut EP Silver Cup ===
In November 2020, Silver Cup released their debut extended play, Silver Cup, sharing the same name as the band. Alongside this, the band had already released five singles and three music videos. At this time, Silver cup had accrued 300k streams on Spotify and began experiencing a strong social media presence on Instagram and TikTok. The EP centered heavily on growing up in Utah and featured Hadley and Logan as vocalists. The EP begins with the song Donny & Marie, a reference to Donny and Marie Osmond. This is followed by the songs "I'm Fine", "Spiral Jetty" (a reference to the Spiral Jetty sculpture), “Are You Scared to Die”, and “Showreel”. The Daily Utah Chronicle described the EP as:

The sound is similar to Silver Cup's early singles but still manages to take a refreshing twist on the band's traditional sound. Each track features dreamy overtones accompanied by hypnotizing vocals from Hadley and dynamic interjections from Logan.

— The Daily Utah Chronicle

Around the time of the EP's release, Campbell Nelson left the band, leaving Hadley and Logan as a duo.

=== 2021 to present ===
In April 2021, the duo released the single "Anabelle Lee". In summer 2021, the band performed their first live concert at Kilby Court. In May, 2022, Silver Cup performed at the 2022 LoveLoud Festival. By fall 2022, Silver Cup had toured from coast to coast and was now headquartered in New York. The band has also announced plans to perform at the SoundWell venue.

== Style and Influences ==
Silver Cup has described their songs as pulling inspiration from pop, hip-hop, alternative, 90's music, and R&B. Their record company, Quadio Records, describes Silver Cup's music as a blend of '80s New Wave, '90s grunge, with elements of lo-fi, hip-hop, punk, and pop. Overall, their music has been classified as indie pop and the band's members have stated their lyrics are inspired by their native Salt Lake City, Utah. The Nelson siblings would also claim the work of artists Jorja Smith, Kevin Parker, J-Dilla, Madlib, Dr. Dre, Mark Ronson, and Rick Rubin as influences on their music.
