= Wendy Chamberlin =

American diplomat (born 1948)

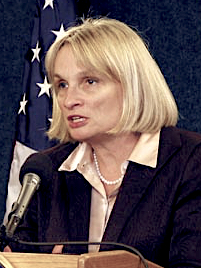
- Chamberlin in 2003

Acting United Nations High Commissioner for Refugees
- In office February 24, 2005 – June 2, 2005
- Secretary General: Ban Ki-moon
- Preceded by: Ruud Lubbers
- Succeeded by: António Guterres

United States Ambassador to Pakistan
- In office September 13, 2001 – May 29, 2002
- President: George W. Bush
- Preceded by: William Milam
- Succeeded by: Nancy Jo Powell

United States Ambassador to Laos
- In office September 5, 1996 – June 14, 1999
- President: Bill Clinton
- Preceded by: Victor L. Tomseth
- Succeeded by: Douglas A. Hartwick

Personal details
- Born: October 12, 1948 (age 77) Bethesda, Maryland, U.S.
- Children: 2 daughters
- Education: Northwestern University (BS); Boston University (MS)

Wendy Jean Chamberlin (born 12 August 1948) is an American retired diplomat who worked for the U.S. Department of State and U.S. Agency for International Development (USAID), was the deputy to the United Nations High Commissioner on Refugees (UNHCR) from 2004 to 2007, before presiding over the Middle East Institute from 2007 until 2018. She held two ambassadorial appointments, to Laos (1996–1999) and Pakistan (2001–2002).

== Career ==
=== US Department of State ===
- 1975 – Foreign Service officer
- Various offices:
  - Office of Israel and Arab-Israeli Affairs
  - Acting Director of Regional Affairs
  - Director of Press and Public Affairs in the Near Eastern Affairs Bureau
  - Special Assistant for South Asian Affairs to the Under Secretary for Political Affairs
  - Staff worker for Deputy Secretary of State and Assistant Secretary of State for East Asian Affairs
- 1993 – 1996 – Deputy Chief of Mission at the U.S. Embassy in Kuala Lumpur, Malaysia.
- 1996 – 1999 – Ambassador to Laos (Lao People's Democratic Republic).
- 1999 – July, 2001 – Principal Deputy Assistant Secretary in the Bureau for International Narcotics and Law Enforcement Affairs (INL)
- July 18, 2001 – June, 2002 – United States Ambassador to Pakistan.

=== USAID ===
- December 2, 2002 – Appointed Assistant Administrator. Served as head of the USAID Asia and Near East Bureau.
- December 22, 2003 – Ends tenure with USAID to move to UNHCR.

=== UN High Commissioner on Refugees (UNHCR) ===
- December 12, 2003 – Appointed as Deputy High Commissioner on Refugees by High Commissioner for Refugees Ruud Lubbers.
- January 19, 2004 – Officially welcomed as Deputy High Commissioner.
- February 24 – June 2, 2005 – Appointed as acting High Commissioner on the retirement of Ruud Lubbers. Served until the appointment of former Portuguese Prime Minister António Guterres.
- February 25, 2005 – Called for donations and humanitarian aid to prevent suffering in South Sudan.
- April 1–22, 2005 – Toured refugee camps in Sudan and Chad, where women expressed their fears of returning home. She urged Sudan to protect its own citizens.
- April 25, 2005 – Speaking from Geneva, she emphasized the need for funding and to bring security to the war-torn region of Darfur in Sudan.
- June 22, 2005 – Presented the Nansen Refugee Award to Marguerite "Maggie" Barankitse, known as the "Angel of Burundi."
- April 16–21, 2006 – Traveled to Pakistan to view earthquake survivors and Afghan refuge camps.
- December 18, 2006 – Visits refugee camps in Kenya where Somalis have fled both war and flooding.

=== Middle East Institute ===
- March 1, 2007 – Assumes presidency of the Middle East Institute.

Diplomatic posts
Preceded by Victor L. Tomseth	United States Ambassador to Laos; 1996–1999	Succeeded by Douglas A. Hartwick
Preceded by William Milam	United States Ambassador to Pakistan; 2001–2002	Succeeded by Nancy Jo Powell
Diplomatic posts
Preceded by Ruud Lubbers	United Nations High Commissioner for Refugees; Acting; 2005	Succeeded by António Guterres
