= Jeffrey G. Giauque =

American diplomat

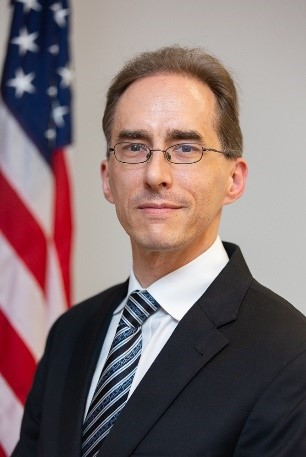

United States Ambassador to Belarus
- In office July 27, 2020 – December 22, 2020
- Preceded by: Jenifer H. Moore
- Succeeded by: Julie D. Fisher

Personal details
- Born: Jeffrey Glen Giauque Utah, United States
- Education: University of Utah; Ohio State University

Jeffrey Glen Giauque is an American diplomat who served as Chargé d’Affaires at the United States' embassy in Belarus.

== Biography ==
Giauque was born in Utah and went to Olympus High. He attained a Bachelors of Arts in history and French from the University of Utah and received a Master of Arts and PhD from Ohio State University in European international history and the history of American foreign relations. He wrote his doctoral dissertation on the European Economic Community in 1999.

Giauque taught international relations and European history at Miami University (of Ohio).

Following September 11th attacks, Giauque would take a job in the United States' embassy in Croatia, ultimately working as vice consul.

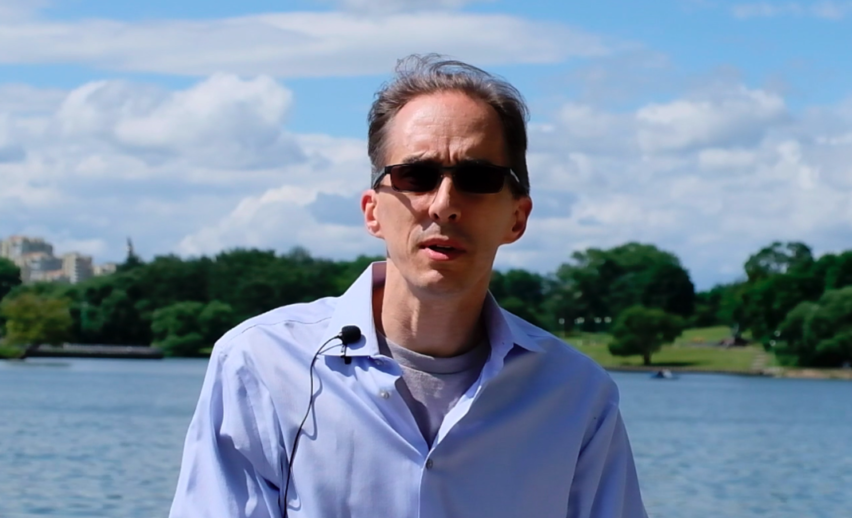
Giauque introducing himself as the new U.S. Ambassador to Belarus

In July 2020, Giauque was made Chargé d’Affaires at the United States' Embassy in Belarus. While serving he stressed that the United States supported the development and expansion of the Belarus High Technologies Park. He also would meet with officials from the New Life Church, a Full Gospel community that was evicted by authorities, describing their situation as an infringement on religious freedom.

== Personal life ==
Giauque is a husband, father, and a lover of cycling and American football.

== Publications ==
- Grand Designs and Visions of Unity: The Atlantic Powers and the Reorganization of Western Europe, 1955-1963 (Chapel Hill: University of North Carolina Press, 2002)
