= Patricia M. Haslach =

American diplomat

Patricia Haslach
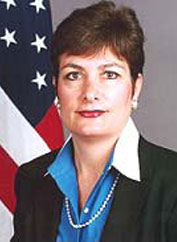

Acting Assistant Secretary of State for Economic and Business Affairs
- In office January 20, 2017 – September 1, 2017
- President: Barack Obama; Donald Trump
- Preceded by: Charles Rivkin
- Succeeded by: Manisha Singh

United States Ambassador to Ethiopia
- In office August 4, 2013 – August 31, 2016
- Preceded by: Donald E. Booth
- Succeeded by: Peter H. Vrooman

United States Ambassador to Laos
- In office September 4, 2004 – March 26, 2007
- President: George W. Bush
- Preceded by: Douglas A. Hartwick
- Succeeded by: Ravic R. Huso

Personal details
- Born: Patricia Marie Haslach; 1956 (age 69–70) Lake Oswego, Oregon, U.S.
- Spouse: Jonathan Wilks
- Education: Gonzaga University (BA); Columbia University (MIA)

Patricia Marie Haslach (born 1956) is an American diplomat. She served as the Acting Assistant Secretary of State for Economic and Business Affairs, from January 2017 to September 2017. She previously served as the United States Ambassador to Ethiopia from August 4, 2013 through September 2016.

== Early life and education ==
A native of Lake Oswego, Oregon, Haslach earned her BA from Gonzaga University in Spokane, Washington and her Master in International Affairs from the European Institute at Columbia University.

== Career ==
Haslach began her career with the federal government at the United States Department of Agriculture and was assigned to India as the regional agricultural attaché from 1987 to 1990. She followed that assignment with a United States Department of State posting to the United States Mission to the European Union, managing assistance to Group of 24.

Haslach previously served as principal deputy assistant secretary of the Bureau of Conflict and Stabilization Operations. Prior to this, Haslach was the State Department's coordinator for Iraq transition in the Office of the Deputy Secretary for Management and Resources. In this position, she was responsible for coordinating all Washington-based State Department aspects of the U.S. transition from military to civilian operations culminating with the withdrawal of U.S. combat troops at the end of December 2011.

Haslach served as the deputy coordinator for diplomacy for the Feed the Future Initiative from June 2010 to March 2011 and as assistant chief of mission for assistance transition at the Embassy of the United States, Baghdad from July 2009 to June 2010, where she was responsible for overseeing the transfer, transformation, and completion of development and assistance programs. As director for the Office for Afghanistan from 2002 to 2004, Haslach oversaw a multi-billion-dollar reconstruction program. From 2007 to 2009, she was Ambassador to the Asia-Pacific Economic Cooperation (APEC), and from 2004 to 2007, she was U.S. Ambassador to the Lao People's Democratic Republic. She has also served as Economic Counselor in Pakistan and Deputy Economic Counselor in Indonesia and Nigeria.

Haslach has received numerous awards during her career, including a Superior Honor Award for Afghanistan reconstruction in 2004, The Director General's Award for Impact and Originality in Reporting in 2002, The Herbert Salzman Award for Excellence in International Economic Performance in 2002, and the Sinclaire Language Award for distinguished study of a hard language and its associated culture in 1998.

== Personal life ==
Haslach is married to Jonathan Wilks, a British diplomat who has served as the British Ambassador to Iraq, Oman, and Yemen. They have two daughters.

Diplomatic posts
Preceded by Douglas A. Hartwick	United States Ambassador to Laos; 2004–2007	Succeeded by Ravic R. Huso
Preceded by Donald E. Booth	United States Ambassador to Ethiopia; 2013–2016	Succeeded by Michael A. Raynor
