= Carl Risch =

American lawyer (born 1970)

Carl C. Risch
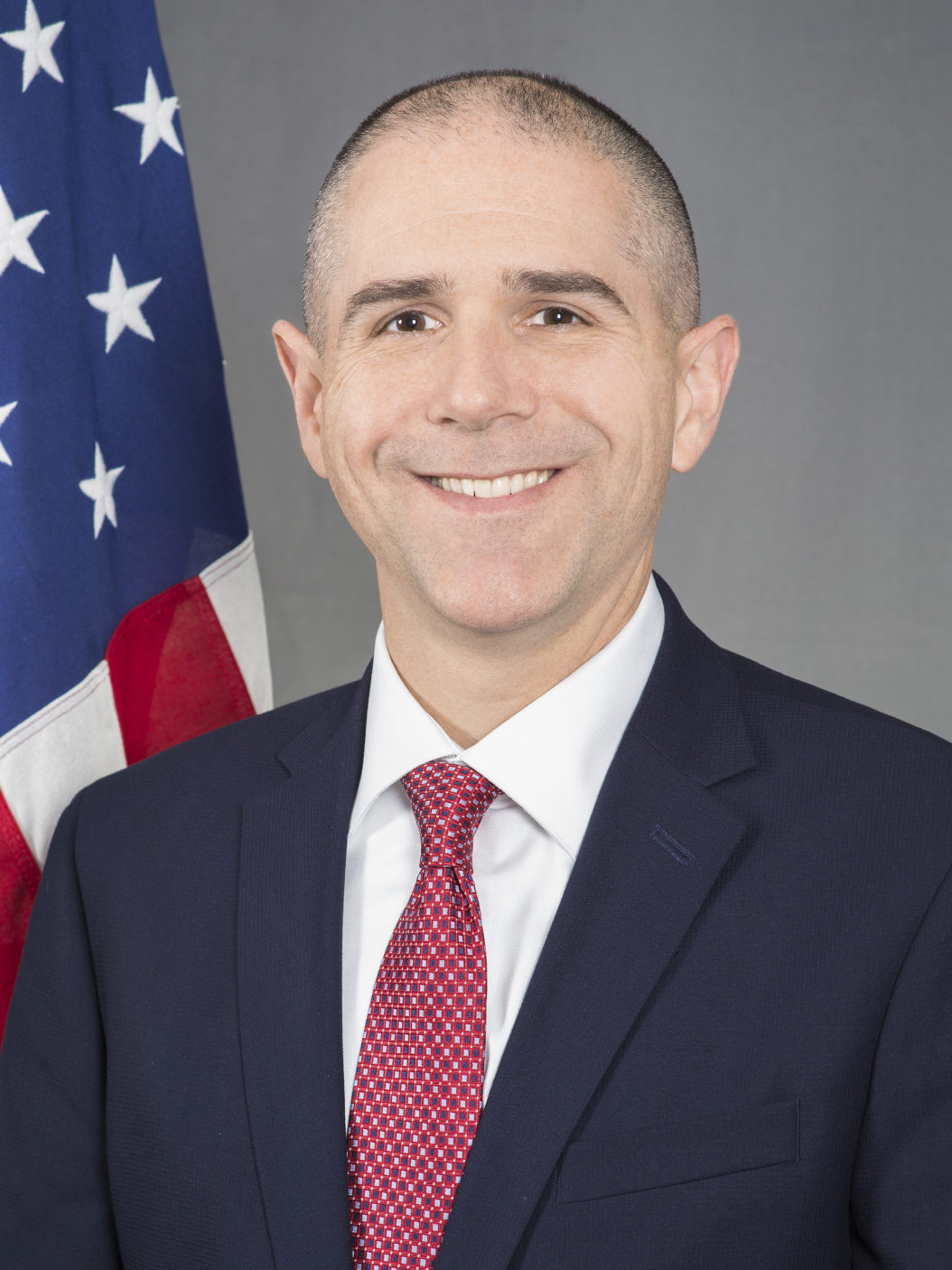

15th Assistant Secretary of State for Consular Affairs
- In office August 11, 2017 – December 21, 2020
- President: Donald Trump
- Preceded by: Michele Thoren Bond
- Succeeded by: Rena Bitter

Personal details
- Born: March 10, 1970 (age 56) Bloomsburg, Pennsylvania
- Spouse: Wendy
- Children: 2
- Education: Bloomsburg University of Pennsylvania (BA); Pennsylvania State University (JD)

Carl C. Risch (born March 10, 1970) is an American lawyer and former government official who served as Assistant Secretary of State for Consular Affairs within the U.S. Department of State from 2017 to 2020, as acting chief of staff for the United States Citizenship and Immigration Services (USCIS), and as Deputy Director of the Executive Office for Immigration Review within the U.S. Department of Justice. He was a field office director for USCIS at the U.S. embassy in Seoul, South Korea and a Foreign Service Officer with the United States Department of State.

== Early life and education ==
Risch was born in Bloomsburg, Pennsylvania, the adopted son of an auto parts factory worker. He earned a Bachelor of Arts in political science from the Bloomsburg University of Pennsylvania in 1992 and earned a Juris Doctor from Penn State Dickinson Law in 1995.

== Career ==
After graduating from law school, Risch worked as a litigation associate for the law firm of Kirkpatrick and Lockhart. He went on to practice corporate law at Martson Deardorff Williams & Otto and to serve as an assistant adjunct professor of business law at Franklin & Marshall College.

In 1999, Risch joined the United States Foreign Service. He was a consular officer in the Nonimmigrant Visa Unit at the U.S. Consulate General in Amsterdam. He also assisted the American Citizens Services Unit at the U.S. Embassy. In 2002, Risch rejoined the law firm of Martson Deardorff Williams & Otto and was subsequently made a partner.

In 2006, Risch joined the United States Citizenship and Immigration Services (USCIS) in the United States Department of Homeland Security. During his tenure at USCIS, he worked as an appeals officer and manager, as a field officer in the Philippines and in Seoul, and as acting chief of staff. He made refugee processing visits to Thailand, Pakistan, Namibia, and Malaysia. As Assistant Secretary, in May 2018 Risch traveled to Pyongyang, North Korea, and facilitated the release of three American hostages from the North Korean regime.

In June 2017, President Donald Trump nominated Risch to serve as Assistant Secretary of State for Consular Affairs. Risch was confirmed to this position by the United States Senate on August 3, 2017.

In December 2020, Risch was appointed Deputy Director of the Executive Office for Immigration Review.

In May 2021, Risch resigned as Deputy Director and was named a partner in the Global Mobility & Migration practice of the law firm Mayer Brown.
