= Heather Variava =

American diplomat

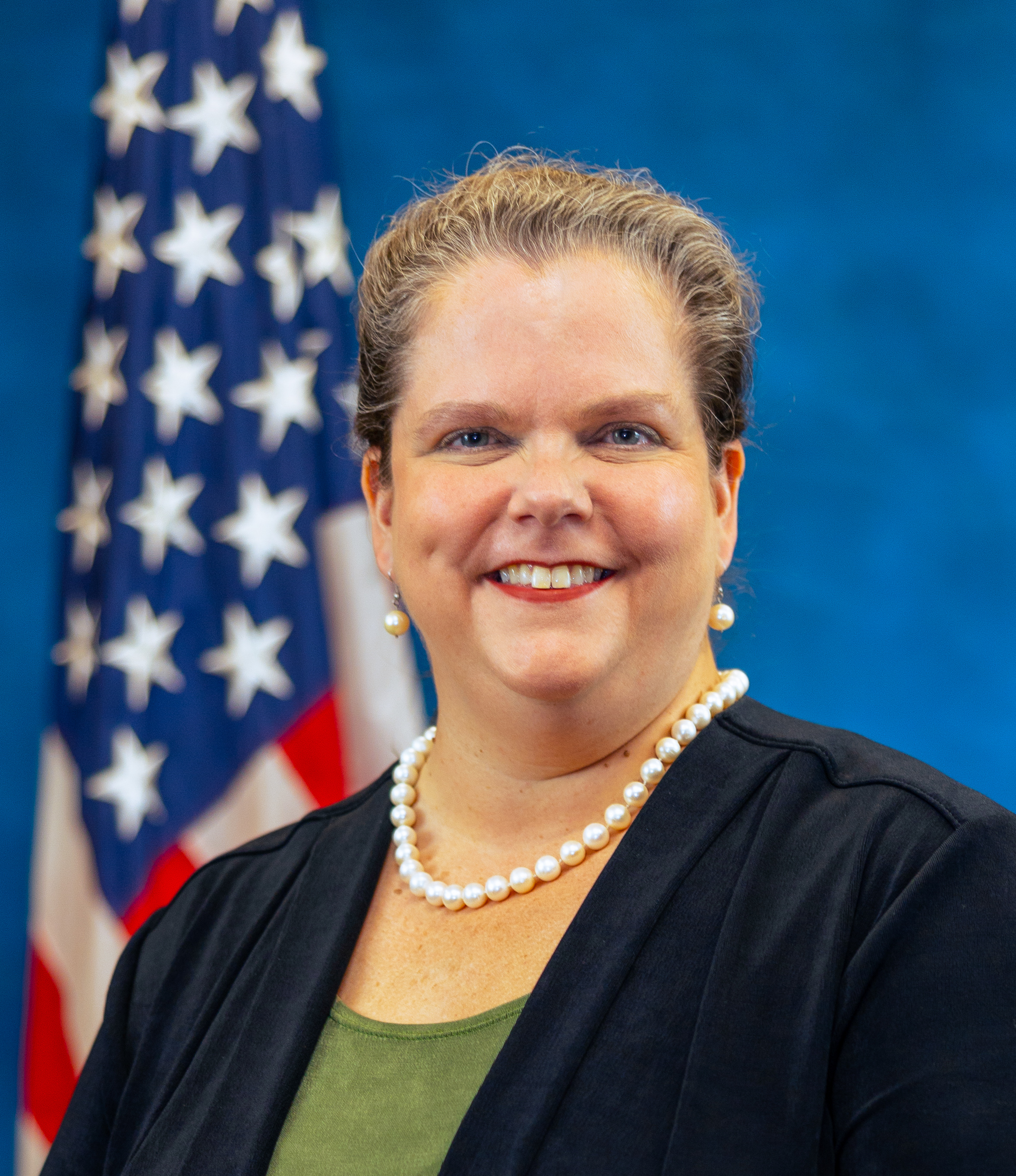

United States Ambassador to Laos
- In office February 6, 2024 – January 16, 2026
- President: Joe Biden; Donald Trump
- Preceded by: Peter Haymond

Personal details
- Education: Georgetown University (BA); University of Missouri, University of Sussex (MA); National War College (MS)

Heather Roach Variava is an American diplomat who had served as the United States ambassador to Laos.

== Early life and education ==
Variava received a bachelor's degree from Georgetown University's School of Foreign Service. Variava also received master's degrees from the University of Missouri, the University of Sussex, and the National War College. In addition, she finished a fellowship with the International Women’s Forum.

== Career ==
Variava is a career member of the Senior Foreign Service with the rank of Minister-Counselor. She served as the Deputy Chief of Mission at the U.S. Embassy in Manila, Philippines. Variava previously had stints as Deputy Chief of Mission and Chargé d'Affaires, ad interim, at the U.S. Embassy in Jakarta, Indonesia, as well as the U.S. Consul General in Surabaya, Indonesia. Domestically, Variava was the Director of the Office of Nepal, Sri Lanka, Bangladesh, Maldives, and Bhutan in the Bureau of South and Central Asian Affairs, and also worked at the State Department Operations Center. Overseas assignments include postings at U.S. Missions in India, Mauritius, Vietnam, and Bangladesh.

=== U.S. ambassadorship nomination ===
On February 13, 2023, President Joe Biden nominated Variava to be the next ambassador to Laos. Hearings on her nomination were held before the Senate Foreign Relations Committee on May 17, 2023. Her nomination was favorably reported by the committee on June 8, 2023. On November 29, 2023, her nomination was confirmed by United States Senate by voice vote. She presented her credentials to President of Laos Thongloun Sisoulith on February 6, 2024.

== Personal life ==
A native of Iowa, Variava speaks Indonesian, and has studied French, German, and Vietnamese.
