= Freedom of religion in Laos =

The Constitution of Laos provides for freedom of religion; however, the Government restricted this right in practice. Some government officials committed abuses of citizens' religious freedom.

In 2023, the country was scored 1 out of 4 for religious freedom; it was noted that the Lao People's Revolutionary Party controls clergy training and supervision of Buddhist temples. There have been several recent cases of Christians being briefly detained for unauthorized religious activities.

In the same year, the country was ranked as the 31st worst place in the world to be a Christian; it was noted that Christians are often seen as Western-influenced 'enemies of the state' and that leaders of unregistered churches have been arrested and detained until their families and churches pay money for their release.

In late 2022, a preacher from the Lao Evangelical Church was reported murdered after several months of intimidation.

During the period covered by this report, the overall status of respect for religious freedom did not significantly change. While respect for non-Protestant groups appeared to improve slightly, respect for Protestant groups appeared to decline in several parts of the country. In most areas, officials generally respected the constitutionally guaranteed rights of members of most faiths to worship, albeit within strict constraints imposed by the Government. Authorities in some areas continued to display intolerance for minority religious practice especially by Protestant Christians. The Lao Front for National Construction (LFNC), a popular front organization for the Lao People's Revolutionary Party (LPRP), was responsible for oversight of religious practice. The Prime Minister's Decree on Religious Practice (Decree 92) was the principal legal instrument defining rules for religious practice. Decree 92 also institutionalized the Government's role as the final arbiter of permissible religious activities. Although this decree has contributed to greater religious tolerance since it was promulgated in 2002, authorities have increasingly used its many conditions to restrict some aspects of religious practice.

During the period covered by this report, some local officials pressured minority Protestants to renounce their faith on threat of arrest or forceful eviction from their villages. Such cases occurred in Bolikhamsai, Houaphan, and Luang Namtha provinces. Arrests and detention of Protestants occurred in Luang Namtha, Oudomsai, Salavan, Savannakhet, and Vientiane provinces. Two Buddhist monks were arrested in Bolikhamsai Province for having been ordained without government authorization. In some areas, minority Protestants were forbidden from gathering to worship. In areas where Protestants were actively proselytizing, local officials have sometimes subjected them to "reeducation."

A Christian man in Salavan Province was arrested on April 1, 2006 for refusing to renounce his faith and placed under house arrest until his release in late July 2006. At the end of the period covered by this report, there were four known religious prisoners, as well as at least seven other Protestants who were apparently being detained without charges for other than religious reasons, but in whose cases religion was suspected to have played a role. Conflicts between ethnic groups and movement among villages sometimes exacerbated religious tensions. The efforts of some Protestant congregations to establish churches independent of the Lao Evangelical Church (LEC) continued to cause strains within the Protestant community.

== Religious demography ==
The country has an area of 85,000 square miles (220,000 km^{2}) and a population of 6.4 million. Almost all ethnic or "lowland" Lao are followers of Theravada Buddhism; however, lowland Lao constitute only 40-50 percent of the population. The remainder of the population belongs to at least 48 distinct ethnic minority groups. Most of these ethnic minorities are practitioners of animism, with beliefs that vary greatly among groups. Animism is predominant among most Sino-Thai groups, such as the Thai Dam and Thai Daeng, as well as among Mon-Khmer and Burmo-Tibetan groups. Even among lowland Lao, many pre-Buddhist animistic religious beliefs have been incorporated into Theravada Buddhist practice. Catholics and Protestants constitute approximately 2 percent of the population. Other minority religious groups include those practicing the Baha'i faith, Islam, Mahayana Buddhism, and Confucianism. A very small number of citizens follow no religion.

== Status of religious freedom ==
=== Legal and policy framework ===
The Constitution, promulgated in 1991, provides for freedom of religion; however, local authorities in particular sometimes violated this right. Article 30 of the Constitution provides for freedom of religion, a fact frequently cited by officials in reference to religious tolerance. Article 9 of the Constitution, however, discourages all acts that create divisions among religious groups and persons. The Government has interpreted this clause restrictively, and both local and central government officials widely refer to Article 9 as a reason for placing constraints on religious practice, especially proselytizing and the expansion of Protestantism among minority groups. Although official pronouncements acknowledge the existence of different religious groups, they emphasize religion's potential to divide, distract, or destabilize.

A person arrested or convicted for religious offenses, as with most other alleged civil liberties violations, had little protection under the law. Detained persons may be held for lengthy periods without trial. Court judges, not juries, decided guilt or innocence in court cases, and the defense rights of the accused were limited. All religious groups, including Buddhists, practice their faith in an atmosphere in which application of the law is arbitrary. Certain actions interpreted by officials as threatening brought harsh punishment. Religious practice was "free" only if practitioners stayed within tacitly understood guidelines of activity acceptable to the Government.

The Government typically refused to acknowledge any wrongdoing on the part of its officials, even in egregious cases of religious persecution. Blame was usually attributed to the victims rather than the persecuting officials. In some past cases, officials concocted patently unbelievable explanations for events in order to exonerate local officials. While the Government has sometimes admitted that local officials are often part of the problem, it has been unwilling to take action against officials who have violated laws and regulations on religious freedom.

In its 20 articles, Decree 92 establishes guidelines for religious activities in a broad range of areas. While the decree provides that the Government "respects and protects legitimate activities of believers," it also seeks to ensure that religious practice "conforms to the laws and regulations." Decree 92 reserves for the LFNC the "right and duty to manage and promote" religious practice, requiring that nearly all aspects of religious practice receive the approval of the LFNC office having responsibility for the village, district, and province where the activity occurs and, in some cases, requiring approval from the central level LFNC.

Decree 92 legitimizes proselytizing by Lao citizens, printing religious materials, owning and building houses of worship, and maintaining contact with overseas religious groups–all contingent upon a strict approval process. In practice, the Government used the approval process to restrict the religious activities of certain groups and has effectively prevented some religious denominations from importing and printing religious materials as well as constructing houses of worship.

The Government required several religious groups, apparently with the exception of Buddhists and Catholics, to report membership information periodically to the Religious Affairs Department of the LFNC. The Government also restricted the publication of religious materials that applied to most religious groups, again excepting Buddhists.

Both the Constitution and Decree 92 assert that religious practice should serve national interests by promoting development and education and instructing believers to be good citizens. The Government presumed both a right and a duty to oversee religious practice at all levels to ensure religious practice fills these roles in society. In effect this has led the Government to intervene in the activities of minority religious groups, particularly Protestants, on the grounds that their practices did not promote national interests or demonstrated disloyalty to the Government.

Although the state is secular in name and practice, members of governmental institutions are by-and-large followers of Theravada Buddhism, the religion of the majority of the ethnic Lao population. The Government's exemption of Buddhism from many of the Decree 92 restrictions imposed on other organized religions and its promotion of Buddhism as an element of the country's cultural and spiritual identity gave Theravada Buddhism the status of an unofficial national religion. Many persons regarded Buddhism as both an integral part of the national culture and a way of life. The increasing incorporation of Buddhist ritual and ceremony in state functions reflected the elevated status of Buddhism in society.

In some areas where animism predominated among ethnic minority groups, local authorities have actively encouraged those groups to adopt Buddhism and abandon their "backward" beliefs in magic and spirits. The Government discouraged animist practices that it regarded as outdated, unhealthy, or illegal, such as the practice in some tribes of killing children born with defects or of burying the bodies of deceased relatives under peoples' homes.

Although the Government did not maintain diplomatic relations with the Holy See, representatives of the Papal Nuncio visited from Thailand and coordinated with the Government on assistance programs, especially for lepers and persons with disabilities.

Since 2001 the Government has more closely scrutinized the activities of Laos' small Muslim population but has not interfered with the community's religious activities. Muslims in the small Islamic community were able to practice their faith openly and attend the two active mosques. Daily prayers and the weekly Jumaat prayer on Fridays proceeded unobstructed, and all Islamic celebrations were allowed. Muslims were permitted to go on the Hajj. Groups that conduct Tabligh teachings for the faithful came from Thailand once or twice per year. In 2006, a local Muslim joined with members of other religious groups to represent the Government at an Interfaith Conference on Religion in Jakarta, Indonesia.

The Government observes two religious holidays, the That Luang Festival (the end of Buddhist Lent) and the Buddhist New Year. It recognized the popularity and cultural significance of Buddhist festivals, and most senior officials openly attended them. The Government generally allowed major religious festivals of all established congregations without hindrance.

Authorities require new denominations to join other religious groups with similar historical antecedents despite clear differences between the groups' beliefs. In March 2004 the LFNC's Order Number 1 required all Protestant groups to become a part of the LEC or the Seventh-day Adventist Church. The order stated that no other denominations would be permitted to register, a measure to prevent "disharmony" in the religious community. Although the Prime Minister's Decree on Religious Practice establishes procedures for new denominations to register, the Government's desire to consolidate religious practice for purposes of control has effectively blocked new registrations. In theory, denominations not registered with the LFNC were not allowed to practice their faith.

There was no religious instruction in public schools nor were there any parochial or religiously-affiliated schools operating in the country. However, several private pre-schools and English language schools received support from religious groups abroad. In practice many boys spent some time in Buddhist temples, where they received instruction in religion as well as in academics. Temples traditionally have filled the role of schools and continued to play this role in smaller communities where formal education was limited or unavailable. Christian denominations, particularly the LEC, Seventh-day Adventists, and the Catholic Church, operated Sunday schools for children and young persons. Baha'i Spiritual Assemblies conducted religious training for children as well as for adult members.

The Government requires and routinely granted permission for formal links with co-religionists in other countries. In practice the line between formal and informal links was blurred, and relations generally were established without much difficulty.

=== Restrictions on religious freedom ===
The Government's tolerance of religion varied by region and by religion. Throughout the country, however, religious practice was restrained by official rules and policies that only allowed religious groups to practice their faith under circumscribed conditions. LEC members and other Protestant groups that have wanted to be recognized as separate from the LEC continued to be the targets of most restrictions. The Buddhist Supreme Patriarch, or Sangkarat, maintained close links to the Government. Government officials commonly invited Buddhist monks to bless newly opened Government buildings and offices. As a result of the Government's decentralization policy that diffused power to provinces and districts, central government control over the behavior of provincial, district, and local officials was weakened. Local officials were often unaware of government policies on topics such as religious tolerance due to the incomplete dissemination and application of existing laws and regulations and, when aware of the laws, often failed to enforce the laws. The LFNC at times visited areas where religious persecution had taken place in order to instruct local officials on government policy and regulation. More often, however, the LFNC's Religious Affairs Department encouraged local or provincial governments to resolve conflicts on their own and in accordance with Decree 92.

In some areas unauthorized churches have generally been allowed to conduct services without hindrance by local authorities. Within the LEC, some congregations have sought greater independence and have forged their own connections with Protestant groups abroad. Authorities in several provinces insisted that independent church congregations return to the LEC, but in other areas authorities allowed independent churches to conduct services without hindrance.

Methodists have consistently sought to register with the LFNC since the beginning of this decade as a separate denomination. In early 2006, Methodists again requested to register with the Government as a religious group separate and apart from the LEC but received no official response. In early 2006 some village and district officials appeared to be taking a stronger stance against unauthorized Methodist congregations; however, this reportedly tapered off in late 2006.

Between 1999 and 2001 local authorities closed approximately 20 of Vientiane Province's 60 LEC churches. Beginning in 2002, most of these churches were allowed to reopen. However, despite requests, officials in several districts of Savannakhet Province did not allow local congregations to reopen as many as 6 of Savannakhet's approximately 40 churches, and they remained closed at the end of the reporting period. Despite recent requests that a church building in Dong Nong Khun Village, which was confiscated by local officials in 2000, be returned to its congregation, provincial officials stated in early 2007 that the number of Protestants in the village was not sufficient to warrant having a church even though local Protestants claimed more than 100 worshippers in the village.

As many as 200 of the LEC's nearly 400 congregations do not have permanent church structures and conduct worship services in members' homes. Since the 2002 promulgation of Decree 92, officials from the LFNC's Religious Affairs Department have stated that home churches should be replaced with designated church structures whenever possible. At the same time, village and district LFNC offices often refused permission to construct new churches, and home churches remained the only viable place of worship for many LEC congregations. The LEC continued to encounter difficulties registering new congregations and receiving permission to establish new places of worship or repair existing facilities, particularly in Luang Prabang City, Attapeu, Luang Namtha, and Savannakhet provinces. No new LEC churches were permitted during the reporting period.

Baha'i spiritual assemblies in Vientiane and Savannakhet cities practiced freely, but smaller communities in Khammouane and Savannakhet provinces periodically faced restrictions by local authorities, such as limitations on both the nature and extent of some religious activities.

Lao authorities remained suspicious of major supporters, both foreign and domestic, of religious communities other than Buddhism, especially Protestant groups, in part because these faiths do not share the high degree of direction and incorporation into the government structure that Theravada Buddhism does. Some authorities criticized Christianity as an American or imperialist "import" into the country. In the past decade, the LEC suffered the brunt of local-level efforts to close churches, arrest church leaders, and force members to renounce their faith. The LEC's rapid growth during the last decade, its contacts with religious groups abroad, the active proselytizing by some of its members, and its relative independence of government control contributed to the Government's suspicion of the church's activities. Some authorities also interpreted Christian teachings of obedience to God as signifying disloyalty to the Government and ruling party. There was also strong evidence that the Communist Party leadership viewed Christianity as a tool of western countries to undermine the Communist political system. While LEC leadership was primarily Lao, the LEC membership was mostly ethnic Mon-Khmer tribes and the Hmong, two groups that historically have resisted central Government control, which contributed to the Government's distrust of the LEC.

During the reporting period there were no reports of official interference with or denial of permission to hold religious celebrations in churches, but there were reports that Protestants in some villages were not allowed to hold Christian celebrations in their homes, thus restricting Protestant activities to church buildings only. This was particularly a problem for Protestants who had not been given approval to build church structures in their villages. For example, Protestants in Nakun Village, Bolikhamsai Province, and Xunya Village, Luang Namtha Province, have reportedly been restricted in their ability to hold religious meetings and celebrations in their homes. Protestants in both villages also have not been given approval to build church structures.

Longstanding restrictions on the Catholic Church's operations in the north resulted in the continued existence of only a handful of small congregations in Sayaboury, Bokeo, Luang Namtha, and Vientiane provinces; however, there were signs during the reporting period that the Government was slowly easing its control over the Catholic community in the north. The Government permitted more frequent visits by the Bishop of Luang Prabang to the north to conduct services for the scattered Catholic community there, but it continued to restrict his travel and prevent his residence in Luang Prabang. There were no ordained Catholic priests operating in the north. Several church properties, including a school in Vientiane Municipality, were seized by the Government after 1975 and have not been returned, nor has the Government provided restitution.

The Government prohibited foreigners from proselytizing, although it permitted foreign NGOs with religious affiliations to work in the country. Authorities sometimes seized religious tracts and teaching materials from local Protestants entering the country from abroad and arrested and expelled foreigners attempting to proselytize. In early 2006 two South Koreans were reportedly arrested for proselytizing in Bokeo Province and were expelled.

Although Decree 92 authorized the printing of non-Buddhist religious texts and allowed religious materials to be imported from abroad, it also required permission for such activities from the LFNC. The LFNC did not authorize Christian or Baha'i denominations to print their own religious materials, although both groups have sought permission to do so for several years. Because of these restrictions, some approved Protestant congregations complained of difficulties in obtaining Bibles and other religious materials. The Government has not allowed the Seventh-day Adventists to import Bibles or other religious materials, but the Government did allow the LEC to import a small number of Bibles in early 2007.

During the reporting period, Bibles were confiscated at the Lao-Thai Friendship Bridge from those attempting to import materials for existing congregations. However, there were no reports of arrests associated with these confiscations, as had occurred in past years. Several non-Christian groups indicated that they have not been restricted in bringing religious materials into the country.

The Government generally did not interfere with citizens wishing to travel abroad for short-term religious training. In past years, the Government required that Lao citizens exiting the country receive an exit stamp. This requirement was eliminated in early 2007. Even before the exit stamp requirement was eliminated, many persons of all faiths traveled abroad informally for religious training without obtaining advance permission and without informing authorities of the purpose of their travel. The Ministry of Foreign Affairs usually granted exit visas, but on occasion it refused travel permission to persons going abroad for what it regarded as suspect activities.

Identity cards did not specify religion, nor did family "household registers" or passports, two other important forms of identification. On occasion authorities withheld new ID cards or household registers from Protestants because of their religious beliefs or threatened to withhold official documentation unless they renounced their faith. In 2006 district officials in Houaphan Province reportedly accepted several passport applications from Protestants within their district but subsequently refused to send the applications to the Ministry of Foreign Affairs for processing.

=== Abuses of religious freedom ===
Authorities continued to arrest and detain persons for their religious activities. Detentions that occurred during the reporting period tended to be longer than in 2005-2006. At the end of the period covered by this report, there were four religious prisoners: three in Vientiane Province and one in Oudomsai Province. There was also one abduction of a man in Luang Namtha Province in January 2007 in which religion may have played a role. Additionally, six ethnic Hmong, five males and one adult female, who had been detained in 2005 as part of a group of 27, apparently remained in detention at the end of the reporting period. While religion was not considered the primary reason for their detentions, it was considered to be one factor involved. Conditions in prisons were reportedly harsh; like other prisoners, religious detainees suffered from inadequate food rations, lack of medical care, and cramped quarters.

From late 2006 through the end of the reporting period, Protestants in Xunya Village of Luang Namtha Province have reportedly been restricted in their right to worship by local officials. Following the death of a local member of the Protestant community in March 2007, local officials reportedly refused the community permission to hold a Christian funeral service. In May 2007 the LFNC reportedly gave permission for Christian weddings and funerals to take place in the village, but Protestants are reportedly not allowed to gather for worship services. In January 2007 several Christian families in Long District of Luang Namtha Province and Xiang Kho District of Houaphan Province were reportedly asked to renounce their Christian beliefs by local and district-level officials or leave their villages.

In March 2007 Protestants in Nakun Village of Bolikhamsai Province were reportedly reeducated and asked to sign statements indicating that they had engaged in proselytizing. The Protestants were reported as saying that they had been pressured by local officials in regard to their Christian beliefs and had been reeducated several times. Also in March, several Protestant families in Nam Deua Village of Bolikhamsai Province were reportedly told to give up their religious beliefs and threatened with expulsion from their village. In May 2007 7 of the ten Christian families in Nakun Village were reportedly forced to resettle to another village after refusing to renounce their Protestant beliefs.

In January 2007 Mr. Khamsone Baccam, an ethnic Thai Dam man described as a Protestant leader, was arrested in Oudomsai Province. The Government has been unwilling to acknowledge that he is being held, and multiple requests for information about his status were not answered.

Also in January 2007, Mr. Somphone Khantisouk was abducted from a roadside in Luang Namtha Province, reportedly by local police. While the exact reason for Somphone's abduction is unclear, religion is not considered to be the primary cause. However, some in the religious community have indicated that his perceived religious affiliation may have been one factor involved in his abduction.

Bolikhamsai Province officials indicated in February 2007 that two Buddhist monks had been arrested for being ordained without Government approval and for celebrating inappropriately following the ordination ceremony. The two were reportedly only detained a short time before being released.

In December 2006 five ethnic Yao Protestants were arrested in Luang Namtha Province for constructing a church building without appropriate authorization. The five men were released on January 20, 2007, reportedly after complying with a local official's request that they sign a document renouncing their faith. Since their release, the men have reportedly been closely watched by local officials and have not been allowed to gather for worship services.

In late 2006 several villagers in Luang Namtha Province were reportedly called into a local police station and questioned following a children's performance in the village. Reportedly, local officials incorrectly thought that the performance may have had some relationship to a "foreign religion."

In November 2006 two ethnic Khmu U.S. Legal Permanent Residents who were visiting Khon Khen Village in Vientiane Province were detained after participating in and videotaping a Protestant celebration in the village. The two, a pastor and his wife, were released after three-weeks' detention and payment of a $9,000 fine.

Thirteen ethnic Khmu Protestants in Khon Khen Village were also arrested in November 2006. According to government officials, 1 of the 13 was quickly released after it was discovered that he was a local official. Nine of the 12 other Khmu Protestants were released from a police detention facility on May 16. Three pastors, considered the leaders of the group, remained in prison at the end of the reporting period. The Government has not indicated if there are any charges against the three that remain incarcerated.

In August 2006 two LEC members in Saveth Village, Savannakhet Province, were arrested, reportedly for being outspoken about their faith. The two men were held without charges for several months. Eventually, they were charged with "causing division in society" and sentenced to six months in prison. The two were released on February 9, 2007.

From June through July 2006, a Protestant man in Nam Heng Village of Oudomsai Province was reportedly jailed for possessing ammunition at his residence. According to the LEC, the man had completed his service in the military and did have a small amount of ammunition at his residence, not unusual in remote villages where people engage in hunting. The Protestant community, however, regarded the ammunition as an excuse for his arrest, believing the real reason was local officials' opposition to his Christianity. The man was released in July following payment of a $200 fine.

In April 2006 district officials in Salavan Province arrested an LEC member, Mr. Adern, who refused the village chief's order to recant his faith. He was reportedly from one of four Protestant families that had lived in the village, two of which had reportedly been forced to leave by the time of his arrest. During the first 10 days of house arrest he was reportedly bound with wrist and ankle shackles but was then unshackled and allowed to move freely in his home. Mr. Adern was released from house arrest in July 2006.

In 2005 authorities in Bolikhamsai Province detained a group of 27 ethnic Hmong. The group—all but one minors at the time they were initially detained—were residents at the Petchabun displaced-persons' settlement in northern Thailand, and were irregularly deported back to Laos by Thai authorities who considered them illegal immigrants. Some sources indicated that the group members were Christians and may have been detained in Laos in part due to their religious affiliation. Six of the 27 Hmong were apparently still in detention or otherwise unaccounted for at the end of the reporting period. Complicating this case, the Government had refused to acknowledge it was holding the group of 27 for 15 months and, only in March 2007, did it claim it had "found" the 21 girls from the group. The Government released the girls into the custody of extended family members but did not allow the presence of international observers at the release ceremony. Many of the girls have reportedly returned to Thailand. The Government still has not accounted for the five males and one adult female.

In late 2005 an unapproved LEC Church in Houaysay Noi Village, Bokeo Province, was destroyed by local officials, and six church leaders were arrested. One of the six died while in jail, and the other five were released in early 2006.

In 1999, authorities arrested two members of the Lao Evangelical Church in Oudomsai Province, Mr. Nyoht and Mr. Thongchanh, and charged them with treason and sedition, although their arrests appeared to have been for proselytizing. Nyoht was sentenced to 12 years in prison and Thongchanh to 15 years. In October 2006 Nyoht died while in prison. Thongchanh remained in prison at the end of this reporting period despite appeals that his case be reviewed.

Efforts by local officials to force Protestants to renounce their faith continued in some areas. In some cases, officials threatened religious minorities with arrest or expulsion from their villages if they did not comply.

In January 2007 officials in Long District of Luang Namtha Province and Xiang Kho District of Houaphan Province reportedly threatened several Protestant families with expulsion if they did not renounce their beliefs. In March 2007 officials in Nam Deua District of Bolikhamsai Province also reportedly pressured some Protestants to renounce their beliefs.

Lands belonging to several Protestant families in Nam Heng Village of Oudomsai Province were reportedly confiscated by the village chief and redistributed to other villagers in early 2006. Some other Protestants who had previously resettled to the village were said to have returned to their home province of Phongsaly after being pressured by the village chief. According to Lao officials and the LEC, the land confiscation issue was resolved in mid-2006. Local Protestants in the village indicated in early 2007 that, while opposition to Christianity may have complicated the issue, most of those whose lands were confiscated had moved to Nam Heng Village without Government authorization.

In February 2005 authorities expelled Protestant villagers from Ban Kok Pho Village of Bolikhamsai Province after they refused to renounce their faith.

In early 2005 authorities in Muang Phin District of Savannakhet Province detained 24 ethnic Brou Protestants associated with the LEC at the district police office for several days in order to force their renunciation of faith. All but two of the men recanted their faith. These two men were imprisoned for approximately 1 year but were reportedly released in early 2006.

=== Forced religious conversion ===
Local officials in some areas attempted to force Protestants to renounce their faith; however, there were no reports of explicit forced conversion to another faith during the reporting period. In cases where renunciations occurred, villagers were told by local officials that they would be expelled from their villages if they did not sign documents renouncing their faith. In at least one case, villagers in Nakun Village of Bolikhamsai Province who chose not to renounce their beliefs were reported to have been relocated by local officials. According to Protestants following the incident, village officials had suggested that Protestant villagers convert to Buddhism or to their previously held animist beliefs. The same officials reportedly told villagers that Protestantism is not good because it is an American religion.

There were no reports of forced religious conversion, including of minor U.S. citizens who had been abducted or illegally removed from the United States, or of the refusal to allow such citizens to be returned to the United States.

=== Improvements and Positive Developments in Respect for Religious Freedom ===
The Government's record of respect for religious freedom, particularly in regard to Protestant minorities, continued to be marred by problems at the local level, with incidents of persecution occurring in many provinces. However, some positive steps were taken during the reporting period to address specific religious freedom concerns.

In its official pronouncements in recent years, the Government called for conciliation and equality among religious faiths. The LFNC continued to instruct local officials on religious tolerance. Officials from the LFNC traveled with representatives of the LEC to several provinces to promote better understanding between LEC congregations and local officials.

The LEC continued to conduct an active program of public service during this reporting period, providing developmental assistance and organizing social welfare projects in several areas that had previously experienced religious intolerance. In conjunction with the LFNC, the LEC continued to conduct meetings with officials and Protestants in some villages where there had been religious tensions.

On May 6, 2007 the LEC opened a Sports and Vocational Training Center in Vientiane Municipality on a piece of property that had been confiscated by the Government several years earlier. The land was returned to the LEC contingent on the Center being made available for use by Lao athletes to prepare for the 2009 South East Asian Games.

In early 2007 church members in Houaysay Noi Village, Bokeo Province, were given approval to meet in a house church. The village had previously experienced problems, when in late 2005, an unapproved LEC Church in Houaysay Noi Village was destroyed by local officials, and six church leaders were arrested. One of the six died while in jail, and the other five were released in early 2006.

In the past, local officials in some areas obstructed Christian congregations' observance of religious holidays such as Christmas. Church officials indicated that Christmas activities at recognized religious venues in 2006 were less restricted than in 2005, particularly in Vientiane Municipality.

Churches that had previously been closed were allowed to reopen in some provinces in 2006. The Government permitted the reopening of four LEC churches in Bolikhamsai Province that were officially closed in past years, including a church in Khamsan Village that had been closed since 2003. Officials in Muang Feuang District of Vientiane Province granted permission for LEC members to reconstruct a destroyed church in Phone Ngam Village in late 2005, and the church has since reopened. During the reporting period, there were no reported LEC church closures.

In contrast to the past policy of denying all such requests, several provinces also permitted some Christian congregations to expand or renovate long-standing churches. In 2006 Catholics were permitted to construct two rural churches in Vientiane Province. Catholic communities had existed in both villages for more than 10 years.

In June 2006 authorities permitted the Catholic Church to conduct an ordination in Vientiane Municipality along with the ordination of a deacon in Champassak Province. This marked the first Catholic ordinations in the country since 1975.

The ordination in Vientiane Municipality was initially scheduled to take place in late 2005 in Bolikhamsai Province; however, the Government blocked it. In December 2006 the Government allowed the ordination of three additional Catholic priests in Vientiane Municipality. Approval for the ordinations represented improvements over past restrictions.

The small Seventh-day Adventist Church, confined to a handful of congregations in Vientiane Municipality and Bolikhamsai, Bokeo, Champassak, Luang Prabang, and Xiengkhoug provinces, reported no significant Government interference in its activities in recent years, and its members appeared to be free to practice their faith.

In late 2006 the Baha'is were able, with assistance from the Lao Front for National Construction, to reclaim two pieces of property in Vientiane and Khammouane provinces that had been seized by the Government in 1975. In 2006 the Government officially approved land for the establishment of four new Baha'i centers, two in Vientiane Municipality, one in Vientiane Province, and one in Savannakhet Province. While the land approval has been granted, the Baha'i have not yet received all required paperwork from the District Land Offices and have not yet requested approval to begin construction of the new centers. Additionally, in June 2006 the Government gave official approval for Baha'is to use land where they already have a cemetery.

Baha'i local spiritual assemblies and the National Spiritual Assembly routinely held Baha'i 19-day feasts and celebrated all holy days. The Baha'i National Spiritual Assembly in Vientiane met regularly and has sent delegations to the Universal House of Justice in Mount Carmel, in Haifa, Israel. Visitors from sister congregations in Malaysia have visited the Baha'i Center in Vientiane.

== Societal abuses and discrimination ==
For the most part, the various religious communities coexist amicably. Society places importance on harmonious relations, and the dominant Buddhist faith generally is tolerant of other religious practices. There has been no ecumenical movement to date. Local cultural mores generally instilled respect for longstanding, well-known differences in belief. However, interreligious tensions arose on rare occasions within some minority ethnic groups, particularly in response to proselytizing or disagreements over rights to village resources. Efforts of some congregations to establish churches independent of the LEC or associated with denominations based abroad led to some tensions within the Protestant community. Frictions also have arisen over the refusal of some members of minority religious groups, particularly Protestants, to participate in Buddhist or animist religious ceremonies.

In December 2005 an LEC pastor, Mr. Aroun Varaphong, was killed in Bolikhamsai Province after preaching at a pre-Christmas service. There is no evidence that a serious investigation into his killing was ever conducted.

== See also ==
- Religion in Laos
- Human rights in Laos
