= Daniel A. Clune =

American ambassador

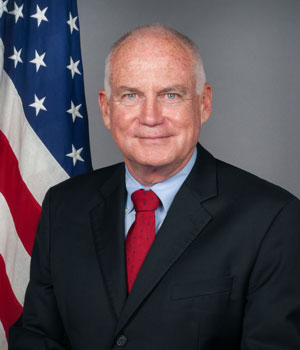

Daniel Anthony Clune (born 1949) is an American foreign service officer who served as US Ambassador to Laos from 2013 to 2016.

Clune is a graduate of Boston College and Boalt Hall School of Law, the law school at the University of California at Berkeley. He practiced law for ten years in Chicago before joining the Foreign Service in 1985.

Clune served as the Principal Deputy Assistant Secretary in the Bureau of Oceans and International Environmental and Scientific Affairs from 2010 to 2012. From 2007 to 2010, he was Deputy Chief of Mission and Chargé d'Affaires at the U.S Embassy in Canberra, Australia. From 2005 to 2007, he was the director of the U.S. State Department's Office of Monetary Affairs and served as Head of the U.S. Delegation to the Paris Club. He served as Director of the State Department's Office of Economic Policy and Public Diplomacy and as Deputy Chief of Mission and Chargé d'Affaires at the U.S. Embassy in Nassau. He has also worked as the Trade Advisor at the U.S. Mission to the OECD, spent a year at the Office of the U.S. Trade Representative as Director of Middle East and Mediterranean Affairs and served at U.S. embassies in Lima, Peru and Jakarta, Indonesia.

Clune presented his credentials as Ambassador to Laos on November 7, 2013, and served until September 17, 2016.

== Personal life ==
Clune has been married to Judy Clune, an artist, and has three daughters.

Diplomatic posts
Preceded by Karen B. Stewart	United States Ambassador to Laos; 2013–2016	Succeeded by Rena Bitter
