= Peter Haymond =

American diplomat

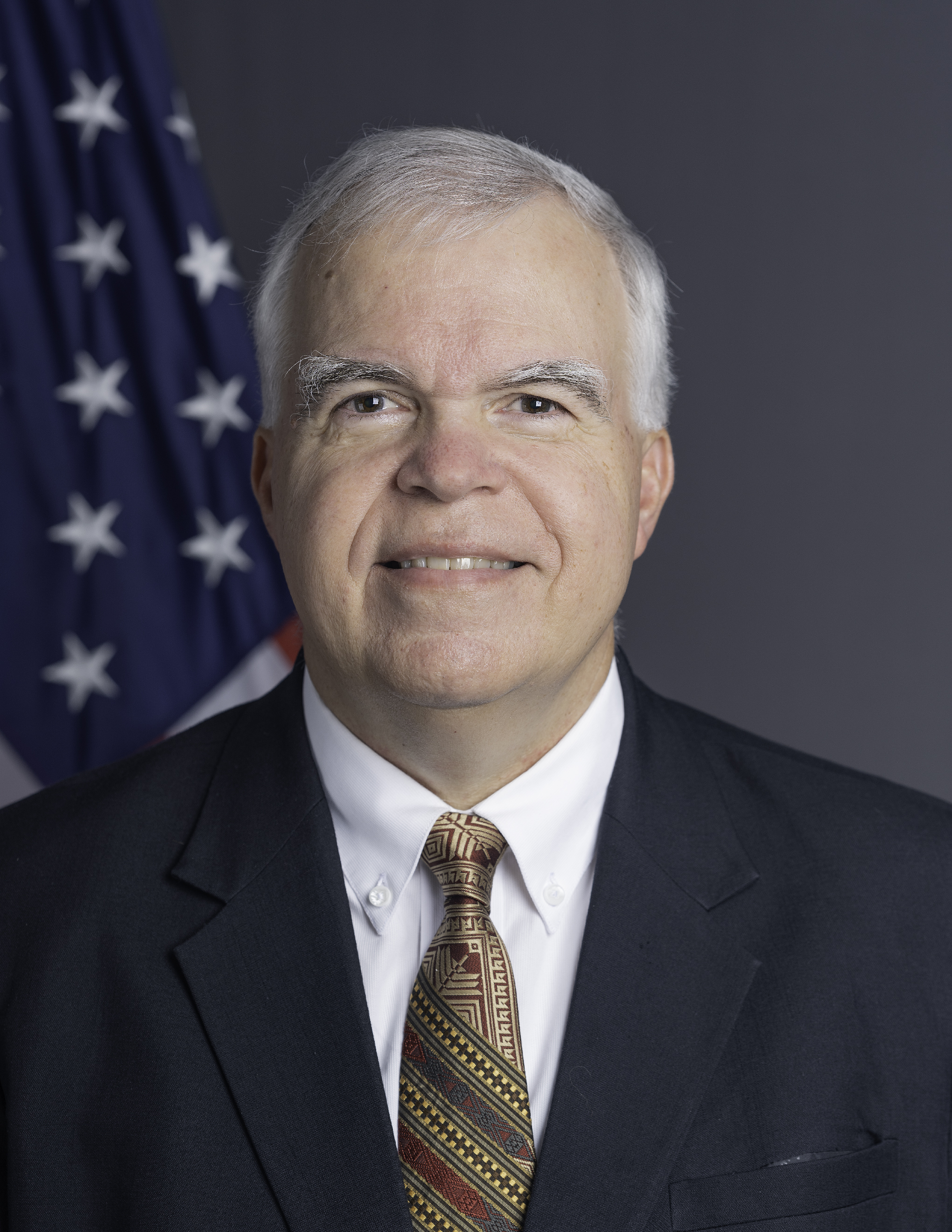

United States Ambassador to Laos
- In office February 7, 2020 – September 1, 2023
- President: Donald Trump; Joe Biden
- Preceded by: Rena Bitter
- Succeeded by: Heather Variava

U.S. Chargé d'Affaires to Indonesia
- In office June 15, 2025 – June 30, 2026
- President: Donald Trump
- Preceded by: Kamala Shirin Lakhdhir
- Succeeded by: Joy Michiko Sakurai

Personal details
- Born: Peter Mark Haymond Seattle, U.S.
- Education: Brigham Young University (B.A.); Fletcher School of Law and Diplomacy (M.A.L.D., Ph.D.)

Peter Mark Haymond is an American diplomat who served as the United States Ambassador to Laos from February 2020 to September 2023. He had served as the United States Chargé d'affaires to Indonesia from June 2025 to June 2026.

== Early life and education ==
Haymond earned a Bachelor of Arts from Brigham Young University and a Master of Arts in Law and Diplomacy and Doctor of Philosophy from the Fletcher School of Law and Diplomacy at Tufts University.

== Career ==
Haymond is a career member of the Senior Foreign Service, class of Minister-Counselor, joining the Foreign Service in 1991. Previous posts include being Director of the State Department's Office of Chinese and Mongolian Affairs, Consul General at the United States Consulate in Chengdu, China, and Deputy Chief of Mission at the United States Embassy in Vientiane, Laos. He also served as Division Chief in the Office of Energy and Commodities in the Bureau of Economic and Energy Affairs at the Department of State, and as Arabian Peninsula Officer in the Office of the Counterterrorism Coordinator. He recently served as Chargé d’Affaires at the United States Embassy in Bangkok, Thailand.

On September 3, 2019, President Trump nominated Haymond to be the next United States Ambassador to Laos. His nomination was sent to the United States Senate on September 9, 2019. He appeared before the Foreign Relations Committee on October 31, 2019. On December 19, 2019, his nomination was confirmed in the Senate by voice vote. He was sworn in on January 15, 2020, and presented his credentials to Laotian President Bounnhang Vorachit in Vientiane on February 7, 2020.

Haymond arrived at the US Embassy in Jakarta on June 15, 2025 to lead the US Mission to Indonesia as Chargé d’Affaires ad interim. A year later, the embassy announced that Haymond would conclude his service on June 30, 2026, with Joy Michiko Sakurai, previously chargé d’Affaires ad interim, as his replacement.

== Personal life ==
Haymond is married to his wife of over 30 years, Dusadee. He speaks Lao, Thai, Mandarin, and French.

== See also ==
- List of ambassadors of the United States
- List of ambassadors appointed by Donald Trump

Diplomatic posts
Preceded by Rena Bitter	United States Ambassador to Laos; 2020–2023	Succeeded by Heather Variava
