= Rena Bitter =

American diplomat (born 1964)

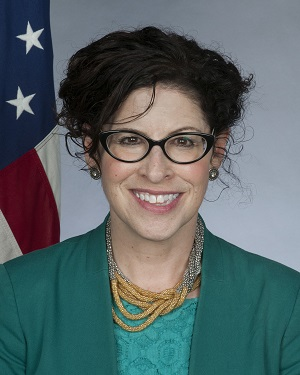

16th Assistant Secretary of State for Consular Affairs
- In office August 12, 2021 – January 20, 2025
- President: Joe Biden
- Preceded by: Carl Risch
- Succeeded by: Mora Namdar

United States Ambassador to Laos
- In office November 1, 2016 – January 26, 2020
- President: Barack Obama; Donald Trump
- Preceded by: Daniel A. Clune
- Succeeded by: Peter Haymond

Personal details
- Born: Rena Elizabeth Bitter; March 23, 1964 (age 62)
- Education: Northwestern University (BS); Southern Methodist University (JD)

Rena Elizabeth Bitter is an American diplomat who served as the United States Ambassador to Laos from 2016 to 2020 and Assistant Secretary of State for Consular Affairs from 2021 to 2025.

== Early life and education ==
Bitter grew up in Dallas, Texas, one of three children of Frieda and Herb Bitter. She received her Bachelor of Science degree from Northwestern University in 1986 and a Juris Doctor from the Dedman School of Law at Southern Methodist University in 1991.

== Career ==
Bitter began her career in the U.S. Foreign Service in 1994. She served on the Department of State's Executive Secretariat Staff from 2000 to 2001, and served as a Special Assistant in the Office of the Secretary of State from 2001 to 2002. After that she served in London from 2002 to 2003 as a Transatlantic Diplomatic Fellow, and then as Chief of the Nonimmigrant Visa Unit in the Consular Section there. In her next assignment, Bitter was Consular Section Chief at the U.S. Embassy in Amman, Jordan from 2006 to 2009. She then returned to domestic assignments at the Department of State's Operations Center from 2009 to 2012. As a result of her role in operations, Bitter was called as a witness in the court-martial of Bradley Manning (later Chelsea Manning), a United States Army soldier who was subsequently convicted in July 2013 of violations of the Espionage Act and other offenses, after disclosing to WikiLeaks nearly 750,000 classified, or unclassified but sensitive, military and diplomatic documents.

From 2012 until she became Ambassador to Laos, Bitter served as Consul General at the U.S. Consulate General in Ho Chi Minh City, Vietnam. She presented her credentials on November 1, 2016. Her mission terminated on January 26, 2020.

On April 21, 2021, President Joe Biden announced Bitter as the nominee to be the Assistant Secretary of State for Consular Affairs. Her nomination was sent to the Senate on April 28, 2021, and confirmed by voice vote on August 9, 2021.

== Personal life ==
Bitter speaks Spanish, Arabic and Vietnamese.
