= David Heywood Swartz =

American diplomat (1942–2026)

David Heywood Swartz (March 3, 1942 – February 11, 2026) was an American diplomat who served as the U.S. Ambassador to Belarus, after having served as chargé d'affaires.

== Life and career ==
Heywood was born in Chicago, Illinois, on March 3, 1942. He graduated from Southwestern College (B.A., 1964) and Florida State University (M.A., 1966) and Canadian Defense College in Kingston, Ontario, Canada (1982–1983).

When he was appointed Ambassador in 1992, it was “a new position.” Swartz served until 1994. Swartz “resigned ...his post ... in protest against the Clinton administration's coddling of the Minsk regime.“ He previously served as dean of the School of Language Studies at the Foreign Service Institute (1989–91), staff director at the Nuclear Risk Reduction Center (1988–89) and consul general in Calgary, Alberta, Canada (1983–84) and in Zurich, Switzerland (1980– 82).

Swartz died on February 11, 2026, at the age of 83.
