= Mary Jesse =

American technology and media business executive

- Born: San Jose, California, U.S.
- Education: B.S. in Electrical Engineering
- Alma mater: University of Utah
- Occupations: Technology executive, entrepreneur, inventor
- Employer(s): ACME Brains, Inc.; MTI
- Known for: CEO of ACME Brains, Inc.; wireless pioneer; co-founder of AT&T Project Angel
- Title: Chairman of MTI; CEO of ACME Brains

Mary Jesse is an American technology and media business executive. Jesse is CEO of AI startup ACME Brains, Inc.

Jesse is an executive, entrepreneur, strategist, inventor, professional electrical engineer, author, and wireless pioneer.

Jesse co-founded AT&T's Project Angel, a fixed wireless local loop project that contributed to AT&T's acquisition of McCaw cellular and the creation of AT&T wireless where she served as a vice-president and corporate officer.

Jesse is the past CEO and current chairman of the board at MTI.

Jesse is a mentor for the Creative Destruction Lab whose mission is "to enhance the commercialization of science for the betterment of humankind."

== Early life ==
=== Childhood ===
Jesse is a native of San Jose, California. Her father spent his entire career working as an electrical engineer on NASA Space Programs at Ames Research Center, and was part of the Pioneer 10 team that received the Nelson P. Jackson Aerospace Award.

== Career ==
A native of Northern California, Jesse began her career as an electrical engineering research associate at the University of Utah working with Om Gandi on setting the first standards for exposure to radio waves from electronic devices. During this period, she published her thesis entitled "Measurement of the Complex Permittivity of Biological Samples at Millimeter Wavelengths".

Jesse currently serves as chairman of the board and past chief executive officer of MTI founded in 1977 a mid-market, privately held provider of security and display hardware, Internet of things software and global services in retail, healthcare, quick serve restaurant (QSR) and hospitality. In May 2025, Jesse was appointed as a Strategic Advisor at PlayyON.

In July 2025, Jesse was announced as Founder and CEO of Seattle-based AI startup, ACME Brains, Inc.

=== Diversity and women leadership ===
Jesse is an alumna of and mentor for Springboard Enterprises.

Jesse is an alumna of and mentor for Onboarding Women, a program developed by Deloitte, PerkinsCoie, Madrona Venture Fund and Spencer Stuart that seeks to increase the number of women on boards.
