= Douglas A. Hartwick =

American diplomat

Douglas Alan Hartwick
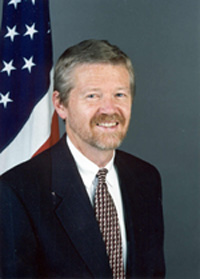

United States Ambassador to Laos
- In office 2001–2004
- Preceded by: Wendy Chamberlin
- Succeeded by: Patricia M. Haslach

Personal details
- Born: July 29, 1950 Miles City, Montana
- Died: May 22, 2025 (aged 74) Charlottesville, Virginia
- Spouse: Regina Hartwick
- Occupation: Business and NGO consultant, lecturer, former diplomat

Douglas Alan Hartwick (July 29, 1950 – May 22, 2025) was a business and NGO consultant, lecturer, and former senior U.S. diplomat and U.S. ambassador to Laos (2001–2004).

Hartwick was born in Miles City, Montana in June 1950. He obtained his B.A. in Government from the College of William and Mary in 1972, a M.A. in Economics from Washington State University in 1976, an M.S. in Applied Economics from Stanford University in 1985 and an M.S. in National Strategic Studies from the National Defense University (National War College) in 1994.

He was a Trustee for The Mountain Institute, a member of the Diplomatic Council of the World Heritage Fund and member of the Board of Advisors of William and Mary's Thomas Jefferson Program in Public Policy.

== Career ==
Joining the U.S. Foreign Service in 1977, Hartwick served overseas in Africa (Niger and Central African Republic); India twice (1986–90 and 1994–97), where he was responsible for the embassy's economic and later science portfolios; and Malaysia from 1990-93 as economic counselor. He served as U.S. Ambassador to Laos from 2001-2004. At the State Department in Washington, Hartwick served as special assistant to the Under Secretary for Economic and Business Affairs, energy officer in the Bureau of Economic and Business Affairs, and as Office Director for Philippines, Indonesia, Malaysia, Brunei and Singapore.

Hartwick attended the Department of Defense's National War College 1993-1994 and the Capstone Program in May, 2001 at the National Defense University at Ft. McNair, Washington, D.C..

In January 2005, Hartwick was named Senior Coordinator for Tsunami Reconstruction and led State's Task Force on Tsunami assistance. In August 2005, he assumed his duties as International Advisor to the Commandant of the Industrial College of the Armed Forces (ICAF) and as economics faculty member. In January 2006, Hartwick was named United States Assistant Trade Representative for South and Southwest Asian Affairs.

In October 2007, Hartwick joined Lockheed Martin Corporation as chief executive of Lockheed Martin new subsidiary Lockheed Martin India (Pvt. Ltd) from January 2008 until June 2009. In July 2009 he became Special Advisor to Lockheed Martin until December 2009.

== Ambassador to Laos ==
Hartwick's tenure in Laos 2001-2004 focused on addressing human rights concerns, protecting religious freedom, search and recovery of remains of missing Americans from the Indochina war and restoring normal trade relations (NTR) between the United States and Laos. In 2003, he signed the first bilateral trade agreement between the United States and Laos since the Vietnam War. During his tenure, he worked closely with the Hmong-American communities in Minnesota and California and was voted "Man of the Year 2003" by the editors of the online periodical Vientiane Times. In 2004, he was awarded the National League of Families League Award for Sustained Effort and Dedication for his work in Laos.

== Senior Coordinator for Tsunami Reconstruction ==
Hartwick helped lead the State Department's and interagency efforts to provide humanitarian and reconstruction assistance to countries devastated by the 2004 tsunami. He accompanied former Presidents George H.W Bush and Bill Clinton to the region in February 2005 to investigate the damage and needs of concerned countries.

== U.S. Assistant Trade Representative for South and Southwest Asia ==
Hartwick assumed his duties at USTR in January 2006 until his retirement in September 2007. He participated in establishment of the U.S.-India Trade Policy Forum and chaired annual meetings of Trade and Investment Framework Agreements with Pakistan and Afghanistan.

== Lockheed Martin (India) Pvt. Ltd. ==
Hartwick represented Lockheed Martin in India from January 2008 until June 2009 as chief executive of its India subsidiary. Lockheed's first major India sale, 6 C-130Js, were signed during Hartwick's tenure. Hartwick returned to Washington in July 2009 and assumed an advisory role with the corporation until completing his term in December 2009.

== Board membership ==
Hartwick was a board member of the Phoenix Committee for Foreign Relations and co-chaired PCFR's Program Committee since 2017. He was a board member of the Legacies of War NGO since September 2017. He served on The Mountain Institute board from January 2010 until end of 2012. He served on the Diplomatic Council of the Global Heritage Foundation until December 2012. He also served as a board member of the College of William & Mary's Thomas Jefferson program on Public Policy from 2006 until 2012.

== Death ==
Douglas Hartwick died in Charlottesville, Virginia on May 22, 2025.

Diplomatic posts
Preceded by Wendy Chamberlin	United States Ambassador to Laos; 2001–2004	Succeeded by Patricia M. Haslach
