= Jenifer H. Moore =

American diplomat

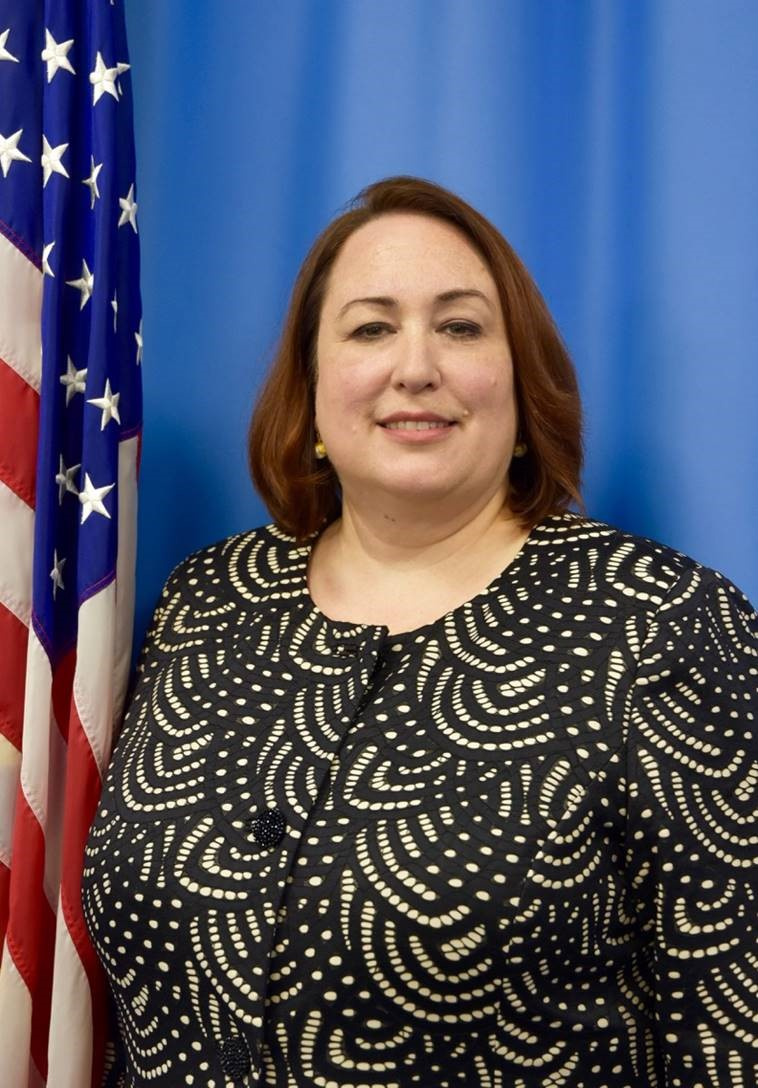

United States Ambassador to Belarus (acting)
- In office August 17, 2018 – July 27, 2020
- President: Donald Trump
- Preceded by: Robert J. Riley
- Succeeded by: Jeffrey Giauque

Jenifer H. Moore is a career member of the U.S. Foreign Service had served as Chargé d'Affaires at the U.S. Embassy in Minsk, Belarus from August 2018 to July 2020.

Moore was the acting ambassador to Belarus, as one could not be appointed due to tensions between the two nations. Moore's term as ambassador ended on July 27, 2020.

== Education ==
Moore graduated from the Georgia Institute of Technology with a Bachelor and Master of Science degrees in International Affairs and a Master of Science degree in public policy.
