= Ethan A. Goldrich =

American Career Foreign Service Officer (born 1966)

Ethan Aaron Goldrich (born 1966) is an American Career Foreign Service Officer who was Chargé d'Affaires in Belarus from June 2013 until June 27, 2014. Goldrich has also served as Director of the State Department Office of Caucasus Affairs and Regional Conflicts and Deputy Director of the Office of United Nations Political Affairs.

In a series of retaliations based on the passage of the 2004 Belarus Democracy Act, Belarus has decreased the size of the Embassy from 35 diplomats to five and Goldrich has had to work with those limitations. One solution is the effective use of local staff. But that doesn't mean the locals can do everything so things like the like getting visas has been more difficult due to the lack of American staffers. An issue the Ambassador has worked on with the Belarusians has been improving their ranking on the Trafficking in Persons Report required by the U.S. Trafficking and Victims Protection Act.

When a United Arab Emirates businessman, Ahmed al-Menhali, was handcuffed while in Cleveland, Ohio to receive medical treatment (the sister of a woman working in the hotel called to say Ahmed al-Menhali had sworn allegiance to the Islam State), the UAE government summoned Goldrich, then the U.S. Deputy Chief of Mission in Abu Dhabi.

Goldrich completed his bachelor's degree at Cornell University in 1988 and completed the Weinberg Fellowship Program and received a master's degree from Princeton University in 2001.
