= Jonathan M. Moore =

American diplomat (born 1966)

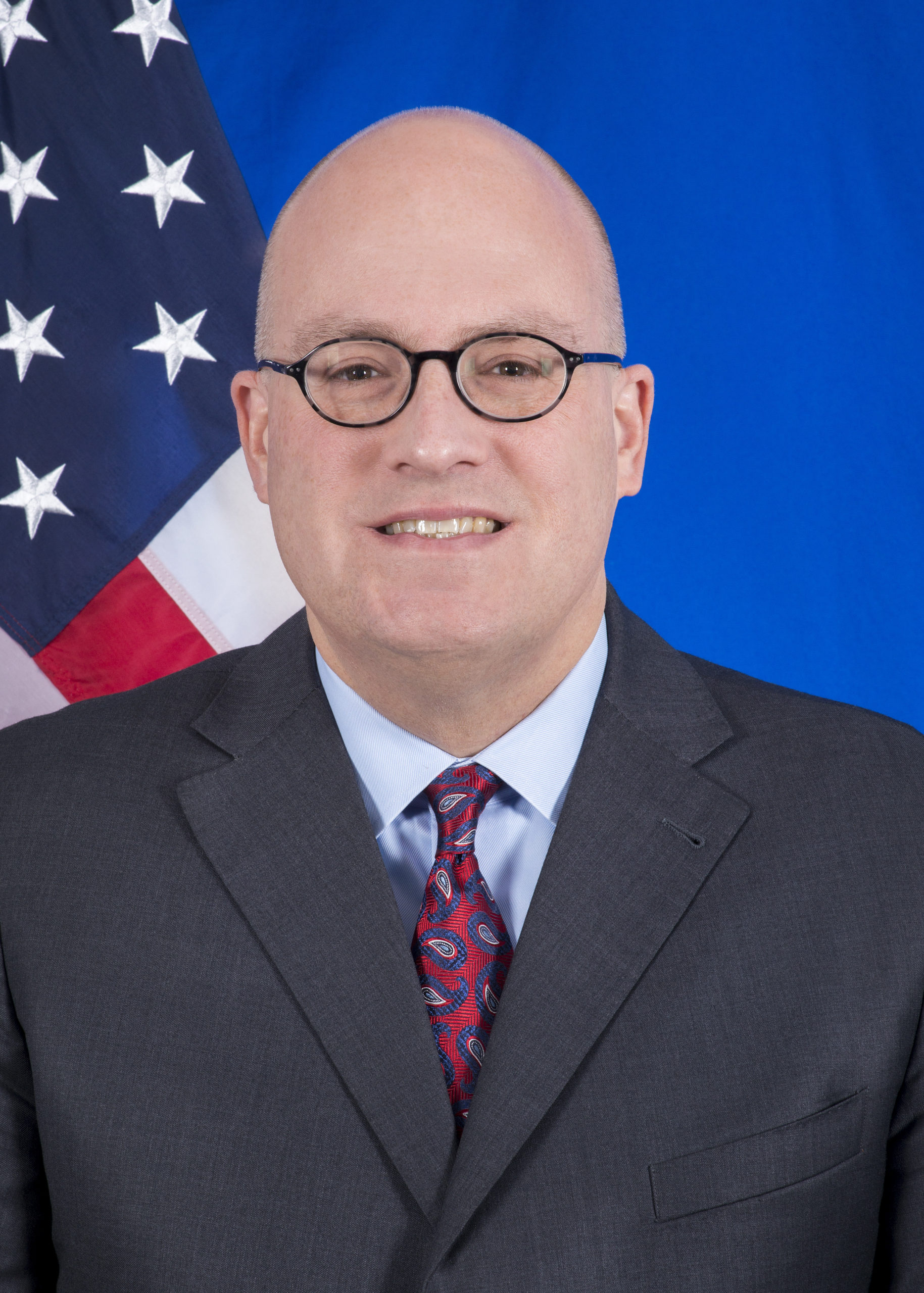

Coordinator, Health Incident Response Task Force, U.S. Department of State
- In office November 15, 2021 – July 28, 2023
- President: Joe Biden
- Secretary: Antony Blinken

Acting Assistant Secretary of State for Oceans and International Environmental and Scientific Affairs
- In office September 8, 2020 – January 20, 2021
- President: Donald Trump
- Preceded by: Judith G. Garber (Acting)
- Succeeded by: Marcia Bernicat (Acting)

Acting Assistant Secretary of State for International Organization Affairs
- In office November 29, 2019 – March 1, 2020
- President: Donald Trump
- Preceded by: Kevin Moley
- Succeeded by: Pamela D. Pryor (Acting)

Personal details
- Born: 1966 (age 59–60) New Brunswick, New Jersey, U.S.
- Education: American University (B.A.); George Washington University (M.A.)

Jonathan Michael Moore (born 1966) is a retired career U.S. diplomat. An officer of the Senior Foreign Service with the rank of Minister-Counselor, he served as the Coordinator of the Health Incident Response Task Force at the U.S. Department of State from November 2021 until his retirement in 2023.

== Career ==
Ambassador Moore joined the U.S. Foreign Service in 1990 and was assigned to the Embassy in Belgrade in 1991. He was a desk officer for the former Yugoslavia from 1993 to 1995, and was the Political/Economic Section Chief of the U.S. Embassy in Lithuania from 1995 to 1999. After an assignment as a Congressional Fellow in the Policy Office of the Speaker of the United States House of Representatives, he was the Deputy Director of the U.S. State Department’s Office of Russian Affairs from 2000 until 2002, serving as Acting Director for several months in early 2002. He then worked as Deputy Chief of Mission of the U.S. Embassy in Namibia from 2002 to 2005.

Moore was a 2005-06 National Security Affairs Fellow at Stanford University’s Hoover Institution.

Moore was Deputy Chief of Mission at the U.S. Embassy in Belarus in 2006-08, and was Chargé d’Affaires there in 2008-09. He was U.S. Deputy Chief of Mission in Bosnia and Herzegovina from 2009-12.

After serving as the Director of the State Department's Office of South Central European Affairs, responsible for Albania, Bosnia and Herzegovina, Croatia, Kosovo, Montenegro, North Macedonia, and Serbia, Moore was the Ambassador and Head of the OSCE Mission to Bosnia and Herzegovina from 2014 to 2017.

Upon his return to Washington, D.C., Moore held several positions, including Senior Advisor for Europe and Eurasia for the U.S. Mission to the United Nations from September to November 2018; Principal Deputy Assistant Secretary and Acting Assistant Secretary of State for International Organization Affairs from November 2018 to March 2020; and Acting Assistant Secretary, Senior Bureau Official, and Principal Deputy Assistant Secretary of State for Oceans and International Environmental and Scientific Affairs from April 2020 to November 2021.

In November 2021, Moore was named by Secretary of State Antony Blinken as Coordinator of the Health Incident Response Task Force which coordinates "the Department and interagency’s response to anomalous health incidents for personnel and dependents".

Following his retirement, Moore joined the lobbying firm Lucas Compton in Washington, D.C., having for clients, among others, the Government of Republika Srpska that pays him $30,000 per month since February 2026, for which he has been criticized by Bosnian media and politicians, including Emir Suljagić, director of the Srebrenica Genocide Memorial.

== Awards ==
Moore has received multiple awards, including a Presidential Rank Award, the State Department's Distinguished Honor Award, Superior Honor Award, and Meritorious Honor Award, and the American Foreign Service Association's Sinclaire Award for language proficiency. He has been decorated by the presidents of Albania and Lithuania, receiving the "Gjergj Kastrioti Skënderbeu" Decoration, the Order of the Lithuanian Grand Duke Gediminas and the Order for Merits to Lithuania.

== Education ==
Moore is a graduate of American University’s School of International Service and holds a master's degree from George Washington University’s Elliott School of International Affairs.

== Personal ==
In addition to English, Moore speaks Bosnian, Serbian, Croatian, and Lithuanian, and is conversant in Danish, German, and Russian.
