= Ravic R. Huso =

Retired American diplomat

Ravic R. Huso is a retired American diplomat who served as Ambassador to Laos from 2007 until 2010.

== Education ==
In 1973, Huso graduated from the College of Idaho and earned a Master's Degree in International Relations from the University of Virginia in 1976. The State Department sent him to the United States Army War College where he graduated with the Class of 1993. Huso died on February 21, 2026, due to complications from Parkinsons. His wife Barbara and daughter Natalie were with him when he died.
