= Victor L. Tomseth =

American diplomat (born 1941)

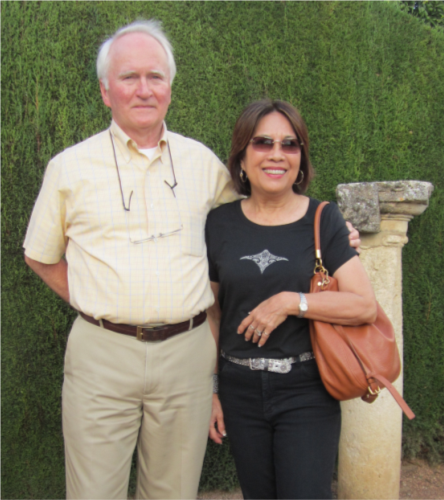
- Victor and Wallapa Tomseth, 2012
- Born: April 14, 1941 (age 85); Eugene, Oregon
- Occupation: Diplomat
- Children: Christopher, Aranya

Victor L. Tomseth (born April 14, 1941) is a former American diplomat and U.S. Ambassador (1993–1996) to Laos. He was Deputy Chief of Mission in Tehran, Iran and was among the Americans taken hostage by the Iranians from 1979 to 1981.

== Early life and education ==
Tomseth was born in Eugene, Oregon, the son of Hersey F. and Lyla I. (Currant) Tomseth. He is married to Wallapa Charoenrath, born in Thailand, and the couple have two children. He graduated from the University of Oregon in 1963 with a bachelor's degree in history and received a master's degree in history from the University of Michigan in 1966. He also attended Cornell University in 1973. Tomseth was a Peace Corps volunteer in Nepal in 1964–1965.

== Department of State ==
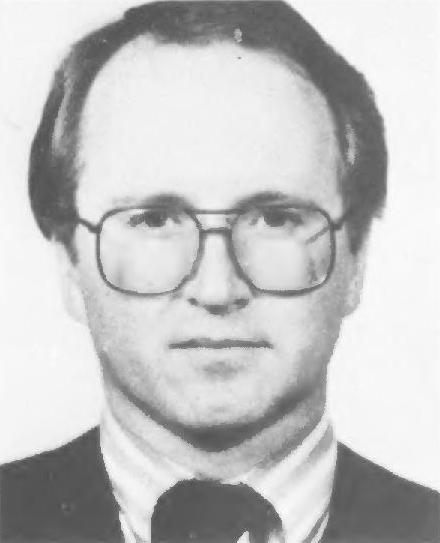
Tomseth pictured before his captivity in Iran

Tomseth was employed by the U.S. Department of State from 1966 until 1996. He served abroad in Thailand, Iran, Sri Lanka, and Laos. He was appointed U.S. Ambassador to Laos in November 1993 and served until August 1996.

== Hostage of the Iranians ==
Tomseth served as American Consul in Shiraz, Iran from 1976 to 1979 and was Deputy Chief of Mission of the U.S. Embassy in Iran when the American employees of the Embassy were taken hostage by Iranian students on November 4, 1979. Tomseth, Ambassador Bruce Laingen, and Security Officer Mike Howland were at the Iranian Foreign Ministry when the students stormed the Embassy. They were held under house arrest in the Foreign Ministry for the duration of the crisis. At first they were treated as diplomats and were able to have some contact with Washington and the outside world. Later, their treatment deteriorated and they were locked in their living spaces.

During the early days of their incarceration, Tomseth talked on the telephone to his Thai cook in Tehran, Somchai Sriweawnetr. Speaking Thai, which his Iranian captors did not understand, Tomseth requested that Somchai hide five Americans who had escaped the Embassy. Somchai arranged for the Americans to be sheltered in the Canadian Embassy and in what was called the Canadian Caper the five plus one additional American diplomat were helped by the Canadians to escape the country on January 27, 1980. This incident was later dramatized in the movie Argo.

== Later career ==
Tomseth retired from the Department of State in September 1996. From 1998 to 2000 he was employed with the rank of Ambassador by the Organization for Security and Cooperation in Europe serving as Deputy Head of Mission for Croatia and the Chief of a Task Force for Rapid Expert Assistance and Cooperation Teams (REACT). In 2001 he became an independent consultant contracted by Booz Allen Hamilton to participate in military exercises with the United States Pacific Command headquarters.

== See also ==
- Ambassadors of the United States
- List of kidnappings
