= India–Pacific Islands relations =

International relations

India

Oceania

International relations exist between the nation of India and the Pacific Island Nations.

Relations between the nations are shaped by militaristic national security issues, as well as by environmental issues. In 2022, a diplomatic push by China to expand military bases and increase economic and political influence in the south pacific; was closely watched by India. This is in part because pacific island nations exist in a region with maritime borders that overlap sea lanes important for world trade.

== Overview ==
India has sought stronger ties and influence with Pacific Island Countries since at least 2014, after establishing the Forum for India-Pacific Islands Cooperation. It has participated in technological diplomatic efforts in those countries in the fields of natural disasters, solar power, electrification, among other areas. India has also opened a space research and satellite monitoring station in the Fiji islands.

In May 2023, India's Prime Minister Narendra Modi visited Papua New Guinea for the purpose of visiting leaders of Pacific Island countries as part of the . India first hosted a meeting of that forum in 2015. In Port Moresby Modi met with leaders of Vanuatu at the Port Moresby summit. The visit was partly motivated for reasons that India had concerns regarding potential naval bases, and Chinese control of ocean resources in the Pacific Island region. Indian engagement with pacific island nations has been described as having 'enormous potential to transform local economies' by the Australian Strategic Policy Institute.

The pacific island nations have been a prominent topic in discussions of the Quadrilateral Security Dialogue that India is a part of.

Although India maintained diplomatic relations with several Pacific Island countries following their independence in the 1970s and 1980s, engagement remained limited for several decades because of geographical distance and modest economic ties. India's interaction with the region was primarily conducted through multilateral forums such as the United Nations and the Pacific Islands Forum, where India became a Dialogue Partner in 2002. Bilateral engagement expanded significantly during the 2010s under India's Act East Policy, culminating in the establishment of the Forum for India–Pacific Islands Cooperation (FIPIC) in 2014 to institutionalize regular high-level dialogue with the fourteen Pacific Island countries.

=== Climate change diplomacy ===
Pacific island nations regularly advocates in international forums for the reduction in greenhouse gas emissions from large economies such as the United States, China, and India. One particularly strong advocate is Vanuatu, motivated in part by the fact that Vanuatu is one of the most vulnerable nations in the world to the effects of climate change. A call by Vanuatu's president Nikenike Vurobaravu to develop a 'fossil-fuel non-proliferation treaty' was criticised by Indian commentators as 'misplaced in intent and purpose'; claiming that it would deter Indian development. India's position is that coal should only be 'phased down' and not 'phased out'.

In response to India's protesting the language of the resolutions at the Glasgow climate conference, the Alliance of Small Island States attempted to make fossil fuel elimination a part of national climate plans at COP27.

Opposition also emerged between India and pacific island nations during the Bonn conference.

Climate change has become a central area of cooperation between India and Pacific Island countries, many of which are among the world's most vulnerable states to sea-level rise and extreme weather events. India has supported climate adaptation, disaster resilience, renewable energy deployment, and sustainable development initiatives in the Pacific through bilateral assistance and multilateral platforms such as the International Solar Alliance. India has also emphasized cooperation with Pacific Island countries on issues relating to Small Island Developing States (SIDS) during international climate negotiations.

== Nation-specific relations ==
=== Fiji ===
Relations between India and Fiji are strong, for a number of historical reasons. Some of these include the fact that 38% of people in Fiji are of ethnic Indian descent, known as Indo-Fijians. Mahendra Chaudhry became the country's first Indo-Fijian prime minister in 1999. Indians were first introduced to Fiji in the 1880s. Soon after, many indentured servants came to the island for work, some of whom stayed.

=== Vanuatu ===
As part of its diplomatic push for influence in the pacific island region, India provided cyclone relief to Vanuatu when tropical cyclone Hola hit the country in 2017.

Vanuatu advocates in international forums for the reduction in greenhouse gas emissions from large economies such as the United States, China, and India. This is motivated in part by the fact that Vanuatu is one of the most vulnerable nations in the world to the effects of climate change. A call by Vanuatu's president Nikenike Vurobaravu to develop a 'fossil-fuel non-proliferation treaty' was criticised by Indian commentators as 'misplaced in intent and purpose'; claiming that it would deter Indian development. India's position is that coal should only be 'phased down' and not 'phased out'. Vanuatu has been described as representative of a "a strong and vocal group of small island-developing states whose voice is heard with attention and empathy in the UN. More so, when it is a matter that will affect the global discourse on climate change" in Indian news publications such as The Hindu.

Vanuatu has been described as representative of a "a strong and vocal group of small island-developing states whose voice is heard with attention and empathy in the UN. More so, when it is a matter that will affect the global discourse on climate change" in Indian news publications such as The Hindu. In March 2023 Vanuatu proposed a climate justice resolution which was adopted by the UN General Assembly by consensus. This resolution was co-sponsored by Australia, and was not supported by India.

Some prominent people of Indian origin are citizens of Vanuatu due to the country's citizenship programs, including Atul and Rajesh Gupta.

India and Vanuatu have opposing stances in international environmental matters other than climate change, including on the topic of deep-sea mining. Vanuatu has advocated for a pause on deep-sea mining until regulations are in place, whereas India has participated in deep-sea exploration contracts.

== Multilateral cooperation ==
India and Pacific Island countries cooperate in several multilateral forums, including the United Nations, the Pacific Islands Forum, and international initiatives focusing on sustainable development and climate action. India has supported the priorities of Pacific Small Island Developing States through South–South cooperation and has emphasized collaboration on disaster resilience, renewable energy, and sustainable development goals.

== India's foreign relations with Oceanian countries ==
- Australia–India relations
- Fiji–India relations
- India–Kiribati relations
- India–Marshall Islands relations
- India–Federated States of Micronesia relations
- India–Nauru relations
- India–New Zealand relations
- India–Palau relations
- India–Papua New Guinea relations
- India–Samoa relations
- India–Solomon Islands relations
- India–Tonga relations
- India–Tuvalu relations
- India–Vanuatu relations
