= Foreign relations of Kiribati =

Kiribati is a full member of the Commonwealth, the IMF and the World Bank, and became a full member of the United Nations in 1999. Kiribati hosted the Thirty-First Pacific Islands Forum in October 2000. Kiribati has Least Developed Country Status and its interests rarely extend beyond the region. Through accession to the Lomé Convention, then Cotonou Agreement, Kiribati is also a member of the African Caribbean and Pacific Group. Kiribati maintains good relations with most countries and has particularly close ties to Pacific neighbours Japan, Australia, South Korea and New Zealand. Kiribati briefly suspended its relations with France in 1995 over that country's decision to renew nuclear testing in the South Pacific.

Kiribati established diplomatic relations with Taiwan in November 2003, but cut off all relations in September 2019 when Kiribati switched diplomatic recognition to Beijing. Taiwan's foreign minister stated that Kiribati had "unrealistic" expectations from China and ordered the embassy to evacuate.

== Regional relations ==
Kiribati maintains strong regional ties in the Pacific. Until recently it was a full member of the Pacific Islands Forum, the South Pacific Applied Geoscience Commission, the South Pacific Tourism Organisation, the Pacific Regional Environment Programme and the Secretariat of the Pacific Community. Kiribati is one of the eight signatories of the Nauru Agreement Concerning Cooperation in the Management of Fisheries of Common Interest which collectively controls 25–30% of the world's tuna supply and approximately 60% of the western and central Pacific tuna supply . In 1985, Kiribati was one of the nine initial endorsers of the Treaty of Rarotonga creating the South Pacific Nuclear Free Zone Treaty.

=== Extra-regional relations ===
Kiribati was admitted to the Commonwealth of Nations in 1979 upon its independence, and to the United Nations in 1999.

Additionally outside the region, Kiribati is a member or participant of the ACP (Lomé Convention), the Asian Development Bank, the Economic and Social Commission for Asia and the Pacific (ESCAP), the Food and Agriculture Organization (FAO), the International Bank for Reconstruction and Development, the International Civil Aviation Organization, the International Red Cross and Red Crescent Movement, the International Development Association, the International Finance Corporation, the IMF, International Maritime Organization, International Olympic Committee, International Telecommunication Union (ITU), Universal Postal Union and the World Meteorological Organization. Finally, while Kiribati is not a member of the World Trade Organization, it does retain observer status.

== Diplomatic relations ==
List of countries which Kiribati maintains diplomatic relations with:

#	Country	Date
1	Australia	12 July 1979
2	Canada	12 July 1979
3	Fiji	12 July 1979
4	Solomon Islands	12 July 1979
5	United Kingdom	12 July 1979
6	Japan	21 March 1980
7	New Zealand	29 April 1980
8	South Korea	2 May 1980
9	Netherlands	6 June 1980
10	China	25 June 1980
11	Germany	1 July 1980
12	Vanuatu	30 July 1980
13	United States	12 August 1980
14	Chile	20 January 1981
15	Malaysia	15 March 1982
16	France	3 December 1982
17	Peru	29 October 1983
18	Portugal	15 November 1983
19	Tuvalu	March 1984
20	Israel	21 May 1984
21	Greece	1984
22	India	7 August 1985
23	Marshall Islands	4 June 1988
24	Federated States of Micronesia	9 December 1988
25	Maldives	20 March 1989
26	Singapore	7 September 1989
27	Russia	5 September 1990
—	Holy See	10 April 1995
28	Palau	12 July 1995
29	Italy	7 December 1995
30	South Africa	30 August 1999
31	Philippines	25 March 2000
32	Ireland	September 2000
33	Morocco	21 March 2001
34	Cuba	2 September 2002
35	Switzerland	1 June 2004
36	Austria	2004
37	Thailand	29 June 2005
38	Iceland	15 September 2005
39	Mexico	13 October 2005
40	Argentina	21 September 2006
41	Czech Republic	27 June 2007
42	Turkey	20 June 2008
43	Brazil	21 September 2010
44	Egypt	25 September 2010
45	Finland	25 March 2011
46	Spain	24 September 2011
47	Gambia	27 September 2012
48	Georgia	28 September 2012
49	Sweden	28 September 2012
50	Indonesia	8 May 2013
—	Cook Islands	3 September 2013
51	Lithuania	15 January 2014
52	Mongolia	15 January 2014
53	Montenegro	17 January 2014
54	Kazakhstan	18 February 2014
55	Kuwait	4 March 2014
56	Monaco	20 June 2014
57	Estonia	4 September 2014
58	Vietnam	15 September 2014
59	Poland	2 March 2015
60	Latvia	10 April 2015
61	Brunei	26 January 2016
62	Qatar	28 March 2016
63	Hungary	17 June 2016
64	Croatia	26 August 2016
65	Seychelles	27 February 2017
66	Jordan	8 August 2017
67	Dominica	22 January 2018
68	Romania	9 July 2018
69	Bahrain	25 September 2018
70	Saint Lucia	25 September 2018
71	Armenia	26 September 2018
72	Tajikistan	5 April 2019
73	Norway	17 August 2019
74	Kyrgyzstan	26 September 2019
75	Nicaragua	17 May 2021
76	Andorra	27 May 2021
77	Pakistan	3 June 2021
78	Slovenia	8 June 2021
79	Paraguay	20 October 2021
80	San Marino	20 October 2021
81	Algeria	29 October 2021
82	Jamaica	26 April 2022
83	Malta	21 September 2022
84	Saudi Arabia	18 December 2023
85	Panama	30 January 2024
86	Oman	2 July 2024
87	Bulgaria	17 July 2024
88	Nepal	17 July 2024
89	Dominican Republic	18 July 2024
90	Moldova	11 September 2024
91	Guatemala	4 October 2024
92	Bangladesh	Unknown
93	Belgium	Unknown
94	Nauru	Unknown
95	Papua New Guinea	Unknown
96	Samoa	Unknown
97	Tonga	Unknown

== Bilateral relations ==
Country	Formal Relations Began	Notes
Australia	12 July 1979	Australia has a high commission in Tarawa.; Kiribati has an honorary consulate in Burradoo, New South Wales.
China	25 June 1980, broke off 29 November 2003. Restored 27 September 2019.	Main article: China–Kiribati relations Kiribati President Taneti Mamau and Republic of China President Tsai Ing-wen in May 2016. Kiribati firstly established diplomatic relations with the People's Republic of China (PRC) in 1980. At that time, Kiribati had been the home to a satellite tracking base for PRC space program from 1997 until 2003. On 7 November 2003, Kiribati established diplomatic relations with the Republic of China (ROC). Although it did not sever ties with the PRC, expressing the intention to continue relations, Beijing suspended ties on 29 November after failed attempts to lobby President Anote Tong to change his mind. On 9 January 2004, the ROC opened its embassy in Kiribati. On 31 May 2013, Kiribati opened its embassy in Taipei. This was the first ever Kiribati embassy outside of Oceania. Teekoa Iuta became Kiribati's first ambassador to the country. On 20 September 2019, Kiribati switched diplomatic relations from Taiwan to China, effectively cutting all relations to Taiwan. Taiwanese Foreign Minister Joseph Wu said Beijing had used "dollar diplomacy" to influence the Kiribati government. On 15 July 2023, the Chinese military hospital ship “Peace Ark” made harbor at Tarawa, Kiribati, the first Chinese military vessel to visit Kiribati. The seven-day visit was to include humanitarian and medical assistance, part of China's effort to build relationships in the region, and was to be followed by stops in Tonga, Vanuatu, the Solomon Islands and East Timor.
Cuba	2 September 2002	Main article: Cuba–Kiribati relations In the late 2000s, Kiribati began to strengthen its relations with Cuba. Cuba provides medical aid to Kiribati. There are currently sixteen doctors providing specialised medical care in Kiribati, with sixteen more scheduled to join them. Cuban doctors have reportedly provided a dramatic improvement to the field of medical care in Kiribati, reducing the child mortality rate in that country by 80% As of September 2008, over twenty I-Kiribati medical students are studying in Cuba, at Cuba's expense. In September 2008, President Anote Tong attended the first Cuba-Pacific Islands ministerial meeting in Havana. By meeting President Raúl Castro to discuss "mutual friendship and cooperation", he became the first Pacific leader to pay a state visit to Cuba. The two countries signed an agreement on increased cooperation in the field of health.
France	3 December 1982, broke off 6 September 1995, Restored 6 February 1997	Main article: France–Kiribati relations The two countries maintain official diplomatic relations, but no diplomatic presence on each other's territory; the French embassy in Suva is accredited to Kiribati. In 1995, Kiribati briefly suspended its diplomatic relations with France in protest against French nuclear tests at Mururoa in French Polynesia.
Georgia	28 September 2012	Main article: Georgia–Kiribati relations: Georgia is accredited to Kiribati from its embassy in Canberra, Australia.
Germany	1 July 1980	German shipping companies opened a trade school for seamen in 1967. It exists until today. About I-Kiribati 5,000 seaman work for German shipping companies today.: Kiribati has an honorary consul in Hamburg.; Germany has no embassy in Tarawa. The German embassy in Wellington is accredited for Kiribati.
India	6 August 1985	Main article: India–Kiribati relations Diplomatic relations between Kiribati and India were established on 6 August 1985. At the Post Forum Dialogue partner meeting in 2006, India announced that it would provide a grant-in-aid of US$100,000 annually to each of the 14 Pacific Island countries, including Kiribati. This was increased to US$125,000 from 2009.
Mexico	13 October 2005	Kiribati does not have an accreditation to Mexico.; Mexico is accredited to Kiribati from its embassy in Kuala Lumpur, Malaysia.
New Zealand	12 July 1979	Main article: Kiribati–New Zealand relations: Kiribati has an honorary consulate in Wellington.; New Zealand has a high commission in Tarawa.
South Korea	2 May 1980	The Republic of Kiribati and the Republic of Korea have established diplomatic relations on May 2, 1980.: Kiribati and South Korea have nice diplomatic relations and others things.
United Kingdom	12 July 1979	Main article: Kiribati–United Kingdom relations Kiribati established diplomatic relations with the United Kingdom on 12 July 1979: Kiribati does not maintain a high commission in the United Kingdom.; The United Kingdom is not accredited to Kiribati through a high commission; the UK develops relations through its high commission in Suva, Fiji.; The UK governed Kiribati from 1892 until 1979, when Kiribati achieved full independence. Both countries share common membership of the Commonwealth, the International Criminal Court and the United Nations. Bilaterally the two countries have a Double Taxation Agreement.
United States	12 August 1980	Main article: Kiribati–United States relations Following its independence in 1979, Kiribati signed a treaty of friendship with the United States. The United States Department of State characterizes U.S.–Kiribati relations as "excellent", as of 2009. Diplomatic relations are conducted by the I-Kiribati Ambassador to the United States. Although the U.S. does not maintain a diplomatic office or consulate in Kiribati, staff from the American embassy in Suva, Fiji make frequent visits to Kiribati. The U.S. provides economic development assistance through multilateral institutions. From 1967 to 2008, the United States Peace Corps operated in Kiribati.

== Aid and development ==
Kiribati receives development aid from the European Union, Australia, New Zealand, Japan, Canada, USA, the Asian Development Bank, UN agencies and (until 2019) Taiwan. In recent years it has accounted for 20–25% of Kiribati's GDP. Recent projects and notable inputs by the EU have included telecommunications (improvement of telephone exchanges and provision of radio and navigation equipment), the development of seaweed as an export crop, solar energy systems for the outer islands, the upgrading of the Control Tower and fire fighting services at Tarawa's Bonriki International Airport, outer island social development, health services and extensive support for the Kiribati Vocational Training Programme. Additionally, Cuba provides doctors, as well as scholarships for I-Kiribati medical students.

== See also ==
- Ministry of Foreign Affairs and Immigration
- List of diplomatic missions in Kiribati
- List of diplomatic missions of Kiribati
