= India–Solomon Islands relations =

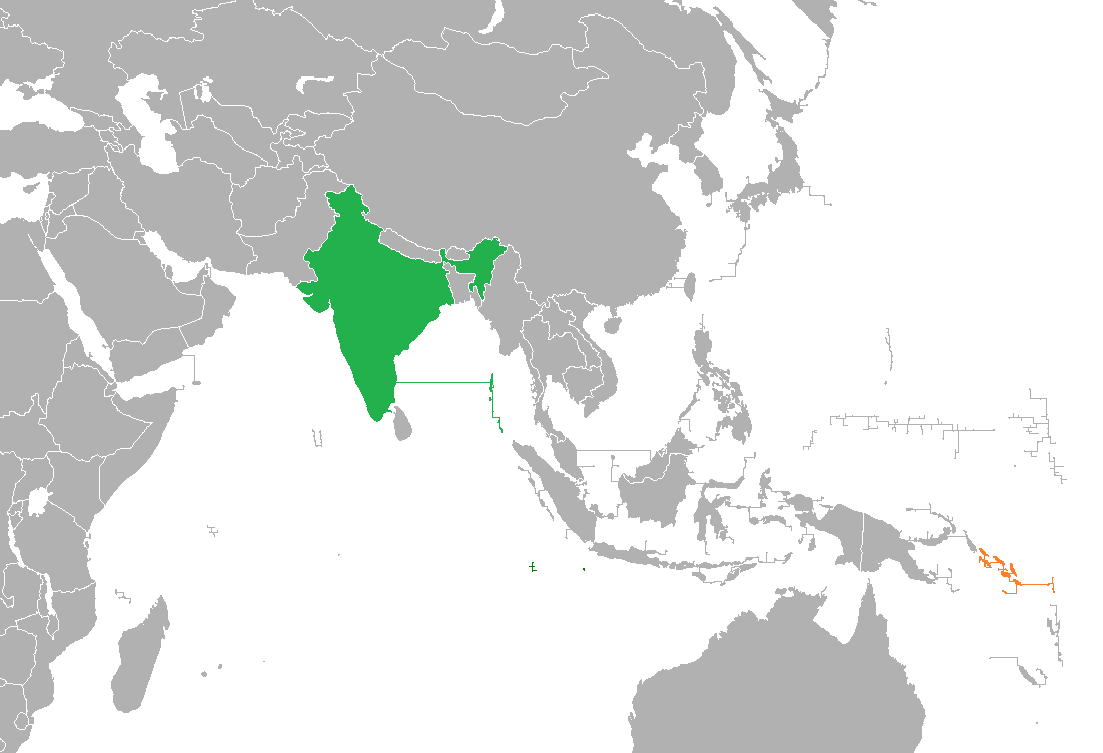

- India: Solomon Islands

India–Solomon Islands relations are the international relations between India and Solomon Islands. Neither country has a resident ambassador. The High Commission of India in Port Moresby, Papua New Guinea is concurrently accredited to Solomon Islands.

== History ==
Diplomatic relations between India and Solomon Islands were established in May 1987. Solomon Islands is a member of the Pacific Islands Forum, of which India is an official dialogue partner. Bilateral relations received a boost following the initiation of the Forum for India–Pacific Islands Cooperation (FIPIC) by the Narendra Modi government in 2014. India announced that it would provide a grant-in-aid of US$100,000 annually to each of the 14 Pacific Island countries, including Solomon Islands, at the Post Forum Dialogue partner meeting in 2006. The amount was increased to US$125,000 annually from 2009. At the first FIPIC Summit on 19 November 2014, Prime Minister Modi announced numerous steps that India would take to improve relations with Pacific Island countries, including Solomon Islands, such as easing visa policies, increase in grant-in-aid to Pacific Island Countries to $200,000 each annually, and several measures to boost bilateral trade and aid in the development of the Pacific Island countries.

== High level visits ==
The Foreign Minister for Solomon Islands, Laurie H. Chan, visited New Delhi between 17 and 20 January 2005 and held bilateral talks with the Foreign Minister, Human Resource Development Minister, the Minister of State for Information Technology, and the Minister of State for Commerce & Industry. Minister of Foreign Affairs and External Trade Peter Shanel Agovaka visited New Delhi in February 2011 to participate in the ministerial meeting on "Harnessing the Positive Contribution of South-South Cooperation for Development of Least Developed Countries (LDCs)". Deputy Prime Minister Douglas Este led a Solomon Islands delegation to attend the 2nd FIPIC Summit held in Jaipur on 21 August 2015. Solomon Islands Prime Minister Manasseh Sogavare attended a function to mark India's Republic Day on 26 January 2017. In his address to the gathering, Sogavare praised the 30-year bilateral relationship between the two countries.

== Trade ==
Bilateral trade between India and Solomon Islands totaled US$7.36 million in 2013–14. India exported $2.06 million worth of goods to Solomon Island, and imported $5.30 million. At the 2nd FIPIC Summit, Prime Minister Modi announced that a FIPIC Trade Office would be opened at the FICCI premises in New Delhi. The trade office, named the FIPIC Business Accelerator, was officially opened on 7 September 2015. The Confederation of Indian Industries (CII) has also established a dedicated department at its headquarters in New Delhi focusing on boosting trade with Pacific Island Countries. Indian firms Asian Paints and Berger Paints operate manufacturing plants in Solomon Islands through their subsidiary, Asian Paints (SI) Ltd.

== Foreign aid ==
In April 2007, India donated US$100,000 towards disaster relief and rehabilitation of tsunami victims in Solomon Islands in April 2007. India also donated $50,000 towards disaster relief after floods in Solomon Islands in March 2014. Solomon Islands citizedns are eligible for scholarships under the Indian Technical and Economic Cooperation Programme.

== Indians in Solomon Islands ==
As of July 2015, around 20 Indian citizens reside in Solomon Islands. The community is engaged in the hospitality sector, missionary work, United Nations organizations and trade. The Association of Indian Origin People is an organization based in Honiara that represents Solomon Islanders of Indian descent.
