= Fiji–India relations =

- India: Fiji

Diplomatic mission
- High Commission of India, Suva: High Commission of Fiji, New Delhi

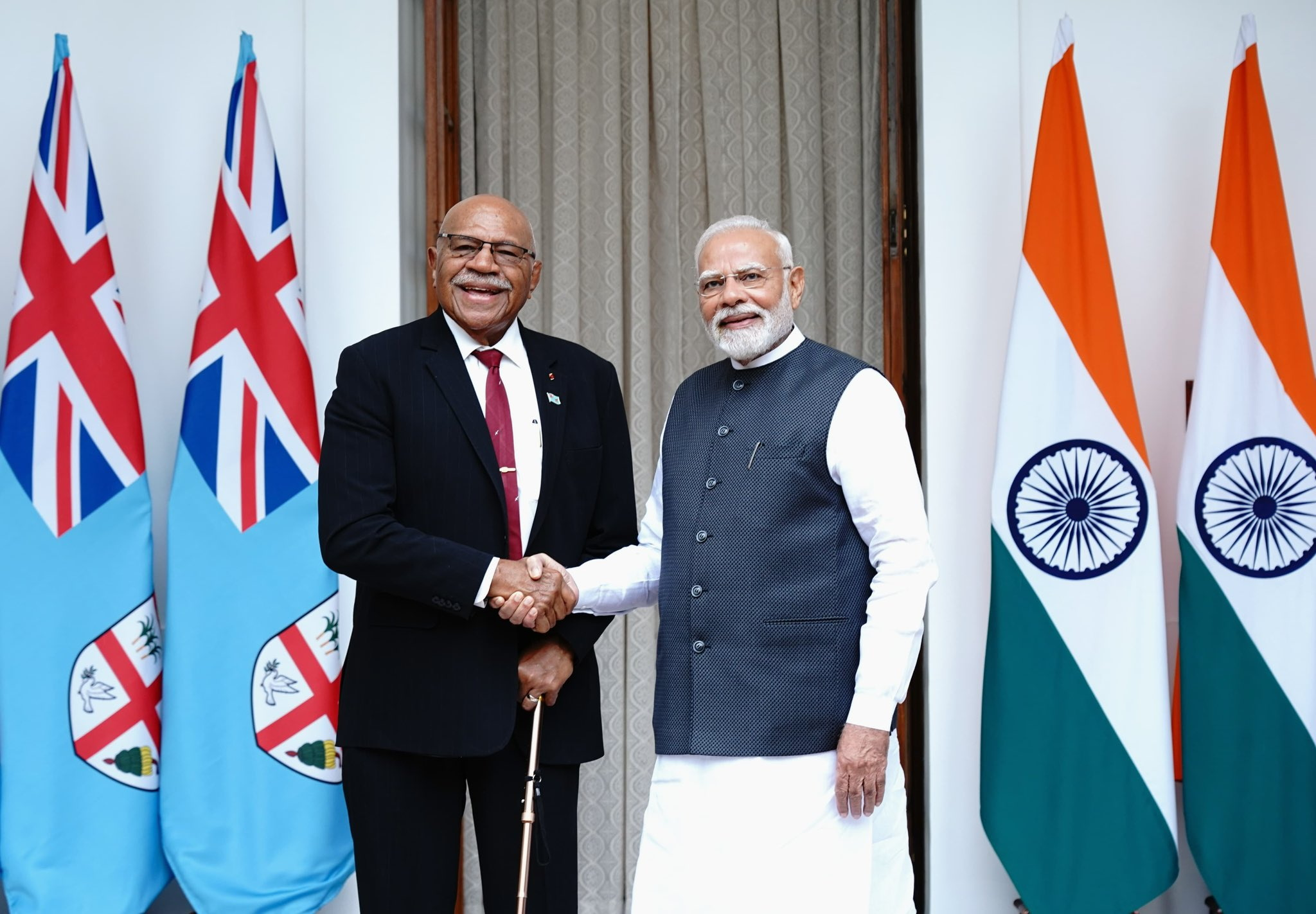
Prime Minister Narendra Modi and Prime Minister of Fiji Sitiveni Rabuka meeting on 25th August 2025.

Fiji–India relations are the foreign relations between Fiji and India. Fiji has a high commission in New Delhi, whilst India has a high commission in Suva.

There are strong cultural links between the countries as 38 percent of Fiji's population is of Indian descent. India has used its influence in international forums such as the Commonwealth of Nations and United Nations on behalf of ethnic Indians in Fiji, lobbying for sanctions against Fiji in the wake of the 1987 coups and the 2000 coup, both of which removed the incumbent governments. In the first case the government was dominated by Indo-Fijians while in the second case it was led by Indo-Fijians. Hindi is also an official language in both countries, through Fiji Hindi in Fiji and Hindi in India

== History ==
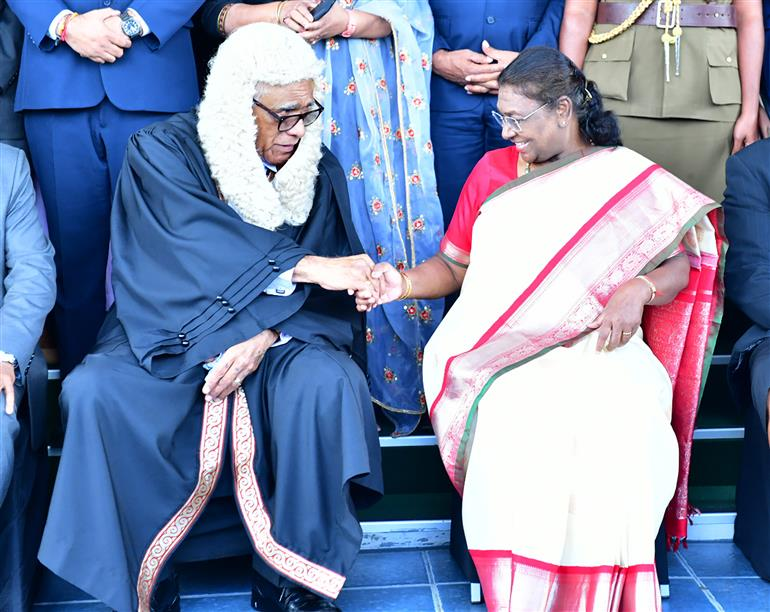
The President of India Droupadi Murmu and Speaker of the Parliament of Fiji Ratu Naiqama Lalabalavu at the Parliament of Fiji, August 06, 2024.

On 15 August 2005, Prime Minister Laisenia Qarase said that the Government of India had loaned F$86 million for the upgrading of Fiji's sugar mills, which would be completed in time for the 2007-2008 crushing season. This was to enable Fiji to diversify its sugar industry into bio-fuels. Indian High Commissioner Ajay Singh said that his country had also offered technical expertise with the restructuring of the industry. He was speaking at the India National Day celebrations in Suva.

Following the military coup of 5 December 2006, the Indian Government policy was to engage with Fiji's interim administration rather than isolate the country.

At the second summit of the Pacific Islands countries, held in Jaipur in August 2015, Prime Minister Narendra Modi announced plans to open a space research and satellite monitoring station in Fiji. The station will enable India the capability to track satellites independently. India previously relied on the United States and Australia to assist it with monitoring its satellites over the Pacific.

== Qarase's state visit to India, 2005 ==
Qarase and his Foreign Minister, Kaliopate Tavola, began a week-long state visit to India on 8 October, to open Fiji's new High Commission in New Delhi. The High Commission had hitherto operated out of a hotel. About 50 local businessmen accompanied the Prime Minister.

On 10 October, Qarase and his Indian counterpart, Manmohan Singh, signed four agreements. The most important is a three-year cooperation agreement in New Delhi. The agreement, most of which covers development cooperation, can be extended by mutual consent. They also signed a health service partnership agreement, while Tavola and India's Tourism Minister Renuka Chowdhury signed a tourism agreement.

Singh urged Fiji to embrace multiculturalism as a permanent part of its identity. Qarase said that Singh had told him he understood the difficulty of forging unity in a multiracial nation because India was in a similar situation. He said that Singh had denied Opposition Leader Mahendra Chaudhry's earlier hint that India would not help Fiji if it passed its controversial Reconciliation, Tolerance, and Unity Bill, a claim made by Chaudhry on his return to Fiji in September.

Speaking in Sydney, Australia, on 16 October, Qarase judged his just-concluded Indian visit a success. He said that one of the highlights for him was his visit to the Banariaman sugar mill in Mysore. He said that Fiji could learn a great deal from the Indian sugar industry.

== Military cooperation ==
India has a satellite tracking and intelligence station in Fiji. It is operated by the Indian Space Research Organisation. In 2017, India and Fiji signed a defence pact for strengthening Fiji's naval capabilities, training and arms production, etc.

== See also ==
- India–Madagascar Relations
- India–Samoa Relations
- India–Tonga Relations
