= Kiribati–United States relations =

- Kiribati: United States

Diplomatic mission
- Kiribati Consulate, Honolulu: United States Embassy, Suva

Envoy
- Ambassador Teburoro Tito: Ambassador; Marie C. Damour

Kiribati and the United States have diplomatic relations. Geographically, Kiribati is the closest neighboring country to the state of Hawaii.

== History ==
Gilbert and Ellice Islands–United States relations
- Gilbert and Ellice Islands: United States

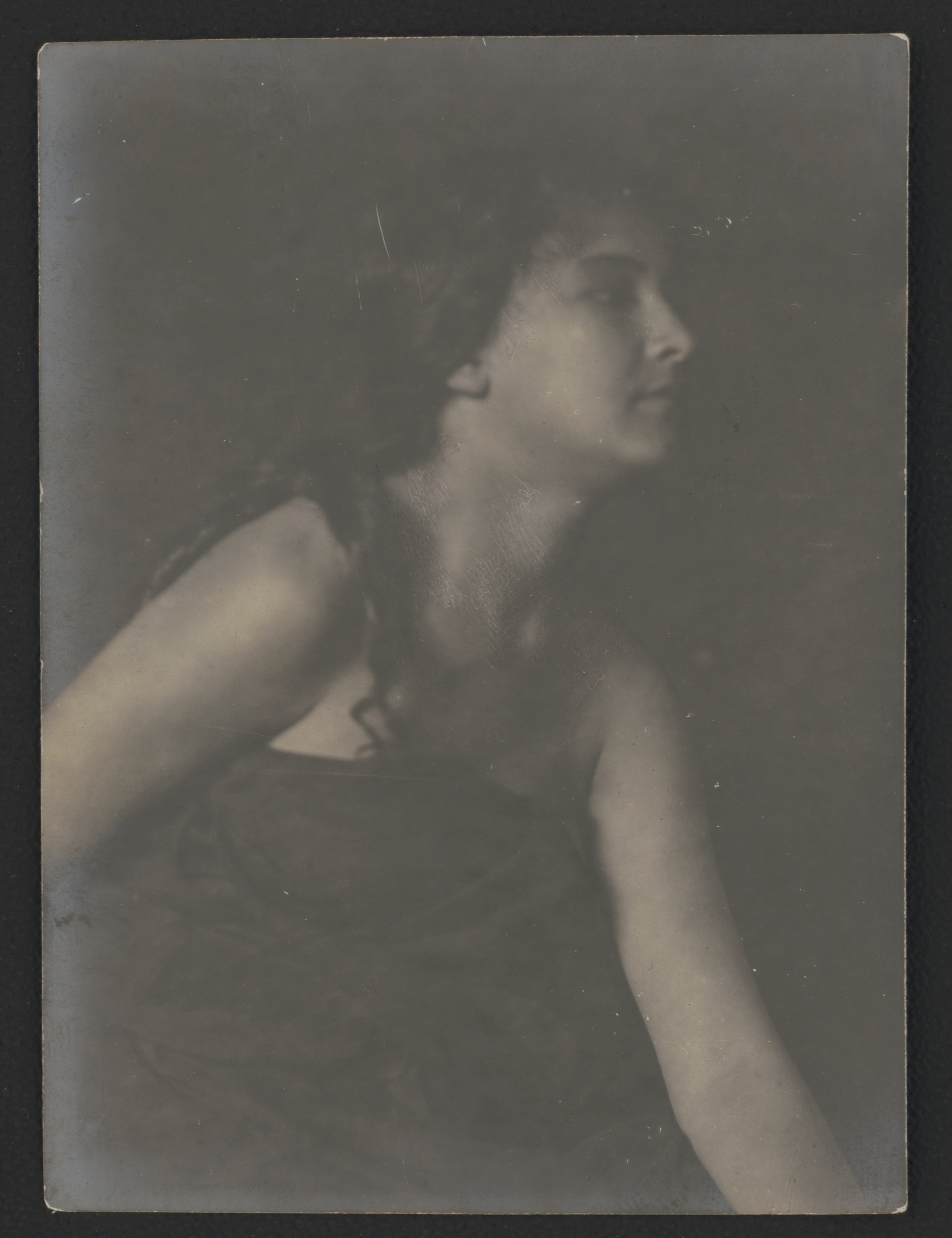
Gilbertese-Hawaiian girl, 1909

Gilbert Islands–United States relations

- Gilbert Islands: United States

=== After independence ===
Following its independence in 1979, Kiribati signed a treaty of friendship with the United States. The United States Department of State characterizes U.S.–Kiribati relations as "excellent", as of 2009. Diplomatic relations are conducted by the I-Kiribati Ambassador to the United States. The United States has no consular or diplomatic facilities in the country. Officers of the American Embassy in Suva, Fiji, are concurrently accredited to Kiribati and make periodic visits. The U.S. Peace Corps, an independent United States federal agency, had maintained a program in Kiribati since 1967. However, the Corps announced plans to pull out of Kiribati in November 2008 after 35 years of working in the country. Michael Koffman, the Peace Corps Country Director for Kiribati, cited the frequently cancelled and erratic air service in the country as the main reason the Peace Corps was leaving Kiribati.

In 2023, the United States announced plans to open up an embassy in Kiribati, as part of a larger regional push to strengthen ties in the Pacific.

== Embassy ==
=== United States ===
Principal U.S. Embassy Officials include:

- US Ambassador – Marie C. Damour (since 2022).

The U.S. Embassy responsible for Kiribati is located in Suva, Republic of the Fiji Islands.

=== Kiribati ===
Principal Kiribati Officials include:

- Permanent Representative of Kiribati to the United Nations – Teburoro Tito

The Kiribati Permanent Mission to the UN serves as the Embassy in the United States.

== See also ==
- Foreign relations of the United States
- Foreign relations of Kiribati
- List of ambassadors of Kiribati to the United States
