= India–Marshall Islands relations =

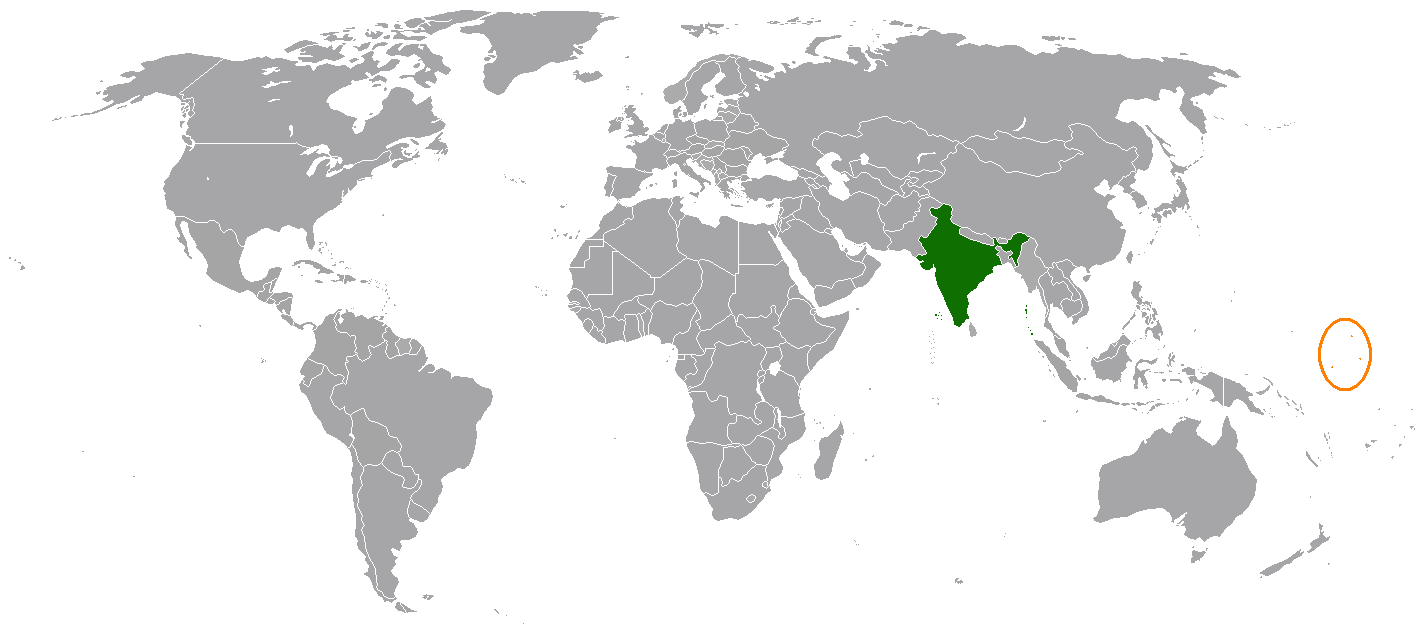

- India: Marshall Islands

India–Marshall Islands relations are the bilateral relations between India and the Marshall Islands. The respective embassies of the two countries in Tokyo, Japan are concurrently accredited to each other. Marshall Islands maintains an Honorary Consulate in New Delhi.

== History ==
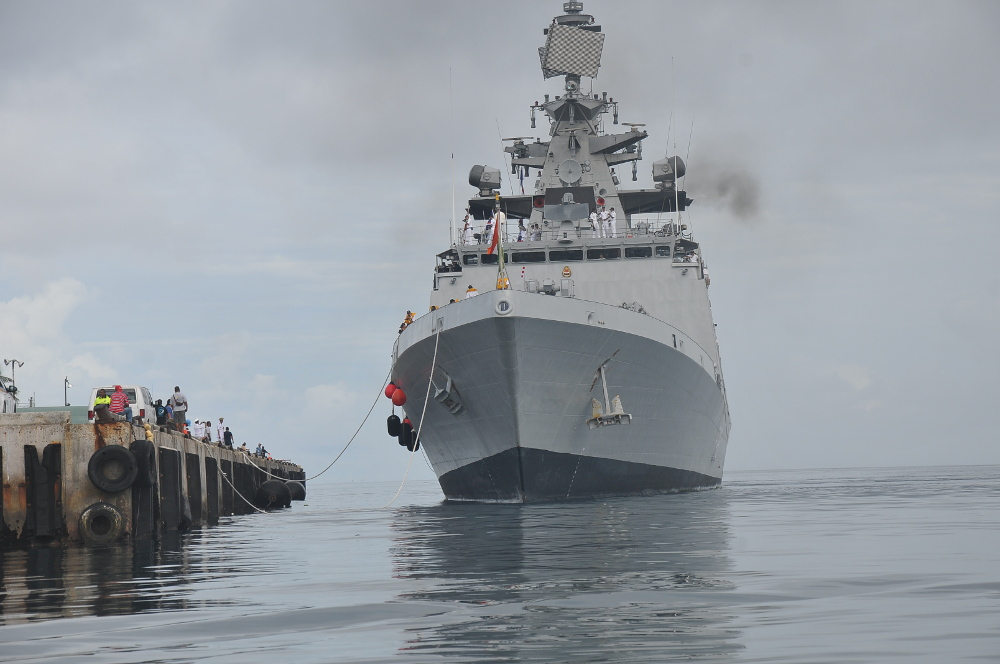
The INS Satpura arrives in Majuro (August 2016)

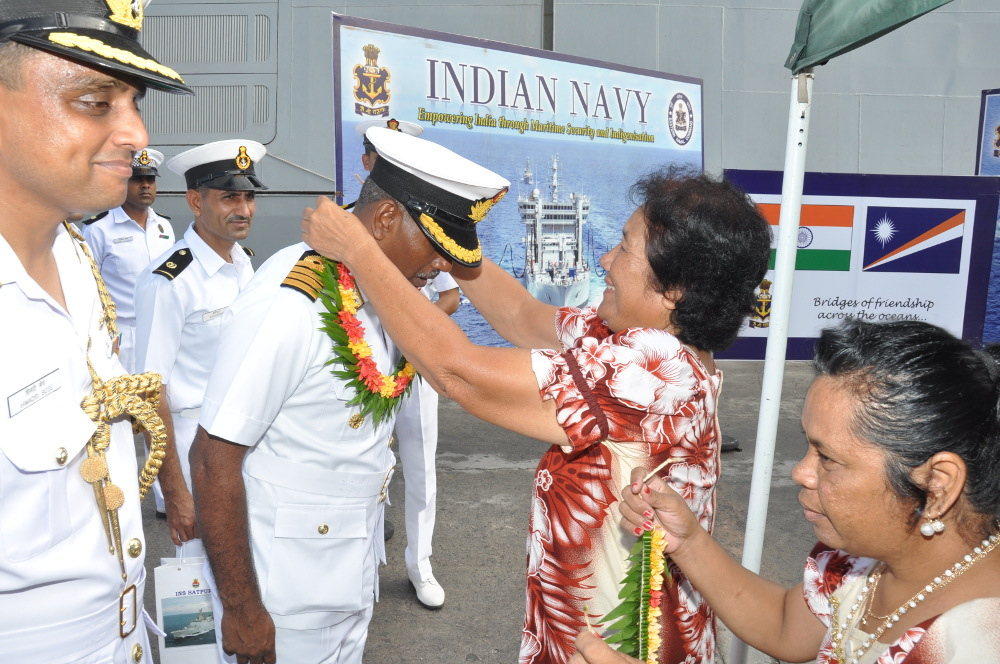
The Indian Navy personnel of the INS Satpura visits Majuro (August 2016)

Diplomatic relations between India and the Marshall Islands were established in April 1995. India was among the first countries to establish diplomatic ties with the Marshall Islands. The country is a member of the Pacific Islands Forum, of which India is an official dialogue partner. Bilateral relations received a boost following the initiation of the Forum for India–Pacific Islands Cooperation (FIPIC) by the Narendra Modi government in 2014. A Marshallese delegation including Foreign Minister Tony deBrum attended the first India-Forum for Pacific Island Countries (FIPIC) Summit hosted in Suva, Fiji on 19 November 2014 by Prime Minister Modi.

Marshall Islands voted for India's candidature for a Non-Permanent Seat on the UN Security Council for the year 2011–12, and also supported the G-4's resolution of reforming the UN Security Council.

== High level visits ==
Speaker of the Parliament Kessai Note and a parliamentary delegation visited India in the late 1990s. Then Ambassador of India to the Marshall Islands (resident in Manila) Amit Dasgupta led an Indian delegation to attend the Post Forum Dialogue Meetings Forum held in Majuro in September 2013. Dasgupta also held talks with the Marshallese Foreign Minister and Speaker of Parliament. Minister of Internal Affairs Wilbur Heine visited New Delhi in October 2013 to attend the South-South Cooperation for Child Rights in Asia and the Pacific, organised by the Indian Ministry of Women and Child Development. Minister for Public Works Hiroshi Yamamura and Tobolar Copra Processing Authority of RMI CEO Jemi Nashion visited Kochi in February 2015 to participate in the 51st Asia Pacific Coconut Community Session/Ministerial Meeting.

President Christopher Loeak led a Marshallese delegation to attend the 2nd FIPIC Summit held in Jaipur on 21 August 2015. At the summit, Loeak spoke about the upcoming UN Climate Change Conference and praised India's role in combating climate change. Loeak said, "No country is more central to success in Paris than India. With its booming economy, its technological ingenuity and its big appetite for clean energy, the world’s biggest democracy is well poised for strong and visible leadership on climate change. Thankfully, there are few clean energy crusaders like Prime Minister Modi." He also held bilateral discussions with Prime Minister Modi on the sidelines of the summit. Loeak was the first Marshallese head of state to visit India. Speaker Kessai Note, who had visited India over a decade earlier, would go on to become the first commoner (rather than a traditional chief) to be elected to the Presidency after the visit.

== Military relations ==
INS Satpura visited Majuro on 13–15 August 2016 after participating in RIMPAC-16, and was the first Indian Navy ship to visit the country. The crew of the ship met with Marshallese police forces, and senior Government and military authorities, and also held sporting and cultural interactions.

== Nuclear weapons case ==
On 24 April 2014, Marshall Islands filed cases against India, and eight other nations who have declared or are believed to possess nuclear weapons, at the International Court of Justice (ICJ) alleging that the countries had not fulfilled "their obligations with respect to the cessation of the nuclear arms race at an early date and to nuclear disarmament". The Government of the Marshall Islands alleged that the countries were in breach of the Nuclear Non-Proliferation Treaty (NPT). However, India has not signed the NPT. The Marshall Islands aimed to urge nations to resume negotiations to eradicate their nuclear weapons stockpiles. Six of the nine nations did not respond to the suit and the cases against them did not proceed.

Only India, Pakistan and the United Kingdom accepted the authority of the ICJ, and responded to the suit arguing that the cases against them should be dismissed as the ICJ did not have the jurisdiction over the matter. The 16 judge ICJ bench that heard the case accepted India's argument and delivered its verdict with nine votes in favour and seven against. The case against India was dismissed on 5 October 2016; ICJ presiding judge Ronny Abraham ruled, "The court upholds the objection to jurisdiction raised by India. Therefore the tribunal cannot proceed to the merits of the case."

This was the first case involving in India at the ICJ, since a 1999 case filed by Pakistan alleging that one of its naval aircraft had been shot down by the Indian Air Force. Like the Marshall Islands case, India had successfully argued that the Pakistan case should be dismissed as the ICJ had no jurisdiction over the matter. This was also the first case regarding nuclear weapons heard by the ICJ since it issued an advisory opinion on the subject in 1996.

== Trade ==
Bilateral trade between India and the Marshall Islands is constrained by the large distance between the two countries and the small size of the Marshallese economy. Trade between the two countries totaled US$102.32 million in 2015–16, rising sharply from $130,000 the previous fiscal. India exported $101.91 million worth of goods to the Marshall Islands, and imported $410,000. The main commodity traded between India and the Marshall Islands is mineral oil and its related products. Pharmaceuticals and drugs are also major Indian exports to the country.

At the 2nd FIPIC Summit, Prime Minister Modi announced that a FIPIC Trade Office would be opened at the FICCI premises in New Delhi. The trade office, named the FIPIC Business Accelerator, was officially opened on 7 September 2015. The Confederation of Indian Industries (CII) has also established a dedicated department at its headquarters in New Delhi focusing on boosting trade with Pacific Island Countries.

The two countries signed a tax information exchange agreement (TIEA) on 18 March 2016 in Majuro. The agreement went into effect from 21 May 2019.

== Cultural relations ==
As of December 2016, around 8 families of Indian origin reside in the Marshall Islands. The community is primarily involved in the clothing, automobiles and solar power industries. One Indian works as a doctor at the Majuro Hospital.

There are some Marshallese nationals enrolled as students at various institutions in India such as the National Institute of Solar Energy in Gurgaon, APTECH, near Delhi, and Centre for Excellence in Telecom Technology & Management in Mumbai.

== Foreign aid ==
India provided $242,500 to the Marshall Islands in 2005 for the procurement of solar panels and two way radio sets for the Outer Islands Health Centre, and $100,000 in June 2008 to install solar powered streetlights in Majuro. At the request of the Marshallese Government, India donated two mini vans, and computers and communication equipment worth $163,000 in 2013, and also donated a set of books on contemporary Indian literature to the College of the Marshall Islands library. This was the first collection of books on India in the College's library. Later that year, following a declaration of a state of emergency and drought by the Marshallese President, India donated $100,000 towards disaster relief for a drought affecting the Marshall Islands. In September 2015, India donated a set of books on the functioning of the Indian Parliament to the Parliament of the Marshall Islands.

India announced that it would provide a grant-in-aid of US$100,000 annually to each of the 14 Pacific Island countries, including the Marshall Islands, at the Post Forum Dialogue partner meeting in 2006. The amount was increased to US$125,000 annually from 2009. At the first FIPIC Summit on 19 November 2014, Prime Minister Modi announced numerous steps that India would take to improve relations with Pacific Island countries, including the Marshall Islands, such as easing visa policies, increase in grant-in-aid to Pacific Island Countries to $200,000 each annually, and several measures to boost bilateral trade and aid in the development of the Pacific Island countries.

Grant-in-aid of $100,570 was provided in January 2015 to fund the Marshall Island's first National Export Strategy. India extended a special grant of $150,000 in 2015–16 to help the Marshall Islands host the Annual Pacific Islands Leader’s Summit in Majuro. India provided a grant of $200,000 for an "Atoll Community Coral and Calm Project", and another grant of $100,000 towards disaster relief and recovery on 18 March 2016.

Citizens of the Marshall Islands are eligible for scholarships under the Indian Technical and Economic Cooperation Programme and the Indian Council for Cultural Relations. Marshallese diplomats attended a special training course for diplomats from Pacific Island Countries organized by the Foreign Service Institute and held in Palau in May 2015.
