= India–Tuvalu relations =

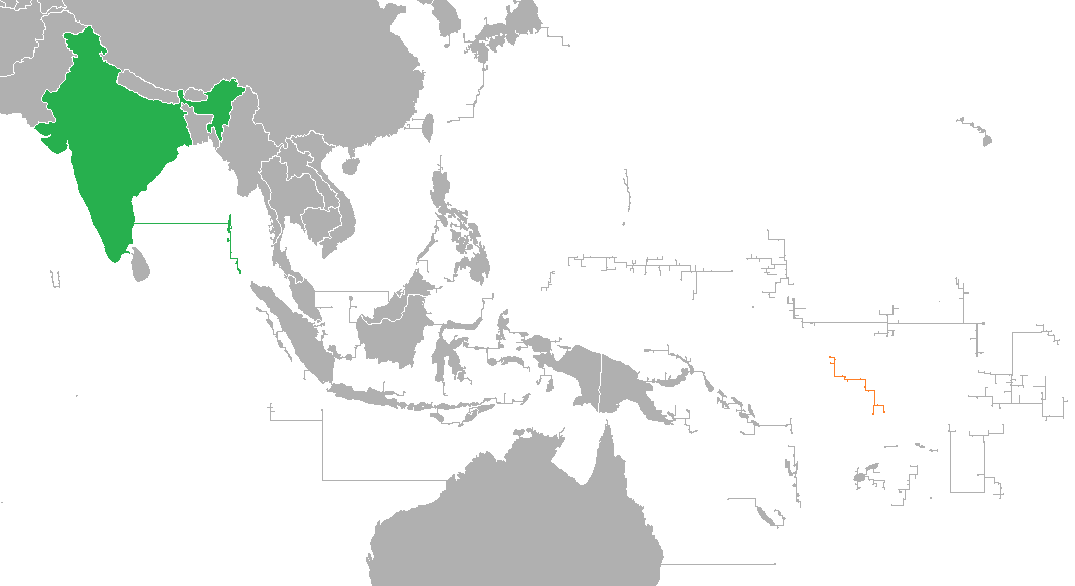

- India: Tuvalu

India–Tuvalu relations are the international relations that exist between India and Tuvalu. The High Commission of India in Suva, Fiji is concurrently accredited to Tuvalu. Tuvalu maintains an Honorary Consulate General in New Delhi.

== History ==
Tuvalu is a member of the Pacific Islands Forum, of which India is an official dialogue partner. Diplomatic ties between the two countries received a boost when the High Commission of India in Suva, Fiji which had been closed in May 1990, was re-opened in March 1999. Bilateral relations intensified after the initiation of the Forum for India–Pacific Islands Cooperation (FIPIC) by the Narendra Modi government in 2014. A Tuvaluan delegation led by Governor-General Sir Iakoba Italeli attended the first FIPIC Summit hosted in Suva, Fiji on 19 November 2014 by Prime Minister Modi.

Tuvalu was one of 34 countries to co-sponsor of the G-4 resolution on the reform of the United Nations in 2005. Tuvalu supported the candidature of Indian diplomat Kamalesh Sharma in the election for Commonwealth Secretary-General held at Kampala, Uganda in November 2007.

Speaker of Parliament Sir Kamuta Latasi visited New Delhi to attend the 20th Conference of Commonwealth Speakers in New Delhi on 4–8 January 2010. Minister of Foreign Affairs Taukelina Finikaso visited India and inaugurated the Honorary Consulate General of Tuvalu in New Delhi on 27 August 2013. Minister of Education, Youth and Sports Fauoa Maani led a Tuvaluan delegation to participate in the Second High Level Meeting (HLM) on South-South Cooperation for Child Rights in Asia and the Pacific held at New Delhi in October 2013.

Prime Minister Enele Sosene Sopoaga was a guest of honour at the ITEC Day 2013 event organized by the High Commission of India in Suva on 29 November 2013. Sopoaga led a Tuvaluan delegation to participate in the 2nd India-Forum for Pacific Island Countries (FIPIC) Summit held in Jaipur on 21 August 2015. Governor-General Sir Italeli Iakoba visited India in October 2015 to participate in the 16th International Conference of Chief Justices of the World held in Lucknow. Several other Tuvaluan officials have also visited the country. There have been no high-level visits from India to Tuvalu.

India and Tuvalu were among the first 19 countries to join the International Solar Alliance, proposed by Prime Minister Narendra Modi, on 15 November 2016.

== Trade ==
Bilateral trade between India and Tuvalu totaled US$700,000 in 2015–16, declining from $1.45 million the previous fiscal. India exported $600,000 worth of goods to Tuvalu and imported $100,000 in 2015–16. Exports of ships, boats and floating structures from Tuvalu to India had boosted Indian imports from Tuvalu to $1.42 million. The main commodities exported by India to Tuvalu are tobacco, sugar and confectionery.

At the 2nd FIPIC Summit, Prime Minister Modi announced that a FIPIC Trade Office would be opened at the FICCI premises in New Delhi. The trade office, named the FIPIC Business Accelerator, was officially opened on 7 September 2015. The Confederation of Indian Industries (CII) has also established a dedicated department at its headquarters in New Delhi focusing on boosting trade with Pacific Island Countries.

== Cultural relations ==
There is a small Indian community in Tuvalu, consisting mostly of Indo-Fijians.

== Foreign aid ==
India announced that it would provide a grant-in-aid of US$100,000 annually to each of the 14 Pacific Island countries, including Tuvalu, at the Post Forum Dialogue partner meeting in 2006. The amount was increased to US$125,000 annually from 2009. Tuvalu utilized the grants for several activities such as procuring computers, medicines, and medical equipment for the Princess Margaret Hospital (the only government hospital in the capital city of Funafuti). India donated $100,000 to build facilities for the storage, supply and management of water in the aftermath of a severe drought in Tuvalu in February 2012. India provided Tuvalu with two chain-saws in 2012, and funding to purchase a lawn-mower and a grass cutter in March 2013.

At the first FIPIC Summit on 19 November 2014, Prime Minister Modi announced numerous steps that India would take to improve relations with Pacific Island countries, including Tuvalu, such as easing visa policies, increase in grant-in-aid to Pacific Island Countries to US$200,000 each annually, and several measures to boost bilateral trade and aid in the development of the Pacific Island countries. Funds were provided to procure a new ambulance for the Princess Margaret Hospital in September 2014, and to acquire medical equipment for them in October 2014. India has also provided funds to procure dental equipment at the hospital, and to purchase office equipment for the Lofeagai Community Church.

Citizens of the Tuvalu are eligible for scholarships under the Indian Technical and Economic Cooperation Programme and the Indian Council for Cultural Relations. Tuvaluan diplomats attended a special training course for diplomats from Pacific Island Countries organized by the Foreign Service Institute and held in Nadi, Fiji.
