= France–Kiribati relations =

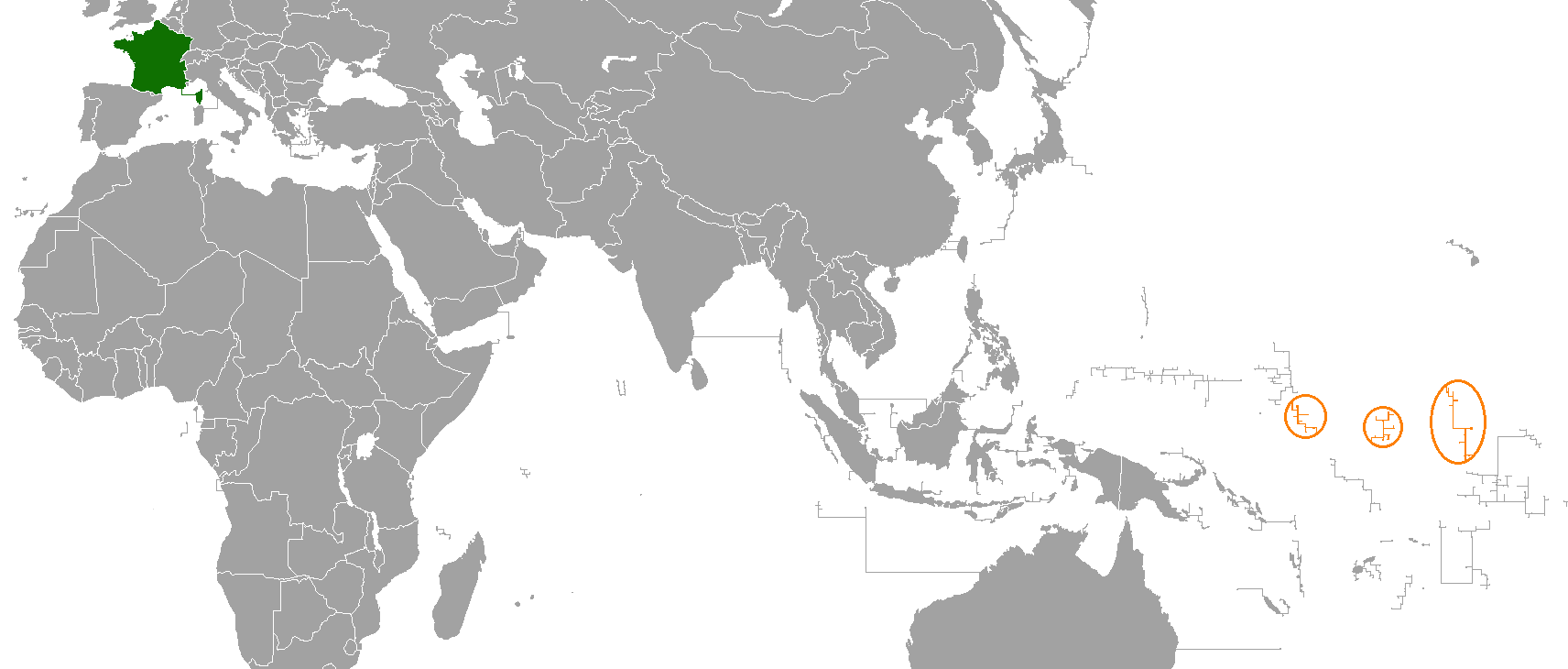

- France: Kiribati

France and Kiribati maintain official diplomatic relations, but neither country has a diplomatic presence in the other's territory; the French embassy in Suva is accredited to Kiribati.

== History ==
In 1995, Kiribati briefly suspended its diplomatic relations with France in protest against French nuclear tests at Mururoa in French Polynesia.

France provides aid to Kiribati in various forms. French aid enabled the opening on nine school classes on Maiana in the early 2000s, and France also recently assisted Kiribati in evaluating its remaining phosphate resources on Banaba.

French exports to Kiribati were worth 24 million Euro in 2002.

Kiribati also allows French vessels to fish in its waters.

I-Kiribati President Anote Tong paid a State visit to Paris in June 2006 to attend a France-Oceania multilateral summit. The summit aimed at "strengthening French-Pacific relations and regional cooperation" in economic, political, environmental and security fields.

== Sources ==
- French Foreign Affairs Ministry

== See also ==
- Foreign relations of France
- Foreign relations of Kiribati
