= India–Tonga relations =

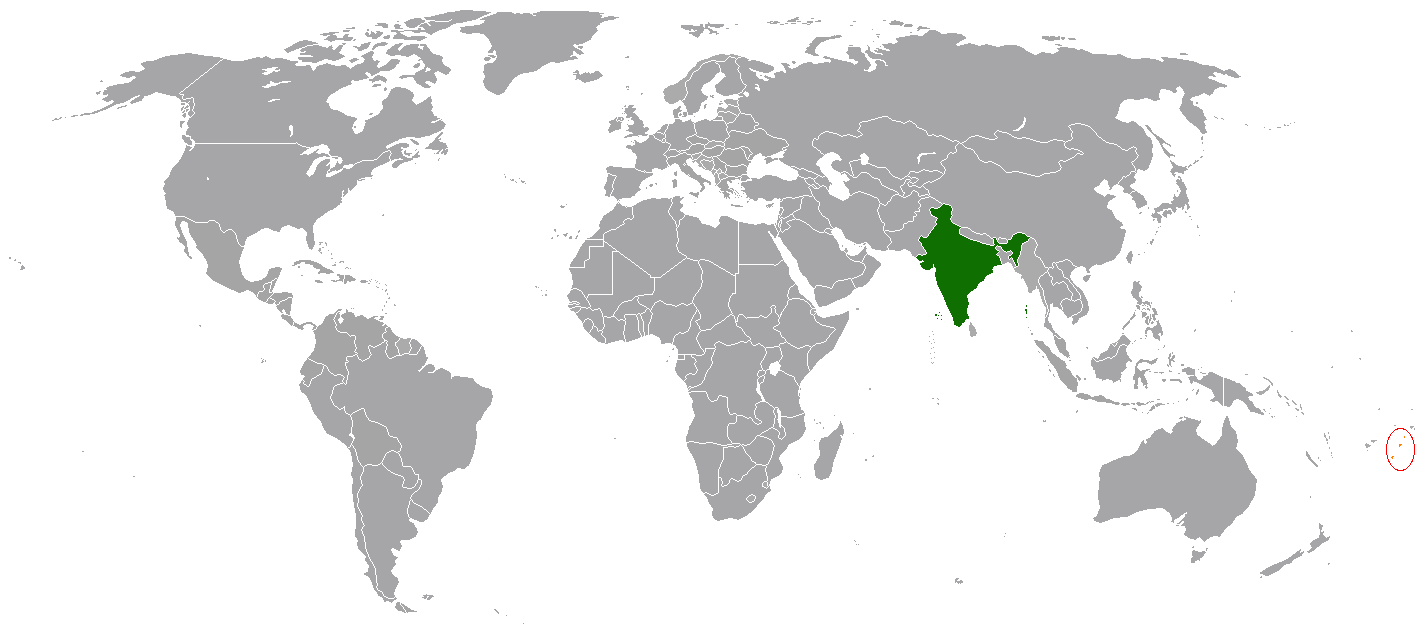

- India: Tonga

India–Tonga relations are the international relations that exist between India and Tonga. The High Commission of India in Suva, Fiji is concurrently accredited to Tonga.

== History ==
Tonga and India agreed to establish diplomatic relations in 1970.

King Taufa'ahau Tupou IV and the Queen made state visits to India in 1971 and 1976. Indian High Commissioner to Fiji T.P. Sreenivasan spoke with King Topou IV after the credentials presentation ceremony. According to Sreenivasan, Tupou IV was well-informed of world affairs and asked several questions about developments in India and South Asia. Sreenivasan also noted that the King "had very good memories about his visit to India and was full of praise for Air India because the airline gave him two seats for the price of one, whenever he flew with them." Prime Minister Indira Gandhi visited Tonga in 1981.

The Tongan Prime Minister and Foreign Minister visited India in May 2002 and held discussions with the Indian Prime Minister, Foreign Minister and Agriculture Minister. The Indian Foreign Minister's Special Envoy on UN reforms visited Tonga in August 2005. INS Tabar visited the country in July 2006, and held a reception on board which was attended by the Prime Minister, Cabinet Ministers, diplomatic corps, senior officers, local Tongans and members of the Indian community. The CO of INS Tabar and DA in Canberra, Australia also met with the Crown Prince. Minister of State for External Affairs led an Indian delegation to attend the Post Forum Dialogue Partners’ Meeting in Tonga in October 2007.

Shortly after his coronation, King George Tupou V made a private visit to India from 11 to 30 September 2009.

The High Commissioner of India in Suva, Fiji represented India at the funeral of King George Tupou V on 27 March 2012.

Lok Sabha Speaker Meira Kumar, and the Speakers of the Legislative Assemblies of Nagaland (Kiyanilie Peseyie) and Rajasthan (Dependra Singh Shekhawat) visited Tonga in April 2012 to participate in the Commonwealth Parliamentary Assembly Mid-Year Executive Committee Meeting. Kumar inaugurated the Kolomotu’a Solar Project on 19 April.

Tonga is a member of the Pacific Islands Forum, of which India is an official dialogue partner. Bilateral relations received a boost following the initiation of the Forum of India-Pacific Islands Cooperation by the Narendra Modi government in 2014. Prime Minister Lord Tu’ivakano led the Tongan delegation to attend the India-Forum for Pacific Island Countries (FIPIC) Summit, hosted by Indian Prime Minister Narendra Modi in Suva on 19 November 2014. At the summit, Modi announced numerous steps that India would take to improve relations with Pacific Island countries, including Tonga, such as easing visa policies, increase in grant-in-aid to Pacific Island Countries to $200,000 each annually, and several measures to boost bilateral trade and aid in the development of the Pacific Island countries. On 11 November 2014, The Tonga Herald published an article listing five reasons why it believed that Prime Minister Modi should visit Tonga.

The High Commissioner of India in Suva represented India at the coronation of King Topou VI on 4 July 2015. Semisi Fakahau, Minister for Agriculture, Food, Forests & Fisheries, led a Tongan delegation to participate in the 2nd India-Forum for Pacific Island Countries (FIPIC) Summit held in Jaipur on 21 August 2015.

== Trade ==
Bilateral trade between India and Tonga totaled US$1.12 million in 2015–16, growing by 83.05% over the previous fiscal. India did not make any imports from Tonga in 2015–16, and the entire value of trade represents Indian exports to the country. India imported $100,000 worth of plastics and plastic articles from Tonga in the 2014-15 financial year. The main commodities exported by India to Tonga are preparations of cereals, flour, starch or milk, pastry products, plastic and plastic articles, pharmaceuticals, and sugar and confectionery.

Anwar Shaikh, the former principal of the Poona College of Arts, Science and Commerce, founded the Commonwealth Vocational University (CVU) in Makaunga, Tonga. The university was inaugurated on 6 February 2016 by the Tongan Minister of Police Pohiva Tuionetoa and Minister of Health Siosaia Tiukala. Shaikh claims that CVU is the first private university in the country.

== Foreign aid ==
Many Tongans, including members of the royal family, regularly receive training in defence and other courses under the Indian Technical and Economic Cooperation (ITEC) programme. Prince Tu'ipelehake became the first Tongan to attend the Indian Military Academy in July 1972. Many Indian experts have been deputed to Tonga to assist in various areas of the country's development. India announced that it would provide a grant-in-aid of US$100,000 annually to each of the 14 Pacific Island countries, including Tonga, at the Post Forum Dialogue partner meeting in 2006. The amount was increased to US$125,000 annually from 2009. In 2007, India provided $200,000 grant-aid for the construction of an access road from Wharf to Hunga village, and for the upgrade of the jetty in Hunga. The Indian government provided grant-aid of $300,000 for Tsunami Alert System in July 2014, $115,000 for an upgrade to the Office of the Public Service Commission ICT Infrastructure in October 2014, and $72,000 for a spectrum monitoring project in September 2015. India donated 1,200 new, full uniform sets to the Tongan military on 8 December 2008. The Indian High Commissioner in Fiji Vishvas Vidu Sapkal donated $600 to the Tonga Breast Cancer Society on 8 February 2017.

Citizens of Tonga are eligible for scholarships under the ITEC programme. Tongan Defence Service personnel have received defence training in various training institutions in India. Tongan officials attended a TERI Workshop on Sustainable Development conducted for the Pacific Island Countries (PIC) in Suva in March 2007. Tongan diplomats have also attended the short-term Course for Diplomats of PIC organized by the Foreign Service Institute at Nadi, Fiji. Tongan women have attended the solar electrification course at the Barefoot College, Tilonia.
