= India–Kiribati relations =

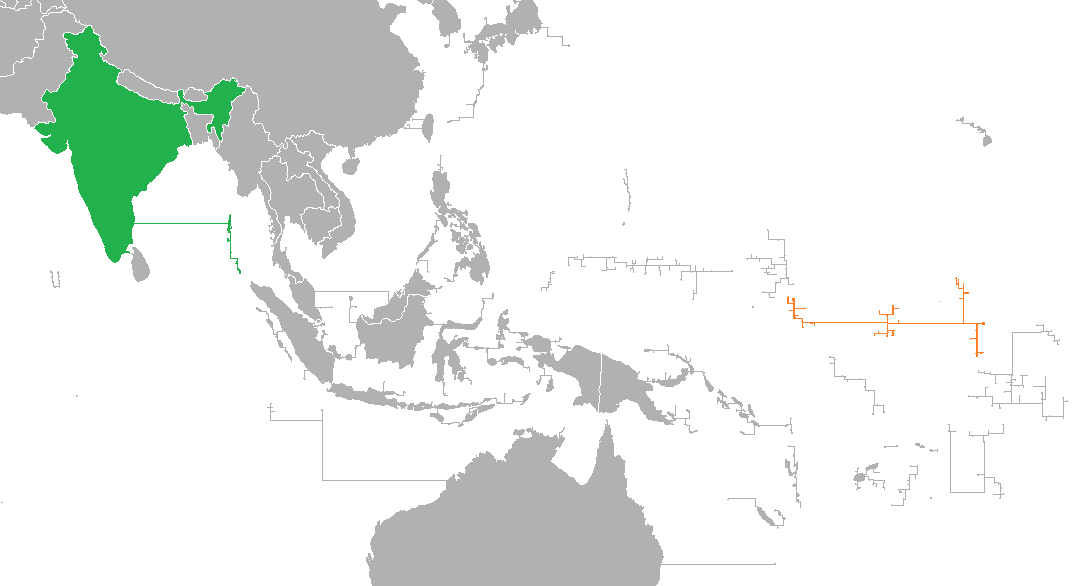

- India: Kiribati

India and Kiribati established diplomatic relations in 1985. The High Commission of India in Suva, Fiji is concurrently accredited to Kiribati. Kiribati maintains an Honorary Consulate in New Delhi.

India and Kiribati are both republics in the Commonwealth of Nations.

== History ==
Diplomatic relations between India and Kiribati were established on 6 August 1985. The High Commission of India in Wellington, New Zealand was concurrently accredited to Kiribati from September 1992 to October 2011, when it was transferred to the High Commission of India in Suva, Fiji.

Kiribati has supported India's candidatures in various international organizations, and was one of 34 countries to co-sponsor the G-4 resolution on the reform of the United Nations in 2005. Minister of Finance and Economic Development Natan Teewe and Deputy Secretary of Ministry of Foreign Affairs and Immigration Terieata Mwemwenikeaki visited New Delhi in February 2011 to attend the Ministerial Meeting on “Harnessing the positive contribution of South-South Cooperation for Development of Least Developed Countries”.

The then President of Kiribati Anote Tong attended the 12th Delhi Sustainable Development Summit (DSDS) held in New Delhi on 1–3 February 2012. He visited India again on 31 January - 2 February 2013 to attend the 13th DSDS. Vice President Teima Onorio visited New Delhi on 23–25 October 2013 to attend the Second High Level Meeting (HLM) on South-South Cooperation for Child Rights in Asia and the Pacific. The Kiribati Government's Advisor on Asia Teekoa Luta led an I-Kiribati delegation to attend the 2nd Summit of Forum for India-Pacific Islands Cooperation (FIPIC) held at Jaipur on 21 August 2015.

The country is a member of the Pacific Islands Forum, of which India is an official dialogue partner. Bilateral relations received a boost following the initiation of the Forum of India-Pacific Islands Cooperation by the Narendra Modi government in 2014. A Marshallese delegation led by Kiribati President Anote Tong attended the first India-Forum for Pacific Island Countries (FIPIC) Summit hosted in Suva, Fiji on 19 November 2014 by Prime Minister Modi. Tong also held bilateral discussions with Prime Minister Modi.

== Trade ==
Bilateral trade between India and Kiribati grew from US$260,000 in 1996–97 to $1.01 million in 2014–15. Trade declined slightly to $940,000 in 2015–16, with India making no imports from Kiribati in that financial year. In 2014–15, India exported $1 million worth of goods to Kiribati, and the sole imports from Kiribati were plastics worth $10,000. The main commodities exported by India to Kiribati are sugar and confectionery, plastics, pharmaceuticals and non-railway vehicle parts.

At the 2nd FIPIC Summit, Prime Minister Modi announced that a FIPIC Trade Office would be opened at the FICCI premises in New Delhi. The trade office, named the FIPIC Business Accelerator, was officially opened on 7 September 2015. The Confederation of Indian Industries (CII) has also established a dedicated department at its headquarters in New Delhi focusing on boosting trade with Pacific Island Countries.

== Foreign aid ==
India donated prosthetic and orthodontic components and materials worth nearly AU$16,000 to the Tungaru Central Hospital Rehabilitation Centre in March 2006 and provided grant-in-aid of AU$137,000 to upgrade the Kiribati Government Printing Press in February 2008. Grants-in-aid of AU$316,000 was provided to procure a 500 KW generator and overhead cables in the Kirimati Island in June 2009, US$26,000 to procure a cherry picker truck and US$135,000 to renovate 3 clinics in December 2012.

India announced that it would provide a grant-in-aid of US$100,000 annually to each of the 14 Pacific Island countries, including Kiribati, at the Post Forum Dialogue partner meeting in 2006. The amount was increased to US$125,000 annually from 2009. At the first FIPIC Summit on 19 November 2014, Prime Minister Modi announced numerous steps that India would take to improve relations with Pacific Island countries, including the Marshall Islands, such as easing visa policies, increase in grant-in-aid to Pacific Island Countries to US$200,000 each annually, and several measures to boost bilateral trade and aid in the development of the Pacific Island countries.

Kiribati was one of the countries selected by the Government of India to implement its "Hole-in-Wall" computer education project under which computers will be installed for use by I-Kiribati children.

Citizens of Kiribati are eligible for scholarships under the Indian Technical and Economic Cooperation Programme and the Indian Council for Cultural Relations. I-Kiribati diplomats attended a special training course for diplomats from Pacific Island Countries organized by the Foreign Service Institute and held in Fiji and Palau in May 2015.
