= Kiribati–United Kingdom relations =

- Kiribati: United Kingdom

Kiribati and the United Kingdom established diplomatic relations on 12 July 1979.

Both countries share common membership of the Commonwealth, the International Criminal Court and the United Nations. Bilaterally the two countries have a Double Taxation Agreement.

== History ==
Britain has long-standing historic links with Kiribati. The first British visitor to Kiribati was reputed to be Commodore John Byron in 1765, the immediate predecessor of James Cook's explorations of the Pacific between 1769 and 1779. With the growth of the British settlement in Australia's New South Wales, whaling became a key element of the regional economy, and up to the 1870s British whalers were regular visitors to the waters surrounding Kiribati. Most of modern Kiribati formed part of the Gilbert and Ellice Islands, administered as a British protectorate from 1892 to 1916 and then as a Crown colony from 1916 to independence in 1979. The Ellice Islands were separated and gained independence as Tuvalu in 1976. The Canton and Enderbury Islands were an Anglo-American condominium until being attached to Kiribati upon independence in 1979.

As of 2015 the UK maintained bilateral programmes with Kiribati sponsored by the Foreign and Commonwealth Office, Department for Environment and Department for International Development and other government departments, run via its network of sovereign posts in the region (Fiji, Solomon Islands, Papua New Guinea, New Zealand and Australia). The UK Government's engagement in Kiribati is largely delivered through the Commonwealth, the European Union and The Asian Development Bank.

== Diplomatic missions ==
- Kiribati does not maintain a high commission in the United Kingdom.
- The United Kingdom is not accredited to Kiribati through a high commission; the UK develops relations through its high commission in Suva, Fiji.

== See also ==
- Operation Grapple
- Foreign relations of Kiribati
- Foreign relations of the United Kingdom
