= Cuba–Kiribati relations =

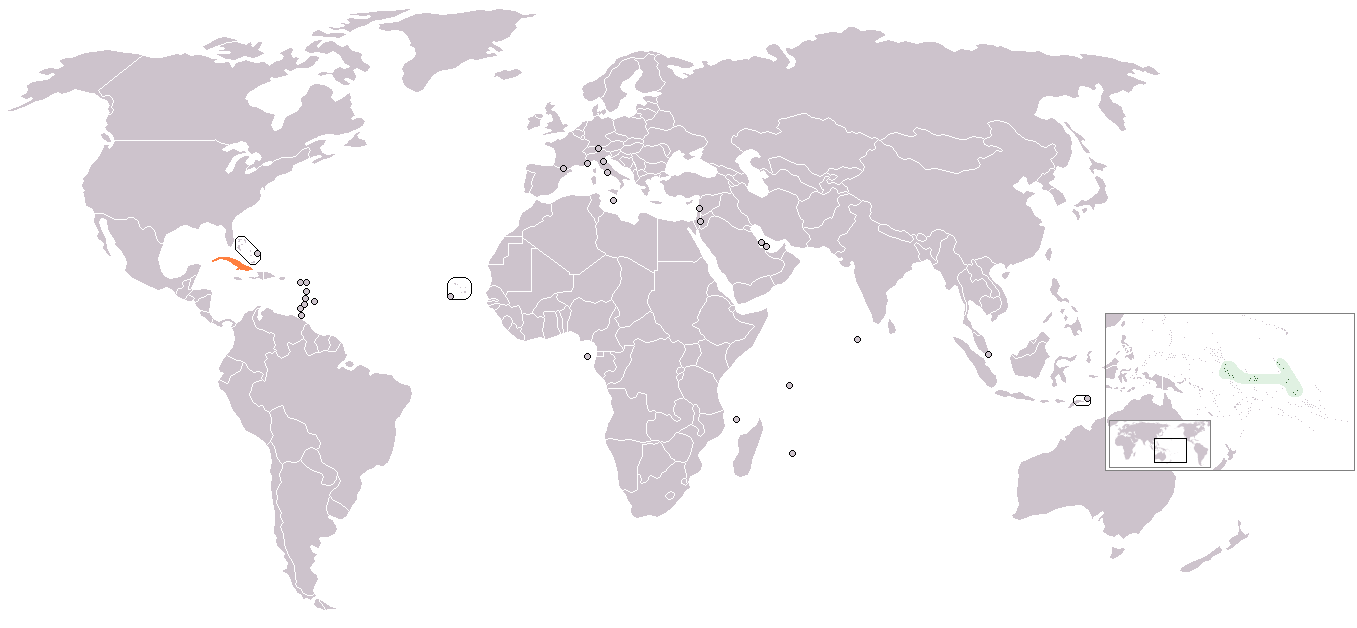

- Kiribati: Cuba

Diplomatic relations between Kiribati and Cuba developed in the 2000s (decade). Like other countries in Oceania, Kiribati is a beneficiary of Cuban medical aid; bilateral relations between Tarawa and Havana must be viewed within the scope of Cuba's regional policy in Oceania.

== Cuban assistance ==
In 2007, there were sixteen doctors providing specialised medical care in Kiribati, with sixteen more scheduled to join them. Cubans have also offered training to I-Kiribati doctors (I-Kiribati are the native people of Kiribati). Cuban doctors have reportedly provided a dramatic improvement to the field of medical care in Kiribati, reducing the child mortality rate in the country by 80%.

As of September 2008, twenty I-Kiribati were studying medicine in Cuba, their expenses paid for by Cuba, with more expected to join them as Cuba increased the number of scholarships provided to Pacific Islander medical students. In December 2010, it was reported that thirty-three I-Kiribati had studied or were studying in Cuba, of which thirty-one were studying medicine.

== State visits ==
In September 2008, I-Kiribati President Anote Tong met Cuban President Raúl Castro in Havana to discuss "mutual friendship and cooperation", thus becoming the first Pacific leader to pay a state visit to Cuba. Tong was in Havana to attend a multilateral Cuba-Pacific summit, where attendees discussed "strengthening co-operation in health, sports and education", and where Cuba pledged assistance to Pacific Island countries in facing the effects of climate change.

In December 2010, President Tong carried out his second State visit to Cuba, to hold official talks with President Castro. Tong was accompanied by other members of Kiribati's government, with an aim to expand bilateral relations beyond the field of medical aid. An agreement on "sports cooperation", in particular, was prepared.

== See also ==
- Foreign relations of Cuba
- Foreign relations of Kiribati
