= Kiribati–New Zealand relations =

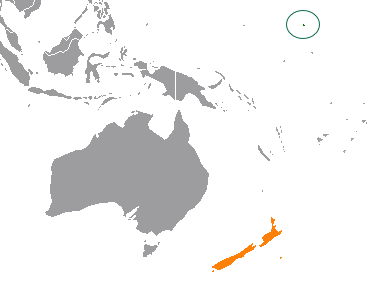

- Kiribati: New Zealand

Kiribati–New Zealand relations are the bilateral relations between Kiribati and New Zealand. Both countries are members of the Commonwealth of Nations and Pacific Islands Forum.

== History ==
During the 20th century, New Zealand along with Australia and the United Kingdom jointly owned a mining company which mined the Kiribati coral island of Banaba for phosphate. The mining operations led to the resettlement of the island's population in Fiji and caused extensive environmental damage to the island. By the time that the Solomon Islands had gained its independence from the UK in 1979, only ten percent of Banaba's surface remained.

New Zealand established diplomatic relations with Kiribati on 29 April 1980. New Zealand established a High Commission in Tarawa in 1989.

=== 2025 diplomatic spat ===
On 28 January 2025, Foreign Minister Winston Peters announced that New Zealand would review its bilateral aid programme to Kiribati after Kiribati President Taneti Maamau cancelled three pre-arranged meetings including one scheduled for mid January 2025. The New Zealand Government had wanted to discuss how NZ$102 million worth of aid funding allocated to Kiribati between 2021 and 2024 was being spent. Peter's visit to Kiribati would have been the first visit by a New Zealand government minister in five years. In response, Kiribati Education Minister Alexander Teabo claimed that Maamu was unavailable due to a scheduling conflict caused by a pre-planned Catholic religious event. In response, Peters disputed Teabo's claim that Maamu had a pre-planned commitment, countering that Maamu himself had arranged to meet with him on 21 and 22 January. Prime Minister Christopher Luxon and Defence Minister Judith Collins supported Peters' decision, citing a lack of engagement from Kiribati.

New Zealand Labour Party leader Chris Hipkins, Green Party Member of Parliament Ricardo Menéndez March and Australian National University Development Policy Centre fellow Terence Wood expressed concern that the suspension of New Zealand developmental aid to Kiribati was counter-productive and could lead the island nation to align closer with China, which Kiribati had established diplomatic relations with in 2019. Kiribati Member of Parliament Ruth Cross Kwansing and Auckland University of Technology law senior lecturer Sione Tekiteki criticised Peters and the New Zealand Government for allegedly disrespecting traditional Pacific protocol by not sending a head of government to meet a fellow head of government. The Kiribati government had invited Peters to meet with Vice-President Teuea Toatu but Peters had insisted on meeting President Maamu, who also served as Kiribati's foreign minister. Kwansing and Tekiteki also rejected New Zealand media speculation that Kiribati's growing diplomatic ties with China had led it to snub New Zealand. Similarly, Victoria University of Wellington political scientist Iati Iati questioned the New Zealand Government's decision to announce its Kiribati aid review via the media rather than through diplomatic channels. Iati compared Peter's actions unfavourably to Australian Deputy Prime Minister Richard Marles' decision to accept a meeting with Toatu in January 2025. By contrast, 1News journalist Barbara Dreaver defended the New Zealand Government's response, citing New Zealand and other Pacific governments' frustration with engaging with Maamu over the past two years.

On 3 February 2025, the Kiribati President's Office issued a statement saying that the New Zealand Government had agreed to a state visit on 21 and 22 January despite being advised that President Maamu was attending a "national commitment" in the southern Gilbert Islands during those dates. The Kiribati Government claimed that New Zealand had cancelled its own proposed visit, stating that "alternative dates were to be explored." The Kiribati Government also expressed disappointment that reports of the visit, which it claimed were still "under negotiation," had been leaked to the New Zealand media. The President's Office rejected New Zealand media speculation that the cancellation was a snub, describing such claims as "misleading and unhelpful to diplomatic relations."

On 19 January 2026, Peters and Kiribati Vice-President Teuea Toatu signed a statement in Tarawa renewing New Zealand's aid assistance to Kiribati in the areas of health, labour mobility and security. A Ministry of Foreign Affairs and Trade confirmed it had completed its review of international development cooperation in Kiribati, and that New Zealand would continue its aid assistance to Kiribati.

== Aid and economic relations ==
New Zealand is a major aid donor to Kiribati. New Zealand's aid to Kiribati has focused on climate change mitigation particularly water and sanitation infrastructure, coastal protection, food security, renewable energy, health and economic development. Between 2018 and 2022, New Zealand was the second biggest aid contributor to Kiribati, contributing 16% of foreign aid to the island state. Between 2021 and 2024, New Zealand contributed NZ$102 million worth of health, education, fisheries, economic development, and climate resilience aid. Of this amount, NZ$20 million was allocated ton health programs such as rebuilding Betio Hospital, training doctors, building clinics, non-communicable disease (NCD) strategic planning and more, NZ$10 million was invested in education and $4 million was invested in developing the fisheries sector.

Kiribati's economy is dependent on overseas money including foreign aid, fishing licenses, working remittances schemes and some limited tourism. New Zealand is also a key partner in Kiribati's fisheries industry, which is a mainstay of Kiribati's economy. Both countries have also ratified the PACER Plus agreement, which came into force on 13 December 2020.

== Migration ==
Several Kiribati nationals have migrated to New Zealand under the Pacific Access Category. Kiribati nationals are also eligible for the Recognised Seasonal Employer scheme, which supplies seasonal workers to New Zealand's horticulture sector. Kiribati tertiary students have also entered New Zealand under the Manaaki New Zealand Scholarships Programme.
