= India–Samoa relations =

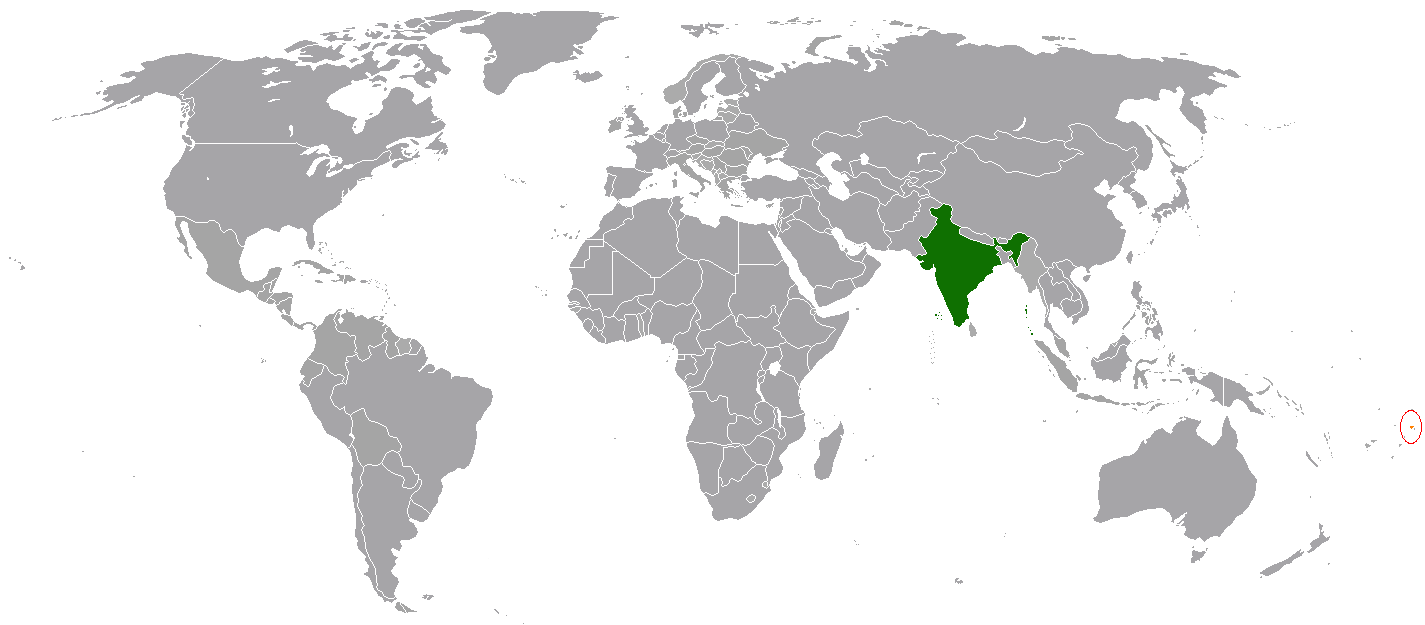

- India: Samoa

India–Samoa relations are the international relations that exist between India and Samoa. The High Commission of India in Wellington, New Zealand, is concurrently accredited to Samoa. Samoa maintains an Honorary Consul in New Delhi.

== Diplomatic visits ==
Diplomatic relations between India and Samoa were established in June 1970. India was the second country to establish relations with Samoa, after New Zealand.

INS Tarangini (A75) visited Samoa in January 2004. Members of Indian state legislatures attended the 23rd Commonwealth Parliamentary Seminar in Apia in May 2012. Samoan Minister for Agriculture and Fisheries and Agriculture Store Cooperation attended the 45th COCOTECH APCC meeting held at Kochi in July 2012. He visited Kochi again in February 2015 to attend the Ministerial Meeting of the 51st Asian & Pacific Coconut Community.

Samoan Prime Minister Tuilaepa Aiono Sailele Malielegaoi and the chief executive officer for Finance at Samoa's Central Bank Iulai Lavea visited New Delhi in February 2013 to attend the Asia Leadership Programme on Sustainable Development and Climate Change. Samoan Finance Minister Faumuina Tiatia Faaolatane Liuga led a delegation to attend the 46th Annual meeting of the Board of Governors of ADB at New Delhi in May 2013. Associate Minister for Women Gatoloaifaana Amataga Gidlow represented Samoa at the Second High Level Meeting on South-South Cooperation for Child Rights in Asia and the Pacific held in New Delhi in October 2013. A high-level Indian delegation visited Samoa to participate in the third SIDS Conference held in Apia in September 2014.

Samoa is a member of the Pacific Islands Forum, of which India is an official dialogue partner. Bilateral relations received a boost following the initiation of the Forum for India–Pacific Islands Cooperation by the Narendra Modi government in 2014. Prime Ministers Narendra Modi and Malielegaoi held bilateral talks on the sidelines of the First Pacific Leaders Summit in Suva, Fiji on 19 November 2014. At the request of Prime Minister Modi, Prime Minister Malielegaoi, accompanied by a 5-member delegation, visited India in August 2015 to attend the 2nd Summit of the Forum for India-Pacific Islands Cooperation (FIPIC) at Jaipur. Malielegaoi sought India's assistance in developing the health sector in Samoa.

In March 2017, the Samoan Government began sending patients that could not be treated in Samoa to India. The Government had previously sent such patients to New Zealand. Despite the greater distance between India and Samoa, the cost of medical care in India is much lower than in New Zealand. Prime Minister Malielegaoi praised the quality of doctors in India and stated the new process reduces expenditure for the Samoan Government. Malielegaoi also noted that many of the doctors in New Zealand were also Indians, and announced that the government would bring medical specialists and doctors from India to provide care at Samoan hospitals.

== Trade ==
Bilateral trade between India and Samoa totaled US$4.68 million in 2015–16, rising from $3.66 million the previous fiscal. India exported $2.22 million worth of goods to Samoa and imported $2.46 million. The main commodities exported by India to Samoa are plastic and plastic articles, sugar and confectionery, and electrical machinery and equipment. The major commodities imported by India from Samoa are electrical machinery and equipment, and articles of base metal plastics.

At the 2nd FIPIC Summit, Prime Minister Modi announced that a FIPIC Trade Office would be opened at the FICCI premises in New Delhi. The trade office, named the FIPIC Business Accelerator, was officially opened on 7 September 2015. The Confederation of Indian Industries (CII) has also established a dedicated department at its headquarters in New Delhi focusing on boosting trade with Pacific Island Countries.

India and Samoa signed an agreement for the exchange of tax information in September 2016.

== Cultural relations ==
The XP Division of the Ministry of External Affairs sponsored a familiarization trip for a Samoan journalist to visit India during the 2nd FIPIC Summit in Jaipur in August 2015. A 33-member Indian contingent participated in eight sports events at the 5th Commonwealth Youth Games held in Apia in September 2015. India finishing fifth with 19 medals in the overall medal tally at the Games.

There is a small Indian community in Samoan. Indian nationals in Samoa are mostly professionals working with multilateral agencies, and a few are teachers. As of December 2016, around 25 persons of Indian origin are settled in Samoa.

== Foreign aid ==
India donated three dialysis machines worth almost NZ$123,000 to Samoa in September 2006. In 2007, the Government of Samoa requested that India donate three more dialysis machines, which were delivered in March 2008. The country further requested that 3 dialysis machines be provided biannually to replace the older machines. This request was granted by the Indian government. India provided NZ$66,000 as grant-in-aid in 2009 to fund the procurement of six portable reverse Osmosis systems for the National Kidney Foundation. Samoa was supplied three dialysis machines, one blood volume monitor and one temperature monitor worth NZ$81,000 in May 2011.

India donated $250,000 to help Samoa host the third Small Islands Developing States (SIDS) conference in Apia in September 2014. India announced that it would provide a grant-in-aid of US$100,000 annually to each of the 14 Pacific Island countries, including the Samoa, at the Post Forum Dialogue partner meeting in 2006. The amount was increased to US$125,000 annually from 2009. Prime Minister Malielegaoi attended the First Pacific Leaders Summit on 19 November 2014 held at Suva, Fiji. During the Summit, Indian Prime Minister Modi announced that India would increase the annual grant-in-aid for Samoa to $200,000.

Citizens of Samoa are eligible for scholarships under the Indian Technical and Economic Cooperation Programme (ITEC). Many Samoans have received training in India in the fields of information technology, small scale enterprises, financial management and other areas under ITEC. Samoan officials have trained at National Institute of Small Industry Extension Training (NISIET) in Hyderabad, and at a TERI workshop on sustainable development conducted for the Pacific Island Countries (PIC) in Fiji in 2007. Samoan diplomats have also attended the Professional Course for Foreign Diplomats (PCFD) organised by the Foreign Service Institute (FSI) of the Ministry of External Affairs. Some have also attended a short-term Course for Diplomats of PIC organized by the FSI at Nadi, and the FSI's special training programme for Commonwealth diplomats in New Delhi.

Samoa signed an agreement to establish a Centre of Excellence in IT (CEIT) at the National University of Samoa with Indian assistance.
