= List of diplomatic missions of Kiribati =

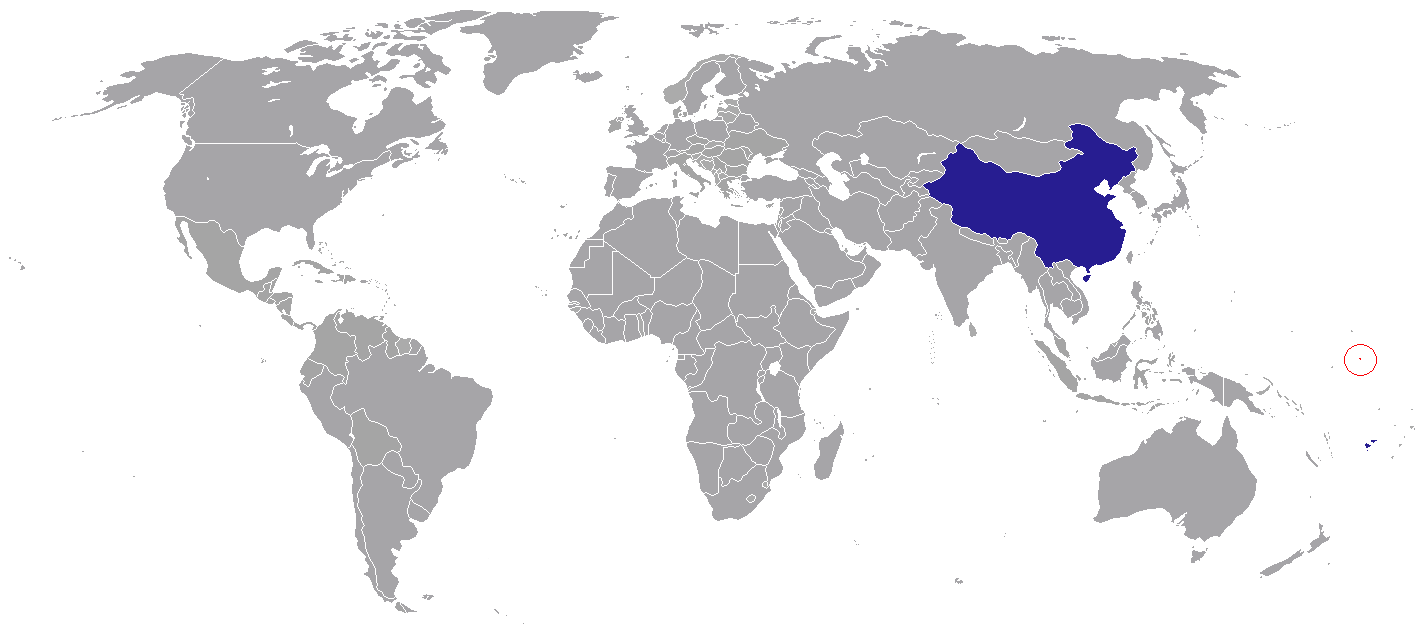
Diplomatic missions of Kiribati

This is a list of diplomatic missions of Kiribati. Kiribati opened its first diplomatic mission in 2002. The choice of Suva reflected the large number of Kiribati residents in the Fijian Islands working and studying, and Suva's prominence as a regional hub for Pacific diplomacy. In addition Sydney, Auckland, Honolulu, Seoul, Hamburg and London have I-Kiribati Honorary Consulates.

Kiribati opened an embassy in Taipei and a permanent mission to the United Nations in New York City in 2013. However, in 2019, President Taneti Maamau decided to recognise the People’s Republic of China and as a result withdrew recognition for the Republic of China (Taiwan) thus closing the Embassy of Kiribati in Taipei.

== Asia ==
- China
  - Beijing (Embassy)

== Oceania ==
- Fiji
  - Suva (High Commission)

== Multilateral organisations ==
- United Nations
  - New York City (Permanent Mission)

== Closed Missions ==
- Taiwan
  - Taipei (Embassy) (closed in 2019)

== See also ==
- Foreign relations of Kiribati
- List of diplomatic missions in Kiribati
