= List of diplomatic missions in Kiribati =

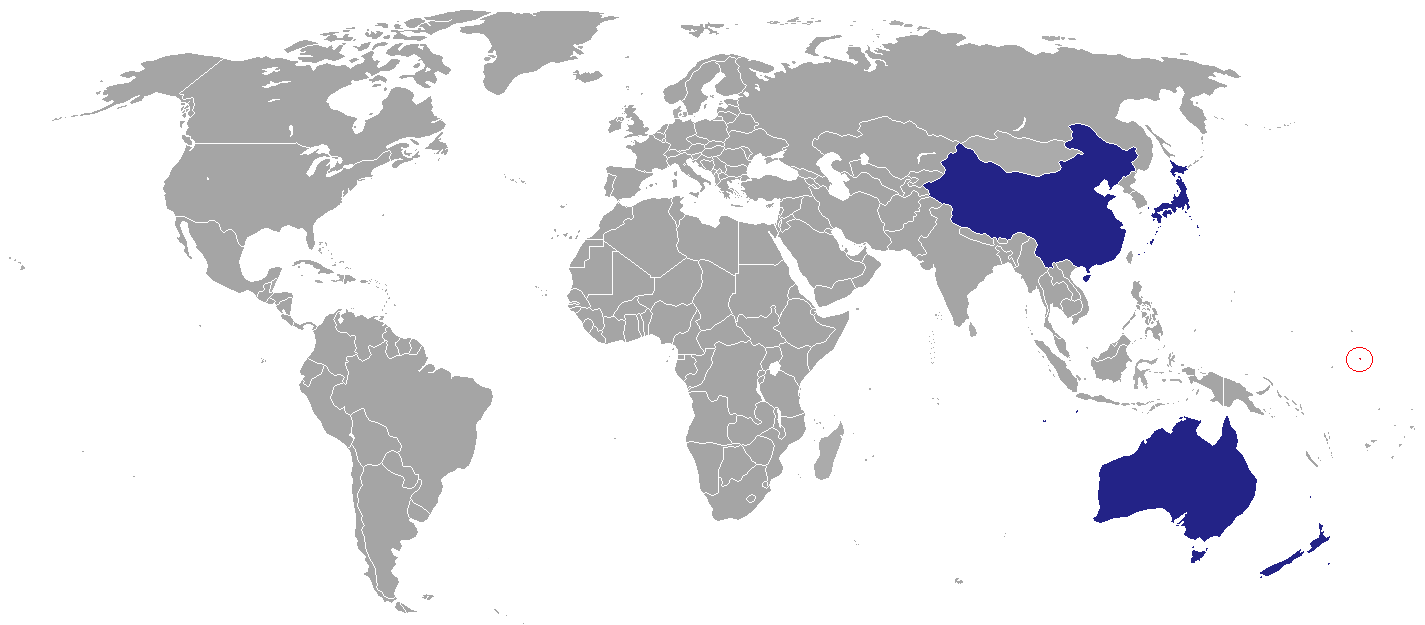
Diplomatic missions in Kiribati

This is a list of diplomatic missions in Kiribati. The capital, South Tarawa, hosts two high commissions and two embassies.

== Embassies/High Commissions in South Tarawa ==
1. Australia
2. China
3. Japan
4. New Zealand

== Former embassies/High commissions ==
- Cuba
- Republic of China (Taiwan) (closed in 2019)
- United Kingdom (closed in 2004)

== Non-Resident Embassies ==
- Austria (Canberra)
- Belgium (Canberra)
- Brazil (Wellington)
- Canada (Wellington)
- Colombia (Canberra)
- Cuba (Suva)
- Czech Republic (Kuala Lumpur)
- Denmark (Singapore)
- Estonia
- Finland (Canberra)
- France (Suva)
- Georgia (Canberra)
- Germany (Wellington)
- Greece (Canberra)
- Indonesia (Suva)
- India (Suva)
- Ireland (Wellington)
- Israel (Jerusalem)
- Italy (Wellington)
- Lesotho (Tokyo)
- Malaysia (Suva)
- Mexico (Kuala Lumpur)
- Morocco (Canberra)
- Netherlands (Wellington)
- Norway (Canberra)
- Philippines (Port Moresby)
- Poland (Canberra)
- Portugal (Canberra)
- Romania (Canberra)
- Russia (Jakarta)
- Seychelles (New York City)
- South Africa (Canberra)
- South Korea (Suva)
- Spain (Wellington)
- Sweden (Canberra)
- Switzerland (Canberra)
- Turkey (Canberra)
- United Kingdom (Suva)
- United States (Suva)
- Vatican City (Wellington)
- European Union (Suva)

== See also ==
- Foreign relations of Kiribati
- List of diplomatic missions of Kiribati
