= Ministry of Foreign Affairs and Immigration =

Government ministry of Kiribati

The Ministry of Foreign Affairs and Immigration (MFAI) is a government ministry of Kiribati. The Minister is the President of Kiribati since its creation.

== Ministers ==
- Sir Ieremia Tabai (1979–1991)
- Teatao Teannaki (1992–1994)
- Teburoro Tito (1994–2003)
- Anote Tong (2003–2016)
- Taneti Maamau (2016–present)

== See also ==
- Foreign relations of Kiribati
