= List of ambassadors of Kiribati to the United States =

Coordinates: 1.325556°N 172.983333°E

Ambassador of Kiribati to the United States
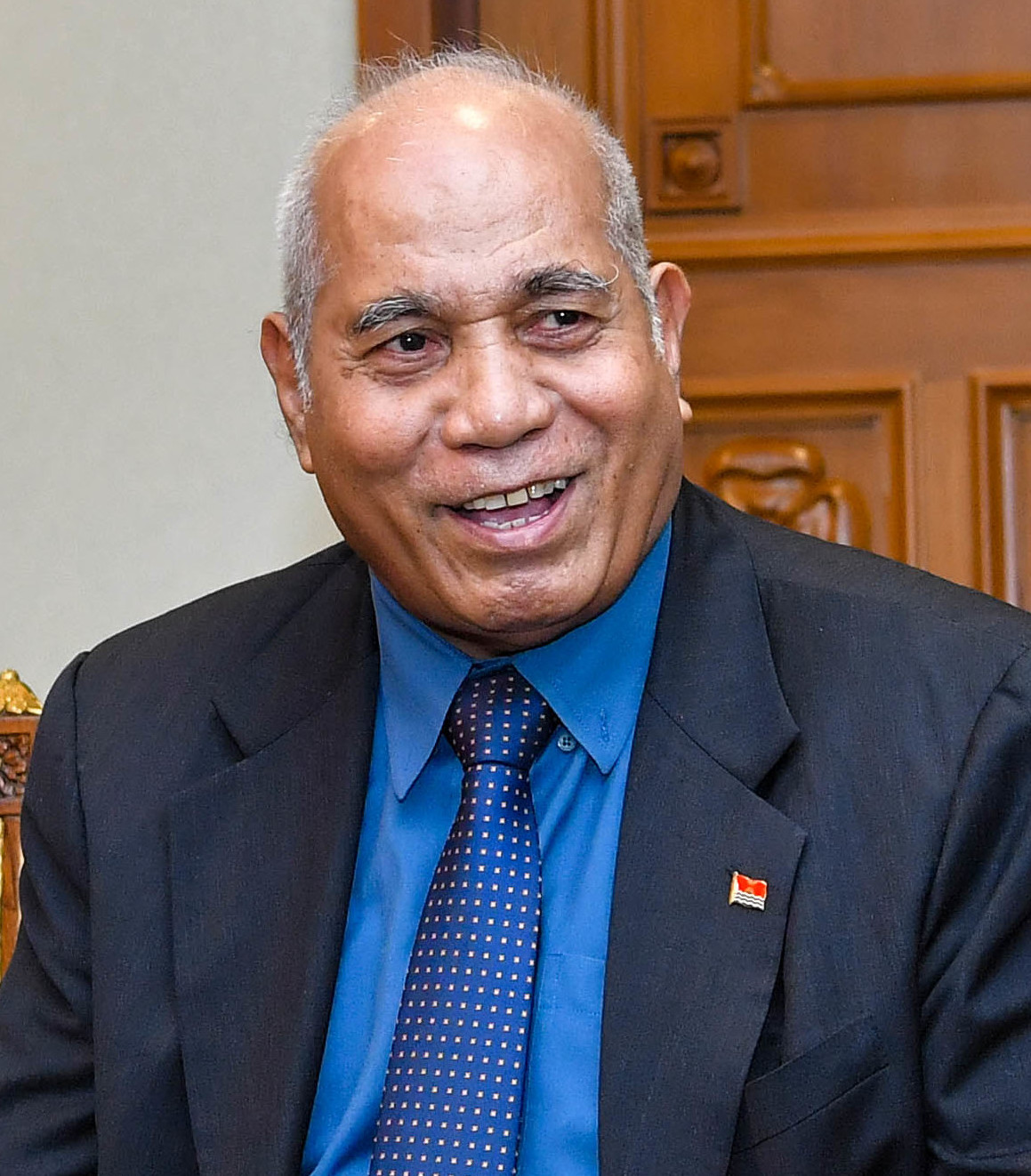
- Incumbent; Teburoro Tito since January 24, 2018
- Inaugural holder: Atanraoi Baiteke
- Formation: July 10, 1981

The Kiribati ambassador accredited in Washington, D. C. is the official representative of the Government in Tarawa to the Government of the United States.

== List of representatives ==
Diplomatic agrément	Diplomatic accreditation	Ambassador	Observations	President of Kiribati	List of presidents of the United States	Term end
July 1, 1981	July 10, 1981	Atanraoi Baiteke	Atanraoi Baiteke, OBE (1979 Birthday Honours) was Secretary General of the South Pacific Commission 1989–1993, Kiribati's first Secretary for Foreign Affairs	Ieremia Tabai	Ronald Reagan	
May 19, 2014	May 21, 2014	Makurita Baaro	The Kiribati Permanent Mission to the UN serves as the Embassy. It is headed by Makurita Baaro (since 21 May 2014)	Anote Tong	Barack Obama	
January 2018	January 24, 2018	Teburoro Tito	The Kiribati Permanent Mission to the UN serves as the Embassy in the US.	Taneti Maamau	Donald Trump; Joe Biden	
