= Indian Technical and Economic Cooperation Programme =

- Awarded for: Technical training, capacity building, and economic cooperation for professionals from developing countries
- Sponsored by: Ministry of External Affairs, Government of India
- Established: September 1964 (62 years ago)
- Website: itecgoi.in

Indian Technical and Economic Cooperation Programme (ITEC) is a bilateral assistance programme run by the Government of India. It is a demand-driven, response-oriented programme that focuses on addressing the needs of developing countries through innovative technological cooperation between India and the partnering nation. Along with its corollary the Special Commonwealth Assistance for Africa Programme, ITEC covers 158 countries across Asia, Africa, Latin America, Central and Eastern Europe, and several Pacific and Caribbean nations. Since its inception, the programme has spent over US$ 2 billion and benefited thousands of students and professionals from around the globe and annual expenditure on the programme has averaged US$ 150 million in recent years.

== History ==
ITEC was officially launched on 15 September 1964 but for decades it remained a marginal programme as India itself was dependent on international aid. ITEC was an important part of India's attempt to contributing to South-South cooperation. India's aid for its neighbours began in the 1950s through assistance to Nepal. However, until the 1990s, India was also the world largest recipient of aid, receiving a cumulative sum of US$ 55 billion since its independence in 1947. The ITEC programme has grown in scope and size since the 2000s as India's economy grew rapidly. With foreign aid it receives accounting for only 0.3% of its GDP, India has now emerged as a net donor of foreign aid. Its National Agricultural Research System under the Indian Council for Agricultural Research, one of the largest in the world, and the Indira Gandhi National Open University have played key roles in facilitating ITEC assistance. South Asia accounts for 70% of the grants dispersed under ITEC. Lines of credit are also offered under ITEC and African nations have been the major beneficiaries under this head.

== Scope of ITEC ==
Assistance under ITEC covers the six areas of training for civil and defence personnel, projects and project related activities such as consultancy services, study tours, donation of equipment, deputation of Indian experts in the partner nation and aid for disaster relief. Personnel training under ITEC covers a wide and varied range of sectors such as banking, IT and computers, personnel management and administrative and scientific areas. ITEC is administered by the Ministry of External Affairs of the Government of India and all expenses including international airfare, boarding, lodging and tuition fees of selected personnel are borne by the Indian authorities. Although ITEC is essentially a bilateral programme, its resources have also been used for financing trilateral and regional undertakings such as with the Economic Commission for Africa, UNIDO and G-77. In Africa, Afro-Asian Rural Reconstruction Organisation, COMESA, the African Union Commission and G-15 receive training and project support under ITEC.

== Augmenting Soft Power ==
The ITEC programme has significantly augmented India's soft power among developing nations. Indian public sector companies such as Hindustan Machine Tools, Water and Power Consultancy Services (WAPCOS), Rail India Technical and Economic Services (RITES) that were closely associated with the programme have been able to establish themselves and become well known in developing countries where they have gone on to bid independently for various projects. It has also helped foster contacts between Indian entrepreneurs with decision makers in other developing countries. While monetary assistance under ITEC remained limited for a long while owing to India's own impoverished conditions, technical advice and training for foreign personnel, deputing Indian civil servants abroad to help poorer governments with their professional expertise and providing training in India for civil servants from abroad all helped provide for good future relations with recipient countries. Hamid Karzai's education in India for instance is seen as one of the key reasons why Afghanistan has warmed up to India ever since the ouster of the Taliban government in 2001. To commemorate its achievements and to bring together beneficiaries of the programme in the host country, Indian embassies and consulates around the globe celebrate an ITEC Day every year.

== An Indian Aid Agency ==
In 2012, the Ministry of External Affairs (MEA) set up a Development Partnership Administration (DPA) under its Economic Relations Division to consolidate outgoing aid and to streamline administrative matters related to such aid. The idea for such an aid agency had been mooted previously by Finance Ministers Jaswant Singh and P Chidambaram variously as the India Development Assistance and the India International Development Cooperation Agency.

== Global Impact of ITEC ==
South Asian nations have traditionally been the largest recipients of Indian aid both as part of ITEC and otherwise. Under the Twelfth Five Year Plan, ₹ 1,500 crore have been earmarked for developmental assistance to Myanmar, Afghanistan and Bhutan. Bhutan has traditionally been the largest recipient of Indian aid. In Afghanistan and Myanmar, India has focused on building infrastructure such as roads, buildings and hospitals besides providing training to their personnel. In Sri Lanka, Indian assistance has focused on rebuilding that country, especially its Tamil majority areas in the north and east that were the worst affected, by fighting during the Sri Lankan Civil War. An important strategy in utilising development aid has been the Small Development Projects (SDP) scheme which focuses on low cost projects that aim at creating infrastructure and technical capabilities that directly affects local communities and supports their socioeconomic development.

ITEC has also been an important component of India's assistance to African nations. In recent years, India has increased its assistance to various African nations and groupings. The focus is now on areas such as transfer of technology and the development of projects like the Pan-African e-Network project that will link African nations with Indian institutions and expertise. India also continues to provide extensive opportunities for human resource development and personnel training in these countries. There is also a special corollary to augment ITEC for African nations called the Special Commonwealth Assistance for Africa Programme (SCAAP).
