= Forum for India–Pacific Islands Cooperation =

Multinational diplomatic conference

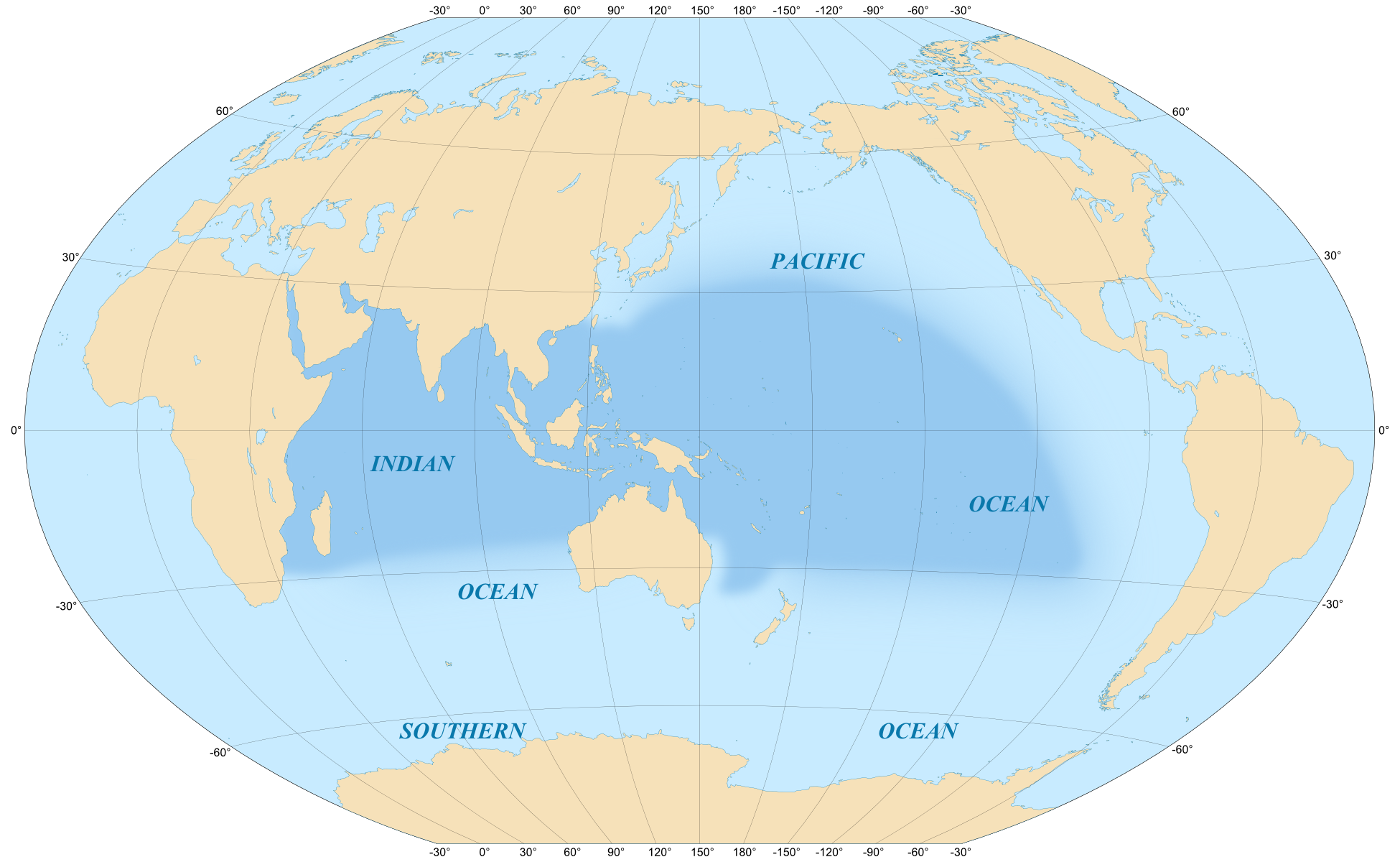
Map of the Indo-Pacific biogeographic region

Forum for India–Pacific Islands Cooperation (FIPIC) is a multinational grouping developed in 2014 for cooperation between the Republic of India and 14 Pacific Islands nations which include Cook Islands, Fiji, Kiribati, Marshall Islands, Federated States of Micronesia, Nauru, Niue, Samoa, Solomon Islands, Palau, Papua New Guinea, Tonga, Tuvalu and Vanuatu. All heads of state or heads of government of the above countries met in Suva, Fiji in November 2014 for the first time where the annual summit was conceptualised.

== Summits ==
=== 1st Summit-Suva, Fiji ===
Prime Minister of India, Narendra Modi chose to visit Fiji soon after democracy was re-established in the island country after 8 years. There apart from bilateral meeting, he also met heads of state/government from 14 pacific island states to enhance India's engagement in the region and proposed a 'Forum for India–Pacific Islands Cooperation' (FIPIC) be held on a regular basis. He conveyed there India's keenness to work closely with Pacific Island nations to advance their development priorities in this regard a number of measures to strengthen India's partnership in the region were proposed which include setting up of a 'special fund of US$1 million' for adapting climate change vis-a-vis clean energy, establishing a 'trade office' in India, 'Pan Pacific Islands e-network' to close the physical distance between the islands by improving digital connectivity, extending visa on arrival at Indian airports for all the fourteen Pacific Island countries, 'space cooperation' in space technology applications for improving the quality of life of the islands, 'training to diplomats' from Pacific Island countries to increase mutual understanding. He also expressed his willingness to host the leaders in any of India's coastal town for the next summit in 2015. It was quite significant to see Chinese Communist Party general secretary Xi Jinping following Modi's trail visited Fiji on 21 November (just 2 days after Modi's trip) to meet a similar gathering of leaders indicating a struggle for influence between the two Asian giants in the island countries of south pacific.

=== 2nd Summit-Jaipur, India ===
One of the key outcome of the first summit in Suva, Fiji was that top leadership of both India and Pacific Islands should meet at a regular interval and an annual summit should be instituted in this regard. Modi invited all the 14 Pacific Islands nations head of states/head of government to India for the next rounds of talks in 2015 and North Indian city of Jaipur, which is also known as "Pink City", was selected to host the main summit on 21 August 2015.

As per of India's extended Act East policy, the South Asian country is actively promoting good relations with smaller islands nations of the South Pacific, along with heavyweights in the region, and cooperating on multiple issues which include blue economy (ocean-based economy), oil and natural gas, mining, IT, health care, fishing and marine research. Space collaboration with Pacific countries are of vital for India as they provide ISRO, India's space administration, an eye to monitor launch of their rockets. Indian President Pranab Mukherjee welcomed all the visiting dignitaries at Rashtrapati Bhavan on 20 August 2015 following which leaders went to Agra, on their way to Jaipur the summit venue, for a tour of famous Taj Mahal. In Jaipur summit, Modi announced to convene international conference on blue economy in New Delhi in 2016 and invited all the experts form the island nations, set up Space Application Center, in partnership with ISRO, in any of the 14 countries and friendly port calls by the Indian Navy. Pacific leaders have expressed their concerns over climate change and its effect on their respective counties. India also assured them to voice their concerns and appropriate measures at the 2015 United Nations Climate Change Conference (COP 21) in Paris. In return all the 14 visiting head of state/government reiterated their support to India's bid for a permanent memberships at the reformed United Nations Security Council. Modi offered to help the Pacific Islands with their hydrography and coastal surveillance, by engaging the Indian Navy. It would help them have a better understanding of their maritime zone and strengthen security of their EEZ.

=== 3rd Summit Port Moresby-Papua, New Guinea ===
In 2023, Prime Minister Narendra Modi visited Papua New Guinea for the Summit on 22 May 2023.
