= List of ambassadors appointed by Joe Biden =

This is a list of United States ambassadors appointed by the 46th president of the United States, Joe Biden.

Biden appointed more ambassadors who are career members of the foreign service compared to former president Donald Trump, who deviated from the 70 percent norm by nominating 56 percent career foreign service members. He was expected to make appointments who would restore America's diplomatic standing after the Trump administration, which included several major campaign donors who were not well received in their host countries. Among the political appointees, more are expected to be policy experts and politicians rather than campaign bundlers.

== Color key ==
- Confirmed appointees who are political appointees (rather than career foreign service officers)
- Confirmed appointees who are Career Members of the Senior Executive Service or Senior Foreign Service.

== Ambassadors to foreign states ==
=== Americas ===
| Office | Nominee | Assumed office | Left office |
|---|---|---|---|
| — Ambassador to Antigua & Barbuda; Ambassador to Barbados; Ambassador to Dominica; Ambassador to Grenada; Ambassador to Saint Kitts & Nevis; Ambassador to Saint Lucia; Ambassador to Saint Vincent & the Grenadines | Roger F. Nyhus | January 19, 2024 (Confirmed November 15, 2023, by voice vote) | January 20, 2025 |
| — Ambassador to Argentina | Marc Stanley | January 24, 2022 (Confirmed December 18, 2021, by voice vote) | January 17, 2025 |
| — Ambassador to Belize | Michelle Kwan | December 5, 2022 (Confirmed September 29, 2022, by voice vote) | January 16, 2025 |
| — Ambassador to Brazil | Elizabeth Frawley Bagley | February 3, 2023 (Confirmed December 14, 2022 by voice vote) | January 20, 2025 |
| — Ambassador to Canada | David L. Cohen | December 7, 2021 (Confirmed November 2, 2021, by voice vote) | January 20, 2025 |
| — Ambassador to Chile | Bernadette Meehan | September 30, 2022 (Confirmed July 20, 2022, 51–44) | January 20, 2025 |
| — Ambassador to Costa Rica | Cynthia Telles | March 11, 2022 (Confirmed December 18, 2021, by voice vote) | January 20, 2025 |
| — Ambassador to Ecuador | Arthur W. Brown | June 26, 2024 (Confirmed May 2, 2024, by voice vote) | April 17, 2025 |
| — Ambassador to El Salvador | William H. Duncan | February 2, 2023 (Confirmed December 13, 2022 by voice vote) | July 31, 2025 |
| — Ambassador to Guatemala | Tobin John Bradley | February 12, 2024 (Confirmed December 20, 2023 by voice vote) | January 17, 2026 |
| — Ambassador to Guyana | Nicole D. Theriot | October 23, 2023 (Confirmed July 27, 2023 by voice vote) | — |
| — Ambassador to Haiti | Dennis B. Hankins | May 3, 2024 (Confirmed March 14, 2024, 89–1) | June 11, 2025 |
| — Ambassador to Honduras | Laura Farnsworth Dogu | April 12, 2022 (Confirmed March 10, 2022, by voice vote) | April 18, 2025 |
| — Ambassador to Jamaica | N. Nick Perry | May 13, 2022 (Confirmed March 10, 2022, by voice vote) | January 20, 2025 |
| — Ambassador to Mexico | Ken Salazar | September 14, 2021 (Confirmed August 11, 2021, by voice vote) | January 7, 2025 |
| — Ambassador to Nicaragua | Hugo F. Rodriguez | TBD (Confirmed September 29, 2022, by voice vote) | — |
| — Ambassador to Panama | Mari Aponte | November 21, 2022 (Confirmed September 29, 2022, by voice vote) | January 20, 2025 |
| — Ambassador to Paraguay | Marc Ostfield | March 9, 2022 (Confirmed December 18, 2021, by voice vote) | January 20, 2025 |
| — Ambassador to Peru | Stephanie Syptak-Ramnath | June 20, 2024 (Confirmed May 2, 2024, by voice vote) | April 18, 2025 |
| — Ambassador to Suriname | Robert J. Faucher | January 31, 2023 (Confirmed December 13, 2022 by voice vote) | January 28, 2026 |
| — Ambassador to Trinidad and Tobago | Candace Bond | December 8, 2022 (Confirmed September 29, 2022, by voice vote) | January 20, 2025 |
| — Ambassador to Uruguay | Heide B. Fulton | March 22, 2023 (Confirmed December 13, 2022 by voice vote) | June 27, 2025 |

=== Africa ===
| Office | Nominee | Assumed office | Left office |
|---|---|---|---|
| — Ambassador to Algeria | Elizabeth Moore Aubin | February 9, 2022 (Confirmed December 18, 2021, by voice vote) | January 16, 2026 |
| — Ambassador to Angola; Ambassador to São Tomé and Príncipe | Tulinabo S. Mushingi | March 9, 2022 (Confirmed December 18, 2021, by voice vote) | October 22, 2024 |
| — Ambassador to Benin | Brian W. Shukan | May 5, 2022 (Confirmed December 18, 2021, by voice vote) | February 20, 2026 |
| — Ambassador to Botswana | Howard Van Vranken | May 24, 2023 (Confirmed December 22, 2022 by voice vote) | August 26, 2026 |
| — Ambassador to Burkina Faso | Joann Lockard | June 28, 2024 (Confirmed May 2, 2024, by voice vote) | — |
| — Ambassador to Burundi | Lisa Peterson | June 27, 2024 (Confirmed May 2, 2024, by voice vote) | January 18, 2026 |
| — Ambassador to Cameroon | Christopher Lamora | March 21, 2022 (Confirmed December 18, 2021, by voice vote) | January 17, 2026 |
| — Ambassador to Cape Verde | Jennifer M. Adams | September 10, 2024 (Confirmed May 2, 2024, by voice vote) | January 16, 2026 |
| — Ambassador to the Central African Republic | Patricia A. Mahoney | April 8, 2022 (Confirmed December 18, 2021, by voice vote) | March 27, 2025 |
| — Ambassador to Chad | Alexander M. Laskaris | August 18, 2022 (Confirmed July 14, 2022, by voice vote) | February 28, 2025 |
| — Ambassador to the Republic of the Congo | Eugene S. Young | March 30, 2022 (Confirmed December 18, 2021, by voice vote) | July 10, 2025 |
| — Ambassador to the Democratic Republic of the Congo | Lucy Tamlyn | February 6, 2023 (Confirmed December 20, 2022, by voice vote) | December 31, 2025 |
| — Ambassador to Djibouti | Cynthia Kierscht | October 17, 2024 (Confirmed May 2, 2024, by voice vote) | — |
| — Ambassador to Egypt | Herro Mustafa | November 15, 2023 (Confirmed November 1, 2023 by voice vote) | January 17, 2026 |
| — Ambassador to Equatorial Guinea | David R. Gilmour | May 22, 2022 (Confirmed December 18, 2021, by voice vote) | October 1, 2026 |
| — Ambassador to Ethiopia | Ervin Jose Massinga | October 3, 2023 (Confirmed July 27, 2023 by voice vote) | — |
| — Ambassador to Gabon | Vernelle FitzPatrick | January 26, 2024 (Confirmed November 29, 2023, by voice vote) | January 16, 2026 |
| — Ambassador to the Gambia | Sharon L. Cromer | March 18, 2022 (Confirmed December 18, 2021, by voice vote) | August 21, 2025 |
| — Ambassador to Ghana | Virginia E. Palmer | May 10, 2022 (Confirmed March 2, 2022, by voice vote) | May 28, 2025 |
| — Ambassador to Guinea | Troy D. Fitrell | January 19, 2022 (Confirmed December 18, 2021, by voice vote) | January 20, 2025 |
| — Ambassador to Ivory Coast | Jessica Davis Ba | March 2, 2023 (Confirmed December 15, 2022 by voice vote) | January 16, 2026 |
| — Ambassador to Kenya | Meg Whitman | August 5, 2022 (Confirmed July 14, 2022, by voice vote) | November 13, 2024 |
| — Ambassador to Lesotho | Maria E. Brewer | March 10, 2022 (Confirmed December 18, 2021, by voice vote) | April 12, 2024 |
| — Ambassador to Liberia | Mark Toner | August 7, 2024 (Confirmed May 2, 2024, by voice vote) | August 4, 2025 |
| — Ambassador to Madagascar; Ambassador to Comoros | Claire A. Pierangelo | June 29, 2022 (Confirmed March 2, 2022, by voice vote) | January 29, 2026 |
| — Ambassador to Malawi | David Young | May 5, 2022 (Confirmed March 2, 2022, by voice vote) | February 12, 2024 |
| — Ambassador to Mali | Rachna Korhonen | March 16, 2023 (Confirmed December 13, 2022 by voice vote) | September 5, 2026 |
| — Ambassador to Mauritius | Henry V. Jardine | February 22, 2023 (Confirmed December 13, 2022 by voice vote); *Originally confirmed as the ambassador to Mauritius and Seychelles* | January 16, 2026 |
| — Ambassador to Morocco | Puneet Talwar | November 21, 2022 (Confirmed September 8, 2022 by voice vote) | January 20, 2025 |
| — Ambassador to Mozambique | Peter H. Vrooman | March 3, 2022 (Confirmed December 18, 2021, by voice vote) | May 29, 2025 |
| — Ambassador to Namibia | Randy W. Berry | February 9, 2023 (Confirmed September 20, 2022 by voice vote) | December 31, 2024 |
| — Ambassador to Niger | Kathleen A. FitzGibbon | August 19, 2023 (Confirmed July 27, 2023 by voice vote) | January 16, 2026 |
| — Ambassador to Nigeria | Richard Mills Jr. | July 25, 2024 (Confirmed May 2, 2024, by voice vote) | January 16, 2026 |
| — Ambassador to Rwanda | Eric W. Kneedler | October 18, 2023 (Confirmed July 27, 2023 by voice vote) | January 14, 2026 |
| — Ambassador to Senegal; Ambassador to Guinea-Bissau | Michael A. Raynor | March 10, 2022 (Confirmed December 18, 2021, by voice vote) | January 15, 2026 |
| — Ambassador to Sierra Leone | Bryan David Hunt | September 11, 2023 (Confirmed July 27, 2023 by voice vote) | September 17, 2025 |
| — Ambassador to Somalia | Richard H. Riley IV | June 21, 2024 (Confirmed May 2, 2024, by voice vote) | January 15, 2026 |
| — Ambassador to Somalia | Larry André Jr. | February 7, 2022 (Confirmed December 18, 2021, by voice vote) | May 30, 2023 |
| — Ambassador to South Africa | Reuben Brigety | August 11, 2022 (Confirmed July 21, 2022, 55–40) | January 3, 2025 |
| — Ambassador to South Sudan | Michael J. Adler | August 24, 2022 (Confirmed July 14, 2022, by voice vote) | — |
| — Ambassador to Sudan | John T. Godfrey | September 1, 2022 (Confirmed July 14, 2022, by voice vote) | February 23, 2024 |
| — Ambassador to Tanzania | Michael Battle | February 27, 2023 (Confirmed December 13, 2022 by voice vote) | January 15, 2025 |
| — Ambassador to Togo | Elizabeth Fitzsimmons | April 26, 2022 (Confirmed December 18, 2021, by voice vote) | May 30, 2024 |
| — Ambassador to Tunisia | Joey R. Hood | February 2, 2023 (Confirmed December 22, 2022 by voice vote) | October 23, 2025 |
| — Ambassador to Uganda | William W. Popp | September 20, 2023 (Confirmed July 27, 2023 by voice vote) | June 2, 2026 |
| — Ambassador to Zambia | Michael C. Gonzales | September 16, 2022 (Confirmed August 4, 2022, by voice vote) | April 30, 2026 |
| — Ambassador to Zimbabwe | Pamela Tremont | July 17, 2024 (Confirmed May 2, 2024, by voice vote) | — |

=== Asia ===
| Office | Nominee | Assumed office | Left office |
|---|---|---|---|
| — Ambassador to Bangladesh | Peter D. Haas | March 15, 2022 (Confirmed December 18, 2021, by voice vote) | July 23, 2024 |
| — Ambassador to Brunei Darussalam | Caryn McClelland | May 24, 2022 (Confirmed December 18, 2021, by voice vote) | June 30, 2026 |
| — Ambassador to China | R. Nicholas Burns | April 1, 2022 (Confirmed December 16, 2021, 75–18) | January 18, 2025 |
| — Ambassador to India | Eric Garcetti | May 11, 2023 (Confirmed March 15, 2023, 52–42) | January 20, 2025 |
| — Ambassador to Indonesia | Kamala Shirin Lakhdhir | August 8, 2024 (Confirmed May 2, 2024, by voice vote) | April 30, 2025 |
| — Ambassador to Japan | Rahm Emanuel | March 25, 2022 (Confirmed December 18, 2021, 48–21) | January 15, 2025 |
| — Ambassador to Kazakhstan | Daniel N. Rosenblum | November 14, 2022 (Confirmed August 4, 2022, by voice vote) | January 20, 2025 |
| — Ambassador to Kyrgyzstan | Lesslie Viguerie | December 29, 2022 (Confirmed September 29, 2022, by voice vote) | September 25, 2026 |
| — Ambassador to Laos | Heather Variava | February 6, 2024 (Confirmed November 29, 2023, by voice vote) | January 16, 2026 |
| — Ambassador to Malaysia | Edgard Kagan | March 20, 2024 (Confirmed November 8, 2023, by voice vote) | February 15, 2026 |
| — Ambassador to the Maldives | Hugo Yon | September 6, 2023 (Confirmed July 27, 2023 by voice vote) | December 10, 2025 |
| Ambassador to Mongolia | Richard Buangan | November 17, 2022 (Confirmed August 4, 2022, by voice vote) | — |
| — Ambassador to Nepal | Dean R. Thompson | October 21, 2022 (Confirmed August 4, 2022, by voice vote) | January 16, 2026 |
| — Ambassador to Pakistan | Donald Blome | July 1, 2022 (Confirmed March 1, 2022, by voice vote) | January 10, 2025 |
| — Ambassador to the Philippines | MaryKay Carlson | July 22, 2022 (Confirmed May 5, 2022, by voice vote) | January 16, 2026 |
| — Ambassador to Singapore | Jonathan E. Kaplan | December 6, 2021 (Confirmed November 19, 2021, by voice vote) | January 20, 2025 |
| — Ambassador to South Korea | Philip S. Goldberg | July 12, 2022 (Confirmed May 5, 2022, by voice vote) | January 10, 2025 |
| — Ambassador to Sri Lanka | Julie J. Chung | February 25, 2022 (Confirmed December 18, 2021, by voice vote) | January 16, 2026 |
| — Ambassador to Tajikistan | Manuel P. Micaller | March 9, 2023 (Confirmed December 13, 2022 by voice vote) | January 20, 2026 |
| — Ambassador to Thailand | Robert F. Godec | October 7, 2022 (Confirmed August 4, 2022, by voice vote) | December 1, 2025 |
| — Ambassador to Timor-Leste | Donna Ann Welton | July 16, 2024 (Confirmed May 7, 2024, 52–40) | February 24, 2025 |
| — Ambassador to Turkmenistan | Elizabeth Rood | July 31, 2024 (Confirmed May 2, 2024, by voice vote) | July 20, 2026 |
| — Ambassador to Uzbekistan | Jonathan Henick | November 24, 2022 (Confirmed August 4, 2022, by voice vote) | — |
| — Ambassador to Vietnam | Marc Knapper | February 11, 2022 (Confirmed December 18, 2021, by voice vote) | January 18, 2026 |

=== Europe ===
| Office | Nominee | Assumed office | Left office |
|---|---|---|---|
| — Ambassador to Armenia | Kristina Kvien | February 21, 2023 (Confirmed December 13, 2022 by voice vote) | January 16, 2026 |
| — Ambassador to Austria | Victoria Reggie Kennedy | January 12, 2022 (Confirmed October 26, 2021, by voice vote) | January 20, 2025 |
| — Ambassador to Azerbaijan | Mark W. Libby | January 18, 2024 (Confirmed November 8, 2023, by voice vote) | January 18, 2025 |
| — Ambassador to Belgium | Michael M. Adler | March 15, 2022 (Confirmed December 18, 2021, by voice vote) | January 15, 2025 |
| — Ambassador to Bosnia and Herzegovina | Michael J. Murphy | February 23, 2022 (Confirmed December 18, 2021, by voice vote) | February 15, 2025 |
| — Ambassador to Bulgaria | Kenneth H. Merten | April 7, 2023 (Confirmed December 13, 2022 by voice vote) | January 29, 2025 |
| — Ambassador to Croatia | Nathalie Rayes | January 25, 2024 (Confirmed December 6, 2023, 53–47) | January 20, 2025 |
| — Ambassador to Cyprus | Julie D. Fisher | February 21, 2023 (Confirmed December 13, 2022 by voice vote) | May 14, 2026 |
| — Ambassador to the Czech Republic | Bijan Sabet | February 15, 2023 (Confirmed December 13, 2022 by voice vote) | January 20, 2025 |
| — Ambassador to Denmark | Alan M. Leventhal | July 1, 2022 (Confirmed June 15, 2022, 63–32) | January 20, 2025 |
| — Ambassador to Estonia | George P. Kent | February 21, 2023 (Confirmed December 13, 2022 by voice vote) | January 20, 2025 |
| — Ambassador to Finland | Doug Hickey | May 11, 2022 (Confirmed March 24, 2022, by voice vote) | September 20, 2024 |
| — Ambassador to France; Ambassador to Monaco | Denise Bauer | February 5, 2022 (Confirmed December 18, 2021, by voice vote) | January 20, 2025 |
| — Ambassador to Georgia | Robin Dunnigan | October 12, 2023 (Confirmed July 27, 2023 by voice vote) | July 15, 2025 |
| — Ambassador to Germany | Amy Gutmann | February 17, 2022 (Confirmed February 8, 2022, 54–42) | July 13, 2024 |
| — Ambassador to Greece | George J. Tsunis | May 10, 2022 (Confirmed March 10, 2022, by voice vote) | January 20, 2025 |
| — Ambassador to the Holy See | Joe Donnelly | April 11, 2022 (Confirmed January 20, 2022, by voice vote) | July 8, 2024 |
| — Ambassador to Hungary | David Pressman | September 14, 2022 (Confirmed July 28, 2022, 61–30) | January 13, 2025 |
| — Ambassador to Iceland | Carrin Patman | October 6, 2022 (Confirmed August 7, 2022, by voice vote) | January 18, 2025 |
| — Ambassador to Ireland | Claire D. Cronin | February 10, 2022 (Confirmed December 18, 2021, by voice vote) | January 20, 2025 |
| — Ambassador to Italy; Ambassador to San Marino | Jack Markell | September 23, 2023 (Confirmed July 27, 2023 by voice vote) | January 11, 2025 |
| — Ambassador to Kosovo | Jeff Hovenier | January 10, 2022 (Confirmed November 18, 2021, by voice vote) | December 30, 2024 |
| — Ambassador to Latvia | Christopher T. Robinson | February 21, 2023 (Confirmed December 13, 2022 by voice vote) | December 29, 2025 |
| — Ambassador to Lithuania | Kara McDonald | January 26, 2024 (Confirmed November 29, 2023, by voice vote) | — |
| — Ambassador to Luxembourg | Tom Barrett | February 10, 2022 (Confirmed December 16, 2021, by voice vote) | January 17, 2025 |
| — Ambassador to Malta | Constance J. Milstein | October 27, 2022 (Confirmed August 7, 2022, 57–34) | January 20, 2025 |
| — Ambassador to Moldova | Kent D. Logsdon | February 16, 2022 (Confirmed December 18, 2021, by voice vote) | May 30, 2024 |
| — Ambassador to the Netherlands | Shefali Razdan Duggal | October 19, 2022 (Confirmed September 14, 2022 by voice vote) | January 20, 2025 |
| — Ambassador to North Macedonia | Angela P. Aggeler | November 8, 2022 (Confirmed August 4, 2022, by voice vote) | January 22, 2026 |
| — Ambassador to Norway | Marc B. Nathanson | June 16, 2022 (Confirmed May 5, 2022, by voice vote) | February 14, 2024 |
| — Ambassador to Poland | Mark Brzezinski | February 22, 2022 (Confirmed December 18, 2021, by voice vote) | January 20, 2025 |
| — Ambassador to Portugal | Randi Levine | April 22, 2022 (Confirmed March 10, 2022, by voice vote) | January 20, 2025 |
| — Ambassador to Romania | Kathleen A. Kavalec | February 14, 2023 (Confirmed December 15, 2022 by voice vote) | May 20, 2025 |
| — Ambassador to Russia | Lynne M. Tracy | January 30, 2023 (Confirmed December 21, 2022, 93–2) | June 27, 2025 |
| — Ambassador to Serbia | Christopher R. Hill | March 31, 2022 (Confirmed March 10, 2022, by voice vote) | January 10, 2025 |
| — Ambassador to Slovakia | Gautam A. Rana | September 28, 2022 (Confirmed August 4, 2022, by voice vote) | January 16, 2026 |
| — Ambassador to Slovenia | Jamie Harpootlian | February 17, 2022 (Confirmed December 18, 2021, by voice vote) | July 31, 2024 |
| — Ambassador to Spain; Ambassador to Andorra | Julissa Reynoso Pantaleón | February 2, 2022 (Confirmed December 18, 2021, by voice vote) | July 12, 2024 |
| — Ambassador to Sweden | Erik Ramanathan | January 20, 2022 (Confirmed December 18, 2021, by voice vote) | January 20, 2025 |
| — Ambassador to Switzerland; Ambassador to Liechtenstein | Scott Miller | January 11, 2022 (Confirmed December 18, 2021, by voice vote) | January 20, 2025 |
| — Ambassador to Ukraine | Bridget A. Brink | May 30, 2022 (Confirmed May 18, 2022, by voice vote) | April 21, 2025 |
| — Ambassador to the United Kingdom | Jane D. Hartley | July 19, 2022 (Confirmed May 25, 2022, by voice vote) | January 20, 2025 |

=== Middle East ===
| Office | Nominee | Assumed office | Left office |
|---|---|---|---|
| — Ambassador to Bahrain | Steven C. Bondy | February 9, 2022 (Confirmed December 18, 2021, by voice vote) | September 14, 2025 |
| — Ambassador to Iraq | Alina Romanowski | June 2, 2022 (Confirmed March 24, 2022, by voice vote) | December 7, 2024 |
| — Ambassador to Israel | Jack Lew | November 5, 2023 (Confirmed October 31, 2023, 53–43) | January 20, 2025 |
| — Ambassador to Israel | Thomas R. Nides | December 5, 2021 (Confirmed November 3, 2021, by voice vote) | July 21, 2023 |
| — Ambassador to Jordan | Yael Lempert | September 3, 2023 (Confirmed July 27, 2023 by voice vote) | January 20, 2025 |
| — Ambassador to Kuwait | Karen Sasahara | November 26, 2023 (Confirmed October 16, 2023, by voice vote) | July 9, 2025 |
| — Ambassador to Lebanon | Lisa A. Johnson | January 11, 2024 (Confirmed December 14, 2023, by voice vote) | September 28, 2025 |
| — Ambassador to Oman | Ana A. Escrogima | December 4, 2023 (Confirmed October 17, 2023, by voice vote) | — |
| — Ambassador to Qatar | Timmy T. Davis | September 13, 2022 (Confirmed August 4, 2022, by voice vote) | June 15, 2025 |
| — Ambassador to Saudi Arabia | Michael Ratney | April 27, 2023 (Confirmed March 14, 2023, by voice vote) | January 20, 2025 |
| — Ambassador to Turkey | Jeff Flake | January 26, 2022 (Confirmed October 26, 2021, by voice vote) | September 1, 2024 |
| — Ambassador to the United Arab Emirates | Martina A. Strong | October 4, 2023 (Confirmed July 27, 2023 by voice vote) | August 5, 2025 |
| — Ambassador to Yemen | Steven Fagin | June 1, 2022 (Confirmed April 7, 2022, by voice vote) | July 3, 2026 |

=== Oceania ===
| Office | Nominee | Assumed office | Left office |
|---|---|---|---|
| — Ambassador to Australia | Caroline Kennedy | July 25, 2022 (Confirmed May 5, 2022, by voice vote) | November 28, 2024 |
| — Ambassador to Fiji; Ambassador to Kiribati; Ambassador to Nauru; Ambassador to Tonga; Ambassador to Tuvalu | Marie Damour | November 24, 2022 (Confirmed August 4, 2022, by voice vote) | January 16, 2026 |
| — Ambassador to the Marshall Islands | Laura Stone | July 12, 2024 (Confirmed May 2, 2024, by voice vote) | January 12, 2026 |
| — Ambassador to Micronesia | Jennifer L. Johnson | September 13, 2023 (Confirmed July 27, 2023 by voice vote) | June 9, 2026 |
| — Ambassador to New Zealand | Tom Udall | December 2, 2021 (Confirmed October 26, 2021, by voice vote); *Originally confirmed as the ambassador to New Zealand and Samoa* | January 14, 2025 |
| — Ambassador to Palau | Joel Ehrendreich | September 29, 2023 (Confirmed July 27, 2023 by voice vote) | May 4, 2026 |
| — Ambassador to Papua New Guinea; Ambassador to Vanuatu | Ann M. Yastishock | February 21, 2024 (Confirmed November 29, 2023, by voice vote); *Originally confirmed as the ambassador to Papua New Guinea, the Solomon Islands and Vanuatu* | January 16, 2026 |

== Ambassadors to international organizations ==
=== United States Mission to the United Nations ===
| Office | Nominee | Assumed office | Left office |
|---|---|---|---|
| — Representative to the United Nations and Representative in the Security Council of the United Nations (with the rank of ambassador) | Linda Thomas-Greenfield | February 25, 2021 (Confirmed February 23, 2021, 78–20) | January 20, 2025 |
| — Deputy Representative to the United Nations and Deputy Representative in the Security Council of the United Nations (with the rank of ambassador) | Dorothy Shea | August 16, 2024 (Confirmed August 1, 2024, 59–34) | November 22, 2025 |
| — Representative to the United Nations and Other International Organizations in Geneva (with the rank of ambassador) | Bathsheba Nell Crocker | January 18, 2022 (Confirmed December 18, 2021, by voice vote) | January 20, 2025 |
| — Representative to the Vienna Office of the United Nations (with the rank of ambassador) | Laura Holgate | February 1, 2022 (Confirmed December 18, 2021, by voice vote) | January 20, 2025 |
| — Representative to the United Nations Agencies for Food and Agriculture (with the rank of ambassador) | Jeffrey Prescott | April 3, 2024 (Confirmed February 8, 2024, by voice vote) | January 20, 2025 |
| — Representative to the United Nations Agencies for Food and Agriculture (with the rank of ambassador) | Cindy McCain | November 5, 2021 (Confirmed October 26, 2021, by voice vote) | April 5, 2023 |
| — Representative to the United Nations for U.N. Management and Reform (with the rank of ambassador) | Chris Lu | January 4, 2022 (Confirmed December 18, 2021, by voice vote) | January 20, 2025 |
| — Representative to the United Nations Human Rights Council (with the rank of ambassador) | Michèle Taylor | February 22, 2022 (Confirmed February 17, 2022, by voice vote) | January 20, 2025 |
| — Representative to the Economic and Social Council of the United Nations (with the rank of ambassador) | Lisa A. Carty | March 2, 2022 (Confirmed February 8, 2022, 68–27) | January 20, 2025 |
| — Representative to the United Nations Educational, Scientific, and Cultural Organization (with the rank of ambassador) | Courtney O'Donnell | July 5, 2024 (Confirmed May 15, 2024, 49–45) | January 20, 2025 |
| — Alternate Representative for Special Political Affairs in the United Nations (with the rank of ambassador) | Robert A. Wood | October 6, 2022 (Confirmed September 20, 2022 by voice vote) | — January 20, 2025 |

=== Other international organizations ===
| Office | Nominee | Assumed office | Left office |
|---|---|---|---|
| — Representative to the African Union (with the rank of ambassador) | Stephanie S. Sullivan | August 29, 2024 (Confirmed June 20, 2024, 45–26) | December 30, 2025 |
| — Senior Official for Asia-Pacific Economic Cooperation (with the rank of ambassador) | Matt Murray | October 6, 2023 (Confirmed July 27, 2023 by voice vote) | July 11, 2025 |
| — Director of the Asian Development Bank (with the rank of ambassador) | Chantale Wong | February 23, 2022 (Confirmed February 8, 2022, 66–31) | January 20, 2025 |
| — Representative to the Association of Southeast Asian Nations (with the rank of ambassador) | Yohannes Abraham | October 5, 2022 (Confirmed August 4, 2022, by voice vote) | August 27, 2024 |
| — Representative to the Conference on Disarmament (with the rank of ambassador) | Bruce I. Turner | September 22, 2022 (Confirmed September 13, 2022, by voice vote) | January 20, 2025 |
| — Representative to the European Union (with the rank of ambassador) | Mark Gitenstein | January 24, 2022 (Confirmed December 18, 2021, by voice vote) | January 17, 2025 |
| — Representative to the International Atomic Energy Agency (with the rank of ambassador) | Laura Holgate | April 8, 2022 (Confirmed March 29, 2022, by voice vote) | January 20, 2025 |
| — Representative on the Council of the International Civil Aviation Organization (with the rank of ambassador) | Sully Sullenberger | February 3, 2022 (Confirmed December 2, 2021, by voice vote) | July 1, 2022 |
| — Permanent Representative on the Council of the North Atlantic Treaty Organization (with the rank of ambassador) | Julianne Smith | December 6, 2021 (Confirmed November 18, 2021, by voice vote) | October 23, 2024 |
| — Permanent Representative to the Organization of American States (with the rank of ambassador) | Francisco O. Mora | January 18, 2023 (Confirmed December 14, 2022, 51–45) | January 11, 2025 |
| — Representative to the Organization for Economic Co-operation and Development (with the rank of ambassador) | Sean Patrick Maloney | April 2, 2024 (Confirmed March 12, 2024, 63–31) | January 20, 2025 |
| — Representative to the Organization for Economic Co-operation and Development (with the rank of ambassador) | Jack Markell | February 11, 2022 (Confirmed December 18, 2021, by voice vote) | August 21, 2023 |
| — Representative to the Organization for the Prohibition of Chemical Weapons (with the rank of ambassador) | Nicole Shampaine | April 12, 2024 (Confirmed February 6, 2024, by voice vote) | — |
| — Representative to the Organization for Security and Cooperation in Europe (with the rank of ambassador) | Michael R. Carpenter | November 29, 2021 (Confirmed November 3, 2021, by voice vote) | April 4, 2024 |

== Ambassadors-at-large ==
| Office | Nominee | Assumed office | Left office |
|---|---|---|---|
| — Ambassador-at-Large for Arctic Affairs | Michael Sfraga | October 1, 2024 (Confirmed September 24, 2024, 55–36) | January 20, 2025 |
| — Coordinator for Counterterrorism (with the rank of ambassador-at-large) | Elizabeth H. Richard | December 29, 2023 (Confirmed December 19, 2023, 49–15) | January 20, 2025 |
| — Ambassador-at-Large for Cyberspace and Digital Policy | Nate Fick | September 21, 2022 (Confirmed September 15, 2022 by voice vote) | January 20, 2025 |
| — Ambassador-at-Large for Global Criminal Justice | Beth Van Schaack | March 17, 2022 (Confirmed March 15, 2022, by voice vote) | January 20, 2025 |
| — Ambassador-at-Large and Coordinator of United States Government Activities to Combat HIV/AIDS Globally | John Nkengasong | June 13, 2022 (Confirmed May 5, 2022, by voice vote) | January 20, 2025 |
| — Ambassador-at-Large for Global Women's Issues | Geeta Rao Gupta | May 18, 2023 (Confirmed May 10, 2023, 51–47) | January 20, 2025 |
| — Ambassador-at-Large for International Religious Freedom | Rashad Hussain | January 24, 2022 (Confirmed December 16, 2021, 85–5) | January 20, 2025 |
| — Director of the Office to Monitor and Combat Trafficking (with the rank of ambassador-at-large) | Cindy Dyer | January 4, 2023 (Confirmed December 20, 2022, by voice vote) | January 20, 2025 |

== Trade representatives ==
| Office | Nominee | Assumed office | Left office |
|---|---|---|---|
| — United States Trade Representative (with the rank of ambassador) | Katherine Tai | March 18, 2021 (Confirmed March 17, 2021, 98–0) | January 20, 2025 |
| — Deputy United States Trade Representative for Asia, Africa, Investment, Services, Textiles, and Industrial Competitiveness (with the rank of ambassador) | Sarah Bianchi | October 4, 2021 (Confirmed September 23, 2021, 85–11) | January 29, 2024 |
| — Deputy United States Trade Representative for the Office of Geneva (with the rank of ambassador) | Maria Pagan | March 14, 2022 (Confirmed March 10, 2022, 80–19) | January 20, 2025 |
| — Deputy United States Trade Representative for Western Hemisphere, Europe, the Middle East, Labor, and Environment (with the rank of ambassador) | Jayme White | September 27, 2021 (Confirmed September 22, 2021, 80–18) | November 1, 2023 |
| — Chief Agricultural Negotiator of the Office of the United States Trade Representative (with the rank of ambassador) | Doug McKalip | January 9, 2023 (Confirmed December 22, 2022 by voice vote) | January 20, 2025 |

== Other positions with rank of ambassador ==
| Office | Nominee | Assumed office | Left office |
|---|---|---|---|
| — Chief of Protocol (with the rank of ambassador) | Rufus Gifford | January 3, 2022 (Confirmed December 18, 2021, by voice vote) | July 28, 2023 |
| – Coordinator for International Communications and Information Policy (with the rank of ambassador) | Stephan A. Lang | June 28, 2024 (Confirmed May 14, 2024, by voice vote) | July 11, 2025 |
| — Head of the Office of Foreign Missions (with the rank of ambassador) | Rebecca E. Gonzales | May 31, 2022 (Confirmed May 19, 2022, by voice vote) | January 20, 2025 |
| — Head of the Office of Sanctions Coordination (with the rank of ambassador) | James C. O'Brien | April 14, 2022 (Confirmed April 6, 2022, 71–26) | October 5, 2023 |
| — Special Envoy to Monitor and Combat Anti-Semitism (with the rank of ambassador) | Deborah Lipstadt | May 3, 2022 (Confirmed March 30, 2022, by voice vote) | January 20, 2025 |
| — Special Envoy on North Korean Human Rights Issues (with the rank of ambassador) | Julie Turner | October 13, 2023 (Confirmed July 27, 2023 by voice vote) | January 23, 2025 |
| — Special Representative of the President for Nuclear Nonproliferation (with the rank of ambassador) | Adam M. Scheinman | December 20, 2021 (Confirmed December 18, 2021, by voice vote) | January 20, 2025 |

== Withdrawn nominations ==
| Office | Nominee | Announced | Withdrawn | Notes |
|---|---|---|---|---|
| — Ambassador to Brunei Darussalam | Angela Kerwin | July 31, 2024 | January 3, 2025 | Nomination not resent |
| — Ambassador to Paraguay | Gabriel Escobar | July 23, 2024 | January 3, 2025 | Nomination not resent |
| — Ambassador to Benin | Kali C. Jones | July 11, 2024 | January 3, 2025 | Nomination not resent |
| — Ambassador to the Gambia | Stephanie A. Miley | July 11, 2024 | January 3, 2025 | Nomination not resent |
| — Ambassador to Guinea | Melanie Anne Zimmerman | July 11, 2024 | January 3, 2025 | Nomination not resent |
| — Ambassador to Bosnia and Herzegovina | Douglas D. Jones | July 11, 2024 | January 3, 2025 | Nomination not resent |
| — Ambassador to the Solomon Islands | Keith Hanigan | July 11, 2024 | January 3, 2025 | Nomination not resent |
| — Ambassador to Cameroon | Elizabeth Moore Aubin | June 13, 2024 | January 3, 2025 | Nomination not resent |
| — Ambassador to Kyrgyzstan | Brian Stimmler | June 13, 2024 | January 3, 2025 | Nomination not resent |
| — Ambassador to Bahrain | Stephanie Hallett | June 13, 2024 | January 3, 2025 | Nomination not resent |
| — Ambassador to Mozambique | James B. Story | June 5, 2024 | January 3, 2025 | Nomination not resent |
| — Ambassador to Vietnam | Kin W. Moy | June 5, 2024 | January 3, 2025 | Nomination not resent |
| — Ambassador to Malawi | Michael G. Heath | May 28, 2024 | January 3, 2025 | Nomination not resent |
| — Ambassador to Norway | Mark Angelson | May 28, 2024 | January 3, 2025 | Nomination not resent |
| — Ambassador to the Central African Republic | Christopher Lamora | May 9, 2024 | January 3, 2025 | Nomination not resent |
| — Ambassador to Bangladesh | David Meale | May 9, 2024 | January 3, 2025 | Nomination not resent |
| — Ambassador to Angola; Ambassador to São Tomé and Príncipe | Abigail L. Dressel | May 2, 2024 | January 3, 2025 | Nomination not resent |
| — Ambassador to Samoa | James Holtsnider | May 2, 2024 | January 3, 2025 | Nomination not resent |
| — Representative to the Organization for Security and Cooperation in Europe (with the rank of ambassador) | Curtis Ried | April 18, 2024 | January 3, 2025 | Nomination not resent |
| — Ambassador to Equatorial Guinea | Amanda S. Jacobsen | April 11, 2024 | January 3, 2025 | Nomination not resent |
| — Ambassador to Mauritania | Christophe Tocco | April 11, 2024 | January 3, 2025 | Nomination not resent |
| — Ambassador to Lesotho | Jeremey Neitzke | March 14, 2024 | January 3, 2025 | Nomination not resent |
| — Ambassador to Senegal; Ambassador to Guinea-Bissau | Peter W. Lord | March 14, 2024 | January 3, 2025 | Nomination not resent |
| — Ambassador to Moldova | Kelly Adams-Smith | March 14, 2024 | January 3, 2025 | Nomination not resent |
| — Ambassador to Algeria | Joshua M. Harris | February 29, 2024 | January 3, 2025 | Nomination not resent |
| — Ambassador to Seychelles | Troy D. Fitrell | February 29, 2024 | January 3, 2025 | Nomination not resent |
| — Ambassador to Togo | Mary Daschbach | February 29, 2024 | January 3, 2025 | Nomination not resent |
| — Ambassador to Sri Lanka | Elizabeth K. Horst | February 29, 2024 | January 3, 2025 | Nomination not resent |
| — Ambassador to Iraq | Tracey Ann Jacobson | January 25, 2024 | January 3, 2025 | Nomination not resent |
| — Deputy United States Trade Representative for Western Hemisphere, Europe, the Middle East, Labor, and Environment (with the rank of ambassador) | Nelson Cunningham | January 11, 2024 | May 23, 2024 | |
| — Ambassador to Libya | Jennifer Gavito | January 8, 2024 | November 14, 2024 | |
| — Ambassador to the Dominican Republic | Juan Carlos Iturregui | November 30, 2023 | January 3, 2025 | Nomination not resent |
| — Ambassador to Eswatini (Swaziland) | John W. McIntyre | October 20, 2023 | January 3, 2025 | Nomination not resent |
| — Ambassador-at-Large for Global Health Security and Diplomacy | John Nkengasong | September 28, 2023 | January 3, 2025 | Nomination not resent |
| — Head of the Office of Sanctions Coordination (with the rank of ambassador) | Erik Woodhouse | September 5, 2023 | July 11, 2024 | |
| — Representative on the Council of the International Civil Aviation Organization (with the rank of ambassador) | Charlie Crist | June 7, 2023 | January 3, 2025 | Nomination not resent |
| — Ambassador to Albania | David J. Kostelancik | January 23, 2023 | January 3, 2025 | Nomination not resent |
| — Ambassador to Colombia | Jean Elizabeth Manes | January 3, 2023 | January 3, 2024 | Nomination not resent |
| — Ambassador to Montenegro | B. Bix Aliu | September 16, 2022 | January 3, 2025 | Nomination not resent |
| — Ambassador to Cambodia | Robert W. Forden | June 22, 2022 | January 3, 2025 | Nomination not resent |
| — Ambassador to the Bahamas | Calvin Smyre | May 13, 2022 | January 3, 2025 | Nomination not resent |
| — Ambassador to the Dominican Republic | Calvin Smyre | September 22, 2021 | May 17, 2022 | Renominated to be the ambassador to the Bahamas |
| — Chief Agricultural Negotiator of the Office of the United States Trade Representative (with the rank of ambassador) | Elaine Trevino | September 13, 2021 | March 21, 2022 | |
| — Chief Innovation and Intellectual Property Negotiator of the Office of the United States Trade Representative (with the rank of ambassador) | Christopher Wilson | August 10, 2021 | January 3, 2023 | Nomination not resent |

== See also ==
- List of political appointments by Joe Biden
- Cabinet of Joe Biden
- List of federal judges appointed by Joe Biden
- List of Department of State appointments by Joe Biden
- List of ambassadors appointed by Donald Trump (disambiguation)

== Notes ==
Confirmation votes

Confirmations by roll call vote

Confirmations by voice vote
