= South Sudan–United States relations =

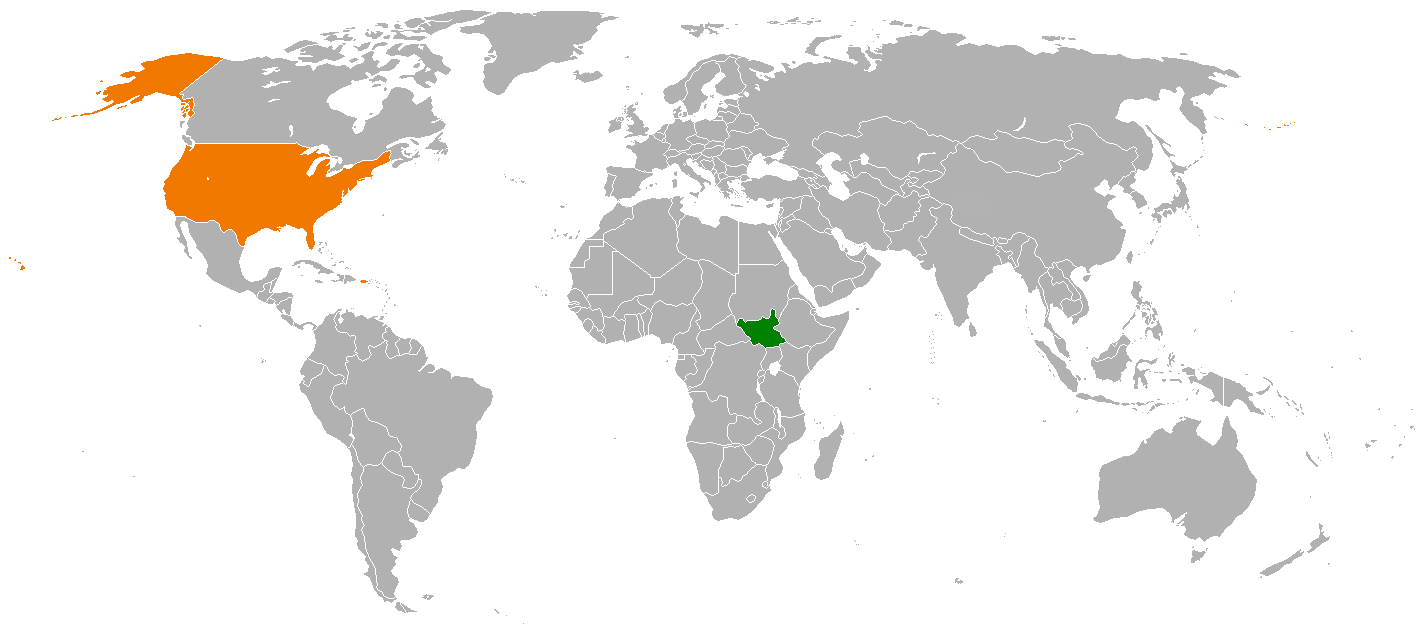

- South Sudan: United States

Diplomatic mission
- South Sudanese Embassy, Washington, D.C.: United States Embassy, Juba

South Sudan–United States relations are the bilateral relations between the Republic of South Sudan and the United States of America.

== History ==
=== Obama Administration, 2011–2017 ===
The United States officially recognized South Sudan on 9 July 2011, the same day they declared independence.

The United States Embassy in Juba, South Sudan, was first established on the same day with the former consulate that had been opened in 2005 in Juba being upgraded to the status of an embassy. The chief of mission was Chargé d'Affaires R. Barrie Walkley, pending the appointment of an ambassador to South Sudan. On 19 October 2011, Susan D. Page was confirmed as the first United States ambassador to South Sudan.

In 2012, United States President Barack Obama found that the United States could provide military assistance and equipment to South Sudan. This was soon followed by a team of five American officers to advise the South Sudanese military. Obama named Donald E. Booth as his special envoy for Sudan and South Sudan on 28 August 2013.

In December 2016, USA drafted a resolution, that failed to pass, which would have implemented an arms embargo and more sanctions, due to signs in South Sudan of possible genocide. UN alliterated this by warning South Sudan of possible genocide. In 2017, the USA's UN ambassador, Nikki Haley, criticized South Sudan for creating a "man made" famine.

=== First Trump Administration, 2017–2021 ===
While South Sudan has not been its own sovereign country for a long time, President Salva Kiir has established rapport with the United States. Then-U.S. President Barack Obama recognized South Sudan the day it declared independence from Sudan, and U.S. President Donald Trump fostered relations with Kiir even before he won the presidency in 2016. While relations between the two countries have changed from support to subtle threats recently, the United States has been open about both the right to self-determination and insistence that humanitarian aid to South Sudanese affected by the civil war reach its victims.

In August 2016, when Donald Trump was campaigning for the United States presidency, the South Sudanese government led an attack on Western aid workers, which included American humanitarians. Following this attack, the U.S. and other countries in the U.N. Security Council moved to provide “4,000 more U.N. helmets to secure the capital.” While Donald Trump has shifted views on leadership and the status quo in South Sudan many times, the Obama administration was key to the self-determination of the South Sudanese people.

In November 2016, when Donald Trump became President of the United States, many nations did not welcome the change. South Sudan, on the other hand, was pleased. At the time, South Sudan had dealt with almost three years of civil war and viewed Trump's victory as a new and possible way to end the conflict. New U.S. policies on South Sudan were something that Tor Deng Mawien, a South Sudanese presidential advisor on decentralization affairs, was “looking forward” to. In March 2016, before Trump had won the election, South Sudanese leader Salva Kiir called Trump to wish him success, saying that if he was elected the two countries would work closely to gain back the mutual trust lost when Barack Obama was president. While Kiir congratulated Trump on his victory, U.S. ambassador to South Sudan stated that, “there is no expectation that the United States government will change its foreign policy in South Sudan despite the election of Trump. Many South Sudanese supported Trump, believing that his presidency would result in Trump working towards a solution to end the civil war rather than its own interests. However, many South Sudanese viewed Obama’s presidency as “lukewarm” and “doing either no good or bad to the people of South Sudan.” The South Sudanese are “already in despair, so all we can hope for is a positive response from Trump.”

In October 2017, US Ambassador to the United Nations Nikki Haley was the first senior member of Donald Trump's first administration to visit South Sudan. At this point, South Sudan had been in a civil war for around four years, and according to Haley, “The United States was at a crossroads and that every decision going forward was going to be based on [South Sudanese President Salva Kiir’s] actions.” Haley also expressed that Americans were disappointed in Kiir's leadership in South Sudan. In addition to pressure from the U.S., the United Nations alleged ethnic cleansing on behalf of Kiir's government and a “fertile ground” for genocide, which Kiir's government denied. Trump imposed sanctions on three South Sudanese in September 2017 and expressed that the way to regain trust of the government is through providing care for affected citizens. The U.S. demanded that Kiir let “full and consistent humanitarian aid access” into the country, as well as an unspecified timeline of Kiir's actions, to further positive relations between the two countries.

In December 2018, Donald Trump officiated a highly controversial relocation of the United States Embassy in Israel, moving it from Tel Aviv to Jerusalem. Following the decision, a foreign newspaper published a report saying that South Sudan “lauded” (strongly supported) the decision. In addition, it was said that a South Sudanese embassy had congratulated both Trump and Israeli Prime Minister Benjamin Netanyahu on the decision, and a high-ranking South Sudanese presidential aide had spoken to the newspaper supporting Trump's decision. However, an official statement said otherwise. According to the South Sudan Presidential Press Unit, the government “will not make any specific statement or take any position on the decision of President Trump.” The government also views the newspaper that published the report as “fabricated and absolutely false.” South Sudan also expressed that their main priority is to find an inclusive solution to their country's conflict, not the affairs of other countries.

In December 2018, Donald Trump proposed a new Africa strategy, being very specific on South Sudan. The country ended a violent five-year-long civil war in October after President Salva Kiir signed a peace deal with his enemy Riek Machar in an attempt to provide lasting peace. The United States had given millions of dollars to South Sudan either in aid or from the sale of oil, a move that Trump reviewed to make sure that “our aid does not prolong the conflict or facilitate predatory behavior,” said his National Security Advisor John Bolton. Bolton called the South Sudanese government “led by the same morally bankrupt leaders, who perpetuate the horrific violence in immense human suffering in South Sudan.” He said that countries that receive money from the U.S. must invest in beneficial programs such as health and education, and promote fiscal transparency and the rule of law. Countries must also not commit “gross human rights abuses” and in general protect the welfare of their citizens. Previously, the South Sudanese government had dismissed or even disregarded sanctions against government officials and money laundering. In response to this and South Sudan's indifferent neighbors, Trump threatened to blacklist financial institutions that ignored sanctions, and sent another official sanction to South Sudan. Fiscally, these dealings are connected to China, a sore spot for Trump. The US proposed a “Prosper Africa” policy where Trump will try to motivate leaders to choose “high-quality, transparent, inclusive, and sustainable foreign investment projects, including those from the United States”. Contrastingly, Trump believes that China gains financially from corrupt regimes in the region, furthering their feud. Historically, South Sudan seems to ignore international criticism and sanctions, much to the dismay of Trump and other leaders worldwide.

=== Second Trump Administration (2025–present) ===
On 5 April 2025, United States Secretary of State Marco Rubio and Deputy Secretary of State Christopher Landau announced that the United States would be revoking the visas of all South Sudanese citizens in the United States and barring entry to all South Sudanese citizens following a dispute around the repatriation of a South Sudanese citizen. Rubio stated that the US government would consider reviewing these actions in return for securing South Sudanese cooperation in accepting repatriated nationals. The Obama Administration had granted "temporary protected status" to South Sudanese citizens in the United States in 2011 in response to the independence conflict with Sudan.

On 23 May 2025, United States district judge Brian E. Murphy blocked the Trump Administration from deporting eight men from Myanmar, Cuba, Vietnam, Laos, Mexico and South Sudan to South Sudan. The host countries had declined to accept these men. The Trump Administration had issued orders to deport the men to South Sudan despite a State Department travel advisory warning against travel due to instability and threats to safety.

In December 2025, the Bureau of African Affairs released a statement entitled, "Time to Stop Taking Advantage of the United States," accusing South Sudan of imposing excessively high fees on humanitarian groups and obstructing their operations. The department stated that these actions were "violations of South Sudan's international obligations" and threatened to cut off foreign aid to the country.

== Diplomatic representation ==
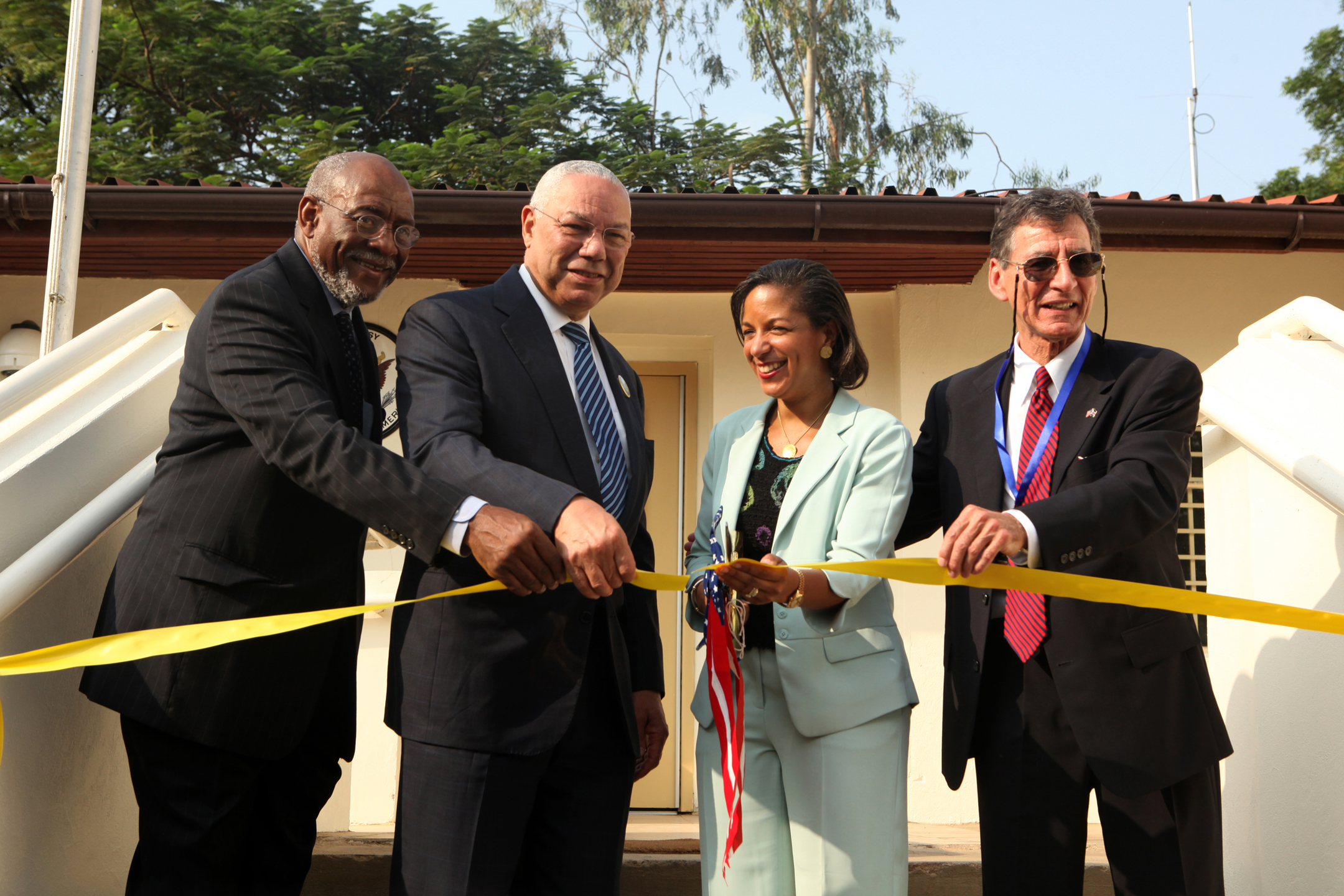
Embassy of the United States in Juba.

The U.S. Embassy in South Sudan is located in Juba. Michael J. Adler has served as United States Ambassador to South Sudan since 2022.

South Sudan maintains a diplomatic mission in Washington, D.C.
