= Steven Koutsis =

American diplomat

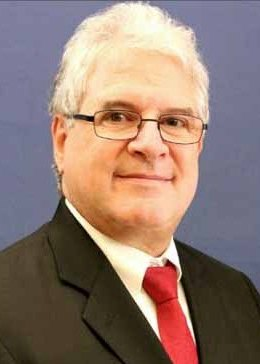

Chargé d’Affaires of Guinea
- In office September 2020 – January 19, 2022
- President: Donald Trump; Joe Biden
- Preceded by: Simon Henshaw

Chargé d’Affaires of Sudan
- In office July 7, 2016 – September 10, 2019
- President: Barack Obama; Donald Trump
- Preceded by: Jerry P. Lanier (Chargé d'affaires)
- Succeeded by: Brian W. Shukan (Chargé d'affaires)

Personal details
- Education: Boston University (BA)

Steven Christopher Koutsis is an American diplomat who served as the Chargé d’Affaires of Guinea between 2020 and 2022. He was a former nominee to be the United States Ambassador to Chad.

== Early life and education ==
Koutsis earned a Bachelor of Arts from Boston University in 1979.

== Career ==
Koutsis is a career member of the Senior Foreign Service, class of Minister Counselor. His diplomatic career has involve roles as the Director of the Office of the Special Envoy for Sudan and South Sudan, Deputy Chief of Mission in Ouagadougou, Burkina Faso, and Deputy Director in the Office of Central African Affairs. Prior assignments include service as Team Leader of the Provincial Reconstruction Team in Diyala Province, Iraq, Political and Economic Counselor in Monrovia, Liberia, and Deputy Chief of Mission in Nouakchott, Mauritania. Most recently, from 2016 to 2019, he served as the Charge d’Affaires of the United States Embassy in Khartoum, Sudan. Koutsis became Chargé d’Affaires for Guinea in September 2020.

On July 24, 2019, he was nominated to be the next United States Ambassador to Chad. On August 1, 2020, his nomination was sent to the Senate. On January 3, 2021, his nomination was returned to the President under Rule XXXI, Paragraph 6 of the United States Senate.

== Personal life ==
Koutsis speaks French and Arabic.
