= Assistant Secretary of State for African Affairs =

U.S. government position

United States Assistant Secretary of State for African Affairs
- Seal of the United States Department of State

- Flag of an assistant secretary of state

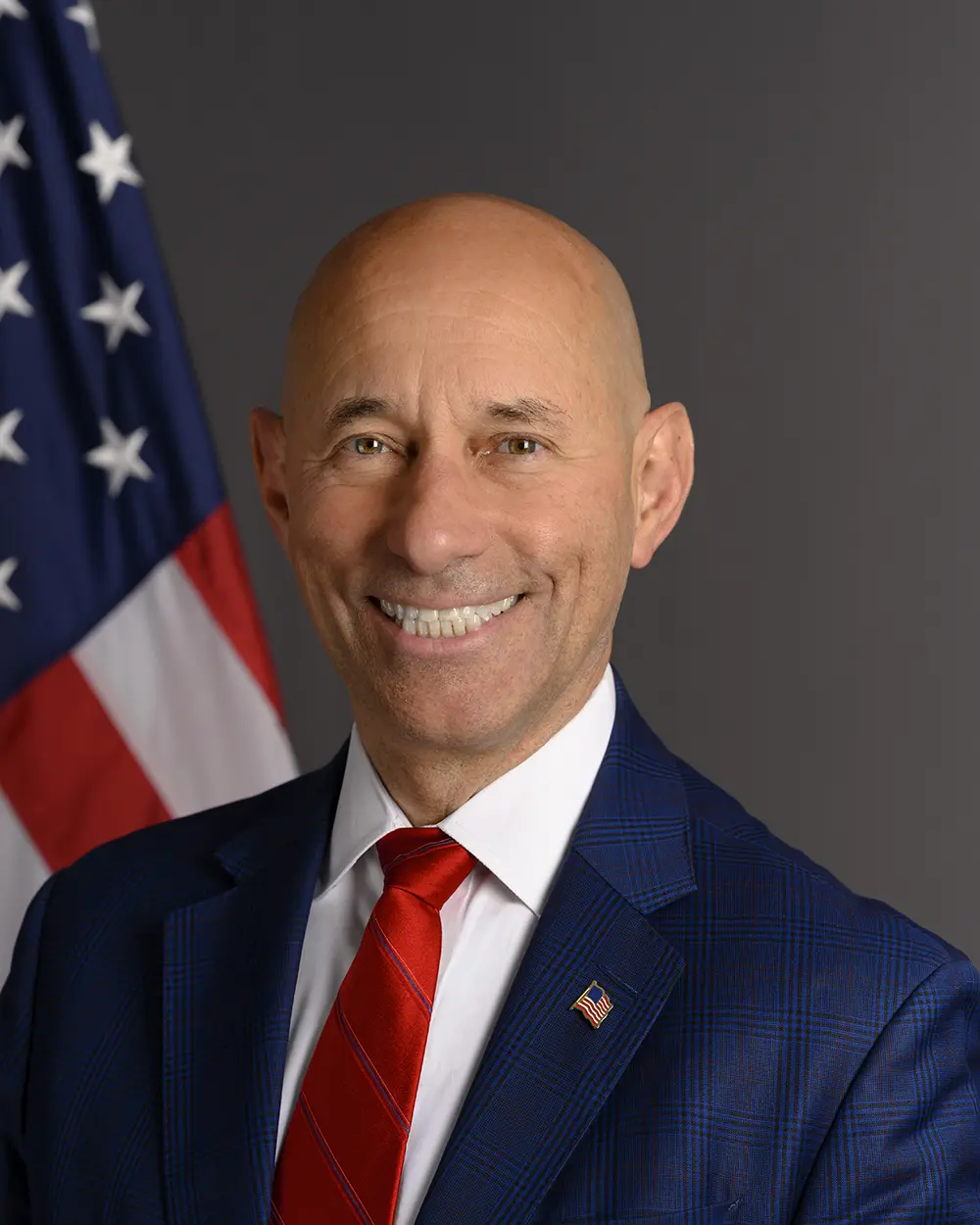
- Incumbent; Frank Garcia since June 1, 2026
- Reports to: Under Secretary of State for Political Affairs
- Nominator: President of the United States
- Inaugural holder: Joseph C. Satterthwaite
- Formation: September 1958
- Website: Official Website

The assistant secretary of state for African affairs is the head of the Bureau of African Affairs, within the United States Department of State, who guides operation of the U.S. diplomatic establishment in the countries of sub-Saharan Africa and advises the Secretary of State and the Under Secretary for Political Affairs.

On July 18, 1958, Congress authorized an 11th assistant secretary of state, enabling the Department of State to create a bureau to deal with relations with the newly independent nations of Africa. At first, when the Department of State established three geographical divisions in 1909, African affairs were the responsibility of the Divisions of Near Eastern and Western European Affairs. Department Order No. 692 of June 15, 1937, transferred responsibility for all African territories except Algeria and the Union of South Africa to the Division of Near Eastern Affairs. A Division of African Affairs was created in the office of Near Eastern Affairs in January 1944. When the Bureau of Near Eastern, South Asian, and African Affairs was created, there continued to be a Division of African Affairs within that bureau.

== List of assistant secretaries of state for African affairs ==
#	Portrait	Name	Assumed office	Left office	President served under
1		Joseph C. Satterthwaite	September 2, 1958	January 31, 1961	Dwight D. Eisenhower and John F. Kennedy
2		G. Mennen Williams	February 1, 1961	March 23, 1966	John F. Kennedy and Lyndon B. Johnson
3		Joseph Palmer II	April 11, 1966	July 7, 1969	Lyndon B. Johnson
4		David D. Newsom	July 17, 1969	January 13, 1974	Richard Nixon
5		Donald B. Easum	March 18, 1974	March 26, 1975	Richard Nixon and Gerald Ford
6		Nathaniel Davis	April 2, 1975	July 19, 1975	Gerald Ford
7		William E. Schaufele, Jr.	December 19, 1975	July 17, 1977	Gerald Ford and Jimmy Carter
8		Richard M. Moose	July 6, 1977	January 16, 1981	Jimmy Carter
9		Chester Crocker	June 9, 1981	April 21, 1989	Ronald Reagan and George H. W. Bush
10		Herman Jay Cohen	May 12, 1989	February 26, 1993	George H. W. Bush and Bill Clinton
11		George Moose	April 2, 1993	August 22, 1997	Bill Clinton
12		Susan E. Rice	October 9, 1997	January 20, 2001	Bill Clinton
-		Nancy Jo Powell (Acting)	January 21, 2001	June 3, 2001	George W. Bush
13		Walter H. Kansteiner, III	June 4, 2001	November 1, 2003	George W. Bush
-		Charles R. Snyder (Acting)	November 1, 2003	July 24, 2004	George W. Bush
14		Constance Berry Newman	July 24, 2004	August 26, 2005	George W. Bush
15		Jendayi Frazer	August 29, 2005	January 20, 2009	George W. Bush
-		Philip Carter (Acting)	January 20, 2009	May 7, 2009	Barack Obama
16		Johnnie Carson	May 7, 2009	March 30, 2013	Barack Obama
-		Donald Yamamoto (Acting)	March 30, 2013	August 5, 2013	Barack Obama
17		Linda Thomas-Greenfield	August 6, 2013	March 10, 2017	Barack Obama and Donald Trump
-		Donald Yamamoto (Acting)	September 5, 2017	July 22, 2018	Donald Trump
18		Tibor P. Nagy, Jr.	July 23, 2018	January 20, 2021	Donald Trump
-		Robert F. Godec (Acting)	January 20, 2021	September 30, 2021	Joe Biden
19		Mary Catherine Phee	September 30, 2021	January 20, 2025	Joe Biden
-		Troy Fitrell (Acting)	January 20, 2025	July 16, 2025	Donald Trump
-		Jonathan Pratt (Acting)	July 16, 2025	January 6, 2026	Donald Trump
-		Nick Checker (Acting)	January 6, 2026	June 1, 2026	Donald Trump
20		Frank Garcia	June 1, 2026	Present	Donald Trump
