= Phillip Carter (ambassador) =

American diplomat

Phillip Carter III
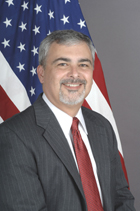

United States Ambassador to Ivory Coast
- In office September 24, 2010 – August 27, 2013
- President: Barack Obama
- Preceded by: Wanda Nesbitt
- Succeeded by: Terence McCulley

United States Ambassador to Guinea
- In office November 7, 2007 – August 19, 2008
- President: George W. Bush
- Preceded by: Jackson McDonald
- Succeeded by: Patricia Moller

Personal details
- Born: 1959 (age 66–67)
- Spouse: Amanda Carter
- Education: Drew University; Yale University

Phillip Carter III (born 1959) is a Senior Foreign Service American diplomat and was United States Ambassador to Ivory Coast from 2010 to 2013. Carter holds the diplomatic rank of Minister Counselor. As of November, 2013 he is Deputy to the Commander for Civil Military Engagements, United States Africa Command (AFRICOM) in Stuttgart, Germany.

== Diplomatic service ==
Prior to his appointment as U.S. Ambassador to the Republic of Ivory Coast, Carter served as a Senior Advisor to the Africa Bureau and previously as Principal Deputy Assistant Secretary from 2008 to 2010. He was also the Africa Bureau’s Acting Assistant Secretary during the transition between the Bush and Obama Administrations. From 2007 to 2008, Carter was the U.S. Ambassador to Guinea. Carter has also served as the Director for West African Affairs and the Deputy Director in the Office for East African Affairs at the U.S. State Department.

Prior to that assignment, he was the Deputy Chief of Mission (DCM) at the U.S. Embassy in Antananarivo, Madagascar and DCM in Libreville, Gabon. Before his arrival in Gabon in 1997, he was an international financial economist in the State Department's Office of Monetary Affairs in the Bureau of Economic and Business Affairs. During this period, he dealt with international debt and capital matters and served as the Department's point-person on International Monetary Fund issues with Africa. From 1992-1994, he served as the Economic and Commercial Counselor at the U.S. Embassy in Dhaka, Bangladesh.

== Education ==
Carter received a Bachelor of Arts degree in economics and history from Drew University in 1980, and a Master of Arts Degree in International and Development Economics from Yale University in 1995.

Diplomatic posts
Preceded by Jackson McDonald	United States Ambassador to Guinea; 2007–2008	Succeeded by Patricia Moller
Preceded by Wanda Nesbitt	United States Ambassador to Ivory Coast; 2010–2013	Succeeded by Terence McCulley
