= Robert F. Godec =

American diplomat (born 1956)

Robert Frank Godec
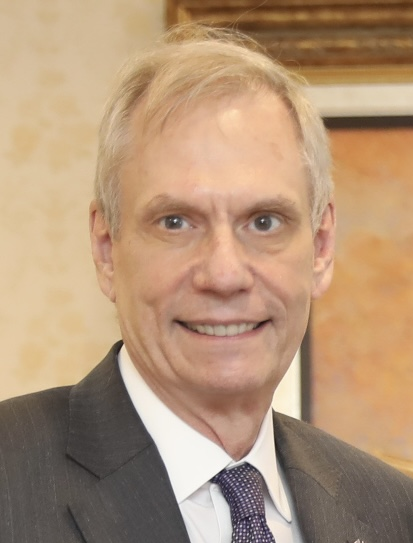

United States Ambassador to Thailand
- In office October 7, 2022 – December 1, 2025
- President: Joe Biden; Donald Trump
- Preceded by: Michael G. DeSombre
- Succeeded by: Sean O'Neill

Assistant Secretary of State for African Affairs
- Acting
- In office January 20, 2021 – September 30, 2021
- President: Joe Biden
- Preceded by: Tibor P. Nagy Jr.
- Succeeded by: Mary Catherine Phee

United States Ambassador to Kenya
- In office February 15, 2013 – February 1, 2019
- President: Barack Obama; Donald Trump
- Preceded by: Scott Gration
- Succeeded by: Kyle McCarter

United States Ambassador to Tunisia
- In office January 17, 2007 – July 29, 2009
- President: George W. Bush; Barack Obama
- Preceded by: William J. Hudson
- Succeeded by: Gordon Gray III

Personal details
- Born: 1956 (age 69–70) Rantoul, Illinois, U.S.
- Spouse: Lori G. Magnusson
- Education: University of Virginia (BA); Yale University (MA)

Robert Frank Godec (born 1956) is an American diplomat who served as the United States ambassador to Thailand from October 2022 to November 2025. He formerly served as the United States ambassador to Kenya from 2013 to 2019 and the United States ambassador to Tunisia from 2006 to 2009. He also served as acting assistant secretary for the Bureau of African Affairs from January to September 2021.

== Early life and education ==
Godec was born in Rantoul, Illinois, in 1956. He earned a Bachelor of Arts in foreign affairs from the University of Virginia in 1979 and a Master of Arts in international relations from Yale University.

== Career ==
Godec is a career member of the Senior Foreign Service with the rank of career minister; He has served in the service since 1985. He serves as senior coordinator for Afghanistan in the Bureau of Population, Refugees, and Migration at the U.S. Department of State. Previously, he was acting assistant secretary of state for the Bureau of African Affairs. He also served as principal deputy assistant secretary and as deputy assistant secretary in the Bureau of African Affairs. Earlier, Godec was deputy commandant and international affairs advisor at the National War College. Godec also served as principal deputy coordinator for counterterrorism in the Bureau of Counterterrorism in the Department of State. Godec has also served as deputy assistant secretary of state in the Bureau of Near Eastern Affairs and was deputy coordinator for the transition in Iraq. He served as acting deputy chief of mission and minister counselor for Economic Affairs in the U.S. embassy in Pretoria, South Africa. His other positions include economic counselor at U.S. embassy in Nairobi, Kenya; assistant office director for Thailand and Burma in the Bureau of East Asian and Pacific Affairs; and director for southeast asian affairs at the Office of the U.S. Trade Representative.

=== United States ambassador to Tunisia ===
Godec had previously served as United States ambassador to Tunisia. In December 2010 a number of leaked diplomatic cables written by Godec from Tunisia in 2008 and 2009 were published by Al Akhbar in Beirut. Many of them were highly critical of the public and personal life of the Tunisian president, Zine el Abidine Ben Ali, and his family. Godec mentioned high-level corruption, a "sclerotic" regime, and deep dislike or even hatred for the president's wife, Leila Trabelsi, and her family. There were later suggestions in the press that his comments could have fuelled the Tunisian Revolution, which began in December 2010 and led to the flight of Ben Ali to Saudi Arabia in January 2011.

=== United States ambassador to Kenya ===
Godec was United States ambassador to Kenya from 2013 to 2019. He was also Chargé d’Affaires a.i. at U.S. Embassy Nairobi, Kenya in 2012.

=== United States ambassador to Thailand ===
On April 1, 2022, President Joe Biden nominated Godec to be the United States ambassador to Thailand. Hearings on his nomination were held before the Senate Foreign Relations Committee on July 13, 2022. The committee favorably reported his nomination to the Senate floor on August 3, 2022. He was confirmed by the Senate via voice vote on August 4, 2022. Godec presented his credentials to King Vajiralongkorn on October 7, 2022.

== Awards and recognitions ==
Godec has won two Presidential Meritorious Service Awards, numerous Senior Performance Awards, and a Distinguished Honor Award.

== Personal life ==
Since 1986, Godec has been married to Lori G. Magnusson. He speaks French and German.

Diplomatic posts
Preceded by William J. Hudson	United States Ambassador to Tunisia; 2006–2009	Succeeded by Gordon Gray III
Preceded by Scott Gration	United States Ambassador to Kenya; 2013–2019	Succeeded by Kyle McCarter
Preceded by Michael G. DeSombre	United States Ambassador to Thailand; 2022–present	Incumbent
Political offices
Preceded by Tibor P. Nagy Jr.	United States Assistant Secretary of State for African Affairs; 2021	Succeeded by Mary Catherine Phee
