= Troy D. Fitrell =

American diplomat

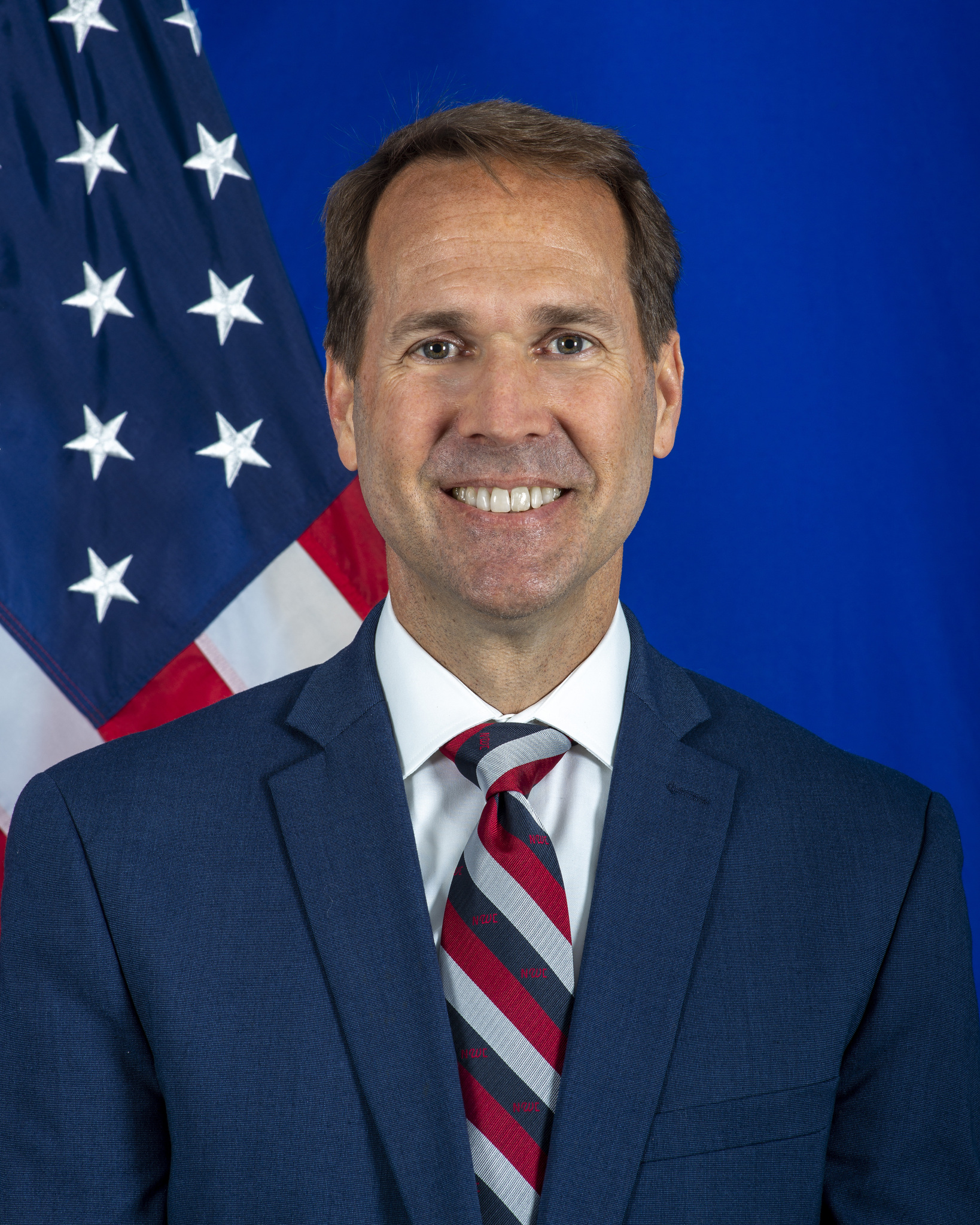
- Fitrell in 2022

United States Ambassador to Guinea
- In office January 19, 2022 – January 20, 2025
- President: Joe Biden; Donald Trump
- Preceded by: Simon Henshaw

Chargé d'Affaires of Mauritius and Chargé d'Affaires of Seychelles
- In office February 2011 – November 2012
- President: Barack Obama
- Preceded by: Mary Jo Wills
- Succeeded by: Shari Villarosa

Personal details
- Education: University of Maryland (BA); National War College (MS)

Troy Damian Fitrell is an American diplomat who had served as the United States ambassador to Guinea.

Fitrell was the head of the State Department’s African bureau until 2025.

== Early life and education ==
Fitrell earned a Bachelor of Arts at the University of Maryland and a Master of Science at the National War College.

== Career ==
Fitrell is a career member of the Senior Foreign Service, class of Minister Counselor. He has served as deputy chief of mission at the U.S. embassies in Ethiopia and Mauritius, as deputy director of the department’s Office of Southern African Affairs, and as deputy director of the Office of International Security Cooperation in the Bureau of Political-Military Affairs. He was senior advisor to the United States Special Envoy for the African Great Lakes, coordinating U.S. policy on the cross-border security, political, and economic issues in the Great Lakes region. Fitrell served as a Pearson Fellow on the staff of the House Foreign Affairs Committee and was a watch officer in the Department’s Nuclear Risk Reduction Center.

=== Ambassador to Guinea ===
On June 15, 2021, President Joe Biden nominated Fitrell to be the next United States Ambassador to Guinea. On August 5, 2021, a hearing on his nomination was held before the Senate Foreign Relations Committee. On October 19, 2021, his nomination was reported favorably out of committee. On December 18, 2021, the United States Senate confirmed his nomination by voice vote. He assumed office on January 19, 2022. He retired from the State Department in 2025.

== Personal life ==
Fitrell speaks French, Spanish, Portuguese, Swedish and Danish.

== See also ==
- Ambassadors of the United States

Diplomatic posts
Preceded by Steven Koutsis; Chargé d'Affaires	United States Ambassador to Guinea; 2022–2025	Vacant
