= Jackson McDonald =

American diplomat

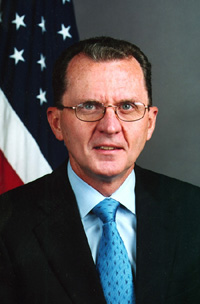
Jackson McDonald, U.S. Ambassador to Guinea

Jackson C. McDonald (born 1956) is a former United States diplomat and a career officer of the U.S. Foreign Service. He served as the Ambassador to Guinea 2004–2007. From 2001 to 2004, he served as U.S. Ambassador to the Republic of the Gambia.

McDonald studied at the Edmund A. Walsh School of Foreign Service at Georgetown University, the Institut d'études politiques in Paris (best known as Sciences Po), and the École nationale d'administration in Paris. He began his career in the U.S. Foreign Service in 1980 as third secretary and vice consul at the American embassy in Dhaka, Bangladesh. From 1982 to 1984, he served as country officer for Bangladesh at the U.S. Department of State. In 1984, he volunteered for duty at the American embassy in Beirut, Lebanon, where he served as second secretary for political affairs for two years.

After a year of Russian-language training, McDonald served as first secretary for political affairs at the American embassy in Moscow, the Soviet Union, from 1990 to 1991. In early 1992, he volunteered to open the American embassy in Almaty, Kazakhstan, where he served first as chargé d'affaires then as deputy chief of mission until 1994. From 1994 to 1997, McDonald served as consul general in Marseille, France, with dual accreditation to the Principality of Monaco.

After graduating from the U.S. Department of State's Senior Seminar in 1998, he was assigned as deputy chief of mission at the American embassy in Abidjan, Ivory Coast. In October 2001, he was sworn in as U.S. Ambassador to the Republic of the Gambia, a post he held until May 2004 before being appointed to his ambassadorial post in Guinea.

From 2007 to 2009, McDonald served as senior advisor for security negotiations and agreements at the U.S. Department of State in Washington. In that capacity, he served as the U.S. Government's chief negotiator for political-military agreements with foreign governments to support the stationing and deployment of U.S. military personnel overseas. From 2009 to 2010, he held the State Department Chair on the faculty of the National Defense Intelligence College, before being appointed as the first-ever foreign policy advisor to the Commander of U.S. Cyber Command.

In 2011, McDonald retired from the U.S. Foreign Service and pursued his lifelong interest in foreign affairs as a consultant. He is executive vice president of Jefferson Waterman International, an international political and business advisory firm in Washington, D.C.

McDonald speaks French and Russian. He has received the U.S. Department of State's Superior Honor Award six times as well as the Presidential Performance Award. He is an officer (honorary) in the National Order of the Republic of the Gambia.

McDonald was born in Florida.

Diplomatic posts
| Preceded by George Williford Boyce Haley | United States Ambassador to the Gambia; 2001–2004 | Succeeded by Joseph D. Stafford III |
| Preceded by R. Barrie Walkley | United States Ambassador to Guinea; 2007–2008 | Succeeded by Phillip Carter |
