= Tibor P. Nagy =

Hungarian-American diplomat (born 1949)

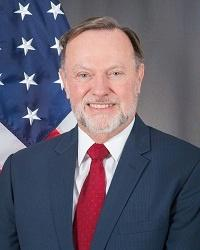
- Official portrait, 2018

Acting Under Secretary of State for Management
- In office January 20, 2025 – April 4, 2025
- President: Donald Trump
- Preceded by: John R. Bass
- Succeeded by: José Cunningham (Acting)

18th Assistant Secretary of State for African Affairs
- In office July 23, 2018 – January 20, 2021
- President: Donald Trump
- Preceded by: Linda Thomas-Greenfield
- Succeeded by: Mary Catherine Phee

United States Ambassador to Ethiopia
- In office August 9, 1999 – July 19, 2002
- President: Bill Clinton; George W. Bush
- Preceded by: David H. Shinn
- Succeeded by: Aurelia E. Brazeal

United States Ambassador to Guinea
- In office October 10, 1996 – July 25, 1999
- Appointed by: Bill Clinton
- Preceded by: Joseph A. Saloom
- Succeeded by: Joyce Ellen Leader

Personal details
- Born: Tibor Peter Nagy Jr. April 29, 1949 (age 77) Budapest, Hungary
- Spouse: Evan Jane Nagy
- Children: 3
- Education: Texas Tech University (AB); George Washington University (MSA)
- Occupation: Diplomat
- Awards: Meritorious Honor Award (5); Superior Honor Award (1)

Tibor Peter Nagy Jr. (born April 29, 1949) is a Hungarian-American diplomat. He is former United States Assistant Secretary of State for African Affairs, and a former American foreign service officer who served as the American ambassador to Guinea and to Ethiopia. He had as the acting Under Secretary of State for Management from January 20, 2025 to April 4, 2025.

== Early life and education ==
As a child, Nagy was forced to flee from Hungary and arrived in Washington, D.C. in 1957, which became his home. After retiring from the Foreign Service, Nagy served as Vice Provost for International Affairs at Texas Tech University, from which he graduated in 1972. He also received a master's degree from the George Washington University in 1978. Tibor entered the foreign service in 1978.

== Career ==
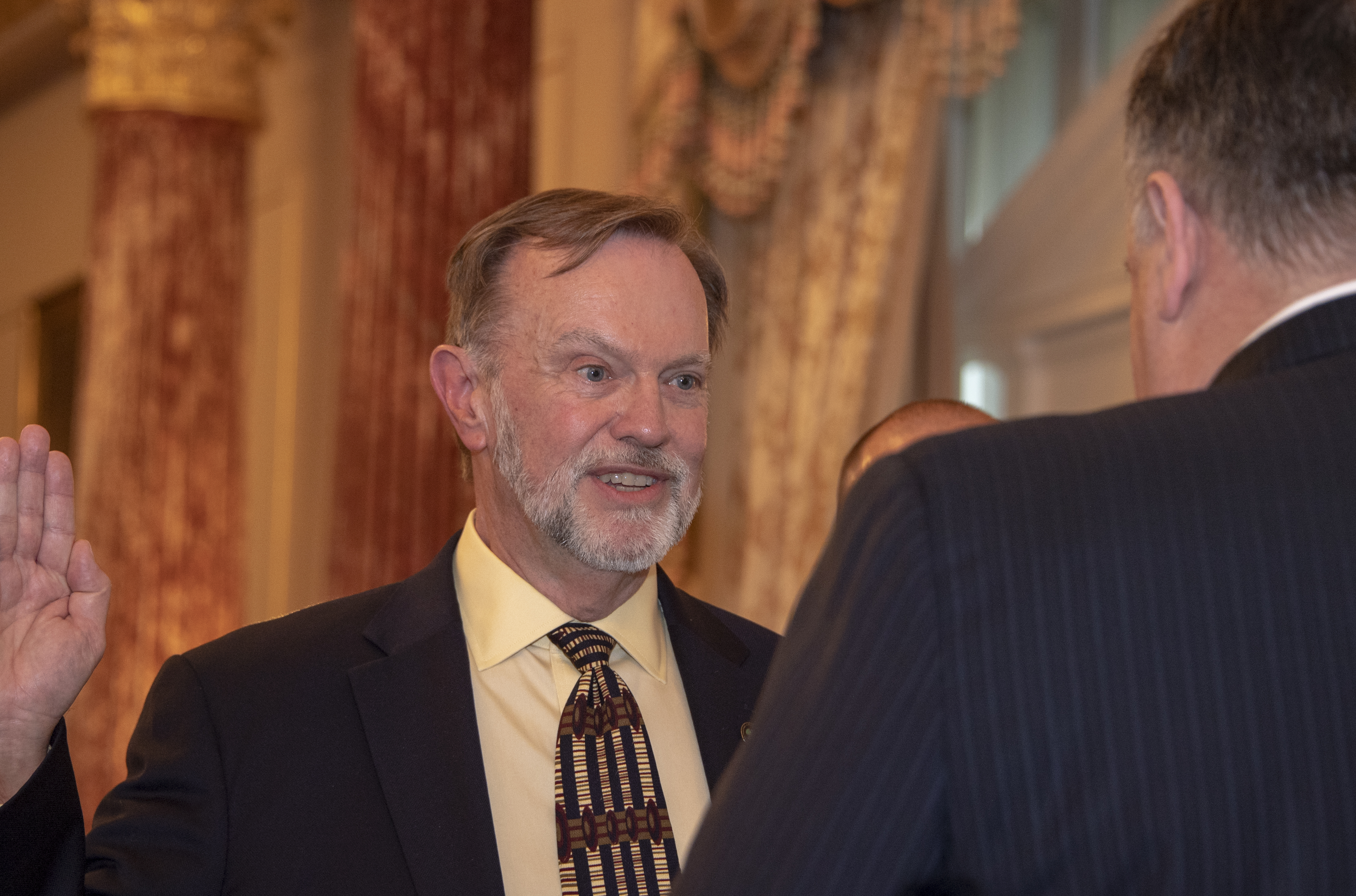
Nagy is sworn in by U.S. Secretary of State Michael R. Pompeo as Assistant Secretary of State for African Affairs at the Department of State on September 17, 2018.

Nagy is a retired career U.S. Foreign Service officer who followed through assignments as US Ambassador to Ethiopia and Guinea as well as the Deputy Chief of Mission in Nigeria, Cameroon and Togo. His earlier assignments included Zambia, the Seychelles, Ethiopia, and Washington, D.C.

Nagy was nominated to the position of Assistant Secretary of State for African Affairs by President Donald Trump on May 10, 2018. He testified before the U.S. Senate Foreign Relations Committee on June 14 and was confirmed by a voice vote of the full Senate on June 28. Nagy assumed office on July 23, 2018. He was succeeded by Robert F. Godec.

== Personal life ==
Nagy has been married to Jane since 1971. They have three adult children who were the first triplets born in the independent Zimbabwe.

== Publications ==
The 2014 Paris Book Festival awarded the winning prize in non-fiction to "Kiss Your Latte Goodbye: Managing Overseas Operations" which was co-authored by Nagy.

Diplomatic posts
Preceded by Joseph A. Saloom	United States Ambassador to Guinea; 1996–1999	Succeeded by Joyce Ellen Leader
Preceded by David H. Shinn	United States Ambassador to Ethiopia; 1999–2002	Succeeded by Aurelia E. Brazeal
Political offices
Preceded by Donald Yamamoto; Acting	United States Assistant Secretary of State for African Affairs; 2018–2021	Succeeded by Robert F. Godec; Acting
Preceded by John R. Bass	Under Secretary of State for Management; Acting; 2025–present	Incumbent
