= Joyce Ellen Leader =

American diplomat

Joyce Ellen Leader (born 1942) is a former American foreign service officer who served as the American ambassador to Guinea from 1999 to 2000. She succeeded Tibor P. Nagy and was succeeded by R. Barrie Walkley. She is a specialist in African and refugee affairs and is currently a visiting scholar at Georgetown University in the Edmund A. Walsh School of Foreign Service, and was formerly a Senior Fellow at The Fund for Peace, where she authored "Rwanda’s Struggle for Democracy and Peace, 1991–1994".

Diplomatic posts
Preceded by Tibor P. Nagy	United States Ambassador to Guinea; 1999–2000	Succeeded by R. Barrie Walkley
