= Mary Catherine Phee =

American diplomat (born 1963)

Molly Phee
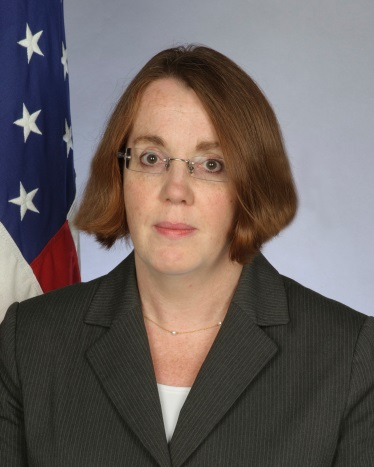

19th Assistant Secretary of State for African Affairs
- In office September 30, 2021 – January 20, 2025
- President: Joe Biden
- Preceded by: Tibor P. Nagy Jr.
- Succeeded by: Frank Garcia

Assistant Secretary of State for International Organization Affairs
- Acting
- In office December 12, 2017 – March 28, 2018
- President: Donald Trump
- Preceded by: Tracey Ann Jacobson
- Succeeded by: Kevin Moley

United States Ambassador to South Sudan
- In office July 23, 2015 – August 22, 2017
- President: Barack Obama; Donald Trump
- Preceded by: Susan Page
- Succeeded by: Thomas Hushek

Personal details
- Born: 1963 (age 62–63) Chicago, Illinois, U.S.
- Education: Indiana University, Bloomington (BA); Tufts University (MA)

Mary Catherine "Molly" Phee (born 1963) is an American diplomat who had served as assistant secretary of state for African affairs. She previously served as the U.S. ambassador to South Sudan from 2015 to 2017. She is a career member of the Senior Foreign Service with the rank of minister counselor.

== Early life and education ==
Phee is from Chicago. She was an undergraduate at Indiana University, where she earned a BA. She pursued graduate studies at the Fletcher School of Law and Diplomacy at Tufts University, earning an MA in law and diplomacy in 1989. As part of her graduate studies, she participated in an internship program with the United Nations Environment Programme that involved travel and study in Kenya.

== Career ==
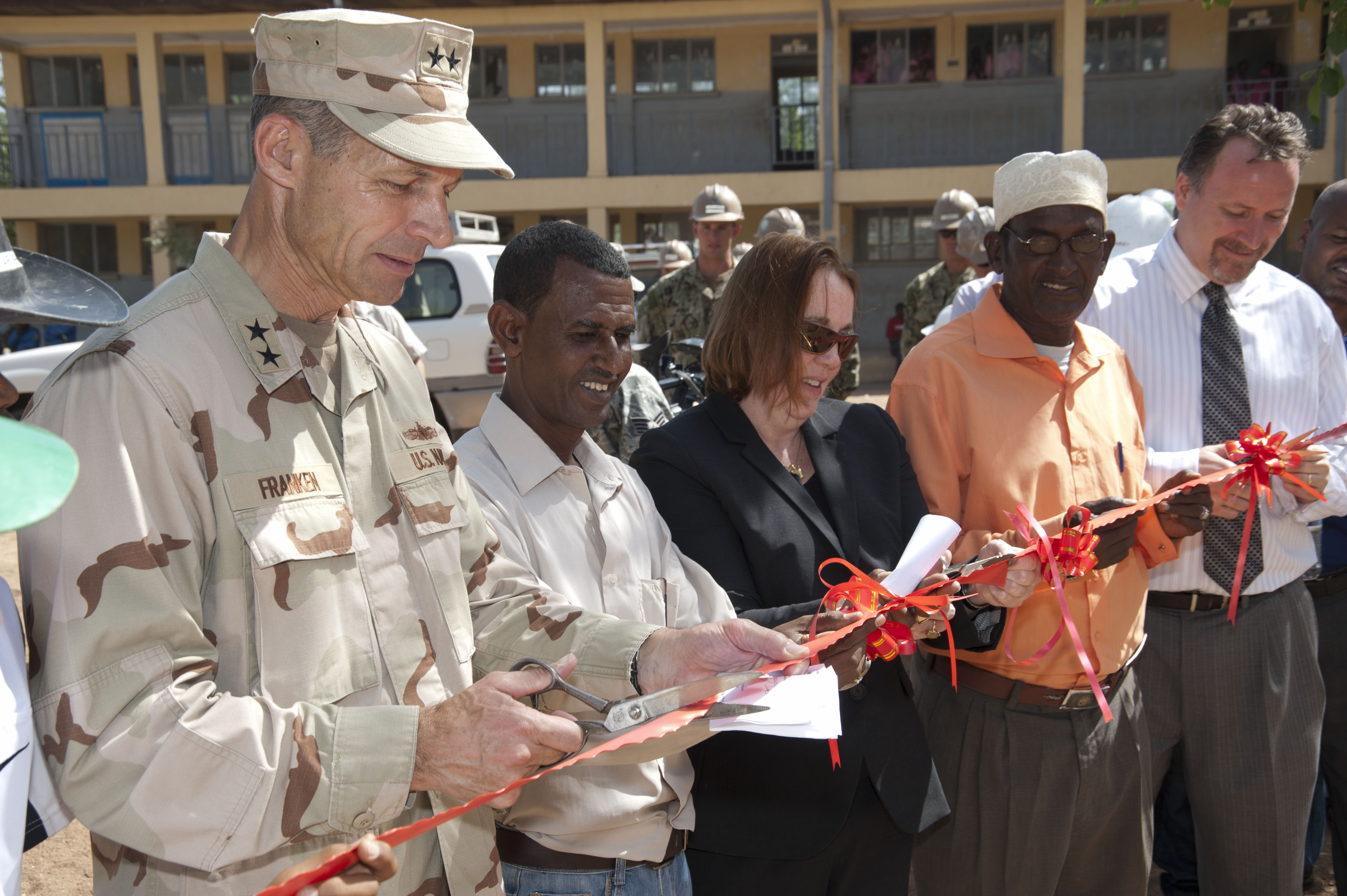
Molly Phee (center) at school building dedication and ribbon cutting ceremony.

Following her graduate studies, Phee became a deputy press secretary to Senator Daniel Patrick Moynihan. Phee joined the U.S. Foreign Service in 1991. Her assignments in the Foreign Service have included ones in Rome, Italy; Kuwait City, Kuwait; Cairo, Egypt; Amman, Jordan; and Washington, DC. From 2003 to 2004, Phee served as the senior civilian representative of the Coalition Provisional Authority to Maysan Province, Iraq In 2005, Phee moved to New York to serve as counselor for political affairs and deputy Security Council coordinator at the U.S. Mission to the United Nations, where on occasion sat in for then-Ambassador John R. Bolton. Ambassador Ryan Crocker and General David Petraeus invited Phee to join the Joint Strategic Assessment Team established in 2007 to revise the U.S. strategy in Iraq.

In 2008, Phee took an assignment in Italy as the regional affairs coordinator at the U.S. Embassy in Rome. From 2009 to 2011, Phee returned to Washington to serve as director for Iraq at the National Security Council. In that role she was responsible for coordinating the U.S. transition from military to civilian operations, culminating in the withdrawal of U.S. combat troops in December 2011. From 2011 to 2014, Phee served as deputy chief of mission at the U.S. Embassy in Addis Ababa, Ethiopia. When President Obama nominated her to become ambassador to South Sudan, she was already serving as chief of staff at the Office of the Special Envoy for Sudan and South Sudan.

=== Ambassador to South Sudan ===
On September 17, 2014, Phee was nominated to be U.S. ambassador to South Sudan by President Barack Obama. She was confirmed by the Senate on June 24, 2015, and sworn in on July 15, 2015, to replace Susan D. Page, who had resigned. She served from 2015 until 2017.

When the Senate Foreign Relations Committee did not immediately confirm Phee's nomination, several NGOs wrote to the committee urging it to quickly confirm the nomination, given the difficult situation in South Sudan. The organizations included Better World Campaign, The Enough Project, Humanity United, Jewish World Watch, International Rescue Committee, Mercy Corps, Oxfam America, Relief International, Save the Children, United to End Genocide, and Water for South Sudan. The NGOs protested that the U.S. had been without a confirmed ambassador to South Sudan since August 2014. They noted that the absence of an ambassador in a country involved in a "deadly, costly and geopolitically destabilizing civil war" had limited the U.S. ability to successfully promote peaceful resolution.

In accepting the role of ambassador in 2015, Phee was expected to oversee the relief effort of $456 million donated by the U.S. for over a million people displaced by the war, as well as revive the peace talks in Addis Ababa.

Ambassador Phee was then named as principal deputy assistant secretary of the Bureau of International Organization Affairs and served as acting assistant secretary until the appointment of Kevin Moley. Her assignment was curtailed by Moley, after which the U.S. Department of State Office of the Inspector General opened an investigation into allegations that the assistant secretary and other political appointees in the Bureau of International Organization Affairs used politicized and improper practices against career employees. Ambassador Phee then served as the deputy special representative for Afghanistan reconciliation.

=== Biden administration ===
==== State Department Nomination ====
On April 15, 2021, President Joe Biden nominated Phee to be the next assistant secretary of state for African affairs. The Senate Foreign Relations Committee held hearings on her nomination on July 20, 2021. The committee favorably reported her nomination to the Senate floor on August 4, 2021. On September 28, 2021, the U.S. Senate confirmed Phee as assistant secretary by a vote of 67–31. She was sworn in on September 30.

===== Tenure =====
On January 14, 2022, Phee announced that she would seek to help end the ongoing conflicts in Ethiopia with a visit to Saudi Arabia, Sudan, and Ethiopia.

==== African Development Foundation Nomination ====
Along with being nominated for a role in the State Department, Phee was nominated by President Biden to be a member of the board of directors of the African Development Foundation. Hearings were held on this nomination by the Senate Foreign Relations Committee on July 20, 2021. The committee favorably reported the nomination to the Senate floor on August 4, 2021. One of these nominations was withdrawn by President Biden on February 10, 2022, as the term for it had expired. Phee's nomination for a term ending in 2026 was resubmitted in January 2023 but expired a year later and was not resubmitted.

== Personal ==
In addition to English, Phee speaks Arabic, French and Italian.

Diplomatic posts
Preceded by Susan Page	United States Ambassador to South Sudan; 2015–2017	Succeeded by Thomas Hushek
Political offices
Preceded by Robert F. Godec	United States Assistant Secretary of State for African Affairs; 2021–2025	Succeeded by Frank Garcia
