= Michael J. Adler =

American diplomat

Michael Adler
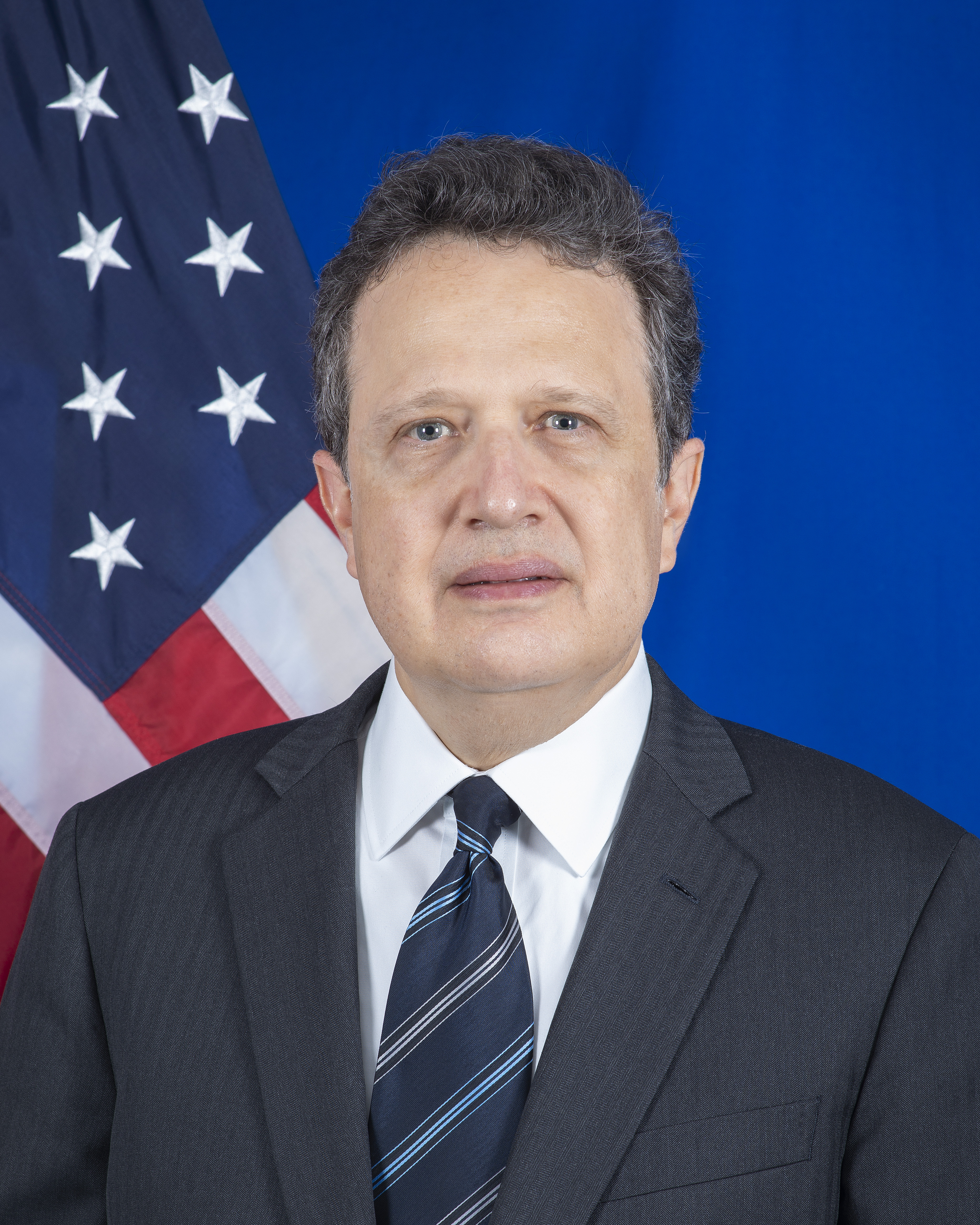

United States Ambassador to South Sudan
- Incumbent
- Assumed office August 24, 2022
- President: Joe Biden; Donald Trump
- Preceded by: Thomas Hushek

Personal details
- Education: Pomona College (BA); Stanford University (MA)

Michael J. Adler is an American diplomat who has served as the United States ambassador to South Sudan since 2022.

== Early life and education ==
Adler earned a bachelor's degree from Pomona College in 1986 and a master's degree from Stanford University.

== Career ==
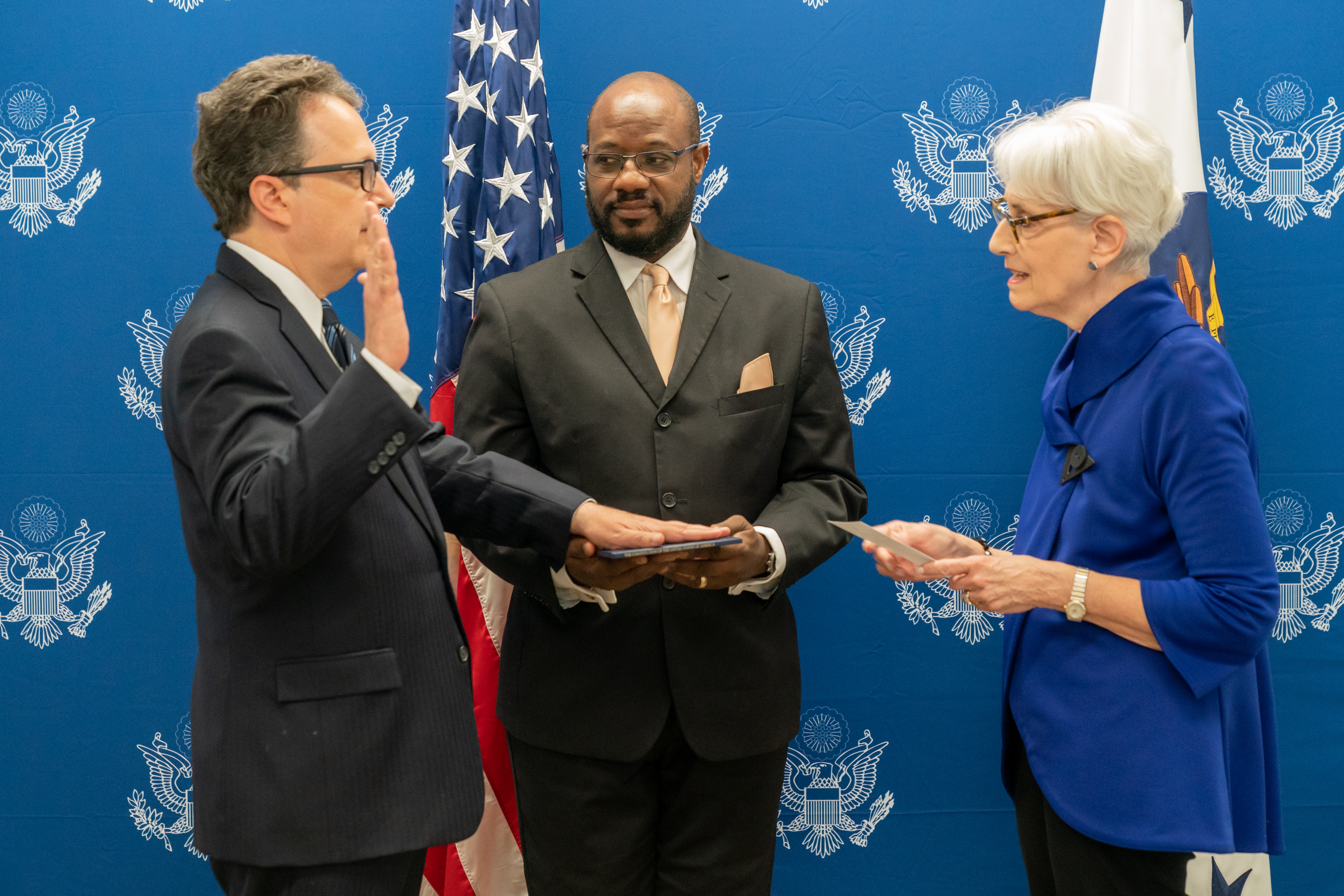
Adler sworn in as ambassador to South Sudan by Deputy Secretary of State Wendy Sherman in 2022

Adler is a career member of the Senior Foreign Service, with the rank of Minister-Counselor. Most recently, he has served on the White House National Security Council staff as the deputy senior director for South Asia and before that, the director for Afghanistan. Before joining the National Security Council, Adler served as the acting deputy assistant secretary for South and Central Asian Affairs at the State Department. He also held assignments in the State Department as director of the Office of Afghanistan Affairs, director of the Office of Near Eastern Affairs in the Bureau of Intelligence and Research, and in the Bureau of Political-Military Affairs and the Bureau of Near Eastern Affairs.

His overseas assignments have included service as deputy chief of mission of the U.S. Embassies in Lebanon and Kuwait, as political counselor at the U.S. Embassy in Afghanistan, and in Iraq, Bosnia and Herzegovina, France, and Qatar.

=== Ambassador to South Sudan ===
On January 26, 2022, President Joe Biden announced his intent to nominate Adler to be the next United States Ambassador to South Sudan. On February 3, 2022, his nomination was sent to the Senate. Hearings were held before the Senate Foreign Relations Committee on May 24, 2022. The committee favorably reported his nomination on June 9, 2022. On July 14, 2022, his nomination was confirmed by voice vote. Adler was sworn in on August 10, 2022, by Deputy Secretary of State Wendy Sherman, and presented his credentials on August 24, 2022.

Diplomatic posts
Preceded by David Renz; Chargé d'Affaires	United States Ambassador to South Sudan; 2022–present	Incumbent
