= List of ambassadors of the United States to South Sudan =

Ambassador of the United States to South Sudan
- Seal of the United States Department of State

- Flag of a United States ambassador

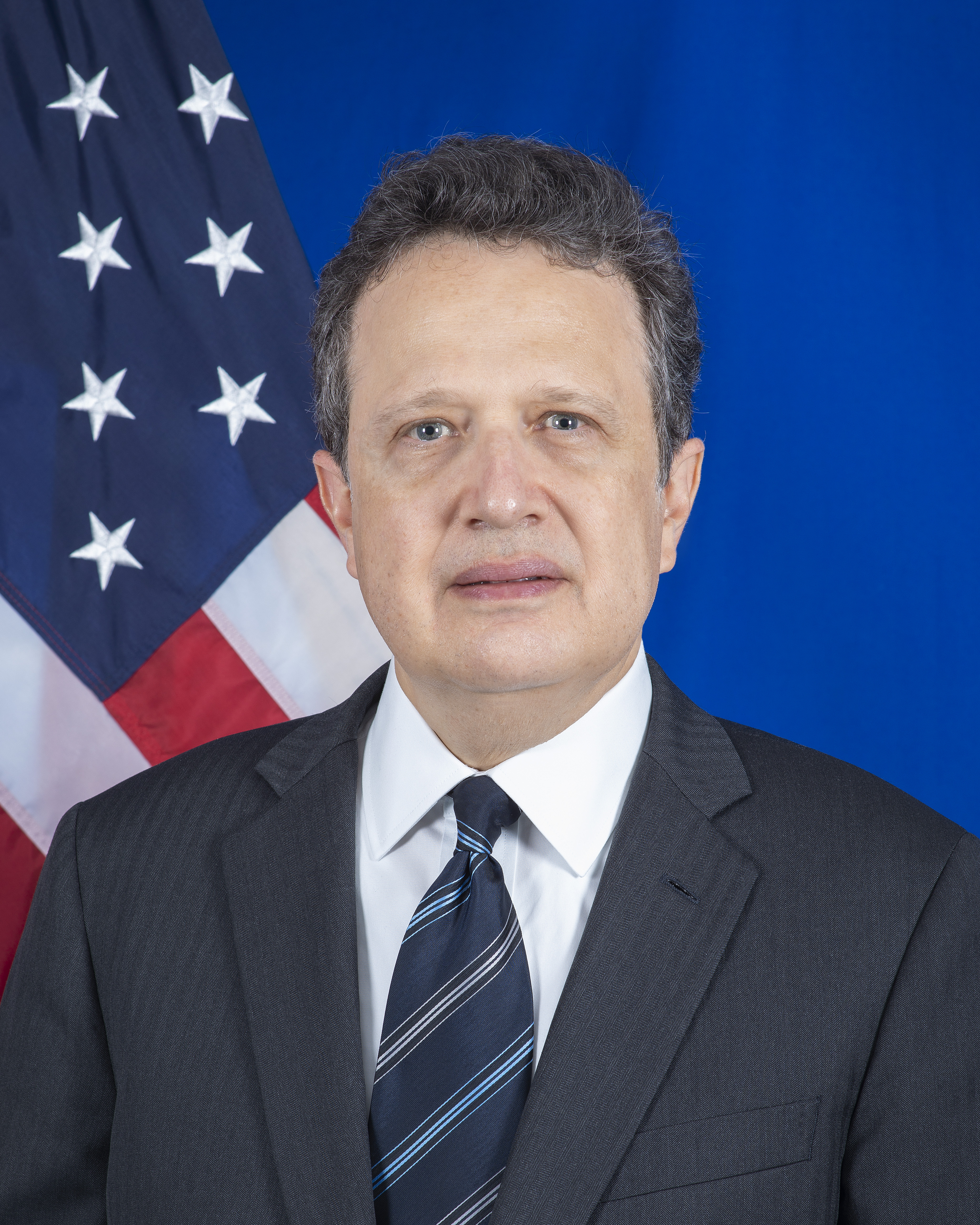
- Incumbent; Michael J. Adler since August 24, 2022
- Nominator: The president of the United States
- Inaugural holder: Susan Page as Ambassador
- Formation: July 9, 2011
- Website: U.S. Embassy – Juba

The United States ambassador to South Sudan is the official representative of the president of the United States to the head of state of the Republic of South Sudan.

The government of the United States recognized South Sudan on its independence day, July 9, 2011. On the same day, the existing U.S. consulate (accredited to the Republic of Sudan) in the capital Juba was upgraded to embassy. R. Barrie Walkley, the U.S. Consul General in Juba was appointed to serve as Chargé d'Affaires pending the appointment of a U.S. Ambassador to South Sudan.

On August 18, 2011, President Obama announced his intention to nominate Susan D. Page to be the first U.S. Ambassador to South Sudan. Page served in her role as U.S. Ambassador to South Sudan from October 2011 through July 2015. The current U.S. Ambassador to South Sudan is Michael J. Adler.

== Chiefs of mission ==
| Name | Title | Appointed | Presented credentials | Terminated mission | Notes |
|---|---|---|---|---|---|
| Barrie Walkley – Career FSO | Charge d'Affaires ad interim | July 9, 2011 | N/A | December 6, 2011 | |
| Susan Page – Career FSO | Ambassador | December 6, 2011 | December 8, 2011 | August 23, 2014 | |
| Mary Catherine Phee - Career FSO | Ambassador | July 15, 2015 | July 23, 2015 | August 22, 2017 | |
| Michael K. Morrow - Career FSO | Charge d'Affaires ad interim | August 22, 2017 | N/A | April 26, 2018 | |
| Thomas Hushek - Career FSO | Ambassador | April 26, 2018 | June 4, 2018 | July 17, 2020 | |
| Jon F. Danilowicz - Career FSO | Charge d'Affaires ad interim | July 17, 2020 | N/A | August 2021 | |
| David Renz - Career FSO | Charge d'Affaires ad interim | August 2021 | N/A | June 4, 2022 | |
| William Flens - Career FSO | Charge d'Affaires ad interim | June 4, 2022 | N/A | August 24, 2022 | |
| Michael J. Adler - Career FSO | Ambassador | July 14, 2022 | August 24, 2022 | Incumbent | |

== See also ==
- Embassy of the United States, Juba
- South Sudan-United States relations
- Foreign relations of South Sudan
- Ambassadors of the United States
