= List of ambassadors appointed by Donald Trump =

List of ambassadors appointed by Donald Trump may refer to:

- List of ambassadors appointed in the first Trump presidency
- List of ambassadors appointed in the second Trump presidency
