= Susan D. Page =

American diplomat

Susan Page
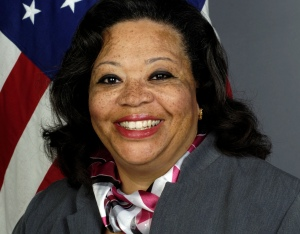

1st United States Ambassador to South Sudan
- In office December 8, 2011 – August 23, 2014
- President: Barack Obama
- Preceded by: R. Barrie Walkley (as chargé d’Affaires)
- Succeeded by: Mary Catherine Phee

Personal details
- Born: Susan Denise Page; 1964 (age 61–62)
- Education: University of Michigan (A.B.); Harvard Law School (J.D.); University of St Andrews

Susan Denise Page (born 1964) is retired American diplomat who served as the first US Ambassador to South Sudan and later served in senior representative roles at the United Nations, including the Special Representative of the UN Secretary General for the United Nations Mission for Justice Support in Haiti (MINUJUSTH) and Deputy Special Representative for the Rule of Law at the United Nations Stabilization Mission in Haiti (MINUSTAH).

== Education ==
She is a 1982 alumna of Homewood-Flossmoor High School in Flossmoor, Illinois. Page received an A.B. in English with high distinction from the University of Michigan and a J.D. from Harvard Law School. She has also studied at the University of St. Andrews in Scotland and conducted research on children and women's rights in Nepal through a Rotary International post-graduate fellowship.

== Career ==
Page served as the first United States Ambassador to South Sudan, the Acting United States Ambassador to the African Union and the United Nations Economic Commission for Africa as well as in other diplomatic postings. In addition, she has served the United Nations and has held the positions of Director of the Rule of Law Advisory Unit in the United Nations Mission in the Sudan (UNMIS) and Senior Legal Adviser for the United Nations Development Programme (UNDP) in Sudan and in Rwanda.

Page's ambassadorial nomination was announced by the White House on August 18, 2011 and she was confirmed on October 18, 2011. She served in her role as U.S. Ambassador to South Sudan from October 2011 through July 2015. In 2020, Page was appointed as Professor of Practice in International Diplomacy at the University of Michigan's Gerald R. Ford School of Public Policy, and Professor from Practice at the University of Michigan's Law School.

== Personal life ==
Page is Catholic.

Diplomatic posts
| Preceded by R. Barrie Walkley; Acting | United States Ambassador to South Sudan; 2011–2014 | Succeeded by Mary Catherine Phee |
