= Simon Henshaw =

American diplomat (1960–2020)

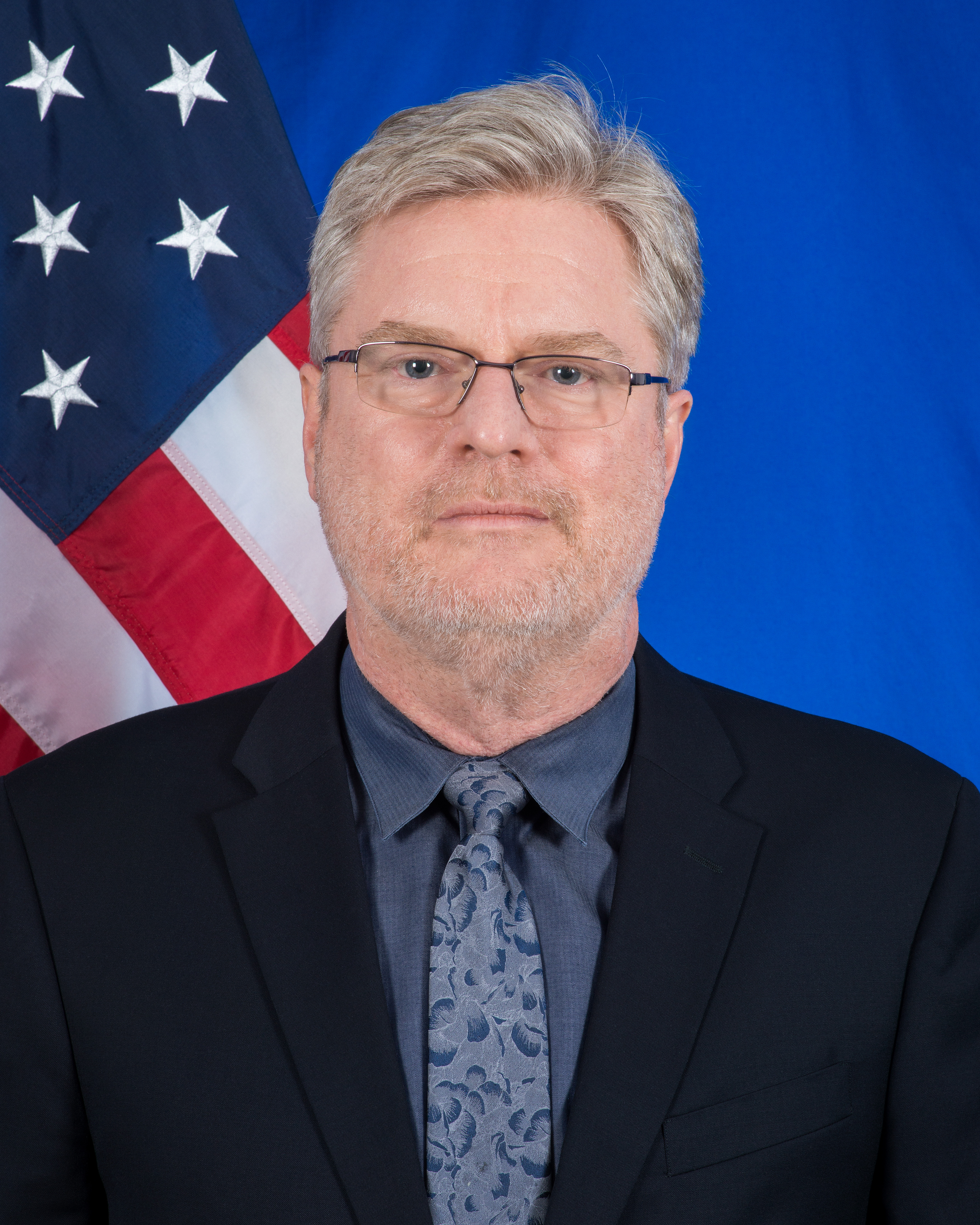

United States Ambassador to Guinea
- In office March 4, 2019 – June 9, 2020
- Appointed by: Donald Trump
- Preceded by: Dennis B. Hankins
- Succeeded by: Troy D. Fitrell

Personal details
- Born: October 7, 1960 England
- Died: June 9, 2020 (aged 59) Guinea
- Spouse: Jackie Henshaw
- Children: Maddie Henshaw; Sandy Henshaw
- Education: University of Massachusetts Amherst (B.A.); National War College (M.S.)

Simon Henshaw (October 7, 1960 – June 9, 2020) was an American diplomat who served as the United States Ambassador to Guinea from 2019 until his death.

== Education ==
He graduated from The Bromfield School in 1978. Henshaw earned a Bachelor of Arts from the University of Massachusetts Amherst and a Master of Science from the National War College.

== Career ==
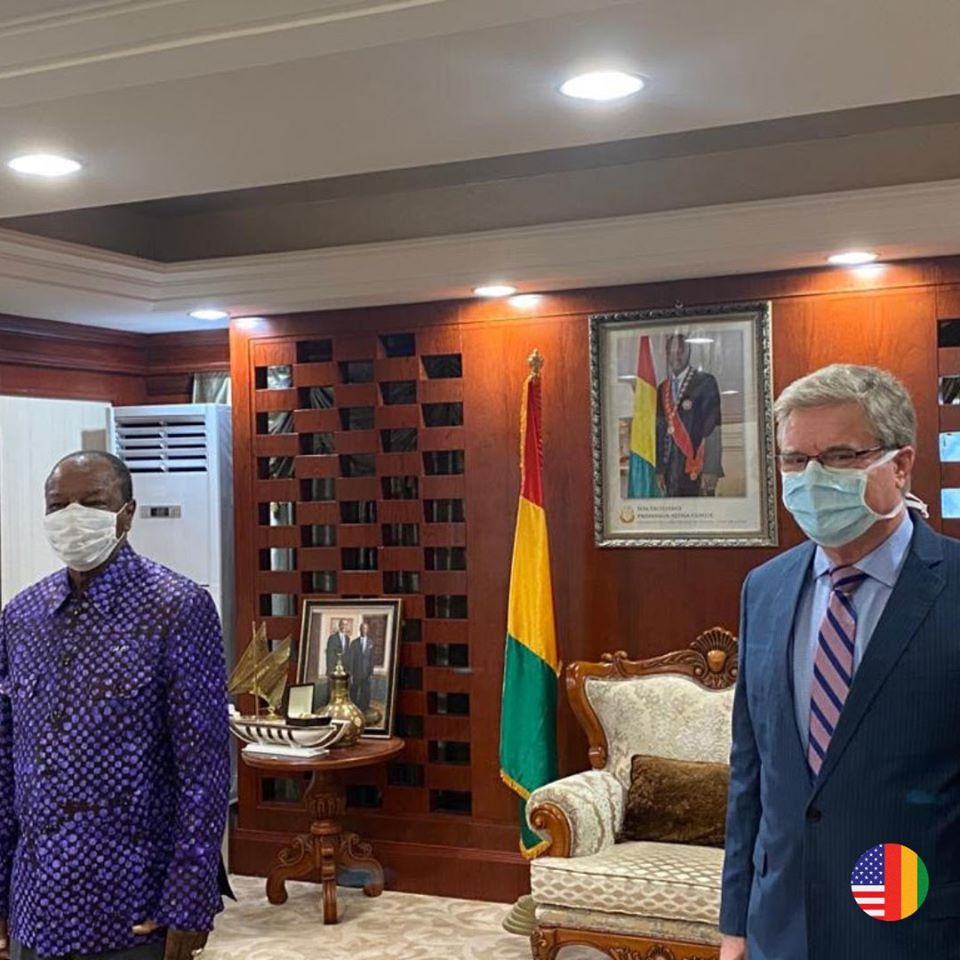
Ambassador Henshaw meets with President Alpha Condé in April 2020 to discuss the COVID-19 pandemic in Guinea.

Henshaw was a career member of the Senior Foreign Service, class of Minister-Counselor, and served as an American diplomat since 1985. He served in senior leadership positions at the Department of State, including, from 2013 to 2018 at the Bureau of Population, Refugees and Migration, first as Principal Deputy Assistant Secretary and, starting in 2017, as Acting Assistant Secretary. From 2011 to 2013, he served as Director of the Office of Andean Affairs, and, from 2008 to 2011, he served as Deputy Chief of Mission at the United States Embassy in Tegucigalpa, Honduras. He also served at five other overseas diplomatic posts. Prior to his ambassadorship he was a senior advisor to the Health Incidents Response Task Force for the Cuba Accountability Review Board at the Department of State, coordinating efforts to respond to a series of health and security incidents affecting United States diplomats in Cuba and China.

On August 10, 2018, President Trump announced his intent to nominate Henshaw as the next United States Ambassador to Guinea. On August 16, 2018, his nomination was sent to the United States Senate. On September 26, 2018, he appeared before the United States Senate Committee on Foreign Relations. On January 2, 2019, his nomination was confirmed in the Senate by voice vote. He presented his credentials to President Alpha Condé on March 4, 2019.

== Personal life ==
Henshaw spoke French, Spanish, basic Russian, and basic Portuguese. He died of a heart attack on June 9, 2020, in Guinea while serving as the U.S. Ambassador.

== See also ==
- List of ambassadors of the United States

Diplomatic posts
Preceded by Dennis B. Hankins	United States Ambassador to Guinea; 2019–2020	Succeeded by Troy D. Fitrell
