= Adam M. Scheinman =

American government official

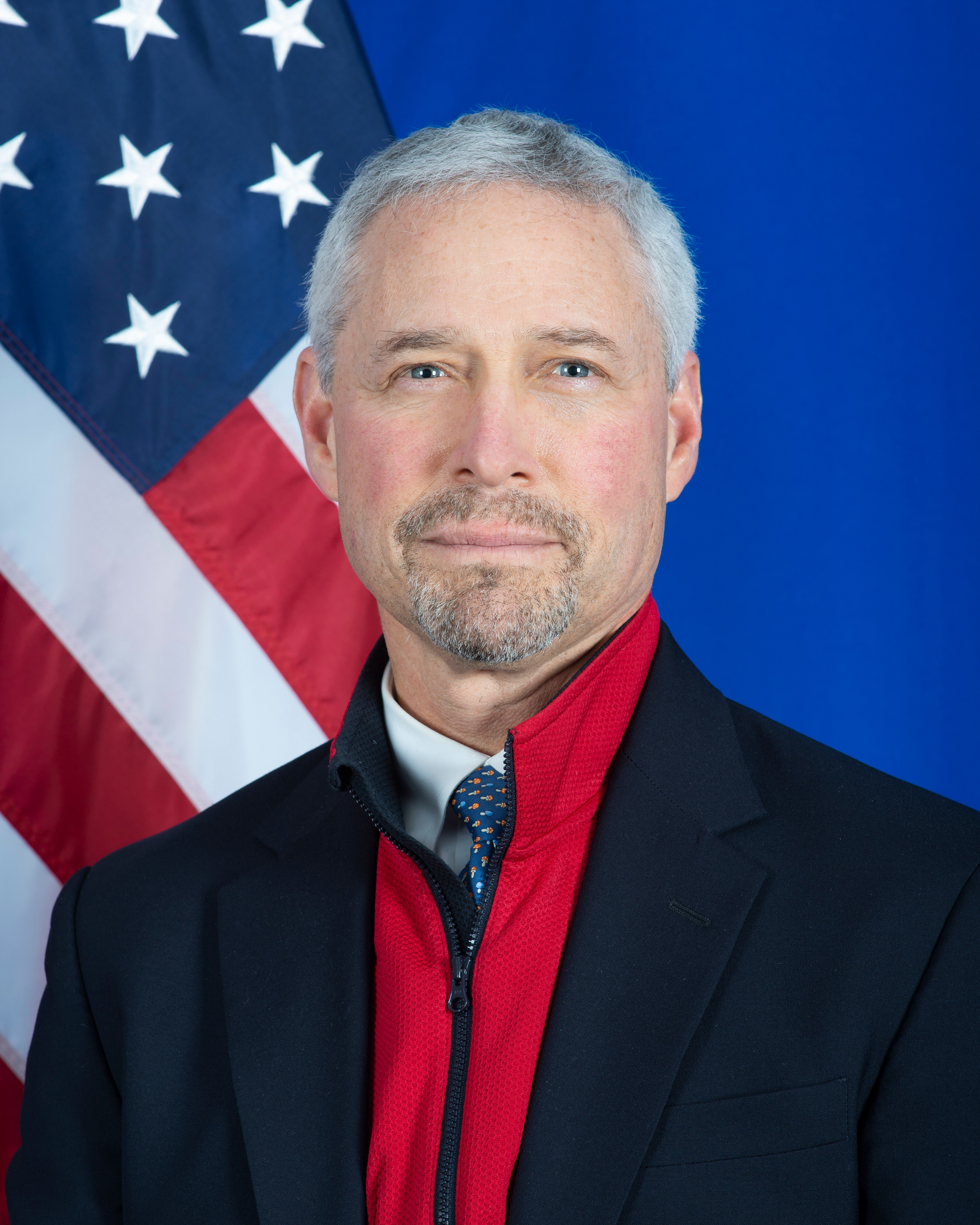

Special Representative of the President for Nuclear Nonproliferation
- In office December 20, 2021 – January 20, 2025
- President: Joe Biden
- Preceded by: Jeffrey L. Eberhardt
- Succeeded by: TBD
- In office September 2014 – January 2017
- President: Barack Obama
- Preceded by: position established
- Succeeded by: Jeffrey L. Eberhardt

Adam M. Scheinman is an American government official. He served as Special Representative of the President for Nuclear Nonproliferation within the Bureau of International Security and Nonproliferation at the State Department from 2021 to 2025. He previously served in the same role from 2014 through 2017 under President Barack Obama. He also served as a professor of Practice and the Department of Energy Faculty Chair at the National War College.

== Early life and education ==
Scheinman earned a bachelor's degree at Cornell University in 1987, and a master's degree at George Washington University in 1990.

== Career ==
Scheinman is a career member of the Senior Executive Service. From 1999 to 2009, he held a number of positions in the Department of Energy's National Nuclear Security Administration, working in the Office of Nonproliferation and International Security, Office of Arms Control and Nonproliferation, and Nonproliferation and National Security. From 1995 to 1999, he served as Foreign Affairs Analyst in the Office of International Policy and Analysis Division at the Department of Energy.

=== Obama administration ===
During the Obama administration, Scheinman served as Special Representative of the President for Nuclear Nonproliferation, with the rank of Ambassador. President Obama nominated Scheinman on July 18, 2013. Hearings on his nomination were held before the Senate Foreign Relations Committee on September 26, 2013. The committee favorably reported his nomination on October 31, 2013. Scheinman's nomination was not acted on for the rest of the year and was returned to President Obama on January 3, 2014.

President Obama renominated Scheinman the next day. The committee favorably reported his nomination on January 15, 2014. Scheinman was confirmed on September 18, 2014, by voice vote.

=== Biden administration ===
On April 27, 2021, President Joe Biden nominated Scheinman to be the Special Representative of the President for Nuclear Nonproliferation. Hearings on his nomination were held before the Senate Foreign Relations Committee on September 15, 2021. The committee favorably reported his nomination to the Senate floor on October 19, 2021. The entire Senate confirmed Scheinman by voice vote on December 18, 2021.

Scheinman started his position on December 20, 2021.

== Personal life ==
Scheinman is married and has three children.
