= Thomas Hushek =

American diplomat (born 1963)

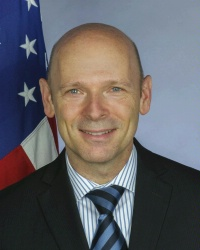

3rd United States Ambassador to South Sudan
- In office April 26, 2018 – July 17, 2020
- President: Donald Trump
- Preceded by: Mary Catherine Phee
- Succeeded by: Jon F. Danilowicz, (Chargé d'Affaires)

Personal details
- Born: 1963 (age 62–63) Wisconsin, U.S.
- Education: University of Wisconsin (B.A.); Columbia University (MIA)

Thomas J. Hushek (born 1963) is an American diplomat who served as the United States Ambassador to South Sudan from 2018 to 2020.

== Education ==
Hushek received a Bachelor of Arts degree in political science from the University of Wisconsin and a Master of International Affairs in human rights and Soviet studies from Columbia University.

== Career ==
Hushek is a career member of the Senior Foreign Service. He has been working for the State Department since 1988. He has served at multiple capacities including being the Deputy Chief of Mission at the U.S. Mission to the International Organizations in Vienna, Principal Deputy Assistant Secretary in the Bureau of Conflict and Stabilization Operations and has worked in U.S. embassies in Micronesia, Russia and Tajikistan.

=== United States Ambassador to South Sudan ===
On August 3, 2017, Hushek was nominated as the United States Ambassador to South Sudan. On April 26, 2018, the Senate confirmed his nomination by voice vote. His mission terminated on July 17, 2020.

== Personal life ==
Hushek speaks Russian and Persian.

== See also ==
- List of ambassadors appointed by Donald Trump

Diplomatic posts
Preceded by Mary Catherine Phee	United States Ambassador to South Sudan; 2018–2020	Succeeded by Jon F. Danilowicz; Chargé d'Affaires
