= R. Barrie Walkley =

American diplomat

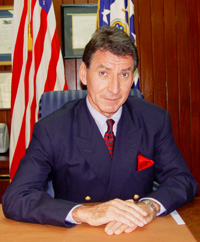

United States Special Envoy for the African Great Lakes and the Congo-Kinshasa
- In office December 6, 2011 – July 18, 2013
- President: Barack Obama
- Succeeded by: Russ Feingold

United States Ambassador to South Sudan
- Acting
- In office July 9, 2011 – December 6, 2011
- President: Barack Obama
- Preceded by: Diplomatic relations established
- Succeeded by: Susan D. Page

United States Ambassador to Gabon
- In office November 12, 2004 – April 27, 2007
- President: George W. Bush
- Preceded by: Kenneth Price Moorfield
- Succeeded by: Eunice Reddick

United States Ambassador to São Tomé and Príncipe
- In office November 11, 2004 – April 27, 2007
- President: George W. Bush
- Preceded by: Kenneth Price Moorfield
- Succeeded by: Eunice Reddick

United States Ambassador to Guinea
- In office November 22, 2001 – February 10, 2004
- President: George W. Bush
- Preceded by: Joyce Ellen Leader
- Succeeded by: Jackson McDonald

Personal details
- Born: 1944 (age 81–82)
- Profession: Diplomat

R. Barrie Walkley (born 1944) is a career foreign service officer and the former Special Advisor to Secretary of State Clinton for the Great Lakes and the Democratic Republic of the Congo. He was appointed to this position in December 2011 and served until June 18, 2013, when he was replaced by former U.S. Senator Russ Feingold.

Previously, he served as the American ambassador to Gabon and later to concurrent appointments to Guinea and to Sao Tome and Principe. He was called back to service and appointed Chargé d'Affaires for South Sudan at its independence. (Susan D. Page later became the first ambassador.) He holds degrees from the University of California, Santa Barbara, the University of California, Los Angeles and the University of Southern California. He and his wife Annabelle were Peace Corps volunteers in Somalia (1967–1969).

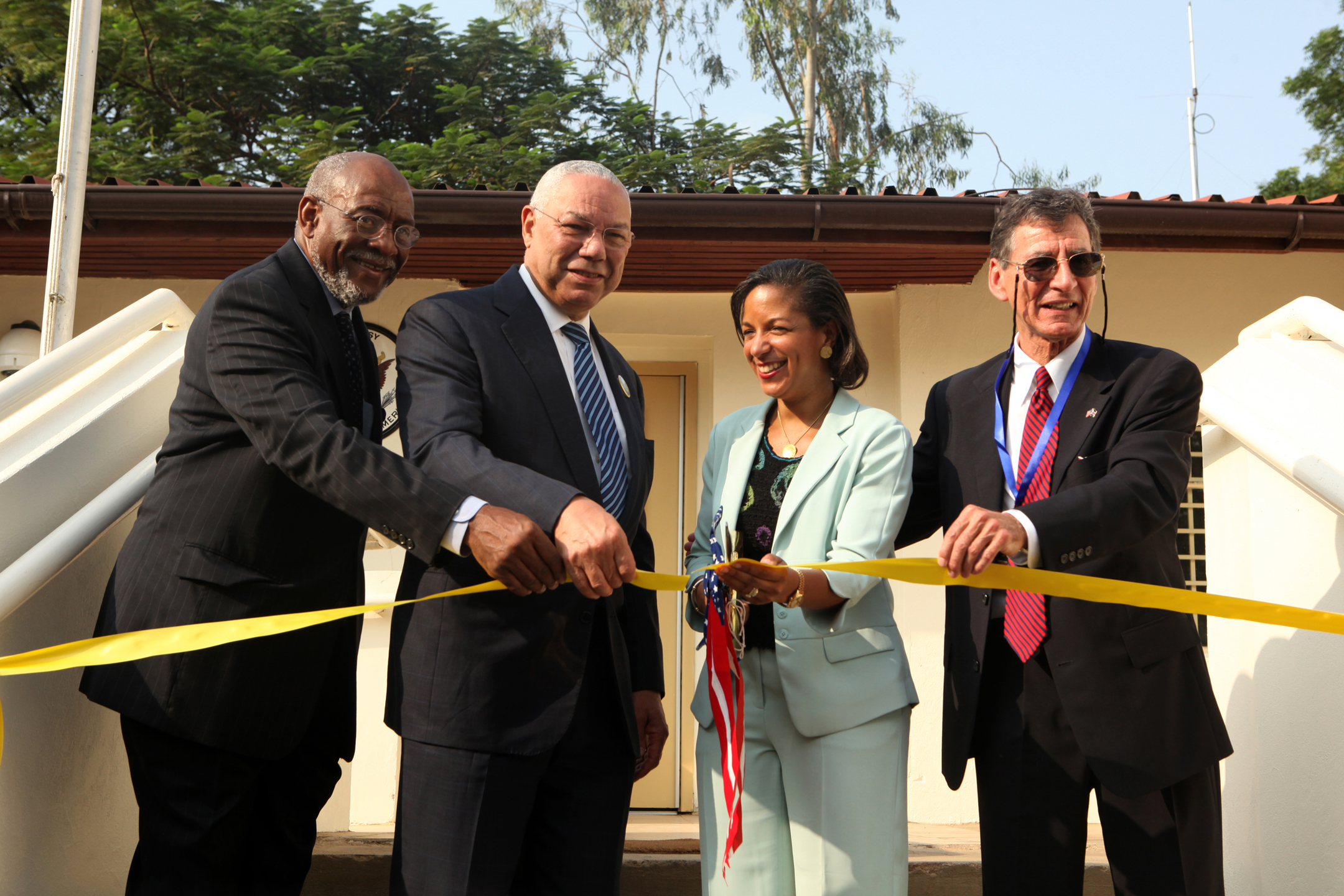
Johnnie Carson, Assistant Secretary of State for the Bureau of African Affairs; Ret. General Colin Powell, former U.S. Secretary of State; Susan E. Rice, U.S. Permanent Representative to the United Nations; and R. Barrie Walkley inaugurating the new U.S. Embassy in Juba, South Sudan on Independence Day, July 9, 2011.

Diplomatic posts
Preceded by Joyce Ellen Leader	United States Ambassador to Guinea; 2001–2004	Succeeded by Jackson McDonald
Preceded by Kenneth Price Moorfield	United States Ambassador to Gabon; 2004–2007	Succeeded by Eunice S. Reddick
Preceded by Kenneth Price Moorfield	United States Ambassador to São Tomé and Príncipe; 2004–2007	Succeeded by Eunice S. Reddick
Preceded by Diplomatic relations established	United States Ambassador to South Sudan; Acting; 2011	Succeeded by Susan D. Page
