= List of ambassadors of the United States to Guinea =

Ambassador of the United States to Guinea
- Seal of the United States Department of State

- Flag of a United States ambassador

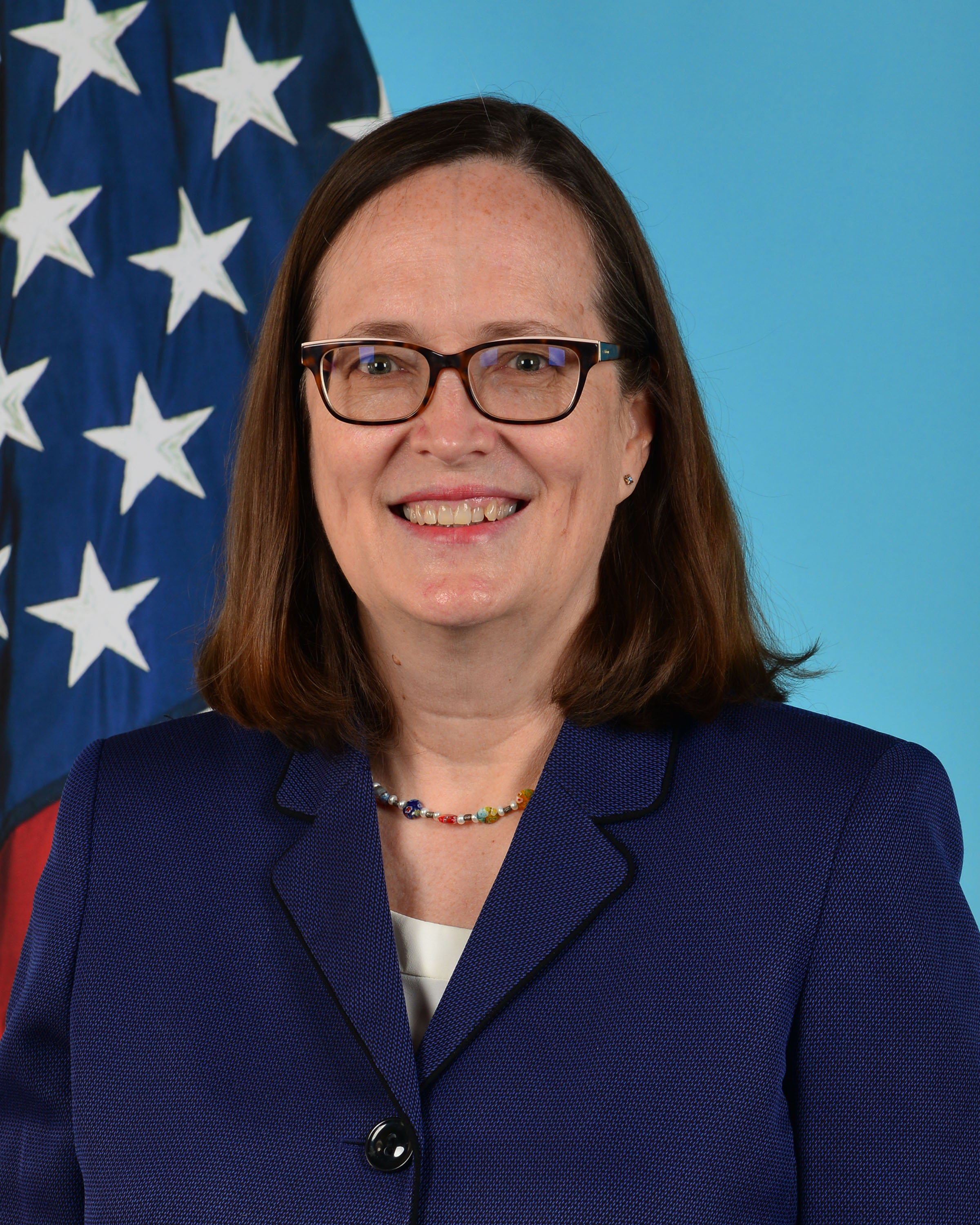
- Incumbent; Mary E. Daschbach; Chargé d'affaires since July 15, 2025
- Nominator: The president of the United States
- Appointer: The president with Senate advice and consent
- Inaugural holder: Robert W. Rinden; Chargé d'Affaires ad interim
- Formation: February 13, 1959
- Website: U.S. Embassy - Conakry

The United States ambassador to Guinea is the official representative of the government of the United States to the government of Guinea. This is a list of the United States ambassadors to Guinea

== Ambassadors ==
Representative	Title	Presentation of credentials	Termination of mission	Appointed by
Robert W. Rinden	Chargé d'Affaires ad interim	February 13, 1959	July 30, 1959	Dwight D. Eisenhower
John H. Morrow	Ambassador Extraordinary and Plenipotentiary	July 30, 1959	March 3, 1961	Dwight D. Eisenhower
William Attwood	Ambassador Extraordinary and Plenipotentiary	April 26, 1961	May 27, 1963	John F. Kennedy
James I. Loeb	Ambassador Extraordinary and Plenipotentiary	September 21, 1963	September 21, 1965	John F. Kennedy
Robinson McIlvaine	Ambassador Extraordinary and Plenipotentiary	October 27, 1966	September 25, 1969	Lyndon B. Johnson
Albert W. Sherer, Jr.	Ambassador Extraordinary and Plenipotentiary	March 31, 1970	December 21, 1971	Richard Nixon
Terence A. Todman	Ambassador Extraordinary and Plenipotentiary	August 26, 1972	January 3, 1975	Richard Nixon
William C. Harrop	Ambassador Extraordinary and Plenipotentiary	May 29, 1975	July 15, 1977	Gerald Ford
Oliver S. Crosby	Ambassador Extraordinary and Plenipotentiary	December 9, 1977	August 1, 1980	Jimmy Carter
Allen C. Davis	Ambassador Extraordinary and Plenipotentiary	September 24, 1980	May 29, 1983	Jimmy Carter
James D. Rosenthal	Ambassador Extraordinary and Plenipotentiary	June 29, 1983	July 6, 1986	Ronald Reagan
William C. Mithoefer	Chargé d'Affaires ad interim	July 6, 1986	October 10, 1987	Ronald Reagan
Samuel E. Lupo	Ambassador Extraordinary and Plenipotentiary	October 10, 1987	May 22, 1990	Ronald Reagan
Dane F. Smith	Ambassador Extraordinary and Plenipotentiary	August 16, 1990	July 21, 1993	George H. W. Bush
Joseph A. Saloom	Ambassador Extraordinary and Plenipotentiary	September 9, 1993	July 18, 1996	Bill Clinton
Tibor P. Nagy	Ambassador Extraordinary and Plenipotentiary	October 10, 1996	July 25, 1999	Bill Clinton
Joyce Ellen Leader	Ambassador Extraordinary and Plenipotentiary	September 29, 1999	July 7, 2000	Bill Clinton
R. Barrie Walkley	Ambassador Extraordinary and Plenipotentiary	November 22, 2001	February 10, 2004	George W. Bush
Jackson McDonald	Ambassador Extraordinary and Plenipotentiary	September 29, 2004	April 2, 2007	George W. Bush
Phillip Carter	Ambassador Extraordinary and Plenipotentiary	November 7, 2007	August 19, 2008	George W. Bush
Patricia Moller	Ambassador Extraordinary and Plenipotentiary	March 26, 2010	September 12, 2012	Barack Obama
Alexander M. Laskaris	Ambassador Extraordinary and Plenipotentiary	September 28, 2012	November 10, 2015	Barack Obama
Dennis B. Hankins	Ambassador Extraordinary and Plenipotentiary	November 25, 2015	January 29, 2019	Barack Obama
Simon Henshaw	Ambassador Extraordinary and Plenipotentiary	March 4, 2019	June 9, 2020	Donald Trump
Troy D. Fitrell	Ambassador Extraordinary and Plenipotentiary	January 19, 2022	January 20, 2025	Joe Biden
Anne Dudte	Chargé d'Affaires ad interim	January 20, 2025	July 15, 2025	Donald Trump
Mary E. Daschbach	Chargé d'Affaires ad interim	July 15, 2025	Present	Donald Trump

== See also ==
- Guinea – United States relations
- Foreign relations of Guinea
- Ambassadors of the United States
