= Bureau of African Affairs =

U.S. State Department division

- Seal of the United States Department of State

Bureau overview
- Formed: 1958; 68 years ago
- Jurisdiction: Executive branch of the United States
- Headquarters: Harry S. Truman Building, Washington, D.C., United States
- Employees: 1,923 (as of FY2017)
- Annual budget: $1.54 billion (FY 2016)
- Bureau executive: Frank Garcia, Assistant Secretary of State for African Affairs
- Parent department: U.S. Department of State
- Parent bureau: Office of the Under Secretary of State for Political Affairs
- Website: state.gov/af

The Bureau of African Affairs (AF) is part of the United States Department of State and is charged with advising the Secretary of State on matters of Sub-Saharan Africa. The bureau was established in 1958. It is headed by the Assistant Secretary of State for African Affairs who reports to the Under Secretary of State for Political Affairs.

== Organization ==
The offices of the Bureau of African Affairs direct, coordinate, and supervise U.S. government activities within the region, including political, economic, consular, public diplomacy, and administrative management issues.

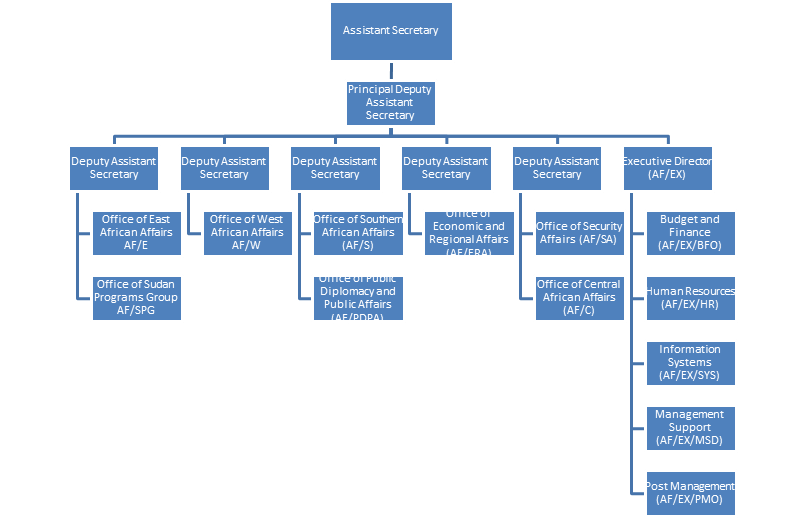
Organizational chart of the Bureau of African Affairs

- Office of East African Affairs – Oversees policy for the East African Region, and liaises with the U.S. Embassies in Comoros, Djibouti, Eritrea, Ethiopia, Kenya, Madagascar, Mauritius, Seychelles, Somalia, Tanzania, and Uganda
- Office of Sudan and South Sudan - Oversees policy for the Republic of the Sudan and the Republic of South Sudan.
- Office of Central African Affairs – Oversees policy for the Central African Region, and liaises with the U.S. Embassies in Burundi, Cameroon, Central African Republic, Chad, Democratic Republic of the Congo, Republic of the Congo, Equatorial Guinea, Gabon, Rwanda, and São Tomé and Príncipe
- Office of Southern African Affairs – Oversees policy for the South African Region, and liaises with the U.S. Embassies in Angola, Botswana, Eswatini, Lesotho, Malawi, Mozambique, Namibia, South Africa, Zambia, and Zimbabwe
- Office of West African Affairs – Oversees policy for the West African Region, and liaises with the U.S. Embassies in Benin, Burkina Faso, Cape Verde, Côte d'Ivoire, the Gambia, Ghana, Guinea, Guinea-Bissau, Liberia, Mali, Mauritania, Niger, Nigeria, Senegal, Sierra Leone, and Togo
- Office of Economic Policy and Staff
- Office of the Executive Director – Coordinates logistics, management, budget, and human resources for the bureau
- Office of Public Diplomacy and Public Affairs – Coordinates public outreach and digital engagement, and prepares press guidance for the Department Spokesperson in the Bureau of Public Affairs
- Office of Regional Peace and Security – Coordinates policy regarding the African Union and other regional multilateral and security-focused issues
