= List of ambassadors of the United States to Mauritius =

Ambassador of the United States to Mauritius
- Seal of the United States Department of State

- Flag of a United States ambassador

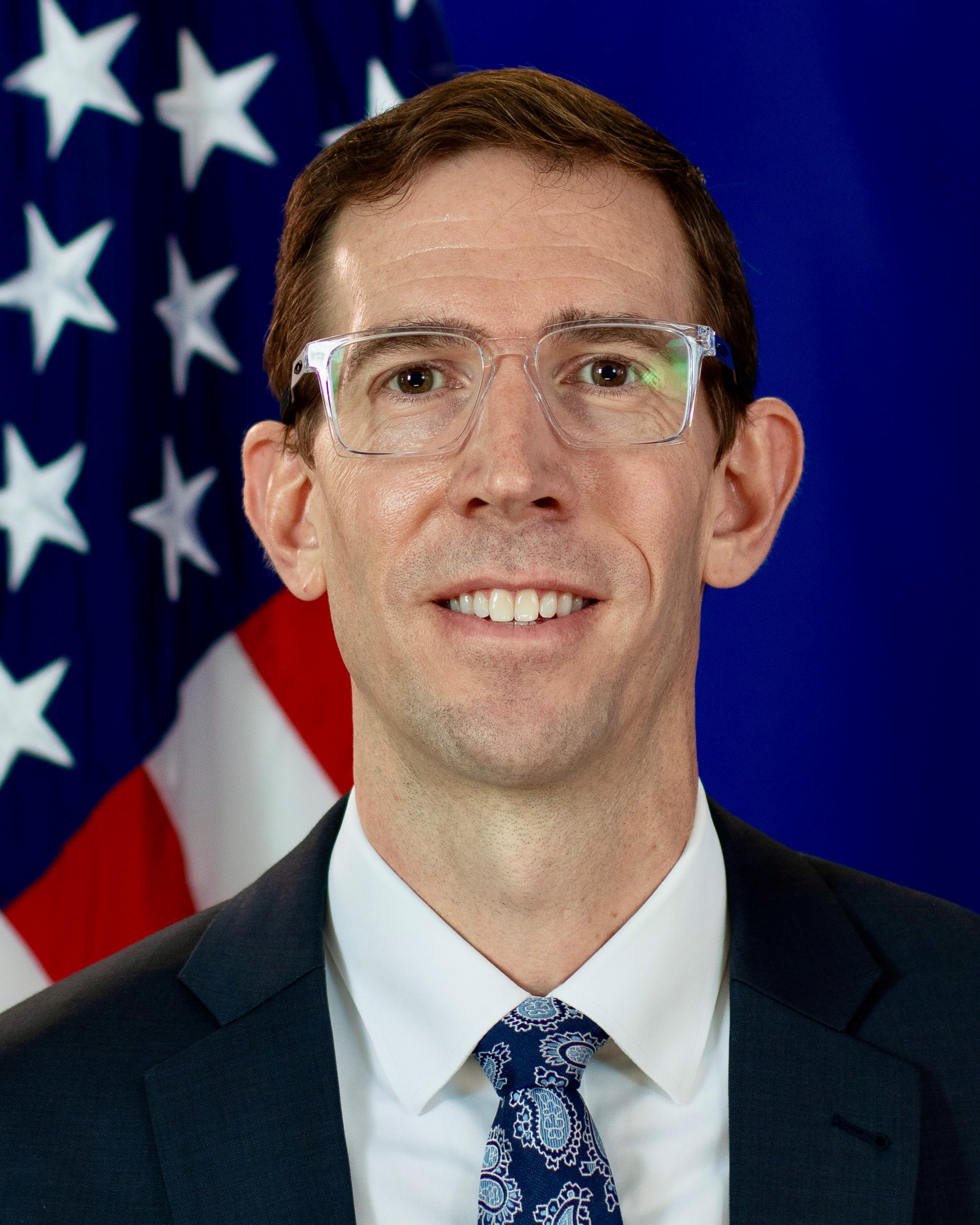
- Incumbent; Craig Halbmaier; Chargé d'affaires since January 17, 2026
- Nominator: The president of the United States
- Appointer: The president with Senate advice and consent
- Inaugural holder: William B. Hussey as interim ambassador
- Formation: March 12, 1968
- Website: mu.usembassy.gov

The United States ambassador to Mauritius is the official representative of the government of the United States to the government of Mauritius. The ambassador is concurrently the ambassador to Seychelles, while resident in Port Louis, Mauritius.

== Ambassadors ==
This is a list of United States ambassadors to Mauritius.

- March 1968 – June 1968 William B. Hussey; Interim; Established embassy March 12, 1968
- July 29, 1968 – August 16, 1969 David S. King
- June 29, 1970 – July 23, 1973 William D. Brewer
- May 24, 1974 – May 10, 1976 Philip W. Manhard
- June 23, 1976 – September 17, 1978 Robert V. Keeley
- December 20, 1978 – January 20, 1980 Samuel Rhea Gammon III
- April 17, 1980 – September 2, 1983 Robert C. F. Gordon
- November 7, 1983 – August 16, 1986 George Roberts Andrews
- November 14, 1986 – October 21, 1989 Ronald D. Palmer
- December 6, 1989 – November 19, 1992 Penne Percy Korth
- December 15, 1993 – April 14, 1996 Leslie M. Alexander
- August 13, 1996 – July 27, 1999 Harold W. Geisel (Also accredited to the Seychelles)
- August 24, 1999 – March 4, 2001 Mark Wylea Erwin (Also accredited to the Seychelles)
- April 26, 2002 – June 22, 2005 John Price (Also accredited to the Seychelles)
- October 2, 2006 – October 14, 2009 Cesar B. Cabrera (Also accredited to the Seychelles)
- February 18, 2010 – February 26, 2011 Mary Jo Wills (Also accredited to the Seychelles)
- November 5, 2012 – January 20, 2017 Shari Villarosa (Also accredited to the Seychelles)
- February 6, 2018 – January 15, 2021 David Dale Reimer (Also accredited to the Seychelles)
- February 22, 2023 – January 16, 2026 Henry V. Jardine (Also accredited to the Seychelles)

== See also ==
- Mauritius – United States relations
- Foreign relations of Mauritius
- Ambassadors of the United States
