= Massacre at Huế =

1968 Vietnam War massacre by North Vietnamese forces

Huế Massacre
- Part of the Tet Offensive of the Vietnam War
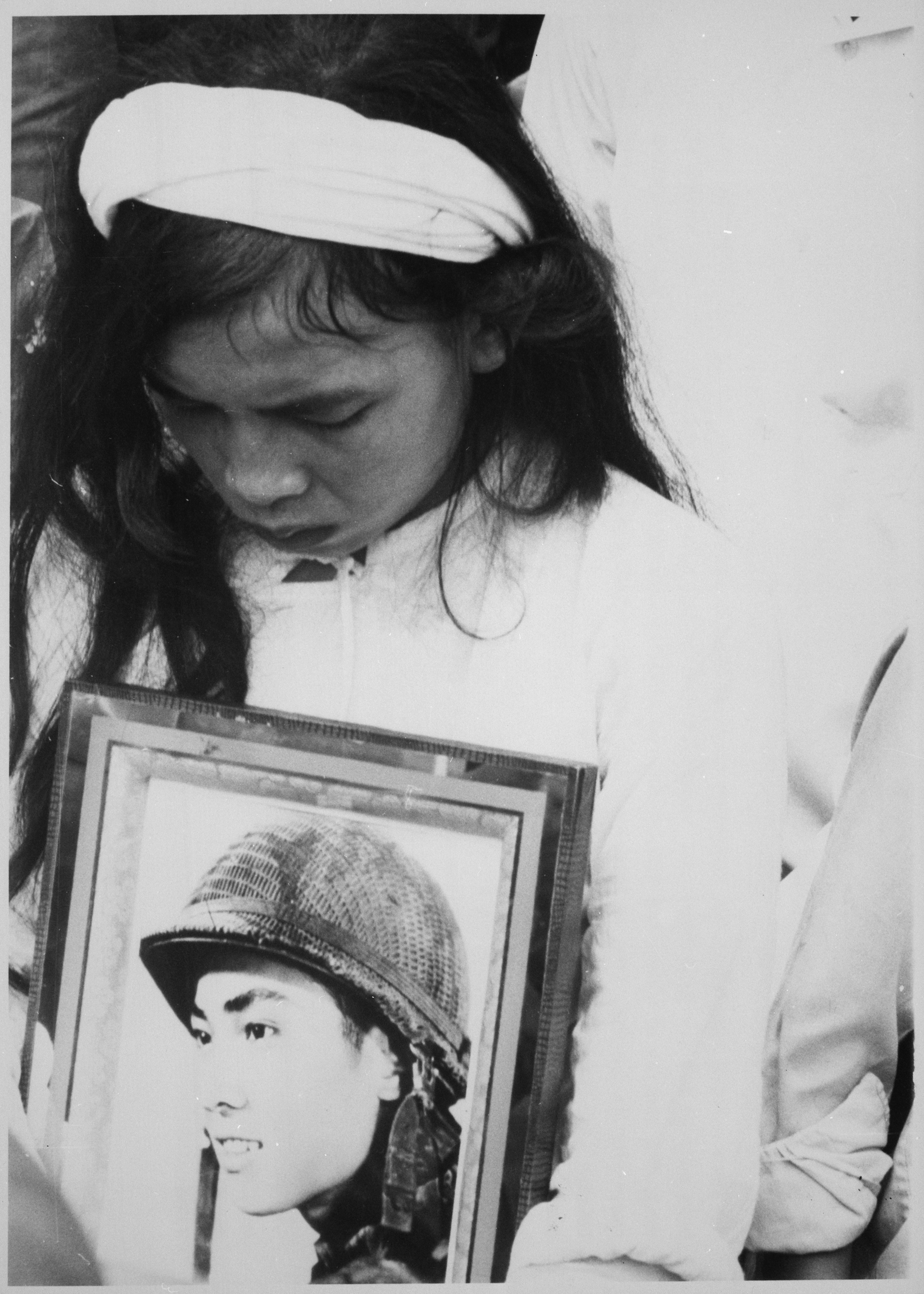
- A bereaved girl holding up a portrait of a massacre victim relative.
- Location: Huế, South Vietnam
- Date: 28 February 1968; 58 years ago
- Attack type: Massacre
- Deaths: 2,800–6,000
- Victims: Civilians and prisoners of war
- Perpetrators: Viet Cong and People's Army of Vietnam

The Huế massacre (Vietnamese: Thảm sát Tết Mậu Thân ở Huế, lit. 'Tết Offensive massacre in Huế') was the summary executions and mass murder perpetrated by the Viet Cong and People's Army of Vietnam (PAVN) during their capture, military occupation and later withdrawal from the city of Huế during the Tet Offensive, considered one of the longest and bloodiest battles of the Vietnam War.

The Battle of Huế began on 31 January 1968, and lasted for 26 days. During the months and years that followed, dozens of mass graves were discovered in and around Huế. The estimated death toll was between 2,800 and 6,000 civilians and prisoners of war, or 5–10% of the total population of Huế. The Republic of Vietnam (South Vietnam) released a list of 4,062 victims identified as having been either murdered or abducted. Victims were found bound, tortured, and sometimes buried alive. Many victims were also clubbed to death.

A number of U.S. and South Vietnamese authorities as well as a number of journalists and historians who investigated the events took the discoveries, along with other evidence, as proof that a large-scale atrocity had been carried out in and around Huế during its four-week occupation. The killings were perceived as part of a large-scale purge of a whole social stratum, including anyone friendly to American forces in the region.

== Executions ==
The Vietcong set up provisional authorities shortly after it had captured Huế in the early hours of 31 January 1968. They were charged with removing the existing government administration from power in the city and replacing it with a "revolutionary administration". Working from lists of "cruel tyrants and reactionary elements" previously developed by Vietcong intelligence officers, many people were to be rounded up following the initial hours of the attack. These included Army of the Republic of Vietnam (ARVN) soldiers, civil servants, political party members, local religious leaders, schoolteachers, American civilians, and other international people. Cadres called out the names on their lists over loudspeakers, ordering them to report to a local school. Those who did not report voluntarily were hunted down.

=== Communist preliminary occupation plans and orders ===
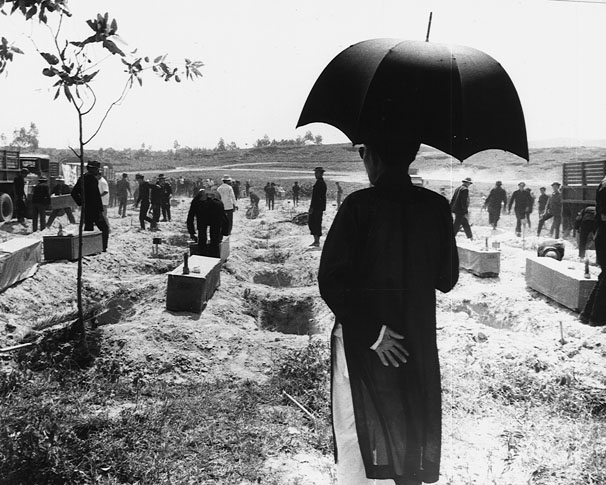
Burial of 300 unidentified victims

The communists' actions were based on a series of orders issued by the High Command and the PRG. In a document issued on 26 January 1968, by the Trị-Thiên-Huế Political Directorate, the political cadres were given specific instructions: "Operating in close support of the regular military and guerrilla elements, the political cadre were to: destroy and disorganize the Republic of Viet Nam's (RVN's) administrative machinery 'from province and district levels to the city wards, streets, and wharves;' motivate the people of Huế to take up arms, pursue the enemy, seize power, and establish a revolutionary government; motivate (recruit) local citizens for military and 'security' forces... transportation and supply activities, and to serve wounded soldiers...;" "pursue to the end (and) punish spies, reactionaries, and 'tyrants' and 'maintain order and security in the city.'"

Another section, dealing with Target Area 1 ("the Phu Ninh ward") read: "Annihilate all spies, reactionaries, and foreign teachers (such as Americans and Germans) in the area. Break open prisons. Investigate cadre, soldiers and receptive civilians imprisoned by the enemy. Search for tyrants and reactionaries who are receiving treatment in hospitals." The orders for Target Area 2 ("the Phu Vinh ward") were similar: "Annihilate the enemy in the area.... Rally the Buddhist force to advance the isolation of reactionaries who exploit the Catholics of Phu Cam." The orders for Target Area 3 ("the wharves along the An Cuu River and from Truong Sung to the Kho Ren Bridge") followed the same pattern: "Search for and pursue spies, tyrants and reactionaries hiding near the wharf.... Motivate the people in the areas along the River to annihilate the enemy." For Target Area 4 (the district including Phu Cam and the Binh Anh, Truong Giang, Truong Cuu and An Lang sections) the orders were "Search for and pursue spies and reactionaries in the area.... Destroy the power and influence of reactionary leaders...." For Area 1, Cell 3 was assigned the job of "Annihilation of tyrants and the elimination of traitors".

In June 1968, the American 1st Cavalry troops captured PAVN documents that included a directive written two days before the battle began. It included these instructions: "For the purpose of a lengthy occupation of Huế, we should immediately liberate the rural areas and annihilate the wicked GVN administrative personnel.

Specific Mission.... We must attack the enemy key agencies, economic installations, and lines of communications. We must also annihilate the enemy mobile troops, reactionary elements and tyrants."

On 1 February, the provincial administration, having taken control of Huế, issued a directive that ordered the troops, in part, "To wipe out all puppet administrative organs of the puppet Thiệu-Kỳ clique at all levels in the province, city and town down to every single hamlet."

On the same day, the Liberation Front radio announced, "We tell our compatriots that we are determined to topple the regime of the traitorous Thiệu-Kỳ clique and to punish and annihilate those who have been massacring and oppressing our compatriots... we ask our compatriots to... help us arrest all the cruel U.S. puppets."

=== Occupation ===
Foreign Service Officer Douglas Pike wrote that according to Vietcong documents captured during and after the siege, members of the provincial administration were to be taken out of the city, held, and punished for their "crimes against the Vietnamese people". The disposition of those who were previously in control of the city was carefully laid out, and the lists were detailed and extensive. Those in the Saigon-based-state police apparatus at all levels were to be rounded up and held outside the city. High civilian and military officials were also removed from the city to await the study of their individual cases.

Ordinary civil servants who worked for "the Saigon enemy" out of necessity but did not oppose the communists were destined for reeducation and later employment. Low-level civil servants who had at some point been involved in paramilitary activities were to be held for reeducation but not employed. There are documented cases of individuals who were executed by the Vietcong when they tried to hide or otherwise resisted during the early stages of Huế's occupation.

Within days of the capture, US Marine Corps (USMC), US Army, and ARVN units were dispatched to counterattack and recapture the city after weeks of fierce fighting during which the city and its outlying areas were exposed to repeated shelling and bombing. It was reported that during the attack by USMC and ARVN, North Vietnam's forces had rounded up the individuals whose names it had previously collected and had them executed or sent North for "reeducation."

Many people had taken sanctuary from the battle in a local church. Several hundred of them were ordered out to undergo indoctrination in the "liberated area" and told that they would be allowed to return home. After marching the group south 9 km, 20 of the people were separated, tried in a kangaroo court, found guilty, executed and buried. The others were taken across the river and turned over to a local communist unit in an exchange that even included written receipts. Douglas Pike noted "It is probable that the Commissar intended that their prisoners should be reeducated and returned, but with the turnover, matters passed from his control." Sometime in the following several weeks, the communists decided to kill the individuals under their control.

=== Eyewitness accounts ===
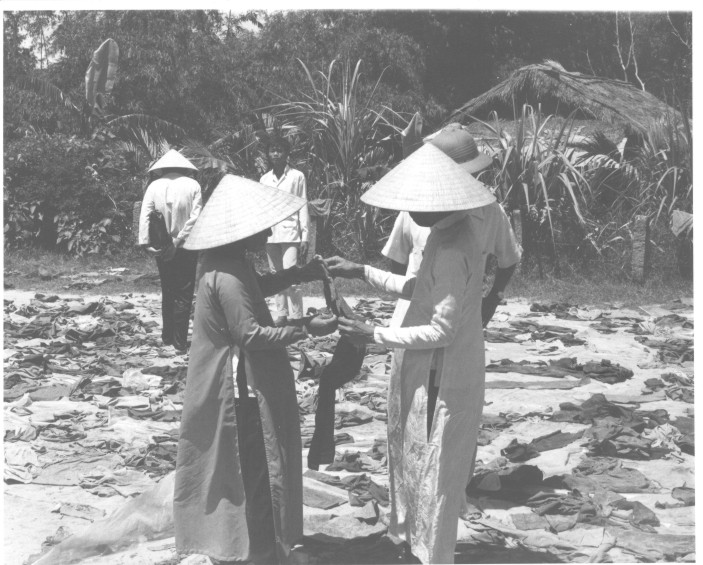
Searching – Bits of tattered clothing, sandals and slippers are examined by South Vietnamese women who lost relatives in the 1968 Tet massacre. The latest mass grave discovered in Huế yielded remains of 250 victims

Nguyễn Công Minh, the daughter of the Deputy Mayor of Huế, reported that her father, who was of old age, was arrested at his home in the beginning of the communist occupation three days after he ordered his children (including herself) and his wife to flee via the back of their house when communist troops first came knocking at their home. Upon telling the troops that he was Deputy Mayor of Huế and was set to retire in one year (1969), he was ordered to report to a camp for reeducation and to pack clothing and food sufficient for 10 days. He was never seen again, and his remains were never recovered. She recalled that in the search of her father's remains, she witnessed that many of the bodies she came across in the mass graves were found to be in a fetal position, with their hands tied behind their backs, and the back of the heads/skulls were smashed, indicating that they knelt on the ground prior to their deaths and they died due to blunt-force trauma to their heads.

In 1971, the journalist Don Oberdorfer's book, Tet!, documented some eyewitness accounts of what happened in Huế during the occupation. Pham Van Tuong, a part-time janitor for the Huế government information office who made it on the Vietcong list of "reactionaries" for working there, was hiding with his family as it hunted for him. When he was found with his 3-year-old daughter, 5-year-old son and two nephews, the Vietcong immediately gunned them all down, leaving their bodies on the street for the rest of the family to see.

Oberdorfer spent five days in late 1969 with Paul Vogle, an American professor of English at Huế University, to go through Huế to interview witnesses of the occupation. Oberdorfer classified all the killings into two categories: the planned execution of government officials and their families, political and civil servants, and collaborators with Americans, and those civilians not connected to the government who ran from questioning, who spoke harshly about the occupation, or who the occupiers believed "displayed a bad attitude" towards the occupiers.

Oberdorfer reported that on the fifth day of the Viet Cong occupation in the Catholic district of Huế, Phủ Cam, all able-bodied males over 15, approximately 400 boys and men, who took refuge in Phủ Cam Cathedral were taken away and killed. Some had been on the Vietcong's blacklist, some were of military age and some just looked prosperous. Oberdorfer interviewed Ho Ty, a Vietcong commander who took part in the advanced planning of a general uprising. He reported that Ty recounted that the Communist party "was particularly anxious to get those people at Phủ Cam.... The Catholics were considered particular enemies of ours." It was apparently that group whose remains were later found in the Da Mai Creek bed. The murders of 500 people at Da Mai were authorized by PRG command "on grounds that the victims had been traitors to the revolution."

Three professors, Professor Horst-Günther Krainick, Dr. Alois Alteköster, and Dr. Raimund Discher, who taught at the Huế University's Faculty of Medicine and were members of the West German Cultural Mission, along with Mrs. Elisabeth Krainick, were arrested and executed by North Vietnamese troops during their invasion of Huế in February 1968. On 5 April 1968, the bodies of the executed professors along with many Vietnamese civilians also executed, were discovered in mass graves near Huế.

Philip W. Manhard, a U.S. senior advisor in Huế province, was taken to a prisoner-of-war camp by the PAVN and held until 1973. Manhard recounted that during the PAVN's withdrawal from Huế, they summarily executed anyone in their custody who resisted being taken out of the city or who was too old, young, or frail to make the journey to the camp.

Two French priests, Fathers Urbain and Guy, were seen being led away and suffered a similar fate. Urbain's body was found buried alive, bound hand and foot. Guy, who was 48, was stripped of his cassock and forced to kneel down on the ground, where he was shot in the back of the head. He was in the same grave with Father Urbain and 18 others.

Captured in the home of Vietnamese friends, Stephen Miller of the U.S. Information Service was bound and shot in a field behind a Catholic seminary. Courtney Niles, an American civilian working for NBC International, was killed during an attack by communist forces while in the presence of U.S. soldiers.

Alje Vennema, a Dutch-Canadian doctor who lived in Huế and witnessed the battle and the massacre, wrote The Viet Cong Massacre at Huế in 1976. He recounts numerous stories of murders. A 48-year-old street vendor, Mrs. Nguyen Thi Lao, was "arrested on the main street. Her body was found at the school. Her arms had been bound and a rag stuffed into her mouth; there were no wounds to the body. She was probably buried alive." A 44-year-old bricklayer, Mr. Nguyen Ty, was "seized on February 2, 1968.... His body was found on March 1st; his hands were tied, and he had a bullet wound through his neck which had come out through the mouth." At Ap Dong Gi Tay "110 bodies were uncovered; again most had their hands tied and rags stuffed in their mouth. All of them were men, among them fifteen students, several military men, and civil servants, young and old." "Sometimes a whole family was eliminated, as was the case with the merchant, Mr. Nam Long, who together with his wife and five children was shot at home." "Mr. Phan Van Tuong, a laborer at the province headquarters, suffered a similar fate by being shot outside his house with four of his children."

Vennema listed 27 graves with a total of 2,397 bodies, most of which had been executed. He cited numerous eyewitness accounts of executions and described the condition of bodies found in the graves. Many had their hands tied behind their backs. Some were shot in the head. Some had rags stuffed in their mouths and had no evidence of wounds, apparently having been buried alive. Some had evidence of having been beaten. A few were identified as PAVN or VC troops killed during the battle.

Some graves were found purely by accident. A farmer working in his field tripped on a wire sticking out of the ground. He pulled on it to remove it and a skeletal hand popped out of the ground. Other graves were found when people noticed suspiciously green grass in sandy areas. The Da Mai Creek massacre was discovered after three Vietcong defected and told authorities about the murders. An ARVN soldier on patrol south of Huế noticed a wire sticking out of the ground. Thinking it was a booby trap, he very carefully worked to uncover it. He discovered the body of an old man, his hands tied together with the wire. Two days later, 130 bodies had been uncovered.

In another case,

...a squad with a death order entered the home of a prominent community leader and shot him, his wife, his married son and daughter-in-law, his young unmarried daughter, a male and female servant and their baby. The family cat was strangled; the family dog was clubbed to death; the goldfish scooped out of the fishbowl and tossed on the floor. When the Communists left, no life remained in the house.

An eyewitness, Nguyen Tan Chau, recounted how he was captured by communist troops and marched south with 29 other prisoners bound together, in three groups of ten. Chau managed to escape and hide in the darkness just before the others were executed. From there, he witnessed what happened next. The larger prisoners were separated into pairs, tied together back to back, and shot. The others were shot singly. All were dumped into two shallow graves, including those who had been wounded but were not dead.

=== Documents confirming the massacre ===
Captured Vietcong documents boasted that they "eliminated" thousands of enemy and "annihilated members of various reactionary political parties, henchmen, and wicked tyrants" in Huế. One regiment alone reported that it killed 1,000 people. Another report mentioned 2,867 killed. Yet another document boasted of over 3,000 killed. A further document listed 2,748 executions. A captured Vietcong enemy document, which numerous writers cited, including Guenter Lewy in his 1980 book America in Vietnam, and Peter Macdonald's 1993 book Giap, recorded that the communists had "eliminated 1,892 administrative personnel, 38 policemen, 790 tyrants", 2720 politically persecuted persons in all, during the communist occupation of the city.

The translation of an official Vietnamese campaign study of the Tet Offensive in Thừa Thiên–Huế Province released by the communists recognized that Vietcong cadres "hunted down and captured tyrants and Republic of Vietnam military and government personnel" and that "many nests of reactionaries [...] were killed." Hundreds of others "who owed blood debts were executed." Another official history from the communist side, "The Trị-Thiên-Huế Battlefield During the Victorious Resistance War Against the Americans to Save the Nation," recognized the widespread killings but claimed they were done by civilians who armed themselves and "rose up in a flood-tide, killing enemy thugs, eliminating traitors, and hunting down the enemy.... The people captured and punished many reactionaries, enemy thugs, and enemy secret agents." However, the word "eliminate" may be a mistranslation of the word "diệt," or "loại khỏi vòng chiến đấu," and instead actually mean "destroy" or "neutralize," as in neutralizing their administrative function and eliminating of their political influence by detention, as opposed to physical liquidation.

When Trương Như Tảng was appointed as Vietcong justice minister soon after Huế, he understood it to be a critical position because the massacre had "left us with a special need to address fears among the Southern people that a revolutionary victory would bring with it a bloodbath or reign of terror." That was because "large numbers of people had been executed" including "captured American soldiers and several other international people who were not combatants." According to Trạng, "discipline in Huế was seriously inadequate" and "fanatic young soldiers had indiscriminately shot people, and angry local citizens who supported the revolution had on various occasions taken justice into their own hands...." The massacre was "one of those terrible spontaneous tragedies that inevitably accompany war."

On 4 February, Radio Hanoi announced, "After one hour's fighting the Revolutionary Armed Forces occupied the residence of the puppet provincial Governor (in Huế), the prison and the offices of the puppet administration.... The Revolutionary Armed Forces punished most cruel agents of the enemy and seized control of the streets... rounded up and punished dozens of cruel agents and caused the enemy organs of control and oppression to crumble." On 14 February, the Thừa Thiên-Huế People's Revolutionary Committee issued a statement that read in part,

Concerned over the country's survival and their own fate, on 31 January 1968, the Thừa Thiên-Huế people rose up holding weapons in their hands, smashed the puppet ruling apparatus from the provincial to the village and hamlet levels, and completely liberated the rural areas and the city of Huế. The enemy has suffered disastrous defeats. A number of ringleaders of the puppet administration have surrendered to the people or have been arrested and have been detained by the revolutionary forces. Except for some localities and scattered guard posts which have not yet been liquidated, the Thừa Thiên-Huế puppet administration has basically disintegrated.

An entry in a captured communist document dated 22 February stated, "Troop proselyting by the VC/PAVN forces was not successful because the troops had to devote themselves to combat missions. Moreover, they were afraid of being discovered by the enemy. It was very difficult for them to handle POWs so they executed the policy of 'catch and kill.'" A 25 February captured communist document detailed some of the successes of the Special Action Company of the PAVN 6th Regiment. "We captured and exterminated thousands of people of the revolutionary network. From province to village we broke the enemy's administrative grip for the people to rise."

A report written immediately after the battle by a political officer of the People's Revolutionary Party listed 2,826 "administrative personnel, nationalist political party members, 'tyrants' and policemen that were killed by their troops."

Another document, undated, written by a senior political officer and marked "ABSOLUTE SECRET", was entitled "Information On the Victory of Our Armed Forces in Huế from 31 January to 23 March 1968;" it was captured by the US 1st Cavalry Division on 25 April 1968 and reported on the results of the political operation.

We also killed one member of the Dai Viet Party Committee, one Senator of South Viet-Nam, 50 Quoc Dan Dang party members, six Dai Viet Party members, thirteen Can Lao Nhan Vi Party members, three captains, four 1st lieutenants, and liberated 35 hamlets with 32,000 people.... We eliminated 1,892 administrative personnel, 38 policemen, 790 tyrants, six captains, two first lieutenants, 20 second lieutenants, and many NCOs.

The same document contained a passage that read:

The people joined our soldiers in their search for tyrants, reactionaries and spies. For instance, Mrs. Xuan followed our soldiers to show the houses of the tyrants she knew, although she had only six days before given birth to a child.

In March 1968, in the official Hanoi press, the North reported:

Actively combining their efforts with those of the People's Liberation Armed Forces and population, other self-defense and armed units of the city of Huế arrested and called to surrender the surviving functionaries of the puppet administration and officers and men of the puppet army who were skulking. Die-hard cruel agents were punished.

A 6 March document written by a Vietcong sapper unit commander recounted that his unit "participated in the killing of tyrants and the digging of trenches" A 13 March 1968 entry in captured documents reviewed the successes of the attack on Huế. "Enormous victory: We annihilated more than 3,000 tyrannical puppet army and government administrative personnel, including the Deputy Province Chief of Thừa Thiên." A report written by the commander of the 6th Regiment on 30 March stated that they had captured thousands of "local administrative personnel, puppet troops, and cruel tyrants" and successfully "annihilated members of various reactionary political parties, henchmen, and wicked tyrants." It also stated that they had "killed 1,000 local administrative personnel, spies and cruel tyrants."

On 26 April 1968, Hanoi, reacting to the discovery of graves in Huế, announced that the people murdered by their troops were "hooligan lackeys who had incurred blood debts of the Huế compatriots and who were annihilated by the Front's Armed Forces in the early spring of 1968." On 27 April 1969, Radio Hanoi criticized authorities in Huế and South Vietnam:

In order to cover up their cruel acts, the puppet administration in Huế recently played the farce of setting up a so-called committee for the search for burial sites of the hooligan lackeys who had owed blood debts to the Tri-Thien-Huế compatriots and who were annihilated by the Southern Armed Forces and people in early Mau Than spring.

A cadre diary captured by 1st Cavalry Division troops contained an entry that read:

The entire puppet administrative system from hamlet to province was destroyed or disintegrated. More than 3,000 persons were killed. The enemy could never reorganize or make up for his failure. Although he could immediately use inexperienced elements as replacements, they were good for nothing.

In December 1968, the Huế City People's Revolutionary Party Central Committee released a summary of the party's accomplishments during Tet. The summary included the following statement: "Thousands of tyrants were killed. Many reactionary factions and organizations were exterminated."

The same month, Don Oberdorfer reported:

Ho Ty was arrested by the government police on Sept. 4 this year. At the time of his arrest, he was party secretary for a section of Huế city...Ho Ty reported that the part of the plan from higher headquarters was to destroy the government machinery of Huế and the people who made it work.... He said the killings were planned and executed by a separate group in charge of security.

In 1987, at a Hanoi conference to discuss the history of the Tet offensive, Colonel General Tran Van Quang, one of the commanders of the Huế operation, assessed the strengths and weaknesses of his forces and cited as one of their strengths:

We resolutely carried out the orders and fulfilled the requirements set out for us by the High Command. We motivated our cadre, soldiers, and the civilian population through the use of the slogans, 'Tri-Thien fights for Tri-Thien and for the entire nation,' and 'Heroically and resolutely conduct attacks and uprisings.'

In February 1988, Vietnamese communist leaders admitted "mistakes" were made in Huế. Col Nguyen Quoc Khanh, commander of part of the forces that took over Huế stated, "There was no case of killing civilians purposefully.... Those civilians who were killed were killed accidentally, in cross fire." However, he admitted "some rank and file soldiers may have committed individual mistakes." However, in an internal document discussing the 1968 Tet offensive in Hue, General (Tổng) Hồ Trung wrote, referring to the Giá Hơi section: "These forces hunted down and killed enemy thugs, reactionaries, and puppet policemen" and that they "cleaned out.... nests of Catholic reactionaries."

== Discovery ==
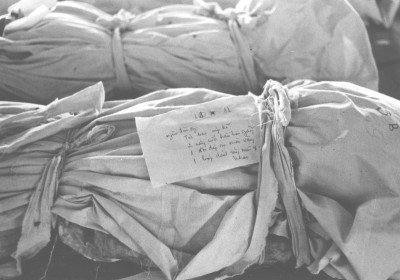
Label on the shrouded remains of a Tet Offensive victim describing teeth, color of hair, footwear, and other possessions found with the body.

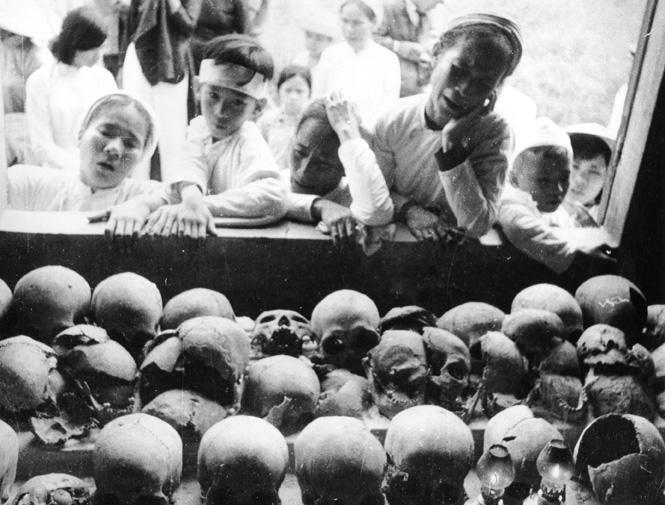
Families mourning at Khe Đá Mài

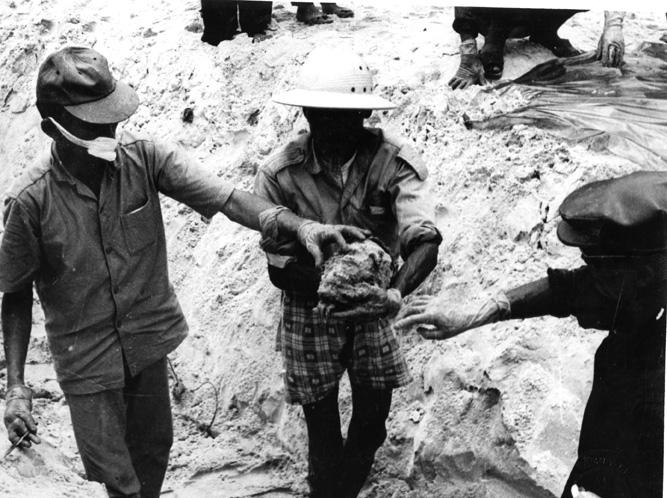
Uncovering the corpses at Khe Đá Mài

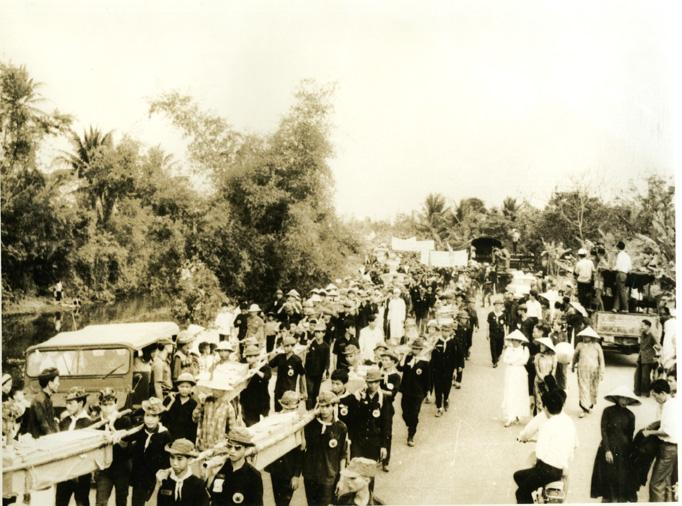
Transporting the victims' corpses

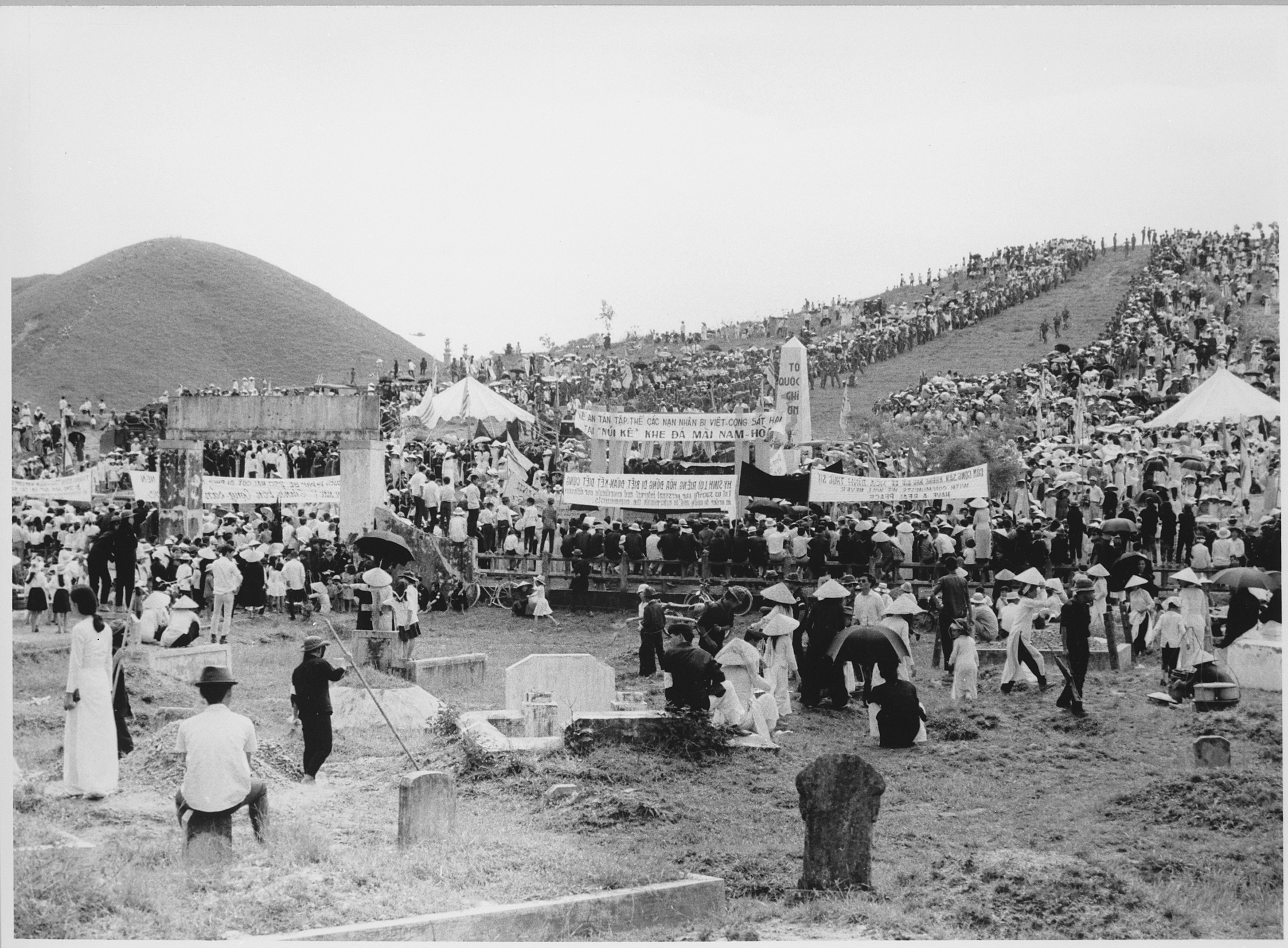
Funeral services for the victims

A first summary was published for the U.S. Mission in Vietnam by Douglas Pike, then working as a Foreign Service Officer for the U.S. Information Agency in 1970. Pike identified three distinct phases for the executions in Huế. In a report published in 1970, The Viet Cong Strategy of Terror, Pike wrote that at least half of the bodies unearthed in Huế revealed clear evidence of "atrocity killings: to include hands wired behind backs, rags stuffed in mouths, bodies contorted but without wounds (indicating burial alive)." Pike concluded that the killings were done by local Vietcong cadres and were the result of "a decision rational and justifiable in the Communist mind." The three phases are as follows:

- Phase one was a series of kangaroo court trials of local ARVN officials. The highly publicized trials lasted anywhere from 5 to 10 minutes and the accused were always found guilty of "crimes against the people."
- Phase two was implemented when the communists thought that they could hold the city long-term and was a campaign of "social reconstruction" along Maoist dogmatic lines. Those who the communists believed to be counter-revolutionaries were singled out. Catholics, intellectuals, prominent businessmen, and other "imperialist lackeys" were targeted in order to "build a new social order."
- The last phase began when it became evident that the communists could not hold the city, and it was designed to "leave no witnesses." Anyone who could identify individual Vietcong members who participated in the occupation was to be killed and their bodies hidden.

After the Battle of Huế, between 1968 and 1969 a total of almost 2,800 bodies were recovered from mass graves, with 4 major mass grave finds.

- A few months after the battle, about 1,200 civilian bodies were found in 18 hastily concealed mass graves.
- A second major group of graves were discovered in the first 7 months of 1969. In February 1968, a list of 428 names of people identified from the recovered bones was released by local authorities.
- In September 1969, three communist defectors confessed to the 101st Airborne Division intelligence officers that they had witnessed several hundred people being killed in a 100-yard area at Da Mai Creek bed (about 10 miles south of Huế).
- In November 1969, another major mass grave was found at Phu Thu Salt Flats, near the fishing village of Lương Viện, Vinh Hưng commune, Phú Lộc provincial district, 10 miles east of Huế and halfway between the cities of Huế and Đà Nẵng.

== Disputes and denials ==
In Bùi Tín's 2002 memoir, From Enemy to Friend: A North Vietnamese perspective on the war, the former PAVN Colonel acknowledged that executions of civilians had occurred in Huế. However, he added that under the intensity of the American bombardment, discipline of the troops disintegrated. The "units from the north" had been "told that Huế was the stronghold of feudalism, a bed of reactionaries, the breeding ground of Cần Lao Party loyalists who remained true to the memory of former South Vietnamese president Ngô Đình Diệm and of Nguyễn Văn Thiệu's Democracy Party." Tin explained that over 10,000 prisoners were taken at Huế, with the most important of them sent to North Vietnam for imprisonment. When U.S. Marines launched their counterattack to retake the city, communist troops were instructed to move the prisoners with the retreating troops. According to Tín, in the "panic of retreat," the company and battalion commanders shot their prisoners "to ensure the safety of the retreat."

Marilyn B. Young disputes the "official figures" of executions at Huế. While acknowledging that there were executions, she cites freelance journalist Len Ackland, who was at Huế and estimated the number to be somewhere between 300 and 400.

Ngo Vinh Long claims that 710 people were killed by the communists. In an interview he stated, "Yeah, there was a total of 710 persons killed in the Huế area, from my research, not as many as five thousand, six thousand, or whatever the Americans claimed at that time, and not as few as four hundred as people like some of the people in the peace movement here claim...."

The Italian journalist Oriana Fallaci reported, "In the last few days the Vietcong lost their heads and did nothing but make reprisals, kill, punish". However, citing a French priest to whom she spoke in Huế, she also claimed that the death toll of up to 8,000 included deaths by American bombardment, and at least 200 people, and perhaps as many as 1,100, who were killed following the liberation of Huế by the US and ARVN forces. Stanley Karnow wrote that the bodies of those executed by South Vietnamese teams were thrown into common graves. The historian David Hunt posited that Douglas Pike's study for the U.S. Mission was "by any definition, a work of propaganda." In 1988, Pike said that he had earlier been engaged in a conscious "effort to discredit the Vietcong."

In a letter to the editor of The New York Times, the historian Gareth Porter, who is also known for his Cambodian genocide denial, stated that there was little evidence that the communists carried out more than "several hundred" political executions and revenge killings in Huế, while the U.S. official estimate maintains that over 2,800 bodies were "victims of Communist executions." He alleged that the site of one set of mass graves was also the site of a major battle in which some 250 communist troops were reported killed in U.S air strikes and that Saigon's minister of health, after visiting burial sites, said the bodies could have been communist soldiers killed in battle. He dismissed Pike's claim that there were communist blacklists of students and intellectuals to be killed as unsupported by interviews and captured communist documents.

The historian James Willbanks concluded, "We may never know what really happened at Huế, but it is clear that mass executions did occur." According to Stanley Karnow, "Balanced accounts have made it clear, however, that the Communist butchery at Huế did take place—perhaps on an even larger scale than reported during the war." Ben Kiernan's 2017 history of Vietnam states that "thousands" were killed at Huế in "possibly the largest atrocity of the war."

== Legacy ==
Reports of the massacre had a profound impact on the South Vietnamese for many years after the Tet Offensive, with an anticipation of a bloodbath following any North Vietnamese takeover, like the one in Huế. Novelist James Jones, in a New York Times article wrote, "Whatever else they accomplished, the Huế massacres effectively turned the bulk of the South Vietnamese against the Northern Communists. In South Vietnam, wherever one went, from Can Tho in the delta to Tay Ninh to Kontum in the north, and of course in Huế, the 1968 Tet massacres were still being talked about in 1973." For their part, left-leaning scholars have since commented that the massacre was a rare propaganda coup during the unpopular war in Vietnam, especially as it allowed Richard Nixon's government to counteract the public outrage derived from the American-perpetrated Mỹ Lai massacre that would take place a few weeks later during that same year.

Anticipation of a bloodbath was a major factor in the widespread panic and chaos across South Vietnam when North Vietnam executed their 1975 Spring Offensive, and the panic culminated in the disintegration and defeat of South Vietnamese military forces, and the fall of the Republic of Vietnam on 30 April 1975. Today, the massacre remains unrecognized and entirely ignored in the Vietnamese communist government's War Remnants Museum in Ho Chi Minh City.

== See also ==
- List of massacres in Vietnam
- Viet Cong and People's Army of Vietnam use of terror in the Vietnam War
- Red Terror (disambiguation)
