= Robert V. Keeley =

American diplomat (1929-2015)

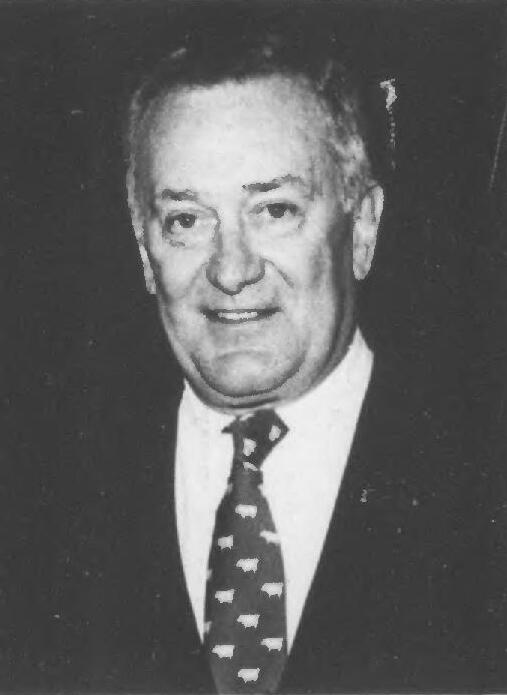

United States Ambassador to Mauritius
- In office June 23, 1976 – September 17, 1978
- President: Gerald Ford; Jimmy Carter
- Preceded by: Philip W. Manhard
- Succeeded by: Samuel Rhea Gammon III

United States Ambassador to Zimbabwe
- In office May 23, 1980 – February 20, 1984
- President: Jimmy Carter; Ronald Reagan
- Preceded by: none
- Succeeded by: David Charles Miller, Jr.

United States Ambassador to Greece
- In office 1985–1989
- President: Ronald Reagan
- Preceded by: Monteagle Stearns
- Succeeded by: Michael G. Sotirhos

Personal details
- Born: Robert Vossler Keeley; September 4, 1929 Beirut, Lebanon, France
- Died: January 9, 2015 (aged 85) Washington, D.C., U.S.
- Spouse: Louise Benedict Schoonmaker
- Children: 2; Michal, Chris
- Profession: Diplomat

Military service
- Branch/service: United States Coast Guard
- Years of service: 1953–55

Robert Vossler Keeley (September 4, 1929 – January 9, 2015) had a 34-year career in the Foreign Service of the United States, from 1956 to 1989. He served three times as Ambassador: to Greece (1985–89), Zimbabwe (1980–84), and Mauritius (1976–78). In 1978–80 he was Deputy Assistant Secretary of State for African Affairs, in charge of southern and eastern Africa.

Earlier in his career he had assignments as Deputy Chief of Mission in Cambodia (1974–75) and Uganda (1971–73), and as Deputy Director of the Interagency Task Force for the Indochina Refugees (1975–76). His other foreign postings were as Political Officer in Jordan, Mali, and Greece. In Washington he served as Congo (Zaire) desk officer, and as alternate director for East Africa. At his retirement in 1989 Keeley held the rank of Career Minister.

The same year he received the Christian Herter Award from the American Foreign Service Association for "extraordinary accomplishment involving initiative, integrity, intellectual courage, and creative dissent." At other stages in his career he earned the Superior Honor Award (for Cambodia), a Presidential Citation (for the Refugee Task Force), and a Presidential Distinguished Service Award (for Zimbabwe). In 1985 he was elected President of the American Foreign Service Association.

From November 1990 to January 1995 Ambassador Keeley served as President of the Middle East Institute in Washington, a private, non-profit educational and cultural institution founded in 1946 to foster greater understanding in the United States of the countries of the Middle East region from Morocco to Central Asia.

== Early life, education, and military service ==
Keeley was born in Beirut, Lebanon, France, in 1929, where his late father, American diplomat James Hugh Keeley, Jr., was serving as the American Consul. Keeley was educated in Canada, Greece, Belgium, and the United States. He graduated summa cum laude from Princeton University in 1951, with a major in English literature under the Special Program in the Humanities. His senior thesis was a novel with a critical preface, the first such "creative writing" undergraduate dissertation authorized. His brother Edmund Keeley also graduated from Princeton. Robert continued with graduate work at Princeton in English, and later, while in the Foreign Service, he held graduate fellowships at Stanford and at Princeton in public and international affairs. He did his military service in the U.S. Coast Guard during the Korean War (1953–55) as commanding officer of an 83-foot patrol boat.

== Family ==
Keeley was married to the former Louise Benedict Schoonmaker and they had two children. They were married June 23, 1951, in Kingston, Ulster County, New York. Their daughter, Michal Mathilde Keeley, a 1976 graduate of Princeton, is a retired editor. Their son, Christopher John (Chris), earned a Bachelor of Fine Arts in photography from the Corcoran School of Art in 1988 and a Master's in Social Work from Catholic University in 1997, and is an artist and licensed social worker working for the D.C. Government in child welfare services. Louise S. Keeley was the niece of Louise Burt Schoonmaker, who married William Edwin Chilton, the son of United States Senator from West Virginia William E. Chilton. Before marrying Robert, while attending Smith College, Louise was "a steady companion of writer J.D. Salinger during the time he was writing 'Catcher in the Rye.'"

== Affiliations ==
Keeley's affiliations were the Cosmos Club of Washington, the American Foreign Service Association, Diplomatic and Consular Officers Retired, the Princeton Club of Washington, the Washington Institute of Foreign Affairs, the Literary Society, and the American Academy of Diplomacy.

== Current work ==
After retiring from the Foreign Service, Keeley was Chairman of the Board of Directors for the Council for the National Interest. In addition he worked as a freelance writer, lecturer, and consultant, based in Washington. His interests were not confined to foreign affairs, but extended to issues of domestic politics, economics, and social policy. He wrote two memoirs covering portions of his career: Uganda under the rule of Idi Amin Dada (1971–73) and Greece under "the Colonels" (1966–68), the latter titled The Colonels’ Coup and the American Embassy: A Diplomat’s View of the Breakdown of Democracy in Cold War Greece. One chapter of the Uganda book has been published in "Embassies Under Siege: Personal Accounts by Diplomats on the Front Line" (Institute for the Study of Diplomacy, Georgetown University, Brassey's, 1995).

In 1995 Ambassador Keeley founded the Five and Ten Press Inc., a publishing company whose purpose was to publish in inexpensive format (booklets and pamphlets) original articles, essays, and other short works of fiction and nonfiction rejected or ignored by the media and mainstream publishers. The press was incorporated in the District of Columbia in February 1996. The name comes from the intention to price the products of the press at between five and ten dollars a copy. The press's first publication was a pamphlet entitled D.C. Governance: It's Always Been a Matter of Race and Money, issued in December 1995, and the second was a booklet with the title Annals of Investing: Steve Forbes vs. Warren Buffett, published in March 1996. A third, The File: A Princeton Memoir. was published in May 1996. All three had the same author: the publisher, whose business card identified his profession as "Consulting Iconoclast." In October 1996 the Press began to sell its publications on a subscription basis and mostly broke even financially.

In 2000 Keeley contributed a chapter on CIA-Foreign Service relations to the book National Insecurity-U.S. Intelligence After the Cold War, a work recommending reforms of the CIA, published by Temple University Press for the Center for International Policy. Also in 2000 Keeley edited a book for the American Academy of Diplomacy entitled First Line of Defense-Ambassadors, Embassies and American Interests Abroad that advocated greater reliance on and better funding for American diplomacy in conflict resolution and protecting our national security. Keeley also edited two yearbooks for the 50th reunion of Princeton's Class of 1951 in the year 2001. In 2010 Keeley published the book The Colonels' Coup and the American Embassy: A Diplomat's View of the Breakdown of Democracy in Cold War Greece. Keeley died after an apparent stroke in January 2015.

In 2004, Keeley was among 27 retired diplomats and military commanders who publicly said the administration of President George W. Bush did not understand the world and was unable to handle "in either style or substance" the responsibilities of global leadership. On June 16, 2004 the Diplomats and Military Commanders for Change issued a statement against the Iraq War.

Diplomatic posts
Preceded by Philip W. Manhard	United States Ambassador to Mauritius; 1976–1978	Succeeded by Samuel Rhea Gammon III
Preceded by none	United States Ambassador to Zimbabwe; 1980–1984	Succeeded by David Charles Miller, Jr.
Preceded by Monteagle Stearns	United States Ambassador to Greece; 1985–1989	Succeeded by Michael G. Sotirhos
