= List of ambassadors of the United States to Sierra Leone =

Ambassador of the United States to Sierra Leone
- Seal of the United States Department of State

- Flag of a United States ambassador

- Incumbent; Meghan Moore; Chargé d'affaires since July 23, 2026
- Nominator: The president of the United States
- Inaugural holder: Herbert Reiner as Chargé d'Affaires ad interim
- Formation: April 27, 1961
- Website: U.S. Embassy - Freetown

The United States ambassador to Sierra Leone is the official representative of the government of the United States to the government of Sierra Leone.

== Ambassadors ==
Name	Title	Appointed	Presented credentials	Terminated mission	Notes
Herbert Reiner – Career FSO	Chargé d'Affaires ad interim	April 27, 1961	N/A	1961	
A. S. J. Carnahan – Political appointee	Ambassador Extraordinary and Plenipotentiary	May 11, 1961	June 9, 1961	July 13, 1963	
Andrew V. Corry - Career FSO	Ambassador Extraordinary and Plenipotentiary	January 29, 1964	February 25, 1964	May 19, 1967	
Robert Graham Miner - Career FSO	Ambassador Extraordinary and Plenipotentiary	November 7, 1967	December 7, 1967	June 16, 1971	
Clinton Louis Olson - Career FSO	Ambassador Extraordinary and Plenipotentiary	June 27, 1972	July 4, 1972	November 11, 1974	
Michael Anthony Samuels - Political appointee	Ambassador Extraordinary and Plenipotentiary	December 20, 1974	February 14, 1975	May 25, 1977	
John Andrew Linehan - Career FSO	Ambassador Extraordinary and Plenipotentiary	June 24, 1977	August 30, 1977	May 9, 1980	
Theresa Ann Healy - Career FSO	Ambassador Extraordinary and Plenipotentiary	August 27, 1980	September 18, 1980	July 13, 1983	
Arthur Winston Lewis - Career FSO	Ambassador Extraordinary and Plenipotentiary	May 17, 1983	August 17, 1983	June 5, 1986	
Cynthia Shepard Perry - Political appointee	Ambassador Extraordinary and Plenipotentiary	June 16, 1986	July 16, 1986	August 30, 1989	
Johnny Young – Career FSO	Ambassador Extraordinary and Plenipotentiary	October 10, 1989	November 29, 1989	July 23, 1992	
Lauralee M. Peters - Career FSO	Ambassador Extraordinary and Plenipotentiary	June 15, 1992	October 8, 1992	July 6, 1995	
John Lewis Hirsch - Career FSO	Ambassador Extraordinary and Plenipotentiary	August 14, 1995	September 13, 1995	June 17, 1998	
Joseph Melrose - Career FSO	Ambassador Extraordinary and Plenipotentiary	October 22, 1998	November 20, 1998	September 10, 2001	
Peter R. Chaveas - Career FSO	Ambassador Extraordinary and Plenipotentiary	July 12, 2001	October 12, 2001	May 24, 2004	
Thomas Neil Hull - Career FSO	Ambassador Extraordinary and Plenipotentiary	May 12, 2004	August 19, 2004	August 27, 2007	
June Carter Perry - Career FSO	Ambassador Extraordinary and Plenipotentiary	July 7, 2007	October 8, 2007	January 2, 2009	
Michael S. Owen – Career FSO	Ambassador Extraordinary and Plenipotentiary	August 9, 2010	September 30, 2010	October 2, 2013	
John Hoover - Career FSO	Ambassador Extraordinary and Plenipotentiary	September 12, 2014	December 4, 2014	July 2, 2017	
Maria Brewer - Career FSO	Ambassador Extraordinary and Plenipotentiary	August 3, 2017	October 5, 2017	February 22, 2021	
David Dale Reimer - Career FSO	Ambassador Extraordinary and Plenipotentiary	December 22, 2020	March 24, 2021	August 24, 2023	
Bryan David Hunt - Career FSO	Ambassador Extraordinary and Plenipotentiary	July 27, 2023	September 11, 2023	September 17, 2025	
Jared M. Yancey - Career FSO	Chargé d'affaires ad interim	September 18, 2025		July 22, 2026	
Meghan Moore - Career FSO	Chargé d'affaires ad interim	July 23, 2026		Present	

== See also ==
- Sierra Leone – United States relations
- Foreign relations of Sierra Leone
- Ambassadors of the United States
