= Robert Keeley =

Robert Keeley is the name of:

- Robert V. Keeley (1929–2015), former United States Ambassador to Greece, Zimbabwe, and Mauritius
- Robert Keeley (comedian) (1793–1869), English comedian
- Robert Keeley (instrument maker), American effects pedal producer

== See also ==
- Bob Keely (1909–2001), American baseball coach
