= John L. Hirsch =

American diplomat (born 1936)

United States Ambassador to Sierra Leone
- In office September 13, 1995 – June 17, 1998
- President: Bill Clinton
- Preceded by: Lauralee M. Peters
- Succeeded by: Joseph Melrose

Personal details
- Born: John Lewis Hirsch; 1936 (age 89–90)
- Education: Columbia University (BA); University of Wisconsin (PhD)
- Profession: Diplomat

John Lewis Hirsch (born 1936) is an American career diplomat. He served as the United States Ambassador to Sierra Leone from 1995 to 1998.

== Biography ==
Hirsch graduated from Columbia University with a BA in American studies in 1957 and his PhD in European history from the University of Wisconsin in 1965. He was a Fulbright scholar from 1962 to 1963 and studied in Turin, Italy.

He served as chargé d'affaires to Somalia in 1986, and Consul General in Johannesburg, South Africa from 1990 to 1993.

He also worked as Political Adviser to the Commander of UNITAF, General Robert Johnston, and as Deputy to President George H. W. Bush's Special Envoy, Ambassador Robert Oakley from 1992 to 1993. He is the author, with Oakley, of the book Somalia and Operation Restore Hope, published by the United States Institute of Peace. The book has been lauded by Los Angeles Times as one of the two most important postmortems written since the United Nations dismantled its mission to Somalia.

Hirsch was appointed ambassador to Sierra Leone on August 14, 1995, and served in the post from September 13, 1995, to June 17, 1998.

In 1998, he joined the International Peace Academy as vice president following the completion of a 32-year career in the United States Foreign Service. He became senior fellow of the academy (renamed International Peace Institute) in 2001. Between 2000 and 2001, he was the Director of the International Fellows Program at Columbia University's School of International and Public Affairs.

In 2005, he joined Senator James Sasser and Ambassador Patricia M. Byrne to oppose the nomination of John Bolton to be the United States Ambassador to the United Nations.
