= Harold W. Geisel =

American politician (born 1947)

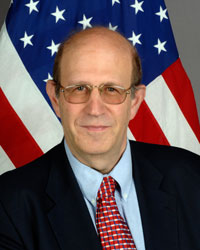

Inspector General of the Department of State
- In office June 2, 2008 – September 30, 2013
- President: George W. Bush; Barack Obama
- Preceded by: Howard Krongard
- Succeeded by: Steve A. Linick

United States Ambassador to Seychelles
- In office August 29, 1996 – May 27, 1999
- President: Bill Clinton
- Preceded by: Brent E. Blaschke
- Succeeded by: Mark W. Erwin

United States Ambassador to Mauritius
- In office August 13, 1996 – July 27, 1999
- President: Bill Clinton
- Preceded by: Leslie M. Alexander
- Succeeded by: Mark W. Erwin

Personal details
- Born: May 11, 1947 (age 79) Chicago, Illinois
- Education: Johns Hopkins University; University of Virginia

Harold Geisel (born May 11, 1947) is an American diplomat. He served as Inspector General for the U.S. Department of State from June 2, 2008, to September 30, 2013.

== Career ==
Geisel joined the department in 1970, completing tours as management or administrative officer in Brussels, Oslo, Bern, and Bamako, and as Consul General in Durban, South Africa. From 1986 to 1993, he served as management counselor at U.S. Embassies in Rome, Bonn, and Moscow. He returned to the department in 1993 as Executive Assistant to the Under Secretary of State for Management, where he supervised the creation of a worldwide process for allocating information technology resources. In 1994, he was assigned as Acting Inspector General of the State Department, pending appointment of a new Inspector General. He held the position of Deputy Assistant Secretary of State for Information Management, from 1995 to 1996, during which he was responsible for some 2,000 employees and directed the development of the Department's first IT strategic plan. He returned abroad in 1996, serving as Ambassador to the Comoros, Mauritius and Seychelles until 1999, and as a senior negotiator, leading discussions with foreign governments on base access and defense cost burden-sharing from 1999 to 2000.

== Background ==
Geisel has a bachelor's degree in Liberal Arts from Johns Hopkins University and his master's degree in finance from the University of Virginia.

== Bibliography ==
- "Testimony Of Harold W. Geisel Deputy Inspector General Office Of Inspector General U.S. Department Of State And The Broadcasting Board Of Governors" (PDF).
