= Penne Percy Korth =

American diplomat (1942–2026)

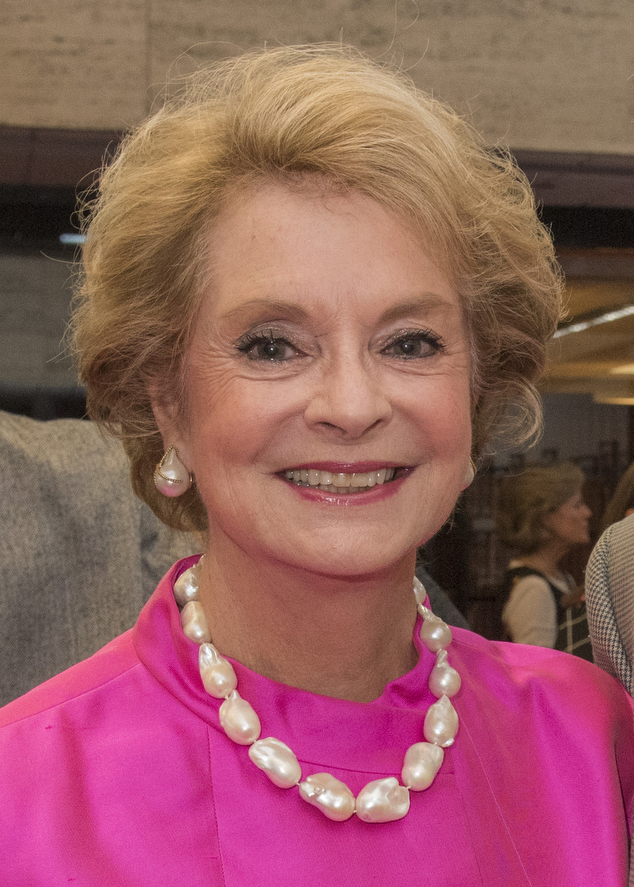
- Peacock in 2016

United States Ambassador to Mauritius
- In office December 6, 1989 – November 19, 1992
- President: George H. W. Bush
- Preceded by: Ronald D. Palmer
- Succeeded by: Leslie M. Alexander

Personal details
- Born: Penne Percy; November 3, 1942 Hattiesburg, Mississippi, U.S.
- Died: 30 June 2026 (aged 83) Fort Worth, Texas, U.S.
- Party: Republican
- Spouses: Fritz-Alan Korth (divorced) Andrew Peacock (m. 2002; died 2021)
- Children: Three
- Profession: Diplomat

Penne Percy Korth Peacock (November 3, 1942 – June 30, 2026) was an American diplomat, executive, and socialite. She graduated from the University of Texas in 1964 with a B.A.

She was a commissioner of the U.S. Advisory Commission on Public Diplomacy. Nominated in 1997, Korth previously served as Ambassador to Mauritius from 1989 to 1992. In 1993, Korth co-founded Firestone and Korth Ltd., a corporate consulting and events management firm in Washington, D.C.

Korth Peacock served on the Boards of Chevy Chase Bank, the Council of American Ambassadors, Meridian International Center, the Van Cliburn Foundation, the Marjorie Merriweather Post Foundation of DC, and the Association for Diplomatic Studies and Training. She was also Vice Chairman of the Washington Round Table of the Center for Strategic and International Studies (CSIS).

== Ambassadorship ==
Korth was nominated officially by President George H. W. Bush on August 4, 1989, and presented her credentials as ambassador to Mauritius on December 6, 1989. She succeeded Ronald D. Palmer. At the time she most recently served as co-chair of the American Bicentennial Presidential Inauguration, 1988-1989. Since 1986, Korth has been the senior Washington associate and client liaison and representative of the trust and estate division of Sotheby's. She was relieved of the position on November 19, 1992.

== Public diplomacy ==
In late 2005, the Advisory Commission published its annual report, giving strong recommendations and guidance on the future of U.S. public diplomacy. The group states that in the short term, a central goal is to establish platforms for cross-cultural dialogue, noting that two-way communication is critical to fostering a sense of shared values and trust. The report also provides recommendations on improving long-term communications, including the development of virtual centers for cultural exchange and the establishment of new English language initiatives. The commission's conclusions highlight the increasing importance of modernizing communications in under-developed nations, providing a critical link for the West to engage its world audience.

== Family ==
Korth originally married Fritz-Alan Korth and divorced with three children.

Korth then married the former Australian Liberal Opposition leader and Foreign Affairs minister Andrew Peacock in 2002, after a long-time companionship. Peacock, then 63, met Korth, then 59, at the time the former Texas beauty queen was ambassador to Mauritius, and while he was the Australian Ambassador to the United States from 1997 to 1999. Peacock, who was president of Boeing Australia and lived in Sydney, had only this to say about his third wedding: "It is a very happy occasion."

Korth Peacock and Andrew Peacock resided together in Austin, Texas until Peacock's death on April 16, 2021, at the age of 82. Five years later, Korth Peacock died in Fort Worth, Texas on June 30, 2026, at the age of 83.

== Publications, articles, and commentary ==
- Minutes – Commission Meeting Jan. 2006
- 2005 Report of the Advisory Commission on Public Diplomacy

Diplomatic posts
Preceded by Ronald D. Palmer	United States Ambassador to Mauritius; 1989–1992	Succeeded by Leslie M. Alexander
