= George Roberts Andrews =

American diplomat

United States Ambassador to Mauritius
- In office November 7, 1983 – August 16, 1986
- President: Ronald Reagan
- Preceded by: Robert C. F. Gordon
- Succeeded by: Ronald D. Palmer

Personal details
- Born: February 26, 1932 Havana, Cuba
- Died: April 11, 2010 (aged 78)
- Profession: Diplomat

George Roberts Andrews (February 26, 1932 – April 11, 2010) was an American diplomat, serving as ambassador to Mauritius.

Andrews graduated from Princeton University (B.A., 1953) and the Universite de Strasbourg in France (M.A., 1954). He was born February 26, 1932, in Havana, Cuba, of American parents.

Andrews entered the United States Foreign Service in 1954 as consular officer in Hamburg. He then served in Paris as a consular officer from 1956–1958, and political officer from 1958 - 1959. In the U.S. State Department he was a personnel officer from 1959–1962 and desk officer for Belgium and Luxembourg (1962–1964).

He was political officer in Stockholm from 1964–1967, chief of the political section in Dakar (1967–1970), chargé d'affaires in Conakry (1970), and consul general in Strasbourg (1970–1971). In 1971 until 1974 he was Deputy Assistant and Deputy Chief of the Mission in Guatemala from 1974 - 1978. He attended the executive seminar in national and international affairs at the Foreign Service Institute from 1978 - 1979. In 1979 - 1983 he was chief of senior officers personnel in the Bureau of Personnel in the Department.

He was a career member of the Senior Foreign Service, with a Class of Minister-Counselor. His foreign languages include French, Spanish, German, and Swedish.

Diplomatic posts
Preceded by Robert C. F. Gordon	United States Ambassador to Mauritius; 1983–1986	Succeeded by Ronald D. Palmer
