= Theresa Ann Healy =

American ambassador

Theresa Ann Healy (1932–2016) was the first female American ambassador to Sierra Leone, serving from 1980 until 1983. Healy was a career Foreign Service Officer from 1955 until her retirement in 1995, serving in Naples, Milan, and Bern before her ambassadorship.

Healy was born on July 14, 1932, in New York City to Anthony and Mary Healy. She attended Catholic schools, eventually graduating from St. John's University in 1954. She joined the Foreign Service the following year. In addition to her overseas assignments, she also served multiple tours of duty at the State Department, including as an intelligence research specialist and economist.

Diplomatic posts
Preceded by John Linehan	United States Ambassador to Sierra Leone; 1980–1983	Succeeded by Arthur Lewis
