= David Dale Reimer =

American diplomat

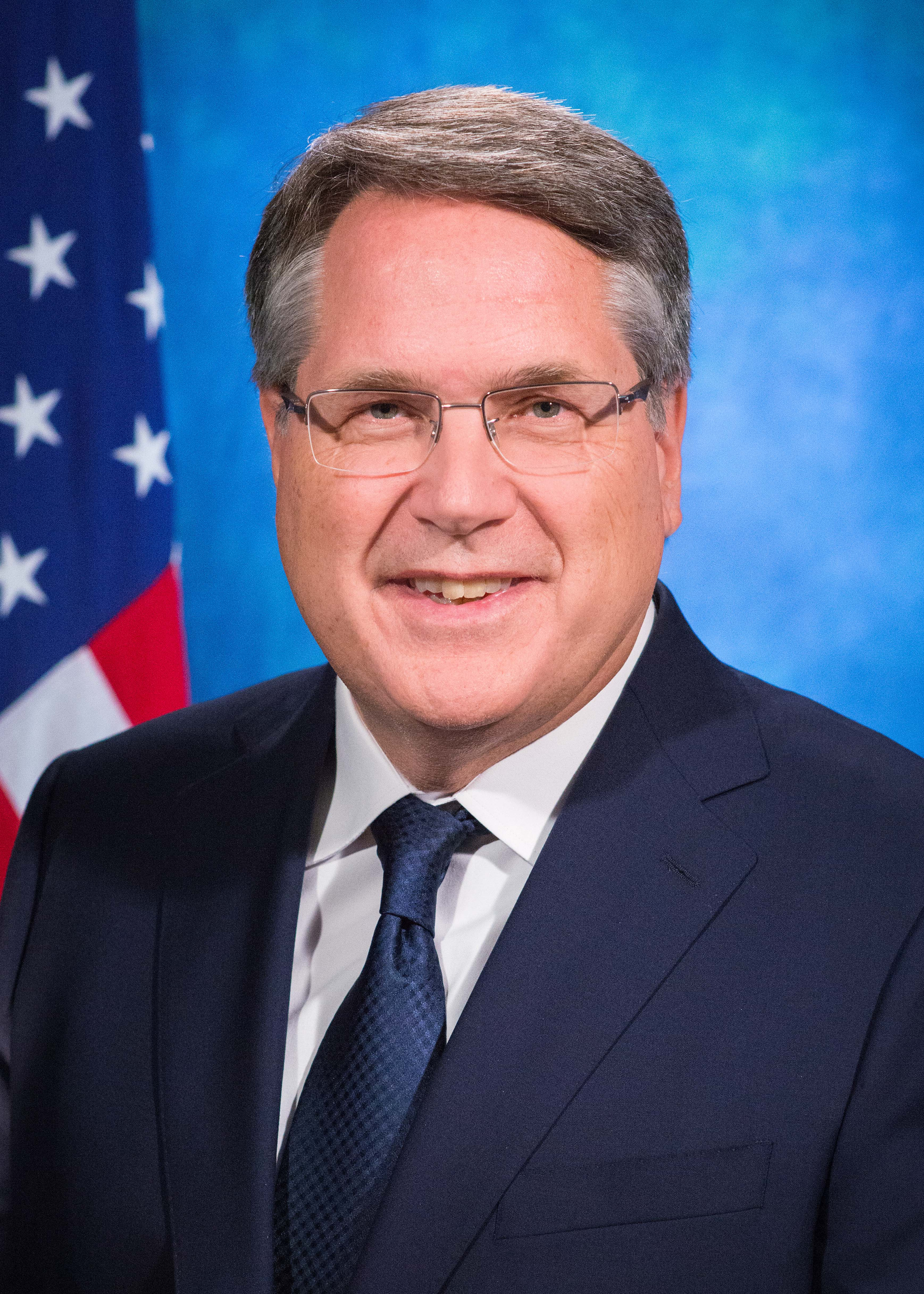
- Official portrait, 2017

United States Ambassador to Sierra Leone
- In office March 24, 2021 – August 24, 2023
- President: Joe Biden
- Preceded by: Maria Brewer
- Succeeded by: Bryan David Hunt

United States Ambassador to Mauritius United States Ambassador to Seychelles
- In office February 6, 2018 – January 15, 2021
- President: Donald Trump
- Preceded by: Shari Villarosa
- Succeeded by: Henry V. Jardine

Personal details
- Education: Goshen College (BA); University of Pittsburgh (MIA)

David Dale Reimer is an American diplomat and member of the Senior Foreign Service. He had served as the United States ambassador to Sierra Leone from 2021 to 2023. He previously served concurrently as the United States ambassador to Mauritius and United States ambassador to Seychelles from 2018 to 2021. He has also served as Chargé d'affaires ad interim to Burundi and Chargé d'Affaires ad interim to Mauritania.

== Education ==
Reimer is a native of Smithville, Ohio. He earned his Bachelor of Arts degree in history from Goshen College and his Master of Public and International Affairs from the University of Pittsburgh.

== Career ==
Reimer has served as a diplomat since 1991. In 2015, he became the director of the Office of West African Affairs in the Bureau of African Affairs at the United States Department of State. Reimer is a former deputy chief of mission and office director.

=== Ambassador to Mauritius and Seychelles ===
On November 2, 2017, President Donald Trump announced his intent to nominate Reimer to be the United States ambassador to Mauritius and United States ambassador to Seychelles. On November 2, 2017, his nomination was confirmed by voice vote in the U.S Senate. He was sworn in as ambassador on December 13, 2017. He left his post on January 15, 2021.

=== Ambassador to Sierra Leone ===
On June 10, 2020, President Donald Trump announced his intent to nominate Reimer to be the next United States ambassador to Sierra Leone. On June 22, 2020, his nomination was sent to the United States Senate. He appeared before the Senate Foreign Relations Committee on December 2 and was confirmed by voice vote of the full Senate in the early morning hours of December 22, 2020. He presented his credentials to President Julius Maada Bio on March 24, 2021.

== Personal life ==
Reimer speaks French, Italian, and German.

Diplomatic posts
Preceded by Shari Villarosa	United States Ambassador to Mauritius and Seychelles; 2018–2021	Succeeded by Judes E. DeBaere; Chargé d'Affaires
Preceded by Maria Brewer	United States Ambassador to Sierra Leone; 2021-2023	Succeeded by Bryan David Hunt
