= Mark Wylea Erwin =

American diplomat

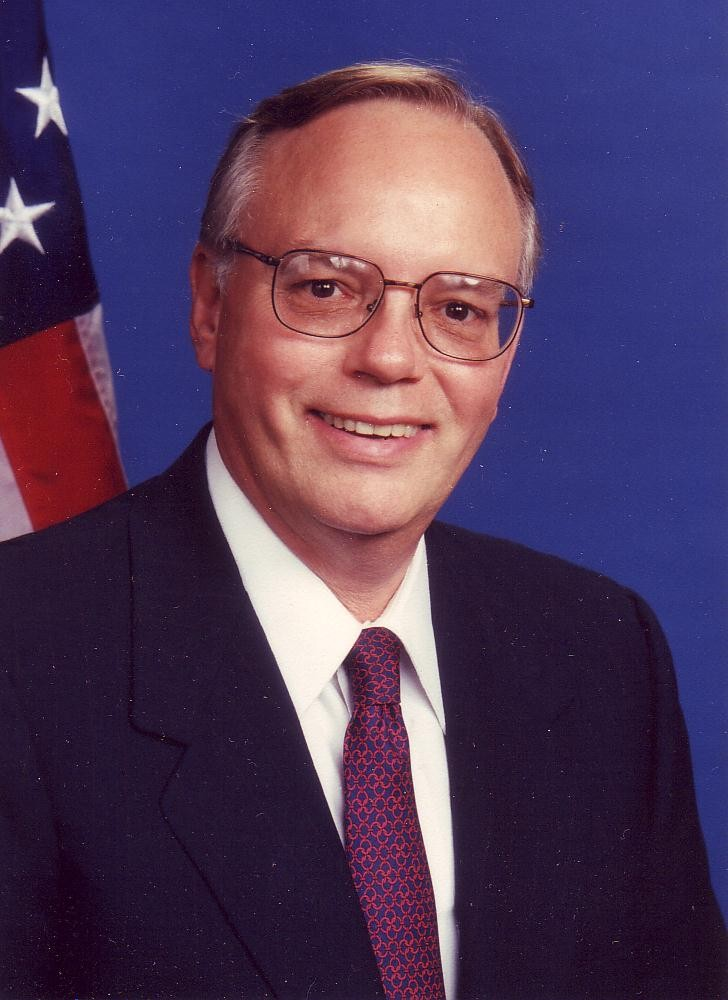

United States Ambassador to Mauritius United States Ambassador to Seychelles
- In office September 14, 1999 – March 4, 2001
- President: Bill Clinton; George W. Bush
- Preceded by: Harold W. Geisel
- Succeeded by: John Price

Personal details
- Born: Mark Wylea Erwin; March 30, 1944 (age 82)

Mark Wylea Erwin (born March 30, 1944) is a former U.S. ambassador and the president of Erwin Capital, Inc., a family-owned investment company in Charlotte, North Carolina.

== Career ==
In 1997, President Bill Clinton appointed him to the board of directors of the Overseas Private Investment Corporation. From 1999 to 2001, Erwin was ambassador to the Republic of Mauritius, the Republic of the Seychelles and the Federal Islamic Republic of the Comoros.

Erwin's books include An Unlikely Journey - Make a Difference. Do Good. Have Fun, Life's Lessons: Lines of Wisdom from a Faithful Stream and The Practical Ambassador. He also wrote a collection of "For the Journey" books, including Faith For the Journey, Collected Wisdom For the Journey and Humor For the Journey. Erwin was an adjunct professor at the Business School of Winthrop University for several years.

Erwin studied real estate at the University of Tennessee and, in 1969, became a real estate administrator for United Parcel Service. He served four years in the United States Air Force. In 2017, the North Carolina governor, Roy Cooper, appointed him to the North Carolina Banking Commission.

Diplomatic posts
Preceded by Harold W. Geisel	United States Ambassador to Seychelles; 1999–2001	Succeeded by John Price
Preceded by Harold W. Geisel	United States Ambassador to Mauritius; 2002–2005	Succeeded by John Price
