= Shari Villarosa =

American diplomat

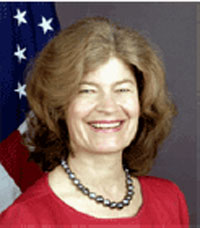

United States Ambassador to the Seychelles United States Ambassador to Mauritius
- In office November 5, 2012 – January 20, 2017
- President: Barack Obama
- Preceded by: Mary Jo Wills
- Succeeded by: David Dale Reimer

United States Ambassador to Burma Acting
- In office August 2005 – September 2008
- President: George W. Bush
- Preceded by: Carmen Martinez
- Succeeded by: Larry Dinger

Personal details
- Born: Shari English Woods Villarosa; 1951 (age 74–75)
- Education: University of North Carolina, Chapel Hill; College of William and Mary

Shari English Woods Villarosa is a United States diplomat and career foreign service officer. She was the United States Ambassador to Mauritius and to the Seychelles from 2012 to 2017.

== Education ==
Shari graduated from the University of North Carolina at Chapel Hill with a degree in International Studies. She also has a law degree from The College of William and Mary. She speaks Spanish, Portuguese, Thai, and Indonesian.

== Career ==
On September 22, 2012, the United States Senate confirmed Villarosa to be Ambassador Extraordinary and Plenipotentiary of the United States of America to the Republic of Mauritius, and to serve concurrently and without additional compensation as Ambassador Extraordinary and Plenipotentiary of the United States of America to the Republic of Seychelles.

She served as the chargé d'affaires for the United States Embassy in Rangoon, Myanmar, from August 2005 to September 2008. At the time, there had not been a U.S. Ambassador to Burma since 1990, so as chargé d'affaires, Villarosa was the chief of mission and the most senior official in the embassy.

She previously served as Director of Philippines, Malaysia, Brunei, Singapore Affairs in the Department of State's East Asia and Pacific Bureau, Economic Counselor of the U.S. Embassy in Jakarta, Indonesia, and Chargé d'Affaires of the U.S. Embassy in Dili, Timor-Leste.

Her other overseas assignments have been in Songkhla, Thailand; Brasília, Brazil; Quito, Ecuador; and Bogotá, Colombia. Her assignments at the State Department in Washington, D.C., have been as Special Assistant to the Under Secretary for Economic Affairs; Deputy Director of the Office of Burma, Cambodia, Laos, Thailand and Vietnam Affairs; Singapore and Indonesia desk officer; and in the Office of Investment Affairs. In addition, she spent a year at the East-West Center in Honolulu, Hawaii, as Diplomat-in-Residence.

== See also ==
- List of ambassadors of the United States

Diplomatic posts
Preceded by Carmen Martinez	Chargés d'Affaires to Myanmar; 2005–2008	Succeeded by Larry Dinger
Preceded by Mary Jo Wills	United States Ambassador to Mauritius; 2012–2017	Succeeded by David Dale Reimer
Preceded by Mary Jo Wills	United States Ambassador to the Seychelles; 2012–2017	Succeeded by David Dale Reimer
