= Thomas P. Shoesmith =

American diplomat

Thomas Shoesmith

9th United States Ambassador to Malaysia
- In office December 12, 1983 – February 14, 1987
- President: Ronald Reagan
- Preceded by: Ronald D. Palmer
- Succeeded by: John Cameron Monjo

Personal details
- Born: January 25, 1922 Palmerton, Pennsylvania, U.S.
- Died: April 26, 2007 (aged 85) Springfield, Virginia, U.S.
- Children: 2
- Education: University of Pennsylvania (BS); Harvard University (MA)

Military service
- Branch/service: United States Army

Thomas P. Shoesmith (January 25, 1922 – April 26, 2007) was an American diplomat who served as the ninth United States ambassador to Malaysia from December 12, 1983, until his retirement February 14, 1987.

== Early life and education ==
Shoesmith was born in Palmerton, Pennsylvania. He graduated from Stroudsburg High School in 1939 and continued his education at the University of Pennsylvania, graduating with a Bachelor of Science degree in education in 1943. He spent five years in the United States Army. When he returned, he earned a Master of Arts degree from Harvard University.

He entered the Army as a private in 1943 and in 1944, spent about a year at Yale University under the Army Specialized Training Program in the Japanese language program. Shortly afterwards, he entered the Japanese language program under the Military Intelligence Language School at the University of Michigan. When he finished, he was commissioned in 1945, sent to Japan as a Japanese language officer serving in the G-2 Section of SCAP for two years.

== Career ==
He moved to Washington, DC to begin his career with the government. In 1955, he was inducted into the United States Foreign Service, beginning a 32-year tenure with the department. During his career, he served in Hong Kong, Korea and Japan. He was appointed ambassador to Malaysia in 1983.

He assigned to Hong Kong as a consular officer, also assigned to Macau. After two years, he was reassigned to the Political Office.

== Death ==
Shoesmith died of cancer at his home in Springfield, Virginia and is survived by his wife, Martha Houser Shoesmith, his two children, Jo "Josie" Shoesmith and Thomas M. Shoesmith, daughter-in-law, Merribeth K. Shoesmith, two grandchildren, Julia "Jae" Shoesmith and Michael T. Shoesmith and his sister Jane.

Diplomatic posts
Preceded by Ronald D. Palmer	United States Ambassador to Malaysia; 1981–1983	Succeeded by John Cameron Monjo
