= Mauritius–United States relations =

- Mauritius: United States

Diplomatic mission
- Embassy of the United States, Port Louis: Embassy of Mauritius, Washington, D.C.

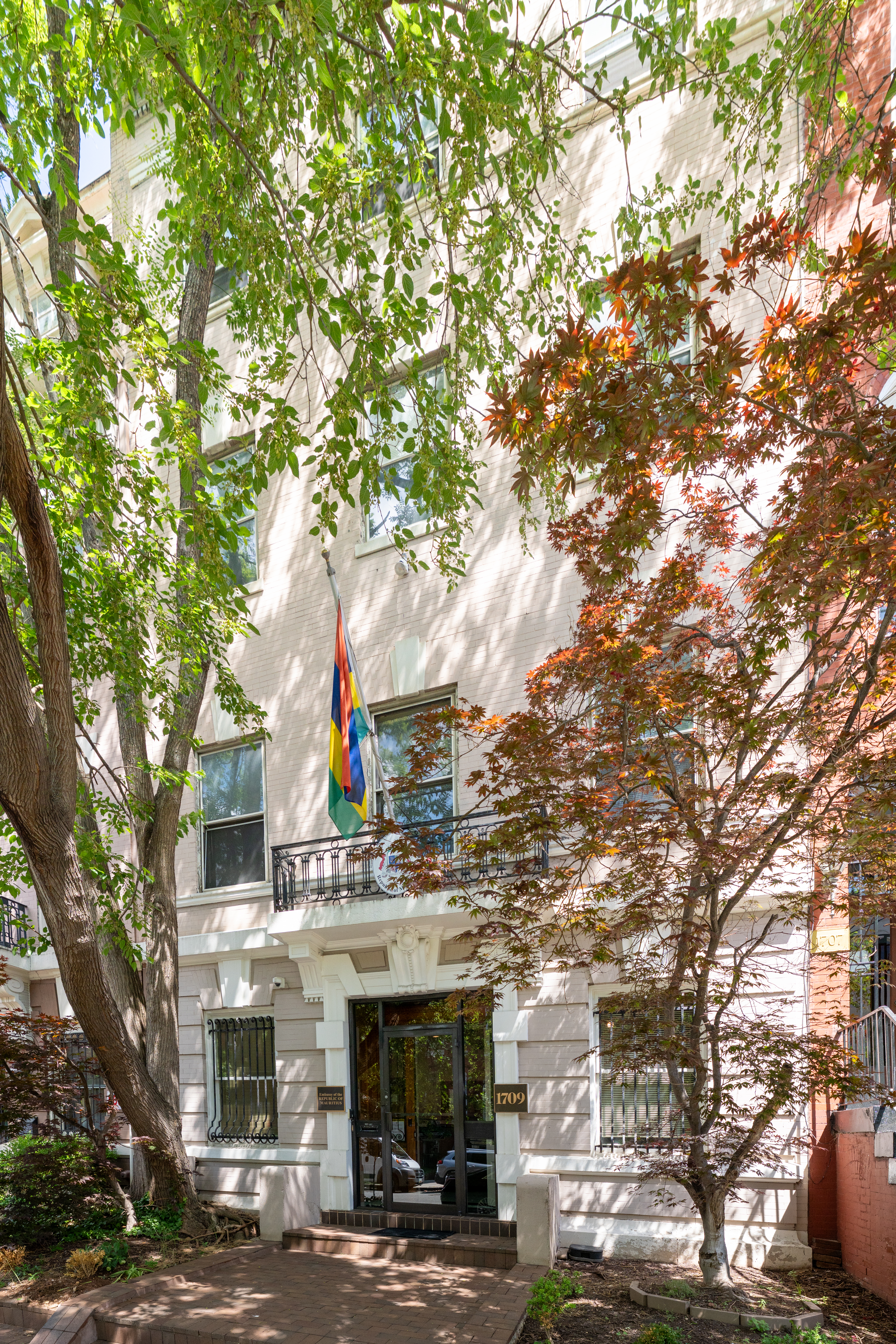
Embassy in Washington, D.C.

Mauritius–United States relations are bilateral relations between Mauritius and the United States.

Official U.S. representation in Mauritius dates from the end of the 18th century. An American consulate was established in 1794 and was closed in 1911. It was reopened in 1967 and elevated to embassy status upon Mauritius' independence in 1968. Since 1970, the mission has been directed by a resident U.S. ambassador. There is a U.S. Embassy in Port Louis, Mauritius.

Relations between the United States and Mauritius are cordial and largely revolve around trade. The United States is Mauritius’ third-largest market but ranks 12th in terms of exports to Mauritius. Principal imports from the U.S. include aircraft parts (for Air Mauritius), automatic data processing machines, diamonds, jewelry, radio/TV transmission apparatus, telecommunications equipment, agricultural/construction/industrial machinery and equipment, casino slot machines, outboard motors, books and encyclopedias, and industrial chemicals.

Mauritian exports to the U.S. include apparel, sugar, non-industrial diamonds, jewelry articles, live animals, sunglasses, rum, and cut flowers. Mauritian products that meet the rules of origin are eligible for duty- and quota-free entry in the U.S. market under the African Growth and Opportunity Act. In September 2006, the Governments of Mauritius and the United States signed a Trade and Investment Framework Agreement to remove impediments and further enhance trade and investment relations between the two countries.

More than 200 U.S. companies are represented in Mauritius. About 30 have offices in Mauritius, serving the domestic and/or the regional market, mainly in the information technology (IT), textile, fast food, express courier, and financial services sectors. The largest U.S. subsidiaries are Caltex Oil Mauritius and Esso Mauritius. U.S. brands are sold widely. Several U.S. franchises, notably Kentucky Fried Chicken, Pizza Hut, and McDonald's have been operating for a number of years in Mauritius.

The United States funds a small military assistance program. The embassy also manages special self-help funds for community groups and nongovernmental organizations and a democracy and human rights fund.

In 2002, Mauritius recalled its Ambassador to the United Nations for not conveying his government's stance in the Security Council debate over how to disarm Iraq.

Principal U.S. Embassy Officials include:

- Ambassador - Henry V. Jardine

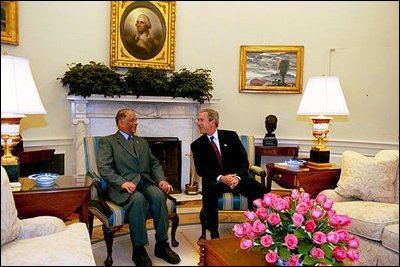
George W. Bush and Mauritian Prime Minister Anerood Jugnauth. Oval Office, June 26, 2003.

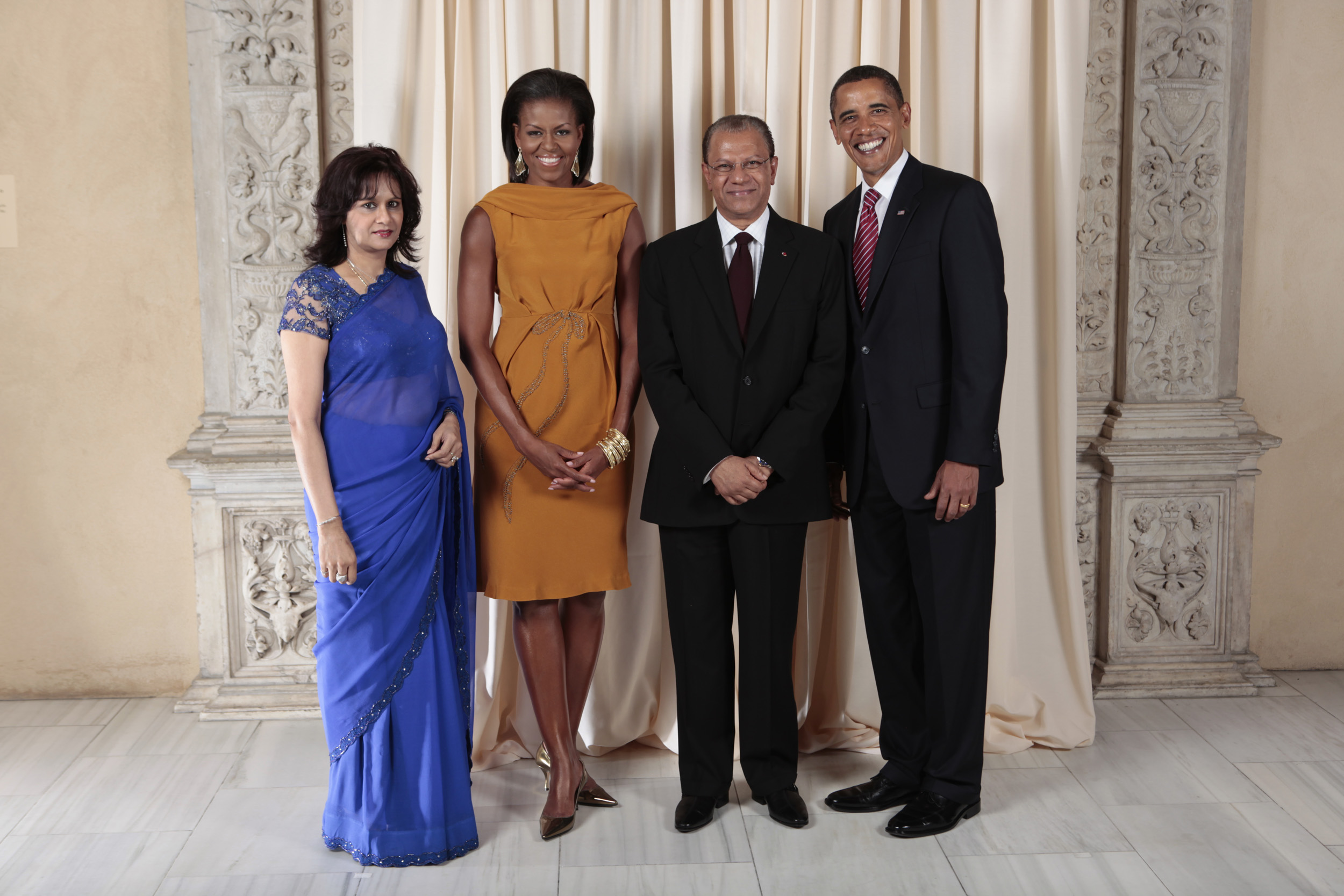
Prime Minister of Mauritius Dr. Navin Ramgoolam and his wife Veena Ramgoolam with the President of the United States Barack Obama and First Lady Michelle Obama.

== Chagos Archipelago sovereignty dispute ==
Before Mauritius gain its independence, the Chagos Archipelago was detached from Mauritius and formed British Indian Ocean Territory. The UK expelled inhabitants of the Chagos Archipelago in 1968 at the request of US and a military base was leased to US.

The ongoing sovereignty dispute between Mauritius and UK has resulted in an advisory opinion by the International Court of Justice, endorsed by the UN general assembly, that found the UK's claim to the archipelago breached international law. However, the US does not recognise Mauritius' claim to the full Chagos Archipelago, voting against any claim made within the United Nations.

In an attempt to bypass UK and negotiate with US directly, Mauritius has offered US a 99-year lease of Diego Garcia island. Offering the lease to US was widely supported by Mauritian citizens.
