= Robert C. F. Gordon =

American diplomat

United States Ambassador to Mauritius
- In office 17 April 1980 – 2 September 1983
- President: Jimmy Carter
- Preceded by: Samuel Rhea Gammon III
- Succeeded by: George Roberts Andrews

Personal details
- Born: March 19, 1920 Berkeley, California, U.S.
- Died: June 12, 2001 (aged 81) Clancy, Montana, U.S.
- Profession: Diplomat

Robert Charles Frost Gordon (March 19, 1920 – June 12, 2001) was an American diplomat, appointed as U.S. Ambassador to Mauritius. He graduated with a B.A. in 1941 and an M.A. (1949) from the University of California at Berkeley.

From 1965 to 1970, Gordon was the counselor for political-military affairs in Rome. He then was special assistant for welfare and grievances at the State Department from 1970 to 1972. From 1972 to 1978, he was the consul general in Florence.

Gordon was appointed by Jimmy Carter to be United States Ambassador to Mauritius in 1980. He would replace Samuel Rhea Gammon III, who resigned. He was coordinator for the handicapped at the State Department from 1978 to 1980.

Diplomatic posts
Preceded by Samuel Rhea Gammon III	United States Ambassador to Mauritius; 1983–1986	Succeeded by George Roberts Andrews
