= John Price (diplomat) =

American diplomat

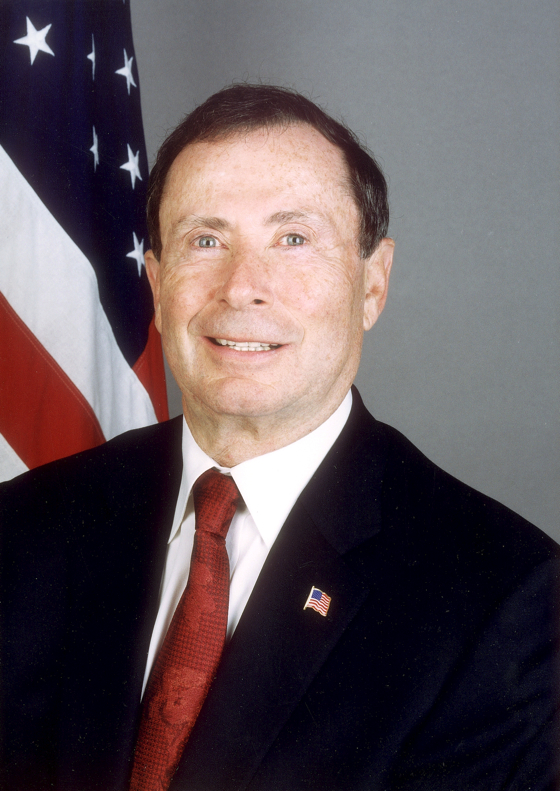

14th United States Ambassador to Mauritius
- In office 26 April 2002 – 22 June 2005
- President: George W. Bush
- Preceded by: Mark Wylea Erwin
- Succeeded by: Cesar B. Cabrera

14th United States Ambassador to Seychelles
- In office 17 July 2002 – 22 June 2005
- President: George W. Bush
- Preceded by: Mark Wylea Erwin
- Succeeded by: Cesar B. Cabrera

Personal details
- Born: Hans Joachim Praiss; 1933 (age 92–93) Berlin, Germany
- Party: Republican
- Spouse: Marcia Poulsen
- Children: 3, 8 grandchildren
- Profession: Diplomat

John Price (born 1933 in Berlin, Germany) is an American diplomat. He served as United States Ambassador to Mauritius and the Seychelles. He is a member of the Council of American Ambassadors and CEO of JP Realty.

== Biography ==
Price was born Hans Joachim Praiss to a Jewish family in Germany in 1933 and experienced Kristallnacht as a child. His family left Germany in April 1939, first for Panama and then the United States where they had relatives. He moved to Utah at the age of 18 and earned a B.A. at the University of Utah in 1956. In 1957, he founded J. Price Construction Co. and later, renamed JP Realty, Inc. In January 1994, the company filed an IPO on the New York Stock Exchange.

He served as a trustee Administrator at the University of Utah from 1992 to 1999. He also has been an active supporter of George W. Bush. In 1957, he married Utah native Marcia Poulsen whom he met in college; they have three children.

Diplomatic posts
Preceded by Mark Wylea Erwin	United States Ambassador to Mauritius; 2002-2005	Succeeded by Cesar B. Cabrera
