= Bryan David Hunt =

American diplomat

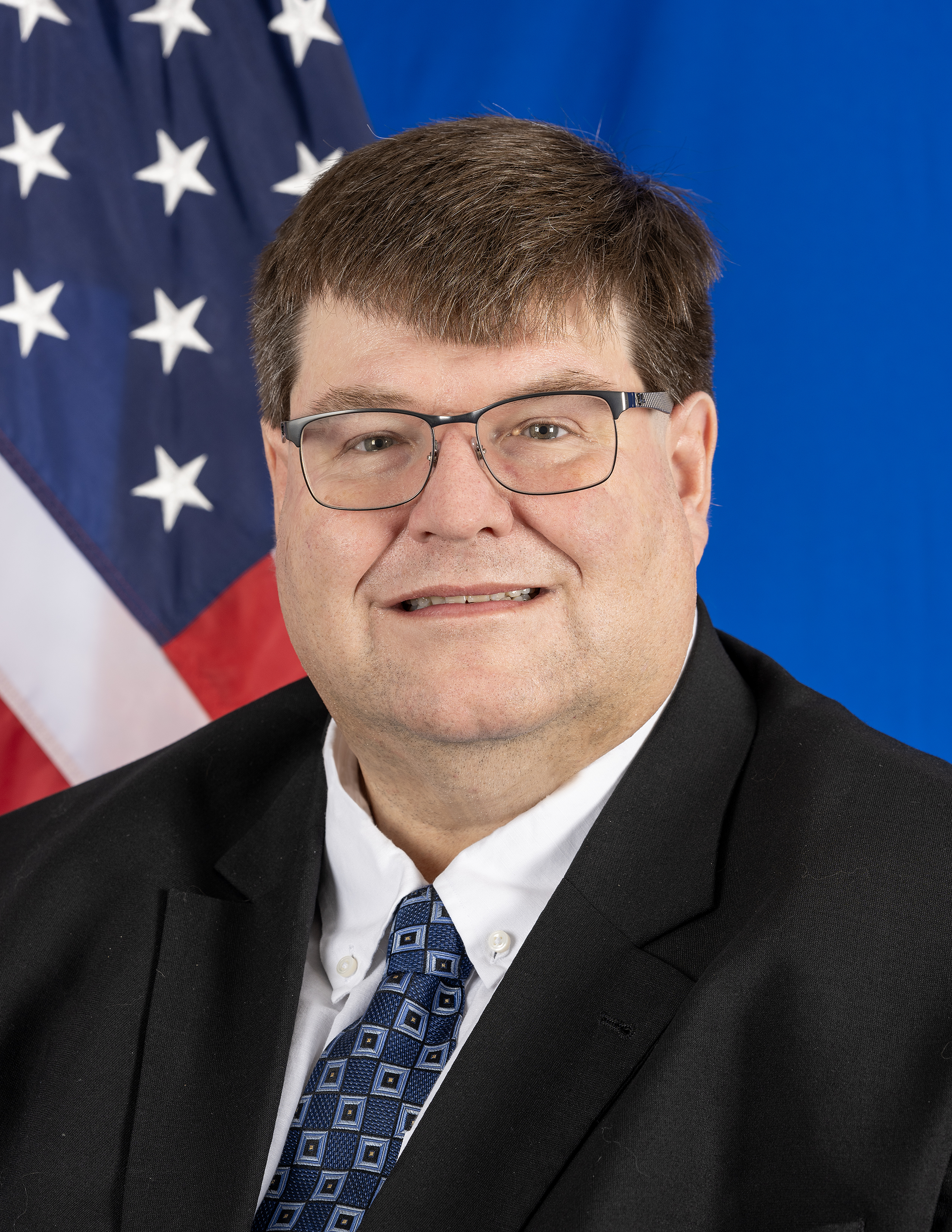

United States Ambassador to Sierra Leone
- In office September 11, 2023 – September 17, 2025
- President: Joe Biden; Donald Trump
- Preceded by: David Dale Reimer
- Succeeded by: Daniel Travis

Personal details
- Born: Bryan David Hunt
- Education: American University (BA)

Bryan David Hunt is an American diplomat who had served as the United States ambassador to Sierra Leone.

== Early life and education ==
Hunt was born in Newport News, Virginia. In 1995, he earned his bachelor's degree from American University in Washington, D.C.

== Career ==
Hunt is a career member of the Senior Foreign Service, with the rank of Minister Counselor. He previously served as the Senior Foreign Policy Advisor to the United States Transportation Command at Scott Air Force Base in Illinois. Before this role, Hunt served as the director of the Office of South Sudan and Sudan in the Bureau of African Affairs in the United States Department of State. Hunt also concurrently served as the State Department's Acting Deputy Assistant Secretary for East Africa, Sudan, and South Sudan. Earlier, Hunt served as Deputy Chief of Mission at the U.S. Embassies in Maputo, Mozambique, Georgetown, Guyana, and Port Moresby, Papua New Guinea. He also served as Principal Officer at the U.S. Consulate in Lahore, Pakistan and as Political Counselor and Political Officer at the U.S. Embassy in Islamabad, Pakistan. Hunt's earlier overseas assignments include as Political Officer at the U.S. Embassy in Maputo, Mozambique; Consular and Commercial Officer at the U.S. Embassy in Gaborone, Botswana; and Political, Economic, and Consular Officer at the U.S. Embassy in Bissau, Guinea-Bissau. Domestically, Hunt also served as deputy director for Regional Affairs, in the Africa Bureau's Office of Regional and Security Affairs and as the Africa Bureau's Desk Officer for Angola. Hunt is a recipient of the State Department's Distinguished Honor Award, Superior Honor Award, Meritorious Honor Award, and Franklin Award; the U.S. Coast Guard's Meritorious Public Service Award; and the Chairman of the Joint Chief of Staff's Distinguished Civilian Service Award.

=== United States ambassador to Sierra Leone ===
On March 6, 2023, President Joe Biden nominated Hunt to be the next ambassador to Sierra Leone. Hearings on his nomination were held before the Senate Foreign Relations Committee on May 16, 2023. The committee favorably reported his nomination on June 8, 2023. The nomination was confirmed by the full Senate via voice vote on July 27, 2023. Hunt presented his credentials to the President of Sierra Leone on September 11, 2023.

== Personal life ==
Hunt speaks English, Portuguese, German, and Urdu.
