= Alje Vennema =

Dutch-Canadian doctor (1932–2011)

Alje Vennema, OC, CD (1932-June 7, 2011) was a Dutch-Canadian doctor. Born in Leeuwarden, the Netherlands, in 1932, he arrived in Canada in 1951 and studied at the McGill University Medical School (graduating 1962). From 1965 to 1968 he was director of Canadian medical assistance in Vietnam. He received the Order of Canada in 1967.

After his time in Vietnam he studied at the London School of Hygiene & Tropical Medicine. In 1982 he qualified as a pediatrician. He worked at Tulane University in New Orleans and subsequently in New York City, where he was to be director of the New York City Department of Health's Bureau of Tuberculosis.

He died at home on 7 June 2011.

== Publications ==
- The Vietcong Massacre at Hue (New York: Vantage Press, 1976) on the 1968 Massacre at Huế.

== Sources ==
- Obituary by Richard K. Elwood, British Columbia Medical Journal 53:7 (September 2011), p. 364.
