= Mary Jo Wills =

American diplomat

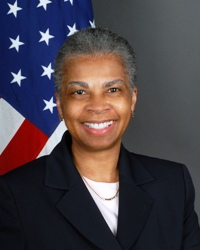

United States Ambassador to Mauritius United States Ambassador to Seychelles
- In office February 18, 2010 – February 26, 2011
- President: Barack Obama
- Preceded by: Cesar B. Cabrera
- Succeeded by: Shari Villarosa

Mary Jo Wills (born 1951) was the U.S. ambassador to Mauritius and Seychelles starting in February 2010. She ended her term on February 26, 2011. At the time of her appointment, Wills was the Acting Deputy Assistant Secretary for African Affairs since January 2009.

Wills earned an earned a bachelor's degree in history from Chatham College in Pittsburgh, Pennsylvania, in 1973 and M.B.A. in 1994 from Virginia Tech and has been pursuing a doctorate at their Center for Public Administration and Policy. She has a master's degree in National Security Strategy from the National War College.
