= List of ambassadors of the United States to Seychelles =

Ambassador of the United States to Seychelles
- Seal of the United States Department of State

- Flag of a United States ambassador

- Incumbent; Christopher L. Green; Chargé d'affaires since August 3, 2026
- Nominator: The president of the United States
- Inaugural holder: Anthony D. Marshall as Ambassador
- Formation: April 1, 1976
- Website: U.S. Embassy - Seychelles

The United States ambassador to Seychelles is the official representative of the government of the United States to the government of Seychelles. The embassy is located in Victoria.

== Ambassadors ==
- 1 April 1976 - 26 April 1977 Anthony D. Marshall (Resident at Nairobi; Consulate established April 1, 1976)
- 19 July 1977 - 28 June 1980 Wilbert J. LeMelle (Resident at Nairobi)
- 26 August 1980 - 22 September 1983 William Harrop (Resident at Nairobi)
- 2 November 1983 - 9 June 1985 David Joseph Fischer
- 23 August 1985 - 8 July 1987 Irvin Hicks
- 15 December 1987 - 31 August 1991 James B. Moran
- 1 October 1991 - 5 July 1992 Richard W. Carlson
- 22 September 1992 - 1 March 1993 Mack F. Mattingly
- 1 March 1993 - 7 September 1994 F. Stephen Malott (Chargé d'affaires)
- 7 September 1994 - 12 May 1995 Carl B. Stokes
- 12 May 1995 - 29 August 1996 Brent E. Blaschke (Chargé d'affaires)
- 29 August 1996 - 27 May 1999 Harold W. Geisel (Resident at Mauritius)
- 14 September 1999 - 4 March 2001 Mark Wylea Erwin (Resident at Mauritius)
- 17 July 2002 - 22 June 2005 John Price (Resident at Mauritius)
- 2 October 2006 - 14 October 2009 Cesar B. Cabrera (Resident at Mauritius)
- 18 February 2010 - 26 February 2011 Mary Jo Wills (Resident at Mauritius)
- 5 November 2012 - 20 January 2017 Shari Villarosa (Resident at Mauritius)
- 6 February 2018 - 15 January 2021 David Dale Reimer (Resident at Mauritius)
- 21 March 2023 - 16 January 2026 Henry V. Jardine (Resident at Mauritius)

== See also ==
- Seychelles – United States relations
- Foreign relations of Seychelles
- Ambassadors of the United States
