= Ronald D. Palmer =

American diplomat (1932–2014)

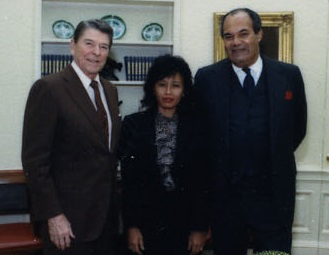
- Ronald Reagan, Tengku Palmer and Ronald Palmer in 1988

7th United States Ambassador to Togo
- In office 1976–1978
- President: Gerald Ford; Jimmy Carter
- Preceded by: Nancy V. Rawls
- Succeeded by: Marilyn P. Johnson

8th United States Ambassador to Malaysia
- In office 1981–1983
- President: Ronald Reagan
- Preceded by: Barbara M. Watson
- Succeeded by: Thomas P. Shoesmith

9th United States Ambassador to Mauritius
- In office 1986–1989
- President: Ronald Reagan
- Preceded by: George Roberts Andrews
- Succeeded by: Penne Percy Korth

Personal details
- Born: May 22, 1932 Uniontown, Pennsylvania, U.S.
- Died: April 21, 2014 (aged 81)
- Spouse(s): Euna Scott, princess Tengku Intan Bakar of Malaysia
- Profession: Diplomat

Ronald DeWayne Palmer (May 22, 1932 – April 21, 2014) was an American diplomat who served as United States Ambassador to Togo (1976–1978), Malaysia (1981–1983), and Mauritius (1986–1989).

== Early life ==
He was born in Uniontown, Pennsylvania. From 1947 to 1949 he finished graduating high school in Detroit. After graduation Palmer received a B.A. from Howard University in 1954 with the majors of French and Economics. He became a Fulbright Scholar in France September 1954 and in October began teaching in the Institute of Political Science at the University of Bordeaux. In 1955 Palmer won a fellowship for the M.A, program at the School of Advanced International Studies (SAIS) of Johns Hopkins University graduating in 1957.

== Career ==
Palmer began his duty in the Foreign Service Officer Class in 1957 for training. His first assignment was in Laos-Cambodia in the Division of Research for the Far East in the State Department's Office of Intelligence and Research from June 1957- August 1959. Within the State Department he was working with diplomat Marshal Green and began studying Indonesian in August 1959.

From 1960 to 1962 Palmer worked as a junior member of the Economics Section in the U.S. Embassy in Jakarta. October 1962 he was placed as economics officer in Kuala Lumpur and ended the tour early in June 1963 due to his wife's illness. He worked in the Washington State Department Operations Center of the Executive Secretariat as staff aide to Assistant Secretary Lucius Durham Battle Jr. from 1964 to 1965. From 1965 to 1967 Palmer was a cultural affairs officer in U.S. Embassy Copenhagen and wrote speeches for Ambassador Katharine Elkus White.

Then he became assigned at the United States Military Academy at West Point as a State Department Faculty Member and assistant professor in the Department of Social Sciences. While in the State Department in 1969 he conducted a historic study for changes needed to the 1947 U.S.-Philippine Military Bases Agreement mandated by Henry Kissinger. To oversee the implementation of the Bass Agreement in Manila he gained the position of political-military officer from 1971 to 1975.

In 1975 he was selected to be Deputy of Human Rights and late in 1976–1978 to serve as the Ambassador to Togo. While serving as ambassador to Togo he had the best Peace Corps in the world and one of the best embassies. 1978–1981 Palmer was named Head of Foreign Service Personnel office.

He then became recognized during the Reagan Administration to be assigned as Ambassador to Malaysia in Kuala Lumpur from 1981 to 1983.

1983–1986 Palmer worked for the Center for Strategic and International Studies (CSIS) as a visiting scholar. He wrote a book while at CSIS; his work received attention from the White House and the Department of State.

The attention lead to his position as Ambassador to Mauritius in 1986–1989.

He was also a member of the American Academy of Diplomacy and Council on Foreign Relations. He was married to Euna Scott and has 2 Children.

=== Life in Copenhagen ===
Palmer was in Copenhagen from 1965 to 1967 placed as Cultural Affairs Officer in Copenhagen and had received 100 hours of the Danish Language before. The idea for the program is to provide youthful, energetic officers for him to uphold.

He was responsible for the Fulbright Commission with a budget close to $200,000.

He attended theater, dance, and music venues. He gave a lecture called "Negro-White Relations In the United States" at the Copenhagen student club and Aarhus University in Tutland.

Diplomatic posts
Preceded by Nancy V. Rawls	United States Ambassador to Togo; 1976–1978	Succeeded by Marilyn P. Johnson
Preceded by Barbara M. Watson	United States Ambassador to Malaysia; 1981–1983	Succeeded by Thomas P. Shoesmith
Preceded by George Roberts Andrews	United States Ambassador to Mauritius; 1986–1989	Succeeded by Penne Percy Korth
