= Samuel Rhea Gammon III =

American diplomat (1924–2024)

United States Ambassador to Mauritius
- In office 20 December 1978 – 20 January 1980
- President: Jimmy Carter
- Preceded by: Robert V. Keeley
- Succeeded by: Robert C. F. Gordon

Personal details
- Born: January 22, 1924 Sherman, Texas, U.S.
- Died: October 21, 2024 (aged 100) Charlottesville, Virginia, U.S.
- Profession: Diplomat

Samuel Rhea Gammon III (January 22, 1924 – October 21, 2024) was an American diplomat who served as the United States Ambassador to Mauritius under the Carter Administration. He also served as the Deputy Chief of Mission in Paris under ambassadors Kenneth Rush (1974–77) and Arthur Hartman (1977–81). He later resigned the ambassadorship, and was replaced by Robert C. F. Gordon. On February 15, 2012, he endowed a gift of $200,000 to the Department of History at Texas A&M University.

Gammon was a veteran of World War II, serving in the U.S. Army from 1943 to 1946. In 2020, it was reported that Gammon, then aged 96, had also donated an estate gift to Texas A&M University's Department of History to honour the memory of his father. He died in Charlottesville, Virginia on October 21, 2024, at the age of 100.

Diplomatic posts
Preceded by Robert V. Keeley	United States Ambassador to Mauritius; 1978–1980	Succeeded by Robert C. F. Gordon
