= César Benito Cabrera =

American diplomat

Ambassador César Benito Cabrera

15th United States Ambassador to Mauritius
- In office October 2, 2006 – October 14, 2009
- President: George W. Bush; Barack Obama
- Preceded by: John Price
- Succeeded by: Mary Jo Wills

15th United States Ambassador to Seychelles
- In office October 2, 2006 – October 14, 2009
- President: George W. Bush; Barack Obama
- Preceded by: John Price
- Succeeded by: Mary Jo Willis

Personal details
- Born: 1947 (age 78–79) San Juan, Puerto Rico
- Party: Republican
- Spouse: Helvetia Barros
- Children: 1
- Education: University of Puerto Rico at Mayaguez (BE)
- Profession: Diplomatic corps

César Benito Cabrera (born in San Juan, Puerto Rico, 1947) was the former United States Ambassador to the island nations of Mauritius and the Seychelles, both located in the Indian Ocean. He was nominated by President George W. Bush on June 6, 2006. His appointment was confirmed by the U.S. Senate on September 13, 2006. Ambassador Cabrera arrived in Port Louis on October 20, 2006, and presented his credentials to Mauritian President Sir Anerood Jugnauth on October 23, 2006.

Cabrera is currently the president of Barza Development Corporation with over 25 years of commercial development and business experience in the Puerto Rican real estate market. He has served as a member of the board of directors of the Federal Home Loan Mortgage Corporation. He received his bachelor's degree in civil engineering from the University of Puerto Rico at Mayagüez in 1971, there he joined Phi Sigma Alpha fraternity.

Cabrera has also had an active political career. From 1992 to 2004, he served as executive director of the Republican Party of Puerto Rico and led the Puerto Rico delegation to the Republican National Convention in 2000. In 2004, he was a member of the U.S. Presidential delegation at the inauguration of Martin Torrijos, President of Panama. He has also served on the board of directors of the Federal Home Loan Mortgage Corporation. He is a member of the Council of American Ambassadors. He is fluent in Spanish and English. He is married to Helvetia Barros, has one daughter, and one granddaughter.

Diplomatic posts
Preceded by John Price	United States Ambassador to Mauritius; 2006–2009	Succeeded by Mary Jo Wills
