= Douglas Pike =

American historian (1924–2002)

- Born: Douglas Eugene Pike; July 27, 1924; Cass Lake, Minnesota, U.S.
- Died: May 13, 2002 (aged 77); Lubbock, Texas, U.S.
- Education: University of North Dakota; UC Berkeley (B.A.); American University (M.A.); MIT
- Occupation: Historian
- Spouse: Myrna Johnson (m. 1956)
- Children: 3

Douglas Eugene Pike (July 27, 1924 – May 13, 2002) was a leading American historian and foremost scholar on the Vietnam War and the Viet Cong based from 1997 onward at Texas Tech University. In 1960, Pike became a Foreign Service Officer in the United States Information Agency and was sent to South Vietnam. Aside from serving in Saigon he had assignments in Hong Kong, Tokyo, Taipei, and Washington, but Vietnam was the focus of most of his career. In 1981 he retired from the Foreign Service and became director of the Indochina Studies Program at the University of California, Berkeley. Included in his duties in that position were serving as director of the Indochina Archive and editor of Indochina Chronology, published quarterly beginning in 1982. He was considered an expert on the National Liberation Front and NVA (People's Army of Vietnam) before his death in 2002.

Pike received a degree in journalism from the University of North Dakota as a bachelor's in international communications from the University of California, Berkeley and also a MA from American University in Washington D.C. (1958). Pike worked at the MIT Center for International Studies (1963–64) a year after graduate.

He founded the journal Indochina Chronology, and has authored numerous books and articles on the war and the National Liberation Front. His book PAVN: People's Army of Vietnam has been described as "one of the two or three most significant books to emerge from the war".

== Early life ==
Pike was born in Cass Lake, Minnesota. He grew up in Minor and had planned on a career in journalism, but with the outbreak of World War II, he joined the Army Signal Corps and served in the South Pacific. He served between 1943–1946 and reached the rank of Master Sergeant.

== The Indochina Chronology ==
Pike founded The Indochina Chronology in 1982 to cover both historical and contemporary events in Vietnam, Cambodia, and Laos. Articles were published until Pike's death in 2002.

== Published works ==
- Douglas Pike, Viet Cong. The organization and techniques of the National Liberation Front of South Vietnam (Massachusetts Institute of Technology 1966)
- Douglas Pike, War, Peace, and the Viet Cong (Massachusetts Institute of Technology 1969)
- Douglas Pike, The Viet-Cong Strategy of Terror (United States Mission, Vietnam, 1970)
- Douglas Pike, History of Vietnamese Communism, 1925-1976 (Hoover Institution Press 1978)
- Douglas Pike, PAVN: People's Army of Vietnam (Presidio Press 1986)
