= Henry V. Jardine =

American diplomat

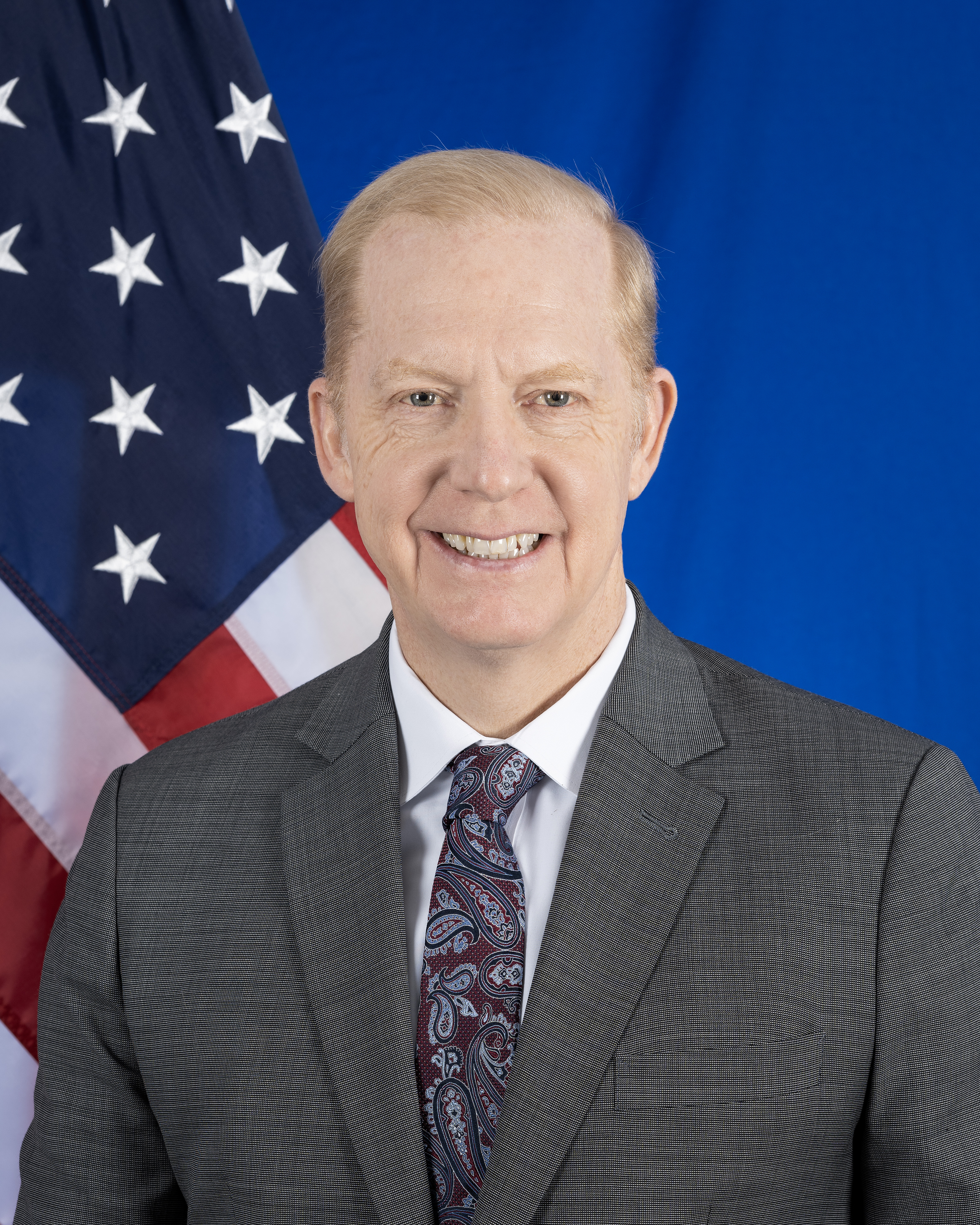
- Official portrait, 2023

United States Ambassador to Mauritius
- In office February 22, 2023 – January 16, 2026
- President: Joe Biden; Donald Trump
- Preceded by: David Dale Reimer

United States Ambassador to Seychelles
- In office March 21, 2023 – January 16, 2026
- President: Joe Biden; Donald Trump
- Preceded by: David Dale Reimer

Personal details
- Education: Georgetown University (BS); National Defense University (MS)

Military service
- Branch/service: United States Army
- Years of service: 1989–1993
- Rank: U.S. Army Captain
- Unit: 2nd Battalion, 327th Infantry Regiment, 101st Airborne Division and 3rd Battalion, 8th Infantry Regiment, 8th Infantry Division (United States)

Henry Victor Jardine is an American diplomat and former military officer who had served as the United States ambassador to Mauritius and Seychelles.

== Early life and education ==
Jardine earned a Bachelor of Science degree from the Georgetown University School of Foreign Service and a Master of Science from the National Defense University.

== Career ==
Jardine is a career member of the Senior Foreign Service, with the rank of minister-counselor. He served as the Director of the Office for Career Development and Assignments in Washington, D.C. as part of the United States Department of State. Jardine previously served as the Principal Deputy Director of the Bureau of Overseas Buildings Operations for the State Department, as well as the executive director of the Bureau for Western Hemisphere Affairs. Other overseas assignments include Management Counselor of the U.S. embassy in Bangkok, Thailand, Deputy Chief of Mission of the U.S. embassy in Tirana, Albania, and Consul General of the U.S. consulate general in Kolkata, India. He also served at the U.S. consulate general in Chiang Mai, Thailand, the U.S. embassy in Bridgetown, Barbados, and the U.S. embassy, in Dhaka, Bangladesh. Jardine also served in the U.S. Army from 1989 to 1993 in the 327th Infantry Regiment and the 8th Infantry Regiment in which he eventually reached the rank of captain.

=== United States ambassador to Mauritius and Seychelles ===
On July 6, 2022, President Joe Biden nominated Jardine to serve as the next ambassador to Mauritius and Seychelles. On November 29, 2022, hearings on his nomination were held before the Senate Foreign Relations Committee. On December 7, 2022, the committee favorably reported his nomination to the Senate. On December 13, 2022, his nomination was confirmed in the Senate by voice vote. He was sworn in by Acting Deputy Secretary John R. Bass on January 19, 2023, and he presented his credentials to President of Mauritius Prithvirajsing Roopun on February 22, 2023, and to President of Seychelles Wavel Ramkalawan on March 21, 2023.

== Personal life ==
Jardine speaks Bengali, Thai, Spanish, German, and Albanian.

Diplomatic posts
Preceded by David Dale Reimer	United States Ambassador to Mauritius; 2023–2026	Vacant
Preceded by David Dale Reimer	United States Ambassador to Seychelles; 2023–2026	Vacant
