= Michael G. Sotirhos =

Greek-American diplomat (1928–2019)

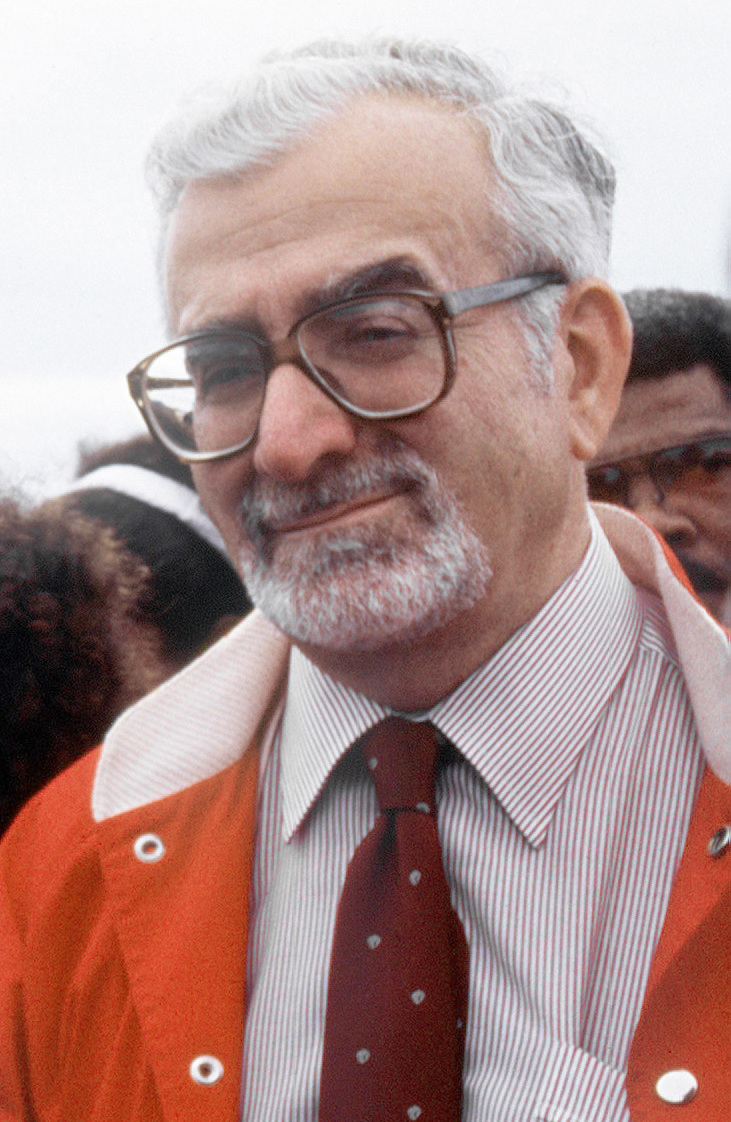
Sotirhos in 1988

Michael G. Sotirhos (November 12, 1928 Manhattan – April 14, 2019 Florida) was the first Greek-American to serve as the United States Ambassador to Greece, a position he assumed in 1989. He was Ambassador to Jamaica from 1985–1989.

Born and raised in Manhattan, his parents arrived at Ellis Island from Greece in 1923. He graduated from Baruch College.

== Career ==
A former chairman International Operations Committee, Peace Corps, Sotirhos was also on the Executive Committee of the Republican National Committee.

When he graduated from college, he was one of the people who “formed the predecessor to the Ariston Group which had varied interests in real estate, construction and commercial interior design. He served that company and its other related business interests until he entered government service in 1985.”
