= Joseph Melrose =

American diplomat (1944–2014)

Joseph H. Melrose Jr.
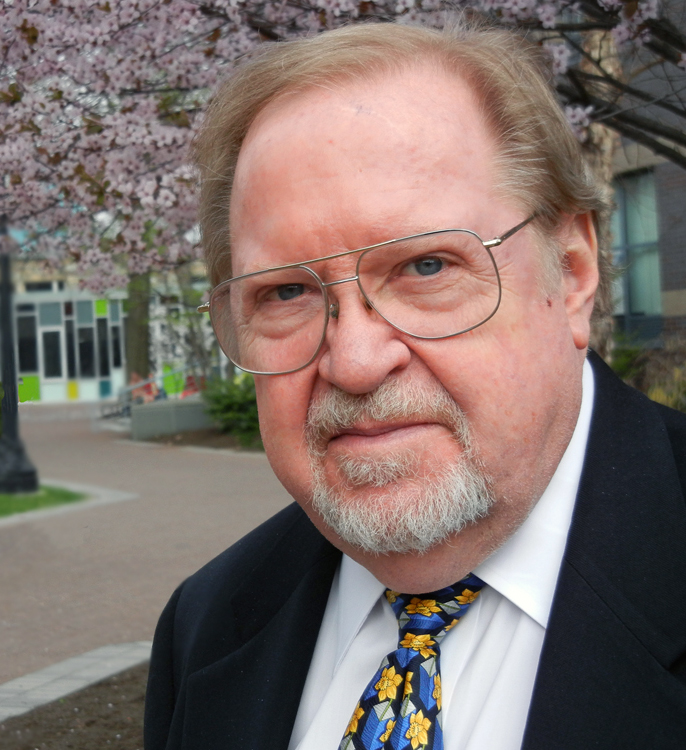
- Born: December 26, 1944
- Died: November 8, 2014 (aged 69)
- Education: Ursinus College
- Occupation: Diplomat

Joseph H. Melrose Jr. (December 26, 1944 – November 8, 2014) was an American diplomat who served as United States Ambassador to Sierra Leone during the final years of the Sierra Leone Civil War. He helped broker the Lomé Peace Accord which brought an end to hostilities, and he worked to expose the role of blood diamonds in financing armed conflict in Africa.

== Career ==
Melrose joined the Foreign Service in 1969 and began with overseas assignments to Vietnam and Syria. He served as Consul General in Karachi, Pakistan when President Zia and U.S. Ambassador Arnold Raphel died in a plane crash, and he was Deputy Chief of Mission in Lagos, Nigeria, from 1995 to 1998. As a career foreign service officer, he held a range of positions, including Executive Director of the Political-Military and Near East and South Asia Bureaus and Vice President of the American Foreign Service Association.

In Sierra Leone, Melrose worked with the Sierra Leonean delegation to get them to agree to the Lomé Peace Talks. Melrose was one of the few diplomats to stay with the US embassy in Freetown after most Americans were evacuated from the capital following the capture of U.N. troops by the RUF.

Melrose was described as "Mr. Fixit" and "the State Department's emergency repairman" by Robert Windrem of NBC News. He headed the Emergency Support Team following the 1998 United States embassy bombings in Nairobi, Kenya, and played a role following the 1983 United States embassy bombing in Beirut. Following his return from Sierra Leone in 2001, he was coordinator for the State Department's post-Sept. 11 Task Force.

He retired from the State Department in 2002 and became professor of politics and international relations at Ursinus College, his alma mater. In his post-foreign service career, he became a Senior Consultant in the Office of the Secretary of State's Coordinator for Counterterrorism and served as the Acting U.S. Representative for Management and Reform to the United Nations at the United States Mission. In late 2006, he became a Senior Advisor to the U.S. Delegation to the 61st U.N. General Assembly, continuing this role in the 62nd and 63rd assemblies. In 2008, he was a Senior Consultant to the UN Special Court for Sierra Leone studying transition plans for the Court.

His awards include the Ursinus College H. Lloyd Jones Award for distinguished advising and mentoring, the Department of State's Distinguished Honor Award and Superior Honor Award, the Secretary of State's Career Achievement Award, and the Presidential Distinguished Service Award. In 2016, Ursinus College announced the establishment of the Melrose Center for Global Civic Engagement in his honor.

Melrose earned a Bachelor of Arts degree from Ursinus College in 1966 and a Master of Arts degree from Temple University in 1969. He received an honorary degree in Democratic and Human Rights studies from Hilla University in Iraq and an honorary Doctor of Laws from Ursinus College. He has also studied at the University of Michigan under a National Science Foundation program.

Diplomatic posts
Preceded by John Lewis Hirsch	United States Ambassador to Sierra Leone; 1998–2001	Succeeded by Peter R. Chaveas
