= Michael A. Samuels =

American diplomat (born 1939-2022)

Michael Anthony Samuels (born 1939) is a non career appointee American Ambassador to Sierra Leone (1975-1979).

Taylor soon left government service only to return as Deputy US Trade Representative and Ambassador to the GATT from early 1986 to mid-1989.

Samuels graduated from Yale University in 1962 with an American Studies major. Desiring to teach in Africa but not feeling qualified, he attended a new program at Columbia University’s Teachers College where he earned a Masters Degree and class room experience in the British educational system. From there, he taught at a school in Northern Nigeria from 1962-1964. Samuels later earned his PhD from Columbia University in African History, writing his dissertation, which focused on Angola, entirely in Portuguese.
