= Leslie M. Alexander =

American Career Foreign Service Officer (born 1948)

Leslie M. Alexander (born November 9, 1948, in Frankfurt, Germany) was an American Career Foreign Service Officer who had Concurrent Appointments as Ambassador Extraordinary and Plenipotentiary to Mauritius and Comoros (1993-1996) and was Ambassador Extraordinary and Plenipotentiary to Ecuador (1996-1999). He also served in Haiti from 1999 to 2000.

Alexander was born to a father from Houston, Texas who was serving in Germany as part of the post World War II occupation and a French mother. He grew up in both Germany and France. Alexander received a bachelor's degree in 1970 from the Munich branch of the University of Maryland. In 1986, he received a master's degree from the US Naval War College.
