= Philip W. Manhard =

American diplomat (1921-1988)

Philip Wallace Manhard (November 13, 1921 Cambridge, Massachusetts - 1988) was the American Ambassador to Mauritius (sworn in on March 19, 1974, Left post on May 10, 1976) and was the first prisoner of war (POW) foreign service officer named as an Ambassador.

Manhard graduated from the University of Southern California in 1943. He served in the United States Navy from 1943 to 1944 and in the Marine Corps from 1944 to 1946. Manhard then worked for IBM and Standard Oil. Manhard joined the foreign service in 1948.

While assigned as Province Senior Adviser in Thừa Thiên Province, South Vietnam, Manhard was taken prisoner by the Viet Cong during the Battle of Huế. He was the highest ranking civilian captured and held as a POW from 31 January 1968 until 16 March 1973).
