= Arlene Render =

American diplomat

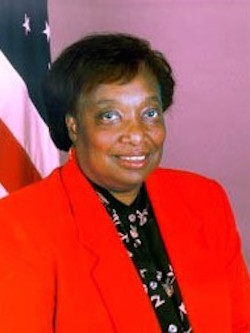

15th United States Ambassador to Ivory Coast
- In office 1 October 2001 – 23 July 2004
- Nominated by: President George W. Bush

United States Ambassador to Zambia
- In office 2 July 1996 – 30 June 1999
- Nominated by: President Bill Clinton

12th United States Ambassador to the Gambia
- In office 22 October 1990 – 8 August 1993
- Nominated by: President George H. W. Bush

Personal details
- Born: August 16, 1943 (age 83) Cleveland, Ohio
- Education: West Virginia State College (B.S.); University of Michigan (M.P.H.)
- Occupation: Diplomat, ambassador

Arlene Render (born August 16, 1943) is an American former diplomat. An officer of the United States Foreign Service, she served as the United States Ambassador to the Gambia, Zambia, and Ivory Coast. She was also noted for her role amidst the initial onset of the Rwandan genocide.

== Biography ==
=== Early life and education ===
Arlene Render was born in Cleveland in 1943. She received a Bachelor of Science from West Virginia State College in 1965 and a Master of Public Health from the University of Michigan in 1967. Her first job was as a health educator for the City of Cleveland.

=== Early career ===
Render joined the United States Foreign Service in 1970, and at the time was one of only 37 African American Foreign Service Officers. A year later, she was sent to Abidjan, the capital of Ivory Coast, to serve as Vice Consul. She remained there until 1973, when she was appointed Vice Consul in Tehran, Iran, and served until 1976. She was then stationed in Genoa, Italy as Consul from 1976 to 1978, and was then sent back to the U.S. to the Bureau of Intelligence and Research to work as a political officer. After a year there, she was assigned to the Bureau of African Affairs to serve as an International Relations Officer, and served in that capacity until 1981. Between 1981 and 1984, Render was Deputy Chief of Mission at the U.S. Embassy to Zaire (now Congo) in Kinshasa, and in 1985 served as Consul General at the U.S. Embassy to Jamaica and the Cayman Islands in Kingston. She then was appointed Deputy Chief of Mission at the U.S. Embassy to Ghana in Accra and held that post from 1986 to 1989.

From 1989 to 1990, she participated in the State Department's Senior Seminar, a professional and educational program that provides Foreign Service Officers the skills needed for advancement in the Foreign Service.

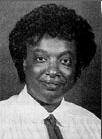
Render in 1990, ten days after her appointment as Ambassador to the Gambia.

=== Ambassador to the Gambia ===
On 3 August 1990, President George H. W. Bush announced his intention to nominate Render to serve as the Ambassador to the Gambia. Hearings were held by the Senate Committee on Foreign Relations on 26 September of that same year, and on 2 October, Chairman Senator Claiborne Pell reported that it was "ordered to be reported favorably." On 2 October the nomination was placed on the Senate Executive Calendar, and on 19 October 1990 was confirmed by the Senate in a unanimous vote.

President Bush officially appointed Rendor the 12th United States Ambassador to the Gambia on 22 October 1990, and she presented her credentials on 31 December of the same year. She held that position until 8 August 1993.

=== Director of Central African Affairs and Rwandan genocide ===
In late 1993, Render assumed the role of Director of the Office of Central African Affairs within the State Department. She became settled in her post only months before the beginning of the 1994 Rwandan genocide, which became the focus of all her efforts and resources.

In Render's first briefing on the situation in the Rwanda and Burundi, the unrest was blamed on "common bandits" who were taking advantage of a weak government and unsettled political climate. On March 24, 1994, she arrived in Burundi and would later travel to Rwanda with Deputy Assistant Secretary of State for African Affairs Prudence Bushnell to support peace efforts. On that first day, Render went to the house of the American Ambassador to Burundi, Robert Krueger, and met with Burundian government officials, all the while shooting was exploding in area around the city.

In 1993, Hutu and Tutsi representatives had signed the Arusha Accords but neither side was fully implementing it. One of the first ways Render and Bushnell addressed the growing tensions was to urge Rwandan Hutu military and police officials to cease broadcasting anti-Tutsi radio messages and renew their focus on providing basic security services, which had become lax. Later, released memos and other documents revealed their frustration with the inaction of both the administration of President Bill Clinton and the United Nations in response to the growing violence. Render and Bushnell expressed their "deep concern over the mounting violence in Rwanda", as well as "the distribution of arms and arms caches." They were also concerned with President Clinton's prior lack of support for the Arusha Accords, and on 25 March 1994, they met with the rebel Rwandan Patriotic Front leaders who "blamed the President for the impasse."

Their peacemaking efforts were futile. Two weeks later, following Render and Bushnell's return from the trip to Burundi and Rwanda the plane carrying Rwandan President Juvénal Habyarimana and Burundian President Cyprien Ntaryamira was shot down as it approached Kigali, effectively kicking off the genocide. In a memo dated 11 April 1994, sent by Render to Assistant Secretary of State for African Affairs George Moose titled "Political Strategy for Rwanda," some noted strategies were to "complete evacuation of all Americans wishing to leave," "urge the [Rwandan Patriotic Front] to agree to a new ceasefire," reaffirm the potential of the Arusha Accords, "monitor the security situation," "if the security situation permits, resume Embassy operations," and "examine options for a confidence-building multilateral military presence of some kind."

On 26 April 1994, Render and U.S. Ambassador to Rwanda David P. Rawson met with Rwandan Ambassador to the United States Uwimana and urged him and the Rwandan government to help stop the massacres. Uwimana claimed that the massacres were acts of self-defense on behalf of the Hutus, and when asked what the United States could do to help stop the killings, he replied that they could "tell the minority Tutsis to accept their status as a minority, and tell the RPF that, although they might win the war, they cannot govern the country." Both Render and Rawson emphasized to the Rwandan Ambassador that "the most crucial priority right now is to stop the massacres." Render made a point of telling him that "the Government of Rwanda and the Army must take on the responsibility of getting the people to stop killing each other," and Uwimana agreed to pass on to the Rwandan Government the United States' "demand for an immediate end to the massacres and establishment of a ceasefire." Again Render's peacemaking efforts were ultimately in vain. From April to July 1994, Hutu extremists in the Rwandan government, military and other armed group killed more than 500,000 Rwandan Tutsis and moderate Hutus.

=== Ambassador to Zambia ===
Render left her position as Director of the Office of Central African Affairs in 1996, when on 13 May President Clinton nominated her to be the U.S. Ambassador to Zambia. On Wednesday, 26 June 1996, her nomination was officially filed. At her Senate Committee on Foreign Relations nomination hearing in June 1996, she strongly criticized violations of the democratic process in Zambia, as well as the Zambian Government's governance, and called for the implementation of democratic values. Her concern was also shared by a member of the Senate Foreign Relations Subcommittee on Africa, Senator Nancy Kassebaum, who wrote to Zambia's president in June raising "serious questions about Zambia's commitment to democracy."

On 2 June 1996, she was officially appointed Ambassador to Zambia, and she presented her credentials on 20 December of the same year. During her years in Zambia, she was noted for playing a role in publicly criticizing many undemocratic policies of then-President of Zambia Frederick Chiluba.

Render was especially vocal on the issue of introducing auditing standards to ensure that American aid would be used only for its intended purposes.

She was also involved in easing political tensions amongst the country's political parties. In January 1998, Render invited former Zambian Vice President Mainza Chona into her home in the Kabulonga neighborhood of Lusaka to talk about the possibility of interparty talks. Chona commented on the meeting, saying

Yes, I had two hours of discussion with the American Ambassador. She had invited me to brief her on current events in the country and the prospects of the interparty talks but I cannot say more than that, that is all I can say.

Even so, some have criticized her effectiveness in her efforts against corruption and human rights abuses in Zambia, claiming that despite the strong stance she presented in her nomination hearing, she had become less vocal in her opposition.

=== Ambassador to Ivory Coast ===
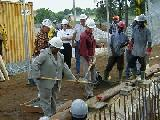
Former Ambassador Render shovels the first dirt from the site of the new U.S. Embassy in Abidjan.

Render left her post as Ambassador to Zambia on 30 June 1999, and in 2001 she was nominated by President Bill Clinton to be the next Ambassador to Ivory Coast (Côte-d'Ivoire). Following a Senate nomination hearing on 19 September 2001 and a vote on 25 September, she was officially appointed on 1 October 2001 as the 15th United States Ambassador to Ivory Coast. She presented her credentials on 9 December 2001.

In Ivory Coast, she coordinated American military protection for foreign nationals when civil war broke out in 2002, and arranged for the evacuation of American citizens who wished to leave. In addition, she worked with the United Nations High Commissioner for Refugees to aid and resettle refugees fleeing from violence in Liberia who had come to live in camps in Ivory Coast. More than 8,000 refugees were resettled in the United States between 2003 and 2005.

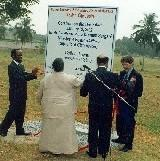
Render dedicates the site of the new embassy in Abidjan.

Render left her position as ambassador on 23 July 2004. She subsequently was asked by President George W. Bush to join his "dream team" for Africa, a trio of African American women, Render, Secretary of State Condoleezza Rice, and Jendayi Fraser, State Department Director of African Affairs. Their purpose was to implement the Bush Administration's foreign policy in Africa, which was driven mainly by security concerns, primarily the global war on terror and the protection of oil supplies.

=== Recent years ===
Render retired from the Foreign Service in 2004 and resides in Alexandria, Virginia. She participates in the American Academy of Diplomacy and in the Thursday Luncheon Group, an African American organization that promotes minority participation in U.S. foreign policy.

In September 2015, Render was one of more than 100 former ambassadors and State Department officials who were signatories of a joint letter sent to President Barack Obama praising the Iran deal.

== Personal life ==
Render is unmarried and has no children.

She speaks French and Italian. She is an avid reader and in 1989 donated $5,000 worth of books to the Gambia's national library, the topics of many of which was the United States.

== Awards and honors ==
Render has received multiple Senior Performance Awards and several Superior and Meritorious Honor Awards from the State Department.

== See also ==
- The Gambia–United States relations
- Ivory Coast–United States relations
- Rwanda–United States relations
- United States–Zambia relations

Diplomatic posts
Preceded by Ruth V. Washington	United States Ambassador to the Gambia; 1990–1993	Succeeded by Andrew J. Winter
Preceded by Roland Karl Kuchel	United States Ambassador to Zambia; 1996–1999	Succeeded by David B. Dunn
Preceded by George Mu	United States Ambassador to Ivory Coast; 2001–2004	Succeeded by Aubrey Hooks
