= List of ambassadors of the United States to the Gambia =

Ambassador of the United States to the Gambia
- Seal of the United States Department of State

- Flag of a United States ambassador
- Incumbent; Laurence Socha since October 14, 2026
- Nominator: The president of the United States
- Appointer: The president; with Senate advice and consent
- Inaugural holder: Mercer Cook as Ambassador Extraordinary and Plenipotentiary
- Formation: May 18, 1965
- Website: U.S. Embassy - Banjul

This is a list of United States ambassadors to the Gambia, the first of who was appointed on May 18, 1965, exactly three months after it attained independence from the United Kingdom.

== Ambassadors ==
Name	Title	Appointed	Presented credentials	Terminated mission	Notes
Mercer Cook (Note: Also accredited to Senegal; resident at Dakar.) - Non-career appointee	Ambassador Extraordinary and Plenipotentiary	May 18, 1965	August 9, 1965	July 1, 1966	
William R. Rivkin - Non-career appointee	Ambassador Extraordinary and Plenipotentiary	October 13, 1966	January 16, 1967	March 19, 1967	Died in office
L. Dean Brown - Career FSO	Ambassador Extraordinary and Plenipotentiary	October 18, 1967	January 18, 1968	August 15, 1970	
G. Edward Clark - Career FSO	Ambassador Extraordinary and Plenipotentiary	October 12, 1970	November 24, 1970	October 16, 1973	
O. Rudolph Aggrey - Career FSO	Ambassador Extraordinary and Plenipotentiary	November 23, 1973	January 17, 1974	July 10, 1977	
Herman J. Cohen - Career FSO	Ambassador Extraordinary and Plenipotentiary	June 24, 1977	March 29, 1978	July 21, 1980	
Larry Gordon Piper - Career FSO	Ambassador Extraordinary and Plenipotentiary	June 30, 1980	August 21, 1980	August 23, 1982	
Owen W. Roberts	Chargé d'Affaires ad interim	August 23, 1982		June 1983	
P. Wesley Kriebel	Chargé d'Affaires ad interim	July 1983		November 1983	
Alan Logan	Chargé d'Affaires ad interim	November 1983		April 1984	
Edward Brynn	Chargé d'Affaires ad interim	May 1984		June 20, 1984	
Robert Thomas Hennemeyer - Career FSO	Ambassador Extraordinary and Plenipotentiary	May 11, 1984	June 20, 1984	June 27, 1986	
Herbert E. Horowitz - Career FSO	Ambassador Extraordinary and Plenipotentiary	September 12, 1986	October 24, 1986	November 4, 1989	
Jimmie Stone	Chargé d'Affaires ad interim	November 4, 1989		January 1990	
A. Donald Bramante	Chargé d'Affaires ad interim	January 1990		December 31, 1990	
Arlene Render - Career FSO	Ambassador Extraordinary and Plenipotentiary	October 22, 1990	December 31, 1990	August 8, 1993	
Andrew J. Winter - Career FSO	Ambassador Extraordinary and Plenipotentiary	July 11, 1993	October 29, 1993	May 31, 1995	
Gerald W. Scott - Career FSO	Ambassador Extraordinary and Plenipotentiary	December 28, 1995	February 16, 1996	June 27, 1998	
George Williford Boyce Haley - Political appointee	Ambassador Extraordinary and Plenipotentiary	June 29, 1998	October 15, 1998	July 14, 2001	
Jackson McDonald - Career FSO	Ambassador Extraordinary and Plenipotentiary	October 1, 2001	November 29, 2001	May 26, 2004	
Joseph D. Stafford III - Career FSO	Ambassador Extraordinary and Plenipotentiary	July 2, 2004	September 15, 2004	June 5, 2007	
Barry L. Wells - Political appointee	Ambassador Extraordinary and Plenipotentiary	October 29, 2007	February 13, 2008	May 13, 2009	
Pamela Ann White – Career FSO	Ambassador Extraordinary and Plenipotentiary	October 1, 2010	November 29, 2010	June 2, 2012	
Edward M. Alford – Career FSO	Ambassador Extraordinary and Plenipotentiary	July 5, 2012	November 5, 2012	July 28, 2013	
Patricia Alsup – Career FSO	Ambassador Extraordinary and Plenipotentiary	October 15, 2015	January 13, 2016	September 18, 2018	
Richard Carlton Paschall III - Career FSO	Ambassador Extraordinary and Plenipotentiary	January 2, 2019	April 9, 2019	February 15, 2022	
Sharon L. Cromer – Career FSO	Ambassador Extraordinary and Plenipotentiary	December 18, 2021	March 18, 2022	August 21, 2025	
Robert Anderson – Career FSO	Chargé d'Affaires ad interim	August 22, 2025		October 14, 2025	
Eugene S. Young – Career FSO	Chargé d'Affaires ad interim	October 14, 2025		June 15, 2026	
Robert Anderson – Career FSO	Chargé d'Affaires ad interim	June 15, 2026		October 6, 2026	
Laurence Socha – Career FSO	Ambassador Extraordinary and Plenipotentiary	August 7, 2026	October 14, 2026	Present	

== See also ==
- The Gambia–United States relations
- Foreign relations of the Gambia
- Ambassadors of the United States
