= Alsup =

Alsup is a surname. Notable people with the surname include:

- Bill Alsup (1938–2016), American race car driver
- Patricia Alsup (born 1961), American diplomat
- Todd Alsup (born 1978), American pianist and singer-songwriter
- William Alsup (born 1945), United States federal judge
