= Donald Booth =

Donald Booth may refer to:

- Donald E. Booth (born 1952), American diplomat
- Donald Prentice Booth (1902–1993), U.S. Army general
