= David P. Rawson =

American diplomat (1941–2020)

David Rawson
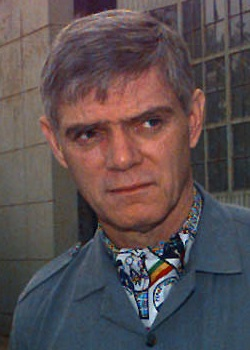
- David Rawson in February 1997
- Born: David Paul Rawson; September 10, 1941; Addison, Michigan, U.S.
- Died: September 16, 2020 (aged 79); Newberg, Oregon, U.S.
- Education: Malone College (B.A.); American University (M.A., PhD)
- Occupation(s): Diplomat, Professor

David Paul Rawson (September 10, 1941 – September 16, 2020) was an American diplomat who served as the United States ambassador to Rwanda and Mali, and as chargé d'affaires in Somalia. His service in Rwanda occurred during the Genocide against the Tutsi in 1994.

== Early life and education ==
Rawson was born in Addison, Michigan as the son of missionaries. In 1947 he moved to Burundi with his parents, where his father ran a medical clinic.

In 1958, Rawson returned to the United States and attended Malone College (B.A.) and American University (M.A. and Ph.D.). After completing his Ph.D., he returned to Malone College and taught for six years before joining the United States Department of State. Rawson also received a postdoctoral grant to investigate the relationship between the political situation and religious culture in the countries of Rwanda and Burundi.

== Career ==
From 1986 to 1988, Rawson was a deputy chief of mission at the U.S. Embassy in Somalia, and from 1989-1991, he was director of the Office of West African Affairs within the State Department's Bureau of African Affairs.

From 1993 to 1996, Rawson served as U.S. ambassador to Rwanda, a nation then experiencing ethnic tensions between the Hutus and Tutsis. When the plane of Rwandan president Juvénal Habyarimana, a Hutu, was shot down, the Hutus blamed it on the Tutsis, leading to a genocide between April and July 1994. The United States government ordered American officials, including Rawson, to leave the country.

After the Rwandan Patriotic Front took control of the government in July 1994, Rawson returned to his post in Kigali. Rawson later stated, however, that he believed he failed in his role as a peacemaker during his tenure as ambassador.

From 1996 to 1999, Rawson served as U.S. ambassador to Mali.

== Post-diplomatic career ==
After retiring from the State Department in 1999, Rawson moved to Michigan and taught at Spring Arbor University and Hillsdale College.

After 2018, Rawson lived in Oregon and taught at George Fox University. He donated his personal archives to the university, including declassified documents used in the research of his book Prelude to Genocide: Arusha, Rwanda, and the Failure of Diplomacy.

== Personal life ==
Rawson's first wife Viola Mosher died in an automobile accident in 1977. He was in the vehicle at the time of the crash and stated that this incident was the "most trying circumstance" of his life".

Rawson was a Christian. Rawson lived in Newberg, Oregon until his death on September 16, 2020.

== See also ==
- List of ambassadors of the United States to Rwanda
- List of ambassadors of the United States to Mali
- Rwandan genocide
- Rwandan Civil War

Diplomatic posts
Preceded by Robert A. Flaten	U.S. Ambassador to Rwanda; 1994–96	Succeeded by Robert E. Gribbin, 3rd
Preceded by Carolee Heileman	U.S. Ambassador to Mali; 1996–99	Succeeded by Michael Ranneberger
