= United States–Zambia relations =

- United States: Zambia

The diplomatic relationship between the United States and Zambia can be characterized as warm and cooperative. Relations are based on their shared experiences as British colonies, both before, after and during the struggle for independence. Several U.S. administrations cooperated closely with Zambia's first president, Kenneth Kaunda, in hopes of facilitating solutions to the conflicts in Rhodesia (Zimbabwe), Angola, and Namibia. The United States works closely with the Zambian Government to defeat the HIV/AIDS pandemic that is ravaging Zambia, to promote economic growth and development, and to effect political reform needed to promote responsive and responsible government. The United States is also supporting the government's efforts to root out corruption. Zambia is a beneficiary of the African Growth and Opportunity Act (AGOA). The U.S. Government provides a variety of technical assistance and other support that is managed by the Department of State, U.S. Agency for International Development, Millennium Challenge Account (MCA) Threshold Program, Centers for Disease Control and Prevention, Department of Treasury, Department of Defense, and Peace Corps. The majority of U.S. assistance is provided through the President's Emergency Plan for AIDS Relief (PEPFAR), in support of the fight against HIV/AIDS.

In addition to supporting development projects, the United States has provided considerable emergency food aid during periods of drought and flooding through the World Food Programme (WFP) and is a major contributor to refugee programs in Zambia through the UN High Commission for Refugees and other agencies.

According to the 2012 U.S. Global Leadership Report, 59% of Zambians approve of U.S. leadership, with 30% disapproving and 11% uncertain.

On 14 October 2020, the US government pledged to implement a five-year development assistance and program in Zambia worth $1.9 billion. The five-year strategy is said to focus on education, health, economic development, and democratic governance.

== U.S. Agency for International Development (USAID) ==
In 2007, U.S. assistance to Zambia exceeded $259 million. USAID's program in Zambia included over $116 million for HIV/AIDS programs utilizing PEPFAR funding and $11 million to fight corruption and increase trade under the MCA Threshold Program. In addition to programs funded through PEPFAR, the President's Malaria Initiative, and the Millennium Challenge Account Threshold Program, USAID's program in Zambia supported training and technical assistance to promote economic growth through trade and investment; create health and educational opportunities to improve lives; and reduce the impact of HIV/AIDS through multi-sectoral responses.

== Peace Corps ==
A country agreement inviting the Peace Corps to work in Zambia was signed by the United States and Zambia on September 14, 1993. The first group of volunteers was sworn in on April 7, 1994. The Peace Corps program in Zambia has continued to increase with more than 200 American volunteers working to promote sustainable development through their activities in agricultural and natural resource management, health and sanitation, rural education, and humanitarian assistance. Volunteers are working in all of Zambia's nine provinces to build the local capacity to manage family fish farms, develop an innovative paradigm via appropriate technologies, to promote food security and promote positive resource management practices, to implement health reforms at the village level, to promote and support rural education, and to extend HIV/AIDS education and prevention efforts through full participation in PEPFAR. Volunteers live primarily in rural villages in remote parts of the country without running water, electricity, or other amenities. Peace Corps Zambia has one of the highest rates of extension (third-year volunteers) and enjoys successful partnerships with many other aid organizations in Zambia.

== Principal U.S. officials ==
- Ambassador—Michael C. Gonzales
- Deputy Chief of Mission—Linnisa Wahid
- Public Affairs Officer—Phil Dimon
- Political/Economic Section Chief—John Gray
- Consular Officer—Sean Robinson
- Defense Attaché—Tony Stibral
- Centers for Disease Control and Prevention—Genessa Giorgi
- USAID Mission Director—Sheryl Stumbras
- Peace Corps Director—Brad Favor

== Diplomatic missions ==
The U.S. Embassy in Zambia is in Lusaka. The United States established diplomatic relations with Zambia in 1964, following its independence from the United Kingdom. Zambia saw single-party rule from independence until 1973, when it formally became a one-party state. In 1991, Zambia began adopting multi-party democracy and a more liberalized economy. Zambia’s economic growth has not benefited the many rural and urban Zambians who continue to live in poverty. The Zambian government is pursuing a national development plan to reduce the economy’s reliance on the copper industry. The country’s primary challenges are to improve governance issues; restore debt sustainability, promote broad-based, inclusive economic growth; maintain adherence to democratic and constitutional principles; create employment; and develop its human capital.

The United States and Zambia enjoy cordial relations. U.S. goals in Zambia include reducing widespread poverty and building and sustaining a democratic, well-governed country that contributes positively to regional stability. The United States works closely with the Zambian government to defeat the HIV/AIDS pandemic that is widespread but stabilizing in Zambia, to promote economic growth and development, and to bring about political reform by promoting democratic principles and a responsible and responsive government.

== 2019 ambassador recall ==
In December 2019, the United States was reported to have recalled its ambassador to Zambia after he spoke out publicly against the conviction of two men who were sentenced to prison in Zambia for consensual same-sex sexual activity. Then-President of Zambia Edgar Lungu declared Ambassador Daniel Lewis Foote persona non grata because he had criticized the verdict while accusing Zambia of not actively persecuting misappropriation of donor aid.

== See also ==
- Zambian Americans
- Foreign relations of Zambia
- Foreign relations of the United States
