= Robert Good =

Robert Good may refer to:

- Robert A. Good (1922–2003), American physician
- Robert C. Good (died 1984), American diplomat
- Bob Good (Robert Good, born 1965), United States Representative from Virginia
