= Herbert E. Horowitz =

American diplomat (1930–2019)

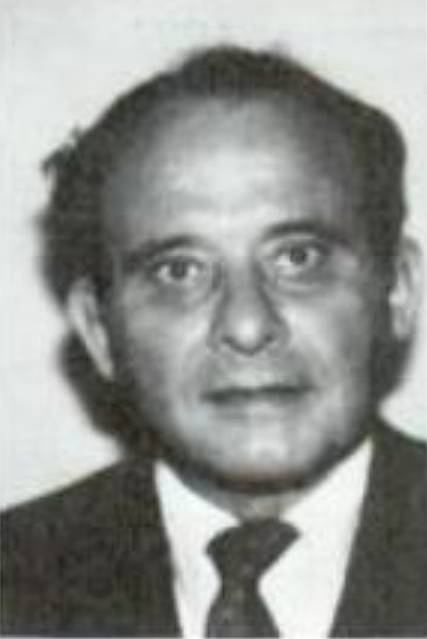

United States Ambassador to the Gambia
- In office October 24, 1986 – November 4, 1989
- President: Ronald Reagan; George H. W. Bush
- Preceded by: Robert Thomas Hennemeyer
- Succeeded by: Ruth V. Washington

Personal details
- Born: July 10, 1930 Brooklyn, New York, United States
- Died: March 2, 2019 (aged 88) Pasadena, California, United States
- Spouse: Lenore Horowitz
- Children: Jason and Richard
- Education: Alfred University, Brooklyn College, Columbia University, Tufts University
- Profession: Diplomat

Herbert Eugene Horowitz (July 10, 1930 – March 2, 2019) was a career member of the Senior Foreign Service, Class of Minister-Counselor, American Ambassador to The Gambia from 1986 to 1989, consul general in Sydney, Australia from 1981 to 1984, and deputy chief of mission at the Embassy in Beijing, China from 1984 to 1986.

== Biography ==
Horowitz grew up in Crown Heights, Brooklyn and graduated from Boys High School (Brooklyn). He attended Alfred University for two years before transferring to Brooklyn College (B.A., 1952). He went on to earn a M.A. in 1964 from Columbia University and M.A. in 1965 from the Fletcher School of Law and Diplomacy.

Horowitz joined the Foreign Service in 1956 and was assigned as economic officer at the Embassy in Taipei, Taiwan. He returned Washington in 1962 to become economic officer, Office of East Asia and China Affairs.

A resident of Washington, DC, Horowitz was visiting his son in California when he died of a stroke in California.
