= Carmen Maria Martinez =

American diplomat

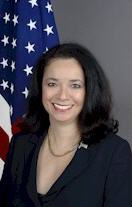
Carmen M. Martinez. U.S. State Dep't photo, 2005

Carmen Maria Martinez (born 1950) is a United States diplomat and a career foreign service officer. She served as the United States Ambassador to Zambia from 2005 to 2008. Prior to that assignment, she was the Chargé d'Affaires ad interim to Burma from August 2002 to August 2005. Burma had no U.S. ambassador from 1990 until 2012, so Martinez, as chargé d'affaires, was the senior diplomat in the embassy and the head of the mission.

Diplomatic posts
Preceded by Priscilla A. Clapp	Chargé d'Affaires ad interim to Burma; 2002–2005	Succeeded by Sharon E. Villarosa
Preceded by Martin George Brennan	United States Ambassador to Zambia; 2005–2008	Succeeded by Donald E. Booth
