= Peter H. Vrooman =

American diplomat (born 1966)

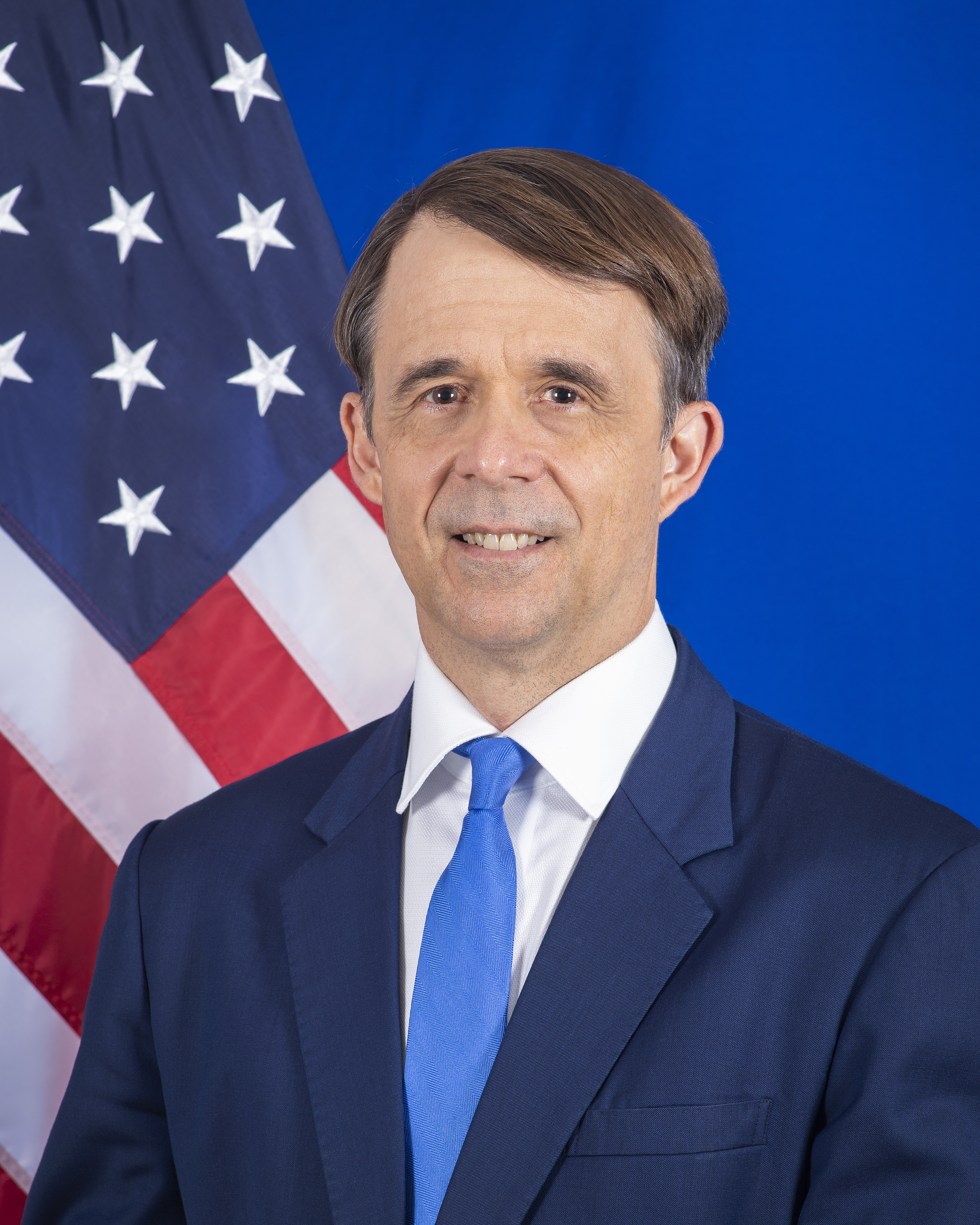

United States Ambassador to Mozambique
- In office March 3, 2022 – May 29, 2025
- President: Joe Biden; Donald Trump
- Preceded by: Dennis Walter Hearne

United States Ambassador to Rwanda
- In office April 7, 2018 – January 24, 2022
- President: Donald Trump; Joe Biden
- Preceded by: Erica Barks-Ruggles
- Succeeded by: Eric W. Kneedler

Personal details
- Born: March 1, 1966 (age 60) Canton, New York, U.S.
- Spouse: Johnette Iris Stubbs
- Children: 2
- Education: Harvard College (BA); Dwight D. Eisenhower School for National Security and Resource Strategy (MS)

Peter Hendrick Vrooman (born March 1, 1966) is an American diplomat who had served as the United States ambassador to Mozambique. He previously served as the United States ambassador to Rwanda from 2018 to 2022.

== Education ==
Vrooman received a Bachelor of Arts degree in Social Studies from Harvard College. He received his Master of Science degree from the Dwight D. Eisenhower School for National Security and Resource Strategy.

== Career ==
Vrooman is a career member of the Senior Foreign Service, with the rank of minister-counselor serving since 1991. He previously served as the U.S. ambassador to Rwanda. Vrooman also served as the Chargé d’Affaires and deputy chief of mission of the U.S. embassy in Addis Ababa, Ethiopia. Other assignments include the spokesperson for the U.S. embassy in New Delhi; director for Iraq on the staff of the White House National Security Council in Washington, D.C.; and deputy political counselor in Tel Aviv and at the U.S. Mission to the United Nations. U.S. embassy assignments include Baghdad, Beirut, and Djibouti, as well as the U.S. Liaison Office in Mogadishu, Somalia. Vrooman was a watch officer in the Department of State Operations Center and the desk officer for Algeria in the Bureau of Near Eastern Affairs. Prior to joining the Foreign Service, he worked as the special assistant to the President of the American University in Cairo.

=== United States ambassador to Rwanda ===
On October 30, 2017, President Donald Trump nominated Vrooman to serve as the United States ambassador to Rwanda. Hearings on his nomination were held before the Senate Foreign Relations Committee on December 19, 2017. The committee reported his nomination favorably on February 7, 2018. On February 15, 2018, the Senate confirmed his nomination by voice vote. Vrooman's mission ended around January 24, 2022.

=== United States ambassador to Mozambique ===
On July 27, 2021, President Joe Biden nominated Vrooman to be the next United States ambassador to Mozambique. His nomination was sent to the Senate the following day. The Senate Foreign Relations Committee held hearings on his nomination on October 20, 2021. The committee reported his nomination favorably on November 3, 2021. The entire Senate confirmed his nomination on December 18, 2021 by voice vote. He was sworn into office on February 11, 2022. He presented his credentials to President Filipe Nyusi on March 3, 2022.

== Personal life ==
Vrooman is a native of New York. He is married to Johnette Iris Stubbs, a photographer, and they have a son and a daughter. He speaks Arabic and French.

== See also ==
- Ambassadors of the United States
- List of ambassadors appointed by Donald Trump

Diplomatic posts
| Preceded by Erica Barks-Ruggles | United States Ambassador to Rwanda; 2018–2022 | Succeeded by Eric W. Kneedler |
| Preceded by Dennis Walter Hearne | United States Ambassador to Mozambique; 2022–2025 | Vacant |
