= Drew Christiansen =

Jesuit priest and university professor (1945–2022)

The Reverend Drew Christiansen SJ

Orders
- Ordination: 1972

Personal details
- Born: February 20, 1945 Staten Island, New York, U.S.
- Died: April 6, 2022 (aged 77) Washington, DC, U.S.
- Denomination: Roman Catholic
- Residence: Wolfington Hall, Georgetown University (Jesuit Residence)
- Occupation: Jesuit priest, university professor, editor
- Education: Yale University, Woodstock College, Fordham University

Andrew Joseph Christiansen SJ (February 20, 1945 – April 6, 2022) was an American Jesuit priest and author. He was Distinguished Professor of Ethics and Human Development at the Georgetown University Walsh School of Foreign Service, a senior fellow at the Berkley Center for Religion, Peace, and World Affairs, and the former editor-in-chief of the Jesuit magazine America. His areas of research included nuclear disarmament, nonviolence and just peacemaking, Catholic social teaching, and ecumenical public advocacy.

== Early life and education ==
Christiansen, of Danish and Italian descent, grew up in Staten Island, New York. He earned his Ph.D. (1982), M.Phil., and M.A. from Yale University; an S.T.M. and M.Div. from Woodstock College. He was twice a fellow at the Woodstock Theological Center, Washington, D.C. (1977–1980, 1998–2002), serving as the center's acting director in 2002. His undergraduate degree, A. B., was from Fordham University.

An active outdoorsman from his youth to middle age, he loved camping, hiking, and spending as much time as possible in the natural world. Even when his health could no longer sustain long trips, he made excursions around the park-like parts of campus with friends. Beyond these adventures, he was also enthusiastic about gardening, birds, poetry, and Italian cooking.

== Academic, editorial, ecumenical, and diplomatic work ==
=== United States Conference of Catholic Bishops ===
From 1991 to 1998 he led the Office of International Justice and Peace, what he then described as the "social policy arm of the Roman Catholic bishops of the United States," when it was called the United States Catholic Conference (USCC). In 1991 for the pastoral "Renewing the Earth," Christiansen served as lead advisor. This writing and research formed a basis for his future work and commentary on the environment. In 1993 he was lead staff member for "The Harvest of Justice Is Sown In Peace," a landmark peace pastoral which established the foundation for the USCCB's policies after the Cold War. From 1998 to 2004 he was counselor for International Affairs.

=== Consultant to the Vatican ===
He was a frequent consultant to the Holy See on issues that included nuclear disarmament. He also served on the Holy See delegation that participated in the negotiation of the Treaty on the Prohibition of Nuclear Weapons during the summer of 2017. After Pope Francis, under the direction of Cardinal Peter Turkson, hosted a conference—Prospects for a World Free from Nuclear Weapons and for Integral Disarmament—at the Vatican in November 2017. Christiansen produced two books based on it, at the direct request of the Holy See.

=== Work in the Middle East, Ecumenical Dialogue ===
At the bishops' conference he became more interested in the Middle East. He worked with Michel Sabbah, the emeritus Latin Patriarch of Jerusalem for many years, and wrote an introduction to his book. Sabbah named Christiansen a Canon of the Holy Sepulchre of Jerusalem. He was also a member of the Atlantic Council's Middle East Task Force, as part of his ongoing work in the region.

In broader ecumenical efforts, Christiansen served as a consultant to the Pontifical Council for Promoting Christian Unity for the Mennonite-Catholic Dialogue, honoring Mennonites as members of the historic Peace Churches. In a common concluding statement at the Mennonite World Conference 2000, the Catholic and Mennonite participants agreed that "the church is called to live as an efficacious sign and an instrument of peace overcoming every form of enmity and to reconcile all peoples in the peace of Christ".

=== Editor-in-chief of America magazine ===
He served at this national Jesuit publication based in Manhattan, later restyled as America: The Jesuit Review, for 10 years from 2002 to 2012. For the last seven years, from 2005 to 2012, he was editor-in-chief, succeeding Thomas J. Reese SJ, and he oversaw the magazine's 100th anniversary. After Matt Malone SJ succeeded him as editor-in-chief in 2012, he returned to Georgetown University.

During his tenure as editor-in-chief, he exhorted James J. Martin SJ to travel to the Holy Land for a planned book, Jesus: A Pilgrimage. Martin recalled Christiansen's inspiration for the book both in an article for America and in a homily. The book became a Christopher-award-winning, New York Times bestseller. On April 20, 2022, Martin offered the homily at Christiansen's funeral at Holy Trinity Catholic Church in Washington, D.C., the Jesuit parish church next to Georgetown University, accompanying the celebrant, G. Ronald Murphy SJ, and he remembered the incident with great affection and credit to his friend.

=== University distinguished professor ===
In 2013, Christiansen returned to Georgetown University in a full-time role as a senior fellow at the Berkley Center for Religion, Peace, and World Affairs and Distinguished Professor of Ethics and Human Development in the School of Foreign Service, posts he held until his death. He continued to advise students and oversee his final book until April 2022. Previously, sometimes between earlier periods of service at Georgetown University, he was associate professor of theology and staff fellow of the Kroc Institute for International Peace Studies at the University of Notre Dame (1986–1990), where he was a member of the founding team. At the Jesuit School of Theology/Graduate Theological Union-Berkeley (now the Jesuit School of Theology of Santa Clara University), from 1981 to 1986, he was assistant professor of social ethics. Additionally, from 1982 to 1986, he was director of its Center for Ethics and Social Policy. The majority of his academic career was spent at Georgetown University.

=== Pastoral care of older adults ===
Christiansen had a deep personal interest in the pastoral needs of people in residential nursing facilities or aging in place at home, and he visited those in long-term care when he was able, hearing confessions and celebrating the Eucharist. His 1982 doctoral dissertation at Yale was titled "Autonomy and Dependence in Old Age: An Ethical Analysis" under the direction of Sister Margaret Farley R.S.M., and he retained a lifelong attentiveness to people experiencing issues attendant with such care.

== Death ==
Christiansen died on April 6, 2022, in Washington, DC, aged 77. His date of death was the 113th anniversary of America magazine's founding. As the date was so close to Easter, the Jesuits followed their long custom of waiting until after Easter, in this case April 20, to hold the funeral and burial. He was survived by an older brother, Phil Christiansen.

His death followed a long period of physical challenges over several years, during which time he had kept up an ambitious schedule, because he thrived on writing, editing, prayer, Mass, visiting the sick and older people, teaching, lecturing, reading, and enjoying lively interaction with colleagues, students, and the printed page. 2022 marked his 50th year as a priest and his 60th as a Jesuit, but he did not live to see either anniversary. Jesuits typically enter the society in August on Entrance Day, and ordination is a decade or more later, usually in June. His final book was complete, and in the copy-editing stage at the publisher.

== Awards and recognition ==
- 1996: For his service to the Holy Land, Michel Sabbah, who held the Latin Patriarchate of Jerusalem from 1987 to 2008, named Christiansen a Canon of the Holy Sepulchre.
- 2003: Manhattan College Peace Studies Award.
- 2021: Christiansen's penultimate book A World Free from Nuclear Weapons: The Vatican Conference on Disarmament took second place in the Catholic Media Association Awards in the category of Morality, Ethics, Christology, Mariology, and Redemption.
- He met Pope John Paul II, Pope Benedict XVI, and Pope Francis.

== Publications ==
=== Books ===
- Drew Christiansen SJ and Carole Sargent, eds. Forbidden: Receiving Pope Francis' Condemnation of Nuclear Weapons (Georgetown University Press, 2023).
- Drew Christiansen SJ and Carole Sargent, eds. A World Free from Nuclear Weapons: The Vatican Conference on Disarmament (Georgetown University Press, 2020).
- William Bole, Drew Christiansen SJ, and Robert Hennemeyer, Forgiveness in International Politics: An Alternative Road to Peace (USCCB Publishing, 2004); French translation, Le Pardon en Politique Internationale: Un Autre Chemin Vers la Paix (2007)
- Drew Christiansen SJ and Walter Grazer, eds., And God Saw That it was Good : Catholic Theology and the Environment (United States Catholic Conference, 1996).
- Drew Christiansen SJ, Gerard F. Powers, and Robert Thomas Hennemeyer, Peacemaking: Moral and Policy Challenges for a New World (United States Catholic Conference, 1994).

=== Introductions to books ===
- Roger Bergman, with a foreword by Drew Christiansen SJ, Preventing Unjust War: A Catholic Argument for Selective Conscientious Objection (Cascade Books, 2020).
- Barry Hudock, with an introduction by Drew Christiansen SJ, Struggle, Condemnation, Vindication: John Courtney Murray's Journey toward Vatican II (Liturgical Press, 2015).
- Patriarch Michel Sabbah, edited and with an introduction by Drew Christiansen SJ and Saliba Sarsar, foreword by Cardinal Theodore E. McCarrick, Faithful Witness: On Reconciliation and Peace in the Holy Land (New City Press, 2008).

=== Articles ===
Over 150 articles (TK) on moral theology, ethics, international affairs, armed conflict, peace, the environment, Catholic social teaching and aging, including his America work, and a longstanding role as an international correspondent for the Jesuits' Rome publication La Civiltà Cattolica. He had begun writing on nuclear disarmament for The Conversation.

Some of his significant articles include "Metaphysics and Society: A Commentary on Caritas in Veritate" (Theological Studies, March 2010) and "The Ethics of Peacemaking," (Journal of Ecumenical Studies, Summer 2010). Other articles appeared in Popoli (Italy), Projet and Christus (France), Razon y Fe (Spain), Mensaje (Chile), Faith in International Affairs, Ecumenical Trends, and Seminary Journal (USA).
