= Mark C. Storella =

American diplomat

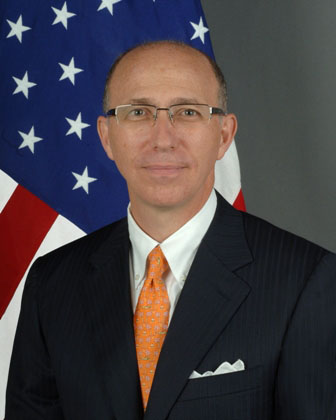
Mark C. Storella

Mark C. Storella (born 1959) is an American diplomat. He is a graduate of Roxbury Latin School, Harvard College, and Fletcher School of Law and Diplomacy. He was Dean of the Leadership and Management School at the Foreign Service Institute (FSI) as of May 28, 2019. Storella was U.S. Ambassador to Zambia from 2010 to 2013.

Storella is considered a member of the Senior Foreign Service. Prior to becoming a Dean at the FSI, was the Senior State Department Fellow at the Institute for the Study of Diplomacy at Georgetown University. From 2016 to 2018, he was Deputy Assistant Secretary of State in the Bureau of Population, Refugees, and Migration. He was the Deputy Chief of Mission at the Embassy in Brussels from 2013 to 2016. Storella was Deputy Permanent Representative to UN organizations in Geneva (2007-2009) and Deputy Chief of Mission in Cambodia (2003-2006).

In 2020, Storella, along with over 130 other former Republican national security officials, signed a statement that asserted that President Trump was unfit to serve another term, and "To that end, we are firmly convinced that it is in the best interest of our nation that Vice President Joe Biden be elected as the next President of the United States, and we will vote for him."

== Awards ==
Besides several State Department Superior and Meritorious Honor awards, he was awarded the Thomas Jefferson Award presented by American Citizens Abroad and the Centers for Disease Control and Prevention's Excellence in Service Award.

== Publications ==
- 'Drugs and thugs' diplomacy, The Christian Science Monitor May 8, 2002 link to article
- 'All refugees are created equal — but they aren't treated that way', Boston Globe, June 20, 2023 link to article

Diplomatic posts
Preceded by Donald E. Booth	United States Ambassador to Zambia; 2010–2014	Succeeded by Eric T. Schultz
