= Robert E. Fritts =

American diplomat

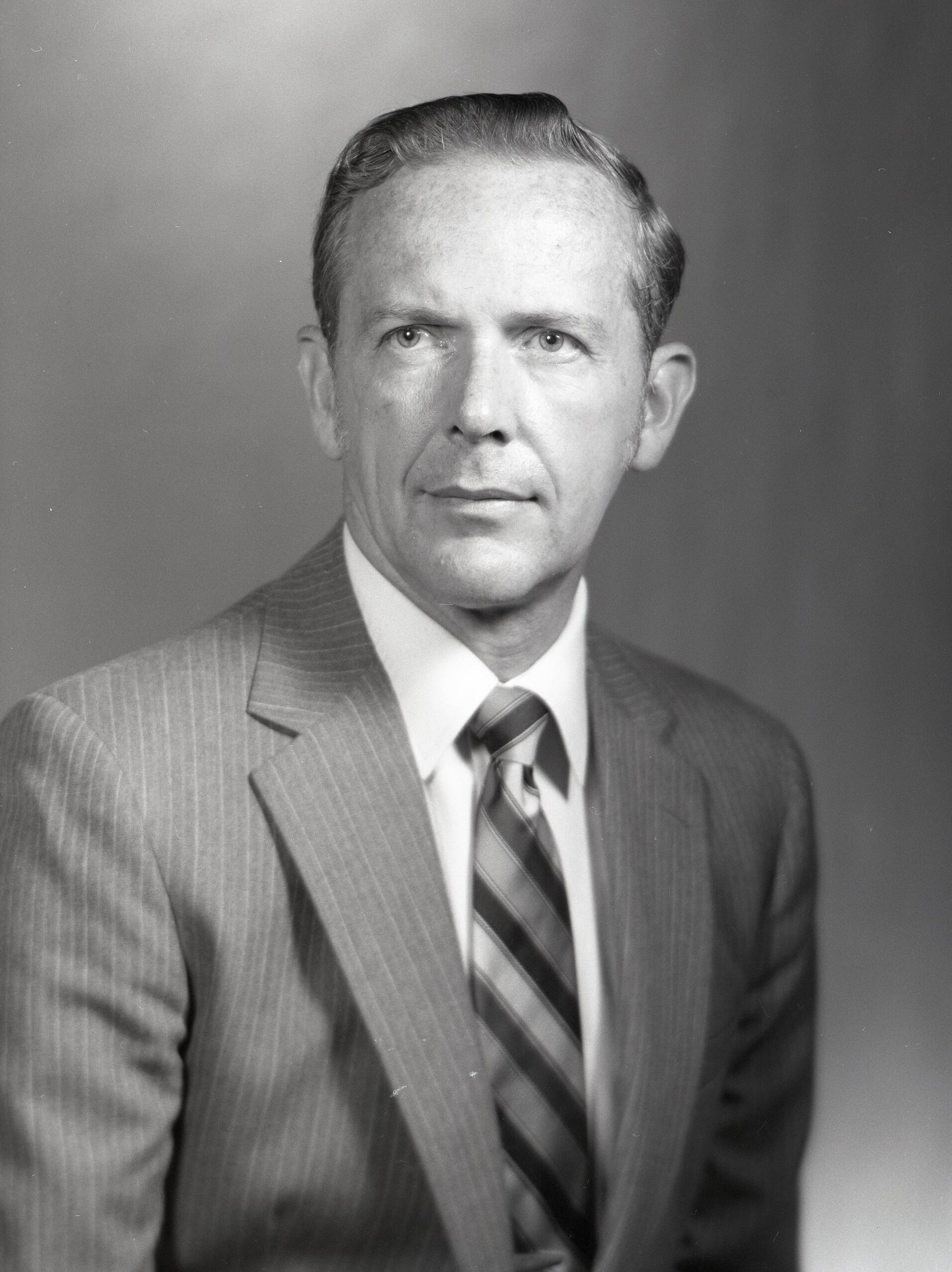

United States Ambassador to Ghana
- In office July 6, 1983 – June 2, 1986
- President: Ronald Reagan
- Preceded by: Thomas W.M. Smith
- Succeeded by: Stephen R. Lyne

United States Ambassador to Rwanda
- In office February 28, 1974 – June 18, 1976
- Preceded by: Robert Foster Corrigan
- Succeeded by: T. Frank Crigler

Personal details
- Born: May 3, 1934 Chicago, Illinois, U.S.
- Died: September 28, 2015 (aged 81) Williamsburg, Virginia, U.S.

Robert Eugene Fritts (May 3, 1934 – September 28, 2015) was an American diplomat and Foreign Service Officer. At the time of his appointment as U.S. ambassador to Rwanda at age 39, was the youngest ever ambassador in the Foreign Service. He later served as the U.S. ambassador to Ghana.

Born in Chicago, he was raised in Oak Park, Illinois. After graduating from the University of Michigan with a major in political science with a focus on international relations, Fritts served as a Navy officer on destroyers before entering the U.S. Foreign Service in 1959. After his retirement in 1991, he moved to Williamsburg and taught at the College of William & Mary and was a senior fellow with the Joint Forces Staff College in Norfolk, Virginia. In 2015, he died of lung cancer.

== Foreign Service career ==
When nominated to be ambassador to Rwanda, he was serving as deputy chief of mission in Khartoum, Sudan, where he “arrived the day of the murder of Ambassador Noel and DCM George Curtis Moore and distinguished himself in the handling of the difficult situation there in the aftermath of the assassinations”. His résumé includes international relations officer in the Bureau of European Affairs, economic-commercial officer in Luxembourg, followed by Japanese language and area studies at the Foreign Service Institute. He went on to posts as economic officer in Tokyo, economic-commercial officer, Bureau of East Asian and Pacific Affairs, and deputy director, Office of Japanese Affairs, Bureau of East Asian and Pacific Affairs. He was assigned to Jakarta, Indonesia, as economic officer and in 1973 became deputy chief of mission in Khartoum, Sudan.
