= List of ambassadors of the United States to Mozambique =

Ambassador of the United States to Mozambique
- Seal of the United States Department of State

- Flag of a United States ambassador

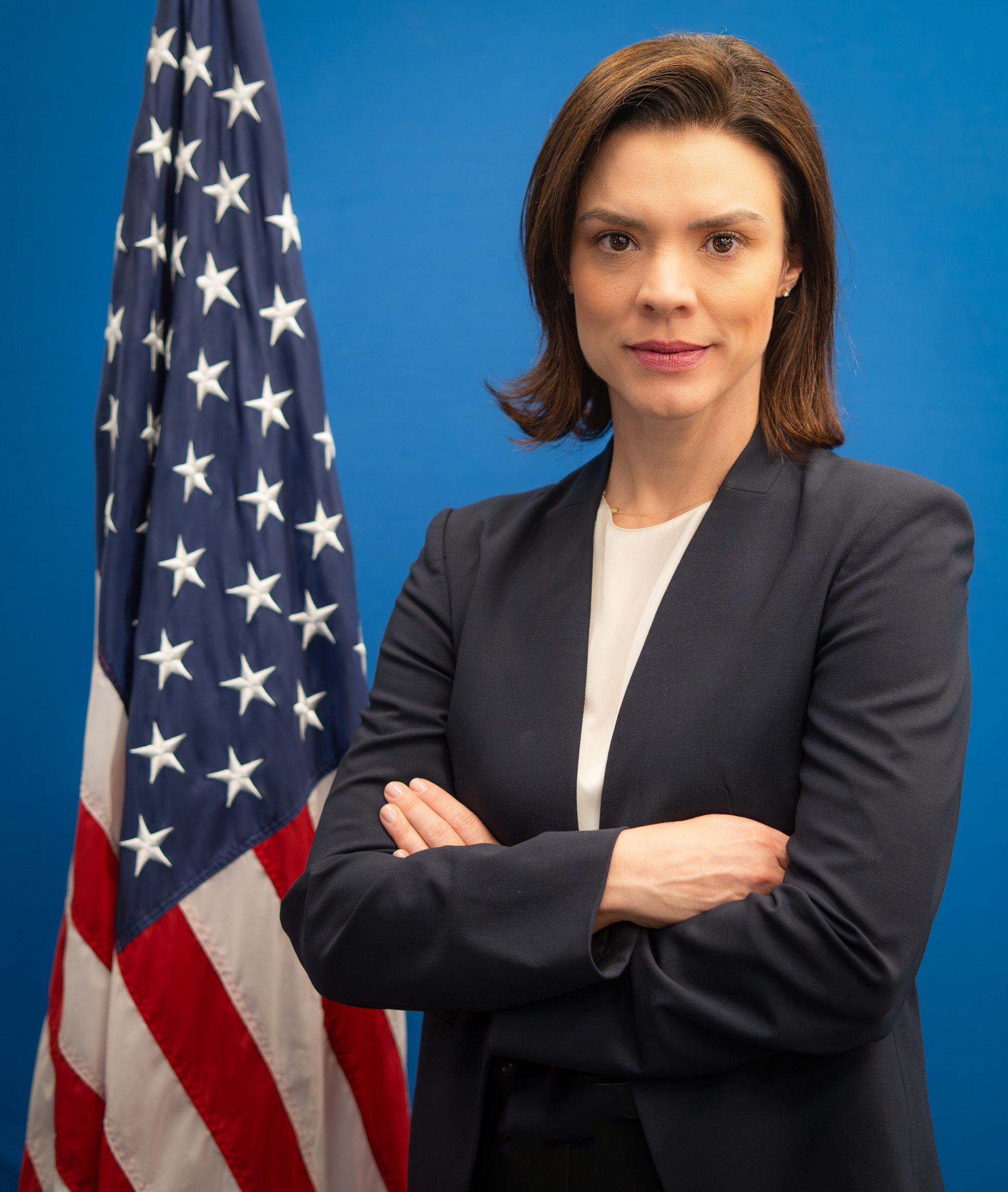
- Incumbent; Abigail L. Dressel; Chargé d'affaires since August 11, 2025
- Nominator: The president of the United States
- Appointer: The president with Senate advice and consent
- Inaugural holder: Willard Ames De Pree as Ambassador Extraordinary and Plenipotentiary
- Formation: February 4, 1976
- Website: Ambassador to Mozambique

Mozambique was an overseas possession of Portugal until 1975. On June 25, 1975, Portugal granted independence to Mozambique, much later than other European nations had freed their own African possessions.

The United States immediately recognized the new nation and moved to establish diplomatic relations. An embassy in the capital Maputo (then named Lourenço Marques) was opened November 8, 1975, with Johnnie Carson as chargé d’affaires ad interim. On February 4, 1976, Ambassador Willard Ames De Pree was appointed as the first Ambassador Extraordinary and Plenipotentiary to Mozambique.

== Ambassadors ==
Name	Title	Appointed	Presented credentials	Terminated mission	Notes
Willard Ames De Pree – Career FSO	Ambassador Extraordinary and Plenipotentiary	February 4, 1976	April 16, 1976	July 7, 1980	
William H. Twaddell	Chargé d’Affaires ad interim	July 7, 1980	-	September 23, 1983	
Peter Jon de Vos – Career FSO	Ambassador Extraordinary and Plenipotentiary	September 23, 1983	November 4, 1983	February 12, 1987	
Melissa Foelsch Wells – Career FSO	Ambassador Extraordinary and Plenipotentiary	September 11, 1987	September 26, 1987	October 12, 1990	
Townsend B. Friedman, Jr. – Career FSO	Ambassador Extraordinary and Plenipotentiary	August 6, 1990	November 10, 1990	September 15, 1993	
Dennis C. Jett – Career FSO	Ambassador Extraordinary and Plenipotentiary	July 16, 1993	November 17, 1993	July 20, 1996	
P. Michael McKinley	Chargé d’Affaires ad interim	July 20, 1996	-	December 3, 1997	
Brian D. Curran – Career FSO	Ambassador Extraordinary and Plenipotentiary	October 24, 1997	December 3, 1997	June 21, 2000	
Sharon P. Wilkinson – Career FSO	Ambassador Extraordinary and Plenipotentiary	September 15, 2000	October 25, 2000	July 21, 2003	
Helen R. Meagher La Lime – Career FSO	Ambassador Extraordinary and Plenipotentiary	April 16, 2003	September 3, 2003	June 21, 2006	
Todd C. Chapman	Chargé d'Affaires ad interim	July 2007	-	January 2010	
Leslie V. Rowe - Career FSO	Ambassador Extraordinary and Plenipotentiary	December 29, 2009	February 10, 2010	March 1, 2012	
Douglas M. Griffiths - Career FSO	Ambassador Extraordinary and Plenipotentiary	July 5, 2012	August 8, 2012	December 28, 2015	
H. Dean Pittman - Career FSO	Ambassador Extraordinary and Plenipotentiary	November 23, 2015	February 18, 2016	December 21, 2018	
Dennis Walter Hearne - Career FSO	Ambassador Extraordinary and Plenipotentiary	January 31, 2019	April 3, 2019	January 19, 2022	
Peter H. Vrooman - Career FSO	Ambassador Extraordinary and Plenipotentiary	December 18, 2021	March 3, 2022	May 29, 2025	
Jeremy Neitzke - Career FSO	Chargé d’Affaires ad interim	May 30, 2025		August 11, 2025	
Abigail L. Dressel - Career FSO	Chargé d’Affaires ad interim	August 11, 2025		Incumbent	

== See also ==
- Mozambique – United States relations
- Foreign relations of Mozambique
- Ambassadors of the United States

== Sources ==
- United States Department of State: Background notes on Mozambique
