= Richard Carlton Paschall III =

American diplomat

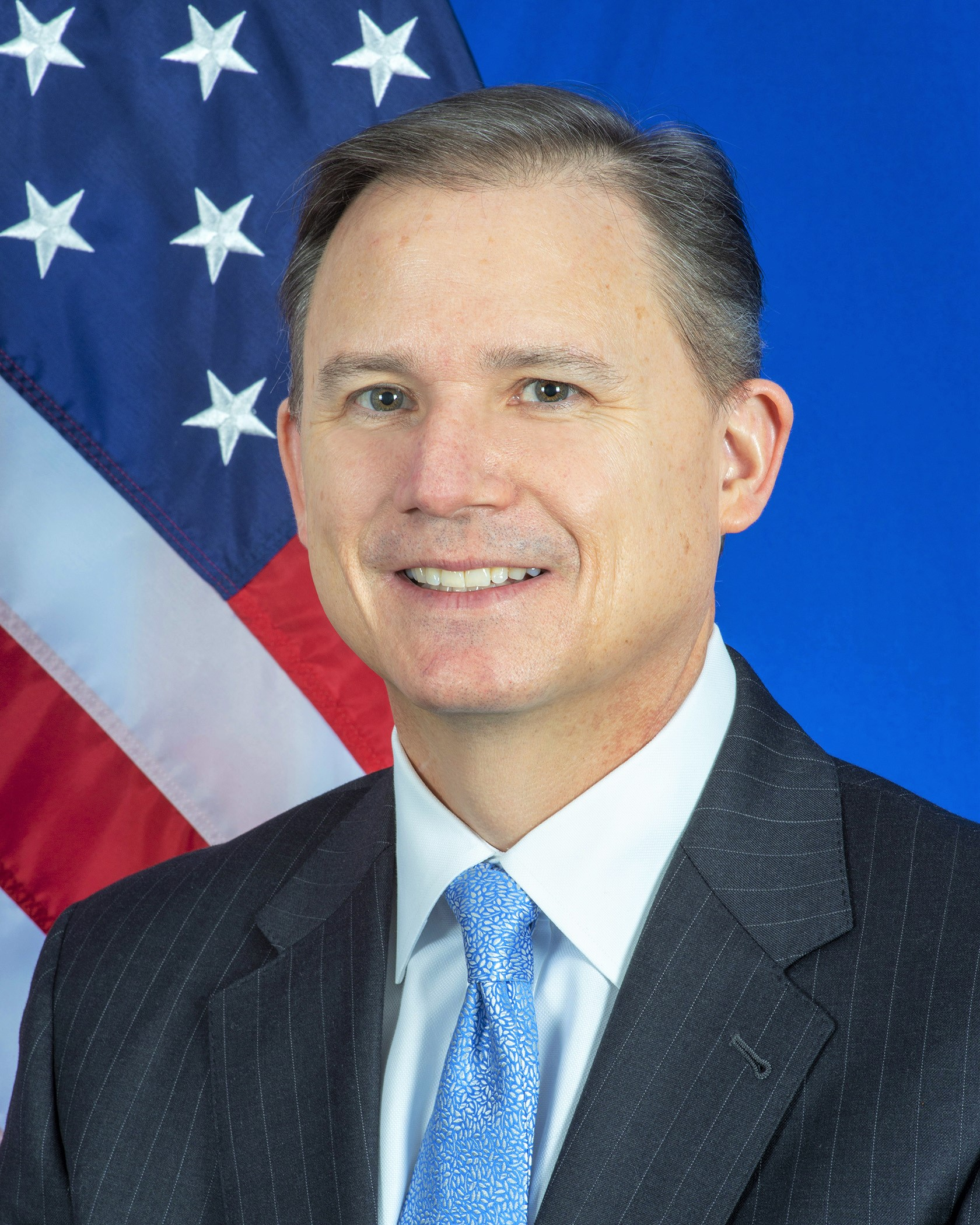

United States Ambassador to the Gambia
- In office April 9, 2019 – February 15, 2022
- President: Donald Trump; Joe Biden
- Preceded by: Patricia Alsup
- Succeeded by: Sharon L. Cromer

Personal details
- Spouse: Jane Ellen Miller Paschall
- Children: Richard Carlton Paschall IV; William Currie Paschall
- Education: University of North Carolina-Chapel Hill (B.A.); National Defense University (M.S.)

Richard Carlton Paschall III is an American diplomat who served as the United States ambassador to the Gambia from 2019 to 2022.

== Early life and education ==
Paschall earned a Bachelor of Arts from University of North Carolina-Chapel Hill and a Master of Science from the National Defense University.

== Career ==
Paschall is a career member of the Senior Foreign Service, class of Minister-Counselor. He has served with the Foreign Service since 1991. He served in leadership positions in the Bureau of African Affairs at the State Department, at the U.S. Embassies in Iraq and Chad, and as Foreign Policy Advisor to the Commander of the Special Operations Command-Africa. He was also the Deputy Coordinator for Military Coordination and Operations in the Bureau of Counterterrorism at the State Department.

On August 16, 2018, President Donald Trump announced his intent to nominate Paschall to be the next United States Ambassador to the Gambia. On January 2, 2019, his nomination was confirmed by voice vote in the United States Senate. He was sworn into office on January 15, 2019. Paschall arrived in The Gambia on March 14, 2019, and presented his credentials to President Adama Barrow on April 9, 2019. His mission ended on February 15, 2022.

== Awards ==
He is the recipient of numerous notable State Department awards as well as the Chairman of the Joint Chiefs of Staff Meritorious Civilian Service Award.

== Personal life ==
Paschall is married to Jane Ellen Miller Paschall, an attorney with expertise in international law, military justice, and rule of law capacity building, and father of two sons: His namesake, Richard Carlton Paschall IV, and William Currie Paschall.

Diplomatic posts
Preceded by Patricia Alsup	United States Ambassador to the Gambia; 2019–2022	Succeeded by Sharon L. Cromer
