= Eric W. Kneedler =

American diplomat

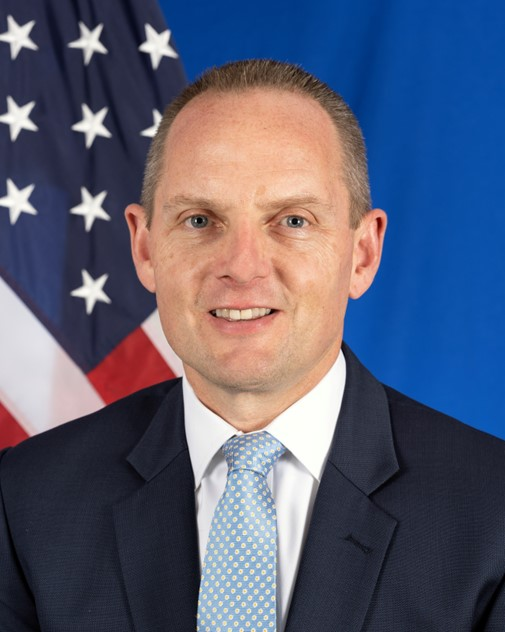

United States Ambassador to Rwanda
- In office October 18, 2023 – January 14, 2026
- President: Joe Biden; Donald Trump
- Preceded by: Peter H. Vrooman

Personal details
- Education: Pomona College (BA); Johns Hopkins University (MA)

Eric W. Kneedler is an American diplomat who served as the United States ambassador to Rwanda.

== Early life and education ==
Kneedler earned his Bachelor's degree from Pomona College, and his Master's degree from the Johns Hopkins School of Advanced International Studies.

== Career ==
Kneedler is a career member of the Senior Foreign Service with the rank of Minister-Counselor. He previously served as the Deputy Chief of Mission at the U.S. Embassy in Nairobi, Kenya, where he also served as Chargé d'Affaires, ad interim. Kneedler had also served as Counselor for Political Affairs at the Embassy in Nairobi, and held the same role at the U.S. Embassy in Manila, Philippines. Previously, Kneelder served as the Deputy Political Counselor at the U.S Embassy in Bangkok, Thailand, and as a Political Officer at the U.S. Embassy in Jakarta, Indonesia. Other assignments include Staff Assistant in the Bureau of European Affairs, a Senior Watch Officer in the State Department's Operations Center, and various positions at the U.S. Embassy in Port Louis, Mauritius, and at the U.S. Consulate in Hong Kong.

=== U.S ambassador to Rwanda ===
On August 3, 2022, President Joe Biden nominated Kneedler to be the ambassador to Rwanda. His nomination was not acted upon for the remainder of the year, and was returned to Biden on January 3, 2023.

President Biden renominated Kneedler the following day. Hearings on his nomination were held before the Senate Foreign Relations Committee on March 1, 2023. The committee favorably reported his nomination on April 27, 2023. His nomination was confirmed by the full United States Senate via voice vote on July 27, 2023. He presented his credentials to Rwandan President Paul Kagame on October 18, 2023.

== Personal life ==
His foreign languages include Thai, Indonesian, French, Cantonese, and Italian.
