= Harry R. Melone Jr. =

American diplomat

Harry Roberts Melone Jr. (June 30, 1928 - January 30, 2009) is a former US ambassador to Rwanda.

Melone was born in Auburn, New York. He completed his undergraduate education at Dartmouth College in 1950.

In 1951, he joined the United States Department of State and was posted to Tabriz, Tehran, Yaoundé and at the State Department. He served as Deputy Chief of Mission in Bangui (1961–63) and in Niamey (1963–64), and as international relations officer in the Bureau of African Affairs at the State Department. He served as advisor for African cultural affairs at the United States Mission to the United Nations (1966–68) and as counselor for political affairs in Conakry (1968–69). Melone attended the National War College in 1970–71, and was appointed Ambassador to the Republic of Rwanda by President Jimmy Carter on September 24, 1979.

== Sources ==
- http://www.presidency.ucsb.edu/ws/index.php?pid=31405

Diplomatic posts
Preceded by T. Frank Crigler	United States Ambassador to Rwanda; 1979–1982	Succeeded by John Blane
