= List of ambassadors of the United States to Rwanda =

Ambassador of the United States to Rwanda
- Seal of the United States Department of State

- Flag of a United States ambassador

- Incumbent; John Armiger; Chargé d'affaires since January 14, 2026
- Nominator: The president of the United States
- Inaugural holder: Charles D. Withers as Ambassador Extraordinary and Plenipotentiary
- Formation: March 9, 1963
- Website: U.S. Embassy – Kigali

The United States ambassador to Rwanda is the official representative of the president of the United States to the head of state of Rwanda.

Until 1962 Rwanda had been a part of the United Nations Trust Territory of Ruanda-Urundi under the trusteeship of Belgium. In June 1962 the UN General Assembly terminated the Belgian trusteeship and granted full independence to Rwanda and Burundi. The United States immediately recognized the Rwandan government on its independence day, July 1, 1962, and moved to establish diplomatic relations. The U.S. Embassy in the capital Kigali was established on July 1, 1962, with David J.S. Manbey as Chargé d'Affaires ad interim. Charles D. Withers was appointed as Ambassador Extraordinary and Plenipotentiary to Rwanda on March 9, 1963.

== Ambassadors and chiefs of mission ==
Name	Title	Appointed	Presented credentials	Terminated mission	Notes
Charles D. Withers – Career FSO	Ambassador Extraordinary and Plenipotentiary	March 9, 1963	April 19, 1963	September 15, 1966	
Leo G. Cyr – Career FSO	Ambassador Extraordinary and Plenipotentiary	September 19, 1966	November 4, 1966	September 29, 1971	
Robert Foster Corrigan – Career FSO	Ambassador Extraordinary and Plenipotentiary	December 9, 1971	March 24, 1972	August 3, 1973	
Robert E. Fritts – Career FSO	Ambassador Extraordinary and Plenipotentiary	February 28, 1974	April 18, 1974	June 18, 1976	
T. Frank Crigler – Career FSO	Ambassador Extraordinary and Plenipotentiary	September 16, 1976	October 29, 1976	May 12, 1979	
Harry R. Melone, Jr. – Career FSO	Ambassador Extraordinary and Plenipotentiary	November 6, 1979	December 28, 1979	August 17, 1982	
John Blane – Career FSO	Ambassador Extraordinary and Plenipotentiary	September 30, 1982	November 9, 1982	July 16, 1985	
John Edwin Upston – Political appointee	Ambassador Extraordinary and Plenipotentiary	December 17, 1985	February 13, 1986	July 14, 1987	
Leonard H. O. Spearman – Political appointee	Ambassador Extraordinary and Plenipotentiary	February 5, 1988	April 27, 1988	November 10, 1990	
Robert A. Flaten – Career FSO	Ambassador Extraordinary and Plenipotentiary	October 30, 1990	December 17, 1990	November 23, 1993	
David P. Rawson – Career FSO	Ambassador Extraordinary and Plenipotentiary	November 22, 1993	January 8, 1994	January 6, 1996	
Robert E. Gribbin III – Career FSO	Ambassador Extraordinary and Plenipotentiary	December 19, 1995	January 10, 1996	January 5, 1999	
George McDade Staples – Career FSO	Ambassador Extraordinary and Plenipotentiary	October 26, 1998	January 27, 1999	September 22, 2001	
Margaret K. McMillion – Career FSO	Ambassador Extraordinary and Plenipotentiary	November 5, 2001	December 13, 2001	July 10, 2004	
Michael R. Arietti – Career FSO	Ambassador Extraordinary and Plenipotentiary	November 2, 2005	December 5, 2005	November 2, 2008	
W. Stuart Symington – Career FSO	Ambassador Extraordinary and Plenipotentiary	August 4, 2008	November 3, 2008	July 5, 2011	
Donald W. Koran – Career FSO	Ambassador Extraordinary and Plenipotentiary	July 5, 2011	October 10, 2011	January 7, 2015	
Erica Barks-Ruggles – Career FSO	Ambassador Extraordinary and Plenipotentiary	December 15, 2014	January 26, 2015	March 15, 2018	
Peter H. Vrooman – Career FSO	Ambassador Extraordinary and Plenipotentiary	February 15, 2018	April 7, 2018	January 24, 2022	
Deb MacLean - Career FSO	Chargé d'Affairs ad interim	January 24, 2022		September 13, 2023	
Eric W. Kneedler - Career FSO	Ambassador Extraordinary and Plenipotentiary	July 27, 2023	October 18, 2023	January 14, 2026	
John Armiger - Career FSO	Chargé d'Affairs ad interim	January 14, 2026		Present	

== See also ==
- Rwanda – United States relations
- Foreign relations of Rwanda
- Ambassadors of the United States
