= Priscilla A. Clapp =

American diplomat (born 1941)

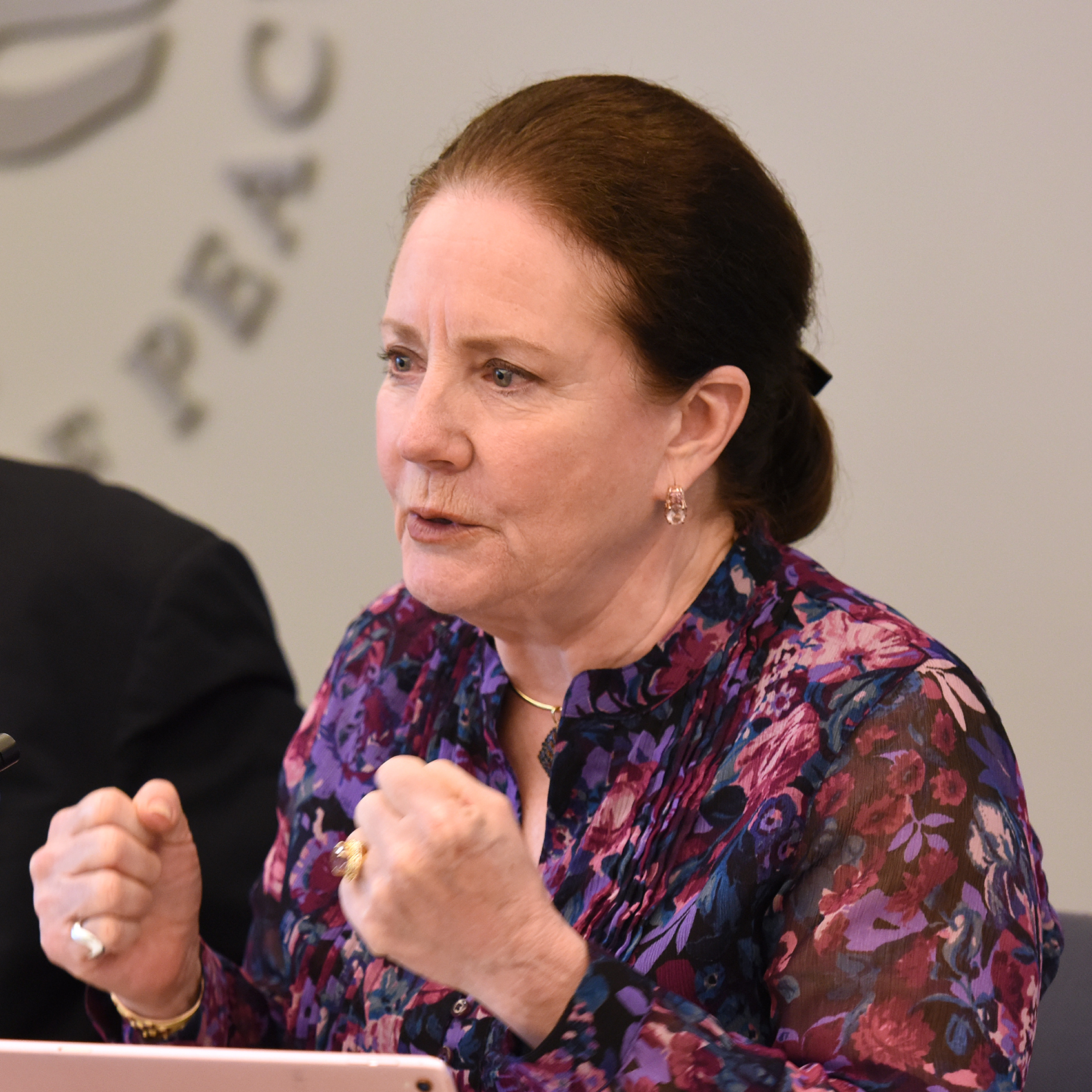
- in 2016 (U.S. Institute of Peace)
- Education: Middlebury College B.S. Russian Studies
- Title: Senior Advisor to United States Institute of Peace and Asia Society
- Children: 1
- Parent(s): Arthur W. Clapp, Anna L. Dorsey

Priscilla Ann Clapp (born 1941) is a United States diplomat who served as Chief of Mission in Burma from July 1999 to August 2002 and was then a senior advisor to the U.S. Institute of Peace and the Asia Society. She is a retired Minister-Counselor in the U.S. Foreign Service.

Diplomatic posts
Preceded by Kent M. Wiedemann	Chargé d'Affaires ad interim to Burma; 1996–1999	Succeeded by Carmen Maria Martinez
