= Erica Barks-Ruggles =

American diplomat (born 1967)

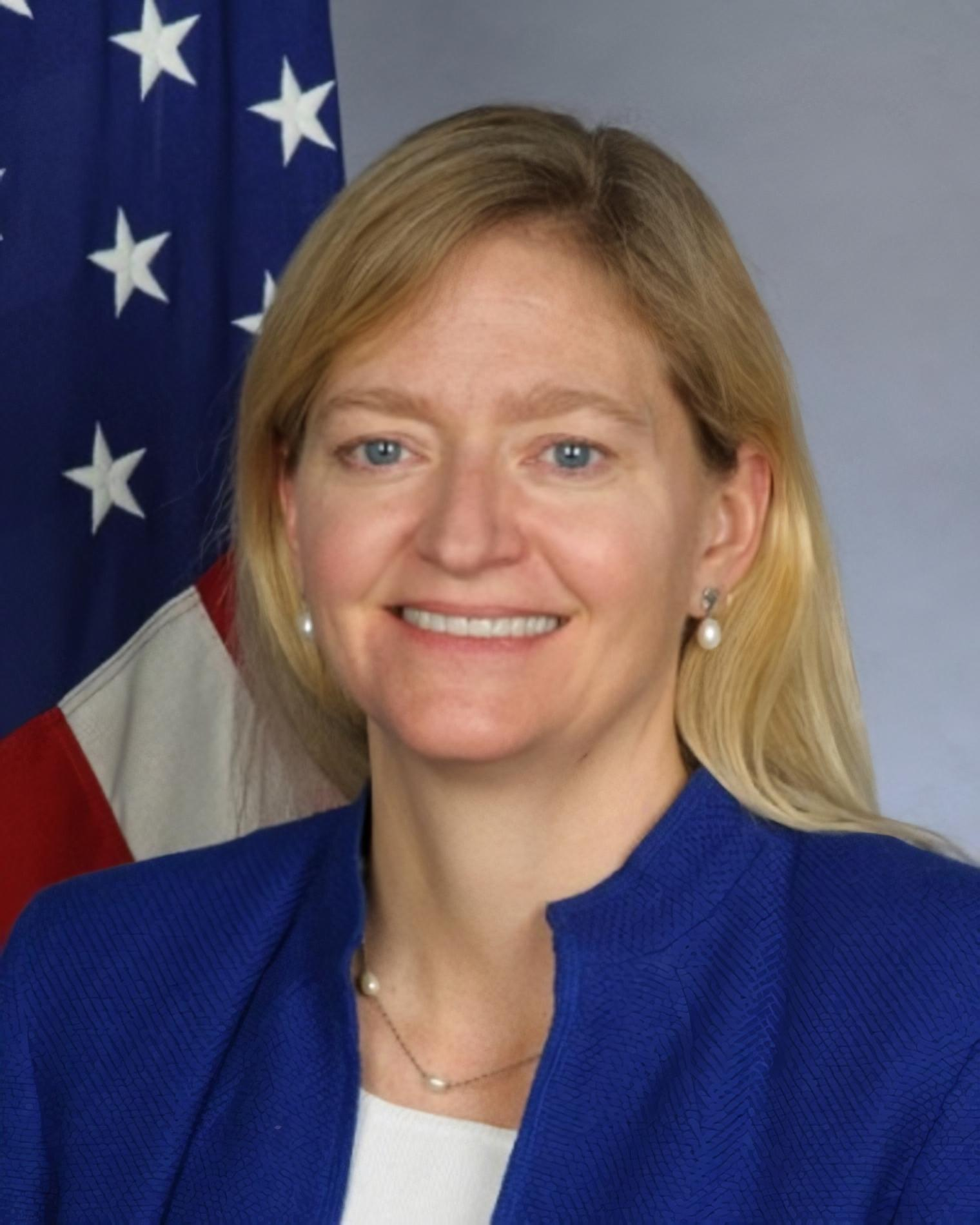
- Official portrait, 2017

Assistant Secretary of State for International Organization Affairs
- Senior Bureau Official
- In office January 20, 2021 – December 21, 2021
- President: Joe Biden
- Secretary: Antony Blinken
- Preceded by: Pamela D. Pryor
- Succeeded by: Michele J. Sison

United States Ambassador to Rwanda
- In office January 26, 2015 – March 15, 2018
- President: Barack Obama; Donald Trump
- Preceded by: Donald W. Koran
- Succeeded by: Peter H. Vrooman

Personal details
- Born: Erica Barks; 1967 (age 58–59)
- Party: Democratic
- Spouse: Taylor Ruggles
- Education: Anoka High School
- Alma mater: Swarthmore College

Erica Jean Barks-Ruggles (born 1967) is a diplomat and former United States Ambassador to Rwanda. She was nominated by President Barack Obama and confirmed by the Senate in November 2014. On July 14, 2023, she was appointed as the Head of the U.S. Mission to UNESCO.

== Early life and education ==
Barks-Ruggles grew up in the Midwestern United States. She graduated in 1985 from Anoka High School in Anoka, Minnesota. Her first time on a plane was when she flew to the east coast for college. At Swarthmore College she earned a bachelor's degree with honors in biology and English literature.

== Career ==
Barks-Ruggles studied for a year in France during college, and the experience convinced her to pursue a career in the U.S. Foreign Service. In her tours of duty she has lived in India, Norway and South Africa. Almost half of her career has been spent in and around Africa.

Barks-Ruggles served on Secretary of State Warren Christopher's travelling staff and as liaison with the bureaus responsible for the Newly Independent States, Political-Military Affairs, and Economic Affairs. From 1992 to 1994 she served in South India and she served as special assistant to the special envoy on Nigeria from 1994 to 1996

Following three years as director for African affairs at the National Security Council, she became an international affairs fellow with the Council on Foreign Relations, Barks-Ruggles was special assistant for Africa, South Asia, and human rights on the staff of Thomas R. Pickering, then under secretary of state for political affairs.

Barks-Ruggles joined The Brookings Institution in 2000 for a year, bringing her expertise on HIV/AIDS and its impact on African economies. Her assignment included studying how HIV/AIDS affects the economies of South Africa, Nigeria, and Uganda and assessing the national security implications of the disease. Following that assignment, Barks-Ruggles was the Deputy Head of the Political-Economic Section at the U.S. Embassy in Oslo, Norway from August 2001 to May 2004. From 2004 to 2005, Barks Ruggles was a Member of the Policy Planning Staff in the Office of the Secretary of State from 2004 to 2005, and for the following three years served as Deputy Assistant Secretary of the Bureau of Democracy, Human Rights, and Labor. While she was fulfilling that role, it became public that her manager had pressured her to soften a critical report she has written about human rights issues in North Korea.

From the beginning of 2009 until July 2011, Barks-Ruggles worked as the Deputy to the United States Permanent Representative to the United Nations. In that role, she provided leadership for Ambassador Susan Rice's Washington office. She also served on the Deputies Committee.

When nominated to become the U.S. Ambassador to Rwanda, Barks-Ruggles was serving as Consul General at the U.S. Consulate in Cape Town, South Africa. She served in the position from January 26, 2015, to March 15, 2018.

Barks-Ruggles served as the senior bureau official for the Bureau of International Organization Affairs, and acting assistant secretary of state for international organization affairs, from January 20 to December 21, 2021.

== Personal life ==
She is married to Taylor Ruggles. In addition to English, Barks-Ruggles speaks French and Norwegian.

== See also ==
- List of ambassadors of the United States

Diplomatic posts
Preceded by Pamela D. Pryor	United States Ambassador to Rwanda; 2015–2018	Succeeded by Peter Vrooman
Political offices
Preceded by Donald W. Koran	Assistant Secretary of State for International Organization Affairs; Senior Bureau Official; 2021	Succeeded by Michele J. Sison
