= List of ambassadors of the United States to Zambia =

Ambassador of the United States to Zambia
- Seal of the United States Department of State

- Flag of a United States ambassador

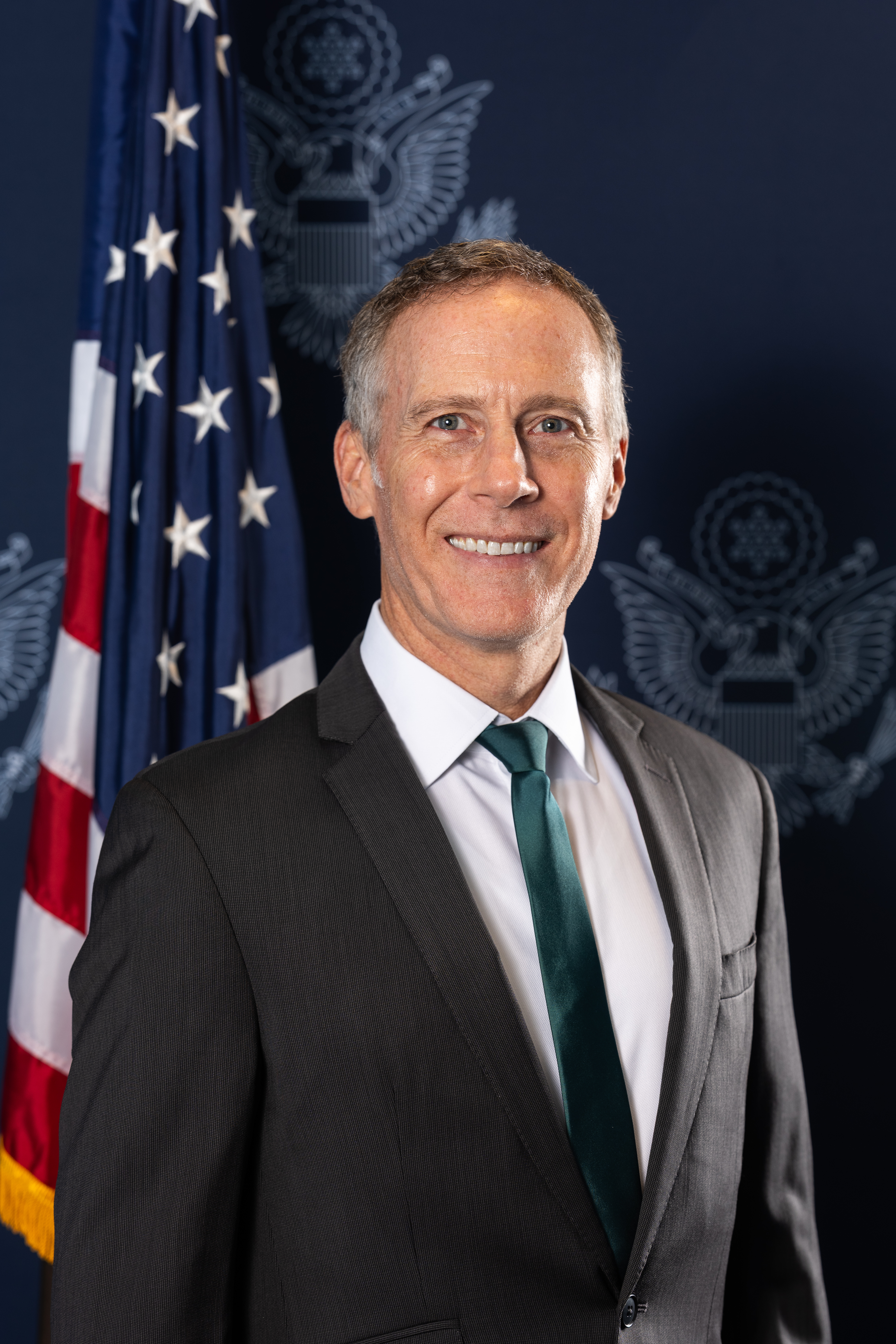
- Incumbent; Mich Coker; Chargé d'affaires since May 1, 2026
- Nominator: The president of the United States
- Inaugural holder: Robert C. Good as Ambassador Extraordinary and Plenipotentiary
- Formation: March 11, 1965
- Website: U.S. Embassy - Lusaka

The history of ambassadors of the United States to Zambia began in 1964.

Until 1964 Zambia had been a colony of the British Empire, first as Northern Rhodesia and then as a part of the Federation of Rhodesia and Nyasaland. On December 31, 1963, the federation was dissolved into Rhodesia and Northern Rhodesia. On October 24, 1964, Northern Rhodesia gained full independence as the Republic of Zambia.

The United States immediately recognized the new nation and moved to establish diplomatic relations. An embassy in Lusaka was established on October 24, 1964—independence day for Zambia. Robert C. Foulon was appointed as Chargé d’Affaires ad interim pending the appointment of an ambassador. The first ambassador, Robert C. Good was appointed on March 11, 1965. All U.S. Ambassadors to Zambia have held the official title Ambassador Extraordinary and Plenipotentiary.

The United States embassy in Zambia is located in Lusaka.

The U.S. ambassador to Zambia serves concurrently as the U.S. representative to the Common Market for Eastern and Southern Africa (COMESA).

== Ambassadors ==
Image	Name	Appointed	Presented credentials	Terminated mission
	Robert C. Good – Political appointee	March 11, 1965	March 24, 1965	December 14, 1968
	Oliver L. Troxel, Jr. – Career FSO	May 27, 1969	July 17, 1969	May 12, 1972
	Jean M. Wilkowski – Career FSO	June 27, 1972	September 26, 1972	July 24, 1976
	Stephen Low – Career FSO	August 5, 1976	August 31, 1976	July 5, 1979
	Frank George Wisner II – Career FSO	August 2, 1979	August 28, 1979	April 19, 1982
	Nicholas Platt – Career FSO	July 22, 1982	August 31, 1982	December 17, 1984
	Paul Julian Hare – Career FSO	July 12, 1985	July 31, 1985	August 8, 1988
	Jeffrey Davidow – Career FSO	July 11, 1988	September 1, 1988	March 31, 1990
	Gordon L. Streeb – Career FSO	October 22, 1990	November 21, 1990	December 27, 1993
	Roland Karl Kuchel – Career FSO	August 9, 1993	January 14, 1994	November 10, 1996
	Arlene Render – Career FSO	July 2, 1996	December 20, 1996	June 30, 1999
	David B. Dunn – Career FSO	July 7, 1999	September 2, 1999	July 1, 2002
	Martin George Brennan – Career FSO	October 3, 2002	December 5, 2002	July 15, 2005
	Carmen M. Martinez – Career FSO	November 2, 2005	December 12, 2005	July 29, 2008
	Donald E. Booth – Career FSO	June 4, 2008	September 19, 2008	March 17, 2010
	Mark C. Storella – Career FSO	August 20, 2010	September 21, 2010	August 8, 2013
	Eric T. Schultz – Career FSO	September 18, 2014	December 12, 2014	November 20, 2017
	Daniel Lewis Foote – Career FSO	November 20, 2017	December 14, 2017	January 2, 2020
	Michael C. Gonzales - Career FSO	August 4, 2022	September 16, 2022	April 30, 2026

== See also ==
- United States - Zambia relations
- Foreign relations of Zambia
- Ambassadors of the United States
