= T. Frank Crigler =

American diplomat

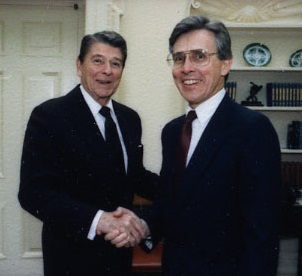
T. Frank Crigler And Ronald Reagan

Trusten Frank Crigler (October 17, 1935 in Phoenix, Arizona - May 16, 2021) was a career foreign service officer who became the US Ambassador to Rwanda from October 29, 1976 until May 12, 1979 and Ambassador to Somalia from June 3, 1987 until April 1, 1990.

Crigler taught International Affairs at Simmons College once he retired from the State Department. He and his wife (Bettie Ann née Morris) moved to Durham, North Carolina in 1996. He co-founded American Diplomacy, an online quarterly, the same year. Crigler was a fellow with Duke University’s Center for International Development and Research and was a member of the Planning Committee for Carolina Friends of the Foreign Service.

== Education ==
Crigler graduated magna cum laude from Harvard College (B.A., 1957) and spoke Spanish and French.

== Career ==
Cigler's first position when he joined the Foreign Service in 1961 was as an intelligence analyst in the Bureau of Intelligence and Research. In 1963, he became political officer at the American consulate general in Guadalajara, Mexico. Future positions included consular officer at the U.S. Embassy in Mexico, 1964 - 1966; political officer at the U.S. Embassy in Kinshasa, Zaire, 1966 - 1967; American consul (resident) in Bukavu, Zaire, April to July 1967; American consul (nonresident) in Kisangani, Zaire, 1967 - 1969; political-economic officer at the U.S. Embassy in Libreville, Gabon, 1969 - 1970; and political adviser at the U.S. Mission to the Organization of American States in Washington, DC, 1970.

As a result of a congressional fellowship, he served on the staff of Representative Frank Thompson (NJ) and then with Senator Lloyd Bentsen (TX). He returned to Mexico in August 1974 as political officer at the Embassy, serving until he was appointed Ambassador to Kigali, Rwanda, in September 1976. He became deputy chief of mission at the U.S. Embassy in Bogota, Colombia, 1979, and Chargé d'Affaires, 1979 - 1981; Director of the Office of Mexican Affairs, 1981 - 1983; and Senior Inspector, Office of the Inspector General at the Department of State, 1983.

From 1993 to 1995, Crigler taught at Simmons College as the Warburg Chair in International Relations.

== Personal life ==
He and his wife had three children.

Diplomatic posts
Preceded by Peter Bridges	United States Ambassador to Somalia; 1987-1990	Succeeded by James Bishop

Diplomatic posts
Preceded by Robert E. Fritts	United States Ambassador to Rwanda; 1976-1979	Succeeded by Harry R. Melone Jr.
