= Dennis Walter Hearne =

American diplomat

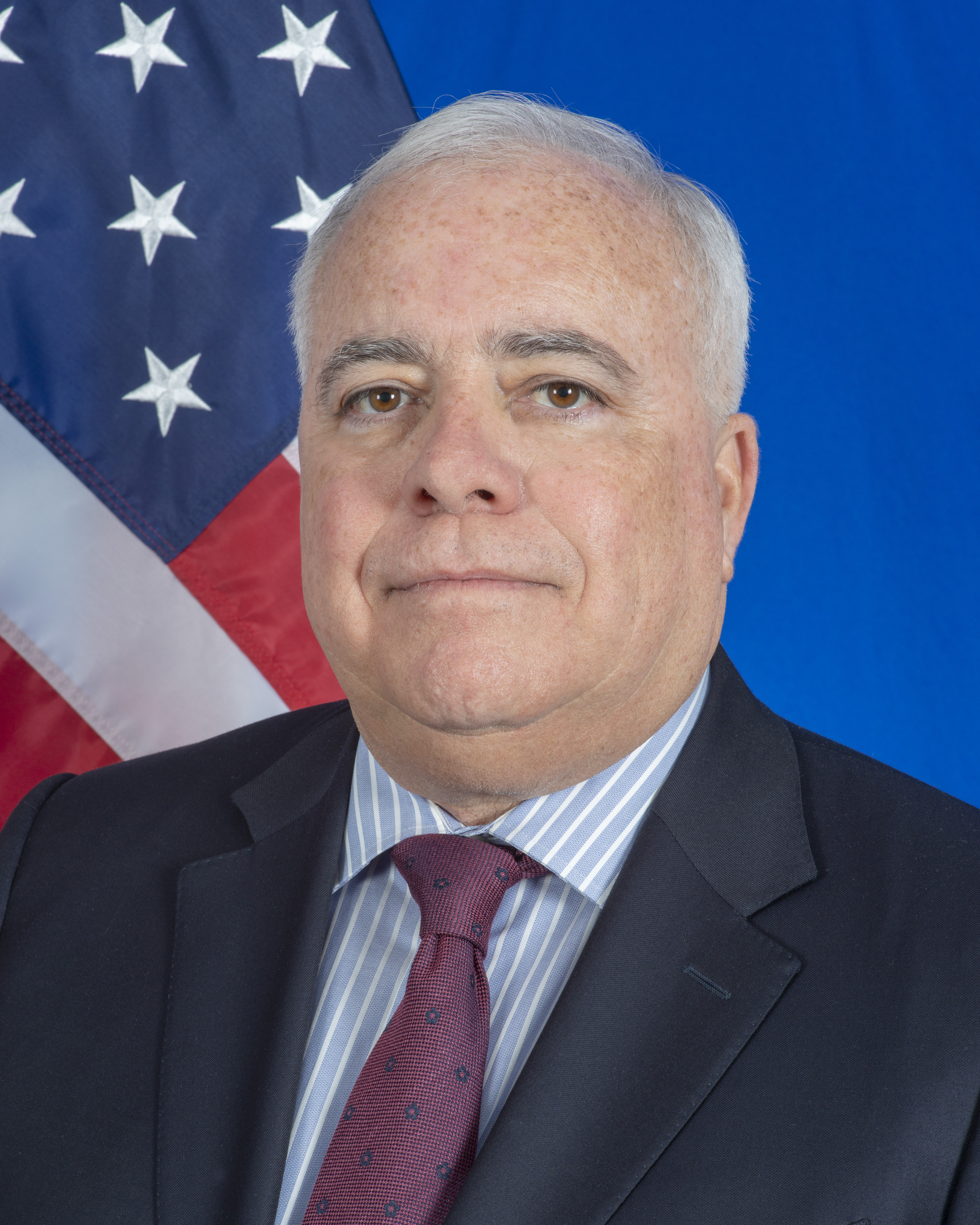

United States Ambassador to Mozambique
- In office April 3, 2019 – January 19, 2022
- President: Donald Trump; Joe Biden
- Preceded by: H. Dean Pittman
- Succeeded by: Peter H. Vrooman

Personal details
- Education: Wake Forest University (BA); National War College (MS)

Dennis Walter Hearne is an American diplomat who served as the United States ambassador to Mozambique from 2019 to 2022.

== Education ==
Hearne earned a Bachelor of Arts from Wake Forest University and a Master of Science from the National War College.

== Career ==
Hearne is a career member of the Senior Foreign Service, class of Counselor. He has served as an American diplomat since 1985. His previous positions include serving as Deputy Chief of Mission at the United States Embassy in Kabul, Afghanistan, from 2016 to 2017; Senior Advisor to the Under Secretary for Political Affairs from 2015 to 2016; United States Consul General in Rio de Janeiro, Brazil, from 2009 to 2012; and as foreign policy advisor to United States military commanders, including two years of service in combat operations in Afghanistan. Prior to being appointed an Ambassador he was the Principal Deputy High Representative, Office of the High Representative, in Sarajevo, Bosnia.

== Ambassador to Mozambique ==
On August 31, 2018, President Donald Trump nominated Hearne to serve as the United States Ambassador to Mozambique. His nomination was confirmed by the United States Senate by voice vote on January 2, 2019. On April 3, 2019, he presented his credentials to President Filipe Nyusi. He left his post in January 2022.

== Awards ==
He is the recipient of the United States Army Outstanding Civilian Service Medal.

== Personal life ==
Hearne speaks Croatian and Portuguese.

Diplomatic posts
Preceded by H. Dean Pittman	United States Ambassador to Mozambique; 2019–2022	Succeeded by Peter H. Vrooman
