= Michael C. Gonzales =

American diplomat

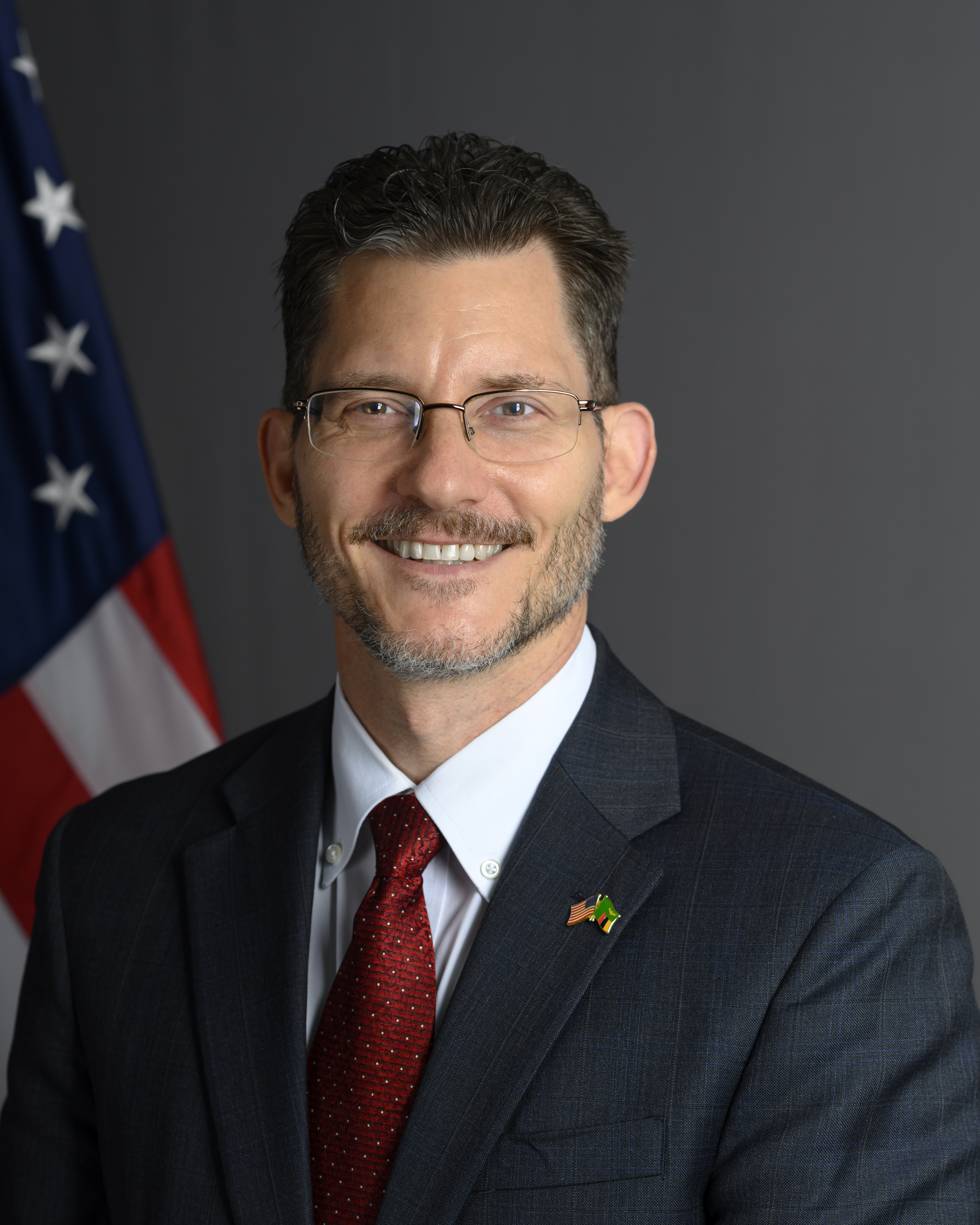

United States Ambassador to Zambia
- In office September 16, 2022 – April 30, 2026
- President: Joe Biden; Donald Trump
- Preceded by: Daniel Lewis Foote

Personal details
- Education: Occidental College (BA); American University School of International Service (MA)

Michael C. Gonzales is an American diplomat who had served as the United States ambassador to Zambia. He previously served as the deputy assistant secretary of state in the Bureau of African Affairs.

== Early life and education ==
Gonzales earned a Bachelor of Arts from Occidental College in Los Angeles and a Master of Arts from the American University School of International Service in Washington, D.C.

== Career ==
Gonzales is a career member of the Senior Foreign Service, class of Minister-Counselor. He has held many positions throughout his career; he was the director of analysis of Africa in the State Department's Bureau of Intelligence and Research. Overseas, he held leadership positions as the deputy chief of mission of the U.S. embassy in Kathmandu, Nepal and of the U.S. embassy in Lilongwe, Malawi; and as the political and economic counselor of the U.S. embassies in Harare, Zimbabwe and Addis Ababa, Ethiopia. In addition, Gonzales served as spokesperson and Information Officer at the U.S Embassy in Addis Ababa; Ethiopia desk officer in the State Department; and deputy public affairs officer of the U.S. embassy in Kampala, Uganda. Since October 1, 2020, he has served as the deputy assistant secretary of state in the Bureau of African Affairs.

=== United States ambassador to Zambia ===
On April 22, 2022, President Joe Biden announced his intent to nominate Gonzales to be the next United States ambassador to Zambia. On April 25, 2022, his nomination was sent to the Senate. Hearings on his nomination were held before the Senate Foreign Relations Committee on May 24, 2022. The nomination was favorably reported to the Senate floor on June 9, 2022. Gonzales was confirmed by the full Senate on August 4, 2022 by voice vote. He was sworn in in August 2022, and presented his credentials to President Hakainde Hichilema on September 16, 2022.

In May 2025 Gonzales announced a $50 million cut to medical aid for Zambia. He cited large-scale theft and fraud relating to the program, and inaction from the Zambian government regarding said theft and fraud. He cried at the press conference, stating that while senior officials would likely not be affected by the cuts, poor Zambians were.

In January 2026, Gonzales published a State Department essay arguing that U.S. foreign assistance too often enabled corruption and should be restructured around mutual accountability and performance-based outcomes. In it he wrote, “Under President Trump and Secretary Rubio’s leadership, we have the opportunity and courage to acknowledge our mistakes, to embrace candid lessons learned, and to do better.”

== Personal life ==
Gonzales speaks Spanish and French.

== See also ==
- Ambassadors of the United States

Diplomatic posts
Preceded by Daniel Lewis Foote; David J. Young; Chargé d'Affaires	United States Ambassador to Zambia; 2022–present	Incumbent
