= Patricia Alsup =

American diplomat (born 1950)

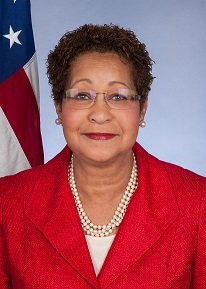

United States Ambassador to The Gambia
- In office January 13, 2016 – September 22, 2018
- President: Barack Obama; Donald Trump
- Preceded by: Edward M. Alford
- Succeeded by: Richard Carlton Paschall III

Personal details
- Born: September 24, 1950 (age 75)
- Education: Wellesley College; Harvard Business School

Carolyn Patricia "Pat" Alsup (born September 24, 1950) is a diplomat and former United States Ambassador to the Gambia. She was nominated by President Barack Obama on June 8, 2015, and confirmed by the Senate on October 8, 2015.

== Early life and education ==
Alsup is from St. Petersburg, Florida. She is the daughter of Nora Reed Alsup and Frederick "Fred" W. Alsup. Her father was a physician and civil rights activist. When she was twelve, Alsup spent a summer in Germany, an experience that sparked an early interest in the languages and culture of other countries. She attended Westtown School, a Quaker high school near Philadelphia, and graduated in 1968.

Alsup then attended Wellesley College as an undergraduate and received her B.A. degree in economics in 1972. She earned an M.B.A. at the Harvard Business School with an emphasis in marketing. Later, she attended the Dwight D. Eisenhower School for National Security and Resource Strategy, formerly known as the Industrial College of the Armed Forces, National Defense University, where she received an M.A. in 2008.

== Career ==
Alsup's career began in the private sector, where she worked for Seaway Hotels Corporation, the City of Saint Petersburg, the aerospace division of Ling-Temco-Vought Aerospace, and S. C. Johnson & Son. She was a consultant and art gallery owner in Saint Petersburg, Florida. Alsup also worked for the Washington, D.C., Development Corporation and served as a commissioner for the St. Petersburg Housing Authority.

In 1992 Alsop joined the U.S. Foreign Service and by 2000, had served in Washington, D.C, the U.S. Embassy in Mexico City, and the Consular Officer at the U.S. Embassy Santo Domingo in the Dominican Republic.

From 2001 to 2003, Alsup served as a special assistant in the Office of Undersecretary for Economics, Business & Agriculture. She was then an examiner on the department's Board of Examiners and executive assistant with the Economic Bureau.

Much of the second half of her career with the Foreign Service was spent in Africa, or on assignments related to Africa. She became deputy chief of mission at the U.S. Embassy in Banjul, The Gambia, a role she held from 2005 to 2007.

She then served as a career development officer and then accepted assignments in the Office of Central African Affairs from 2010 to 2012. She then became deputy chief of mission at the U.S. Embassy in Accra, Ghana, a role she left after three years.

In November 2015, Alsup arrived in The Gambia as ambassador-designate.

On December 14, 2015, Alsup held a swearing-in ceremony for more than thirty new Peace Corps volunteers at her residence in Gambia. Half were assigned to work on community-based health projects, while the other half were scheduled to work with farmers to improve local agricultural practices and promote sustainability. Peace Corps volunteers have served in Gambia since the program was first opened in 1967, and over 1,745 Peace Corps workers in Gambia since that time.

Alsup presented her credentials to The Gambia's vice president, Dr. Isatou Njie-Saidy at the State House in Banjul on January 13, 2016. When she met with Njie-Saidy, Alsup said, "It is my sincere hope that we will share information freely, collaborate openly, and work together tirelessly to improve relations between our two great nations, and further better the lives of the warm, welcoming people of The Gambia." She ended her tour and term as ambassador on September 22, 2018.
