= Robert C. Good =

American diplomat

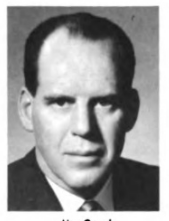

16th President of Denison University
- In office 1976–1984
- Preceded by: Joel P. Smith
- Succeeded by: Andrew G. De Rocco

1st U.S. Ambassador to Zambia
- In office March 11, 1965 – December 14, 1968
- Succeeded by: Oliver L. Troxel, Jr.

Personal details
- Born: 1924
- Died: September 16, 1984 (aged 60) Aurora, Colorado
- Occupation: University president, ambassador

Robert C. Good (1924 - September 16, 1984) was president of Denison University and the first US Ambassador to Zambia (March 1965 – January 1969).

Good graduated from Yale with a PhD and was the Administrator of International Student Seminars in Philadelphia in 1948. After his graduation from Yale, he taught international relations at the University of Denver from 1958 to 1961. He was also a Research Associate with the Washington Center of Foreign Policy Research at Johns Hopkins during this period. In September 1961, Good joined the Foreign Service and worked as the Director of the Office of Research and Analysis for Africa in the until his appointment as ambassador to Zambia in 1965.

== Death ==
Good served as president of Denison until he was diagnosed with a brain tumor in October 1983. He died at the University of Colorado Medical Center on September 16, 1984.
