= Ruth V. Washington =

American magistrate

Ruth V. Washington (1921, Buffalo, New York – January 20, 1990 Hartsdale, New York) was a US Magistrate.

Washington died in a car accident near her home in Hartsdale, New York on January 20, 1990. The other driver had been charged with driving while intoxicated. She was due to leave that week to succeed Herbert E. Horowitz as Ambassador of the United States to the Gambia. She was recommended to be an Ambassador by Jonathan Bush.

== Education ==
Washington graduated from Hunter College (B.A., 1944) and the New York University Law School (LL.B, 1947; J.D., 1968) where she was one of two women in the school. She also attended the New York University School of Business Administration.

== Career ==
Washington worked as a probation officer for the City of New York after law school. She ran for the New York City Council as a Republican in the 1950s and lost. It was her only candidacy for elected office. She was a litigation attorney for the U.S. Dept. of Labor Solicitor Office and Associate Counsel for the State Division of Human Rights (1961–1963), Commissioner of the New York State Workers’ Compensation Board (1968–1974), chairwoman of the Benefits Review Board of the U.S. Department of Labor (1974–1977) and Magistrate for the Southern District of New York (1979–1987).
