= Robert A. Flaten =

American diplomat (1934–2025)

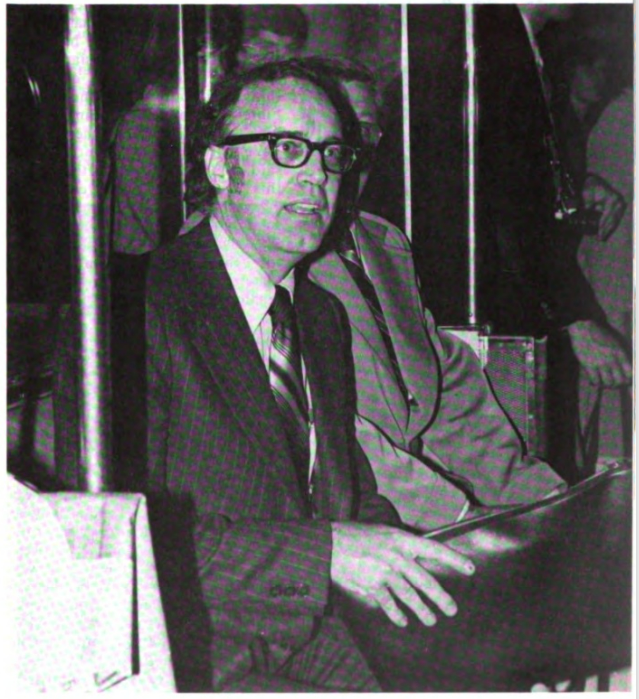
Flaten in 1978

Robert Arnold Flaten (May 21, 1934 – December 21, 2025) was an American diplomat who served as the United States ambassador to Rwanda from 1990 to 1993. He retired in May 1994 and became chair of the Executive Committee of the Nobel Peace Prize Forum.

== Early life and career ==
Robert Arnold Flaten was born in Northfield, Minnesota, on May 21, 1934. He graduated from Northfield High School and earned a Bachelor of Arts degree from St. Olaf College, a Master of Arts in International Relations from the George Washington University, and a Doctor of Philosophy in South Asian Area Studies from the University of Pennsylvania. After graduating, Flaten worked in the United States Air Force from 1956 to 1959 as an aircraft pilot and radar controller.

== Diplomatic career ==
Flaten joined the United States Foreign Service in 1961. He was Director of the State Department Office of India, Nepal and Sri Lanka and Director of the Office of Pakistan, Afghanistan and Bangladesh Affairs in Washington, D.C. Flaten also served as Deputy Chief of Mission at the American Embassy in Tel Aviv from 1982 to 1986, Director of the Office of North African Affairs for one year, Deputy Assistant Secretary of the State Department Office of Congressional Relations from 1979 to 1981, Vice Consul in Peshawar, Pakistan, and Vice Consul in Strasbourg, France.

He was appointed the United States ambassador to Rwanda by President George H. W. Bush on October 30, 1990, succeeding Leonard H. O. Spearman. He presented his credentials on December 17, 1990, and served until November 23, 1993. During his tenure, he was actively involved in addressing the political climate in Rwanda, particularly concerning the tensions between Hutu and Tutsi groups. In 1993, he expressed concerns regarding the influx of Hutus from Burundi into Rwanda, indicating his awareness of the escalating ethnic tensions that would later culminate in the Rwandan genocide in 1994.

Flaten retired from the Foreign Service in May 1994, shortly after the genocide began, which significantly impacted Rwanda–United States relations and international diplomatic efforts in the region.

== Post-diplomatic career ==
After retiring from diplomatic service, Flaten became involved with various organizations focused on peace and human rights. Notably, he served as the chair of the Executive Committee of the Nobel Peace Prize Forum, where he contributed to discussions and initiatives aimed at promoting peace globally. Flaten also lectured at St. Olaf College.

== Personal life and death ==
Flaten was married and had four children, having moved to Arlington County, Virginia. He died in Stillwater, Minnesota, on December 21, 2025 at the age of 91.
