= The Gambia–United States relations =

- Gambia: United States

The Gambia–United States relations are bilateral relations between the Republic of The Gambia and the United States of America.

== History ==
En route to Casablanca for a conference and then to Liberia, Franklin D. Roosevelt stopped in Banjul in 1943.

U.S. policy seeks to build improved relations with The Gambia on the basis of historical ties, mutual respect, democratic rule, human rights, and adherence to UN resolutions on counter-terrorism, conflict diamonds, and other forms of trafficking. Following The Gambia's successful presidential and legislative elections in October 2001 and January 2002, respectively, the U.S. Government determined that a democratically elected government had assumed office and thus lifted the sanctions it had imposed against The Gambia in accordance with Section 508 of the Foreign Assistance Act as a result of the 1994 coup. U.S. assistance supports democracy, human rights, girls' education, and the fight against HIV/AIDS. In addition, the Peace Corps maintains a large program with about 100 volunteers engaged in the environment, public health, and education sectors, mainly at the village level.

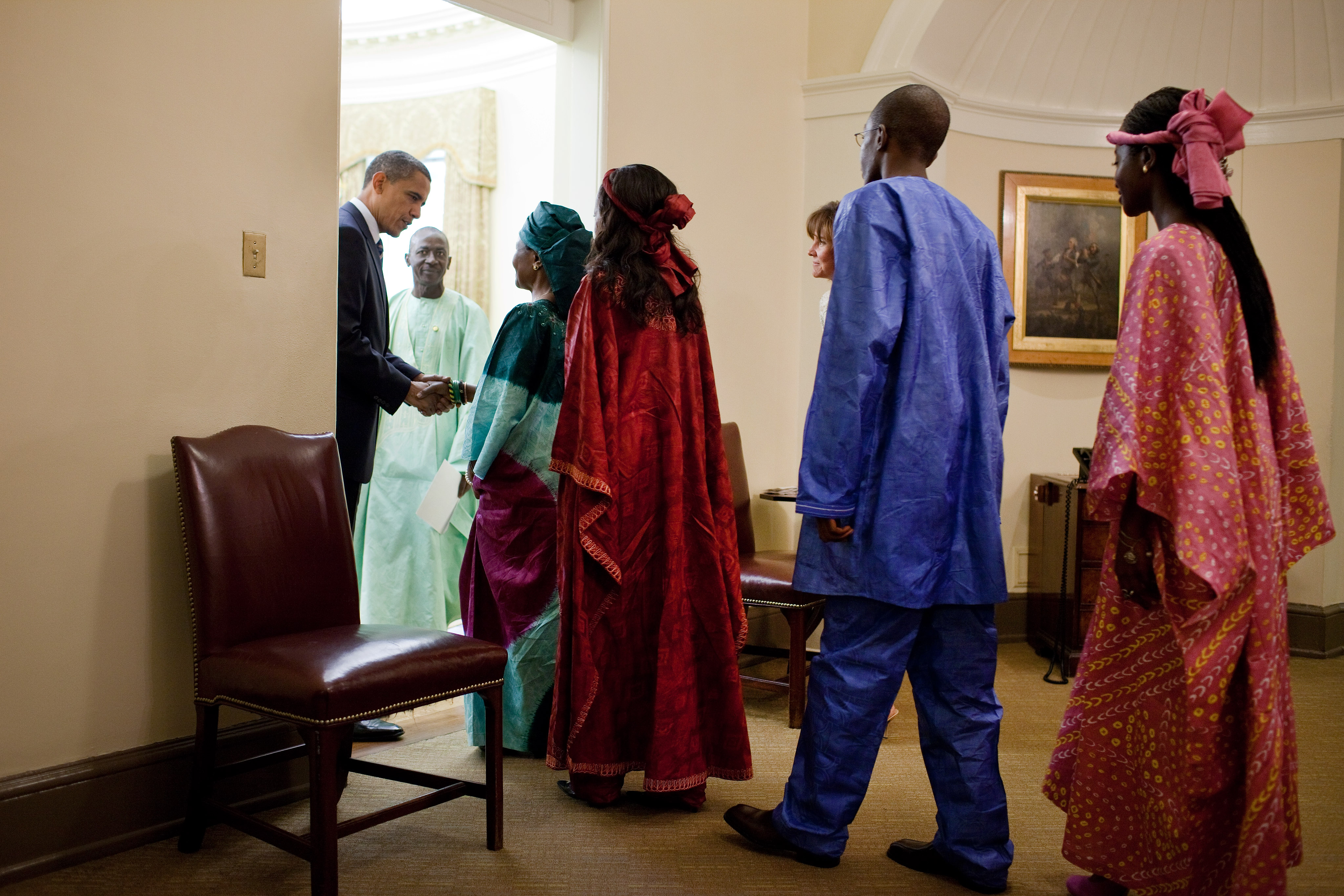
Incoming Gambian Ambassador Alieu Momodou Ngum and his family meet President Barack Obama at the White House.

Relations with the U.S. have not been improved significantly due to the human rights and freedom of press shortcomings, which resulted in the suspension of The Gambia's compact with the Millennium Challenge Corporation (MCC) in June 2006. The Gambia became eligible for preferential trade benefits under the African Growth and Opportunity Act (AGOA) on January 1, 2003.

Principal U.S. officials include Ambassador Sharon L. Cromer.

The U.S. Embassy in The Gambia is located in Fajara (13°27′43.1″N 16°41′12.1″W). The Peace Corps office is near the embassy.

Yundum Airport was an emergency landing site for NASA Space Shuttles.

== See also ==
- Foreign relations of the United States
- Foreign relations of the Gambia
