= Sharon L. Cromer =

American diplomat

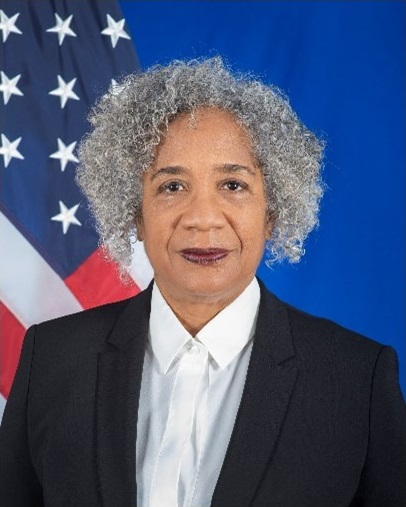

United States Ambassador to the Gambia
- In office March 18, 2022 – August 21, 2025
- President: Joe Biden; Donald Trump
- Preceded by: Richard Carlton Paschall III
- Succeeded by: Laurence Socha

Personal details
- Born: Sharon Lee Cromer Washington, D.C., U.S.
- Education: Barnard College (BA); Georgetown University (JD)

Sharon L. Cromer is an American diplomat who had served as the United States ambassador to the Gambia.

== Early life and education ==
Cromer was born in Washington, D.C. She earned a Bachelor of Arts from Barnard College and a Juris Doctor from the Georgetown University Law Center.

== Career ==
Cromer is a career member of the Senior Foreign Service, with the rank of career minister. She served as the U.S. Agency for International Development (USAID) mission director at the U.S. Embassy in Accra, Ghana; she has had multiple positions here. Previously she was the USAID mission director at the U.S. Embassy in Dar es Salaam, Tanzania and she has also been the USAID mission director at the U.S. Embassy in Abuja, Nigeria. Cromer served as senior deputy assistant administrator and acting assistant administrator in the Africa Bureau of USAID, and also as the deputy assistant administrator of the USAID Management Bureau. In Jakarta, Indonesia, Cromer was a supervisory contracting officer, and then the USAID deputy mission director, at the U.S. Embassy. Cromer has also served as a contracting officer in Senegal, Ivory Coast, and Pakistan.

Cromer has also held several positions in Africa.

=== United States ambassador to the Gambia ===
On June 15, 2021, President Joe Biden nominated Cromer to be the next United States Ambassador to The Gambia. On September 29, 2021, a hearing on her nomination was held before the Senate Foreign Relations Committee. On October 19, 2021, her nomination was reported favorably out of committee. On December 18, 2021, the United States Senate confirmed her nomination by voice vote.

Cromer was sworn into office on January 22, 2022, and she presented her credentials to the President Adama Barrow on March 18, 2022.

Starting in February 2025, Cromer reportedly pressured the Gambian government to issue a license for Elon Musk’s internet company Starlink, as part of broader diplomatic efforts to ease his business while he held a role in the U.S. government.

Diplomatic posts
Preceded by Richard Carlton Paschall III	United States Ambassador to the Gambia; 2022–2025	Succeeded by Laurence Socha
