= Donald E. Booth =

American diplomat (born 1952)

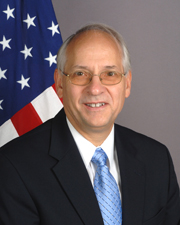

United States Special Envoy for Sudan
- In office June 10, 2019 – present
- President: Donald Trump
- Preceded by: himself

United States Special Envoy to Sudan and South Sudan
- In office August 28, 2013 – January 20, 2017
- President: Barack Obama
- Preceded by: Princeton Lyman
- Succeeded by: himself

United States Ambassador to Ethiopia
- In office April 21, 2010 – August 16, 2013
- President: Barack Obama
- Preceded by: Donald Yamamoto
- Succeeded by: Patricia Haslach

United States Ambassador to Zambia
- In office October 23, 2008 – March 17, 2010
- President: George W. Bush; Barack Obama
- Preceded by: Carmen Martinez
- Succeeded by: Mark Storella

United States Ambassador to Liberia
- In office August 9, 2005 – July 11, 2008
- President: George W. Bush
- Preceded by: John Blaney
- Succeeded by: Linda Thomas-Greenfield

Personal details
- Born: July 13, 1952 (age 74) Elmira, New York, U.S.
- Education: Georgetown University; Boston University; National Defense University

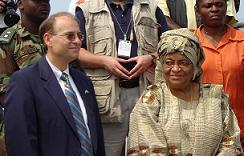
US Ambassador Donald E. Booth and Liberia's then–president-elect Ellen Johnson Sirleaf

Donald E. Booth (born 13 July 1952) is an American diplomat who is serving as the U.S. Special Envoy for Sudan. Between August 2013 and January 2017, he was the U.S. Special Envoy to Sudan and South Sudan. Prior to his appointments as special envoy, Booth served as the Ambassador of the United States to Liberia, Zambia, and Ethiopia.

== Early life ==
Booth attended Georgetown University, where he earned a bachelor's degree in foreign service; Boston University, where he earned an MBA; and the National War College, where he earned a master's degree in national security studies.

== Diplomatic career ==
Booth initially served in a number of diplomatic posts, including Economic Counselor in Athens, Division Chief of Bilateral Trade Affairs at the State Department, International Relations Officer in the Office of Eastern European Affairs, desk officer for the Office of Egyptian Affairs and the Office of East African Affairs, and various positions at the U.S. embassies to Romania, Gabon, Liberia, and Belgium.

Immediately prior to his appointment as ambassador to Liberia in 2005, he had served as deputy director of the Office of Southern African Affairs, Director of the Office of West African Affairs, and Director of the Office of Technical and Specialized Agencies in the State Department's Bureau of International Organization Affairs.

Booth was appointed Ambassador to Liberia by George W. Bush in 2005; he was confirmed by the U.S. Senate on June 16, 2005, and arrived in Liberia on July 29. On June 4, 2008, he was confirmed as the new U.S. ambassador to Zambia. He left his post in Liberia on July 11, and took up the post in Zambia on September 19.

He was nominated to become Ambassador to Ethiopia by President Barack Obama on December 9, 2009, and was confirmed by the U.S. Senate. He was nominated to become the U.S. Special Envoy to Sudan and South Sudan by President Obama on Wednesday, August 28, 2013. Booth served as the US Envoy to Sudan and South Sudan until 2017. He led the U.S. government's effort to "normalize relations" with the government of Sudan

The Trump administration re-appointed Donald Booth to be the Special Envoy for Sudan on June 10, 2019, and announced his appointment two days later.

Diplomatic posts
Preceded by John Blaney	United States Ambassador to Liberia; 2005–2008	Succeeded by Linda Thomas-Greenfield
Preceded by Carmen Martinez	United States Ambassador to Zambia; 2008–2010	Succeeded by Mark Storella
Preceded by Donald Yamamoto	United States Ambassador to Ethiopia; 2010–2013	Succeeded by Patricia Haslach
Preceded by Princeton Lyman	United States Special Envoy to Sudan and South Sudan; 2013–2017	Succeeded by Donald Booth
Preceded by Donald Booth	United States Special Envoy to Sudan; 2019–present	Incumbent
