= George Mu =

American diplomat

George Mu (born 1943 San Francisco) is an American Career Foreign Service Officer who served as the American Ambassador Extraordinary and Plenipotentiary to Ivory Coast (1998-2001). Mu is the first Commercial Service Officer to become an Ambassador. He was appointed to the rank of Career Minister in 1992, becoming the highest ranking Foreign Service Officer in the Commercial Service.

Mu graduated from the University of California, Berkeley.
