= Daniel Lewis Foote =

American diplomat

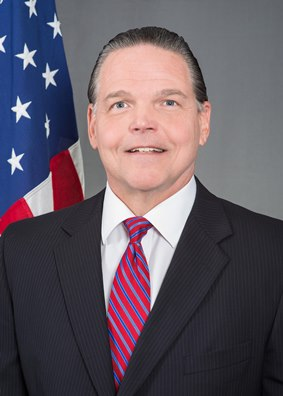
- Foote in 2017

United States Special Envoy for Haiti
- In office July 22, 2021 – September 23, 2021
- President: Joe Biden
- Preceded by: Position created

United States Ambassador to Zambia
- In office December 14, 2017 – January 2, 2020
- President: Donald Trump
- Preceded by: Eric Schultz
- Succeeded by: David J. Young (Chargé d'Affaires)

Personal details
- Born: Syracuse, New York, U.S.
- Spouse: Claudia
- Children: 2
- Education: Columbia University (BA)

Daniel Lewis Foote is an American diplomat and career member of the Senior Foreign Service who was the United States Special Envoy for Haiti from July to September 2021. He formerly served as the United States Ambassador to Zambia.

== Early life and education ==
A native of Syracuse, New York, Foote graduated from Williamsville East High School in 1981. He attended Columbia University, where he was a member of the school's football and track and field teams and graduated with a Bachelor of Arts degree in economics.

== Career ==
Foote began his career as a natural gas trader and broker. In 1992, he became a Peace Corps volunteer in Sopachuy, Bolivia. He later taught high school Spanish and coached football and track in Northern California.

In 1998, Foote joined the United States Department of State. He held positions at the State Department Operations Center, in the Bureau of European and Eurasian Affairs, at the U.S. Embassy in London, and in the U.S. consulate in Guadalajara, Mexico. He was part of the reconstruction team in Erbil, Iraq, was a management officer and political/economic chief in the U.S. Embassy in Luxembourg, and was a management counselor at the U.S. Embassy in Buenos Aires.

Foote also completed postings at the U.S. Embassy in Baghdad and as leader of the provincial reconstruction team in the Maysan Governorate. He went on to lead the activities of the Bureau of International Narcotics and Law Enforcement Affairs in Colombia. He was posted in both Port-au-Prince, Haiti, and Santo Domingo, Dominican Republic, as deputy chief of mission. In the Dominican Republic, he also served as chargé d'affaires. At the U.S. Embassy in Kabul, Afghanistan, Foote served as coordinating director, managing U.S. civilian foreign assistance and law enforcement activities in the country. In 2015, he took a role in Washington, D.C., at the Bureau of International Narcotics and Law Enforcement Affairs, where he oversaw operations in Afghanistan and Pakistan. In 2017, he was the Acting Assistant Secretary of State for International Narcotics and Law Enforcement Affairs when he was appointed United States Ambassador to Zambia.

As ambassador to Zambia, Foote strongly condemned the conviction of two men who had allegedly been convicted for having consensual sex acts. Foote said he was horrified by the verdict and questioned the destination of the development and economic aid given to Zambia. He was subsequently declared persona non grata and left the country.

After the assassination of Jovenel Moïse, Foote was selected to serve as United States special envoy for Haiti in the Biden administration on July 22, 2021. In the role, Foote was a member of President Joe Biden's delegation to Moïse's funeral.

On September 23, 2021, Foote resigned from his post of Special Envoy, effective immediately, citing the manner in which the United States had been handling the influx of Haitians who were fleeing their country's political unrest and natural disasters. In his resignation letter, Foote criticized the Biden administration, writing "I will not be associated with the United States' inhumane, counterproductive decision to deport thousands of Haitian refugees and illegal immigrants to Haiti, a country where American officials are confined to secure compounds because of the danger posed by armed gangs in control of daily life". Foote also stated that the United States had ignored and dismissed his recommendations regarding U.S. policy in Haiti.

== Personal life ==
Foote speaks Spanish.

Diplomatic posts
Preceded by Eric T. Schultz	United States Ambassador to Zambia; 2017–2020	Vacant
