= Robert E. Gribbin III =

American diplomat (born 1946)

Robert E. Gribbin III (born February 5, 1946 Durham, North Carolina) is a retired U.S. ambassador to Rwanda (1996–1999) and the Central African Republic (1993–1995) and author of In the Aftermath of Genocide: The U.S. role in Rwanda.

== Biography ==
Gribbin's father was an Episcopal clergyman who worked with many campus ministries. He spent much of his childhood in Tuscaloosa, Alabama at the University of Alabama. He graduated from the University of the South in Sewanee, Tennessee in 1968. After college, he served as a Peace Corps volunteer working with a team of civil engineers on implementing a water distribution system. When he returned to the United States, he became a project manager with Head Start (program) in Atlanta. He left after nine months to attend graduate school at the SAIS.

== Career ==
His first posting in the Foreign Service was in the Central African Republic.
