= Robert Thomas Hennemeyer =

Robert Thomas Hennemeyer (December 1, 1925 Chicago, Illinois - August 21, 2017 Bethesda, Maryland) was a diplomat for the United States for 35 years starting in 1952.

Hennemeyer served as consul general in Germany twice and was the US ambassador in The Gambia (1984–1986). He taught at the US Naval Academy. While in Tanganyika, he was taken hostage “during an army mutiny in then Tanganyika and narrowly escaped being executed by firing squad.”

He received his bachelor's degree and master's degrees at the University of Chicago and studied at Oxford University.

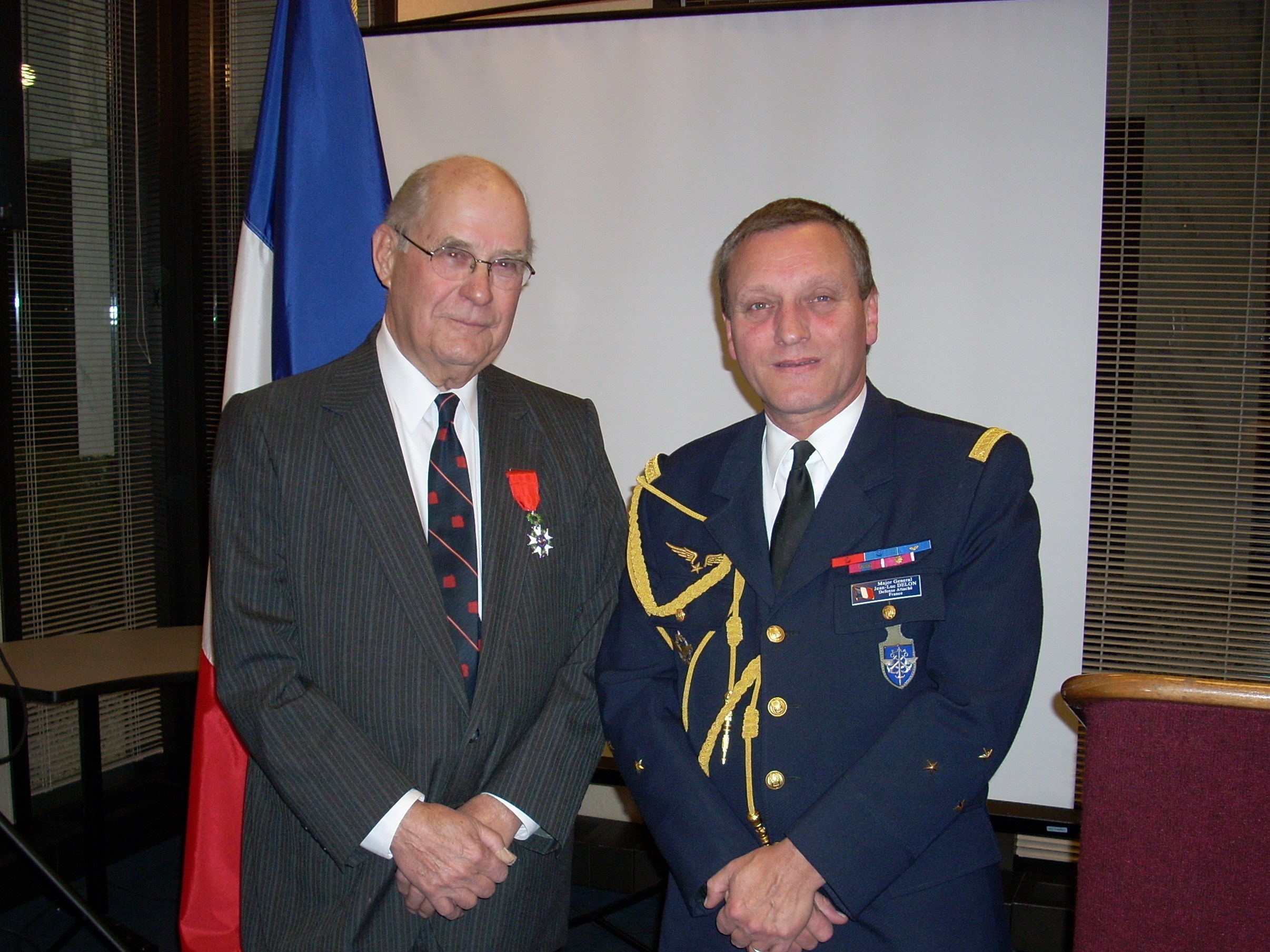
Robert Hennemeyer receiving Légion d'honneur

== Publications ==
- Forgiveness in International Politics: An Alternative Road to Peace co-author with William Bole and Drew Christiansen
