= Christopher R. Hill =

American diplomat (born 1952)

Christopher Hill
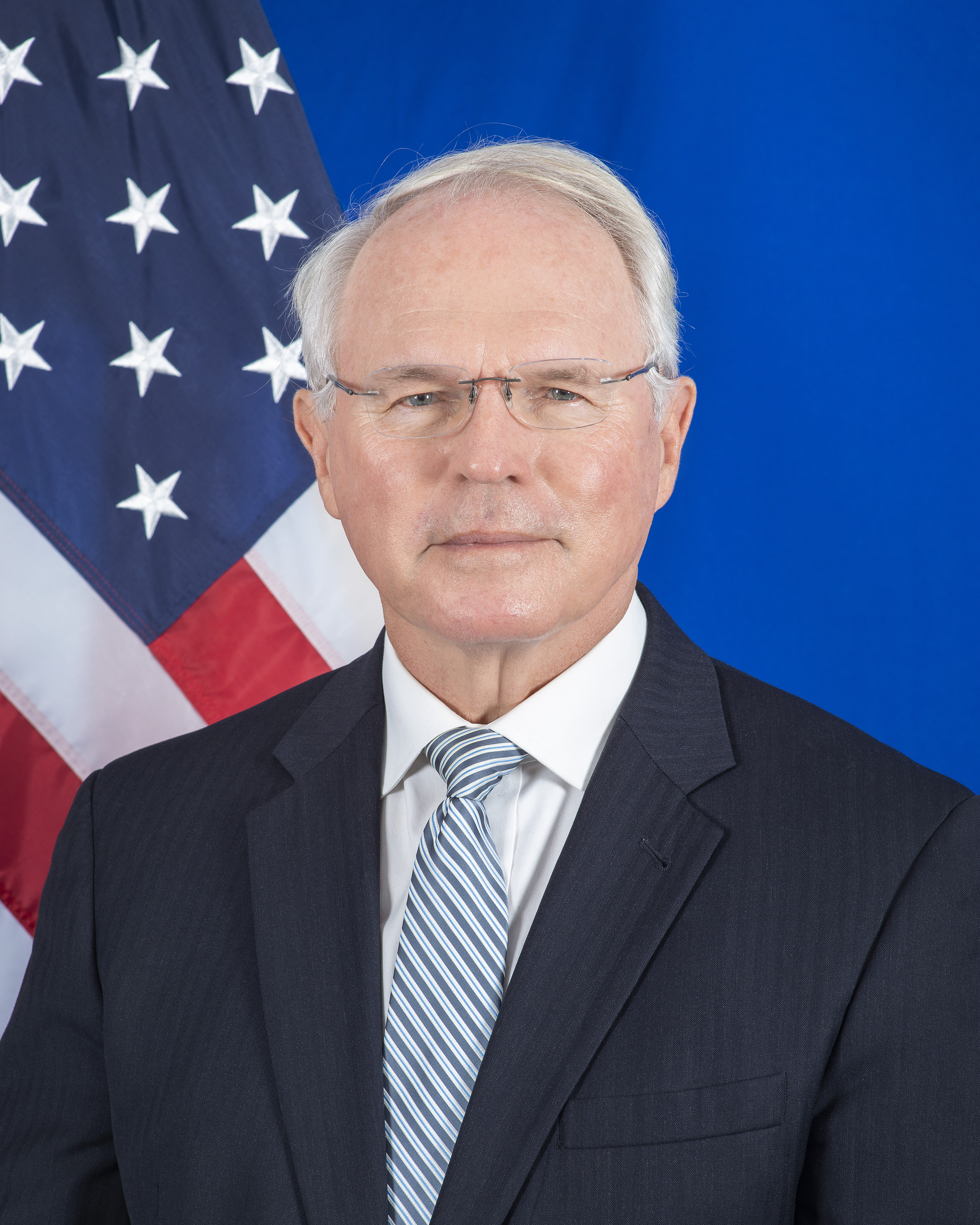
- Official portrait, 2022

United States Ambassador to Serbia
- In office March 31, 2022 – January 10, 2025
- President: Joe Biden
- Preceded by: Anthony Godfrey
- Succeeded by: Alexander Titolo (Acting)

United States Ambassador to Iraq
- In office April 24, 2009 – August 10, 2010
- President: Barack Obama
- Preceded by: Ryan Crocker
- Succeeded by: James Franklin Jeffrey

23rd Assistant Secretary of State for East Asian and Pacific Affairs
- In office April 8, 2005 – April 20, 2009
- President: George W. Bush; Barack Obama
- Preceded by: James A. Kelly
- Succeeded by: Kurt M. Campbell

United States Ambassador to South Korea
- In office September 1, 2004 – April 8, 2005
- President: George W. Bush
- Preceded by: Thomas C. Hubbard
- Succeeded by: Alexander R. Vershbow

United States Ambassador to Poland
- In office July 27, 2000 – April 14, 2004
- President: Bill Clinton; George W. Bush
- Preceded by: Daniel Fried
- Succeeded by: Victor Ashe

United States Ambassador to Macedonia
- In office July 29, 1996 – August 2, 1999
- President: Bill Clinton
- Preceded by: Victor Comras (acting)
- Succeeded by: M. Michael Einik

United States Ambassador to Albania Acting
- In office October 1, 1991 – December 21, 1991
- President: George H. W. Bush
- Preceded by: Hugh Gladney Grant (1939)
- Succeeded by: William Edwin Ryerson

Personal details
- Born: August 10, 1952 (age 74) Paris, France
- Spouse: Julie
- Education: Bowdoin College (BA); Naval War College (MA)
- Nickname: Bulldozer

Christopher Robert Hill (born August 10, 1952) is an American diplomat who had served as United States Ambassador to Serbia. Previously, he was George W. Ball Adjunct Professor at Columbia University in the City of New York, the Chief Advisor to the Chancellor for Global Engagement and Professor of the Practice in Diplomacy at the University of Denver. Prior to this position, he was the Dean of the Josef Korbel School of International Studies at the university, a position he held from September 2010 to December 2017.

== Education and Peace Corps service ==
Hill's father was a diplomat in the Foreign Service: Hill was born in Paris, and as a child, he traveled with his family to many countries. After American diplomats were expelled from Haiti, Hill's family moved to Little Compton, Rhode Island where Hill attended Moses Brown School in Providence, Rhode Island, graduating in 1970. He then went on to study at Bowdoin College, earning a Bachelor of Arts degree in economics in 1974.

Hill was a Peace Corps volunteer in Cameroon from 1974 to 1976. Hill credits his work with the Peace Corps for teaching him his first lessons in diplomacy. As a volunteer, Hill worked with credit unions and when he discovered that one board of directors had stolen 60 percent of their members' money, he reported on the malfeasance to their members, who promptly re-elected them because the board reflected carefully balanced tribal interests and it really did not matter to the members if the board directors ran a good credit union or not. Hill said the lesson was that "When something's happened, it's happened for a reason and you do your best to understand that reason. But don't necessarily think you can change it." Hill took the Foreign Service exam while he was serving as a Peace Corps volunteer in Cameroon.

Hill received a master's degree from the Naval War College in 1994. He speaks Polish, Serbo-Croatian and Macedonian.

== Diplomacy ==
Hill joined the State Department in 1977. Hill served as Secretary for Economic Affairs at the Embassy of the United States in Seoul from 1983 to 1985. When he returned to Korea in 2004 as Ambassador, he began by saying "I was here for three years in the 1980s, one has to be a little careful about drawing on too much experience from so long ago. So, even though I'll certainly draw on my experience from the 1980s, I think I also need to do an awful lot of listening to people to understand what has been going on lately."

Hill served as the U.S. Ambassador to Macedonia from 1996 to 1999, Special Envoy to Kosovo in 1998 and 1999, Ambassador to Poland from 2000 to 2004, and ambassador to the Republic of Korea from 2004 to 2005 before being appointed as Assistant Secretary of State for East Asian and Pacific Affairs. While on a fellowship with the American Political Science Association, Hill served as a member of the staff of Congressman Stephen Solarz.

In November 2006 President George W. Bush nominated Hill for the grade of career minister, the second-highest rank for career diplomats. The elite title is one step below career ambassador.

=== Bosnia peace settlement ===
Hill was part of the team that negotiated the Bosnia peace settlement. While working on Balkan issues, Hill worked closely with Richard Holbrooke, serving as his deputy at the Dayton Peace Talks in 1995. Holbrooke described Hill as "brilliant, fearless and argumentative" in his book on the Dayton negotiations and said that Hill manages to be both "very cool and very passionate." The combination, Holbrooke said, enhances Hill's "extremely good negotiating skills." Hill said the negotiations with the Bosnians, Serbs and Croats were successful because all the parties "were all ready to settle.'

Hill had a diplomatic failure as special envoy to Kosovo "because the Serbs were not ready to relinquish their stranglehold on Kosovo, so we ended up in a NATO bombing campaign." "Like a lot of things in life: you've got to do everything you can do" Hill said, to ensure "that you have left no stone unturned, that you have really tried."

=== Negotiations with North Korea ===
On February 14, 2005, Hill was named as the Head of the U.S. delegation to the six-party talks aimed at resolving the North Korean nuclear crisis.

In the first visit to North Korea by a senior American official in over five years, Hill flew into Pyongyang on June 21, 2007, for a two-day visit where he was warmly greeted by Ri Gun, the North's deputy nuclear negotiator at the airport. "We want to get the six-party process moving", Mr. Hill said. "We hope that we can make up for some of the time that we lost this spring, and so I'm looking forward to good discussions about that." The visit had been organized in secrecy. Hill had been visiting Tokyo and flew to South Korea and then on to Pyongyang on a small jet. Secretary of State Condoleezza Rice informed regional allies Japan and South Korea just before Hill's departure from Tokyo.

On July 14, 2007, North Korea informed Hill that they had shut down the nuclear reactor at Yongbyon and admitted an international inspection team. Hill cautioned that the shutdown was "just the first step." Verifying the declaration will be difficult, because for now the inspectors are limited to the Yongbyon complex.

On September 3, 2007 The New York Times reported that Hill met in Geneva for two days of one-on-one negotiations with Kim Kye-gwan, who heads the North Korean negotiating team, and that North Korea had agreed to disable its main nuclear fuel production plant by the end of 2007 and to account for all of its nuclear programs to international monitors. North Korea had also agreed to turn off its main nuclear reactor this summer. "One thing that we agreed on is that the D.P.R.K. will provide a full declaration of all of their nuclear programs and will disable their nuclear programs by the end of this year, 2007", Hill told reporters.

On December 20, 2007, the Korea Times reported that Kathleen Stephens, adviser to Hill at the State Department in the office of East Asia and Pacific Affairs, had been appointed as the next ambassador to South Korea. Sources said that Hill had recommended Stephens for the ambassadorial position for her understanding and experiences on Korean affairs. Stephens served as an advisor to Hill during the North Korean nuclear talks, and reportedly was working on a peace treaty for the Korean Peninsula.

On January 8, 2008 The New York Times reported that North Korea had missed a deadline to submit an inventory of its nuclear arms programs and that Hill said that failure to meet a deadline should be confronted with patience and perseverance. "They were prepared to give a declaration which wasn't going to be complete and correct and we felt that it was better for them to give us a complete one even if it's going to be a late one", said Hill.

On February 7, 2008, Hill told the Senate Foreign Relations Committee that talks with North Korea are at a "critical, challenging" point. Washington has refused to remove North Korea from its terrorism blacklist until the promised list of its nuclear efforts is provided. "Let me be clear", Hill said. " 'Complete and correct' means complete and correct. This declaration must include all nuclear weapons, programs, materials and facilities, including clarification of any proliferation activities."

On March 2, 2008, Hill said in an interview in Beijing that US diplomatic relations with Korea were possible before the end of the Bush administration if Korea completely dismantled its nuclear program. "We've told them we are not prepared to do that until they give up their nuclear materials", said Hill. "We can begin the process of discussing what we are going to do, whether we are going to open embassies, that sort of thing. But we will not have diplomatic relations with a nuclear North Korea."

On April 11, 2008 The Washington Post reported that a tentative deal has been reached with North Korea concerning a range of nuclear activities and the lifting of sanctions against North Korea. The agreement would include North Korea's disabling of its main nuclear facility and a complete accounting of North Korea's plutonium. "We are trying to focus on the plutonium as we try to resolve our suspicions on uranium enrichment", said chief U.S. negotiator Christopher R. Hill. "That's where the bombs are. We don't have suspicions about plutonium; we have cold, hard facts about plutonium."

=== US relationship with China ===
Although Hill is not well known in the United States, he has become a celebrity in China as chief envoy in talks on North Korea's nuclear weapons program. Part of the reason is that during negotiations Hill speaks every morning and evening to the media and has an easygoing manner, while his North Korean counterpart, Kim Kye Gwan, gives only occasional media access.

Hill says that the six party talks with North Korea have opened the door for fruitful dealings between the US and China in other areas. "We've worked diplomatically with them shoulder to shoulder. We haven't done this sort of thing before with China", says Hill. "At some point we have to figure out a way to deal with 1.3 billion people, and I think the six-party process has been a good one for that."

Hill said in an interview on April 21, 2008, in the Seattle Times that the United States' relationship with China is the most important bilateral relationship in the world. "I would say the China relationship is the most important bilateral relationship we have in the world", says Hill. "We have some 57 dialogues with Chinese counterparts, ranging from global warming to economic and trade issues. I would say we spend a great deal of time and attention on things Chinese with the understanding that in the long run we have to have a good working relationship with 1.3 billion people."

Hill says that China has been an active participant in the six-party talks. "China is a very active participant. It's an area we have succeeded in working with them very productively and pragmatically on an area of mutual concern", says Hill. "China looks at North Korea in very different ways from how we look at them. You have to recall they were a historical partner and ally. Chinese veterans associations trace their roots to the Korean War. All that said, China is very much convinced that North Korea needs to give up its nuclear ambitions."

Hill says that recent events in China and protests surrounding the torch relay for the Olympics may not result in improved human rights. "The Chinese people are very proud of hosting the Olympics. This sense of pride transcends political views within China", says Hill. "Even people who are extremely critical of their own government, and there are many Chinese who are very critical of their own government, even those people are filled with a sense of pride that China is hosting these Olympics. Many of them have taken the view that those who would somehow boycott the Olympics are doing so out of a desire to keep China down and otherwise humiliate and embarrass China. So it is an issue with great public resonance in China, going well beyond the question of the government."

=== Reputation in South Korea ===
Hill set a new precedent by closely approaching South Korea's contemporary culture and society. He was the first U.S. ambassador to pay respects at Gwangju's Mangwoldong May 18 National Cemetery for thousands of civilians who stood up for democracy and the hundreds who were massacred by the then-military government in May 1980. Many South Koreans suspected that the U.S. government allowed the attack, and no senior U.S. official had ever visited Mangwoldong before. According to Tami Overby, a senior official with the American Chamber of Commerce in South Korea, Hill served the shortest term in her 18 years of living in Seoul but had the most impact.

=== Relations with New Zealand ===
In May 2006, Hill described the New Zealand's 1985 anti-nuclear legislation as "a relic", and signaled that the US wanted a closer defence relationship with New Zealand. He also praised New Zealand's involvement in Afghanistan and reconstruction in Iraq. "Rather than trying to change each other's minds on the nuclear issue... I think we should focus on things we can make work", Hill said adding that the US would not demand to "put ships back into New Zealand."

=== Tenure in Iraq ===
US President Barack Obama nominated Christopher Hill for the post of U.S. Ambassador to Iraq on March 11, 2009. After having faced opposition from Republican Senators such as Sam Brownback, John McCain, and Lindsey Graham, Hill was approved on April 20 to be the U.S. ambassador to Iraq by the Senate with 73 votes for, and 23 against.

Hill extended his tenure in Iraq, totaling 16 months, postponing his own retirement from a career in diplomacy. While there, he was charged with reaching an agreement about the formation of an Iraqi-run government. Unfortunately, Hill couldn't break the months-long stalemate and called Iraq his most formidable challenge.

=== Tenure in Serbia ===
President Joe Biden announced Hill as his nominee to be the U.S. Ambassador to Serbia on October 14, 2021, and his nomination was sent to the Senate on October 28. Hearings on his nomination were held before the Senate Foreign Relations Committee on December 14, 2021. The committee favorably reported his nomination on January 12, 2022. On March 10, 2022, he was confirmed by the Senate by voice vote. He presented his credentials to President of Serbia Aleksandar Vucic on March 31, 2022.

== Awards and honors ==
Hill was a recipient of the Robert C. Frasure Award for Peace Negotiations for his work on the Kosovo crisis. The award is named for Hill's friend Bob Frasure, a fellow American diplomat killed in 1995 in Bosnia.

Hill was granted an award from the Macedonian Government to be honorary citizen because of his service as ambassador in Skopje and building up the U.S. - Macedonian relations.

In January 2006, Hill gave a lecture entitled "U.S. Policy in East Asia and the Pacific" at the University of San Diego's Joan B. Kroc Institute for Peace & Justice Distinguished Lecture Series.

In 2005, Hill was honored with the Naval War College Distinguished Graduate Leadership Award and in February 2008, Hill was awarded the "Building Bridges" Award by the Pacific Century Institute. The recipients are recognized as people who have enhanced relations between Americans and Asians and who exemplify PCI's commitment to building bridges to a better future.

In 2012, Hill was appointed as an honorary Member of the New Zealand Order of Merit in the 2013 New Year Honours.

== Controversies ==
In a September 8, 2016 segment with anchors Joe Scarborough, Mika Brzezinski, and Willie Geist on MSNBC's Morning Joe that appeared following 2016 Libertarian presidential candidate Gary Johnson's appearance on the news program that same day, Hill criticized Johnson for his lack of knowledge on the location and significance of Aleppo, Syria during the earlier interview with the hosts and Mike Barnicle. He mocked Johnson for his apparent confusion and "blank stare," proclaiming that he would likely be forevermore known as "Aleppo Johnson" and that it would probably be the end of his presidential bid, but himself erroneously referred to Aleppo as "the capital of ISIS" despite having previously served as the US ambassador to neighboring Iraq. While Scarborough, Brzezinski, and Geist did not correct this verbal mistake on-air, numerous news outlets and commentators noted Hill's own gaffe in their coverage of Johnson, and critiqued him for his hypocrisy.

In March 2018, Hill referred to the passage of the anti-defamation legislation by the Polish parliament as "revenge of the peasants".

== Personal life ==
Hill is married to the former Julie Ann Ryczek, a school teacher and health and nutrition advocate from Treasure Island, Florida. He has three grown children, Nathaniel, Amelia and Clara. Hill speaks Serbo-Croatian, Polish, Macedonian and French.

Hill lives in Florida.

== Publications ==
- Outpost: Life on the Frontlines of American Diplomacy: a Memoir (Simon and Schuster, 2014).

== Citations ==
Diplomatic posts
| Vacant Title last held by Hugh Gladney Grant; 1939 | United States Ambassador to Albania; Acting; 1991 | Succeeded by William Edwin Ryerson |
| Preceded by Victor D. Comras; Acting | United States Ambassador to Macedonia; 1996–1999 | Succeeded by M. Michael Einik |
| Preceded by Daniel Fried | United States Ambassador to Poland; 2000–2004 | Succeeded by Victor Ashe |
| Preceded by Thomas C. Hubbard | United States Ambassador to South Korea; 2004–2005 | Succeeded by Alexander Vershbow |
| Preceded by Ryan Crocker | United States Ambassador to Iraq; 2009–2010 | Succeeded by James Franklin Jeffrey |
| Preceded by Anthony Godfrey | United States Ambassador to Serbia; 2022–2025 | Vacant |
Political offices
| Preceded by James A. Kelly | Assistant Secretary of State for East Asian and Pacific Affairs; 2005–2009 | Succeeded by Kurt M. Campbell |
