= List of ambassadors of the United States to Ivory Coast =

Ambassador of the United States to Ivory Coast
- Seal of the United States Department of State

- Flag of a United States ambassador

- Incumbent; Junaid "Jay" Munir; Chargé d'affaires since January 17, 2026
- U.S. Department of State
- Nominator: The president of the United States
- Appointer: The president; with Senate advice and consent
- Inaugural holder: Donald R. Norland as ad Interim
- Formation: August 1960
- Website: U.S. Embassy – Abidjan

This is a list of ambassadors of the United States to Ivory Coast, also known as Côte d'Ivoire.

- August 1960 – October 1960: Donald R. Norland (ad Interim)
- 20 November 1960 – 12 May 1962: R. Borden Reams (Ambassador)
- 27 November 1962 – 6 March 1965: James Wine (Ambassador)
- 5 August 1965 – 16 November 1969: George A. Morgan (Ambassador)
- 23 December 1969 – 6 March 1974: John F. Root (Ambassador)
- 11 April 1974 – 8 August 1976: Robert Solwin Smith (Ambassador)
- 13 November 1976 – 12 July 1979: Monteagle Stearns (Ambassador)
- 16 January 1980 – 16 August 1983: Nancy V. Rawls (Ambassador)
- 18 November 1983 – 3 August 1986: Robert H. Miller (Ambassador)
- 2 December 1986 – 8 October 1989: Dennis Kux (Ambassador)
- 22 November 1989 – 3 July 1992: Kenneth L. Brown (Ambassador)
- 10 September 1992 – 6 July 1995: Hume Alexander Horan (Ambassador)
- 6 October 1995 – 28 September 1998: Lannon Walker (Ambassador)
- 6 January 1999 – 12 July 2001: George Mu (Ambassador)
- 19 December 2001 – 23 July 2004: Arlene Render (Ambassador)
- 6 August 2004 – August 2007: Aubrey Hooks (Ambassador)
- 25 September 2007 – 10 August 2010: Wanda Nesbitt (Ambassador)
- 23 August 2010 – 27 August 2013:Phillip Carter III (Ambassador)
- 21 November 2013 – August 2016:Terence McCulley (Ambassador)
- August 2016 – August 2017:Andrew Haviland (Chargé d'Affaires)
- August 2017 – September 2019:Katherine Brucker (Chargé d'Affaires)
- 10 October 2019 – 31 January 2023: Richard K. Bell (Ambassador)
- 2 March 2023 – 16 January 2026: Jessica Davis Ba (Ambassador)

== See also ==
- Ivory Coast – United States relations
- Foreign relations of Ivory Coast
- Ambassadors of the United States
