= Monteagle Stearns =

American diplomat

- Stearns in 1981

United States Ambassador to Ivory Coast
- In office 1976–1979
- President: Gerald Ford; Jimmy Carter
- Preceded by: Robert S. Smith
- Succeeded by: Nancy V. Rawls

United States Ambassador to Greece
- In office 1981–1985
- President: Ronald Reagan
- Preceded by: Robert J. McCloskey
- Succeeded by: Robert Vossler Keeley

Personal details
- Born: December 5, 1924 Cambridge, Massachusetts, U.S.
- Died: May 14, 2016 (aged 91) Belmont, Massachusetts, U.S.
- Spouse: Antonia Riddleberger
- Children: 6
- Education: Columbia University
- Profession: Diplomat

Monteagle "Monty" Stearns (December 5, 1924 – May 14, 2016) was an American diplomat and author. He served as Ambassador to Côte d'Ivoire (Ivory Coast; 1976–79) and Greece (1981–85).

Born in Cambridge, Massachusetts, he attended Columbia University in 1948 and graduated with his B.A. He was a member of the American Academy of Diplomacy and Council on Foreign Relations. He was married to Antonia Riddleberger and had 6 children. He was the son-in-law of James W. Riddleberger.

Stearns grew up in Carmel, California and in New England. In 1943, while at Stanford University, he enlisted in the Marine Corps, completed Officer Candidate School and was assigned to the U.S.S. West Virginia. Following WWII, he graduated from the College with a degree in English. A Foreign Service officer for more than 40 years, he served in Turkey, the Congo, the UK, Laos, as U.S. Ambassador to the Ivory Coast, and three tours in Greece, the last also as ambassador.

== Honors ==
In 2014, he was made Grand Commander of the Order of the Phoenix by the president of the Hellenic Republic.

== Death ==
Stearns died on May 14, 2016, aged 91, in Belmont, Massachusetts. He was survived by his wife of 57 years, Antonia Stearns (née Riddleberger); a sister (Mrs. Mary Lou Roppoli), six children, and eight grandchildren.

== Books ==
- Stearns, Monteagle (1992). Entangled Allies: U.S. Policy Toward Greece, Turkey, and Cyprus. Council on Foreign Relations Press. ISBN 0-87609-110-9.
- Stearns, Monteagle (1996). Talking to Strangers: Improving American Diplomacy at Home and Abroad. Princeton University Press. ISBN 0-691-01130-3.

Diplomatic posts
Preceded by Robert Solwin Smith	United States Ambassador to Côte d'Ivoire; 1976–1978	Succeeded by Nancy V. Rawls
Preceded by Robert J. McCloskey	United States Ambassador to Greece; 1985–1989	Succeeded by Michael G. Sotirhos
