= List of ambassadors of the United States to North Macedonia =

Ambassador of the United States to North Macedonia
- Seal of the United States Department of State

- Flag of a United States ambassador

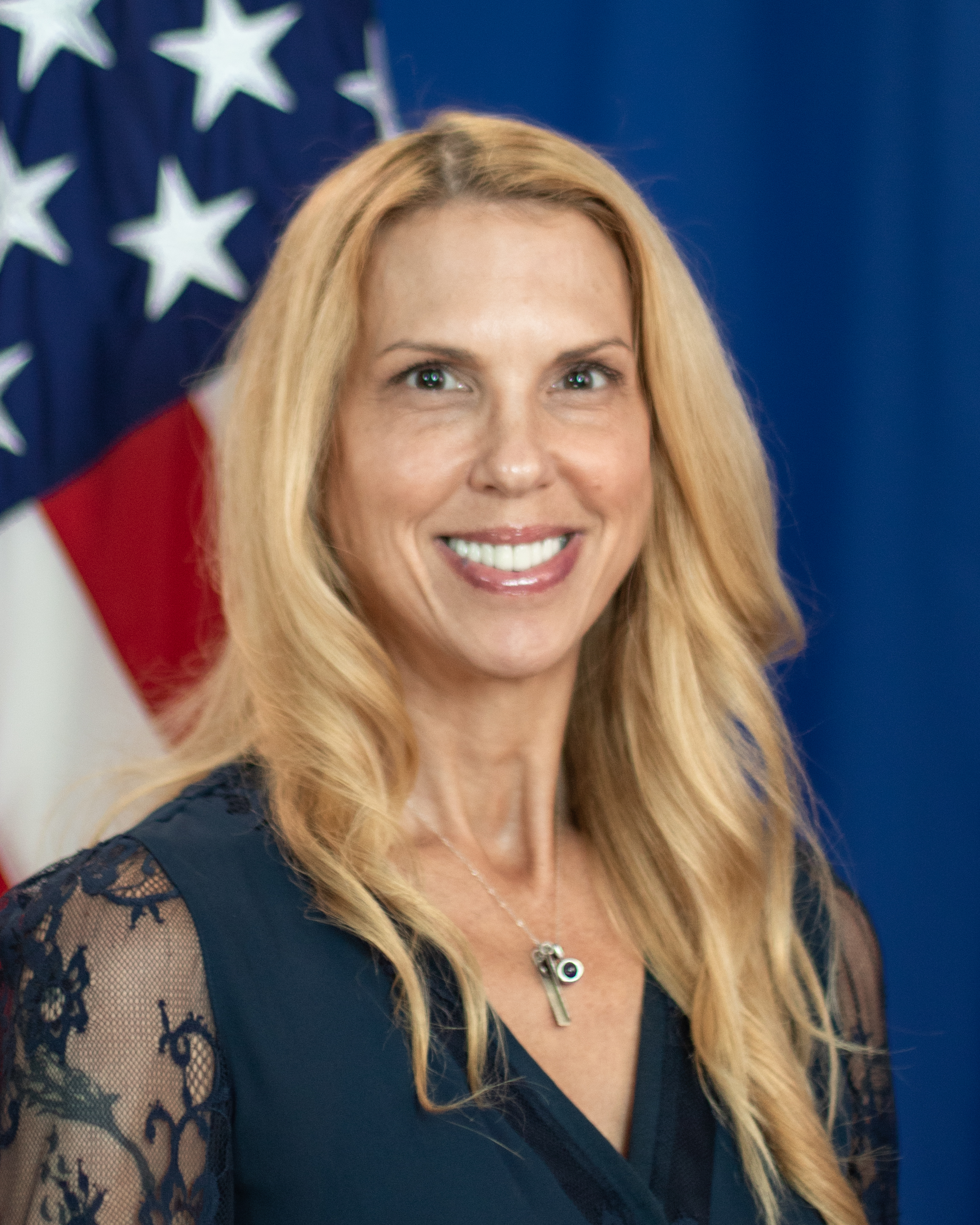
- Incumbent; Nicole Vernes; Chargé d'affaires since January 23, 2026
- Nominator: The president of the United States
- Appointer: The president with Senate advice and consent
- Inaugural holder: Christopher R. Hill
- Formation: July 29, 1996
- Website: U.S. Embassy - Skopje

The United States ambassador to North Macedonia is the official representative of the president of the United States to the head of state of North Macedonia.

The Ambassador, based out of Skopje, works with the rest of the embassy – 70 other Americans and nearly 240 locals – to advance bilateral relations, support North Macedonia's efforts to improve its economy, care for democracy in North Macedonia and strengthen its judicial and law enforcement capacities in fighting corruption, human trafficking and organised crime.

The United States established a liaison office in what was then the Republic of Macedonia in Skopje on December 3, 1993 with Victor D. Comras appointed soon after as Charge and U.S. chief of Mission with the equivalent rank of Ambassador. The U.S. formally recognized Macedonia as an independent state on February 9, 1994.

== Ambassadors and chiefs of mission ==
Image	Name	Presentation of credentials	Termination of mission	Title
	Victor D. Comras	December 3, 1993	July 2, 1996	Chief of Mission
	Christopher R. Hill	July 29, 1996	August 2, 1999	Ambassador Extraordinary and Plenipotentiary
	M. Michael Einik	September 7, 1999	November 4, 2001	Ambassador Extraordinary and Plenipotentiary
	Lawrence E. Butler	April 22, 2002	March 26, 2005	Ambassador Extraordinary and Plenipotentiary
	Gillian A. Milovanovic	September 6, 2005	August 30, 2008	Ambassador Extraordinary and Plenipotentiary
	Philip T. Reeker	September 29, 2008	July 15, 2011	Ambassador Extraordinary and Plenipotentiary
	Paul D. Wohlers	September 13, 2011	January 21, 2015	Ambassador Extraordinary and Plenipotentiary
	Jess L. Baily	February 12, 2015	March 1, 2019	Ambassador Extraordinary and Plenipotentiary
	Kate Marie Byrnes	July 12, 2019	September 26, 2022	Ambassador Extraordinary and Plenipotentiary
	Angela P. Aggeler	November 8, 2022	January 22, 2026	Ambassador Extraordinary and Plenipotentiary
	Nicole Vernes	January 23, 2026	Incumbent	Chargé d'affaires ad interim

== See also ==
- North Macedonia–United States relations
- Foreign relations of North Macedonia
- Ambassadors of the United States
