= Lawrence E. Butler =

American diplomat (born 1953)

Lawrence Butler
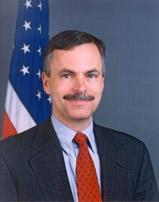

3rd United States Ambassador to Macedonia
- In office April 22, 2002 – March 26, 2005
- President: George W. Bush
- Preceded by: M. Michael Einik
- Succeeded by: Gillian Milovanovic

Personal details
- Born: 1953 (age 72–73)
- Education: Bowdoin College (B.A.); University of Michigan; Princeton University
- Occupation: Diplomat

Lawrence E. Butler (born 1953) was the United States Ambassador to the Republic of Macedonia from 2002 to 2005.

== Life and career ==
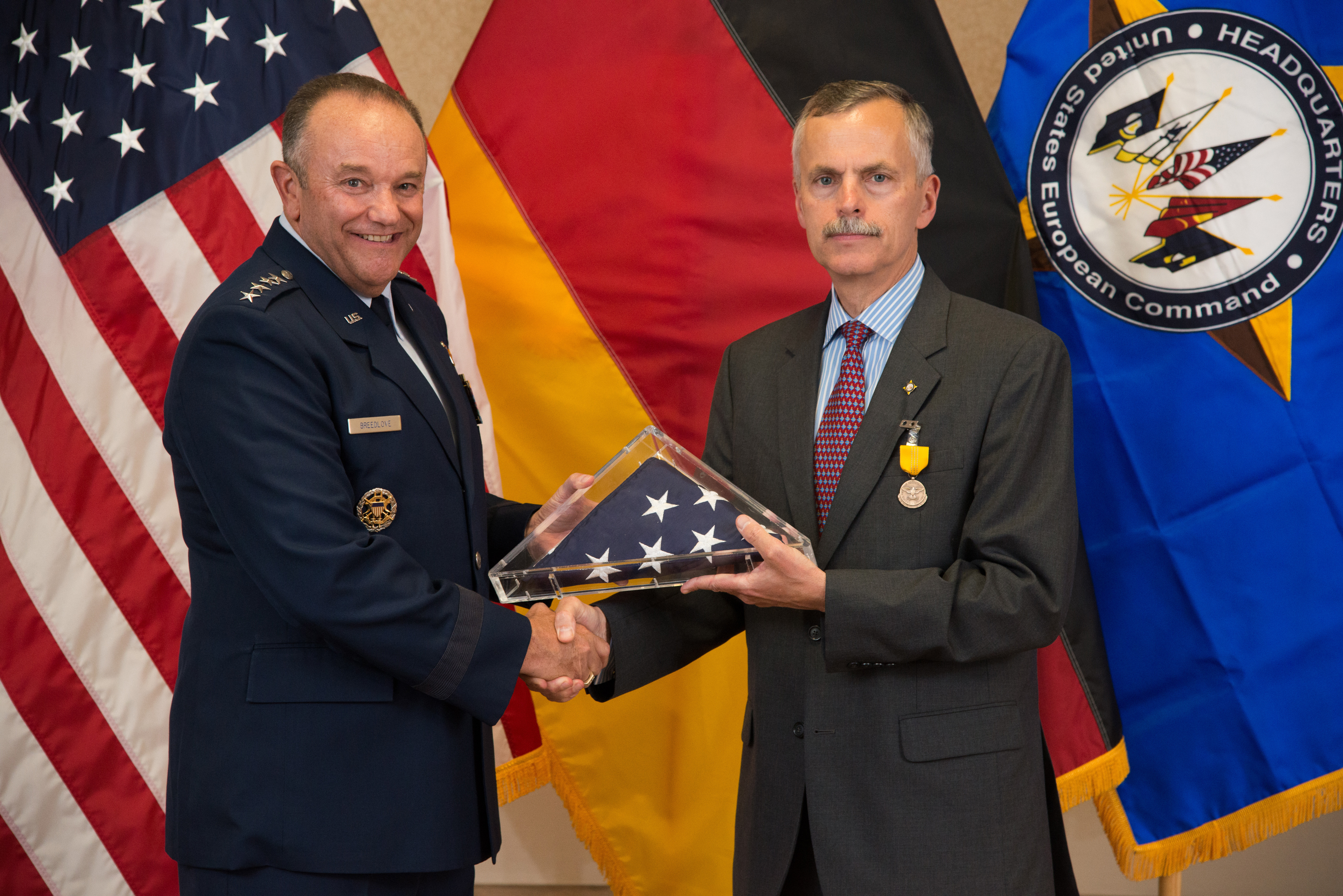
Ambassador Lawrence Butler with Supreme Allied Commander Europe General Philip M. Breedlove in Patch Barracks, Vaihingen, Germany on July 16, 2013.

Butler received his B.A. from Bowdoin College and did graduate work for an M.B.A. the University of Michigan's Ross School of Business and was selected to do graduate work at Princeton University's Woodrow Wilson School as a Mid-Career Fellow.

After having been a member of the Foreign Service since 1976, he became a member of the Senior Foreign Service in 1997. He served as Director for European Affairs on the National Security Council staff at the White House from 1997 to 1999. In this position he was important in the development of the Good Friday Agreement in the Northern Ireland peace process. He also covered the European Union, thus preparing the then twice-yearly U.S.-EU Summits and handling relations with the Nordic states, UK, Ireland and Germany. While in Belgrade, he engaged directly with SFRY President Slobodan Milosevic to facilitate the Dayton Accord negotiations and subsequently helped implement the Dayton Accord and open the first U.S. Office in Kosovo. Previously, he had served in 1993 in Kosovo on a conflict prevention mission under the aegis of the Conference for Security and Cooperation in Europe.

As ambassador in Skopje, Butler worked with the European Union Special Representative, as well as with the OSCE, NATO and other international organization representatives, to implement the 2001 Ohrid Framework Agreement that ended Macedonia's insurgency. As part of that, he focused on supporting the government on efforts to become a future member of NATO and the European Union. He was selected by Lord Ashdown to serve as Principal High Deputy Representative at the Office of High Representative and EU Special Representative for Bosnia and Herzegovina, serving in Sarajevo from March 2005 to January 2006.

During this period, he was seconded from the U.S. State Department. He returned to the State Department in January 2007 to be the Deputy Assistant Secretary for Near Eastern Affairs, as part of the New Way Forward policy implementation team that successfully diminished violence and improved governance in Iraq.

Ambassador Butler would go on to serve distinguished tours as POLAD to NATO's Supreme Allied Commander at Mons, Belgium, as POLAD to the commander of U.S. forces in Iraq, and finally as the Civilian Deputy and POLAD to the Commander of the United States European Command, Patch Barracks, Stuttgart, Germany. He formally retired from the U.S. Foreign Service in September 2013.

Diplomatic posts
Preceded by M. Michael Einik	United States Ambassador to Macedonia; 2002–2005	Succeeded by Gillian A. Milovanovic
