= Kate Marie Byrnes =

American diplomat (born 1971)

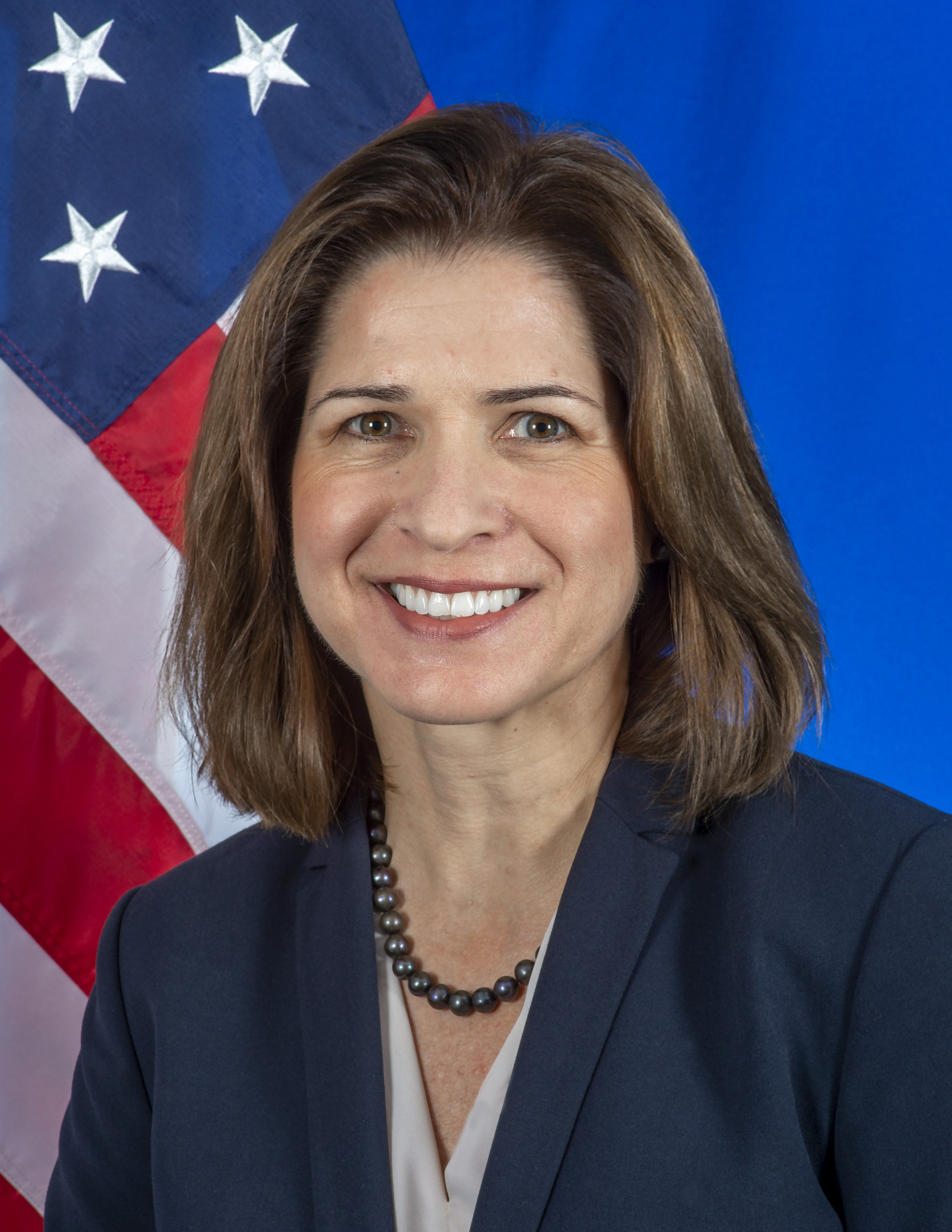

8th United States Ambassador to North Macedonia
- In office July 12, 2019 – September 26, 2022
- President: Donald Trump; Joe Biden
- Preceded by: Jess Baily
- Succeeded by: Angela Aggeler

Personal details
- Born: 1971 (age 54–55)
- Citizenship: United States
- Spouse: Larry Scott Gage
- Education: Georgetown University (B.S., M.A.)
- Occupation: Diplomat
- Awards: Eight Superior Honor Award and Meritorious Honor Awards; Expeditionary Service Award from the U.S. Department of State; Two Meritorious Civilian Service Awards from the U.S. Department of the Army

Military service
- Years of service: 24

Kate Marie Byrnes (born 1971) is an American diplomat, who served as the United States ambassador to North Macedonia between July 2019 and September 2022. She is a career diplomat who has received many awards for her service.

== Education ==
Byrnes has a bachelor of science in international relations (foreign service) from Georgetown University, and a master's degree in policy management, also from Georgetown.

== Career ==
=== Diplomatic service ===
During her time in the diplomatic service, she served in Spain, Hungary, and Belgium. She also served as the deputy chief of mission of the United States Mission to the Organization for Security and Cooperation in Europe, where she expressed dismay at Russian aggression against Ukraine. After that, she became deputy chief of mission in Greece from 2017 to 2019.

From 2007 through 2010, she was a public affairs advisor to the United States Mission to the North Atlantic Treaty Organization. She has previously represented U.S. interests in Bolivia, Hungary, Spain, and Turkey.

=== Ambassador to North Macedonia ===
She was originally nominated to North Macedonia in 2018, and re-nominated in 2019, both before and after the nation changed its name. Byrnes was appointed to replace Ambassador Jess Baily.

A career diplomat, she had served as the deputy ambassador in Athens, and was the designated representative of the U.S. mission to the Organization for Security and Cooperation in Europe in Vienna. Addressing the United States Senate during her confirmation hearings, she averred her continuing commitment "to strengthen cooperation with (North) Macedonia as a strategic partner." She highlighted that the Prespes agreement surmounted an historic hurdle, so its implementation is regionally important. Upon her appointment, acting Assistant Secretary of State Philip Reeker saw her appointment as a harbinger of "a new era of bilateral cooperation, as friends and allies of the Republic of Macedonia." She brought twenty-four years experience as a diplomat before being appointed to the post.

Fulfilling its responsibility under the Foreign Service Act, Section 304(a)(4), the Senate Foreign Relations Committee noted that she has a well-documented path of competency in extremely demanding positions. (Note: "Ms. Byrnes also served as Public Affairs Counselor at the U.S. Embassy Madrid Spain, 2011 – 2014 and, in a further demonstration of the breadth of her leadership, she served as the U.S. Department of State Senior Civilian Representative to Task Force Bastogne/Bronco, Jalalabad Airfield, Afghanistan, 2010 – 2011. Ms. Byrnes’ distinguished record of leadership, coupled with her considerable experience in European affairs and on the process of accession to NATO and the European Union, make her an excellent candidate to serve as U.S. Ambassador to the Republic of Macedonia.")

== Personal ==
Byrnes is married to Larry Scott Gage, a retired naval officer. She speaks Spanish, Hungarian and Turkish.

== Awards ==
- Eight Superior Honor Award and Meritorious Honor Awards
- Expeditionary Service Award from the U.S. Department of State
- Two Meritorious Civilian Service Awards from the U.S. Department of the Army.

== See also ==
- List of current ambassadors of the United States
- List of ambassadors appointed by Donald Trump

Diplomatic posts
Preceded by Jess Baily	United States Ambassador to North Macedonia; 2019–2022	Succeeded by Angela Aggeler
