= Terence McCulley =

American diplomat

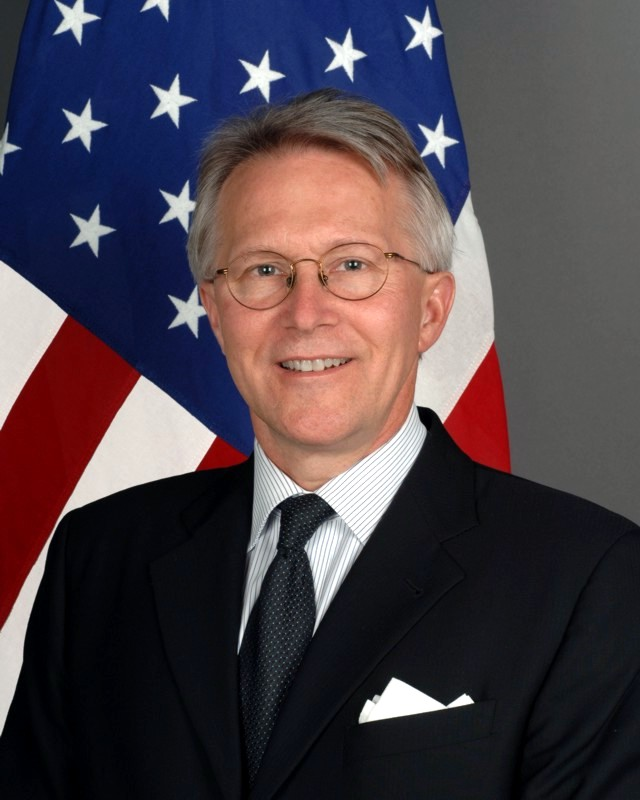

United States Ambassador to the Ivory Coast
- In office November 21, 2013 – August 2016
- President: Barack Obama
- Preceded by: Phillip Carter
- Succeeded by: Andrew Haviland (Chargé d'Affaires)

United States Ambassador to Nigeria
- In office November 2, 2010 – August 29, 2013
- President: Barack Obama
- Preceded by: Robin Sanders
- Succeeded by: James Entwistle

United States Ambassador to Mali
- In office September 2, 2005 – July 4, 2008
- President: George W. Bush
- Preceded by: Vicki Huddleston
- Succeeded by: Gillian Milovanovic

Personal details
- Born: Terence Patrick McCulley; 1957 (age 68–69) Medford, Oregon, U.S.
- Spouse: Renée McCulley
- Education: University of Oregon; Tufts University

Terence Patrick McCulley (born 1957) is the former United States Ambassador to The Ivory Coast and a retired member of the Senior Foreign Service, with the rank of Minister-Counselor. McCulley was nominated by President Barack Obama to this post on June 26, 2013, and presented his credentials to Ivorian President Alassane Ouattara on November 21, 2013. He is currently the Senior Managing Director of the Africa practice at McLarty Associates and the Chairman of the U.S.-Nigeria Council.

Previously, McCulley was Ambassador to Nigeria from 2010 to 2013. Before that, he was Deputy Chief of Mission at the U.S. Embassy in Copenhagen, Denmark from 2008 to 2010 and served as U.S. Ambassador to the Republic of Mali from 2005 to 2008. From 2004 to 2005, he worked at the State Department in Washington, helping to coordinate reconstruction efforts in Iraq. He has been the Deputy Chief of Mission at the U.S. Embassies in Togo, Senegal, and Tunisia and also served as Consul in Mumbai, India.

Joining the Foreign Service in 1985, McCulley started his career in Niger, followed by assignments in South Africa and Chad. Returning to Washington in 1993, he worked for two years on Central African affairs. According to the State Department, McCulley is the recipient of four Department of State Superior Honor Awards.

Ambassador McCulley was born in Medford, Oregon, and grew up in Eugene, where he graduated with a Bachelor of Arts degree in European History and French Language and Literature from the University of Oregon. As a Rotary Foundation Graduate Fellow, he studied political science at the Université de Haute Bretagne in Rennes, France. In addition, he attended the Fletcher School of Law and Diplomacy. McCulley is fluent in French.

Married to Renée McCulley, the couple have two sons.

Diplomatic posts
Preceded by Vicki Huddleston	United States Ambassador to Mali; 2005–2008	Succeeded by Gillian Milovanovic
Preceded by Robin Sanders	United States Ambassador to Nigeria; 2010–2013	Succeeded by James Entwistle
Preceded by Phillip Carter	United States Ambassador to the Ivory Coast; 2013–2016	Vacant
