= Paul D. Wohlers =

American diplomat

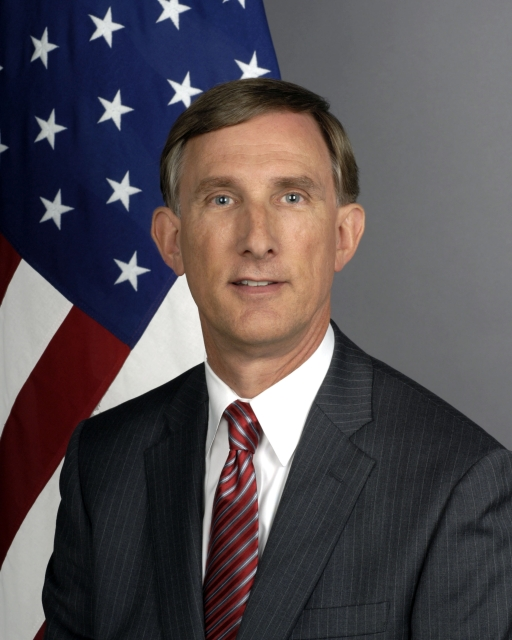

6th United States Ambassador to Macedonia
- In office September 13, 2011 – January 21, 2015
- President: Barack Obama
- Preceded by: Philip Reeker
- Succeeded by: Jess L. Baily

Personal details
- Relations: Laurence D. Wohlers (brother)
- Education: United States Naval Academy (B.S.); University of Washington School of Law (J.D.)

Paul D. Wohlers is a U.S. diplomat who served from 2011 to 2015 as the U.S. ambassador to Macedonia, stationed at the U.S. embassy in Skopje.

Wohlers graduated from the United States Naval Academy in 1974 with a B.S. in international affairs. He then served as a naval flight officer, attached to the aircraft carrier USS Dwight D. Eisenhower. He earned a J.D. from the University of Washington School of Law in 1982.

Early in his career with the U.S. State Department, Wohlers held posts at the U.S. embassies in Bucharest, Moscow, and Nicosia. He worked on arms control issues in the Bureau of Political-Military Affairs and was desk officer for Bangladesh in the Bureau of South Asian Affairs. He also served on the Executive Secretariat staff.

Wohlers also served as director of the Office of Caucasus Affairs and Regional Conflicts in the Bureau of European and Eurasian Affairs, deputy chief of mission and chargé d'affaires at the U.S. embassy in Skopje, deputy director of the Executive Secretariat staff, senior watch officer in the operations center, and as deputy executive secretary at the U.S. Department of State.

Wolhers was appointed by President Barack Obama to serve as the sixth U.S. ambassador to the Republic of Macedonia and was unanimously confirmed by the United States Senate on August 2, 2011. He was sworn in by Secretary of State Hillary Clinton on August 11, 2011, arrived in Skopje on September 12, and presented his credentials to the President of the Republic of Macedonia on September 13, 2011.

Wohlers is married and has three daughters. His brother, Laurence D. Wohlers, was the U.S. ambassador to the Central African Republic from 2010 to 2013.

== See also ==
- List of ambassadors to Macedonia

Diplomatic posts
Preceded by Philip T. Reeker	United States Ambassador to Macedonia; 2011–2014	Succeeded by Jess L. Baily
