= Richard K. Bell =

American diplomat

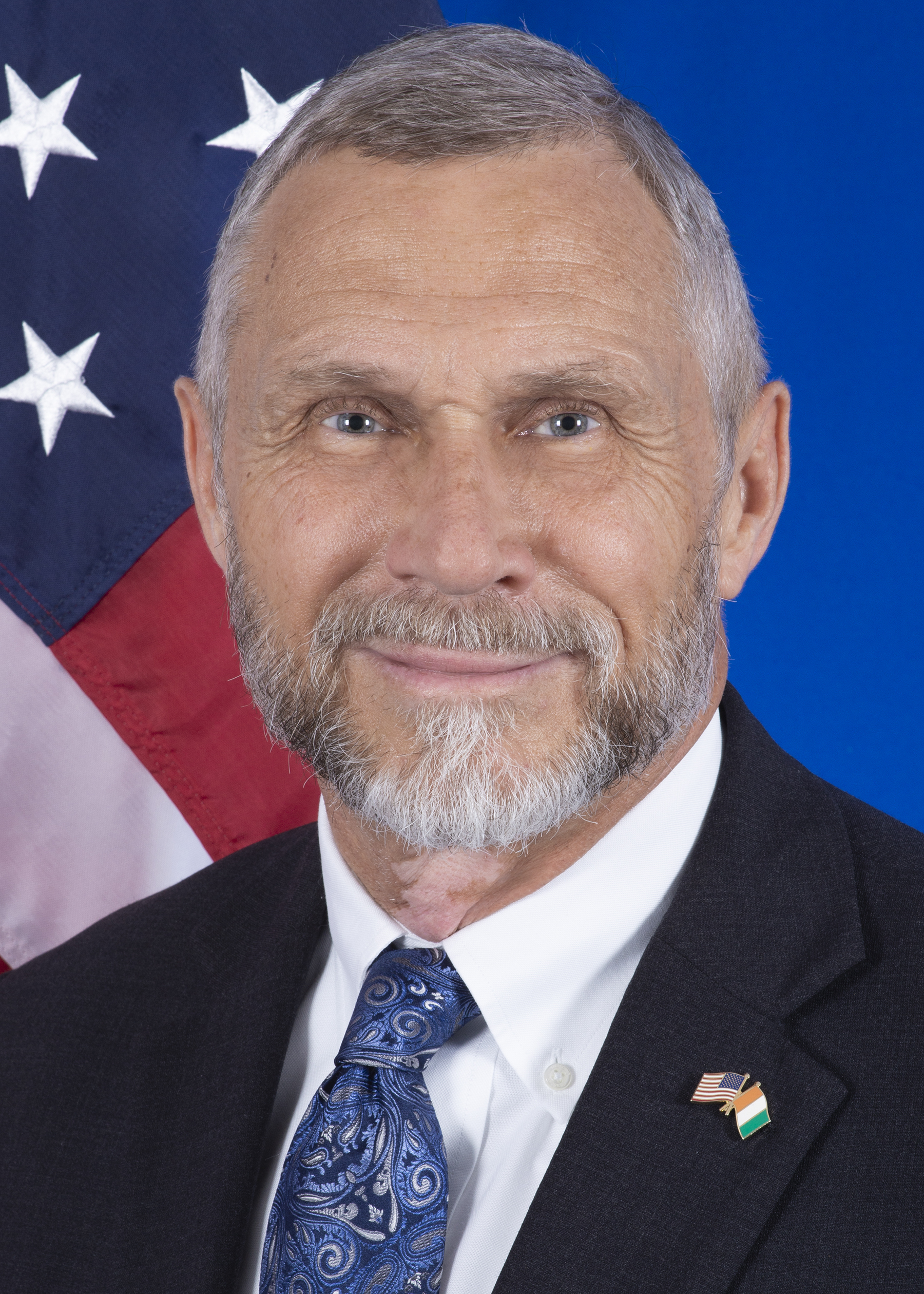

United States Ambassador to Ivory Coast
- In office October 10, 2019 – January 31, 2023
- President: Donald Trump; Joe Biden
- Preceded by: Katherine Brucker; Chargé d'affaires
- Succeeded by: Jessica Davis Ba

Personal details
- Education: Pennsylvania State University (B.A.); Boston University, Ben-Gurion University of the Negev (M.S.)

Richard Keith Bell is an American diplomat who served as the United States Ambassador to Ivory Coast from October 10, 2019, to January 31, 2023.

== Education ==
Bell earned his Bachelor of Arts from Pennsylvania State University in French and a Master of Science in Management from Boston University’s International Program at Ben-Gurion University of the Negev, in Beersheba, Israel.

== Career ==
Early in his career, Bell was Team Leader of the Provincial Reconstruction Team in Salahaddin, Iraq, and the regional coordinator for Northeast Iraq and provincial reconstruction team leader in Kirkuk, Iraq. Previous assignments include as foreign policy advisor to the United States Africa Command, Stuttgart, Germany, Deputy Chief of Mission at the United States Embassy in Niamey, Niger, and head of the Political and Economic Affairs Section of the United States Embassy in Copenhagen, Denmark. Most recently he served as Chargé d'affaires for the Embassy in N’Djamena, Chad.

=== Ambassador to Cote d'Ivoire ===
On November 26, 2018, President Trump nominated Bell as the next United States Ambassador to Côte d'Ivoire. Hearings were held on his nomination before the Senate Foreign Relations Committee on July 17, 2019. The committee reported his nomination favorably on July 25, 2019. On August 1, 2019, Bell's nomination was confirmed by voice vote in the United States Senate. He presented his credentials to President Alassane Ouattara on October 10, 2019.

== Personal life ==
Bell speaks French and Arabic.

== See also ==
- List of ambassadors of the United States

Diplomatic posts
Preceded by Katherine Brucker; Chargé d'affaires	United States Ambassador to Ivory Coast; 2019–2023	Succeeded by Jessica Davis Ba
