= Dwight Dickinson =

United States Navy officer and diplomat

Dwight Dickinson III
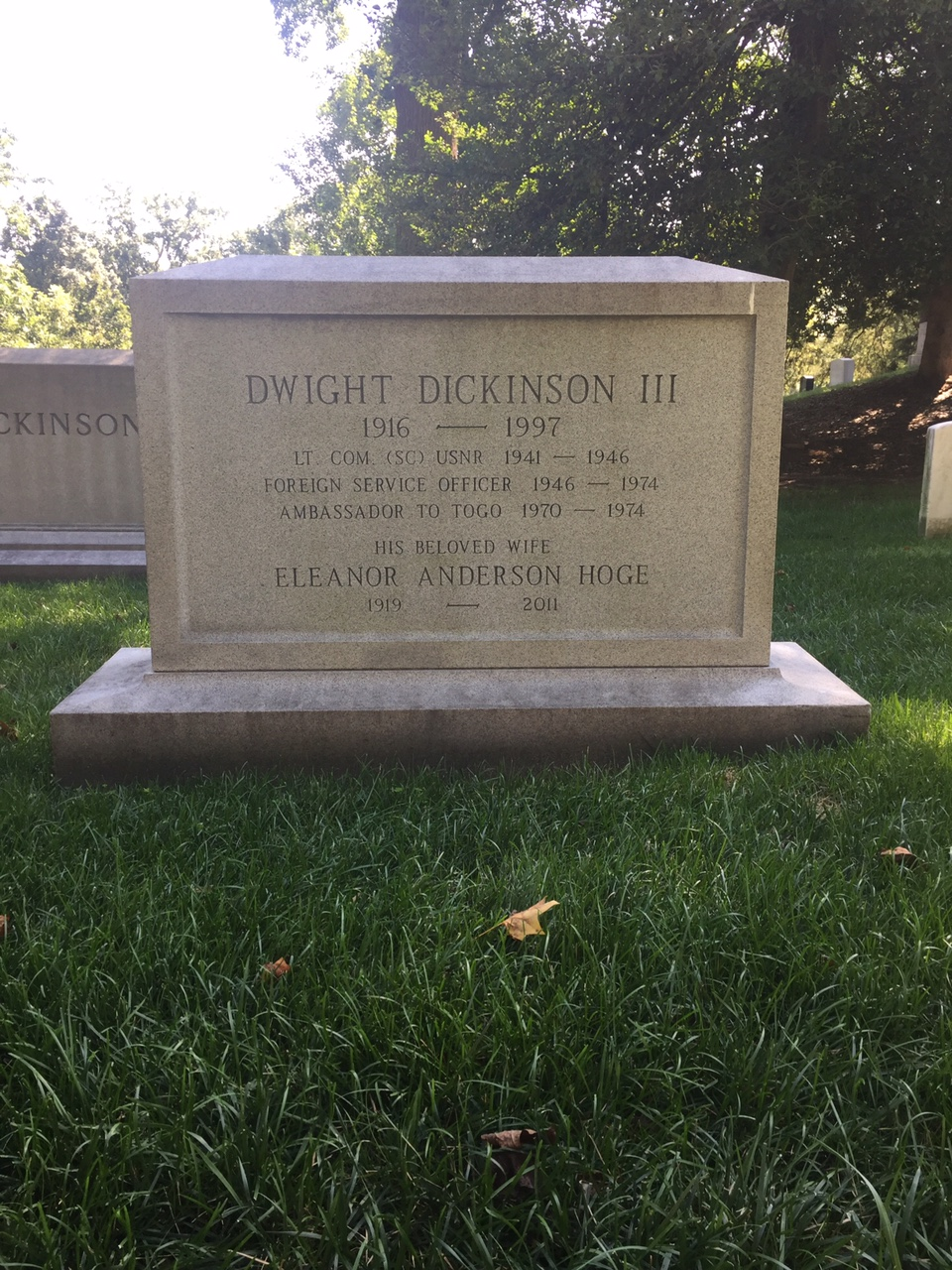
- Grave at Arlington National Cemetery

5th United States Ambassador to Togo
- In office September 8, 1970 – April 3, 1974
- President: Richard Nixon
- Preceded by: Albert W. Sherer, Jr.
- Succeeded by: Nancy V. Rawls

Personal details
- Born: December 13, 1916 Annapolis, Maryland, US
- Died: September 24, 1997 (aged 80) Newport, Rhode Island, US
- Spouse: Eleanor Anderson Hoge
- Children: Spencer Edward II; Philip Lloyd
- Profession: Diplomat

Military service
- Branch/service: United States Navy
- Years of service: 1940–46
- Rank: Lieutenant Commander

Dwight Dickinson III (December 13, 1916 – September 24, 1997) was a United States diplomat and Navy veteran.

== Biography ==
He was born in Annapolis, Maryland. After graduating from Harvard College in 1940 he was commissioned in the United States Navy in 1941, serving throughout World War II at sea in the Atlantic and Pacific skirmishes aboard the Idaho, and later aboard the cruiser, Augusta, when it brought President Truman back from the Potsdam Conference in August 1945. He also had shore duty at Guadalcanal and Annapolis, Maryland.

Dickinson ended his naval career as a Lieutenant Commander in the Supply Corps in 1946 and entered the United States Foreign Service, where he was posted to assignments in Curaçao, Mexico City, Beirut and Paris, as well as two tours in Washington and to the US mission to the United Nations in 1960 and 1962, at which time he was political advisor and alternate US representative to the Unitre Trusteeship Council.

When he became Chargé d'Affaires in Morocco, he later was appointed as the Ambassador to Togo in 1970. He retired from the Foreign Service in 1974. He lived in Jamestown, Rhode Island, until his death in 1997, leaving his wife of 55 years, Eleanor Anderson Hoge, and two sons, Spencer Edward II and Philip Lloyd.

He died in Newport, Rhode Island in 1997 of Parkinson's disease. He is buried in the Arlington National Cemetery.

Diplomatic posts
Preceded by Albert W. Sherer, Jr.	United States Ambassador to Togo; 1970–1974	Succeeded by Nancy V. Rawls
