= Jessica Davis Ba =

American diplomat

United States Ambassador to Ivory Coast
- In office March 2, 2023 – January 16, 2026
- President: Joe Biden; Donald Trump
- Preceded by: Richard K. Bell

Personal details
- Education: University of Pennsylvania (BA, MA)

Jessica Davis Ba is an American diplomat who had served as the United States ambassador to Ivory Coast. She previously served as Senior Coordinator and Special Advisor for Africa in the Office of the Vice President. Davis Ba previously served as the Chargé d’Affaires, ad interim at the U.S. Embassy in N’Djamena, Chad.

== Early life and education ==
Davis Ba earned Bachelor of Arts in International Relations and Environmental Studies and a Master of Arts in Communication from the University of Pennsylvania; she earned her master's at Pennsylvania's Annenberg School for Communication. She completed doctoral research on communication technologies and development in Africa as a National Security Education Program David L. Boren Graduate Fellow and went on to teach in the Communication, Culture and Technology Program at Georgetown University before joining the Foreign Service.

== Career ==
Davis Ba is a career member of the Senior Foreign Service, with the rank of counselor. Davis Ba was also the deputy chief of mission at the U.S. Mission to the African Union and U.S. deputy permanent representative to the United Nations Economic Commission for Africa in Addis Ababa, Ethiopia. She served as deputy program director at the U.S. embassy in Riyadh, Saudi Arabia, as special assistant in the State Department Operations Center, and as deputy director, international narcotics and law enforcement at the U.S. embassy in Baghdad. Other assignments include serving as deputy counselor for economic affairs and regional labor officer at the U.S. embassy in Nairobi, Kenya and as political/economic officer for the Somalia affairs unit in the U.S. embassy in Nairobi. Davis Ba also served as the deputy director of the International Narcotics and Law Enforcement section in Iraq.

=== U.S. ambassador to Ivory Coast ===
On June 8, 2022, President Joe Biden nominated Davis Ba to be the next ambassador to Côte d'Ivoire. On August 3, 2022, a hearing on her nomination was held before the Senate Foreign Relations Committee. The committee favorably reported the nomination to the Senate floor on December 7, 2022. On December 15, 2022, her nomination was confirmed in the Senate by voice vote. Davis Ba presented her credentials to President Alassane Ouattara on March 2, 2023.

== Personal life ==
Davis Ba speaks French and Spanish. Davis Ba is married to Amadou Mahtar Ba.

Diplomatic posts
| Preceded by Richard K. Bell | United States Ambassador to Ivory Coast; 2023–2026 | Vacant |
