= Victor D. Comras =

American diplomat and lawyer

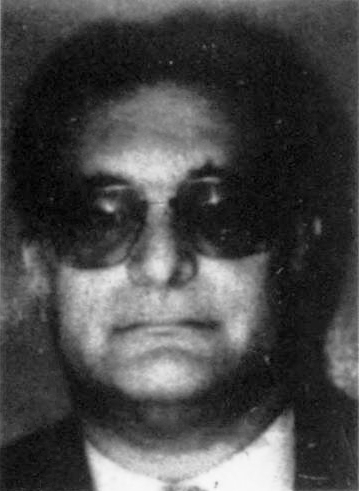

United States Ambassador to Macedonia
- In office 1994–1996
- President: Bill Clinton
- Succeeded by: Christopher R. Hill

Personal details
- Born: Victor D. Comras; 1943 (age 82–83) New York, United States
- Education: Georgetown University (BS); Harvard University (L.L.M.); University of Florida (J.D.)
- Occupation: Lawyer

Victor D. Comras (born 1943) is an American diplomat, lawyer, and writer.

== Biography ==
Comras was born in 1943 in New York. He received a Bachelors of Science from Georgetown University. He acquired a Juris Doctor from the University of Florida in 1966, and he attained a Master of Laws from Harvard University in 1975.

Comras entered the foreign service in 1966. Between 1969 and 1971, he served in the Arms Control and Disarmament Agency. Later on, between 1980 and 1985, he worked in the Bureau of European Affairs before going on to serve as consul general in France. He served as Chargé d'Affaires for the United States to Macedonia from 1994 to 1996. While serving the diplomatic corps, he would specialize in counter-terrorism, money laundering, and sanctions.

After serving for 35 years, Comras retired from the U.S. State Department in 2001. He was then appointed by United Nations Secretary General Kofi Annan to serve as one of five international monitors to oversee Security Council measures implemented against al Qaeda and terrorism financing.

After retiring from diplomacy, Comras began working as a special counsel for the Eren Law Firm.

== Publications ==
- Self Determination and the Partition of States in International Law. 1975. Harvard Law School.
- Al Qaeda Finances and Funding to Affiliated Groups. January 2005. Naval Postgraduate School (U.S.) Center for Contemporary Conflict.
- Flawed Diplomacy: The United Nations and the War on Terrorism. 2010. Potomac Books. ISBN 9781597975858.
- Pressure: Coercive Economic Statecraft and U.S. National Security. 2011. Center for a New American Security.
