= Gillian A. Milovanovic =

American diplomat (born 1949)

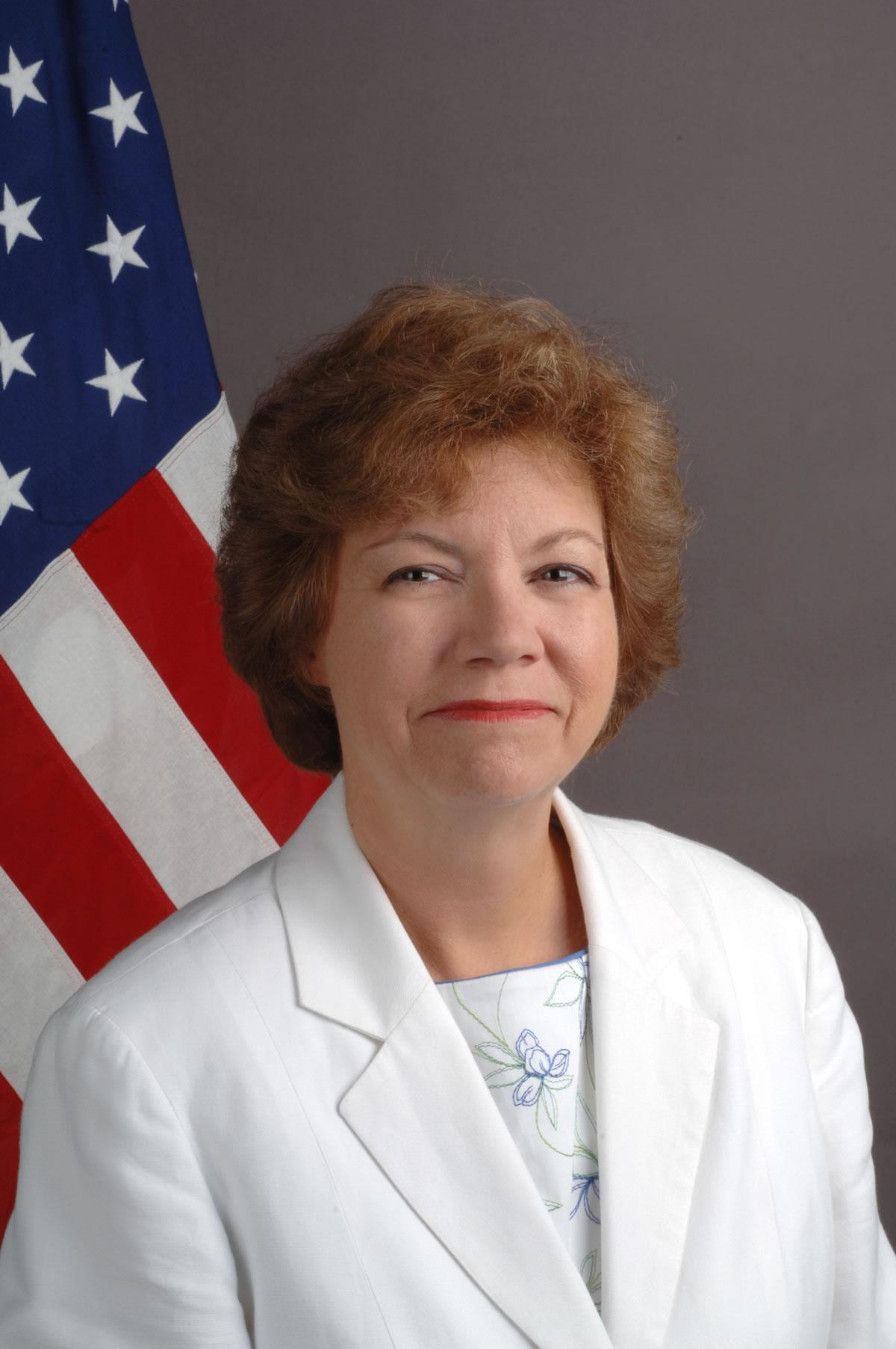

United States Ambassador to Mali
- In office October 31, 2008 – June 1, 2011
- President: George W. Bush; Barack Obama
- Preceded by: Terence McCulley
- Succeeded by: Mary Beth Leonard

4th United States Ambassador to Macedonia
- In office September 6, 2005 – August 30, 2008
- President: George W. Bush
- Preceded by: Lawrence Butler
- Succeeded by: Philip Reeker

Personal details
- Born: Gillian A. Milovanovic; 1949 (age 76–77) New York, United States

Gillian Arlette Milovanovic (born 1949) is an American diplomat who was the United States Ambassador to Macedonia from 2005 to 2007 succeeding Lawrence Butler, and ambassador to Mali from 2007 to 2011. In 2012 Milovanovic was appointed the chair of the Kimberley Process Certification Scheme on behalf of the United States, the first woman to hold that position.

== Early life and education ==
Milovanovic was born in New York, the daughter of the pianist Annette Roussel-Pesche (1914—1997).

Ambassador Milovanovic is a graduate of the University of Pennsylvania, Temple University, and the Ecole Nationale d'Administration.

== Career ==
In 1987, Ms. Milovanovic joined the U.S. Consulate General in Cape Town, South Africa, where she served as Political-Economic Officer and Deputy Consul General. From 1990 to 1994, she was Political-Military Affairs Officer and Deputy Political Counselor at the U.S. Embassy in Brussels. From 1994 to 1997, she served as Deputy Chief of Mission in Gaborone, Botswana. She was Director of the Office of Nordic and Baltic Affairs at the Department of State from 1997 to 1999.

Milovanovic joined the Foreign Service in 1978. Her early assignments included a tour as an International Relations Officer in the U.S. State Department's Bureau of Oceans and International Environmental and Scientific Affairs, Office of Fisheries Affairs. She served as Vice Consul in Sydney, Australia; Staff Assistant to the Assistant Secretary of State for East Asian and Pacific Affairs; and as a Political Officer in Paris following a year of study at the French Ecole Nationale d'Administration.

Ms. Milovanovic served as Deputy Chief of Mission at the U.S. Embassy in Pretoria, South Africa, from August 2002 until July 2005. Before that, she served as Deputy Chief of Mission at the U.S. Embassy in Stockholm, Sweden, from July 1999 to August 2002.

Gillian A. Milovanovic was nominated by the President as U.S. Ambassador to the Republic of Macedonia on June 28, 2005, and confirmed by the United States Senate on July 29, 2005. She was sworn in on August 19, 2005. Ambassador Milovanovic presented her credentials to President Branko Crvenkovski on September 6, 2005.

She is the recipient of two Superior Honor Awards and two Meritorious Honor Awards from the Department of State.
