= List of ambassadors to North Macedonia =

North Macedonia, officially the Republic of North Macedonia, is a country in the Balkan Peninsula in Southeast Europe. It is one of the successor states of the former Yugoslavia, from which it declared independence in September 1991 under the name Republic of Macedonia.

Some ambassadors to North Macedonia are responsible for more than one country, while others are directly accredited to its capital, Skopje.

== Current Ambassadors to North Macedonia ==
Sending country	Presentation of the credentials	Location of resident embassy	Ambassador
Afghanistan	15.03.2007	Sofia, Bulgaria	Zahida Ansary
Albania	05.03.2009	Skopje, North Macedonia	Arben Çejku
Algeria	29.01.2010	Bucharest, Romania	Habib Chawky Hamraoui
Angola	25.03.2005	Belgrade, Serbia	Filipe Felisberto MOonimambu
Argentina	06.12.2010	Sofia, Bulgaria	Guillermo Salvador Azrak
Australia	25.11.2011	Belgrade, Serbia	Helena Gay Studdert
Austria	08.12.2011	Skopje, North Macedonia	Thomas Michael Baier
Azerbaijan	28.09.2011	Ankara, Turkey	Faig Baghirov
Belgium	25.10.2012	Sofia, Bulgaria	Anick Van Calster
Bosnia and Herzegovina	26.06.2012	Skopje, North Macedonia	Zdravko Begovic
Brazil	29.10.2010	Sofia, Bulgaria	Washington Luis Pereira de Sousa Neto
Bulgaria	13.12.2018	Skopje, North Macedonia	Angel Angelov
Burundi		Rome, Italy	Ernest Ndabashinze
Canada	28.09.2011	Belgrade, Serbia	Roman Waschuk
China	06.09.2011	Skopje, North Macedonia	Cui Zhiwei
Croatia		Skopje, North Macedonia	Danijela Barišić
Cuba	29.04.2011	Sofia, Bulgaria	Teresita de Jesus Capote Camacho
Czech Republic	19.09.2012	Skopje, North Macedonia	Miroslav Rameš
Denmark	06.09.2010	Vienna, Austria	Torben Brylle
Ecuador	26.06.2012	Rome, Italy	Carlos Danilo Vallejo Lopez
Egypt	03.09.2009	Sofia, Bulgaria	Olfat Abdel Fattah Ahhmed Farah
Estonia	10.09.2012	Tallinn, Estonia	Arti Hilpus
European Union		Skopje, North Macedonia	Samuel Žbogar
Finland	21.10.2011	Zagreb, Croatia	Juha Ottman
France		Skopje, North Macedonia	Christian Thimonier
Germany		Skopje, North Macedonia	Thomas Gerberich
Ghana		Belgrade, Serbia	Doris Brese (Chargé d’Affaires a.i.)
Greece	21.06.2016	Skopje, North Macedonia	Dimitris Yannakakis
Holy See	12.07.2014	Sofia, Bulgaria	Anselmo Guido Pecorari
Hungary	28.09.2011	Skopje, North Macedonia	Jozsef Bencze
Iceland	27.08.2010	Vienna, Austria	Stefán Skjaldarson
India	29.01.2010	Sofia, Bulgaria	Divyabh Manchanda
Indonesia	25.03.2011	Budapest, Hungary	Maruli Tua Sagala
Iran		Skopje, North Macedonia	Abdolmajid Mozafari (Chargé d’Affaires a.i.)
Ireland	26.06.2012	Bratislava, Slovakia	Oliver Grogan
Israel	10.09.2012	Zagreb, Croatia	Josef Amrani
Italy	06.12.2010	Skopje, North Macedonia	Fabio Cristiani
Japan	30.05.2017	Skopje, North Macedonia	Keiko Haneda
Jordan		Ankara, Turkey	Marouf Bakhit (Ambassador Agréé)
Kazakhstan	20.03.2008	Budapest, Hungary	Rashid Ibrayev
Kosovo		Skopje, North Macedonia	Skender Durmishi (Chargé d’Affaires a.i.)
Kuwait	22.03.2005	Ankara, Turkey	Abdullah Abdulaziz Al-Duwaikh
Kyrgyzstan	14.12.2004	Ankara, Turkey	Amanbek Karypkulov
Laos	25.11.2011	Vienna, Austria	Khamkheuang Bounteum
Latvia	08.12.2005	Stockholm, Sweden	Maija Manika
Lesotho	17.12.2007	Rome, Italy	Jonas Sponkie Malewa
Lithuania	17.06.2011	Budapest, Hungary	Renatas Juška
Malaysia	25.03.2008	Budapest, Hungary	Dato' Kamilan Makson
Malawi	30.03.2012	Berlin, Germany	Isaac Chikwekwere Lamba
Mexico	05.11.2009	Sofia, Bulgaria	Mercedes Felicitas Ruiz Zapata
Moldova	25.03.2011	Sofia, Bulgaria	Alexandru Prigorschi
Montenegro	29.04.2010	Skopje, North Macedonia	Duśan Mrdović
Morocco	05.03.2009	Sofia, Bulgaria	Aziza Limame
Netherlands	06.09.2019	Skopje, North Macedonia	Dirk Jan Kop
North Korea	25.11.2011	Sofia, Bulgaria	Ju Wang Hwan
Norway	30.11.2012	Skopje, North Macedonia	Nils Ragnar Kamsvag
Pakistan	27.10.2011	Ankara, Turkey	Muhammad Haroon Shaukat
Peru	25.10.2012	Bucharest, Romania	Jose Antonio Arrospide del Busto
Poland	08.11.2011	Skopje, North Macedonia	Przemysław Czyż
Portugal	09.06.2009	Belgrade, Serbia	Luis de Almeida Sampaio
Qatar	27.11.2012	Rome, Italy	Mohammed Rashid H. Subah (Chargé d'affaires)
Romania	04.11.2011	Skopje, North Macedonia	Iustinian Focsa
Russia	18.09.2018	Skopje, North Macedonia	Sergey Bazdnikin
Saudi Arabia	05.12.2008	Tirana, Albania	Abdullah Abdulaziz Al Abdulkarim
Serbia	29.01.2010	Skopje, North Macedonia	Tomislav Djurin
Slovakia	15.12.2008	Skopje, North Macedonia	Róbert Kirnág
Slovenia	19.09.2012	Skopje, North Macedonia	Branko Rakoveć
Sovereign Military Order of Malta	07.12.2010	Warsaw, Poland	Paweł Gieryński
Spain	28.01.2011	Skopje, North Macedonia	Fernando de Galainena Rodriguez
Sri Lanka	21.10.2011	Vienna, Austria	Aliyar Lebbe Abdul Azeez
Sweden	01.10.2010	Skopje, North Macedonia	Lars Wahlund
Switzerland	07.12.2010	Skopje, North Macedonia	Stefano Lazzarotto
Syria	01.07.2005	Paris, France	Abdul Majid Rifai (Chargé d'affaires a.i.)
Turkey	27.08.2010	Skopje, North Macedonia	Gürol Sökmensüer
Ukraine	06.08.2009	Skopje, North Macedonia	Yurii Honcharuk
United Kingdom	13.04 2022	Skopje, North Macedonia	Matthew Lawson
United States	12.02.2015	Skopje, North Macedonia	Angela P. Aggeler
Vietnam	30.11.2012	Sofia, Bulgaria	Le Duc Luu
Zambia	30.06.2009	Berlin, Germany	vacant
Zimbabwe	07.04.2011	Berlin, Germany	Hebson Hazvina Mudadirwa Makuvise

== See also ==
- Foreign relations of North Macedonia
- List of diplomatic missions of North Macedonia
- List of diplomatic missions in North Macedonia
