= Dennis Kux =

American diplomat

Dennis H. Kux (born August 11, 1931, in London, England) is a diplomat and former United States Ambassador to Côte d'Ivoire (1986–89). He is the author of India and the United States: Estranged Democracies 1941-1991 (the book has an introduction by Daniel Moynihan) and The United States and Pakistan, 1947-2000: Disenchanted Allies. He is a member of the American Academy of Diplomacy and Council on Foreign Relations. Kux served in the US embassy in Karachi in Pakistan from 1957 to 1959, followed by a tour in India. He again served in Pakistan from 1969 to 1971.

Diplomatic posts
Preceded by Robert Hopkins Miller	United States Ambassador to Côte d'Ivoire; 1986–1989	Succeeded by Kenneth L. Brown
