= Jess L. Baily =

American diplomat

Ambassador Jess L. Baily
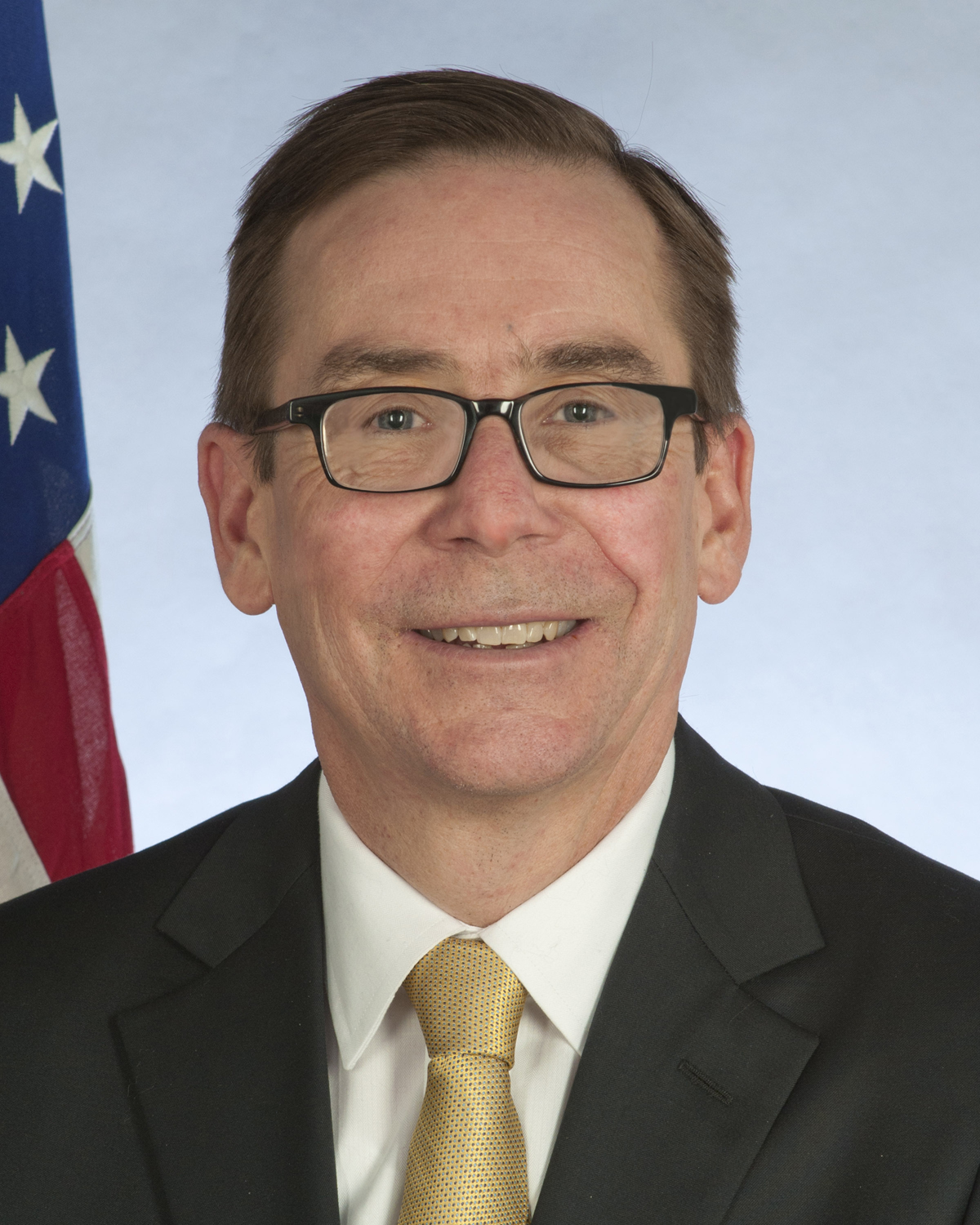

United States Ambassador to Macedonia
- In office February 12, 2015 – March 1, 2019
- President: Barack Obama; Donald Trump
- Preceded by: Paul D. Wohlers
- Succeeded by: Kate Marie Byrnes

United States Ambassador to Turkey
- In office July 9, 2014 – September 8, 2014
- President: Barack Obama
- Preceded by: Francis J. Ricciardone Jr.
- Succeeded by: John R. Bass

Personal details
- Born: Jess L. Baily; 1960 (age 65–66) Cincinnati, Ohio, U.S.
- Children: 1
- Education: Yale University (BA); Columbia University (MA)

Jess Lippencott Baily, alternatively spelled as Lippincott, (born 1960) is an American diplomat.

== Biography ==
Baily was born in Cincinnati, Ohio in 1960. He received a Bachelor's of Arts in History and French Literature from Yale University in 1982, and later attained a Master of Arts in European History from Columbia University in 1985.

Baily began working in the Foreign Service in 1985. His early positions saw him working across Africa and Eurasia, including the states of Turkey, Bangladesh, Senegal, and Thailand. From 2005 to 2007, he directed the State Department's foreign press center; from 2007 to 2008, he served in Erbil as the senior representative in Kurdistan; and from 2011 to 2014, he was the deputy chief of mission at the United States' embassy in Ankara. During this last appointment, he would be made acting Chargé d’Affaires to Turkey between July 2014 and September 2014.

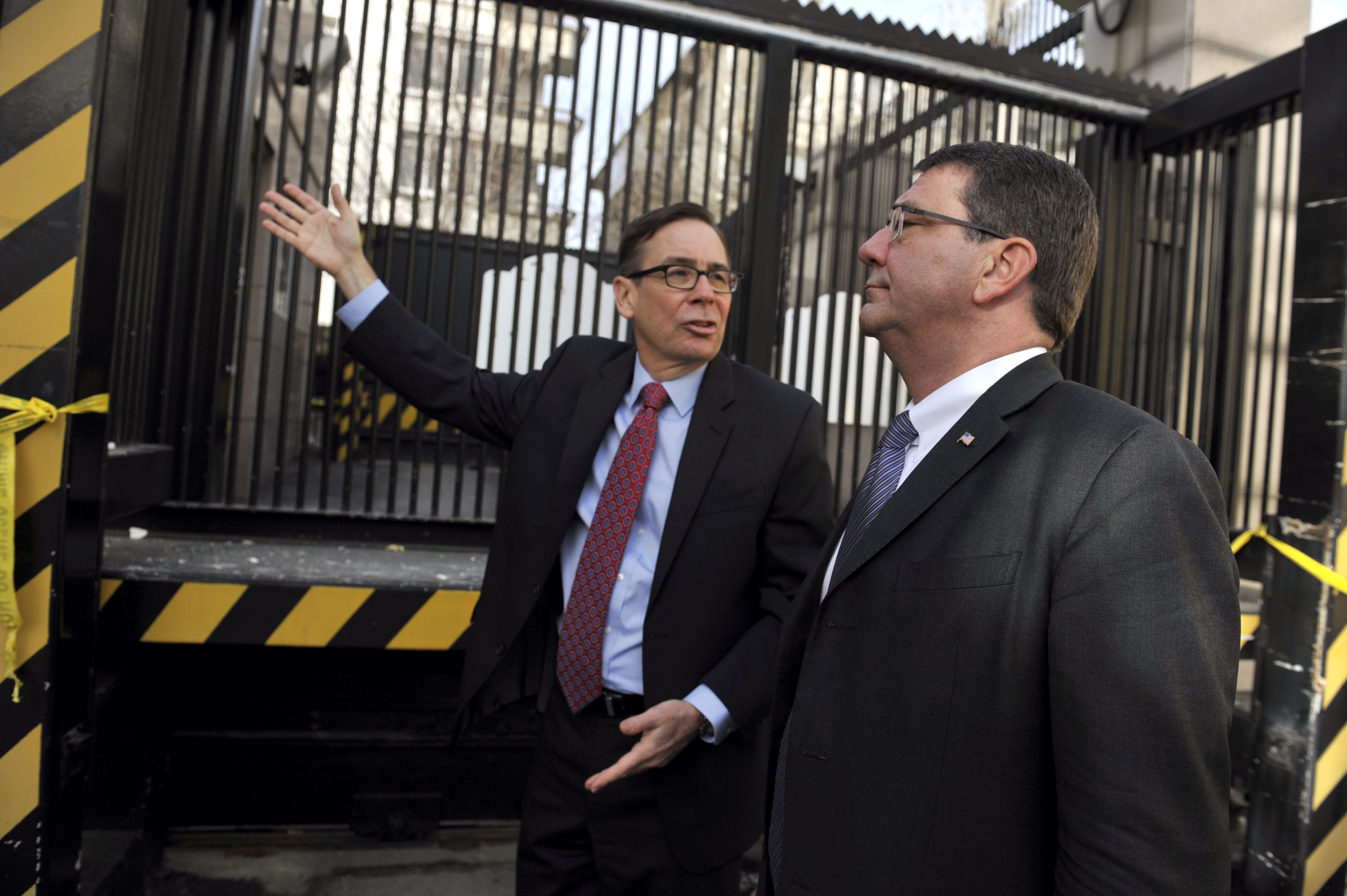
Ashton B. Carter and Jess Baily surveying the damage after the 2013 bombing attack

Eventually Baily would be appointed as the United States' Ambassador to Macedonia on December 23, 2014, a position he would hold until March 1, 2019. In 2017 he would add his voice to other critics of, then president, Gjorge Ivanov for withholding a mandate from opposition leader, Zoran Zaev, over the inclusion of ethnic Albanians in his proposed coalition. That same year he, alongside the USAID, would come under scrutiny by Judicial Watch for funding the Open Society Foundation in what was described as potential interference in domestic political affairs.

== Personal life ==
Baily is married to a former foreign service officer and has one son.

Baily speaks French, Turkish, and Thai.
