= Robert Hopkins Miller =

American diplomat (1927–2017)

6th United States Ambassador to Malaysia
- In office June 8, 1977 – March 8, 1980
- President: Jimmy Carter
- Preceded by: Francis T. Underhill Jr.
- Succeeded by: Barbara M. Watson

9th United States Ambassador to Côte d'Ivoire
- In office November 8, 1983 – August 3, 1986
- President: Ronald Reagan
- Preceded by: Nancy V. Rawls
- Succeeded by: Dennis Kux

Personal details
- Born: September 8, 1927 Port Angeles, Washington, U.S.
- Died: September 11, 2017 (aged 90)
- Relatives: Keith Miller (brother)
- Occupation: Foreign Service officer

Robert Hopkins Miller (September 8, 1927 – September 11, 2017) was a career Foreign Service officer and diplotmat.

Miller was born in Port Angeles, Washington. He studied at Stanford University and Harvard University and joined the foreign service in 1951. He served in Europe, Southeast Asia, and West Africa. His experience in Southeast Asia included service as First Secretary in the American Embassy in Saigon, Vietnam (1962–65); as Director of the Vietnam Working Group, Department of State (1965–67); as Senior Adviser to the American delegation at the Paris peace talks on Vietnam (1968–71); as Deputy Assistant Secretary of State for East Asian and Pacific Affairs with responsibility for Southeast Asia (1974–77); and as the sixth United States Ambassador to Malaysia (1977–80) and to Côte d'Ivoire (1983–86). He is a member of the American Academy of Diplomacy. Miller served as Vice President of the National Defense University from 1986 to 1989. In 1990, he was Diplomat-in-Residence at the George Washington University in Washington, D.C.

Diplomatic posts
Preceded by Francis T. Underhill Jr.	United States Ambassador to Malaysia; 1977–1980	Succeeded by Barbara M. Watson
Preceded by Nancy V. Rawls	United States Ambassador to Côte d'Ivoire; 1983–1986	Succeeded by Dennis Kux
