= Kenneth L. Brown =

American diplomat

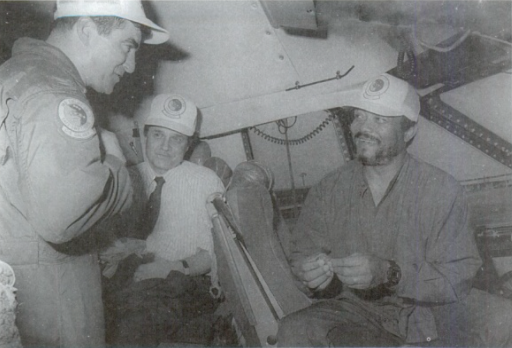
Brown (center) with Ghanaian President Jerry Rawlings (right) in 1995

Kenneth Lee Brown (born December 6, 1936) was an American diplomat who served as the U.S. ambassador to Ghana, Ivory Coast, and Congo-Brazzaville. As a career Foreign Service Officer from 1961 to 1995, he served at the American Embassy in Brussels and six posts in Africa. At the Department of State he held the positions of Deputy Director of UN Political Affairs, Associate Spokesman, Director of Central African Affairs, and Deputy Assistant Secretary of State for Africa.

Brown was nominated as ambassador to the People's Republic of the Congo in November 1981 by President Ronald Reagan. He was later chosen as ambassador to Cote d'Ivoire in August 1989 and as ambassador to Ghana in June 1992, both times by President George H. W. Bush.

In May 2001, he became president of the Association for Diplomatic Studies and Training, an NGO that promotes understanding of American diplomacy, supports training of US foreign affairs personnel, and conducts oral histories of former Foreign Service officers and ambassadors as part of the Foreign Affairs Oral History Collection at the Library of Congress.

After leaving the foreign service, Brown became director of the Dean Rusk Program in International Studies at Davidson College from 1995 to 2001. He has a BA in international relations from Pomona College, an MA in international relations from Yale University, an MA in political science from New York University, and a Ph.D. in political sociology from University of Cape Coast in Ghana.

Diplomatic posts
Preceded by William L. Swing	United States Ambassador to the People's Republic of the Congo; 1981–1984	Succeeded by Alan Wood Lukens
Preceded by Dennis Kux	United States Ambassador to Ivory Coast; 1989–1992	Succeeded by Hume Alexander Horan
Preceded by Raymond Charles Ewing	United States Ambassador to Ghana; 1992–1995	Succeeded by Edward P. Brynn
