= Nancy V. Rawls =

American diplomat

6th United States Ambassador to Togo
- In office February 11, 1974 – August 8, 1976
- President: Gerald Ford
- Preceded by: Dwight Dickinson
- Succeeded by: Ronald D. Palmer

8th United States Ambassador to Côte d'Ivoire
- In office January 16, 1980 – August 16, 1983
- President: Jimmy Carter; Ronald Reagan
- Preceded by: Monteagle Stearns
- Succeeded by: Robert Hopkins Miller

Personal details
- Born: January 24, 1926 Clearwater, Florida, U.S.
- Died: April 13, 1985 (aged 59) Norwalk, Connecticut, U.S.
- Profession: Diplomat

Nancy Vivian Rawls (January 24, 1926 – April 13, 1985) was a former Foreign Service officer, U.S. diplomat, United States Ambassador to Togo (February 11, 1974 – August 8, 1976) and to Côte d'Ivoire, (1979–1983).

Rawls was born on January 24, 1926, in Clearwater, Florida. She received an A.B. from Shorter College in 1947.

She joined the Foreign Service in 1947. She was assigned to instructions in Vienna, Hamburg, and Montreal. After a tour of duty in West Germany, she was assigned to African countries, first to Liberia and then to Kenya. After a year of special studies at the National War College from 1970 to 1971, she became director of the State Department's policy planning staff for the Bureau of African Affairs in 1971. Rawls was one of the first U.S. Foreign Service women to rise to ambassadorial level and was the first woman to serve as ambassador in two African countries.

In 1974, Rawls became Ambassador to Togo. Two years later, she became the United States alternate delegate to the United Nations. She was then appointed as Senior Deputy to the Director General of the Foreign Service. She was then appointed as Ambassador to Côte d'Ivoire in 1979 and retired in 1983.

Rawls died April 13, 1985, at the Norwalk Hospital, Norwalk, Connecticut, after a long illness. She was 59 years old and lived in Westport, Connecticut. Her parents were Eugene and Vivian Rawls, and her brother, Eugene, survives her. He lives in Atlanta.

Diplomatic posts
Preceded by Dwight Dickinson	United States Ambassador to Togo; 1976–1978	Succeeded by Ronald D. Palmer
Preceded by Monteagle Stearns	United States Ambassador to Côte d'Ivoire; 1980–1983	Succeeded by Robert Hopkins Miller
