= Ri Kun =

North Korean diplomat and politician

- Hangul: 리근
- RR: Ri Geun
- MR: Ri Kŭn

Ri Kun (리근; Korean pronunciation: [ɾi.ɡɯn] or [ɾi] [kɯn];) is the Director General of the North American Affairs Bureau of the Foreign Ministry of North Korea. He also serves as North Korea's deputy nuclear negotiator to the Six-Party Talks. His visit to the United States in October 2009, following North Korea's declared desire to return to direct negotiations with the U.S., prompted worldwide media attention. From 2015 he is North Korean Ambassador to Poland.
