= Philip T. Reeker =

American diplomat (born 1965)

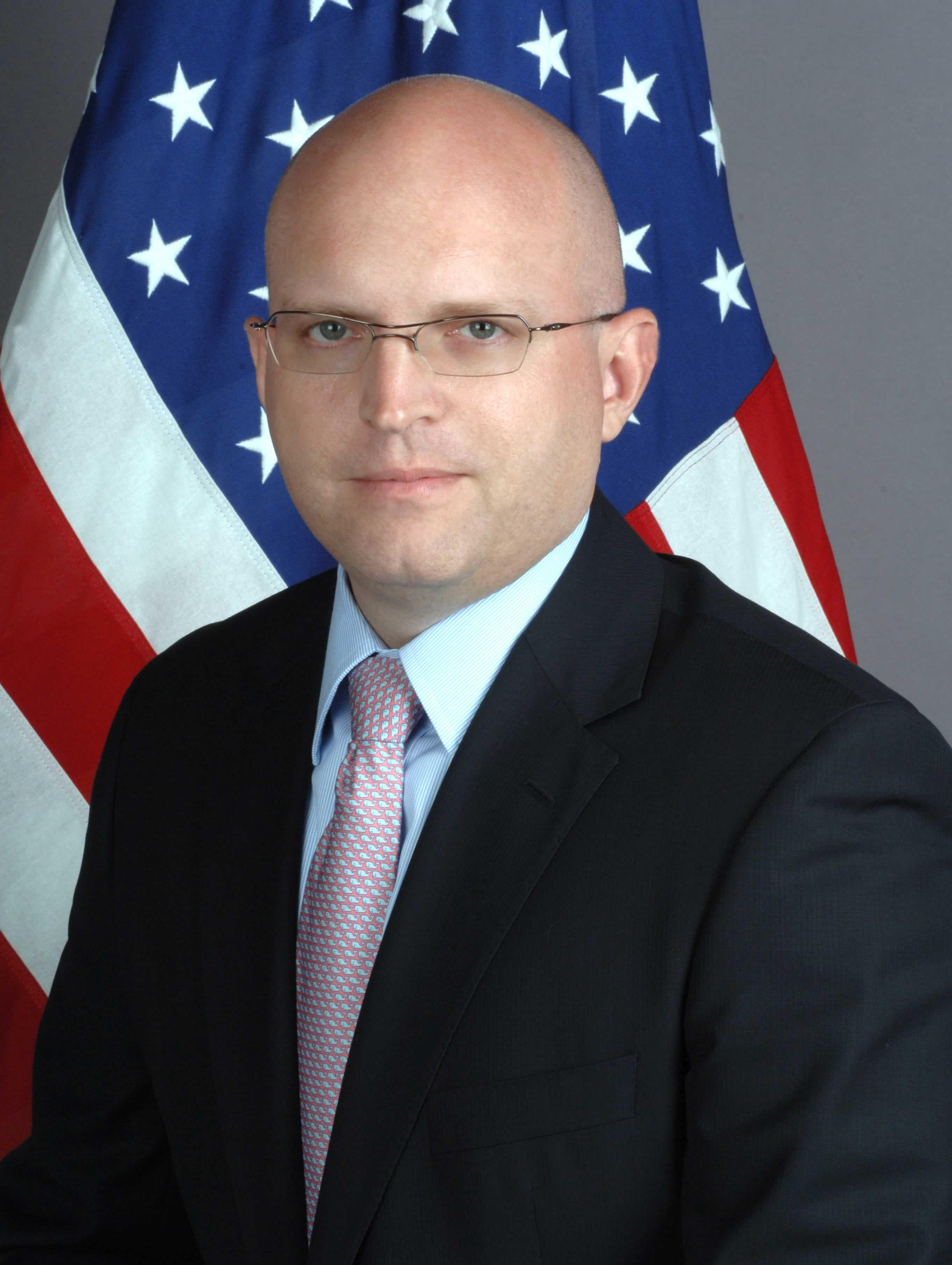
- Reeker in 2008

U.S. Chargé d'Affaires to the United Kingdom
- In office August 1, 2021 – July 19, 2022
- President: Joe Biden
- Preceded by: Yael Lempert
- Succeeded by: Jane Hartley

Assistant Secretary of State for European and Eurasian Affairs
- Acting
- In office March 18, 2019 – July 31, 2021
- President: Donald Trump; Joe Biden
- Preceded by: A. Wess Mitchell
- Succeeded by: Maureen Cormack

5th United States Ambassador to North Macedonia
- In office September 29, 2008 – July 15, 2011
- President: George W. Bush; Barack Obama
- Preceded by: Gillian Milovanovic
- Succeeded by: Paul D. Wohlers

Personal details
- Born: January 19, 1965 (age 61) Pennsylvania, U.S.
- Education: Yale University (BA); Thunderbird School of Global Management (MBA)

Philip Thomas Reeker (born January 19, 1965) is an American diplomat and career foreign service officer with the Department of State who currently serves as the senior advisor for Caucasus negotiations. He was previously Chargé d'affaires of the United States mission to the United Kingdom from 2021 to 2022 and acting assistant secretary of state in the Bureau of European and Eurasian Affairs from 2019 to 2021.

Reeker was the civilian deputy and policy advisor (POLAD) to the commander of U.S. European Command in Stuttgart, Germany from 2017 to 2019, U.S. Consul General in Milan, Italy from 2014 to 2017, deputy assistant secretary of state in the Bureau of European and Eurasian Affairs from 2011 through 2013, and the U.S. ambassador to Macedonia from 2008 to 2011.

== Early life, education, and family ==
Born in Pennsylvania, Reeker grew up in multiple parts of the United States as well as in Australia. He received a BA from Yale University in 1986, and an MBA from the Thunderbird School of Global Management (now part of Arizona State University in Phoenix) in 1991. He is married to Solveig Johnson Reeker, who also is a member of the Foreign Service.

== Career ==
A career foreign service officer, Reeker served as Assistant Information Officer in Budapest, Hungary from 1993 to 1996 and as the Public Affairs Officer in Skopje, Macedonia from 1997 to 1999. He was Director of Press Relations at the State Department from 1999 to 2000. Reeker was Deputy Spokesman and Deputy Assistant Secretary in the Bureau of Public Affairs from 2000 to 2003. He was recipient of the Edward R. Murrow Award for Excellence in Public Diplomacy in 2003, and traveled domestically and internationally as the Spokesman at Large for the State Department, giving talks and interviews on U.S. foreign policy and diplomacy from 2003 to 2004. He was spokesman for Ambassador Christopher R. Hill and for the Rambouillet Process (Kosovo peace talks). From June 2007 until June 2008, Reeker served at the U.S. Embassy in Iraq as the Counselor to the Ambassador for Public Affairs. He was the Deputy Chief of Mission in Budapest, Hungary from 2004 to 2007 and arrived in Baghdad June 7, 2007 to serve as the Counselor to the Ambassador for Public Affairs.

Reeker was nominated by President George W. Bush to become U.S. Ambassador to Macedonia. He was confirmed by the Senate at served in this role from 2008 to 2011. Thereafter Reeker served as Deputy Assistant Secretary of State for European and Eurasian Affairs focused on the Balkans, Central Europe, and Holocaust Issues from 2011 until 2013. On September 5, 2014 he became the U.S. Consul General in Milan, Italy. In November 2017 Reeker assumed responsibilities as the USEUCOM Civilian Deputy and POLAD.

He became acting Assistant Secretary for European and Eurasian Affairs in March 2019, where he oversaw a portfolio of 50 countries. In that role he quickly became concerned about the Ambassador to Ukraine, Marie Yovanovitch, who appeared to be the subject of an unfounded smear campaign. In an email to Ulrich Brechbuhl, the State Department counselor and confidant of Secretary of State Mike Pompeo, Reeker described the smear as a "fake narrative" that was "really ... without merit or validation" and on other occasions forwarded to Brechbuhl information State Department officials gathered to counter the allegations. President Donald Trump nevertheless removed her prematurely from her post and referred to her as "bad news" in a conversation with the Ukrainian president.

On Saturday, October 26, 2019 Reeker testified behind closed doors before several House Committees of US Congress in the impeachment inquiry against Donald Trump and the Trump-Ukraine scandal. Investigators questioned the "high-ranking State Department official" regarding his knowledge of an apparent "shadow" foreign policy undertaking designed to pressure Ukraine for President Trump's personal political benefit. Reeker testified that he did not know about a quid pro quo, or the Trump administration's alleged efforts to pressure Ukraine to initiate or launch an investigation into Joe and Hunter Biden until the public announcement of the whistleblower complaint. However, Reeker said he was involved with the effort to put out an internal statement in support of former Ambassador to Ukraine Marie Yovanovitch, who was ousted based on allegedly false allegations.

On July 15, 2021, Reeker was announced as the U.S. Chargé d'Affaires to the United Kingdom, as of August 1, 2021. As acting United States ambassador to the United Kingdom, Reeker attended a September 11 anniversary event in Windsor Castle in 2021.

On August 24, 2022, Secretary of State Antony Blinken appointed Reeker as senior advisor for Caucasus negotiations. In this capacity, he serves as U.S. OSCE Minsk Group co-chair and lead negotiator for the U.S. delegation to the Geneva International Discussions.

== Honors and awards ==
In 2013 Reeker was awarded both the Robert C. Frasure Memorial Award for “his commitment to peace and the alleviation of human suffering caused by war or civil injustice” in the Balkans and the National Albanian American Council's “Hands of Hope Award.” He received the Edward R. Murrow Award for Excellence in Public Diplomacy in 2003, and several State Department Superior Honor Awards.

== See also ==
- Impeachment inquiry against Donald Trump
- Trump–Ukraine scandal

Diplomatic posts
Preceded by Gillian Milovanovic	United States Ambassador to Macedonia; 2008–2011	Succeeded by Paul D. Wohlers
