= Angela P. Aggeler =

American diplomat

Angela Aggeler
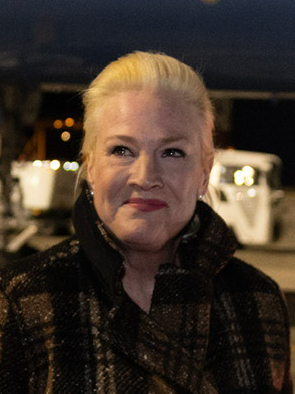

United States Ambassador to North Macedonia
- In office November 8, 2022 – January 22, 2026
- President: Joe Biden; Donald Trump
- Preceded by: Kate Marie Byrnes

Personal details
- Education: University of Utah
- Angela P. Aggeler's voice Aggeler's opening statement at her confirmation hearing to be United States ambassador to North Macedonia; Recorded July 28, 2022

Angela Price Aggeler is an American diplomat who had served the United States ambassador to North Macedonia.

== Early life and education ==
Aggeler is a graduate of the University of Utah.

== Career ==
Aggeler is a career member of the Senior Foreign Service, with the rank of Minister-Counselor. She served as the Deputy Chief of Mission at the U.S. Embassy in Islamabad, Pakistan, previously serving as Chargé d'Affaires ad interim there. Aggeler formerly served as Minister Counselor for Public Affairs at the U.S. Embassy in Paris, France; Acting Principal Deputy Assistant Secretary of State for the Bureau of South and Central Asian Affairs and the Office of the Special Representative for Afghanistan and Pakistan in Washington, D.C., and Deputy Assistant Secretary of State for Press and Public Diplomacy in the Bureau of Press and Public Diplomacy. Before that, she was Counselor for Public Affairs at the U.S. Embassy in Islamabad, Pakistan. Previous assignments include Public Affairs Officer at the American Embassy in Skopje, North Macedonia; Cultural and Press Attaché of the U.S. Embassy in Hanoi, Vietnam; Spokesperson for the Bureau of Consular Affairs at the State Department; and assignments at the U.S. Embassy in Paris, France and U.S. Embassy in New Delhi, India. Prior to joining the Foreign Service, Aggeler worked for the State Department at U.S. Embassies in Ouagadougou, Burkina Faso and Budapest, Hungary, as well as the Consulate General in Madras, India. Earlier in her career, she worked at the National Gallery of Art in Washington, D.C., and as a Peace Corps Volunteer in the Central African Republic.

=== Ambassador to North Macedonia ===
On May 25, 2022, President Joe Biden nominated Aggeler to be the next U.S Ambassador to North Macedonia. Hearings on her nomination were held before the Senate Foreign Relations Committee on July 28, 2022. Her nomination was favorably reported by the committee on August 3, 2022. Aggeler was confirmed by the full Senate on August 4, 2022, via voice vote. She presented her credentials to President Stevo Pendarovski on November 8, 2022.

== Awards and recognitions ==
Aggeler has won numerous State Department awards, including the Assistant Secretary's Award for Excellence in 2006 and the Mildred Sinclaire Award for Language (in Hindi, 2000).

== Languages ==
Aggeler speaks French, Macedonian, and some Hindi.

Diplomatic posts
| Preceded by Kate Marie Byrnes | United States Ambassador to North Macedonia; 2022–2026 | Vacant |
