= Robert Solwin Smith =

American diplomat

Robert Solwin Smith (1924 New York City – May 22, 2013 McLean, Virginia) was a non-career appointee who served as the Deputy Assistant Secretary for African Affairs between 1969 and 1974, American Ambassador Extraordinary and Plenipotentiary to the Ivory Coast from 1974 to 1976, and vice president of the Overseas Private Investment Corporation.

He left Yale University to serve in the Navy during World War II. Smith returned to Yale, graduating in 1947. He received a master's degree in 1949 and a doctorate in 1956, both in government, at Harvard University.

Smith died at his home due to complications from melanoma.
