= Andrew Haviland =

American diplomat

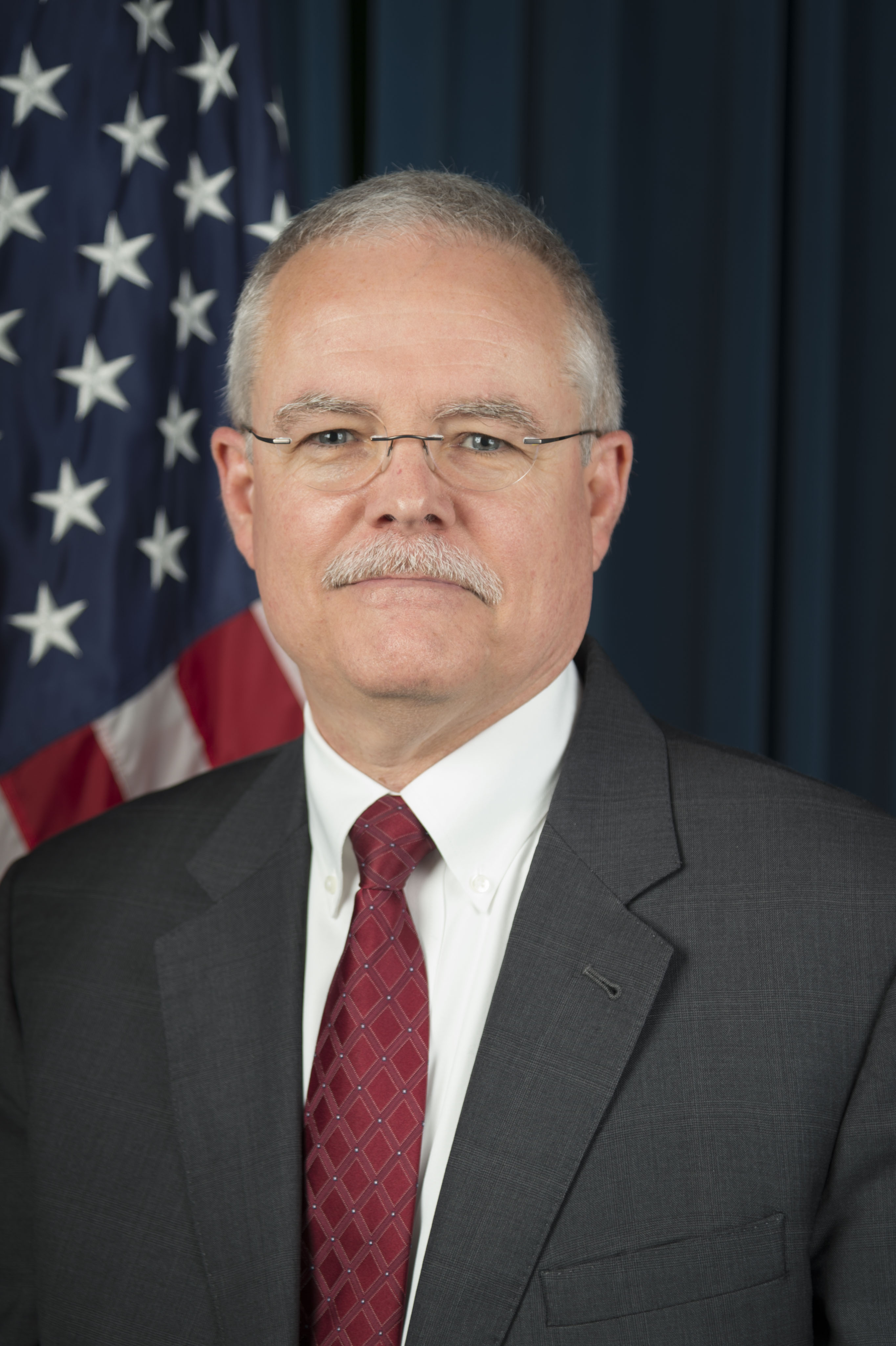
Andrew Haviland

Andrew Haviland, a senior Foreign Service officer with the rank of Minister-Counselor, has been serving as Chargé d'Affaires for the U.S. Mission to the Organization for Economic Co-operation and Development (OECD) since October 2017.

== Career ==
Young served as Deputy Chief of Mission (Aug 2014 to Aug 2016) and as Chargé d'Affaires (Aug 2016 to Aug 2017) at the U.S. Embassy in Abidjan. While directing an economic team in the State Department's Office of Monetary Affairs, Haviland also served as head of the U.S. delegation to the Paris Club which negotiates sovereign debt relief.

== Education ==
- Master's Degree in Economic Development from the School of International and Public Affairs, Columbia University and another in International Finance from Harvard University’s Kennedy School of Government
