= M. Michael Einik =

American diplomat

M. Michael Einik (born 1949, New York State) is a member of the Board of Directors of the Bulgarian American Business Center and former American ambassador to what is now North Macedonia (1999-2002). He was also Deputy Chief of Mission/Charge d’Affaire at the American Embassy in Bucharest, Romania (1995-1999), and Consul General at the American Consulate in Zagreb, Croatia. He is CEO of Underwater Optical Technologies in Riga, Latvia.

Einik has an MBA in International Business from George Washington University (1972) and a BBA in Economics from the University of Miami (1971).
