= List of ambassadors of the United States to Eritrea =

Ambassador of the United States to Eritrea
- Seal of the United States Department of State

- Flag of a United States ambassador

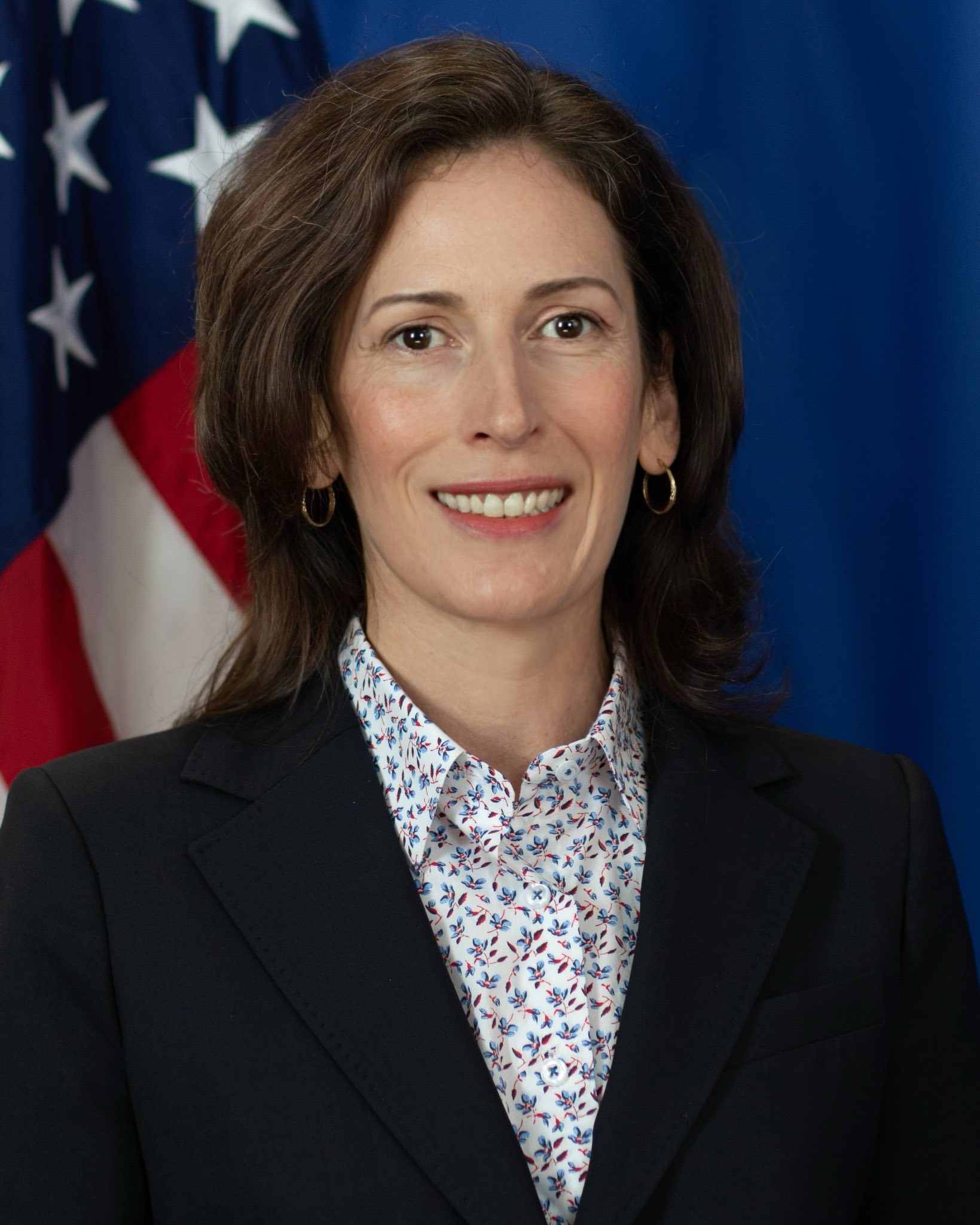
- Incumbent; Christine E. Meyer as Chargé d'Affaires ad interim since July 29, 2025
- Nominator: The president of the United States
- Appointer: The president with Senate advice and consent
- Inaugural holder: Joseph P. O'Neill as Chargé d'Affaires ad interim
- Formation: June 11, 1991
- Website: U.S. Embassy - Asmara

The following is a list of United States ambassadors to Eritrea. The United States recognized Eritrea's independence April 27, 1991, and established diplomatic relations on June 11, 1991. The Consulate in Asmara then became an Embassy with Joseph P. O'Neill as Chargé d'Affaires ad interim. The U.S. embassy in Eritrea has been represented by a Chargé d'Affaires since 2010.

== Ambassadors ==
Name	Title	Appointed	Presented credentials	Terminated mission	Notes
Robert Gordon Houdek - Career FSO	Ambassador Extraordinary and Plenipotentiary	November 22, 1993	December 31, 1993	Left post, September 10, 1996	
John F. Hicks - Career FSO	Ambassador Extraordinary and Plenipotentiary	July 2, 1996	September 29, 1996	Left post, May 11, 1997	
William Davis Clarke - Career FSO	Ambassador Extraordinary and Plenipotentiary	June 29, 1998	August 20, 1998	August 12, 2001	
Donald J. McConnell - Career FSO	Ambassador Extraordinary and Plenipotentiary	July 16, 2001	October 3, 2001	Left post, July 16, 2004	
Scott H. DeLisi - Career FSO	Ambassador Extraordinary and Plenipotentiary	May 12, 2004	October 21, 2004	Left post, June 2, 2007	
Ronald K. McMullen - Career FSO	Ambassador Extraordinary and Plenipotentiary	October 29, 2007	N/A	July 19, 2010	
Joel Reifman - Career FSO	Chargé d'Affaires ad interim	July 19, 2010	N/A	February 2012	
Sue Bremner - Career FSO	Chargé d'Affaires ad interim	July 2012	N/A	April 2014	
Louis Mazel - Career FSO	Chargé d'Affaires	July 2014	N/A	July 27, 2016	
Natalie E. Brown - Career FSO	Chargé d'Affaires	September 23, 2016	N/A	November 25, 2019	
Steven C. Walker - Career FSO	Chargé d'Affaires	December 12, 2019	N/A	July 17, 2022	
Leslie Freriksen - Career FSO	Chargé d'Affaires	July 18, 2022	N/A	July 28, 2025	
Christine E. Meyer - Career FSO	Chargé d'Affaires	July 29, 2025	N/A	Incumbent	

== See also ==
- Eritrea – United States relations
- Foreign relations of Eritrea
- Ambassadors of the United States
