= Gayleatha B. Brown =

American diplomat (1947–2013)

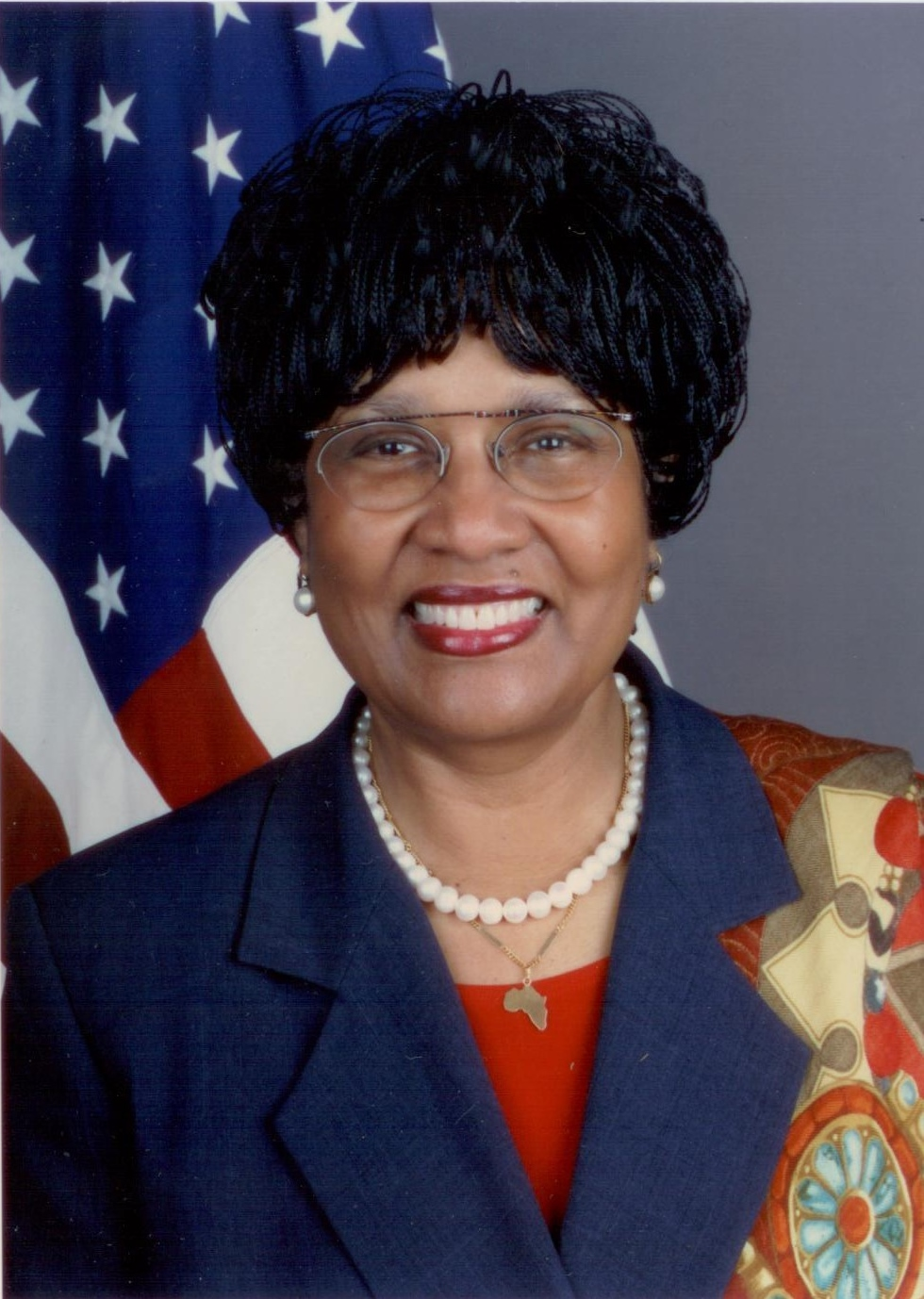

United States Ambassador to Benin
- In office September 8, 2006 – August 22, 2009
- President: George W. Bush
- Preceded by: Wayne E. Neill
- Succeeded by: James Knight

United States Ambassador to Burkina Faso
- In office did not assume post
- President: Barack Obama
- Preceded by: Jeanine E. Jackson
- Succeeded by: J. Thomas Dougherty

Personal details
- Born: June 20, 1947 Matewan, West Virginia, U.S.
- Died: April 19, 2013 (aged 65) Edison, New Jersey, U.S.
- Occupation: Ambassador

Gayleatha Beatrice Brown (June 20, 1947 – April 19, 2013) was a United States foreign service officer and ambassador. She served in several diplomatic posts during her career with the U.S. Department of State including U.S. ambassador to Benin.

== Education ==
Brown was educated at the Red Jacket Elementary School, Matewan Elementary and High Schools in Mingo County, West Virginia. She was senior class president and graduated from Edison High School in Edison, New Jersey. She has BA and MA honor degrees from Howard University. She conducted post-graduate work in international relations at the School of Advanced International Studies (SAIS) at Johns Hopkins University.

== Career ==
Before joining the Department of State, Ambassador Brown was a Special Assistant to the Agency for International Development (USAID) Assistant Administrator for Africa and a legislative assistant in the House of Representatives of the U.S. Congress.

Brown's postings with the Department of State included:

- Ambassador to Benin
- Counselor for Political Affairs at the U.S. Embassy in Pretoria, South Africa
- U.S. Consul General at the American Consulate General and concurrently as the U.S. Deputy Permanent Observer to the Council of Europe in Strasbourg, France
- Chief of the Economic and Commercial Sections at the U.S. Embassies in Harare, Zimbabwe; and Dar es Salaam, Tanzania
- Desk Officer for Canada, Senegal, Guinea, and Mauritania at the State Department in Washington
- Economic Officer/Regional United States Agency for International Development (USAID) Representative and Finance and Development Officer at the U.S. Embassies in Paris and Abidjan
- Representative of the State Department Organization for Economic Cooperation and Development (OECD) Export Credit Arrangement negotiations

President Obama nominated Brown for the ambassadorial post to Burkina Faso on July 2, 2009, and she was confirmed by the Senate on August 4. However, she never officially assumed this post.

== Honors ==
- Lady of the Golden Horseshoe (West Virginia state academic honor)
- Among the first women Rotarians in Tanzania
- Charter member of the New Jersey Edison Township High School Alumni Hall of Fame
- Two Department of State Superior Honor Awards
- State Department Meritorious Honor Award
- Honorary member of the Alpha Kappa Alpha (AKA) Sorority and Sandown Rotary Club in Johannesburg, South Africa

Ambassador Brown spoke English, French and Swahili. She wrote poetry, enjoyed reading (particularly mystery novels), and loved dancing, tennis, tai chi, and music (especially gospel, soul, jazz, classical). She was a member of the Shiloh Baptist Church (Pilgrim Circle) in Washington, D.C. and was associated with the Community Church of Iselin, New Jersey.

== Sources ==
- "Ambassador Gayleatha B. Brown". September 22, 2009. State Department. Archived from the original on 2009-09-22.
- United States Department of State: Biography of Gayleatha Brown
- White House press release
- "Coutonou" (PDF). State Department.

Diplomatic posts
Preceded by Wayne E. Neill	U.S. Ambassador to Benin; 2006–2009	Succeeded by James Knight
Preceded by Jeanine E. Jackson	U.S. Ambassador to Burkina Faso; 2009–2010	Succeeded by J. Thomas Dougherty
