= Sandra Clark (disambiguation) =

Sandra E. Clark is an American diplomat.

Sandra Clark may also refer to:

- Sandra Clark (British actress), Scottish actress who featured in the TV series The Mackinnons (1977) and Me and My Girl (1985–1988)
- Sandra Clark (American actress), American actress known for her role in the film Scream for Help (1984)
- Sandra Clark, a fictional character on the TV series 227
