= Ronald K. McMullen =

American diplomat (born 1955)

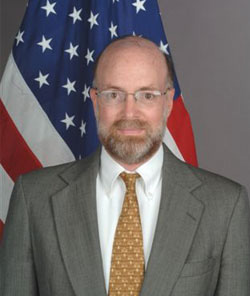

United States Ambassador to Eritrea
- In office October 29, 2007 – July 19, 2010
- President: George W. Bush; Barack Obama
- Preceded by: Scott H. DeLisi
- Succeeded by: Joel Reifman (Chargé d'affaires)

Ronald Keith McMullen (born October 18, 1955) is an American foreign service officer and a career member of the Senior Foreign Service. He served as the U.S. Ambassador to Eritrea from 2007 to 2010.

McMullen was born in Iowa, and received his doctorate from the University of Iowa, where wrote his dissertation on economic consequences of African coups d'état. He received a master's degree from the University of Minnesota and his bachelor's degree from Drake University.

He is a member of the Senior Foreign Service and has over twenty-five years of diplomatic experience. He previously directed the Office of Afghanistan and Pakistan in the Bureau of International Narcotic and Law Enforcement Affairs. Prior to that he served as Associate Dean of the Foreign Service Institute’s School of Leadership and Management.

Mr. McMullen was Deputy Chief of Mission in Rangoon, Burma from 2002 until 2005. In Burma he worked closely with Nobel Peace laureate Aung San Suu Kyi and pro-democracy and ethnic minority groups. As Deputy Chief of Mission and Charge’ d’Affaires in the Fiji Islands from 1999 until 2002, he was instrumental in helping Fiji pull back from the brink of civil conflict after an armed takeover of parliament and subsequent coup d'état.

Other overseas assignments include serving as Deputy Principal Officer in Cape Town, South Africa; Economic Officer in Libreville, Gabon; Political Officer in Colombo, Sri Lanka; and Vice Consul in Santo Domingo, Dominican Republic. From 1990 until 1993 Dr. McMullen served as visiting professor at the U.S. Military Academy at West Point, where he taught six different courses in International Relations and Comparative Politics. Before joining the Foreign Service in 1982, Mr. McMullen served as a State Department intern in Khartoum, Sudan.

His languages include Spanish, French, Afrikaans, and Russian. McMullen has authored a dozen scholarly works and is a three-time recipient of the State Department's Superior Honor Award.

Diplomatic posts
Preceded by Scott H. DeLisi	United States Ambassador to Eritrea; 2007–2010	Succeeded by Joel Reifman
