= List of ambassadors to Burkina Faso =

This is a list of all the current ambassadors to Burkina Faso.

Sending country	Ambassador	Credentialed	Previous	Embassy Website	Notes
Australia	No mission				Australians should contact Canadian mission
Burundi	Édouard Nduwimana	(As of 19 December 2024)			Accredited from Abuja, Nigeria
Canada	Carol McQueen	(As of April 2021)	List		
China	No mission				The PRC and Burkina Faso suspended diplomatic ties on February 4, 1994
France	Luc Hallade	2019 (As of April 2021)			
Germany	Andreas Michael Pfaffernoschke	2020 (As of April 2021)			
Italy	No mission				accredited from Abidjan, Côte d'Ivoire
Netherlands	Ernst Noorman				Embassy office was opened in 2018
Russia	Vladimir Baykov	2016 (As of April 2021)	List		accredited from Abidjan, Côte d'Ivoire
South Africa	No mission				accredited from Abidjan, Côte d'Ivoire
Republic of China	Shen, Cheng-hong				Diplomatic ties were broken in 1973, reestablished in 1994, and broken in May 2018
United Kingdom	Iain Walker	2017 (As of April 2021)			Relations are handled by the high commission in Accra, Ghana
United States of America	Sandra E. Clark	2020 (As of April 2021)	List		
