= Richard T. Davies =

American diplomat

Richard Townsend Davies

United States Ambassador to Poland
- In office January 5, 1973 – February 5, 1978
- President: Richard Nixon; Gerald Ford; Jimmy Carter
- Preceded by: Walter J. Stoessel Jr.
- Succeeded by: William E. Schaufele Jr.

Personal details
- Born: May 28, 1920 Brooklyn, New York
- Died: March 30, 2005 (aged 85) Silver Spring, Maryland
- Children: Glyn, Michael, Stephen and John
- Education: Columbia College

Richard Townsend Davies (May 28, 1920 – March 30, 2005) was an American diplomat who served as the United States Ambassador to Poland from 1973 to 1978.

== Biography ==
Davies was born on March 28, 1920, in Brooklyn and grew up in Plainfield, New Jersey. He graduated from Columbia College in 1942 with a degree in international relations.

After he finished his studies, he fought in World War II and served in the Office of Military Government in Germany.

He joined the Foreign Service in 1947 and served as a consular and political officer at the U.S. Embassy in Warsaw for two years. He also served as the counselor for political affairs at the U.S. Embassy in Moscow during the Cuban Missile Crisis in 1962 and the U.S. Information Agency assistant director for the Soviet Union and Eastern Europe from 1965 to 1968. From 1968 to 1969, he was the consul general of the Consulate General of the United States, Kolkata.

He served as the Deputy Assistant Secretary of State for European affairs from 1970 to 1972 when he was appointed by Richard Nixon as ambassador to the Polish People's Republic, where he served until 1978. During his posting in Poland, he was credited for establishing regular contacts, and forming friendly ties with Cardinal Karol Wojtyla of Kraków, who later became known as Pope John Paul II.

Davies also prepared the visits of Presidents Gerald Ford and Jimmy Carter to Poland as ambassador and helped improve trade relations between the two countries. He made his retirement in 1980 as director of the State Department's human intelligence tasking office in Washington. After his retirement, he maintained an interest in human rights promotion in Eastern Europe and chaired an NGO to support the Polish workers' movement, Solidarity. He was also a frequent writer of op-eds and opposed NATO enlargement.

Davies died on March 30, 2005, in Silver Spring, Maryland. One son, Glyn Townsend Davies, is also a career foreign service officer who served as the United States Ambassador to Thailand from 2015 to 2018 and the 7th United States Ambassador to the United Nations International Organizations in Vienna. Another son, John S. Davies, is an actor. Another son, Stephen, is a journalist. Another son, Michael, died in 2023.
