= List of ambassadors of the United States to Benin =

Ambassador of the United States to Benin
- Ambassadeur des Etats-Unis au Bénin
- Seal of the United States Department of State

- Flag of a United States ambassador

- Incumbent; Skye Justice; Chargé d'affaires since September 16, 2026
- Nominator: The president of the United States
- Appointer: The president; with Senate advice and consent
- Inaugural holder: R. Borden Reams as Ambassador Extraordinary and Plenipotentiary
- Formation: October 14, 1960
- Website: U.S. Embassy - Cotonou

The Kingdom of Dahomey was an overseas possession of France—part of French West Africa—until 1958. In that year Dahomey became an autonomous republic, and gained full independence in 1960. The United States immediately recognized Dahomey and began the process of initiating diplomatic relations. A U.S. Embassy at Abidjan, Côte d'Ivoire (then named Ivory Coast) was established with Donald L. Norland as Chargé d'Affaires ad interim. The embassy was also accredited also to Dahomey, Niger, and Upper Volta (now named Burkina Faso) while resident at Abidjan. On July 31, 1960, Chargé Norland presented his credentials to the government of Dahomey, to take effect on August 1, 1960. On October 14, 1960, R. Borden Reams was appointed as the ambassador and presented his credentials on November 26, 1960.

On February 15, 1961, the Embassy in Cotonou, Dahomey, was established with Converse Hettinger as Chargé d'Affaires ad interim. Ambassador Reams remained resident in Abidjan.

In 1961 Robinson McIlvaine was appointed as Ambassador Extraordinary and Plenipotentiary with a separate commission solely to Dahomey. He presented his credentials to the government of Dahomey on June 22, 1961.

The Republic of Dahomey changed its name to Republic of Benin in 1975.

== Ambassadors ==
Name	Title	Appointed	Presented credentials	Terminated mission	Notes
R. Borden Reams – Career FSO	Ambassador Extraordinary and Plenipotentiary	October 14, 1960	November 26, 1960	Superseded, July 31, 1961	
Robinson McIlvaine – Career FSO	Ambassador Extraordinary and Plenipotentiary	June 22, 1961	July 31, 1961	March 19, 1964	
Clinton E. Knox – Career FSO	Ambassador Extraordinary and Plenipotentiary	July 9, 1964	August 18, 1964	June 11, 1969	
Matthew J. Looram, Jr. – Career FSO	Ambassador Extraordinary and Plenipotentiary	May 27, 1969	July 21, 1969	December 3, 1971	
Robert Anderson – Career FSO	Ambassador Extraordinary and Plenipotentiary	February 15, 1972	March 25, 1972	April 11, 1974	
James B. Engle – Career FSO	Ambassador Extraordinary and Plenipotentiary	July 23, 1974	November 26, 1974	February 15, 1976	
W. Kenneth Thompson	Chargé d’Affaires ad interim	-	August 1976	August 1978	
John S. Davidson	Chargé d’Affaires ad interim	-	September 1978	May 1980	
James R. Bullington	Chargé d’Affaires ad interim	-	June 1980	July 1982	
Charles H. Twining, Jr.	Chargé d’Affaires ad interim	-	July 1982	October 1983	
George E. Moose – Career FSO	Ambassador Extraordinary and Plenipotentiary	October 7, 1983	November 4, 1983	July 7, 1986	
Walter Edward Stadtler – Career FSO	Ambassador Extraordinary and Plenipotentiary	October 16, 1986	November 19, 1986	December 3, 1989	
Harriet Winsar Isom – Career FSO	Ambassador Extraordinary and Plenipotentiary	November 21, 1989	January 26, 1990	November 14, 1992	
Ruth A. Davis – Career FSO	Ambassador Extraordinary and Plenipotentiary	August 17, 1992	December 24, 1992	November 3, 1995	
John M. Yates – Career FSO	Ambassador Extraordinary and Plenipotentiary	November 3, 1995	November 24, 1995	October 27, 1998	
Robert C. Felder – Career FSO	Ambassador Extraordinary and Plenipotentiary	October 22, 1998	November 20, 1998	June 10, 2000	
Pamela E. Bridgewater – Career FSO	Ambassador Extraordinary and Plenipotentiary	September 15, 2000	November 24, 2000	December 10, 2002	
Wayne E. Neill – Career FSO	Ambassador Extraordinary and Plenipotentiary	April 16, 2003	July 4, 2003	July 22, 2006	
Gayleatha B. Brown – Career FSO	Ambassador Extraordinary and Plenipotentiary	July 5, 2006	September 8, 2006	August 22, 2009	
James Knight – Career FSO	Ambassador Extraordinary and Plenipotentiary	August 7, 2009	November 3, 2009	April 28, 2012	
Michael A. Raynor – Career FSO	Ambassador Extraordinary and Plenipotentiary	May 5, 2012	September 13, 2012	May 29, 2015	
Lucy Tamlyn – Career FSO	Ambassador Extraordinary and Plenipotentiary	October 13, 2015	November 8, 2015	October 19, 2018	
Patricia Mahoney – Career FSO	Ambassador Extraordinary and Plenipotentiary	January 7, 2019	July 4, 2019	February 1, 2022	
Brian W. Shukan – Career FSO	Ambassador Extraordinary and Plenipotentiary	December 18, 2021	May 5, 2022	February 20, 2026	
Brinille Eliane Ellis – Career FSO	Chargé d'affaires ad interim	February 20, 2026		March 7, 2026	
Shane Dixon – Career FSO	Chargé d'affaires ad interim	March 7, 2026		September 16, 2026	
Skye Justice – Career FSO	Chargé d'affaires ad interim	September 16, 2026		Present	

== See also ==
- Benin – United States relations
- Foreign relations of Benin
- Ambassadors of the United States
