= Elliott P. Skinner =

American diplomat (1924–2007)

Elliott Skinner

3rd United States Ambassador to Burkina Faso
- In office September 14, 1966 – July 16, 1969
- President: Lyndon B. Johnson
- Preceded by: Thomas S. Estes
- Succeeded by: William E. Schaufele, Jr.

Personal details
- Born: June 20, 1924 Port of Spain, Trinidad
- Died: April 1, 2007 (aged 82)
- Profession: Diplomat, anthropologist

Elliott Percival Skinner (June 20, 1924 – April 1, 2007) was an American anthropologist and United States Ambassador to the Republic of Upper Volta from 1966 to 1969.

== Background ==
Born in Port of Spain, Trinidad, in a family with four siblings and Barbadian ancestry on his father's side, Skinner came to the United States in 1943. He supported American values, and enlisted in the United States Army in 1944 and fought in World War II in France, which later allowed him to obtain citizenship. Skinner earned a bachelor's degree from New York University in 1951. He then attended Columbia University, where he earned a master's degree in 1952 and a doctorate in 1955. He was rejected for a PhD at Northwestern by Melville J. Herskovits who believed that "black scholars" could not study Africa objectively. His PhD thesis, working with Morton Fried, was "Ethnic Interaction in a British Guiana Rural Community: A Study in Secondary Acculturation and Group Dynamics." but his interests soon shifted back to Africa.

== Career ==
Skinner remained in universities for most of his career. From 1955 to 1957 as a post-doc, he shifted his research focus from Latin America to Upper Volta, living in the country and learning the More (Language) spoken by the Mossi, the majority ethnic group.

In 1959 he began as assistant professor of anthropology at New York University where he researched and taught African ethnology. He was the first African-American tenured by the university in 1963. In 1966, he joined the anthropology department at Columbia University and taught until his retirement in 1994. In 1969 he became Franz Boas Professor of Anthropology. In 1972, Skinner became the first African-American department chair at Columbia. He graduated numerous African-American and Black PhD scholars.

Importantly, Lyndon B. Johnson appointed him ambassador to Upper Volta from 1966 to 1969. He was almost certainly the only qualified Mossi-speaking, highly educated citizen for the role, which provided him with ample opportunity to also study urban and rural Burkinabe life, and particularly the fragile politics of post-independence from France. He was only 42 on starting as ambassador in Ouagadougou.

His best known work was a study of the Mossi people published in 1964, and extensively updated and republished in 1989 as The Mossi of Burkina Faso: Chiefs, Politicians and Soldiers (Waveland Press). The book served as a guide for countless English-speaking visitors and US volunteers to the country. His other books were on urban life and U.S. policy in Africa, notably African Urban Life: The Transformation of Ouagadougou (Yale, 1974) and African-Americans and United States Policy Toward Africa 1850-1924 (Howard University Press, 1992).

Skinner explored power, and how elites hold onto it, in much of his work. He was critical of some aspects of Thomas Sankara's charisma and revolutionary rule: "... while new-style African leaders may be understandably disgusted and tired of the manner in which their elders have dealt with both internal and external affairs, they themselves are not immune to the constraints found in the global system as soon as they start to chart fresh and perhaps revolutionary courses of action.".

== Awards ==
- Commandeur de l'Ordre National Voltaique, Burkina Faso
- Chairman of the Association of Black American Ambassadors (1988–92)
- Fellow, Center for Advanced Study in the Behavioral Sciences, Stanford University

== Elliott P. Skinner Book Award ==
The Elliott P. Skinner Book Award is an annual prize sponsored by the Association for Africanist Anthropology (AfAA), a section of the American Anthropological Association. Named in honor of Elliott P. Skinner, the award recognizes outstanding books that contribute significantly to the global community of Africanist scholars and further the interests of the African continent. The award is open to works from all sub-fields of anthropology, with a focus on books based on extensive fieldwork in Africa or those advancing innovative research methodologies. Awardees are selected for their originality, scholarly contribution, and potential to reach both academic and broader audiences. Awardees include prominent Africanists, such as Michael Lambek, James H. Smith, Yolanda Covington-Ward, James Ferguson, Serena Owusua Dankwa, Daniel Jordan Smith, and Jemima Pierre.

== Personal ==
He was married to Thelma, divorced in 1977. In 1982 he married Gwendolyn Mikell (b. 24 March 1948), who was the first tenured Black woman at Georgetown University, and now Emeritus Professor. On his death he had two daughters, three sons, seven grandchildren; and one great-grandchild.

On April 21, 2007, Skinner died of heart failure at his home in Washington, D.C., where he had moved on retirement. He was 82 years old.

Diplomatic posts
Preceded by Thomas S. Estes	United States Ambassador to Burkina Faso; 1966–1969	Succeeded by William E. Schaufele, Jr.
