= William E. Schaufele Jr. =

American diplomat (1923–2008)

William Schaufele
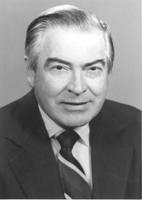

United States Ambassador to Poland
- In office March 30, 1978 – September 11, 1980
- President: Jimmy Carter
- Preceded by: Richard Davies
- Succeeded by: Francis J. Meehan

7th Assistant Secretary of State for African Affairs
- In office December 19, 1975 – July 17, 1977
- President: Gerald Ford; Jimmy Carter
- Preceded by: Nathaniel Davis
- Succeeded by: Richard M. Moose

7th Inspector General of the Department of State
- In office April 16, 1975 – November 29, 1975
- President: Gerald Ford
- Preceded by: James S. Sutterlin
- Succeeded by: Robert M. Sayre

United States Ambassador to Upper Volta
- In office October 16, 1969 – July 10, 1971
- President: Richard Nixon
- Preceded by: Elliott Skinner
- Succeeded by: Donald B. Easum

Personal details
- Born: William Everett Schaufele Jr. December 7, 1923 Lakewood, Ohio, U.S.
- Died: January 17, 2008 (aged 84) Salisbury, Connecticut, U.S.
- Education: Yale University (BA); Columbia University (MA)

William Everett Schaufele Jr. (December 7, 1923 – January 17, 2008) was an American diplomat and official at the United States Department of State.

== Life ==
Schaufele was born in Lakewood, Ohio, the son of William Elias Schaufele and Lillian Bergen. He briefly attended Yale University in 1942–43, before enlisting in the United States Army in March 1943. During World War II, he served in the 10th Armored Division, a part of the Third United States Army, which was commanded by George S. Patton. He participated in the Siege of Bastogne, a part of the larger Battle of the Bulge. Following the war, Schaufele resumed his studies at Yale, graduating in 1948 with a bachelor's degree in Government and International Affairs. He then enrolled in the Columbia University School of International and Public Affairs, from which he received an M.A. in 1950.

After graduation, Schaufele joined the United States Foreign Service in 1950. His first posting was in Germany as a resident officer in Frankfurt am Main (1950); a resident officer in Pfaffenhausen (1950–52); a resident officer in Augsburg (1952); a labor officer in Düsseldorf (1952); and, finally, as an economic and consular officer in Munich (1953–56). He returned to the United States in 1956, taking up an economic affairs position in the United States Department of State in Washington, D.C., and joining the faculty of the Foreign Service Institute in 1957. Schaufele returned to the field in 1959, serving as a political/labor officer in Casablanca until 1963.

In 1963, Schaufele opened an American consulate in Bukavu in the Republic of the Congo, which had gained its independence from Belgium in 1960 He returned to the United States in 1964, serving first as the head of the State Department's Congo desk, and then in a series of increasingly senior positions in the State Department's Bureau of African Affairs.

On September 29, 1969, President Richard Nixon appointed Schaufele as United States Ambassador to Upper Volta, a post he held until July 10, 1971. Nixon then named Ambassador Schaufele as the U.S.'s representative to the United Nations Security Council (with the rank of ambassador). On December 19, 1975, President Gerald Ford appointed Schaufele as Assistant Secretary of State for African Affairs, a post he held until July 17, 1977. President Jimmy Carter appointed Schaufele United States Ambassador to Poland on February 3, 1978. In that capacity, he was present in Poland for the election of Carol Cardinal Wojtila, Archbishop of Kraków, as Pope John Paul II and for the rise of the Solidarity movement.

Schaufele retired in 1980 with the rank of career minister. In retirement, he served as president of the Foreign Policy Association until 1985.

Diplomatic posts
Preceded by Elliott Skinner	United States Ambassador to Upper Volta; 1969–1971	Succeeded by Donald B. Easum
Preceded by Richard Davies	United States Ambassador to Poland; 1978–1980	Succeeded by Francis J. Meehan
Political offices
Preceded by Nathaniel Davis	Assistant Secretary of State for African Affairs; 1975–1977	Succeeded by Richard M. Moose
