= Wayne E. Neill =

American diplomat

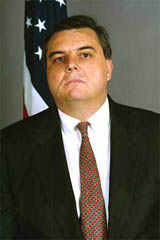

United States Ambassador to Benin
- In office April 16, 2003 – July 22, 2006
- President: George W. Bush
- Preceded by: Pamela E. Bridgewater
- Succeeded by: Gayleatha B. Brown

Personal details
- Born: 1957 (age 68–69)
- Education: University of Southern California, National War College, University of California, Los Angeles

Wayne E. Neill (born 1957) is an American retired diplomat who served as the United States Ambassador to Benin from 2003 to 2006.

Neill was nominated as ambassador on March 5, 2003, and confirmed on April 16, 2003, succeeding Pamela Bridgewater. He left the post on July 22, 2006, his successor being Gayleatha Brown.

== Consular career ==
Neill's first postings were to Poznań, Budapest, Tunis and Riyadh and in 1993, he was given the post of U.S. Energy Adviser at the Organisation for Economic Co-operation and Development in Paris. In 1997, he was assigned to the embassy in Cairo to be Political and Economic Counselor.

From 2000 to 2002, Neill was recalled to direct the Office of Regional and Security Affairs in the Bureau of African Affairs. In 2002, he was appointed Special Advisor to the Assistant Secretary of State for African Affairs.

Neill remained in this post until his nomination for the ambassadorship of Benin on March 5, 2003. The Senate confirmed Neill as United States Ambassador to Benin on April 16 the same year. He left his post as ambassador on July 22, 2006.

Neill retired from the Foreign Service in 2009 after serving as Political Advisor to the Combatant Commander of U.S. Joint Forces and NATO's Allied Command Transformation Command.

Diplomatic posts
Preceded by Pamela E. Bridgewater	United States Ambassador to Benin; 2003 - 2006	Succeeded by Gayleatha B. Brown
