= David H. Shinn =

American diplomat

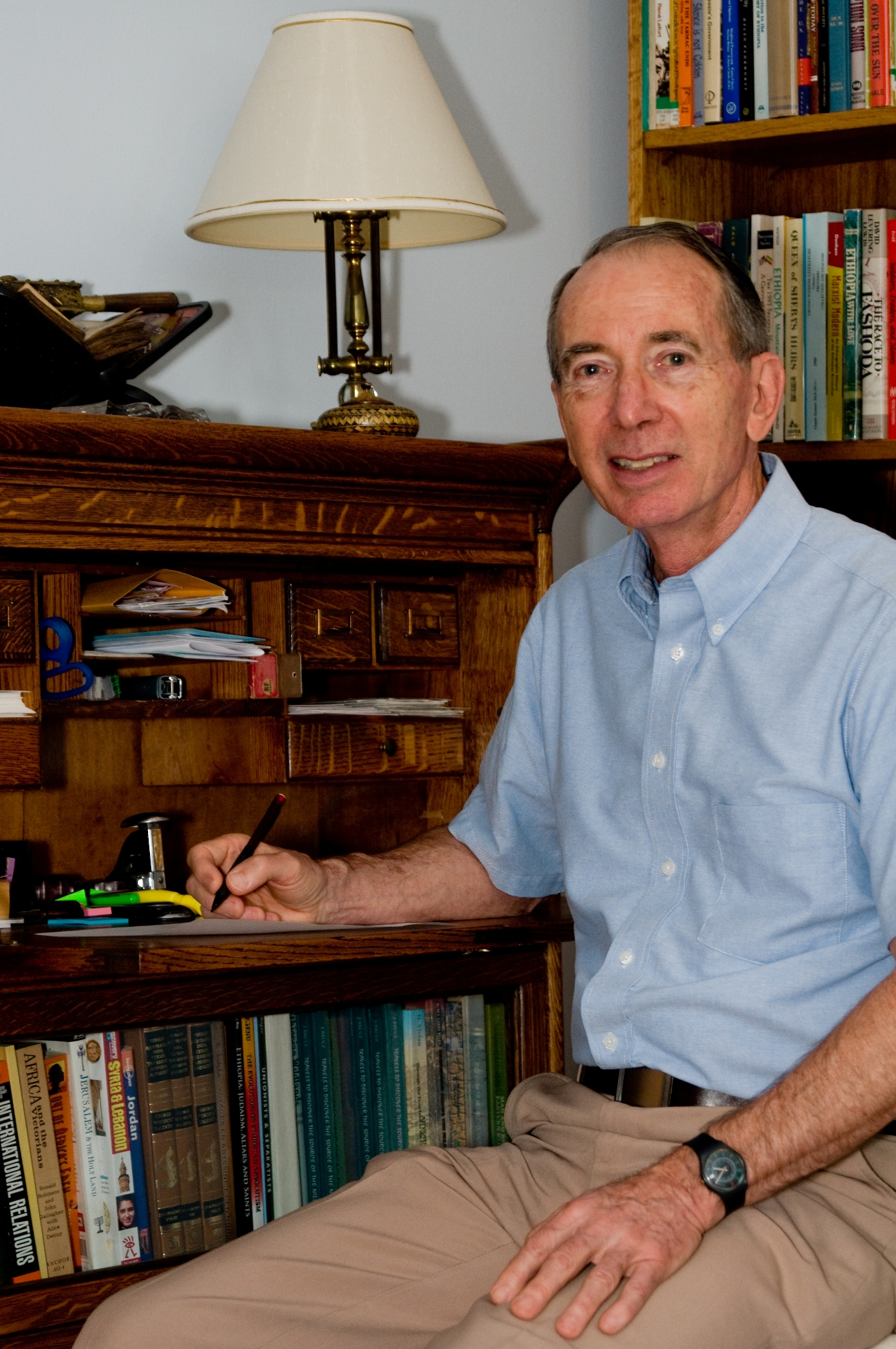

19th United States Ambassador to Ethiopia
- In office 1996–1999
- President: Bill Clinton
- Preceded by: Irvin Hicks
- Succeeded by: Tibor P. Nagy

Director for East African Affairs, United States Department of State
- In office 1993–1996

Deputy Task Force Director and Coordinator for Somalia, United States Department of State
- In office 1992–1993

10th United States Ambassador to Burkina Faso
- In office 1987–1990
- Preceded by: Leonardo Neher
- Succeeded by: Edward P. Brynn

Personal details
- Born: June 9, 1940 (age 86) Yakima, Washington
- Spouse: Judy Shinn
- Children: Chris Shinn, Steve Shinn
- Website: davidshinn.blogspot.com

David H. Shinn (born June 9, 1940) is an American diplomat and professor. He is an adjunct professor of International Affairs at The George Washington University's Elliott School of International Affairs. His diverse career in the foreign service of the United States has included ambassadorships to Ethiopia and Burkina Faso. Shinn is also a frequent commentator in the news media on political issues, and has provided consultancy to the U.S. government on Horn of Africa related matters as well as Sino-African relations.

== Education ==
Shinn received his B.A. (1962), M.A. (1963), and Ph.D. (1980) from George Washington University. He also received a certificate in African studies from Northwestern University and was diplomat-in-residence at University of California, Los Angeles and Southern University in Baton Rouge, Louisiana.

== Government service ==
Shinn served for 37 years in the United States Foreign Service with assignments at embassies in Lebanon, Kenya, Tanzania, Mauritania, Cameroon, Sudan, and as ambassador to Burkina Faso and Ethiopia.

== Philanthropy ==
Shinn is active in several non-governmental organizations focused on the Horn of Africa and the African Great Lakes region. He serves on the board of directors for Adeso, an NGO founded by the Somali environmentalist Fatima Jibrell. It conducts programs in Somalia, Kenya and South Sudan. Additionally, Shinn is on the board of directors of the Phi Theta Kappa Foundation.

== Awards ==
- 1994 – National Alumnus of the Year, American Association of Community Colleges
- 1995 – International Alumnus of the Year by Phi Theta Kappa, the community college scholastic honor society

== Notes ==
Diplomatic posts
| Preceded by Irvin Hicks | U.S. ambassador to Ethiopia; 1996–1999 | Succeeded by Tibor P. Nagy |
| Preceded by Leonardo Neher | U.S. ambassador to Burkina Faso; 1987–1990 | Succeeded by Edward P. Brynn |
