= J. Thomas Dougherty =

American diplomat

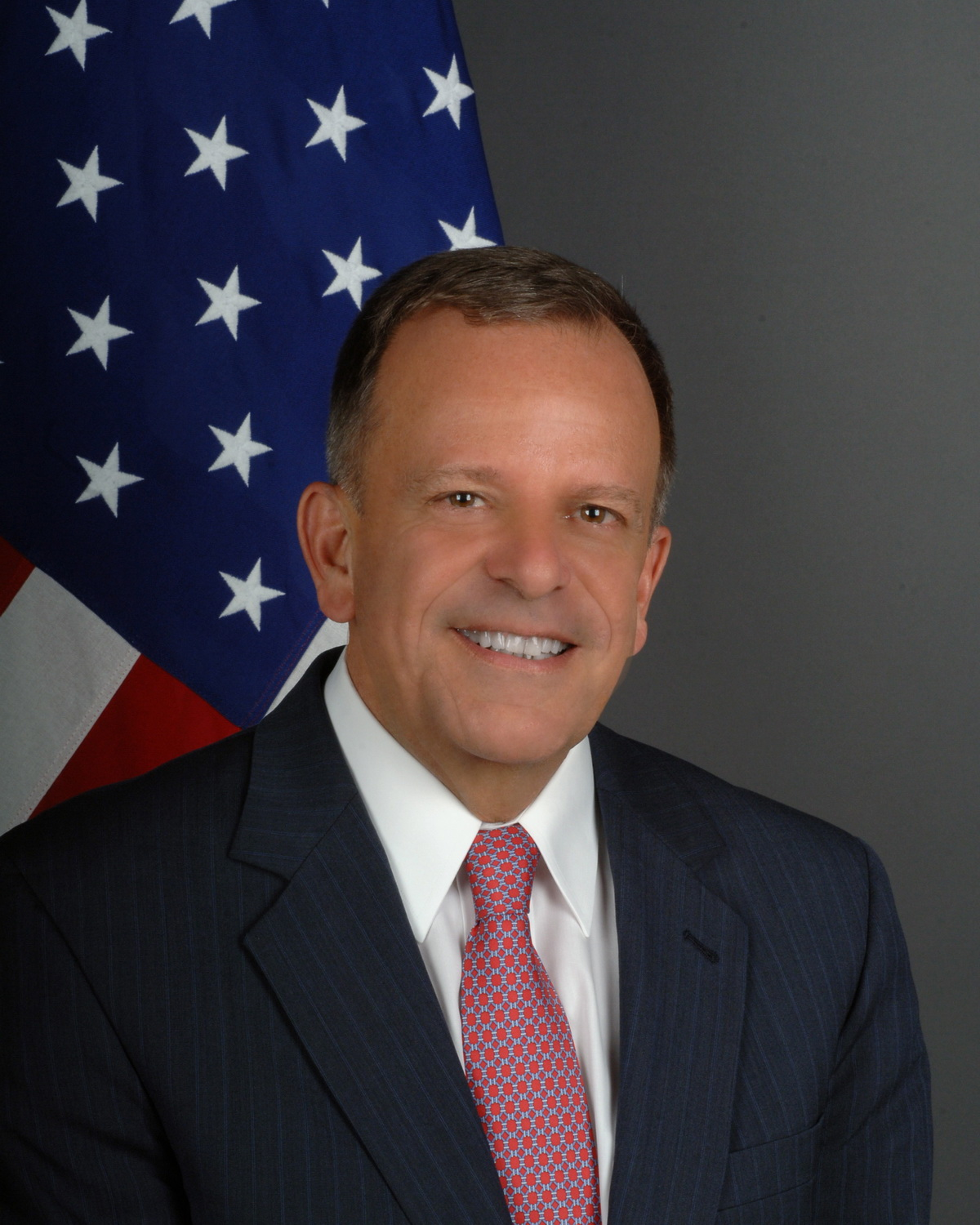

18th United States Ambassador to Burkina Faso
- In office September 30, 2010 – September 30, 2013
- President: Barack Obama
- Preceded by: Gayleatha B. Brown
- Succeeded by: Tulinabo S. Mushingi

Personal details
- Born: 1951 (age 74–75) Casper, Wyoming, U.S.
- Profession: Diplomat

J. Thomas Dougherty (born 1951) is an American diplomat. He was the United States Ambassador to Burkina Faso from 2010 to 2013. He is currently the executive director of the Australian-American Fulbright Commission, based in Canberra, Australia.

== Biography ==
Dougherty is from Casper, Wyoming. He was nominated to be the ambassador of the United States to Burkina Faso by President Barack Obama on May 27, 2010, and confirmed by Congress on August 5, 2010. He presented his credentials on September 30, 2010, and served until September 30, 2013.

Dougherty retired as a member of the Senior Foreign Service at the U.S. State Department in July 2016 after a 27-year career. He served as Ambassador in Burkina Faso from 2010 to 2013, and then as Deputy Chief of Mission in Australia from 2013 to 2016. He was Minister-Counselor for Public Affairs at the U.S. Embassy in Baghdad, and served in the Bureau of African Affairs as Office Director for West Africa and then as acting Deputy Assistant Secretary. He was Deputy Chief of Mission in Kinshasa from 2004 to 2007 and in Lilongwe from 2001 to 2004. His overseas assignments as a public affairs officer with USIA and then State were in Yaoundé, Bonn, Asmara, Brazzaville, Jeddah, and Dakar. He is the recipient of multiple State Department awards and speaks French, German, Italian, and some Arabic.

== Early life and education ==
Dougherty entered the Foreign Service after working as a dean and teacher in international schools in Belgium and in Switzerland, and as an editor and translator in Germany. His undergraduate degree from Brown University was followed by graduate work in California and at the Università per Stranieri in Perugia, Italy. He was awarded a Marshall Scholarship. He received a Fulbright grant for study in Indonesia, and a National Endowment for the Humanities fellowship to study the works of George Kennan.

Diplomatic posts
Preceded by Gayleatha B. Brown	United States Ambassador to Burkina Faso; 2010–2013	Succeeded by Tulinabo S. Mushingi
