= Donald J. McConnell =

American diplomat (born 1939)

12th United States Ambassador to Burkina Faso
- In office November 22, 1993 – June 4, 1996
- President: Bill Clinton
- Preceded by: Edward P. Brynn
- Succeeded by: Sharon P. Wilkinson

4th United States Ambassador to Eritrea
- In office October 3, 2001 – July 16, 2004
- President: George W. Bush
- Preceded by: William Davis Clarke
- Succeeded by: Scott H. DeLisi

Personal details
- Born: 1939 (age 86–87) Ohio, U.S.
- Education: John Carroll University; Stanford University; Harvard Kennedy School
- Profession: Diplomat

Donald J. McConnell (born 1939) is an American diplomat. He was born in Ohio in 1939, and served as the United States Ambassador to Burkina Faso from 1993 to 1996 and to Eritrea from 2001 to 2004.

Diplomatic posts
Preceded by Edward P. Brynn	United States Ambassador to Burkina Faso; 1993–1996	Succeeded by Sharon P. Wilkinson
Preceded by William Davis Clarke	United States Ambassador to Eritrea; 2001–2004	Succeeded by Scott H. DeLisi
