= William Davis Clarke =

American diplomat (born 1941)

William D. Clarke, Sr.

12th United States Ambassador to Eritrea
- In office August 20, 1998 – August 12, 2001
- President: Bill Clinton; George W. Bush
- Preceded by: John F. Hicks
- Succeeded by: Donald J. McConnell

Personal details
- Born: 1941 (age 84–85)
- Education: Howard University; Industrial College of the Armed Forces
- Profession: Diplomat

William D. Clarke, Sr. (born 1941) is an American diplomat. Clarke served as the United States Ambassador to Eritrea from 1998 to 2001. He previously served over 30 years as a diplomat and member of the Diplomatic Security Service, including becoming the Deputy Assistant Secretary for Countermeasures and Information Security before his ambassadorship.

On October 3, 2022, the State Department announced a fellowship enabling a pipeline to become Diplomatic Security Service Special Agent named in Clarke's honor.

Diplomatic posts
Preceded by John F. Hicks	United States Ambassador to Eritrea; 1998–2001	Succeeded by Donald J. McConnell
