= Leonardo Neher =

American diplomat

9th United States Ambassador to Burkina Faso
- In office September 21, 1984 – August 1, 1987
- President: Ronald Reagan
- Preceded by: Julius Waring Walker, Jr.
- Succeeded by: David H. Shinn

Personal details
- Born: December 5, 1922 Cincinnati, Ohio
- Died: May 11, 2015 (aged 92)
- Profession: Diplomat

Leonardo Neher (December 5, 1922 – May 11, 2015) was an American diplomat. He was the United States Ambassador to Burkina Faso from 1984 to 1987 (then the Republic of Upper Volta).

== Biography ==
Neher was born on December 5, 1922, in Cincinnati, Ohio. He attended Akron University from 1940 to 1941, and later graduated from Bowling Green State University with a B.A. in 1948 and the University of Chicago with a M.A. in 1952. Neher served in the U.S. Army in 1943 and left in 1946. He was a personnel technician at the Department of the Navy from 1952 to 1954.

In 1954 he entered the U.S. Foreign Service as a consular officer in Turkey. He was economic and political officer in Algeria from 1957–1961, commercial officer in South Vietnam from 1962 to 1964 and in Syria from 1964 to 1968. He was arms policy officer in the Bureau of Political-Military Affairs in the State Department from 1966 to 1968. He was on detail to the Department of Defense as assistant, foreign military rights affairs, international security affairs, in 1968 - 1970. He was principal officer in Zaire from 1970 to 1972, deputy chief of mission in Chad from 1972 to 1974, and counselor for political affairs in the Dominican Republic from 1974 to 1977. In 1977, he was on detail to the Environmental Protection Agency (EPA) as assistant for plans and policies until 1979. In the State Department he was Staff Director of the Board of Examiners for the Foreign Service from 1979 to 1981, Inspector in the Office of the Inspector General in 1981, and Deputy Director of the Office of Analysis for Africa later on in 1981. In 1982, he was the Director of the Office of Analysis for Africa.

On June 18, 1984, he was nominated to be the United States Ambassador to Upper Volta by President Ronald Reagan while he was a resident in Maryland. He remained in that post until August 1, 1987, where he was succeeded by David H. Shinn.

His foreign languages are Spanish and French. Neher died on May 11, 2015.

Diplomatic posts
Preceded by Julius Waring Walker, Jr.	United States Ambassador to Burkina Faso; 1984–1987	Succeeded by David H. Shinn
