= J. Anthony Holmes =

American diplomat (born 1950)

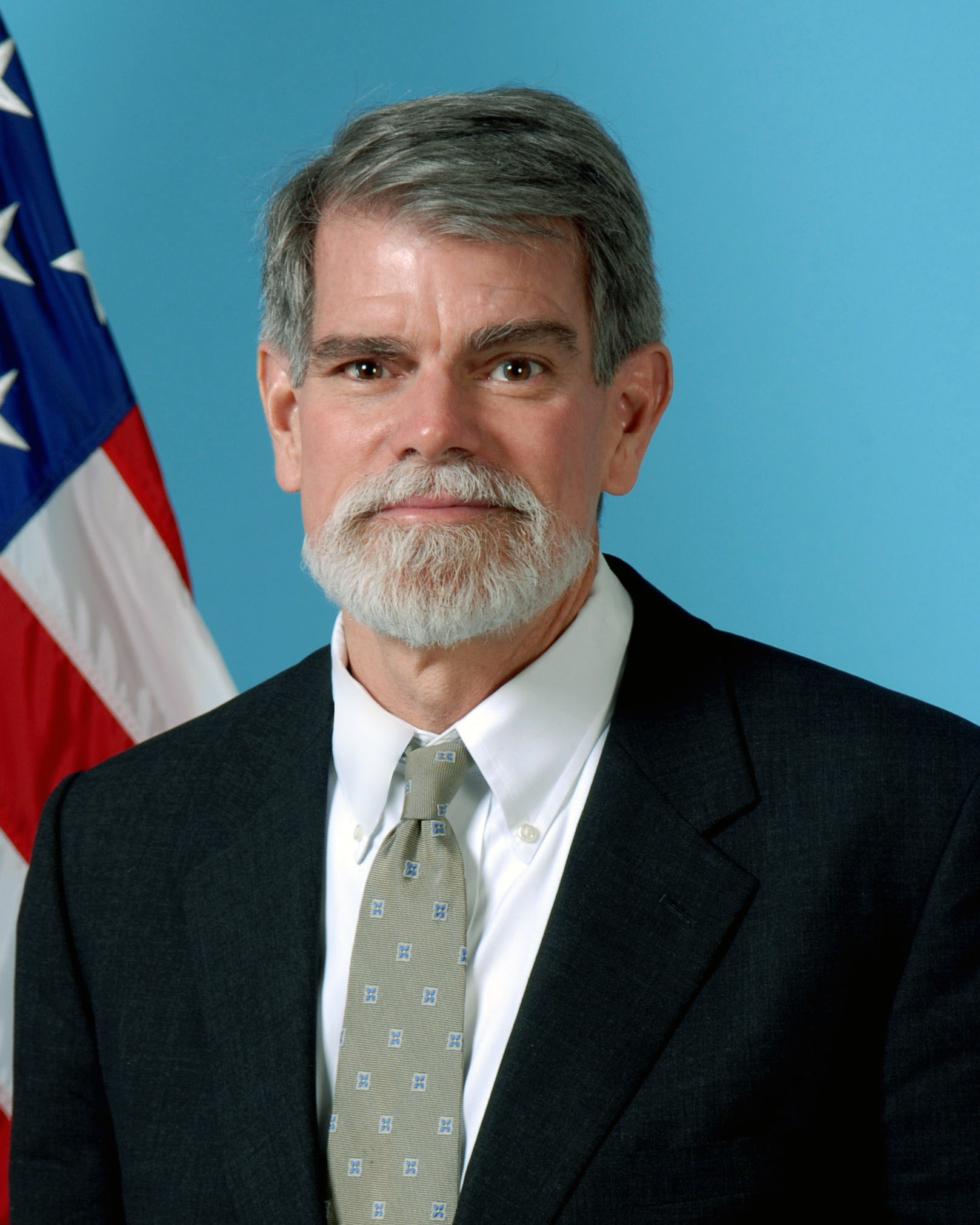
- J. Anthony Holmes

15th United States Ambassador to Burkina Faso
- In office December 23, 2002 – July 9, 2005
- President: George W. Bush
- Preceded by: Jimmy J. Kolker
- Succeeded by: Jeanine E. Jackson

Personal details
- Born: 1950 (age 75–76)

Military service
- Allegiance: United States of America
- Branch/service: United States Department of State
- Unit: U.S. Africa Command
- Commands: Deputy to the Commander for Civil-Military Activity, U.S. Africa Command

J. Anthony Holmes (born 1950) was the Deputy to the Commander for Civil-Military Activity, U.S. Africa Command until 2012. USAFRICOM was formally stood up in October 2007, as a subunified command initially of EUCOM, under the command of General William E. Ward, who was the first commander of AFRICOM.

Prior to his assignment to U.S. Africa Command, Ambassador Holmes was the Cyrus Vance Fellow in Diplomatic Studies at the Council on Foreign Relations (CFR), focusing on Africa and African Policy Issues. From 2005 to 2007, he was the elected president of the 13,700-member American Foreign Service Association, which is the professional association and exclusive representative of the United States Foreign Service.

Ambassador Holmes served as the U.S. Ambassador to the Republic of Burkina Faso from 2002 to 2005. Resolving misunderstandings and improving the U.S.–Burkina Faso relationship, Holmes also helped development of democracy and human rights, and the fights against HIV/AIDS and trafficking in children.

Holmes was director of the Africa Bureau's Economic Policy Office from 1999 to 2002, where he worked on an array of issues, including the HIV/AIDS pandemic and working on Africa debt policy.

Holmes has spent many of his thirty-year Foreign Service career on issues affecting Africa, including service as the economic-commercial section chief in Harare and in the economic section in Nairobi. Ambassador Holmes has also worked in Egypt and in Syria. Additionally, he also headed the economic sections in Singapore and Sweden and served as the deputy director of the State Department’s office of sanctions policy.

Holmes holds a BA in Comparative Religion and an MA in Economic Geography from the University of Georgia, as well as an MBA from the Thunderbird School of International Management.

Diplomatic posts
Preceded by Jimmy J. Kolker	United States Ambassador to Burkina Faso; 2002–2005	Succeeded by Jeanine E. Jackson
