= Julius Waring Walker Jr. =

American diplomat

8th United States Ambassador to Burkina Faso
- In office November 18, 1981 – July 5, 1984
- President: Ronald Reagan
- Preceded by: Thomas D. Boyatt
- Succeeded by: Leonardo Neher

Personal details
- Born: February 21, 1927 Plainview, Texas, U.S.
- Died: December 5, 2003 (aged 76) Washington, D.C., U.S.
- Spouse: Savannah Tunnell
- Education: University of Texas at Austin (BFA); George Washington University (MS)
- Profession: Diplomat

Julius Waring Walker Jr. (February 21, 1927 – December 5, 2003) was an American diplomat and United States Ambassador to Upper Volta (now Burkina Faso) from 1981 to 1984.

== Biography ==
Walker was born February 21, 1927, in Plainview, Texas. He was employed in Texas in the private industry, serving successively as assistant manager of a grocery store, claims adjuster of an insurance company, newspaper reporter, and television announcer from 1950 to 1956. In 1950, he received his B.F.A. from the University of Texas and later on his M.S. in 1973 from George Washington University.

Walker entered the U.S. Foreign Service in 1956 as an information officer with the News Division in the State Department. From 1958 to 1961 he was a consular officer in Malta, and political officer in Burundi from 1961 to 1963. In the Department he was personnel officer in the Bureau of Personnel from 1963 to 1965 as well as international relations officer from 1965 to 1966. During 1966 to 1969, he was Deputy Chief of Mission in Chad and political officer in England from 1969 to 1972. He was associated with the National War College from 1972 to 1973. He became Director of the Office of African Regional Affairs in the State Department from 1973 to 1975, Director of the Office of Directorate for Transportation and Communication Agencies from 1975 to 76, and Director of the Office of International Conferences from 1976 to 1978. From 1978 to 1981 he was Deputy Chief of Mission in Liberia.

On June 27, 1981, Walker was nominated to be the United States Ambassador to Upper Volta by President Reagan. He remained at that post until July 5, 1984. He was married to his wife, Savannah Tunnell, and had three children. He died in 2003.

Diplomatic posts
| Preceded by Thomas D. Boyatt | United States Ambassador to Burkina Faso; 1981–1984 | Succeeded by Leonardo Neher |
