= R. Borden Reams =

American diplomat

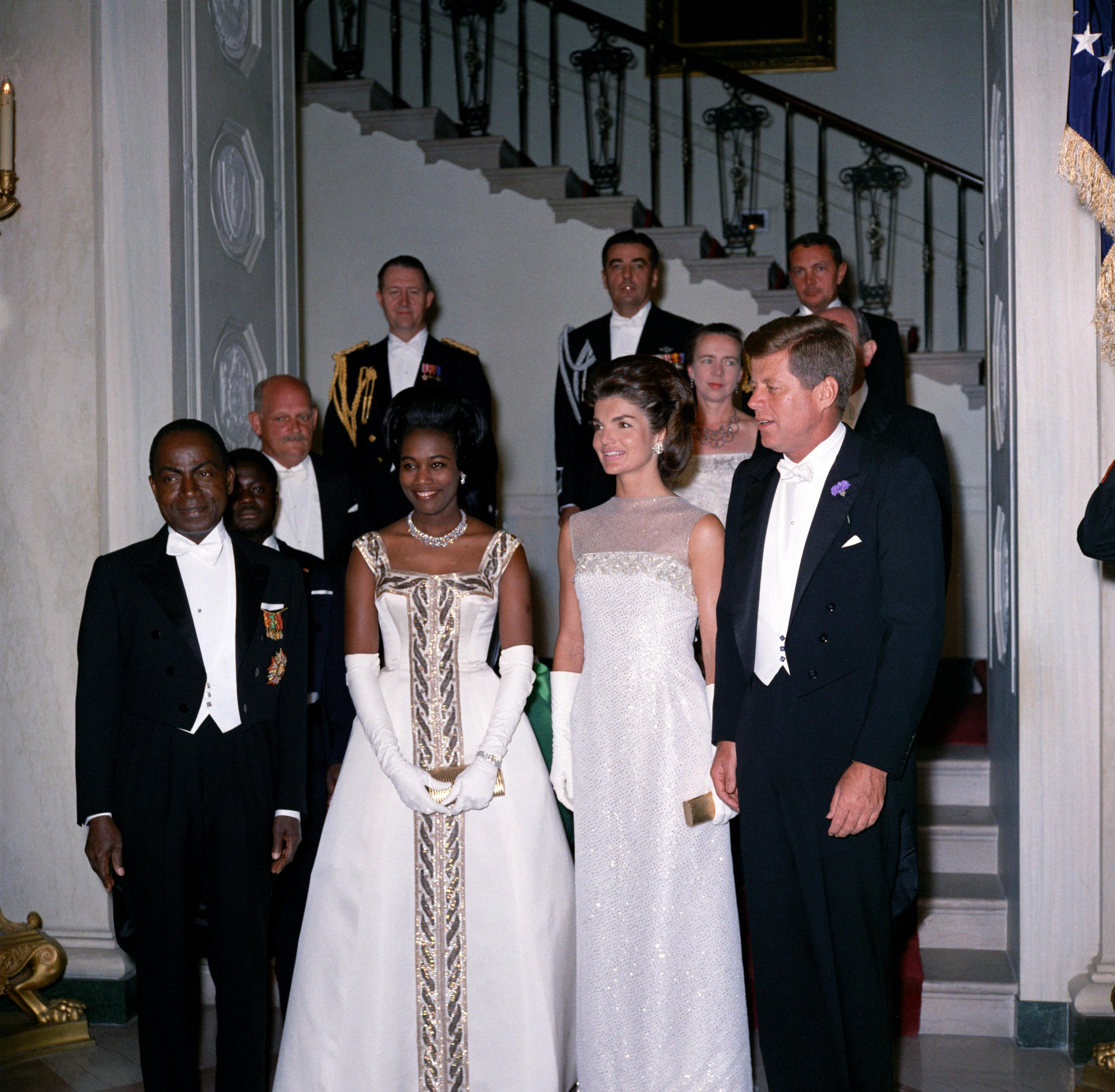
- R. Borden Reams with Félix Houphouët-Boigny, John F. Kennedy and Jackie Kennedy in 1962

1st United States Ambassador to Burkina Faso
- In office December 6, 1960 – June 26, 1961
- President: Dwight D. Eisenhower
- Preceded by: office established
- Succeeded by: Thomas S. Estes

1st United States Ambassador to Benin
- In office November 26, 1960 – July 31, 1961
- President: Dwight D. Eisenhower
- Preceded by: office established
- Succeeded by: Robinson McIlvaine

1st United States Ambassador to Niger
- In office November 23, 1960 – August 2, 1961
- President: Dwight D. Eisenhower
- Preceded by: office established
- Succeeded by: Mercer Cook

1st United States Ambassador to Côte d'Ivoire
- In office November 20, 1960 – May 12, 1962
- President: Dwight D. Eisenhower
- Preceded by: office established
- Succeeded by: James Wine

United States Minister to Denmark Acting
- In office June 5, 1940 – December 20, 1941
- President: Franklin D. Roosevelt
- Preceded by: Ray Atherton
- Succeeded by: Monnett Bain Davis (1945)

Personal details
- Born: January 27, 1904 Luthersburg, Pennsylvania
- Died: March 26, 1994 (aged 90) Panama City, Florida
- Spouse: Charlotte Johns
- Profession: Diplomat

Robert Borden Reams (January 27, 1904 – March 26, 1994) was an American diplomat. He was the first United States Ambassador to Upper Volta (now Burkina Faso), Dahomey (now Benin), Niger, and Ivory Coast (now Côte d'Ivoire) simultaneously. On July 31, 1960, an envoy, Donald R. Norland, had presented his credentials as Chargé d'Affaires ad interim on the previous day of Reams' appointment.

== Biography ==
Reams was born in Luthersburg, Clearfield County, Pennsylvania, on January 27, 1904. He was the son of John Homer Reams and Lulu Ann (Borden) Reams. He married Charlotte Johns on April 6, 1924, divorced her in 1947 and married Dorothy Yovich that same year. He later joined the U.S. Foreign Service and served as U.S. Vice Consul in Le Havre, France from 1929 to 1931, South Africa in Johannesburg from 1931 to 1933 and again from 1935 to 1936; From 1933 to 1935 Reams was U.S. Vice Consul in Port Elizabeth, South Africa. He later became U.S. Consul in Copenhagen, Denmark in 1937 until 1940.

Reams served as the specialist on Jewish issues for the State Department's Division of European Affairs during World War II. In the role he downplayed reports of Nazi exterminations of Jews in Europe, casting doubts on diplomatic cables that sought to notify the United Nations and raise alarm. Reams concluded the reports of mass deportation and murder were accurate, but wrote in 1942 that if the State Department corroborated such information, it would have exposed governments to "increased pressure... to do something."

On October 14, 1960, Reams was nominated to be the U.S. Ambassador to Dahomey, Niger, Ivory Coast, and Upper Volta by President Dwight D. Eisenhower. He was a resident at Abidjan during his ambassadorship. By 1962, Reams had been superseded by respective ambassadors to each country he represented.

Reams died from an aortic aneurysm on March 26, 1994, at the age of 90.

Diplomatic posts
Preceded by office established	United States Ambassador to Benin; 1960–1961	Succeeded by Robinson McIlvaine
Preceded by office established	United States Ambassador to Burkina Faso; 1960–1961	Succeeded by Thomas S. Estes
Preceded by office established	United States Ambassador to Niger; 1960–1961	Succeeded by Mercer Cook
