= Jimmy J. Kolker =

American diplomat (born 1948)

15th United States Ambassador to Uganda
- In office November 9, 2002 – September 30, 2005
- President: George W. Bush
- Preceded by: Martin George Brennan
- Succeeded by: Steven A. Browning

14th United States Ambassador to Burkina Faso
- In office November 16, 1999 – August 2, 2002
- President: Bill Clinton; George W. Bush
- Preceded by: Sharon P. Wilkinson
- Succeeded by: J. Anthony Holmes

Personal details
- Born: 1948 (age 77–78) St. Louis, Missouri, U.S.
- Spouse: Britt-Marie Forslund
- Education: Carleton College; Harvard University
- Profession: Diplomat

Jimmy J. Kolker (born 1948) is an American diplomat. He was the ambassador to Burkina Faso from 1999 to 2002 and Uganda from 2002 to 2005. He was Chief of the HIV/AIDS Section at UNICEF’s New York headquarters from 2007 to 2011. From 2011 to 2017, Ambassador Kolker was Assistant Secretary for Global Affairs, U.S. Department of Health and Human Services in Washington, DC.

Ambassador Kolker was recalled to the State Department in 2021 as senior advisor to the Bureau of Global Health Security and Diplomacy, working part time. He left State in April 2026. Outside of government, he serves on the boards of MANA Nutrition, the G4 Global Surgery Alliance, Building Tomorrow, American Diplomacy Publications and the Central Asia Initiative. He was (2018-2021) an adjunct assistant professor at Georgetown University's School of Foreign Service Security Studies Program and is a fellow at the Center for Strategic and International Studies. He is an advisor to Last Mile Health, and to Texas Children's Hospital's Global HOPE pediatric cancer initiative and to the Augusta Victoria Hospital in Jerusalem. He is author of the chapter on "Health and Science Diplomacy" in the textbook "Diplomatic Tradecraft", edited by N, Kralev, published by Cambridge University Press in 2024,

In 2019, Ambassador Kolker was the commencement speaker at Carleton College, and in 2024 at Nova Southeastern University. He received Honorary Doctorate of Humane Letters degrees at the ceremonies.

== Early life ==
Kolker graduated from Ladue Horton Watkins High School in 1966.

== Early life and education ==
Jimmy Kolker was born in 1948 in St. Louis, Missouri. He graduated with a B.A., magna cum laude from Carleton College and received a Thomas J. Watson Fellowship 1970–71, which he spent in Chad, Uganda and Ghana. Kolker earned a master's degree in Public Administration from Harvard University Kennedy School in 1983.

== Career ==
He served for four years on the Senate staff of U.S. Senator James Abourezk.

Kolker joined the U.S. foreign service in 1977, and held diplomatic reporting posts in Mozambique, Zimbabwe, Sweden, and the United Kingdom. He then moved to management jobs as Deputy Chief of Mission at the American Embassy in Botswana from 1990 to 1994, and in Copenhagen, Denmark from 1996 to 1999.

President Bill Clinton nominated Kolker as United States Ambassador to Burkina Faso on July 1, 1999, and he was confirmed by the U.S. Senate in November, 1999. He left the post on August 2, 2002.

President George W. Bush nominated Kolker as United States Ambassador to Uganda and he was confirmed on October 3, 2002. He left this post on September 30, 2005.

From 2005 to 2007, Kolker was Deputy U.S. Global AIDS Coordinator, leading implementation of the President's Emergency Plan for AIDS Relief (PEPFAR). From 2007 to 2011, Kolker was Chief of the HIV/AIDS Section at UNICEF’s New York headquarters. He led UNICEF's work on HIV and AIDS, focusing on mother-to-child-transmission of HIV, pediatric treatment, prevention among adolescents and young people and protection for children and families affected by AIDS.

In November 2011, Kolker returned to the U.S. Government, taking on the role of Principal Deputy Assistant Secretary for Global Affairs in the U. S. Department of Health and Human Services. This office is part of the Office of the HHS Secretary. In 2014, Ambassador Kolker was promoted to Assistant Secretary for Global Affairs in the U. S. Department of Health and Human Services. Kolker represented HHS at interagency and World Health Organization meetings, including a leadership role during the West Africa Ebola outbreak. He was also alternate US board member of the Global Fund to Fight AIDS, TB and Malaria.

== Personal life ==
Kolker speaks French, Swedish, and Portuguese as foreign languages. He is married to Britt-Marie Forslund. They have two daughters – Anne and Eva.

Diplomatic posts
Preceded by Sharon P. Wilkinson	United States Ambassador to Burkina Faso; 1999–2002	Succeeded by J. Anthony Holmes
Preceded by Martin George Brennan	United States Ambassador to Uganda; 2002–2005	Succeeded by Steven A. Browning
