= James B. Engle =

American diplomat

James Bruce Engle (April 16, 1919 – November 7, 2017) was an American diplomat. A career Foreign Service Officer, he served as U.S. Ambassador to Benin (November 26, 1974 – February 15, 1976).

Born in a sod hut in Billings, Montana, James Engle was first in his class at Burlington Junior College in Iowa and went on to study at The University of Chicago. He went on to attend the Harvard Business School, and went to Oxford University at Exeter College with a Rhodes Scholarship, as well as receiving a Fulbright Scholarship to study at Instituto Italiano Studi Storici. He was the first Rhodes Scholar to also receive a Fulbright Scholarship. He also studied at Cambridge University with a Rockefeller Public Service Award.

Engle served in the Navy during and after World War II, and assisted in the development of NATO and the implementation of the Marshall Plan in the years after the war. He served in the U.S. diplomatic corps for 46 years, holding positions in Nicaragua and Vietnam before serving as ambassador to Benin (then Dahomey).

Following his retirement from the foreign service, James Engle moved to Peacham, Vermont, where he helped to found and served as the first president of Vermont Coverts, an organization dedicated to informing landowners about the maintenance of wildlife habitats.

Diplomatic posts
Preceded by Robert Anderson	United States Ambassador to Benin; 1974–1976	Succeeded by George E. Moose
