= Sharon P. Wilkinson =

American diplomat

13th United States Ambassador to Burkina Faso
- In office October 24, 1996 – July 12, 1999
- President: Bill Clinton
- Preceded by: Donald J. McConnell
- Succeeded by: Jimmy J. Kolker

8th United States Ambassador to Mozambique
- In office October 25, 2000 – July 21, 2003
- President: Bill Clinton
- Preceded by: Brian D. Curran
- Succeeded by: Helen La Lime

Personal details
- Born: 1947 (age 78–79) New York City, New York, U.S.
- Profession: Diplomat

Sharon P. Wilkinson (born 1947) is an American diplomat. She served as United States Ambassador to Burkina Faso from 1996 to 1999 and United States Ambassador to Mozambique from 2000 to 2003.

== Biography ==
Sharon Wilkinson was born in New York City in 1947. She received her BA in International Relations from Brown University and Master of Arts in Teaching from the University of Chicago. She began her career in the Foreign service as vice consul in Sao Paulo, Brazil, and later as consul in Accra, Ghana. She served as a program officer for Africa in the Bureau of Cultural Affairs in Washington D.C., as well as staff assistant to the assistant secretary for Inter-American Affairs. She also served in Lisbon, Portugal, and as a management analyst for the Office of Management Operations.

She spent one year as director of the Face-To-Face Program at the Carnegie Endowment for International Peace. She was assigned as deputy principal officer in Tijuana, Mexico. She directed the Office of Diplomatic and Public Liaison in the Bureau of Consular Affairs in Washington, followed by an assignment as consul general in Curaçao. She then departed for Lisbon again, where she served as chargée d'affaires before completing her tour as deputy chief of mission. In 1995, President Bill Clinton nominated her as the U.S. ambassador to Burkina Faso. In 2000, she was nominated again by Clinton as ambassador to Mozambique.

Prior to this, she was the Assistant Dean for Global Engagement at Arizona State University. She speaks Portuguese, Spanish and French as foreign languages, and is a Career Member of the Senior Foreign Service, Class of Minister Counselor.

Diplomatic posts
Preceded by Donald J. McConnell	United States Ambassador to Burkina Faso; 1996–1999	Succeeded by Jimmy J. Kolker
Preceded by Brian D. Curran	United States Ambassador to Mozambique; 2000–2003	Succeeded by Helen R. Meagher La Lime
