= Joann M. Lockard =

American diplomat

Joann Lockard
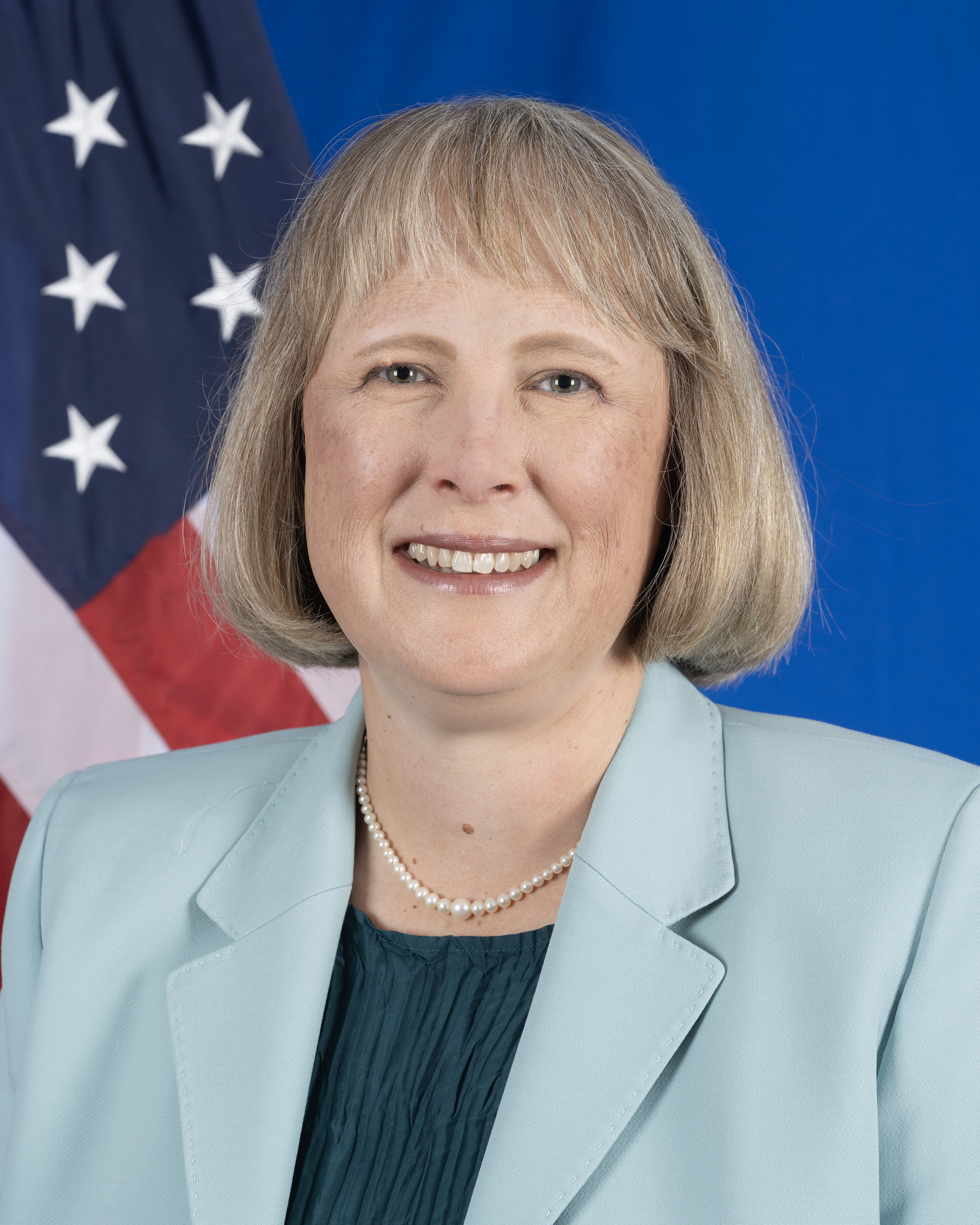
- Official portrait, 2024

United States Ambassador to Burkina Faso
- Incumbent
- Assumed office June 28, 2024
- President: Joe Biden; Donald Trump
- Preceded by: Sandra E. Clark

Personal details
- Born: Joann M. Lockard
- Education: George Washington University (BA); National War College (MS)

Joann M. Lockard is an American diplomat who has served as United States ambassador to Burkina Faso since 2024.

== Early life and education ==
Lockard obtained a Bachelor of Arts from George Washington University and her Master of Science from the National War College.

== Career ==
Lockard is a career member of the Senior Foreign Service, with the rank of Counselor. From 2020 to 2023, she served as the Deputy Chief of Mission at the U.S. Embassy in Abidjan, Ivory Coast. Previously, Lockard was the Counselor for Public Affairs at the U.S. embassy in Prague, Czech Republic, as well as the U.S. embassy in The Hague, Netherlands. Other assignments in U.S. embassies include those in San Salvador, El Salvador; Almaty, Kazakhstan; Kampala, Uganda; and Ouagadougou, Burkina Faso. In Washington, D.C., Lockard served as a Nordic-Baltic Public Diplomacy Desk Officer in the State Department.

=== U.S. ambassador to Burkina Faso ===
On July 25, 2023, President Joe Biden nominated Lockard to serve as the next ambassador to Burkina Faso. The entire Senate confirmed her nomination on May 2, 2024 by voice vote. She presented her credentials to Ibrahim Traoré on June 28, 2024.

== Personal life ==
Lockard's husband, Aaron Lockard, is also a Foreign Service Officer. They have three children. Lockard speaks French, Czech, Dutch, Spanish, and Russian.
