= Andrew Robert Young =

American diplomat and ambassador

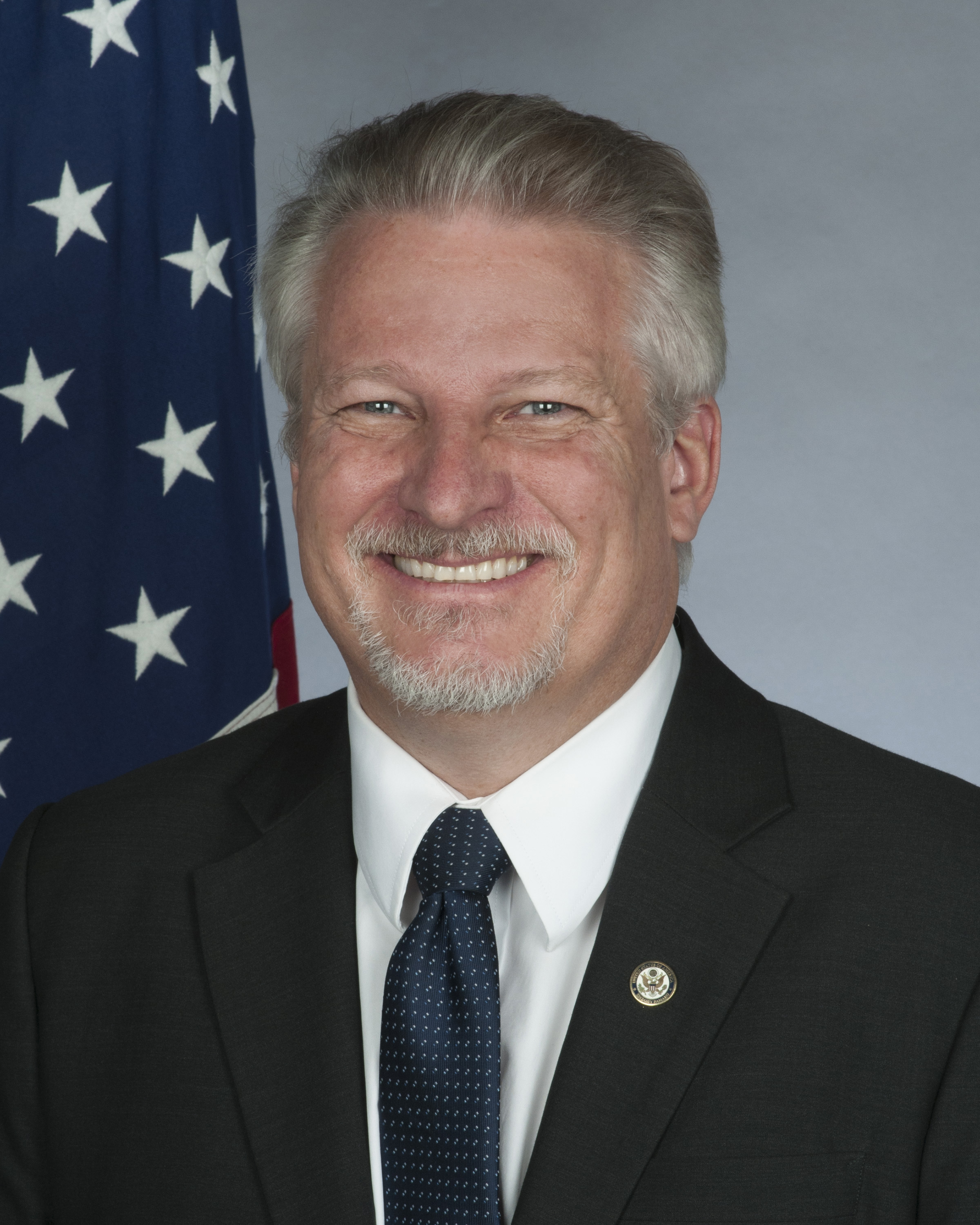

United States Ambassador to Burkina Faso
- In office November 20, 2016 – March 26, 2020
- President: Barack Obama; Donald Trump
- Preceded by: Tulinabo S. Mushingi
- Succeeded by: Sandra E. Clark

Personal details
- Born: April 18, 1961 (age 65) Downey, California
- Spouse: Margaret Young
- Children: Nathan and Claire Young
- Education: University of California Berkeley; Johns Hopkins School of Advanced International Studies

Andrew Robert Young (born April 18, 1961) is an American diplomat who has served as United States Ambassador to Burkina Faso from 2016 to 2020.

He attended University of California Berkeley and the Johns Hopkins School of Advanced International Studies. He was confirmed as ambassador on September 28, 2016, and succeeded Tulinabo S. Mushingi.

== Consular career ==
Young's first posting after joining the U.S. Foreign Service in 1991 was as a consular officer in Hong Kong. He then transferred to Washington, D.C., in 1993 to work at the India and Bhutan Desk in the Bureau of South Asian Affairs. In 1995, Young was made political and economic section chief in Bombay, India, and two years later was assigned to the post of political officer in Rangoon, Myanmar.

From 2000 to 2003 Young served as deputy principal officer in Auckland, New Zealand, after which he was the foreign policy adviser to Senator Joe Lieberman. He returned to foreign service work in 2005 when he was given an assignment in the Bureau of European and Eurasian Affairs at the Italy and San Marino Desk, and in 2007 he was sent to be political officer in the Paris, France consulate.

In 2010, Young was sent to serve as the information officer for the Seoul embassy where he learned to speak Korean, and from 2013 until his appointment to ambassador in 2016, Young worked as deputy chief of mission in Bamako, Mali.

In March 2020, he became the first American ambassador to be diagnosed with COVID-19, as a part of the COVID-19 pandemic in Burkina Faso.

Diplomatic posts
Preceded by Tulinabo S. Mushingi	United States Ambassador to Burkina Faso; 2016–2020	Succeeded by Sandra E. Clark
