= Pamela Bridgewater =

American diplomat and writer (born 1947)

Pamela E. Bridgewater
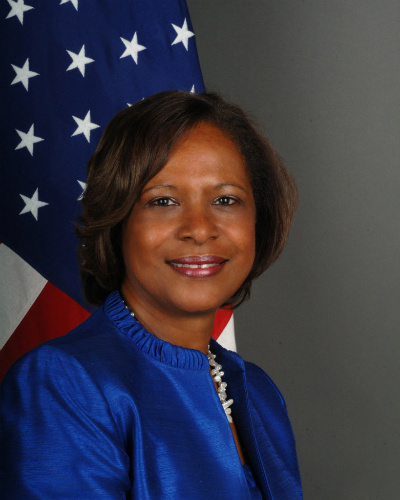

United States Ambassador to Jamaica
- In office November 3, 2010 – November 25, 2013
- President: Barack Obama
- Preceded by: Sue McCourt Cobb
- Succeeded by: Luis G. Moreno

United States Ambassador to Ghana
- In office October 11, 2005 – June 10, 2008
- President: George W. Bush
- Preceded by: Mary Carlin Yates
- Succeeded by: Donald G. Teitelbaum

United States Ambassador to Benin
- In office November 24, 2000 – December 10, 2002
- President: George W. Bush
- Preceded by: Robert C. Felder
- Succeeded by: Wayne E. Neill

Personal details
- Born: April 14, 1947 (age 79) Fredericksburg, Virginia
- Spouse: A. Russell Awkard
- Education: Virginia State University; University of Cincinnati
- Occupation: Ambassador, professor

Pamela E. Bridgewater (born April 14, 1947) is an American career diplomat and writer who served as the U.S. ambassador to Benin, Ghana, and most recently Jamaica.

== Early life and career ==
Bridgewater was born in Fredericksburg, Virginia, the daughter of a bank teller and a jazz trumpeter, and attended Walker-Grant High School.

Bridgewater has two degrees in Political Science, graduating with a bachelor of arts degree from Virginia State University in Ettrick, Virginia, in 1968, and with a master of arts degree from the University of Cincinnati in Ohio. Her career was initially in teaching, working at Maryland universities Morgan State and Bowie State, and Voorhees College in South Carolina, before entering the U.S. Foreign Service in 1980.

== Diplomacy ==
Between 1980 and 1990 Bridgewater was posted as Vice-Consul to Brussels, Belgium, and as Labor Attaché/Political Officer in Kingston, Jamaica. At the United States Department of State, Bridgewater was the longest-serving diplomat in South Africa, posted as Political Officer at Pretoria from 1990 to 1993, and as the first African-American woman appointed Consul General at Durban, from 1993 to 1996. Here she worked with Nelson Mandela during the transition of South Africa away from apartheid and visited women’s leader Nokukhanya Bhengu, widow of Albert Luthuli.

From 1996 to 1999, Bridgewater was Deputy Chief of Mission in Nassau, Bahamas. She was a member and president of the 42nd Senior Seminar, the U.S. Department of State's most prestigious professional development program, from 1999 to 2000, before serving as United States Ambassador to Benin from November 24, 2000 to December 10, 2002. Subsequently, Bridgewater was appointed U.S. deputy assistant secretary for African Affairs in December 2002, where she managed the State Department's Bureau of African Affairs' relationships with 16 countries in West Africa. In this period, she was named Special Coordinator for Peace in Liberia, during the Second Liberian Civil War.

Bridgewater served as Diplomat-in-Residence at Howard University in Washington, D.C., from September 2004 to May 2005. She encouraged diversity in the Foreign Service in the role.

From October 11, 2005, to June 10, 2008, Bridgewater was the United States Ambassador to Ghana, and from November 3, 2010, to November 25, 2013, she served as the United States Ambassador to Jamaica.

== Writing ==
In 2019, Bridgewater released Neutral on nothing, The Social Activism of Reverend B. H. Hester, about her grandfather, a social activist and the eighth pastor of Shiloh Baptist Church.

In 2025, Bridgewater released the memoir Bridging Troubled Waters about her life and diplomatic career.

== Personal life ==
Bridgewater is married to the Rev Dr. A. Russell Awkard, pastor of the New Zion Baptist Church, Louisville, Kentucky.

== Recognition ==
- Department of State Superior Honor Awards (3)
- Presidential Meritorious Service Award
- Honorary doctorate of laws from Virginia State University in 1997
- National Order of Benin in 2002
- Charles E. Cobb Jr. Award for Initiative and Success in Trade Development in 2002
- Dominion Resources Strong Leaders Award 2004
- Honorary doctorate of laws from the University of Cincinnati in 2006
- Honorary doctorate from the University of Mary Washington in 2015
- Girl Scouts of Virginia Lifetime Achievement Award

Diplomatic posts
Preceded by Robert C. Felder	United States Ambassador to Benin; 2000–2002	Succeeded by Wayne E. Neill
Preceded by Mary Carlin Yates	United States Ambassador to Ghana; 2005–2008	Succeeded by Donald G. Teitelbaum
Preceded by Sue M. Cobb	United States Ambassador to Jamaica; 2010–2013	Succeeded by Luis G. Moreno
