= John F. Hicks =

American diplomat

United States Ambassador to Eritrea
- In office September 29, 1996 – May 11, 1997
- President: Bill Clinton
- Preceded by: Robert Gordon Houdek
- Succeeded by: William Davis Clarke

Assistant Administrator of the United States Agency for International Development for Africa
- In office 1993–1996
- President: Bill Clinton

Personal details
- Born: 1949 (age 76–77)
- Died: August 28, 2021
- Education: Morehouse College; Johns Hopkins University
- Profession: Diplomat

John F. Hicks (born 1949, Goldsboro, North Carolina) was the American Ambassador to Eritrea (1996–1997) who resigned after a State Department investigation revealed he engaged in sexual misconduct.

Hicks became Georgia State University’s Associate Provost for International Affairs in 1998.

== Education & Career ==
Hicks earned a bachelor’s degree in Political Science from Morehouse College, a diploma and master’s degree from Johns Hopkins University in Bologna, Italy and Washington, D.C.

A career member of the senior foreign service, Hicks was appointed as the Assistant Administrator of the United States Agency for International Development for the African Bureau in 1993.

== Sexual misconduct allegations ==
Hicks stepped down from his ambassadorship three weeks after Secretary of State Madeleine Albright received the Inspector General report. Based on allegations made by two Embassy employees, Hicks "violated standards for continued employment ... in that (he) clearly showed poor judgment and lack of discretion. ... Ambassador Hicks' behavior was both severe and pervasive in creating a hostile work environment for these women. It was unwelcomed, repeated, unsolicited and clearly of a sexual nature." Hicks claimed subordinates instigated the investigation in an attempt to ruin his career.
