= Jerry P. Lanier =

American diplomat (1952–2022)

Jerry Lanier
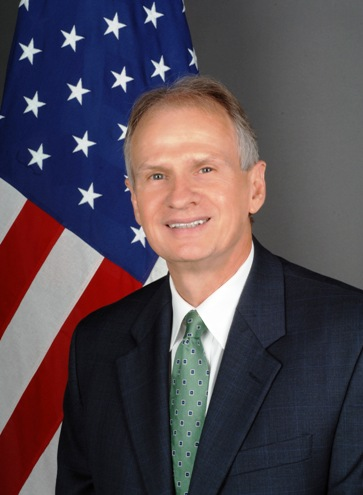

United States Ambassador to Sudan
- Acting
- In office May 13, 2014 – February 26, 2016
- President: Barack Obama; Donald Trump
- Preceded by: Joseph Stafford (Acting)
- Succeeded by: Steven Koutsis (Acting)

Coordinator for Counterterrorism
- Acting
- In office December 12, 2012 – February 18, 2014
- President: Barack Obama
- Preceded by: Daniel Benjamin
- Succeeded by: Tina Kaidanow

United States Ambassador to Uganda
- In office January 24, 2010 – June 11, 2012
- President: Barack Obama
- Preceded by: Steven A. Browning
- Succeeded by: Scott H. DeLisi

Personal details
- Born: January 19, 1952 Chadbourn, North Carolina, U.S.
- Died: August 16, 2022 (aged 70) Charleston, South Carolina, U.S.
- Education: University of North Carolina, Pembroke; University of North Carolina, Chapel Hill

Jerry P. Lanier (January 19, 1952 – August 16, 2022) He was a career diplomat with the Department of State. Lanier was a former acting U.S. Ambassador to Sudan. He was in this position from May 13, 2014 to February 26, 2016. He was the Acting Coordinator for Counterterrorism in the Bureau of Counterterrorism, at the Department of State from December 2012 to February 2014. He was a former Ambassador from the United States of America to the Republic of Uganda.

== Career ==
A career diplomat, Jerry P. Lanier held numerous positions within the State Department prior to assignment in Kampala. Lanier joined the State Department in 1983, and his first assignment was to Embassy of the United States of America to the Republic of the Philippines in Manila. From 1986 to 1989 he served as a Political Officer in Kenya, and then traveled to Washington, D.C. to serve as Special Assistant to Assistant Secretary for African Affairs. From 1990 to 1992 he served as Desk Officer for the Republic of Korea, before transferring to Bangkok, Thailand from 1993 to 1997. He spent several years back in Washington, D.C. services as Deputy Director for the Office of West African Affairs and as a Legislative Management Officer for Africa.

From 2001 to 2002 he worked out of Eagle Base in Tuzla, Bosnia as a Political Advisor to the Commander of U.S. forces. From 2002 to 2003 he was Deputy Director for the Office of Pakistan, Afghanistan, and Bangladesh Affairs. From 2003 to 2006 he was the Deputy Chief of Mission to the United States Embassy in Accra, Ghana, and was later Director of the Office of Regional and Security Affairs in the Bureau of African Affairs (AF/RSA), which coordinates security, counterterrorism and peacekeeping operations in Africa. He joined as a Foreign Policy Advisor to United States Africa Command in Stuttgart, Germany in 2007.

Diplomatic posts
Preceded by Steven A. Browning	United States Ambassador to Uganda; 2010–2012	Succeeded by Scott H. DeLisi
Preceded by Daniel Benjamin	Coordinator for Counterterrorism; Acting; 2012–2014	Succeeded by Tina Kaidanow
Preceded by Joseph D. Stafford; Acting	United States Ambassador to Sudan; Acting; 2014–2016	Succeeded by Steven Koutsis; Acting
