= Thomas S. Estes =

American diplomat

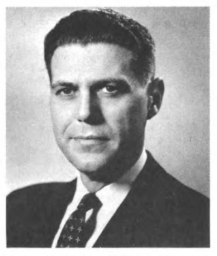
- Grave at Arlington National Cemetery

2nd United States Ambassador to Burkina Faso
- In office June 26, 1961 – July 13, 1966
- President: John F. Kennedy
- Preceded by: R. Borden Reams
- Succeeded by: Elliott P. Skinner

Personal details
- Born: January 23, 1913 Rumford, Maine, US
- Died: December 29, 2001 (aged 88) Bradenton, Florida, US
- Profession: Diplomat

Thomas Stuart Estes (January 23, 1913 – December 29, 2001) was an American diplomat. He was the United States Ambassador to Upper Volta (now Burkina Faso) from 1961 to 1966. He was the first ambassador solely accredited to Upper Volta.

== Biography ==
Thomas Estes was born on January 23, 1913, in Rumford, Oxford County, Maine.

=== Early years in Worcester, Massachusetts ===
At age 16, Estes left Maine, and his childhood sweetheart Ruth Fullerton, to live and work with his aunt and uncle Fanny and Joseph Coombs in Worcester, Massachusetts. His uncle was the owner of an interior decorating and furniture business during the Great Depression. While in Worcester, he met Dorothy Astrid Forsstedt, who would later become his wife.

=== 1934 Enlistment in the Marines and Beijing ===
In 1934 Estes enlisted in the U.S. Marines. In 1936 Tom graduated the Marines Clerical School and in 1937 was assigned to the American Embassy in Beijing, China.

=== Foreign service in Siam ===
In early 1938 Estes received an honorable discharge from the Marines to join the United States Foreign Service as a clerk and was assigned to the legation in Bangkok, Thailand under American Minister Edwin L. Neville and Holbrook "Chappy" Chapman. In Bangkok Estes was promoted to Vice Consul. While in Thailand Estes married Dorothy Forsstedt on December 13, 1938, in the Episcopal Church in Bangkok. Dorothy then began work at the Legation as a clerk.

In October 1941 Japanese invasion of Thailand. Estes and other members of the legation were interned in with the Japanese soldiers guarding the gates for some time. On July 3, 1942, the legation staff was finally to be exchanged in repatriation on the Japanese liner. On July 12, 1941, at Lourenço Marques in Portuguese Mozambique (now Maputo in Mozambique) they were exchanged and transferred to the American ocean liner MS Gripsholm.

==== 1942 assigned to Algiers ====
August 25, 1942, Estes and family arrived in Washington. In Washington Estes received word that he had passed his written exams for the Foreign Service, was given his oral exams and passed. Estes was assigned to Ambassador Robert Murphy at the Office of the U.S. Political Advisor to General Eisenhower in the Allied Forces Headquarters (AFHQ), Algiers, Africa. Holbrook "Chappy" Chapman (from Bangkok) posted there as well. During this time Estes participated in the inspection of POW camps by the Swiss and was designated a "Special Naturalization Examiner." The duty of the Examiner was to naturalize Army soldiers that were not American citizens. Naturalization ceremonies took place in many dangerous places – such as the Anzio beach head.

Dorothy gave birth to a daughter, Elisabeth, in Oran, French Algeria, in April 1944.

==== 1944 Caserta Italy ====
A little later it was decided to transfer Allied Force Headquarters from Algiers to Caserta, Italy, a few miles north of Naples and so began a road trip to Italy in the Studebaker. In May 1944 Estes was involved in the exchange of German prisoners in Algiers.

==== 1945 Bronze Star ====
In August 1945 Estes was awarded the Army's Bronze Star for his Naturalization work on the Anzio beachhead.

==== 1945 Meeting the Pope on the way to Salzburg Austria ====
About that time Estes received orders to transfer to Salzburg, Austria. At a stopover in Rome, Estes was invited to an all-priests luncheon by the American Monsignor whom Estes had met in Algiers. At the luncheon the Monsignor announced that the Pope wanted to meet with Estes the next morning. At the meeting the Pope emphasized his deep affection for the Austrian people. He hoped the U.S. would do everything possible to restore their freedom and peaceful existence.

Several months later Estes became eligible for home leave – two months back in the US. The family traveled in the Studebaker to Hamburg, driving through Germany.

==== 1946 Quebec ====
At the end of this vacation Estes was told that he was to attend the Harvard Business School's three-month Advanced Management Program. In the meantime Estes was assigned to the Consulate in Quebec. The Studebaker had arrived back in the US and the family headed to Quebec. The family, and furnishings from Vienna arrived in Quebec several days later and the family settled into an apartment near the Consulate. Duties in Quebec involved issuing visas and certifying citizenship for young couples coming to Quebec to adopt children via the "Le Creche" organization. While in Quebec Estes met the former Queen Sophia of the Austrian-Hungarian Empire who was living in a Roman Catholic convent.

==== 1950 State Department ====
In 1950 Estes was relocated back to Washington and posted to the State Department to handle assignments of staff to several countries in Europe. During this time Estes began a long road to a college degree by taking classes at American University. In September 1951 Estes' wife gave birth to a son, Stuart, in the Seventh Day Adventist hospital in Silver Springs Maryland.

Estes attended the Harvard Business School program. After graduation Estes was posted to Athens, Greece to become the Second Director of the Joint Administrative Service (JAS) supporting the effort of the several agencies that were involved in restoring economic stability to Greece. He traveled to Greece aboard the USS Constitution from New York with his family.

The JAS was directly or indirectly supported by AID - an economic and military assistance program designed to block the advance of Communism. Duties in Athens ranged from Personnel to Accounting to Payroll issues. Payroll was changed from Drachma's to checks. The payroll in drachmas filled two large suitcase was difficult to secure, count and manage.

Estes performed inspection tours in areas where the U.S. was engaged in active projects to help restore the Greek economy and to preclude Communist infiltration and obstruction to the AID efforts.

After Athens Estes returned to the US in 1956 and was appointed Deputy Assistant Secretary of State at the State Department. His duties were to reorganize the General Service Office provided logistical support for the Department and its domestic and foreign offices. Tom reorganized the office into two major divisions and an executive staff. Previously the units of the organization had operated semi-autonomously for a long period of time and did not readily take to being part of a centrally directed organization. However over time the reorganization worked and essentially the same broad system of doing business is still in use today. Estes was also instrumental in the design of the new State Department building and proposed that the offices and floors be arranged in a way that reflected the tenants rank within the department.

Estes and his wife Dorothy divorced in 1957. In 1958 Estes married Ruth Fullerton in Maine.

On January 1, 1957, a time capsule for the State Department was filled with a newspaper, coins and other pertinent documents by Secretary of State John Foster Dulles, Deputy Under Secretary Loy Henderson, and Estes.

=== Ambassador to Upper Volta ===
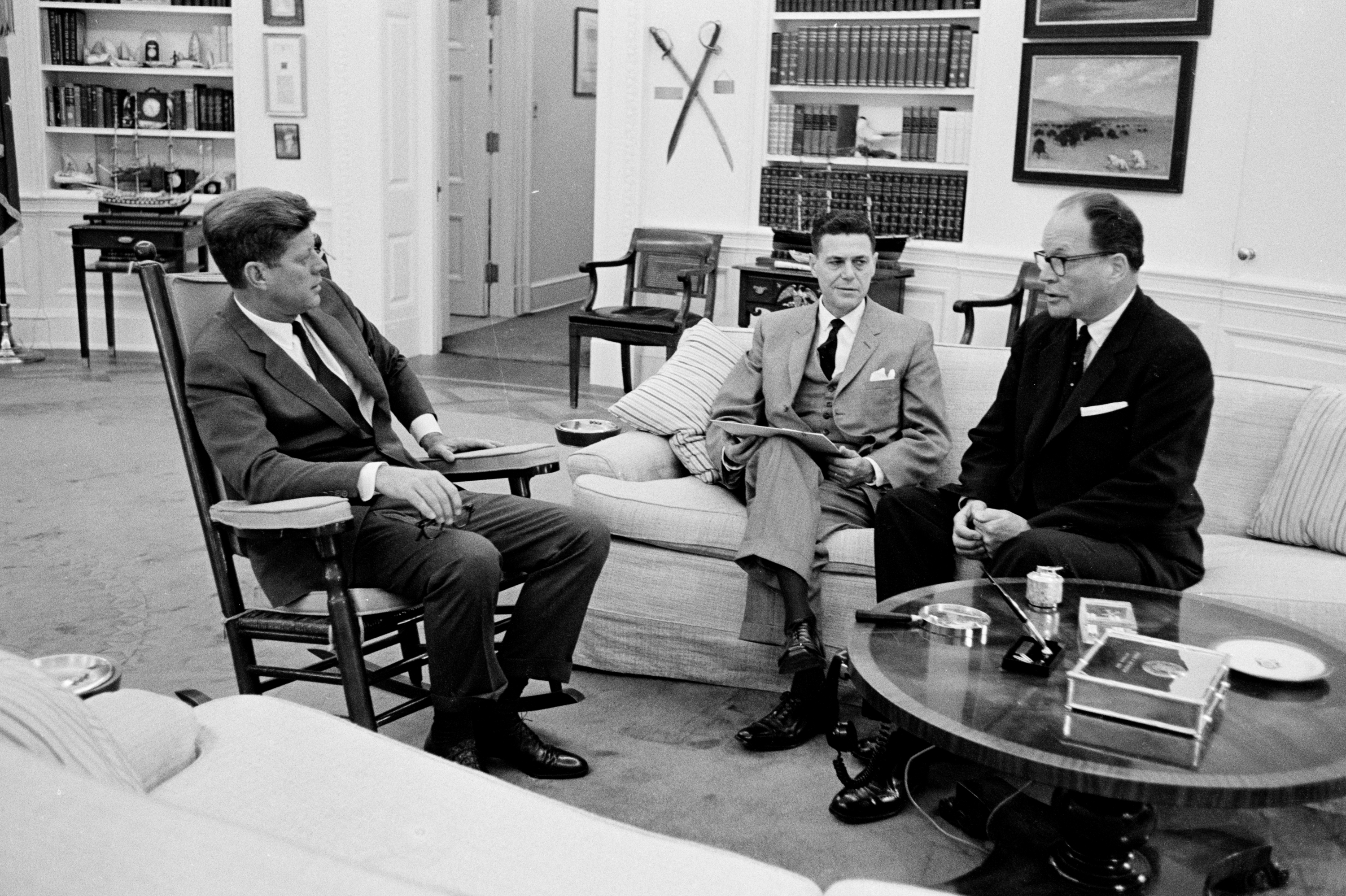
Estes meeting with President John F. Kennedy and Charles Darlington on November 21, 1963

In 1961 Estes was nominated as United States Ambassador to Upper Volta by President John F. Kennedy and was confirmed by the Senate. He oversaw smallpox and measles vaccination in the region, Upper Volta's recognition of the Taiwan, and U.S. support and interest in the region. On November 21, 1963, Estes and Charles Darlington were the last White House appointments before Kennedy's assassination the next day in Texas.

Estes and Ruth adopted a daughter, Jane, while in Upper Volta in 1965. That same year his daughter Betsy gave birth to Dean, Estes' first grandchild.

He left the post in Upper Volta on July 13, 1966, and for two years Estes served as the State Department Advisor to the Naval War College in Newport, Rhode Island. Estes retired from the Foreign Service in 1969 in Newport.

==== 1973 college diploma ====
In 1973 Estes received the college diploma, a bachelor's in Political Science from the University of Rhode Island.

==== 1983 Japan-America Society and the Black Ships Festival ====
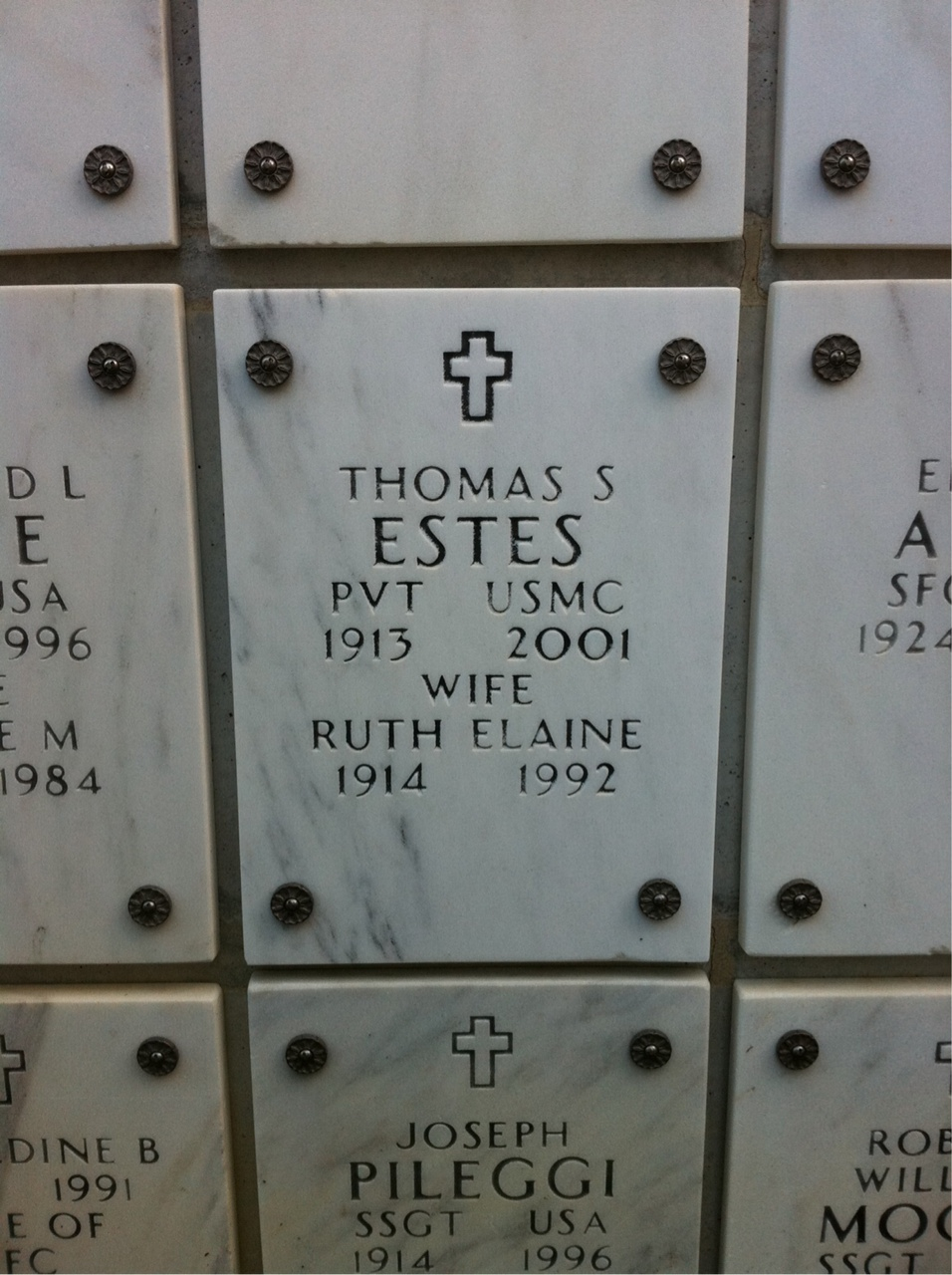
Grave at Arlington National Cemetery

Estes served as the President of the Japan-America Society, which oversaw the Black Ships Festival, which celebrates Commodore Perry's first arrival, in black ships, in Shimoda, Japan in 1854 that opened western trade after years of self-imposed isolation. Newport's sister city in Japan is Shimoda and in 1984 Estes was instrumental in getting the very first Black Ships Festival in Newport off the ground. The festival has been an annual event in Newport ever since.

=== Death ===
On December 29, 2001, Estes died of congestive heart failure in the Freedom Village Nursing Center in Bradenton, Manatee County, Florida. He was aged 88 years, 340 days. He is buried at the Arlington National Cemetery in Arlington, Virginia.

Diplomatic posts
Preceded by R. Borden Reams	United States Ambassador to Burkina Faso; 1961–1966	Succeeded by Elliott P. Skinner
