= George Moose =

American diplomat (born 1944)

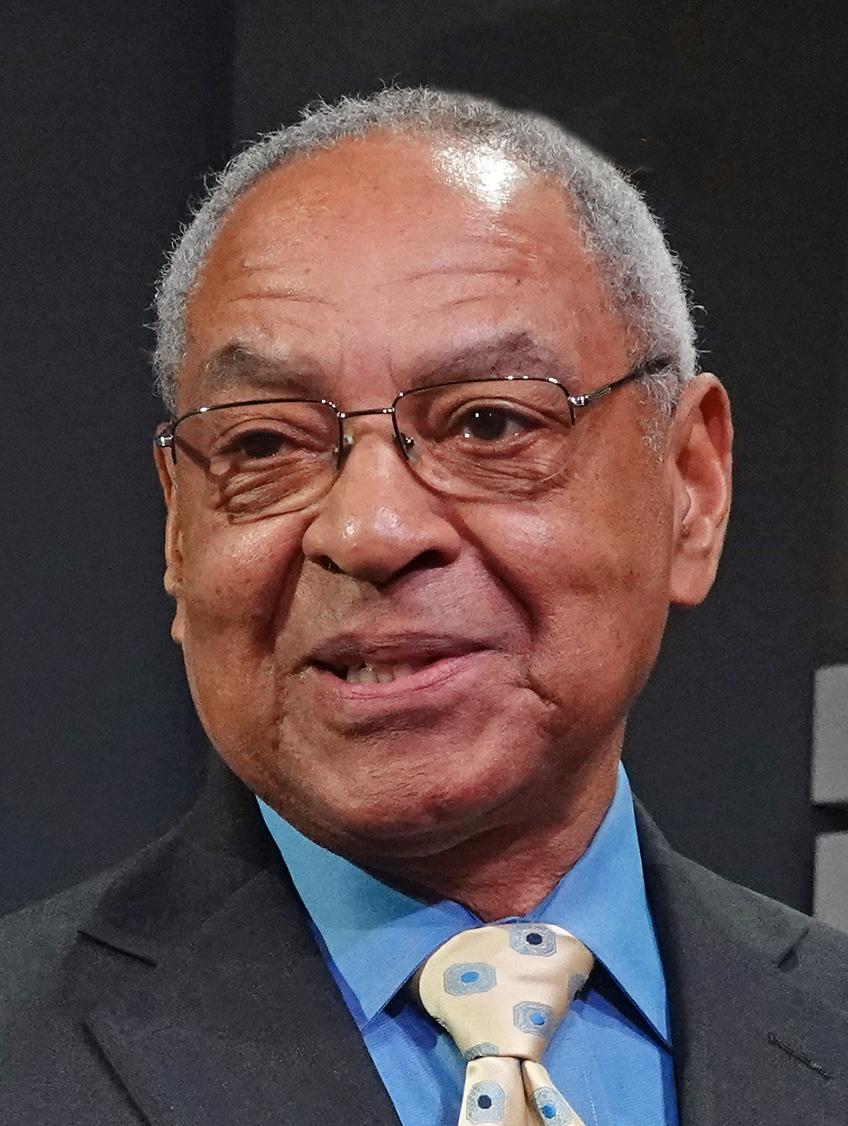

United States Representative to the United Nations in Geneva
- In office November 18, 1997 – May 31, 2001
- President: Bill Clinton; George W. Bush
- Preceded by: Daniel Spiegel
- Succeeded by: James Foley

11th Assistant Secretary of State for African Affairs
- In office April 2, 1993 – August 22, 1997
- President: Bill Clinton
- Preceded by: Hank Cohen
- Succeeded by: Susan Rice

United States Ambassador to Senegal
- In office October 13, 1988 – May 21, 1991
- President: Ronald Reagan; George H. W. Bush
- Preceded by: Lannon Walker
- Succeeded by: Katherine Shirley

United States Ambassador to Benin
- In office November 4, 1983 – July 7, 1986
- President: Ronald Reagan
- Preceded by: James B. Engle
- Succeeded by: Walter Stadtler

Personal details
- Born: George Edward Moose; June 23, 1944 (age 82) New York City, New York, U.S.
- Education: Grinnell College (BA); Syracuse University

George Edward Moose (born June 23, 1944) is an American diplomat who served as the chair of the board of directors of the United States Institute of Peace from 2021-2025. He formerly served as Assistant Secretary of State for African Affairs from 1993 to 1997, Representative to the United Nations in Geneva from 1997 to 2001, and as Ambassador to the Republics of Benin and Senegal in the 1980s and 1990s. He is primarily known for serving as Assistant Secretary of State for African Affairs in the Clinton Administration during the Rwandan genocide.

Moose was fired as CEO and removed from the USIP board on 14 March 2025 by the Trump administration. The reason cited was noncompliance with a recent executive order on repurposing federally-supported foreign assistance.

== Biography ==
George Moose was born in New York City in 1944 and was raised in Denver, Colorado. He earned a degree from Grinnell College and attended the Maxwell School of Syracuse University before entering the Foreign Service in 1967.

Secretary Moose headed the American delegation which participated in the first Tokyo International Conference on African Development in October 1993.

In 2002 he was promoted to the rank of Career Ambassador.

Moose was fired as CEO and removed as president of the US Institute of Peace (USIP) board on 14 March 2025 as part of efforts by the Trump administration to redirect or terminate federally‑supported foreign assistance programs. White House spokesperson Anna Kelly cited USIP's "noncompliance" with a recent executive order from president Trump as the reason for his dismissal. Kelly said "Rogue bureaucrats will not be allowed to hold agencies hostage. The Trump administration will enforce the president's executive authority and ensure his agencies remain accountable to the American people." Moose vowed legal action, saying that "What has happened here today is an illegal takeover by elements of the executive branch of a private non-profit". On May 19, 2025 the action was declared illegal and null and void.

Diplomatic posts
Preceded by James B. Engle	U.S. Ambassador to Benin; 1983–1986	Succeeded by Walter Stadtler
Preceded by Lannon Walker	U.S. Ambassador to Senegal; 1988–1991	Succeeded by Katherine Shirley
Preceded by Daniel Spiegel	U.S. Representative to United Nations in Geneva; 1997–2001	Succeeded by James Foley
Political offices
Preceded by Hank Cohen	Assistant Secretary of State for African Affairs; 1993–1997	Succeeded by Susan Rice
