= Scott H. DeLisi =

American diplomat (born 1953)

Scott DeLisi
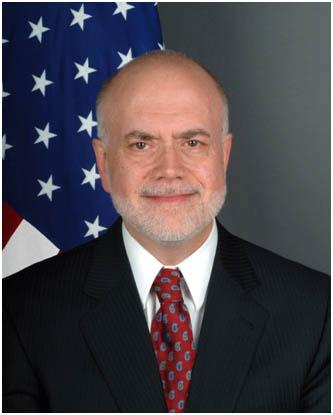

United States Ambassador to Uganda
- In office September 3, 2012 – September 18, 2015
- President: Barack Obama
- Preceded by: Jerry Lanier
- Succeeded by: Patricia Mahoney (Acting)

United States Ambassador to Nepal
- In office June 14, 2010 – June 24, 2012
- President: Barack Obama
- Preceded by: Nancy Powell
- Succeeded by: Peter Bodde

United States Ambassador to Eritrea
- In office October 21, 2004 – June 2, 2007
- President: George W. Bush
- Preceded by: Donald McConnell
- Succeeded by: Ronald McMullen

Personal details
- Born: 1953 (age 72–73) Saint Paul, Minnesota, U.S.
- Education: University of Minnesota

Scott H. DeLisi (born 1953) is the former United States Ambassador to Uganda. On January 24, 2012, President Obama nominated DeLisi as ambassador to Uganda.

== Career ==
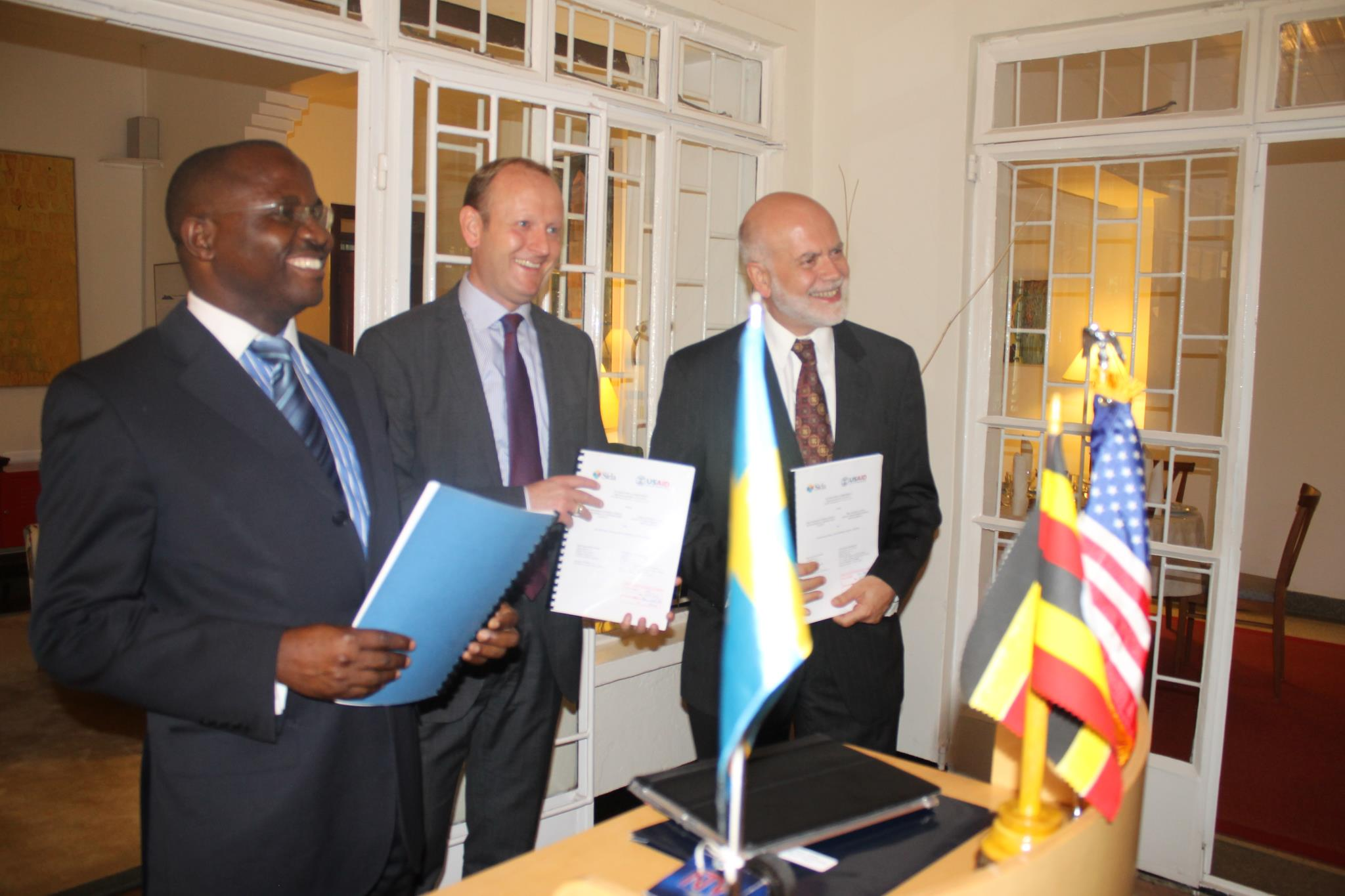
DeLisi meeting with H.E. Urban Andersson and Fabian Kasi in 2012

A career foreign service officer, DeLisi was previously United States Ambassador to Nepal and Eritrea and Deputy Chief of Mission of the American Embassy in Botswana. He also served in India, Madagascar, Pakistan, and Sri Lanka as well as various postings in Washington D.C. Ambassador DeLisi is a graduate of the University of Minnesota and the University of Minnesota Law School. A native of Minnesota, DeLisi speaks French and Urdu.

Diplomatic posts
Preceded by Donald McConnell	United States Ambassador to Eritrea; 2004–2007	Succeeded by Ronald McMullen
Preceded by Nancy Powell	United States Ambassador to Nepal; 2010–2012	Succeeded by Peter Bodde
Preceded by Jerry Lanier	United States Ambassador to Uganda; 2012–2015	Succeeded by Patricia Mahoney; Acting
