= Robert Anderson (diplomat) =

American Foreign Service officer (1922–1996)

United States Ambassador to the Dominican Republic
- In office June 22, 1982 – August 3, 1985
- President: Ronald Reagan
- Preceded by: Robert L. Yost
- Succeeded by: Lowell C. Kilday

United States Ambassador to Morocco
- In office 1976–1978
- President: Gerald Ford
- Preceded by: Robert G. Neumann
- Succeeded by: Richard B. Parker

United States Ambassador to Benin
- In office 1972–1974
- President: Richard Nixon; Gerald Ford
- Preceded by: Matthew J. Looram, Jr.
- Succeeded by: James B. Engle

6th Spokesperson for the United States Department of State
- In office 1974–1976
- Preceded by: Carl E. Bartch
- Succeeded by: Hodding Carter III

Personal details
- Born: January 6, 1922 Boston, Massachusetts, U.S.
- Died: April 5, 1996 (aged 74) Fairfax, Virginia, U.S.
- Education: Yale University (BA)

Military service
- Branch/service: United States Army
- Battles/wars: World War II

Robert Anderson (January 6, 1922 – April 5, 1996) was an American diplomat who served as the United States Ambassador to Dahomey, Morocco, and the Dominican Republic.

== Early life and education ==
Anderson was born in Boston, Massachusetts. After graduating from Yale University, he served as a first lieutenant in the United States Army during World War II.

== Career ==
Anderson joined the Foreign Service after the war, and served in consular positions during the 1950s and 1960s, before being appointed U.S. ambassador to Dahomey (Benin) in 1972. He served as ambassador to Dahomey from 1972 to 1974, to Morocco from 1976 to 1978, and the Dominican Republic from 1982 to 1985. In the 1970s, Anderson also served as an assistant and spokesman for Henry Kissinger.

== Death ==
Anderson died of congestive heart failure at Fairfax Hospital in Fairfax, Virginia, at the age of 74. At the time of his death, he was a resident of Georgetown.

Diplomatic posts
| Preceded by Robert L. Yost | United States Ambassador to the Dominican Republic; 1982–1985 | Succeeded by Lowell C. Kilday |
| Preceded by Matthew J. Looram, Jr. | United States Ambassador to Benin; 1972–1974 | Succeeded by James B. Engle |
| Preceded by Robert G. Neumann | United States Ambassador to Morocco; 1976–1978 | Succeeded by Richard B. Parker |
