= Jeanine E. Jackson =

American diplomat (born 1949)

Jeanine Jackson
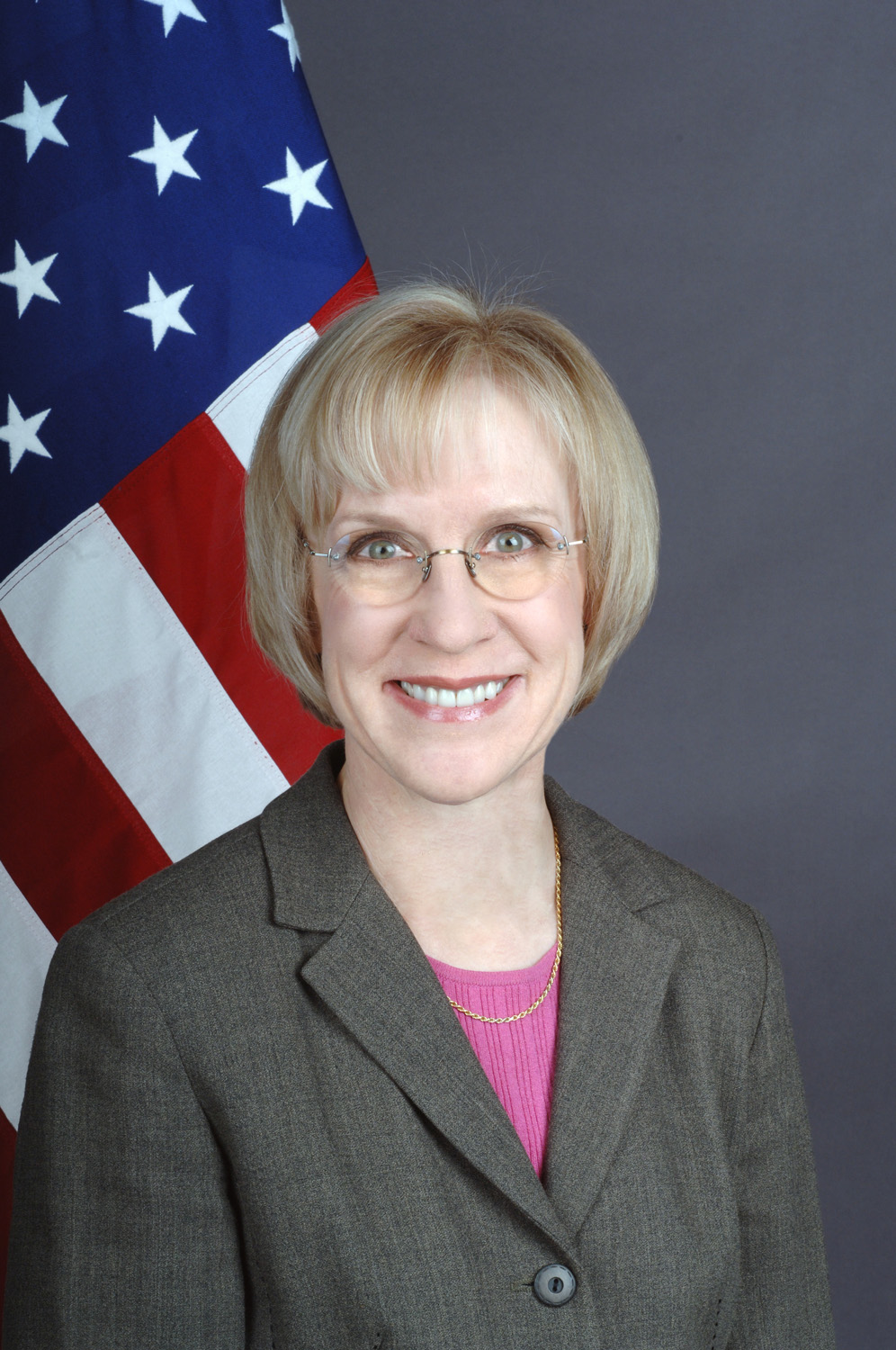
- Official portrait, 2005

17th United States Ambassador to Malawi
- In office October 20, 2011 – September 25, 2014
- President: Barack Obama
- Preceded by: Peter W. Bodde
- Succeeded by: Virginia E. Palmer

16th United States Ambassador to Burkina Faso
- In office March 24, 2006 – March 7, 2009
- President: George W. Bush
- Preceded by: J. Anthony Holmes
- Succeeded by: Gayleatha B. Brown

Personal details
- Born: 1949 (age 76–77) Sheridan, Wyoming, U.S.
- Spouse: Mark Jackson
- Profession: Diplomat

Jeanine E. Jackson (born 1949) is an American diplomat. She was the ambassador to Burkina Faso from 2006 to 2009 and to the Republic of Malawi from 2011 to 2014.

== Life ==
Jeanine Jackson was born in Wyoming. She is of European descent, and graduated from Hastings College with a BA in Art Education in 1971, and the Florida Institute of Technology with an MBA.

== Career ==
Prior to entering the U.S. Foreign Service, Jackson worked in Saigon, Vietnam, as a civil service employee at the Defense Attaché Office. She also served for 10 years as an active duty U.S. Army officer as a colonel, and served primarily in West Germany and South Korea, before retiring and joining the reserves. She joined the Foreign Service in 1985, and saw prominent roles such as Post Management Officer to the USSR (1991), Personnel Officer to Hong Kong (1997), Supervisory General Services Officer to Kenya (1998), Deputy Chief of Mission to Afghanistan (2001–2003), Coordinator for Iraq Transition (2004–2006), amidst others. As Minister Counselor for Management at the U.S. Embassy in Baghdad, she supported the transition from a military-oriented U.S. presence to a more civilian one. In that role she found it necessary to deal with funding shortages and uncertainty. Jackson retired as a colonel from the Army reserve in 2006. She was appointed as United States Ambassador to Burkina Faso by George W. Bush in 2006, where she achieved a bilateral agreement with the state that enabled U.S. Special Operations Command to regularize and accelerate its counter-terrorism work against Al Qaeda in that region, and remained in that post until 2009.

President Barack Obama nominated Jackson as United States Ambassador to Malawi, and she was then confirmed by Congress on June 30, 2011. She ended her post in Malawi in 2014 and used the opportunity to highlight the US Skills Training programs and commend the Malawi government for its peace-keeping mission in the Democratic Republic of the Congo. She served as ambassador to Malawi during the administration of Malawi President Joyce Banda and witnessed the progress the country made under her leadership in establishing greater gender equality. In an interview Jackson compared Malawi to the U.S. in terms of women's participation in government: "I note that there is a greater percentage of women in the Malawian Parliament than in the U.S. Congress."

Jackson received the Secretary of State's Distinguished Honor Award for her work in the U.S. Embassy in Baghdad.

== Personal ==
Jackson is married. She and her husband, Mark, a retired Foreign Service Officer, served together in Nigeria and Saudi Arabia.

Diplomatic posts
Preceded by J. Anthony Holmes	United States Ambassador to Burkina Faso; 2006–2009	Succeeded by Gayleatha B. Brown
