= Joseph P. O'Neill =

- Occupation: Politician

Joseph P. O'Neill (born July 18, 1947) is a veteran American Democratic Party strategist in Washington, D.C. He is president and CEO of Public Strategies Washington, Inc. (PSW), an independently owned public affairs firm. Former White House Press Secretary Mike McCurry is a partner at the firm.

== Personal life and education ==
Born in Boston, Massachusetts, O'Neill received his Bachelor of Arts degree in Government from Harvard College in 1969 and his Masters in Public Affairs from the Lyndon B. Johnson School of Public Affairs at the University of Texas at Austin in 1973. He served on the faculty of the LBJ School of Public Affairs from 1973 to 1975. O'Neill and his wife Linda reside in Bethesda, Maryland. They have three children, Susannah, Patrick and Kathleen.

== Career ==
O'Neill founded Public Strategies Washington, Inc. in 1991, and has worked with a number of corporations, trade associations, and government entities on a wide range of issues, including tax policy, health care, defense and financial services.

Prior to founding PSW, O'Neill was President of the National Retail Federation (NRF), one of the country's largest industry trade associations.

In his public career, O'Neill is most closely associated with former U.S. Senator and Treasury Secretary, Lloyd Bentsen, serving as his chief of staff in the U.S. Senate from 1980 to 1985 and as campaign manager and chief of staff for Bentsen in the Dukakis-Bentsen presidential campaign of 1988. O'Neill also served as head of transition for Senator Bentsen subsequent to his selection by President Bill Clinton in 1992 as the country's 69th Secretary of the Treasury.

O'Neill was named UT Austin's 2016 Outstanding Alumnus, an award recognizing an alumnus/a of the Graduate School for academic or professional achievements since graduating from the university. O’Neill was honored at the Graduate School’s Convocation on Saturday, May 21, 2016. LBJ School Dean Angela Evans noted, “Joe has sought excellence at every step of his career and the School and the university are fortunate to have such a dedicated partner as a key leader in our alumni community. Even with such an outstanding background, Joe remains one of the most modest, kind, and service-oriented individuals with whom I have had the pleasure to work. We congratulate him on this prestigious award and well-deserved recognition.”

== Board affiliations ==
O'Neill has served on a variety of corporate boards, including serving as lead director for Dallas-based Affiliated Computer Services prior to its acquisition by Xerox for $6.4 billion in 2009. O'Neill also served on the board of CareerStaff Unlimited and serves on the boards of Supplemental Health Care Inc, T-Rex Services, and the U.S. Chamber of Commerce Foundation. O'Neill also serves as chairman of the advisory board for the Lyndon B. Johnson School of Public Affairs, which launched a Washington Center.
