= List of ambassadors of the United States to Burkina Faso =

Ambassador of the United States to Burkina Faso
- Seal of the United States Department of State

- Flag of a United States ambassador

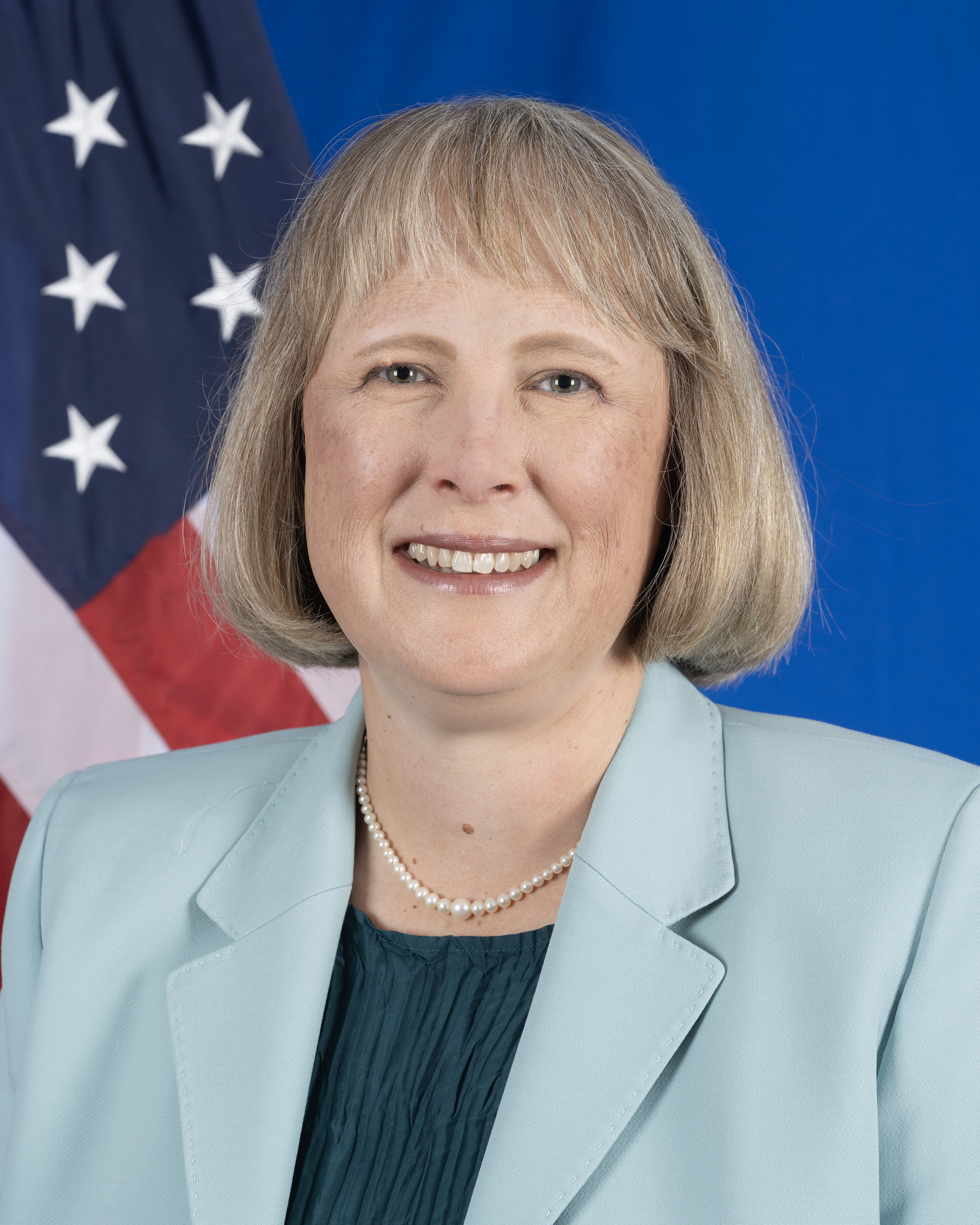
- Incumbent; Joann M. Lockard since June 28, 2024
- Nominator: The president of the United States
- Appointer: The president with Senate advice and consent
- Inaugural holder: R. Borden Reams as Ambassador Extraordinary and Plenipotentiary
- Formation: October 17, 1960
- Website: U.S. Embassy - Ouagadougou

This is a list of ambassadors of the United States to Burkina Faso (formerly Upper Volta).

Until 1960 Upper Volta was a French possession as a part of French West Africa. In 1958 Upper Volta became an autonomous republic in the French Community (Communauté française), and achieved independence as the Republic of Upper Volta on August 5, 1960.

The United States recognized Upper Volta immediately and assigned its first envoy on the nation's independence day, August 5. The envoy, Donald R. Norland, had presented his credentials as Chargé d'Affaires ad interim on the previous day, August 4, to take effect on the day of independence. Norland was also the Chargé d'Affaires a.i. to the newly independent nations: Ivory Coast (Côte d'Ivoire), Dahomey (Benin) and Niger while resident in Abidjan.

The first ranking ambassador, R. Borden Reams, was appointed October 17, 1960. He was also the ambassador to the aforementioned countries while resident in Abidjan. On December 31, 1960, an embassy was established in Ouagadougou with a resident Chargé d'affaires. On May 29, 1961, the first ambassador solely accredited to Upper Volta was appointed.

On August 4, 1984, the nation's name was changed to Burkina Faso.

The United States Embassy in Burkina Faso is located in Ouagadougou.

== Ambassadors ==
Name	Title	Appointed	Presented credentials	Terminated mission	Notes
R. Borden Reams– Career FSO	Ambassador Extraordinary and Plenipotentiary	October 17, 1960	December 6, 1960	June 26, 1961	
Thomas S. Estes – Career FSO	Ambassador Extraordinary and Plenipotentiary	May 29, 1961	June 26, 1961	July 13, 1966	
Elliott P. Skinner – political appointee	Ambassador Extraordinary and Plenipotentiary	May 27, 1966	September 14, 1966	July 16, 1969	
William E. Schaufele, Jr. – Career FSO	Ambassador Extraordinary and Plenipotentiary	September 29, 1969	October 16, 1969	July 10, 1971	
Donald B. Easum – Career FSO	Ambassador Extraordinary and Plenipotentiary	November 5, 1971	December 8, 1971	January 19, 1974	
Pierre R. Graham – Career FSO	Ambassador Extraordinary and Plenipotentiary	June 20, 1974	July 30, 1974	June 13, 1978	
Thomas D. Boyatt – Career FSO	Ambassador Extraordinary and Plenipotentiary	July 18, 1978	September 21, 1978	October 23, 1980	
Larry C. Grahl	Chargé d'affaires ad interim	October 23, 1980		November 18, 1981	
Julius Waring Walker, Jr. – Career FSO	Ambassador Extraordinary and Plenipotentiary	July 18, 1981	November 18, 1981	July 5, 1984	
Leonardo Neher – Career FSO	Ambassador Extraordinary and Plenipotentiary	June 28, 1984	September 21, 1984	August 1, 1987	
David H. Shinn – Career FSO	Ambassador Extraordinary and Plenipotentiary	November 6, 1987	November 28, 1987	August 6, 1990	
Edward P. Brynn – Career FSO	Ambassador Extraordinary and Plenipotentiary	October 22, 1990	January 14, 1991	April 17, 1993	
Donald J. McConnell – Career FSO	Ambassador Extraordinary and Plenipotentiary	August 9, 1993	November 22, 1993	June 4, 1996	
Sharon P. Wilkinson – Career FSO	Ambassador Extraordinary and Plenipotentiary	July 11, 1996	October 24, 1996	July 12, 1999	
Jimmy J. Kolker – Career FSO	Ambassador Extraordinary and Plenipotentiary	November 16, 1999	January 11, 2000	August 2, 2002	
J. Anthony Holmes – Career FSO	Ambassador Extraordinary and Plenipotentiary	October 3, 2002	December 23, 2002	July 9, 2005	
Jeanine E. Jackson – Career FSO	Ambassador Extraordinary and Plenipotentiary	February 21, 2006	March 24, 2006	March 7, 2009	
J. Thomas Dougherty – Career FSO	Ambassador Extraordinary and Plenipotentiary	August 5, 2010	September 30, 2010	September 30, 2013	
Tulinabo S. Mushingi - Career FSO	Ambassador Extraordinary and Plenipotentiary	July 9, 2013	September 17, 2013	October 27, 2016	
Andrew Robert Young - Career FSO	Ambassador Extraordinary and Plenipotentiary	September 28, 2016	November 20, 2016	March 26, 2020	
Sandra E. Clark - Career FSO	Ambassador Extraordinary and Plenipotentiary	August 12, 2020	September 25, 2020	December 18, 2023	
Eric Whitaker - Career FSO	Chargé d'affaires ad interim	December 19, 2023		June 27, 2024	
Joann M. Lockard - Career FSO	Ambassador Extraordinary and Plenipotentiary	May 2, 2024	June 28, 2024	Present	

== See also ==
- Ambassadors to Burkina Faso
- Burkina Faso – United States relations
- Foreign relations of Burkina Faso
- Ambassadors of the United States
