= Sue Bremner =

American diplomat

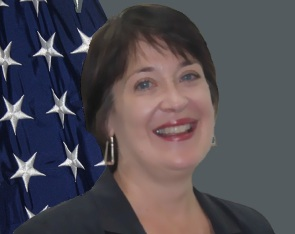
Sue Bremner as Chargé d’affaires to Eritrea

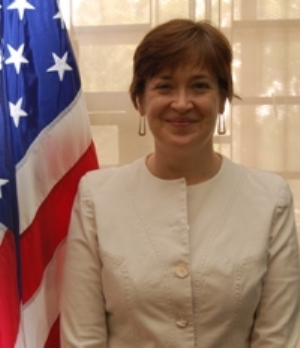
Sue Bremner during her tenure as Deputy chief of mission in N'Djamena, Chad.

Susan Lenore Bremner (born 1954) is an American diplomat who served as Chargé d’Affaires ad interim to Eritrea from July 2012 to April 2014., and Chargé d'Affaires ad interim to Chad during her tenure as Deputy chief of mission (DCM) from 2009 to 2011. She was with the State Department for 30 years, serving in Asia, Europe and Africa.

== Career ==
A native of Columbus, Ohio, Sue Bremner taught undergraduate English composition at University of California, Berkeley and Peking University in China before joining the U.S. Foreign Service in 1986, with her first overseas assignment in China. From 1990 to 1992, she worked as Desk Officer at the European Community Desk (now EU Desk), responsible for tracking European assistance to the former Soviet Union, and then served as Bosnia Desk Officer (1992–1994). In 1995, Bremner was seconded to the Organization for Security and Cooperation in Europe (OSCE) as political section chief, Mission to Sarajevo following the Dayton Accords. From 1996 to 2000 She was posted to the United States Mission to NATO in Brussels, Belgium.

From 2000 to 2004, Bremner served for four years as a political officer at the United States Embassy Paris, France, overseeing Franco-U.S. cooperation on European security and defense policy. From 2004 to 2006, She served as Political Unit Chief in the Office of Korean Affairs, Bureau of East Asian and Pacific Affairs (EAP/K), managing North Korea-United States relations and related policies, and also took part in the 2005 and 2006 Six-Party Talks in Beijing, China. From 2006 to 2008, Bremner was deputy director of the EAP Office of Taiwan Coordination (EAP/TC), and served as acting EAP/TC director upon the promotion of her predecessor, Clifford Hart. From February 2009, she was assigned to Ndjamena, Chad to serve as DCM and Charge d'affaires. After July 2011, when her tenure in Chad ended, she left for Djibouti to act as Political Adviser to the Combined Joint Task Force – Horn of Africa (CJTF-HOA). Since July 2012, she began her service as Charge d'affaires to Eritrea, and ended her service in April 2014.

She retired from the Foreign Service in 2019 and became the Labor Management adviser at the United States Agency for International Development.
