= Joel Reifman =

American diplomat

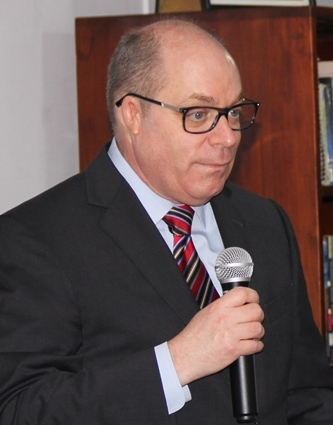
Joel Richard Reifman in 2017

Joel Richard Reifman (born 1959) was the U.S. Consul General in Hyderabad serving 2019 to 2022. Reifman has also been Charge d’ Affaires at the U.S. Embassy in Asmara, Eritrea (July, 2010 until February 2012) Provincial Reconstruction Team Leader in Iraq's western Anbar province, and an Assistant Staff Judge Advocate in the U.S. Air Force.

Reifman earned a Bachelor of Arts degree in English literature from the University of Michigan and a Juris Doctor from Southern Methodist University.
