= Sandra E. Clark =

American diplomat

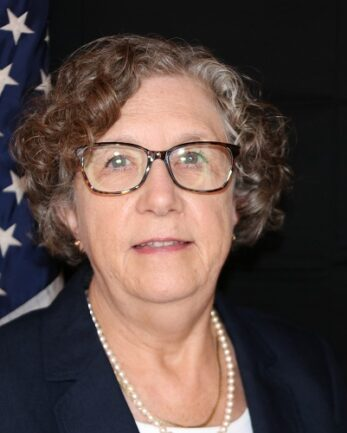

United States Ambassador to Burkina Faso
- In office September 25, 2020 – December 18, 2023
- President: Donald Trump; Joe Biden
- Preceded by: Andrew Robert Young
- Succeeded by: Joann M. Lockard

Personal details
- Education: Swarthmore College (BA); Columbia University (JD)

Sandra Eliane Clark is an American diplomat who served as the United States ambassador to Burkina Faso from 2020 to 2023.

== Early life and education ==
Clark earned her Bachelor of Arts from Swarthmore College and her Juris Doctor from Columbia University School of Law.

== Career ==
Clark is a career member of the Senior Foreign Service, class of Minister-Counselor. During her diplomatic and State Department career, she has held many positions including Director of the Office of West African Affairs in the Bureau of African Affairs, Senior Fellow at the German Marshall Fund, Deputy Chief of Mission of the United States Embassy Dakar, Senegal, Deputy Coordinator of Assistance to Europe and Eurasia, and as Director of the Office of Economic Policy and Public Diplomacy.

She has also served as the Economic Counselor at the United States Embassy in London, England, Special Assistant to the Under Secretary of State for Economic Growth, Energy, and the Environment, and as Deputy Director in the Office of North Central European Affairs.

=== U.S. ambassador to Burkina Faso ===
On August 6, 2019, President Donald Trump announced his intent to nominate Clark to be the next United States Ambassador to Burkina Faso. On September 9, 2019, her nomination was sent to the United States Senate. On May 13, 2020, a hearing on her nomination was held before the Foreign Relations Committee. Her nomination was confirmed on August 6, 2020 by voice vote. She was sworn in on August 12, 2020. She presented her credentials to President Roch Marc Christian Kaboré on September 25, 2020.

== Personal life ==
Clark speaks French and Russian.

Diplomatic posts
Preceded by Andrew Robert Young	United States Ambassador to Burkina Faso; 2020–2023	Succeeded by Joann M. Lockard
