= List of ambassadors of the United States to Zimbabwe =

Ambassador of the United States to Zimbabwe
- Seal of the United States Department of State

- Flag of a United States ambassador

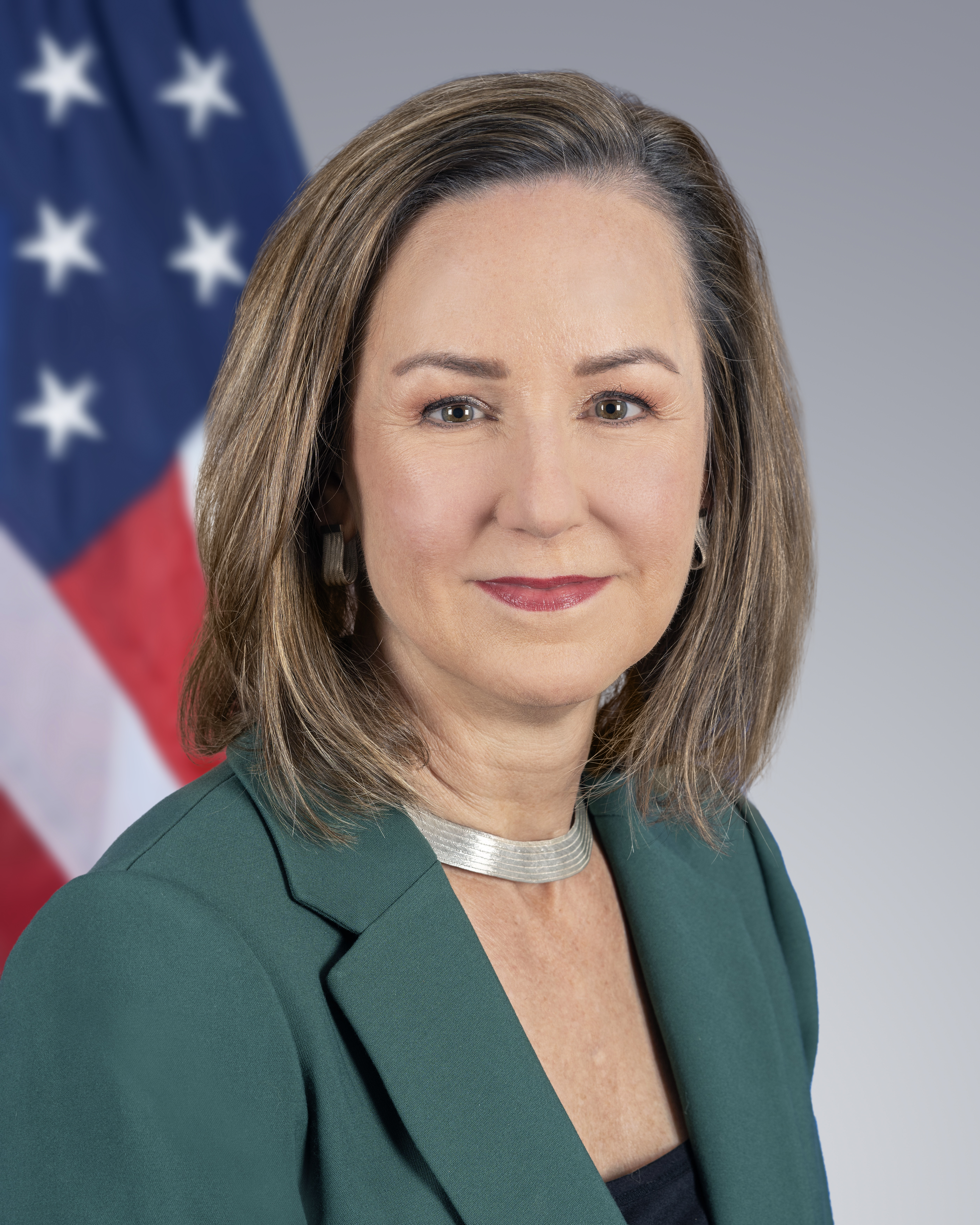
- Incumbent; Pamela Tremont since July 17, 2024
- Nominator: The president of the United States
- Inaugural holder: Robert V. Keeley as Ambassador Extraordinary and Plenipotentiary
- Formation: May 23, 1980
- Website: U.S. Embassy - Harare

The first United States ambassador to Zimbabwe was appointed on May 23, 1980, after the Republic of Zimbabwe replaced the previous white-minority government of Rhodesia, and its successor Zimbabwe-Rhodesia (1979–1980).

The Republic of Zimbabwe came into being on April 18, 1980. The United States immediately recognized the new nation and moved to establish diplomatic relations. An embassy in Harare was established on April 18, 1980—independence day for Zimbabwe. Jeffrey Davidow was appointed as chargé d'affaires ad interim pending the appointment of an ambassador. The first ambassador, Robert V. Keeley, was appointed one month later on May 23, 1980.

== Ambassadors ==
Image	Name	Title	Appointed	Presented credentials	Terminated mission	Notes
	Robert V. Keeley – Career FSO	Ambassador Extraordinary and Plenipotentiary	May 23, 1980	June 19, 1980	February 20, 1984	
	David Charles Miller, Jr. – political appointee	Ambassador Extraordinary and Plenipotentiary	March 30, 1984	May 31, 1984	April 17, 1986	
	James Wilson Rawlings – Political appointee	Ambassador Extraordinary and Plenipotentiary	October 16, 1986	November 27, 1986	March 30, 1989	Edward F. Fugit served as chargé d'affaires ad interim, March 1989-April 1990.
	J. Steven Rhodes – Political appointee	Ambassador Extraordinary and Plenipotentiary	March 8, 1990	April 5, 1990	August 6, 1990	
	Edward G. Lanpher – Career FSO	Ambassador Extraordinary and Plenipotentiary	October 25, 1991	November 20, 1991	January 12, 1995	
	Johnnie Carson – Career FSO	Ambassador Extraordinary and Plenipotentiary	March 4, 1995	April 20, 1995	July 25, 1997	
	Tom McDonald – Political appointee	Ambassador Extraordinary and Plenipotentiary	November 4, 1997	December 11, 1997	December 15, 2000	
	Joseph Gerard Sullivan – Career FSO	Ambassador Extraordinary and Plenipotentiary	August 7, 2001	October 18, 2001	August 26, 2004	
	Christopher W. Dell – Career FSO	Ambassador Extraordinary and Plenipotentiary	August 11, 2004	September 2, 2004	July 14, 2007	
	James D. McGee – Career FSO	Ambassador Extraordinary and Plenipotentiary	October 29, 2007	November 22, 2007	July 5, 2009	
	Charles A. Ray – Career FSO	Ambassador Extraordinary and Plenipotentiary	September 14, 2009	December 9, 2009	August 7, 2012	
	D. Bruce Wharton – Career FSO	Ambassador Extraordinary and Plenipotentiary	August 3, 2012	November 15, 2012	November 14, 2015	
	Harry K. Thomas, Jr. – Career FSO	Ambassador Extraordinary and Plenipotentiary	December 8, 2015	February 25, 2016	March 25, 2018	
	Brian A. Nichols – Career FSO	Ambassador Extraordinary and Plenipotentiary	July 2, 2018	July 19, 2018	September 14, 2021	
	Thomas R. Hastings – Career FSO	Chargé d’Affaires ad interim	September 14, 2021		August 19, 2022	
	Elanie M. French – Career FSO	Chargé d’Affaires ad interim	August 19, 2022		July 17, 2024	
	Pamela Tremont – Career FSO	Ambassador Extraordinary and Plenipotentiary	May 2, 2024	July 17, 2024	Incumbent	

== See also ==
- United States - Zimbabwe relations
- Foreign relations of Zimbabwe
