= James Rawlings =

James Rawlings may refer to:

- James B. Rawlings (born 1957), American chemical engineering professor
- James Wilson Rawlings (1929–2013), American diplomat
