= Lanpher =

Lanpher is a surname. Notable people with the surname include:

- Diane Lanpher (born 1955), American politician
- Edward G. Lanpher (born 1942), American diplomat
- Katherine Lanpher (born 1959), American writer, journalist, broadcaster, and podcaster
