= Edward R. Murrow Award =

The Edward R. Murrow Award may refer to one of several awards named after American journalist Edward R. Murrow:

- Edward R. Murrow Award (Corporation for Public Broadcasting), given out to individuals in public radio since 1977
- Edward R. Murrow Award (Overseas Press Club of America), given annually since 1978 for "Best TV interpretation or documentary on international affairs"
- Edward R. Murrow Award (Radio Television Digital News Association), given to broadcast news organizations since 1971
- Edward R. Murrow Award (Washington State University), a journalism/communication honor extended by the Edward R. Murrow College of Communication of Washington State University since 1992
- Edward R. Murrow Award for Excellence in Public Diplomacy, given to a U.S. State Department employee by the Fletcher School at Tufts University
