= Scott Gration =

U.S. Air Force general (born 1951)

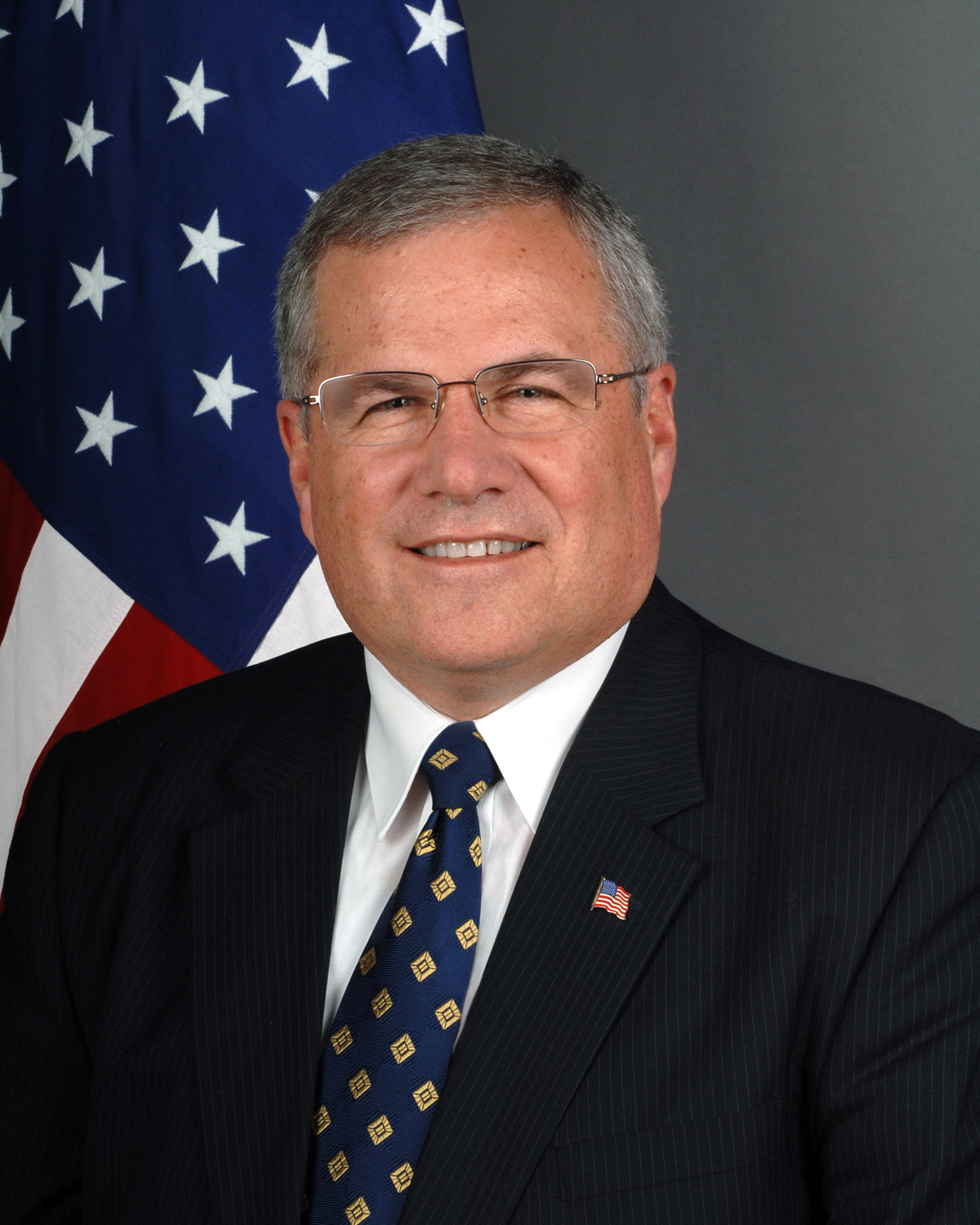

United States Ambassador to Kenya
- In office May 18, 2011 – July 23, 2012
- President: Barack Obama
- Preceded by: Michael Ranneberger
- Succeeded by: Robert F. Godec

United States Special Envoy to Sudan
- In office March 17, 2009 – April 1, 2011
- President: Barack Obama
- Preceded by: Position established
- Succeeded by: Princeton Lyman

Personal details
- Born: Jonathan Scott Gration; 1951 (age 74–75) St. Charles, Illinois, U.S.
- Education: Rutgers University, New Brunswick (BS); Georgetown University (MS)

Military service
- Allegiance: United States
- Branch/service: United States Air Force
- Years of service: 1974–2006
- Rank: Major General
- Commands: 4404th Operations Group (Provisional); 39th Air and Space Expeditionary Wing; 3rd Wing
- Battles/wars: Operation Iraqi Freedom; Operation Provide Comfort; Operation Southern Watch; Operation Northern Watch
- Awards: Air Force Distinguished Service Medal; Defense Superior Service Medal; Legion of Merit; Bronze Star; Purple Heart

Jonathan Scott Gration (born 1951) is a former United States Air Force officer who worked as a policy advisor to President Barack Obama.

Born in Illinois, Gration then grew up in Central and East Africa with his missionary parents. He studied at Rutgers University and Georgetown University before joining the Air Force. He remained in the Air Force for three decades, flying 274 combat missions and being awarded the Legion of Merit, a Bronze Star, a Purple Heart, and various other decorations. He was also found guilty by the Inspector General's Office of mistakenly falsifying at least 3 combat missions while commander of the 39th Wing. He later advised and stumped for the 2008 presidential campaign of Barack Obama.

In 2009, Obama named Gration as the United States Special Envoy to Sudan. Gration subsequently worked as United States Ambassador to Kenya from 2011 to 2012 before resigning in the face of potential disciplinary action for unclassified email use and other issues. Since 2012, he has worked in the private sector and released a memoir about his military and public service.

== Early life and education ==
Gration, known by his middle name Scott, was born in St. Charles, Illinois, the son of Dorothy E. (née Harpel) and John Alexander Gration. His paternal grandparents were British. He spent his early childhood in what is now the Democratic Republic of Congo (then the Belgian Congo, later Zaïre) and Kenya, while his parents worked as missionary teachers. The first sentence he ever spoke was in Kiswahili, and he has been a Kiswahili speaker his entire life. During the Congo Crisis in the early 1960s, his family was evacuated three times, and they became refugees, relocating to Kenya after the third evacuation in 1964.

After his family returned to the United States, he studied at Rutgers University, where he enlisted in the ROTC program and earned a bachelor's degree in mechanical engineering. He earned a master's degree in national security studies from Georgetown University in Washington in 1988.

== Military career ==
Upon graduating from Rutgers, his "low draft number" motivated him to join the United States Air Force in September 1974. While serving, he "sometimes took leaves of absence to work on village projects in Uganda and elsewhere." After initial pilot training, Gration trained as an instructor, and instructed trainees on both the T-38 and F-5, reaching the rank of captain. In 1980, he worked for two years as an F-5 instructor pilot with the Kenya Air Force, following which he was selected as a White House Fellow and spent a year assisting Dr. Hans Mark, the Deputy Administrator of NASA.

Returning to flight service, he trained on the F-16, and then spent two years as an instructor and flight commander, being promoted to major. In December 1985 he was posted to USAF Headquarters in Washington to advise on international political and military affairs in the Office of Regional Plans and Policy. During this time, he received a Master of Arts in National Security Studies from Georgetown University.

From January 1988 he attended the Armed Forces Staff College for six months, then was promoted to lieutenant colonel and appointed to a staff position in 6th Allied Tactical Air Force in İzmir, Turkey. In September 1990, he returned to flying service, as an instructor pilot and operations officer for the 512th Fighter Squadron, and in August 1991 he was appointed Chief of Safety for the 86th Fighter Wing, both based at Ramstein AB, Germany. During this period, he also flew combat missions supporting Operation Provide Comfort.

From June 1992 he spent a year studying at the National War College, followed by two years of staff duties in Washington, including a six-month period as an executive officer to the Chief of Staff of the Air Force, and as a planner for the National Security Council.

In mid-1995, now promoted to colonel, he returned to flight service, and that June took up command of the 4404th Operations Group (Provisional) in Saudi Arabia. He held command until July 1996, and was in command of the group at the time of the Khobar Towers bombing. In August 1996, he was transferred to command the 39th Wing in Turkey, and held the post for two and a half years, overseeing the start of Operation Northern Watch, enforcing the no-fly zone over northern Iraq. In mid-1998 he was transferred to command 3rd Wing in Alaska, and held command until January 2000. Unlike previous commanders, he held the position for a year as a colonel. In October 1999, he was finally promoted to brigadier-general. His original promotion to brigadier-general was cancelled due to being found guilty of "mistakenly" falsifying combat sorties while in command of the 39th Wing.

Through 2000 and 2001 he was deputy director for operations (J-39, responsible for information operations) in the Joint Staff in Washington – as a result of which he was in the Pentagon when it was hit on September 11, 2001 – and then spent a year and a half as director of regional affairs for the Deputy Undersecretary of the Air Force for International Affairs; during the last six months of this period, January to June 2003, he was promoted to major-general and commanded Joint Task Force-West during Operation Iraqi Freedom.

In August 2003 he was appointed Assistant Deputy Undersecretary of the Air Force for International Affairs, and in June 2004 the director, strategy, plans, and policy directorate of United States European Command.

In the course of his career, Gration recorded more than 5,000 flying hours, including 983 hours of combat and combat support time in 274 combat missions over Iraq. He was awarded the Defense Superior Service Medal and the Legion of Merit, as well as the Bronze Star, the Purple Heart, and seventy nine other decorations.

=== Military Promotion dates ===
- Second Lieutenant Jan. 24, 1974
- First Lieutenant July 24, 1976
- Captain July 24, 1978
- Major May 1, 1985
- Lieutenant Colonel June 1, 1988
- Colonel Jan. 1, 1995
- Brigadier General Oct. 1, 1999 (original line number cancelled)
- Major General April 1, 2003

== Political activity ==
Gration voted for George W. Bush in 2000. In 2006, he traveled to Africa on a five-nation, fifteen-day, fact-finding tour, accompanying Senator Barack Obama as an "African expert". He later endorsed Obama's presidential campaign, citing that Obama had the "judgment, wisdom, courage, experience, and leadership capability that we desperately need."

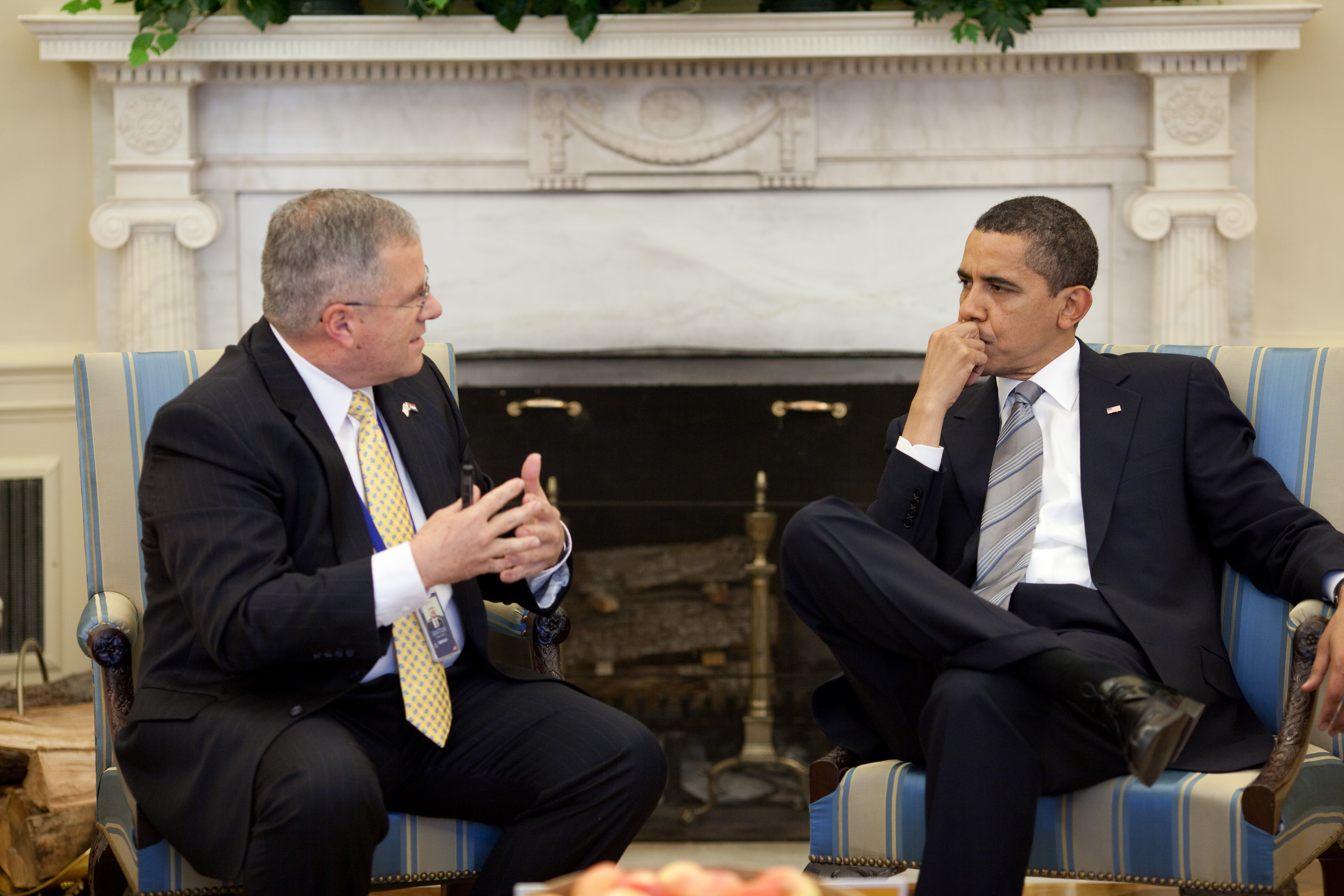
Gration with President Barack Obama in the Oval Office in 2009

In 2007, the Obama campaign "beg[a]n sending Gration out on the stump . . . in an effort to improve the inexperienced senator's image on national security." According to Obama foreign policy advisor Denis McDonough, Gration was "considered one of Obama's three top military advisers, along with Richard Danzig, the former secretary of the Navy during the Clinton administration, and Gen. Merrill McPeak, former Air Force chief of staff." Newsweek described him as "the General Who Lends Gravitas to Obama".

Press reports say that in 2009, as a senior official on Obama's transition team, Gration called and emailed several of President Bush's Pentagon appointees to inform them they were being dismissed. Those calls and emails were followed up by an email from Jim O'Beirne, the special assistant to the secretary of defense for White House liaisons, who expressed exasperation that Gration informed the employees directly instead of letting O'Beirne's office know first. A Pentagon spokesperson said Secretary of Defense Robert Gates was "absolutely satisfied" with how the transition was handled.

== Civil service ==
After retiring from the Air Force, Gration served as CEO of Millennium Villages, an organization dedicated to reducing extreme poverty. He then joined the Safe Water Network where he helped to provide safe water to vulnerable populations in India, Bangladesh, and Ghana.

In January 2009 it was speculated that he would be nominated to be the 12th administrator of NASA, replacing Michael Griffin. Gration's nomination became difficult because the law requires that the space agency chief be appointed from civilian life by the president by and with the advice and consent of the Senate. U.S. Senator Bill Nelson (D-Fla.), who chairs the Senate Subcommittee on Science and Space, a key NASA oversight panel, strongly advised then President-elect Obama to avoid selecting Gration as the space agency chief due to his lack of NASA experience.

Sources close to the Obama transition, however, said Gration helped write the seven-page space policy paper the Obama campaign released in the August supporting the goal of sending humans to the Moon by 2020 and calling for narrowing the gap between the retirement of the space shuttle and the first flight of its successor system. The paper stood out as the most comprehensive policy statement on NASA released by a major presidential candidate in recent history.

== United States Special Envoy to Sudan ==
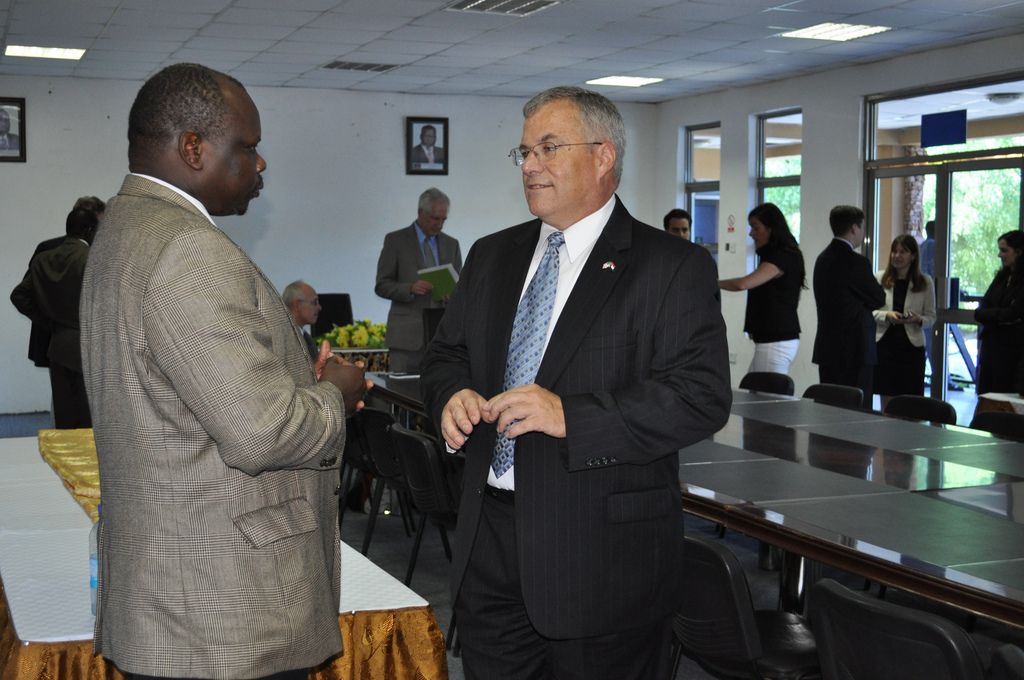
Gration (right) speaks with South Sudanese leader Pagan Amum (left)

On March 17, 2009, Gration was named U.S. Special Envoy to Sudan. He took a conciliatory approach to the regime of Sudanese President Omar al-Bashir, and downplayed reports of ongoing genocide in the Darfur conflict. Gration's comments that the International Criminal Court's indictment of al-Bashir made his mission "more difficult and challenging" drew criticism. He clashed with United States Ambassador to the United Nations Susan Rice over his approach.

Gration and his team were able to coordinate an end to the Chad-Sudan conflict, unify most of the Darfur rebel groups and encourage their participation in the Doha peace talks, and assist the 2010 Sudanese national elections and the 2011 Southern Sudan referendum on independence.

On appointing Ambassador Princeton Lyman to replace Gration as special envoy, on April 1, 2011, U.S. Secretary of State Hillary Clinton recognized Gration as a "dedicated public servant," saying "Scott has been instrumental to our work in Sudan over the last two years. We are absolutely delighted that the President has nominated him to be our next Ambassador to Kenya, and we will continue to rely on his passion and skills for the people of the region and we thank [him] for [his] service."

In a March 2013 speech at the Wilson Center in Washington, DC, Assistant Secretary of State for African Affairs Johnnie Carson called U.S. efforts led by Gration and Lyman "a major accomplishment" of the Obama administration. Carson said: "Under the leadership of President Obama's special envoys, first General Scott Gration and now Ambassador Princeton Lyman, the United States led international efforts to reinvigorate the CPA. President Obama, Secretary Clinton, and Ambassador Susan Rice's leadership kept the 2011 referendum on South Sudan's independence on track, and led to South Sudan's independence in July 2011."

== United States Ambassador to Kenya ==
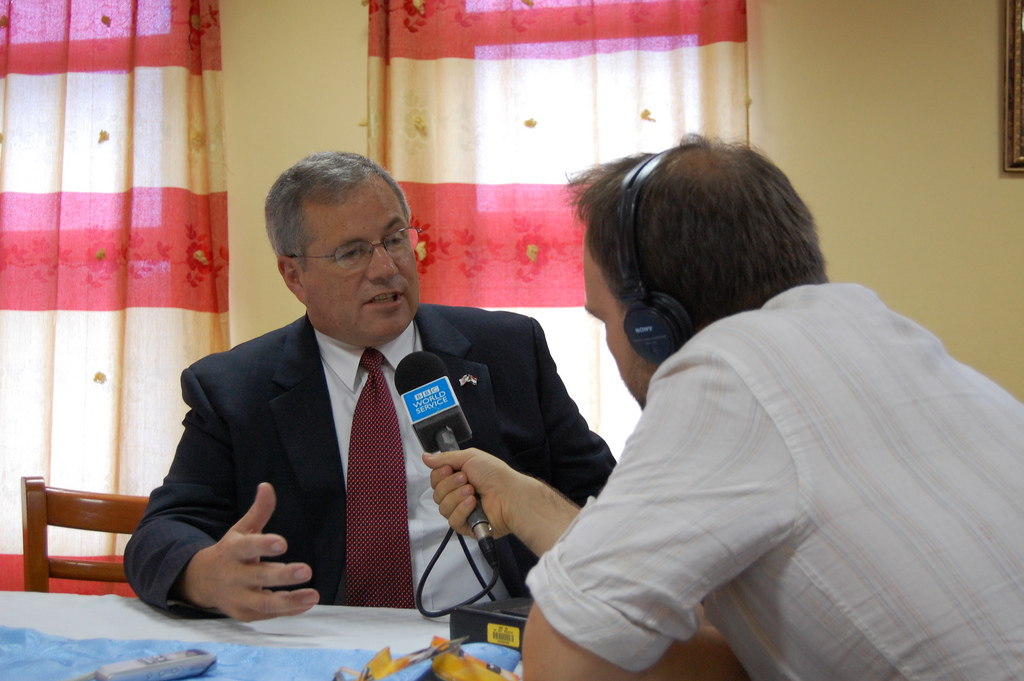
Gration during an interview with BBC

President Obama announced his intent to nominate Gration as United States Ambassador to Kenya on February 10, 2011. His nomination was transmitted to the United States Senate four days later and was approved. Gration served for 13 months before resigning, citing unspecified "differences" with the Obama administration. His tenure as ambassador coincided with armed intervention by Kenya in Somalia, in response to the growing influence of Al-Shabaab, a subsidiary of Al Qaeda. News reports stated that Gration resigned weeks before the scheduled release of a U.S. government audit highly critical of his leadership at the embassy and the start of potential disciplinary action against him.

Gration described media reports describing various theories as to why he resigned his post as "silliness". In an interview with The Cable, Gration insisted that his one-year tenure as the U.S. envoy in Nairobi was a success. Speaking in 2015, Gration attributed his resignation to "the use of Gmail in the US Embassy, my insistence on improving our physical security posture, and other twisted and false allegations". According to an article in Ars Technica, he "worked out of a bathroom because it was the only place in the embassy where he could use an unsecured network and his personal computer, using Gmail to conduct official business. And he did all this during a time when Chinese hackers were penetrating the personal Gmail inboxes of a number of US diplomats."

The Inspector General's report on Gration's behavior stated that "The Ambassador has lost the respect and confidence of the staff to lead the mission" and that his leadership had been "divisive and ineffective." It found that he directed staff to work on projects with "unclear status and almost no value," did not read classified front channel messages, used commercial e-mail systems instead of secure government ones for official and sensitive business, and ignored U.S. government policy.

The potential action against Gration became a talking point in the Hillary Clinton email controversy during her 2016 presidential campaign as part of the attempt to establish whether the State Department had official guidelines on personal email accounts during her tenure.

== Private sector ==
Following his resignation as ambassador, Gration returned to the private sector, heading an investment group in East Africa. He also released a memoir, Flight Path: Son of Africa to Warrior-Diplomat (Mulami Books, 2016), telling his life story and defending himself against the charges that led to his resignation.

Diplomatic posts
New office	United States Special Envoy to Sudan; 2009–2011	Succeeded by Princeton Lyman
Preceded by Michael Ranneberger	United States Ambassador to Kenya; 2011–2012	Succeeded by Robert F. Godec
