= United States–Zimbabwe relations =

- United States: Zimbabwe

Diplomatic mission
- Zimbabwean Embassy, Washington, D.C.

United States–Zimbabwe relations are bilateral relations between the United States and Zimbabwe. Both countries share a common history and language as former British colonies.

== History of relations ==
=== U.S. relations with Southern Rhodesia ===
Southern Rhodesia–United States relations
- United States: Southern Rhodesia

=== U.S. relations with Rhodesia ===
Rhodesia–United States relations
- United States: Rhodesia

Republic of Rhodesia–United States relations
- United States: Rhodesia

After the Unilateral Declaration of Independence of Rhodesia in November 1965, the United States recalled its Consul General from Salisbury (now Harare), closed the U.S. Information Service (USIS) library, and withdrew its U.S. Agency for International Development (USAID) and trade promotion officials. After 1965, the small remaining American consular staff continued to operate under authority of exequaturs issued by Queen Elizabeth II. Following Rhodesia's declaration of a republic, the United States closed its Consulate General on March 17, 1970.

In 1971, despite Administration opposition, the U.S. Congress passed the Byrd Amendment, which permitted the United States to import strategic materials, such as chrome, from Rhodesia. The legislation, which took effect on January 1, 1972, was of little real economic benefit to the Rhodesian economy, and the United States continued to support the balance of the sanctions program. After the legislation was repealed in March 1977, the United States once again enforced all sanctions.

The United States supported the United Nations and the United Kingdom consistently in their efforts to influence Rhodesian authorities to accept the principles of majority rule. Beginning in 1976, the United States began to take a more active role in the search for a settlement in cooperation with the UK. The Anglo-American proposals of late-1977, aimed at bringing a negotiated end to the dispute, lent the weight of the United States to the search for a peaceful settlement and were a counterpart to the Soviet-Cuban use of military power to increase their influence in southern Africa.

=== U.S. relations with Zimbabwe ===
The United States supported British efforts to bring about and implement the settlement signed at Lancaster House on December 21, 1979, and extended official diplomatic recognition to the new government immediately after independence as the Republic of Zimbabwe. A resident Embassy was established in Salisbury on Zimbabwean Independence Day, April 18, 1980. The first U.S. Ambassador arrived and presented his credentials in June 1980. US President Jimmy Carter met with Zimbabwean Prime Minister Robert Mugabe in August 1980. Author Geoff Hill criticized Carter for keeping "quiet as Mugabe's ZANU government nationalised the press, committed genocide against minority tribes and subverted [Zimbabwe's] constitution to make himself the sole source of authority."

At the Zimbabwe conference on reconstruction and development (ZIMCORD) in March 1981, the United States pledged $225,000,000 over a three-year period towards the Government of Zimbabwe's goals of post-war reconstruction, redistribution and development of land, and the development of skilled manpower. By the end of FY 1986, the United States had contributed $380,000,000 the majority in grants, with some loans and loan guarantees.

However, in July 1986, the US Government decided to discontinue future bilateral aid to Zimbabwe as a result of a continuing pattern of what the US government alleges were uncivil and undiplomatic statements and actions by the Government of Zimbabwe in the United Nations and elsewhere. Aid programmes previously agreed upon were not affected by the decision; nor were regional development programs that might benefit Zimbabwe. Full programming was restored in 1988.

USAID assistance to Zimbabwe since 2002 has focused on family planning, HIV/AIDS prevention, democracy and governance programs, emergency food aid, and assistance to internally displaced persons. The Centers for Disease Control and Prevention (CDC) began a direct assistance program in August 2000. CDC's program consists of prevention of HIV transmission, improved care for persons with HIV/AIDS, surveillance, monitoring and evaluation of the epidemic, and health-sector infrastructure support.

Since 2000, the United States has taken a leading role in condemning the Zimbabwean Government's alleged assault on human rights and rule of law. In 2002 and 2003, the United States imposed targeted measures on the Government of Zimbabwe, including financial and visa sanctions against selected individuals, a ban on transfers of defence items and services, and a suspension of non-humanitarian government-to-government assistance. Despite strained political relations, the United States continues as a leading provider of humanitarian assistance to the people of Zimbabwe, providing about $400,000,000 in humanitarian assistance from 2002 to 2007, most of it being food aid.

French President Jacques Chirac angered the governments of the United Kingdom and the United States in February 2003, when he invited President Mugabe to a Franco-African conference on Africa held in France. Mugabe said he felt "at home" in Paris and "President Chirac insisted that we attend. He held firm to his principles. We need leaders of his stature." Chirac later emphasised that he had not kissed Mugabe on his cheeks when the conference began. The UK had previously tried to get the European Union to deny Mugabe the right to come to Europe, citing alleged human rights abuses in Zimbabwe.

Zimbabwean Foreign Minister Simbarashe Mumbengegwi summoned the U.S. Ambassador to Zimbabwe Christopher Dell on November 9, 2005, and expressed his "extreme displeasure" with comments Dell made a few days earlier in Mutare: Dell had said government corruption had led to food shortages. Mugabe replied that Dell could "go to hell." Dell left Zimbabwe for Washington, D.C., United States, on November 9 for consultations after meeting with Mumbengegwi.

Mugabe visited Washington DC informally in September 1980, and on official working visits in September 1983, July 1991 and 1995, meeting with Presidents Carter, Reagan, Bush and Clinton respectively. He has also led a Zimbabwean delegation to the UN on several occasions, most recently in 2006. Vice-president George H.W. Bush visited Harare in November 1982 on a trip to several African countries.

Prime Minister Morgan Tsvangirai met with President Obama on June 12, 2009, at the White House.

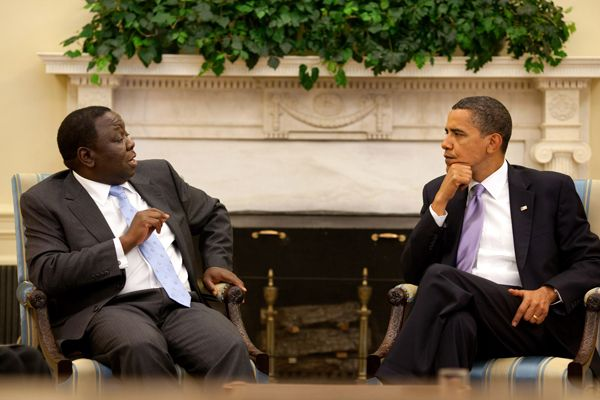
Tsvangirai meets with Obama in the White House in June 2009

After Morgan Tsvangirai, Mugabe's rival and leader of the Movement for Democratic Change, became Prime Minister of Zimbabwe under a power-sharing agreement, the Barack Obama administration extended its congratulations to Tsvangirai, but said that the U.S. would wait for evidence of Mugabe's co-operation with the MDC before it would consider lifting its sanctions. In early-March 2009, Obama proclaimed that US sanctions would be protracted provisionally for another year, because Zimbabwe's political crisis is as yet unresolved. He explained in a statement to Congress,

The crisis constituted by the actions and policies of certain members of the Government of Zimbabwe and other persons to undermine Zimbabwe's democratic processes or institutions has not been resolved.

These actions and policies pose a continuing, unusual and extraordinary threat to the foreign policy of the United States.

For these reasons, I have determined that it is necessary to continue this national emergency and to maintain in force the sanctions to respond to this threat.

== Principal U.S. officials ==
- Ambassador — Pamela Tremont
- Deputy Chief of Mission — Phil Nervig

== Diplomatic missions ==
- U.S. Embassy (Chancery), Harare
- U.S. Agency for International Development, Harare

== See also ==
- US and UK diplomats detained in Zimbabwe
