= William M. Bellamy =

American diplomat

United States Ambassador to Kenya
- In office April 16, 2003 – June 25, 2006
- President: George W. Bush
- Preceded by: Johnnie Carson
- Succeeded by: Michael Ranneberger

Personal details
- Born: William Markley Bellamy; August 31, 1950 (age 75) Okmulgee, Oklahoma, U.S.
- Relations: Ned Bellamy (brother)
- Education: Occidental College (BA); Tufts University (MA); Graduate Institute of International Studies

William Markley "Mark" Bellamy (born August 31, 1950) is a retired American diplomat and US government senior official. A career Foreign Service Officer, he served as United States ambassador to Kenya from 2003 to 2006 under President George W. Bush.

== Early life and education ==
Bellamy was born William Markley Bellamy in Okmulgee, Oklahoma, on August 31, 1950. He attended school in Ohio, Kentucky, Illinois and Missouri before his family moved to southern California in 1966. He was co-valedictorian of his graduating class at La Jolla High School in 1968. He earned a BA in history from Occidental College (Los Angeles) in 1972, and an MA in international relations from the Fletcher School of Law and Diplomacy at Tufts University (Medford, MA) in 1975.

== Career ==
=== State Department Service ===
Bellamy's overseas assignments included Political Counselor in South Africa (1991-1993), Political Minister-Counselor in France (1993-1997) and Deputy Chief of Mission in Australia (1997-2000). From 2001 to 2003 he was Principal Deputy Assistant Secretary of State for Africa in the State Department.

=== Ambassador to Kenya ===
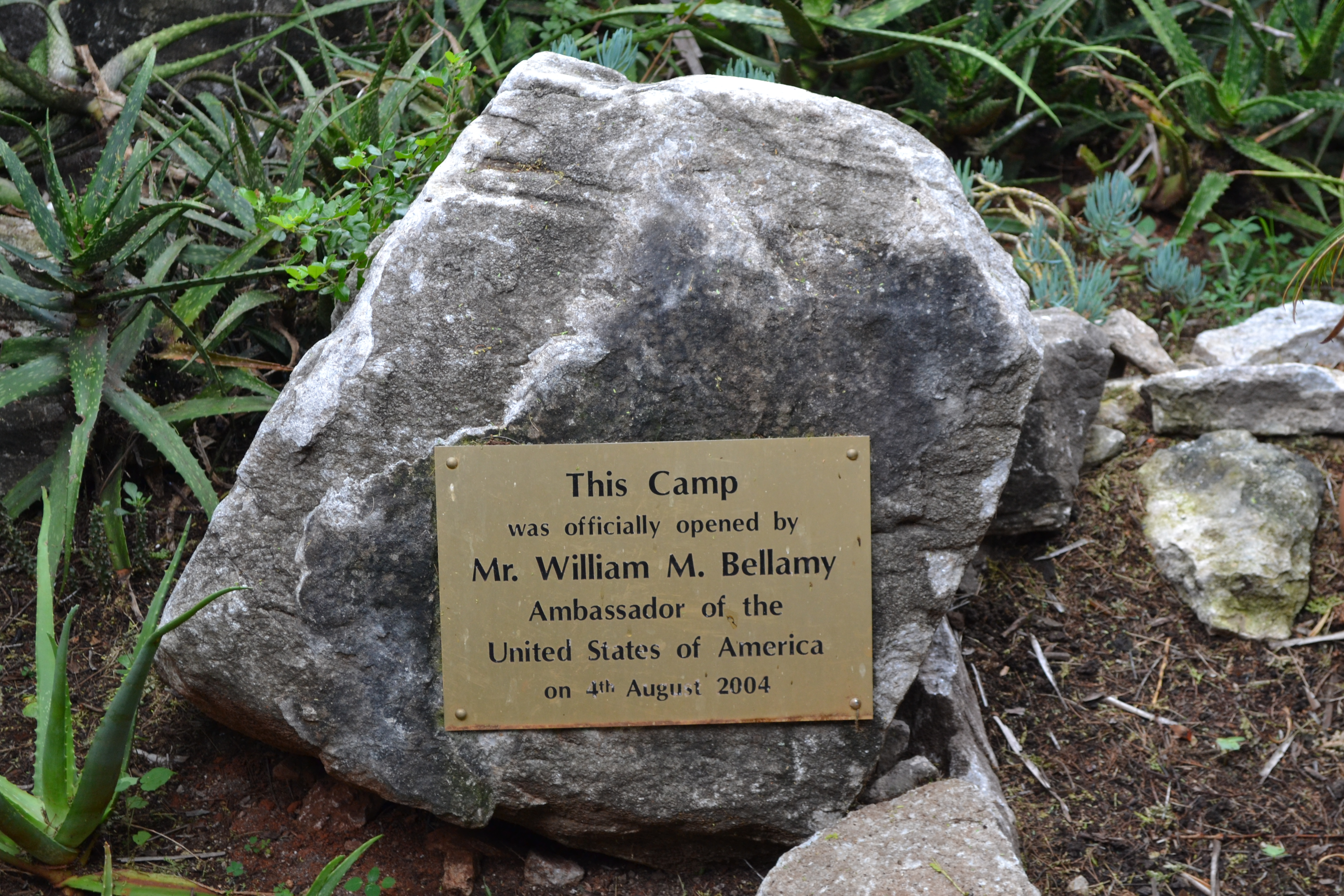
Bellamy opened the Lion's Bluff Lodge in the LUMO Community Wildlife Sanctuary

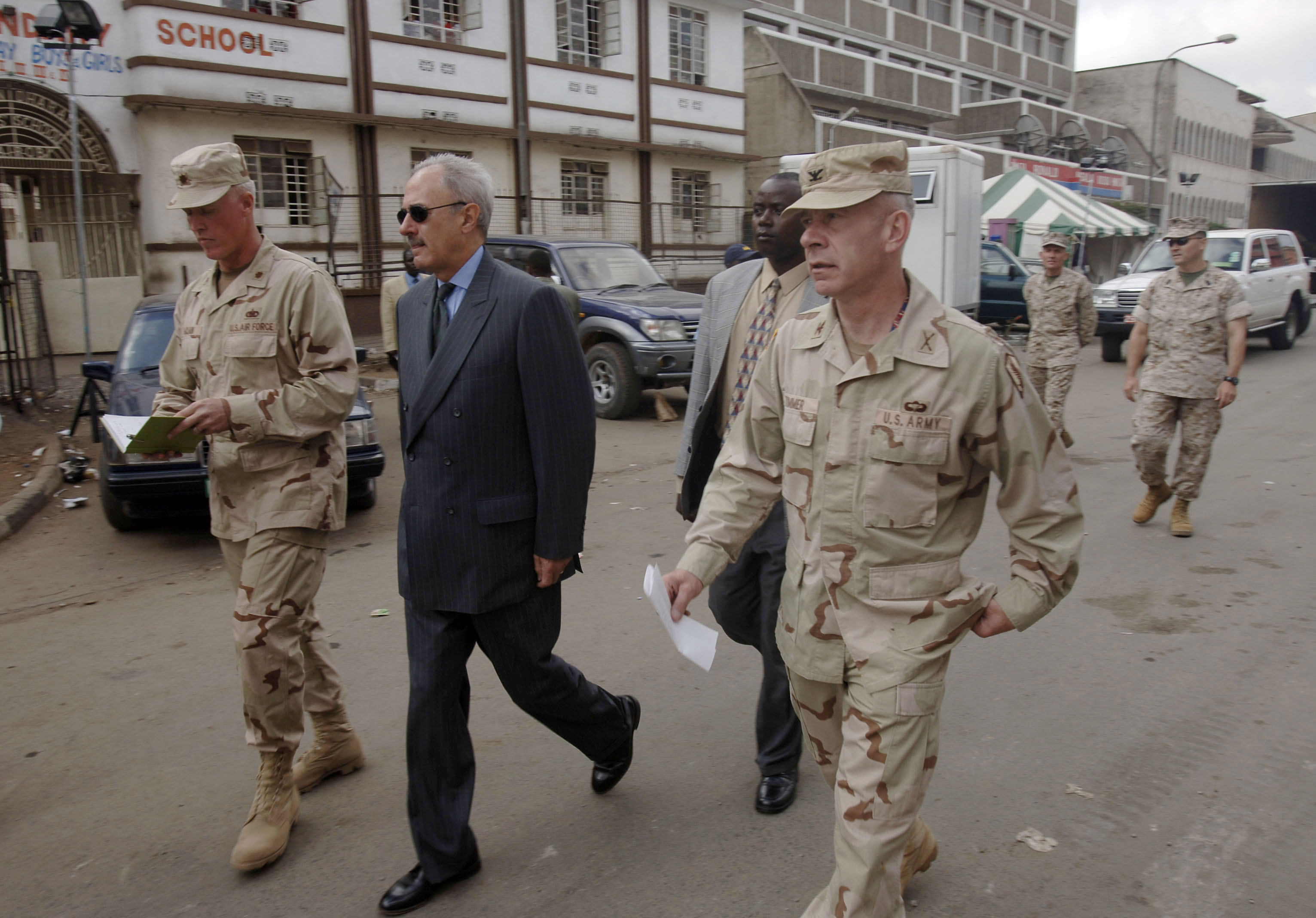
Bellamy following the 2006 Nairobi building collapse

In his role as United States Ambassador to Kenya (2003-2006), Bellamy directed security and counterterrorism programs in East Africa, oversaw the US government's largest overseas HIV-AIDS prevention and treatment program, and led international efforts to combat corruption and improve governance in Kenya.

=== Later career ===
Bellamy was senior vice president of the National Defense University (2006–07). Following retirement from the Foreign Service, he was named Director of the Africa Center for Strategic Studies (ACSS), a Department of Defense regional center located in Washington D.C. From 2008 to 2012 Bellamy directed the Center's research and educational exchange programs with more than 25 African governments and militaries.

In 2012, Bellamy was appointed Warburg Professor of Political Science and International Relations at Simmons University (Boston, MA). He lectured, taught and advised in this capacity until 2019 when he stepped down to join the Simmons University Board of trustees. Bellamy has been a senior adviser for Africa at the Center for Strategic and International Studies (CSIS) in Washington since 2014.

| Preceded by Johnnie Carson | United States Ambassador to Kenya; 2003 – 2006 | Succeeded by Michael Ranneberger |
