= D. Bruce Wharton =

American diplomat

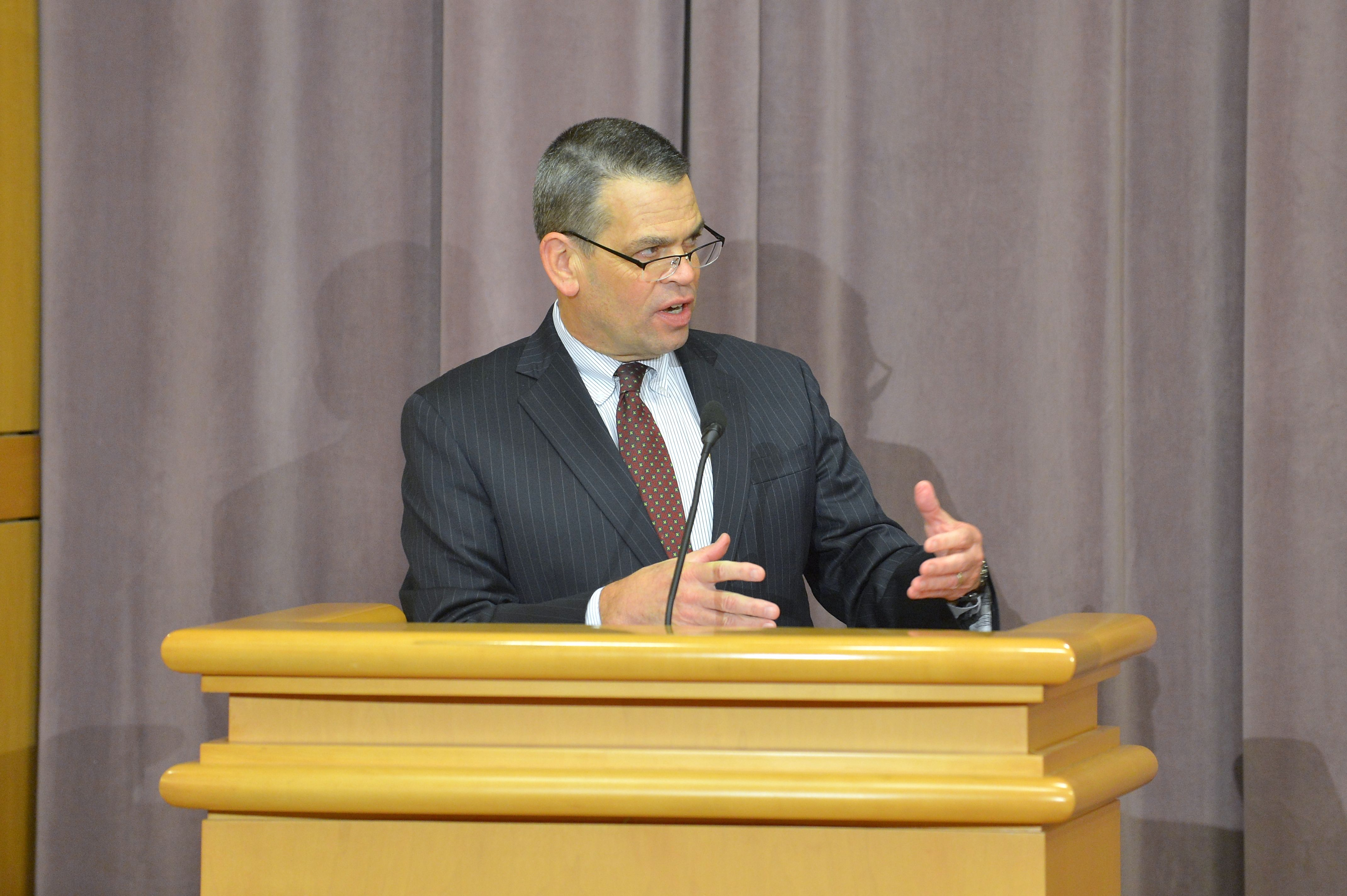
Wharton in 2017

David Bruce Wharton (born in Basel, Switzerland) was an American former diplomat who served as acting Under Secretary of State for Public Diplomacy and Public Affairs from December 8, 2016, to July 2017. Wharton graduated from the University of Texas at Austin and entered the United States Foreign Service in 1985, working in U.S. embassies in Argentina, Chile, Bolivia, South Africa, Zimbabwe, and Guatemala.He died in April 2026. He served as the Bureau of African Affairs Deputy Assistant Secretary for Public Diplomacy, African Affairs Director of the Office of Public Diplomacy and Public Affairs, and Deputy Coordinator of the Department of State’s Bureau of International Information Programs. He was the U.S. Ambassador to Zimbabwe from September 2012 to November 2015. Wharton retired in 2017.

Wharton speaks Spanish and German. He was the 2011 recipient of the Edward R. Murrow Award for Excellence in Public Diplomacy.
