= Tom McDonald (diplomat) =

American diplomat

United States Ambassador to Zimbabwe
- In office 1997–2001
- President: Bill Clinton

Personal details
- Born: 1954 (age 71–72)

Tom McDonald (born 1954) was the United States Ambassador to Zimbabwe from 1997 to 2001. A graduate of George Washington University and the University of Minnesota Law School, McDonald is now an attorney in the Washington, D.C. office of Taft, Stettinius & Hollister, LLP He is a member of the Council of American Ambassadors and the Council on Foreign Relations.

Diplomatic posts
Preceded by Johnnie Carson	United States Ambassador to Zimbabwe; 1997–2001	Succeeded by Joseph Gerard Sullivan
