= Michael Ranneberger =

American diplomat

Michael E. Ranneberger
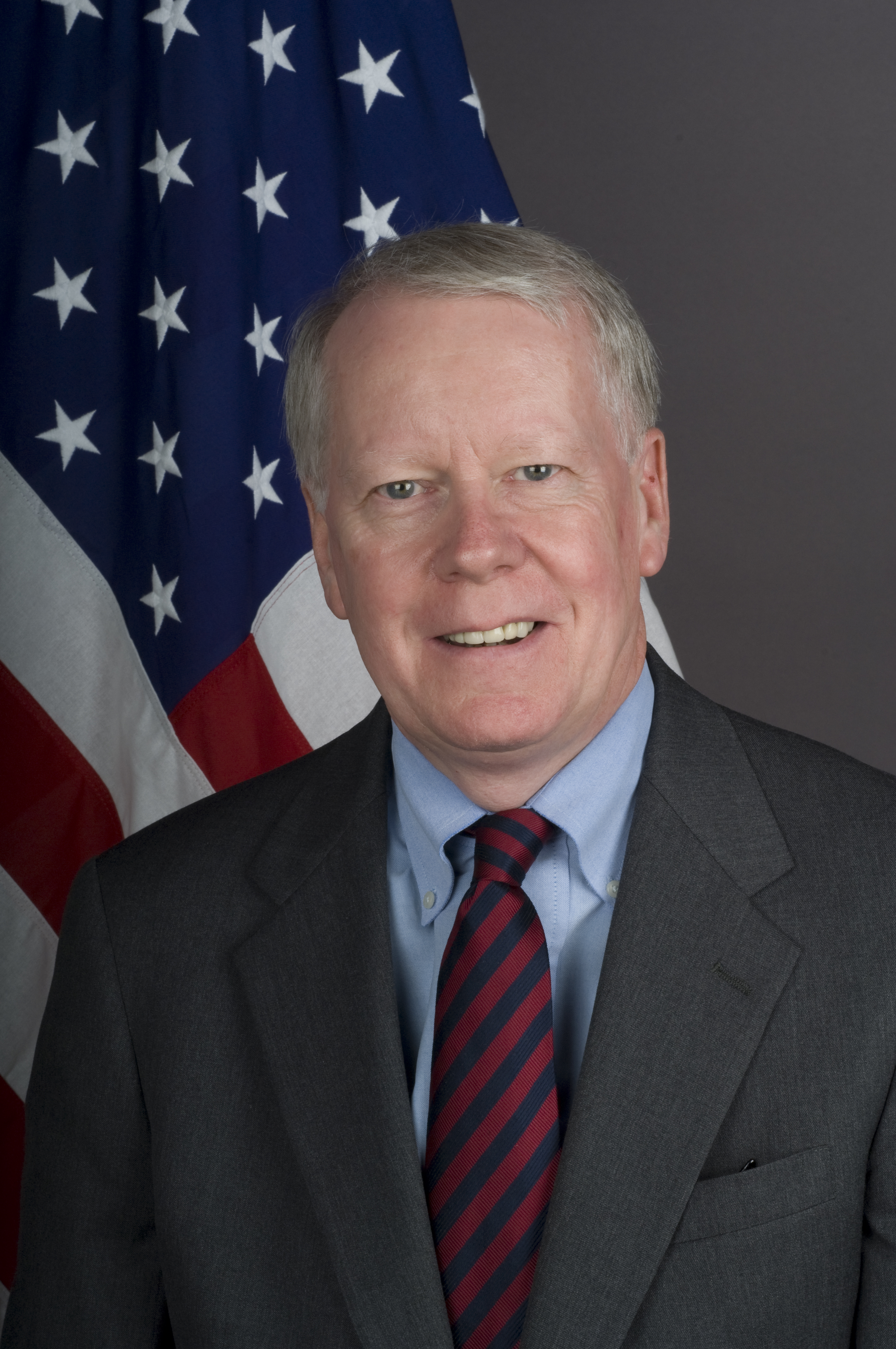

United States Ambassador to Kenya
- In office August 23, 2006 – May 4, 2011
- President: George W. Bush; Barack H. Obama
- Preceded by: William M. Bellamy
- Succeeded by: Scott Gration

United States Ambassador to Mali
- In office February 14, 2000 – July 28, 2002
- President: Bill Clinton; George W. Bush
- Preceded by: David Rawson
- Succeeded by: Vicki J. Huddleston

Personal details
- Born: Michael Edward Ranneberger; 1949 (age 76–77)
- Spouse: Ruth Konchella
- Education: Towson State University; University of Virginia

Michael Edward Ranneberger (born 1948) is an American diplomat. He is a former United States Ambassador to Kenya and Mali.

== Early life ==
Ranneberger attended Archbishop Curley High School, a Roman Catholic private school in Baltimore, Maryland. After graduating, he obtained a B.A. from Towson State University in Baltimore and an M.A. in history from the University of Virginia.

== Career ==
As Angola Desk Officer from 1981 to 1984, he worked as a member of Assistant Secretary of State for African Affairs Chester Crocker's team, negotiating independence for Namibia and the withdrawal of Cuban troops from Angola. Ranneberger was awarded an International Affairs Fellowship from the Council on Foreign Relations for his work as a Special Assistant to Under Secretary Michael Armacost from 1984 to 1985. He was the Deputy Chief of Mission in Maputo from 1986 to 1989. The Mozambican Civil War was also occurring during the time Ranneberger was in Maputo. From 1989 to 1992, he served as Deputy Chief of Mission in Asunción, where he was involved in supporting the post-Stroessner democratic transition. He then became Deputy Director for Central American Affairs from 1992 to 1994, and during that time he helped oversee implementation of the peace accords in El Salvador and made efforts to end the internal conflict in Guatemala.

In August 1994, he was appointed as the Deputy Chief of Mission in Mogadishu. In July 1995, Ranneberger was appointed as the Coordinator of Cuban Affairs Ranneberger helped lead the Administration’s policy to promote a peaceful democratic transition in Cuba, in part by intensifying support for human rights activists and the development of independent civil society. From 2000 to 2002, he served as the Ambassador to the Republic of Mali. He served as Special Advisor on Sudan from 2002 to 2004. From 2004 to 2005, he was the Africa Bureau’s Principal Deputy Assistant Secretary. Ranneberger served as the Senior Representative on Sudan in the Bureau of African Affairs from January to August 2006.

He was confirmed by Congress to be the United States Ambassador to Kenya on June 29, 2006 and began field duties on August 11, 2006. He left his post on May 4, 2011. He was also responsible for U.S. relations with Somalia, though he was not the United States Ambassador to Somalia as that position was vacant from 1991 to 2016. In 2019 Ranneberger's lobbying firm 'Gainful Solutions' was hired by South Sudan’s government to lobby the Trump administration to "delay and ultimately block establishment of the hybrid court", which is part of South Sudan's 2018 peace agreement.

He is a member of the Senior Foreign Service with the rank of Career Minister. He is the recipient of seven Superior Honor Awards from the United States Department of State and a Presidential Meritorious Service Award.

== Personal life ==
Ranneberger is married to Ruth Konchellah, whom he met in 2006 upon his arrival in Kenya. He currently resides in Tampa, Florida.
