= James Wilson Rawlings =

American diplomat

United States Ambassador to Zimbabwe
- In office 1986–1989
- President: Ronald Reagan
- Preceded by: David Charles Miller Jr
- Succeeded by: J. Steven Rhodes

Personal details
- Political party: Republican

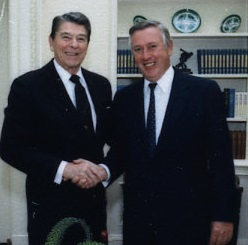
James Wilson Rawlings And Ronald Reagan

James Wilson Rawlings (October 12, 1929, Provo, Utah – November 1, 2013, Sonoma, California) was an American diplomat, Air Force pilot, and businessman who served as the US ambassador to Zimbabwe under Ronald Reagan (1986-1989). He succeeded David Charles Miller Jr. as Ambassador.

== Biography ==
Rawlings was born to parents Arnold Eber and Lillian "Corinne" Wilson Rawlings, graduated from Brigham Young Academy in 1948. While in the United States Air Force, he was an F-86 pilot in the 59th Fighter Interceptor Squadron stationed in Goose Bay, Labrador from 1950 to 1954. He graduated from Brigham Young University in 1955 and the University of Utah Law School in 1958 and was Editor in Chief of the Utah Law Review and a member of the Order of the Coif. His first job after law school was as a litigation associate at Chadbourne & Parke in New York City. He left to become general counsel for Union Carbide, eventually becoming Vice President of the Mining & Metals Division and before retiring in 1986 as Chairman of Union Carbide Southern Africa (another source says he was President) When he returned from Zimbabwe, Rawlings was Executive Secretary of the United States-Zimbabwe Business Council until he retired in 1992.
