= Ned Bellamy =

American actor

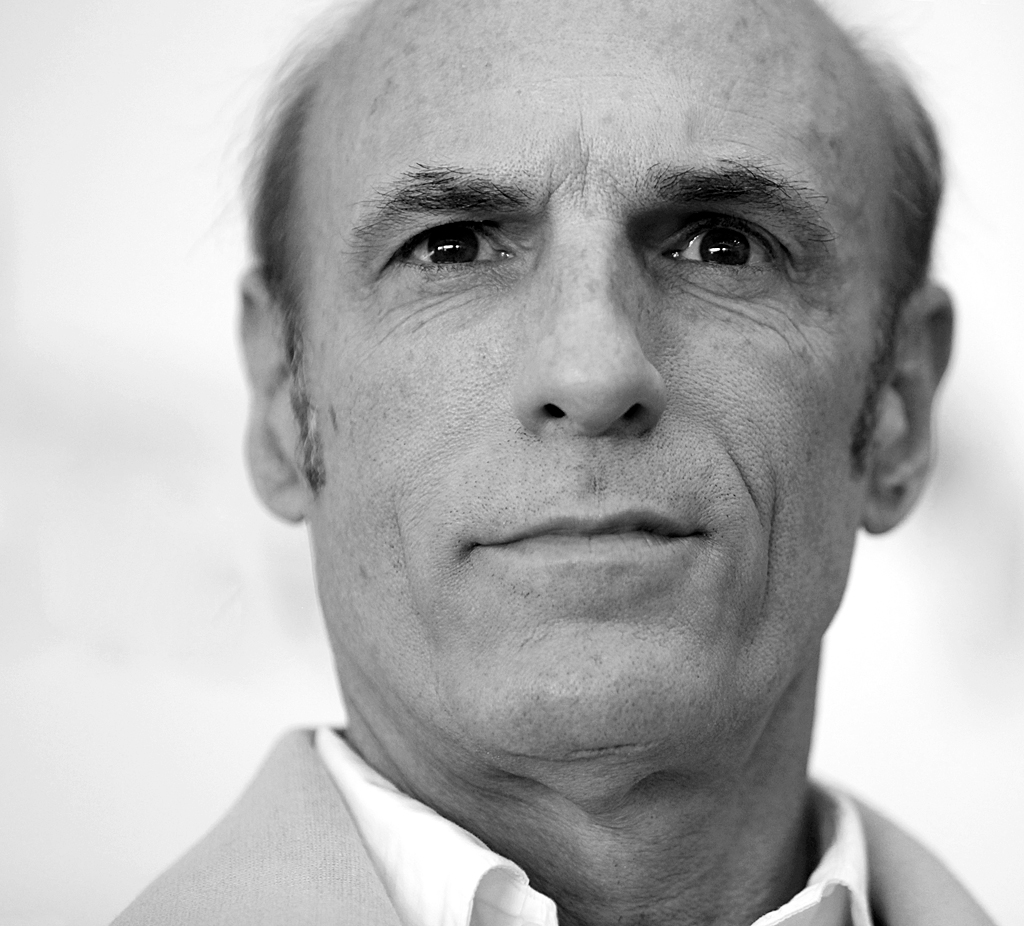
- Bellamy in 2011
- Born: May 7, 1957 (age 69); Dayton, Ohio, U.S.
- Occupation: Actor
- Years active: 1979–present
- Relatives: Mark Bellamy (brother)

Ned Bellamy (born May 7, 1957) is an American actor.

== Early life and education ==
Bellamy was born in Dayton, Ohio. He was educated at UCLA. His brother, Mark Bellamy, was the United States Ambassador to Kenya from 2003 until 2006.

== Career ==
After graduating from UCLA, Bellamy founded the Los Angeles–based theater company The Actors' Gang with fellow actor Tim Robbins.

Bellamy has appeared in numerous films and television series, including Scrubs, Treme, 24, Chicago P.D., Justified, Criminal Minds, Gotham, Paradise City, and The Larry Sanders Show. He portrayed the Reverend Lester Coggins in the first season of the CBS adaptation of Stephen King's Under the Dome.

Bellamy became a fan-favorite on an episode of Seinfeld, portraying Eddie, Julia Louis-Dreyfus’ army veteran co-writer in "The Fatigues". His television career began with another veteran—Paul, an American-born German soldier, in the final season of The Waltons.

Bellamy played Wilson in Quentin Tarantino’s seventh film, Django Unchained. In 2021, he appeared as Ross on the Amazon Prime series Paradise City.

== Filmography ==
=== Film ===
Year	Title	Role
1988	The Night Before	Tuff #2
1989	Wired	Paul Forrest
1990	Fatal Charm	Adolph
1992	Bob Roberts	Uzi Kornhauser
1992	Universal Soldier	FBI Agent
1992	House IV	Lee
1993	Twenty Bucks	Bowling Alley Entrepreneur
1993	Carnosaur	Fallon
1994	Cobb	Ray
1994	Ed Wood	Dr. Tom Mason
1994	Floundering	Phonebook
1994	The Shawshank Redemption	Youngblood
1997	Con Air	Chopper Pilot
1997	That Darn Cat	Agent #1
1999	Being John Malkovich	Derek Mantini
1999	Angel's Dance	Police Detective
1999	Cradle Will Rock	Paul Edwards
1999	Mystery Men	Funk
2000	Charlie's Angels	Red Star Systems Director
2001	Antitrust	Phil Grimes
2003	Runaway Jury	Jerome
2004	Saw	Jeff
2005	Lords of Dogtown	Peter Darling
2005	The Ice Harvest	Sidney
2006	Tenacious D in The Pick of Destiny	Security Guard
2006	The Contract	Evans
2007	Wind Chill	Snowplow Driver
2007	Skills like This	Uncle Morris
2008	Twilight	Waylon Forge
2008	War, Inc.	Ooq-Yu-Fay Taqnufmini/Zubleh
2011	Crazy Eyes	Bob
2012	The Paperboy	Tyree Van Wetter
2012	Django Unchained	Wilson
2013	Wish You Well	George Davis
2018	An L.A. Minute	Ross Brandt
2022	Blonde	Doc Fell
2022	Father Stu	Dr. Novak

=== Television ===
Year	Title	Role	Notes
1979	The Waltons	Paul	Episode: "The Spirit"
1982	The Greatest American Hero	R.J.	Episode: "The Shock Will Kill You"
1982	M*A*S*H	G.I.	Episode: "Where There's a Will, There's a War"
1984	The Dukes of Hazzard	Hoby	Episode "Play It Again, Luke"
1985	Diff'rent Strokes	Undercover Police Officer	Episode: "Sam's Missing"
1986	Remington Steele	Ernie	Episode: "Steele in the Running"
1986	The Twilight Zone	Man	Episode: "The After Hours"
1986	MacGyver	Larkin	Episode: "Ugly Duckling"
1987	21 Jump Street	Riordan	Episode: "Next Generation"
1988	MacGyver	Remick	Episode: "The Negotiator"
1989	Matlock	Lyle	Episode: "The Thoroughbred"
1991	Matlock	Jimmy Giles	Episode: "The Trial" Pt. 1
1992	In the Deep Woods	Jerome Spears	TV film
1992	Unsolved Mysteries	Coroner	Episode 5.8
1993	Murder, She Wrote	Captain Elgin Meyers	Episode: "The Survivor"
1995	Dumb and Dumber	Announcer (voice)	2 episodes
1996	Seinfeld	Eddie	Episode: "The Fatigues"
1996	Boy Meets World	Luther	Episode: "Turkey Day"
2004	CSI: Miami	Rick Bingham	Episode: "Rap Sheet"
2004	Scrubs	Dr. Green	2 episodes
2004	Law & Order: Special Victims Unit	Peter Carson	Episode: "Birthright"
2005	The Closer	Mr. Schiller	Episode: "Flashpoint"
2006	ER	Detective	2 episodes
2007	Law & Order: Special Victims Unit	Police Officer	Episode: "Dependent"
2007	Jericho	Deputy Perkins	2 episodes
2008–2009	Terminator: The Sarah Connor Chronicles	Ed Winston	3 episodes
2008–2009; 2011	WordGirl	The Coach, Fish Selling Guy (voices)	4 episodes
2009	24	Attorney General	Episode: "Day 7: 11:00 p.m.-12:00 a.m."
2011	Treme	Vincent Abreu	Recurring role
2013	Justified	Gerald Johns	3 episodes
2013	Under The Dome	Reverend Lester Coggins	4 episodes
2014	Criminal Minds	Alan Anderson	Episode: "Mr. and Mrs Anderson"
2014	Resurrection	Samuel Catlin	3 episodes
2016	Gotham	Warden Carlson Grey	Episode: "Wrath of the Villains: Prisoners"
2017	Chicago P.D.	Arlen Pfister	Episode: "Last Minute Resistance"
2021	Paradise City	Ross	Recurring role
