= Aurelia E. Brazeal =

American diplomat

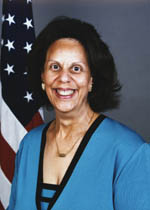

United States Ambassador to Ethiopia
- In office November 20, 2002 – September 2, 2005
- President: George W. Bush
- Preceded by: Tibor P. Nagy
- Succeeded by: Donald Yamamoto

United States Ambassador to Kenya
- In office August 9, 1993 – September 11, 1996
- President: Bill Clinton
- Preceded by: Smith Hempstone, Jr.
- Succeeded by: Prudence Bushnell

United States Ambassador to the Federated States of Micronesia
- In office August 6, 1990 – July 6, 1993
- President: George H. W. Bush
- Preceded by: position established
- Succeeded by: March Fong Eu

Personal details
- Born: November 24, 1943 (age 82) Chicago
- Education: Spelman College; Columbia University; Harvard University

Aurelia Erskine Brazeal (born 1943) is a retired American diplomat who served as United States Ambassador to the Federated States of Micronesia, United States Ambassador to Kenya and United States Ambassador to Ethiopia.

== Early life and education ==
Brazeal was born November 24, 1943, in Chicago, and grew up in Atlanta, one of two daughters of Brailsford Reese Brazeal and Ernestine Vivian Erskine Brazeal. Her father was an educator and economist, and B.R. Brazeal Hall at Morehouse College is named in his honor. Brazeal completed her secondary education at Northfield School for Girls, now Northfield Mount Hermon School.

She earned a B.A. degree in political science at Spelman College in 1965. In 1967, she also earned a master's degree in International Affairs at Columbia University. Later, she completed post-graduate study at Harvard University.

== Career ==
Brazeal joined the U.S. Foreign Service in 1968. Her initial assignment was as an economic officer in the Bureau of Economic and Business Affairs at the Department of State focused on creating ways to promote a market economy and democracy in South America and Southeast Asia.

She was then assigned as a Consular and Economic Officer Argentina, where she served from 1969 to 1971. Her next assignments were in the State Department's Economic Bureau and the Department of State Operations Center.

Her next two assignments took her to international locations. From 1974 to 1981, she served in the U.S. Embassies in Uruguay and Paraguay and Japan.

In 1982 she returned to Washington, D.C., assigned to the State Department offices there, including an assignment as deputy director for Economics, which she held from 1984 to 1986. She then completed a two-year assignment as a Senior Seminar member at the Foreign Service Institute in Arlington, VA. She then returned to Japan, where she served from 1987 to 1990 at the Tokyo Embassy.

On June 6, 1990, President George H. W. Bush announced his intention to nominate Brazeal as U.S. Ambassador to the Federated States of Micronesia. While the U.S. had had a representative to Micronesia, Michael Wygant, in 1989 the Office of the U.S. Representative was upgraded to Embassy status and the position of Representative was upgraded to Ambassador Extraordinary and Plenipotentiary, so when the Senate approved her nomination, Brazeal became the first U.S. Ambassador to the country, and the first female African American Foreign Service employee to rise to the senior ranks.

Because of her success, President Bill Clinton nominated her to become U.S. Ambassador to Kenya, a role she filled from 1993 to 1996. She was handed the challenge of reducing the tension that had arisen between Kenya and her predecessor, Ambassador Smith Hempstone, while still pressing for economic and political reform. Tensions remained, however. The Moi government threatened to expel Time, Newsweek and The Washington Post journalists from the country, and even briefly detained Brazeal herself.

Brazeal then became Deputy Assistant Secretary of State for East Asia and the Pacific, a position she held from 1996 until 1998, and which involved sharing her knowledge of the region with Congress as the U.S. treaty with the Marshall Islands came up for review. In 1998 she became Dean of Senior Seminar and the first Dean of the Leadership and Management School at the Foreign Service Institute, a role she held 2002.

On June 14, 2002, U.S. President George W. Bush announced his intention to nominate Brazeal as U.S. Ambassador to Ethiopia, making her the first African American woman ever to be named to the post of U.S. Ambassador by three different presidents. She was confirmed by the Senate and served in Ethiopia until 2005.

From 2005 to 2008, Brazeal served the Senior Foreign Service as Career Minister. At the same time, she held appointments as Distinguished Visiting Ambassador and Diplomat-in-Residence at Howard University. Brazeal retired in 2008, having served for 41 years in the Foreign Service.

Following her retirement Ambassador Brazeal has remained engaged in public service. She has served as President of the Association of Black American Ambassadors (ABAA), and as a member of the Council on Foreign Relations, the Washington Institute of Foreign Affairs, the Foreign Affairs Council, and the Association for Diplomatic Studies and Training.

Diplomatic posts
Preceded by post created	United States Ambassador to Micronesia; 1990–1993	Succeeded by March Fong Eu
Preceded by Smith Hempstone, Jr.	United States Ambassador to Kenya; 1993–1996	Succeeded by Prudence Bushnell
Preceded by Tibor P. Nagy	United States Ambassador to Ethiopia; 2002–2005	Succeeded by Donald Yamamoto
