= Johnnie Carson =

American diplomat (born 1943)

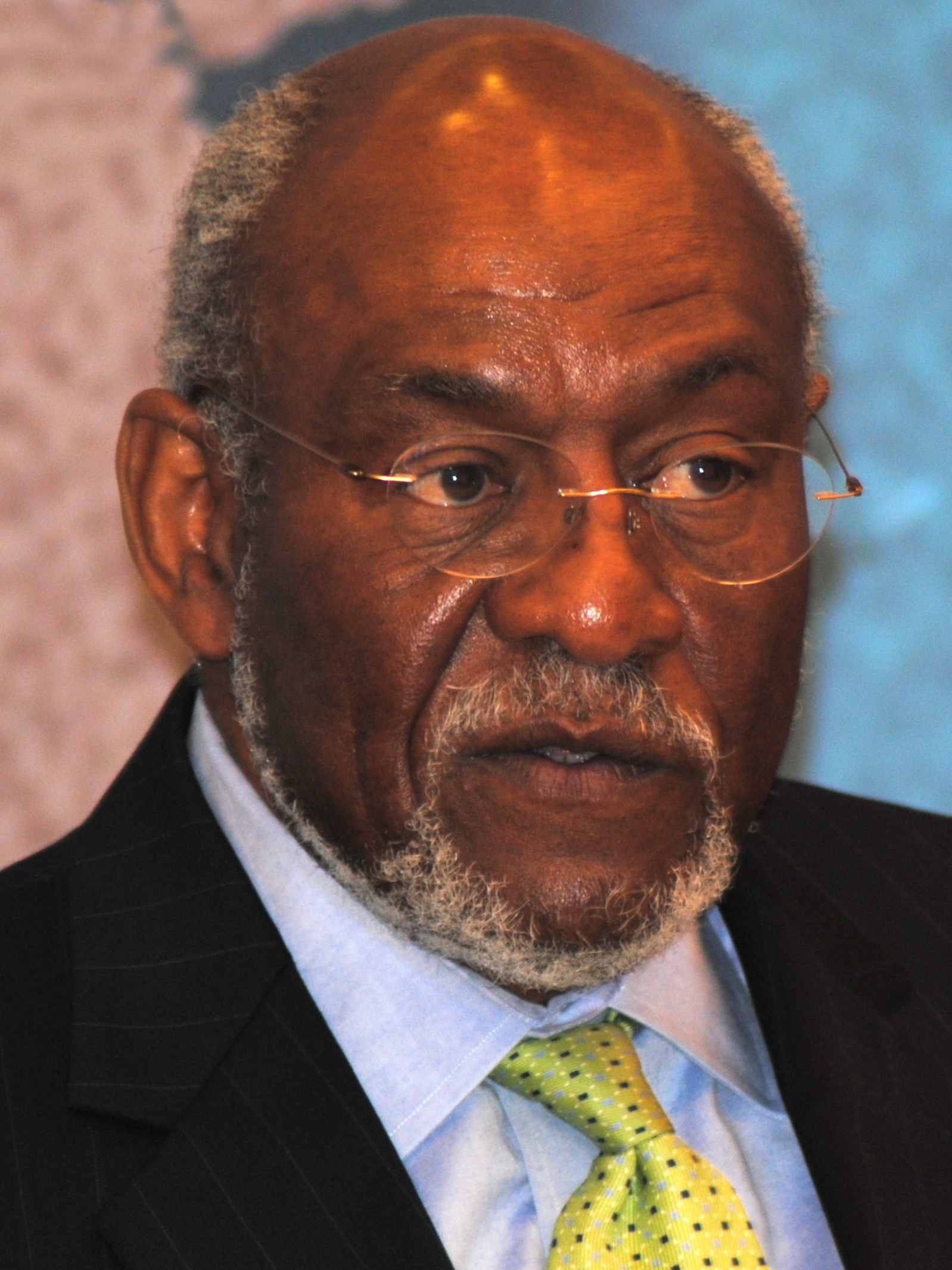

16th United States Assistant Secretary of State for African Affairs
- In office May 7, 2009 – March 29, 2013
- President: Barack Obama
- Preceded by: Jendayi Frazer
- Succeeded by: Linda Thomas-Greenfield

United States Ambassador to Kenya
- In office September 23, 1999 – July 6, 2003
- President: Bill Clinton; George W. Bush
- Preceded by: Prudence Bushnell
- Succeeded by: William M. Bellamy

United States Ambassador to Zimbabwe
- In office April 20, 1995 – July 25, 1997
- President: Bill Clinton
- Preceded by: Edward G. Lanpher
- Succeeded by: Tom McDonald

United States Ambassador to Uganda
- In office September 18, 1991 – August 9, 1994
- President: George H. W. Bush; Bill Clinton
- Preceded by: John A. Burroughs, Jr.
- Succeeded by: E. Michael Southwick

Personal details
- Born: April 7, 1943 (age 83) Chicago, Illinois, U.S.
- Children: 3
- Profession: Diplomat

Johnnie Carson (born April 7, 1943) is an American diplomat who has served as United States Ambassador to several African nations. In 2009 he was nominated to become U.S. Assistant Secretary of State for African Affairs by President Barack Obama. He resigned in 2013 after four years in the role and following the resignation of Secretary of State Hillary Clinton. He is currently a Senior Advisor at Albright Stonebridge Group.

== Background ==
Carson was born April 7, 1943, in Chicago, Illinois. Carson is married, has three children, and resides in Reston, Virginia. He graduated from Drake University with a B.A. in History and Political Science in 1965 and later obtained a Master of Arts in International Relations from the School of Oriental and African Studies, University of London in 1975. Before joining the Foreign Service, Carson was a Peace Corps volunteer in Tanzania from 1965 to 1968.

== Foreign service career ==
Carson joined the United States National Intelligence Council as National Intelligence Officer for Africa in September 2006 after a 37-year career in Foreign Service. Prior to this appointment, Carson served as the Senior Vice President of the National Defense University in Washington D.C. (2003–2006). Carson's Foreign Service career includes ambassadorships to Kenya (1999–2003), Zimbabwe (1995–1997), and Uganda (1991–1994); and Principal Deputy Assistant Secretary for the Bureau of African Affairs (1997–1999).

Earlier in his career he had assignments in Portugal (1982–1986), Botswana (1986–1990), Mozambique (1975–1978), and Nigeria (1969–1971). He has also served as desk officer in the Africa section at State's Bureau of Intelligence and Research (1971–1974); Staff Officer for the Secretary of State (1978–1979), and Staff Director for the Africa Subcommittee of the US House of Representatives (1979–1982).

Carson is the recipient of several Superior Honor Awards from the Department of State and a Meritorious Service Award from Secretary of State Madeleine Albright. The Centers for Disease Control presented Ambassador Carson its highest award, "Champion of Prevention Award", for his leadership in directing the US Government's HIV/AIDS prevention efforts in Kenya. Upon his departure from the assistant secretaryship, Carson was given accolades from the ambassadors of the ECOWAS countries, who together praised him for extraordinary efforts to bind the United States together with their countries.

== Assistant Secretary of State ==
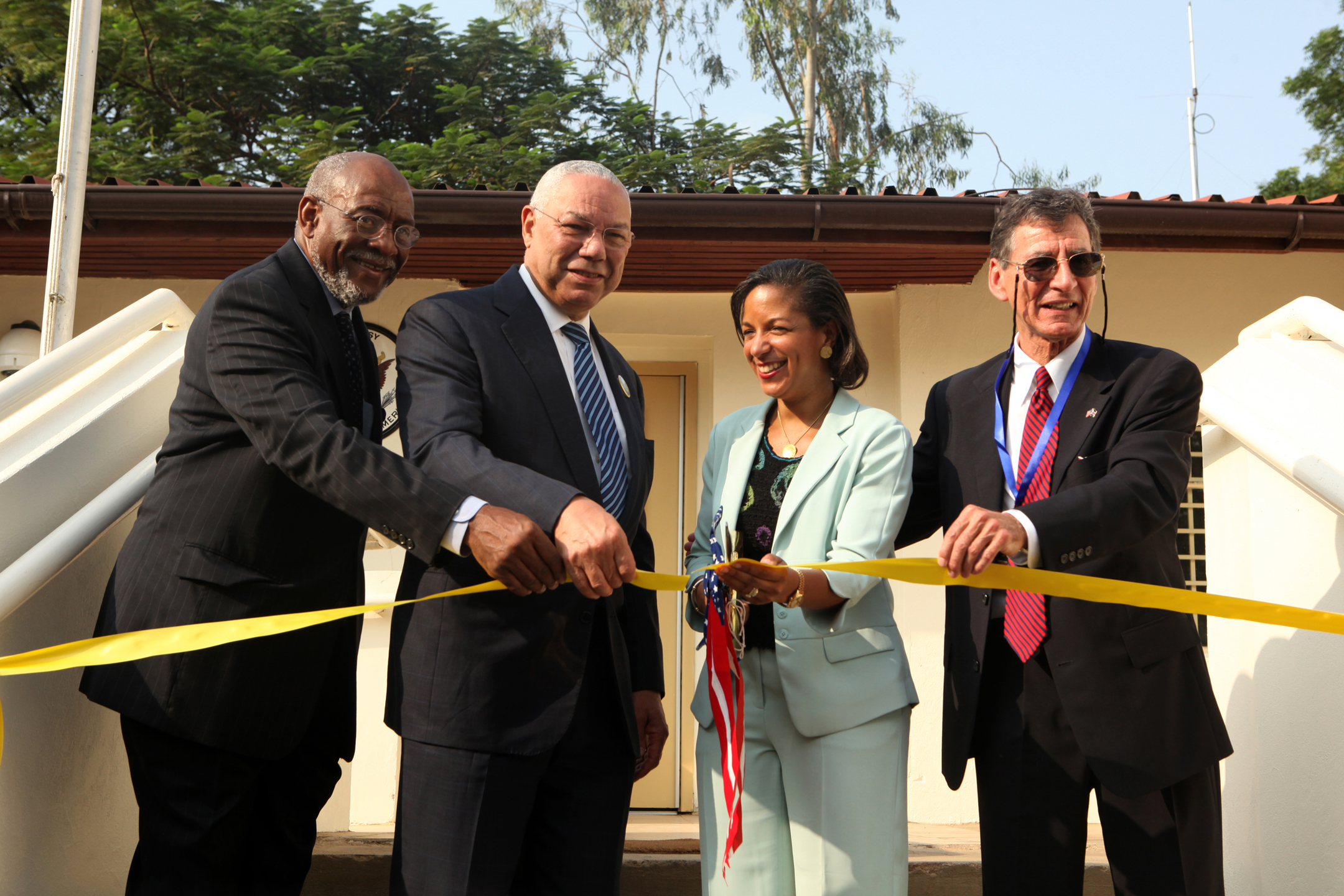
Johnnie Carson (left), along with Colin Powell, Susan Rice, and R. Barrie Walkley, inaugurating the new US Embassy in Juba, South Sudan, July 9, 2011

In March 2009, Carson was nominated to become U.S. Assistant Secretary of State for African Affairs by President Barack Obama. In February 2013, Carson said of the Kenyan elections that the US wasn't officially backing any candidate, but "choices have consequences," reportedly contradicting President Obama's office after Obama said the decision was "up to the Kenyan people."

In March 2013, it was reported that Carson would be stepping down from his post after serving for four years. In May 2013, Carson joined the United States Institute of Peace as a senior adviser. Carson also serves on the Board of Directors of the National Democratic Institute.

On January 15, 2015, he urged increased engagement with Nigeria for both the US and European partners, to assist in maintaining stability in the light of the upcoming 2015 Nigerian general election, security problems in Northeastern Nigeria, and economic concerns regarding rising oil prices.

Diplomatic posts
Preceded by John A. Burroughs, Jr.	United States Ambassador to Uganda; 1991–1994	Succeeded by E. Michael Southwick
Preceded by Edward G. Lanpher	United States Ambassador to Zimbabwe; 1995–1997	Succeeded by Tom McDonald
Preceded by Prudence Bushnell	United States Ambassador to Kenya; 1999–2003	Succeeded by William M. Bellamy
Political offices
Preceded by Jendayi Frazer; Phillip Carter; Acting	United States Assistant Secretary of State for African Affairs; 2009–2013	Succeeded by Linda Thomas-Greenfield
