= Prudence Bushnell =

American diplomat (born 1946)

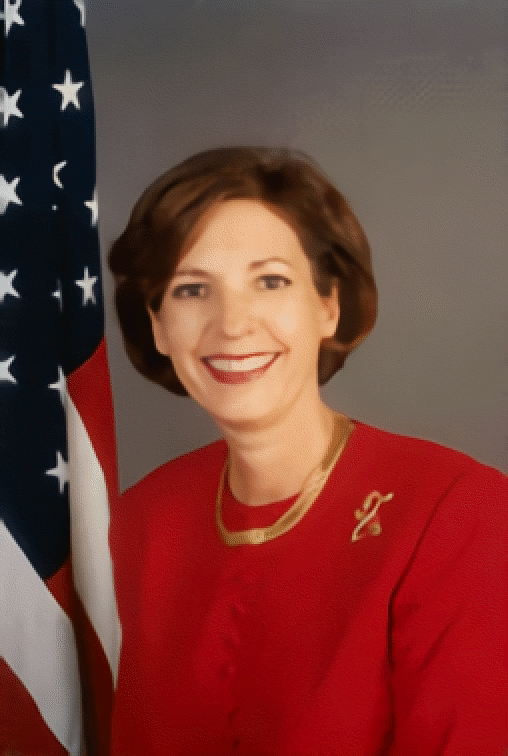

United States Ambassador to Kenya
- In office 1996–1999
- President: Bill Clinton
- Preceded by: Aurelia E. Brazeal
- Succeeded by: Johnnie Carson

Personal details
- Born: 1946 (age 79–80) Washington, D.C.
- Education: University of Maryland; Russell Sage College

Prudence Bushnell (born 1946) is an American diplomat who served as the United States Ambassador to Kenya from 1996 to 1999 and as United States Ambassador to Guatemala from 1999 to 2002.

== Early life and education ==
Bushnell was born in Washington D.C. in 1946. Her father was a career member of the United States Foreign Service and as a result of her family's travels, she grew up in Iran, Germany, France and Pakistan. After obtaining a Bachelor's Degree from the University of Maryland, Bushnell received a graduate degree from Russell Sage College in Troy, New York.

== Career ==
Following graduation, Bushnell went to work as a management consultant in Texas. She joined the foreign service in 1981 as an administrative track officer, with her first assignment being in Bombay, India. She then served as Deputy Chief of Mission under Ambassador George Moose at the U.S. Embassy in Dakar, Senegal.

=== State Department and Rwanda 1994 genocide against Tutsi ===
In 1993, Ambassador Moose was appointed Assistant Secretary of State for African Affairs by President Bill Clinton. Bushnell accompanied Moose to serve as Deputy Assistant Secretary. Bushnell's time in Washington was marked by extreme tension in Africa. On October 3, 1993, 18 U.S. soldiers were killed and 73 wounded in an attempt to apprehend warlord Mohamed Farrah Aidid at the Battle of Mogadishu in Somalia. The American public was appalled at the deaths and support for American involvement in African affairs suffered as a result. It was against this backdrop that the Rwandan genocide began. On April 6, 1994, Rwandan President Juvénal Habyarimana and Cyprien Ntaryamira, the President of Burundi, were both killed when their plane was shot down on approach to Kigali Airport in Rwanda. Responsibility for the assassinations has never been clearly established, however, the resulting chaos was the catalyst for the massacre of Tutsis at the hands of Rwanda's Hutu majority.

Bushnell, who had been visiting the area just weeks before, released a memorandum immediately following the assassinations. In it, she predicted widespread violence and the military take-over of the Rwandan government and urged the U.S. government to take action to maintain order. Partly as a result of the Somali incident, the U.S. government chose not to heed Bushnell's recommendations, and on the next day, April 7, the Rwandan genocide began when several Tutsi government officials and moderate Hutu Prime Minister Agathe Uwilingiyimana were killed by Hutu militias.

Bushnell began calling Rwandan military officials in an attempt to persuade them to cease the slaughter. Without a military commitment, however, her pleas for a stop to the violence fell on deaf ears. On April 29, 1994, Bushnell spoke with Colonel Théoneste Bagosora, a Rwandan military official who had been identified as a leader of the genocide. She warned him that the State Department was aware of the violence and called for an end to the massacres. Bagosora was eventually arrested and sentenced to 35 years imprisonment for his role in the genocide.

Bushnell's attempts to stop the genocide and her conversations with Bagosora are dramatised in the 2004 film Sometimes in April. Actress Debra Winger portrayed Bushnell in the film.

=== Kenyan Embassy bombing ===
Bushnell remained Deputy Assistant Secretary until being nominated by President Clinton to serve as Ambassador to Kenya in 1996. Upon confirmation by the United States Senate, Bushnell took up residence in Nairobi. Bushnell used her office to push Kenyan President Daniel arap Moi to institute democratic reforms and to root out corruption in his government, a major drag on Kenya's economy. Bushnell was also alarmed at the vulnerability of the U.S. embassy compound to attack. For over two years, she complained about security conditions to her superiors in Washington. In spite of Bushnell's request for a new building, a State Department evaluation team concluded that a renovation would suffice. Bushnell's fears proved to be well founded when on August 7, 1998 a car bomb was detonated next to the embassy by al-Qaeda agents.

At the time of the bombing, Bushnell was attending a meeting with the Kenyan Trade Minister, Joseph J.Kamotho in the Cooperative Bank Building next to the embassy. She was knocked unconscious by the blast and badly cut by flying glass. Upon regaining consciousness a few minutes later, Bushnell was evacuated to a nearby hotel where she received medical treatment and began overseeing rescue operations. Ultimately, 12 embassy staff were killed along with 212 Kenyans and 4,000 people were injured. Additionally, another car bomb exploded simultaneously in Dar es Salaam, Tanzania, killing 11 and wounding 85. In the weeks following the bombings, Bushnell was the target of some criticism in the Kenyan press for not allowing Kenyan civilians to participate in search and rescue operations. She responded by appearing on Kenyan state television to point out the inherent danger the devastated compound posed to untrained searchers and the need to preserve evidence.

In 2001, four al-Qaeda agents, including Wadih El-Hage, the leader of the cell that planned the attack, were put on trial in New York City. Bushnell was a witness for the prosecution. At the end of the trial, all four men were convicted and sentenced to life imprisonment. Several conspirators remain at large however. Osama bin Laden, former leader of al-Qaeda, was indicted in 1998 for his role in ordering the attacks. He was killed on April 30, 2011, in Pakistan.

=== Guatemala ===
Bushnell was nominated by President Clinton in 1999 to serve as U.S. Ambassador to Guatemala. She was sworn into that position on August 5, 1999 by U.S. Secretary of State Madeleine Albright. While ambassador, Bushnell sought to boost Guatemala's participation in organic and specialty coffees following a worldwide drop in coffee prices. Of her position as Ambassador, she said:

I think that my getting out in the countryside, letting people see me, puts a human face on the mystique of the United States of America. Every now and then you touch somebody, and somebody touches you. It is extraordinary to overcome race, culture, language, sometimes gender, economic issues, and simply connect as human beings. What is extraordinary about being an ambassador is that you have the power of the United States Government to make a difference.

=== S.M.A.R.T. Policies ===
These are policies that are Strategic, Moral, Achievable, Reliable, and Transformational. Bushnell conceived this framework for examining approaches to global challenges in the wake of her book about the 1998 al Qaeda terrorist attacks. Two decades of “hard” power wars have not deterred terrorist tactics. Ambassador's Bushnell provides an example of a S.M.A.R.T. in her article, "Operation Vittles" found in the May 2019 Issue of Journal of American Diplomacy. Ambassador Bushnell also references the failures of diplomatic actions during the Rwandan genocide in an article published in The Brown Journal of World Affairs.

== Personal life ==
Bushnell resigned as U.S. Ambassador to Guatemala in July 2002 to become Dean of the Leadership and Management School at the Foreign Service Institute, a position she no longer holds. In 2004, she was the recipient of the Career Achievement Award, a Service to America Medal. She is married to lawyer and playwright Richard Buckley and has five stepchildren.

Diplomatic posts
Preceded by Aurelia E. Brazeal	United States Ambassador to Kenya; 1996–1999	Succeeded by Johnnie Carson
