= List of ambassadors of the United States to Kenya =

Ambassador of the United States to Kenya
- Seal of the United States Department of State

- Flag of a United States ambassador

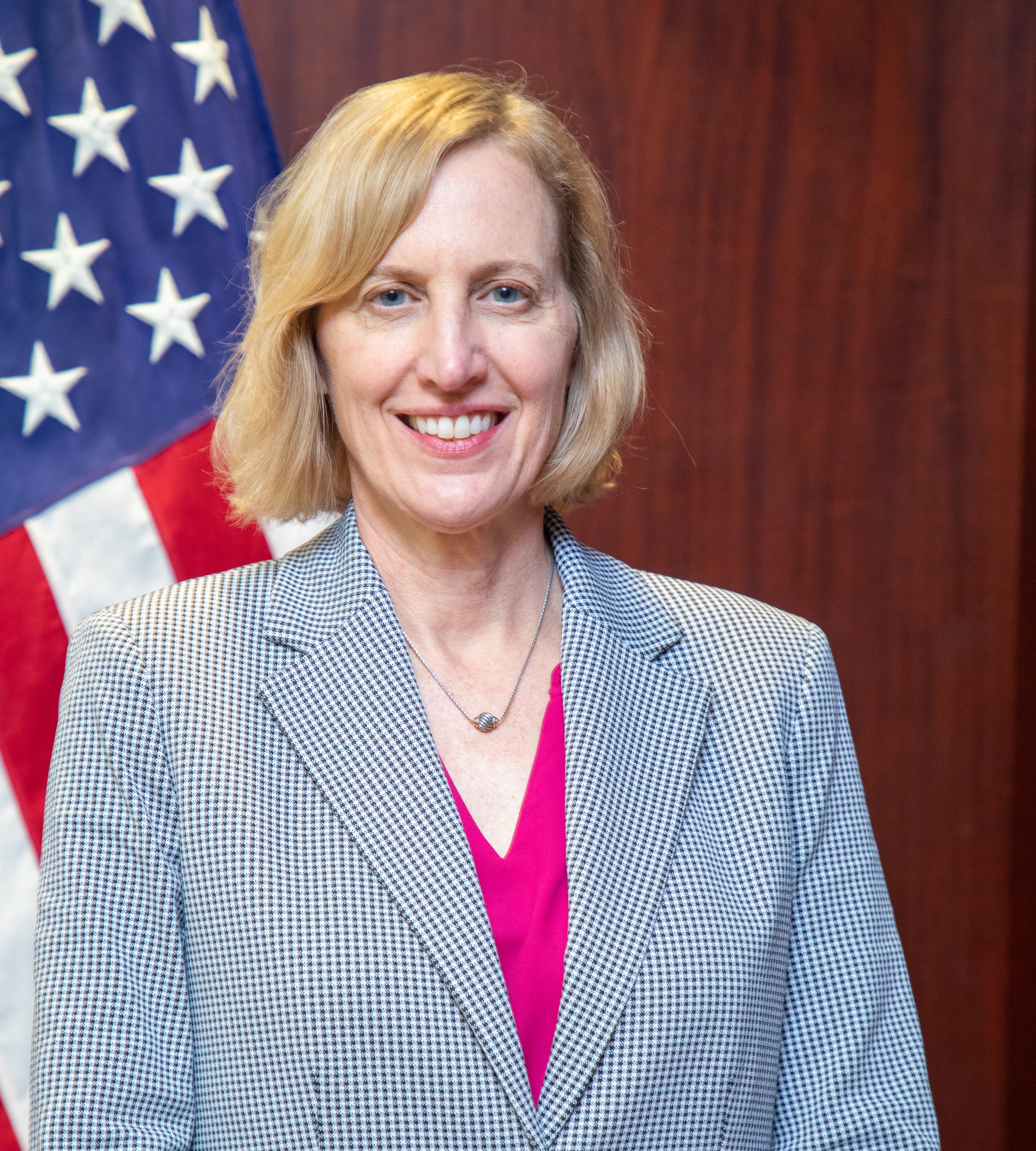
- Incumbent; Susan M. Burns; Chargé d'affaires since August 25, 2025
- Nominator: The president of the United States
- Appointer: The president with Senate advice and consent
- Inaugural holder: Laurence C. Vass as Chargé d'Affaires ad interim
- Formation: February 20, 1964
- Website: U.S. Embassy - Nairobi

The United States ambassador to Kenya is the most senior diplomatic representative of the United States federal government assigned to Kenya. After Kenya's independence on December 12, 1963, the United States immediately recognized the new nation and moved to establish diplomatic relations. The embassy in Nairobi was established December 12, 1963—Kenya's independence day—with Laurence C. Vass as chargé d’affaires ad interim pending the appointment of an ambassador.

== Ambassadors ==
Name	Title	Appointed	Presented credentials	Terminated mission	Notes
William Attwood – Political appointee	Ambassador Extraordinary and Plenipotentiary	February 20, 1964	March 2, 1964	May 1, 1966	
Glenn W. Ferguson – Political appointee	Ambassador Extraordinary and Plenipotentiary	September 16, 1966	November 4, 1966	April 7, 1969	
Robinson McIlvaine – Career FSO	Ambassador Extraordinary and Plenipotentiary	September 15, 1969	September 30, 1969	April 4, 1973	
Anthony D. Marshall – Political appointee	Ambassador Extraordinary and Plenipotentiary	December 19, 1973	January 22, 1974	April 26, 1977	
Wilbert John LeMelle – Political appointee	Ambassador Extraordinary and Plenipotentiary	May 11, 1977	August 10, 1977	June 28, 1980	
William Caldwell Harrop – Career FSO	Ambassador Extraordinary and Plenipotentiary	May 23, 1980	July 10, 1980	September 1, 1983	
Gerald Eustis Thomas – Political appointee	Ambassador Extraordinary and Plenipotentiary	October 7, 1983	November 9, 1983	September 29, 1986	
Elinor Greer Constable – Career FSO	Ambassador Extraordinary and Plenipotentiary	October 16, 1986	December 11, 1986	September 29, 1989	
Smith Hempstone, Jr. – Political appointee	Ambassador Extraordinary and Plenipotentiary	November 6, 1989	December 7, 1989	February 26, 1993	
Aurelia E. Brazeal – Career FSO	Ambassador Extraordinary and Plenipotentiary	August 9, 1993	September 21, 1993	September 11, 1996	
Prudence Bushnell – Career FSO	Ambassador Extraordinary and Plenipotentiary	June 11, 1996	September 2, 1996	May 22, 1999	
Johnnie Carson – Career FSO	Ambassador Extraordinary and Plenipotentiary	July 7, 1999	September 23, 1999	July 6, 2003	
William M. Bellamy – Career FSO	Ambassador Extraordinary and Plenipotentiary	April 16, 2003	September 9, 2003	June 25, 2006	
Michael Ranneberger – Career FSO	Ambassador Extraordinary and Plenipotentiary	July 5, 2006	August 23, 2006	May 4, 2011	
Scott Gration – Political appointee	Ambassador Extraordinary and Plenipotentiary	April 18, 2011	May 18, 2011	July 23, 2012	
Robert F. Godec – Career FSO	Ambassador Extraordinary and Plenipotentiary	January 16, 2013	February 15, 2013	February 1, 2019	
Kyle McCarter – Political appointee	Ambassador Extraordinary and Plenipotentiary	January 2, 2019	March 12, 2019	January 20, 2021	
Meg Whitman – Political appointee	Ambassador Extraordinary and Plenipotentiary	December 8, 2021	August 5, 2022	November 13, 2024	
Marc Dillard – Career FSO	Chargé d'affaires ad interim	November 13, 2024		July 21, 2025	
Carla Benini – Career FSO	Chargé d'affaires ad interim	July 21, 2025		August 25, 2025	
Susan M. Burns – Career FSO	Chargé d'affaires ad interim	August 25, 2025		Present	

== See also ==
- Kenya – United States relations
- Foreign relations of Kenya
- Ambassadors of the United States
