= Edward R. Murrow Award for Excellence in Public Diplomacy =

The Edward R. Murrow Award for Excellence in Public Diplomacy is an award given annually to a U.S. State Department employee for significant contributions in the field of public diplomacy. This award is the State Department's highest award for public diplomacy work. It is accompanied by a plaque by the Fletcher School at Tufts University.

== Award origins ==
The Edward R. Murrow Award for Excellence in Public Diplomacy was established in 1965 or 1966 by an ad-hoc committee of officials with the United States Information Agency (USIA) and funded through voluntary contributions by employees for the establishment of "The Murrow-USIA Fund." Following the merger of USIA with the Department of State, the award has been administered by the Department. The Washington Post reported in 2006 that "the award, named for the legendary journalist who went on to head the U.S. Information Agency, is given to a State Department employee 'who best exemplifies the standards of dedication, integrity, courage, sensitivity and excellence in the field of public diplomacy.'"

== Nomination and selection ==
Any State Department employee may nominate an employee for the Edward R. Murrow Award, and the nomination must be signed by the supervisor and endorsed by the chief of mission if the nominee is posted overseas or by the applicable bureau's Deputy Assistant Secretary or higher. The Under Secretary for Public Diplomacy and Public Affairs chairs the selection committee, which includes at least four additional members who occupy senior public diplomacy positions in the Department.

The selection committee bases its decision on three criteria:

- Integrity of character and adherence to firm standards of truth and principle;
- Sustained outstanding performance and good judgment under challenging conditions;
- Specific and identifiable contributions to advancing U.S. foreign policy through public diplomacy.

== Recipients ==
Recipients of the Edward R. Murrow Award receive a cash award of $10,000, a certificate signed by the Secretary of State and presented at the Department of State's annual awards ceremony, and a plaque presented by the Fletcher School, Tufts University. Recipients include:

- 2024: Jennifer Palmer
- 2023: Benjamin Lingeman
- 2022: Daniel Langenkamp
- 2021: Lorie Nierenberg
- 2020: Jeffrey Weinshenker
- 2019: Laura E. Brown
- 2015: Stephanie Syptak-Ramnath
- 2014: Matthew A. Baum
- 2013: Will Stevens
- 2012: Gloria Berbena
- 2011: D. Bruce Wharton
- 2006: Alberto M. Fernandez
- 1995: Donna Marie Blatt Oglesby
- 1979: Jay Warner Gildner
- 1974: Richard Holden Curtiss
- 1966: Reed Harris
