= Pamela Tremont =

American diplomat

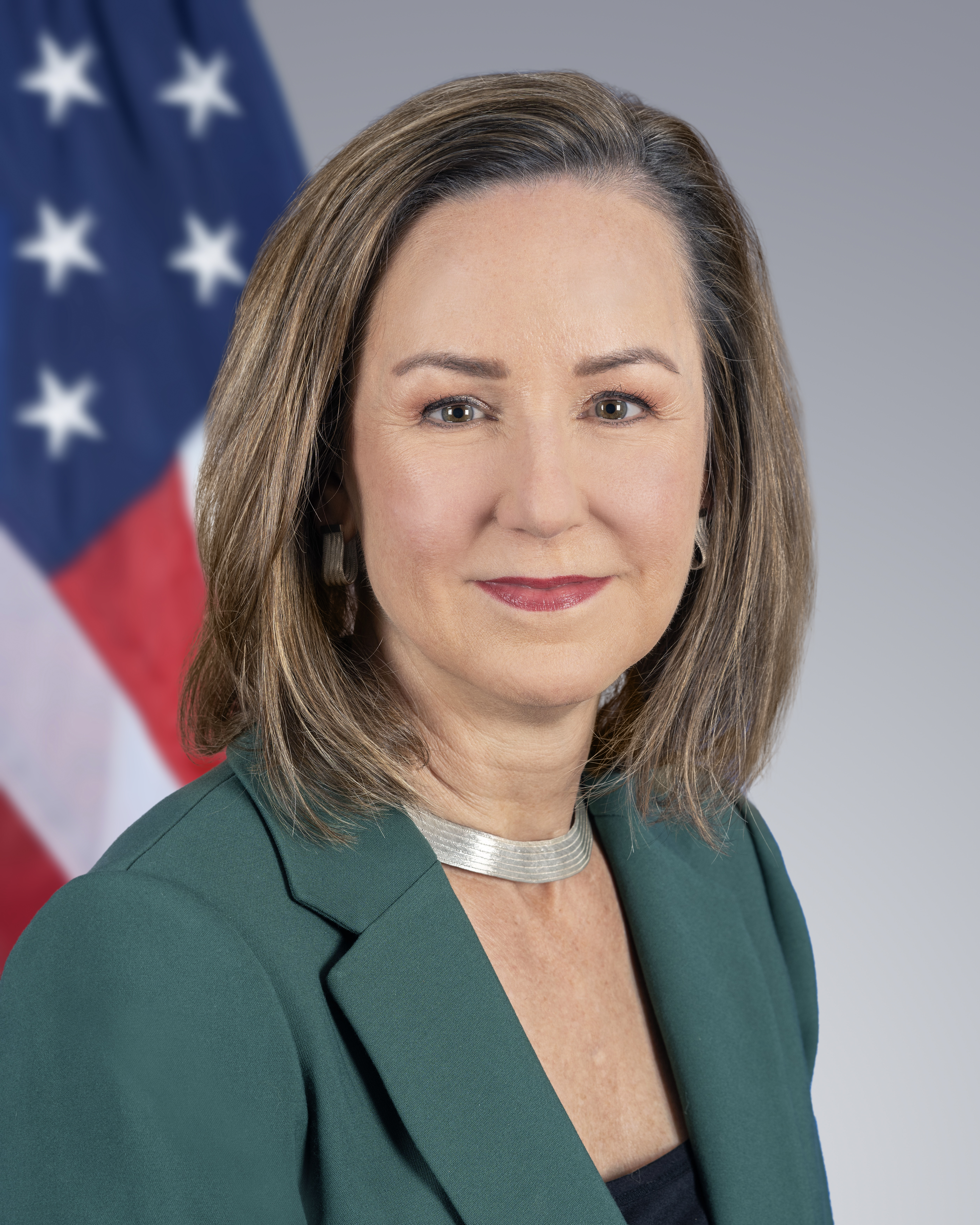

United States Ambassador to Zimbabwe
- Incumbent
- Assumed office July 17, 2024
- President: Joe Biden; Donald Trump
- Preceded by: Brian A. Nichols (2021)

Personal details
- Education: Baylor University (BA, MA); Dwight D. Eisenhower School for National Security and Resource Strategy (MA)

Pamela Marie Tremont is an American diplomat who has served as the United States ambassador to Zimbabwe since 2024.

== Early life and education ==
Tremont earned a Bachelor of Arts and Master of Arts from Baylor University and a master's degree from the Dwight D. Eisenhower School at the National Defense University.

== Career ==
Tremont is a career member of the Senior Foreign Service, with the rank of Minister-Counselor. She was previously deputy chief of mission at the U.S. embassy in Stockholm, serving as its Chargé d'affaires for 18 months. Previously, Tremont worked in the U.S. embassy in Kyiv, Ukraine as well as the U.S. embassy in Nicosia, Cyprus. Other assignments include deputy director for NATO Policy in the Bureau of European and Eurasian Affairs at the State Department, the political/economic counselor at the U.S. embassy in Lusaka, Zambia, and a political military officer in the U.S. embassy in London, United Kingdom. Tremont also served as a political military officer at the U.S. embassy in Ankara, Turkey, as a desk officer for South Africa in the Bureau of African Affairs, and as a watch officer in the State Department's Operations Center.

=== U.S. ambassador to Zimbabwe ===
On June 22, 2022, President Joe Biden nominated Tremont to be the next ambassador to Zimbabwe. Her nomination was returned to President Biden on January 3, 2023 as no action was taken on it for the rest of the year.

President Biden renominated Tremont the same day. Hearings on her nomination were held before the Senate Foreign Relations Committee on March 1, 2023. The committee favorably reported her nomination on May 3, 2023. She was confirmed by the U.S. Senate by voice vote on May 2, 2024 and sworn in as ambassador on June 10, 2024. She presented her credentials to President Emmerson Mnangagwa on July 17, 2024.

== Personal life ==
Tremont speaks French and Turkish.

Diplomatic posts
Preceded by Brian A. Nichols	United States Ambassador to Zimbabwe; 2024–present	Incumbent
