= J. Steven Rhodes =

American diplomat

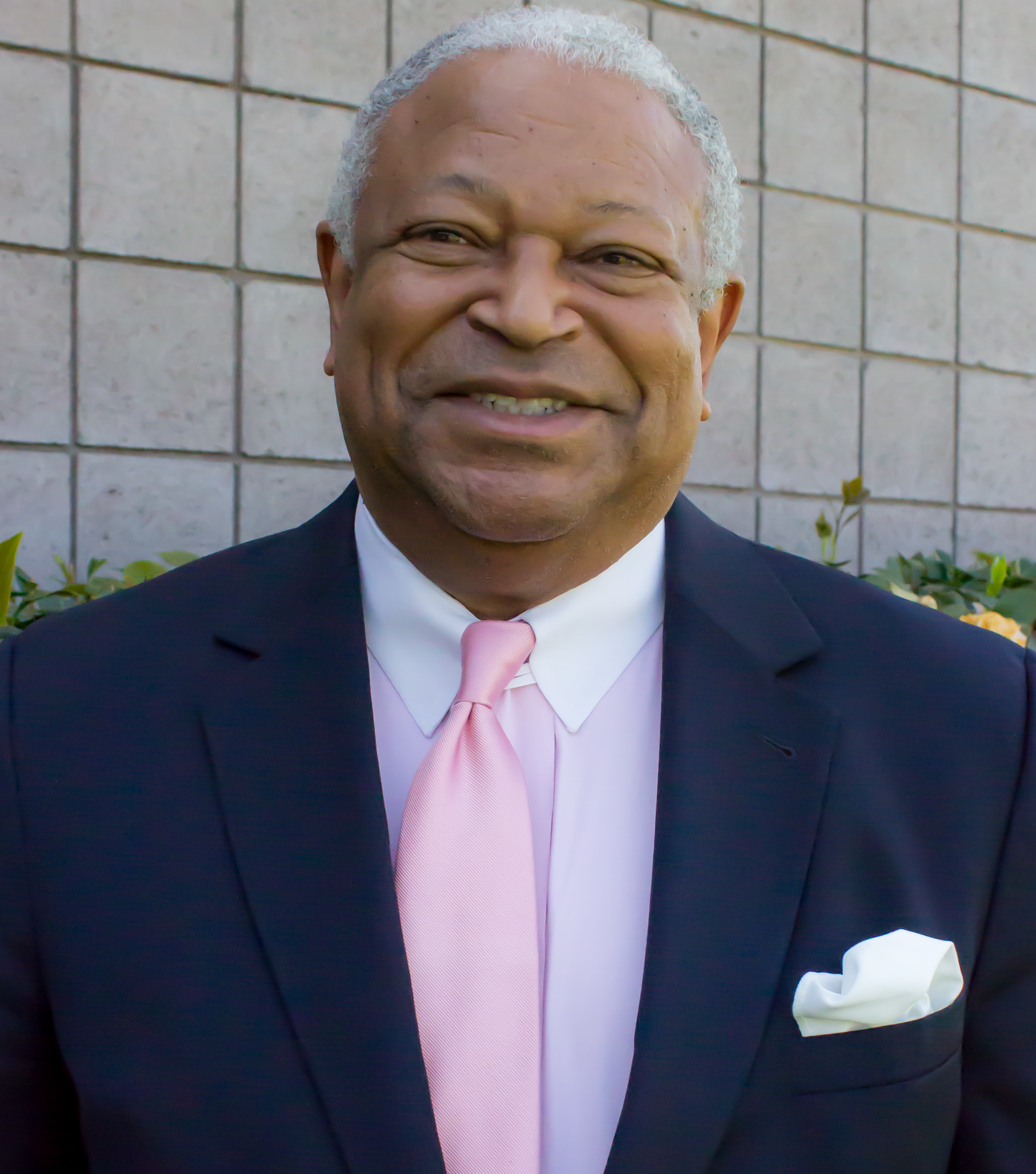
J Steven Rhodes

J. Steven Rhodes (born September 29, 1951, New Orleans, Louisiana) was Ronald Reagan's special assistant for intergovernmental affairs, Vice President George H. W. Bush's chief domestic affairs adviser and ambassador to the Republic of Zimbabwe when Bush became president. Rhodes is an adjunct professor in the Negotiation, Conflict Resolution and Peace Building Department at California State University, Dominguez Hills.

== Career ==
He worked at Dart Industries from 1973, rising to become Director of Government Affairs.

Rhodes was Managing Partner of Claiborne-Rhodes International, LLC (in 2015, he was Chairman and CEO) and a member of the Board of Governors for the California Community Colleges System (appointed in 2004 by Governor Arnold Schwarzenegger).

Rhodes received a Masters of Business Administration, Marketing emphasis from Pepperdine University and a Bachelors of Business Administration, Industrial Relations concentration from Loyola Marymount University in Los Angeles.

Rhodes was confirmed by the Senate as ambassador to the Republic of Zimbabwe in March 1990, and submitted his resignation to President Bush in October 1990, following an "incident involving drugs", according to a State department official.
