= Edward G. Lanpher =

American diplomat

Edward Gibson Lanpher (born December 8, 1942 Richmond, Virginia) was an American Career Foreign Service Officer who served as the Ambassador Extraordinary and Plenipotentiary to Zimbabwe (1991–1995).

Lanpher grew up in Alexandria, Virginia and attended the Burgundy Farm Country Day School which was the first racially integrated school in Virginia, Phillips Academy and Brown University.
