= Ethiopia–United States relations =

- Ethiopia: United States

Diplomatic mission
- Embassy of Ethiopia, Washington, D.C.: Embassy of the United States, Addis Ababa

Envoy
- Ethiopia Ambassador to the United States Seleshi Bekele: Ambassador Ervin Jose Massinga

Ethiopia–United States relations are bilateral relations between Ethiopia and the United States. Ethiopia is a strategic partner of the United States in the Global War on Terrorism. The United States is the largest donor to Ethiopia: in 2008 U.S. foreign aid to Ethiopia totaled US$969 million, in 2009 $916 million, with 2010 estimated at $513 million and $586 million requested for 2011. U.S. development assistance to Ethiopia is focused on reducing poverty and supporting economic development emphasizes economic, governance, and social sector policy reforms. Some military training funds, including training in such issues as the laws of war and observance of human rights, also are provided.

Recently, the Ethiopian government has been criticized for severe human rights violations. According to Human Rights Watch, the aid given by the United States is being abused to erode democracy in Ethiopia. However, in September 2020, the United States suspended part of its economic assistance to Ethiopia due to the lack of sufficient progress in negotiations with Sudan and Egypt over the construction of the Grand Ethiopian Renaissance Dam.

The current ambassador of Ethiopia to the United States is Fitsum Arega; he is also accredited to Canada and Mexico. Principal U.S. officials include Ambassador Michael A. Raynor and Deputy Chief of Mission Troy Fitrell. The U.S. Embassy in Ethiopia is located in Addis Ababa.

According to the 2016 U.S. Global Leadership Report, 29% of Ethiopians approve of U.S. leadership, with 4% disapproving and 67% uncertain.

== 20th century ==
U.S.-Ethiopian relations were established in 1903, after nine days of meetings in Ethiopia between Emperor Menelik II and Robert P. Skinner, an emissary of President Theodore Roosevelt. This first step was augmented with treaties of arbitration and conciliation signed at Addis Ababa 26 January 1929. These formal relations included a grant of Most Favored Nation status, and were good up to the attempted Italian occupation in 1935.

Warqenah Eshate, while visiting the United States in 1927, visited Harlem, where he delivered Ras Tafari's greetings to the African-American community and Tafari's invitation to skilled African Americans to settle in Ethiopia. A number of African-Americans did travel to Ethiopia, such as John Robinson who became the commander of the Ethiopian Air force, where they played a number of roles in the modernization of the country before the Italian attempted conquest in 1935.

In his autobiography, Emperor Haile Selassie notes that the United States was one of only five countries which refused to recognize the Italian attempted conquest of his country.

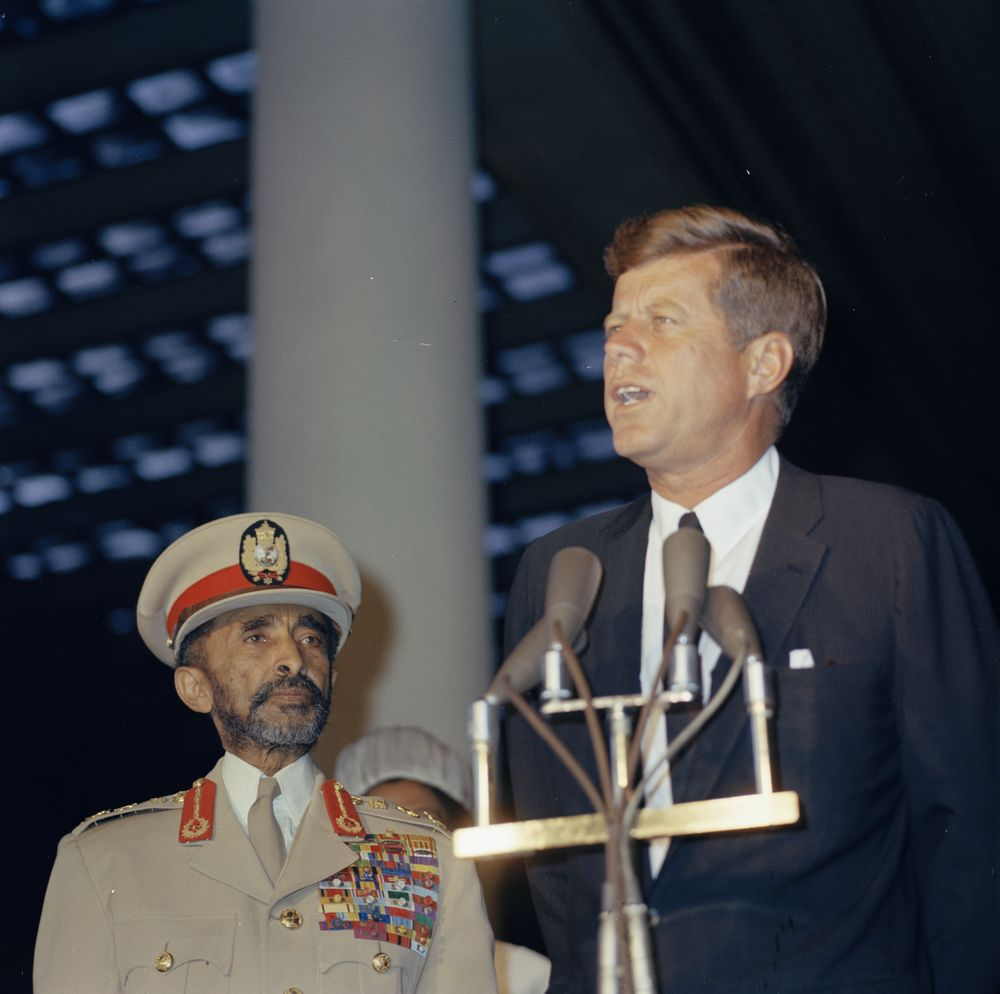
President Kennedy and Emperor Haile Selassie I in 1963

Following the return of Emperor Haile Selassie to Ethiopia, the United States certified Ethiopia for participation in Lend-Lease. This was followed on 16 May 1944 by the arrival of what was later called the Fellows Mission, led by James M. Landis. Another significant event transpired in January 1944, when President Franklin Roosevelt met personally with Emperor Haile Selassie aboard the USS Quincy (CA-71) in the Great Bitter Lake of Egypt. Although no matters of substance were resolved, the meeting both strengthened the Emperor's already strong predilection towards the United States, as well as discomforted the British who had been at odds with the Ethiopian government over the disposition of Eritrea and the Ogaden. These ties were strengthened with the signing of the September 1951 treaty of amity and economic relations. In 1953, a further two agreements were signed: a mutual defense assistance agreement, under which the United States agreed to furnish military equipment and training, and an accord regularizing the operations of a U.S. communication facility at Asmara, Kagnew Station. In 1957, then U.S. Vice President Richard Nixon visited Ethiopia and called it "one of the United States' most stalwart and consistent allies". In addition, during the 1960s the U.S. Army provided mapping for much of the country of Ethiopia in an operation known as the Ethiopia-United States Mapping Mission.

During the 1964 Ethiopian–Somali War over the Ogaden, the Americans tacitly side with Haile Sellasie, with US Air Force delivered military assistance the Ethiopian army, including the deployment of US army combat training teams and the construction of an air base close to the border. The scale of support to Ethiopia was significant enough that the embassy in Mogadishu sent a cable cautioning Washington that if the full extent of American involvement in the conflict was discovered, there would be a serious political fallout with neighboring Somalia.

Through fiscal year 1978, the United States provided Ethiopia with $282 million in military assistance and $366 million in economic assistance in agriculture, education, public health, and transportation.

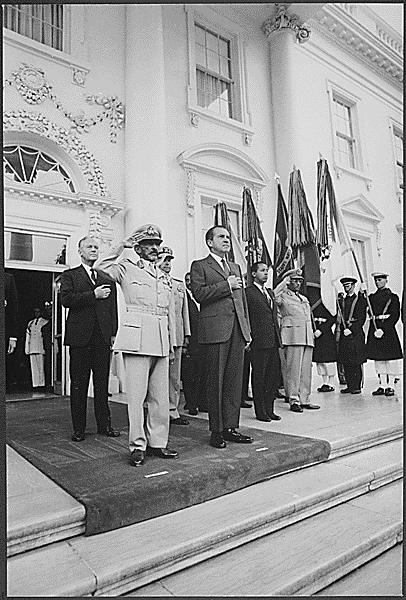
Emperor Haille Selassie I and President Nixon in 1969.

Ethiopia was one of the first countries to take part in the American Peace Corps program, which emphasized agriculture, basic education, tourism, health, economic development and teaching English as a foreign language. The Peace Corps reports that since 1962, when its first volunteers arrived in Ethiopia, a total of 2,934 volunteers have served in that country. U.S. Information Service educational and cultural exchanges were also an important part of their relations.

=== Mengistu Regime ===
After the Ethiopian Revolution, the bilateral relationship began to cool due to the Derg's linking with international communism and U.S. revulsion at the junta's human rights abuses. The United States rebuffed Ethiopia's request for increased military assistance to intensify its fight against the Eritrean secessionist movement and to repel the Somali invasion. The International Security and Development Act of 1985 prohibited all U.S. economic assistance to Ethiopia with the exception of humanitarian disaster and emergency relief. In July 1980, the U.S. ambassador to Ethiopia was recalled at the request of the Ethiopian Government (who was then Frederic L. Chapin), and the U.S. Embassy in Ethiopia and the Ethiopian Embassy in the United States were headed subsequently by Chargé d'affaires.

=== Post-Mengistu regime ===
With the downfall of Mengistu Haile Mariam (who had taken control of the Derg), U.S.-Ethiopian relations improved as legislative restrictions on non-humanitarian assistance to Ethiopia were lifted. Diplomatic relations were upgraded to the ambassadorial level in 1992. Total U.S. government assistance, including food aid, between 1991 and 2003 was $2.3 billion. During the severe drought year of 2003, the U.S. provided a record $553.1 million in assistance, of which $471.7 million was food aid.

== 21st century ==
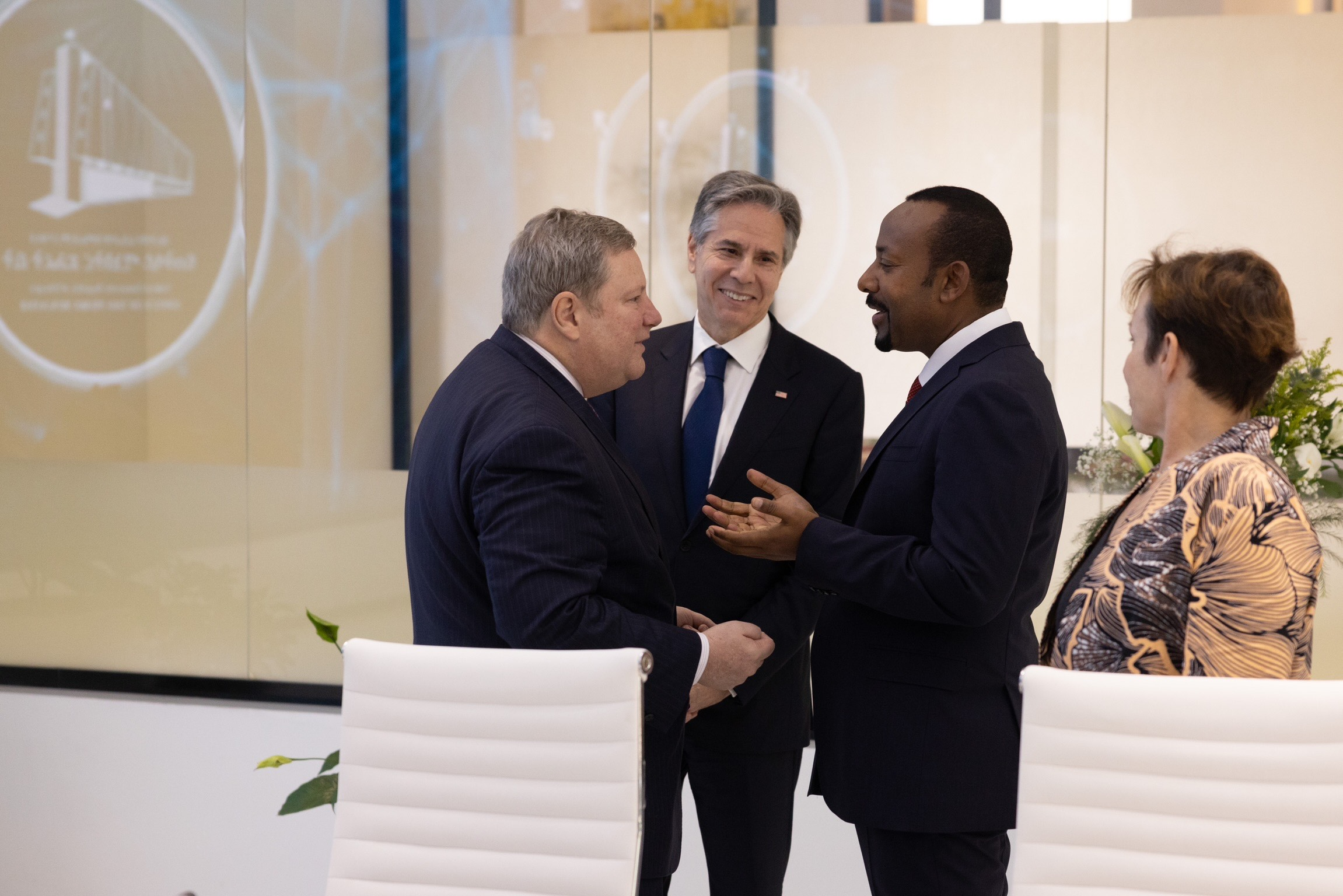
Ethiopian prime minister Abiy Ahmed with U.S. secretary of state Antony Blinken in 2023

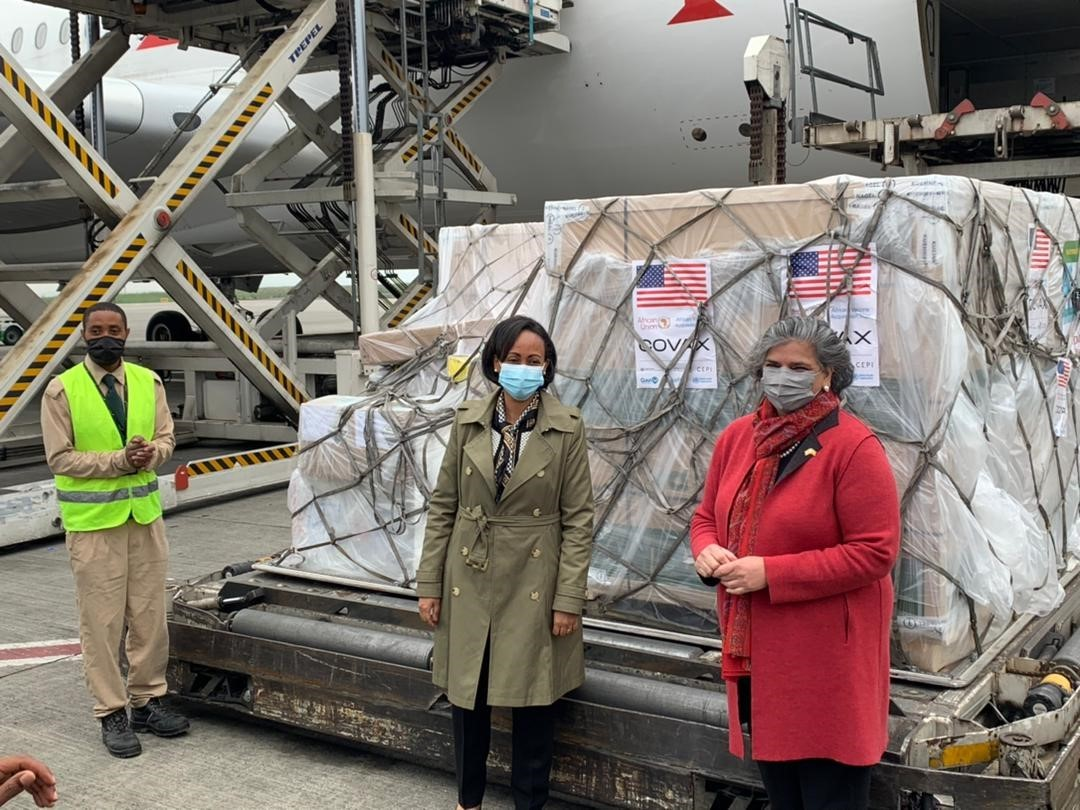
The US delivers Janssen COVID-19 vaccines to Ethiopia as part of the COVAX initiative in 2021

=== U.S. Congress legislation ===
The U.S. Congress, however, attempted to set conditions, over the objections of the George W. Bush administration. In October, 2007, the House of Representatives passed the Ethiopia Democracy and Accountability Act of 2007, banning military aid other than for counterterrorism and peacekeeping unless Ethiopia improved its human rights record. H.R. 2003 was referred to the Senate Committee on Foreign Affairs but was not voted on. The bill sought to restrict U.S. military aid for any purpose other than counter-terrorism and peacekeeping purposes. If the president certified that all political prisoners had been released and an independent media could function without excessive interference, full, normal military aid could resume. The Ethiopia Democracy and Accountability Act would have restricted security assistance and imposed travel restrictions on Ethiopian officials accused of human rights violations unless Ethiopia met the conditions – although the legislation would have given the president a waiver to prevent such measures from taking force.

The Act also exempted counter-terrorism, peacekeeping operations, and international military training from any funding restrictions, a reflection of Ethiopia's military capabilities and its perceived role as a source of stability in the volatile Horn of Africa.

In 2006, the Ethiopian government hired law firm DLA Piper to lobby against the passage of the H.R. 2003. The Ethiopian government was specifically concerned about the sanctions that would be enacted if the bill passed. DLA Piper, on behalf of the Ethiopian government, released statements emphasizing the counterterrorism role that the country played in the region, and that the United States relied on. Additionally, Ethiopian diaspora groups, in opposition to the Ethiopian government, hired Bracewell and Giuliani to lobby for the passage of H.R. 2003.

When asked about H.R. 2003, Secretary of State Condoleezza Rice stated that "The administration does not support this particular house resolution." The Bush administration believed that human rights violations in Ethiopia needed to be addressed, but it claimed that H.R. 2003 was not the best method to do so. Instead, Secretary Rice announced that the administration was working with NGOs to improve the humanitarian situation in Ethiopia and that a good relationship with the Ethiopian government was essential for the efficacy of those programs.

In 2021, the Ethiopian government hired former Representative Joe Garcia to lobby on its behalf.

=== Global war on terror ===
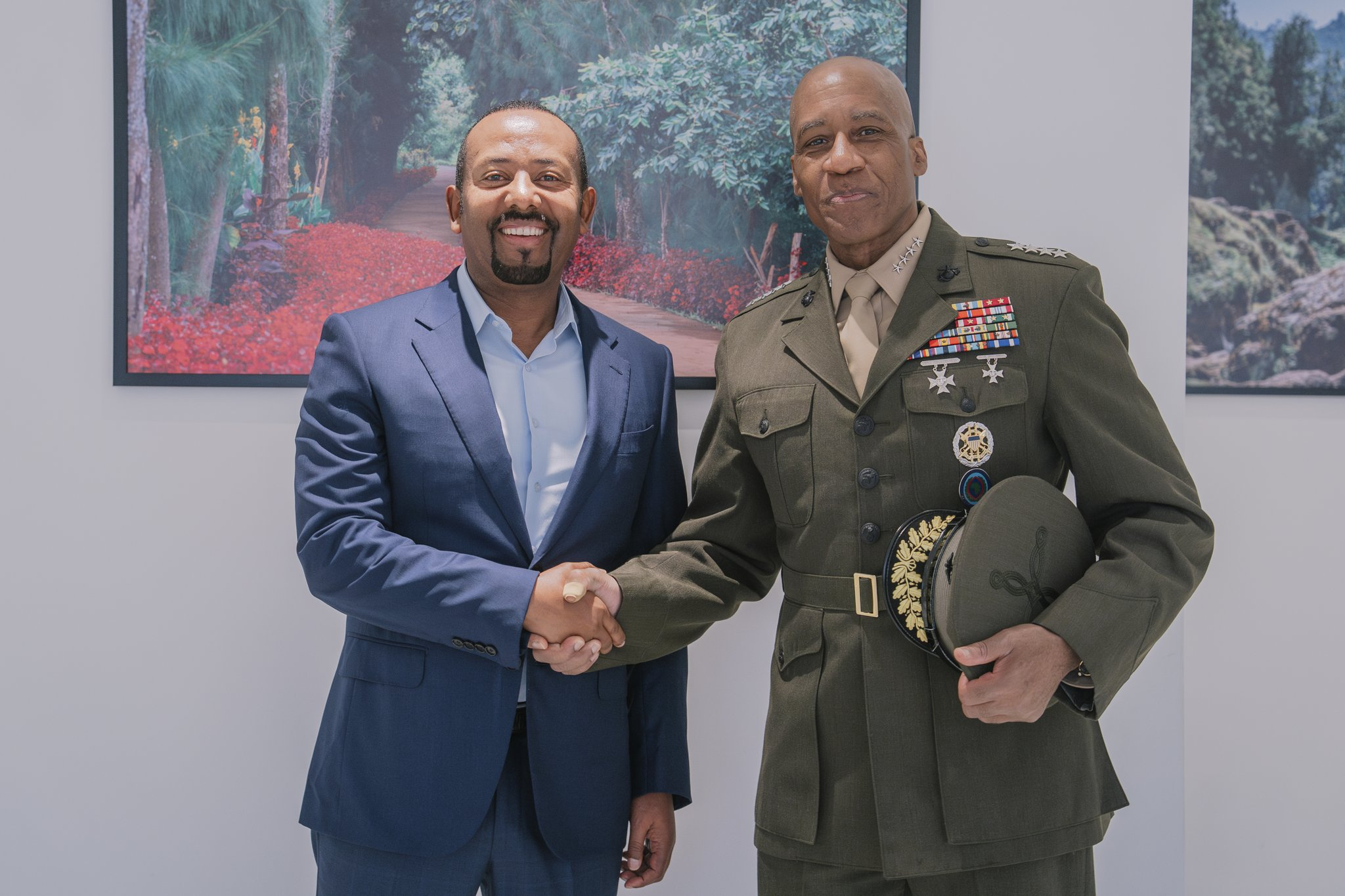
Prime Minister Abiy Ahmed with U.S Africa Command, Marine Corps General Michael Langley

As part of the war on terror, Ethiopia emerged as an 'anchor state' for American policy and Western interests in the Horn of Africa in the early 2000's. Modelled after the National Security Agency, the Ethiopian Information Network Security Agency (INSA) was created with support from the United States government, particularly in the context of the 2006 invasion of Somalia aimed at toppling an Islamic government (the Islamic Courts Union). The original purpose of the agency was to intercept and analyze intelligence primarily from Somalia.

During the full-scale Ethiopian invasion in December 2006, US Special Forces and CIA paramilitary units supported by American AC-130s and helicopter gunships, directly intervened in support of the Ethiopian National Defense Forces (ENDF). The Bush administration doubted Ethiopia's ability to effectively use the new equipment it had provided for the invasion. As a result, it decided to involve US Special Forces and CIA agents in the campaign. According to top officials in the Ethiopian backed Somali transitional government who had helped plan the invasion, "The Ethiopians were not able to come in without the support of the US Government...American air forces were supporting us." In 2010, US ambassador to Ethiopia Donald Yamamoto stated that the Ethiopian invasion had been a mistake and "not a really good idea".

The CIA allegedly used Ethiopia as a base for black sites to secretly interrogate undeclared prisoners in the Global War on Terrorism.

=== Human rights violations ===
Human rights groups have accused the United States of giving Ethiopia's prime minister Meles Zenawi "a free rein" to abuse his own people. In April 2010, Human Rights Watch published a report which accused Zenawi's ruling party Ethiopian Peoples' Revolutionary Democratic Front of having "total control of local and district administrators to monitor and intimidate individuals at the household level." The report author Ben Rawlence also said that "Meles is using aid to build a one-party state" and accused foreign governments of having colluded in eroding civil liberties and democracy by letting their aid be manipulated by Zenawi. The Ethiopian government has denounced the report as "outrageous".

Human rights violations in Ethiopia have created a strain in the two countries relations. Jendayi Frazer, head of U.S. African policy as Assistant Secretary of State for African Affairs at the Bureau of African Affairs, spoke of "unprecedented" agreements between the Ethiopian opposition and government, which she said were "a monumental advancement in the political environment". Examples she gave included reform of the National Election Board of Ethiopia and a new code of conduct for the press. But she added that the U.S. had raised "strong concerns" about human rights violations. In April 2010, Ethiopia attempted to jam broadcasts of the Voice of America, the U.S. state-run broadcaster. Prime Minister Zenawi accused Voice of America of broadcasting ethnic hatred and compared the broadcaster to the hate speech from Radio Mille Collines, which had helped provoke genocide in Rwanda. The Economist pointed out that the U.S. response to these accusations had been rather muted, probably due to the importance of the U.S.-Ethiopia alliance.

During the outbreak of the 2016 Ethiopian protests the U.S. Embassy in Addis Ababa released a statement in which it said the U.S. government was “deeply concerned with the extensive violence.”

In 2022 America announced that it would be issuing sanctions against Ethiopian national whom it accused of having a role in the Tigray Conflict. However, in September 2022, Senator Bob Menendez, the Democratic chairman of the Senate Foreign Relations Committee, criticized the Biden administration for hesitating to impose sanctions on the government of Ethiopia, where many atrocities and war crimes were committed in the civil war between the government and the rebels.

In February 2021, US Secretary of State Antony Blinken condemned ethnic cleansing in the Tigray region of northern Ethiopia and called for the immediate withdrawal of Eritrean forces and other fighters. In March 2023, Blinken met with Ethiopian prime minister Abiy Ahmed in Addis Ababa to normalize relations between the United States and Ethiopia that were strained by the Tigray War between the Ethiopian government and Tigray rebels.

On 30 June 2023, the United States lifted aid restrictions on Ethiopia. According to White House national security spokesperson John Kirby, the restrictions were lifted due to progress on human rights, particularly after the cessation-of-hostilities agreement. While violence continues in the Tigray region, the focus of assistance is on supporting peace, demining efforts, and accountability.

=== African integration ===
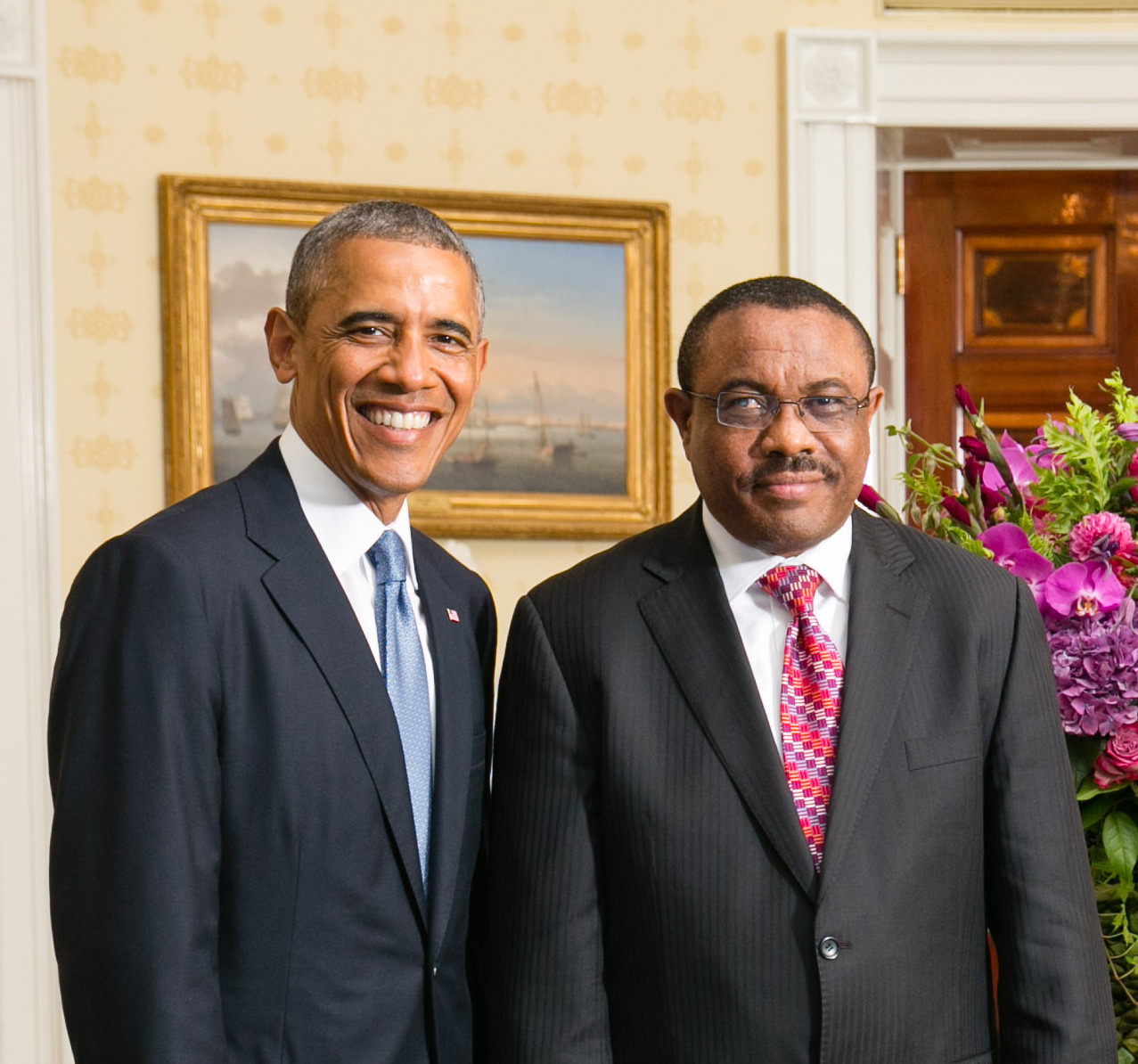
Prime Minister Hailemariam Desalegn and President Obama at the White House in 2014

Barack Obama was the first sitting United States president to speak in front of the African Union in Ethiopia's capital Addis Ababa, on 29 July 2015. With his speech, he encouraged the world to increase economic ties via investments and trade with the continent, and lauded the progresses made in education, infrastructure and the economy. But he also criticized the lack of democracy and leaders who refuse to step off, discrimination against minorities (LGBT people, religious groups and ethnicities) and corruption. He suggested an intensified democratization and free trade, to significantly increase living quality for Africans.

In December 2022, Ethiopian prime minister Abiy Ahmed attended the United States–Africa Leaders Summit 2022 in Washington, D.C., and met with US president Joe Biden.

=== USAID ===
In 2023 Ethiopia received over US$1,000,000,000 in US aid for drought relief, conflict recovery, and long-term development. USAid freeze of February 2025 disrupted aid in Ethiopia, the largest US aid recipient in sub-Saharan Africa. The WFP already cut rations by 40% for 800,000 refugees due to funding gaps. Ahmed Hussein, of the Ethiopian Civil Society Organisations Council, warned that the crisis could worsen, leading to more deaths and instability. The freeze also worsened the ongoing Ethiopian malaria crisis, with 7,300,000 cases reported in 2024.

== See also ==
- Ethiopian Americans
- Foreign relations of the United States
- Foreign relations of Ethiopia
- United States Ambassador to Ethiopia
