= Embassy of the United States, Addis Ababa =

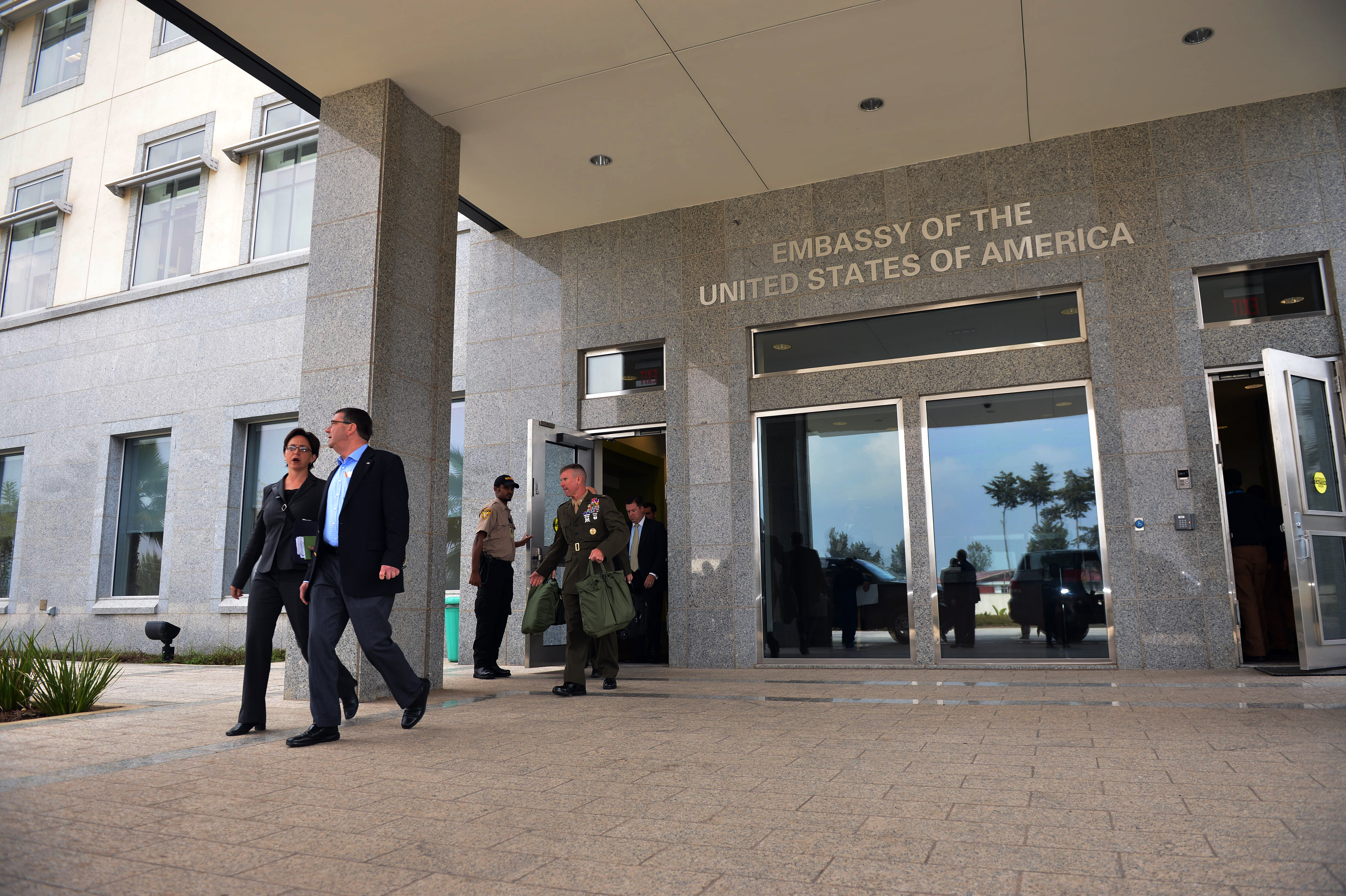
- Location: Addis Ababa, Ethiopia
- Address: US Embassy, Algeria St, Addis Ababa
- Coordinates: 9°3′29″N 38°45′47″E
- Website: https://et.usembassy.gov

The Embassy of the United States in Addis Ababa is the diplomatic mission of the United States of America in Ethiopia.

== History ==
Ethiopia and the United States established diplomatic relations on December 27, 1903, when King Menelik II of Ethiopia and U.S. representative Robert P. Skinner signed a treaty of commerce. The first American Legation in Ethiopia was established on July 6, 1909, with Hoffman Philip presenting his credentials in Addis Ababa.

In early May 1936, an attack on the embassy occurred. Italy invaded Ethiopia and occupied Addis Ababa on May 6, 1936, prompting the withdrawal of U.S. diplomatic representation and the closure of the American Legation. U.S. Minister Resident and Consul General Cornelius Van H. Engert departed on March 4, 1937, and the consulate was closed on March 31, 1937. The American Legation was reopened on August 31, 1943. On June 28, 1949, the legation was elevated to an embassy, with Ambassador George Robert Merrell presenting his credentials. The Ethiopian Legation in the United States was elevated to Embassy status on September 27, 1949.

Throughout the Cold War, the relationship between the two nations was strained as Ethiopia aligned with the Soviet Union. Relations began to improve significantly after the fall of the communist Mengistu regime in 1991.

In 2011, the United States dedicated what became the largest U.S. embassy in sub-Saharan Africa in Addis Ababa. The embassy neighbors the United States Mission to the African Union.

== See also ==
- Embassy of Ethiopia, Washington, D.C.
- Ethiopia–United States relations
- List of ambassadors of the United States to Ethiopia
