= Don C. Bliss =

American diplomat

Don Carroll Bliss Jr. (July 3, 1897 Northville, Michigan-1978 New York) was the American Ambassador to Ethiopia from 1957 until 1960.

== Biography ==
Bliss graduated from Dartmouth College in 1918 and became a career foreign service officer after graduation. He served in the US Navy during World War II. He married Gabriela De Cubas, a daughter of a Spanish diplomat, in 1946. Together they translated Cervantes: The Man and the Genius.
