= Edward H. Kruse =

American politician

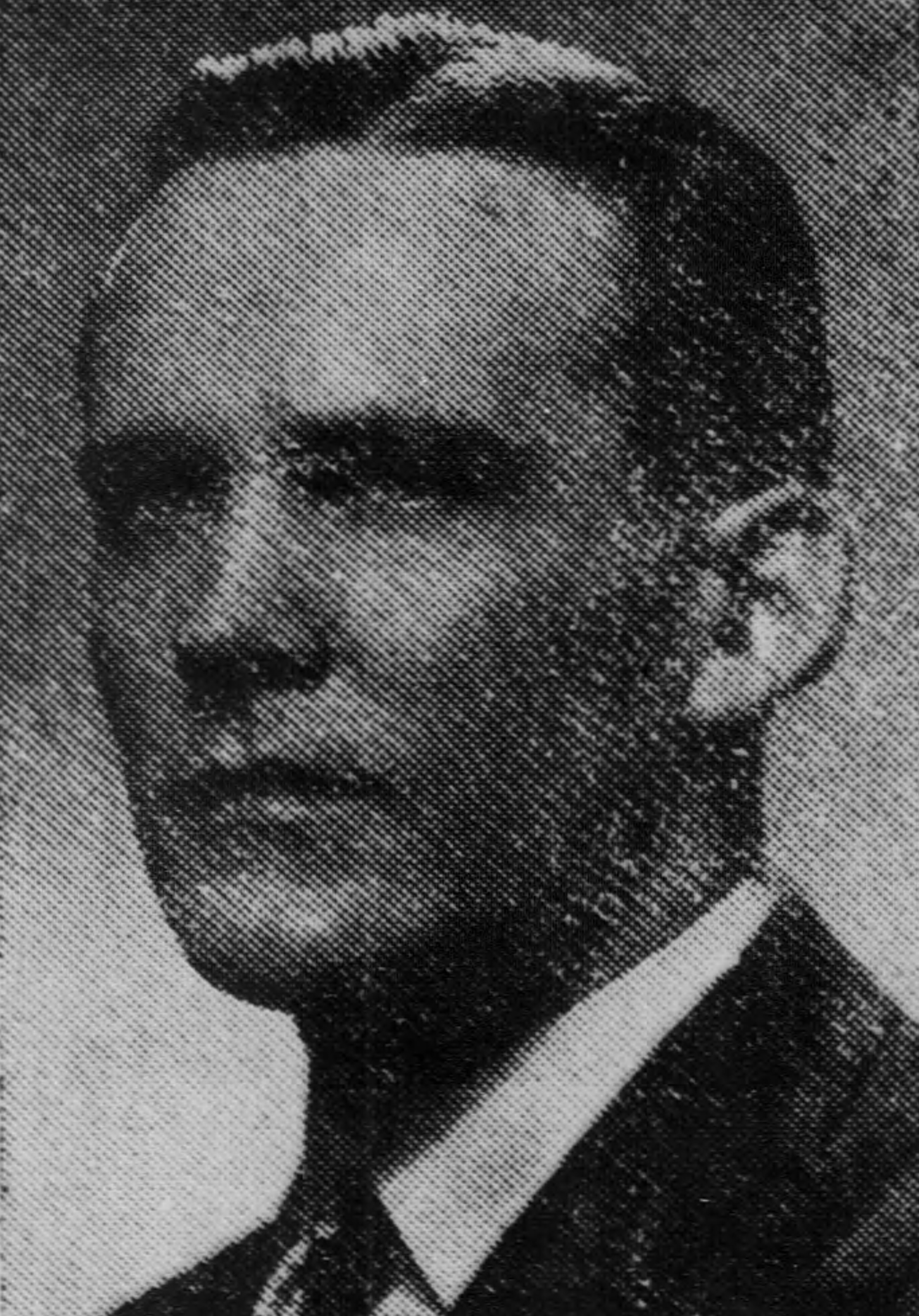

Member of the U.S. House of Representatives from Indiana's 4th district
- In office January 3, 1949 – January 3, 1951
- Preceded by: George W. Gillie
- Succeeded by: E. Ross Adair

Personal details
- Born: Edward Herman Kruse; October 22, 1918 Fort Wayne, Indiana
- Died: January 4, 2000 (aged 81) Fort Lauderdale, Florida
- Party: Democratic
- Education: Butler University; Indiana Law School

Military service
- Branch/service: United States Navy
- Years of service: 1942–1945

Edward Herman Kruse (October 22, 1918 – January 4, 2000) was an American lawyer, World War II veteran, and politician who served one term as a U.S. representative from Indiana from 1949 to 1951.

== Early life and career ==
Born in Fort Wayne, Indiana, Kruse attended South Side High School in his hometown. He graduated in 1942 from Indiana Law School after attending Butler University in Indianapolis, Indiana. He became a lawyer in private practice.

=== World War II ===
Kruse served in the United States Navy from 1942 to 1945, where he attained the rank of lieutenant commander.

== Congress ==
Kruse was elected as a Democrat to the Eighty-first Congress (January 3, 1949 – January 3, 1951). He was an unsuccessful candidate for reelection to the Eighty-second Congress in 1950.

== Later career and death ==
He served as judge of Allen County Superior Court No. 2, Fort Wayne, Indiana in 1952.

He died on January 4, 2000, in Fort Lauderdale, Florida.

U.S. House of Representatives
Preceded by George W. Gillie	Member of the U.S. House of Representatives from Indiana's 4th congressional district 1949-1951	Succeeded by E. Ross Adair
