= Nathaniel Davis =

American diplomat (1925–2011)

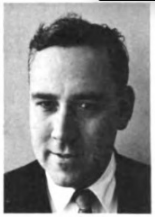

United States Ambassador to Switzerland
- In office November 20, 1976 – July 31, 1977
- President: Gerald Ford; Jimmy Carter
- Preceded by: Peter H. Dominick
- Succeeded by: Marvin L. Warner

6th Assistant Secretary of State for African Affairs
- In office April 2, 1975 – December 18, 1976
- President: Gerald Ford
- Preceded by: Donald B. Easum
- Succeeded by: William E. Schaufele, Jr.

13th Director General of the Foreign Service
- In office November 13, 1973 – March 17, 1975
- President: Richard Nixon; Gerald Ford
- Preceded by: William O. Hall
- Succeeded by: Carol Laise

United States Ambassador to Chile
- In office October 20, 1971 – November 1, 1973
- President: Richard Nixon
- Preceded by: Edward M. Korry
- Succeeded by: David H. Popper

United States Ambassador to Guatemala
- In office November 21, 1968 – August 21, 1971
- President: Lyndon B. Johnson; Richard Nixon
- Preceded by: John Gordon Mein
- Succeeded by: William G. Bowdler

Envoy of the United States to Bulgaria
- In office May 6, 1965 – May 20, 1966
- President: Lyndon B. Johnson
- Preceded by: Eugenie Anderson
- Succeeded by: John M. McSweeney

Personal details
- Born: April 12, 1925 Cambridge, Massachusetts, U.S.
- Died: May 16, 2011 (aged 86) Claremont, California, U.S.
- Parent: Harvey N. Davis (father)
- Education: Stevens Hoboken Academy; Phillips Exeter Academy
- Alma mater: Brown University; Fletcher School of Law and Diplomacy

Nathaniel Davis (April 12, 1925 – May 16, 2011) was a career diplomat who served in the United States Foreign Service for 36 years. His final years were spent teaching at Harvey Mudd College, one of the Claremont Colleges.

== Early years ==
Davis was born in Cambridge, Massachusetts, on April 12, 1925. His father, Harvey Nathaniel Davis, taught at Harvard University and his mother, Alice Rohde Davis, was a research medical doctor. In 1928, the family moved to the campus of Stevens Institute of Technology, in Hoboken, New Jersey, upon the appointment of Harvey Davis as the college's president. Nathaniel Davis attended the Stevens Hoboken Academy and graduated from Phillips Exeter Academy, in Exeter, New Hampshire, in 1942. He attended Brown University, where he served in the Navy Reserve. He graduated from Brown and obtained a commission as an ensign in the U.S. Navy in September 1944, but as a member of the Class of 1946. He served aboard the aircraft carrier USS Lake Champlain until 1946. He earned a master's degree and ultimately a doctorate from the Fletcher School of Law and Diplomacy of Tufts University in 1960.

== Diplomatic career ==
Davis began his Foreign Service career with an assignment in Prague in 1947, followed by postings in Florence, Rome and Moscow, before returning to the U.S. in 1956 to work at the Soviet Desk at the State Department in Washington, D.C. His next foreign assignment was in Caracas, Venezuela, from 1960 to 1962. From 1962 to 1965, he served in the Peace Corps, first as Special Assistant to the Director, R. Sargent Shriver, and later deputy director for Program Development and Operations. He left the Peace Corps in 1965 to serve as the United States Envoy to Bulgaria (1965–1966). After his ambassadorship in Bulgaria, he served on the staff of the National Security Council in the White House, as President Lyndon B. Johnson's senior advisor on Soviet and Eastern European affairs, as well as the United Nations. In 1968, he went to Guatemala to serve as Ambassador to Guatemala (1968–1971), followed by service as Ambassador to Chile (1971–1973). He was ambassador in Chile during the presidency of Salvador Allende and through the coup that deposed him. Davis wrote a history of that period called The Last Two Years of Salvador Allende. Upon his return from Chile, he held two positions at the assistant secretary level: as Director General of the Foreign Service (1973–1975) and as the Assistant Secretary of State for African Affairs in the Ford administration from 1975 to 1976. Davis resigned from the latter post over a policy difference with then-Secretary of State, Henry Kissinger, regarding covert action in Angola.

=== Resignation ===
Operation IA Feature, a covert Central Intelligence Agency operation, authorized U.S. government support for Jonas Savimbi's National Union for the Total Independence of Angola (UNITA) and Holden Roberto's National Liberation Front of Angola (FNLA) militants in Angola. President Gerald Ford approved the program on July 18, 1975, despite strong opposition from officials in the State Department, including Davis, and the CIA. Two days prior to the program's approval Davis told Henry Kissinger, the Secretary of State, that he believed maintaining the secrecy of IA Feature would be impossible. Davis correctly predicted the Soviet Union would respond by increasing its involvement in Angola, leading to more violence and negative publicity for the United States. When Ford approved the program Davis resigned. John Stockwell, the CIA's station chief in Angola, echoed Davis' criticism saying the program needed to be expanded to be successful, but the program was already too large to be kept out of the public eye. Davis' deputy and former U.S. ambassador to Chile, Edward Mulcahy, also opposed direct involvement. Mulcahy presented three options for U.S. policy towards Angola on May 13, 1975. Mulcahy believed the Ford administration could use diplomacy to campaign against foreign aid to the Communist People's Movement for the Liberation of Angola (MPLA), refuse to take sides in factional fighting, or increase support for the FNLA and UNITA. He warned, however, that supporting UNITA would not sit well with Mobutu Sese Seko, the ruler of Zaire.

Davis was subsequently appointed Ambassador to Switzerland (1976–1977). In 1977, Davis moved to Newport, Rhode Island, where he taught at the Naval War College for six years as Diplomat in Residence. In 1983, he retired from the Foreign Service.

== Lawsuit ==
When Costa-Gavras's film Missing was released by Universal Studios in 1982, Davis, who had been the United States Ambassador to Chile from 1971 to 1973, filed a US$150 million libel suit against the director and the studio. Although he was not named directly in the movie, he had been named in the book on which the movie was based. The court eventually dismissed Davis's suit. The film was removed from the market during the lawsuit but re-released upon dismissal of the suit.

== Academia, retirement, and death ==
While still in the Foreign Service, between 1977 and 1983, Davis taught at the U.S. Naval War College in Newport, Rhode Island, where one of his students was Oliver North. Upon his retirement from the Foreign Service, Davis accepted a position as the first Alexander and Adelaide Hixon Professor of Humanities at Harvey Mudd College, in Claremont, California, where he taught political science from 1983 until his retirement in 2002, at which time he was named professor emeritus of Political Science. During his time at Harvey Mudd College, he wrote a book, using research he had been working on since 1947, which had also been the basis for his doctoral dissertation, called A Long Walk to Church: a Contemporary History of Russian Orthodoxy. He wrote a second edition of the book in 2003.

Davis was a skier and had awards and accomplishments in white water canoeing and mountain climbing, most notable of which was a "first ascent" of Mount Abanico in the Venezuelan Andes with George Band. (Band was a member of the team that first successfully climbed Mount Everest.) He also was a political activist, starting in the 1960s with the civil rights movement. Beginning in the 1980s, he held a variety of positions in the Democratic Party, both in California and nationally. On May 16, 2011, Davis died, aged 86, in Claremont, California.

Political offices
Preceded by William O. Hall	Director General of the Foreign Service; November 13, 1973 – March 17, 1975	Succeeded by Carol C. Laise
Diplomatic posts
Preceded by Donald B. Easum	Assistant Secretary of State for African Affairs; April 2, 1975 – December 18, 1975	Succeeded by William E. Schaufele, Jr.
Diplomatic posts
Preceded by Eugenie Anderson	United States Ambassador to Bulgaria; June 4, 1965 – May 20, 1966	Succeeded by John M. McSweeney
Preceded by John Gordon Mein	United States Ambassador to Guatemala; November 21, 1968 – August 21, 1971	Succeeded by William G. Bowdler
Preceded by Edward M. Korry	United States Ambassador to Chile; 20 October 1971 – 1 November 1973	Succeeded by David H. Popper
Preceded by Peter H. Dominick	United States Ambassador to Switzerland; January 9, 1976 – July 31, 1977	Succeeded by Marvin L. Warner
