= Edward M. Korry =

American diplomat

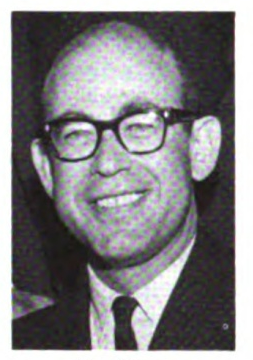
- Born: Edward Malcolm Korry; January 7, 1922; New York City, New York, U.S.
- Died: January 29, 2003 (aged 81); Charlotte, North Carolina, U.S.
- Occupations: Diplomat, Journalist
- Years active: 1945-2003 (his death)

Edward Malcolm Korry (January 7, 1922 – January 29, 2003) was an American diplomat during the administrations of Presidents Kennedy, Johnson, and Nixon.

Korry, a native of New York City, was U.S. Ambassador to Ethiopia (1963–1967) and to Chile (1967–1971). During the Allende administration, the U.S. under Nixon implemented a tougher economic policy toward Chile, decreased economic aid, and prevented access to loans. The US support for the opposition culminated in the September 11th, 1973 coup that overthrew Allende, and resulted in the dictatorship of Augusto Pinochet.

Prior to his appointment to Ethiopia by John F. Kennedy, Korry was European editor for Look magazine and a United Press correspondent and European Editor in post-World War II Europe. In 1954, Korry became the Chief United Press Correspondent for Europe after working as in the same position for Eastern Europe and as United Press Manager for Germany and France. Korry graduated from Washington and Lee University. He joined the Foreign Service in 1939 after serving as a consultant to the Undersecretary of State and as a public member of one of the Foreign Service selection boards in 1962. In 1972 and 1973, he was president of the Association of American Publishers, and later, he was president of the United Nations Association of the United States of America. Korry was also a founding director of the Committee for East-West Relations and a member of the Council on Foreign Relations.

Korry fought to preserve his reputation against widespread press reports, many of them by journalists who had been his peers and friends during his reportorial career, and who colluded or sourced their information from staff members of Senator Church’s Committee to the effect that he had played an instrumental role in a military coup to depose and kill Allende, despite Korry's repeated public claims that he had known nothing of the CIA's plans to foment this, nor had he played any role in it. In 1981, The New York Times, in what Time magazine called a "2,300-word correction," wrote that although the CIA had attempted to orchestrate a military takeover in Chile, "none of this, it is now evident, was known to Ambassador Korry". This "correction" occurred while Korry was teaching a course on International Relations at Connecticut College in New London, CT.

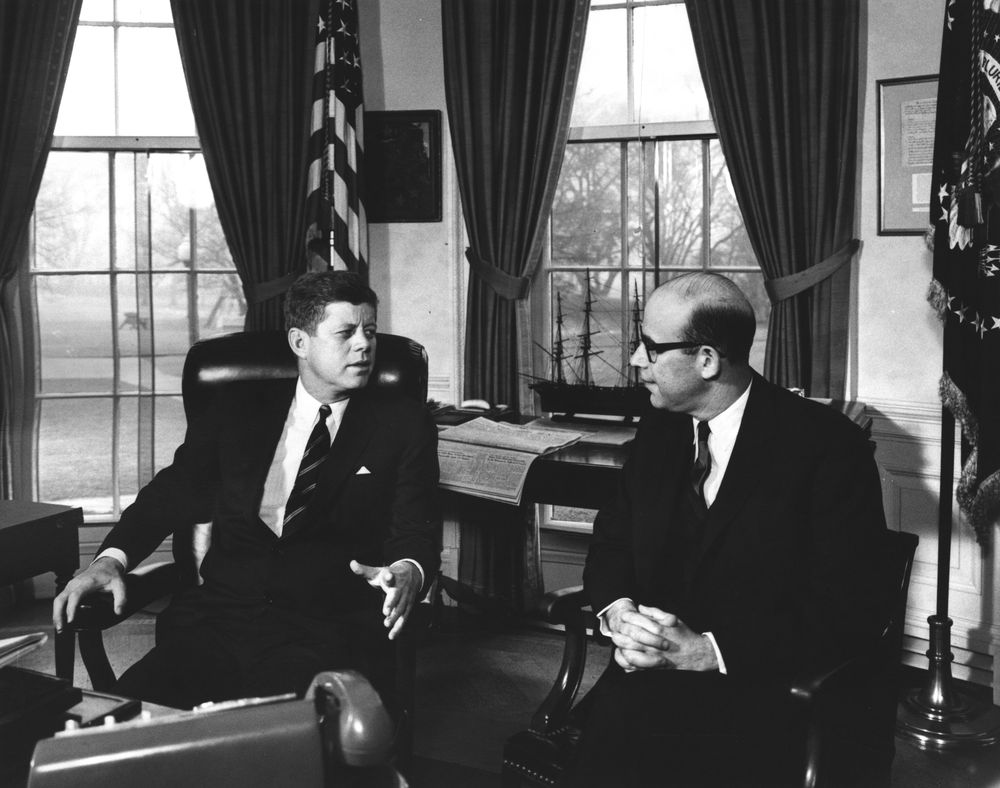
Edward M. Korry (right) with President John F. Kennedy, 1963

Korry died from cancer on January 29, 2003 in Charlotte, North Carolina.

Diplomatic posts
Preceded by Arthur L. Richards	United States Ambassador to Ethiopia; 9 March 1963–22 September 1967	Succeeded by William O. Hall
Preceded by Ralph A. Dungan	United States Ambassador to Chile; 16 October 1967–12 October 1971	Succeeded by Nathaniel Davis
