= James Knight (diplomat) =

American ambassador, diplomat (born 1948)

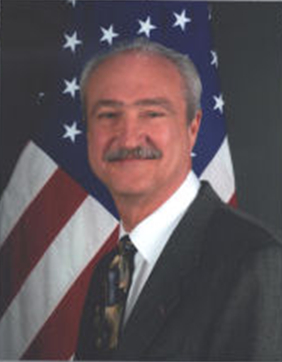

United States Ambassador to Chad
- In office September 6, 2013 – June 2016
- President: Barack Obama
- Preceded by: Mark Boulware
- Succeeded by: Geeta Pasi

United States Ambassador to Benin
- In office November 3, 2009 – April 28, 2012
- President: Barack Obama
- Preceded by: Gayleatha Brown
- Succeeded by: Michael A. Raynor

Personal details
- Born: September 7, 1948
- Died: February 9, 2026 (aged 77)
- Spouse: Amelia Rector Bell
- Education: Wichita State University; University of Chicago

James A. Knight (born 1948) is the former United States Ambassador to Chad, having been confirmed on May 23, 2013. He previously served as ambassador to Benin from 2009 to 2012. In addition to English he speaks French and Portuguese.

== Life ==
Knight is a career member of the Senior Foreign Service. He was formerly the State Department's Director of the Office of East African Affairs after serving as Team Leader of the Ninewa Provincial Reconstruction Team (see the Ninawa campaign), based in Mosul, Iraq. Before Iraq, he was Deputy Chief of Mission (DCM) for the U.S. Mission to Angola as well as the DCM for Embassy Praia in Cape Verde.

Earlier experience includes assignments to the embassies in Ethiopia; Antananarivo, Madagascar; Banjul, the Gambia; and Lagos, Nigeria. Before the Foreign Service Knight worked as an economic development specialist for the U.S. Agency for International Development in Niger and as a software developer for the private sector.

Knight holds a PhD from the University of Chicago, and was awarded the Bronze Star for his service as an infantry officer in the Vietnam War. He is married to the former Amelia Rector Bell, a crisis management specialist at the Foreign Service Institute, and they have four children.

Diplomatic posts
Preceded by Gayleatha Brown	United States Ambassador to Benin; 2009–2012	Succeeded by Michael A. Raynor
Preceded by Mark Boulware	United States Ambassador to Chad; 2013–2016	Succeeded by Geeta Pasi
