= E. Ross Adair =

American politician (1907–1983)

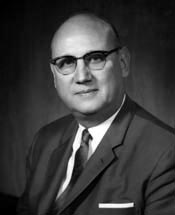

Member of the U.S. House of Representatives from Indiana's 4th district
- In office January 3, 1951 – January 3, 1971
- Preceded by: Edward H. Kruse
- Succeeded by: J. Edward Roush

United States Ambassador to Ethiopia
- In office July 8, 1971 – February 12, 1974
- Preceded by: William O. Hall
- Succeeded by: Arthur W. Hummel Jr.

Personal details
- Born: December 14, 1907 Albion, Indiana, US
- Died: May 5, 1983 (aged 75) Fort Wayne, Indiana, US
- Resting place: Greenlawn Memorial Park and Mausoleum in Fort Wayne, Indiana
- Party: Republican
- Education: Hillsdale College, A.B. George Washington University Law School, J.D.
- Occupation: Attorney

Edwin Ross Adair (December 14, 1907 – May 5, 1983) was an American lawyer and World War II veteran who served 10 terms as a U.S. representative from Indiana from 1951 to 1971. He also served as the United States ambassador to Ethiopia from 1971 to 1974.

== Early life ==
Born in Albion, Indiana, Adair attended grade and high schools in that city. He graduated from Hillsdale College in Michigan, A.B., 1928, and from George Washington University Law School, Washington, D.C., LL.B., 1933.

Adair was admitted to the Indiana bar in 1933 and commenced the practice of law in Fort Wayne, Indiana. He served as probate commissioner of Allen County, Indiana from 1940 to 1950. During World War II, he was called to active duty as a second lieutenant in the Quartermaster Corps Reserve in September 1941 and served until October 1945. He received battle stars for the Normandy, Northern France, Ardennes, Rhine and Central European campaigns.

== U.S. Representative ==
Adair was elected as a Republican from Indiana's 4th congressional district to the Eighty-second and to the nine succeeding Congresses (January 3, 1951 – January 3, 1971). Adair voted in favor of the Civil Rights Acts of 1957, 1960, 1964, and 1968, and the Voting Rights Act of 1965, but voted present on the 24th Amendment to the U.S. Constitution. He was an unsuccessful candidate for reelection in 1970 to the Ninety-second Congress.

=== Ambassador ===
Adair served as the United States Ambassador to Ethiopia from 1971 to 1974 as an appointee of President Richard Nixon.

=== Later career and death ===
Adair resumed the practice of law in Fort Wayne, Indiana, where he resided until his death there, May 5, 1983. He was interred at Greenlawn Memorial Park and Mausoleum in Fort Wayne.

== See also ==
- E. Ross Adair Federal Building and United States Courthouse

U.S. House of Representatives
Preceded by Edward H. Kruse	Member of the U.S. House of Representatives from Indiana's 4th congressional district 1951 – 1971	Succeeded by J. Edward Roush
Preceded by William Hanes Ayres	Ranking Member of the House Veterans' Affairs Committee; 1965–1969	Succeeded by Charles M. Teague
Preceded by Frances P. Bolton	Ranking Member of the House Foreign Affairs Committee; 1969–1971	Succeeded by William S. Mailliard
Diplomatic posts
Preceded by William O. Hall	United States Ambassador to Ethiopia; 1971–1974	Succeeded by Arthur W. Hummel Jr.
