= Geeta Pasi =

American diplomat (born 1962)

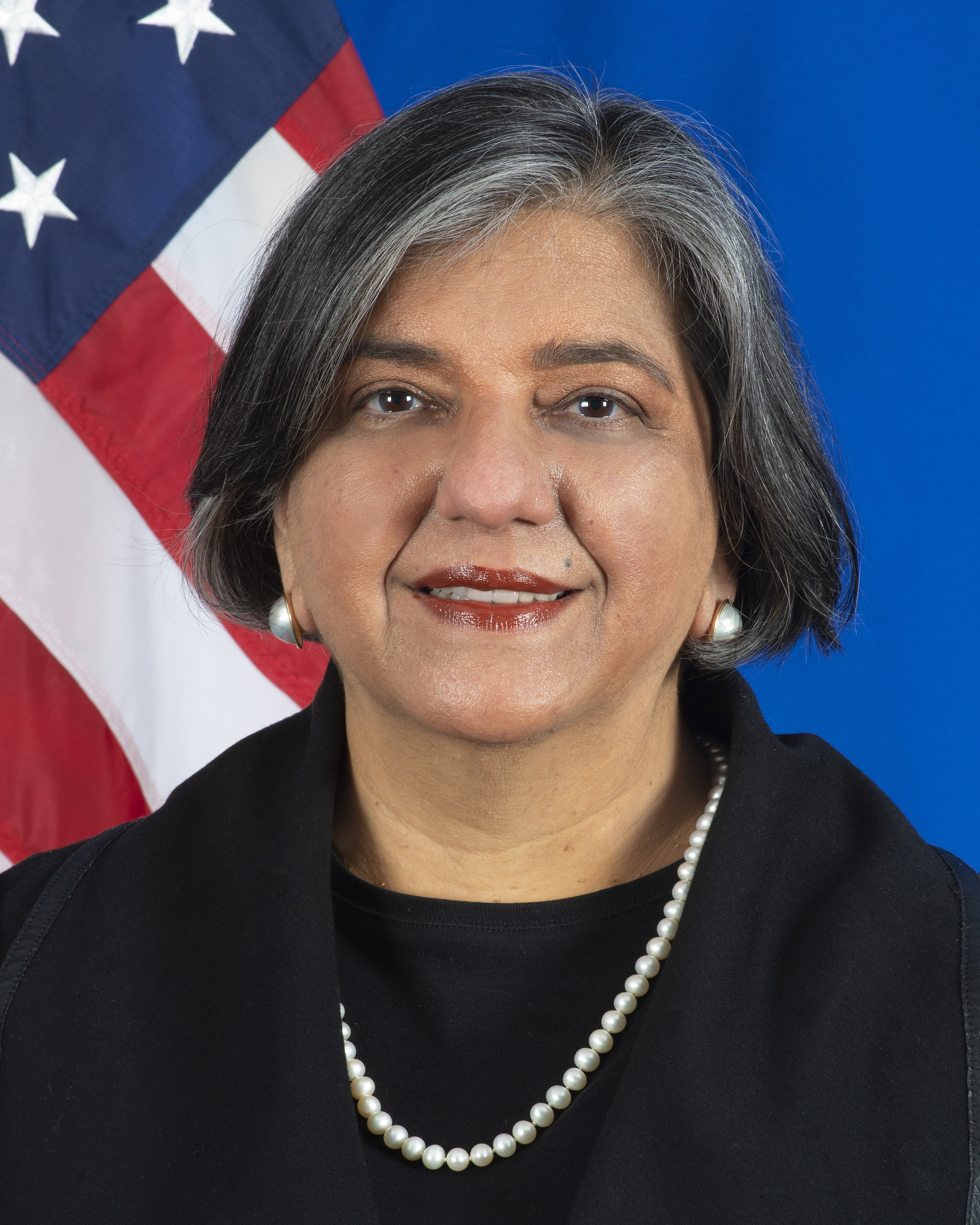

United States Ambassador to Ethiopia
- In office March 5, 2021 – February 25, 2022
- President: Joe Biden
- Preceded by: Michael A. Raynor
- Succeeded by: Ervin Jose Massinga

Deputy Assistant Secretary (African Affairs)
- In office October 22, 2018 – January 2021
- President: Donald Trump
- Preceded by: Stephanie S. Sullivan
- Succeeded by: Robert F. Godec

United States Ambassador to Chad
- In office September 9, 2016 – September 20, 2018
- President: Barack Obama; Donald Trump
- Preceded by: James Knight
- Succeeded by: Alexander M. Laskaris

United States Ambassador to Djibouti
- In office 2011–2014
- President: Barack Obama
- Preceded by: James C. Swan
- Succeeded by: Thomas P. Kelly III

Personal details
- Born: 1962 (age 63–64) New York, U.S.
- Education: Duke University (B.A.); New York University (M.A.)

Geeta Pasi (born 1962) is a retired American diplomat. She was the American ambassador to Djibouti from 2011 to 2014. She was appointed American ambassador to Chad in June 2016 and served until 2018. In September 2018, she left the ambassadorship to become Principal Deputy to the Assistant Secretary of State for African Affairs.

On March 5, 2021, Ambassador Geeta Pasi presented her credentials to President Sahle-Work Zewde of Ethiopia.

As of February 25, 2022, she has retired as ambassador.

== Education ==
Pasi was awarded a Bachelor of Arts degree from Duke University in 1984 and completed a Master of Arts at New York University in 1986.

== State Department career ==
Pasi was appointed ambassador to Djibouti by United States President Barack Obama in 2011.

She had previously held a number of diplomatic positions including deputy Chef de mission at the United States embassy in Bangladesh from 2006 to 2009.

On June 15, 2020, President Donald Trump announced his intent to nominate Pasi to be the next United States Ambassador to Ethiopia. On June 18, 2020, her nomination was sent to the Senate. She appeared before the Senate Foreign Relations Committee on December 2 and was confirmed by voice vote of the full Senate in the early morning hours of December 22, 2020.

== Personal life ==
Pasi speaks French, German, Hindi, Romanian, and Russian.

Diplomatic posts
Preceded by James C. Swan	United States Ambassador to Djibouti; 2011–2014	Succeeded by Thomas P. Kelly III
Preceded by James Knight	United States Ambassador to Chad; 2016–2019	Succeeded by Richard K. Bell
Preceded by Michael A. Raynor	United States Ambassador to Ethiopia; 2021–2022	Succeeded by Ervin Jose Massinga
