= William O. Hall =

United States Ambassador to Ethiopia
- In office September 13, 1967 – May 15, 1971
- Preceded by: Edward M. Korry
- Succeeded by: E. Ross Adair

12th Director General of the Foreign Service
- In office July 5, 1971 – September 30, 1973
- Preceded by: John Howard Burns
- Succeeded by: Nathaniel Davis

Personal details
- Born: William Oscar Hall; May 22, 1914 Roswell, New Mexico, U.S.
- Died: November 8, 1977 (aged 63) Washington County, Oregon, U.S.
- Spouse: Jayne Bowerman Hall
- Children: 3
- Education: University of Oregon; University of Minnesota

William Oscar Hall (May 22, 1914 – November 8, 1977) was the U.S. Ambassador to Ethiopia from 1967 to 1971, during the reign of Emperor Haile Selassie I.

== Biography ==
William O. Hall was born May 22, 1914, in Roswell, New Mexico. He moved with his family to Prineville, Oregon, when he was seven years old. He graduated Phi Beta Kappa from the University of Oregon in 1936, pursued graduate studies at the University of Minnesota, served in the U.S. Navy during World War II, and served in the U.S. Foreign Service thereafter. He worked in the consular service, the United Nations, and the Agency for International Development.

After serving as the U.S. Ambassador to Ethiopia from 1967 to 1971, he retired from the United States Foreign Service. He then taught international affairs at Lewis and Clark College in Portland, Oregon.

He died on November 8, 1977, in Washington County, Oregon. Ambassador Hall was survived by his wife, Jayne Bowerman Hall, three children (Sarah Sternglanz, William Hall, and Robert Hall), and two grandchildren.

== Legacy ==
Ambassador Hall's widow, Jayne Bowerman Hall, has donated numerous pieces of Ethiopian artwork to the University of Oregon Museum of Natural History. Most of the museum's Ethiopian Collection, consisting of nearly 100 objects, was acquired through a gift by Jayne Bowerman Hall as a tribute to her late husband. Jayne Bowerman Hall is the half-sister of University of Oregon track coach and Nike co-founder Bill Bowerman, and the daughter of Jay Bowerman, the 13th governor of Oregon.

Diplomatic posts
Preceded by Edward M. Korry	United States Ambassador to Ethiopia; 1967–1971	Succeeded by E. Ross Adair
