= George W. Gillie =

American politician

George Gillie
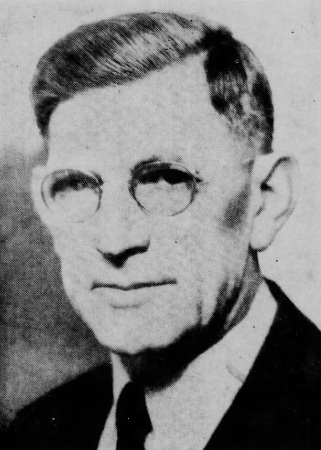
- Gillie in 1938

Member of the U.S. House of Representatives from Indiana's 4th district
- In office January 3, 1939 – January 3, 1949
- Preceded by: James I. Farley
- Succeeded by: Edward H. Kruse

Personal details
- Born: August 15, 1880 Berwickshire, Scotland
- Died: July 3, 1963 (aged 82) Fort Wayne, Indiana, U.S
- Party: Republican
- Education: Ohio State University

George W. Gillie (August 15, 1880 – July 3, 1963) was an American veterinarian and politician who served five terms as a U.S. representative from Indiana from 1939 to 1949.

== Biography ==
Born in Berwickshire, Scotland, Gillie moved to the United States with his parents, who settled in Kankakee, Illinois, in 1882 and in Fort Wayne, Indiana, in 1884. He attended the public schools, International Business College, Fort Wayne, Indiana, in 1898, and Purdue University, Lafayette, Indiana from 1899 to 1901.

He graduated from the Ohio State University at Columbus in 1907 as a doctor of veterinary surgery. He worked as a meat and dairy inspector of Allen County, Indiana from 1908 to 1914. Later, he began the practice of veterinary medicine in Fort Wayne, Indiana, in 1914, and went on to be a sheriff in Allen County 1917–1920, 1929–1930, and 1935–1937.

=== Congress ===
Gillie was elected as a Republican to the Seventy-sixth and to the four succeeding Congresses (January 3, 1939 – January 3, 1949). He was an unsuccessful candidate for reelection in 1948 to the Eighty-first Congress.

=== Later career and death ===
Gillie engaged in agricultural pursuits. He served as jury commissioner for the Federal courts for the northern district of Indiana. He was a resident of Fort Wayne, Indiana, until his death there on July 3, 1963. He was interred in Lindenwood Cemetery.

U.S. House of Representatives
Preceded by James I. Farley	Member of the U.S. House of Representatives from Indiana's 4th congressional district 1939-1949	Succeeded by Edward H. Kruse
