= Michael A. Raynor =

American diplomat (born 1962)

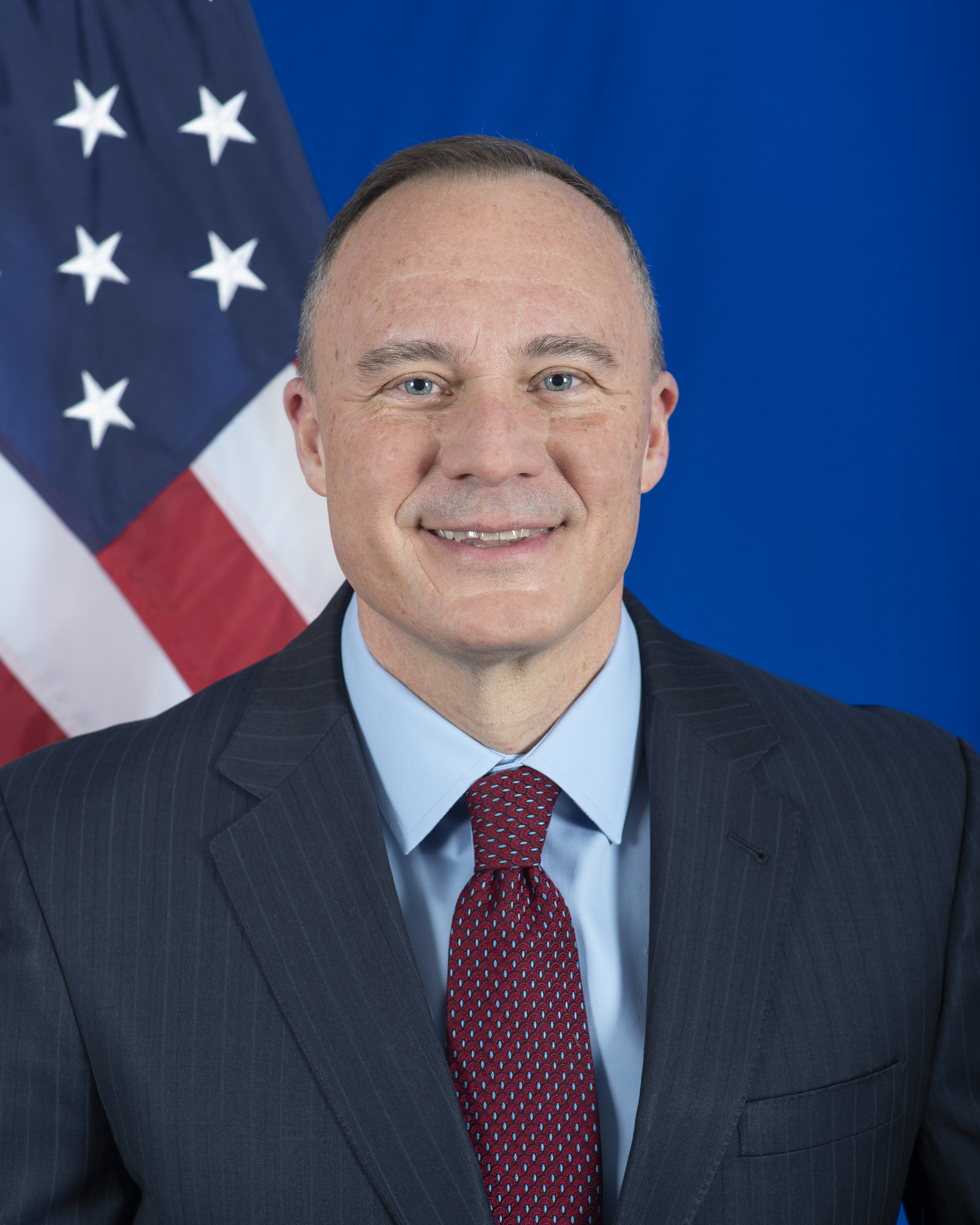

United States Ambassador to Senegal
- In office March 10, 2022 – January 15, 2026
- President: Joe Biden; Donald Trump
- Preceded by: Tulinabo S. Mushingi

United States Ambassador to Guinea-Bissau
- In office April 20, 2022 – January 15, 2026
- President: Joe Biden; Donald Trump
- Preceded by: Tulinabo S. Mushingi

United States Ambassador to Ethiopia
- In office September 29, 2017 – January 20, 2021
- President: Donald Trump
- Preceded by: Patricia M. Haslach
- Succeeded by: Geeta Pasi

United States Ambassador to Benin
- In office September 13, 2012 – May 29, 2015
- President: Barack Obama
- Preceded by: James Knight
- Succeeded by: Lucy Tamlyn

Personal details
- Born: 1962 (age 63–64)
- Spouse: Kathleen
- Children: 2
- Education: Lafayette College; Columbia University

Michael Arthur Raynor (born 1962) is an American Foreign Service Officer specializing in relations with Africa who had served as the United States ambassador to Senegal and the United States ambassador to Guinea-Bissau. He was the United States ambassador to Ethiopia until January 2021. He previously served as the director of the Office of Career Development and Assignments in the Bureau of Human Resources of the United States Department of State. Raynor served as United States Ambassador to Benin from 2012 to 2015 after being nominated by President Barack Obama and confirmed by the U.S. Senate. Prior to his post in Benin, he was deputy executive director and then executive director of the Bureau of African Affairs.

== Early life and education ==
Raynor earned his bachelor's degree in 1984 from Lafayette College, going on to obtain a master's degree in international affairs from Columbia University.

== Career ==
Raynor is a career member of the Senior Foreign Service, having joined the United States Foreign Service in 1988. He has served eight U.S. missions overseas, including six in Africa. He has been assigned to the U.S. embassy in Brazzaville, the consular officer at the embassy in Luxembourg, and the U.S. embassies in Djibouti City, Conakry, and Windhoek. He was a desk officer for Zimbabwe before becoming legislative management officer and special assistant in the Bureau of Legislative Affairs. Raynor was the management counselor at the U.S. Embassy in Harare from 2004 to 2008.

After returning from his post in Harare, Raynor was named deputy executive director of the Bureau of African Affairs in 2008. In 2010, he was elevated to executive director.

=== Ambassador to Benin ===
On December 15, 2011, Raynor was nominated by President Barack Obama to become United States Ambassador to Benin. Hearings on his nomination were held before the Senate Foreign Relations Committee on March 22, 2012. The committee favorably reported the nomination on April 26, 2012. He was confirmed by the United States Senate on May 24, 2012, and assumed the ambassadorship on September 13, 2012. Raynor left his post in Benin on May 29, 2015, and became director of the Office of Career Development and Assignments in the Bureau of Human Resources at the United States Department of State. Raynor left the position in May 2015.

=== Ambassador to Ethiopia ===
In May 2017, President Donald Trump nominated Raynor to become United States ambassador to Ethiopia. Hearings on his nomination were held before the Senate Foreign Relations Committee on July 26, 2017. The committee favorably reported his nomination on August 3, 2017. He was confirmed to the position by the United States Senate on August 3, 2017. Raynor left the position in January 2021.

=== Ambassador to Senegal and Guinea-Bissau ===
On April 15, 2021, President Joe Biden nominated Raynor to be the next United States ambassador to Senegal and serve concurrently as the United States ambassador to Guinea-Bissau. On August 5, 2021, a hearing on his nomination was held before the Senate Foreign Relations Committee. On October 19, 2021, his nomination was reported favorably out of committee. On December 18, 2021, the United States Senate confirmed his nomination by voice vote. He presented his credentials to Senegal President Macky Sall on March 10, 2022. He presented his credentials to Guinea-Bissau President Umaro Sissoco Embaló on April 20, 2022.

== Awards and recognitions ==
Raynor is the recipient of the State Department’s Leamon R. Hunt Award for Management Excellence.

== Personal life ==
Raynor speaks French.

== See also ==
- Ambassadors of the United States

Diplomatic posts
Preceded by James Knight	United States Ambassador to Benin; 2012–2015	Succeeded by Lucy Tamlyn
Preceded by Patricia M. Haslach	United States Ambassador to Ethiopia; 2017–2021	Succeeded by David Renz as Chargé d'Affairs
Preceded by Patricia M. Haslach	United States Ambassador to Ethiopia; 2017–2021	Succeeded by Geeta Pasi as Ambassador Extraordinary and Plenipotentiary
Preceded by Tulinabo S. Mushingi	United States Ambassador to Senegal; 2022–2026	Vacant
Preceded by Tulinabo S. Mushingi	United States Ambassador to Guinea-Bissau; 2022–2026	Vacant
