= Ervin Jose Massinga =

American diplomat

Ervin Massinga
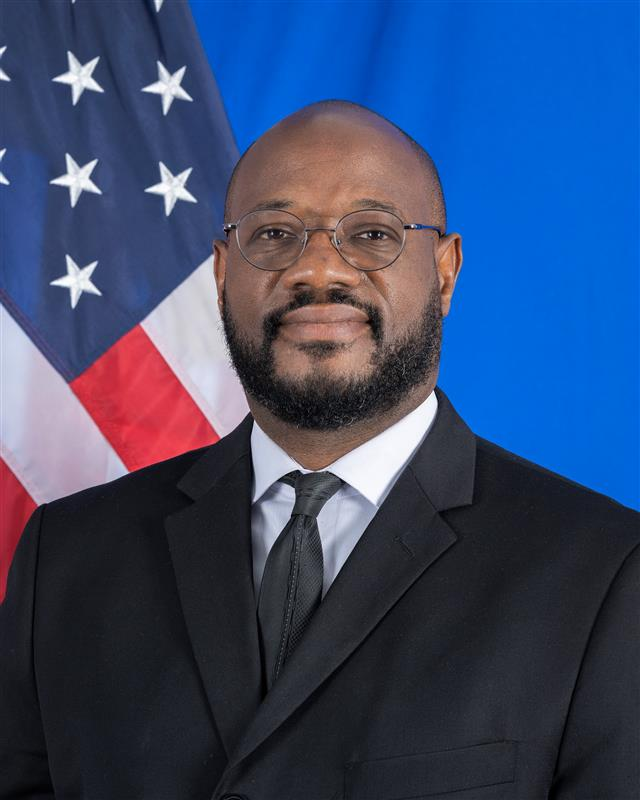

United States Ambassador to Ethiopia
- Incumbent
- Assumed office October 3, 2023
- President: Joe Biden; Donald Trump
- Preceded by: Geeta Pasi

Personal details
- Born: Ervin Jose Massinga
- Education: Georgetown University (BS); University of Washington (MPP)

Ervin Jose Massinga is an American diplomat who has served as the United States ambassador to Ethiopia since 2023.

== Education ==
Massinga earned a Bachelor of Science degree from the Walsh School of Foreign Service at Georgetown University and a Master of Public Policy from the Evans School of Public Policy and Governance at the University of Washington.

== Career ==
A career member of the United States Foreign Service, Massinga has served in embassies in Pakistan, Sudan, Guinea, the Dominican Republic, Chile, Ivory Coast, and China. He was also assigned to the Bureau of African Affairs, Bureau of Economic and Business Affairs, Office of the United States Trade Representative, and Bureau of Intelligence and Research.

=== Ambassador to Ethiopia ===
On January 3, 2023, President Joe Biden nominated Massinga to be the ambassador to Ethiopia. Hearings on his nomination were held before the Senate Foreign Relations Committee on May 16, 2023. His nomination was favorably reported by the committee on June 1, 2023. Massinga was confirmed by the United States Senate via voice vote on July 27, 2023. Massinga presented his credentials to President Sahle-Work Zewde on October 3, 2023.

== Personal life ==
Massinga speaks English, French, Spanish, and Mandarin Chinese.
