= List of ambassadors of the United States to Ethiopia =

Ambassador of the United States to Ethiopia
- Seal of the United States Department of State

- Flag of a United States ambassador

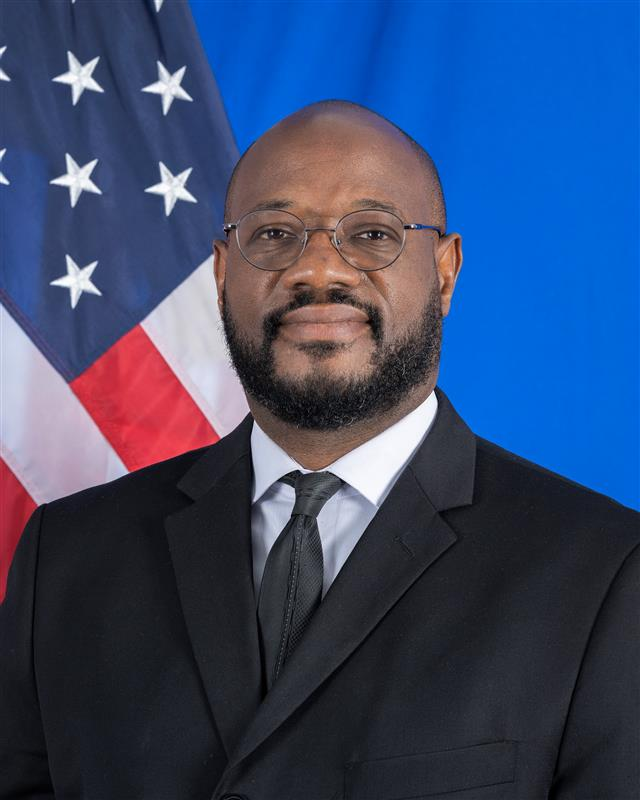
- Incumbent; Ervin Jose Massinga since October 3, 2023
- Nominator: The president of the United States
- Appointer: The president; with Senate advice and consent
- Inaugural holder: Hoffman Philip as Minister Resident/Consul General
- Formation: July 20, 1908
- Website: U.S. Embassy - Addis Ababa

The United States established diplomatic relations with Ethiopia in 1903 and commissioned its first ambassador to Ethiopia, Hoffman Philip, in 1908. Relations continued uninterrupted until 1980. In July 1980, the U.S. Ambassador to Ethiopia was recalled at the request of the Ethiopian Government, and the U.S. Embassy in Ethiopia and the Ethiopian Embassy in the United States were headed by chargés d’affaires. After the defeat of the Derg regime in 1991 and installation of a new government, the current chargé was commissioned as the new ambassador. The U.S. has had good relations with the Ethiopian government since that time.

== Ambassadors ==
Name	Title	Appointed	Presented credentials	Terminated mission	Notes
Hoffman Philip	Minister Resident/Consul General	July 20, 1908	July 6, 1909	February 8, 1910	
Addison E. Southard – Career FSO	Minister Resident/Consul General	October 12, 1927	March 1, 1928	October 26, 1934	
Cornelius Van H. Engert – Career FSO	Minister Resident/Consul General	February 7, 1936	April 30, 1936	May 4, 1937	The U. S. Legation in Addis Ababa was closed and diplomatic personnel were withdrawn following the Italian occupation of Ethiopia in 1937. The U. S. never recognized Italian authority in Ethiopia. The legation was reopened and a new Minister Resident/Consul was appointed in 1943.
John K. Caldwell – Career FSO	Minister Resident/Consul General	April 14, 1943	August 31, 1943	December 9, 1943	
John K. Caldwell – Career FSO	Envoy Extraordinary and Minister Plenipotentiary	October 7, 1943	December 9, 1943	August 26, 1945	
Felix Cole – Career FSO	Envoy Extraordinary and Minister Plenipotentiary	February 20, 1945	October 5, 1945	October 8, 1947	
George R. Merrell – Career FSO	Envoy Extraordinary and Minister Plenipotentiary	May 15, 1947	January 1, 1948	May 21, 1949	
George R. Merrell – Career FSO	Ambassador Extraordinary and Plenipotentiary	May 21, 1949	June 28, 1949	March 17, 1951	
J. Rives Childs – Career FSO	Ambassador Extraordinary and Plenipotentiary	April 19, 1951	May 14, 1951	January 19, 1953	
Joseph Simonson – Political appointee	Ambassador Extraordinary and Plenipotentiary	July 22, 1953	October 6, 1953	May 1, 1957	
Don C. Bliss – Career FSO	Ambassador Extraordinary and Plenipotentiary	May 20, 1957	June 22, 1957	June 4, 1960	
Arthur L. Richards – Career FSO	Ambassador Extraordinary and Plenipotentiary	June 24, 1960	August 26, 1960	Left Ethiopia, November 25, 1962	
Edward M. Korry – Political appointee	Ambassador Extraordinary and Plenipotentiary	March 9, 1963	April 20, 1963	September 22, 1967	
William O. Hall – Career FSO	Ambassador Extraordinary and Plenipotentiary	September 13, 1967	October 27, 1967	May 15, 1971	
E. Ross Adair – Political appointee	Ambassador Extraordinary and Plenipotentiary	May 11, 1971	July 8, 1971	February 12, 1974	
Arthur W. Hummel, Jr. – Career FSO	Ambassador Extraordinary and Plenipotentiary	February 20, 1975	April 3, 1975	July 6, 1976	
Frederic L. Chapin – Career FSO	Ambassador Extraordinary and Plenipotentiary	June 27, 1978	July 21, 1978	July 29, 1980	The U.S. ambassador was recalled in July 1980 and a series of chargés maintained the embassy until June 1992.
Owen W. Roberts	Chargé d'Affaires	July 29, 1980	Unknown	May 1982	
David A. Korn	Chargé d'Affaires	June 1982	Unknown	July 1985	
James Cheek	Chargé d'Affaires	July 1985	Unknown	August 1988	
Robert G. Houdek	Chargé d'Affaires	August 1988	Unknown	June 1991	
Marc Allen Baas – Career FSO	Chargé d'Affaires	June 1991	Unknown	June 24, 1992	
Marc Allen Baas – Career FSO	Ambassador Extraordinary and Plenipotentiary	June 15, 1992	June 24, 1992	July 8, 1994	
Irvin Hicks – Career FSO	Ambassador Extraordinary and Plenipotentiary	May 9, 1994	July 22, 1994	June 26, 1996	
David H. Shinn – Career FSO	Ambassador Extraordinary and Plenipotentiary	June 6, 1996	July 2, 1996	August 14, 1999	
Tibor P. Nagy – Career FSO	Ambassador Extraordinary and Plenipotentiary	August 9, 1999	October 12, 1999	July 19, 2002	
Aurelia E. Brazeal – Career FSO	Ambassador Extraordinary and Plenipotentiary	October 3, 2002	November 20, 2002	September 2, 2005	
Vicki J. Huddleston	Chargé d'Affaires	September 2, 2005	Unknown	November 9, 2006	
Donald Yamamoto – Career FSO	Ambassador Extraordinary and Plenipotentiary	November 9, 2006	December 6, 2006	July 28, 2009	
Donald E. Booth – Career FSO	Ambassador Extraordinary and Plenipotentiary	April 2, 2010	May 2, 2010	August 16, 2013	
Patricia M. Haslach – Career FSO	Ambassador Extraordinary and Plenipotentiary	August 14, 2013	September 25, 2013	August 31, 2016	
Peter H. Vrooman	Chargé d'Affaires	September 1, 2016	Unknown	July 2017	
Michael A. Raynor – Career FSO	Ambassador Extraordinary and Plenipotentiary	August 3, 2017	September 29, 2017	January 20, 2021	
David Renz – Career FSO	Chargé d'Affaires	January 20, 2021	Unknown	March 5, 2021	
Geeta Pasi – Career FSO	Ambassador Extraordinary and Plenipotentiary	December 22, 2020	March 5, 2021	February 25, 2022	
Tracey Ann Jacobson – Career FSO	Chargé d'Affaires	February 25, 2022		September 25, 2023	
Gwendolyn Green – Career FSO	Chargé d'Affaires	September 26, 2023		October 3, 2023	
Ervin Jose Massinga – Career FSO	Ambassador Extraordinary and Plenipotentiary	July 23, 2023	October 3, 2023	Incumbent	

== See also ==
- Ethiopia–United States relations
- Foreign relations of Ethiopia
- Ambassadors of the United States
