= Trueheart =

Trueheart is a surname. Notable people with the surname include:

- Charles Trueheart (born 1951), American writer, newspaper correspondent, and non-profit executive
- William C. Trueheart (1918–1992), American diplomat
- William E. Trueheart (born 1942), American academic administrator and nonprofit chief executive
