= List of ambassadors of the United States to Libya =

Ambassador of the United States to Libya
- سفارة الولايات المتحدة الأميركية في ليبيا
- Seal of the United States Department of State

- Flag of a United States ambassador

- Incumbent; Inga Heemink since August 2026
- Residence: Tripoli
- Nominator: The president of the United States
- Appointer: The president; with Senate advice and consent
- Inaugural holder: Henry Serrano Villard as Envoy Extraordinary and Minister Plenipotentiary
- Formation: February 7, 1952
- Website: U.S. Embassy – Tripoli

The United States ambassador to Libya is the official representative of the president of the United States to the head of state of Libya.

== History ==
Until its independence in 1951, Libya had been a colony of Italy (1912–1947) and then under British and French occupation until 1951. In 1949 The UN General Assembly had passed a resolution stating that Libya should become independent before January 1, 1952 (Resolution 289). On December 24, 1951, Libya declared its independence under King Idris.

The United States recognized the Kingdom of Libya on December 24, 1951, in a congratulatory message sent by President Harry Truman to King Idris I. Diplomatic relations were established on the same day and the U.S. Consulate-General was elevated to a legation with Andrew Lynch designated as Charge d'Affaires ad interim. The first official envoy to Libya was Henry Serrano Villard, who presented his credentials on March 6, 1952.

On December 2, 1979, a mob attacked and burned the U.S. Embassy in Tripoli. On December 29, the U.S. Department of State designated Libya as a state sponsor of terrorism. The Chargé d’Affaires was recalled on February 8, 1980 and the embassy was closed May 2, 1980. However, diplomatic relations were not formally severed. Diplomatic relations were not resumed until 2006.

The U.S. Embassy in Tripoli was closed and all diplomatic personnel were evacuated on February 25, 2011, due to the Libyan civil war. The embassy of Hungary in Tripoli acted as the protecting power for U.S. interests from the closure of the embassy until its reopening on September 22, 2011.

On July 15, U.S. Secretary of State Clinton announced that the U.S. Government recognizes the Libyan rebel National Transitional Council as the "legitimate governing authority" of Libya—which de facto withdraws recognition from the Gaddafi government. On September 12, 2012 the US ambassador to Libya was killed in an attack on the Benghazi consulate, along with three other embassy employees.

The U.S Embassy was again evacuated and closed on July 26, 2014. Embassy staff totaling approximately 150 personnel, including about 80 U.S Marines, were evacuated overland to Tunisia during a military assisted departure. USAF F-16's provided armed overwatch for the embassy convoy as they drove through Libya. The evacuation was due to major fighting around the embassy related to the 2014 Libyan Civil War.

However, the United States did not sever diplomatic relations with Libya. Working from the U.S. Embassies in Valletta, Malta and, after August 2015, Tunis, Tunisia under the authority of the U.S. Ambassador to Libya, U.S. diplomats in the Libya External Affairs Office maintained regular dialogue with the provisional Libyan Government.

== Ambassadors and chiefs of mission ==
Name	Title	Appointed	Presented credentials	Terminated mission	Notes
Andrew Green Lynch – Career FSO	Chargé d'Affaires a.i.	December 24, 1951	—	Superseded by Ambassador Villard, March 6, 1952	
Henry Serrano Villard – Career FSO	Envoy Extraordinary and Minister Plenipotentiary	February 7, 1952	March 6, 1952	June 24, 1954	John Newton Gatch was serving as Chargé d’Affaires a.i. when the U.S. legation in Libya was raised to Embassy status on September 25, 1954.
John L. Tappin – Political appointee	Ambassador Extraordinary and Plenipotentiary	September 25, 1954	November 16, 1954	Superseded by Ambassador Jones March 17, 1958	
John Wesley Jones – Career FSO	Ambassador Extraordinary and Plenipotentiary	February 5, 1958	March 17, 1958	Left Libya December 20, 1962	
Edwin Allan Lightner – Career FSO	Ambassador Extraordinary and Plenipotentiary	May 3, 1963	May 27, 1963	June 30, 1965	
David D. Newsom – Career FSO	Ambassador Extraordinary and Plenipotentiary	July 22, 1965	October 16, 1965	June 21, 1969	
Joseph Palmer II – Career FSO	Ambassador Extraordinary and Plenipotentiary	July 8, 1969	October 9, 1969	November 7, 1972	
Harold G. Josif	Chargé d'Affaires ad interim	November 1972		December 1973	
Robert A. Stein	Chargé d'Affaires ad interim	December 1973		December 1974	
Robert Carle	Chargé d'Affaires ad interim	January 1975		August 1978	
William L. Eagleton	Chargé d'Affaires ad interim	August 1978		February 8, 1980	Recalled February 8, 1980 following breakdown of diplomatic relations.
The U.S. Embassy at Tripoli closed May 2, 1980. However, diplomatic relations were not formally severed. The United States established an Interests Section at the Belgian Embassy in Tripoli, February 8, 2004. It became the U.S. Liaison Office on June 28, with Gregory L. Berry as the Principal Officer. On May 31, 2006, the U.S. resumed full diplomatic relations with Libya, and the Interests Section in Tripoli became an embassy, with Gregory L. Berry as Charge d'Affaires ad interim.
Gregory L. Berry – Career FSO	Chargé d'Affaires ad interim	May 31, 2006	–	October 10, 2006	
Charles O. Cecil – Career FSO	Chargé d'Affaires ad interim	November 15, 2006	—	July 11, 2007	
Gene A. Cretz – Career FSO	Ambassador Extraordinary and Plenipotentiary	December 17, 2008	January 11, 2009	May 15, 2012	
J. Christopher Stevens – Career FSO	Ambassador Extraordinary and Plenipotentiary	May 22, 2012	June 7, 2012	September 12, 2012. Stevens was killed in a terrorist attack on the U.S consulate in Benghazi.	
Laurence Pope – Career FSO	Chargé d'Affaires ad interim	October 11, 2012	—	January 4, 2013	
William Roebuck – Career FSO	Chargé d'Affaires ad interim	January 4, 2013	—	May 2013	
Deborah K. Jones – Career FSO	Ambassador Extraordinary and Plenipotentiary	May 2013	June 20, 2013	September 12, 2015	
Peter W. Bodde – Career FSO	Ambassador Extraordinary and Plenipotentiary	November 19, 2015	January 21, 2016	June 20, 2018	
Richard B. Norland – Career FSO	Ambassador Extraordinary and Plenipotentiary	August 1, 2019	August 8, 2019	September 8, 2022	
Leslie Ordeman - Career FSO	Chargé d'Affaires ad interim	September 8, 2022		August 23, 2023	
Richard B. Norland – Career FSO	Special Envoy and Chargé d'Affaires ad interim	August 24, 2023		October 9, 2023	
Jeremy Berndt - Career FSO	Chargé d'Affaires ad interim	October 9, 2023		August 2026	
Inga Heemink - Career FSO	Chargé d'Affaires ad interim	August 2026		Present	

== See also ==
- Libya–United States relations
- Foreign relations of Libya
- Ambassadors of the United States
