= John Campbell (diplomat) =

American diplomat

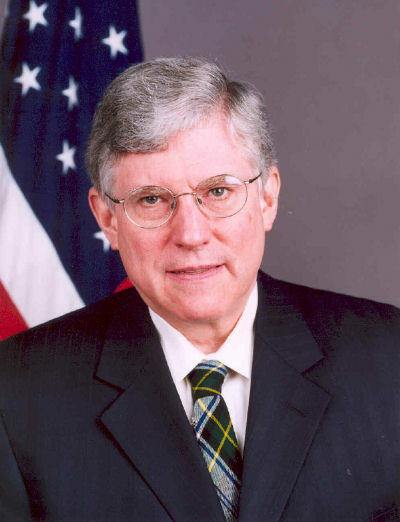

United States Ambassador to Nigeria
- In office May 20, 2004 – November 1, 2007
- President: George W. Bush
- Preceded by: Howard Franklin Jeter
- Succeeded by: Robin Renee Sanders

The Historian of the U.S. Department of State
- In office July 2009 – September 2009
- President: Barack Obama
- Preceded by: Marc Susser
- Succeeded by: Edward P. Brynn

Personal details
- Born: 1944 (age 81–82)
- Education: University of Virginia; University of Wisconsin

John Campbell (born 1944) is a former acting director of the Office of the Historian within the United States Department of State. He was appointed to the position in June 2009 and was succeeded as acting director by Edward P. Brynn the same year.

== Early life ==
Born in Washington, D.C., Campbell earned his Bachelor of Arts and Master of Arts from the University of Virginia and Ph.D. from the University of Wisconsin in 1970.

== Consular career ==
Campbell joined the Foreign Service in 1975. He first served as Deputy Assistant Secretary in the Bureau of Human Resources at the State Department. His numerous overseas postings include service as a political counselor in Nigeria in the late 1980s, in South Africa in the mid-1990s during the transition from apartheid to majority rule and also assignments in Lyon, Geneva and Paris.

Campbell also served as United States Ambassador to Nigeria. He was appointed by President George W. Bush and served from May 12, 2004, to July 19, 2007. He presented his credentials on June 25, 2004, and was succeeded by Robin R. Sanders.

In 2008, Campbell led an Office of the Inspector General's investigation into the U.S. mission in Mexico.

== Post-consular career ==
In July 2009 Campbell was given the post of acting director at the Office of the Historian after the removal of Marc Susser from the post. He left in September, after just two months, to work with the think tank Council on Foreign Relations, where he is the Ralph Bunche Senior Fellow for Africa policy studies.

In 2010, Campbell published his first book, titled Nigeria: Dancing on the Brink. The second edition of the book was published in June 2013. Campbell has also written Morning in South Africa, published in May 2016 and Nigeria: What Everyone Needs to Know, co-authored with Matthew Page and published in July 2018.

== See also ==
- Nigeria - United States relations
- Ambassadors of the United States

== Sources ==
- United States Department of State: Biography of John Campbell
- United States Embassy in Abuja: Biography of the ambassador

Diplomatic posts
Preceded by Howard Franklin Jeter	United States Ambassador to Nigeria; 2004–2007	Succeeded by Robin R. Sanders
