= Office of the Historian =

Office of the U.S. Dept. of State

Office overview
- Office executive: John Powers (performing the duties of), Historian
- Parent department: United States Department of State
- Parent Office: Government of the United States of America
- Website: history.state.gov

The Office of the Historian is an office of the United States Department of State within the Government of the United States of America. It is legally responsible for the preparation and publication of the official historical documentary record of U.S. foreign policy in the Foreign Relations of the United States series, which can be accessed at its website. It researches and writes historical studies on aspects of U.S. diplomacy for use by Department of State employees and the public.

The office makes recommendations to other bureaus regarding the identification, maintenance, and long-term preservation of important historical diplomatic records. Its outreach activities include participating in the planning and installation of the historical components of the department's planned United States Center for Diplomacy, counseling private scholars and journalists on historical research issues, and responding to government and public inquiries on diplomatic history questions.

== List of Directors of the Office of the Historian ==
#	Directors of the Office of the Historian	Term start	Term end
1	Gaillard Hunt	1919	1924
2	Harry Dwight	1924	1924
3	Tyler Dennett	1924	1931
4	David Hunter Miller	1931	1933
5	Cyril Wynne	1933	1939
6	E. Wilder Spaulding	1939	1946
7	George Bernard Noble	1946	1962
8	William Franklin	1962	1974
-	Fredrick Aandahl (acting)	1975	1976
9	David Trask	1976	1981
10	William Slany	1981	2000
11	Marc J. Susser	2001	2009
-	John Campbell (acting)	July 2009	September 2009
-	Edward P. Brynn (acting)	2009	2012
12	Stephen Randolph	2012	2017
-	Renee Goings (acting)	2018	2019
13	Adam Howard	2019	2025
-	John Powers (performing the duties of)	2025	present
