= George Noble =

George Noble may refer to:

- George Noble (politician) (1891–1949), Australian member of the New South Wales Legislative Assembly
- George Noble (engraver), English line-engraver
- George Bernard Noble (1892–1972), American scholar
- George Noble (darts referee) (born 1968), English darts referee
