= Diplomats and Military Commanders for Change =

Group supporting John Kerry in the 2004 presidential election

Diplomats and Military Commanders for Change (DMCC) was an ad hoc organization of 27 retired and United States military officers and Foreign Service Officers who supported Democratic U.S. Senator John Kerry of Massachusetts against incumbent Republican George W. Bush in the 2004 presidential election.

The group was formed in Washington, D.C., on June 16, 2004, at the National Press Club. The group published an open letter that stated that President George W. Bush had "failed in the primary responsibilities of preserving national security and providing world leadership" and had harmed foreign relations so badly that only a new leader can repair them.

This statement is especially noteworthy because several of the signatories had supported George W. Bush when he ran for president in 2000, and a large number were appointed to positions by Republican presidents, including Bush's father, President George H. W. Bush.

== Members ==
- Avis T. Bohlen, former Assistant Secretary of State for Arms Control and Ambassador to Bulgaria
- William J. Crowe, Ambassador to the United Kingdom under President Bill Clinton and Chairman of the Joint Chiefs of Staff under President Ronald Reagan
- Jeffrey Davidow, former Ambassador to Zambia, Venezuela, and Mexico.
- William DePree, former Ambassador to Bangladesh and Mozambique
- Donald B. Easum, former Ambassador to Nigeria and Upper Volta
- Charles W. Freeman, former Ambassador to Saudi Arabia
- William Harrop, former Ambassador to Israel
- Arthur A. Hartman, Ambassador to France and to the Soviet Union
- Joseph Hoar, former commander of United States Central Command
- H. Allen Holmes, former Assistant Secretary of Defense for Special Operations and former Ambassador to Portugal
- Robert V. Keeley, former Ambassador to Greece, Zimbabwe, and Mauritius
- Samuel Lewis, former Ambassador to Israel
- Princeton N. Lyman, former Assistant Secretary of State for International Organization Affairs, and Ambassador to South Africa and Nigeria
- Donald McHenry, former Ambassador to the United Nations
- Merrill McPeak, former Chief of Staff of the United States Air Force
- Jack F. Matlock, Jr., a member of the National Security Council staff under Reagan and Ambassador to the Soviet Union from 1987 to 1991
- George Moose, former Ambassador to Senegal and Benin
- David D. Newsom, former Ambassador to the Philippines and Indonesia
- Phyllis Oakley, former Assistant Secretary of State for Intelligence and Research
- Robert B. Oakley, former Ambassador to Pakistan, Somalia and Zaire
- James D. Phillips, former Ambassador to the Republic of the Congo and Burundi
- John Reinhardt, former Director of the United States Information Agency and Ambassador to Nigeria
- William Y. Smith, former Chief of Staff for Supreme Headquarters Allied Powers Europe
- Ronald I. Spiers, Under-Secretary-General of the United Nations for Political Affairs and former Ambassador to the Bahamas, Turkey, and Pakistan
- Michael Sterner, former Ambassador to the United Arab Emirates
- Stansfield Turner, former Director of the Central Intelligence Agency
- Alexander Watson, former Ambassador to Brazil and Peru

A 27th member, Robert B. Oakley, was announced June 15, 2004.
