= Senator Noble =

Senator Noble may refer to:

- George Bernard Noble (1892–1972), Oregon State Senate
- James H. Noble (1851–1912), Wisconsin State Senate
- James Noble (Indiana politician) (1785–1831), U.S. Senator from Indiana
- Larry Noble (politician) (fl. 2000s–2010s), Iowa State Senate
- Patrick Noble (1787–1840), 57th Governor of South Carolina

== See also ==
- T'wina Nobles (born 1981), Washington State Senate
