= Stephen Randolph (historian) =

US historian

Stephen P. Randolph

12th Department of State Historian
- In office 2012–2017
- President: Barack Obama; Donald Trump
- Preceded by: Marc J. Susser
- Succeeded by: Adam Howard

Personal details
- Education: Johns Hopkins University; George Washington University

Military service
- Allegiance: United States
- Branch/service: United States Air Force
- Rank: Colonel
- Battles/wars: Gulf War; Operation Desert Storm

Stephen P. Randolph is an American historian who served as Director of the Office of the Historian of the United States Department of State from 2012 to 2017.

== Education ==
Randolph graduated from the United States Air Force Academy in 1974 and then earned a MA in History of Science from the Johns Hopkins University in 1975 and a Ph.D. from George Washington University in 2005.

== Career ==
Previously to his arrival at the State Department, Randolph worked at the Eisenhower School of National Defense from 1997 to 2011 in various roles. Before working at the National Defense University, Randolph had spent 27 years in the U.S. Air Force, commanding a squadron during Operation Desert Storm and becoming a colonel by his retirement from service in 2001.

Randolph is the author of Powerful and Brutal Weapons: Nixon, Kissinger, and the Easter Offensive, published in 2007, and is the recipient of the 2018 Roger Trask Award which honours the work of historians that "reflects the unique importance of federal history".

Government offices
Preceded by Edward P. Brynn	Director of the Office of the Historian; 2012 – 2017	Succeeded by Adam Howard and Renée Goings
