= Senior Seminar in Foreign Policy =

Postgraduate seminar from the Foreign Service Institute

Location
- 4000 Arlington Blvd, Arlington, VA 22204

Information
- Other names: Executive Seminar in National and International Affairs
- Former name: Senior Officer Course
- Type: Seminar
- Established: 1958
- Authority: Foreign Service Institute
- Grades: Postgraduate

The Senior Seminar in Foreign Policy, also known as the Senior Executive Seminar, is an annual 10 month-long seminar for senior diplomats and officials offered by the Foreign Service Institute within the Department of State. The members of the seminar are selected from the ranks of the Foreign Service as well as civil and military personnel.

The classes range in size but stay consistently under 30. About half of the students are taken from the Foreign and Civil Service of the Department of State. The other half is usually made up of representatives of the different branches of the armed forces and intelligence agencies along with employees of the Department of the Treasury and USAID. The curriculum consists of numerous lectures by experts in different fields, field trips, independent and group research, and in-class discussion. The Seminar includes three major themes: personal improvement, US domestic affairs, and foreign affairs.

== History ==
The Senior Seminar was officially established in 1958 as the Senior Officer Course. The original idea for a graduate-level training course on foreign affairs in the State Department originated in 1926, when Loy Henderson proposed a sabbatical be established for senior officials in a memo to Assistant Secretary Wilbur Carr. The Foreign Service Act of 1946 created the Foreign Service Institute and suggested senior training be made available through the Institute but no training at this level was instituted in the immediate aftermath of the Act. In 1955, Henderson was made Deputy Undersecretary for Management and in late 1957, he asked Willard Barber to put together a course for senior leadership. Barber was the director of the political department at the National War College and after the course's creation he was in charge of the first seminar. Students at the Johns Hopkins University Paul H. Nitze School for Advanced International Studies submitted proposals for the curriculum for the seminar. The first two classes had only 19 students and was only nine months long.

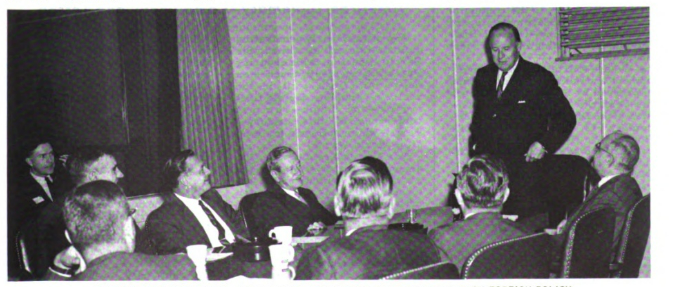
Representative Wayne Hays speaks to the Senior Seminar on Foreign Policy in 1966

The Senior Officer Course went through two name changes: in 1960 it was renamed the Senior Seminar in Foreign Policy and then in 1977 to the Executive Seminar in National and International Affairs. It has been colloquially called the Senior Seminar since it was renamed the first time.

In 1966, President Lyndon B. Johnson addressed the graduating class of the Senior Seminar.

In 2010, diplomat Allen L. Keiswetter was interviewed for the Association of Diplomatic Studies and Training about the Senior Seminar of 1989–1990. Keiswetter said that during this year, the students were heavily involved in planning the Seminar. It was also the first year the Seminar took a trip to Alaska.

== Purpose ==
The stated purpose of the Seminar is to "give selected officials...a ten-month opportunity for expanding and deepening their perceptivity of and perspectives on what is happening and why in America and the world. The emphasis is on broadening their understanding of the issues and forces at work in America and the world rather than on training in methods and techniques of management or other specific subjects."

Deputy Undersecretary of Management William Crockett said the seminar gives senior officials “an opportunity to step back and look at themselves, to get to know their country again intimately, to reevaluate their opportunities and responsibilities in its service and to think imaginatively about their profession and its problems.”

Henderson believed the Seminar would be "a launching pad for ambassadors."

== Graduates (non-exhaustive) ==
- Frank Almaguer (1990–1991)
- Alexander Arvizu (2003–2004)
- Thomas D. Boyatt (1974–1975)
- Katherine W. Bracken (1958-1959)
- Aurelia E. Brazeal (1986–1987)
- Patricia M. Byrne (1975–1976)
- Carey Cavanaugh (2001–2002)
- Andrew V. Corry
- Donald B. Easum
- Thomas Fingar (1992–1993)
- Thomas J. Hirschfeld
- Marilyn P. Johnson (1974–1975)
- Allen Keiswetter (1989–1990)
- R. Niels Marquardt
- Harvey Frans Nelson Jr. (1971)
- Cristobal R. Orozco (1989)
- Leo W. Smith II (1976–1977)
