= Joseph Palmer II =

American diplomat (1914–1994)

Joseph Palmer
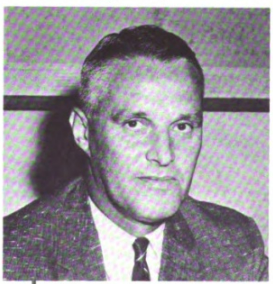
- Palmer in 1965

3rd Assistant Secretary of State for African Affairs
- In office April 11, 1966 – July 7, 1969
- Preceded by: G. Mennen Williams
- Succeeded by: David D. Newsom

9th Director General of the Foreign Service
- In office February 16, 1964 – April 10, 1966
- Preceded by: Tyler Thompson
- Succeeded by: John Milton Steeves

Personal details
- Born: June 16, 1914
- Died: August 15, 1994 (aged 80)
- Education: Harvard College; Georgetown University
- Occupation: American diplomat

Joseph Palmer II (June 16, 1914 – August 15, 1994) was an American diplomat and State Department official whose career focused on U.S. relations with Africa.

Palmer entered the United States Foreign Service in 1939. In 1941, he began a four-year tour of duty as consular officer in Nairobi. He then served as assistant chief of the African division of the State Department in Washington, 1945–49. He held various diplomatic positions in Africa throughout the 1950s.

In 1960, following agitation by Nigerian nationalists, the British Empire relinquished its control over Colonial Nigeria and Nigeria entered the Commonwealth of Nations as an independent nation on October 1, 1960. In preparation for Nigerian independence, on September 23, 1960, President Dwight D. Eisenhower appointed Palmer as the United States' first Ambassador to Nigeria. Palmer established the American embassy in Lagos on October 1, 1960, and presented his credentials to the Government of Nigeria three days later. The official Declaration of Independence was signed in the main boardroom of the Federal Palace Hotel in Lagos. When the Nigerian First Republic was proclaimed in October 1963, Palmer was re-accredited, presenting his new credentials to the government on December 12, 1963. Palmer's tenure as Ambassador to Nigeria ended on January 16, 1964.

President Lyndon B. Johnson appointed Palmer as Director General of the Foreign Service on February 16, 1964, and Palmer served in this capacity until April 10, 1966.

On April 1, 1966, President Lyndon B. Johnson appointed Palmer as the third U.S. Assistant Secretary of State for African Affairs. He served in this post until July 7, 1969.

The next day, he took up his position as the U.S. Ambassador to the Kingdom of Libya, having been appointed by President Richard Nixon. Palmer was present in Libya on September 1, 1969, when a group of military officers led by Muammar al-Gaddafi staged a coup d’état against King Idris while he was in Turkey for medical treatment. After the 1969 coup, Gaddafi closed American and British bases and partially nationalized foreign oil and commercial interests in Libya. Gaddafi's anti-American attitude and his support of international terrorism led the United States to recall Ambassador Palmer on November 7, 1972.

Government offices
Preceded by G. Mennen Williams	Assistant Secretary of State for African Affairs; April 11, 1966 – July 7, 1969	Succeeded by David D. Newsom
Diplomatic posts
Preceded by office established	United States Ambassador to Nigeria; 1960–1964	Succeeded by Elbert G. Mathews
Preceded by David D. Newsom	United States Ambassador to Libya; 1969–1972	Succeeded by no ambassador
