= Donald B. Easum =

American diplomat (1923–2016)

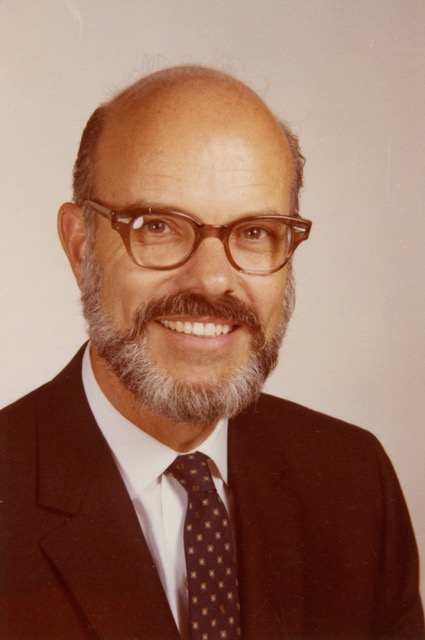
- Easum in 1974

5th United States Ambassador to Burkina Faso
- In office December 8, 1971 – January 19, 1974
- President: Richard Nixon
- Preceded by: William E. Schaufele, Jr.
- Succeeded by: Pierre R. Graham

5th United States Ambassador to Nigeria
- In office May 22, 1975 – October 15, 1979
- President: Gerald Ford
- Preceded by: John E. Reinhardt
- Succeeded by: Stephen Low

5th Assistant Secretary of State for African Affairs
- In office March 18, 1974 – March 26, 1975
- Preceded by: David D. Newsom
- Succeeded by: Nathaniel Davis

Personal details
- Born: Donald Boyd Easum; August 27, 1923 Culver, Indiana
- Died: April 16, 2016 (aged 92) Summit, New Jersey
- Spouse: Augusta M Pentecost (d. 1992)
- Profession: Diplomat

Donald Boyd Easum (August 27, 1923 – April 16, 2016) was an American diplomat.

== Foreign service ==
Easum spent 27 years in the United States Foreign Service at posts in Nicaragua, Indonesia, Senegal, the Gambia, Guinea-Bissau, Niger, Upper Volta (Ambassador, 1971–74) and Nigeria (Ambassador, 1975–79). During the Nixon/Ford Administration, Easum served as Assistant Secretary of State for African Affairs. Earlier State Department assignments included Executive Secretary of the United States Agency for International Development (USAID) and Staff Director of the United States National Security Council's Interdepartmental Group for Latin America. Easum was also president of the Africa-America Institute from 1980 to 1988.

In 2004, Easum was among 27 retired diplomats and military commanders called who publicly said the administration of President George W. Bush did not understand the world and was unable to handle "in either style or substance" the responsibilities of global leadership. On June 16, 2004, the Diplomats and Military Commanders for Change issued a statement against the Iraq War.

== Background and education ==
Easum was born in Culver, Union Township, Marshall County, Indiana, the son of Chester Verne Easum and Norma Moore Brown. He grew up in Madison, Wisconsin because his father taught at the University of Wisconsin. During World War II, Easum served in the United States Army Air Forces in the Pacific. Easum was Senior Fellow at Yale University's Stimson Seminar from 1998 to 2004 and taught at Princeton University’s Woodrow Wilson School of Public and International Affairs. He lectured widely in the United States, Europe and Africa on U.S.-African relations. Easum attended The Hotchkiss School, and held a B.A. degree (Phi Beta Kappa) from the University of Wisconsin–Madison. Easum also received his M.P.A. degree, in 1950, and his Ph.D. degree, in 1953, from Princeton University. He also studied at the University of London on a Fulbright scholarship and in Buenos Aires on a Doherty Foundation grant and a Penfield fellowship. He was a member of the American Academy of Diplomacy and Council on Foreign Relations. Easum lived in New York City.

== Writings ==
- La Prensa and the Freedom of the Press in Argentina, 1951
- "United States Policy Toward South Africa," Chapter 12 in Race and Politics in South Africa, edited by Ian Robertson and Philip Whitten, Transaction, Inc., New Brunswick, NJ, 1978
- The call for black studies, (U.S. Foreign Service Institute. Senior Seminar in Foreign Policy. Case study)

Diplomatic posts
Preceded by William E. Schaufele, Jr.	United States Ambassador to Burkina Faso; 1971–1974	Succeeded by Pierre R. Graham
Preceded by John Reinhardt	United States Ambassador to Nigeria; 1975–1979	Succeeded by Stephen Low
Political offices
Preceded by David D. Newsom	United States Assistant Secretary of State for African Affairs; 1974–1975	Succeeded by Nathaniel Davis
