= Stephen Low (diplomat) =

American diplomat

Stephen Low (December 2, 1927, Cincinnati – November 15, 2010) was an American diplomat. He was a graduate of Yale University and Fletcher School of Law and Diplomacy at Tufts University. He was a United States Ambassador to Zambia (1976–1979) and Nigeria (1979–1981) as well as Director of the Foreign Service Institute.

== Diplomatic career ==
Stephen Low was a Foreign Service officer.

He was a senior member of the National Security Council Staff from 1974 to 1976.

He was appointed Ambassador Extraordinary and Plenipotentiary to Zambia on August 5, 1976. He presented his credentials on August 31, 1976, and left the post on July 5, 1979. While serving in Lusaka he played a key role in the negotiations seeking a solution to the conflict in Rhodesia (now Zimbabwe), working along with British diplomat Johnny Graham as the U.S. member of the Anglo-American Consultative Team for Rhodesia. Low's solid work in Zambia was an important component of the U.S. contribution to the international efforts to facilitate a settlement for Rhodesia, helping to bring about the Lancaster House Agreement in December 1979 which led to the formation of independent Zimbabwe.

He was appointed Ambassador Extraordinary and Plenipotentiary to Nigeria on September 20, 1979. He presented his credentials on November 29, 1979, and left the post on July 4, 1981.

He was appointed Director of the Foreign Service Institute on May 4, 1982. His appointment was terminated on April 3, 1987.

Diplomatic posts
Preceded by Jean M. Wilkowski	United States Ambassador to Zambia; 1976–1979	Succeeded by Frank G. Wisner
Preceded by Donald B. Easum	United States Ambassador to Nigeria; 1979–1981	Succeeded by Thomas R. Pickering
