= Charles Trueheart =

American journalist and essayist (1951–2026)

- Born: September 5, 1951; Washington, D.C., U.S.
- Died: September 15, 2026 (aged 75); Staunton, Virginia, U.S.
- Education: Phillips Exeter Academy; Amherst College
- Occupations: Journalist; essayist
- Spouse: Anne Swardson
- Children: 2
- Father: William C. Trueheart

Charles Trueheart (September 5, 1951 – September 15, 2026) was an American writer, newspaper correspondent and non-profit executive. He was a reporter for The Washington Post from 1986 to 2000 and director of the American Library in Paris from 2007 to 2017. His book on Vietnam during the Kennedy years, Diplomats at War, was published in early 2024.

== Early life and career ==
Trueheart was born in Washington, D.C., on September 5, 1951. His father, William Trueheart, was a Foreign Service Officer with the U.S. State Department, and he grew up overseas, in Paris, Ankara, London, and Saigon. He graduated from Phillips Exeter Academy in 1969 and from Amherst College in 1973.

He began his journalism career during his time at Exeter, where he was a prolific contributor to the twice-weekly school paper, The Exonian. At Amherst, he was a managing editor of the Amherst Student, the college newspaper, and was elected to serve as chairman during 1973. After college, he worked as an editorial writer and book reviewer at the Greensboro Daily News in North Carolina from 1973 until 1978, then as an editorial page editor for the Baltimore News-American from 1978 to 1981. From 1981 to 1983 he was the West Coast correspondent for Publishers Weekly magazine, and from 1982 to 1986 he was a columnist for the newspaper USA Today. From 1983 to 1986, Trueheart served as associate director of the Harvard Institute of Politics, where he directed the Public Affairs Forum at the John F. Kennedy School of Government, and oversaw the training programs for newly elected American mayors and members of the US Congress.

In 1986 Trueheart returned to journalism, joining the staff of The Washington Post, covering books, authors, the publishing industry, and literary and intellectual issues. In 1992, he became a foreign correspondent for the Post, serving first as Canada correspondent and then as Paris correspondent (1996–2000), covering French politics and society and news throughout Europe, including extensive coverage of war crimes tribunals in The Hague.

Trueheart left the Post in 2000, and served briefly as counselor and speechwriter for the U.S. Ambassador to France, Felix Rohatyn. He became Director of the American Library in Paris, a position he held until he retired in 2017. He contributed essays and book reviews to the Atlantic Monthly and other publications, and was the Paris editor for The American Scholar magazine.

His history-cum-memoir, Diplomats at War: Friendship and Betrayal on the Brink of the Vietnam Conflict, was published in February 2024. "Charles Trueheart provides the most detailed account yet of Embassy Saigon's angle in America's 1963 decision to oust the Ngo regime", John Bolton wrote in The Wall Street Journal. "Trueheart understands that statecraft is a matter of loyalties that are almost always in conflict over what is best for the country", John Knight wrote in The New York Times. The book was the 2024 recipient of the Dillon Award from the American Academy of Diplomacy.

== Personal life and death ==
Trueheart was married to Anne Swardson, a retired Washington Post correspondent and former editor at Bloomberg News. She blogs and writes Paris-based mystery fiction. They had two children. Trueheart died from cancer at his home in Staunton, Virginia, on September 15, 2026, at the age of 75.

== Bibliography ==
- Trueheart, Charles (1971). Kyrie : letters to a friend. Boston: Houghton Mifflin. ISBN 978-0395121085.
- Trueheart, Charles (2024). Diplomats at War; Friendship and Betrayal on the Brink of the Vietnam Conflict. Charlottesville: University of Virginia Press. ISBN 978-0-8139-5128-7
