= Pierre R. Graham =

American diplomat (1922–1988)

Pierre Robert Graham

6th United States Ambassador to Burkina Faso
- In office July 30, 1974 – June 13, 1978
- President: Richard Nixon
- Preceded by: Donald B. Easum
- Succeeded by: Thomas D. Boyatt

Personal details
- Born: August 10, 1922 St. Nazaire, France
- Died: April 24, 1988 (aged 65)
- Resting place: Arlington National Cemetery
- Profession: Diplomat

Military service
- Branch/service: United States Navy
- Years of service: 1943–46
- Rank: Lieutenant
- Battles/wars: Pacific War, World War II

Pierre Robert Graham (August 10, 1922 – April 24, 1988) was an American diplomat. He was the United States Ambassador to Upper Volta (now Burkina Faso) from 1974 to 1978.

== Biography ==
Graham was born on August 10, 1922, at St. Nazaire, Brittany, France. His father, William H. Graham, who died in 1940, met and married his wife Jeanne Marie Augereau while serving in the US military during World War I in St. Nazaire. At the age of 19, Pierre left France for the United States enrolled in the Merchant Marine Academy in Kingsport, New York; after graduating, he continued to serve in the US Navy from 1943 through 1946 as a lieutenant in the Pacific. After the war, he married Lorraine Shurman, and received his master's degree from the University of Chicago.

Graham joined the U.S. Foreign Service in 1949. He saw overseas posts as an economic officer in Morocco from 1951 to 1954, political officer in Lebanon from 1954 to 1957, as well as France from 1957 to 1958, and deputy principal officer in Senegal from 1958 to 1961. He became a personnel officer to the U.S. State Department, in Washington, D.C., from 1962 to 1964. From 1964 to 1966, he was deputy chief of mission in Guinea. In 1966, he was detailed to the National War College. He was the U.S. representative to UNESCO in Paris from 1969 to 1979. He later became chargé d'Affaires in Jordan from 1973 to 1974. He was nominated as United States Ambassador to Upper Volta by President Nixon in 1974 and remained in that post until he retired in 1978.

Graham retired in the Maureillas-las-Illas near Céret, France, in the Pyrenees Mountains close to the border between France and Spain. He lived there with his second wife, Dr. Helgard Planken Graham (1928–2016) until he died on April 24, 1988. Graham left behind his sister and three daughters, Diane Lyn Cooper, Katherine Joan Graham, and Patricia Ann Reed, as well as five grandchildren in the United States, two nephews and their 3 daughters in France.

He is interred at Arlington National Cemetery.

Diplomatic posts
Preceded by Donald B. Easum	United States Ambassador to Burkina Faso; 1974–1978	Succeeded by Thomas D. Boyatt
