= William Y. Smith =

United States Air Force general

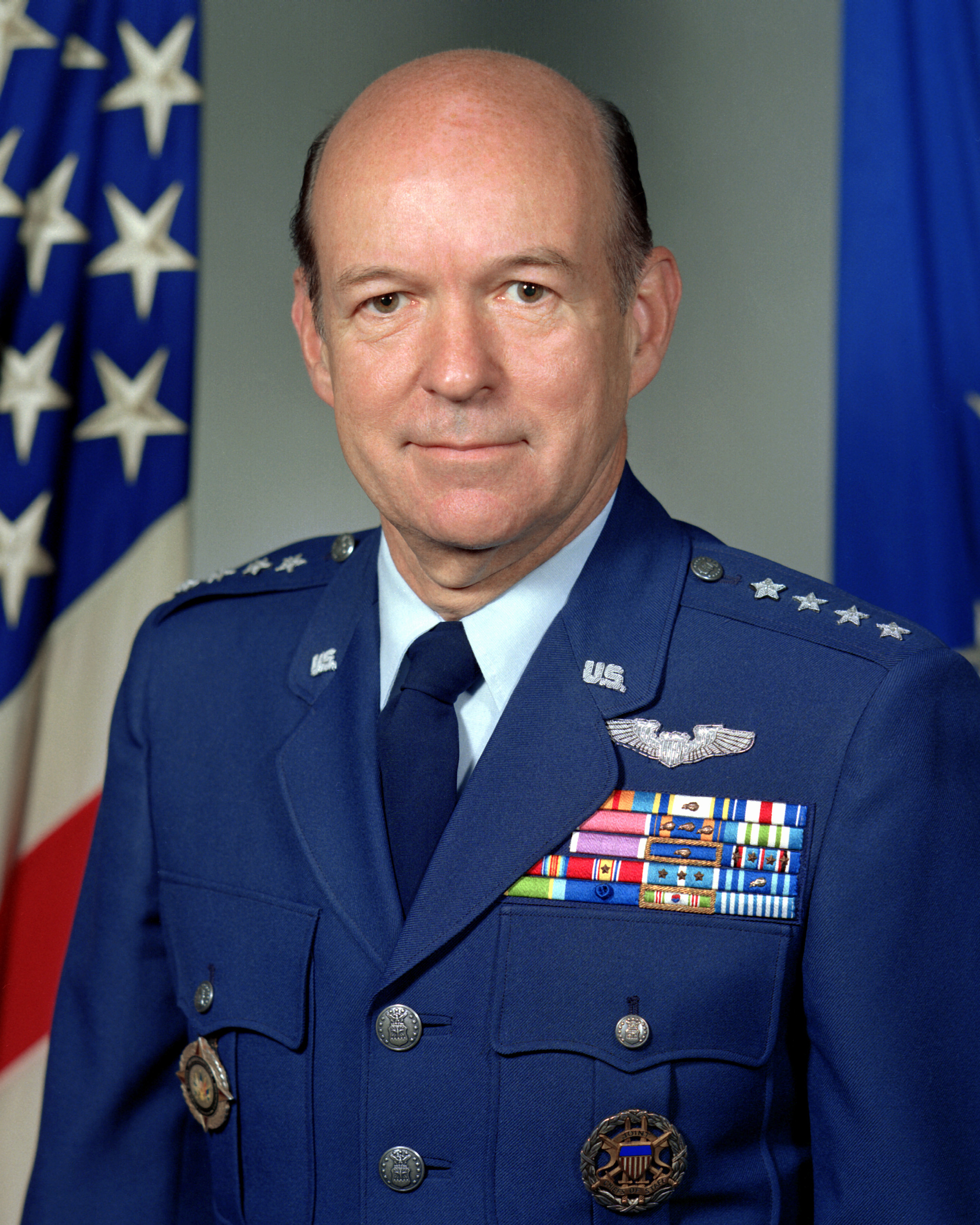
- Born: William Young Smith; August 13, 1925; Hot Springs, Arkansas
- Died: January 19, 2016 (aged 90); Falls Church, Virginia
- Military career
- Allegiance: United States
- Branch: United States Air Force
- Service years: 1948–1983
- Rank: General
- Nickname: Youngblood
- Conflicts: Korean War

William Young Smith (August 13, 1925 – January 19, 2016) was a United States Air Force four-star general who served as Chief of Staff, Supreme Headquarters Allied Powers Europe (COFS SHAPE) from 1979 to 1981 and as Deputy Commander in Chief, U.S. European Command (DCINCEUR) from 1981 until his retirement from military service in 1983.

== Life and career ==
Smith was born in 1925, in Hot Springs, Arkansas, where he graduated from high school in 1943. He spent one year at Washington and Lee University, then entered the United States Military Academy at West Point, New York. He graduated in 1948, among the first academy graduates commissioned directly into the newly established Air Force. He received a master of public administration degree in 1954 and a doctorate in political economy and government in 1961, both from Harvard University. He completed Air Command and Staff College, Maxwell Air Force Base, Alabama, in 1959 and National War College, Fort Lesley J. McNair, Washington, D.C., in 1965.

His first assignment was training recruits at Lackland Air Force Base, Texas. Subsequently, he went through flight training at Randolph Air Force Base, Texas, and Williams Air Force Base, Arizona, receiving his pilot wings in September 1949. He then served as a pilot with the 20th Fighter-Bomber Group at Shaw Air Force Base, South Carolina.

In March 1951 Smith was assigned to the 27th Fighter Escort Group at Itazuke Air Base, Japan, and flew combat missions over Korea in F-84 Thunderjets. He spent two months as a forward air controller with the U.S. Army's 25th Infantry Division. He next joined the 49th Fighter-Bomber Group and served as operations officer for combat crew training at Itazuke, then as assistant group operations officer at Taegu Air Base, South Korea, flying combat missions until hit by flak and wounded on his 97th mission.

After prolonged hospitalization, Smith attended Harvard University for graduate study in preparation for a teaching assignment with the department of social sciences at the U.S. Military Academy.

From August 1954 to July 1958, he taught government, economic and international relations, and attained the rank of associate professor at the U.S. Military Academy. He attended the Air Command and Staff College from August 1958 to June 1959. He spent that summer on special assignment with the president's committee to study the U.S. Military Assistance Program, the Draper Committee. In the fall he became a planning and programming officer with the deputy director of war plans in the Office of the Deputy Chief of Staff, Plans and Programs, Headquarters U.S. Air Force, Washington, D.C.

In July 1961 he moved to the White House as Air Force staff assistant to General Maxwell D. Taylor who was then military representative to President John F. Kennedy. When General Taylor became chairman of the Joint Chiefs of Staff in 1962, Smith worked in a dual capacity as an assistant to the chairman, Joint Chiefs of Staff, and as a staff member on the National Security Council under McGeorge Bundy. As a major, he became the first military person to serve simultaneously In these two positions.

Smith went to the National War College in August 1964 and after graduation in June 1965, was assigned to Headquarters U.S. Air Forces in Europe, Lindsey Air Station, Germany. He worked first in the Policy and Negotiations Division and later as chief, War Plans Division, both under the deputy chief of staff for operations. In July 1967 he became commander of the 603rd Air Base Wing at Sembach Air Base, Germany.

Following his return to the United States in July 1968, he became military assistant to the secretary of the Air Force, serving first with Secretary Harold Brown and subsequently with Secretary Robert C. Seamans Jr. In this position it was Smith's job to advise and assist the secretary on matters of substance, particularly operational, budgetary, joint-service and system acquisition matters. In addition he carried out special projects for the secretary.

He was appointed vice commander of the Oklahoma City Air Materiel Area, now the Oklahoma City Air Logistics Center in August 1971, and become commander in June 1972. The center provided logistics support for U.S. Air Force weapon systems that includes B-52s and associated missiles, A-7D's, C-135s and its configurations ranging from tankers to airborne command posts, command control communications systems, aircraft engines for Major Air Force combat and airlift aircraft, and component parts for various Air Force equipment.

In October 1973 Smith transferred to Air Force headquarters and served as director of doctrine, concepts and objectives in the Office of the Deputy Chief of Staff, Plans and Operations. In July 1974 he was appointed director of policy plans and National Security Council affairs, Office of the Assistant Secretary of Defense for International Security Affairs. He became assistant to the chairman, Organization of the Joint Chiefs of Staff, in September 1975.

He returned to Europe in July 1979 as chief of staff for Supreme Headquarters Allied Powers Europe, Belgium, and became Deputy Commander in Chief, U.S. European Command in June 1981.

His military decorations and awards include the Defense Distinguished Service Medal, Distinguished Service Medal (Air Force) with oak leaf cluster, Silver Star, Legion of Merit, Air Medal with three oak leaf clusters, Joint Service Commendation Medal and Purple Heart.

He was promoted to general July 1, 1979, with same date of rank and retired on July 31, 1983. In retirement from the Air Force, he became a Fellow at the Woodrow Wilson International Center for Scholars, and later served for five years as President of the Institute for Defense Analyses (IDA), a federally funded research center. Smith was also President of the Air Force Historical Foundation and a board member of the National Security Archive. He also participated in a number of oral history projects on nuclear deterrence and arms control. He died on January 19, 2016, of congestive heart failure.

Smith co-authored Operation Anadyr: U.S. and Soviet Generals Recount the Cuban Missile Crisis with former Soviet Union General Anatoly Gribkov, published in 1994, about their experiences on opposite sides of the Cuban Missile Crisis.

In 2004, Smith was among 27 retired diplomats and military commanders who publicly said the administration of President George W. Bush did not understand the world and was unable to handle "in either style or substance" the responsibilities of global leadership. On June 16, 2004, the Diplomats and Military Commanders for Change issued a statement against the Iraq War.

General Smith was inducted into the Arkansas Aviation Historical Society's Hall of Fame in 2017.
