= John E. Reinhardt =

American diplomat (1920–2016)

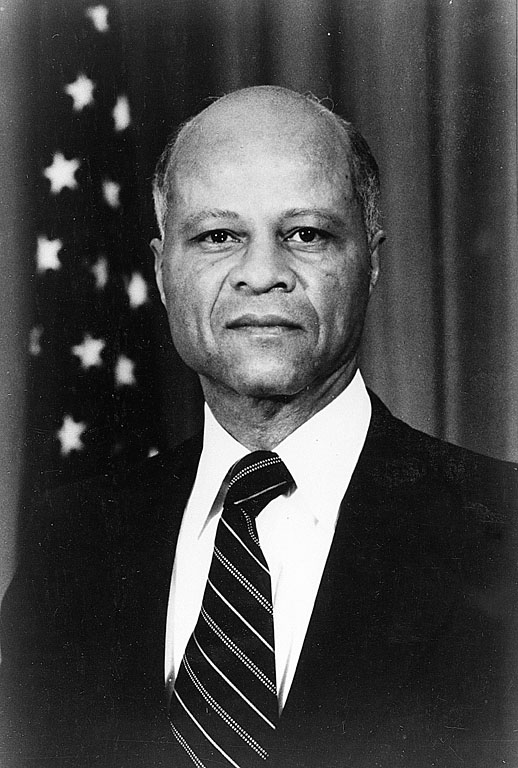

United States Ambassador to Nigeria
- In office December 3, 1971 – February 23, 1975
- President: Richard Nixon; Gerald Ford
- Preceded by: William C. Trueheart
- Succeeded by: Donald B. Easum

14th Assistant Secretary of State for Public Affairs
- In office April 22, 1975 – March 22, 1977
- Preceded by: Carol Laise
- Succeeded by: Hodding Carter III

Personal details
- Born: John Edward Reinhardt; March 8, 1920 Knoxville, Tennessee, U.S.
- Died: February 18, 2016 (aged 95) Silver Spring, Maryland, U.S.
- Education: Knoxville College; University of Chicago; University of Wisconsin–Madison

John Edward Reinhardt (March 8, 1920 – February 18, 2016) was an American ambassador and diplomat. He was the first career diplomat to head the U.S. Information Agency (USIA) and the first Black Assistant Secretary of State for Public Affairs.

== Early life and army service ==
Reinhardt was born in Glade Spring, Virginia and raised in Knoxville, Tennessee. He attended segregated schools growing up. After graduating from Knoxville College in 1939, he attended the University of Chicago, initially pursuing a graduate degree in English, but did not finish on account to serving in World War II. He taught at Fayetteville State University from 1941 until he was drafted in 1942.

The army was segregated when Reinhardt served so he was assigned to a Black regiment. He was assigned domestically to protect from terrorist attacks. His regiment was sent to Italy with the 92nd Infantry Division, but Reinhardt was selected to attend Officer Candidate School instead. He was sent to the Dutch East Indies to prepare for a projected invasion of Japan, but the war was largely over by this time. He left the Army with the rank of Staff Sargent.

Reinhardt received his master's in 1947 and his doctorate in English in 1950 from the University of Wisconsin–Madison. He then became a faculty member at Virginia State University.

== Career ==
Reinhardt became a Foreign Service Officer in 1956, joining the USIA. His early positions included tours in Japan, the Philippines, and Iran. In 1966, he was promoted to the USIA Assistant Director for Africa and the Far East.

He was the U.S. ambassador to Nigeria from 1971 to 1975. He was the first African American in this position. Reinhardt said that the hardest part of his tour in Nigeria was justifying the U.S. import of chrome from the white separatist state of Rhodesia.

In 1975, Reinhardt became the Assistant Secretary of State for Public Affairs. He was part of the team that helped Rhodesia shift from white-minority to Black-majority rule. President Jimmy Carter appointed Reinhardt to become the director of the USIA in 1977. During his tenure, the agency was renamed the International Communication Agency and grew to include the Voice of America and the State Department's Bureau of Educational and Cultural Affairs. Reinhardt retired from the State Department in 1980.

Reinhardt was a part of many different boards following his retirement, including the American Academy of Diplomacy, Georgetown University’s Institute for the Study of Diplomacy, the Population Council of America, and the Middle East Institute. He was also a member of the Peabody Awards Board of Jurors from 1980 to 1987.

Reinhardt later was a professor of political science at the University of Vermont from 1987 to 1991. In 1988, Reinhardt was honored as a U.S. Institute of Peace Distinguished Fellow. On June 16, 2004 he joined a group of twenty-seven called Diplomats and Military Commanders for Change opposing the Iraq War.

== Legacy and death ==
Richard T. Arndt, in his book The First Resort of Kings: American Cultural Diplomacy in the Twentieth Century, wrote that Reinhardt was, "the real thing, a genuine practicing cultural diplomat."

Reinhardt died on February 18, 2016 at the age of 95.

Government offices
Preceded by Carol Laise	Assistant Secretary of State for Public Affairs; April 22, 1975 – March 22, 1977	Succeeded by Hodding Carter III
Diplomatic posts
Preceded by William C. Trueheart	United States Ambassador to Nigeria; 1971–1975	Succeeded by Donald B. Easum
