= Jean M. Wilkowski =

American diplomat (1919–2016)

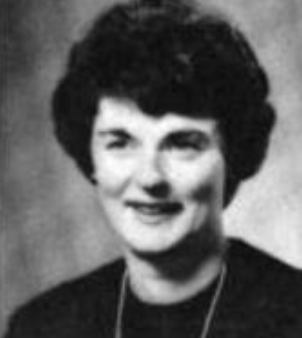
- Jean M. Wilkowski, from a 1962 publication of the U.S. State Department

US Ambassador to Zambia
- In office June 27, 1972 – July 24, 1976
- President: Richard Nixon; Gerald Ford
- Preceded by: Oliver L. Troxel, Jr.
- Succeeded by: Stephen Low

Personal details
- Born: August 28, 1919 Rhinelander, Wisconsin, U.S.
- Died: July 27, 2016 (aged 96) Bethesda, Maryland, U.S.
- Education: Saint Mary-of-the-Woods College, University of Wisconsin

Jean Mary Wilkowski (August 28, 1919 – July 27, 2016) was the first woman to serve as an American ambassador to an African country, when she was posted to Zambia from 1972 until 1976.

== Early life and education ==
Jean Mary Wilkowski was born in Rhinelander, Wisconsin, the daughter of Ernest William Wilkowski and Mary Margaret "Mae" Dorgan Wilkowski. Both of her parents were born in Wisconsin. Her father ran a hotel in Fond du Lac. She went to high school in Florida, and graduated from Saint Mary-of-the-Woods College in Indiana, with a degree in journalism. She later earned a master's degree from the University of Wisconsin.

== Career ==
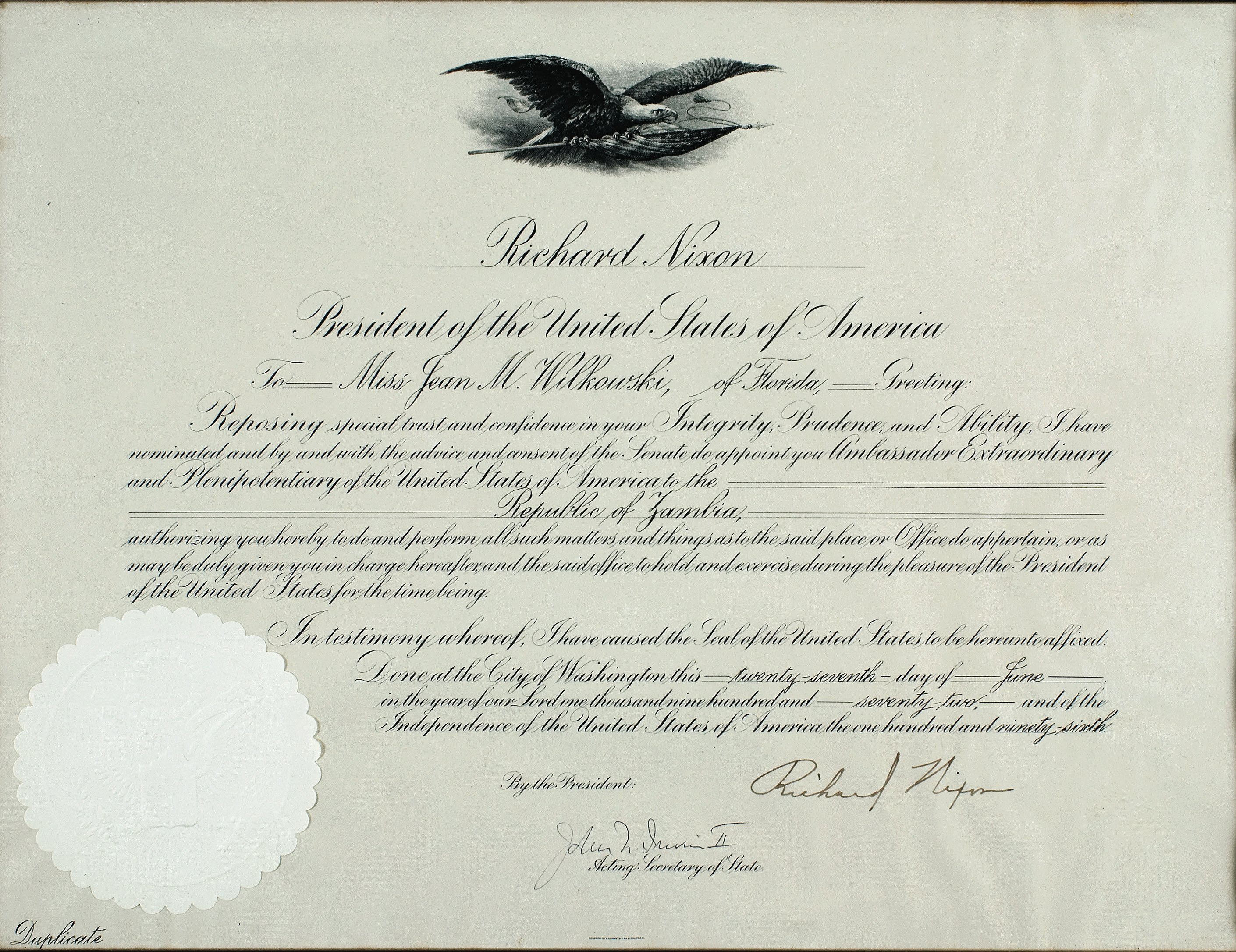
Jean Wilkowski's 1972 commission as ambassador to Zambia

Wilkowski taught at Barry College in Florida as a young woman. She joined the US Foreign Service in 1944, first as a Foreign Service Auxiliary, and then as a Foreign Service Officer, serving in Trinidad, Bogota, Santiago, Milan, Paris, and Rome. In 1966, she became Deputy Chief of Mission (DCM) at the American embassy in Tegucigalpa, Honduras. In 1969, she was briefly the Chargé d'affaires, the first woman to serve in that role in a Latin American embassy. In 1971, she was awarded the Saint Mother Theodore Guerin Award and in 2003, the Distinguished Alumni Award by her undergraduate alma mater. In 1972, she was awarded the Grand Cross of the Order "pro Merito Melitense" by the Sovereign Military Order of Malta for her efforts to aid persons displaced by the 1969 Honduras/El Salvador hostilities.

Wilkowski became the first woman to serve as an American ambassador to an African country, when she was posted to Zambia in 1972. She organized Duke Ellington's visit to Zambia in 1973, and negotiated a Food for Peace loan from the United States. She remained as ambassador there until 1976.

Wilkowski later served as the American coordinator of preparations for the United Nations Conference on Science and Technology for Development in 1977. She was the first ambassador to lend collected artifacts to the National Museum of American Diplomacy, and after her death, her estate made the loans into permanent donations.

In retirement after 1980, Wilkowski consulted for the Association of Catholic Colleges and Universities, served on the International Policy Committee for the U.S. Catholic Conference, and was a visiting fellow at the Woodrow Wilson National Fellowship Foundation. She served on the board of trustees of Barry University, where she was added to the school's Wall of Honor in 2002. She was a member of the DACOR Legacy Society.

Her autobiography, Abroad for Her Country: Tales of a Pioneer Woman Ambassador in the U.S. Foreign Service (2008), was published by the University of Notre Dame Press.

== Personal life ==
Wilkowski died in Bethesda, Maryland in 2016, at age 96.
