= Thomas J. Hirschfeld =

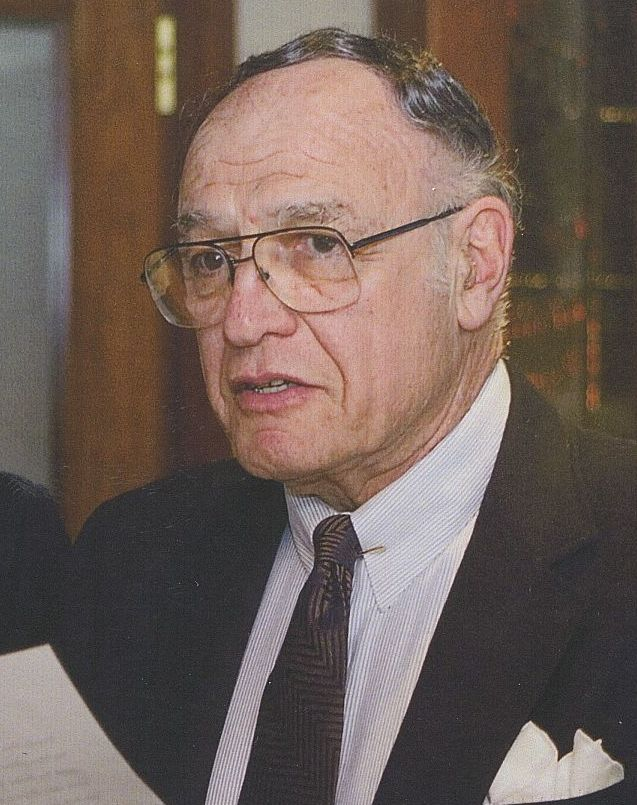
Thomas J. Hirschfeld (1930-2012)

Thomas Johannes Hirschfeld (June 21, 1930 – December 9, 2012) was a United States Foreign Service Officer and State Department official who served as Deputy Assistant Director of the Arms Control and Disarmament Agency in the Carter administration. In 1979, he became the Deputy Head (Minister) of the Mutual and Balanced Force Reductions delegation negotiating troop withdrawals from Europe between NATO and the Warsaw Pact states in Vienna, Austria, and was appointed acting head in 1981.

After he left government service, he held several positions in the private sector, including stints as Tom Slick Professor of World Peace at the University of Texas, Austin (1986–87), Senior Analyst at the RAND Corporation (1988–92), and the Center for Naval Analyses (1992-2006), where he worked on naval and arms control issues in the far east. Hirschfeld was the author of Intelligence and Arms Control: a Marriage of Convenience as well as many articles on national security and nuclear nonproliferation.

== Early life ==
Hirschfeld was born in Mannheim, Germany in 1930, came to the US as a child in 1936 and grew up in the New York area. He graduated from the University of Pennsylvania and received his Master of Arts from Columbia University. He served as a Marine officer during the last year of the Korean War.

== Early U.S. State Department career ==
In 1956 Hirschfeld joined the United States Foreign Service and was posted to the State Department's Office of Intelligence and Research. This was followed by postings in Stockholm, Phnom Penh, and Bonn. Returning to Washington in 1970, he was appointed Deputy Chief of the Regional Affairs Division of the US Arms Control and Disarmament Agency. In this position he served as a member of the US delegation to the 1972 Conference on Security and Cooperation In Europe (Helsinki) and as senior advisor to the preliminary talks between the US and USSR on troop reductions in Europe (Vienna). He became chief of the Regional Affairs Division late in 1973.

== Later State Department career ==
After spending a year at the Senior Seminar in Foreign Policy, the Department of State's program for training senior officers, he worked on science and technology issues, including technology, arms control, and terrorism for the Secretary of State's Policy Planning Staff. In 1977, Hirschfeld was selected as Deputy Assistant Director of the US Arms Control and Disarmament Agency, analyzing arms control impact of US weapons programs, and administering the Carter Administration's efforts to control the global arms trade by international agreement. In 1979, he became the Deputy Head (Minister) of the US Delegation to the delegation, becoming acting head in 1981.

== Private sector career ==
Hirschfeld retired from State Department in February 1982. After retirement, he was a Fellow of the Woodrow Wilson Foundation, a Guest Scholar at the Woodrow Wilson Center (Smithsonian), and 1986-87 Distinguished Visiting Tom Slick Professor of World Peace at the University of Texas, Austin He became a Consultant to the RAND Corporation in 1988 and was hired the following year as a Senior Analyst in Santa Monica CA. He left for a similar position at the Center for Naval Analyses (Alexandria, Virginia), where he worked from 1992 to 2006.
