= Katherine Bracken =

Foreign Service Officer and female pioneer in State Department

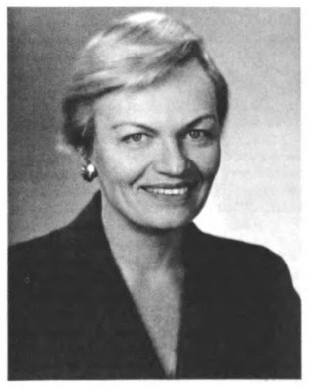

Director of the Office of Central American and Panamanian Affairs
- In office 1961–1962
- President: John F. Kennedy

Director of the Office of Greek, Turkish, and Iranian Affairs
- In office November 1962 – 1966
- President: John F. Kennedy; Lyndon B. Johnson

Katherine W. Bracken was one of the few high-ranking female Foreign Service Officers (FSO) for the US Department of State in the late 1950s–1960s. She is notable for working at the department and continuing to climb the ranks as a married woman during a time when the informal rule was for women to retire as soon as they were married.

== Life ==
Bracken was originally from Dania Beach, Florida. She, with her husband James, had a daughter in 1950 and a son in 1954.

Her career with the Foreign Service began in 1940 as a clerk in the US Embassy in Guatemala. She later worked in Montevideo in a similar position. Bracken passed the Foreign Service exam in 1946 and subsequently worked in the Middle East, Greece, Turkey, Iran, and India as Vice Consul or Consul. In Greece, she served as the Counselor of Embassy for Political Affairs. Bracken was the first woman to be enrolled in the Senior Seminar in Foreign Policy in 1946.

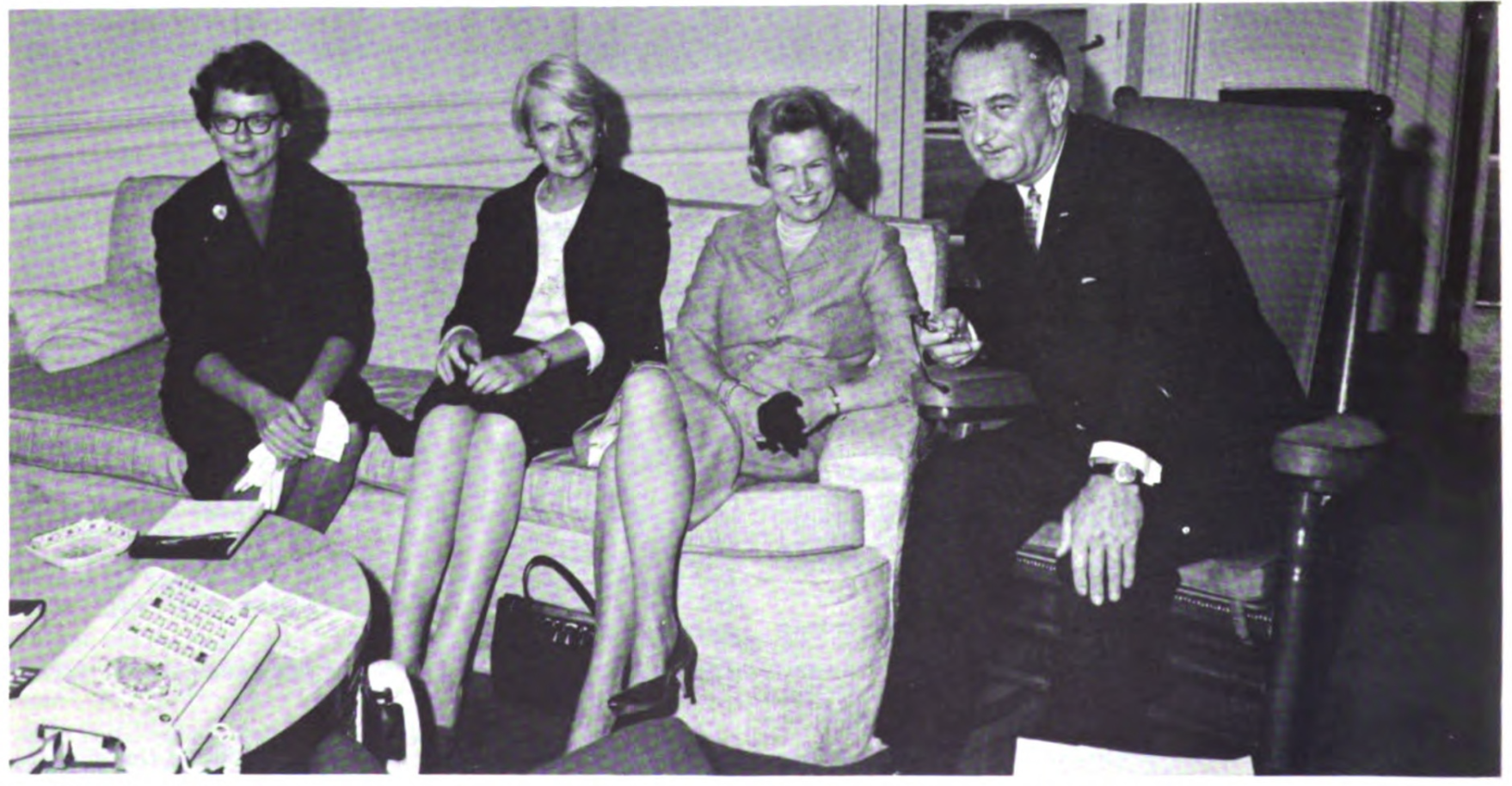
President Lyndon B. Johnson poses with recently promoted female FSOs, Bracken is in the middle

Among other positions, she served as the US Consul General in Istanbul, the Director of the Office of Central American and Panamanian Affairs in the Bureau of Inter-American Affairs in 1961, and the Director of the Office of Greek, Turkish, and Iranian Affairs from November 1962 until 1966. According to Peter B. Swiers, Consular Officer to Athens from 1961 to 1964, Bracken was one of the most well-known examples of women in higher positions on the political/economic side of the State Department. In 1962, Bracken was presented the Federal Woman's Award as the third highest ranking woman in the Foreign Service and the "only woman Officer Director in the Department's five Regional Bureaus." She was only the second woman in the Department of State to win this award.

Bracken was fluent in Greek, Turkish, Persian, and Spanish and was well-renowned for going above and beyond the language expectations of FSOs. After being assigned to serve as the US Consul General in Istanbul, the Foreign Service Institute proposed Bracken study Turkish at Princeton University in 1953. Princeton did not accept female students, but did accept Bracken after the dean of FSI threatened to stop sending FSOs to study there, under the condition that Bracken not be granted a degree, nor provided with university housing and facilities.

Bracken retired from the Foreign Service in May 1967.
