= E. Allan Lightner Jr. =

American diplomat (1907–1990)

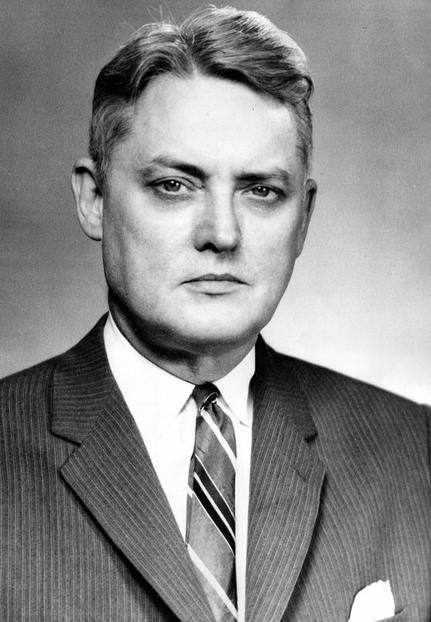

US Ambassador to Libya
- In office May 3, 1963 – June 30, 1965
- President: John F. Kennedy
- Preceded by: John Wesley Jones
- Succeeded by: David D. Newsom

Personal details
- Born: Edwin Allan Lightner Jr. December 7, 1907 New York City, U.S.
- Died: September 15, 1990 (aged 82) Belfast, Maine, U.S.
- Resting place: Rock Creek Cemetery
- Spouse: Dorothy M. Boyce
- Children: 3

Edwin Allan Lightner Jr. (December 7, 1907 - September 15, 1990) was an American diplomat and academic. He served as Ambassador to Libya from 1963 to 1965. In 1961 while serving as assistant chief of the U.S. Mission in Berlin, Lightner was detained twice by East German border guards in October 1961 when he crossed into East Berlin to underscore the United States' determination to have unrestricted access to all occupation zones in Berlin. He also participated in the Berlin exchange of Francis Gary Powers, the American U-2 pilot shot down during a reconnaissance flight over the Soviet Union in 1960.

== Early life ==
Lightner was born on December 7, 1907, in New York City and graduated from Princeton University in 1930. He and his wife, Dorothy M. Boyce, had three children.

== Working for the State Department ==
In 1930, Lightner joined the United States Department of State. He was primarily active overseas, visiting a total of 18 countries in Latin America, Europe, Africa, and Asia until his retirement in 1970. He became Assistant Director for the Central European Division from 1945 to 1947; Deputy Director of the Central European Division from 1947 to 1948; Deputy Political Director for the High Commission in Frankfurt from 1949 to 1951. He then became chargé d'affaires of the U.S. Embassy in South Korea (March 1, 1951 to February 1953), Consul General in Munich from 1953 to 1956, and Deputy Assistant Secretary of State for Public Affairs from May 14, 1956 to June 1959. Lightner also became assistant chief of the U.S. Mission in West Berlin from 1960 to May 1963. While stationed in Berlin, he witnessed the construction of the Berlin Wall in August 1961. Lightner had unrestricted access to all occupied areas within the city and occasionally entered East Berlin at the direction of the American government. Lightner was detained twice by East German border guards in October 1961. On 22 October, he was stopped on his way to the opera house in East Berlin by East German border guards, who demanded to see his passport, while Lightner insisted only Soviet officials had the right to check. After requests to summon a Soviet officer were denied, the US forces in Berlin deployed a tank-infantry team to the checkpoint, and Lightner was escorted into East Berlin with an armed military police escort.

In February 1962, he was present at the prisoner exchange at the Glienicke Bridge between American U-2 pilot Francis Gary Powers, who had been captured by KGB, and Rudolf Abel, a Soviet intelligence officer who had been captured by the FBI. After the incident, Lightner became an Ambassador to Libya from May 27, 1963 to June 30, 1965. He assisted in negotiations between the United States and the Libyan government regarding the Wheelus Air Base in Tripoli, which asked what they could use for their base.

== Later years ==
Lightner served as vice provost for international affairs at the National Defense University from 1967 to 1970. He died of congestive heart failure at the age of 82 on September 15, 1990, at his home in Belfast, Maine. He was buried in Section 2 of Rock Creek Cemetery in Washington, D.C.
