= Thomas D. Boyatt =

American diplomat

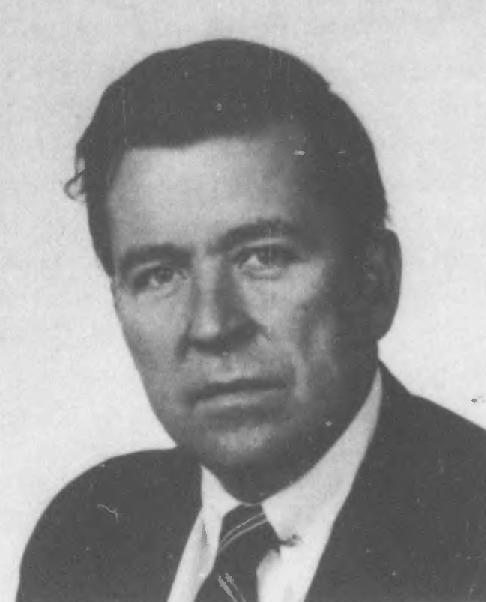

18th United States Ambassador to Colombia
- In office December 3, 1980 – April 14, 1983
- President: Jimmy Carter; Ronald Reagan
- Preceded by: Diego C. Asencio
- Succeeded by: Lewis Arthur Tambs

7th United States Ambassador to Burkina Faso
- In office September 21, 1978 – October 23, 1980
- President: Jimmy Carter
- Preceded by: Pierre R. Graham
- Succeeded by: Julius Waring Walker, Jr.

Personal details
- Born: Thomas David Boyatt; March 4, 1933 (age 93) Cincinnati, Ohio, U.S.
- Spouse: Maxine Shearwood
- Profession: Diplomat

Thomas David Boyatt (born March 4, 1933) is a former diplomat and United States Ambassador to Upper Volta (1978–80) and Colombia (1980–83). He is a member of the American Academy of Diplomacy. He was held captive for six days in a Palestinian hijacking in the 1960s. He graduated from Wyoming High School in 1951. He continues to return to his former high school to speak to students during the Wyoming School Foundation Day.

== Biography ==
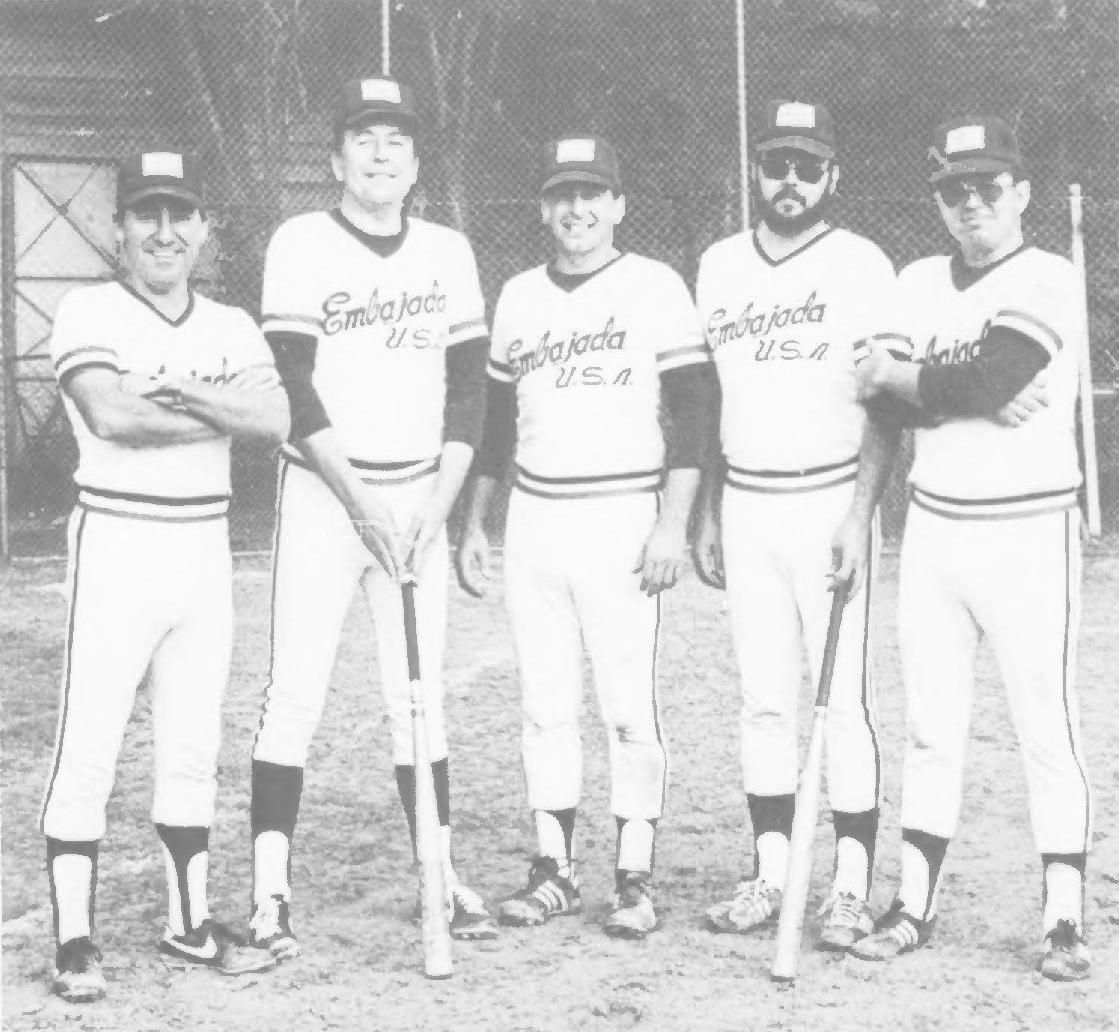
Boyatt (second from left) with the embassy softball team in Colombia

After Boyatt was born in Ohio and graduated from Wyoming High School in 1951, he graduated from Princeton University with his B.A. in 1955. He later received his M.A. from the Fletcher School of Law and Diplomacy. He served in the U.S. Air Force from 1956 to 1959.

Boyatt joined the U.S. Foreign Service in 1959. He served in various diplomatic posts around the globe, including Vice Consul in Chile from 1960 to 1962, Assistant to the Under Secretary of the Treasury (1962–1964), Economic Officer in Luxembourg (1964–1966), and Political Counselor in Cyprus (1967–1970). He later became Special Assistant to the Assistant Secretary of State for the Near East in Washington D.C.. He was Director of Cyprus Affairs from 1971 to 1974, and was named a member of the Senior Seminar in Foreign Policy the following year. In 1975 Boyatt became Minister-Counselor at the American Embassy in Chile. Boyatt was nominated to be the United States Ambassador to Upper Volta in 1978 by President Jimmy Carter, and in 1980 he was again nominated to serve diplomatically as the United States Ambassador to Colombia. In 1983 Boyatt was promoted to the rank of Career Minister in the Foreign Service.

In 1969, Boyatt was taken hostage on board a TWA plane by Palestinian guerillas during the 1969 TWA Flight 840 hijacking. Boyatt and the other passengers were later released, and Boyatt has received many medals and awards for his bravery and heroism during the hijacking.

Although Boyatt retired from the Foreign service in 1985, he became Vice President of Sears World Trade and President of U.S. Defense Systems (USDS) in 1990. Boyatt later became a member of the Advisory Boards of the Woodrow Wilson School at Princeton University and trustee from 1984 to 1988. He has also been a member of the Advisory Boards of the Patterson School at the University of Kentucky and is currently a Director of the Institute for the Study of Diplomacy at Georgetown University, where he teaches. He is President of the Foreign Affairs Council, an umbrella group comprising eleven organizations which support the Foreign Service, and Treasurer of AFSA-PAC. He is a member of the American Academy of Diplomacy and several other corporate and non-profit boards. He is married to Maxine Freedom Boyatt and has five children, Christopher Lynn Boyatt being one of his sons.

== Awards and honors ==
- Meritorious Honor Award from the U.S. State Department – 1969
- William R. Rivkin Award – 1970
- Christian A. Herter Award - 1979
- Foreign Service Cup – 1999
- Lifetime Achievement Award from the American Foreign Service Association (AFSA) – 2001
- Lifetime Contributions to American Diplomacy Award. – 2008

Boyatt has also been decorated by several other governments and organizations.

Diplomatic posts
Preceded by Pierre R. Graham	United States Ambassador to Burkina Faso; 1978–1980	Succeeded by Julius Waring Walker, Jr.
Preceded by Diego C. Asencio	United States Ambassador to Colombia; 1980–1983	Succeeded by Lewis Arthur Tambs
