= Howard Franklin Jeter =

Retired American diplomat (born 1947)

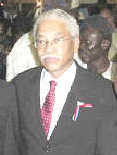

United States Ambassador to Nigeria
- In office January 18, 2001 – July 30, 2003
- President: Bill Clinton; George W. Bush
- Preceded by: William H. Twaddell
- Succeeded by: John Campbell

United States Ambassador to Botswana
- In office July 16, 1993 – June 21, 1996
- President: Bill Clinton
- Preceded by: David Passage
- Succeeded by: Robert Krueger

Personal details
- Born: March 6, 1947 (age 79) Union County, South Carolina, U.S.
- Education: Morehouse College (B.A.); Columbia University (M.A.); University of California, Los Angeles (M.A.)

Howard Franklin Jeter (born March 6, 1947) is an American retired diplomat. From 2001 to 2003, Jeter served as U.S. Ambassador to Nigeria. Prior to this, Jeter represented the United States in a diplomatic capacity in Botswana, Lesotho, and Namibia.

== Early life and education ==
Jeter was born on March 6, 1947, in Maple Ridge, Union County, South Carolina., to James Walter Jeter Jr. and Emma Mattocks Jeter. He had a brother, James Randolph Jeter, and a sister, Jacquelyn Jeter.

Jeter first attended school in a one-room schoolhouse in Maple Ridge. The school had no electricity, heat, or indoor plumbing. In high school, Jeter played the clarinet and drums in the school band and was in the drama club. Jeter graduated from Sims High School in 1964 as the class valedictorian.

He went on to earn a B.A. in Political Science from Morehouse College. Jeter later received an M.A. in International Relations and Comparative Politics from Columbia University and an M.A. in African Area Studies from the University of California, Los Angeles.

Jeter was a legislative intern in the Georgia House of Representatives. From 1967 to 1968, Jeter studied abroad in Nantes, France, where his host family nicknamed him "Franc", supposedly because they found "Howard" to be too difficult to pronounce.

== Career ==
Jeter served as U.S. Ambassador to Botswana from 1993 to 1996. In July 1996, he was appointed Special Presidential Envoy for Liberia. He later served as Deputy Assistant Secretary for African Affairs from June 1999 to July 2000. During his career, Franklin also served as Charge d’Affaires, a.i. in Lesotho and Namibia.

Jeter served as U.S. Ambassador to Nigeria from January 18, 2001, to July 30, 2003. After retiring from a 24 year career at the Foreign Service in 2003, Jeter became the Principal at Four Ways Enterprise, LLC.

== Personal life ==
In addition to English, Jeter speaks Portuguese, Swahili, and French. Jeter is married and has two children.

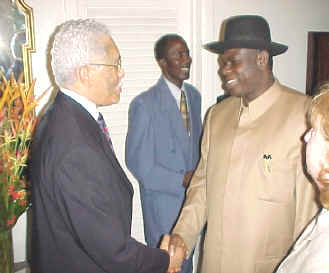
Jeter (left) with Diepreye Alamieyeseigha, Governor of Bayelsa State, (right) on July 6, 2001
