= TWA Flight 840 (1969) =

Plane hijacking

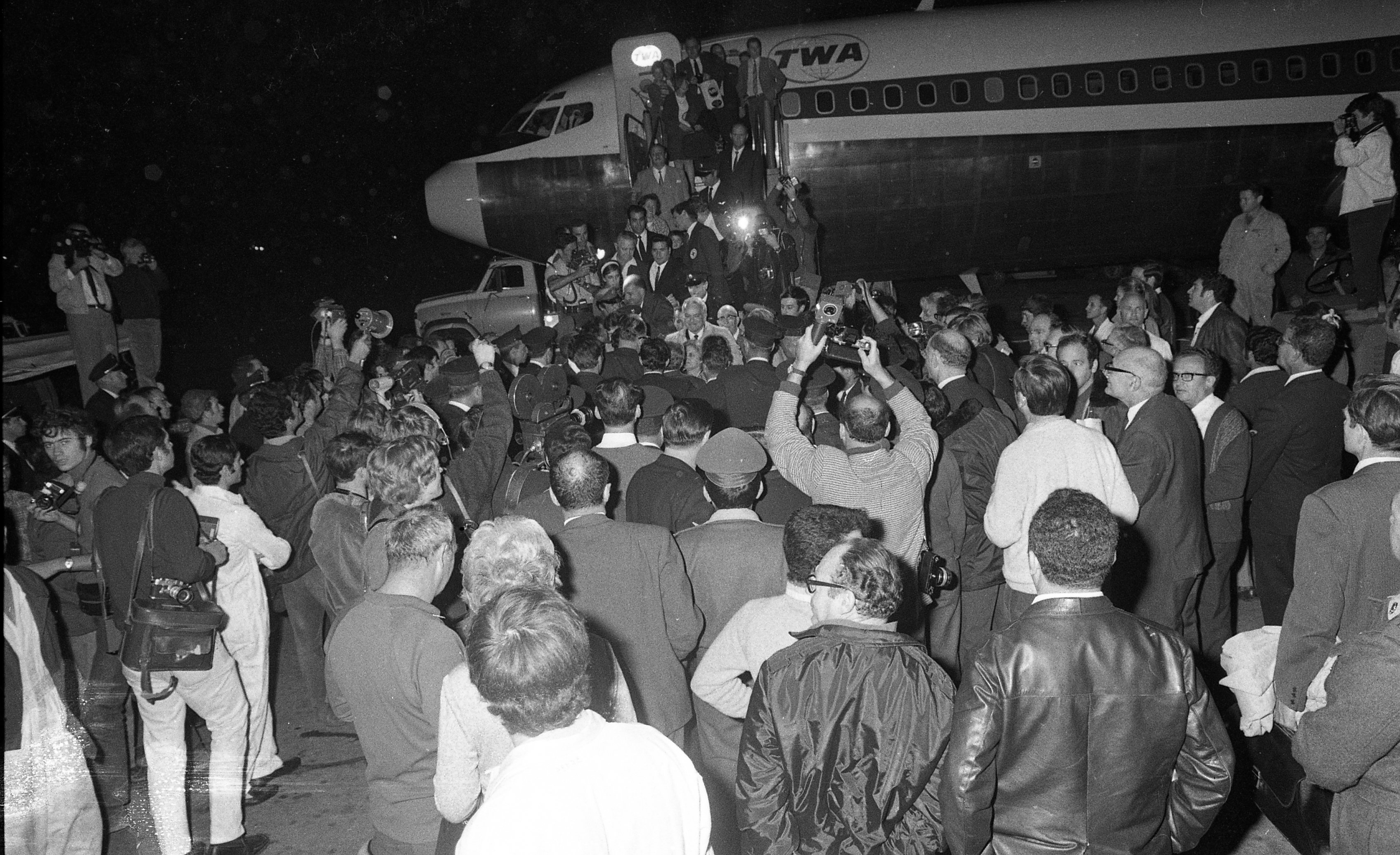
- Journalists awaiting the return of the hostages, 1969

Hijacking
- Date: 29 August 1969
- Summary: Hijacking
- Site: Greek airspace

Aircraft
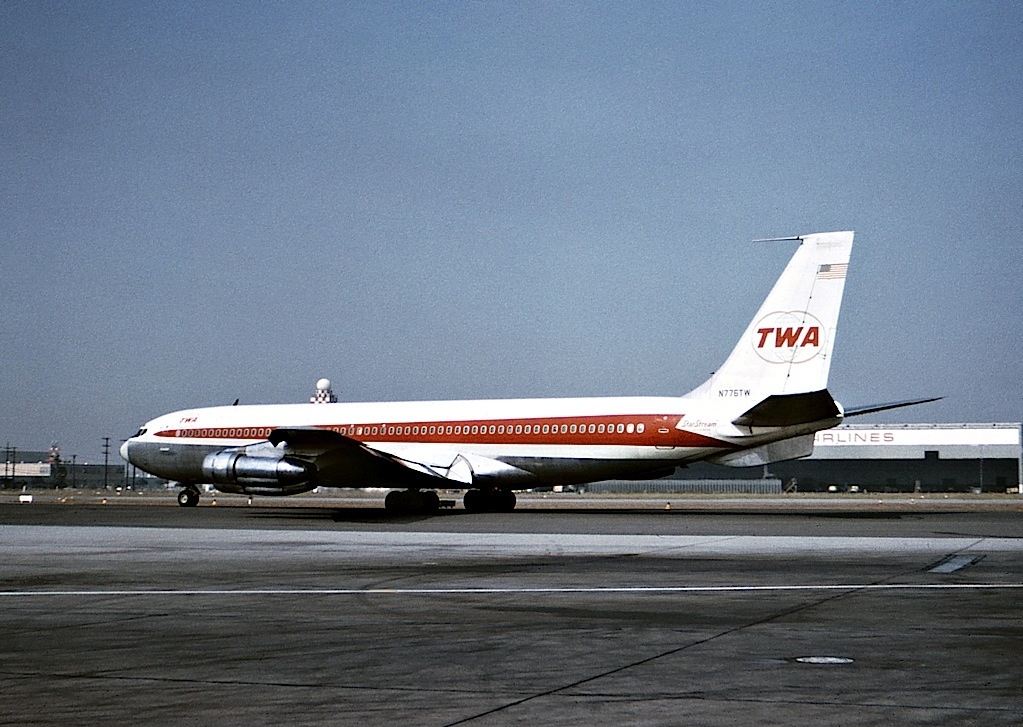
- N776TW, the aircraft involved in the Hijacking, seen at Los Angeles in 1964
- Aircraft type: Boeing 707-331B
- Operator: Trans World Airlines
- Registration: N776TW
- Flight origin: Leonardo da Vinci International Airport
- Stopover: Athens (Ellinikon) International Airport
- Destination: Ben Gurion International Airport
- Occupants: 127
- Passengers: 120
- Crew: 7
- Fatalities: 0
- Injuries: 2 (serious)
- Survivors: 127

TWA Flight 840 was a Trans World Airlines Boeing 707 operating a flight from Leonardo da Vinci International Airport in Rome, Italy, to Ben Gurion International Airport in Tel Aviv, Israel, that was hijacked on 29 August 1969. There were no fatalities although at least two passengers were lightly wounded and the aircraft was significantly damaged. Two hostages were held for two months.

== Hijacking ==
In August 1969, leaders in the Palestinian left-wing organization Popular Front for the Liberation of Palestine (PFLP) learned that Yitzhak Rabin, then Israeli ambassador to the United States, was scheduled to be aboard a Trans World Airlines (TWA) Rome–Athens–Tel Aviv flight. On 29 August two operatives, Leila Khaled and Salim Issawi, hijacked the aircraft. Rabin was not aboard, but American diplomat Thomas D. Boyatt was. The hijackers made the pilots land the aircraft at Damascus International Airport in Syria. They evacuated the aircraft, a Boeing 707, and blew up the nose section of the aircraft.

At the terminal, Khaled delivered a speech to the passengers, further explaining the motives of the hijacking. She said, "I assumed [Shadia Abu Ghazaleh's] name on flight 840 to tell the world about the crimes the Israelis inflict upon our people and to demonstrate to you that they make no distinctions between men, women and children. But for their own propaganda objectives they repeatedly state in your press how we attack their 'innocent' women and children and how cruel we are. I want you to know that we love children, too, and we certainly do not aim our guns at them. We diverted flight 840 because TWA is one of the largest American airlines that services the Israeli air routes and, more importantly, because it is an American plane. The American government is Israel's staunchest supporter. It supplies Israel with weapons for our destruction. It gives the Zionists tax-free American dollars. It supports Israel at world conferences. It helps them in every possible way. We are against America because she is an imperialist country."

The Syrian authorities arrested the hijackers and immediately released the 12 crew members and 95 passengers, retaining at first six Israeli passengers. Of those, four were released on 3 September. The remaining two Israeli passengers were released in December in return for 71 Syrian and Egyptian soldiers released by Israel. The two Palestinian hijackers had been released without charges in mid-October.

The aircraft sustained $4 million in damage. Boeing repaired the aircraft, fitting the nose section diverted from the production line at Renton and outfitted to the aircraft's specifications. The aircraft was re-registered N28714 and returned to service. In March 1980, the aircraft was withdrawn from service and flown to Davis–Monthan Air Force Base for use as spares for the KC-135 Stratotanker fleet of the United States Air Force. The aircraft's registration was canceled in March 1984.

Thomas Boyatt has received many medals and awards for his bravery and heroism during the hijacking, including a Meritorious Honor Award.

== See also ==
- List of accidents and incidents involving commercial aircraft
