= Elbert G. Mathews =

American diplomat

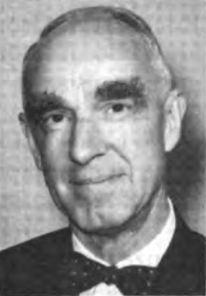

United States Ambassador to Nigeria
- In office March 10, 1964 – July 26, 1969
- President: Lyndon B. Johnson
- Preceded by: Joseph Palmer II
- Succeeded by: William Trueheart

United States Ambassador to Liberia
- In office August 12, 1959 – May 4, 1962
- President: Dwight D. Eisenhower; John F. Kennedy
- Preceded by: Richard Lee Jones
- Succeeded by: Charles Edward Rhetts

Personal details
- Born: November 24, 1910 Troy, New York, U.S.
- Died: October 31, 1977 (aged 66) Washington, D.C., U.S.
- Resting place: Rock Creek Cemetery; Washington, D.C., U.S.
- Spouse: Naomi Pearl Meffert (m. 1934)

Elbert George Mathews (November 24, 1910 – October 31, 1977) was an American diplomat.

== Early life ==
Mathews was born on November 24, 1910, in Troy, New York to parents Samuel Blumenthal and Anna Margare Mathews.

== Diplomatic career ==
Mathews was the United States Vice Consul to Vancouver from 1935 to 1936. He held the same position in Sydney from 1937 to 1940 and Kabul from 1943 to 1946. Mathews was the United States Consul to Calcutta from 1946 to 1947 and the United States Consul General in Istanbul from 1951 to 1952. Mathews was appointed by President Dwight D. Eisenhower to the position of United States Ambassador to Liberia on August 12, 1959. The presentation of his credentials occurred on September 30, 1959. He remained in this position until May 4, 1962. Mathews was appointed by President Lyndon B. Johnson to the position of United States Ambassador to Nigeria on March 10, 1964. The presentation of his credentials occurred on April 11, 1964. He remained in this position until July 26, 1969.

== Personal life ==
Mathews married Naomi Pearl Meffert on August 20, 1934. Mathews at some point resided in California.

== Death ==
Mathews died on October 31, 1977, in Washington, D.C.
