= David D. Newsom =

American diplomat (1918–2008)

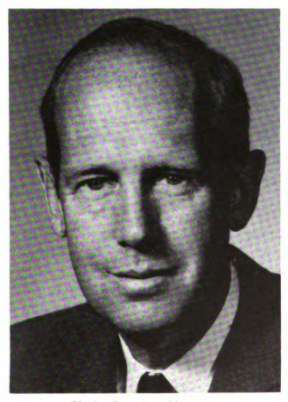

10th Under Secretary of State for Political Affairs
- In office April 19, 1978 – February 27, 1981
- President: Jimmy Carter; Ronald Reagan
- Preceded by: Philip C. Habib
- Succeeded by: Walter J. Stoessel, Jr.

United States Ambassador to the Philippines
- In office November 11, 1977 – March 30, 1978
- President: Jimmy Carter
- Preceded by: William H. Sullivan
- Succeeded by: Richard W. Murphy

United States Ambassador to Indonesia
- In office December 19, 1973 – October 6, 1977
- President: Richard Nixon; Gerald Ford; Jimmy Carter
- Preceded by: Francis Joseph Galbraith
- Succeeded by: Edward E. Masters

United States Ambassador to Libya
- In office July 22, 1965 – June 21, 1969
- President: Lyndon B. Johnson; Richard Nixon
- Preceded by: Edwin Allan Lightner
- Succeeded by: Joseph Palmer II

4th Assistant Secretary of State for African Affairs
- In office July 17, 1969 – January 13, 1974
- Preceded by: Joseph Palmer II
- Succeeded by: Donald B. Easum

Personal details
- Born: David Dunlop Newsom; January 6, 1918 Richmond, California, U.S.
- Died: March 30, 2008 (aged 90) Charlottesville, Virginia, U.S.

David Dunlop Newsom (January 6, 1918 – March 30, 2008) was an American diplomat. Newsom served as the United States Ambassador to Libya from 1965 to 1969, the United States Assistant Secretary of State for African Affairs from 1969 to 1974, the United States Ambassador to Indonesia from 1973 to 1977 and the United States Ambassador to the Philippines from 1977 to 1978.

In October 1979, when Mohammad Reza Pahlavi checked into the New York Hospital-Cornell Medical Center, he used "David D. Newsom" as his temporary codename without Newsom's knowledge.

Newsom served as Acting Secretary of State in May 1980, and held the same position in January 1981.

Newsom was also the author of six books and a regular columnist for The Christian Science Monitor, contributing over 400 columns from 1981 to 2005. On June 16, 2004, he joined a group of twenty-seven called Diplomats and Military Commanders for Change opposing the Iraq War.

Diplomatic posts
Preceded by William H. Sullivan	United States Ambassador to the Philippines; 1977–1978	Succeeded by Richard W. Murphy
Preceded by Francis Joseph Galbraith	United States Ambassador to Indonesia; 1973–1977	Succeeded by Edward E. Masters
Preceded by Edwin Allan Lightner	United States Ambassador to Libya; 1965–1969	Succeeded by Joseph Palmer II
