= John L. Tappin =

American diplomat

John L. Tappin (January 22, 1906 - December 24, 1964) was the United States Ambassador to Libya from 1954 to 1958. He was the first Ambassador after the legation was raised to Embassy status.

== Biography ==
Tappin attended St Mark's School and graduated from Princeton College in 1928. He died of a heart attack while vacationing in Aspen, Colorado.

== Career ==
Tappin became assistant to the Under Secretary of Commerce in 1947. He was involved in the formation of the Economic Cooperation Administration from 1948 to 1952. Tappin was a special assistant to the Under Secretary of State for Administration. He retired after resigning his post as Ambassador to Libya in 1958.
