= List of ambassadors of the United States to Nigeria =

Ambassador of the United States to Nigeria
- Seal of the United States Department of State

- Flag of a United States ambassador

- Incumbent; Keith Heffern; Chargé d'affaires since January 16, 2026
- Nominator: The president of the United States
- Appointer: The president; with Senate advice and consent
- Inaugural holder: Joseph Palmer II as Ambassador Extraordinary and Plenipotentiary
- Formation: September 23, 1960
- Website: U.S. Embassy - Abuja

The following is a list of United States ambassadors to Nigeria.

== Ambassadors ==
Name	Title	Appointed	Presented credentials	Terminated mission	Notes
Joseph Palmer II - Career FSO	Ambassador Extraordinary and Plenipotentiary	September 23, 1960	October 4, 1960	January 16, 1964	The Embassy in Lagos was established October 1, 1960. Reaccredited when Nigeria became a republic; presented new credentials December 12, 1963.
Elbert G. Mathews - Career FSO	Ambassador Extraordinary and Plenipotentiary	March 10, 1964	April 11, 1964	July 26, 1969	
William Trueheart - Career FSO	Ambassador Extraordinary and Plenipotentiary	September 19, 1969	November 6, 1969	September 1, 1971	
John Reinhardt - Career FSO	Ambassador Extraordinary and Plenipotentiary	September 30, 1971	December 3, 1971	February 23, 1975	
Donald B. Easum - Career FSO	Ambassador Extraordinary and Plenipotentiary	March 26, 1975	May 22, 1975	October 15, 1979	
Stephen Low - Career FSO	Ambassador Extraordinary and Plenipotentiary	September 20, 1979	November 29, 1979	July 4, 1981	
Thomas R. Pickering - Career FSO	Ambassador Extraordinary and Plenipotentiary	October 26, 1981	November 30, 1981	July 9, 1983	
Thomas W. M. Smith - Career FSO	Ambassador Extraordinary and Plenipotentiary	February 10, 1984	March 15, 1984	May 5, 1986	
Princeton Lyman - Career FSO	Ambassador Extraordinary and Plenipotentiary	September 12, 1986	October 10, 1986	July 24, 1989	
Lannon Walker - Career FSO	Ambassador Extraordinary and Plenipotentiary	October 10, 1989	November 17, 1989	July 10, 1992	
William L. Swing - Career FSO	Ambassador Extraordinary and Plenipotentiary	June 15, 1992	September 24, 1992	September 22, 1993	
Walter Carrington - Political appointee	Ambassador Extraordinary and Plenipotentiary	August 10, 1993	November 9, 1993	October 7, 1997	
William H. Twaddell - Career FSO	Ambassador Extraordinary and Plenipotentiary	November 10, 1997	December 19, 1997	August 3, 2000	The U.S. Embassy was transferred from Lagos to Abuja September 15, 2000.
Howard Franklin Jeter - Career FSO	Ambassador Extraordinary and Plenipotentiary	December 28, 2000	March 3, 2001	July 30, 2003	
John Campbell - Career FSO	Ambassador Extraordinary and Plenipotentiary	May 12, 2004	June 25, 2004	July 19, 2007	
Robin R. Sanders - Career FSO	Ambassador Extraordinary and Plenipotentiary	October 29, 2007	December 3, 2007	August 27, 2010	
Terence P. McCulley - Career FSO	Ambassador Extraordinary and Plenipotentiary	August 9, 2010	November 2, 2010	August 29, 2013	
James F. Entwistle - Career FSO	Ambassador Extraordinary and Plenipotentiary	August 22, 2013	November 26, 2013	July 21, 2016	Sworn in October 28, 2013
W. Stuart Symington - Career FSO	Ambassador Extraordinary and Plenipotentiary	October 3, 2016	December 1, 2016	August 30, 2019	Sworn in October 31, 2016
Mary Beth Leonard - Career FSO	Ambassador Extraordinary and Plenipotentiary	September 11, 2019	December 24, 2019	March 31, 2023	Sworn in October 4, 2019
David Greene - Career FSO	Chargé d'Affaires ad interim	March 31, 2023		June 22, 2024	
Richard Merrill Mills Jr. - Career FSO	Ambassador Extraordinary and Plenipotentiary	May 2, 2024	July 25, 2024	January 16, 2026	
Keith Heffern - Career FSO	Chargé d'Affaires ad interim	January 16, 2026		Present	

== See also ==
- Nigeria – United States relations
- Foreign relations of Nigeria
- Ambassadors of the United States
