= George Bernard Noble =

American scholar

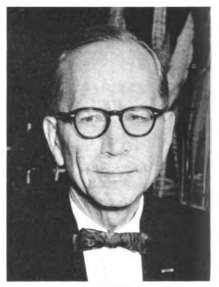

7th Department of State Historian
- In office 1946–1962
- President: Harry S. Truman; Dwight D. Eisenhower; John F. Kennedy
- Preceded by: E. Wilder Spaulding
- Succeeded by: William Franklin

Personal details
- Education: Oxford University, Columbia University

George Bernard Noble (July 11, 1892 – November 29, 1972) was an American scholar.

Noble was born in Leesburg, Florida on July 11, 1892. He was educated at the University of Washington and the University of Oxford, where he was a Rhodes scholar. He received his PhD from Columbia University after graduating from Oxford, and was awarded an LL.D. from Reed College in June of 1962. He was awarded the Distinguished Service Cross for his service in World War I, where he served as a first lieutenant in the Army.

At the Paris Peace Conference that drafted the Treaty of Versailles in 1919, Noble was attached to the American Peace Commission with the responsibility of tracking the French press' daily reactions to the deliberations of the Conference. In 1935 Macmillan published Noble's findings as Policies and Opinions at Paris, 1919.

Noble taught at many universities as a professor of American Government, American Diplomacy, and International Relations. These universities include the University of Nebraska, Barnard College, the University of Oregon, Catholic University of America, and Reed College. He taught the longest at Reed College, where he stayed from 1922 to 1948. During 1941–1942 he was a member of the Oregon State Senate and served as chairman of the War Labor Board during World War II.

From 1946 until 1962 he was director of the Department of State Historical Office, where he oversaw the publication of 80 volumes in the Foreign Relations of the United States series. He was the Historian of the Department of State for sixteen years, during which he advised six Secretaries of State. He also wrote a biography of Christian Herter, which was published in 1970.

Noble was a member of the American Political Science Association, the American Historical Association and Phi Beta Kappa.

== See also ==
- Collection: George Bernard Noble papers | Reed College Special Collections and Archiveshttps://archivesspace.reed.edu/repositories/2/archival_objects/10433
