= William C. Trueheart =

American diplomat (1918–1992)

United States Ambassador to Nigeria
- In office November 6, 1969 – September 1, 1971
- President: Richard Nixon
- Preceded by: Elbert G. Mathews
- Succeeded by: John Reinhardt

Personal details
- Born: December 18, 1918 Chester, Virginia, U.S.
- Died: December 24, 1992 (aged 74) Washington, D.C., U.S.
- Education: University of Virginia

William Clyde Trueheart (December 18, 1918 – December 24, 1992) was a diplomat who served as the U.S. ambassador to Nigeria from 1969–1971, and as the acting U.S. Ambassador and chargé d'affaires in South Vietnam from May–July 1963.

== Early life and education ==
Born on December 18, 1918, in Chester, Virginia, Trueheart earned a bachelor's degree (1939) and a master's degree in philosophy (1941) from the University of Virginia.

== Career ==
Trueheart was a civilian intelligence analyst in the United States Department of the Navy 1942–43. He then served in the Army, rising to the rank of captain. In 1949 he joined the United States Department of State as an intelligence officer. Having joined the Foreign Service, Trueheart was posted to Paris in 1954 as deputy director for political affairs at the U.S. delegation to NATO in Paris. In 1958 he moved to Ankara, Turkey, to become executive assistant to the Secretary General of the Baghdad Pact. The following year he became first secretary of the U.S. Embassy in London, specializing in atomic energy affairs.

In Saigon as of October 1961, Trueheart served as deputy chief of mission, the second-ranking U.S. diplomat in South Vietnam during what would become the final years of President Ngô Đình Diệm's rule, and during the initial buildup of U.S. military assistance to the Diem regime in its struggle against the Viet Cong. During the spring and summer of 1963, as the Buddhist crisis intensified, Trueheart's analysis of the political and military situation diverged from that of the ambassador, Frederick Nolting. As the ambassador vacationed, Trueheart warned of the possible liability to the United States of continuing to support Diem's government in South Vietnam, noted as "let[ting] loose the floodgates of doubt".

Trueheart's position as the deputy chief of mission for the United States led to his involvement in the political turmoil which South Vietnam had had to embrace after the forced coup d'état of Emperor Bảo Đại in 1955. He did not assume responsibility for the embassy until May 1963, when Nolting was on a resting period from the position. Diem's assassination later in November 1963, just before that of the President John F. Kennedy, was neither anticipated nor welcomed by Trueheart, although he had foreknowledge of the coup, and admitted there were no better alternatives within the Vietnamese theatre, indicating that it was possible that "half [the peasants] don't know who Diem is." However, this was immediately contradicted by his superior, Nolting stating emphatically that [Diem's] picture was "everywhere."

=== Historical context ===
In October 1955, following a fraudulent referendum in which Diem had secured 98.2% of the vote, the Republic of Vietnam was established (known generally as South Vietnam) in which Diem declared himself President. Stemming from this impossibility, Trueheart was shown to have little or no faith in the autocracy of the Diem government in South Vietnam, noted variously to have been part of a "get Diem faction," and rebuking Diem with the fact that he would lose American support if the oppression of the Buddhist monks continued. At this stage, during the mid-1960s, the media had become an integral part of the reporting of news in the Vietnam War, with most infractions and incidents highlighted in national news. Polarisation between Diem and the Buddhists grew worse on June 11, 1963, when Thích Quảng Đức set himself alight in the process of self-immolation.

== Notes ==
=== Bibliography ===
- Halberstam, David (1969). The Best and the Brightest. ISBN 0-449-90870-4.
- Karnow, Stanley (1997). Vietnam: A History. Penguin Books. ISBN 0-670-84218-4.
- Trueheart, Charles (2024). Diplomats at War: Friendship and Betrayal on the Brink of the Vietnam Conflict. University of Virginia Press. ISBN 0813951283.
- Jacobs, Seth (2006). Cold War Mandarin: Ngo Dinh Diem and the Origins of America's War in Vietnam, 1950–1963. Rowman & Littlefield. ISBN 0-7425-4447-8.
- "The Charleston Gazette's Editorial Response to the Vietnam War, 1963–1965". The Charleston Gazette. 1992.
- Olsen, Gregory (1995). Mansfield and Vietnam: A Study in Rhetorical Adaptation. MSU Press. ISBN 0-87013-386-1.
