= Edward P. Brynn =

American diplomat (born 1942)

Edward Paul Brynn (August 1, 1942 Pittsburgh, Pennsylvania) is a career diplomat, historian and educator. He was the American ambassador extraordinary and plenipotentiary to Burkina Faso from 1990 to 1993 and to Ghana from 1995 until 1998.

== Biography ==
The son of son of Walter and Mary C. Brynn, he grew up in West Springfield, Massachusetts and Montpelier, Vermont, Brynn graduated from Georgetown University’s School of Foreign Service in 1964. He continued his education by getting degrees in British History from Stanford University (M.A. 1965 and Ph.D. 1968) and Trinity College Dublin in Irish Politics (M. Litt. 1968 and Ph. D. 1975). Brynn served in the Air Force, retiring as a Lt. Colonel in 1992. His active duty time include what has been described as “a brief tour in Vietnam (1968-1972)” followed by eighteen years in the active reserve.

On April 17, 1967, he married Jane Ursula Cooke in Garden City, New York.
