= Frederick Clapp =

Frederick Clapp may refer to:

- Frederick Mortimer Clapp (1879–1969), curator, poet and art historian
- Frederick Gardner Clapp (1879–1944), American petroleum geologist
