= Oscar A. Swenson =

American politician

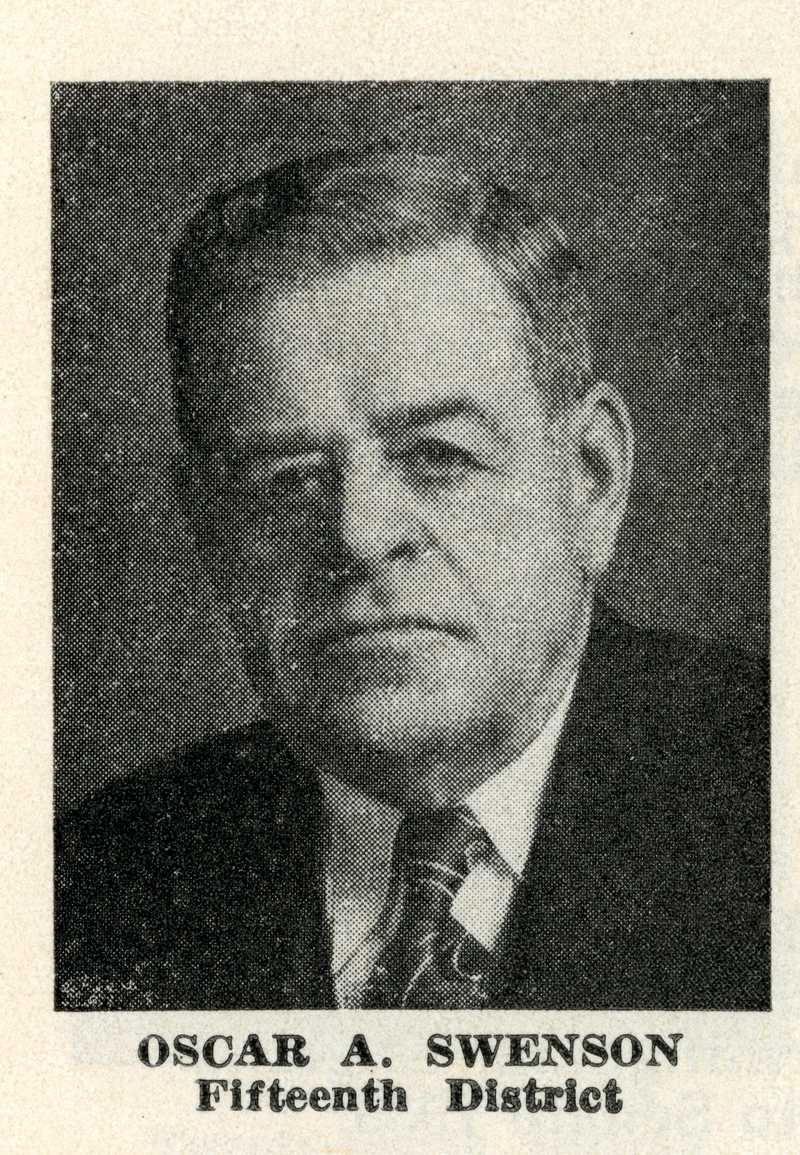

36th Speaker of the Minnesota House of Representatives
- In office January 1931 – January 1933
- Preceded by: John A. Johnson
- Succeeded by: Charles Munn

Minnesota State Representative
- In office January 1913 – January 1933

Minnesota State Senator
- In office January 1937 – January 1951

Personal details
- Born: March 27, 1877 New Sweden Township, Minnesota, U.S.
- Died: June 20, 1951 (aged 74) St. Paul, Minnesota, U.S.
- Party: Nonpartisan Conservative Caucus; Republican
- Spouse: Bertha Jenson
- Children: Maurice, Bernhard, Constance, Clara, and Eda
- Education: Gustavus Adolphus College
- Profession: Farmer

Oscar A. Swenson (March 27, 1877 – June 20, 1951) was an American politician and a Speaker of the Minnesota House of Representatives. He served two decades in the Minnesota House of Representatives, and another 14 years in the Minnesota Senate.

Oscar A. Swenson born in New Sweden Township, Minnesota to Norwegian immigrant parents. His father, Swen Swenson, was a Minnesota State Representative. His brother Laurits S. Swenson served as an American ambassador.

Oscar Swenson attended New Sweden Township Rural Schools, Luther Academy, Albert Lea, Minnesota and Gustavus Adolphus College Oscar Swenson was elected to the House in 1912. He caucused with the Conservative Caucus in the then-nonpartisan body, and was selected as speaker in 1931, a position he held for two years.

Swenson left the House in 1933, but returned to the legislature after being elected to the Senate in 1936. He held that seat until 1951, serving as chair of the Senate agriculture committee. Swenson died in 1951 in St. Paul, Minnesota. He was a member of the Norwegian Lutheran Church of Norseland in Nicollet County, Minnesota. His grandsons, Howard Swenson and Douglas G. Swenson both served the House of Representatives in the late 1990s.

Oscar Swenson was a member of the Norwegian Lutheran Church of Norseland, Minnesota. He died due to complications from a cerebral hemorrhage at Miller Hospital in St. Paul, Minnesota. His funeral was held at the Norwegian Lutheran Church of Norseland in Nicollet County, Minnesota. The collection consisting of papers belonging to Oscar A. Swenson are contained in Memorial Library, Southern Minnesota Historical Center at the Minnesota State University, in Mankato, Minnesota.

== See also ==
- List of United States political families (S)

Political offices
Preceded by John A. Johnson	Speaker of the Minnesota House of Representatives; 1931–1933	Succeeded by Charles Munn
