= Ulysses Grant-Smith =

American diplomat (1870–1959)

Ulysses S. Grant-Smith
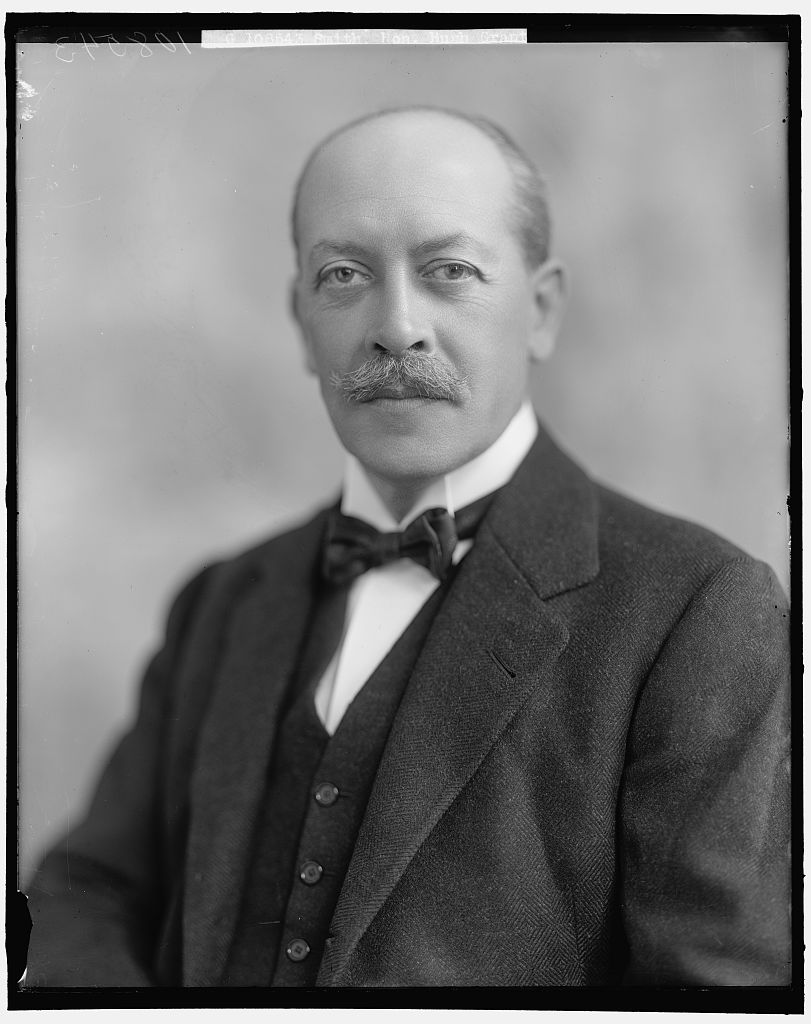

United States Minister to Uruguay
- In office July 13, 1925 – January 11, 1929
- President: Calvin Coolidge
- Preceded by: Herman Hoffman Philip
- Succeeded by: Leland B. Harrison

1st United States Minister to Albania
- In office December 4, 1922 – February 8, 1925
- President: Warren G. Harding; Calvin Coolidge
- Preceded by: Diplomatic relations established
- Succeeded by: Charles C. Hart

Personal details
- Born: November 18, 1870; Washington, Pennsylvania, U.S.
- Died: August 27, 1959 (aged 88); Washington, Pennsylvania, U.S.
- Resting place: Washington Cemetery, Pennsylvania
- Education: Washington & Jefferson College

Ulysses S. Grant-Smith (November 18, 1870 – August 27, 1959) was an American career diplomat who served as Minister to Albania and Minister to Uruguay during the interwar period.

== Biography ==
He was originally from Washington County, Pennsylvania. A career foreign service officer, he began serving as a diplomat in 1903, and arrived in Copenhagen on 18 July 1917, to take up the position of Counselor at the US Legation there. Less than five months later, upon Minister Maurice Egan's departure on 16 December, he became Chargé d'Affaires and the ranking US representative in Denmark. He remained Chargé for over a year, until the arrival of the new US Minister, Norman Hapgood, on April 16, 1919. On September 18, 1919, Grant-Smith left Copenhagen, and was declared eligible for a new diplomatic assignment. On December 4, 1919, he was appointed US Commissioner to Hungary, signing the U.S.–Hungarian Peace Treaty in 1921. In 1922, he became the first U.S. Minister to Albania. Grant-Smith was appointed to the post in September 1922 by President Warren G. Harding, and arrived in Tirana in December of the same year. He served through February 8, 1925, and was then made Minister to Uruguay from 1925 to 1929.

Ulysses Grant-Smith died on August 27, 1959, in Washington, Pennsylvania.

Diplomatic posts
First	United States Minister to Albania; 1922–1925	Succeeded by Charles C. Hart
Preceded by Hoffman Philip	United States Minister to Uruguay; 1925–1929	Succeeded by Leland Harrison
