= George W. Johnson (Minnesota politician) =

American politician

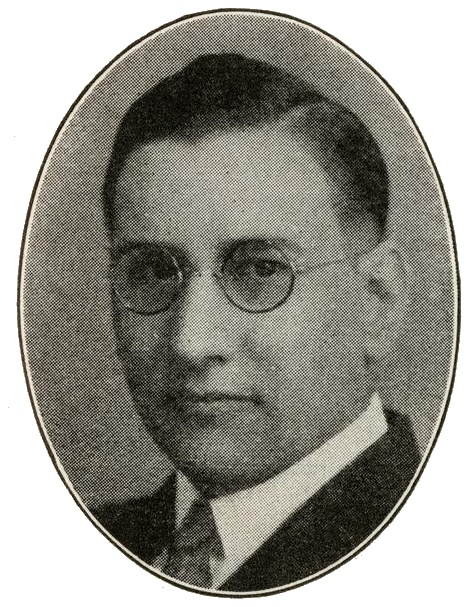
- Johnson in 1935

29th Mayor of Duluth
- In office 1945–1953
- Preceded by: Edward H. Hatch
- Succeeded by: George D. Johnson

38th Speaker of the Minnesota House of Representatives
- In office 1935–1937
- Preceded by: Charles Munn
- Succeeded by: Harold H. Barker

Minnesota State Representative
- In office 1925–1937

Personal details
- Born: December 22, 1894 Duluth, Minnesota, U.S.
- Died: June 20, 1974 (aged 79)
- Party: Republican
- Spouse: Grace

George W. Johnson (December 22, 1894 – June 20, 1974) was a Minnesota politician, the 28th Mayor of Duluth, Minnesota, and a former member and Speaker of the Minnesota House of Representatives.

A Republican, Johnson was elected to the Minnesota House of Representatives in 1924, representing the old District 59, which included portions of St. Louis County. He caucused with the Conservative Caucus in the then-nonpartisan body. In 1935, his peers elected him Speaker, a position he held for two years. Johnson was elected mayor of Duluth in 1944. He was re-elected in 1948 and served until January 1953.

== See also ==
- List of mayors of Duluth, Minnesota

Political offices
Preceded by Charles Munn	Speaker of the Minnesota House of Representatives; 1935–1937	Succeeded by Harold H. Barker
Preceded by Edward H. Hatch	Mayor of Duluth, Minnesota; 1945–1953	Succeeded by George D. Johnson
