= Herman Bernstein =

American journalist, poet, novelist, playwright, translator, Jewish activist and diplomat

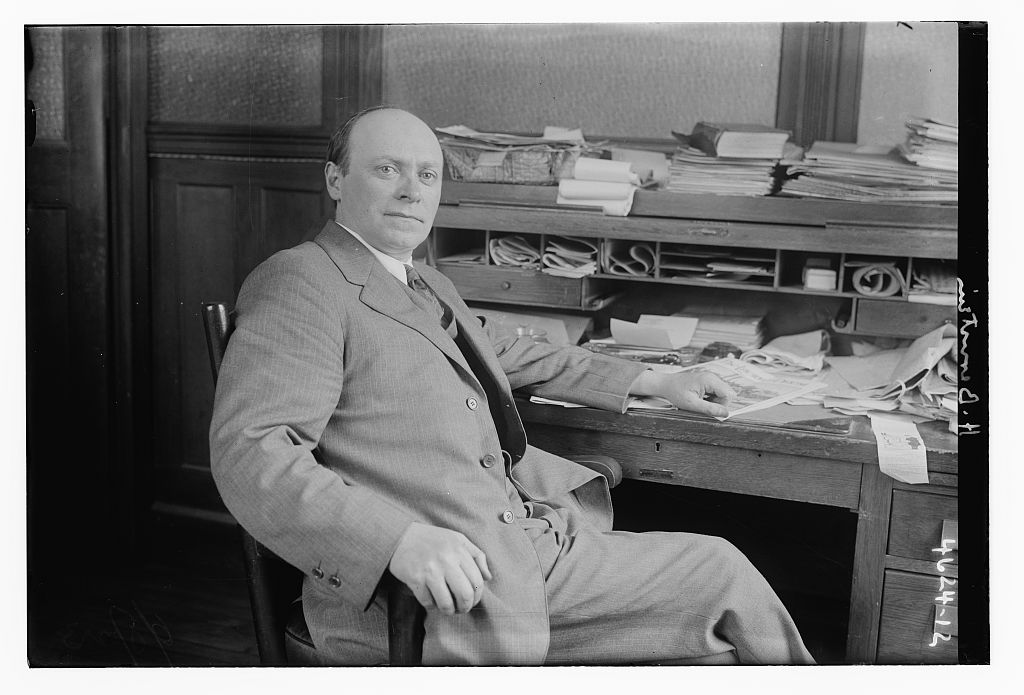
- Bernstein in 1918

3rd United States Minister to Albania
- In office April 28, 1930 – September 24, 1933
- President: Herbert Hoover
- Preceded by: Charles C. Hart
- Succeeded by: Post Wheeler

Personal details
- Born: September 21, 1876 Vladislavov, Suwałki Governorate, Russian Empire
- Died: August 31, 1935 (aged 58) Sheffield, Massachusetts, United States
- Spouse: Sophie Friedman
- Children: Violet Bernstein Willheim, Hilda Bernstein Gitlin, Dorothy Bernstein Nash (daughters), David Bernstein (son)
- Parent(s): David and Marie Bernstein
- Occupation: Journalist, writer, translator, diplomat

Herman Bernstein (Yiddish: הערמאַן בערנשטײן, September 21, 1876 – August 31, 1935) was an American journalist, poet, novelist, playwright, translator, Jewish activist, and diplomat. He was the United States Ambassador to Albania and was the founder of Der Tog, the Jewish daily newspaper.

== Biography ==
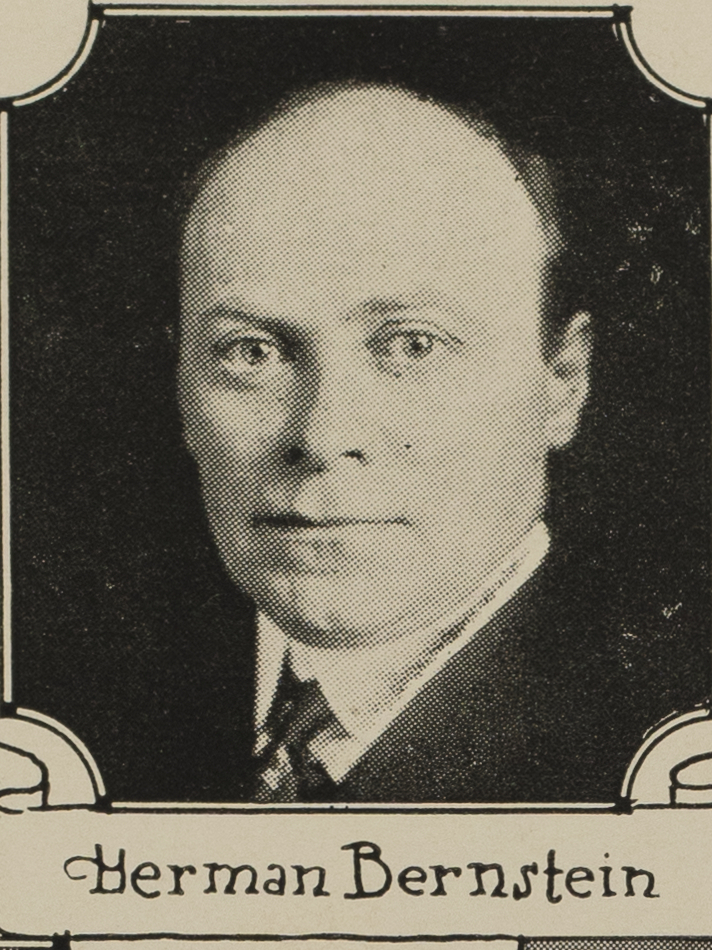
Bernstein c. 1922

Herman Bernstein was born in Vladislavov, Russian Empire (today in Lithuania). Herman's parents were David and Marie Elsohn Bernstein. His uncle was the writer and publisher Hirsch Bernstein. His brother was a writer, Hillel, or Harry Bernstein. He also had two older sisters named Helen and Flora. When he was 6 years old, his parents moved to Mohilev, on the Dnieper river in present-day Belarus.

Herman emigrated to the United States in 1893 first arriving in Chicago. His father, a Talmudic scholar, became sick with tuberculosis shortly after they arrived in the United States. This illness required Herman and his siblings to work in sweatshops to support the family. He married Sophie Friedman in 1901. They had four children together, Violet Bernstein Willheim, Hilda Bernstein Gitlin, Dorothy Bernstein Nash, and David Bernstein. who became a long-time newspaper editor in Binghamton, New York.

Bernstein covered the Russian Revolution in 1917 for the New York Herald, which led him to both Siberia and Japan with the American Expeditionary Forces. He covered the Paris Peace Conference in 1919 for the same newspaper.

Herman Bernstein died in Sheffield, Massachusetts, on August 31, 1935. He was survived by his wife Sophie, and his brother the writer Hillel Bernstein.

== Legacy ==
Descendants include Peter Nash, a physician and poet; Joyce Gitlin (Sartwell) Abell, a teacher and farmer; Crispin Sartwell, a philosophy professor and journalist; Boaz Nash, a physicist; and Joan Weber, a visual artist.

=== Journalism ===
Bernstein was prolific as a journalist throughout his life, with his first stories published in 1900. He contributed, among others, to the New York Evening Post, The Nation, The Independent, and Ainslee's Magazine. He was the founder and editor of The Day and an editor of The Jewish Tribune and of the Jewish Daily Bulletin. As a correspondent of the New York Times, Bernstein regularly travelled to Europe. In 1915, he went to Europe to document the situation of Jews in the war zones.

Victoria Woeste writes:

Bernstein, a novelist and poet of some repute, won acclaim for his accomplishments in investigative journalism in the 1910s. He was driven 'to lay bare the operations of Russian totalitarianism, whether Czarist or Bolshevist, especially in so far as it affected the fate of Russian Jews.' His reporting revealed 'the involvement of the Russian secret police in the case of Mendel Beilis, the Jew wrongfully accused of the ritual murder of a gentile boy' in 1911, and he also documented social and political conditions in Russia before and after the Communist Revolution.

Bernstein later translated Beilis's Story of My Sufferings (see translations, below). In the 1920s Bernstein wrote for the New York American and the Brooklyn Eagle, often reporting from Europe and writing frequently about Russia.

== Secret correspondence between the Kaiser and the Tsar ==
In 1918, Bernstein revealed a secret correspondence between Tsar Nicholas II and Kaiser Wilhelm II and published it in a book, The Willy-Nicky Correspondence, published by Knopf with a foreword by Theodore Roosevelt. Bernstein summarized the contents as follows:

During my recent stay in Russia I learned that shortly after the Tsar had been deposed, a series of intimate, secret telegrams were discovered in the secret archives of Nicholas Romanoff at Tsarskoye Selo. . . The complete correspondence, consisting of sixty-five telegrams exchanged between the Emperors during the years 1904, 1905, 1906 and 1907, forms an amazing picture of international diplomacy of duplicity and violence, painted by the men responsible for the greatest war in the world's history. The documents, not intended for the eyes of even the Secretaries of State of the two Emperors, constitute the most remarkable indictment of the system of governments headed by these imperial correspondents.

He remarked that "the Kaiser is exposed as a master intriguer and Mephistophelian plotter for German domination of the world. The former Tsar is revealed as a capricious weakling, a characterless, colourless nonentity." The two, Bernstein wrote, "both talked for peace and plotted against it."

In 1915, Bernstein published a book, La Rekta Gibulo, in the so-called universal language Esperanto. It is a translation of the story "The Straight Hunchback" which comes from Bernstein's In the Gates of Israel.

== Interviews ==
Bernstein interviewed many of the most eminent people of his time, including Leo Tolstoy, Bernard Shaw, Auguste Rodin, Henri Bergson, Pope Benedict XV, Peter Kropotkin, Arthur Schnitzler, Leon Trotsky, Chaim Weizmann, Havelock Ellis, Romain Rolland, Albert Einstein, and Woodrow Wilson. These interviews were gathered in several books, including With Master Minds: Interviews by Herman Bernstein and Celebrities of Our Times.

== Translations, poetry, plays, short stories ==
Bernstein translated a number of important literary works, by figures such as Maxim Gorky, Leonid Andreyev, Leo Tolstoy, and Ivan Turgenev, from Russian to English. His own plays The Mandarin and The Right to Kill, were presented on Broadway. In addition, he published poems (including those collected in The Flight of Time and Other Poems [1899]), short stories (including those collected in In the Gates of Israel: Stories of the Jews [1902]), and a novel (Contrite Hearts, 1903).

== Politics and diplomacy ==
In the early 1910s, Bernstein advocated liberal immigration policies and was a member of the Democratic National Committee, working to elect Woodrow Wilson in 1912.

Bernstein met Herbert Hoover at the Paris Peace Conference and supported his bid for the presidency in 1928. Soon thereafter, Bernstein published Herbert Hoover: The Man Who Brought America to The World. In 1930 Hoover appointed Bernstein as the United States minister to Albania, a position he held until 1933. During this appointment, he helped put into place several treaties between the U.S. and Albania, and received an award from King Zog for his service to Albania, the Grand Cordon of the Order of Skanderbeg.

== Refutation of the Protocols and lawsuit against Henry Ford ==
In 1921, responding to Henry Ford's printing of 500,000 copies of the notorious antisemitic forgery The Protocols of the Elders of Zion as well as a series of antisemitic articles under the title "The International Jew" in Ford's newspaper The Dearborn Independent, Bernstein published the book History of a Lie, a demonstration of The Protocols' spurious origins.

At the same time Ford was being lauded as an anti-Semite hero in Europe, he was confronted with another lawsuit in America. This one came from Herman Bernstein, the same man who had helped to expose The Protocols of the Learned Elders of Zion as a forgery. In the August 20, 1921, issue of the Independent, Bernstein had been identified as the source ... who revealed to Ford the supposed worldwide Jewish conspiracy. "He told me most of the things that I have printed," Ford claimed in the article, which labeled Bernstein "the messenger boy of international Jewry." An outraged Bernstein denied the allegations and, in 1923, sued Ford for $200,000. He told the press that he was doing a public service by allowing the American people to get a "true picture" of Ford's "diseased imagination."

Bernstein was represented by Samuel Untermyer. The suit languished because Bernstein and his representatives were never able to serve Ford with a subpoena; Ford had many allies among the political and law enforcement officials of Michigan and elsewhere, as well as a large private security force. Bernstein and Untermeyer did, however, succeed in getting New York state officials to agree to impound any copies of The Independent that entered the state. The extent to which this was enforced is not clear.

Other libel suits against Ford were pursued by Louis Marshall and Aaron Sapiro, though there was tension among these figures over which suit was most viable. In response to the suits, as well as the fear that the negative publicity was hurting automobile sales, Ford issued an 'Apology to Jews,' the sincerity of which is a matter of controversy. These cases are significant in the history of the jurisprudence pertaining to group libel and hate speech.

In 1935, the Nazi Party consolidated power in Germany and revived The Protocols yet again—and requiring all German schoolchildren to read it. Bernstein published another and more elaborate refutation, The Truth About the 'Protocols of Zion' – A Complete Exposure. Bernstein died later that year.

== Correspondence ==
Herman Bernstein's correspondence, housed at the YIVO Institute for Jewish Research at the Center for Jewish History in New York, includes letters to and from many of the most eminent people of that period in various walks of life, including Mark Twain, Sholem Aleichem, Andrew Carnegie, Leo Tolstoy, William Howard Taft, George Bernard Shaw, Max Nordau, Louis Brandeis, John D. Rockefeller, Louis Marshall, Israel Zangwill, Henri Bergson, Arthur Brisbane, Mordecai Kaplan, Henry Morgenthau, Sr., Gifford Pinchot, Theodore Roosevelt, Woodrow Wilson, Franz Oppenheimer, Felix Frankfurter, Warren G. Harding, William Randolph Hearst, Herbert Hoover, Constantin Stanislavski, Leon Trotsky, Arthur Balfour, Thomas Edison, Albert Einstein, Henry Ford, Arthur Goldberg, Adolph Ochs, Romain Rolland, Julius Rosenwald, Benjamin Cardozo, Yosef Yitzchok Schneersohn, and Franklin Roosevelt.

== Jewish activism ==
Bernstein worked with organizations such as ORT, the Central Relief Committee, the American Jewish Relief Committee, and the American Jewish Joint Distribution Committee to improve conditions for Jews in Europe. He also served as secretary of the American Jewish Committee, and as an officer of the Zionist Organization of America. Bernstein advocated the creation of a Jewish state in Palestine and wrote about the politics of the Middle East and the settlement of Palestine.

== Bibliography ==
Books by Herman Bernstein:

- The Flight of Time and Other Poems (1899)
- In the Gates of Israel: Stories of the Jews (short stories) (New York: Taylor, 1902)
- Contrite Hearts (novel) (New York: A. Wessels Company, 1903)
- With Master Minds: Interviews by Herman Bernstein (New York: Universal Series Publishing, 1913)
- La rekta Gibulo (book in Esperanto), (Stanyan, Presanto [Montpelier, VT], 1915)
- The Willy-Nicky Correspondence: Being the Secret and Intimate Telegrams Exchanged Between the Kaiser and the Tsar (reportage; with a foreword by Theodore Roosevelt) (New York: Knopf, 1918)
- Celebrities of Our Time (interviews) (New York: Joseph Lawren, 1924)
- History of a Lie (New York: Ogilvie, 1921)
- Twenty-Five Years (1925)
- The Road to Peace: Interviews With Famous Americans and Europeans (New York: Frank-Maurice, 1926)
- Herbert Hoover: The Man Who Brought America to the World (Herald-Nathan Press, 1928)
- Can We Abolish War? (New York: Broadview, 1935)
- The Truth About the 'Protocols of Zion' - A Complete Exposure (New York: Covici Friede, 1935)
- The League of Men (listed by WorldCat as '1930s')

Translations:

- Leonid Andreyev, The Seven Who Were Hanged (J.G. Ogilvie, 1909)
- Leonid Andreyev, Anathema (Macmillan, 1910)
- Leonid Andreyev, The Crushed Flower and Other Stories (Knopf, 1916)
- Leonid Andreyev, The Waltz of the Dogs (J.G. Little and Ives, 1922)
- Leonid Andreyev, Samson in Chains (Brentano's, 1923)
- Leonid Andreyev, Katerina (Brentano's, 1922)
- Leonid Andreyev, Satan's Diary (Boni and Liveright, 1920)
- Leonid Andreyev, The Sorrows of Belgium (Macmillan, 1922)
- Mendel Beilis, The Story of My Sufferings (1926)
- Maxim Gorky, The Man Who Was Afraid (Foma Gordayev) (Bee De Pub. Co., 1928)
- Nikolai Evreinov, The Chief Thing; a Comedy for Some, a Drama for Others (Pub. for the Theatre guild by Doubleday, Page & Co., 1926)
- Nikolai Evreinov, The Radio kiss; A Comedy of Tomorrow in Three Acts (no date)
- Fritz Gottwald, Salto mortale : A play in three acts (1929)
- Georg Kaiser, The Phantom Lover (Brentano's, 1928)
- Ludwig Thoma, Morality: a Comedy in Three Acts (1905)
- Leo Tolstoy, The Forged Coupon and Other Stories (J.S. Ogilvie, 1912)
- Lev Urvantsov, Vera, a Drama in Four Acts (1922)

Diplomatic posts
Preceded by Charles C. Hart	United States Ambassador to Albania; 1930–1933	Succeeded by Post Wheeler
