= Hoffman Philip =

American diplomat (1872–1951)

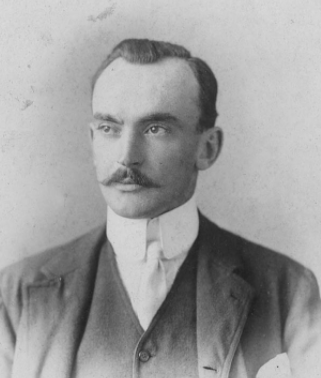

United States Ambassador to Chile
- In office November 7, 1935 – October 31, 1937
- President: Franklin D. Roosevelt
- Preceded by: Hal H. Sevier
- Succeeded by: Norman Armour

United States Ambassador to Norway
- In office November 15, 1930 – August 3, 1935
- President: Herbert Hoover; Franklin D. Roosevelt
- Preceded by: Laurits S. Swenson
- Succeeded by: Anthony Joseph Drexel Biddle Jr.

United States Ambassador to Iran
- In office January 7, 1926 – September 16, 1928
- President: Calvin Coolidge
- Preceded by: Joseph Saul Kornfeld
- Succeeded by: Charles C. Hart

United States Ambassador to Uruguay
- In office September 19, 1922 – April 10, 1925
- President: Warren G. Harding; Calvin Coolidge
- Preceded by: Robert Emmett Jeffery
- Succeeded by: Ulysses Grant-Smith

United States Ambassador to Colombia
- In office February 22, 1919 – May 29, 1922
- President: Woodrow Wilson; Warren G. Harding
- Preceded by: Thaddeus Austin Thompson
- Succeeded by: Samuel H. Piles

United States Ambassador to Ethiopia
- In office July 6, 1909 – February 8, 1910
- President: William H. Taft
- Preceded by: Office established
- Succeeded by: Addison E. Southard

Personal details
- Born: Herman Hoffman Philip; July 13, 1872 Washington, D.C., U.S.
- Died: October 31, 1951 (aged 79) Santa Barbara, California, U.S.
- Spouse: Josephine Roberts
- Parents: William Henry Philip (father); Eliza Worthington (mother)
- Education: University of Cambridge

Herman Hoffman Philip (July 13, 1872 – October 31, 1951) was an American diplomat and career foreign service officer.

== Early life ==
Herman Hoffman Philip was born on July 13, 1872, to William Henry Philip and Eliza Worthington in Washington, D.C., and later attended the University of Cambridge. During the Spanish–American War he served in the Rough Riders where he would befriend future President Theodore Roosevelt.

== Career ==
In 1902, he was appointed the United States Deputy Consul General in Tangier. From 1902 to 1905, he served as the Vice Consul in Tangier and later as Consul General in Tangier from 1905 to 1906. During his tenure as a diplomat in Morocco he participated as a negotiator in the Perdicaris affair.

On July 20, 1908, he was appointed to serve as the first Consul General to the Ethiopian Empire while the Senate was in recess. The Senate recommissioned him on December 9, 1908, and he presented his credentials on July 6, 1909, officially opening relations between the United States and Ethiopia. However, due to health problems he only served for one year. The vice consul general in Ethiopia would maintain relations until his death three years later. The British took control of relations until the consulate was formally closed as there wasn't a high enough level of commerce to justify another commercial treaty with Ethiopia. Diplomatic relations between the United States and Ethiopia would not be reestablished until Addison E. Southard was appointed in 1927.

He served as United States Ambassador to Colombia from 1917 to 1922. He served as United States Ambassador to Uruguay from 1922 to 1925. He served as United States Ambassador to Iran from 1925 to 1928. He served as United States Ambassador to Norway from 1930 to 1935. He served as United States Ambassador to Chile from 1935 to 1937.

On October 31, 1951, he died in Santa Barbara, California.

Diplomatic posts
Preceded by Office established	United States Ambassador to Ethiopia; 1909–1910	Succeeded by Addison E. Southard
Preceded by Thaddeus Austin Thompson	United States Ambassador to Colombia; 1917–1922	Succeeded by Samuel H. Piles
Preceded by Robert Emmett Jeffery	United States Ambassador to Uruguay; 1922–1925	Succeeded by Ulysses Grant-Smith
Preceded by Joseph Saul Kornfeld	United States Ambassador to Iran; 1925–1928	Succeeded by Charles C. Hart
Preceded by Laurits S. Swenson	United States Ambassador to Norway; 1930–1935	Succeeded by Anthony J. Drexel Biddle Jr.
Preceded by Hal H. Sevier	United States Ambassador to Chile; 1935–1937	Succeeded by Norman Armour
