= Swen Swenson (politician) =

Norwegian-American politician (1836–1905)

Member of the Minnesota House of Representatives from the 17th district
- In office January 4, 1887 – January 7, 1889
- Preceded by: John Webster
- Succeeded by: C. R. Davis

Personal details
- Born: c. 1835 or 1836 (Note: According to the Minnesota Legislative Reference Library, Swenson was born in 1836. An obituary published in the Albert Lea Tribune reported his age as 70 at the time of his death in 1905, indicating a birth year of circa 1835.) Norway
- Died: March 4, 1905 (aged 68–70) New Sweden, Minnesota, U.S.
- Party: Republican
- Spouse: Kristie Baekkestad
- Children: 9, including Carl, Oscar, and Laurits
- Relatives: Lars Swenson (brother); Doug Swenson (great-grandson); Howard Swenson (great-grandson)

Swen Swenson (c. 1835 or 1836 – March 4, 1905) was a Norwegian-born American farmer and politician. He emigrated with his family to the United States in 1857, settling in Nicollet County, Minnesota. He served in numerous public offices, including as town clerk of New Sweden, Minnesota, clerk of its first school district, chairman of its town board, and chairman of the Nicollet County board of commissioners. He served in the Minnesota House of Representatives from 1887 to 1889, representing its 17th district. Swenson died on March 4, 1905, at his home in New Sweden.

== Life and career ==
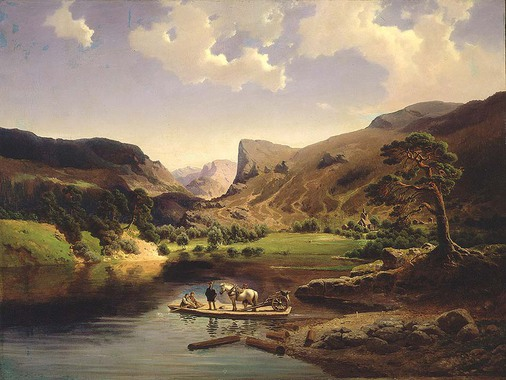
1849 painting of Hallingdal, Swenson's native region, by Joachim Frich.

Swenson was born in Norway in the mid-1830s. With his family, in 1857, he began immigrating to the United States. Beginning in Hallingdal, they traveled by wagon to Drammen, then going to Quebec using a small sailing vessel. After arriving in Quebec, through various boats and trains, they then arrived at Red Wing, Minnesota, on July 4, 1857. Upon their entry into Minnesota, Swenson moved his family to Nicollet County alongside his uncle Gamle Lars. The family then bought land in what would become New Sweden Township. Swenson—at the age of 21—obtained a farm, also in New Sweden.

Swenson married Hallingdal native Kristie Baekkestad. Together, they had nine children: Juliane, Christine, Laurits, Albert, Nels, Carl, Swen Gerhard, Oscar, and Soren. Swenson's original farm was passed down to Oscar and Swen Gerhard. In the midst of the Dakota War of 1862, Swenson's family were forced out of their home by Native Americans.

Throughout his lifetime, Swenson served in numerous public offices, including president of both the first and first co-operative creamery in Nicollet County, clerk of the first school district organized in New Sweden, chairman of the New Sweden town board, and New Sweden town clerk. In the 1870s, he was chairman of the Nicollet County board of commissioners. Swenson was considered a pioneer in advocating for the adoption of a drainage system in Nicollet County.

In August 1886, Swenson was nominated to run for county treasurer of Nicollet County under a farmers' ticket. Later that year in September, Swenson was nominated to serve in the Minnesota House of Representatives as a member of the Republican Party. He was elected—alongside Lars Swenson, his brother, who became a member of the Minnesota Senate for the 29th district—and served from January 4, 1887, to January 7, 1889. During his representative career, Swenson was assigned to the Public Buildings and Hospital for Insane committees.

On March 4, 1905, Swenson died from apoplexy at his home in New Sweden.
