= Thomas J. O'Brien (Michigan politician) =

American diplomat

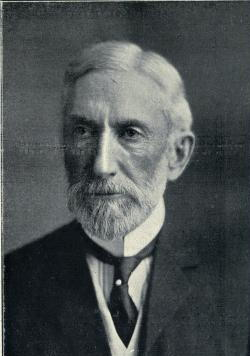
- The Honorable Thomas J. O'Brien, U.S. Ambassador to Japan, in 1910.

United States Ambassador to Italy
- In office November 13, 1911 – September 17, 1913
- President: William Howard Taft
- Preceded by: John G. A. Leishman
- Succeeded by: Thomas Nelson Page

United States Ambassador to Japan
- In office October 15, 1907 – August 31, 1911
- President: Theodore Roosevelt; William Howard Taft
- Preceded by: Luke E. Wright
- Succeeded by: Charles Page Bryan

United States Minister to Denmark
- In office May 27, 1905 – June 5, 1907
- President: Theodore Roosevelt
- Preceded by: Laurits S. Swenson
- Succeeded by: Maurice Francis Egan

Personal details
- Born: Thomas J. O'Brien; 30 July 1842 Jackson, Michigan, U.S.
- Died: 19 May 1933 (aged 90)
- Party: Republican
- Spouse: Delia Howard O'Brien (1848–1926)
- Children: 2
- Education: University of Michigan
- Profession: Politician, diplomat

Thomas James O’Brien (July 30, 1842 – May 19, 1933) was a politician and diplomat from the U.S. state of Michigan. While serving as Ambassador to Japan, he, along with Japanese Minister for Foreign Affairs Hayashi Tadasu, negotiated the Gentlemen's Agreement of 1907 that addressed the issue of Japanese immigration to the United States and allowed children of Japanese immigrants to attend public schools in California.

== Life ==
O'Brien was born in Jackson, Michigan, on July 30, 1842, the son of Timothy O'Brien and Elizabeth Lander O'Brien. On September 4, 1873, he married Delia Howard (July 14, 1848 - January 22, 1926).

O'Brien was a lawyer by profession and a Republican politician. In 1883 he was an unsuccessful candidate for the office of Justice of the Michigan Supreme Court. In 1896 and 1904 he was a delegate to the Republican National Convention from Michigan.

== Ambassador ==
O’Brien, a graduate of the University of Michigan law school, held the following posts as ambassador of the United States:

- Denmark, 1905–1907 (appointed by President Theodore Roosevelt)
- Japan, 1907–1911 (appointed by President Theodore Roosevelt)
- Italy, 1911–1913 (appointed by President William Howard Taft)

== Death ==
O’Brien died on May 19, 1933. He is buried with his wife at Oakhill Cemetery in Grand Rapids, Michigan.

== Sources ==
- The Political Graveyard: Thomas O’Brien
- United States Department of State: Chiefs of Mission by Country, 1778-2005

Diplomatic posts
Preceded by Laurits S. Swenson	U.S. Minister to Denmark; 1905–1907	Succeeded by Maurice Francis Egan
Preceded by Luke E. Wright	U.S. Ambassador to Japan; 1907–1911	Succeeded by Charles Page Bryan
Preceded by John G. A. Leishman	U.S. Ambassador to Italy; 1911–1913	Succeeded by Thomas Nelson Page
