= Addison E. Southard =

American businessman

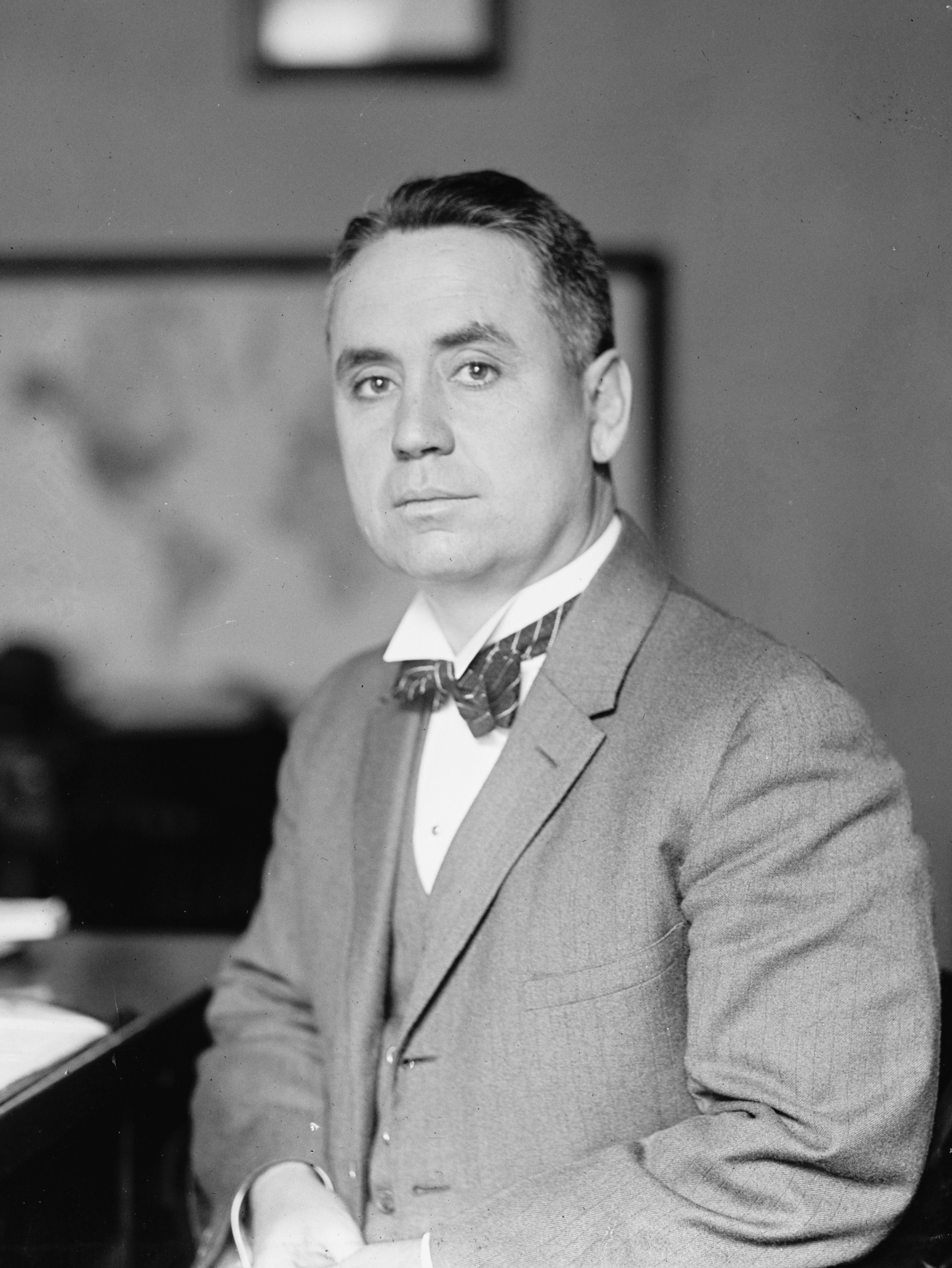

United States Consul General for Hong Kong and Macau
- In office November 5, 1937 – June 30, 1942
- Preceded by: Charles L. Hoover
- Succeeded by: Karl L. Rankin

United States Consul General for Paris
- In office 1936–1937
- Preceded by: Clarence E. Gauss

United States Ambassador to Ethiopia
- In office March 1, 1928 – October 26, 1934
- Preceded by: Hoffman Philip
- Succeeded by: Cornelius Van Hemert Engert

Personal details
- Born: October 18, 1884 Louisville, Kentucky, U.S.
- Died: February 11, 1970 (aged 85) San Francisco, California U.S.
- Spouse: Lucy Meloy
- Children: Patrick H. Southard
- Education: National Normal University; University of St. Thomas

Addison E. Southard (October 18, 1884 – February 11, 1970) was an American diplomat who served as Minister Resident and Consul General to multiple countries. After serving in administration roles in the Philippines and diplomatic roles in the Middle East and Southeast Asia Southard reestablished relations between the United States and Ethiopia. He later served as the Consul General for Hong Kong and Macau until Hong Kong fell to the Japanese.

== Early life ==
Addison E. Southard was born on October 18, 1884, in Louisville, Kentucky, and educated at National Normal University and the University of St. Thomas. He worked for a commercial firm in Oaxaca, Mexico, from 1904 to 1905, and in 1906 at a newspaper. In 1914, he married Lucy Meloy and would later have one son with her.

== Career ==
From 1907 to 1915, he worked for the Insular Government of the Philippine Islands before entering a diplomatic career and later advised President Woodrow Wilson at the Versailles Treaty Conference in 1919. In 1916, he was nominated by Wilson to be a consul and was approved by the United States Senate.

From the 1910s to the 1920s, Southard served in the United States consulates in Aden and Jerusalem before becoming the Consul General in Singapore from 1926 to 1927. From 1922 to 1926, he served in the Department of State as the chief of the consular reporting office.

In 1916, he visited Ethiopia as a part of an economic survey, and in 1920, helped negotiate oil concessions. In 1923, he participated in an economic and agricultural survey in Mandatory Palestine.

=== Ethiopia ===
In 1909, Hoffman Philip was appointed to serve as the United States' first ambassador to Ethiopia, but only remained in the position for one year due to health problems. In 1914, the consulate was formally closed as there wasn't a high enough level of commerce to justify another commercial treaty with Ethiopia. In 1917, Southard visited Ethiopia and reported that the Ethiopians were displeased that there was no longer a diplomatic mission from the United States in Addis Ababa. In 1923, Haile Selassie wrote to President Warren G. Harding asking for the consulate to be reestablished, but did not get a reply until 1925, from President Calvin Coolidge.

On October 12, 1927, Southard was appointed as the Consul General to Ethiopia while the Senate was in recess and was later recommissioned on December 19, 1927. On March 1, 1928, he presented his credentials to the Ethiopian government and would continue to serve until October 26, 1934.

In 1930, he was commissioned by National Geographic to report on the coronation of Haile Selassie as Emperor of Ethiopia and the report was released in June 1931. During his tenure a lake was discovered in the northwestern part of the country and was named "Southard Crater Lake" in his honor by Selassie and he received the Order of the Holy Trinity, an Ethiopian warrior costume, a lion skin, a lion's mane, a silver mounted lance, and other gifts from Selassie.

On January 17, 1932, he was being driven through Addis Ababa when his chauffeur ran over a woman's foot. A police officer attempted to arrest the chauffeur, but Southard protested against it while several other officers arrived and was later thrown to the ground by the officers. The officers were later arrested and sentenced to one year in prison and given heavy fines for the beating. Foreign Minister Heruy Wolde Selassie, Addis Ababa Mayor Makonnen Endelkachew, and three cabinet members apologized to Southard for the beating.

In 1934, he was appointed to serve as the Consul General in Stockholm, Sweden. In 1936, he was appointed to serve as the Consul General in Paris, France.

=== Hong Kong ===
On May 1, 1937, he was appointed as the Consul General for Hong Kong and Macau. During the Canton Operation the Japanese dropped three bombs on the American owned Lingnan University, causing criticism from the United States which was delivered by Southard. On November 30, 1938, Lydia Liliuokalani Kawānanakoa, the daughter of former Hawai'i Prince David Kawānanakoa, married journalist Clark Lee and Southard served as a witness to the wedding.

In 1941, Lauchlin Currie visited China to determine whether or not to advise President Franklin D. Roosevelt to extend the lend-Lease program to China and was greeted upon his arrival by Southard and a representative of Chiang Kai-shek. In November 1941, he was surprised by the British evacuation order for Britons in the Fujian province, due to the advancing Japanese army, as a similar warning had not been issued to Americans in the area.

During the Battle of Hong Kong his home in the city was destroyed, forcing him to live at the consulate general building. On December 25, 1941, the Japanese took Hong Kong and imprisoned him. On March 12, it was reported that Southard and his staff were in two houses in a select residential district of Hong Kong and were later moved to the Stanley district. After six months of imprisonment he was released as part of an exchange agreement alongside sixty three other diplomats and was taken to Maputo on board the Asama Maru before returning to the United States on August 25, 1942.

On June 30, 1942, Southard left his position in the Hong Kong consulate generalship. He retired from governmental service in 1943.

== Later life ==
In 1955, Emperor Haile Selassie invited him to observe the 25th anniversary of his coronation. On February 11, 1970, Southard died in San Francisco.
