= Charles C. Hart =

American diplomat

8th United States Minister to Iran
- In office February 9, 1930 – October 31, 1933
- President: Herbert Hoover; Franklin D. Roosevelt
- Preceded by: Hoffman Philip
- Succeeded by: William H. Hornibrook

2nd United States Minister to Albania
- In office August 1, 1925 – December 12, 1929
- President: Calvin Coolidge; Herbert Hoover
- Preceded by: Ulysses Grant-Smith
- Succeeded by: Herman Bernstein

Personal details
- Born: September 14, 1878 Bryant, Indiana, U.S.
- Died: November 17, 1956 (aged 78) Los Angeles, California, U.S.
- Resting place: Arlington National Cemetery
- Party: Republican
- Spouse(s): Bertha Hall Ruth Agnes Lymond (m. 1917)
- Children: 3
- Occupation: Journalist, diplomat

Military service
- Allegiance: United States
- Branch/service: United States Army
- Years of service: 1897-1898
- Rank: Private
- Unit: Third Artillery
- Battles/wars: Spanish–American War

Charles Calmer Hart (September 14, 1878 – November 17, 1956) was an American journalist and diplomat, who served as minister to Albania from 1925 to 1929, and as minister to Persia from 1930 to 1933.

== Early years ==
Born on a farm in Bryant, Indiana, in September 1878, Charles Calmer Hart was the son of a schoolteacher. His first jobs included farming and working in a factory. Though he never attended high college or university, he became a printer's devil at the Geneva Herald, in Indiana, before joining the Muncie Star, now The Star Press.

In 1897, he moved west, and joined the staff of the San Francisco Call as a reporter, before enlisting in the United States Army.

As a soldier, he served as a private in the Third Regiment of Artillery, either in Battery K, or Battery L. During his military service, Hart served as a guard on Alcatraz Island during its usage as Alcatraz Citadel, an Army prison, and was seriously injured: while climbing the steps of the lighthouse, possibly to paint the roof, the stairwell gave way under him, dropping him thirty feet into the rocks below, fracturing his leg, which required the amputation of his leg below the knee.

Though there is some dispute regarding Hart's supposed service in the Spanish–American War, (Note: The Swedish-language newspaper Vestkusten stated, in 1929, that "Han deltog i spanskamerikanska kriget", or, translated, "He [Hart] participated in the Spanish–American War"; but the Durham Morning Herald, in 1914, reported that Hart was discharged a month before the declaration of war.) it is known that Hart's injuries necessitated a year of convalescence, including some time at the Soldiers' Home. As a result of the amputation, he received a pension, and used a prosthetic foot and a cane for the rest of his life.

== Newspaperman ==
He soon returned home to Indiana, rejoining the Muncie Star, this time as an editor; he later joined The Indianapolis Star as an editor, as well; during this time, as a young reporter, he provided Gene Stratton-Porter with her first newspaper mention, on the strength of her reporting in the Decatur Journal. He next worked for other newspapers around the country, mainly in the West, including The Spokesman-Review, where he served as city editor; and The Oregonian, where he served as a Washington, D.C. correspondent. In addition, he was also a correspondent with the Boise-based Capital-News, and the Minneapolis Tribune, the latter of which is now the Star Tribune.

While in Washington, furthermore, Hart served as the secretary of the National Press Club three times.

== Politics ==
Hart was active in politics as a Republican. He supported Charles Evans Hughes during the 1916 presidential campaign, though his first candidate was Senator William Borah. Additionally, for three years, he was the secretary and campaign manager for Republican progressive William La Follette.

Hart ran for Congress in 1916, in Washington's 5th congressional district, but lost the Republican primary. In November, Clarence Dill, one of his former reporters, was re-elected.

== Personal life ==
On April 21, 1917, Hart married Ruth Agnes Limond in Seattle. The two had met in Coronado, California, during Hart's campaign for Hughes. For Hart, this was his second marriage; he had earlier married Bertha Hall, with whom he had a daughter.

With Ruth Limond, Hart had two children, a son, John; and a daughter, Priscilla.

== Albania ==
President Calvin Coolidge nominated Hart as the second minister to Albania in May 1925; he took up his post later that year.

Hart's reports during his service as minister to Albania were widely considered entertaining and funny, including by the Secretary of State, Frank B. Kellogg, and others in the Foreign Service, as they were written in a vivid and realistic style, more suited to journalism than diplomacy.

Well-liked by Albanian officials, Hart, like Albanian president Zogu, proved to be wily and careful, especially when dealing with newspaper reporters; apposite, as Hart taught Zogu how to play poker. During his time as minister, Albania became a monarchy under Zogu, now King Zog I; President Coolidge recognized the new Albanian government, as one properly created under the constitutional mechanisms of the Albanian Republic; and Zog personally dedicated the new United States Embassy in Tirana, with its large twelve rooms and lavish furnishings, which, with some modifications and renovations, remains the embassy today.

At the time, King Zog was a bachelor, and it was later reported that he reached out to Hart for the diplomat's assistance in finding a wealthy, politically courageous, and beautiful American bride, someone to help him Westernise his country, and that Hart had sent back a list of names, including Natalie Hays Hammond, whom Zog rejected due to lack of wealth. Minister Hart denied the entire account. In the end, Zog would get part of his wish: in 1938, he married Geraldine Apponyi, an impecunious Hungarian-American countess.

By then, however, Hart had left as minister; he was replaced by Herman Bernstein in 1930.

== Persia ==
After some time back in the United States, Hart was nominated by President Herbert Hoover as minister to Iran (then known as Persia) in October 1929. The United States Senate confirmed his nomination in November; and during Hart's journey to Iran, he passed through the Soviet Union, which was uncommon and made him the first American diplomat in twelve years to have done so, presumably at the behest of the State Department.

As minister to Persia, Hart was considered "energetic and popular"; as one Iranian newspaper stated, he "understands the Orient and the oriental mentality".

Hart's reports continued to be humorous, and, to the admonishment of his colleagues and State Department officials, candid; yet when a report of such nature was received by Henry L. Stimson, Kellogg's successor, replete with calls for disciplinary actions, Stimson demurred.

Hart, during his time in Iran, was able to observe and report on the beginnings of Iranian modernism, including the actions and creations of the Society for the National Heritage of Iran, and municipal modernization under Reza Shah. Though he was successful in persuading the government to allow James Henry Breasted to conduct an archaeological restoration there, most of his tenure involved responses to crises, including the 1930 Salmas earthquake and its aftermath, as well as the kidnapping of American consular officers, by Lurs near Sahneh, in 1932.

In 1933, he resigned as minister, and was replaced with William H. Hornibrook.

== Later years ==
After leaving his second diplomatic post, Hart worked in oil and gas exploration in the Middle East.

In 1936, for instance, Hart, backed by the former Secretary of the Treasury, Ogden L. Mills, and joined by Frederick Gardner Clapp, helped negotiate oil rights in Afghanistan for an American firm, at the request of the Afghan and Persian governments.

During World War II, Hart sought to open another front in Albania; his mission was canceled some time before he boarded his flight, the "Yankee Clipper", which would crash on February 22, 1943, leaving fifteen survivors, including Jane Froman.

In March 1946, Hart, as the president of the American Friends of Albania group, rebuked Senator Claude Pepper on the Senator's position on Epirus in a newspaper advertisement.

Hart's health began to fail that year; in late 1946, he stayed at Bethesda Naval Hospital for several months, after a series of operations relating to complications stemming from his Alcatraz injury.

Hart also collected documents and autographs, some of which were auctioned off in February 1947.

The next year, Charles Calmer Hart moved to California, where he died on November 17, 1956, in Los Angeles, at the age of 78.

He is buried at Arlington National Cemetery.

== See also ==
- Robert Rossow, Jr.

== Notes ==
Diplomatic posts
Preceded by Ulysses Grant-Smith	United States Minister to Albania; 1925-1929	Succeeded by Herman Bernstein
Preceded by Hoffman Philip	United States Minister to Iran; 1930–1933	Succeeded by William H. Hornibrook
