= Charles Munn (politician) =

American politician

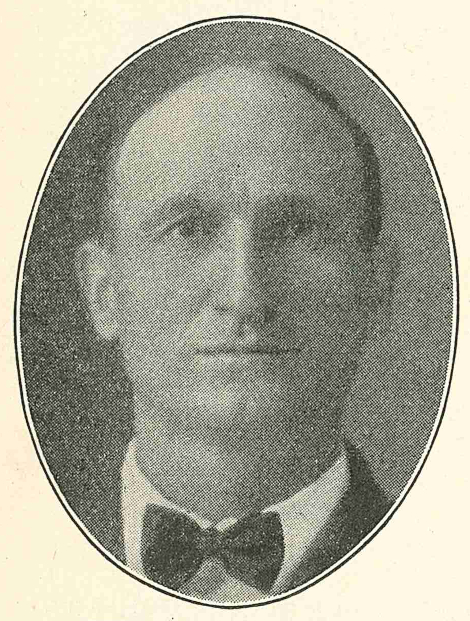
- Munn c. 1927

37th Speaker of the Minnesota House of Representatives
- In office January 1933 – January 1935
- Preceded by: Oscar A. Swenson
- Succeeded by: George W. Johnson

Member of the Minnesota House of Representatives from the 36th district
- In office January 3, 1927 – January 6, 1935

Personal details
- Born: March 17, 1887 Osseo, Minnesota, U.S.
- Died: January 31, 1973 (aged 85)
- Party: Nonpartisan Conservative Caucus; Nonpartisan Liberal Caucus; Farmer-Labor
- Profession: Farmer

Charles Munn (March 17, 1887 in Osseo, Minnesota – January 31, 1973) was a Minnesota Farmer-Laborite politician and a Speaker of the Minnesota House of Representatives. He was elected to the Minnesota House of Representatives in 1926, and originally caucused with the Conservative Caucus in the then-nonpartisan body. He later joined the Liberal Caucus, and in 1933, he became the first Farmer-Laborite to be elected speaker, a position he held for two years. In 1934, he was elected to the Railroad and Warehouse Commission.

Political offices
Preceded by Oscar A. Swenson	Speaker of the Minnesota House of Representatives; 1933–1935	Succeeded by George W. Johnson
