= Laurits S. Swenson =

American diplomat (1865–1947)

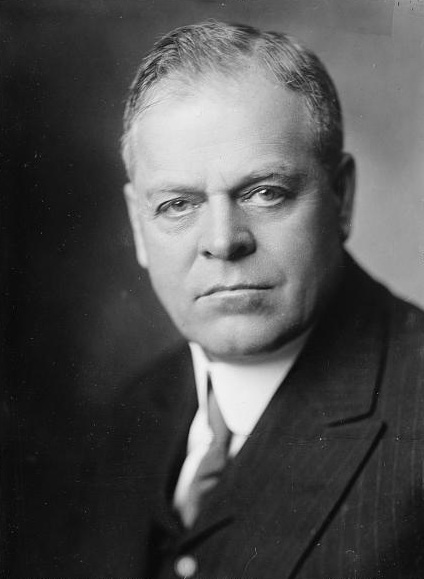

Laurits Selmer Swenson (aka Selmer) (June 12, 1865–November 4, 1947) was an American diplomat who served as Ambassador (called Minister at the time) to Norway, the Netherlands, Switzerland and Denmark.

== Background ==
Laurits Selmer Swenson was born in New Sweden, Minnesota to Norwegian immigrant parents. His father, Swen Swenson was a Minnesota State Representative. He graduated from Iowa's Luther College with bachelor's (1886) and master's (1889) degrees and became Principal of Lutheran Academy in Albert Lea, where he worked from 1888 to 1897. From 1895 to 1897 Swenson served on the University of Minnesota Board of Regents. Swenson also pursued a business career, serving as vice president of Union State Bank and president of the Wiprud Land & Colonization Company, an effort to attract European immigrants to settle in Minnesota.

== Diplomatic career ==
In 1897, Swenson started a diplomatic career when he was appointed Minister to Denmark. He served in Copenhagen until 1905. In this post, Swenson negotiated the terms for the sale of the Danish West Indies (now the U.S. Virgin Islands).

In 1909, he was appointed Minister to Switzerland, where he served until 1911.

Swenson served as Minister to Norway from 1911 to 1913. In 1921 Swenson was again appointed Minister to Norway, and he held this position until 1930. Swenson was a popular diplomat, particularly in Norway, maybe due to his Norwegian ancestry. In 1929 Time Magazine wrote: "Europeans have always marveled that the diplomatic and consular representatives of the U. S. are so often of the same strain as the people to whom they are accredited".

In 1925, Swenson received the Nobel Peace Prize in Oslo, on behalf of the US vice president Charles Gates Dawes. The prize was shared with the British secretary of state Austen Chamberlain.

In 1931, Swenson was named Ambassador to the Netherlands, where he served until 1934. He then retired and moved back to Norway where his only daughter lived.

Swenson died in Oslo on November 4, 1947.

== See also ==
- List of United States political families (S)

== External resources ==
- Laurits Selmer Swenson biography, Office of the Historian, U.S. Department of State, accessed December 13, 2012

Diplomatic posts
Preceded by John E. Risley	U.S. Minister to Denmark; 1897–1905	Succeeded by Thomas J. O'Brien
Preceded by Brutus J. Clay II	U.S. Minister to Switzerland; 1909–1911	Succeeded by Henry Sherman Boutell
Preceded by Herbert H. D. Peirce	U.S. Minister to Norway; 1911–1913	Succeeded by Albert G. Schmedeman
Preceded by Albert G. Schmedeman	U.S. Minister to Norway; 1921–1930	Succeeded by Hoffman Philip
Preceded by Gerrit J. Diekema	U.S. Minister to the Netherlands; 1931–1934	Succeeded by Grenville T. Emmet
