= Maurice F. Egan =

American diplomat

Maurice Francis Egan
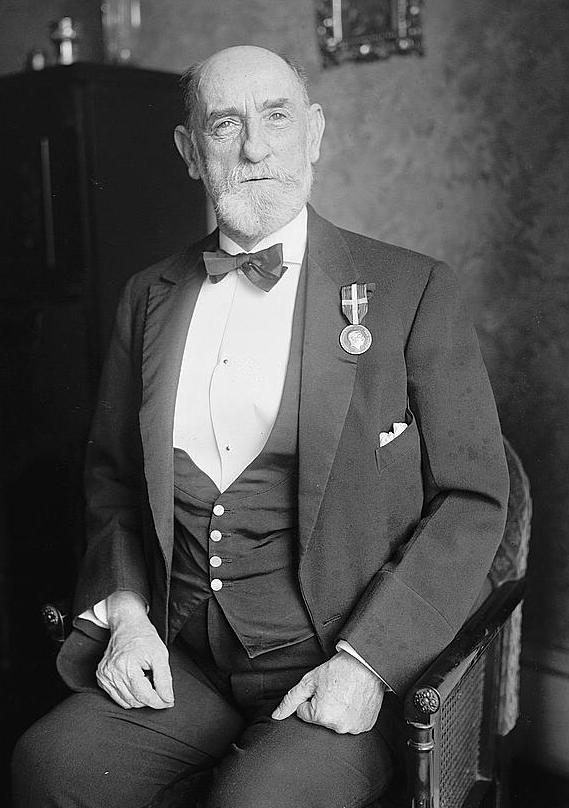
- Egan in 1923, wearing the Medal of Merit (Denmark)

United States Minister to Denmark
- In office September 6, 1907 – December 16, 1917
- President: Theodore Roosevelt; William Howard Taft; Woodrow Wilson
- Preceded by: Thomas J. O'Brien
- Succeeded by: Norman Hapgood

Personal details
- Born: May 24, 1852 Philadelphia, Pennsylvania
- Died: January 15, 1924 (aged 71) Brooklyn, New York
- Education: LaSalle College; Georgetown University
- Occupation: Writer, diplomat
- Awards: Medal of Merit; Grand Cross, Order of the Dannebrog

Maurice Francis Egan (May 24, 1852 – January 15, 1924) was an American writer and diplomat. He was a prolific writer and had a long and successful career as a Catholic journalist, literary critic, and novelist. He was a professor of English at two universities, and served as United States Minister in Copenhagen.

== Life and career ==
Egan's father was an immigrant from County Tipperary, Ireland who became a successful industrialist. His mother was from Philadelphia. Egan was born in Philadelphia in 1852. He received his secondary education from Brothers of the Christian Schools (FSC) at the newly opened LaSalle College. He did graduate work in journalism at Georgetown University, Washington, D.C.

Egan returned to Philadelphia in 1877. His father urged him to pursue a career in law, but Egan instead began to contribute to The Saturday Evening Post magazine. His first novel That Girl of Mine, an implausible romance set in Washington, D.C. society, was published in 1877. Egan wrote the novel in two weeks for a pulp romance series. It was successful, and Egan wrote a sequel titled That Lover of Mine for the same series in 1877.

Egan moved to New York in 1878. He used the network of Catholic publications to further his career, first becoming an editor at the Catholic journal Magee's Weekly. He then moved to the Illustrated Catholic American, and later to P. V. Hickey's Catholic Review. He became associate editor of the Freeman's Journal in 1881. He wrote essays, poems, reviews, and short fiction throughout the 1880s. Egan had become a respected Catholic writer by the 1890s. The 1890s was his most productive decade as a writer.

Egan was professor of English at the University of Notre Dame from 1888 to 1896. He was professor of English at The Catholic University of America, Washington D.C. from 1896 to 1907. He was an editor of the landmark ten volume Irish Literature (1904). His essay on "Irish Novels" was included in the book. He was a friend of US President Theodore Roosevelt, and introduced him to William Butler Yeats at a White House lunch.

Egan resigned his professorship and left academic life when President Roosevelt appointed him United States Ambassador to Denmark. His appointment was a reward for his services as an unofficial contact with the hierarchy of the Catholic Church about Church-State problems in the Philippines and other countries. He continued in this post under Presidents William Howard Taft and Woodrow Wilson. He facilitated the purchase of the Danish West Indies (renamed the United States Virgin Islands) in 1917. This sale was the culmination of years of efforts on the part of Egan to get the Danes to sell these islands. He resigned his position because of ill-health, and left Copenhagen for the United States on 16 December 1917.

In 1908 he was elected to the American Academy of Arts and Letters. He was awarded the University of Notre Dame's Laetare Medal, an award for an outstanding Catholic, in 1910.

His autobiography Recollections of a Happy Life was published in 1924.

He died in New York on January 15, 1924.

=== Awards and honors ===
- Laetare Medal, University of Notre Dame, 1910
- Grand Cross of the Order of the Dannebrog, 1918
- Medal of Merit, Denmark, 1923

== Works ==
Egan published poetry in Ave Maria, Sacred Heart Messenger, The Century, and The Saturday Evening Post. He published twelve novels, including The Disappearance of John Longworthy (1890), The Success of Patrick Desmond (1893), and The Vocation of Edward Conway (1896). His most popular novel was The Wiles of Sexton Maginnis (1909), which was about a shaughraun, or vagabond, who never lies "except in the interest of truth". His novels were romantic and melodramatic, mixing some realism with the romantic conventions of 19th century literature. They depicted lives of contemporary urban Catholics in the United States, showing Irish Catholics learning how to practise their religion in the United States. His novels promoted genteel middle-class values. Egan was perhaps the first Irish American author to exchange the Irish part of their background for a genteel Catholic middle class identity. This was a common trade-off among his generation of Irish Americans.

== Bibliography ==
Works by Maurice Francis Egan include:

=== Fiction ===
- That Girl of Mine (1877)
- That Lover of Mine (1877)
- The Life Around Us: a Collection of Stories (1885)
- The Success of Patrick Desmond (1893)
- A Marriage of Reason (1893)
- The Vocation of Edward Conway (1896)
- Jack Chumleigh at boarding-school (1899)
- The Disappearance of John Longworthy (1890)
- The Wiles of Sexton Maginnis (1909)
- The Ivy Hedge (1914)

=== Non-fiction ===
- The Theatre and Christian Parents (1885)
- The Ghost in Hamlet, and other essays in comparative literature (1906)
- Everybody's St. Francis (1912)
- Studies in Literature. Some words about Chaucer, and other essays (1916)
- The Corona Readers with James Hiram Fassett (1916)
- Ten Years Near the German Frontier: A Retrospect and a Warning (1919)
- The Knights of Columbus in Peace and War with John James Bright Kennedy (1920)
- Confessions of a Book-Lover (1920)
- Recollections of a Happy Life (1924)

Diplomatic posts
Preceded by Thomas J. O'Brien	U.S. Minister to Denmark; 1907–1917	Succeeded by Norman Hapgood
