= Willy–Nicky correspondence =

Series of letters and telegrams between the German and Russian emperors

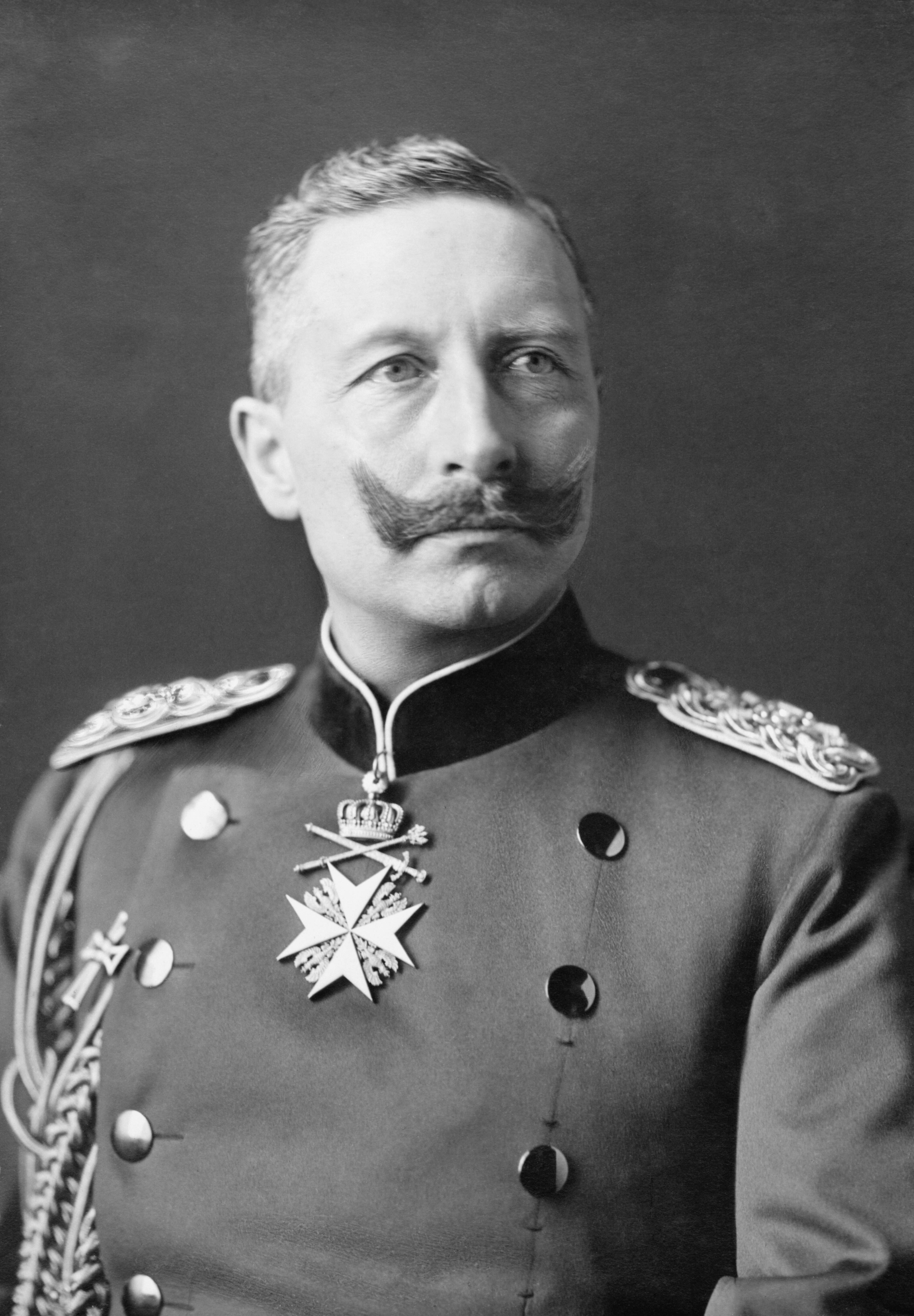
Kaiser Wilhelm II, "Willy"

Emperor Nicholas II, "Nicky"

The Willy–Nicky correspondence was a series of letters and telegrams relayed between Wilhelm II, German Emperor, and Nicholas II, Emperor of Russia from 1894 to the immediate days leading to the First World War in 1914.

== Context and background ==
Wilhelm II and Nicholas II were third cousins (both were great-great-grandsons of Paul I of Russia) as well as being second cousins once removed (both were descended from Frederick William III of Prussia). Wilhelm was also a first cousin of Nicholas's wife, Alix of Hesse, and the eldest grandson of Queen Victoria of the United Kingdom. Nicholas was a grandson of King Christian IX of Denmark and a nephew of Queen Alexandra, consort of King Edward VII of the United Kingdom, as his mother, the Empress Maria Feodorovna, was Queen Alexandra's sister.

The two emperors corresponded in English and were accustomed to calling each other "Willy" and "Nicky" but would use their counterparts' formal names in formal communications.

== Letters ==
The Willy-Nicky letters consist of 75 messages Wilhelm sent to Nicholas between 8 November 1894 (Letter I) and 26 March 1914 (Letter LXXV). The majority were sent from Berlin or the Neues Palais in Potsdam, and others from places as diverse as Rominten, Coburg, Letzlingen, Wilhelmshöhe, Kiel, Posen, Pillau, Gaeta, Corfu (where Wilhelm had a summer retreat), Stamboul, and Damascus. Discovered in the Russian archives in Petrograd, they were transcribed by Russian-American journalist Isaac Don Levine and published in 1920 as Letters from the Kaiser to the Tsar: Copied from government archives in Petrograd unpublished before 1920 (New York: Frederick A. Stokes, 1920).

== Telegrams ==
The Willy-Nicky telegrams consist of a series of ten messages wired between Wilhelm and Nicholas on 29, 30 and 31 July and 1 August 1914. Their source is The German White Book, a pamphlet of official documents published to justify the German government's position after the outbreak of war. The term "Willy-Nicky Telegrams" is derived from The Willy-Nicky Correspondence, the title of a book by Herman Bernstein published in 1918 which revealed the personal telegraphic correspondence between the two emperors during the period of June 1904 to August 1907.

The telegrams start with a plea from Nicholas to Wilhelm to try to stop the serious developments that led up to World War I. An excerpt (29 July 1914, 1 a.m.):

I foresee that very soon I shall be overwhelmed by the pressure forced upon me and be forced to take extreme measures which will lead to war. To try and avoid such a calamity as a European war I beg you in the name of our old friendship to do what you can to stop your allies from going too far. Nicky.

Ultimately, the correspondence changes tone and the two leaders warn each other of impending mobilisation due to factors out of their control, while retaining the notion that mobilisation does not mean war. An excerpt of the last telegram (1 August 1914):

Immediate affirmative clear and unmistakable answer from your government is the only way to avoid endless misery. Until I have received this answer alas, I am unable to discuss the subject of your telegram. As a matter of fact I must request you to immediatly [sic] order your troops on no account to commit the slightest act of trespassing over our frontiers. Willy

Representatives of belligerent nations discussed the telegrams during the war, during the Paris Peace Conference, and on into the interwar years, and beyond. In recent years academic historians have reassessed the exchange. They paid special attention to the telegram of Nicholas dated July 29, 1914, 8:20 p.m.:

Thanks for your telegram conciliatory and friendly. Whereas official message presented today by your ambassador to my minister was conveyed in a very different tone. Beg you to explain this divergency! It would be right to give over the Austro-servian [sic] problem to the Hague conference. Trust in your wisdom and friendship. Your loving Nicky

In this telegram, on 29 July 1914, Nicholas suggested submitting the Austro-Serbian problem to the Hague Conference (in the Hague tribunal) – Wilhelm did not address this in his subsequent telegram. According to James M. Beck, the German Foreign Office omitted this telegram in publishing the correspondence between Wilhelm and Nicholas. After the publication of this telegram by the Russian government on 31 January 1915 in the Official Gazette Governmental Herald, the German Foreign Office explained that they regarded this telegram as too "unimportant". In contrast, the Russian Foreign Ministry (Sergey Sazonov), as well as the French Ambassador in Russia (Maurice Paléologue) believed the telegram was very important. Paléologue, Beck, and some other authors accused Wilhelm in that he had not supported the proposal of Nicholas to submit the Austro-Serbian problem to the Hague Tribunal for adjustment, and thus abandoned the chance for a peaceful resolution to this problem.

A "flurry of telegrams" between Wilhelm and Nicholas led to the cancellation of Russian general mobilisation by the latter on 29 July, but under pressure from Sazonov this was resumed two days later, and on 1 August 1914, both Germany and Russia found themselves at war.
