= Frederick Gardner Clapp =

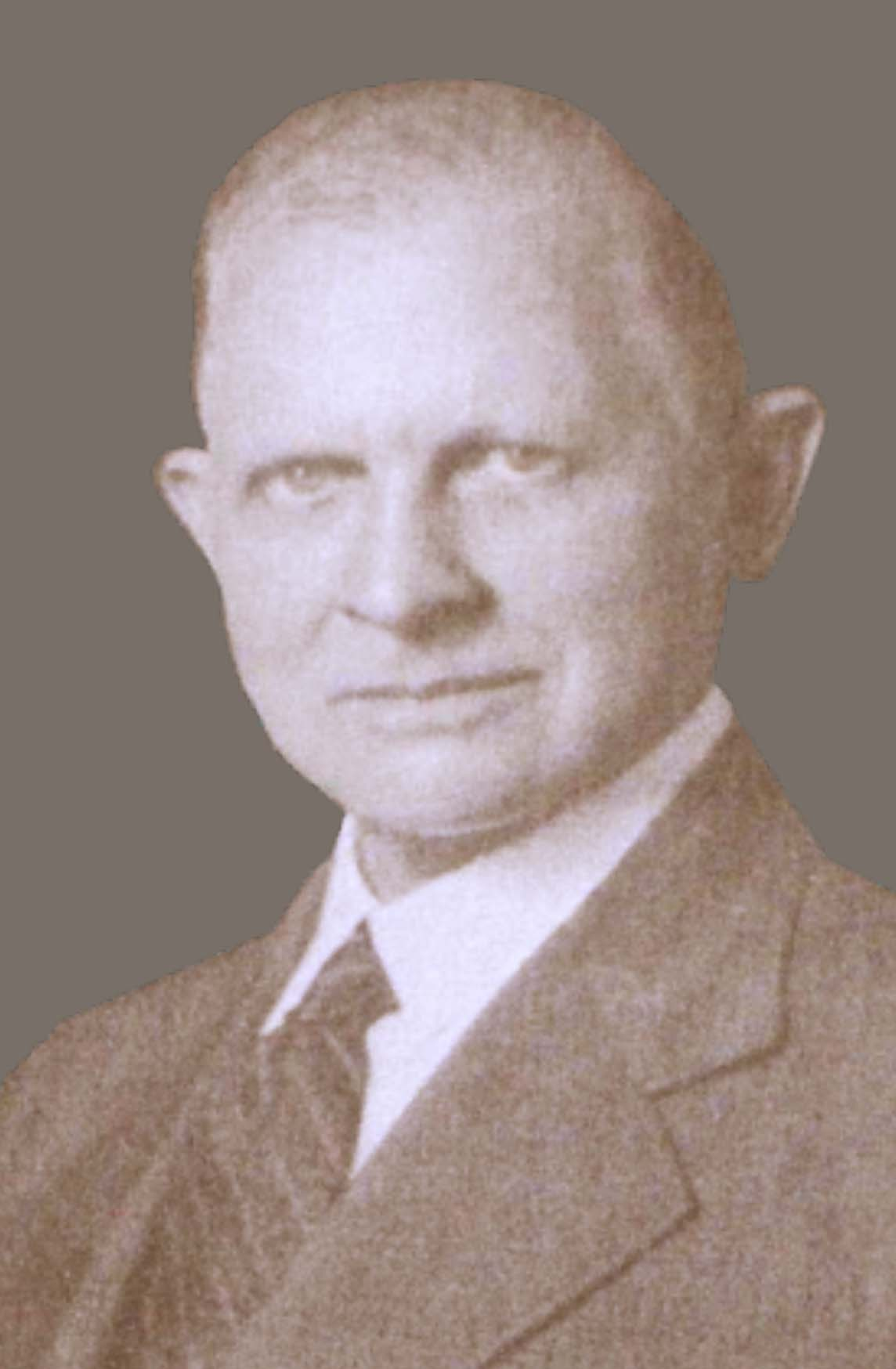
Frederick G. Clapp

Frederick Gardner Clapp (1879–1944) was an American petroleum geologist considered to be the "first American to make a living wholly as a consultant in petroleum geology in 1908."

== Biography ==
Clapp was born in Boston, July 20, 1879, and died in Chickasha, Oklahoma, February 18, 1944. He graduated from the Massachusetts Institute of Technology in 1901. After working for the United States Geological Survey from 1902 to 1908, he joined the Associated Geological Engineers in 1911 as a founding member; the firm became the Associated Petroleum Engineers in 1917, the largest geological consulting organization in the United States.

He performed oil exploration projects for the US Bureau of Mines from 1910 to 1913, was consulting expert for Department of Mines, Canada, between 1913 and 1915, directed geological parties in China from 1915 to 1918, and conducted oil explorations in Australia and New Zealand for Gisborne Oil, Ltd, between 1923 and 1924. Fred Clapp was a visiting lecturer at Harvard in 1921 and an expert witness in the 1923 "Teapot Dome" investigation. In 1927 he was petroleum advisor to the Imperial Government of Iran during the formation of the Anglo-Persian Oil Company working for Reza Shah, and again in 1933 working with Charles C. Hart, former United States minister to Iran, resulting in a concession covering 200,000 square miles (520,000 km^{2}) for construction of a 1,700-mile (2,700 km) pipeline controlled by Seaboard Oil Company, for whom Clapp served as director, and dissolved after the Nazis arrived.

Fred Clapp's geology projects often overlapped with 1927 surveys in Egypt, Palestine, France (1929), the West Indies (1930–1932), the Dominican Republic and Haiti (1935). He was closely involved with the initial development of the Cement Oil fields in Oklahoma and appraised a number of oil companies in Texas between 1930 and 1932. He served in similar capacities for the government of Turkey in 1943 shortly before his death.

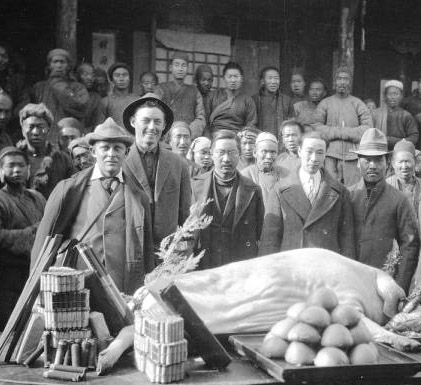
Clapp, third from left, during his two-year geology trip across China, hosting NY Day Feast 1915, Tien-tou, China

== Work ==
In the United States he conducted field studies in Texas, Oklahoma, and Wyoming. He also worked in Canada, Mexico, the Dominican Republic, Cuba, Haiti, France Romania, Australia, New Zealand, Iran, Egypt, Palestine, Turkey, Afghanistan, and China.

== Recognition ==
Clapp was a fellow of the Geological Society of America, the American Geographical Society, the American Association for the Advancement of Science, the New York Academy of Sciences, and the Royal Geographical Society.
