= Seal and Serpent Society =

American social society at Cornell University

Seal and Serpent

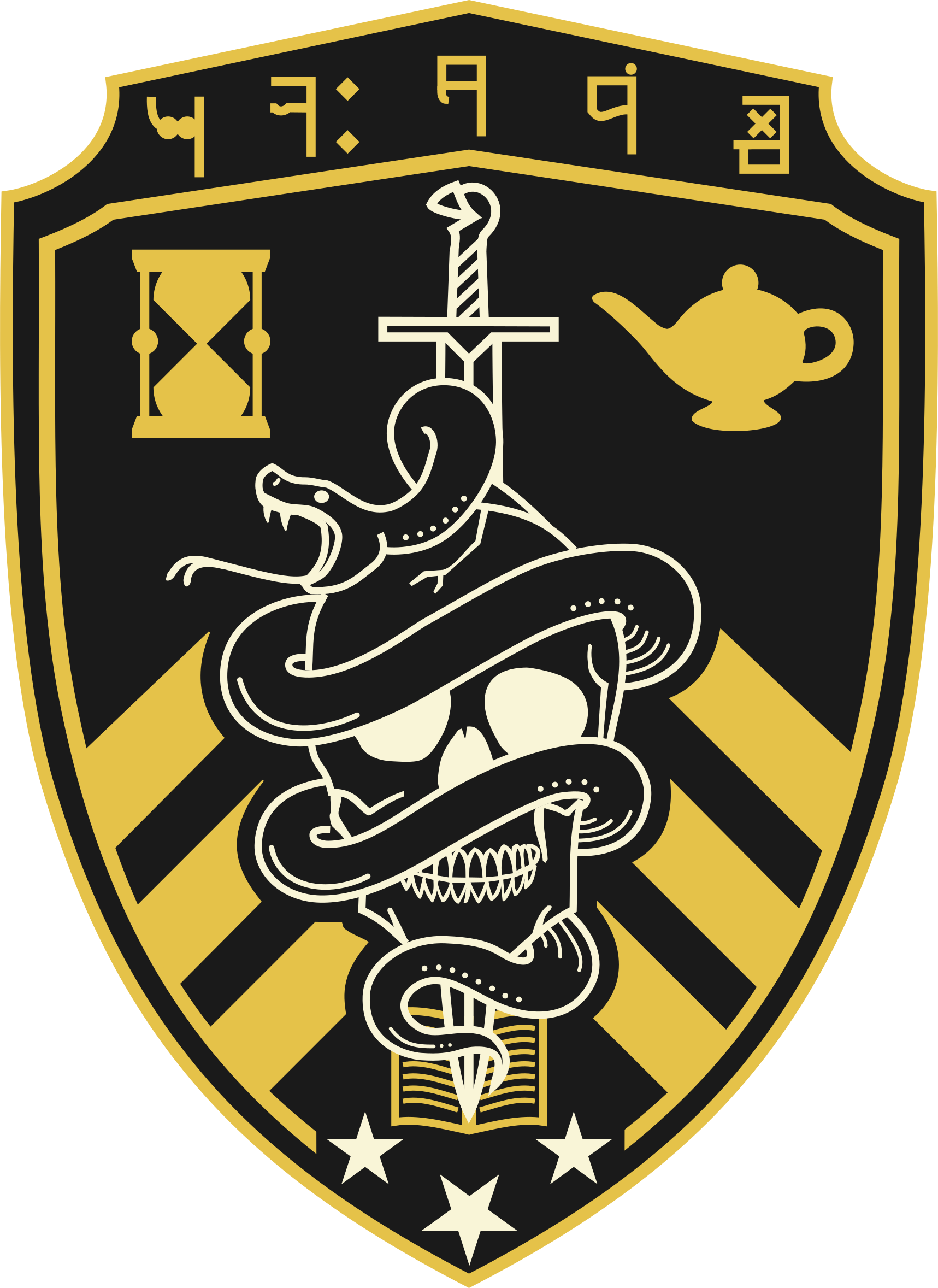
- Founded: April 2, 1905; 121 years ago Cornell University
- Type: Social Society
- Affiliation: Independent
- Status: Active
- Scope: Local
- Member badge
- Colors: Black and Gold
- Chapters: 1
- Headquarters: 305 Thurston Avenue; Ithaca, New York 14850; United States
- Website: www.sealandserpent.org

The Seal and Serpent Society ( ) is a gender neutral local fraternity at Cornell University in Ithaca, New York. Founded in 1905, it is one of the university's oldest societies.

Seal and Serpent functions as a social club, In fall 2016, the society Left the Cornell Interfraternity Council, thereby becoming an independent social society. In 2020, the society declared itself gender-neutral.

== History ==
Seal and Serpent Society formed on April 2, 1905 by the merger of two Cornell University undergraduate groups: the Crooks' Club and the Senators. Members of the two societies met during the Cornell Army ROTC's drill practice. Although initially an informal group, the ten original members met in the fall of 1905 to formalize the fraternity, elect officers, and make housing plans. They called themselves the Society of the Seal and Serpent. Alvin Ward "Gub" King was elected president as a sort of coalition man not involved too much with either of the two original groups.

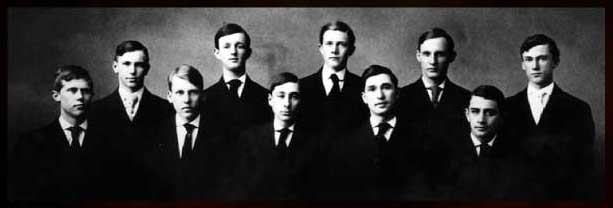
The founders of Seal and Serpent in 1906 (From left to right: S. Blunt, Ruhlen, McConnell, Shepherd, Springg, A. Blunt, Kuehns, Zimmerman, and King)

The original "snakes" or founders of Seal and Serpent were Albert Church Blunt Jr., Stanhope Eccleston Blunt, Alvin Ward King, Romeo Benvenuto Kuehns, Harold McConnell, Benjamin Stuart McConnell, George Ruhlen Jr., Alfred William Shepherd, Carrollton Crawford Sprigg, and Earl William Zimmerman

When the society's first members graduated in 1907, they pledged $100 each to establish a building fund. This allowed Seal and Serpent to purchase a remodel a house on West Avenue in 1908. In 1913, the society purchased land at 305 Thurston Avenue for a purpose-built chapter house or lodge. However, construction was delayed by World War I. While its members were fighting in the war, Seal and Serpent's West Avenue house was used as ROTC barracks. Its new house or lodge was not constructed until 1926.

Seal and Serpent was incorporated in 1919. During the Great Depression, the majority of Cornell's independent social clubs merged into national fraternities, and the university purchased the property where many fraternities now reside. Seal and Serpent was one of two societies at Cornell that survived the Great Depression as an independent fraternity. It 1940, it became the only local fraternity on campus. During World War II, the society's lodge was used by the university. After the war in 1946, Seal and Serpent only had six active members. However, after a couple of years, it reestablished its prominence on campus with sixty active members.

The society's membership declined in the 1970s. In December 1971, the society's lodge became the host for Alpha House, a long-term rehabilitation center for drug addicts, allowing up to ten former heroin addicts to live on-site from twelve to eighteen months. The fraternity's members provided supervision for participants in the independently operated rehabilitation program. When its membership declined again in the 1970s and 1980s, the society began to admit women as associate members in the early 1980s. This practice continued for twenty years, giving the female members various levels of involvement in the society's operations.

2005 marked the Centennial Anniversary of the Seal and Serpent Society. Hundreds of brothers from around the world returned to Ithaca for Homecoming to commemorate this major milestone, and a capital campaign coordinated with the event raised substantial funds for further renovation and upkeep of the Lodge.

Today, Seal and Serpent is the only independent social society at Cornell University. It participated as a local men's fraternity within the Cornell Interfraternity Council until the fall of 2016 when the active chapter voted to terminate its membership in the IFC, becoming a fully independent student organization. This decision stemmed, in part, over the university's new limits on the recruitment period for fraternities. As a result, Seal and Serpent is no longer recognized by the university as a fraternity.

Women have been included in the proceedings of the Seal and Serpent Society since the 80s. In 2020, Seal and Serpent Society became gender-neutral. Its former female associate members have been offered full membership and all new classes have since included men and women alike.

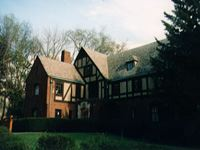
The Seal and Serpent Lodge

== Symbols ==
Rather than using Greek letters, the Seal and Serpent Society uses the Sanskrit letters . Its name was pulled from an ancient Sanskrit source..

== Lodge ==
The Seal and Serpent Lodge is located at 305 Thurston Avenue. The society purchased the land in 1913. Construction began in 1926 on a Tudor style, half-timbered lodge with 23 bedrooms. The lodge was formally dedicated on October 22, 1927.

Mark Kirk, president of Seal and Serpent in 1981.

== Notable members ==
- Clift Andrus – U.S. Army general officer and commander of the 1st Infantry Division in 1944-5.
- Menas Kafatos – physicist and prolific writer on spirituality, science, and religion
- Mark Kirk – United States Senator
- Gligor Tashkovich – Minister of Foreign Investment, Republic of Macedonia (2006–2008)
- Bob Saget (honorary) – actor and comedian
- Timothy C. Slater – entrepreneur and trader who founded CompuTrac
- William Ryerson—former diplomat
- Edward Isley Tinkham—first person to carry the American flag overseas during WWI

== Popular culture ==
In 2010, Seal & Serpent was featured in the A&E Network TV show Strange Days with Bob Saget in an episode exploring Ivy League life.
