= Nancy VanHorn =

American diplomat

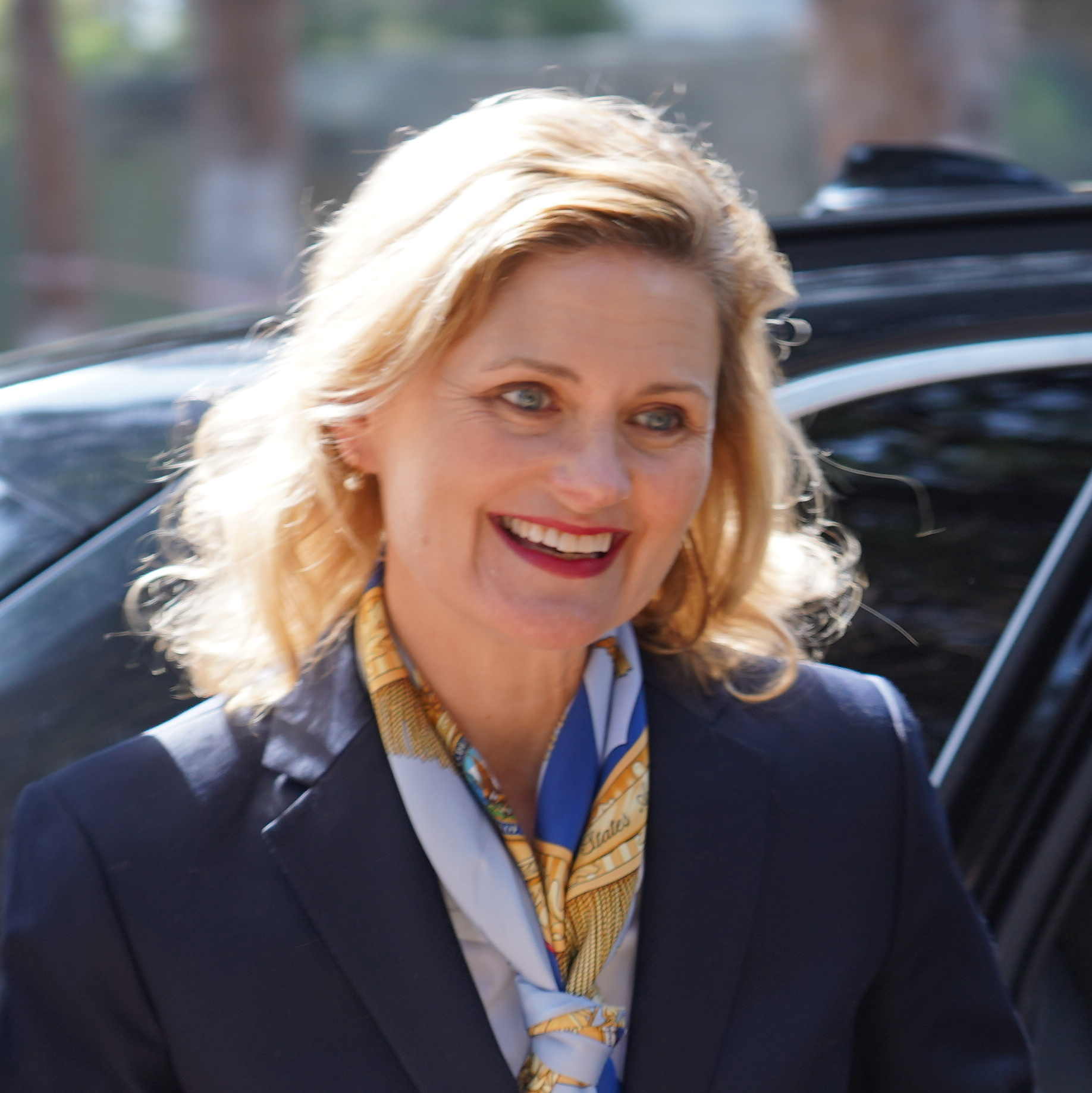
- VanHorn in April 2025

Chargé d'affaires ad interim to Albania
- In office August 2, 2024 – September 24, 2026
- President: Joe Biden; Donald Trump
- Preceded by: David Wisner (Chargé d'affaires)
- Succeeded by: Eric Wendt (Ambassador)

Deputy Chief of Mission to Albania
- Incumbent
- Assumed office September 25, 2026
- President: Donald Trump
- Website: Deputy Chief of Mission to Albania

Nancy VanHorn is the current Deputy Chief of Mission at the US Embassy in Albania, having previously served as chargé d'affaires from August 2024 to September 2026.

After joining the US Foreign Service in 2007, VanHorn served at various United States embassies, including those in Sri Lanka and Bangladesh. During her time in Albania, she expressed support for the Special Structure against Corruption and Organized Crime (SPAK).

VanHorn has two sons.
