= Satan Sanderson (film) =

- Film poster
- Directed by: John W. Noble
- Based on: Satan Sanderson by Hallie Erminie Rives
- Produced by: B. A. Rolfe
- Starring: Orrin Johnson; Irene Warfield
- Cinematography: Herbert Oswald Carleton
- Production company: Rolfe Photoplays
- Distributed by: Metro Pictures
- Release date: March 29, 1915
- Running time: 5 reels
- Country: United States
- Language: Silent (English intertitles)

Satan Sanderson is a 1915 silent drama film directed by John W. Noble. It is based on the 1907 novel of the same name.

== Premise ==
David Stires is signing his will, making Jessica his sole heir, thereby disinheriting his dissolute son, Hugh. Jessica protests and Reverend Sanderson appeals to David Stires on behalf of his son, Hugh. Sanderson acknowledges that he him-' self was wayward while in college, and as a recognized leader of the fast set of boys, Hugh looked up to him as his ideal, and that He, Sanderson feels a great responsibility for Hugh's downfall. David Stires is obdurate; Jessica's sympathy goes out to Hugh in a romantic manner and she holds Sanderson morally responsible for Hugh. Sanderson has learned to love Jessica, later Hugh returns home and succeeds in getting his father's forgiveness, he marries Jessica. At this time a medical operation restores her sight. At the moment of the wedding a check is presented to David Stires signed with his own name, the signature having been forged by his son, Hugh. David Stires, in his rage, threatens his son with jail.

== Cast ==
- Orrin Johnson as Satan Sanderson
- Irene Warfield as Jessica Holmes

== Reception ==
A contemporary review in the Ogden Examiner stated that the film was better than both the novel and the play it was based on.
