= Erla Mëhilli =

Albanian television presenter and former political spokesperson

- Born: 30 June 1982 (age 43); Tirana, PSR Albania
- Occupations: Television presenter, journalist, political spokesperson
- Known for: Now me Erla Mëhillin (Euronews Albania)
- Spouse: Keltis Kruja
- Children: 2

Erla Mëhilli (born 30 June 1982) is an Albanian television presenter, journalist and former political spokesperson. She hosts the political talk show "NOW me Erla Mëhillin" ("Now with Erla Mëhilli") on Euronews Albania.

== Career ==
=== Political communication ===
For a number of years, Mëhilli served as spokesperson for former Prime Minister Sali Berisha and for the Democratic Party of Albania.

=== Television and broadcasting ===
Mëhilli later transitioned to television journalism and political commentary. She joined Euronews Albania and launched the program "NOW me Erla Mëhillin", a show focusing on current affairs and political debate.

She also created a format under the concept "Pa filtra dhe montazhe" ("without barriers or montages,") intended to engage more direct political discussion.

In January 2022, she interviewed former U.S. Ambassador Yuri Kim on her show "NOW".

== Personal life ==
Mëhilli is married to politician Keltis Kruja, and they have two sons.
