= Satan Sanderson =

1907 novel by Hallie Erminie Rives

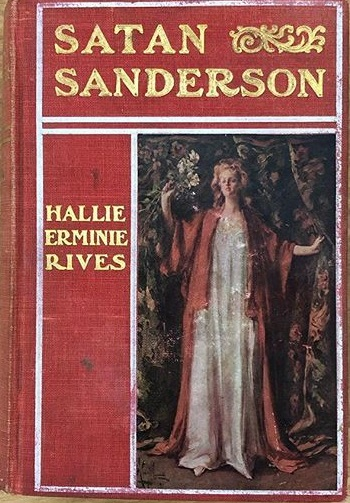
- Book cover
- Author: Hallie Erminie Rives
- Illustrator: Albert Beck Wenzell
- Language: English
- Genre: Novel
- Publisher: Bobbs-Merrill Company
- Publication date: August 17, 1907
- Media type: Print (hardcover)

Satan Sanderson is a 1907 novel by Hallie Erminie Rives. It ranked as the sixth best-selling novel in the United States that year.

== Plot ==
The novel follows Harry Sanderson, a reformed college rake turned clergyman, and his onetime friend Hugh Stires, whom he closely resembles. Hugh marries his family's ward Jessica Holme, who is blind. But he is then exposed as a criminal for forging his father’s signature on a $5,000 bank draft. His accomplice, Doctor Moreau, a disgraced physician and gambler, later tries to extort him, leading Hugh to shoot and kill him (later claiming he'd meant only to frighten him). Hugh flees. Meanwhile, Harry loses his memory in a crash, and is mistaken for Hugh in their mining town. Accepting this identity (being amnesiac), he rehabilitates Hugh’s reputation while falling in love with Jessica. During this time, Hugh gambles away money he had previously won from Harry. When he hears that his mining claim has struck it rich (under Harry's supervision, unbeknownst to Hugh), he returns home. Harry is arrested for Moreau’s murder and is on the verge of being found guilty. But Hugh, mortally injured in a fire, reaches the courthouse in time to exonerate Harry before dying. This leaves Harry and Jessica free to marry.

== Reception ==
The Bookseller, Newsdealer and Stationer wrote that the book was "filled with melodramatic scenes and complicated situations, as the author has put no curb on flights of her imagination, but the story is calculated to make a sensation with the great mass of book buyers, and dealers will probably find it to be one of the six best sellers." The Reader (also published by the Bobbs-Merrill Company, who published the book) conceded the book was a melodrama but stated "four hundred critics out of three hundred and ninety-nine will say in concentrated condemnation that it is 'melodramatic', and think they have damned it for the unpardonable sin. Meanwhile four hundred thousand of the unenlightened public will read it with a rush, and enjoy it with a wholesale and wholesome thoroughness." Nevertheless, The New York Times was among those who gave it a positively melodramatic review, announcing it "the most extravagantly audacious plot and the most sensationally dramatic situations ever indulged in by an American writer of fiction."

Though only released on August 17, 1907, the book was ranked as the sixth best-selling novel in the United States for 1907. In the monthly rankings in The Bookman (which published the "six-best sellers" list), the book was #3 in the country in the October 1907 issue (which was based on sales in August 1907), #2 in November, and #5 in December. In the January 1908 issue it was #4. It dropped off the top six in the February 1908 issue, though it remained on some of the city-specific top six lists through the May 1908 issue.

The book and its adaptations to the stage and film have received scant attention since the 1920s. In 2017, a site reviewing 20th century bestsellers called the novel a "patchwork of implausibilities performed by manikins," noting that with the setup of the novel, the author could have "aimed the plot in any of several directions" but instead "she chose to take them all."

== Adaptations ==
The book was adapted to a stage play featuring Norman Hackett, with the (dramatic) book by Kirk Alexander. It debuted in Toledo on September 10, 1911, and toured widely.

The book was also adapted to a silent film released on March 29, 1915, directed by John W. Noble and starring Orrin Johnson, Irene Warfield, and Charles Prince. It was the first movie to film scenes at Princeton University, and college students served as extras, which Johnson helped to procure as a graduate of the college. The movie is believed to be a lost film.
