= Hallie Erminie Rives =

American novelist

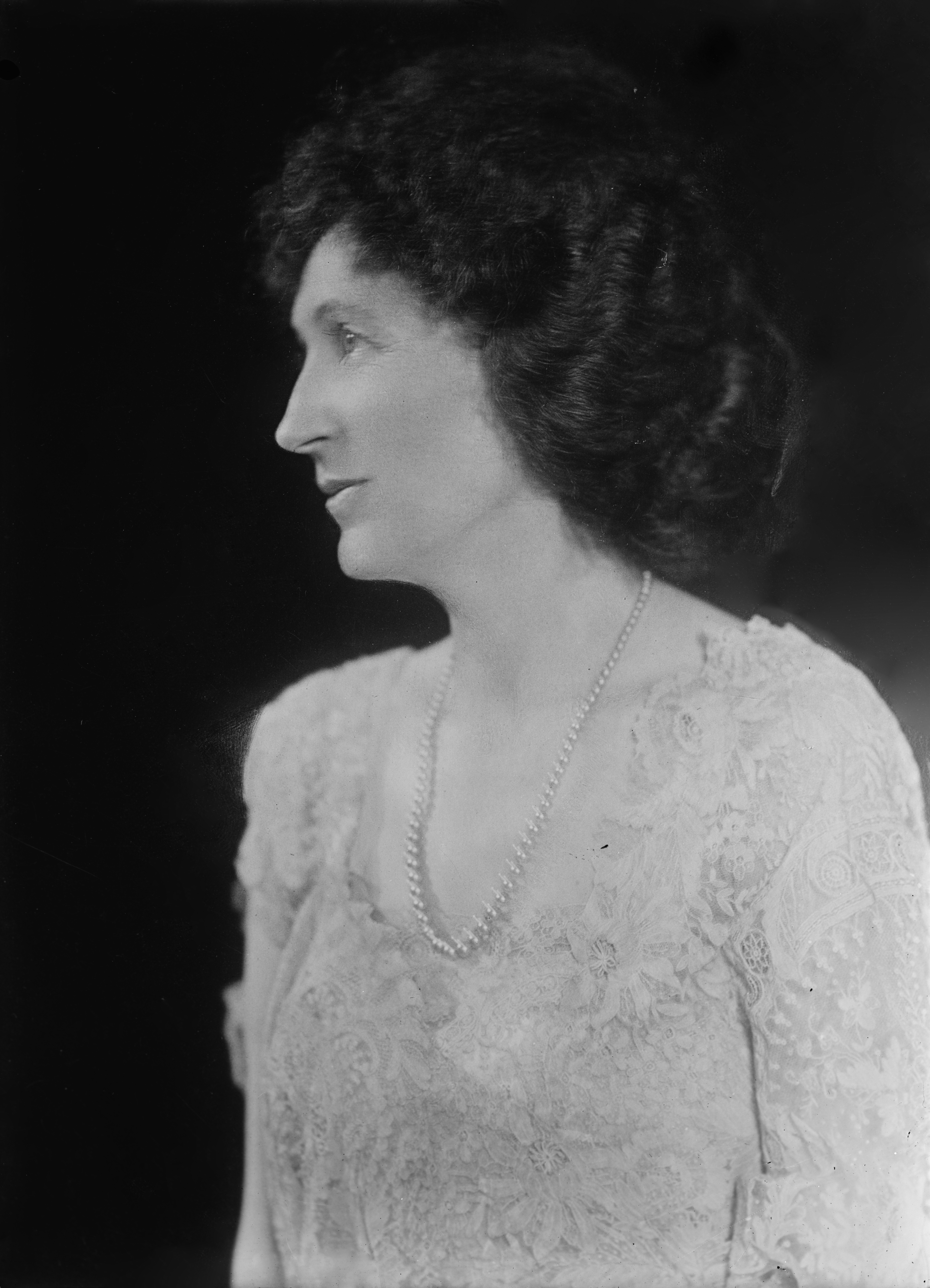
- Rives in 1918
- Born: May 2, 1874; Hopkinsville, Kentucky
- Died: August 16, 1956 (aged 82); New York City, New York
- Resting place: Riverside Cemetery, Hopkinsville, Christian County, Kentucky, United States
- Occupation: Novelist
- Spouse: Post Wheeler
- Relatives: Mary Sparkes Wheeler (mother-in-law)

Signature
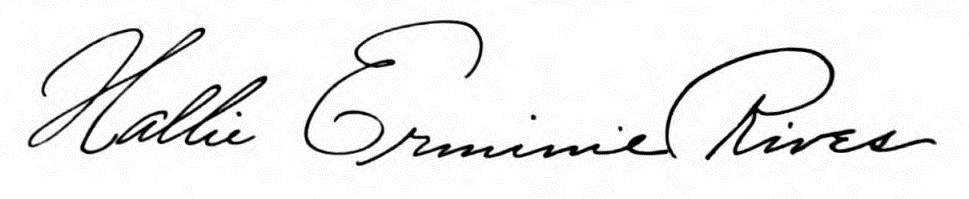

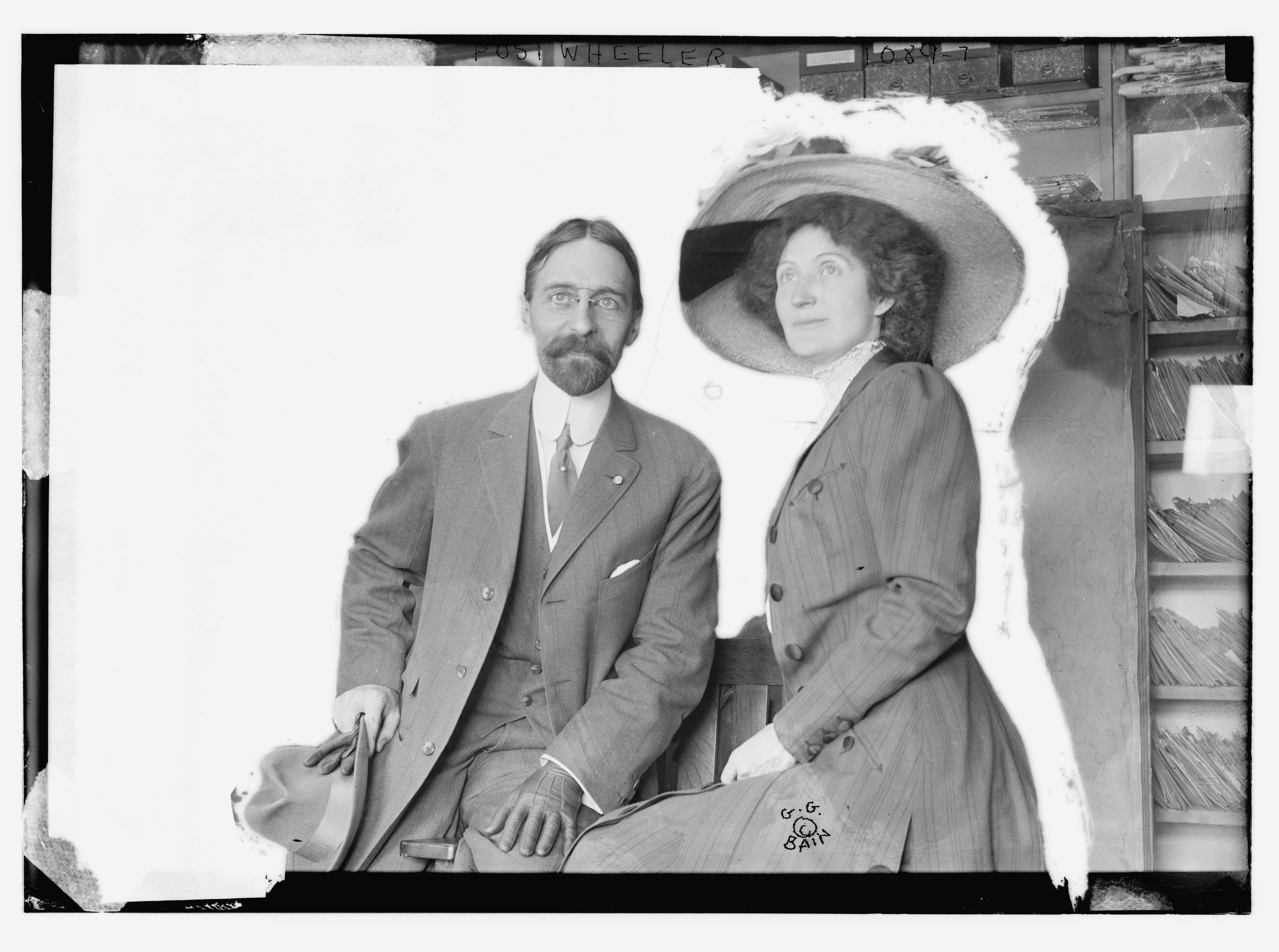
Hallie Erminie Rives with her husband, Post Wheeler

Hallie Erminie Rives (May 2, 1874 – August 16, 1956) was a best-selling popular novelist and wife of the American diplomat Post Wheeler.

== Biography ==
She was born on May 2, 1874, in Hopkinsville, Kentucky, the daughter of Stephen Turner Rives and Mary Ragsdale. Her father was from a prominent Virginia family. She was a distant cousin of the novelist and poet Amélie Rives Troubetzkoy. An author's biography in one of her books notes that her father, who had fought for the Confederacy during the American Civil War and spent two years in a Northern prison camp, had "made her his little comrade" when she was a child and she was an excellent rifle shot and a bareback rider who was called "the Rives' little wildcat" by outsiders. Her father allowed her to spend so much time outdoors because her mother had been an invalid in the years before she died.

Rives wrote her first novel at age eight, though her writing was not encouraged by her parents. Her first novel was published when she was eighteen. In her novels she addressed politics between the Northern and Southern United States, issues of race, and sex, causing great debate among critics. Among them was Smoking Flax (1897), a novel controversial even at the time, which takes a favorable position on lynching. The novel is about an African American man accused of raping and murdering a white woman who was lynched after the governor commuted his sentence to life. Many of her novels were bestsellers. Other books she wrote were better received by critics than Smoking Flax. Her novel, The Castaway, is noted for being the subject of a Supreme Court copyright case, Bobbs-Merrill v. Straus, in which the US Supreme Court recognized the first sale doctrine, permitting purchasers of copies of books to resell them without seeking permission from the copyright holder.

She married Wheeler in 1906 in Tokyo. A wedding announcement noted that Wheeler initially considered Rives "rather severe on men" in her books and she considered him "none too charitable concerning the faults of women" in his book Reflections of a Bachelor. They met at a reception in New York and began a friendship that eventually led to marriage. She accompanied him to posts across Europe, Asia and South America throughout his career in foreign service. She and her husband co-wrote Dome of Many-Coloured Glass in 1952 about their lives in the United States Foreign Service.

She died on August 16, 1956, in New York City, New York. Her widower died on Christmas Eve, December 23, 1956, at the Frances Convalescent Home in Neptune, New Jersey, just 4 months later.

== Works ==
- The Singing Wire and Other Stories (1892)
- A Fool in Spots (1894)
- Smoking Flax (1897)
- As the Hart Panteth (1898)
- A Furnace of Earth (1900)
- Hearts Courageous (1902)
- The Castaway (1904)
- In the Wake of War (1905)
- Satan Sanderson (1907), adapted to film
- The Kingdom of Slender Swords (1910)
- The Valiants of Virginia (1912)
- Tales from Dickens (1917)
- The Long Lane's Turning (1917)
- The Complete Book of Etiquette (1926)
- The Magic Man (1927)
- The Golden Barrier (1934)
- The John Book (1947)
- Dome of Many Coloured Glass (1952)
