= William Edwin Ryerson =

American diplomat (born 1936)

6th United States Ambassador to Albania
- In office December 21, 1991 – October 13, 1994
- Preceded by: Hugh Gladney Grant
- Succeeded by: Joseph Edward Lake

Personal details
- Born: December 10, 1936 (age 89) Pompton Lakes, New Jersey
- Education: Cornell University

William Edwin Ryerson (born December 10, 1936) is an American former diplomat who was a career Foreign Service Officer. He served as the U.S. Ambassador Extraordinary and Plenipotentiary to Albania from 1991 until 1994.

Ryerson was born in Pompton Lakes, New Jersey on December 10, 1936. After a 52-year break, diplomatic relations between the United States and Albania were re-established on March 15, 1991. The U.S. Embassy in Tirana opened October 1, 1991. Christopher Hill as Chargé d'Affaires ad interim until Ryerson presented his credentials on December 21, 1991.

The Cornell University graduate (he began as an engineering major before switching to history) was consul general in Yugoslavia in the late 1980s. He is a member of the Seal and Serpent Society.
