= List of ambassadors of the United States to Albania =

Ambassador of the United States to Albania
- Ambasadori i Shteteve të Bashkuara në Shqipëri
- Seal of the United States Department of State

- Flag of a United States ambassador

- Incumbent; Eric Wendt since September 26, 2026
- Nominator: The president of the United States
- Appointer: The president; with Senate advice and consent
- Inaugural holder: Ulysses Grant-Smith as Envoy Extraordinary and Minister Plenipotentiary
- Formation: September 22, 1922
- Website: Ambassador to Albania

This is a list of ambassadors of the United States to Albania. The ambassador is the head of the Embassy of the United States in Tirana.

== History ==
Albania had been under the domination of the Ottoman Empire since the 14th century, but gained a shaky independence in 1912 after an uprising against the Turks. After suffering invasions and occupations during the First and Second Balkan Wars and the Great War, Albania achieved a relatively stable degree of statehood.

The United States established diplomatic relations with Albania in 1922. President Harding appointed the first U.S. Minister to Albania, Ulysses Grant-Smith, who arrived in Tirana in December 1922. The first envoys to Albania had the rank of Minister.

Albania–United States relations were broken in 1939 upon the Italian invasion of Albania just prior to the start of World War II. Relations were not restored until the downfall of Communism in Europe in 1991.

== Ambassadors ==
#	Name	Title	Appointed	Presented credentials	Terminated mission
1	Ulysses Grant-Smith – Career FSO	Envoy Extraordinary and Minister Plenipotentiary	September 22, 1922	December 4, 1922	Left post, February 8, 1925
2	Charles C. Hart – Political appointee	Envoy Extraordinary and Minister Plenipotentiary	May 27, 1925	August 1, 1925, and December 13, 1928	Left post, December 12, 1929
3	Herman Bernstein – Political appointee	Envoy Extraordinary and Minister Plenipotentiary	February 17, 1930	April 28, 1930	Left post, September 24, 1933
4	Post Wheeler – Career FSO	Envoy Extraordinary and Minister Plenipotentiary	August 26, 1933	November 28, 1933	Left post, November 1, 1934
5	Hugh Gladney Grant – Political appointee	Envoy Extraordinary and Minister Plenipotentiary	August 9, 1935	November 8, 1935	Left post, September 27, 1939
	Italian forces occupied Tirana on April 8, 1939, which effectively brought an end to the U.S. mission to Albania. The U.S. legation was officially closed on September 16, 1939. The United States resumed diplomatic relations with Albania on March 15, 1991. Embassy Tirana was opened October 1, 1991, with Christopher R. Hill as Chargé d’Affaires ad interim. The previous legation was raised to embassy status, and the envoys would henceforth have the rank of Ambassador.				
6	William Edwin Ryerson – Career FSO	Ambassador Extraordinary and Plenipotentiary	December 2, 1991	December 21, 1991	Left post, October 13, 1994
7	Joseph Edward Lake – Career FSO	Ambassador Extraordinary and Plenipotentiary	July 5, 1994	October 17, 1994	Left post, March 15, 1996
8	Marisa R. Lino – Career FSO	Ambassador Extraordinary and Plenipotentiary	July 2, 1996	September 4, 1996	May 20, 1999
9	Joseph Limprecht – Career FSO	Ambassador Extraordinary and Plenipotentiary	July 7, 1999	September 8, 1999	Died in northern Albania, May 19, 2002
10	James Franklin Jeffrey – Career FSO	Ambassador Extraordinary and Plenipotentiary	October 3, 2002	October 22, 2002	May 2, 2004
11	Marcie B. Ries – Career FSO	Ambassador Extraordinary and Plenipotentiary	October 18, 2004	October 30, 2004	June 16, 2007
12	John L. Withers, II – Career FSO	Ambassador Extraordinary and Plenipotentiary	June 28, 2007	August 29, 2007	November 10, 2010
13	Alexander Arvizu – Career FSO	Ambassador Extraordinary and Plenipotentiary	July 1, 2010	December 6, 2010	January 11, 2015
14	Donald Lu – Career FSO	Ambassador Extraordinary and Plenipotentiary	December 16, 2014	January 13, 2015	September 19, 2018
-	Leyla Moses-Ones - Career FSO	Chargé d'Affaires a.i.	September 19, 2018		January 27, 2020
15	Yuri Kim - Career General	Ambassador Extraordinary and Plenipotentiary	November 21, 2019	January 27, 2020	June 25, 2023
-	Damian Smith - Career FSO	Chargé d'Affaires a.i.	June 26, 2023		August 1, 2023
-	H. Martin McDowell - Career FSO	Chargé d'Affaires a.i.	August 1, 2023		August 18, 2023
-	David Wisner - Career FSO	Chargé d'Affaires a.i.	August 18, 2023		August 2, 2024
-	Nancy VanHorn - Career FSO	Chargé d'Affaires a.i.	August 2, 2024		September 24, 2026
16	Eric Wendt – Political appointee	Ambassador Extraordinary and Plenipotentiary	August 7, 2026	September 26, 2026	Incumbent

== See also ==
- Embassy of the United States, Tirana
- Albania – United States relations
- Foreign relations of Albania
- Ambassadors of the United States
