= The Light at Dusk =

1916 film by Edgar Lewis

The Light at Dusk (aka:Light at Dusk)
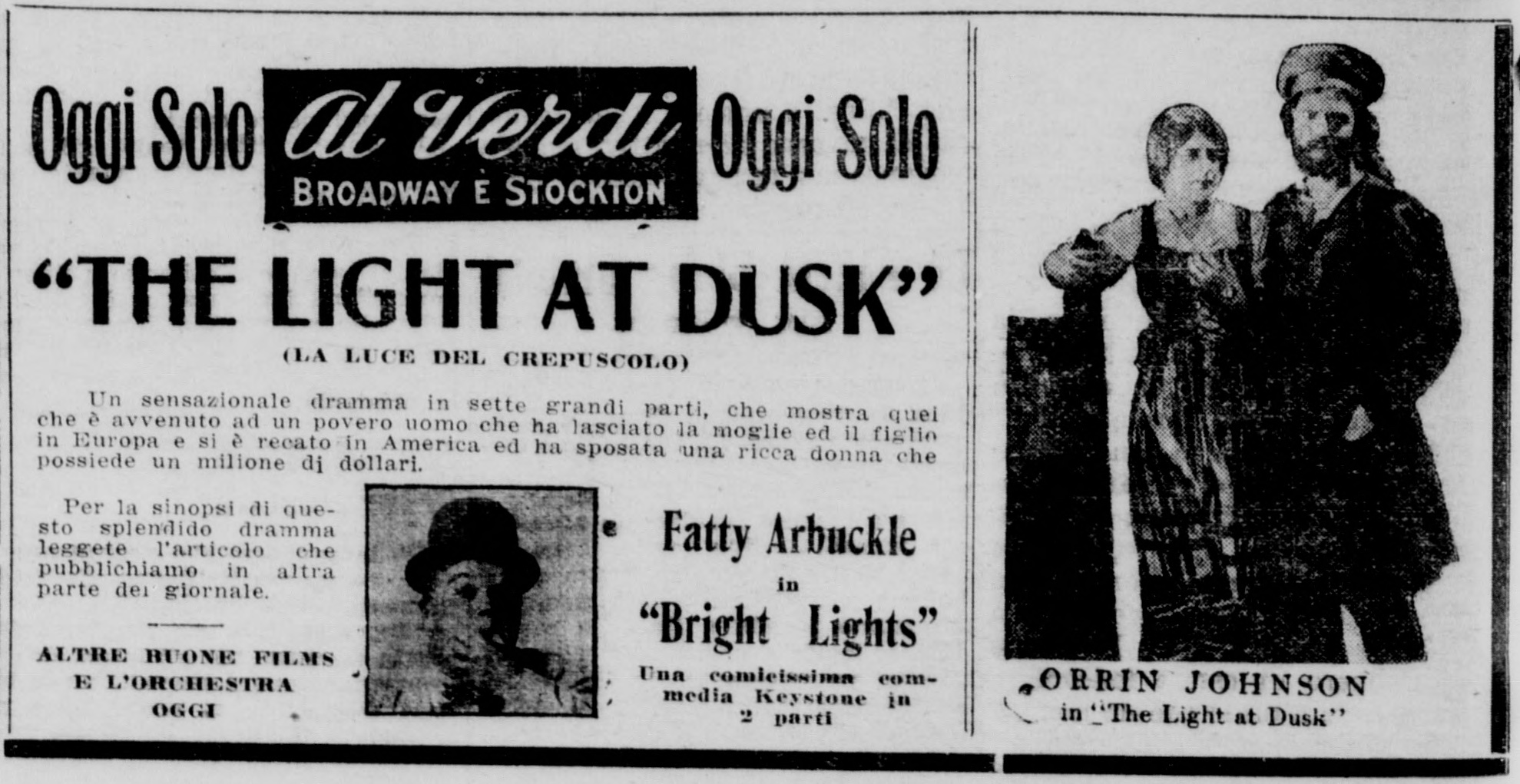
- An Italian American advertisement for the film
- Directed by: Edgar Lewis
- Written by: Anthony Paul Kelly
- Produced by: Siegmund Lubin
- Starring: Orrin Johnson; Mary Carr
- Cinematography: Edward C. Earle
- Distributed by: V-L-S-E
- Release date: July 31, 1916
- Running time: 6 reels
- Country: USA
- Language: Silent ...English titles

The Light at Dusk is a lost 1916 silent film drama directed by Edgar Lewis and produced by the Lubin Manufacturing Company.

== Cast ==
- Orrin Johnson - Vladimir Krestovsky/Mr. Krest
- Mary Carr - Natasha (*as Mary Kennavan Carr)
- Sally Crute - Mrs. Krest
- Hedda Kuszewski - Olga
- Robert Frazer - Nicholas (*Robert W. Frazer)
- Evelyn Terrill - Frances Farrell
