= Post Wheeler =

American journalist, writer and diplomat

George Post Wheeler
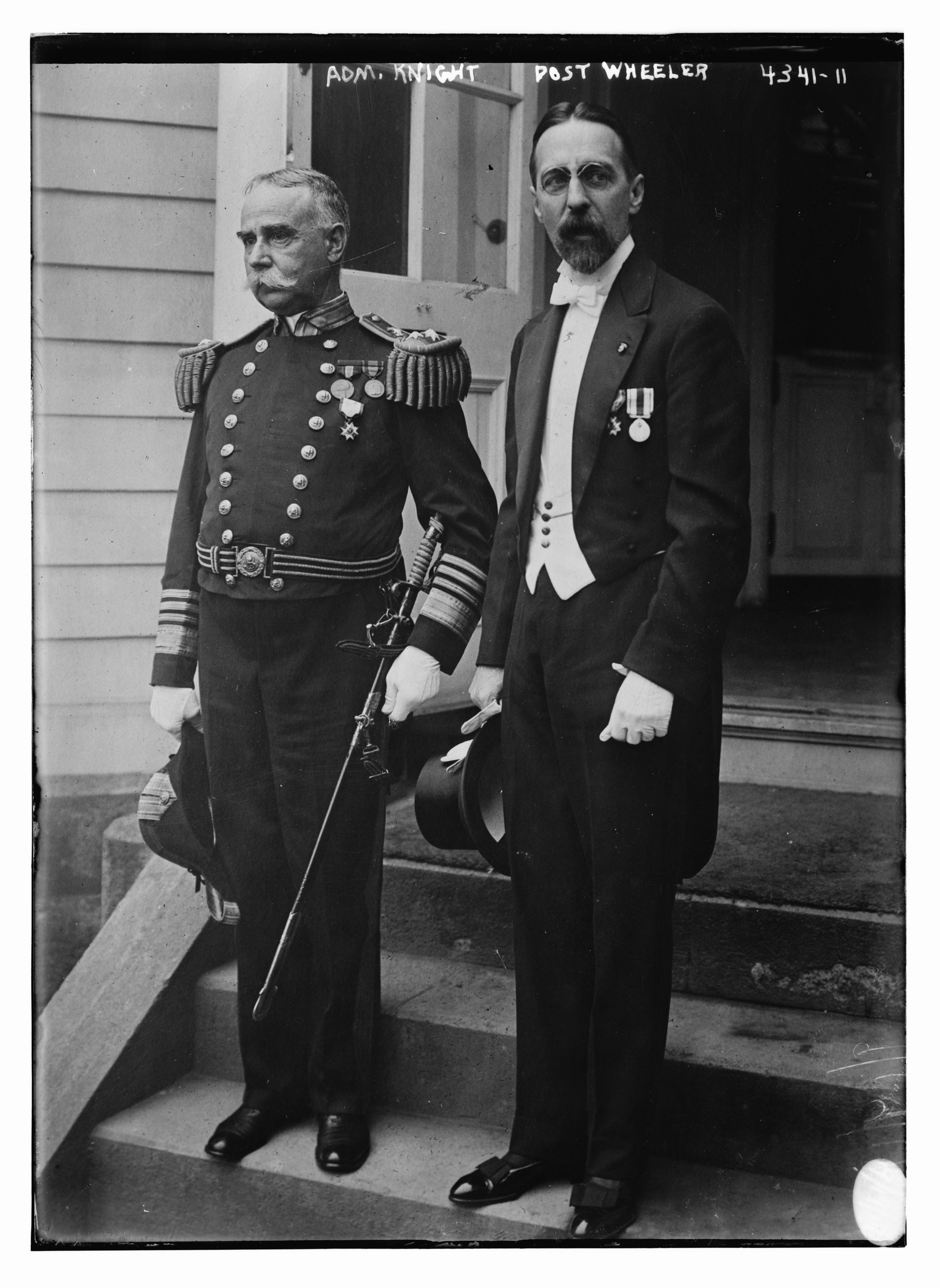
- Admiral Austin Melvin Knight and Post Wheeler in 1918

4th United States Minister to Albania
- In office November 28, 1933 – November 1, 1934
- President: Franklin D. Roosevelt
- Preceded by: Herman Bernstein
- Succeeded by: Hugh Gladney Grant

United States Minister to Paraguay
- In office February 12, 1930 – April 17, 1933
- President: Herbert Hoover; Franklin D. Roosevelt
- Preceded by: George Lewis Kreeck
- Succeeded by: Meredith Nicholson

Personal details
- Born: George Post Wheeler; August 6, 1869 Oswego, New York
- Died: December 23, 1956 (aged 87) Neptune, New Jersey
- Resting place: Riverside Cemetery, Hopkinsville, Christian County, Kentucky, United States
- Spouse: Hallie Erminie Rives
- Relatives: Mary Sparkes Wheeler (mother)
- Education: Princeton University
- Occupation: Journalist; writer; diplomat

George Post Wheeler (August 6, 1869 – December 23, 1956) was an American journalist, writer and career diplomat.

== Biography ==
He was born on August 6, 1869, in Owego, New York. His parents were Rev. Henry Wheeler and Mary Sparkes Wheeler.

Wheeler was a foreign correspondent in Paris and Morocco following his graduation from Princeton University in 1891. He passed the first examinations given in 1906 for the United States Foreign Service and went on to serve as a career diplomat between 1906 and 1934.

Wheeler married the novelist Hallie Erminie Rives in 1906 in Tokyo. A wedding announcement noted that Wheeler initially considered the Kentucky-born Rives "rather severe on men" in her books and she considered him "none too charitable concerning the faults of women" in his book Reflections of a Bachelor. They met at a reception in New York and began a friendship that eventually led to marriage.

He was the second secretary of the United States legation to Japan between 1906 and 1909; served at the American Embassy in Saint Petersburg, Russia between 1906 and 1911 and at the American Embassy in Rome between 1912 and 1913. He returned to Japan as Charge d'Affairs between 1914 and 1916 and was later counselor at the American Embassy in Tokyo. He went on to serve on the American Legation in Stockholm, Sweden between 1917 and 1920; in London between 1921 and 1924; and in Rio de Janeiro in 1929. He was envoy extraordinary and minister plenipotentiary to Paraguay between 1929 and 1933 and to Albania between 1933 and 1934.

He died on Christmas Eve, December 23, 1956 at the Frances Convalescent Home in Neptune, New Jersey. His age was 87 years.

== Legacy ==
Wheeler published a number of books and short pieces over his lifetime, including works of poetry and humor, as well as collections of Russian, Albanian, and Hawaiian folklore. He also collected a number of Japanese rakugo tales to be published in a ten-volume work entitled Hō-Dan-Zō (Treasure-Tale Storehouse), but the work was never published due to the United States' entry into World War II. The manuscript now resides in the New York Public Library. He and his wife wrote Dome of Many-Coloured Glass in 1952 about their experiences serving in the United States Foreign Service.

Diplomatic posts
Preceded by Herman Bernstein	United States Ambassador to Albania; 1933–1934	Succeeded by Hugh Gladney Grant
