= Joseph Limprecht =

American diplomat (1946–2002)

9th United States Ambassador to Albania
- In office September 8, 1999 – May 19, 2002
- Preceded by: Marisa R. Lino
- Succeeded by: James Franklin Jeffrey

Personal details
- Born: July 22, 1946 Omaha, Nebraska
- Died: May 19, 2002 (aged 55) Near Peshkopi, Albania
- Education: University of Chicago; Harvard University (MPA); University of California, Berkeley (PhD)

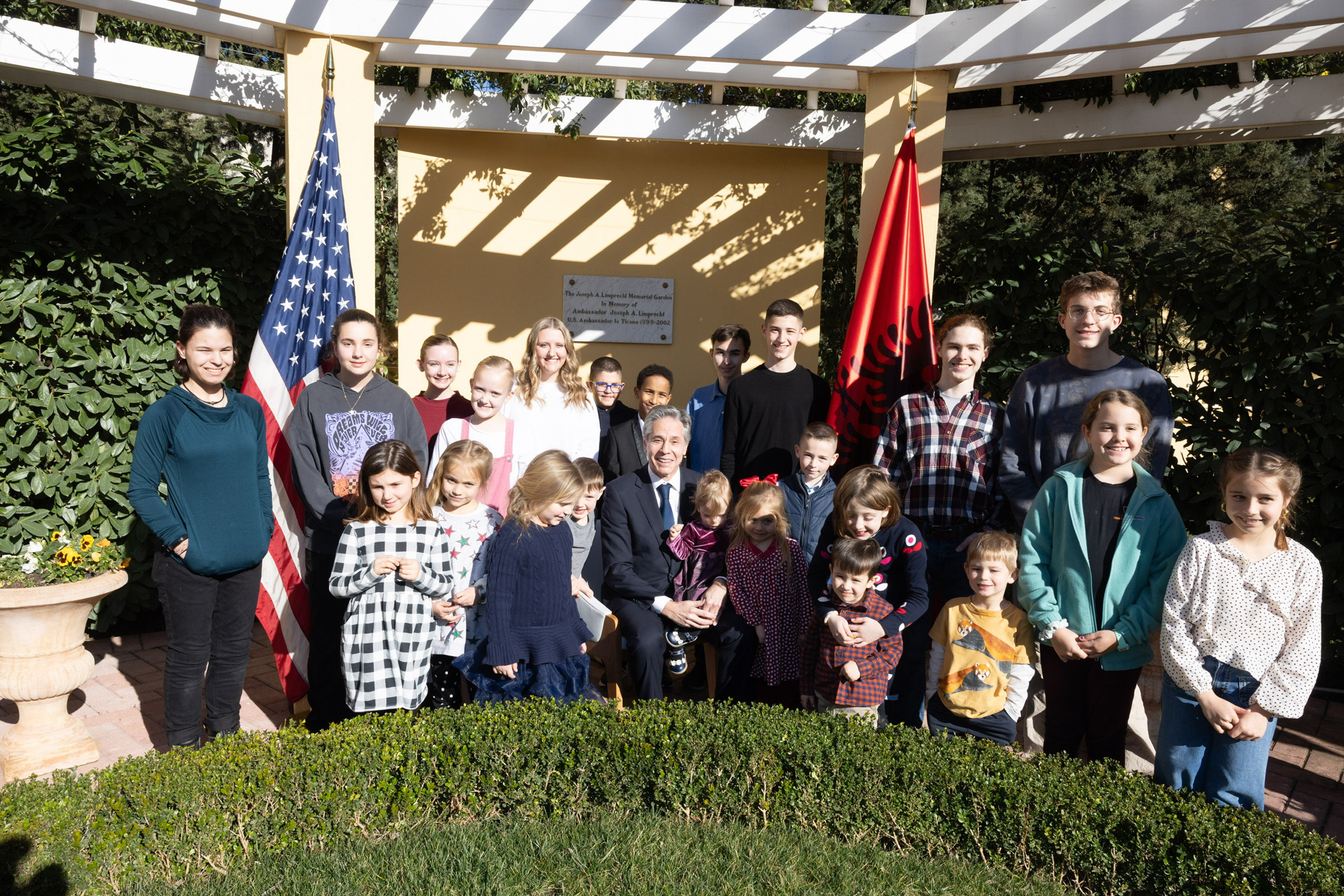
Secretary of State Antony Blinken meets embassy employees and family members in front of the memorial to Joseph Limprecht in the gardens of the U.S. Embassy in Tirana (February 2024)

Joseph Limprecht (July 22, 1946 – May 19, 2002) was an American diplomat who was a member of the Senior Foreign Service. He served as the U.S. Ambassador to Albania. Limprecht was nominated on May 12, 1999, and confirmed on July 1, 1999. He died from a heart attack at the age of 55 while visiting Lure National Park in northern Albania.

Born and raised in Omaha, Nebraska, Limprecht graduated from the University of Chicago before earning a Master's in Public Administration from Harvard University and a Ph.D. in history from the University of California, Berkeley.

== Career ==
Limprecht joined the Foreign Service in 1975. His posts included serving as public safety adviser at the U.S. mission in Berlin from 1985 to 1988 and directing anti-narcotics operations in Islamabad, Pakistan until 1991. Stateside, he was deputy director of the Office of Israel and Arab-Israeli Affairs and a division chief in State's personnel bureau. His last post before becoming Ambassador was deputy chief of mission at the U.S. Embassy in Tashkent, Uzbekistan.

== Legacy ==
The library at the Faculty of Economic Sciences at the University of Tirana in Tirana, Albania was named after him posthumously.
