= Hugh Gladney Grant =

American diplomat

Hugh G. Grant
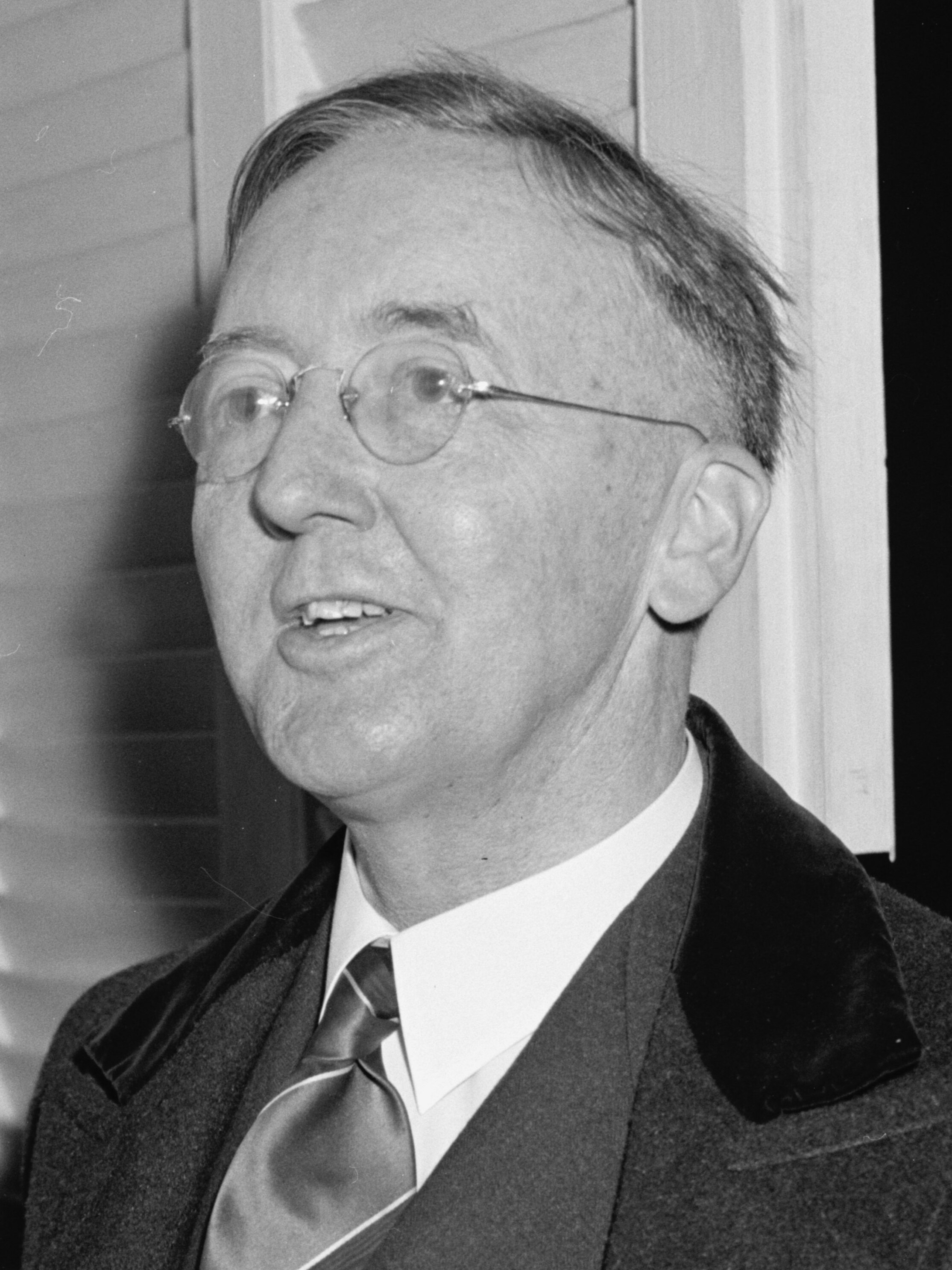

United States Minister to Siam
- In office August 20, 1940 – August 30, 1941
- President: Franklin D. Roosevelt
- Preceded by: Edwin L. Neville
- Succeeded by: Willys R. Peck

5th United States Minister to Albania
- In office November 8, 1935 – September 27, 1939
- President: Franklin D. Roosevelt
- Preceded by: Post Wheeler
- Succeeded by: William Edwin Ryerson

Personal details
- Born: September 2, 1888
- Died: August 1972 (aged 83)
- Education: Samford University

Hugh Gladney Grant (September 2, 1888 – August 1972) was an American diplomat from the state of Alabama. Grant was educated at Samford University (previously Howard College) in Homewood, Alabama. He later taught at Auburn University, (previously Alabama Polytechnic Institute), before entering government service.

== Government Service ==
From 1927 to 1933, he was secretary to Senator Hugo Black. He served as US ambassador to Albania from 1935 to 1939, during which King Zog led the Albanian government. From 1940 to 1941, he was US ambassador to Thailand.

== Writings ==
Grant published multiple books and articles, including "A war is on in America: A racial revolution involving our whole social structure" (1956).
