= Norman Hackett =

Canadian-American actor (1874–1958)

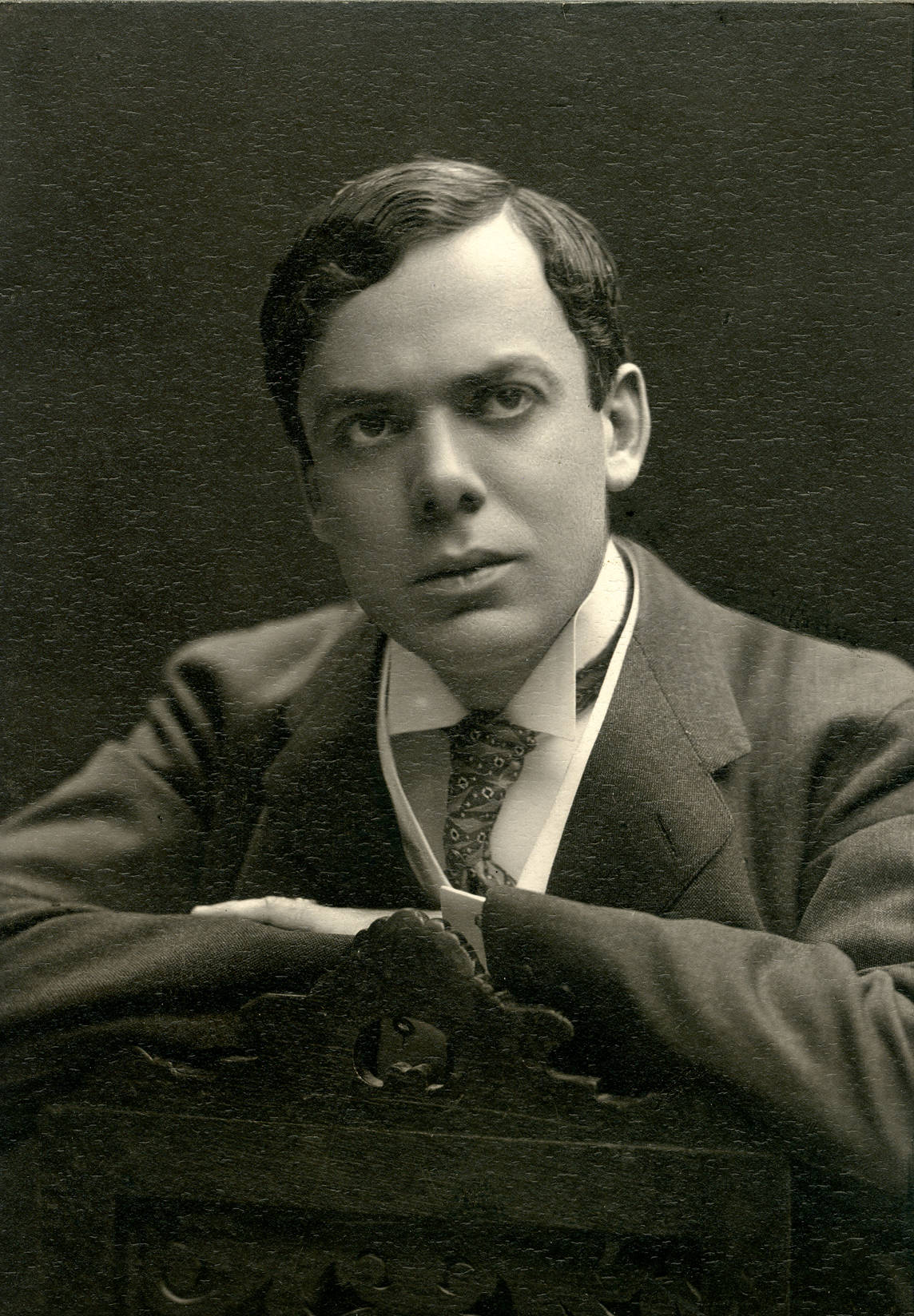
- Hackett in 1906
- Born: Norman Honore Hackett; September 7, 1874; Amherstburg, Ontario, Canada
- Died: February 12, 1959 (aged 84); Detroit, Michigan U.S.
- Occupation: Stage actor

Norman Honore Hackett (September 7, 1874 – February 12, 1959) was a prominent Canadian-born American stage actor of the early 1900s. He was particularly noted for his Shakespearean roles. After he retired as an actor, he went on to a distinguished career at the Theta Delta Chi fraternity.

== Early life ==
He was born in Amherstburg, Ontario, Canada. His father was Thomas Hackett, a Master Pilot on the Great Lakes. His mother, Christiana Honner, was also born in Amherstburg. Young Norman and his family emigrated to Detroit, Michigan, in 1882. He attended the University of Michigan in 1894, where he studied literature, especially the Elizabethan period and Shakespeare, languages and oratory, with the intent of becoming a theater critic. He was one of the founders of the Michigan Comedy Club at the University.

== Acting career ==
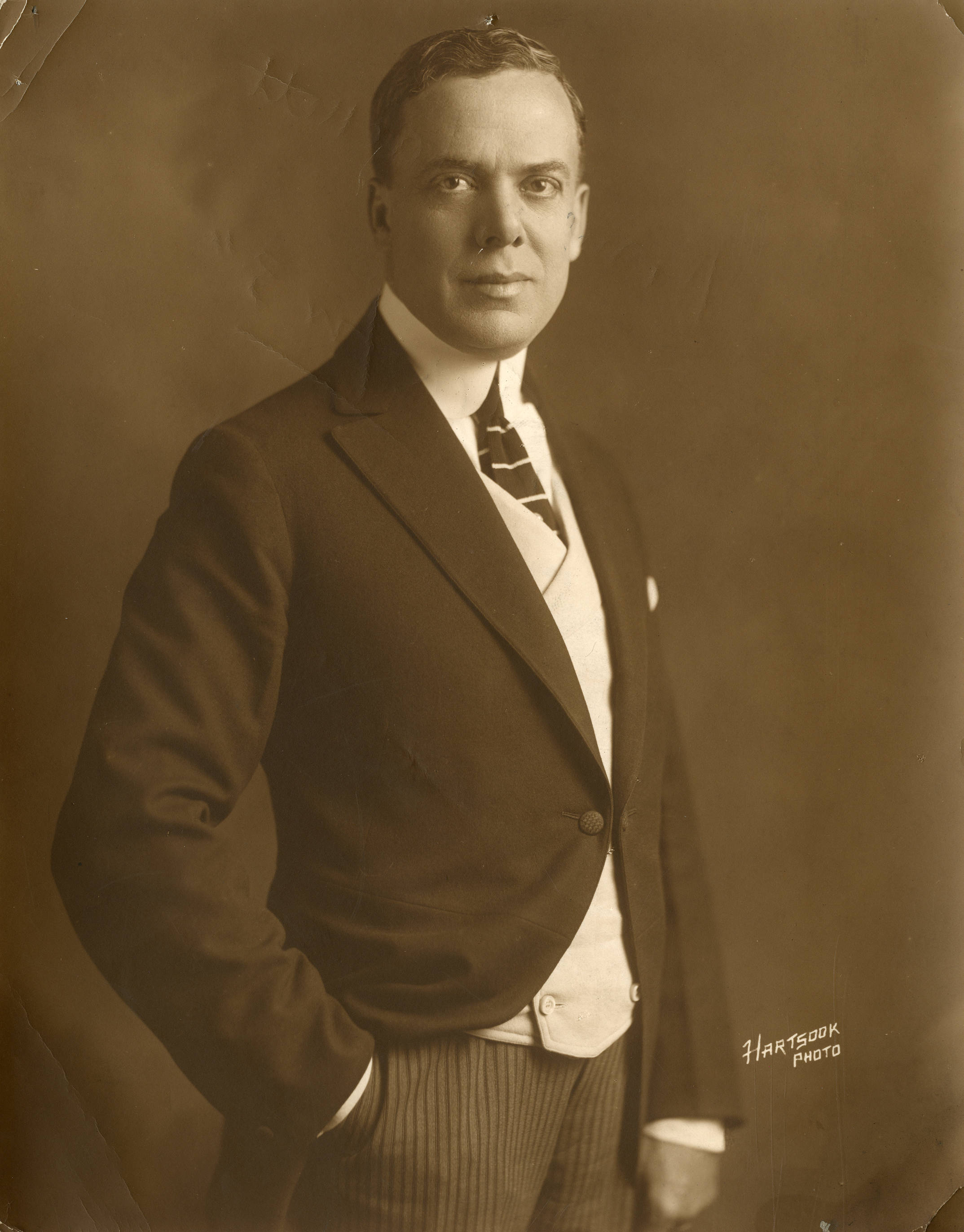
Norman Hackett in 1919

Hackett left college after his second year, joining Actress/Manager Mlle. Hortense Rhéa in her production of Josephine, written by Albert Roland Haven of Rochester NY Following three years with the company headed by Mlle. Hortense Rhea, he appeared in productions of the James-Kidder-Hanford Company for several more years. In the early 1900s, he was associated with such eminent actors as Louis James, Frederick Warde, E. H. Sothern, Julia Marlowe, Kathryn Kidder, James O'Neill (father of Eugene O'Neill), Helena Modjeska, and Robert B. Mantell.

Hackett was noted as a Shakespearean actor and lecturer, performing as Henry VIII, Macduff (Macbeth), Claudio and Horatio (Hamlet), Lysander (A Midsummer Night's Dream), Florizel (A Winter's Tale), Benvolio (Romeo and Juliet) and Cassius (Julius Caesar.)

Hackett believed that classic training was the best foundation for an actor, and he took up more modern drama for its popularity. A notable starring performance was in Satan Sanderson, produced by Stair and Nicolai at the American Theatre (St. Louis; 1911) directed by Jessie Bonstelle.

Other roles he appeared in included: Alexander the Great (under the management of Wagenhals and Kemper); Double Deceiver (1913); The Knife by Edward Sheldon (c. 1917); Classmates, by William C. DeMille; Enter Madam; Beau Brummel; and Little Shan Toy.

He also appeared in the film The Crimson Dove (1917).

In 1927, his theatrical company was caught up in the Great Mississippi Flood of that year. His last theatrical performance was in The Constant Wife with Charlotte Walker and Lou Tellegen, presented at the Lyceum Theater in Rochester NY.

== Acting philosophy ==
In an address to the Rochester Community Players on September 25, 1941, at the Sagamore Hotel, Hackett expounded on his theory of acting. He stated that Mrs. Fiske (first cousin to Robert Stevens, the managing director of the Community Players) was the pioneer of the 'ultra modern' school of acting, which considered taboo anything that "savors of exaggeration in voice or action. This striving toward naturalism has created a tendency in the profession to underplay. Motion pictures, a repressed art, have contributed to this tendency, for in them there must be no jerky movements, no grand gestures."

He went on to say "I agree that the natural school of acting is the better school, but not at the loss of getting your lines across. That's the important thing, and all the 'drawing room manner' you can command on the stage is ineffective if the audience cannot hear those cultured voices or understand those gentle gestures."

== Later years ==
Following his acting career, Hackett served as National Secretary of the Theta Delta Chi Fraternity. He is the author of the Pledge Manual of Theta Delta Chi. He has been described as 'Mr. Theta Delta Chi' and quoted as saying "Loyalty to a cause is what keeps life fine, and loyalty to your fraternity must be lived." The Theta Delta Chi Educational Foundation supports the "Norman Hackett (Gamma Deuteron 1898) Memorial Leadership Conference Center" at the Theta Delta Chi Central Fraternity Office in Boston, Massachusetts.

Norman Hackett died February 2, 1959, in Detroit from a coronary occlusion.

== Publications written by Norman Hackett ==
- Come My Boys: Memoirs Of Thirty-Four Years On The American Stage And A Lifetime In Theta Delta Chi (Hackett Memorial Publication Fund, 1960)
- The Pledge Manual of Theta Delta Chi (George Banta Publishing Co, 75th Grand Lodge;1952)
