= John L. Withers II =

American diplomat and politician (born 1948)

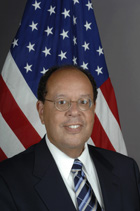

12th United States Ambassador to Albania
- In office August 25, 2007 – November 10, 2010
- President: George W. Bush; Barack Obama
- Preceded by: Marcie Berman Ries
- Succeeded by: Alexander Arvizu

Personal details
- Born: 1948 (age 77–78)

John L. Withers II (born 1948) is an American politician and diplomat.

== Biography ==
Born in 1948, Withers graduated from Harvard University in 1971 with a Bachelor's Degree in History. He earned his Master of Arts Degree in East Asian Studies from McGill University in 1975. A year after graduating from Yale University (1983), with a Doctor of Philosophy degree in Modern Chinese History, Withers began pursuing his Foreign Service career. His first posting was as a political officer at The Hague from 1985 to 1986. He later had several diplomatic postings, including in Nigeria, Russia and Ireland.

Withers was appointed Ambassador to Albania by President George W. Bush in August 2007. He was replaced by Alexander Arvizu on November 10, 2010.
