= The Three Musketeers (1916 film) =

1916 film by Charles Swickard

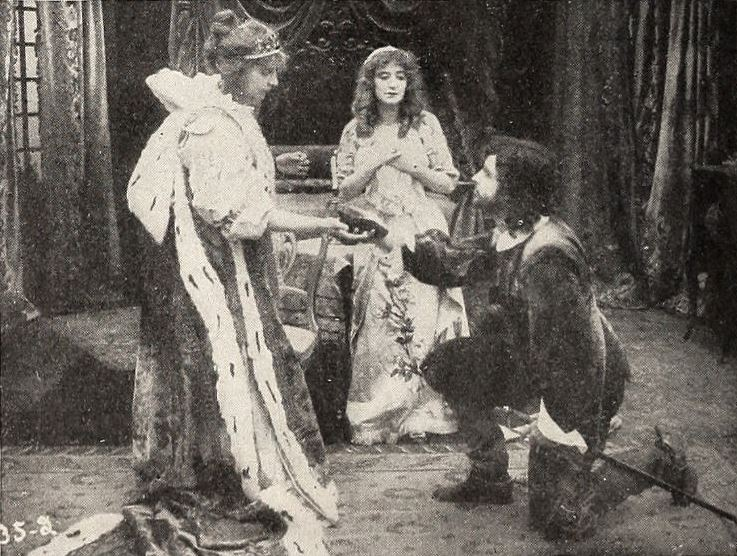
- Film still
- Directed by: Charles Swickard
- Written by: J.G. Hawks
- Based on: The Three Musketeers; 1844 novel by Alexandre Dumas
- Produced by: Thomas H. Ince
- Starring: Orrin Johnson; Dorothy Dalton; Louise Glaum
- Cinematography: Clyde De Vinna
- Music by: Wedgwood Nowell; Joseph Nurnberger; Victor Schertzinger
- Production companies: Kay-Bee Pictures; New York Motion Picture
- Distributed by: Triangle Distributing
- Release date: February 6, 1916
- Running time: 63 minutes
- Country: United States
- Language: Silent (English intertitles)

Originally released under the title D'Artagnan, The Three Musketeers is a 1916 American silent adventure film directed by Charles Swickard and starring Orrin Johnson, Dorothy Dalton, and Louise Glaum. It is an adaptation of Alexandre Dumas' 1844 novel The Three Musketeers. Prints survive of this film, with one existing in the George Eastman House.

== Plot summary ==
D’Artagnan leaves home travelling to Paris to join the Musketeers of the Guard. Although D’Artagnan is not able to join this elite corps immediately, he befriends the three most formidable musketeers of the age: Athos, Porthos and Aramis and gets involved in affairs of the state and court.

== Cast ==
- Orrin Johnson as D'Artagnan
- Dorothy Dalton as Queen Anne of Austria
- Louise Glaum as Miladi Winter (Milady de Winter)
- Harvey Clark as Duke of Buckingham
- Walt Whitman as Cardinal Richelieu
- Arthur Maude as Count de Rochefort
- George Fisher as King Louis XIII
- Rhea Mitchell as Constance Bonacieux
- Alfred Hollingsworth as Athos
- Edward Kenny as Porthos
- Claude N. Mortensen as Aramis
- J.P. Lockney as Bonacieux

== Aftermath ==
The film was re-edited and re-issued in November 1920 under the title The Three Musketeers. There was a legal battle between Triangle Pictures and United Artists over potential copyright infringement against the version starring Douglas Faribanks released in 1921 by United Artists.

== Bibliography ==
- Klossner, Michael. The Europe of 1500-1815 on Film and Television: A Worldwide Filmography of Over 2550 Works, 1895 Through 2000. McFarland & Company, 2002.
