= Marisa Lino =

American diplomat

- Education: Portland State University; M.I.T.

Marisa Lino

8th United States Ambassador to Albania
- In office September 4, 1996 – May 20, 1999
- Preceded by: Joseph Edward Lake
- Succeeded by: Joseph Limprecht

Marisa Lino is an Italian-born American retired diplomat who served as the U.S. ambassador to Albania between 1996 and 1999.

== Early life ==
She received an M.A. in international affairs from The George Washington University's Elliott School of International Affairs in 1972 and B.A. in political science from Portland State University in 1971. In May 1999, she received an honorary doctorate of international affairs from John Cabot University. She also completed a Certificate in Advanced Engineering Studies at M.I.T. in a mid-career program and did post-graduate work at the University of Zagreb (then in the former Yugoslavia).

== Career ==
Her career at the State Department included overseas postings in Albania, Italy, Pakistan, Syria, Iraq, Tunisia and Peru. She was the United States ambassador to Albania between 1996 and 1999.

After retiring from the Foreign Service, she was director of the Bologna Center of the Paul H. Nitze School of Advanced International Studies (SAIS), Johns Hopkins University, between 2003 and 2006. In 2007, she became International Affairs Advisor to Secretary Michael Chertoff at the Department of Homeland Security, and later was named Assistant Secretary for International Affairs.

Diplomatic posts
Preceded by Joseph Edward Lake	United States Ambassador to Albania; 1996–1999	Succeeded by Joseph Limprecht
