= Joseph Edward Lake =

American diplomat

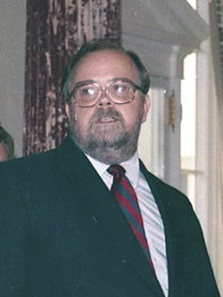

United States Ambassador to Mongolia
- In office July 5, 1994 – March 15, 1996
- President: Bill Clinton
- Preceded by: William Edwin Ryerson
- Succeeded by: Marisa R. Lino
- In office June 27, 1990 – August 30, 1993
- President: George H. W. Bush; Bill Clinton
- Preceded by: Richard Llewellyn Williams
- Succeeded by: Donald C. Johnson

7th United States Ambassador to Albania
- In office October 17, 1994 – March 15, 1996
- Preceded by: William Edwin Ryerson
- Succeeded by: Marisa R. Lino

Personal details
- Born: October 18, 1941 (age 84) Jacksonville, Texas
- Profession: Diplomat, Career Ambassador

Joseph Edward Lake (born October 18, 1941) is an American career diplomat who, in 1990, became the first resident U.S. Ambassador to the Mongolian People's Republic (the first U.S. ambassador to Mongolia, Richard L. Williams, was not a resident there). Later, he was named U.S. Ambassador to Albania (1994–1996) and then Deputy Assistant Secretary of State for Information Management (1996–1997). He is the father of late science fiction author Jay Lake.

== Career ==
Lake joined the Foreign Service in 1962. After serving in several capacities in overseas assignments in Canada, Dahomey, and China he became an analyst in the Office of Research for East Asia in the Bureau of Intelligence and Research at the Department of State from 1969 to 1971. From 1973 to 1976 he was second secretary and political officer for the U.S. Embassy in Taipei, and from 1976 to 1977 he served as a political-military officer for the Office of Philippine Affairs in the Bureau of East Asian Affairs at the Department of State.

From 1977 to 1978 he was second secretary and political officer for the U.S. Embassy in Lagos, Nigeria, and then consul and principal officer for the U.S. consulate in Kaduna, Nigeria between 1978 and 1981.

In 1982 he started his assignment as first secretary and chief of the political/economic section at the U.S. Embassy in Sofia, Bulgaria and was named deputy chief of mission in Sofia in 1984.

Between 1985 and 1986 he worked as Deputy Director of the Office of Regional Affairs for the Bureau of East Asian and Pacific Affairs at the Department of State. In 1986 he became an adviser to the U.S. delegation to the 41st United Nations General Assembly.

In 1987 Lake was named director of the Department of State's operations center.

Lake retired from the State Department in 1997 and then became Director of the Office of International Affairs for the City of Dallas (1997–2001) where he designed and managed international marketing plan to promote Dallas internationally as a business and investment center.

== Background and education ==
Lake was born in Jacksonville, Texas and graduated from Texas Christian University (B.A., 1962; M.A., 1967).

Diplomatic posts
Preceded by Richard L. Williams	U.S. Ambassador to Mongolia; 1990–1993	Succeeded by Donald C. Johnson
Preceded by William E. Ryerson	U.S. Ambassador to Albania; 1994–1996	Succeeded by Marisa R. Lino
