= Richard Llewellyn Williams =

American diplomat

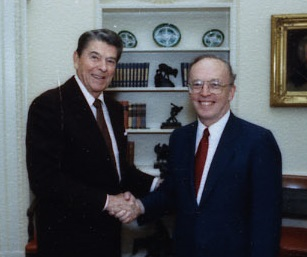

1st United States Ambassador to Mongolia
- In office 1988–1990
- President: Ronald Reagan
- Succeeded by: Joseph Edward Lake

Personal details
- Born: December 28, 1929 (age 96) Chicago
- Education: University of Chicago; Purdue University; Harvard University

Richard Llewellyn Williams (born December 28, 1929) is a former career member of the Senior Foreign Service who, over three decades as a career U.S. diplomat, opened the Consulate General of the United States, Guangzhou, the first American consulate in mainland China since the 1940s, served as the first U.S. Ambassador to the Mongolian People's Republic from 1988 to 1990 (Diplomatic relations were established with the Mongolian People's Republic in January 1987) and then was named Consul General in Hong Kong from 1990 to 1993. Williams was also director of Chinese affairs at the U.S. State Department during the Tiananmen crisis.

== Career ==
Williams was born in Chicago, Illinois, in 1929. As a child on the radio program Quiz Kids, he was "regarded by many as the best all around kid the Quiz Kids ever turned up," with particular emphasis on math and geography questions. From 1940 to 1945 in 38 cities across the United States, he and three others performed at bond rallies raising $120 million in support of the war effort; the group was featured on prominent radio shows of the day such as Jack Benny and Fred Allen, and was received by luminaries from Eleanor Roosevelt in the White House to Walt Disney in his studio.

Williams served in the United States Army, 1953–1955, detailed to the National Security Agency in its early days. He joined the Foreign Service in 1956. From 1965 to 1967 he was detailed to the White House correspondence staff. From 1968 to 1972 he was a political officer at the Consulate General of the United States, Hong Kong. Between 1972 and 1975 he served as an international relations officer for the Bureau of Intelligence and Research. He was a country officer for Fiji and Papua New Guinea at the Department of State from 1975 to 1977; and then a student at the National War College from 1977 to 1978. In addition he was Deputy Director of the Office of Micronesian Status Negotiations (1978–1979), Consul General in Guangzhou (Canton) (1979–1981) (recounted in his 2005 memoir At the Dawn of the New China), and Deputy Consul General in Hong Kong (1981–1985).

Williams was nominated by President Ronald Reagan to be the first U.S. Ambassador to the Mongolian People's Republic (MPR) on May 8, 1988. Bilateral relations with MPR had only been established a year earlier, in January 1987. Given the infrastructure challenges in Ulaanbaatar at the time, the State Department decided to accredit an Ambassador stationed in Washington. Instead of co-accrediting an ambassador from a usually larger neighboring country, as was standard practice when the State Department did not have the resources to establish a proper embassy in a particular country, the State Department decided to base Williams in Washington in order to avoid giving the Mongolians the impression that it considered them an adjunct of either Moscow or Beijing.

During this period Williams also served as Country Director of the Department of State's Office of Chinese and Mongolian Affairs, first through three years of warm Sino-American relations during which he spearheaded successful negotiations on such matters as the launching of US commercial satellites from Chinese sites. Then during the particularly tense period following the events of the Tiananmen Square protests of 1989, he provided daily briefings and policy recommendations to Secretary of State James Baker, and through the Secretary to President George H.W. Bush, while meanwhile heading a 300-person task force charged with locating and assisting Americans caught in China when the protests turned violent.

For seven years following his 1994 retirement from the Foreign Service, Williams taught graduate level China-related courses at Columbia and New York Universities.

== Education ==
Williams graduated from the University of Chicago (A.B., 1948), Purdue University (B.S., 1951), and Harvard University (M.B.A., 1953).

== Personal life ==
Williams married Jane Xuezhen Khuo on March 25, 1961. They resided in Menlo Park,CA, until her death on May 30, 2023, since which he has moved into retirement living in Oakland, CA. He has a son, Marc Williams, a daughter, Maria Williams Cypher, and three grandchildren, Eden, Elise, and Camille.

Diplomatic posts
Preceded by	U.S. Ambassador to Mongolia; 1988–1990	Succeeded by Joseph Edward Lake
