= Alexander Arvizu =

American diplomat (born 1958)

Alexander A. Arvizu
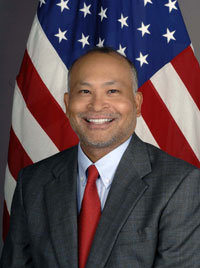

13th United States Ambassador to Albania
- In office December 6, 2010 – January 11, 2015
- President: Barack Obama
- Preceded by: John L. Withers, II
- Succeeded by: Donald Lu

Personal details
- Born: 1958 (age 67–68)
- Education: Georgetown University (BA)

Alexander A. Arvizu (born 1958) is an American diplomat who served as the United States Ambassador to Albania from 2010 to 2015.

== Early life ==
Arvizu was born on the U.S. Kadena Air Base in Japan and is a first-generation American. His father is originally from Dolores Hidalgo, Mexico and mother was from Kyoto, Japan. Arvizu grew up in Colorado Springs, Colorado, where his family settled after return to the United States. In 1980, he graduated with a bachelor's degree from Georgetown University. He has studied several Asian languages such as Japanese, Korean, Thai and Khmer.

== Political career ==
Arvizu joined the United States Foreign Service in 1981. He held various State Department positions overseas and had been domestically assigned to positions related to U.S. foreign policy in East Asia and the Pacific. While in Washington, D.C., he served as deputy director of the State Department's Office of Japanese Affairs and then Director for Asian Affairs in the United States National Security Council in the second Clinton Administration.

Among his overseas positions were Deputy Chief of Missions in US Embassy in Phnom Penh, Cambodia in 2000-2003 and US Embassy in Bangkok, Thailand in 2004–2007. In addition to that, he served two tours in Seoul, South Korea and one tour in Osaka-Kobe, Japan. From 2003 through 2004, Ambassador Arvizu was a member of the 46th Senior Seminar, a leadership program for senior government officers.

After returning from Thailand, he served as the Deputy Assistant Secretary in charge of Regional Security for Japan and Korea from 2007 through 2009. He then worked as the Director of Entry-Level Assignments in the Bureau of Human Resources.

On July 1, 2010, Arvizu was appointed U.S. Ambassador to Albania by President Barack Obama. He was sworn in as the Ambassador to Albania on November 10, 2010. He presented his credentials on December 6, 2010, and served until January 11, 2015.

Diplomatic posts
Preceded by John L. Withers, II	United States Ambassador to Albania; 2010–2015	Succeeded by Donald Lu
