= Embassy of the United States, Tirana =

American Embassy in Tirana, Albania

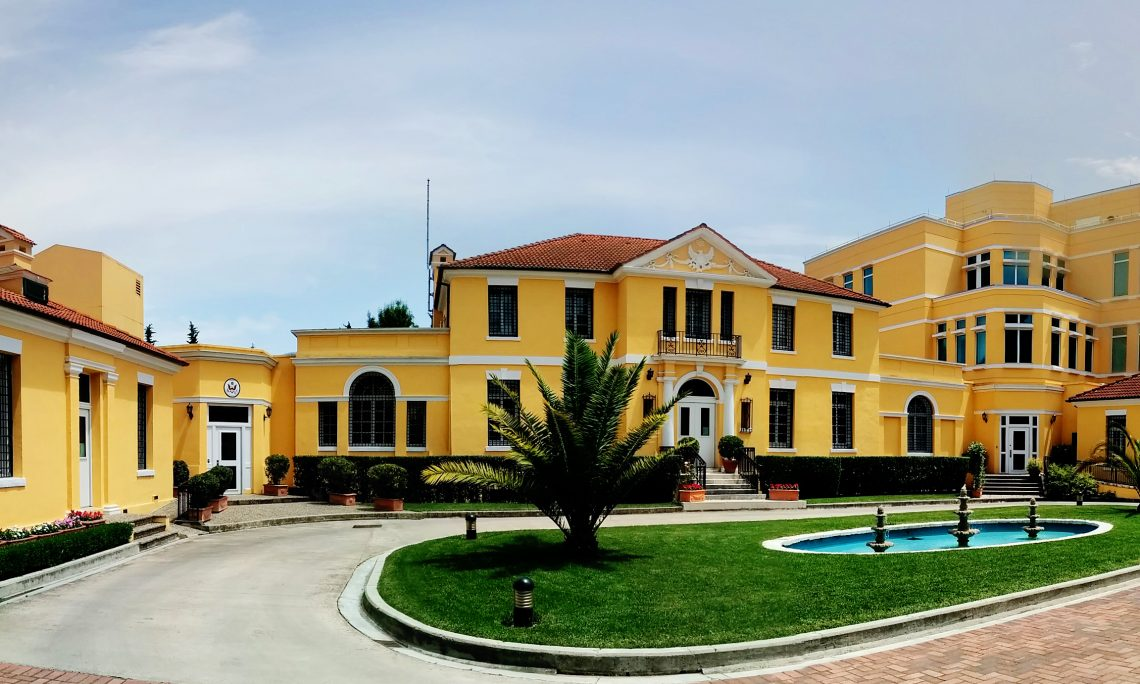
- Location: Tirana, Albania
- Address: Rruga Stavro Vinjau 14, Tirana, Albania
- Coordinates: 41°19′12″N 19°49′37″E
- Website: https://al.usembassy.gov

The Embassy of the United States in Tirana is the diplomatic mission of the United States of America in Albania.

== History ==
The United States and Albania first established diplomatic relations in 1922, when Envoy Extraordinary and Minister Plenipotentiary Ulysses Grant-Smith presented credentials to the government of Albania in Tirana on December 4, 1922. During the Italian invasion of Albania in 1939, the relations ceased. Following World War II, with Albania under a Communist regime, it became one of the most isolated nations globally. Relations with the United States were dormant until the death of Enver Hoxha and the onset of political reforms in Albania.

Diplomatic relations were reestablished on March 15, 1991. Albania received an invitation to join NATO in April 2008.

On March 15, 2008, American and Albanian munitions experts who were planning on destroying stockpiles of obsolete ammunition set off a series of explosions that caused 26 deaths. The U.S. Bureau of Alcohol, Tobacco, Firearms and Explosives (ATF) assisted in investigating the incident. In July 2022, a cyberattack targeting Albania led to the expulsion of Iranian diplomats in September of the same year. The United States, following an investigation, supported Albania's assertion that Iran was responsible for the attack.

== Architecture ==
The U.S. Embassy in Tirana is situated in an Italian colonial-style building constructed in the 1920s, originally designed as the first Department of State-built embassy structure.

== See also ==
- Albania–United States relations
- Embassy of Albania, Washington, D.C.
- List of ambassadors of the United States to Albania
- United States Ambassador to Albania
