= Yuri Kim (ambassador) =

Korean-born American diplomat (born 1972)

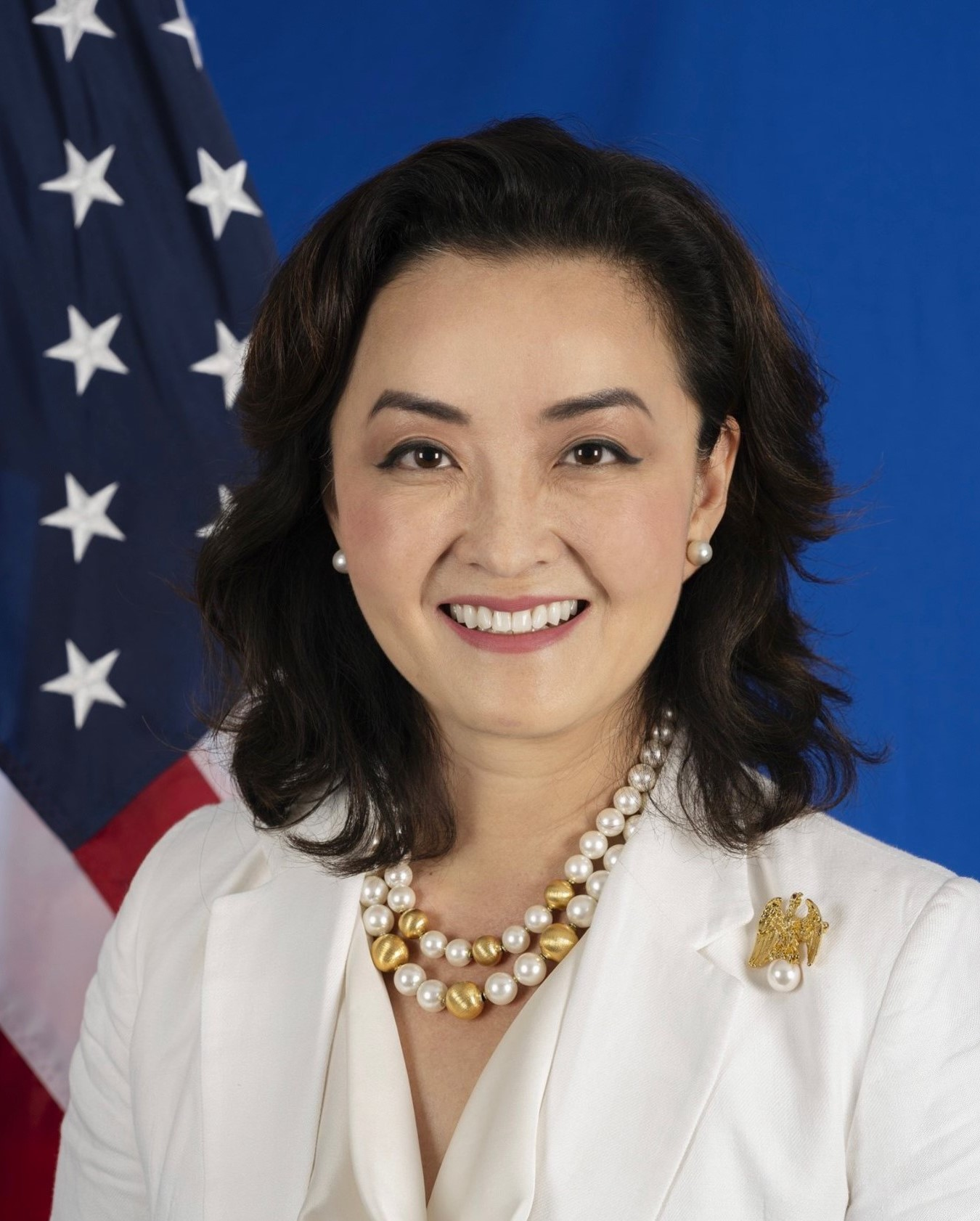

Principal Deputy Assistant Secretary of European and Eurasian Affairs
- In office July 18, 2023 – March 3, 2025
- President: Joe Biden
- Assistant Secretary: James C. O’Brien
- Succeeded by: Andrew Stowe

Acting Assistant Secretary of State for European and Eurasian Affairs
- In office July 10, 2023 – October 5, 2023
- President: Joe Biden
- Preceded by: Dereck J. Hogan (acting)
- Succeeded by: James C. O'Brien

15th United States Ambassador to Albania
- In office January 27, 2020 – June 25, 2023
- President: Donald Trump; Joe Biden
- Preceded by: Donald Lu
- Succeeded by: Eric Wendt (2026)

Personal details
- Born: c.1972 (age 53–54) Seoul, South Korea
- Education: University of Pennsylvania (BA); University of Cambridge (MPhil)
- Occupation: Diplomat

Yuri Kim (born c. 1972) is a Korean-born American former U.S. diplomat who is Senior Director for International Government Relations at ExxonMobil. She concluded her 29-year career at the State Department as Principal Deputy Assistant Secretary for Europe and Eurasian Affairs. She was the United States Ambassador to Albania 2020 - 2023. Kim is the first Korean-American woman to represent the United States as an ambassador and the first U.S. ambassador from Guam.

== Early life and education ==
Kim was born in South Korea and grew up on the Pacific Island of Guam. She earned a B.A. (in 1993) from the University of Pennsylvania and an M.Phil. from University of Cambridge. In addition to English she speaks Korean, Mandarin, Japanese, and Turkish.

== Career ==
Kim is a career member of the Senior Foreign Service with experience across Europe, Asia, and the Middle East. Kim served as the director of the State Department's Center for the Study of Diplomacy, chief of staff to the deputy secretary of state, and director of the Office of European Security and Political-Military Affairs. Kim served as the director of the Office of Southern European Affairs in the State Department's Bureau of European and Eurasian Affairs from 2018 to 2019.

Earlier in her career, Kim served as special assistant to the assistant secretary of state for East Asian and Pacific affairs and was a member of the American delegation to the Six-Party Talks focused on ending North Korea's nuclear weapons program. She was also a special assistant to Secretary of State Colin Powell.

Kim was confirmed as ambassador to Albania by a voice vote of the full Senate on December 19, 2019, and presented her credentials to Albanian president Ilir Meta in Tirana on January 27, 2020. During her diplomatic mission in Albania, Yuri Kim is supporting the growth of American investments in Albania.

== Honour ==
- Albania: Commander of the Order of Public Gratitude

== See also ==
- List of ambassadors of the United States

Diplomatic posts
Preceded by Donald Lu	United States Ambassador to Albania; 2020–2023	Vacant
