= Eric Wendt =

Retired United States Army general

- Official portrait, 2026

United States Ambassador to Albania
- Incumbent
- Assumed office September 26, 2026
- President: Donald Trump
- Preceded by: Yuri Kim (2023)

Personal details
- Born: October 7, 1964 (age 62) Berkeley, California, U.S.
- Education: University of California, Santa Barbara (BA); Naval Postgraduate School (MA)
- Awards: Defense Distinguished Service Medal; Army Distinguished Service Medal (2); Defense Superior Service Medal (3); Legion of Merit; Bronze Star Medal (3); German Gold Cross of Honour

Military service
- Allegiance: United States of America
- Branch/service: United States Army
- Years of service: 1986–2021
- Rank: Lieutenant General
- Commands: NATO Special Operations Headquarters; John F. Kennedy Special Warfare Center and School; Special Operations Command Korea

Eric P. Wendt (born October 7, 1964) is a retired United States Army lieutenant general who last served as the 5th commander of the NATO Special Operations Headquarters, departing command on January 29, 2021. As a general officer, Wendt previously served as the United States Security Coordinator for the Israel-Palestinian Authority from November 2017 to October 2019, with prior general officer terms as the chief of staff of the United States Pacific Command from May 2015 to September 2016, as the commanding general of the John F. Kennedy Special Warfare Center and School from 2014 to 2015, as the commander of Special Operations Command Korea from 2012 to 2014, and as the deputy commander of Regional Command North of the International Security Assistance Force from 2011 to 2012 in Afghanistan.

Wendt was commissioned in the Army as a second lieutenant via the ROTC program at the University of California, Santa Barbara in 1986, graduating with a B.A. degree in law and society, and later graduated from the Naval Postgraduate School with a M.A. degree in national security affairs. He retired effective March 1, 2021 after over 34 years of distinguished service, including over 4 years in the infantry and 30 years as a Special Forces Green Beret. He speaks Arabic and Korean.

President Donald Trump nominated him to be United States ambassador to Qatar on September 22, 2020, but his confirmation hearing was not scheduled before the 116th Congress permanently adjourned on January 3, 2021, so his nomination was returned without action.

Wendt was nominated by Trump to be United States ambassador to Albania on April 13, 2026.

On September 26, 2026 he assumed his post as the United States Ambassador to Albania.

Military offices
Preceded by Neil H. Tolley	Commander of Special Operations Command Korea; 2012–2014	Succeeded by E. John Deedrick
Preceded by David G. Fox	Commanding General of the John F. Kennedy Special Warfare Center and School; 2014–2015	Succeeded by James B. Linder
Preceded by John L. Dolan	Chief of Staff of the United States Pacific Command; 2015–2016	Succeeded by Kevin Schneider
Preceded by Frederick S. Rudesheim	United States Security Coordinator of the Israel-Palestinian Authority; 2017–2019	Succeeded by Mark C. Schwartz
Preceded by Colin J. Kilrain	Commander of the NATO Special Operations Headquarters; 2019–2021	Succeeded by Rob Stephenson; Acting
