= Mary Sparkes Wheeler =

American poet

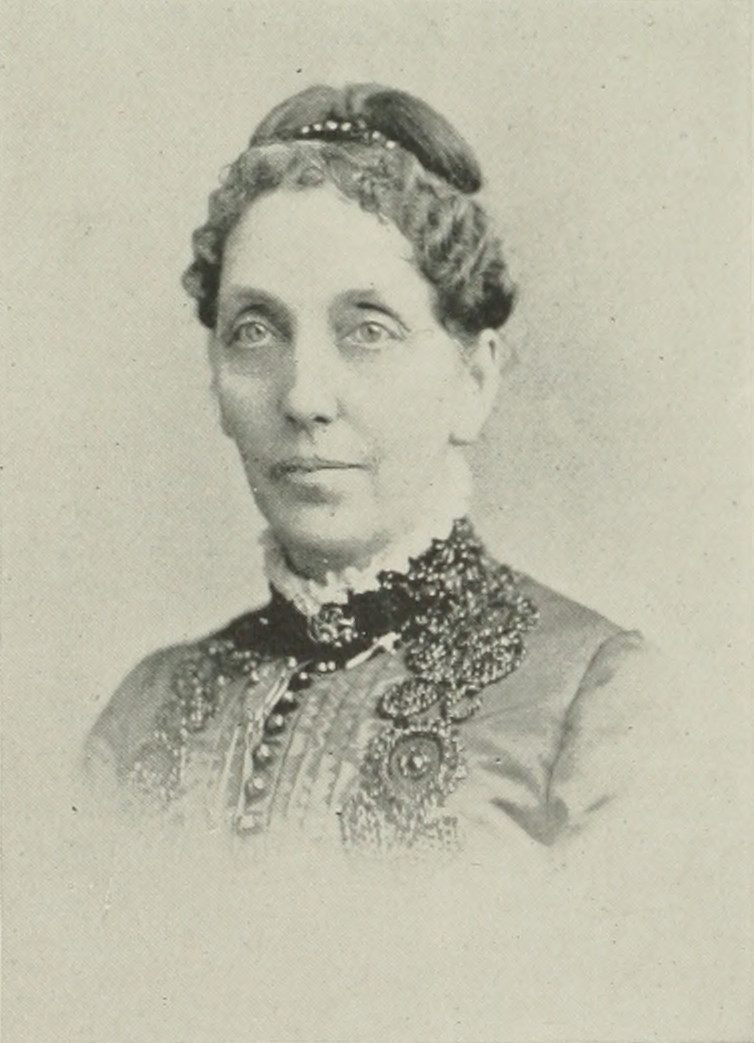
- Photo in A Woman of the Century
- Born: Mary Sparkes; 21 June 1835 near Tintern Abbey, England
- Died: January 21, 1919 (aged 83); Ocean Grove, New Jersey, U.S.
- Resting place: Spring Forest Cemetery, Binghamton, New York, U.S.
- Occupations: author; poet; lecturer
- Spouse: Henry Wheeler (m. 1858)
- Children: 7, including Mary Wheeler Newberry and G. Post Wheeler
- Relatives: Fannie Sparkes (sister)
- Writing career
- Language: English
- Genres: poetry; lyrics; non-fiction
- Subjects: religion; history; biography
- Notable works: Poems for the Fireside; Modern Cosmogony and the Bible

Mary Sparkes Wheeler (née, Sparkes; 21 June 1835 – 21 January 1919) was a British-born American author, poet, and lecturer. She wrote the lyrics to several hymns, including two well-known soldiers' decoration hymns. Her poems were set to music by Professor Sweeney, P. P. Bliss, Kirkpatrick and others. She was the author of Poems for the Fireside (1883), Modern Cosmogony and the Bible (1880), First decade of the Woman's Foreign Missionary Society of the Methodist Episcopal Church : with sketches of its missionaries (1883), As it is in Heaven (1906), and Consecration and purity, or, The will of God concerning me (1913).

== Early life and education ==
Mary Sparkes was born near Tintern Abbey, England, 21 June 1835. She was a daughter of daughter of Samuel and Elizabeth (Tratt) Sparkes. At the age of six years, she came with her parents to the United States and settled in Binghamton, New York, where her childhood and youth were spent. Her sister, Fannie Sparkes, became a missionary.

In childhood, Wheeler showed great fondness for books. In composition, she excelled, and began to write for the press at a very early age. She was educated in the public schools of Binghamton.

== Career ==
After completing her education, Wheeler became a teacher and school principal of the largest school in Binghamton until her marriage, in that city, April 13, 1858, to Rev. Henry Wheeler, of the Philadelphia Conference of the Methodist Episcopal Church. He was the author of The Memory of the Just, Methodism and the Temperance Reformation, Rays of Light in the Valley of Sorrow, Deaconesses: Ancient and Modern, and other works. For many years after her marriage, her life was mostly given to the care of her children, who were in delicate health. Of the seven born to them, two survived to adulthood: Mary Wheeler Newberry, professor of English and dean of Monnett Hall in Ohio Wesleyan University and G. Post Wheeler, secretary of the American embassy at St. Petersburg, Russia.

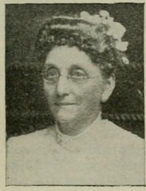
Mary Sparkes Wheeler (c. 1914)

As a Methodist author, Wheeler wrote more poetry than prose. She was the author of a volume entitled Poems for the Fireside (Cincinnati, 1888). Some of those were republished and extensively used by elocutionists, especially her "Charge of the Rum Brigade." Philip Bliss, Professors Sweeney, Kirkpatrick and others set many of her poems to music. By request of Prof. Sweeney, who composed the music, she wrote the two soldiers' decoration hymns, "Peacefully Rest" and "Scatter Love's Beautiful Garlands Above Them."

In addition to Poems for the Fireside, she was the author of two books, Modern Cosmogony and the Bible (New York City, 1880); The First Decade of the Woman's Foreign Missionary Society (New York, 1884); and was a frequent contributor to periodical literature. She served as president of the Woman's Foreign Missionary Society of Philadelphia, and national evangelist of the Woman's Christian Temperance Union (WCTU).

Wheeler served as president of the Philadelphia Society of the Methodist Episcopal churches in Pennsylvania and Delaware. For many years, she was a member of the National Lecture Bureau, Chicago, delivering lectures in all sections of the country. Wheeler spoke in many of the largest churches from Boston, Massachusetts, to Lincoln, Nebraska. She addressed large audiences in the open air in such summer resorts as Thousand Islands Park and Ocean Grove. She was appointed in 1889 as national evangelist of the Woman's Christian Temperance Union, and in 1891; superintendent of the World's WCTU Mission, in which capacity she led and preached in many evangelistic services. In 1906 she was appointed president of the Board of Managers of the Home for the Aged, located in Ocean Grove, New Jersey.

== Personal life ==
Wheeler was a lover of art, spending much time with her pencil and brush. At one time, she made her home in Philadelphia, Pennsylvania.

She died at her home at Ocean Grove, New Jersey on January 21, 1919. She was buried at Spring Forest Cemetery, in Binghamton, New York.

== Selected works ==
=== Books ===
- Modern Cosmogony and the Bible, 1880
- First decade of the Woman's Foreign Missionary Society of the Methodist Episcopal Church : with sketches of its missionaries , 1883
- Poems for the fireside : in three parts : childhood, youth, and mature age, 1883
- As it is in Heaven, 1906
- Consecration and purity, or, The will of God concerning me, 1913

=== Hymn lyrics ===
- Sing and Pray!
- Brother, Look Out o’er the Fields
- Calling for You
- He Is Able to Deliver
- Marching to Zion
- Peacefully Rest
- Scatter Love's Beautiful Garlands
- Time's Swift Chariot
- To the Uttermost
