= CompuTrac =

Technical analysis software

CompuTrac was the earliest technical analysis software originally made in 1979. The company that released it was founded by Jim Schmit and Tim Slater.
