= Orrin Johnson =

American actor

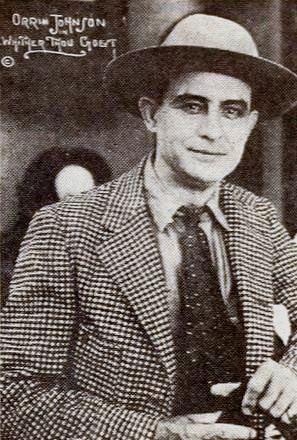
- From Whither Thou Goest (1917)
- Born: December 1, 1865; Louisville, Kentucky, U.S.
- Died: November 24, 1943 (aged 77); Neenah, Wisconsin, U.S.
- Occupation: Actor
- Years active: 1915–1917 (film)
- Spouse: Isabel B. Smith (1918 - ?)

Orrin Johnson (1865 – 1943) was an American stage actor. He also appeared in seven films during the silent era.

Johnson was born on December 1, 1865, in Louisville, Kentucky. His professional theatrical debut came in Hazel Kirke. His performances on Broadway began with his portrayal of Edward Seabury in Men and Women (1890) and ended when he played George Lorrimer in Ostriches (1925).

Johnson married Isabel B. Smith, a widow, on June 16, 1918, in Neenah, Wisconsin. He died on November 24, 1943, at his home in Neenah, aged 77.

== Selected filmography ==
- Satan Sanderson (1915)
- The Penitentes (1915)
- The Light at Dusk (1916)
- The Three Musketeers (1916)

== Bibliography ==
- Davis, Ronald L. William S. Hart: Projecting the American West. University of Oklahoma Press, 2003.
