= List of Kamala Harris 2024 presidential campaign federal executive officials endorsements =

This is a list of notable federal executive officials that endorsed the Kamala Harris 2024 presidential campaign.

== Federal executive officials ==
Four out of the six living presidents endorsed Harris. Former president Donald Trump is the Republican nominee, while George W. Bush declined to endorse a candidate, as he is "retired from presidential politics".

Three out of the five living vice presidents besides Harris herself have endorsed her. Biden was also the outgoing incumbent president. Mike Pence, who served under Trump, had said he would not endorse either candidate, while fellow Republican Dan Quayle did not publicly weigh in on the race, though post-election, he stated he voted for Donald Trump.

Joe Biden

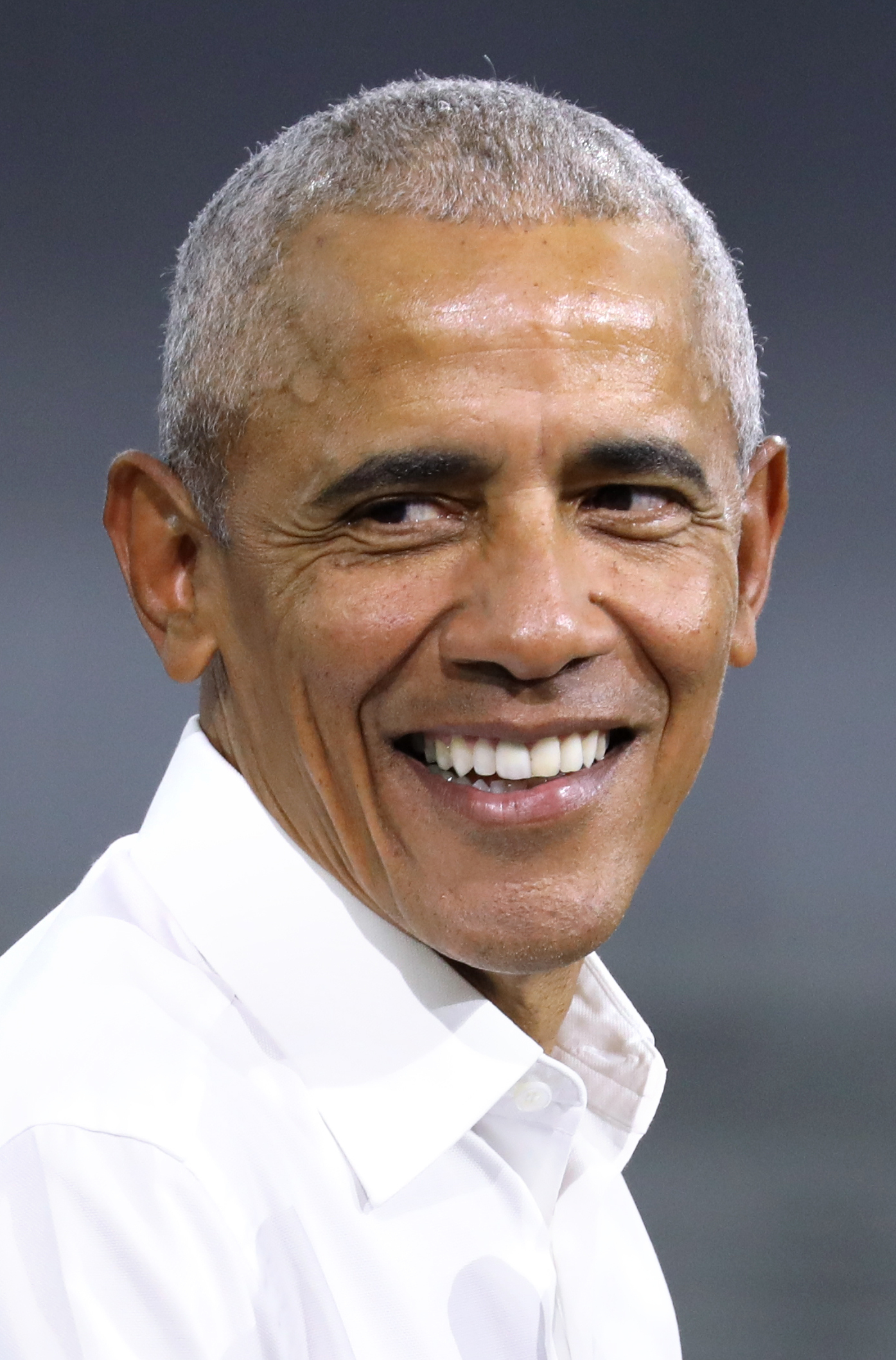
Barack Obama

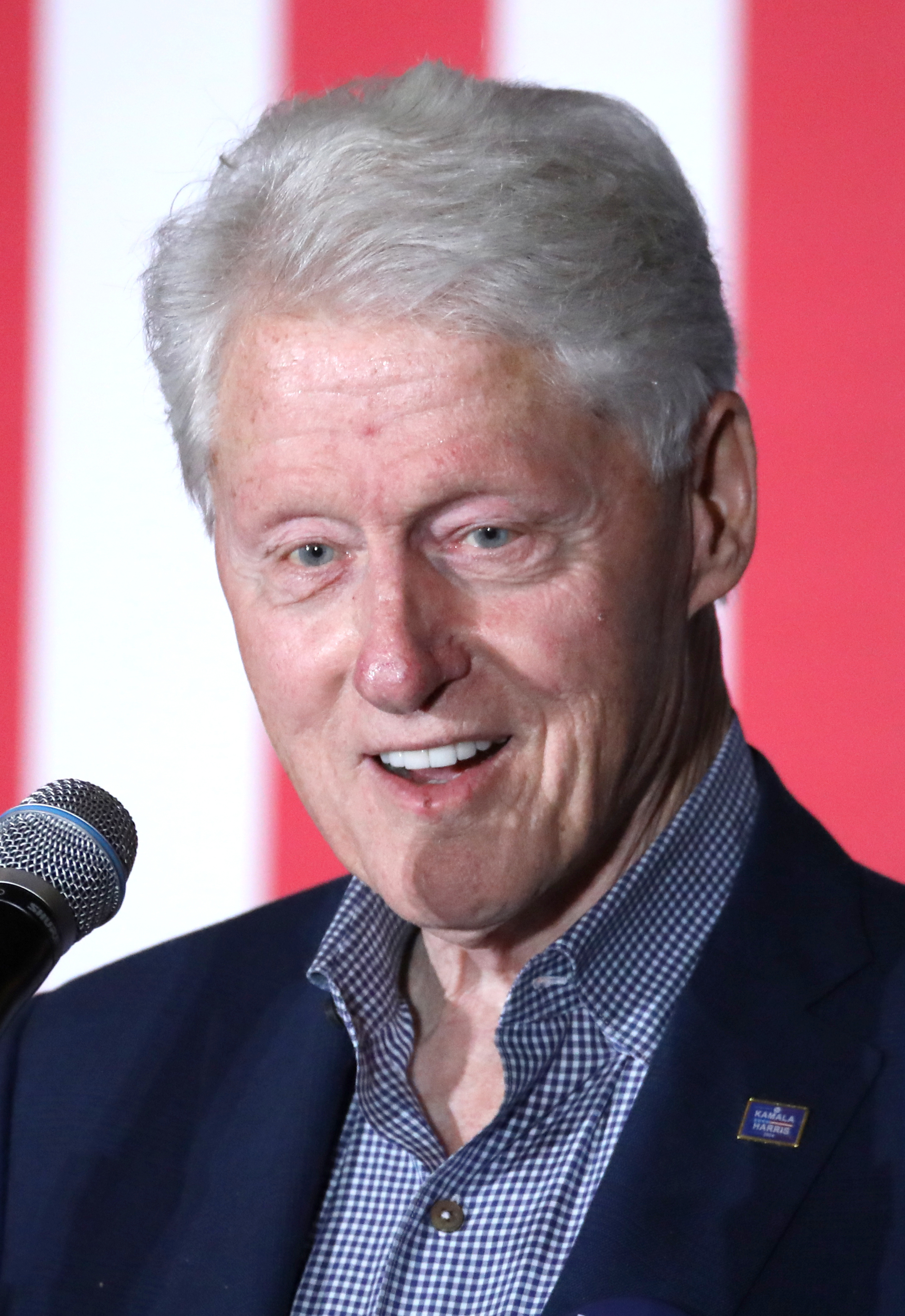
Bill Clinton

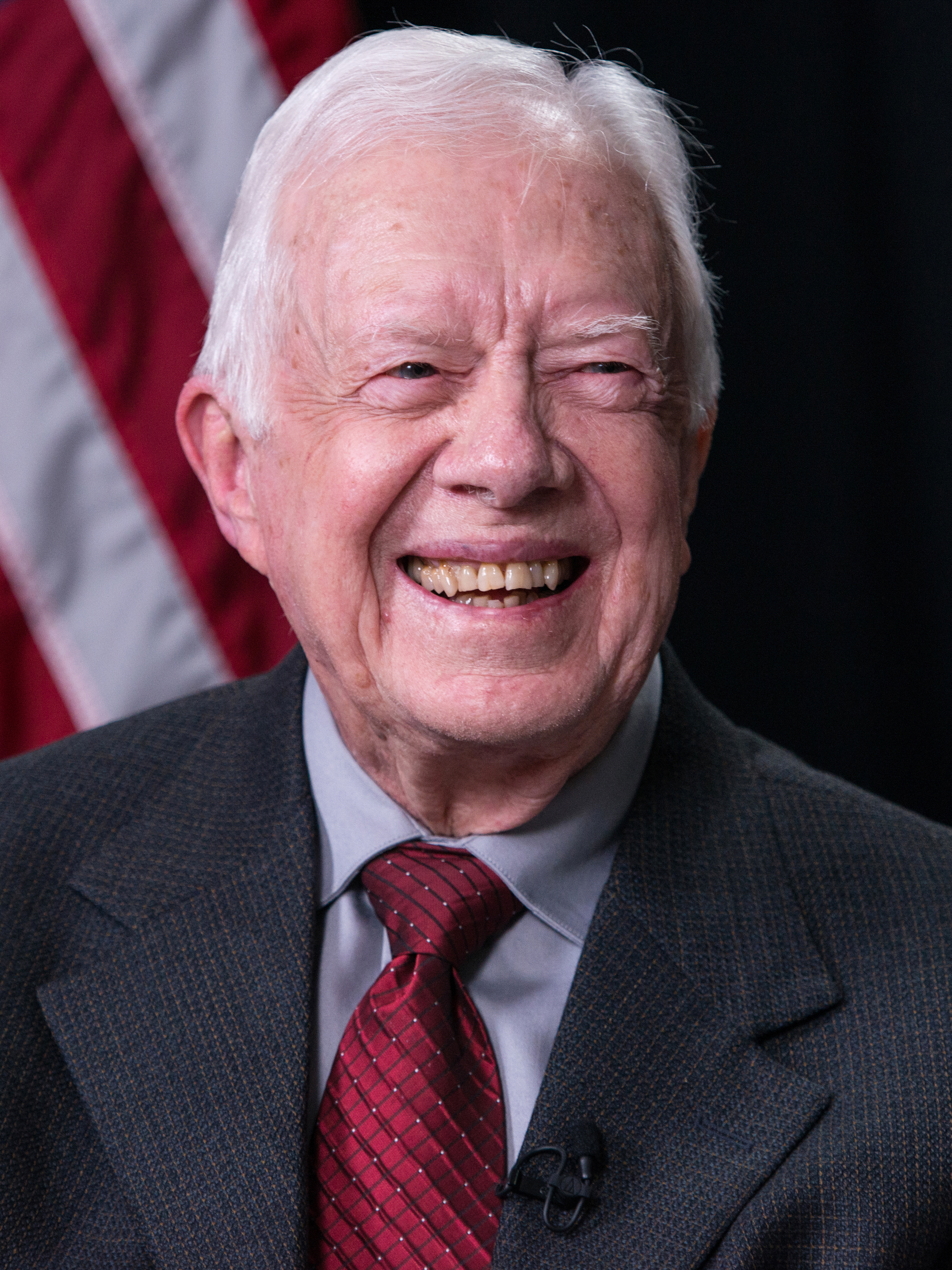
Jimmy Carter

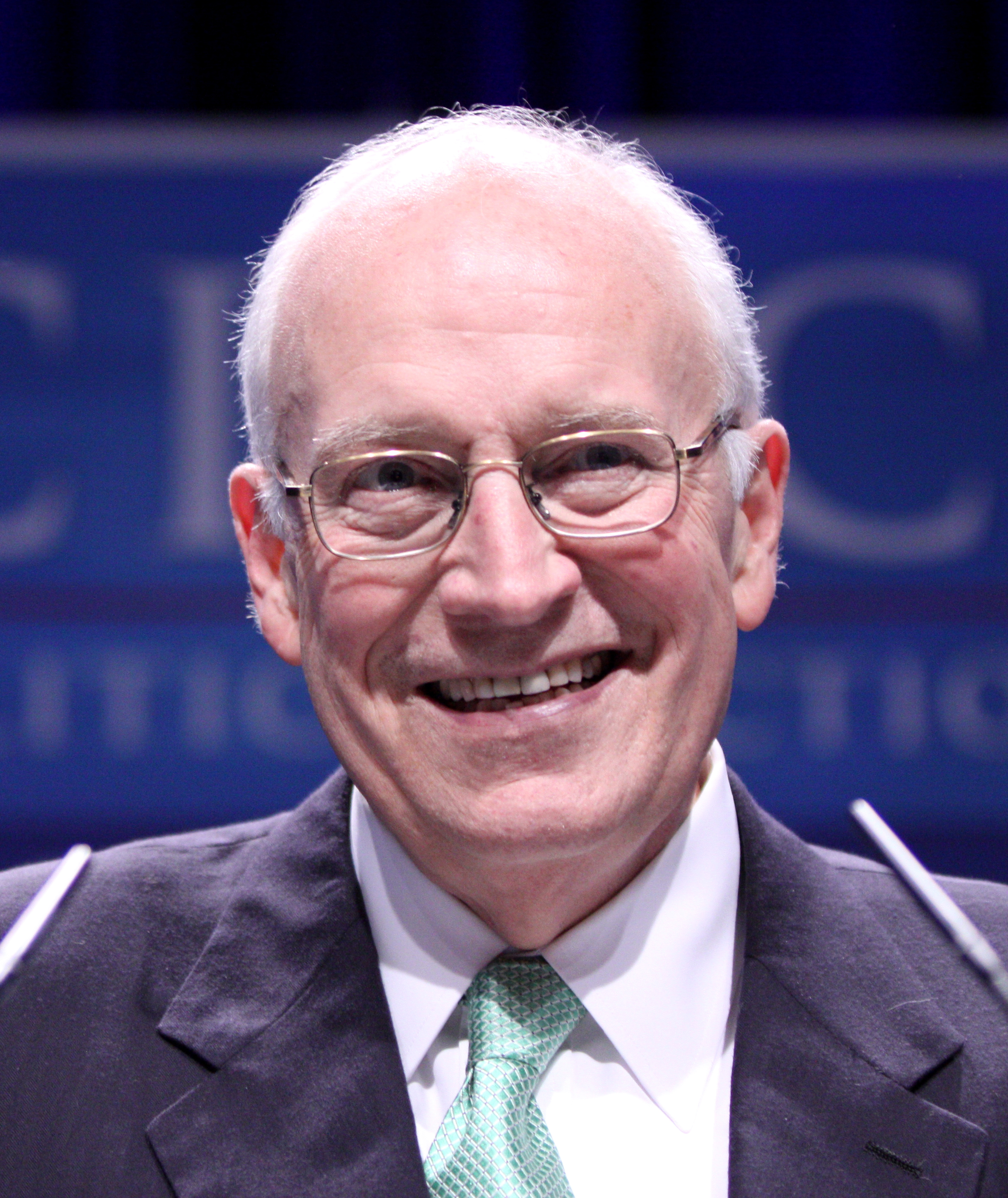
Dick Cheney

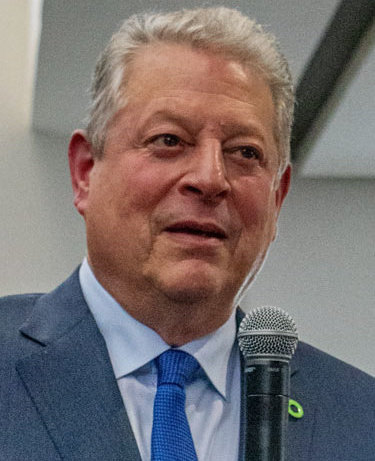
Al Gore

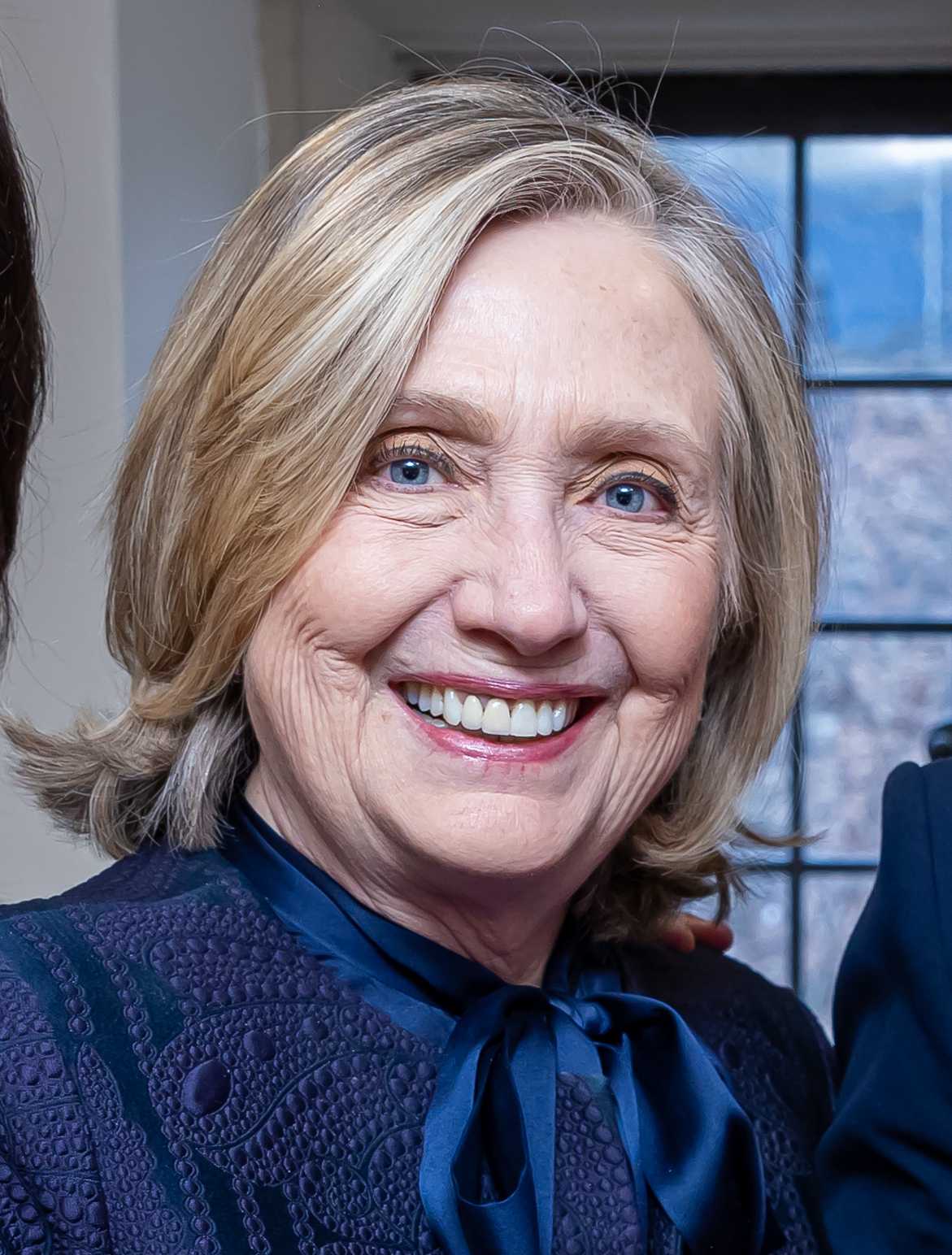
Hillary Clinton

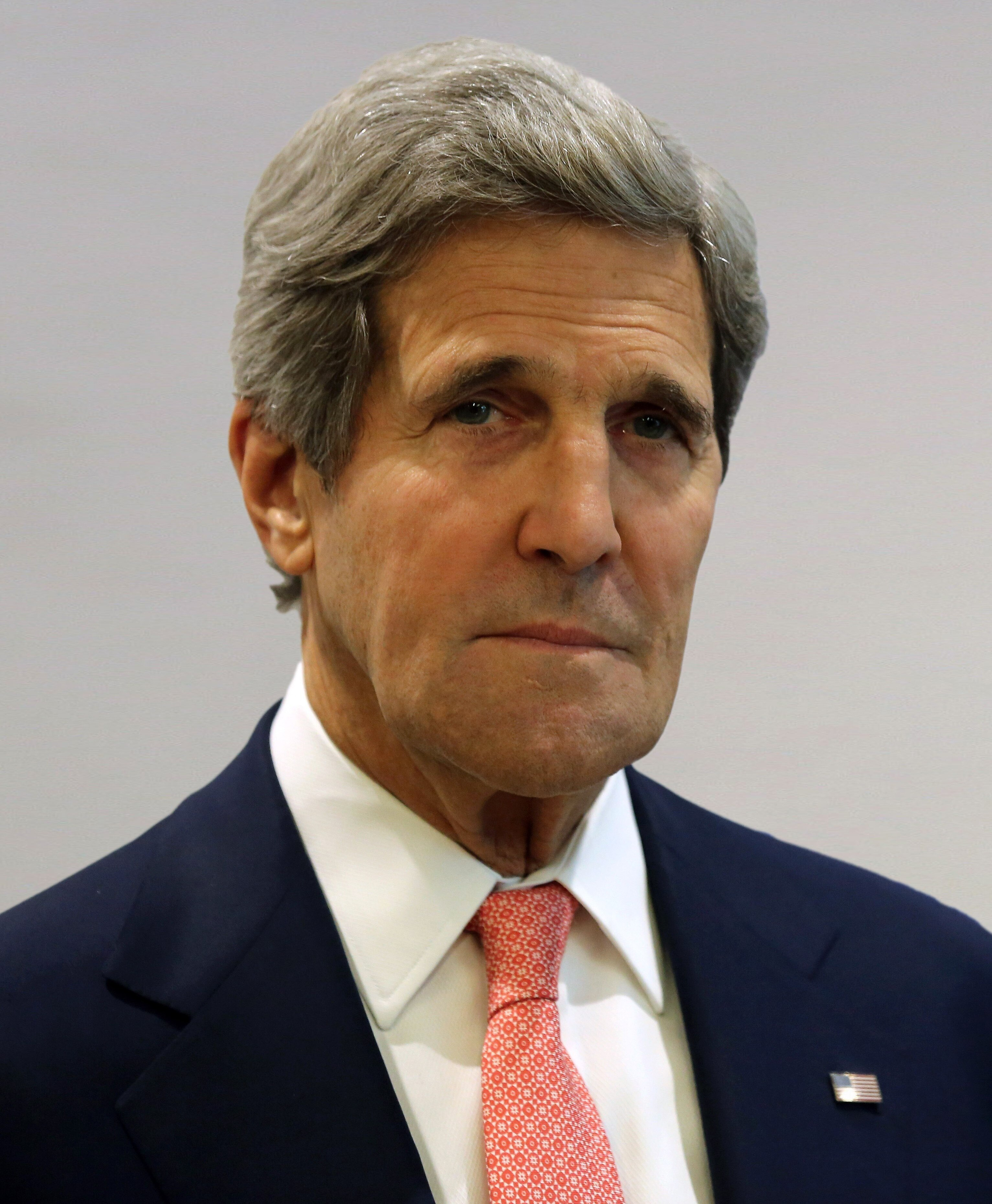
John Kerry

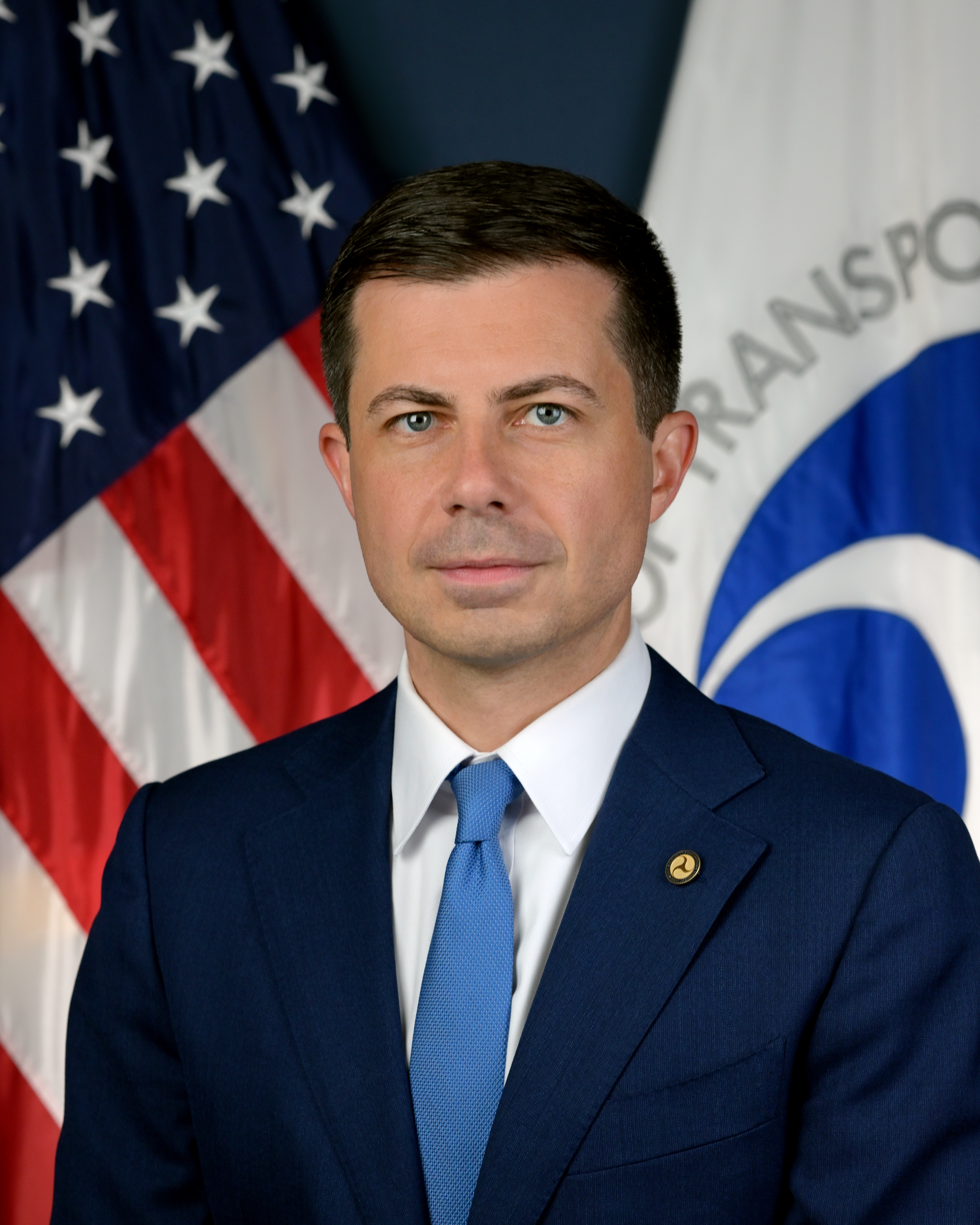
Pete Buttigieg

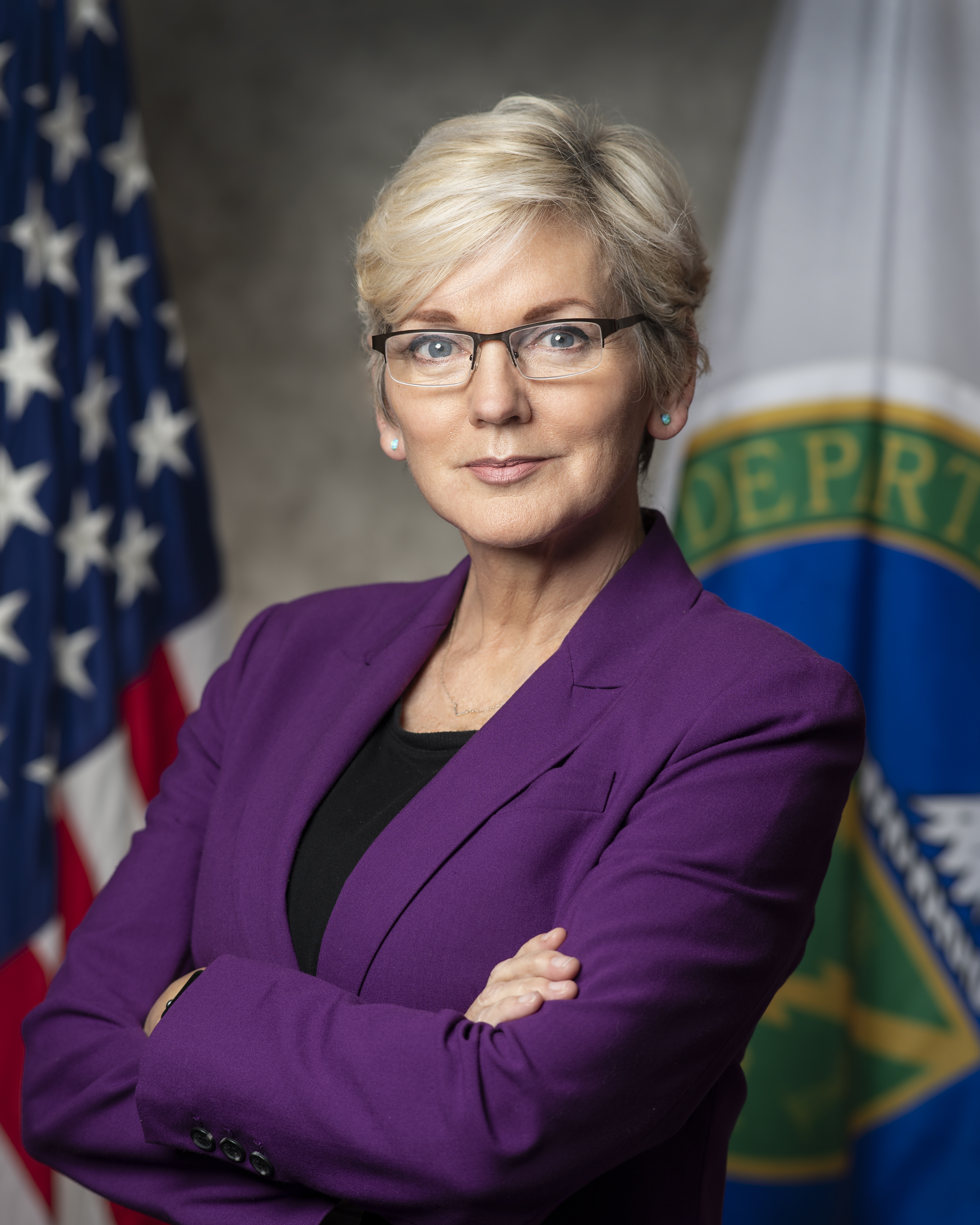
Jennifer Granholm

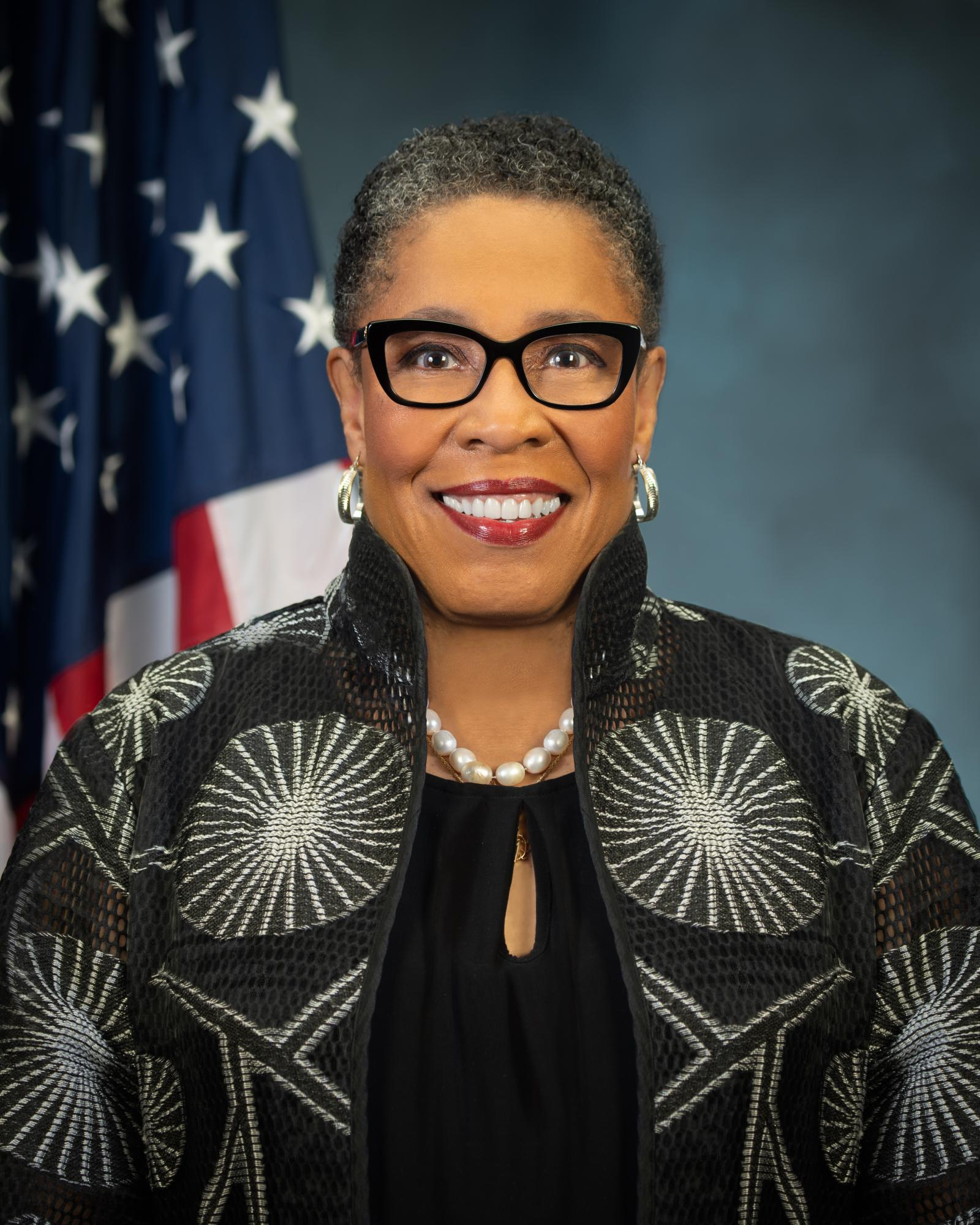
Marcia Fudge

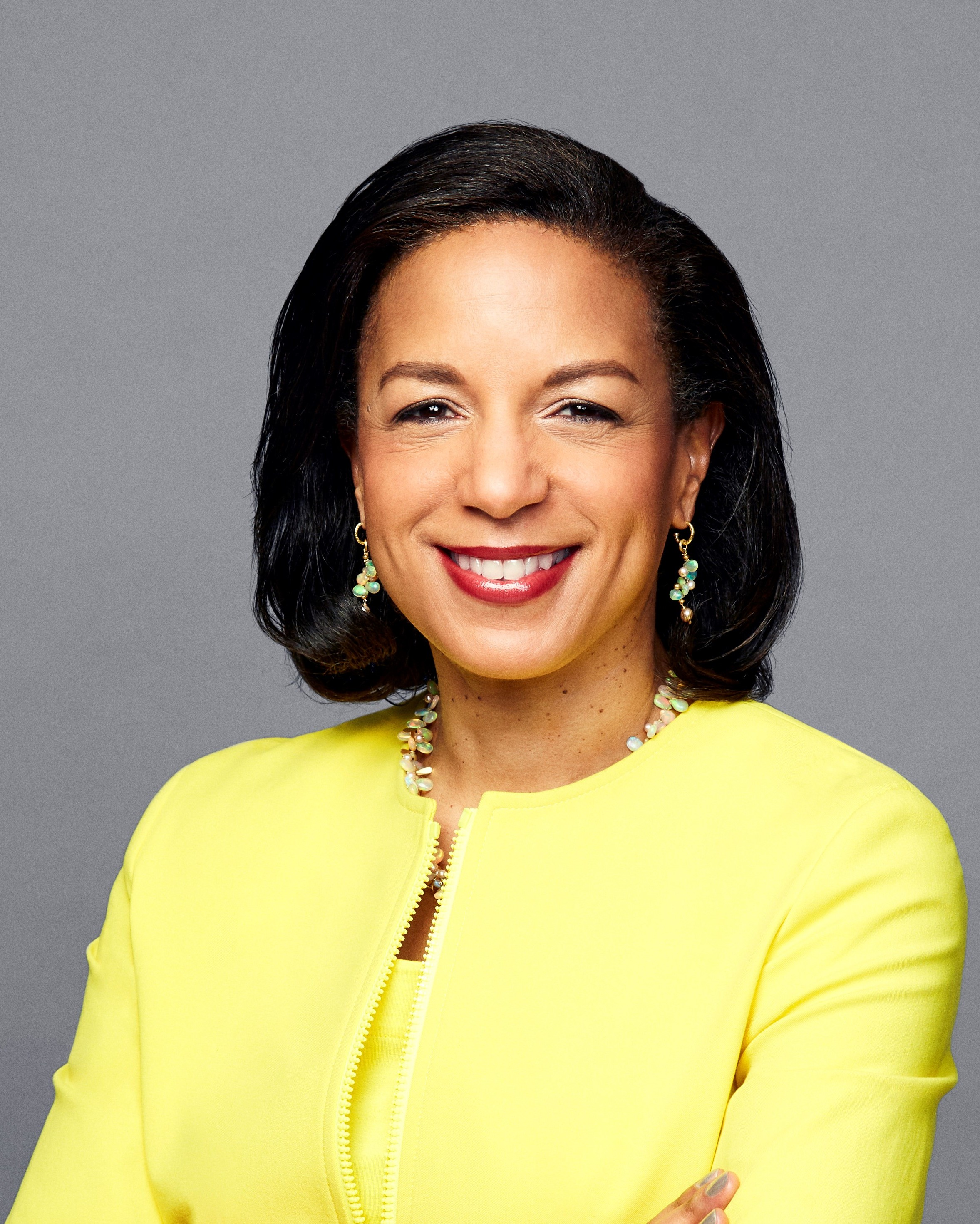
Susan Rice

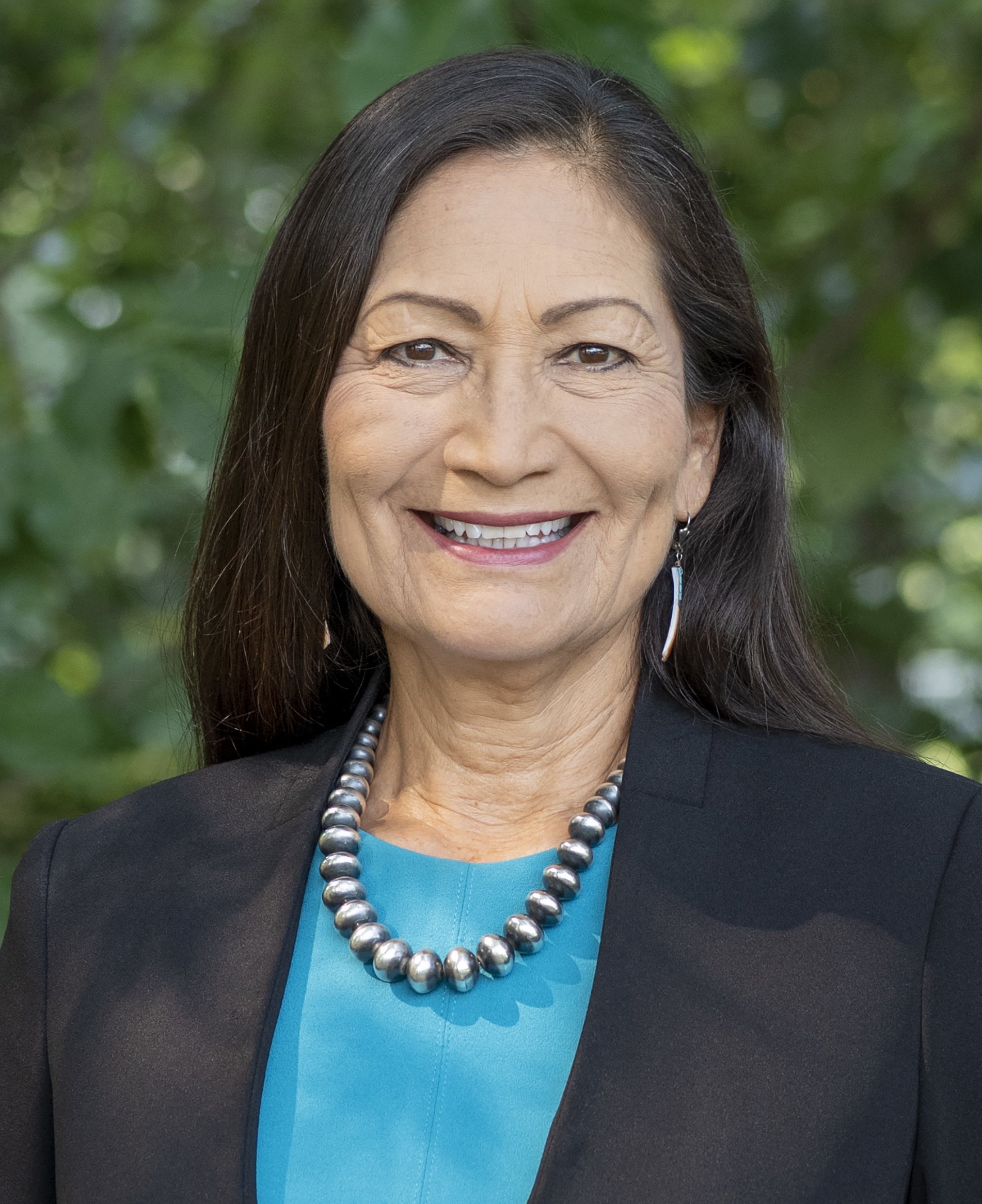
Deb Haaland

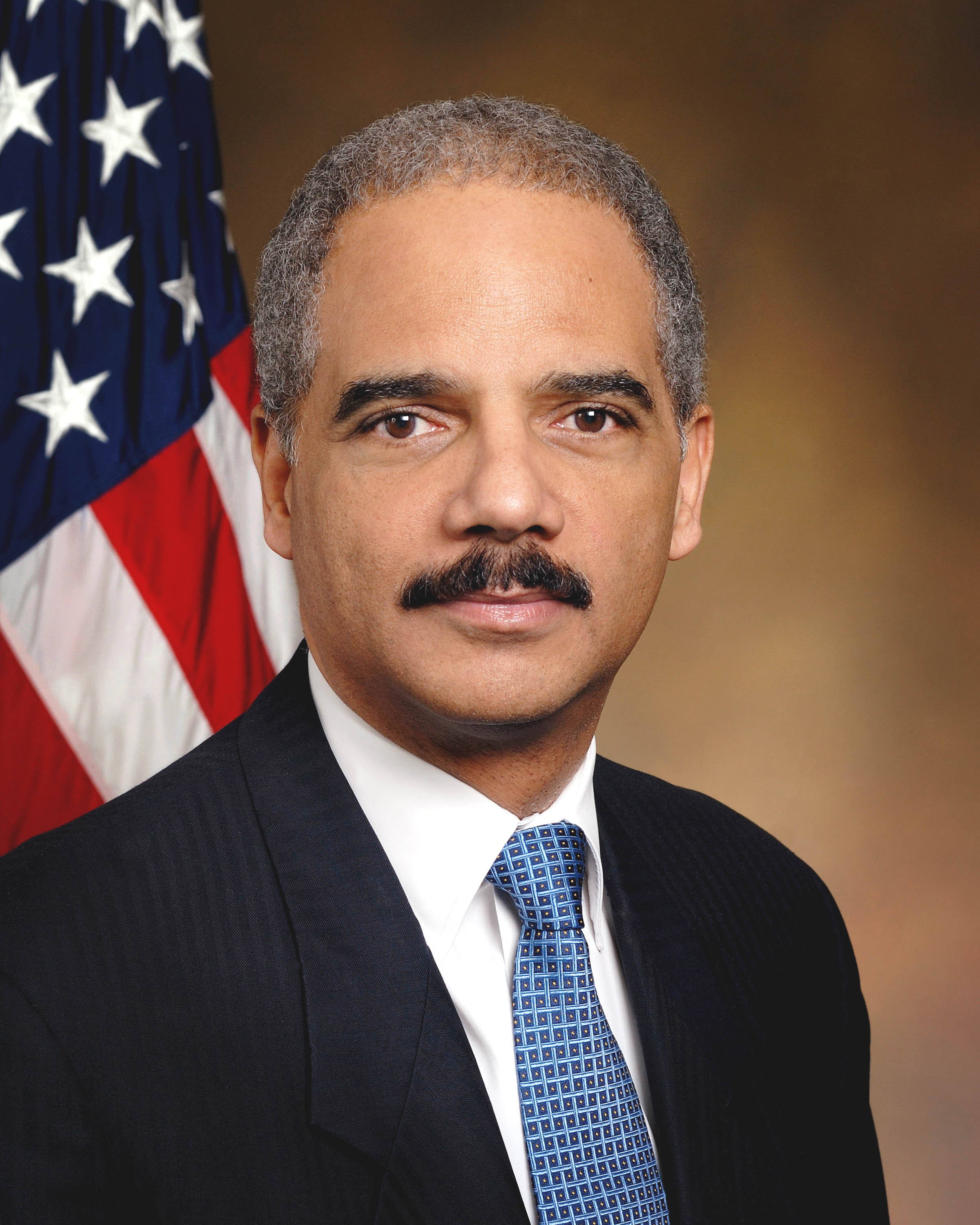
Eric Holder

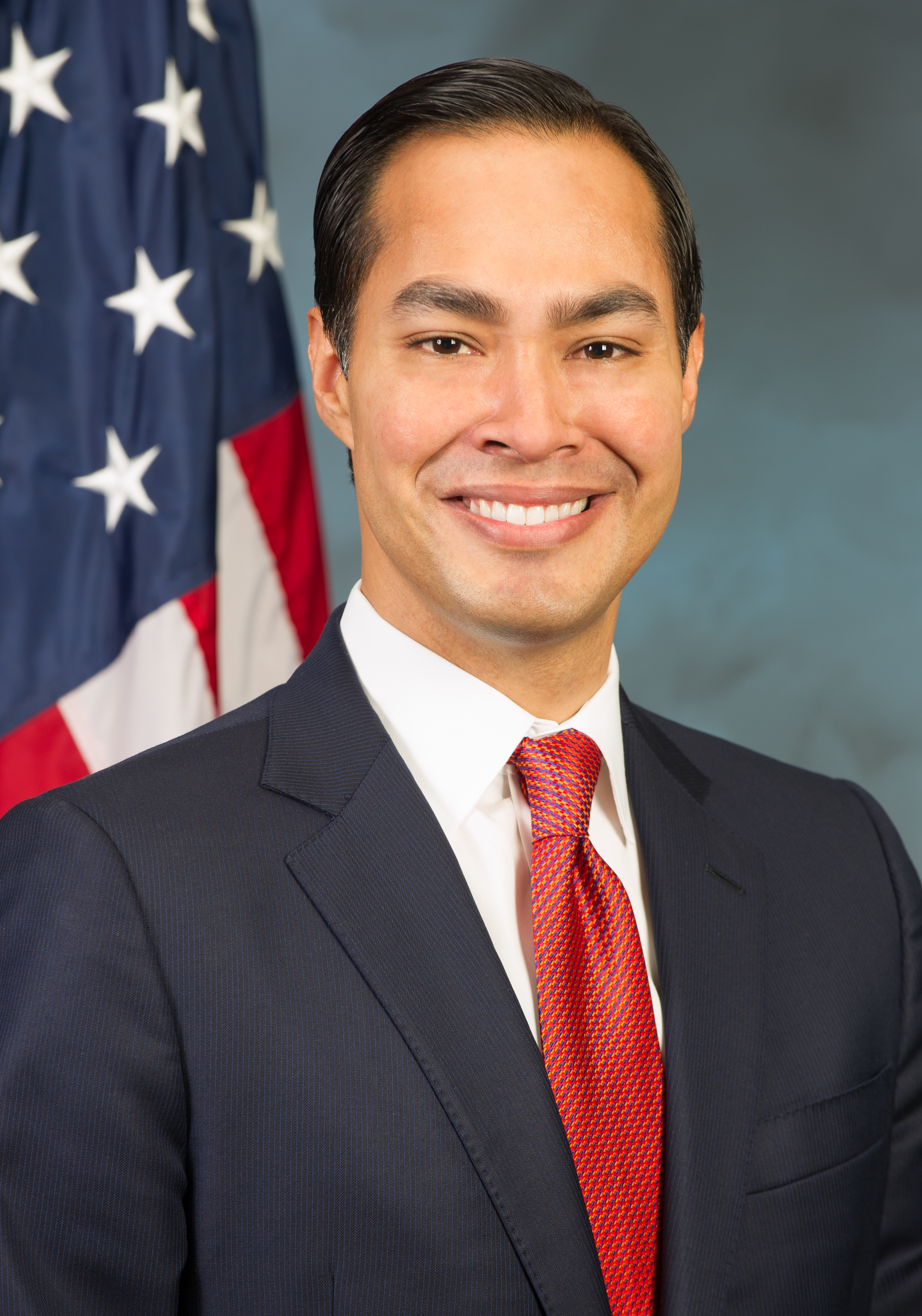
Julian Castro

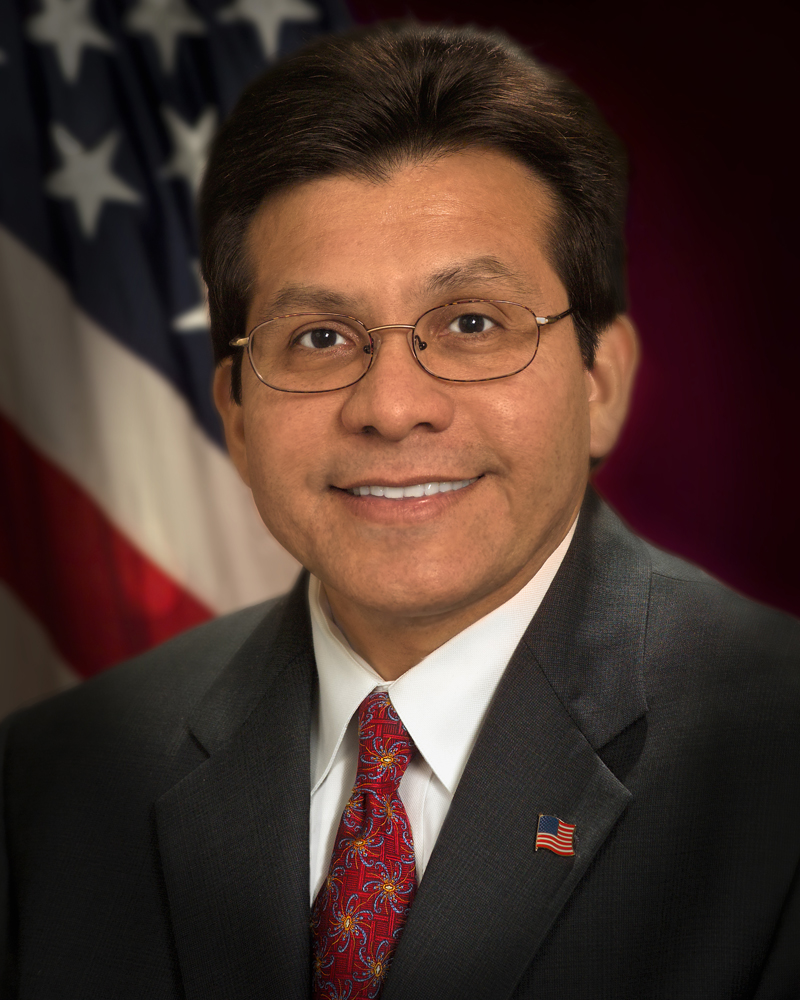
Alberto Gonzales

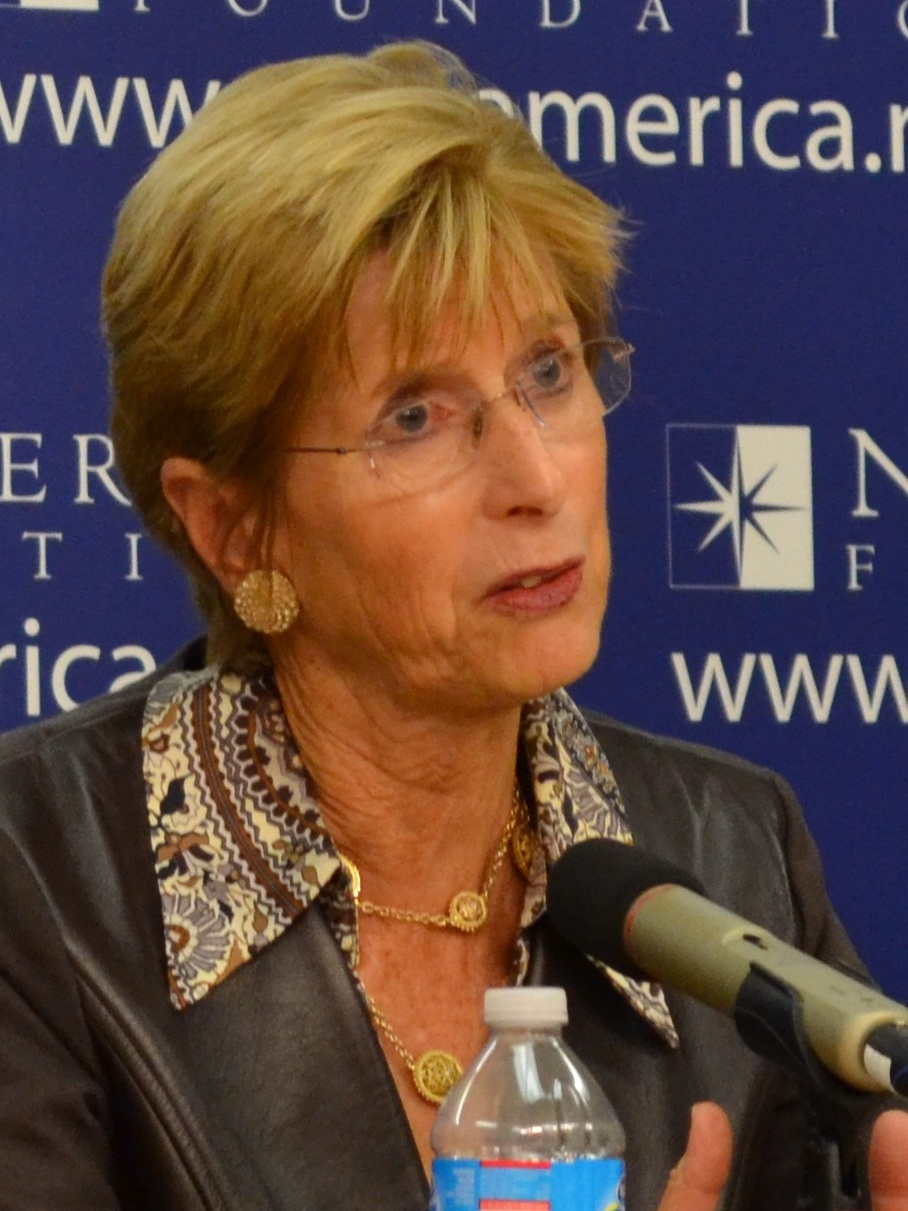
Christine Todd Whitman

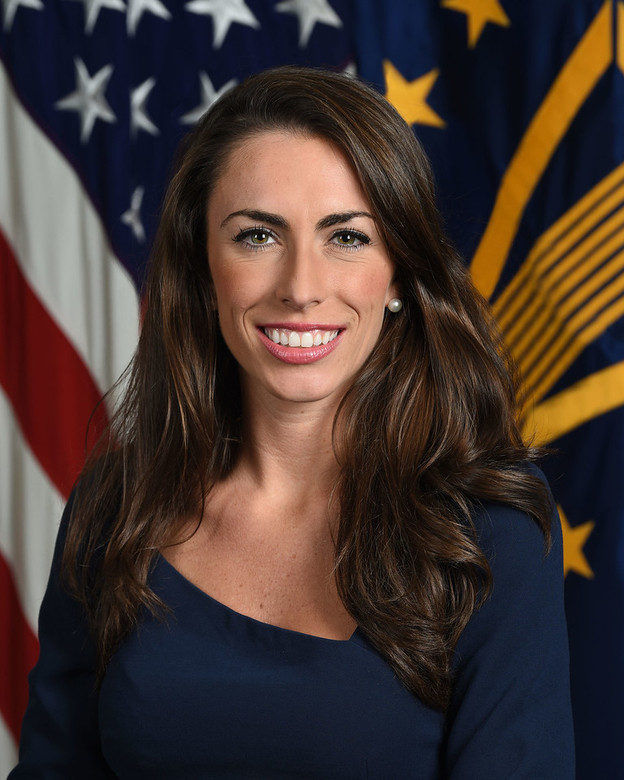
Alyssa Farah Griffin

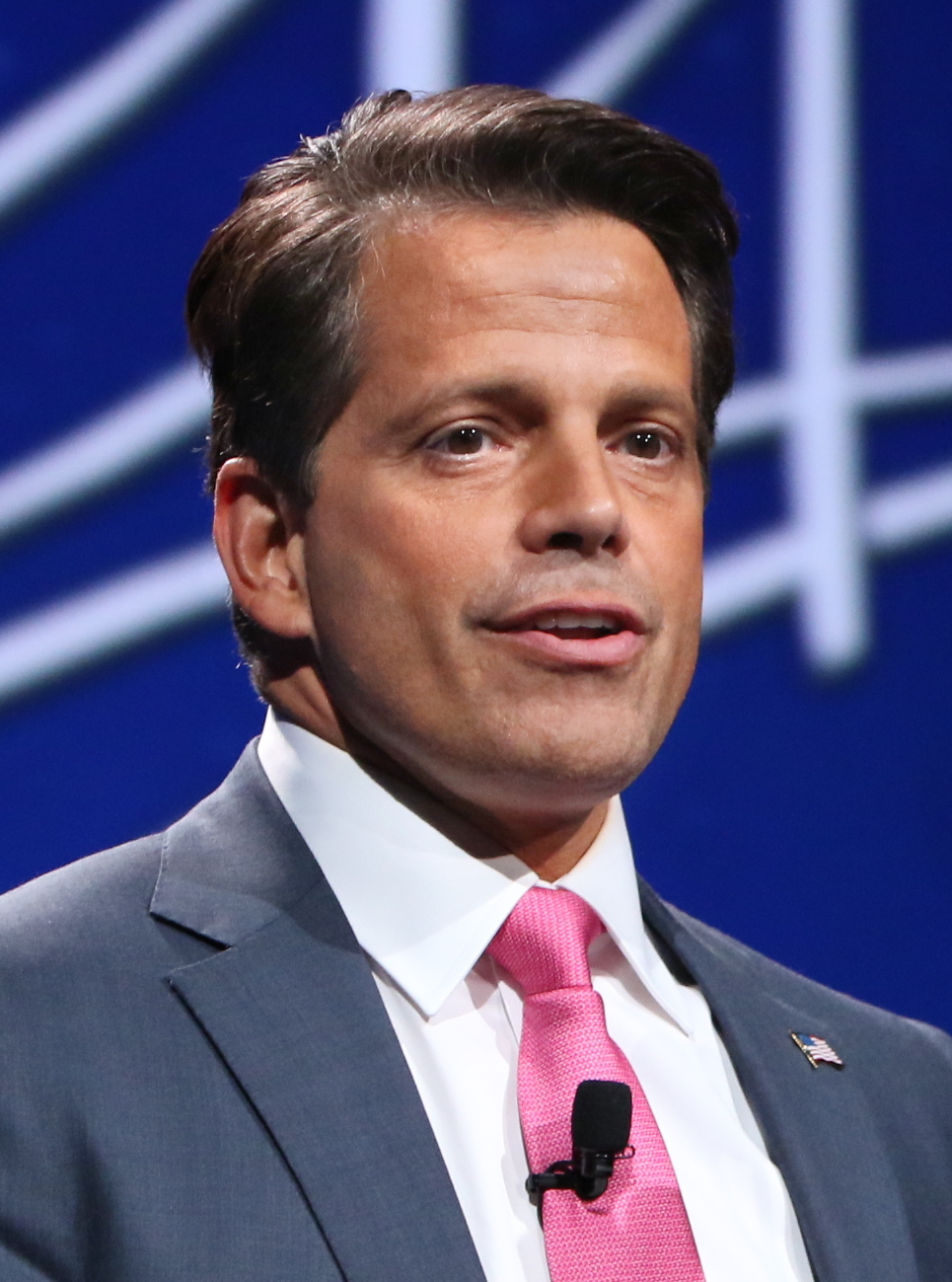
Anthony Scaramucci

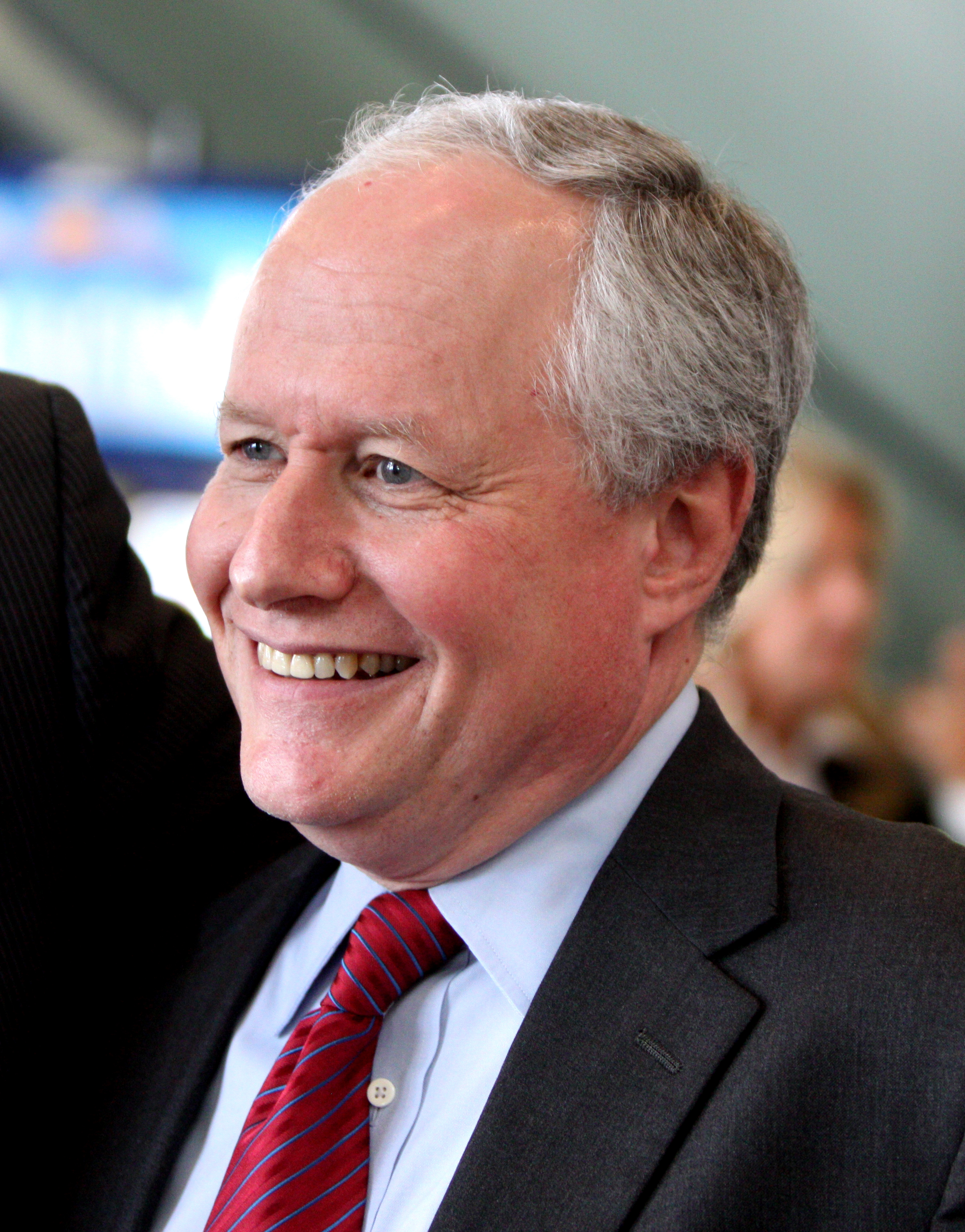
Bill Kristol

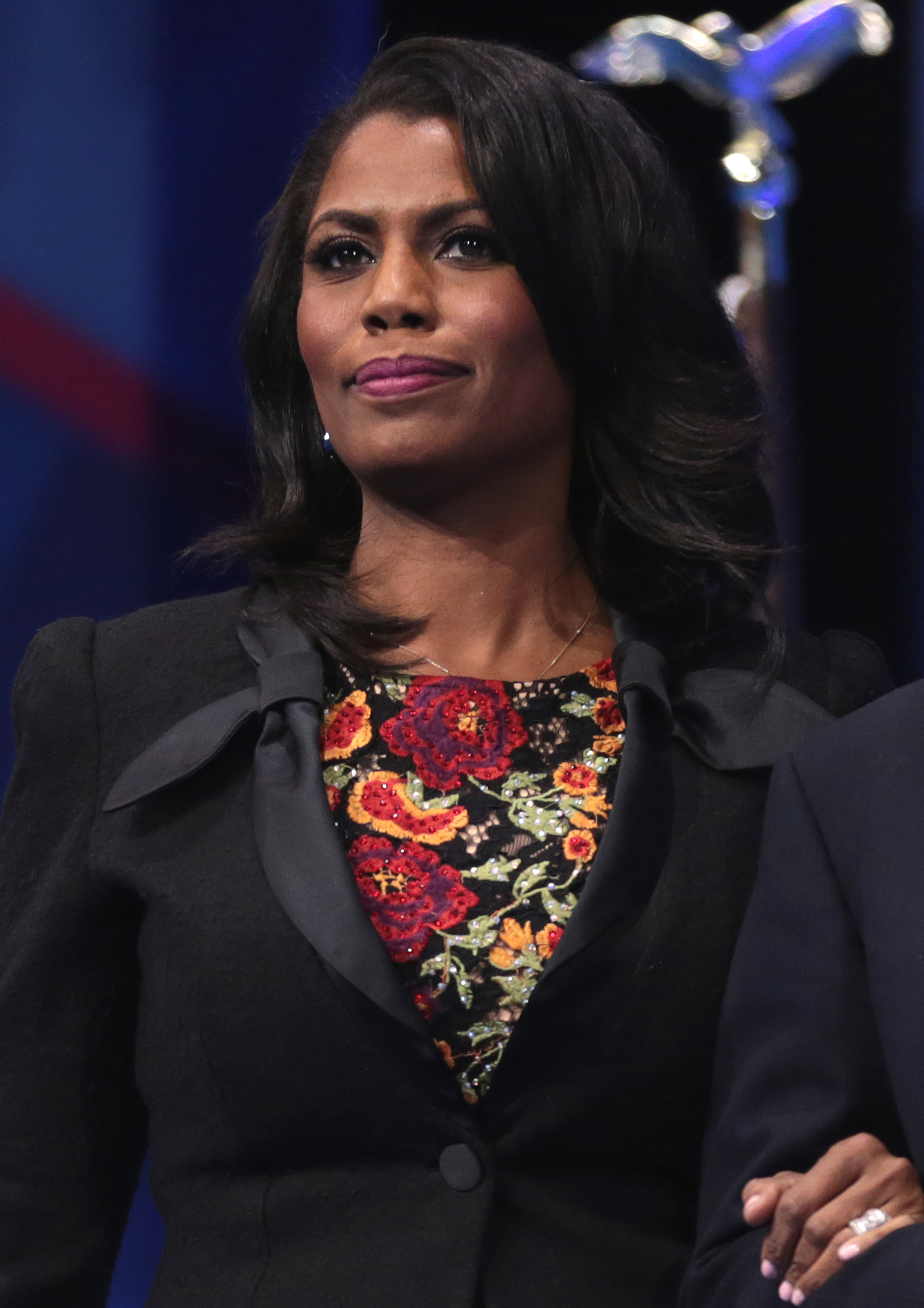
Omarosa

=== Presidents ===
- Joe Biden, 46th President of the United States (2021–2025) (under whom Harris served as vice president), 47th Vice President of the United States (2009–2017), U.S. Senator from Delaware (1973–2009), former 2024 Democratic presidential presumptive nominee
- Jimmy Carter, 39th President of the United States (1977–1981), 76th Governor of Georgia (1971–1975)
- Bill Clinton, 42nd President of the United States (1993–2001), 40th and 42nd Governor of Arkansas (1979–1981, 1983–1992), Attorney General of Arkansas (1977–1979)
- Barack Obama, 44th President of the United States (2009–2017), U.S. Senator from Illinois (2005–2008)

=== Vice presidents ===
- Dick Cheney, 46th Vice President of the United States (2001–2009), U.S. Secretary of Defense (1989–1993), House Minority Whip (1989), Chair of the House Republican Conference (1987–1989), U.S. Representative from Wyoming (1979–1989), White House Chief of Staff (1975–1977), White House Deputy Chief of Staff (1974–1975) (Republican)
- Al Gore, 45th Vice President of the United States (1993–2001), U.S. Senator from Tennessee (1985–1993), U.S. Representative from TN-06 (1983–1985), and TN-04 (1977–1983), 2000 Democratic nominee for president

=== Cabinet-level officials ===
==== Current ====
- Xavier Becerra, U.S. Secretary of Health and Human Services (2021–2025), Attorney General of California (2017–2021), U.S. Representative from CA-34 (2013–2017), CA-31 (2003–2013) and CA-30 (1993–2003)
- Pete Buttigieg, U.S. Secretary of Transportation (2021–2025), Mayor of South Bend, Indiana (2012–2020), 2020 Democratic presidential candidate
- Miguel Cardona, U.S. Secretary of Education (2021–2025), Commissioner of the Connecticut State Department of Education (2019–2021)
- Jennifer Granholm, U.S. Secretary of Energy (2021–2025), Governor of Michigan (2003–2011), Attorney General of Michigan (1999–2003)
- Isabel Guzman, Administrator of the Small Business Administration (2021–2025)
- Deb Haaland, U.S. Secretary of the Interior (2021–2025), U.S. Representative from NM-01 (2019–2021)
- Gina Raimondo, U.S. Secretary of Commerce (2021–2025), Governor of Rhode Island (2015–2021), General Treasurer of Rhode Island (2011–2015)
- Michael S. Regan, Administrator of the Environmental Protection Agency (2021–2025)
- Julie Su, acting U.S. Secretary of Labor (2023–2025), U.S. Deputy Secretary of Labor (2021–2025)
- Katherine Tai, U.S. Trade Representative (2021–2025)
- Adrianne Todman, acting U.S. Secretary of Housing and Urban Development (2024–2025), U.S. Deputy Secretary of Housing and Urban Development (2021–2025)
- Tom Vilsack, U.S. Secretary of Agriculture (2009–2017, 2021–2025), Governor of Iowa (1999–2007)

==== Former ====
- Martin Neil Baily, Chair of the Council of Economic Advisers (1999–2001)
- Rand Beers, acting U.S. Secretary of Homeland Security (2013), acting Deputy Secretary of Homeland Security (2013), Under Secretary of Homeland Security for National Protection and Programs (2009–2014), Assistant Secretary of State for International Narcotics and Law Enforcement Affairs (1998–2002)
- W. Michael Blumenthal, U.S. Secretary of the Treasury (1977–1979)
- John Brennan, Director of the CIA (2013–2017), Homeland Security Advisor (2009–2013)
- Carol Browner, Director of the White House Office of Energy and Climate Change Policy (2009–2011), Administrator of the Environmental Protection Agency (1993–2001)
- Sylvia Mathews Burwell, U.S. Secretary of Health and Human Services (2014–2017), Director of the Office of Management and Budget (2013–2014)
- Julian Castro, U.S. Secretary of Housing and Urban Development (2014–2017), Mayor of San Antonio, Texas (2009–2014), 2020 candidate for the Democratic nomination for president
- Steven Chu, U.S. Secretary of Energy (2009–2013)
- Henry Cisneros, U.S. Secretary of Housing and Urban Development (1993–1997), Mayor of San Antonio, Texas (1981–1989)
- James Clapper, Director of National Intelligence (2010–2017)
- Hillary Clinton, U.S. Secretary of State (2009–2013), U.S. Senator from New York (2001–2009), First Lady of the United States (1993–2001), 2016 Democratic nominee for president
- William Cohen, U.S. Defense Secretary (1997–2001), U.S. Senator from Maine (1979–1997) (Republican)
- William M. Daley, White House Chief of Staff (2011–2012), U.S. Secretary of Commerce (1997–2000)
- Brian Deese, Director of the National Economic Council (2021–2023), Senior Advisor to the President of the United States (2015–2017), acting Director of the Office of Management and Budget (2014), Deputy Director of the Office of Management and Budget (2013–2015)
- John M. Deutch, Director of Central Intelligence (1995–1996), U.S. Deputy Secretary of Defense (1994–1995), Under Secretary of Defense for Acquisition and Technology (1993–1994)
- Thomas E. Donilon, U.S. National Security Advisor (2010–2013), Deputy National Security Advisor (2009–2010), Assistant Secretary of State for Public Affairs (1993–1996)
- Arne Duncan, U.S. Secretary of Education (2009–2016)
- Mike Espy, U.S. Secretary of Agriculture (1993–1994), U.S. Representative from MS-02 (1987–1993)
- Jason Furman, Chair of the Council of Economic Advisers (2013–2017)
- Marcia Fudge, U.S. Secretary of Housing and Urban Development (2021–2024), U.S. Representative from OH-11 (2008–2021), Chair of the Congressional Black Caucus (2013–2015)
- Stuart M. Gerson, acting U.S. Attorney General (1993), United States Assistant Attorney General for the Civil Division (1989–1993) (Republican)
- Dan Glickman, U.S. Secretary of Agriculture (1995–2001), U.S. Representative from KS-04 (1977–1995)
- Alberto Gonzales, U.S. Attorney General (2005–2007), White House Counsel (2001–2005), Justice of the Supreme Court of Texas (1999–2001), Secretary of State of Texas (1998–1999) (Republican)
- Chuck Hagel, U.S. Defense Secretary (2013–2015), U.S. Senator from Nebraska (1997–2009) (Republican)
- Michael Hayden, Director of the Central Intelligence Agency (2006–2009), Director of the National Security Agency (1999–2005)
- Carla Anderson Hills, U.S. Trade Representative (1989–1993), U.S. Secretary of Housing and Urban Development (1975–1977) (Republican)
- Eric Holder, U.S. Attorney General (acting 2001, 2009–2015) U.S. Deputy Attorney General (1997–2001) U.S. Attorney for the District of Columbia (1993–1997), Judge of the Superior Court of the District of Columbia (1988–1993)
- Lisa P. Jackson, Administrator of the Environmental Protection Agency (2009–2013)
- Sally Jewell, U.S. Secretary of the Interior (2013–2017)
- Jeh Johnson, U.S. Secretary of Homeland Security (2013–2017)
- Peter Keisler, acting U.S. Attorney General (2007), United States Assistant Attorney General for the Civil Division (2003–2007), acting United States Associate Attorney General (2002–2003) (Republican)
- John Kerry, U.S. Secretary of State (2013–2017), U.S. Special Presidential Envoy for Climate (2021–2024), U.S. Senator from Massachusetts (1985–2013), Lieutenant Governor of Massachusetts (1983–1985), 2004 Democratic nominee for president
- Ron Kirk, U.S. Trade Representative (2009–2013)
- Ron Klain, White House Chief of Staff (2021–2023), White House Ebola Response Coordinator (2014–2015), Chief of Staff to the Vice President (2009–2011)
- Ray LaHood, U.S. Secretary of Transportation (2009–2013), U.S. Representative from IL-18 (1995–2009) (Republican)
- Anthony Lake, U.S. National Security Advisor (1993–1997)
- Gary Locke, U.S. Secretary of Commerce (2009–2011), U.S. Ambassador to China (2011–2014), Governor of Washington (1997–2005)
- James Loy, acting U.S. Secretary of Homeland Security (2005), U.S. Deputy Secretary of Homeland Security (2003–2005), Administrator of the Transportation Security Administration (2002–2003)
- Loretta Lynch, U.S. Attorney General (2015–2017), U.S. Attorney for the Eastern District of New York (1999–2001, 2010–2015)
- Demetrios Marantis, acting U.S. Trade Representative (2013)
- Gina McCarthy, Administrator of the Environmental Protection Agency (2013–2017), White House National Climate Advisor (2021–2022)
- John E. McLaughlin, acting Director of Central Intelligence (2004), Deputy Director of Central Intelligence (2000–2004)
- Janet Napolitano, U.S. Secretary of Homeland Security (2009–2013), Governor of Arizona (2003–2009), Arizona Attorney General (1999–2003), U.S. Attorney for the District of Arizona (1993–1997)
- John Negroponte, U.S. Deputy Secretary of State (2007–2009), Director of National Intelligence (2005–2007), U.S. Ambassador to Iraq (2004–2005), U.S. Ambassador to the United Nations (2001–2004), U.S. Ambassador to the Philippines (1993–1996), U.S. Ambassador to Mexico (1989–1993), Deputy National Security Advisor (1987–1989), Assistant Secretary of State for Oceans and International Environmental and Scientific Affairs (1985–1987), U.S. Ambassador to Honduras (1981–1985) (Republican)
- Peter R. Orszag, Director of the Office of Management and Budget (2009–2010)
- Leon Panetta, U.S. Defense Secretary (2011–2013), Director of the CIA (2009–2011), White House Chief of Staff (1994–1997), director of the Office of Management and Budget (1993–1994), and U.S. Representative from CA-16 (1977–1993) and CA-17 (1993)
- William J. Perry, U.S. Secretary of Defense (1994–1997), Deputy Secretary of Defense (1993–1994), Under Secretary of Defense for Research and Engineering (1977–1981)
- Mary E. Peters, U.S. Secretary of Transportation (2006–2009) (Republican)
- Penny Pritzker, U.S. Secretary of Commerce (2013–2017)
- Robert Reich, U.S. Secretary of Labor (1993–1997)
- Susan Rice, U.S. Domestic Policy Council director (2021–2023), U.S. National Security Advisor (2013–2017), U.S. Ambassador to the United Nations (2009–2013)
- Robert Rubin, U.S. Secretary of the Treasury (1995–1999)
- Miriam Sapiro, acting U.S. Trade Representative (2013), Deputy Trade Representative (2009–2014)
- Kathleen Sebelius, U.S. Secretary of Health and Human Services (2009–2014), Governor of Kansas (2003–2009)
- Donna Shalala, U.S. Secretary of Health and Human Services (1993–2001), U.S. Representative from FL-27 (2019–2021)
- Joseph Stiglitz, Chair of the Council of Economic Advisers (1995–1997)
- Lawrence Summers, U.S. Secretary of the Treasury (1999–2001), Director of the National Economic Council (2009–2011)
- William Howard Taft IV, acting U.S. Secretary of Defense (1989), Legal Adviser of the Department of State (2001–2005), U.S. Ambassador to NATO (1989–1992), U.S. Deputy Secretary of Defense (1984–1989) and great-grandson of President William Howard Taft (Republican)
- Laura Tyson, Chair of the Council of Economic Advisers (1993–1995), Director of the National Economic Council (1995–1996)
- Ann Veneman, U.S. Secretary of Agriculture (2001–2005) (Republican)
- Marty Walsh, U.S. Secretary of Labor (2021–2023), Mayor of Boston (2014–2021)
- Jack Watson, White House Chief of Staff (1980–1981), White House Cabinet Secretary (1970–1980)
- William H. Webster, chair of the Homeland Security Advisory Council (2005–2020), Director of Central Intelligence (1987–1991), Director of the Federal Bureau of Investigation (1978–1987) (Republican)
- Christine Todd Whitman, Administrator of the Environmental Protection Agency (2001–2003), Governor of New Jersey (1994–2001) (Forward) (Note: Served office as a Republican.)
- Neal S. Wolin, acting U.S. Secretary of the Treasury (2013), U.S. Deputy Secretary of the Treasury (2009–2013)
- Sally Yates, acting U.S. Attorney General (2017), Deputy U.S. Attorney General (2015–2017), U.S. Attorney for the Northern District of Georgia (2010–2015)
- Robert Zoellick, U.S. Trade Representative (2001–2005), United States Deputy Secretary of State (2005–2006), White House Deputy Chief of Staff (1992–1993) (Republican)

=== White House staff ===
==== Current ====
- Philip H. Gordon, National Security Advisor to the Vice President (2022–2025)
- Tom Perez, Senior Advisor to the President for Intergovernmental Affairs (2023–2025), Director of the Office of Intergovernmental Affairs (2023–2025), Chair of the Democratic National Committee (2017–2021), U.S. Secretary of Labor (2013–2017), U.S. Assistant Attorney General for the Civil Rights Division (2009–2013)
- Cameron Webb, White House Senior Policy Advisor for COVID-19 Equity (2021–2025)
- Erin Wilson, Deputy Chief of Staff to the Vice President (2022–2025)

==== Former ====
- Nasrina Bargzie, deputy counsel to the vice president of the United States (2022–2024)
- Andrea Barthwell, deputy director for Demand Reduction at the Office of National Drug Control Policy (2001–2004) (Republican)
- Robert Bauer, White House Counsel (2010–2011)
- Sidney Blumenthal, Senior Advisor to the President of the United States (1997–2001)
- Keisha Lance Bottoms, Senior Advisor to the President (2022–2023), Mayor of Atlanta (2018–2022), Member of the Atlanta City Council (2010–2018)
- Phillip D. Brady, White House Staff Secretary (1991–1993), White House Cabinet Secretary (1989) (Republican)
- Jake Braun, White House Liaison to the U.S. Department of Homeland Security (2009–2011)
- James W. Cicconi, White House Staff Secretary (1989–1990) (Republican)
- Ty Cobb, White House Special Counsel (2017–2018), Assistant U.S. Attorney for the District of Maryland in (1981–1986) (Republican)
- Jen O'Malley Dillon, White House Deputy Chief of Staff (2021–2024) (Harris's Campaign Chairwoman)
- Joshua DuBois, Director of the White House Office of Faith-Based and Neighborhood Partnerships (2009–2013)
- Anita Dunn, Senior Advisor to the President (2022–2024)
- Richard A. Falkenrath, Deputy Assistant to the President and Deputy Homeland Security Advisor (2003–2004) (Republican)
- Rufus Gifford, U.S. Chief of Protocol (2022–2023), U.S. Ambassador to Denmark (2013–2017) (Harris's Campaign Finance Chair)
- Juleanna Glover, Press Secretary to the Vice President (2001–2002)
- Alyssa Farah Griffin, White House Director of Strategic Communications (2020), Press Secretary of the U.S. Department of Defense (2019–2020), Press Secretary to the Vice President (2017–2019) and co-host of The View (Republican) (previously endorsed Nikki Haley)
- Stephanie Grisham, White House Press Secretary (2019–2020), White House Communications Director (2019–2020), Press Secretary for the First Lady (2017–2019, 2020–2021), Chief of Staff to the First Lady (2020–2021) (Republican)
- Josh Hsu, Counsel to the Vice President (2021–2023)
- Sarah Hurwitz, head speechwriter for First Lady Michelle Obama (2010–2017)
- Cassidy Hutchinson, executive assistant to the White House Chief of Staff (2020–2021) (Republican)
- Ashish Jha, White House COVID-19 Response Coordinator (2022–2023), Dean of Brown University School of Public Health (2020–present)
- Broderick D. Johnson, White House Cabinet Secretary (2014–2017)
- Megan K. Jones, Assistant to the President and Director of Public Engagement and Intergovernmental Affairs for the Office of the Vice President (2022–2023)
- Bill Kristol, Chief of Staff to the Vice President (1989–1993) (Republican until 2020)
- Mitch Landrieu, Senior Advisor to the President for Infrastructure Implementation Coordination (2021–2024), White House Coordinator for the Infrastructure Investment and Jobs Act (2021–2024), Mayor of New Orleans (2010–2018), Lieutenant Governor of Louisiana (2004–2010) (Harris's Campaign Co-Chair)
- Ann Lewis, Counselor to the President (1999–2001), White House Communications Director (1997–1999)
- Sarah Matthews, Deputy White House Press Secretary (2020–2021) (Republican) (previously endorsed Nikki Haley)
- Nancy McEldowney, National Security Advisor to the Vice President (2021–2022), Director of the Foreign Service Institute (2013–2017), U.S. Ambassador to Bulgaria (2008–2009)
- Jim Messina, White House Deputy Chief of Staff for Operations (2009–2011)
- Omarosa, Communications Director of the Office of Public Liaison (2017–2018), reality TV star (Independent)
- Sheila Nix, Chief of Staff to the Secretary of Education (2021–2023), Chief of Staff to the Second Lady (2013–2017) (Harris's Campaign Chief of Staff)
- Jennifer Palmieri, White House Communications Director (2013–2015)
- Daniel Pfeiffer, Senior Advisor to the President of the United States (2013–2015), White House Communications Director (2009–2013)
- David Plouffe, Senior Advisor to the President (2011–2013)
- Jen Psaki, White House Press Secretary (2021–2022), White House Communications Director (2015–2017), Spokesperson for the U.S. State Department (2013–2015), Deputy White House Communications Director (2009–2011), White House Deputy Press Secretary (2009)
- Mike Pyle, U.S. Deputy National Security Advisor for International Economics (2022–2024)
- Dana Remus, White House Counsel (2021–2022)
- Cedric Richmond, DNC Senior Advisor (2022–present), Senior Advisor to the President (2021–2022), U.S. Representative from LA-02 (2011–2021) (Harris's Campaign Co-chair)
- Julie Chávez Rodriguez, Senior Advisor to the President (2022–2023) (Harris's Campaign Manager)
- Dan K. Rosenthal, Assistant to the President and director of Advance (1997–2000), special assistant to the president and deputy director of Advance (1995–1997)
- Anthony Scaramucci, White House Communications Director (2017) (Republican)
- Jeff Shesol, Presidential Speechwriter (1998–2001)
- Stephen Slick, special assistant to the president (2005–2009)
- Pete Souza, Chief Official White House Photographer (1983–1989, 2009–2017)
- Gene Sperling, Senior Advisor to the President for the American Rescue Plan (2021–2024), director of the National Economic Council (2011–2014, 1996–2001)
- Olivia Troye, Homeland Security and Counterterrorism advisor to Vice President Mike Pence (Republican)
- Kemba Walden, U.S. National Cyber Director (2023)
- Nicolle Wallace, White House Communications Director (2005–2006) (Republican)
- Edward L. Widmer, special assistant to the president (1997–2001)

=== U.S. ambassadors ===
==== Current ====
- Joe Kennedy III, United States Special Envoy for Northern Ireland (2022–2025), U.S. Representative from MA-04 (2013–2021)
- Victoria Reggie Kennedy, U.S. Ambassador to Austria (2022–2025)

==== Former ====
- Gina Abercrombie-Winstanley, U.S. Ambassador to Malta (2012–2016)
- Yohannes Abraham, U.S. Ambassador to ASEAN (2022–2024)
- Charles C. Adams Jr., U.S. Ambassador to Finland (2015–2017)
- Brooke D. Anderson, Alternate Representative of the United States of America for Special Political Affairs in the United Nations (2010–2011)
- Alexander Arvizu, U.S. Ambassador to Albania (2010–2015)
- Mark L. Asquino, U.S. Ambassador to Equatorial Guinea (2012–2015)
- Nicole Avant, U.S. Ambassador to the Bahamas (2009–2011)
- Harriet C. Babbitt, U.S. Ambassador to the OAS (1993–1997), First Lady of Arizona (1978–1987)
- Dan Baer, U.S. Ambassador to the OSCE (2013–2017)
- R. Stephen Beecroft, U.S. Ambassador to Egypt (2015–2017), U.S. Ambassador to Iraq (2012–2014), U.S. Ambassador to Jordan (2008–2011)
- John Beyrle, U.S. Ambassador to Russia (2008–2012), U.S. Ambassador to Bulgaria (2005–2008)
- James D. Bindenagel, Special Envoy for Holocaust Issues (1999–2002)
- Jack R. Binns, U.S. Ambassador to Honduras (1980–1981)
- Robert D. Blackwill, U.S. Ambassador to India (2001–2003) (Republican)
- James J. Blanchard, U.S. Ambassador to Canada (1993–1996), Governor of Michigan (1983–1991), and U.S. Representative from MI-08 (1975–1983)
- John W. Blaney, U.S. Ambassador to Liberia (2002–2005)
- Jeff Bleich, U.S. Ambassador to Australia (2009–2013)
- Barbara Bodine, U.S. Ambassador to Yemen (1997–2001)
- Amy L. Bondurant, U.S. Ambassador to the OECD (1997–2001)
- Aurelia E. Brazeal, U.S. Ambassador to Ethiopia (2002–2005), U.S. Ambassador to Kenya (1993–1996), U.S. Ambassador to Micronesia (1990–1993)
- Wally Brewster, U.S. Ambassador to the Dominican Republic (2013–2017)
- Kenneth C. Brill, U.S. Ambassador to the United Nations International Organizations in Vienna (2001–2004), U.S. Ambassador to Cyprus (1996–1999), Executive Secretary of the United States Department of State (1994–1996)
- Tim Broas, U.S. Ambassador to the Netherlands (2014–2016)
- George Charles Bruno, U.S. Ambassador to Belize (1994–1997)
- James R. Bullington, U.S. Ambassador to Burundi (1983–1986)
- Richard R. Burt, U.S. Ambassador to West Germany (1985–1989), Assistant Secretary of State for European and Eurasian Affairs (1983–1985) (Republican)
- Phillip Carter, U.S. Ambassador to Ivory Coast (2010–2013), U.S. Ambassador to Guinea (2007–2008)
- Judith Beth Cefkin, U.S. Ambassador to Fiji, Kiribati, Nauru, Tonga, and Tuvalu (2015–2018)
- Philip T. Chicola, U.S. Ambassador to Brazil (charge d'affaires) (2005–2006)
- Jack Chow, special representative of the U.S. Secretary of State on Global HIV/AIDS (2001–2003)
- Tom Cooney, U.S. Ambassador to Argentina (charge d'affaires) (2017–2018)
- James Costos, U.S. Ambassador to Spain (2013–2017), U.S. Ambassador to Andorra (2014–2017)
- Cindy Courville, U.S. Ambassador to the African Union (2006–2008)
- Carolyn Curiel, U.S. Ambassador to Belize (1998–2001)
- Ivo H. Daalder, U.S. Ambassador to NATO (2009–2013)
- Glyn T. Davies, U.S. Ambassador to Thailand (2015–2018), U.S. Special Representative for North Korea Policy (2011–2014), U.S. Ambassador to the UN International Organizations in Vienna (2009–2011)
- Jeffrey DeLaurentis, U.S. Ambassador to the United Nations for Special Political Affairs (2011–2014, acting 2021–2023)
- Greg Delawie, U.S. Ambassador to Kosovo (2015–2018)
- Christopher Dell, U.S. Ambassador to Kosovo (2009–2012), U.S. Ambassador to Zimbabwe (2004–2007), U.S. Ambassador to Angola (2001–2004)
- Miguel H. Díaz, U.S. Ambassador to the Holy See (2009–2012)
- Kathleen A. Doherty, U.S. Ambassador to Cyprus (2015–2019)
- Joe Donnelly, U.S. Ambassador to the Holy See (2022–2024), U.S. Senator from Indiana (2013–2019), and U.S. Representative from IN-02 (2007–2013)
- William Eacho, U.S. Ambassador to Slovenia (1998–2001)
- Norm Eisen, U.S. Ambassador to the Czech Republic (2011–2014)
- Nancy Halliday Ely-Raphel, U.S. Ambassador to Austria (2009–2013)
- John B. Emerson, U.S. Ambassador to Germany (2013–2017)
- Gregory W. Engle, U.S. Ambassador to Togo (2003–2005)
- John L. Estrada, U.S. Ambassador to Trinidad and Tobago (2016–2017), Sergeant Major of the Marine Corps (2003–2007)
- John D. Feeley, U.S. Ambassador to Panama (2015–2018)
- Gerald M. Feierstein, U.S. Ambassador to Yemen (2010–2013)
- Laurie S. Fulton, U.S. Ambassador to Denmark (2009–2013)
- Julie Furuta-Toy, U.S. Ambassador to Equatorial Guinea (2016–2019)
- Edward M. Gabriel, U.S. Ambassador to Morocco (1997–2001)
- Peter Galbraith, Vermont State Senator from Windham district (2011–2015), U.S. Ambassador to Croatia (1993–1998)
- Mark Gilbert, U.S. Ambassador to New Zealand (2015–2017), U.S. Ambassador to Samoa (2015–2017)
- Robert S. Gilchrist, U.S. Ambassador to Lithuania (2020–2023)
- Jon D. Glassman, U.S. Ambassador to Paraguay (1991–1994)
- Anthony F. Godfrey, U.S. Ambassador to Serbia (2019–2022)
- Gary A. Grappo, U.S. Ambassador to Oman (2006–2009)
- Gordon Gray III, U.S. Ambassador to Tunisia (2009–2012)
- Michael E. Guest, U.S. Ambassador to Romania (2001–2004) (Republican)
- Howard Gutman, U.S. Ambassador to Belgium (2009–2013)
- Richard N. Haass, U.S. Special Envoy for Northern Ireland (2001–2003)
- Anne Hall, U.S. Ambassador to Lithuania (2016–2019)
- S. Fitzgerald Haney, U.S. Ambassador to Costa Rica (2015–2017)
- Anthony Stephen Harrington, U.S. Ambassador to Brazil (2000–2001), Chair of the PIAB (1994–2000)
- Fay Hartog-Levin, U.S. Ambassador to the Netherlands (2009–2011)
- Douglas A. Hartwick, U.S. Ambassador to Laos (2001–2004)
- Samuel D. Heins, U.S. Ambassador to Norway (2016–2017)
- Bruce Heyman, U.S. Ambassador to Canada (2014–2017)
- Doug Hickey, U.S. Ambassador to Finland (2022–2024)
- Richard E. Hoagland, U.S. Ambassador to Kazakhstan (2008–2011), U.S. Ambassador to Tajikistan (2003–2006)
- J. Anthony Holmes, U.S. Ambassador to Burkina Faso (2002–2005)
- Michael S. Hoza, U.S. Ambassador to Cameroon (2014–2017)
- Vicki J. Huddleston, U.S. Ambassador to Mali (2002–2005), U.S. Ambassador to Madagascar (1995–1997)
- Marie T. Huhtala, U.S. Ambassador to Malaysia (2001–2004)
- Robert P. Jackson, U.S. Ambassador to Ghana (2015–2018), U.S. Ambassador to Cameroon (2010–2013)
- Susan S. Jacobs, Special Advisor for Children's Issues (2011–2017), U.S. Ambassador to the Solomon Islands, Vanuatu and Papua New Guinea (2000–2003)
- David C. Jacobson, U.S. Ambassador to Canada (2009–2013)
- Roberta S. Jacobson, U.S. Ambassador to Mexico (2016–2018), Assistant Secretary of State for Western Hemisphere Affairs (2011–2016)
- Deborah K. Jones, U.S. Ambassador to Libya (2013–2015), U.S. Ambassador to Kuwait (2008–2011)
- Richard Kauzlarich, U.S. Ambassador to Bosnia and Herzegovina (1997–1999), U.S. Ambassador to Azerbaijan (1994–1997)
- Laura E. Kennedy, U.S. Permanent Representative to the Conference on Disarmament (2010–2013), U.S. Ambassador to Turkmenistan (2001–2003)
- Michael David Kirby, U.S. Ambassador to Serbia (2012–2016), U.S. Ambassador to Moldova (2006–2008)
- Philip S. Kosnett, U.S. Ambassador to Kosovo (2018–2021)
- Daniel C. Kurtzer, U.S. Ambassador to Israel (2001–2005), U.S. Ambassador to Egypt (1997–2001)
- David Floyd Lambertson, U.S. Ambassador to Thailand (1991–1995)
- Frank Lavin, U.S. Ambassador to Singapore (2001–2005) (Republican)
- Michael C. Lemmon, U.S. Ambassador to Armenia (1998–2001)
- Dawn M. Liberi, U.S. Ambassador to Burundi (2012–2016)
- Robert Geers Loftis, U.S. Ambassador to Lesotho (2001–2004)
- Carmen Lomellin, U.S. Ambassador to the OAS (2009–2016)
- Lewis Lukens, U.S. Ambassador to Senegal and Guinea-Bissau (2011–2014)
- Deborah R. Malac, U.S. Ambassador to Uganda (2016–2020), U.S. Ambassador to Liberia (2012–2015)
- Eileen A. Malloy, U.S. Ambassador to Kyrgyzstan (1994–1997)
- Robert A. Mandell, U.S. Ambassador to Luxembourg (2011–2015)
- R. Niels Marquardt, U.S. Ambassador to Madagascar (2007–2010), U.S. Ambassador to Cameroon (2004–2007), U.S. Ambassador to Equatorial Guinea (2004–2006)
- Marshall Fletcher McCallie, U.S. Ambassador to Namibia (1993–1996)
- Michael McFaul, U.S. Ambassador to Russia (2012–2014)
- Michael McKinley, U.S. Ambassador to Brazil (2017–2018), U.S. Ambassador to Afghanistan (2015–2016), U.S. Ambassador to Colombia (2010–2013), U.S. Ambassador to Peru (2007–2010)
- Elizabeth Davenport McKune, U.S. Ambassador to Qatar (1998–2001)
- James D. Melville Jr., U.S. Ambassador to Estonia (2015–2018)
- Richard Miles, U.S. Ambassador to Georgia (2002–2005), U.S. Ambassador to Bulgaria (1999–2002), U.S. Ambassador to Azerbaijan (1992–1993)
- Thomas J. Miller, U.S. Ambassador to Greece (2001–2004), U.S. Ambassador to Bosnia and Herzegovina (1999–2001)
- Derek J. Mitchell, U.S. Ambassador to Myanmar (2012–2016)
- Richard Morningstar, U.S. Ambassador to Azerbaijan (2012–2014), U.S. Special Envoy for Eurasian Energy (2009–2012), U.S. Ambassador to the European Union (1999–2001)
- Allan Mustard, U.S. Ambassador to Turkmenistan (2015–2019)
- Marianne M. Myles, U.S. Ambassador to Cape Verde (2008–2011)
- David D. Nelson, U.S. Ambassador to Uruguay (2009–2011)
- Wanda Nesbitt, U.S. Ambassador to Namibia (2010–2013), U.S. Ambassador to Ivory Coast (2007–2010), U.S. Ambassador to Madagascar (2002–2004)
- Crystal Nix-Hines, U.S. Ambassador to UNESCO (2014–2017)
- Walter E. North, U.S. Ambassador to the Solomon Islands, Vanuatu and Papua New Guinea (2012–2016)
- Ted Osius, U.S. Ambassador to Vietnam (2014–2017)
- Joseph R. Paolino Jr., U.S. Ambassador to Malta (1994–1996)
- Mark A. Pekala, U.S. Ambassador to Latvia (2012–2015)
- June Carter Perry, U.S. Ambassador to Sierra Leone (2007–2009), U.S. Ambassador to Lesotho (2004–2007)
- Mary Ann Peters, U.S. Ambassador to Bangladesh (2000–2003)
- Charisse Phillips, U.S. Ambassador to Bolivia (charge d'affaires) (2020–2022)
- Steven Pifer, U.S. Ambassador to Ukraine (1998–2000)
- Nancy Jo Powell, U.S. Ambassador to India (2012–2014), U.S. Ambassador to Nepal (2007–2010), U.S. Ambassador to Pakistan (2002–2004), U.S. Ambassador to Ghana (2001–2002), U.S. Ambassador to Uganda (1997–1999)
- Charles A. Ray, U.S. Ambassador to Zimbabwe (2009–2012), U.S. Ambassador to Cambodia (2003–2005)
- Thomas Bolling Robertson, U.S. Ambassador to Slovenia (2004–2007)
- Leslie V. Rowe, U.S. Ambassador to Mozambique (2010–2012), U.S. Ambassador to Papua New Guinea, the Solomon Islands, and Vanuatu (2006–2009)
- Eric S. Rubin, U.S. Ambassador to Bulgaria (2016–2019)
- David Saperstein, U.S. Ambassador-at-Large for International Religious Freedom (2015–2017)
- Andrew H. Schapiro, U.S. Ambassador to the Czech Republic (2014–2017)
- Gregory Schulte, U.S. Ambassador to the International Atomic Energy Agency (2005–2009)
- Kyle Randolph Scott, U.S. Ambassador to Serbia (2016–2019)
- Stephen Seche, U.S. Ambassador to Yemen (2007–2010)
- Theodore Sedgwick, U.S. Ambassador to Slovakia (2010–2015)
- Derek Shearer, U.S. Ambassador to Finland (1994–1997)
- Dana Shell Smith, U.S. Ambassador to Qatar (2014–2017)
- Robert A. Sherman, U.S. Ambassador to Portugal (2014–2017)
- David H. Shinn, U.S. Ambassador to Burkina Faso (1987–1990), U.S. Ambassador to Ethiopia (1996–1999)
- Emil Skodon, U.S. Ambassador to Brunei (2005–2008)
- Nancy Soderberg, Alternate Representative of the United States of America for Special Political Affairs in the United Nations (1998–2001)
- Alan Solomont, U.S. Ambassador to Spain and Andorra (2010–2013)
- Mark C. Storella, U.S. Ambassador to Zambia (2010–2013)
- Joseph G. Sullivan, U.S. Ambassador to Zimbabwe (2001–2004), U.S. Ambassador to Angola (1998–2001)
- Harry K. Thomas Jr., U.S. Ambassador to Zimbabwe (2016–2018), U.S. Ambassador to the Philippines (2010–2013), Director General of the Foreign Service (2007–2009), Executive Secretary of the United States Department of State (2005–2007), U.S. Ambassador to Bangladesh (2003–2007)
- Robert H. Tuttle, U.S. Ambassador to the United Kingdom (2005–2009) (Republican)
- Shari Villarosa, U.S. Ambassador to the Seychelles and U.S. Ambassador to Mauritius (2012–2017)
- Jenonne R. Walker, U.S. Ambassador to the Czech Republic (1995–1998)
- Marc M. Wall, U.S. Ambassador to Chad (2004–2007)
- James Donald Walsh, U.S. Ambassador to Argentina (2000–2003)
- Earl Anthony Wayne, U.S. Ambassador to Mexico (2011–2015), U.S. Ambassador to Argentina (2007–2009), Assistant Secretary of State for Economic and Business Affairs (2000–2006)
- Alexa L. Wesner, U.S. Ambassador to Austria (2013–2017)
- Kevin Whitaker, U.S. Ambassador to Colombia (2014–2019)
- Barry B. White, U.S. Ambassador to Norway (2009–2013)
- Bisa Williams, U.S. Ambassador to Niger (2010–2013)
- Duane Woerth, U.S. Permanent Representative to the ICAO (2010–2013)
- Kenneth Spencer Yalowitz, U.S. Ambassador to Georgia (1994–1997), U.S. Ambassador to Belarus (1998–2001)
- John Melvin Yates, U.S. Ambassador to Cameroon and Equatorial Guinea (1999–2001), U.S. Ambassador to Benin (1995–1998), U.S. Ambassador to Niger (1983–1986)
- Marie Yovanovitch, U.S. Ambassador to Ukraine (2016–2019), U.S. Ambassador to Armenia (2008–2011), U.S. Ambassador to Kyrgyzstan (2005–2008)

=== U.S. attorneys ===
==== Former ====
- Preet Bharara, Southern District of New York (2009–2017)
- Greg Brower, District of Nevada (2008–2009) (Republican)
- Nick Brown, Western District of Washington (2021–2023), 2024 Democratic nominee for Attorney General of Washington
- Tristram J. Coffin, District of Vermont (2009–2015)
- Vince Cohen Jr., District of Columbia (acting; 2015)
- Michael W. Cotter, District of Montana (2009–2017)
- Deirdre M. Daly, District of Connecticut (2013–2017)
- Gregory K. Davis, Southern District of Mississippi (2012–2017)
- Jenny Durkan, Western District of Washington (2009–2014), mayor of Seattle, Washington (2017–2021)
- Conner Eldridge, Western District of Arkansas (2010–2015)
- Zachary T. Fardon, Northern District of Illinois (2013–2017)
- Paul J. Fishman, District of New Jersey (2009–2017)
- Barry Grissom, District of Kansas (2010–2016)
- Melinda Haag, Northern District of California (2010–2016)
- Timothy J. Heaphy, Western District of Virginia (2009–2015)
- Dwight C. Holton, District of Oregon (2010–2011)
- Brendan V. Johnson, District of South Dakota (2009–2015)
- William C. Killian, Eastern District of Tennessee (2010–2015)
- Nicholas A. Klinefeldt, Southern District of Iowa (2009–2015)
- Jim Lewis, Central District of Illinois (2010–2016)
- Karen Loeffler, District of Alaska (2009–2017)
- Kenneth Magidson, Southern District of Texas (2011–2017)
- John McKay, Western District of Washington (2001–2007) (Republican)
- Patrick Miles Jr., Western District of Michigan (2012–2017)
- Eric Miller, District of Vermont (2015–2017)
- Florence T. Nakakuni, District of Hawaii (2009–2017)
- Bill Nettles, District of South Carolina (2010–2016)
- Charles Oberly, District of Delaware (2011–2017)
- Wendy Olson, District of Idaho (2010–2017)
- Channing D. Phillips, District of Columbia (acting; 2009–2010, 2015–2017, 2021)
- Tim Purdon, District of North Dakota (2010–2015)
- Betty Hansen Richardson, District of Idaho (1993–2001)
- Ronald Sharpe, District of the Virgin Islands (2009–2017)
- Kevin W. Techau, Northern District of Iowa (2014–2017)
- Anne Tompkins, Western District of North Carolina (2010–2015)
- Joyce Vance, Northern District of Alabama (2009–2017)
- John W. Vaudreuil, Western District of Wisconsin (2010–2017)
- Benjamin Wagner, Eastern District of California (2009–2016)
- Thomas Walker, Eastern District of North Carolina (2011–2016)
- John F. Walsh, District of Colorado (2010–2016)

=== Other administrative officials ===
==== Current ====
- Chidi Blyden, Deputy CEO of the Millennium Challenge Corporation (2023–2025), Deputy Assistant Secretary of Defense for African Affairs (2021–2023)
- Carol Moseley Braun, Chair of the United States African Development Foundation (2024–present), U.S. Ambassador to New Zealand and Samoa (1999–2001), U.S. Senator from Illinois (1993–1999)
- Nani A. Coloretti, deputy director of the Office of Management and Budget (2022–2025), Deputy Secretary of Housing and Urban Development (2014–2017), Assistant Secretary of the Treasury for Management (2012–2014)
- David W. Crane, Under Secretary of Energy for Infrastructure (2023–2025)
- Charles Djou, Secretary of the American Battle Monuments Commission (2022–2025), U.S. Representative from HI-1 (2010–2011) (Independent; Republican until 2018)
- Stuart E. Eizenstat, Special Advisor for Holocaust Issues (2013–present), Deputy Secretary of the Treasury (1999–2001), Under Secretary of State for Economic, Business, and Agricultural Affairs (1997–1999), Under Secretary of Commerce for International Trade (1996–1997), U.S. Ambassador to the European Union (1993–1996), White House Domestic Affairs Advisor (1977–1981)
- Glen S. Fukushima, vice chairman of the Securities Investor Protection Corporation (2022–present)
- Jamie Gorelick, Chair of the Homeland Security Advisory Council (2022–2025), U.S. Deputy Attorney General (1994–1997), General Counsel of the Department of Defense (1993–1994)
- L. Felice Gorordo, United States Alternate Executive Director of the International Bank for Reconstruction and Development (2023–2025)

==== Former ====
- Kenneth Adelman, director of the Arms Control and Disarmament Agency (1983–1987), deputy U.S. ambassador to the United Nations (1981–1983) (Republican)
- Sonia Aggarwal, Special Assistant to the President for Climate Policy, Innovation, and Deployment (2022–2023)
- Parney Albright, Assistant Secretary of Homeland Security (2003–2005)
- Elizabeth M. Allen, Under Secretary of State for Public Diplomacy and Public Affairs (2023–2024), Assistant Secretary of State for Global Public Affairs (2021–2022)
- Roger Altman, U.S. Deputy Secretary of the Treasury (1993–1994)
- Donald Arthur, Surgeon General of the United States Navy (2004–2007)
- Caroline Atkinson, Deputy National Security Advisor for International Economic Affairs (2011–2015)
- Donald B. Ayer, U.S. Deputy Attorney General (1989–1990), U.S. Attorney for the Eastern District of California (1981–1986) (Independent)
- Shalanda Baker, director of the Department of Energy Office of Economic Impact and Diversity (2022–2024)
- Erica Barks-Ruggles, Assistant Secretary of State for International Organization Affairs (2021), U.S. Ambassador to Rwanda (2015–2018)
- Andrea Barthwell, deputy director for Demand Reduction at the Office of National Drug Control Policy (2002–2004) (Republican)
- Rick Barton, Assistant Secretary of State for Conflict and Stabilization Operations (2012–2014)
- Jeremy Bash, chief of staff at the Central Intelligence Agency (2009–2011) and the Department of Defense (2011–2013), and present member of the Afghanistan War Commission
- Tommy Beaudreau, U.S. Deputy Secretary of the Interior (2021–2023), Director of the Bureau of Ocean Energy Management (2010–2014)
- John B. Bellinger III, Legal Adviser of the Department of State (2005–2009) (Republican)
- Virginia L. Bennett, acting Assistant Secretary of State for Democracy, Human Rights, and Labor (2017)
- Kenneth Bernard, Special Assistant to the President and Senior Director for Biodefense on the Homeland Security Council (2002–2005)
- Charles A. Blanchard, General Counsel of the Department of the Air Force (2009–2013), General Counsel of the Army (1999–2001)
- Ronald R. Blanck, Surgeon General of the United States Army (1996–2000)
- Alan Blinder, Vice Chair of the Federal Reserve (1994–1996)
- Charles Bolden, former astronaut and Administrator of NASA (2009–2017)
- Michele Thoren Bond, Assistant Secretary of State for Consular Affairs (2014–2017), U.S. Ambassador to Lesotho (2010–2012)
- Richard A. Boucher, Assistant Secretary of State for South and Central Asian Affairs (2006–2009), Assistant Secretary of State for Public Affairs (2001–2005), Spokesperson for the United States Department of State (1992–1993, 2001–2005)
- Thomas G. Bowman, U.S. Deputy Secretary of Veterans Affairs (2017–2018) (Republican)
- Spencer Boyer, Deputy Assistant Secretary of Defense for Europe and NATO (2021–2023), Deputy Assistant Secretary of State for European and Eurasian Affairs (2009–2011)
- Lanny A. Breuer, U.S. Assistant Attorney General for the Criminal Division (2009–2013)
- Louis Caldera, U.S. Secretary of the Army (1998–2001), member of the California State Assembly from the 46th district (1992–1997)
- Leslie R. Caldwell, U.S. Assistant Attorney General for the Criminal Division (2014–2017)
- Lily Greenberg Call, Special Assistant to the Chief of Staff for the Department of the Interior (2023–2024)
- Elizabeth Cameron, Senior Director for Global Health Security and Biodefense on the National Security Council (2016–2017, 2021–2022)
- Robert Cardillo, Director of the National Geospatial-Intelligence Agency (2014–2019)
- Ann E. Carlson, acting administrator the National Highway Traffic Safety Administration (2022–2023)
- Richard Carmona U.S. Surgeon General (2002–2006)
- Patrick G. Carrick, Director of HSARPA (2015–2017)
- Phil Carter, Deputy Assistant Secretary of Defense for Detainee Policy (2009)
- Peter W. Chiarelli, Vice Chief of Staff of the United States Army (2008–2012)
- Richard A. Clarke, Assistant Secretary of State for Political-Military Affairs (1989–1992)
- Kimberly Clausing, deputy assistant secretary for tax analysis at the U.S. Department of the Treasury (2021–2022)
- Allison Clements, member of the Federal Energy Regulatory Commission (2020–2024)
- Steven Cliff, administrator of the National Highway Traffic Safety Administration (2022)
- Eliot A. Cohen, Counselor of the U.S. Department of State (2007–2009) (Republican)
- Frances Colón, Deputy Science and Technology Adviser to the Secretary of State (2008–2017) and member of the President's Council of Advisors on Science and Technology (2021–present)
- James Comey, Director of the FBI (2013–2017), U.S. Deputy Attorney General (2003–2005), U.S. Attorney for the Southern District of New York (2002–2003) (Independent)
- Erin C. Conaton, Under Secretary of Defense for Personnel and Readiness (2012), Under Secretary of the Air Force (2010–2012)
- LaVerne H. Council, Assistant Secretary for Information and Technology and Chief Information Officer for the Office of Information and Technology for the U.S. Department of Veterans Affairs (2015–2017)
- Thomas M. Countryman, acting Under Secretary of State for International Security Affairs (2016–2017), Assistant Secretary of State for International Security and Nonproliferation (2011–2017)
- Chester Crocker, Assistant Secretary of State for African Affairs (1981–1989) (Republican)
- Patrick M. Cronin, assistant administrator for policy and program coordination at USAID (2001–2003)
- John Howard Dalton, U.S. Secretary of the Navy (1993–1998)
- Richard Danzig, U.S. Secretary of the Navy (1998–2001), U.S. Under Secretary of the Navy (1993–1997)
- Janine A. Davidson, U.S. Under Secretary of the Navy (2016–2017)
- Ruth A. Davis, Director General of the Foreign Service (2001–2003), U.S. Ambassador to Benin (1992–1995)
- Mary DeRosa, Deputy Counsel to the President for National Security Affairs and Legal Adviser to the U.S. National Security Council (2009–2011)
- Brian Detter, Deputy Assistant Secretary of the Navy (Expeditionary Programs and Logistics Management) (2009–2012)
- Michael Donley, U.S. Secretary of the Air Force (2008–2013) (Republican)
- Rush Doshi, Deputy Senior Director for China and Taiwan at the U.S. National Security Council (2023–2024)
- John W. Douglass, Assistant Secretary of the Navy (Research, Development and Acquisition) (1995–1998)
- Raymond F. DuBois, acting Under Secretary of the Army (2005–2006)
- William A. Eaton, U.S. Ambassador to Panama (2005–2008), Assistant Secretary of State for Administration (2001–2005)
- Janice Eberly, Assistant Secretary of the Treasury for Economic Policy (2011–2013)
- Eric S. Edelman, Under Secretary of Defense for Policy (2005–2009), U.S. Ambassador to Turkey (2003–2005), U.S. Ambassador to Finland (1998–2001) (Republican)
- Albert J. Edmonds, director of the Defense Information Systems Agency (1994–1997)
- Carolyn Ekedahl, Assistant Inspector General for Inspections at the CIA (2001–2005)
- Leandra English, Deputy Director of the Consumer Financial Protection Bureau (2017–2018)
- Diana Farrell, Deputy Director of the National Economic Council (2009–2011)
- Sameera Fazili, Deputy Director of the National Economic Council for Manufacturing, Innovation and Domestic Competition (2021–2022)
- Michèle Flournoy, Under Secretary of Defense for Policy (2009–2012)
- Michael Franken, Director of the Defense POW/MIA Accounting Agency (2015–2017)
- Jendayi Frazer, Assistant Secretary of State for African Affairs (2005–2009), U.S. Ambassador to South Africa (2004–2005) (Republican)
- Aaron Friedberg, deputy assistant to the vice president for National Security (2003–2005)
- Julia Frifield, Assistant Secretary of State for Legislative Affairs (2013–2017)
- Brenda Sue Fulton, Assistant Secretary of Veterans Affairs for Public and Intergovernmental Affairs (2022–2024)
- Bishop Garrison, senior advisor to the U.S. Secretary of Defense (2021–2022)
- Walter E. Gaskin, acting Chair of the NATO Military Committee (2011–2012), Deputy Chair of the NATO Military Committee (2009–2013)
- Bruce L. Gillingham, Surgeon General of the United States Navy (2019–2023)
- James K. Glassman, Under Secretary of State for Public Diplomacy and Public Affairs (2008–2009) (Republican)
- Christy Goldfuss, Chair of the Council on Environmental Quality (2015–2017), deputy director of the National Park Service (2013–2015)
- Maggie Goodlander, Deputy Assistant Attorney General for the Antitrust Division (2021–2024)
- Sherri W. Goodman, Deputy Undersecretary of Defense for Environmental Security (1993–2001)
- Rose Gottemoeller, Deputy Secretary General of NATO (2016–2019), Under Secretary of State for Arms Control and International Security Affairs (2012–2016), Assistant Secretary of State for Verification, Compliance, and Implementation (2009–2014)
- W. Scott Gould, U.S. Deputy Secretary of Veterans Affairs (2009–2013)
- Lee F. Gunn, Naval Inspector General (1997–2000)
- Vanita Gupta, U.S. Associate Attorney General (2021–2024)
- Jimmy Gurulé, Under Secretary of the Treasury for Enforcement (2001–2003), U.S. Assistant Attorney General for the Office of Justice Programs (1990–1992) (Independent)
- Donald J. Guter, Judge Advocate General of the Navy (2000–2002)
- Karen Hanrahan, Deputy Assistant Secretary for Democracy, Human Rights, and Labor (2012–2015)
- Marie Harf, acting Spokesperson for the Department of State (2015)
- Patricia M. Haslach, acting Assistant Secretary of State for Economic and Business Affairs (2017), U.S. Ambassador to Ethiopia (2013–2016), U.S. Ambassador to Laos (2004–2007)
- David J. Hayes, Deputy Secretary of the Interior (1999–2001, 2009–2013)
- John A. Heffern, acting Assistant Secretary of State for European and Eurasian Affairs (2017), U.S. Ambassador to Armenia (2011–2014)
- Fred Hochberg, Deputy Administrator of the Small Business Administration (1998–2001)
- Nathan Hochman, U.S. Assistant Attorney General for the Tax Division (2008–2009) (Independent)
- Michael C. Horowitz, Deputy Assistant Secretary of Defense for Force Development and Emerging Capabilities (2022–2024)
- Kathryn Huff, Assistant Secretary of Energy for Nuclear Energy (2022–2024)
- Karl Inderfurth, Assistant Secretary of State for South Asian Affairs (1997–2001)
- Chris Inglis, National Cyber Director (2021–2023), Deputy Director of the National Security Agency (2006–2014)
- Bobby Ray Inman, acting Chair of the President's Intelligence Advisory Board (1991–1993), Deputy Director of the Central Intelligence Agency (1981–1982), Director of the National Security Agency (1977–1981)
- Deborah Lee James, U.S. Secretary of the Air Force (2013–2017), Assistant Secretary of Defense for Reserve Affairs (1993–1998)
- Nina Jankowicz, executive director of the DHS Disinformation Governance Board (2022)
- Ray Jefferson, Assistant Secretary of Labor for Veterans' Employment and Training (2009–2011)
- Jim Johnson, Under Secretary of the Treasury for Enforcement (1998–2001)
- Gina Ortiz Jones, Under Secretary of the Air Force (2021–2023)
- Colin Kahl, Under Secretary of Defense for Policy (2021–2023)
- Shanthi Kalathil, Deputy Assistant to the President and Coordinator for Democracy and Human Rights at the U.S. National Security Council (2021–2022)
- Mara Karlin, Assistant Secretary of Defense for Strategy, Plans, and Capabilities (2021–2023)
- Neal Katyal, Solicitor General of the United States (2010–2011)
- Gil Kerlikowske, Commissioner of U.S. Customs and Border Protection (2014–2017), Director of the Office of National Drug Control Policy (2009–2014)
- James A. Kelly, Assistant Secretary of State for East Asian and Pacific Affairs (2001–2005) (Republican)
- Frank Klotz, Under Secretary of Energy for Nuclear Security (2014–2018)
- Michael Kostiw, case officer for the Central Intelligence Agency (1971–1981) (Republican)
- Thomas R. Lamont, Assistant Secretary of the Army (Manpower and Reserve Affairs) (2009–2013)
- Alfonso Lenhardt, acting Administrator of the United States Agency for International Development (2015), U.S. Ambassador to Tanzania (2009–2013)
- Suzan G. LeVine, Assistant Secretary of Labor (Employment and Training) (2021), U.S. Ambassador to Switzerland and Liechtenstein (2014–2017), U.S. Ambassador to Egypt (1997–2001)
- Frank Libutti, Under Secretary of Homeland Security for Information Analysis and Infrastructure Protection (2003–2005)
- Letitia Long, Director of the National Geospatial-Intelligence Agency (2010–2014)
- Winston Lord, Assistant Secretary of State for East Asian and Pacific Affairs (1993–1997), U.S. Ambassador to China (1985–1989)
- Frank Lowenstein, Special Envoy for Israeli-Palestinian Negotiations (2014–2017)
- Boris Lushniak, acting Surgeon General of the United States (2013–2014)
- J. Michael Luttig, Assistant Attorney General for the Office of Legal Counsel (1990–1991), Judge of the U.S. Court of Appeals for the Fourth Circuit (1991–2006) (Republican)
- Lester Lyles, Vice Chief of Staff of the United States Air Force (1999–2000)
- Ray Mabus, Secretary of the Navy (2009–2017), U.S. Ambassador to Saudi Arabia (1994–1996), Governor of Mississippi (1988–1992), Auditor of Mississippi (1984–1988)
- Thomas J. Madison Jr., Administrator of the Federal Highway Administration (2008–2009) (Republican)
- Rosario Marin, U.S. Treasurer (2001–2003), Mayor of Huntington Park, California (1999–2000), Member of the Huntington Park, California City Council (1994–2001) (Republican)
- April McClain Delaney, former deputy administrator of the NTIA (2022–2023) and 2024 Democratic nominee for MD-6
- Dennis V. McGinn, Assistant Secretary of the Navy (Energy, Installations and Environment) (2013–2017)
- Brian P. McKeon, Deputy Secretary of State for Management and Resources (2021–2022), acting Under Secretary of Defense for Policy (2016–2017), Principal Deputy Under Secretary of Defense for Policy (2014–2016)
- Evan S. Medeiros, Senior Director for Asian Affairs (2013–2015) and Director for China, Taiwan, Mongolia Affairs (2009–2013) at the National Security Council
- Monica Medina, Assistant Secretary of State for Oceans and International Environmental and Scientific Affairs (2021–2023)
- John Mitnick, General Counsel of the U.S. Department of Homeland Security (2018–2019) (Republican)
- Alberto J. Mora, General Counsel of the Navy (2001–2006), general counsel to the U.S. Information Agency (1989–1993)
- Kenneth P. Moritsugu, U.S. Surgeon General (2002, 2006–2007)
- Patrick Murphy, acting Secretary of the Army (2016), Under Secretary of the Army (2016–2017), U.S. Representative from PA-08 (2007–2011)
- Robert J. Murray, U.S. Under Secretary of the Navy (1980–1981)
- Robert B. Murrett, Director of the National Geospatial-Intelligence Agency (2006–2010)
- Vipin Narang, Assistant Secretary of Defense for Space Policy (2024)
- Brian E. Nelson, Under Secretary of the Treasury for Terrorism and Financial Intelligence (2021–2024)
- Richard Nephew, Department of State Coordinator on Global Anti-Corruption (2022–2024)
- Elizabeth Neumann, DHS Assistant Secretary for Threat Prevention & Security Policy (2018–2020), Deputy Chief of Staff at the DHS (2017–2018), United States Homeland Security Council (2003–2006) (Independent)
- Dava Newman, Deputy Administrator of NASA (2015–2017)
- Thomas R. Nides, Deputy Secretary of State for Management and Resources (2011–2013), U.S. Ambassador to Israel (2021–2023)
- Victoria Nuland, acting Deputy Secretary of State (2023–2024), Under Secretary of State for Political Affairs (2021–2024), Assistant Secretary of State for European and Eurasian Affairs (2013–2017), Spokesperson for the Department of State (2011–2013), U.S. Ambassador to NATO (2005–2008)
- David W. Ogden, Deputy Attorney General (2009–2010), Assistant Attorney General for the Civil Division (1999–2001), Chief of Staff to the Attorney General (1998–1999)
- Sean O'Keefe, Administrator of NASA (2001–2004), Secretary of the Navy (1992–1993) (Republican)
- B. J. Penn, acting U.S. Secretary of the Navy (2009), Assistant Secretary of the Navy for Installations and Environment (2005–2009)
- Thomas J. Perrelli, Associate Attorney General (2009–2012)
- F. Whitten Peters, U.S. Secretary of the Air Force (1997–2001), U.S. Under Secretary of the Air Force (1997–1999)
- Michael Petrucelli, acting Director of the U.S. Citizenship and Immigration Services (2005)
- Robert B. Pirie Jr., acting U.S. Secretary of the Navy (2001), Under Secretary of the Navy (2000–2001), Assistant Secretary of the Navy for Installations and Environment (1994–2000)
- John F. Plumb, Assistant Secretary of Defense for Space Policy (2022–2024)
- John Porcari, Deputy Secretary of Transportation (2009–2013)
- Edward Angus Powell Jr., acting U.S. Deputy Secretary of Veterans Affairs (2000–2001)
- Bharat Ramamurti, Deputy Director of the National Economic Council (2021–2023)
- Jirair Ratevosian, Chief of Staff to the U.S. Global AIDS Coordinator (2022–2023)
- Raymond F. Rees, Deputy Assistant Secretary of the Army for Training, Readiness and Mobilization (2014–2019)
- Victor H. Reis, Assistant Director for National Security and Space in the Office of Science and Technology Policy (1981–1983) (Republican)
- Donald Remy, U.S. Deputy Secretary of Veterans Affairs (2021–2023)
- Ben Rhodes, Deputy National Security Advisor for Strategic Communications (2009–2017)
- Anne C. Richard, Assistant Secretary of State for Population, Refugees, and Migration (2012–2017)
- Charles H. Roadman II, Surgeon General of the United States Air Force (1996–1999)
- John C. Rogers, Deputy Assistant Secretary of Defense (1992–1994)
- Lawrence Romo, Director of the Selective Service System (2009–2017)
- Hannah Rosenthal, Special Envoy for Monitoring and Combating Anti-Semitism (2009–2012)
- Charles O. Rossotti, Commissioner of Internal Revenue (1997–2002)
- Jesse Rothstein, Chief Economist of the U.S. Department of Labor (2010)
- Joel Martin Rubin, Deputy Assistant Secretary of State for House Affairs (2014–2015)
- Sarah Saldaña, Director of the U.S. Immigration and Customs Enforcement (2014–2017), U.S. Attorney for the Northern District of Texas (2011–2014)
- Frank Sánchez, Under Secretary of Commerce for International Trade (2010–2013)
- Kori Schake, Deputy Director of Policy Planning at the U.S. Department of State (2007–2008), Director for Defense Strategy and Requirements on the U.S. National Security Council (2002–2005)
- Lois J. Schiffer, Assistant Attorney General for the Environment and Natural Resources (1993–2001)
- Witney Schneidman, Deputy Assistant Secretary of State for African Affairs (1997–2001)
- Ivan Selin, Chairman of the Nuclear Regulatory Commission (1991–1995), Under Secretary of State for Management (1989–1991)
- Paul J. Selva, Vice Chairman of the Joint Chiefs of Staff (2015–2019)
- Andrew J. Shapiro, Assistant Secretary of State for Political-Military Affairs (2009–2013)
- Wendy Sherman, U.S. Deputy Secretary of State (2021–2023) (acting, 2014–2015), Under Secretary of State for Political Affairs (2011–2015), Counselor of the Department of State (1997–2001), Assistant Secretary of State for Legislative Affairs (1993–1996)
- Heidi Shierholz, Chief Economist of the U.S. Department of Labor (2014–2017)
- Karen Skelton, senior policy advisor at the U.S. Department of Energy (2021–2024)
- Gayle Smith, Administrator of the United States Agency for International Development (2015–2017)
- Matthew Spence, Deputy Assistant Secretary of Defense for the Middle East (2012–2015)
- Steve Spinner, stimulus adviser for the U.S. Department of Energy (2009–2010)
- Clifford L. Stanley, Under Secretary of Defense for Personnel and Readiness (2010–2011)
- Graham Steele, Assistant Secretary of the Treasury for Financial Institutions (2021–2024)
- James Steinberg, Deputy Secretary of State (2009–2011), Deputy National Security Advisor (1996–2000), Director of Policy Planning (1994–1996)
- Todd Stern, United States Special Envoy for Climate Change (2009–2016)
- Betsey Stevenson, Chief Economist of the U.S. Department of Labor (2010–2011)
- Camille Stewart, Deputy National Cyber Director for Technology and Ecosystem Security (2022–2024)
- Kathryn D. Sullivan, Under Secretary of Commerce for Oceans and Atmosphere and Administrator of the National Oceanic and Atmospheric Administration (2013–2017)
- Maura Sullivan, Assistant to the Secretary of Defense for Public Affairs (2015), Assistant Secretary of Veterans Affairs for the Office of Public & Intergovernmental Affairs (2014–2015)
- Nancy Sutley, Chair of the Council on Environmental Quality (2009–2014)
- Deanell Reece Tacha, Judge of the U.S. Court of Appeals for the Tenth Circuit (1985–2011), Chief Judge (2001–2008) (Republican)
- Francis X. Taylor, Under Secretary of Homeland Security for Intelligence and Analysis (2014–2017), Assistant Secretary of State for Diplomatic Security (2002–2005), Coordinator for Counterterrorism (2001–2002), Commander of the Department of the Air Force Office of Special Investigations (1996–2001)
- Miles Taylor, chief of staff of the U.S. Department of Homeland Security (2019) (Forward)
- John Tien, Deputy Secretary of Homeland Security (2021–2023)
- Larry Thompson, U.S. Deputy Attorney General (2001–2003), U.S. Attorney for the Northern District of Georgia (1982–1986) (Republican)
- Gregory F. Treverton, Chair of the National Intelligence Council (2014–2017)
- W. Craig Vanderwagen, Assistant Secretary of Health and Human Services (Preparedness and Response) (2006–2009)
- Harold E. Varmus, Director of the National Cancer Institute (2010–2015), Director of the National Institutes of Health (1993–1999)
- Donald B. Verrilli Jr., Solicitor General of the United States (2011–2016)
- Alexander Vershbow, Deputy Secretary General of NATO (2012–2016), Assistant Secretary of Defense for International Security Affairs (2009–2012), U.S. Ambassador to South Korea (2005–2008), U.S. Ambassador to Russia (2001–2005), U.S. Ambassador to NATO (1997–2001)
- Eugene Vindman, former deputy legal advisor to the U.S. National Security Council (2018–2020) and 2024 Democratic nominee for VA-07
- Mel Watt, Director of the Federal Housing Finance Agency (2014–2019), U.S. Representative from NC-12 (1993–2014)
- Matthew Waxman, Deputy Assistant Secretary of Defense for Detainee Affairs (2004–2005) (Republican)
- Seth P. Waxman, Solicitor General of the United States (1997–2001)
- Andrew C. Weber, Assistant Secretary of Defense for Nuclear, Chemical & Biological Defense Programs (2009–2014)
- Todd A. Weiler, Assistant Secretary of Defense for Manpower and Reserve Affairs (2016–2017)
- Antonio Weiss, Counselor of the U.S. Treasury Secretary (2015–2017)
- J. Robinson West, Assistant Secretary for Policy, Budget, and Administration at the U.S. Department of the Interior (1981–1983)
- Tony West, Associate Attorney General (2012–2014) (Harris's brother-in-law)
- Kayla Williams, Assistant Secretary of Veterans Affairs for Public and Intergovernmental Affairs (2021–2022)
- Elizabeth Wilkins, director of the office of policy planning at the Federal Trade Commission (2022–2023)
- Jon Wolfsthal, Special Assistant to the President for National Security Affairs (2014–2017)
- Lily Batchelder, Assistant Secretary of the Treasury for Tax Policy (2021–2024)
- Lee S. Wolosky, Special Envoy for Guantanamo Closure (2015–2017)
- Robert O. Work, Deputy Secretary of Defense (2014–2017), Under Secretary of the Navy (2009–2013)
- Philip D. Zelikow, Counselor of the United States Department of State (2005–2007) (Republican)
- Cathy Zoi, Assistant Secretary for Energy Efficiency and Renewable Energy at the Department of Energy (2009–2016), CEO of EVgo (2017–2023)
- Ricardo Zúñiga, Special Envoy for the Northern Triangle in the Bureau of Western Hemisphere Affairs (2021–2023)

== See also ==
- List of Donald Trump 2024 presidential campaign endorsements by former federal officials
- List of former Trump administration officials who endorsed Kamala Harris
- List of Kamala Harris 2024 presidential campaign political endorsements
