= LaVerne H. Council =

American government official

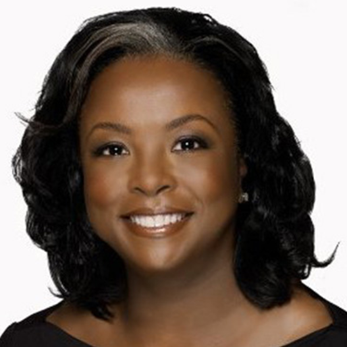
LaVerne H. Council

LaVerne H. Council is a American businesswoman and the former Assistant Secretary for Information and Technology and Chief Information Officer for the Office of Information and Technology within the U.S. Department of Veterans Affairs. Council assumed this role in July 2015. President Obama nominated Council to the role in March 2015. Council was confirmed by the 114th Congress on June 23, 2015, making Council the first female CIO of a Cabinet-level federal agency. She managed a $4.2B Information Technology (IT) appropriation, the first centralized and only IT appropriation in the federal government.

== Education ==
Council received a Bachelor of Science in business from Western Illinois University in 1983. She earned a Master of Business Administration, Operations Management from Illinois State University in 1986. In 2010, she received a Doctorate of Business Administration, honoris causa (Honorary Degree), from Drexel University.

== Career ==
LaVerne H. Council became the national managing principal for Enterprise Digital Strategy and Innovation at Grant Thornton in December, 2017. An equity partner and practice leader entrusted with defining enterprise, digital, and technology effectiveness strategies. She was the Senior Vice President and General Manager for the MITRE Corporation's Public Sector, responsible for managing revenue of $600M+ and developing strategies and innovation priorities for MITRE's federally funded research and development centers (FFRDCs) from April, 2017 through August, 2017. FFRDCs include the Centers for Medicare & Medicaid Services, the Department of Health and Human Services, the Department of Veterans Affairs, the Federal Aviation Administration, the Department of Homeland Security, the Department of the Treasury and Internal Revenue Service, and the Administrative Office of the U.S. Courts, as well as MITRE's International Business. Council served as Senior Advisor and consultant to MITRE through December 2017.

When confirmed as Assistant Secretary for the office of Information and Technology and CIO of the United States Department of Veterans Affairs, the Honorable LaVerne H. Council became the first female CIO of Cabinet-level federal agency, leading over 8,000 employees and 8,000 contractors. She managed a $4.2B Information Technology (IT) appropriation, the first centralized and only IT appropriation in the federal government.

Council delivered VA's first Enterprise Cyber Security Strategy, a comprehensive approach to protect Veteran and employee data. She developed and delivered the IT Enterprise Strategy, a roadmap to transform the technological organization as well as the way in which technology supports VA operations. During her tenure, Council established five pathfinding organizational functions, a strategic communications office, an employee engagement office, and a comprehensive Information Technology Information Library (ITIL) governance board framework.

Before she joined VA, Council was CEO of Council Advisory Services, LLC. From 2006 to 2011, she served as Corporate Vice President and Chief Information Officer for Johnson & Johnson's global Information Technology group, where she managed IT systems for the $61.6 billion worldwide enterprise. She also served as a member of Johnson & Johnson's Corporate Global Operating Committee and her organization included more than 250 operating companies with more than 4,000 IT employees and 7,000 contractors. Prior to her time at Johnson & Johnson, Council was the Global Vice President for Information Technology, Global Business Solutions and Development Services at Dell. She was also a partner at Ernst & Young.

=== Veterans Digital Health Platform ===
While at VA, Council served as technological executive behind the digital health platform for integrated, personalized medicine. She collaborated with the Under Secretary for Health, academia, industry, and the legislative branch to develop the concept and further prove the recommendations would work for the Veteran Health Administration (VHA), the largest integrated healthcare system in the country. This concept is the basis of several digital products in the healthcare arena.

== March of Dimes ==
Council served as Chair of the National Board of Trustees for the March of Dimes since 2011. She reports that working to ensure that more women have healthy pregnancies and healthy babies is a cause that is personal for her because her son Troy was a premature baby. Council has worked to drive support and funding for the March of Dimes Prematurity Research Center at Stanford University School of Medicine, a facility dedicated to the research and prevention of premature birth.

== Awards and achievements ==
- Business Technology Quarterly's Top 5 Best CIOs in America
- Computerworld's Premier 100 I/T Leaders
- Two-time winner of the Department of Veterans Affairs Secretary's Honor Award for I CARE
- Department of Veterans Affairs Meritorious Service Award
- Two time winner of the GoldenGov Federal Executive of the Year Award
- Fedscoop's Top 50 Women in Information Technology
- Top 75 Black Women in Business by Black Enterprise
- PINK Magazine Top 15 Women in Business
- Featured in Chief Supply Chain Officer Insights as one of the top Supply Chain Leaders of the last 20 years
- Ernst & Young Alumni Business Achievement Award
- Featured in New York Times best seller the Right Fight by Saj-Nicole Joni and Damon Beyer
- Global CIO Executive Summit: Top 10 Leader and Innovators
- Inducted into Illinois State University's Business Hall of Fame
- Loyola University's Executive of the Year
- Global CIO Executive Summit: Top 10 Leader and Change Agent
- Featured in CIO Magazine; article entitled The Art of the Deal
- Featured on CNN's Change Artists’ Global Television program
- GITEC Project Management Excellence
- Public Relations Society of America (PRSA), Silver Anvil Award
- AMSUS – Society of the Federal Health Professionals - Award for Information Technology
- Healthcare Data Management's Most Powerful Women in Healthcare Information Technology
- Forbes.com - Technology's Power Women in their Tough, Tech-Smart and Female
- PRSA Thoth Award
- 2013 Phi Beta Sigma Image Award
- New Jersey Technology Council CIO Hall of Fame
- 2009 Global CIO Executive Summit Top 10 Leader and Change Agent
- 2008 Global CIO Executive Summit Top 10 Leader and Innovator
