= Bishop Garrison =

American lawyer (born 1971)

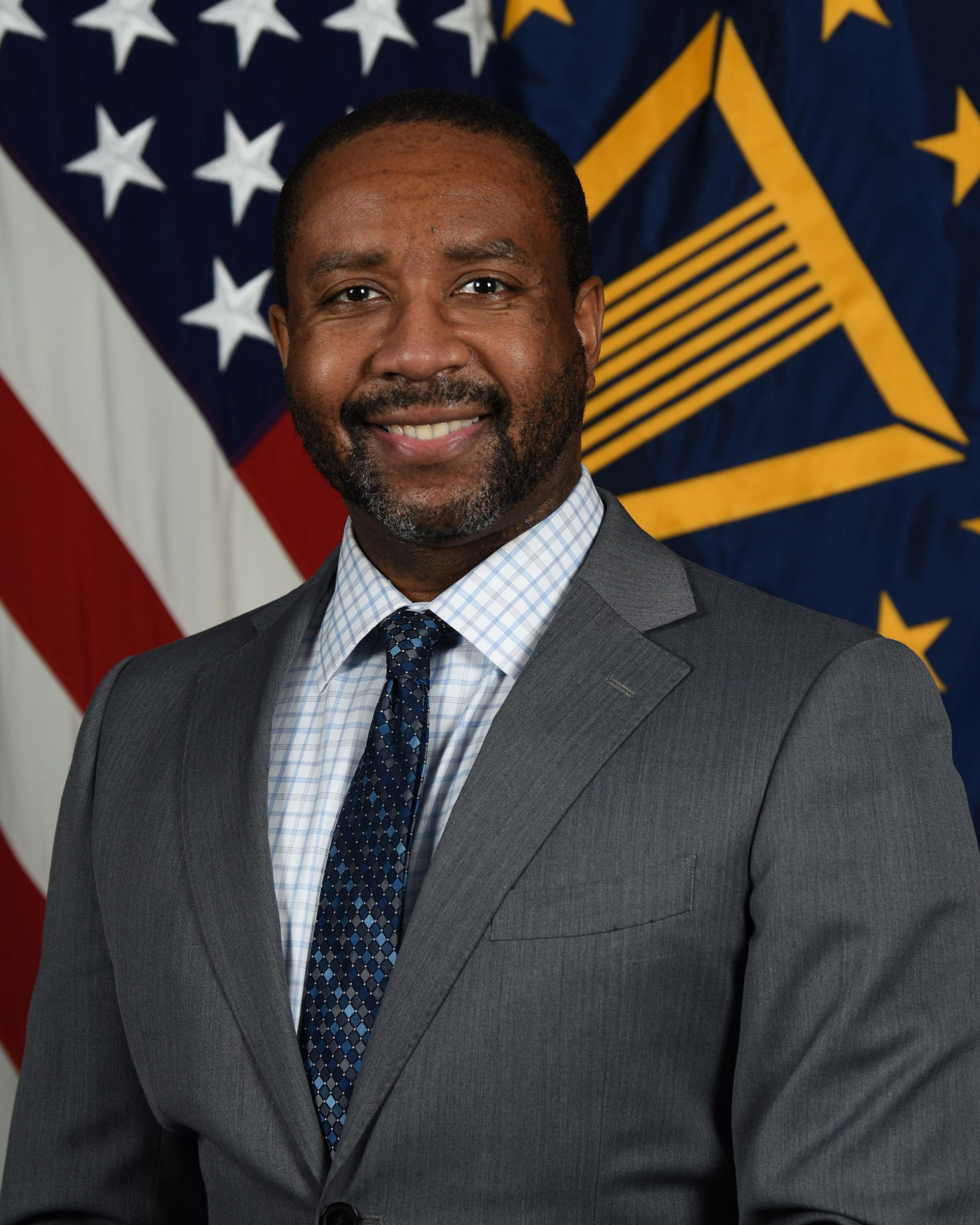

Personal details
- Born: December 26, 1980 (age 45) Lexington, South Carolina
- Party: Democratic
- Education: United States Military Academy (BS); William & Mary Law School (JD)

Bishop Garrison is an American lawyer. He was a senior advisor to the Secretary of Defense and later the acting chief of staff at the Selective Service System under President Joe Biden.

Garrison is currently the vice president of policy at the Intelligence and National Security Alliance.

== Early life and education ==
Bishop Garrison was raised in Lexington, South Carolina. He graduated in 1998 from Lexington High School. Garrison graduated from the US Military Academy in 2002 and was commissioned as an air defense officer.

== Career ==
Garrison served two tours in Operation Iraqi Freedom as a platoon leader and later signal officer with the 3rd Armored Cavalry Regiment. After leaving the military as a captain, Garrison graduated from William & Mary Law School in 2010. After law school, he was a national security consultant.

=== Obama administration ===
Garrison joined the second term of the Obama Administration serving at the Department of Defense as the deputy White House liaison. Later, he served as the White House liaison at the Department of Veterans Affairs. Garrison then was an advisor at the Department of Homeland Security on science and technology.

After leaving the Obama Administration, Garrison worked on the Hillary Clinton campaign as deputy foreign policy advisor. From 2018 to 2019 Garrison served as the interim executive director of the Truman National Security Project. Later, he was the director of national security outreach at Human Rights First.

=== Biden administration ===
From 2021 to 2022, Garrison served in the Biden Administration as the senior advisor to the Secretary of Defense for human capital and diversity, equity, and inclusion. In this role, he advised the Secretary and Deputy Secretary on workforce-related issues including co-leading the development of the first-of-its-kind HBCU consortium University Affiliated Research Center; leading the department’s efforts on extremist activity; and serving as a liaison on sexual assault response and prevention.

== In media ==
Garrison is a frequent commentator on national security issues, especially personnel matters and artificial intelligence.
