= Karen Skelton =

American political strategist and lawyer

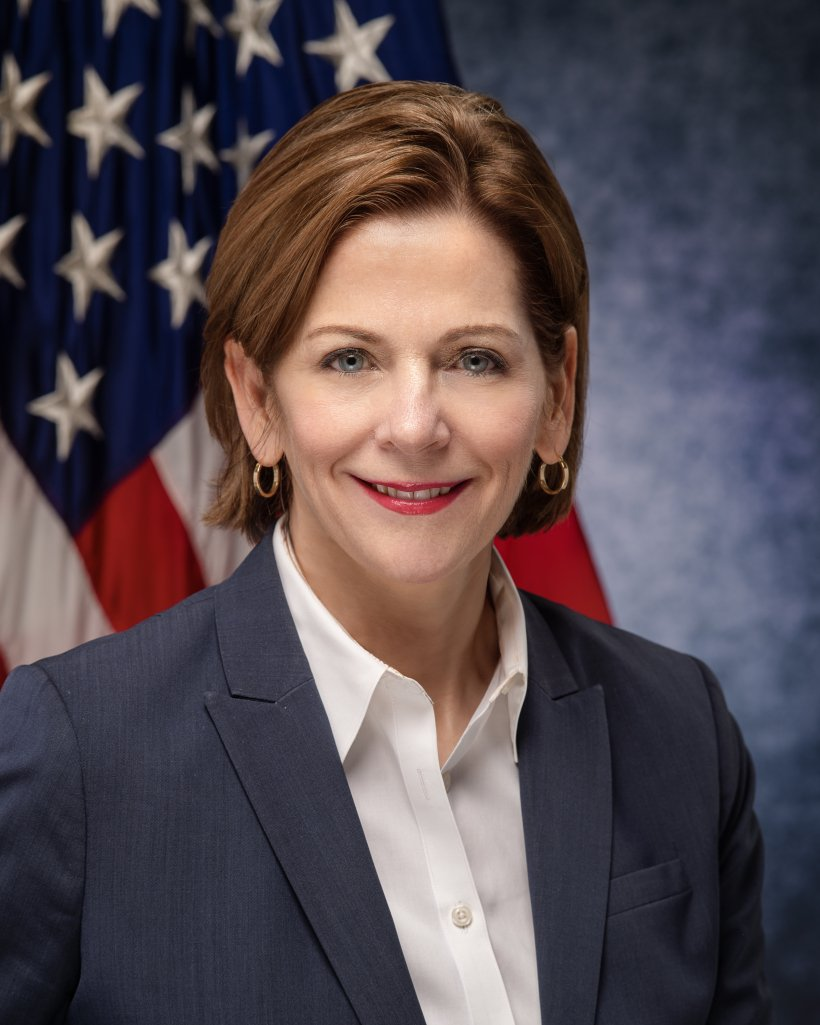
- Karen Skelton's official portrait from the U.S. Department of Energy
- Born: 11 May 1961; U.S.
- Education: University of California, Los Angeles (BD.En); Harvard University's Kennedy School of Government (MD); University of California, Berkeley (JD).
- Occupations: political strategist and lawyer
- Employer(s): Lawyers for a Sustainable Economy (LSE) Initiative; The Shriver Reports; Skelton Strategies; Sacramento Bee; Dewey Square Group the White House; U.S. Department of Energy
- Children: 2

Karen Skelton (born May 11, 1961) is an American political strategist and lawyer working in both national and state politics and public policy issues. Skelton has advised U.S. Presidents, Vice Presidents, U.S. Cabinet Secretaries, Governors, First Ladies, Fortune 100 Corporations, philanthropies, and Board of Directors for 35 years. Most recently, she was named Senior Policy Advisor to Secretary of Energy Jennifer Granholm at the U.S. Department of Energy in the Biden Administration, in addition to Senior Advisor to John Podesta, President Biden's Top Climate Diplomat.

== Political career ==
Skelton has a reputation for working on complex subjects from energy, telecommunications, economic workforce issues and environmental policy across legislative, executive, legal, and regulatory arenas. She worked in the White House during the Biden Administration and the Clinton Administration, the United States Department of Justice, and the Department of Transportation. Skelton has also served as delegate to the Democratic National Convention for Hillary Clinton twice.

In the Biden Administration, Skelton co-led the establishment of the Interagency Working Group on Coal & Power Plant Communities & Economic Revitalization, later responsible for delivering over $170 billion in Federal resources to help revitalize America’s energy communities; organized private and public sector engagement in key states as Congress considered support for the Inflation Reduction Act; and managed a White House effort to build a coalition of philanthropies which have contributed so far over $3 Billion in funds and aligned tables to implement the President’s climate package.

== Private Sector ==
Prior to joining the Biden Administration, Skelton spent a decade as the founder of Skelton Strategies, a policy and political consulting firm working on energy, climate, technology, economic justice, and women’s health. In this role Skelton served as the CEO and managing editor of The Shriver Reports and Coordinating Producer of the Emmy-nominated HBO documentary, Paycheck to Paycheck: The Life and Times of Katrina Gilbert.

Skelton also served as Governor Jerry Brown's Director of Strategic Partnerships at the Global Climate Action Summit, where she drove high-level corporate commitments designed to combat climate change. In this role, Skelton played an integral role in the launch of the Lawyers for a Sustainable Economy (LSE) Initiative, a law firm-led effort now housed at Stanford University delivering $23 million worth of free legal services by the end of 2020 to advance sustainability in energy, transportation, and land use. LSE was announced at the 2018 Global Climate Action Summit in San Francisco, CA in partnership with Former California Governor Jerry Brown and Former California Attorney General Xavier Becerra.

Skelton serves on the Advisory Committee of the Public Policy Institute of California and has served on the National Park Foundation Council and National Advisory Council for the Institute of Governmental Studies at the University of California, Berkeley.

== Publications ==
Skelton has been a guest contributor to the Sacramento Bee, as well as the Huffington Post, and has also been quoted in publications including The New York Times, The Los Angeles Times, and The Atlantic.

== Education ==
Skelton earned her bachelor's degree from the University of California, Los Angeles, where she graduated with honors in English. She then received her master's degree from Harvard University's Kennedy School of Government, and later, a J.D. from the University of California, Berkeley.

== Personal ==
Skelton is the daughter of George Skelton, a political columnist for The Los Angeles Times, and Nancy Skelton, a former political writer and columnist for The Los Angeles Times as well as The Sacramento Bee. Skelton and her husband have two children. Skelton’s daughter Frances, having qualified three times for the national championship, is considered one of the best Candy Crush players in the United States.
