= Witney Schneidman =

Deputy Assistant Secretary of State for African Affairs

Personal details
- Education: PhD
- Alma mater: Temple University, University of Dar es Salaam & University of Southern California
- Occupation: Politician
- Profession: Author

Witney Schneidman is an American author and nonresident senior fellow with the Africa Growth Initiative in the Global Economy and Development program at the Brookings Institution. He served as the Deputy Assistant Secretary of State for Africa in the United States Department of State during the Clinton Administration.

== Education ==
He holds bachelor's degree of art (Cum Laude) from Temple University, Master's Degree of art in international relations from the University of Dar es Salaam, Tanzania and a PhD in international relations from the University of Southern California.

== Career ==
Schneidman has over four decades experience working across sub-Saharan Africa. He began his career as the South Africa analyst in the Bureau of Intelligence and Research at the U.S. State Department. He later shifted to a not-for-profit organization where he supervised compliance by American companies in South Africa with the Sullivan Principles.

Schneidman was a policy advisor to the Vice President for Africa at the World Bank. He worked with a Washington-based consulting firm. He joined the Clinton Administration as Deputy Assistant Secretary of State for African affairs where he was responsible for promoting U.S. business in Africa. After working with U.S. Government, he started his own consulting firm, Schneidman and Associates International.

== Selected publications ==
Schneidman has written extensively on African economic and political issues.

In 2004, Schneidman published: Engaging Africa: Washington and the Fall of Portugal’s Colonial Empire, which Foreign Affairs describes as a “must-read for anyone interested in decolonization or Cold War diplomacy.”

- "Will Biden go to Africa this year?," with Gracelin Baskaran, September 22, 2023, The Brookings Institution.
- "Africa’s Critical Minerals Could Power America’s Green Energy Transition," with Vera Songwe, Foreign Policy, August 3, 2023.
- "How to drive US Investment to Africa," with Gracelin Baskaran, June 14, 2023, The Brookings Institution.
- Diaspora Bonds: An Innovative Source of Financing,” with Admasu Tadesses and Abyssinia Lissanu, May 27, 2022, The Brookings Institution.
- "Will Biden Deliver on his commitment to Africa in 2022?,” January 10, 2022, The Brookings Institution.
