= List of ambassadors appointed by Barack Obama =

This is a list of United States ambassadors appointed by the 44th president of the United States, Barack Obama.

The list includes ambassadors appointed during both his first and second terms.

At the start of his presidency, Obama's team stated that they were aware of the historical target of 70% of ambassador appointments being career diplomats and committed to meeting the target. He met this level during his first.

During his presidency, Obama appointed a total of 416 ambassadors. 291 were career diplomats and 125 were political appointees, for a total of 69.95% being career diplomats.

== Key ==
CD, or career diplomats, denotes ambassadors who were appointed from the U.S. Foreign Service.

PA, or political appointees, denotes ambassadors who were not appointed from the Foreign Service

== Ambassadors to foreign states ==
Office	Ambassador	Background	Assumed office	Left office
Afghanistan	Karl Eikenberry	CD		
Afghanistan	Ryan Crocker	CD		
Afghanistan	James B. Cunningham	CD	August 13, 2012	December 7, 2014
Afghanistan	Michael McKinley	CD	January 6, 2015	December 18, 2016
Albania	Alexander Arvizu	CD	December 6, 2010	January 11, 2015
Albania	Donald Lu	CD	January 13, 2015	September 19, 2018
Algeria	Henry S. Ensher	CD		
Algeria	Joan A. Polaschik	CD	October 29, 2014	April 21, 2017
Angola	Christopher J. McMullen	CD	March 31, 2011	June 12, 2013
Angola	Helen La Lime	CD	July 18, 2014	November 24, 2017
Argentina	Vilma Martinez	PA		
Argentina	Noah Bryson Mamet	PA	January 16, 2015	January 20, 2017
Armenia	John A. Heffern	CD		
Armenia	Richard M. Mills Jr.	CD		
Australia	Jeff Bleich	PA		
Australia	John Berry	PA	September 25, 2013	September 20, 2016
Austria	William C. Eacho III	PA		
Austria	Alexa Lange Wesner	PA	October 22, 2013	January 20, 2017
Azerbaijan	Matthew Bryza	CD		
Azerbaijan	Richard Morningstar	PA		
Azerbaijan	Robert Cekuta	CD	February 19, 2015	March 31, 2018
Bahamas	Nicole Avant	PA		
Bahrain	Thomas C. Krajeski	CD		
Bahrain	William V. Roebuck	CD	January 20, 2015	October 31, 2017
Bangladesh	Dan Mozena	CD		
Bangladesh	Marcia Bernicat	CD	February 4, 2015	November 2, 2018
Barbados and the Eastern Caribbean	Larry Leon Palmer	CD		
Barbados and the Eastern Caribbean	Linda Swartz Taglialatela	CD	February 12, 2016 (Antigua and Barbuda) February 1, 2016 (Barbados) March 2, 2016 (Domenica) February 3, 2016 (Grenada) February 1, 2016 (Saint Kitts and Nevis)	December 27, 2023
Belgium	Howard Gutman	PA		
Belgium	Denise Campbell Bauer	PA	September 26, 2013	January 20, 2017
Belize	Vinai Thummalapally	PA		
Belize	Carlos R. Moreno	PA	June 24, 2014	January 20, 2017
Benin	James Knight	CD		
Benin	Michael A. Raynor	CD		
Benin	Lucy Tamlyn	CD	November 8, 2015	October 19, 2018
Bosnia and Herzegovina	Patrick S. Moon	CD		
Bosnia and Herzegovina	Maureen Cormack	CD	January 16, 2015	January 16, 2019
Botswana	Michelle Gavin	PA		
Botswana	Earl Robert Miller	CD	January 30, 2015	August 11, 2018
Brasil	Thomas A. Shannon Jr.	CD		
Brasil	P. Michael McKinley	CD		
Brasil	Liliana Ayalde	CD	October 31, 2013	January 3, 2017
Brunei	Daniel L. Shields	CD		
Brunei	Craig B. Allen	CD	March 9, 2015	July 20, 2018
Bulgaria	James B. Warlick Jr.	CD		
Bulgaria	Marcie B. Ries	CD		
Bulgaria	Eric S. Rubin	CD	February 24, 2016	July 9, 2019
Burkina Faso	J. Thomas Dougherty	CD		
Burkina Faso	Tulinabo S. Mushingi	CD	September 17, 2013	November 7, 2016
Burkina Faso	Andrew Robert Young	CD	November 20, 2016	March 26, 2020
Burma	Derek J. Mitchell	PA		
Burma	Scot Marciel	CD	April 27, 2016	May 15, 2020
Burundi	Pamela J. H. Slutz	CD		
Burundi	Anne Casper	CD	August 28, 2016	May 5, 2019
Cambodia	William E. Todd	PA		
Cambodia	William A. Heidt	CD	December 2, 2015	November 29, 2018
Cameroon	Robert P. Jackson	CD		
Cameroon	Michael S. Hoza	CD	September 19, 2014	September 11, 2017
Canada	David C. Jacobson	PA		
Canada	Bruce A. Heyman	PA	April 8, 2014	January 18, 2017
Cape Verde	Adrienne S. O'Neal	CD		
Cape Verde	Donald Heflin	CD	January 31, 2015	September 11, 2018
Central African Republic	Laurence D. Wohlers	CD		
Central African Republic	Jeffrey J. Hawkins	CD	October 30, 2015	August 25, 2017
Chad	Mark Boulware	CD		
Chad	James Knight	CD	September 6, 2013	August 11, 2016
Chad	Geeta Pasi	CD	October 6, 2016	September 20, 2018
Chile	Alejandro Daniel Wolff	CD		
Chile	Michael A. Hammer	CD	April 8, 2014	September 20, 2016
Chile	Carol Z. Perez	CD	October 13, 2016	January 25, 2019
China	Gary Locke	PA		
China	Max Baucus	PA	March 20, 2014	January 16, 2017
Colombia	P. Michael McKinley	CD		
Colombia	Kevin Whitaker	CD	May 20, 2014	August 17, 2019
DR Congo	James C. Swan	CD	November 1, 2013	December 31, 2016
Congo	Christopher W. Murray	CD		
Congo	Stephanie S. Sullivan	CD	November 26, 2013	January 20, 2017
Costa Rica	Anne S. Andrew	PA		
Costa Rica	Stafford Fitzgerald Haney	PA	May 28, 2015	July 15, 2017
Croatia	James Brendan Foley	CD		
Croatia	Kenneth H. Merten	CD		
Croatia	Julieta Valls Noyes	CD	October 5, 2015	November 21, 2017
Cyprus	John M. Koenig	CD		
Cyprus	Kathleen A. Doherty	CD	October 7, 2015	January 31, 2019
Czech Republic	Norm Eisen	PA		
Czech Republic	Andrew H. Schapiro	PA	September 30, 2014	January 20, 2017
Denmark	Laurie S. Fulton	PA		
Denmark	Rufus Gifford	PA	September 13, 2013	January 20, 2017
Djibouti	Geeta Pasi	CD		
Djibouti	Thomas P. Kelly III	CD	October 13, 2014	January 15, 2017
Dominican Republic	Raul Yzaguirre	PA		
Dominican Republic	Wally Brewster	PA	December 9, 2013	January 20, 2017
East Timor	Judith Fergin	CD		
East Timor	Karen Clark Stanton	CD	January 16, 2015	December 22, 2017
Ecuador	Adam Namm	CD		
Ecuador	Todd C. Chapman	CD	April 14, 2016	June 8, 2019
Egypt	Anne W. Patterson	CD		
Egypt	R. Stephen Beecroft	CD	February 14, 2015	June 30, 2017
El Salvador	Mari Carmen Aponte	PA		
El Salvador	Jean Elizabeth Manes	CD	March 30, 2016	July 31, 2019
Equatorial Guinea	Alberto M. Fernandez	CD		
Equatorial Guinea	Mark L. Asquino	CD		
Equatorial Guinea	Julie Furuta-Toy	CD	February 11, 2016	February 25, 2019
Estonia	Michael C. Polt	CD		
Estonia	Jeffrey D. Levine	CD		
Estonia	James D. Melville Jr.	CD	December 8, 2015	July 29, 2018
Ethiopia	Donald E. Booth	CD		
Ethiopia	Patricia M. Haslach	CD	September 25, 2013	August 31, 2016
Fiji, Kiribati, Nauru, Tonga, and Tuvalu	C. Steven McGann	CD		
Fiji, Kiribati, Nauru, Tonga, and Tuvalu	Frankie A. Reed	CD		
Fiji, Kiribati, Nauru, Tonga, and Tuvalu	Judith Beth Cefkin	CD	February 3, 2015 (Fiji) February 23, 2015 (Kiribati) August 12, 2015 (Nauru) April 22, 2015 (Tonga) May 12, 2015 (Tuvalu)	February 25, 2018
Finland	Bruce J. Oreck	PA		
Finland	Charles C. Adams Jr.	PA	December 8, 2015	January 20, 2017
France and Monaco	Charles Rivkin	PA		
France and Monaco	Jane D. Hartley	PA	October 31, 2014 (France) November 5, 2014 (Monaco)	January 29, 2017 (France) January 19, 2017 (Monaco)
Gabon and São Tomé and Príncipe	Eric D. Benjaminson	CD		
Gabon and São Tomé and Príncipe	Cynthia Akuetteh	CD	December 26, 2014 (Gabon) April 10, 2015 (São Tomé and Príncipe)	February 26, 2018
Gambia	Pamela White	CD		
Gambia	Edward M. Alford	CD		
Gambia	Patricia Alsup	CD	January 13, 2016	September 22, 2018
Georgia	John R. Bass	CD		
Georgia	Richard B. Norland	CD		
Georgia	Ian C. Kelly	CD	September 17, 2015	March 24, 2018
Germany	Phil Murphy	PA		
Germany	John B. Emerson	PA	August 26, 2013	January 20, 2017
Ghana	Gene A. Cretz	CD		
Ghana	Robert P. Jackson	CD	February 4, 2016	July 28, 2018
Greece	Daniel Bennett Smith	CD	September 28, 2010	August 5, 2013
Greece	David D. Pearce	CD	October 17, 2013	September 16, 2016
Greece	Geoffrey R. Pyatt	CD	September 30, 2016	May 10, 2022
Guatemala	Arnold A. Chacon	CD		
Guatemala	Todd D. Robinson	CD	October 27, 2014	September 20, 2017
Guinea	Patricia Moller	CD		
Guinea	Alexander M. Laskaris	CD		
Guinea	Dennis B. Hankins	CD	November 25, 2015	January 29, 2019
Guyana	Brent Hardt	CD		
Guyana	Perry L. Holloway	CD	October 2, 2015	December 9, 2018
Haiti	Kenneth H. Merten	CD		
Haiti	Pamela White	CD		
Haiti	Peter F. Mulrean	CD	October 6, 2015	February 27, 2017
Holy See	Miguel H. Diaz	PA		
Holy See	Ken Hackett	PA	October 21, 2013	January 20, 2017
Honduras	Lisa Kubiske	CD		
Honduras	James Nealon	CD	September 25, 2014	September 30, 2017
Hungary	Eleni Tsakopoulos Kounalakis	PA		
Hungary	Colleen Bradley Bell	PA	January 21, 2015	January 20, 2017
Iceland	Luis E. Arreaga	CD		
Iceland	Robert C. Barber	PA	January 28, 2015	January 20, 2017
India	Tim Roemer	PA		
India	Nancy Jo Powell	CD		
India	Richard R. Verma	PA		January 20, 2017
Indonesia	Joseph R. Donovan Jr.	CD		
Indonesia	Robert O. Blake Jr.	CD		
Indonesia	Scot Marciel	CD		
Iraq	Christopher R. Hill	CD		
Iraq	James Franklin Jeffrey	CD		
Iraq	Robert S. Beecroft	CD		
Iraq	Stuart E. Jones	CD		
Iraq	Douglas Silliman	CD		
Ireland	Dan M. Rooney	PA		
Ireland	Kevin O'Malley	PA		
Israel	Daniel B. Shapiro	PA	August 3, 2011 (holdover)	January 20, 2017
Italy and San Marino	David H. Thorne	PA		
Italy and San Marino	John R. Phillips	PA	October 2, 2013 (Italy) February 19, 2014 (San Marino)	January 18, 2017
Jamaica	Pamela Bridgewater	CD		
Jamaica	Luis G. Moreno	CD		
Japan	John Roos	PA		
Japan	Caroline Kennedy	PA		
Jordan	Stuart E. Jones	CD		
Jordan	Alice Wells	CD		
Kazakhstan	Kenneth J. Fairfax	CD		
Kazakhstan	George A. Krol	CD		
Kenya	Scott Gration	PA		
Kenya	Robert F. Godec	CD		
South Korea	Sung Y. Kim	CD		
South Korea	Mark W. Lippert	PA		
Kosovo	Christopher Dell	CD		
Kosovo	Tracey Ann Jacobson	CD		
Kosovo	Greg Delawie	CD		
Kuwait	Lawrence R. Silverman	CD		
Kuwait	Matthew Tueller	CD		
Kyrgyzstan	Pamela Spratlen	CD		
Kyrgyzstan	Sheila Gwaltney	CD		
Laos	Karen B. Stewart	CD		
Laos	Daniel A. Clune	CD		
Laos	Rena Bitter	CD		
Latvia	Judith G. Garber	CD		
Latvia	Mark A. Pekala	CD		
Latvia	Nancy B. Pettit	CD		
Lebanon	Maura Connelly	CD		
Lebanon	David Hale	CD		
Lebanon	Elizabeth H. Richard	CD		
Lesotho	Michele Thoren Bond	CD		
Lesotho	Matthew T. Harrington	CD		
Liberia	Deborah R. Malac	CD		
Liberia	Christine A. Elder	CD		
Libya	Gene A. Cretz	CD		
Libya	J. Christopher Stevens	CD		
Libya	Deboray Kay Jones	CD		
Libya	Peter W. Bodde	CD		
Lithuania	Anne E. Derse	CD		
Lithuania	Deborah McCarthy	CD		
Lithuania	Anne Hall	CD		
Luxembourg	Cynthia Stroum	PA		
Luxembourg	Robert A. Mandell	PA		
Luxembourg	David McKean	PA	April 14, 2016	January 20, 2017
Macedonia	Paul D. Wohlers	CD		
Macedonia	Jess L. Baily	CD		
Madagascar (and Comoros)	Robert T. Yamate	CD	January 14, 2015 (Madagascar) February 3, 2015 (Comoros)	April 1, 2018
Malawi	Jeanine E. Jackson	CD		
Malawi	Virginia E. Palmer	CD		
Malaysia	Paul W. Jones	CD		
Malaysia	Joseph Y. Yun	CD		
Malaysia	Kamala Shirin Lakhdhir	CD		
Mali	Mary Beth Leonard	CD		
Mali	Paul A. Folmsbee	CD		
Malta	Douglas Kmiec	PA		
Malta	Gina Abercrombie-Winstanley	CD		
Malta	G. Kathleen Hill	CD		
Marshall Islands	Martha L. Campbell	CD		
Marshall Islands	Thomas H. Armbruster	CD		
Marshall Islands	Karen B. Stewart	CD		
Mauritania	Jo Ellen Powell	CD		
Mauritania	Larry Andre Jr.	CD		
Mauritius & Seychelles	Shari Villarosa	CD		
Mauritius & Seychelles	Mary Jo Wills	CD		
Mexico	Carlos Pascual	PA		
Mexico	Earl Anthony Wayne	CD		
Mexico	Roberta S. Jacobson	PA		
Micronesia	Peter A. Prahar	CD		
Micronesia	Dorothea-Maria Rosen	CD		
Micronesia	Robert A. Riley III	CD		
Moldova	William H. Moser	CD		
Moldova	James D. Pettit	CD		
Mongolia	Jonathan Addleton	CD		
Mongolia	Piper Campbell	CD		
Mongolia	Jennifer Zimdahl Galt	CD		
Montenegro	Sue K. Brown	CD		
Montenegro	Margaret A. Uyehara	CD		
Morocco	Samuel L. Kaplan	PA		
Morocco	Dwight L. Bush Sr.	PA	March 31, 2014	January 20, 2017
Mozambique	Leslie V. Rowe	CD		
Mozambique	Douglas M. Griffiths	CD		
Mozambique	H. Dean Pittman	CD		
Namibia	Wanda Nesbitt	CD		
Namibia	Thomas F. Daughton	CD		
Nepal	Scott H. DeLisi	CD		
Nepal	Peter W. Bodde	CD		
Nepal	Alaina B. Teplitz	CD		
Netherlands	Fay Hartog-Levin	PA		
Netherlands	Timothy M. Broas	PA	March 19, 2014	February 13, 2016
New Zealand & Samoa	David Huebner	PA		
New Zealand & Samoa	Mark D. Gilbert	PA	February 9, 2015	January 20, 2017
Nicaragua	Phyllis M. Powers	CD		
Nicaragua	Laura Farnsworth Dogu	CD		
Niger	Bisa Williams	CD		
Niger	Eunice Reddick	CD		
Nigeria	Terence McCulley	CD		
Nigeria	James F. Entwistle	CD		
Nigeria	Stuart Symington	CD		
Norway	Barry B. White	PA		
Norway	Samuel D. Heins	PA	March 10, 2016	January 12, 2017
Oman	Richard Schmierer	CD		
Oman	Greta C. Holtz	CD		
Oman	Marc Jonathan Sievers	CD		
Pakistan	Cameron Munter	CD		
Pakistan	Richard G. Olson	CD		
Pakistan	David Hale	CD		
Palau	Helen Reed-Rowe	CD		
Palau	Amy J. Hyatt	CD		
Panama	Phyllis M. Powers	CD		
Panama	Jonathan D. Farrar	CD		
Panama	John D. Feeley	CD		
Papua New Guinea, Solomon Islands, and Vanuatu	Teddy B. Taylor	CD		
Papua New Guinea, Solomon Islands, and Vanuatu	Walter E. North	CD		
Papua New Guinea, Solomon Islands, and Vanuatu	Catherine Ebert-Gray	CD		
Paraguay	James H. Thessin	CD		
Paraguay	Leslie A. Bassett	CD		
Peru	Rose M. Likins	CD		
Peru	Brian A. Nichols	CD		
Philippines	Harry K. Thomas Jr.	CD		
Philippines	Philip S. Goldberg	CD		
Philippines	Sung Y. Kim	CD		
Poland	Lee A. Feinstein	PA		
Poland	Stephen D. Mull	CD		
Poland	Paul W. Jones	CD		
Portugal	Allan J. Katz	PA		
Portugal	Robert A. Sherman	PA	May 3, 2014	January 20, 2017
Qatar	Susan L. Ziadeh	CD		
Qatar	Dana Shell Smith	CD		
Romania	Mark Gitenstein	PA		
Romania	Hans G. Klemm	CD		
Russia	Michael McFaul	PA		
Russia	John F. Tefft	CD		
Rwanda	Donald W. Koran	CD		
Rwanda	Erica Barks-Ruggles	CD		
Saudi Arabia	Joseph W. Westphal	PA		
Saudi Arabia	James B. Smith	PA		
Senegal and Guinea‑Bissau	James P. Zumwalt	CD	February 3, 2015 (Senegal) March 10, 2015 (Guinea‑Bissau)	January 28, 2017
Senegal and Guinea‑Bissau	Lewis Lukens	CD		
Serbia	Kyle Randolph Scott	CD		
Serbia	Michael David Kirby	CD		
Serbia	Mary B. Warlick	CD		
Sierra Leone	John Hoover	CD		
Sierra Leone	Michael S. Owen	CD		
Singapore	Kirk Wagar	PA	September 25, 2013	January 20, 2017
Singapore	David I. Adelman	PA		
Slovakia	Adam H. Sterling	CD		
Slovakia	Thomas Sedgwick	PA		
Slovenia	Brent Robert Hartley	CD		
Slovenia	Joseph A. Mussomeli	CD		
Somalia	Stephen Michael Schwartz	CD		
South Africa	Patrick Gaspard	PA		
South Africa	Donald Gips	PA		
South Sudan	Mary Catherine Phee	CD		
South Sudan	Susan D. Page	PA		
Spain and Andorra	Alan Solomont	PA		
Spain and Andorra	James Costos	PA	September 24, 2013 (Spain) April 4, 2014 (Andorra)	January 18, 2017
Sri Lanka and Maldives	Patricia A. Butenis	CD		
Sri Lanka and Maldives	Michele J. Sison	CD		
Sri Lanka and Maldives	Atul Keshap	CD		
Suriname	Edwin Richard Nolan Jr.	CD		
Suriname	Jay N. Anania	CD		
Suriname	John R. Nay	CD		
Swaziland	Earl Michael Irving	CD		
Swaziland	Makila James	CD		
Swaziland	Lisa J. Peterson	CD	November 25, 2015	February 5, 2016
Sweden	Azita Raji	PA	March 15, 2016	January 20, 2017
Sweden	Mark Brzezinski	PA		
Sweden	Matthew Barzun	PA		
Switzerland and Liechtenstein	Suzan G. LeVine	PA	July 1, 2014 (Switzerland) June 26, 2014 (Liechtenstein)	January 20, 2017
Switzerland and Liechtenstein	Donald S. Beyer	PA		
Tajikistan	Elisabeth I. Millard	CD		
Tajikistan	Susan M. Elliott	CD		
Tajikistan	Kenneth E. Gross Jr.	CD		
Tanzania	Mark B. Childress	PA		
Tanzania	Alfonso Lenhardt	PA		
Thailand	Glyn T. Davies	CD		
Thailand	Kristie Kenney	CD		
Timor-Leste	Karen Clark Stanton	CD		
Timor-Leste	Judith Fergin	CD		
Togo	David R. Gilmour	CD		
Togo	Robert E. Whitehead	CD		
Trinidad and Tobago	John L. Estrada	PA		
Trinidad and Tobago	Beatrice W. Welters	PA		
Tunisia	Daniel Rubinstein	CD		
Tunisia	Jacob Walles	CD		
Tunisia	Gordon Gray III	CD		
Turkey	John R. Bass	CD		
Turkey	Francis J. Ricciardone Jr.	CD		
Turkmenistan	Allan Mustard	CD		
Turkmenistan	Robert E. Patterson Jr.	CD		
Uganda	Deborah R. Malac	CD		
Uganda	Scott H. DeLisi	CD		
Uganda	Jerry P. Lanier	CD		
Ukraine	Marie Yovanovitch	CD		
Ukraine	Geoffrey R. Pyatt	CD		
Ukraine	John F. Tefft	CD		
United Arab Emirates	Barbara A. Leaf	CD		
United Arab Emirates	Michael H. Corbin	CD		
United Kingdom	Louis Susman	PA		
United Kingdom	Matthew Winthrop Barzun	PA	December 4, 2013	January 18, 2017
Uruguay	Kelly Keiderling‑Franz	CD		
Uruguay	Julissa Reynoso	PA		
Uruguay	David D. Nelson	CD		
Uzbekistan	Pamela L. Spratlen	CD		
Uzbekistan	George A. Krol	CD		
Vietnam	Ted Osius	CD		
Vietnam	David B. Shear	CD		
Yemen	Matthew Tueller	CD		
Yemen	Gerald M. Feierstein	CD		
Zambia	Eric T. Schultz	CD		
Zambia	Mark C. Storella	CD		
Zimbabwe	Harry K. Thomas Jr.	CD		
Zimbabwe	D. Bruce Wharton	CD		
Zimbabwe	Charles A. Ray	CD		

== Ambassadors to international organizations ==
Office	Ambassador	Background	Assumed office	Left office
ICAO	Michael Anderson Lawson	PA		
ICAO	Duane Woerth	PA		
UNESCO	Crystal Nix-Hines	PA		
UNESCO	David T. Killion	PA		
Office of the U.N. And Other International Organizations in Geneva	Pamela Hamamoto	PA		
Office of the U.N. And Other International Organizations in Geneva	Betty E. King	PA		
UN Human Rights Council	Keith Michael Harper	PA		
UN Human Rights Council	Peter Mulrean	CD		
UN Human Rights Council	Eileen Donahoe	PA		
UN Economic and Social Council	Sarah E. Mendelson	PA		
UN Economic and Social Council	Elizabeth M. Cousens	PA		
UN Management and Reform	Isobel Coleman	PA		
UN Management and Reform	Joe Torsella	PA		
UN Political Affairs	David Pressman	PA		
UN Political Affairs	Jeffrey DeLaurentis	CD		
UN / Conference on Disarmament	Robert A. Wood	CD		
UN / Conference on Disarmament	Laura E. Kennedy	CD		
UN / Rome	David J. Lane	PA		
UN / Rome	Ertharin Cousin	PA		
UN / Vienna (IAEA)	Laura Holgate	PA		
United Nations	Samantha Power	PA		
United Nations	Susan Rice	PA		
European Union	Anthony L. Gardner	PA		
European Union	William Kennard	PA		
NATO	Douglas Lute	PA		
NATO	Ivo H. Daalder	PA		
Organization of American States	Carmen Lomellin	PA		
Organisation for Economic Co-operation and Development	Daniel Yohannes	PA		
Organisation for Economic Co-operation and Development	Karen Kornblum	PA		
OSCE	Dan Baer	PA		
OSCE	Ian C. Kelly	CD		
African Union	Mary Beth Leonard	CD		
African Union	Reuben Brigety	PA		
African Union	Michael Battle	PA		
U.S. Trade Representative	Ron Kirk	PA	March 18, 2009	March 15, 2013
U.S. Trade Representative	Michael Froman	PA	June 21, 2013	January 20, 2017

== Unsuccessful nominations ==
Office	Nominee	Background	Nominated	Nomination terminated
Norway	George J. Tsunis	PA	September 10, 2013	December 2014
