= List of ambassadors of the United States to the Solomon Islands =

Ambassador of the United States to Solomon Islands
- Seal of the United States Department of State

- Flag of a United States ambassador
- Incumbent; Alex M. Berenberg; Chargé d'affaires since January 17, 2026
- Nominator: The president of the United States
- Inaugural holder: Paul Fisher Gardner as Envoy Extraordinary and Minister Plenipotentiary.
- Formation: July 7, 1978
- Website: U.S. Embassy - Port Moresby

The United States of America opened an embassy in Honiara, Solomon Islands from July 7, 1978, following recognition of the independent Solomon Islands by the United States, but this closed in 1993, reopening on 2 February 2023. During the ten-year closure, U.S. interests in Solomon Islands were handled by the United States Embassy in Port Moresby, Papua New Guinea, the United States Ambassador to Papua New Guinea being also accredited to Solomon Islands.

== Ambassadors ==
Name	Title	Appointed	Terminated mission	Notes
Mary S. Olmsted – Career FSO	Envoy Extraordinary and Minister Plenipotentiary	January 5, 1976	July 28, 1979	
Harvey J. Feldman – Career FSO	Envoy Extraordinary and Minister Plenipotentiary	September 26, 1979	May 25, 1981	
M. Virginia Schafer – Career FSO	Envoy Extraordinary and Minister Plenipotentiary	November 3, 1981	May 20, 1984	
Paul Fisher Gardner – Career FSO	Envoy Extraordinary and Minister Plenipotentiary	September 7, 1984	October 1, 1986	
Everett E. Bierman – Career FSO	Envoy Extraordinary and Minister Plenipotentiary	November 11, 1986	October 30, 1989	
Robert William Farrand – Career FSO	Envoy Extraordinary and Minister Plenipotentiary	May 1, 1990	September 13, 1993	
Richard W. Teare – Career FSO	Envoy Extraordinary and Minister Plenipotentiary	November 23, 1993	July 14, 1996	
Arma Jane Karaer – Career FSO	Envoy Extraordinary and Minister Plenipotentiary	April 15, 1997	May 28, 2000	
Susan S. Jacobs – Career FSO	Envoy Extraordinary and Minister Plenipotentiary	November 7, 2000	August 1, 2003	
Robert W. Fitts – Career FSO	Envoy Extraordinary and Minister Plenipotentiary	September 11, 2003	September 5, 2006	
Leslie V. Rowe – Career FSO	Envoy Extraordinary and Minister Plenipotentiary	November 15, 2006	July 11, 2009	
Teddy B. Taylor – Career FSO	Envoy Extraordinary and Minister Plenipotentiary	November 16, 2009	October 6, 2012	
Walter E. North – Career FSO	Envoy Extraordinary and Minister Plenipotentiary	January 31, 2013	January 26, 2016	
Catherine Ebert-Gray – Career FSO	Envoy Extraordinary and Minister Plenipotentiary	April 14, 2016	November 17, 2019	
Erin Elizabeth McKee – Career FSO	Envoy Extraordinary and Minister Plenipotentiary	January 27, 2020	April 14, 2022	
Russell Comeau - Career FSO	Chargé d'Affaires ad interim	February 2, 2023	March 14, 2024	US Embassy reopened on February 2, 2023
Ann M. Yastishock - Career FSO	Ambassador Extraordinary and Plenipotentiary	November 29, 2023	March 14, 2024	January 16, 2026

== See also ==
- Solomon Islands – United States relations
- Foreign relations of Solomon Islands
- Ambassadors of the United States
