= List of ambassadors of the United States to Vanuatu =

Ambassador of the United States to Vanuatu
- Seal of the United States Department of State

- Flag of a United States ambassador
- Incumbent; Alex M. Berenberg; Chargé d'affaires since January 17, 2026
- Nominator: The president of the United States
- Inaugural holder: Paul Fisher Gardner as Envoy Extraordinary and Minister Plenipotentiary.
- Formation: September 1986
- Website: U.S. Embassy - Port Moresby

Diplomatic presence of the United States of America in Vanuatu began in September 1986 when the latter established diplomatic ties with U.S. The United States Embassy in Port Moresby, Papua New Guinea handles the U.S. interests in Vanuatu. In addition to Papua New Guinea, United States Ambassador to Papua New Guinea is accredited to both Vanuatu and Solomon Islands.

== Ambassadors ==
Name	Title	Appointed	Presented credentials	Terminated mission
Paul Fisher Gardner – Career FSO	Envoy Extraordinary and Minister Plenipotentiary	September 7, 1984		October 1, 1986
Everett E. Bierman	Envoy Extraordinary and Minister Plenipotentiary	March 13, 1987	April 10, 1987	October 30, 1989
Robert William Farrand – Career FSO	Envoy Extraordinary and Minister Plenipotentiary	March 8, 1990	June 25, 1990	September 13, 1993
Richard W. Teare – Career FSO	Envoy Extraordinary and Minister Plenipotentiary	October 8, 1993	July 11, 1994	July 14, 1996
Arma Jane Karaer – Career FSO	Envoy Extraordinary and Minister Plenipotentiary	February 10, 1997	April 15, 1997	May 28, 2000
Susan S. Jacobs – Career FSO	Envoy Extraordinary and Minister Plenipotentiary	June 14, 2000	November 29, 2000	August 1, 2003
Robert W. Fitts – Career FSO	Envoy Extraordinary and Minister Plenipotentiary	July 1, 2003	October 3, 2003	October 2, 2006
Leslie V. Rowe – Career FSO	Envoy Extraordinary and Minister Plenipotentiary	July 5, 2006	December 7, 2006	July 11, 2009
Teddy B. Taylor – Career FSO	Envoy Extraordinary and Minister Plenipotentiary	August 12, 2009	February 2, 2010	October 6, 2012
Walter North – Career FSO	Envoy Extraordinary and Minister Plenipotentiary	September 27, 2012	February 19, 2013	January 22, 2016
Catherine Ebert-Gray – Career FSO	Envoy Extraordinary and Minister Plenipotentiary	December 15, 2015	July 5, 2016	November 17, 2019
Erin Elizabeth McKee – Career FSO	Envoy Extraordinary and Minister Plenipotentiary	September 30, 2019	January 27, 2020	April 14, 2022
Ann M. Yastishock - Career FSO	Envoy Extraordinary and Minister Plenipotentiary	November 29, 2023	April 16, 2024	January 16, 2026

== See also ==
- United States – Vanuatu relations
- Foreign relations of Vanuatu
- Ambassadors of the United States
