= Tough love (disambiguation) =

Tough love is a term used in behaviour modification.

Tough Love may also refer to:

== Books ==
- Tough Love: My Story of the Things Worth Fighting For, a 2019 non-fiction book by Susan Rice
- Tough Love (novel), by Kerry Katona
- Tough Love: High School Confidential, a graphic novel by Abby Denson

== Film, TV, and radio ==
- Toughlove, a 1985 television film starring Lee Remick
- Tough Love (2015 film), a German film
- Tough Love (2017 film), a Nigerian film
- Tough Love (TV series), a 2009–2013 reality television series on VH1
- Tough Love (web series), a 2015 web series
- Tough Love, the title of the 2000 first series of the British television show Lenny Blue
- "Tough Love" (Buffy the Vampire Slayer), a 2001 episode of Buffy the Vampire Slayer
- ToughLove (radio program), a 2005-6 Australian radio program
- Tough Love with Hilary Farr, a 2021–present HGTV home design show

== Music ==
- Tough Love (duo), a British dance music duo

=== Albums ===
- Tough Love (Magic Dirt album), 2003
- Tough Love, a 2009 album by Gala
- Tough Love: Best of the Ballads, a 2011 compilation album by Aerosmith
- Tough Love (Pulled Apart by Horses album), 2012
- Tough Love (Jessie Ware album), 2014
- Tough Love (Nessa Barrett album), 2026

=== Extended plays ===
- Tough Love (Teddy Swims EP), 2022
- Tough Love (Onew EP), 2026

=== Songs ===
- "Tough Love" (Avicii song), a song by Avicii from the album Tim, 2019
- "Tough Love" (Jessie Ware song), a song by Jessie Ware, 2014
- "Tough Love", a song by Chris Brown from Heartbreak on a Full Moon, 2017
- "Tough Love", a song by Gracie Abrams from The Secret of Us
- "Tough Love", a song by Squeeze from Babylon and On, 1987
- "Tough Love", a song by Suzie McNeil from album Dear Love, 2012
- "Tough Love", a song by The Law from The Law
