= Erin Elizabeth McKee =

American diplomat

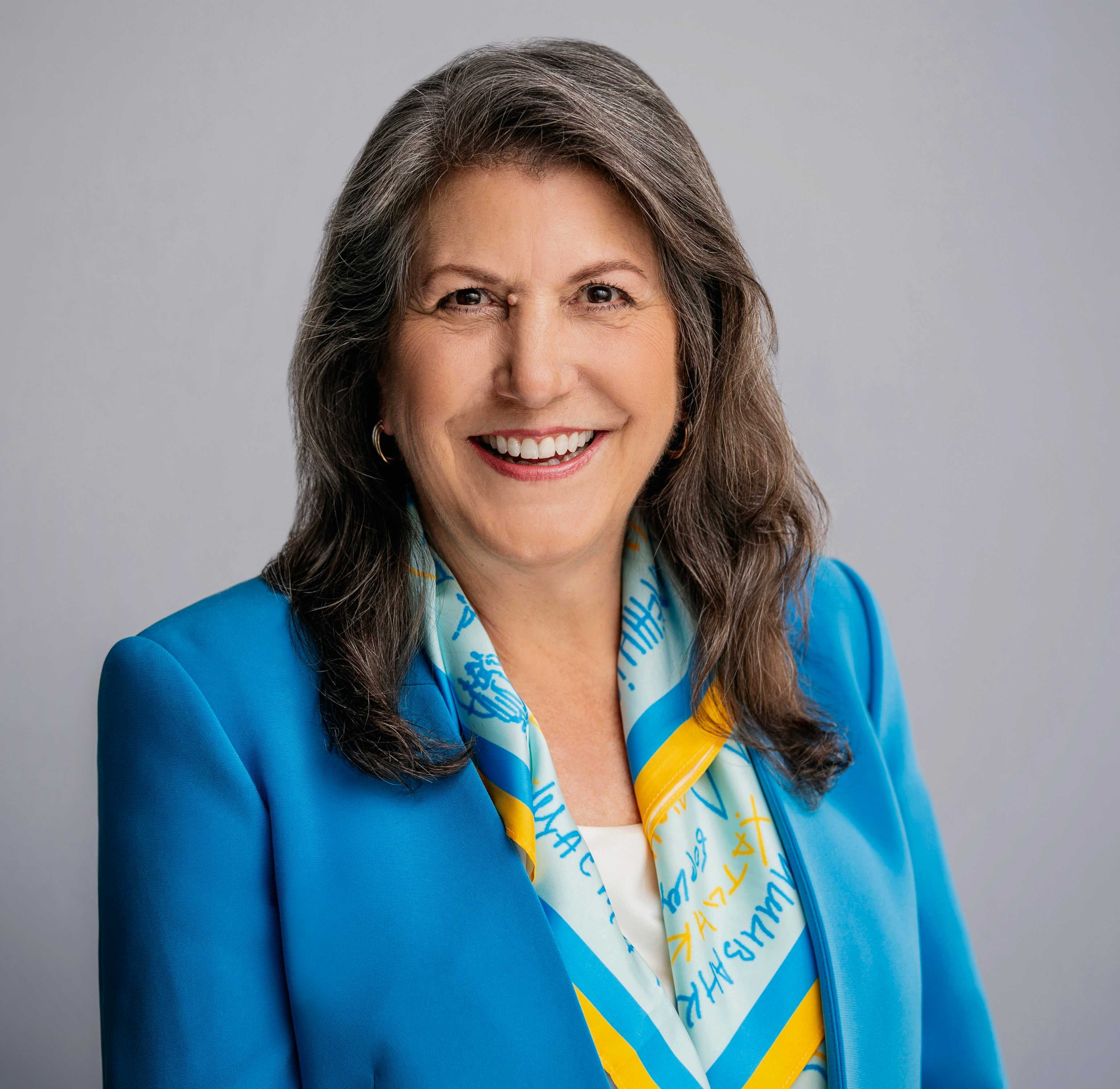
- Official portrait, 2022

CEO of Nova Ukraine
- Incumbent
- Assumed office August 20, 2025

Assistant Administrator of the United States Agency for International Development for Europe and Eurasia
- In office April 29, 2022 – January 20, 2025
- President: Joe Biden
- Preceded by: Brock Bierman

United States Ambassador to Papua New Guinea United States Ambassador to Vanuatu
- In office November 27, 2019 – April 14, 2022
- President: Donald Trump; Joe Biden
- Preceded by: Catherine Ebert-Gray
- Succeeded by: Ann M. Yastishock

United States Ambassador to the Solomon Islands
- In office January 27, 2020 – April 14, 2022
- President: Donald Trump; Joe Biden
- Preceded by: Catherine Ebert-Gray

Personal details
- Education: University of California, Davis (B.A.); University of Washington (M.A.)

Erin Elizabeth McKee is an American diplomat who served as assistant administrator of the United States Agency for International Development for Europe and Eurasia from 2022 to 2025. She served as the United States Ambassador to Papua New Guinea, Solomon Islands and Vanuatu from 2019 to 2022, following her appointment by President Donald Trump. As of August 2025, McKee is the CEO of Nova Ukraine, a California-based international nonprofit that provides aid and services to people in Ukraine.

== Early life and education ==
McKee is from California. She earned a Bachelor of Arts from the University of California, Davis, and a Master of Arts from University of Washington.

== Career ==
=== Private sector ===
McKee early in her career worked for Morrison–Knudsen, Inc.'s international mining division in the former Soviet Union. She then served as general manager and then executive director for Capital Investment Group's (CIG) Russia operations.

=== Government service ===
McKee joined the U.S. Foreign Service in 1995. McKee then served at USAID Missions in Kazakhstan, Iraq, Peru, Bolivia, Israel, and Russia. She later became Senior Deputy Assistant Administrator and Chief Human Capital Officer in the USAID Office of Human Capital and Talent Management, and Senior Deputy Assistant Administrator for the Bureau of Policy, Planning, and Learning at USAID headquarters in Washington, D.C. Before becoming ambassador, McKee was Mission Director of the United States Agency for International Development (USAID) in Indonesia.

=== Nova Ukraine ===
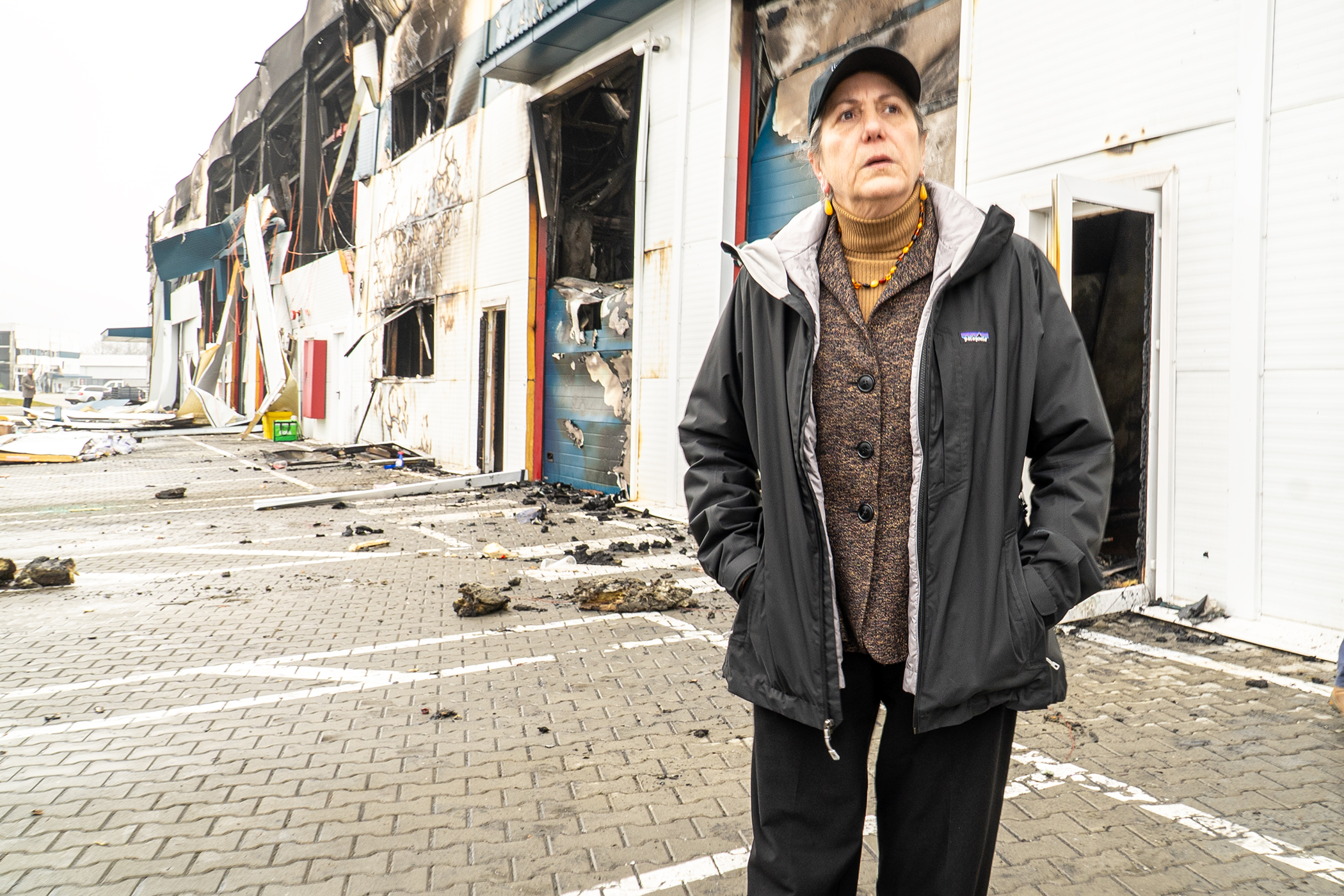
CEO Erin McKee inspects destroyed medical warehouse in Lviv on November 20, 2025

In August 2025, McKee was appointed Chief Executive Officer of Nova Ukraine, a U.S.-based nonprofit organization providing aid to Ukraine.

In November 2025, after a Russian strike destroyed one of Nova Ukraine's medical warehouses in Lviv, Nova Ukraine issued public statements about the incident and its efforts to assess losses and reroute or replace affected medical supplies; a distributed release attributed comments to McKee in her capacity as CEO.

== Major accomplishments ==
=== Assistant Administrator for Europe and Eurasia, USAID (2022–2025) ===
McKee led USAID's Bureau for Europe and Eurasia from 2022 to 2025, during Russia's full-scale invasion of Ukraine.

=== United States Ambassador to Papua New Guinea, Solomon Islands, and Vanuatu (2019–2022) ===
As Ambassador, McKee strengthened U.S. diplomatic ties and expanded the American presence in the Pacific Islands. She oversaw the construction of a new embassy compound in Papua New Guinea and the reopening of the U.S. Embassy in Honiara, Solomon Islands. During her tenure, the embassy staff doubled in size and diversity, with new agencies and resources dedicated to advancing U.S. interests and supporting democratic development in the region.

== Honors and awards ==
McKee received the President's Award for Distinguished Federal Civilian Service in recognition of her achievements within USAID. In September 2025, McKee was honored with the Lifetime Achievement Award from the Alliance for American Leadership at its launch reception in New York City.

== Personal ==
McKee is married and has a child. She speaks Russian, Spanish, and Bahasa Indonesia.

Diplomatic posts
| Preceded by Catherine Ebert-Gray | United States Ambassador to Papua New Guinea; 2019–2022 | Succeeded by Ann M. Yastishock |
| Preceded by Catherine Ebert-Gray | United States Ambassador to Vanuatu; 2020–2022 | Succeeded by Ann M. Yastishock |
| Preceded by Catherine Ebert-Gray | United States Ambassador to the Solomon Islands; 2020–2022 | Succeeded by Ann M. Yastishock |
