= Paul Fisher Gardner =

American diplomat (1930–2020)

United States Ambassador to Papua New Guinea
- In office August 7, 1984 – October 1, 1986
- President: Ronald Reagan
- Preceded by: M. Virginia Schafer
- Succeeded by: Everett E. Bierman

United States Ambassador to the Solomon Islands
- In office April 22, 1985 – October 1, 1986
- President: Ronald Reagan
- Preceded by: M. Virginia Schafer
- Succeeded by: Everett E. Bierman

Personal details
- Born: October 1, 1930 San Antonio, Texas, U.S.
- Died: August 3, 2020 (aged 89) Fairfax, Virginia, U.S.
- Spouse: Judith Bearup
- Children: Amanda Jane Gardner
- Education: University of Texas at Austin (BA, MA); University of Bordeaux

Military service
- Allegiance: United States
- Branch/service: United States Air Force; Air Force Reserve
- Years of service: 1954–1956
- Rank: First lieutenant

Paul Fisher Gardner (October 31, 1930 – August 3, 2020) was an American career diplomat who served as the U.S. ambassador to Papua New Guinea, with concurrent accreditation to the Solomon Islands. His prior postings included a directorship in the State Department and deputy chief of mission at the embassy in Jakarta.

== Early life ==
Born in San Antonio, Texas, on October 31, 1930, to Paul "Buck" Gardner and Maurine Kellogg Gardner, Gardner grew up alongside his identical twin brother, Pat, in the South Texas border town of Carrizo Springs, where he attended high school. Gardner went on to pursue higher education at the University of Texas at Austin, studying French, Russian, and German, and earned his Bachelor of Arts degree in 1952. Following his undergraduate studies, he attended the University of Bordeaux in France from 1952 to 1953 as a Fulbright Scholar, completing work for a master's thesis on French existentialism. He later received his Master of Arts degree from the University of Texas in 1956.

== Career ==
=== Early career ===
Before entering diplomacy, Gardner worked as an English teacher at Asherton High School in Asherton, Texas, from 1953 to 1954, and subsequently served as a first lieutenant in the United States Air Force in Alaska from 1954 to 1956.

=== Diplomatic career ===
Gardner began his diplomatic career in 1956 upon joining the state department, starting as an intelligence analyst. He was assigned to his first overseas post as a consular officer in Tananarive, Madagascar, serving from 1959 to 1961. From 1961 to 1963, he served as a political officer in Vientiane, Laos, amidst the raging civil war in the country. After returning to Washington to study Indonesian language at the Foreign Service Institute from 1963 to 1964, he was stationed as a political officer in Jakarta from 1964 to 1968, during which the 30 September Movement occurred.

He then returned to Washington as the Indonesian desk officer from 1968 to 1971. Gardner subsequently served as the counselor for political-military affairs in Phnom Penh, Cambodia, from 1972 to 1974, and as counselor for mutual security in Ankara, Turkey, from 1974 to 1976. He returned to Jakarta to take up office as counselor for political affairs from 1976 to 1978 and then as deputy chief of mission from 1978 to 1981, bringing his total time stationed in Jakarta across two postings to ten years. During his second round of posting in Jakarta, Gardner oversaw the gradual independence of the Indonesian-American Institute (Lembaga Indonesia Amerika, LIA), where he commented following the opening of LIA's new building in 1979 that LIA is "distancing itself from the embassy, both literally and figuratively".

Gardner's return to Washington in 1981 was marked with his appointment as director of regional affairs within the State Department's Bureau of East Asian and Pacific Affairs. On June 13, 1984, Gardner, already with the diplomatic rank of minister counsellor, was nominated as ambassador to Papua New Guinea and the Solomon Islands, with residence in Port Moresby. He was appointed on August 13, 1984 and sworn in for the ambassadorial position four days later on August 17, 1984. Gardner presented his credentials as ambassador to Papua New Guinea on September 7, 1984, and to the Solomon Islands on April 22, 1985. He departed Port Moresby on October 1, 1986, after his term ended.

After returning to Northern Virginia in 1986, Gardner authored two books titled: New Enterprise in the South Pacific, written while he was a fellow at the National Defense College, and Shared Hopes, Separate Fears, which a history of U.S.–Indonesian relations. In his retirement, he also worked as a lecturer on cruise ships traveling to Indonesia. Both books were commissioned by the United States – Indonesia Society shortly after its founding to examine bilateral relations between the two countries.

== Personal life ==
Gardner was married to Judith Bearup, whom he met on a tennis court during his military service, while Bearup was working for the Australian embassy in the U.S. The two were wed in 1956 shortly after his arrival for his first posting in Tananarive, where Bearup had acquired U.S. citizenship and Gardner the wedding permit from the State Department. The couple has a daughter.

Gardner died in Fairfax, Virginia on August 30, 2020. He was 90.
