= List of ambassadors of the United States to Papua New Guinea =

Ambassador of the United States to Papua New Guinea
- Seal of the United States Department of State

- Flag of a United States ambassador

- Incumbent; Alex M. Berenberg; Chargé d'affaires since January 17, 2026
- Nominator: The president of the United States
- Appointer: The president; with Senate advice and consent
- Inaugural holder: Mary Olmsted as Envoy Extraordinary and Minister Plenipotentiary
- Formation: September 10, 1975
- Website: U.S. Embassy - Port Moresby

Diplomatic presence of the United States of America in Papua New Guinea began on September 16, 1975 when the latter became an independent state. The United States Embassy was opened on September 10, 1975 and Mary S. Olmsted became the first U.S. Ambassador to Papua New Guinea on January 5, 1976. Since establishment of a diplomatic mission in Port Moresby, the United States ambassador to Papua New Guinea has also been accredited to Solomon Islands and Vanuatu.

The United States Embassy in Papua New Guinea is located in Port Moresby.

== Ambassadors ==
- Mary S. Olmsted – Career FSO
  - Title: Envoy Extraordinary and Minister Plenipotentiary.
  - Appointed: January 5, 1976
  - Terminated mission: Left post, July 28, 1979
- Harvey J. Feldman – Political Appointee
  - Title: Envoy Extraordinary and Minister Plenipotentiary.
  - Appointed: September 26, 1979
  - Terminated mission: Left post, May 25, 1981
- M. Virginia Schafer – Career FSO
  - Title: Envoy Extraordinary and Minister Plenipotentiary.
  - Appointed: November 3, 1981
  - Terminated mission: Left post, May 20, 1984
- Paul Fisher Gardner – Career FSO
  - Title: Envoy Extraordinary and Minister Plenipotentiary.
  - Appointed: September 7, 1984
  - Terminated mission: Left post, October 1, 1986
- Everett E. Bierman – Political Appointee
  - Title: Envoy Extraordinary and Minister Plenipotentiary.
  - Appointed: November 11, 1986
  - Terminated mission: Left post, October 30, 1989
- Robert William Farrand – Career FSO
  - Title: Envoy Extraordinary and Minister Plenipotentiary.
  - Appointed: May 1, 1990
  - Terminated mission: Left post, September 13, 1993
- Richard W. Teare – Career FSO
  - Title: Envoy Extraordinary and Minister Plenipotentiary.
  - Appointed: November 23, 1993
  - Terminated mission: Left post, July 14, 1996
- Arma Jane Karaer – Career FSO
  - Title: Envoy Extraordinary and Minister Plenipotentiary.
  - Appointed: April 15, 1997
  - Terminated mission: Left post, May 28, 2000
- Susan S. Jacobs – Career FSO
  - Title: Envoy Extraordinary and Minister Plenipotentiary.
  - Appointed: November 7, 2000
  - Terminated mission: Left post, August 1, 2003
- Robert W. Fitts – Career FSO
  - Title: Envoy Extraordinary and Minister Plenipotentiary.
  - Appointed: September 11, 2003
  - Terminated mission: Left post, September 5, 2006
- Leslie V. Rowe – Career FSO
  - Title: Envoy Extraordinary and Minister Plenipotentiary.
  - Appointed: October 15, 2006
  - Terminated mission: Left post, July 11, 2009
- Teddy B. Taylor – Career FSO
  - Title: Envoy Extraordinary and Minister Plenipotentiary.
  - Appointed: October 26, 2009
  - Terminated mission: October 6, 2012
- Walter E. North - Career FSO
  - Title: Envoy Extraordinary and Minister Plenipotentiary.
  - Appointed: January 31, 2013
  - Terminated mission: January 22, 2016
- Catherine Ebert-Gray - Career FSO
  - Title: Envoy Extraordinary and Minister Plenipotentiary.
  - Appointed: February 23, 2016
  - Terminated mission: November 17, 2019
- Erin Elizabeth McKee - Career FSO
  - Title: Envoy Extraordinary and Minister Plenipotentiary.
  - Appointed: November 27, 2019
  - Terminated mission: April 14, 2022
- Ann M. Yastishock - Career FSO
  - Appointed: February 21, 2024
  - Terminated mission: January 16, 2026

== See also ==
- Papua New Guinea – United States relations
- Foreign relations of Papua New Guinea
- Ambassadors of the United States
