= Susan S. Jacobs =

American diplomat

Susan Jacobs
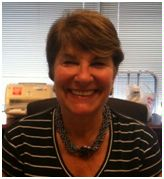

Special Advisor for Children's Issues
- In office September 30, 2011 – 2017
- President: Barack Obama
- Preceded by: Position established

United States Ambassador to the Solomon Islands
- In office December 4, 2000 – August 1, 2003
- President: George W. Bush
- Preceded by: Arma Karaer
- Succeeded by: Robert Fitts

United States Ambassador to Vanuatu
- In office November 29, 2000 – August 1, 2003
- President: George W. Bush
- Preceded by: Arma Karaer
- Succeeded by: Robert Fitts

United States Ambassador to Papua New Guinea
- In office November 7, 2000 – August 1, 2003
- President: George W. Bush
- Preceded by: Arma Karaer
- Succeeded by: Robert Fitts

Personal details
- Born: 1945 (age 80–81)
- Education: University of Michigan, Ann Arbor; Georgetown University; George Washington University

Susan S. Jacobs was the first person to fill the newly created role of Special Advisor for International Children's Issues. This new foreign policy position and assignment for Jacobs was created by Secretary of State Hillary Clinton and announced on July 1, 2010.

Jacobs has previously served as a Senior Policy Advisor in the Department of State's Bureau of Consular Affairs. A former U.S. Ambassador to Papua New Guinea, the Solomon Islands and Vanuatu, she also served as Deputy Assistant Secretary for Global Issues in the Bureau of Legislative Affairs. Her Foreign Service career also included tours in Caracas, Tel Aviv, New Delhi, Bucharest, and San Salvador. Jacobs retired from the Foreign Service in 2017.

Jacobs graduated from the University of Michigan and later studied at Georgetown University Law School and the George Washington University. She has received the Department of State's Superior and Meritorious Honor Awards, and the U.S. Embassy New Delhi's Community Achievement Award.

== See also ==
- International child abduction in the United States
- Office of Children's Issues

Diplomatic posts
Preceded by Arma Karaer	United States Ambassador to Papua New Guinea; 2000–2003	Succeeded by Robert Fitts
Preceded by Arma Karaer	United States Ambassador to Vanuatu; 2000–2003	Succeeded by Robert Fitts
Preceded by Arma Karaer	United States Ambassador to the Solomon Islands; 2000–2003	Succeeded by Robert Fitts
New office	Special Advisor for Children's Issues; 2011–2017	Incumbent
