= Teddy B. Taylor =

American diplomat

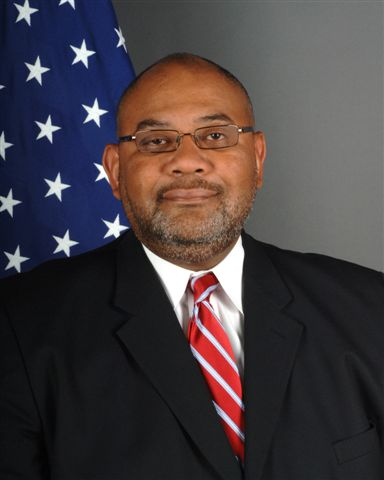

United States Ambassador to Papua New Guinea, accredited to Solomon Islands, Vanuatu
- In office October 26, 2009 – October 6, 2012
- President: Barack Obama
- Preceded by: Leslie V. Rowe
- Succeeded by: Walter E. North

Personal details
- Born: 1953 (age 72–73) Washington, D.C.
- Spouse: Antoinette Corbin-Taylor
- Education: Florida A&M University (B.A.)

Teddy Bernard Taylor (born 1953) is a United States diplomat. A member of the Senior Foreign Service, Taylor served as the United States Ambassador to Papua New Guinea, Solomon Islands and Vanuatu. He was succeeded by Walter E. North on November 7, 2012.

== Early life ==
Taylor was born in 1953 in Washington, D.C. He graduated from Florida A&M University in 1975. While enrolled at FAMU he became initiated as a brother of Omega Psi Phi fraternity.

== Political career ==
Taylor started his diplomatic career in 1978 working as a Consular/Economic Officer at the U.S. Embassy in Guatemala through 1980. From 1981 to 1983, he worked at the U.S. Embassy in Panama and from 1983 to 1985, at the embassy in Honduras. In 1985, upon his return to the states, he was appointed Deputy Director of Press and Public Affairs in the Bureau of Western Hemisphere Affairs remaining on the post until 1987 when he took up the role of Deputy Policy Officer for Latin America at the United States Information Agency. From 1988 through 1991, he served as Deputy Director for East Asian and Pacific Assignments at the Bureau of Human Resources; from 1991 to 1992, he was the Deputy Examiner in the Board of Foreign Service Examiners in the same Bureau and from 1992 through 1993, he served as the Special Assistant in the Visa Services Office in the Bureau of Consular Affairs.

In 1995, he was assigned to the U.S. Embassy in Budapest, Hungary, where he worked as the Consular Affairs Officer until 1999. In 2001, Taylor was appointed Director of the Orientation Division of Foreign Service Institute. He was the first African-American to hold this post. Shortly thereafter, he served as the Consul General at U.S. Interests Section in Havana, Cuba. In 2001-2003, he was Deputy Assistant Secretary of State and Director of the Office of Employee Relations in the Bureau of Human Resources. On September 21, 2009 he was sworn in as the United States Ambassador to Papua New Guinea, also accredited to US embassies in the Solomon Islands and Vanuatu.

== Personal life ==
Being a member of Omega Psi Phi, he was active in extracurricular activities in some places of assignment. In Panama, he coached a teenager basketball team in Panama Canal Zone; in Hungary, he was the Chairperson of the Cub and Boy Scout parent organization and merit badge instructor and Chairman of the Eagle Scout Board of Review committee. He was married to Foreign Service Officer Antoinette Corbin-Taylor (deceased). The couple has two children. Taylor is fluent in Spanish, Turkish and Hungarian.

Diplomatic posts
Preceded by Leslie V. Rowe	United States Ambassador to Vanuatu; 2009–2012	Succeeded by Walter E. North
Preceded by Leslie V. Rowe	United States Ambassador to Papua New Guinea; 2009–2012	Succeeded by Walter E. North
Preceded by Leslie V. Rowe	United States Ambassador to the Solomon Islands; 2009–2012	Succeeded by Walter E. North
