= Ann M. Yastishock =

American diplomat

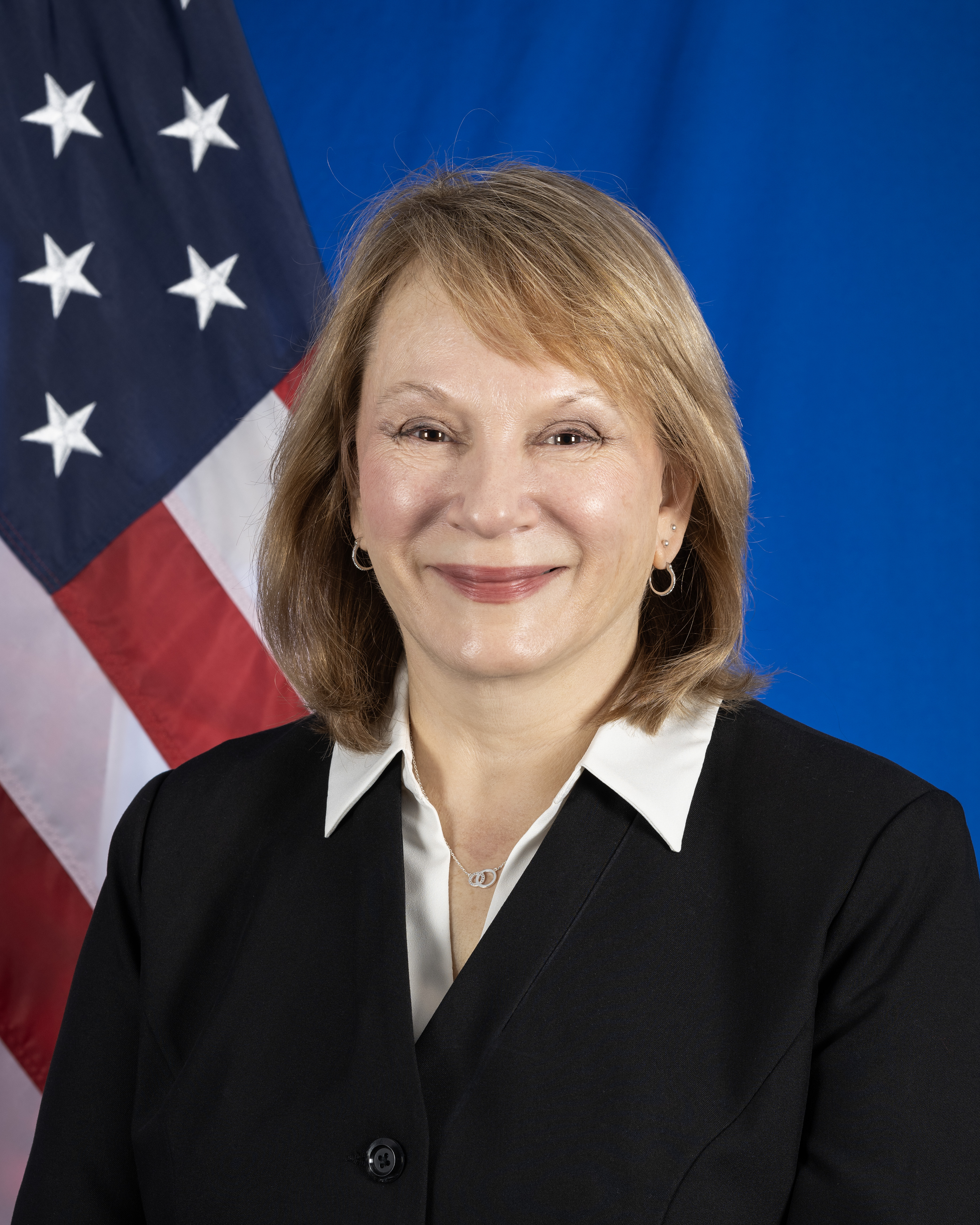

United States Ambassador to Papua New Guinea
- In office February 21, 2024 – January 16, 2026
- President: Joe Biden; Donald Trump
- Preceded by: Erin Elizabeth McKee

United States Ambassador to the Solomon Islands
- In office March 14, 2024 – January 16, 2026
- President: Joe Biden; Donald Trump
- Preceded by: Erin Elizabeth McKee

United States Ambassador to Vanuatu
- In office April 16, 2024 – January 16, 2026
- President: Joe Biden; Donald Trump
- Preceded by: Erin Elizabeth McKee

Personal details
- Born: April 20 Harrisburg, Pennsylvania
- Education: Pennsylvania State University (BS); Widener University Commonwealth Law School (JD)
- Occupation: Diplomat, ambassador

Ann Marie Yastishock (born April 20) is an American diplomat who had served as the United States ambassador to Papua New Guinea, along with the Solomon Islands and Vanuatu.

== Early life and education ==
Yastishock was born on April 20 in Harrisburg, Pennsylvania to Theodore Yastishock (1919–1965) and Mary Ann Gogar (1919–2001). She had five siblings: Mary, Julia, Elizabeth, Daniel and Charles. In addition, she had an older brother named Theodore, who died in 1952 as a toddler.

Yastishock earned her Bachelor of Science (BA) in economics from Pennsylvania State University and a Juris Doctor (JD) from the Widener University Commonwealth Law School.

== Career ==
Yastishock is a career member of the Senior Foreign Service, with the rank of Minister-Counselor. She formerly served as Senior Deputy Assistant Administrator in Bureau for Asia, within the United States Agency for International Development (USAID). She previously was the USAID Mission Director in Hanoi, Vietnam. She has also served as the Chief Advisor to the Acting Administrator and Chief Operating Officer for USAID. Before that, she was the Acting Senior Deputy Assistant Administrator of the Bureau for Asia, responsible for USAID missions and programs in East Asia and the Pacific. She oversaw USAID activities in South and Central Asia as the Deputy Assistant Administrator in the Bureau for Asia. One of her assignments was as a government lawyer in Afghanistan. Prior assignments in USAID include serving as the Deputy Mission Director for the regional office of USAID covering Ukraine, Moldova, Belarus, and Cyprus; Interim Deputy Mission Director for USAID Burma; deputy director of the USAID Center of Excellence on Democracy, Human Rights and Governance; Senior Legal Advisor to USAID/Afghanistan; and Resident Legal Advisor to Georgia, Armenia, and Azerbaijan. Before her tenure at USAID, Yastishock worked as a Rule of Law Liaison for the American Bar Association/Central and East European Law Initiative with the parliaments of Kazakhstan and Tajikistan.

In February 2023, a government watchdog reported that several government officials, including Yastishock, were improperly serving in their roles.

=== U.S. ambassadorship nomination ===
On July 11, 2022, President Joe Biden nominated Yastishock to be the next ambassador to Papua New Guinea, serving concurrently as the ambassador to the Solomon Islands and Vanuatu. Her nomination was not acted upon for the rest of the year and was subsequently returned to Biden on January 3, 2023.

President Biden renominated her the next day. Hearings on her nomination were held before the Senate Foreign Relations Committee on March 30, 2023. The committee favorably reported the nomination on April 27, 2023. On November 29, 2023, her nomination was confirmed by United States Senate by voice vote. Ann Marie Yastishock presented credentials to the Acting Governor General of Papua New Guinea Job Pomat on February 21, 2024. She presented credentials to the Acting Governor-General of Solomon Islands Patteson Oti on March 14, 2024. She presented credentials to President of Vanuatu Nikenike Vurobaravu on April 16, 2024.

== Awards and recognitions ==
Yastishock is the recipient of numerous USAID performance awards.

== Personal life ==
Yastishock is a native of Pennsylvania and speaks Russian. As of 2025, she lives in Washington D.C.

Diplomatic posts
Preceded by Erin Elizabeth McKee	United States Ambassador to Vanuatu; 2024–present	Incumbent
Preceded by Erin Elizabeth McKee	United States Ambassador to Papua New Guinea; 2024–present	Incumbent
Preceded by Erin Elizabeth McKee	United States Ambassador to the Solomon Islands; 2024–present	Incumbent
