= Susan Rice =

American politician and diplomat (born 1964)

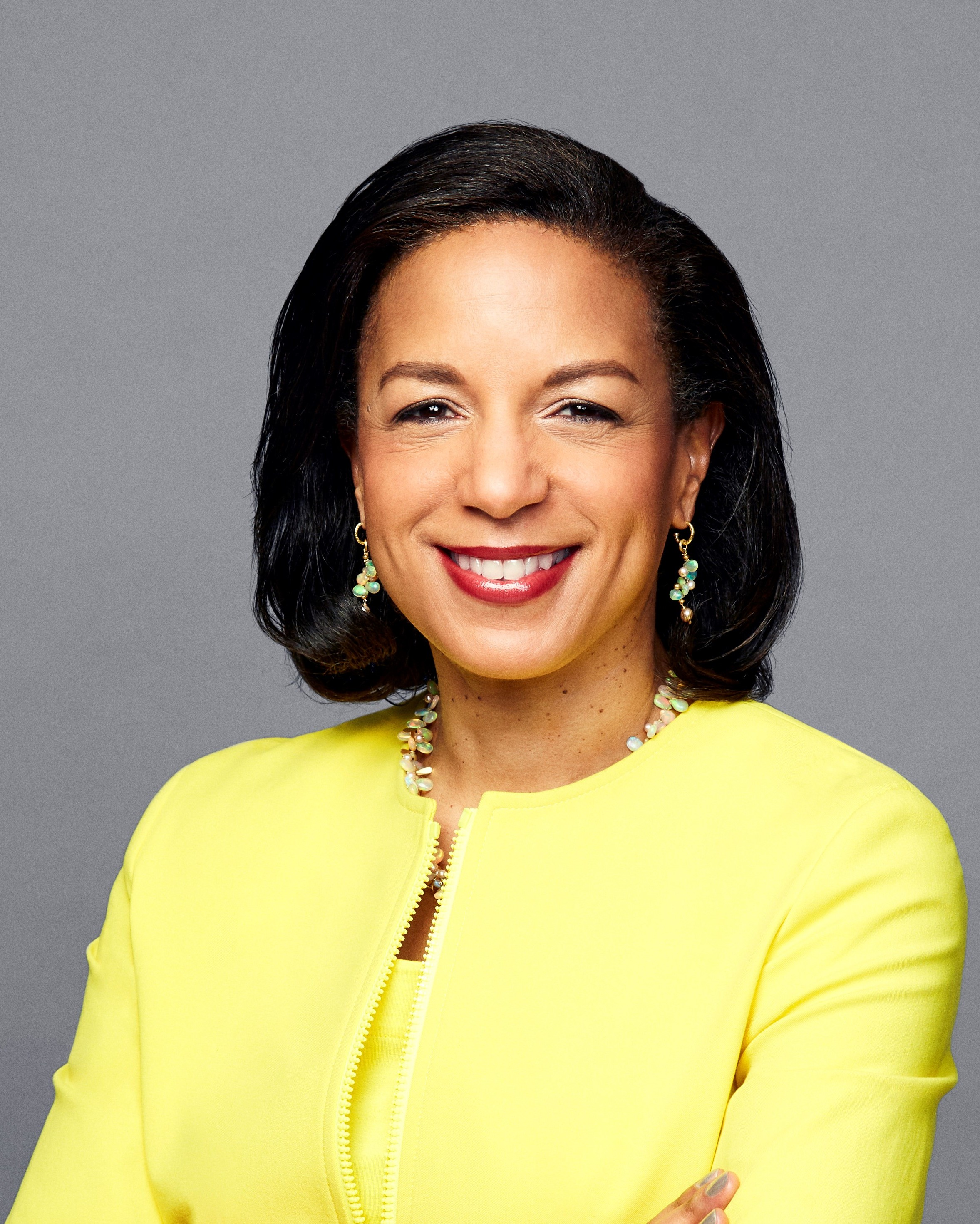
- Official portrait, 2021

22nd Director of the Domestic Policy Council
- In office January 20, 2021 – May 26, 2023
- President: Joe Biden
- Preceded by: Brooke Rollins (acting)
- Succeeded by: Neera Tanden

23rd United States National Security Advisor
- In office July 1, 2013 – January 20, 2017
- President: Barack Obama
- Deputy: Antony Blinken; Avril Haines
- Preceded by: Thomas E. Donilon
- Succeeded by: Michael Flynn

27th United States Ambassador to the United Nations
- In office January 26, 2009 – June 30, 2013
- President: Barack Obama
- Deputy: Brooke Anderson; Rosemary DiCarlo
- Preceded by: Zalmay Khalilzad
- Succeeded by: Samantha Power

12th Assistant Secretary of State for African Affairs
- In office October 14, 1997 – January 20, 2001
- President: Bill Clinton
- Preceded by: George Moose
- Succeeded by: Walter H. Kansteiner III

Personal details
- Born: Susan Elizabeth Rice; November 17, 1964 (age 61) Washington, D.C., U.S.
- Party: Democratic
- Spouse: Ian Cameron (m. 1992)
- Children: 2
- Parent(s): Emmett J. Rice (father); Lois Dickson Rice (mother)
- Education: Stanford University (BA); New College, Oxford (MPhil, DPhil)

Susan Elizabeth Rice (born November 17, 1964) is an American former diplomat, policy advisor, and public official. As a member of the Democratic Party, Rice served as the 22nd director of the United States Domestic Policy Council from 2021 to 2023, as the 27th U.S. ambassador to the United Nations from 2009 to 2013, and as the 23rd U.S. national security advisor from 2013 to 2017.

Rice was born in Washington, D.C., and attended Stanford University and New College, Oxford, where she was a Rhodes Scholar and received a D.Phil. She served on President Bill Clinton's National Security Council staff from 1993 to 1997 and was the assistant secretary of state for African affairs at the State Department from 1997 to 2001. Appointed at age 32, Rice was then the youngest person to have served as a regional assistant secretary of state. Rice's tenure saw significant changes in U.S.–Africa policy, including the passage of the African Growth and Opportunity Act, support for democratic transitions in South Africa and Nigeria, and an increased U.S. focus on fighting HIV/AIDS.

A former Brookings Institution fellow, Rice served as a foreign policy advisor to Democratic presidential nominees Michael Dukakis, John Kerry, and Barack Obama. After Obama won the 2008 presidential election, Rice was nominated as ambassador to the United Nations. The Senate confirmed her by unanimous consent on January 22, 2009. During her tenure at the United Nations, Rice championed a human rights and anti-poverty agenda, elevated climate change and LGBT and women's rights as global priorities, and committed the U.S. to agreements such as the Nuclear Non-Proliferation Treaty, Convention on the Rights of Persons with Disabilities, and the U.N. Millennium Development Goals. She also defended Israel at the Security Council, pushed for tough sanctions against Iran and North Korea, and advocated for U.S. and NATO intervention in Libya in 2011.

Mentioned as a possible replacement for retiring United States secretary of state Hillary Clinton in 2012, Rice withdrew from consideration following controversy related to the 2012 attack on a U.S. diplomatic facility in Benghazi. President Barack Obama instead named her national security advisor in 2013, where she supported U.S. efforts on the Iran nuclear deal of 2015, the Ebola epidemic, the reopening to Cuba, and the Paris Agreement on climate change. From 2021 to 2023, Rice was the director of the Domestic Policy Council in the Biden administration.

== Early life and education ==
Rice was born in Washington D.C., to education policy scholar Lois Rice (née Dickson) (1933–2017), who helped design the federal Pell Grant subsidy system and who joined the Brookings Institution in 1992; and Emmett J. Rice (1919–2011), a Cornell University economics professor and the second black governor of the Federal Reserve System. Her maternal grandparents were Jamaican immigrants to Portland, Maine; her paternal grandparents were from South Carolina. Her parents divorced when Rice was ten years of age. In 1978, her mother married Alfred Bradley Fitt, an attorney, who at the time was general counsel of the U. S. Congressional Budget Office.

Rice said that her parents taught her to "never use race as an excuse or advantage," and as a young girl she "dreamed of becoming the first U.S. senator from the District of Columbia".

Rice was a three-letter varsity athlete, student government president, and valedictorian at National Cathedral School in Washington, D.C., a private girls' day school. She attended Stanford University, where she won a Truman Scholarship and graduated with a Bachelor of Arts (BA) with honors in history in 1986. She was also awarded a National Merit Scholarship and elected Phi Beta Kappa her junior year.

Rice attended New College, Oxford on a Rhodes Scholarship, where she earned a Master of Philosophy (MPhil) in 1988 and a Doctor of Philosophy (DPhil) degree in 1990, both in International Relations. Her doctoral dissertation was entitled Commonwealth Initiative in Zimbabwe, 1979–1980: Implications for International Peacekeeping. Chatham House, the Royal Institute of International Affairs, honored her dissertation as the UK's most distinguished in international relations. During her time at Oxford, Rice was a member of the Oxford University Women's Basketball Team.

On 15 May 2026, Rice received an honorary Doctorate of Humane Letters from American University of Rome at the university’s 2026 Commencement Ceremony at Villa Miani in Rome.

== Early career ==
Rice served as a foreign policy aide to Michael Dukakis during his campaign in the 1988 presidential election. She was a management consultant at McKinsey & Company, a global management consulting firm, from 1990 to early 1992. Rice worked in McKinsey's Toronto office.

== Clinton administration (1993–2001) ==
Rice served in the Clinton administration in various capacities: at the National Security Council (NSC) from 1993 to 1997 (as director for international organizations and peacekeeping from 1993 to 1995, and as special assistant to the president and senior director for African affairs from 1995 to 1997); and as Assistant Secretary of State for African Affairs from 1997 to 2001. Rice's tenure saw significant changes in U.S.-Africa policy, including the passage of the African Growth and Opportunity Act, support for democratic transitions in South Africa and Nigeria, and an increased U.S. focus on fighting the HIV/AIDS pandemic.

=== National Security Council ===
At the time of the 1994 Rwandan genocide, Rice reportedly said, "If we use the word 'genocide' and are seen as doing nothing, what will be the effect on the November election?" She denied the quote but acknowledged the mistakes made at the time and felt that a debt needed repaying. The inability or failure of the Clinton administration to do anything about the genocide would form her later views on possible military interventions. She said of the experience: "I swore to myself that if I ever faced such a crisis again, I would come down on the side of dramatic action, going down in flames if that was required." Later in 2012, during an interview with The New Republic, Rice stated "To suggest that I'm repenting for [Rwanda] or that I'm haunted by that or that I don't sleep at night because of that or that every policy I've implemented subsequently is driven by that is garbage."

Timothy M. Carney, former U.S. ambassador to Sudan, co-authored an op-ed in 2002 claiming that in 1997 Sudan offered to turn over its intelligence on Osama bin Laden but that Rice, together with then NSC terrorism specialist Richard A. Clarke, successfully lobbied for continuing to bar U.S. officials from engaging with the Khartoum government. Similar allegations were made by Vanity Fair contributing editor David Rose and Richard Miniter, author of Losing Bin Laden. The allegations against Rice were determined to be unfounded by the Joint Congressional Inquiry into 9/11 and the 9/11 Commission, which found no evidence that Sudan ever made an offer to share intelligence on bin Laden.

=== Assistant Secretary of State for African Affairs ===
Secretary of State Madeleine Albright, a longtime mentor and family friend to Rice, urged Clinton to appoint Rice as Assistant Secretary of State for African Affairs in 1997. At a confirmation hearing chaired by Senator John Ashcroft, Rice, who attended the hearing along with her infant son whom she was then nursing, made a great impression on senators from both parties and "sailed through the confirmation process."

In the context of the Rwandan, Ugandan, AFDL and Angolan invasion of Zaire (later known as the Democratic Republic of the Congo) in 1996 and overthrow of dictator Mobutu Sese Seko, Rice is alleged to have said that "Anything's better than Mobutu." According to Gérard Prunier, a staffer to the Assistant Secretary said that "the only thing we have to do is look the other way," with respect to regional intervention in the conflict. New York Times correspondent Howard W. French said that according to his sources, Rice herself made the remark.

On July 7, 1998, Rice was a member of an American delegation to visit detained Nigerian president-elect Basorun Moshood Kashimawo Olawale Abiola. During this meeting, Abiola had a fatal heart attack.

Rice supported U.S. efforts to reach both the Lusaka Ceasefire Agreement in the Congo and the Lomé Peace Accord in Sierra Leone. Some observers criticized the Sierra Leone agreement as too indulgent of the Revolutionary United Front (RUF) and for bringing the war criminal Foday Sankoh into government, leading to the adoption of United Nations Security Council Resolution 1313, which blamed the RUF for the continuing conflict in the west African country. Rice played a major role in peace negotiations between Ethiopia and Eritrea during the Eritrean–Ethiopian War, leading to the Algiers Agreement in 2000 ending the conflict. For her efforts she was named a co-recipient of the White House's Samuel Nelson Drew Memorial Award for "distinguished contributions to the formation of peaceful, cooperative relationships between nations," alongside Gayle Smith and Anthony Lake.

Rice had a contentious relationship with State Department veteran Richard Holbrooke, whom she considered to be meddling on her turf and who in return felt she was rising too quickly in U.S. diplomatic ranks.

== Business and think tank activities (2001–2008) ==
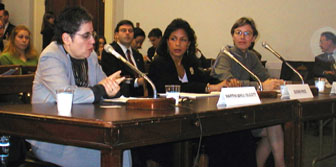
Susan E. Rice (middle) at the USCIRF hearings (November 27, 2001)

Rice was managing director and principal at Intellibridge from 2001 to 2002. From 2002 to 2009, she was a senior fellow at the Brookings Institution, where "she focused on U.S. foreign policy, weak and failing states, the implications of global poverty, and transnational threats to security."

Michael E. O'Hanlon and Ivo Daalder, two Brookings colleagues of Rice at the time, said that Rice consistently opposed the 2003 invasion of Iraq in the run-up to the war. In 2012, columnist Peter Beinart reviewed a series of NPR interviews with Rice in late 2002 and early 2003 and concluded that Rice's position on war was equivocal. For example, in a December 2002 NPR interview, Rice said, "It's clear that Iraq poses a major threat. It's clear that its weapons of mass destruction need to be dealt with forcefully, and that's the path we're on. I think the question becomes whether we can keep the diplomatic balls in the air and not drop any, even as we move forward, as we must, on the military side.... The George W. Bush administration frankly owes the American public a much fuller and more honest assessment of what the costs will be of the actual conflict, as well as the aftermath, the post-conflict reconstruction. And the costs are going to be huge." In her memoir, Rice wrote, "Long experienced with the menace of Al Qaeda, I was one of the very few scholars at Brookings to openly oppose the Iraq War. From the start, I viewed that war of choice as a dangerous diversion from the main objective of defeating Al Qaeda globally and in Afghanistan." Shortly after the war began, Rice warned that the U.S. commitment to rebuilding Iraq would likely last for many years.

Rice served as a foreign policy adviser to John Kerry during Kerry's 2004 presidential campaign.

Rice went on leave from the Brookings Institution to serve as a senior foreign policy adviser to Barack Obama in his 2008 presidential campaign. She was one of the first high-profile foreign policy staffers to sign onto Obama's campaign, as most of her peers had supported Hillary Clinton during the presidential primaries. Rice criticized Obama's Republican opponent in the campaign, John McCain, calling his policies "reckless" and dismissing the Arizona senator's trip to Iraq as "strolling around the market in a flak jacket."

On November 5, 2008, Rice was named to the advisory board of the Obama–Biden transition.

== United States ambassador to the United Nations (2009–2013) ==
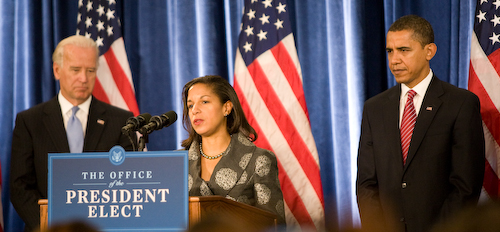
Rice with Barack Obama and Joe Biden, December 2008

On December 1, 2008, President-elect Obama announced that he would nominate Rice to be the United States ambassador to the United Nations, a position which he restored to cabinet level. Reportedly, Rice had wanted the post of national security advisor, which instead went to retired United States Marine Corps general James L. Jones.

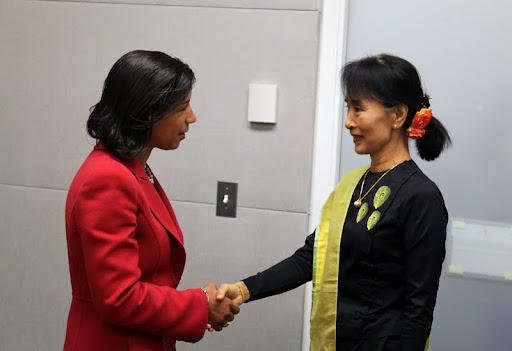
Rice meets with Myanmar's opposition leader Aung San Suu Kyi, September 2012.

At her confirmation hearing, Rice was introduced by Senator Susan Collins who said "I can think of ... no better messenger than Dr. Susan Rice. I am honored to present her to this distinguished committee, and I enthusiastically endorse her nomination." Rice was confirmed by the Senate by voice vote on January 22, 2009. Rice became the second-youngest person and the first black woman to represent the U.S. at the UN.

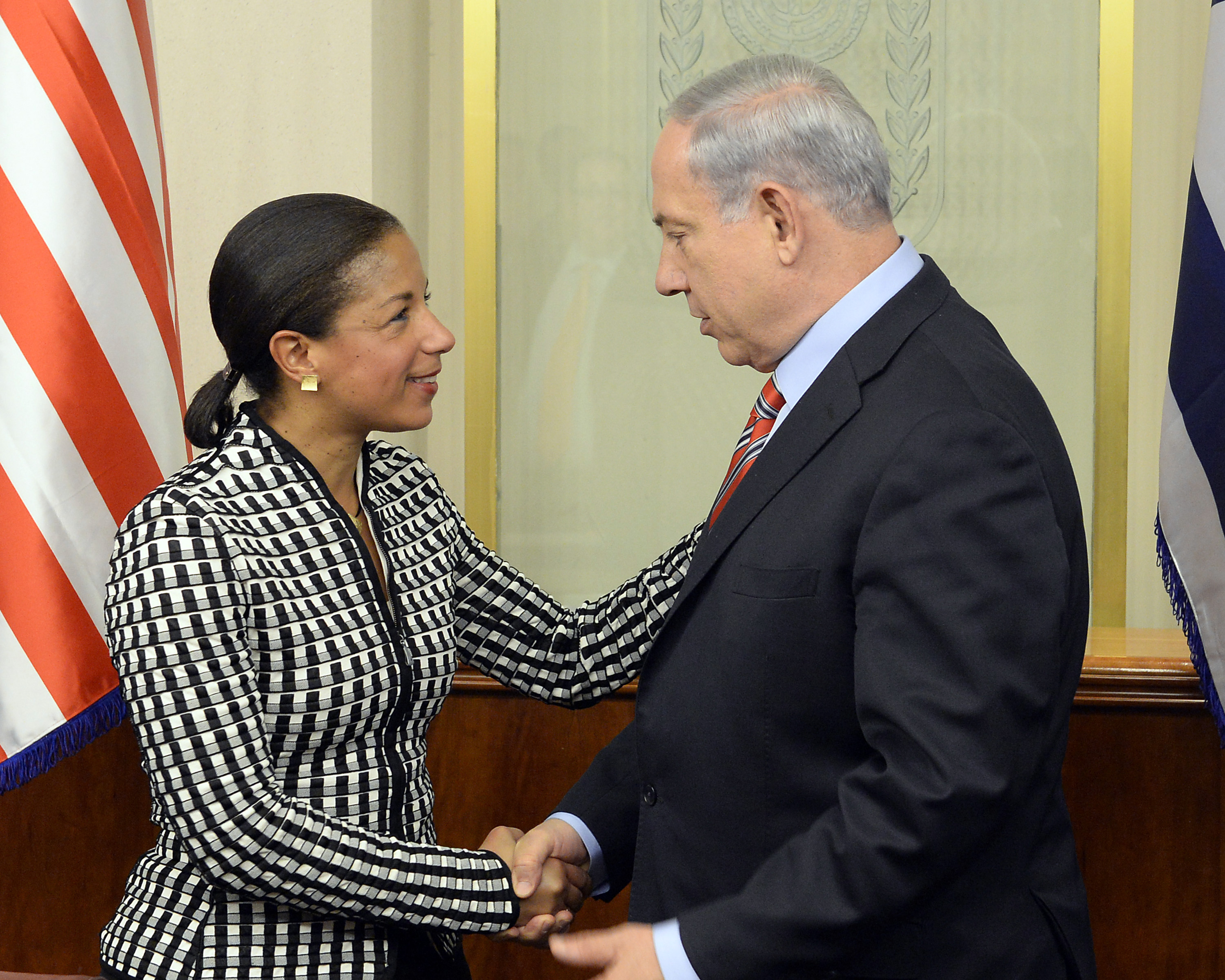
Rice meets with Israeli prime minister Benjamin Netanyahu, May 2014.

During her tenure at the United Nations, Rice championed a human rights and anti-poverty agenda, elevated climate change and women's rights as global priorities, and committed the U.S. to agreements such as the Nuclear Non-Proliferation Treaty, Convention on the Rights of Persons with Disabilities, and the U.N. Millennium Development Goals. Rice led the fight to advance LGBT rights at the U.N. Human Rights Council and was recognized for her staunch defense of Israel at the Security Council. Rice won praise for leading the Security Council to impose the toughest sanctions to date on Iran and North Korea over their nuclear programs, and for reaffirming U.S. commitment to the UN and multilateralism.

Three Security Council diplomats took issue with Rice's negotiating style, calling it "rude" and overly blunt, while others attributed those criticisms to sexism. According to David Rothkopf of Foreign Policy, Rice could be challenging to work with due to her "toughness"—in the mold of James Baker or Henry Kissinger—but had the asset of a close relationship with the U.S. president and proved to be an effective policymaker. Some human rights activists took issue with Rice and U.S. foreign policy generally in 2012 for working against UN statements that criticized Rwanda for supporting a rebel group in Congo known for committing atrocities.

=== Libyan Civil War ===
As the 2011 Libyan Civil War progressed, the United States and its allies offered a choice for Colonel Muammar Gaddafi and his aides: step down from power or face an international response. Rice offered some of the toughest rhetoric toward Gaddafi, criticizing his denials of atrocities against his own citizens as "frankly, delusional." In a closed-door Security Council meeting in April 2011, Rice reportedly stated that Gaddafi loyalists engaged in atrocities, including terrorizing the population with sexual violence, and that Gaddafi's troops has been issued Viagra. Investigations by Amnesty International, Human Rights Watch and Doctors Without Borders contradicted Rice and stated they did not find first-hand evidence that mass rapes had occurred as Rice had claimed. Together with National Security Council figure Samantha Power, who already supported the U.S.-led military intervention in Libya, and Secretary of State Hillary Clinton, who came to support it, the three overcame internal opposition from Defense Secretary Robert Gates, security adviser Thomas E. Donilon, and counterterrorism adviser John Brennan, to have the administration advance a UN proposal to impose a no-fly zone over Libya and authorize other military actions as necessary.

On March 17, 2011, the UK, France and Lebanon joined the U.S. to vote for United Nations Security Council Resolution 1973 while Brazil, Germany, and India joined permanent Security Council members China and Russia in abstaining. Rice and Clinton played major roles in gaining approval for the resolution. Rice said, "we are interested in a broad range of actions that will effectively protect civilians and increase the pressure on the Gaddafi regime to halt the killing and to allow the Libyan people to express themselves in their aspirations for the future freely and peacefully."

=== Syrian Civil War ===
In January 2012, after the Russian and Chinese veto of a Security Council resolution calling on Syrian president Bashar al-Assad to step down, Rice strongly condemned both countries, saying, "They put a stake in the heart of efforts to resolve this conflict peacefully," and adding that "we the United States are standing with the people of Syria. Russia and China are obviously with Assad." In her words, "the United States is disgusted that a couple of members of this Council continue to prevent us from fulfilling our sole purpose."

=== 2012 Benghazi attack ===
On September 11, 2012, a U.S. diplomatic facility and CIA annex in Benghazi, Libya, was attacked, resulting in the deaths of the United States ambassador to Libya J. Christopher Stevens, U.S. Foreign Service information management officer Sean Smith, and two former Navy SEALS, Glen Doherty and Tyrone S. Woods. On September 16, Rice appeared on five major interview shows to discuss the attacks. Prior to her appearance, Rice was provided with "talking points" from a CIA memo.

Each of the 11 drafts of CIA talking points maintained that the attack was "spontaneously inspired" by a violent protest at the American embassy in Cairo, Egypt, hours earlier, which had been triggered by the release of an anti-Muslim video. Protestors breached and entered the embassy compound. During the hours before the Benghazi attack, Egyptian satellite television networks popular in Benghazi had been covering the outrage over the video.

Since Rice's five television appearances, there have been persistent accusations that she had intentionally misled the public. However, none of the ten Benghazi investigations conducted by Congress—six by Republican-controlled House committees—determined she had. The Republican-controlled House Intelligence Committee's two-year investigation found that CIA analysts had erred and that there was no conclusive evidence showing that Rice or any other government official acted in bad faith or intentionally misled the American people.

A group of 97 House Republicans sent a letter to Obama on November 19 to say Rice's statements were "misleading" and that she should accordingly not be considered a candidate to succeed Hillary Clinton in 2013 as secretary of state. Some Republican senators, who would have had a vote on whether to confirm Rice, also voiced objections and said their meetings with Rice at the end of November 2012 did not ease their concerns. On December 13, 2012, in a letter to Obama, Rice asked him to remove her name from consideration for secretary of state.

== United States national security advisor (2013–2017) ==
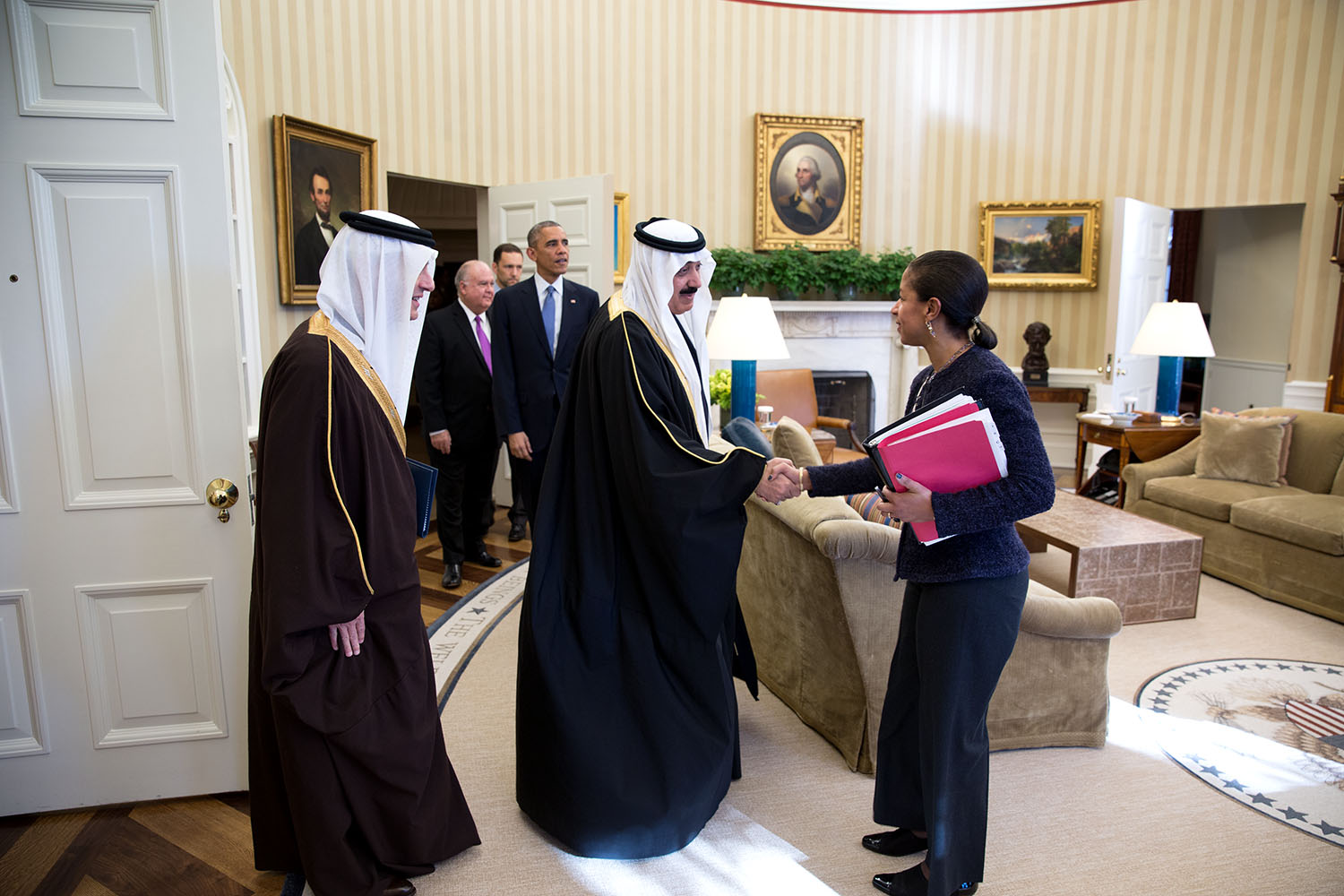
Rice and President Barack Obama meet with Saudi Arabia's minister of the national guard, Prince Mutaib bin Abdullah, November 19, 2014.

Rice was picked to succeed Tom Donilon as national security advisor following Donilon's resignation on June 5, 2013. The position of national security advisor does not require Senate approval. Rice was sworn in on July 1, 2013. During her tenure, she supported major U.S. efforts on the Iran nuclear deal of 2015, Ebola epidemic, reopening to Cuba, fight against the Islamic State, and Paris Agreement on climate change.

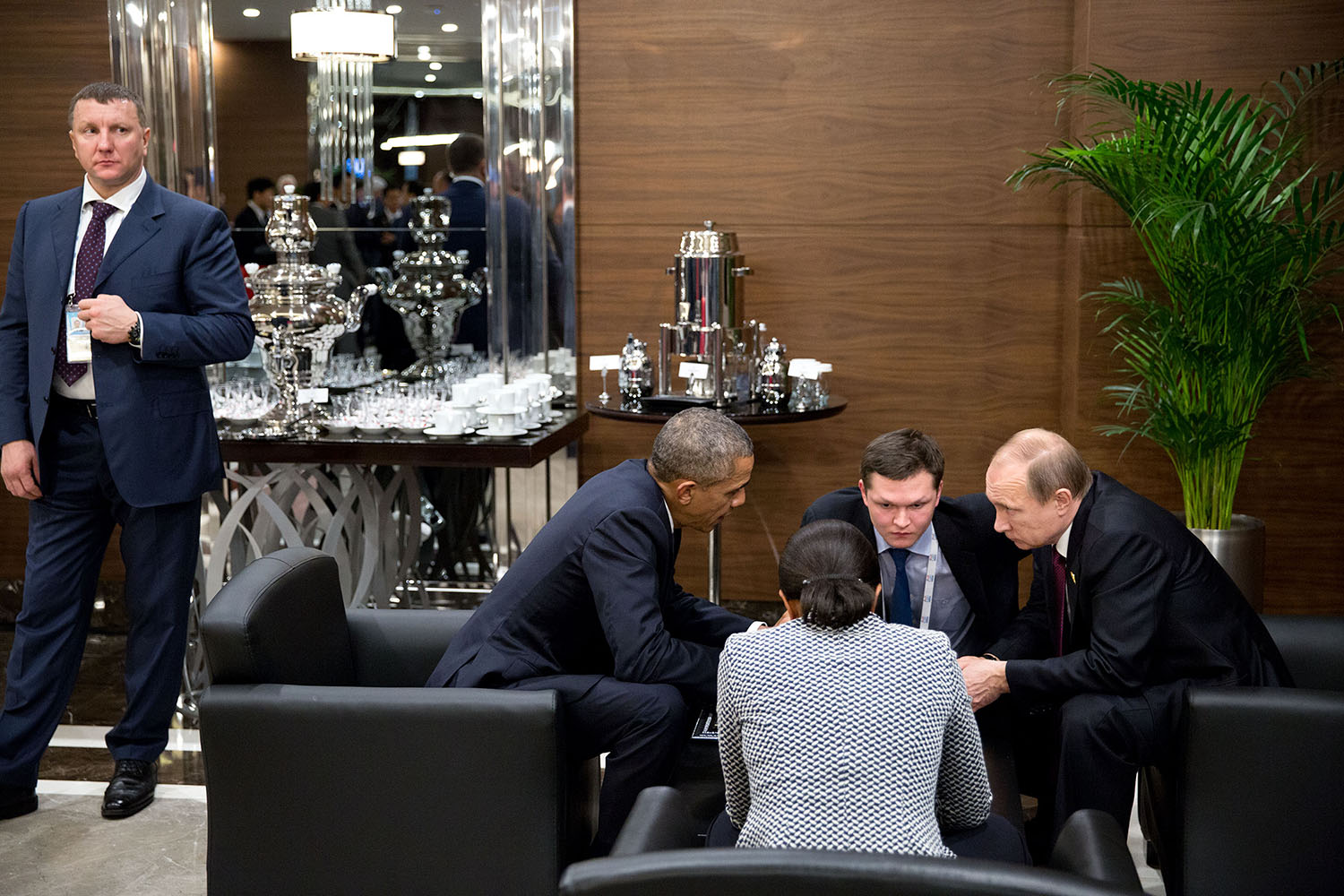
President Obama and Rice speaking with Russian president Vladimir Putin and Putin's interpreter while attending the G20 Summit in Antalya, Turkey (the photo was not taken during an official meeting) November 15, 2015

In releasing the 2015 National Security Strategy, Rice said that the United States was pursuing an "ambitious yet achievable agenda" overseas. She argued that U.S. leadership had been essential for success on issues including Ebola, Iran's nuclear program, and sanctioning Russia over Ukraine. The document formed a blueprint for foreign policy, defense, and national security for the last two years of Obama's second term. It had previously been updated in 2010. In a letter outlining the strategy, Obama said that the U.S. would "always defend our interests and uphold our commitments to allies and partners," adding, "But we have to make hard choices among many competing priorities and we must always resist the overreach that comes when we make decisions based upon fear."

=== Middle East ===
Rice criticized human rights violations in U.S.-aligned Egypt and condemned the August 2013 Rabaa massacre, in which Egyptian security forces killed over 1,000 people during mass anti-government protests. Her position at times contradicted that of Secretary of State John Kerry. In response, Rice led a review of U.S. assistance to Egypt, which resulted in the cancellation of planned joint military exercises and suspension of arms shipments.

Rice was the lone dissenter in Obama's national security team on his decision to seek congressional authorization for military strikes against Syria's chemical weapons facilities, following the Assad regime's use of sarin gas against civilians in August 2013. She argued that the administration should move forward with strikes to punish Assad, correctly predicting Congress would not grant authorization. Rice and Kerry later worked to pursue a diplomatic solution with Russia instead. This effort led to United Nations Security Council Resolution 2118, which compelled Syria to destroy its declared chemical weapons stockpile and join the Chemical Weapons Convention. Under the agreement, 1,300 metric tons of chemical weapons were removed from Syria under international observation. Nevertheless, the Assad regime either obtained or produced additional sarin gas for renewed chemical attacks in 2017.

In May 2014, Rice traveled to Israel for meetings with Israeli officials in which nuclear talks with Iran were discussed. Rice's visit, her first as national security advisor, came after peace talks between Israel and the Palestinians collapsed. The Obama administration made clear that Rice's trip was part of regularly scheduled talks and that the stalled Middle East peace discussions were not on the agenda. Rice was criticized by some for intensifying the Obama administration's conflicts with Israel during her time as national security advisor. Dennis Ross, one of Obama's Middle East advisors, criticized Rice's "combative mind-set" as opposed to her predecessor, Tom Donilon, who played a more conciliatory role. Ross wrote that after Israeli prime minister Benjamin Netanyahu's public reprimand of the Obama administration's Iran negotiations, Rice relayed to Abraham Foxman that, "in her view, the Israeli leader did everything but use 'the N-word' in describing the president." However, in July 2014, Rice expressed support for Israel's right to defend itself during the 2014 Israel–Gaza conflict. She stated: "When countries single out Israel for unfair treatment at the UN, it isn't just a problem for Israel, it is a problem for all of us." In 2015, Rice criticized Netanyahu for agreeing to speak to Congress about Iran's nuclear program without coordinating with the Obama administration. She negotiated a new memorandum of understanding between the U.S. and Israel in 2016 for $38 billion in military assistance, the largest such package in Israel's history.

The Obama administration supported the Saudi-and Emirati-led intervention in Yemen and blockade of Yemen, but Rice opposed a coalition attack on the port city of Al Hudaydah and personally called UAE crown prince Mohammed bin Zayed to stop the planned offensive.

=== Africa ===
Rice supported South Sudanese independence and initial U.S. aid to the government of President Salva Kiir. When the South Sudanese Civil War broke out in 2013 between President Kiir's forces and forces led by vice president Riek Machar, the U.S. continued its support for the Kiir administration despite reports from U.S. embassy staff of atrocities committed by the government. Rice ultimately joined calls for an arms embargo against South Sudan in 2016, but the measure failed to win passage at the UN Security Council.

Rice was perceived as having a strong personal rapport with Rwanda's president Paul Kagame. Some critics of the Obama administration's Africa policy faulted Rice for what they viewed as the U.S.'s failure to take action against Rwanda for its role in the Kivu conflict.

=== Afghanistan ===
On a visit to Pakistan in 2015, Rice warned Pakistani political and military leaders that attacks in Afghanistan by militants based in Pakistan threatened regional security. Rice also delivered an invitation from Obama for Prime Minister Nawaz Sharif to visit the United States in October. The meetings came at a tense time for Pakistan's relations with neighboring Afghanistan and archrival India, along with uncertainty over whether the United States would release $300 million in military aid to Pakistan.

=== China ===
In a 2015 speech on China–United States relations, Rice noted the problems of Chinese intelligence operations in the United States, saying, "This is not a mild irritation. It is an economic and national security concern to the United States. It puts enormous strain on our bilateral relationship, and it is a critical factor in determining the future trajectory of U.S.–China ties."

== Post-Obama administration (2017–2021) ==
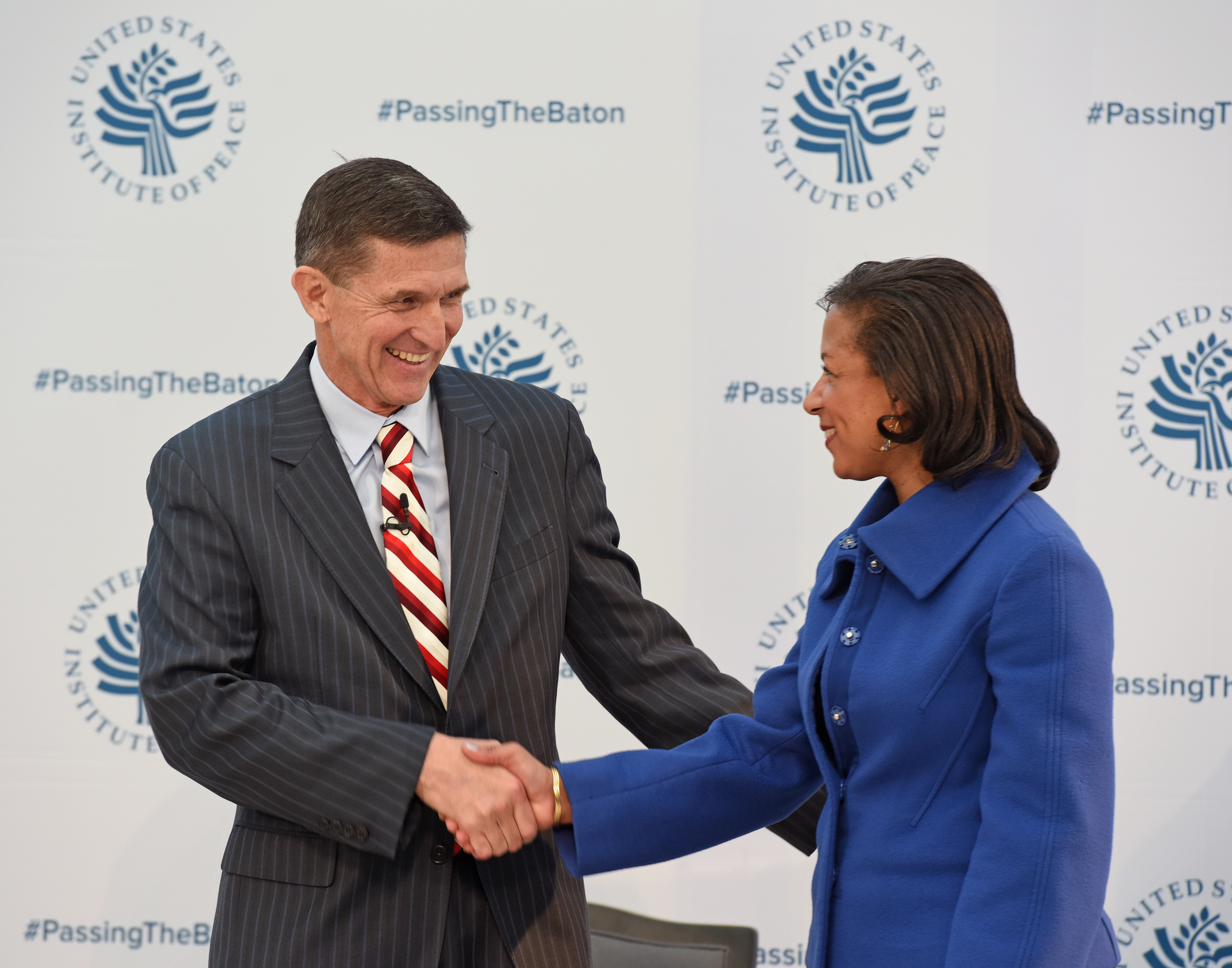
Rice shakes hands with National Security Advisor Designate Michael Flynn on January 10, 2017.

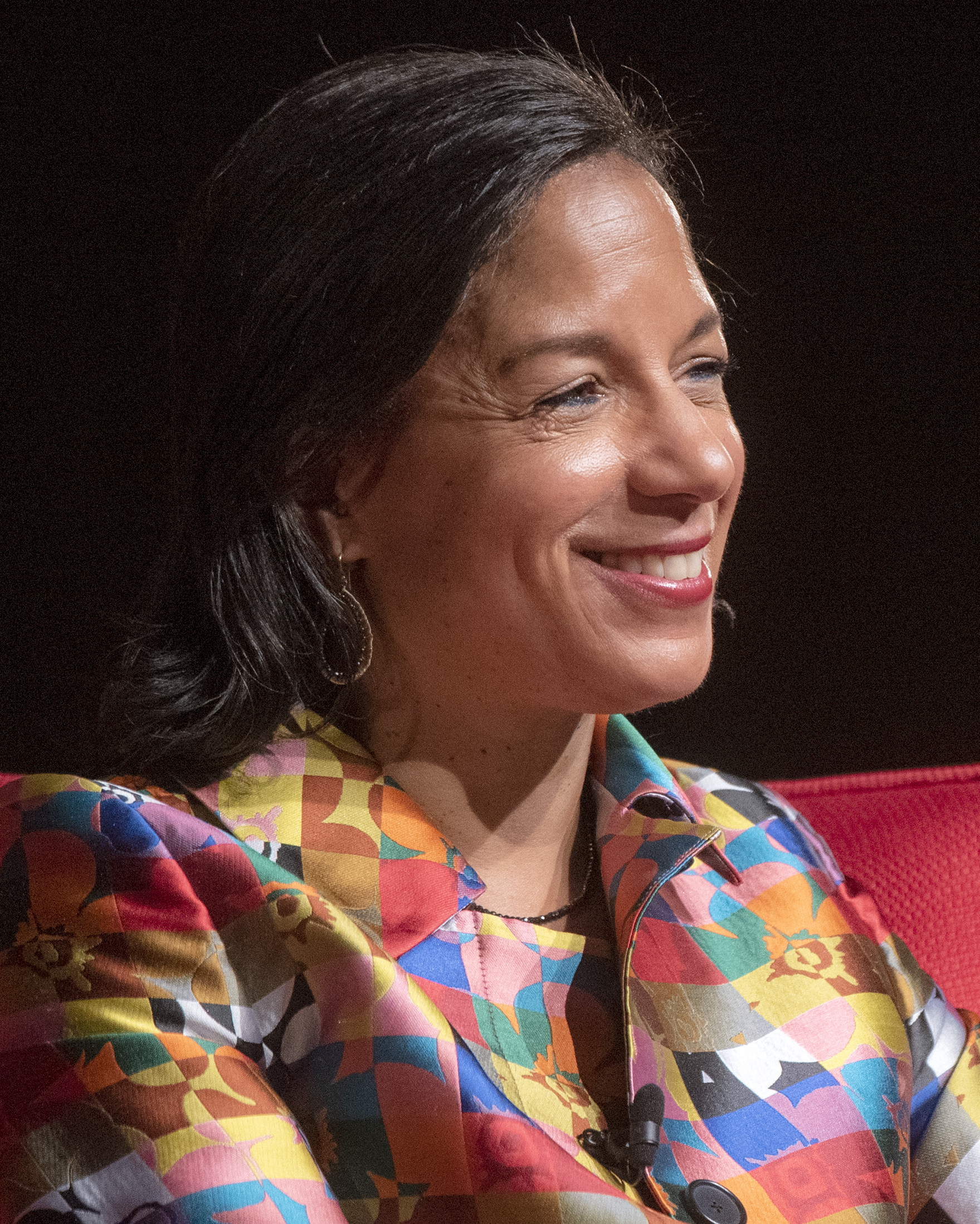
Rice at the Lyndon B. Johnson Presidential Library in 2019

=== Private sector positions ===
On March 8, 2017, Rice became a distinguished visiting research fellow in the School of International Service (SIS) at American University. In her residency, she planned to work on her next book and to mentor young SIS students.

On March 28, 2018, Rice was appointed to the board of directors at Netflix.

=== Unmasking investigations ===
On April 3, 2017, Eli Lake reported in Bloomberg View that as national security advisor, Rice had requested that the identities of some Americans mentioned in intelligence reports related to the campaign and presidential transition of Donald Trump be unmasked. Any request for an American's identity to be unmasked required approval by the National Security Agency; the agency's director, Michael Rogers, said it evaluated each request to determine "Is there a valid need to know in the course of the execution of their official duties?" and "Is the identification necessary to truly understand the context of the intelligence value that the report is designed to generate?" Rice said that she asked for identities of U.S. persons to be revealed to provide context to the intelligence reports, and not for political purposes.

The report of Rice unmasking Trump officials followed an announcement by Devin Nunes, the Republican chair of the House Intelligence Committee, "that he had seen reports indicating that Mr. Trump or his associates might have been 'incidentally' swept up in the monitoring of foreigners". The committee was investigating both Trump's ties to Russian attempts to influence the 2016 election and Trump's allegations that Obama had Trump Tower under surveillance. Lake's April 3 report of the unmasking specified "Rice's requests to unmask the names of Trump transition officials do not vindicate Trump's own tweets from March 4 in which he accused Obama of illegally tapping Trump Tower." Nevertheless, some Republicans called for an investigation into the unmasking while Democrats said that the unmasking story was a diversion from the investigation into Russian interference in the 2016 United States elections.

After members of the House and Senate Intelligence Committees were able to view the material on which Nunes based his assertions, both Democrats and Republicans familiar with the material said that there was "no evidence that Obama administration officials did anything unusual or illegal". Congressional intelligence sources called Rice's unmasking requests "normal and appropriate" for a national security adviser.

In August 2017, Eli Lake reported in Bloomberg View that Rice's successor as national security adviser, H. R. McMaster, "has concluded that Rice did nothing wrong".

Rice testified to the House Intelligence Committee in September 2017 that she requested the unmasking because of a redacted intelligence report concerning an undisclosed visit to the United States by United Arab Emirates crown prince Mohammed bin Zayed Al Nahyan in December 2016. During the visit, al-Nahyan met with Trump campaign advisors Steve Bannon, Michael Flynn, and Jared Kushner at Trump Tower in New York. Rice's testimony appeared to allay the concerns of Republicans, with Committee member Mike Conaway stating, "She was a good witness, answered all our questions. I'm not aware of any reason to bring her back."

In May 2020, Attorney General Bill Barr appointed federal prosecutor John Bash to examine unmasking conducted by the Obama administration. The inquiry concluded in October 2020 with no findings of substantive wrongdoing. Bash's 52-page report, previously classified top secret, was released in May 2022. Bash wrote he had found no evidence that any unmasking requests were made for any political or otherwise improper reasons during the 2016 election period or the ensuing presidential transition.

=== Political positions ===
Rice criticized the United States' close relationship with Saudi Arabia because of the murder of journalist Jamal Khashoggi, Saudi Arabia's human rights abuses, Saudi Arabia's diplomatic dispute with Canada, Saudi Arabian-led intervention in Yemen and Saudi Arabian-led blockade against Qatar. Rice also criticized Trump's decision to withdraw U.S. troops from Syria, which critics say gave Turkey the green light to invade and occupy northern Syria and attack Kurdish forces, who had assisted the U.S. in the destruction of the Islamic State.

In June 2020 Rice criticized Israeli proposals to annex parts of the West Bank and Jordan Valley, stating that such a move would make it more difficult to sustain traditionally bipartisan support for Israel in the United States. Rice takes the view that a two-state solution is the only way to keep Israel both a Jewish and democratic state. Rice was part of the Biden administration team that launched the U.S. National Strategy to Counter Antisemitism on May 25, 2023.

=== Consideration of 2020 U.S. Senate campaign ===
After U.S. senator Susan Collins from Maine voted to confirm Brett Kavanaugh to the Supreme Court, Rice publicly considered challenging Collins in 2020, before announcing in April 2019 that she would not run for Senate.

== Director of Domestic Policy Council (2021–2023) ==
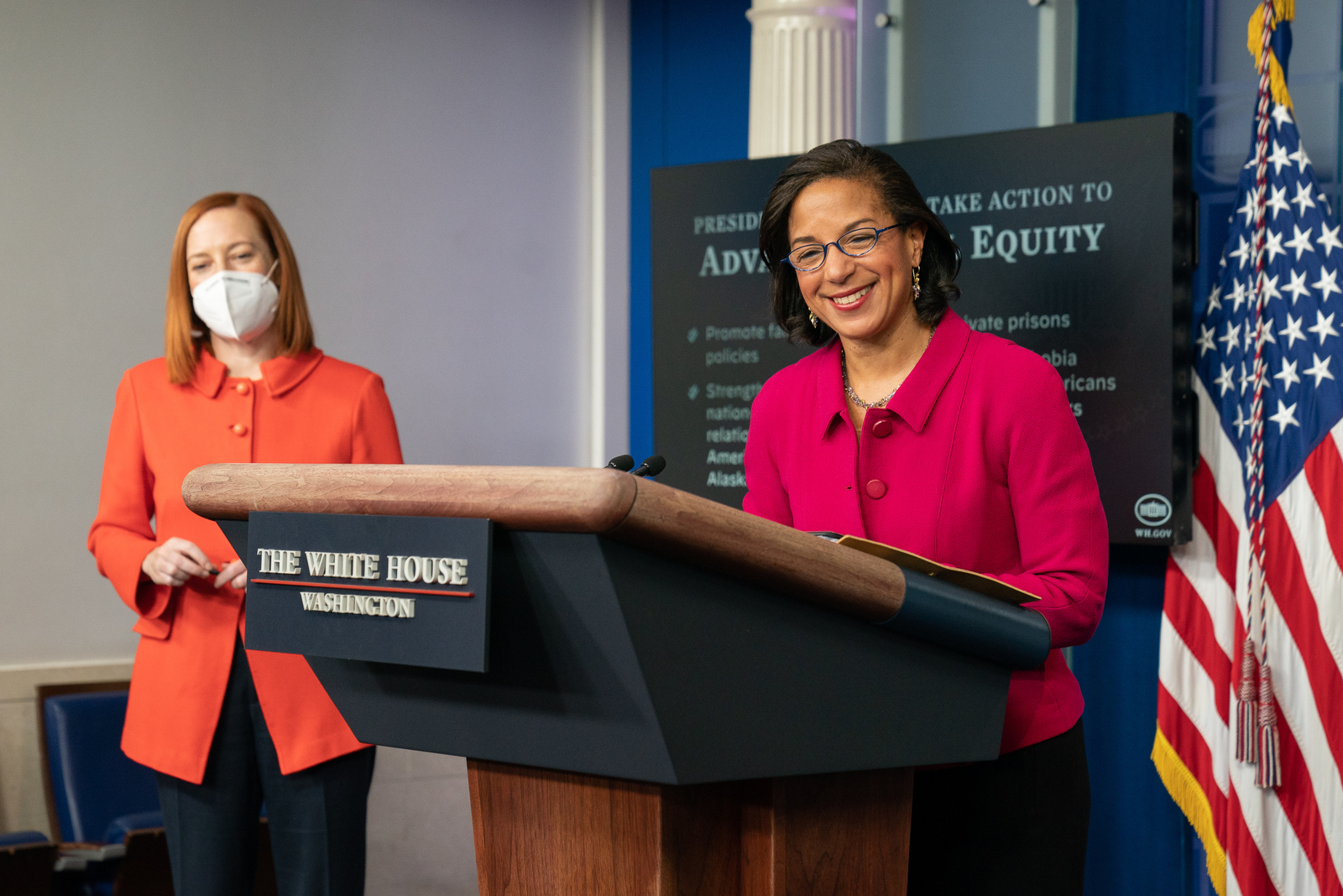
Rice speaks from the White House briefing room in January 2021.

In July 2020, it was widely reported that Rice was under consideration to be Joe Biden's vice presidential running mate in the 2020 general election. However, Kamala Harris was selected as Biden's running mate on August 11, 2020.

On September 5, 2020, Rice was announced to be a member of the advisory council of the Biden-Harris Transition Team, which planned the Biden's presidential transition. In November, she was named a candidate for secretary of state in the Biden Administration.

Biden chose Rice to head the Domestic Policy Council. This was considered a surprise by many political commentators, noting her experience in foreign policy over domestic policy.

In April 2023, journalist Hannah Dreier suggested in a New York Times article that Rice was among the leading White House officials who may have been negligent in response to the uncovered migrant child labor crisis.

On April 24, 2023, President Biden announced that Rice would be departing from her position as director of the Domestic Policy Council on May 26, 2023. On May 24, 2023, she touted her work in domestic and national security policy initiatives during her tenure at the White House.

== Affiliations ==
Rice is a distinguished visiting research fellow at American University's School of International Service and non-resident senior fellow at the Belfer Center for Science and International Affairs at Harvard University's John F. Kennedy School of Government. She is also a contributing opinion writer for the New York Times. She is currently on the board of Netflix and is a member of the Aspen Strategy Group, the American Academy of Diplomacy, and the Council on Foreign Relations.

Rice is a member of the Defense Policy Board Advisory Committee.

In February 2026, Rice stated on the Stay Tuned with Preet podcast that if the Democratic Party won the 2026 United States elections, she believed there would be an "accountability agenda" for corporations' actions to appease Trump during his second term. Trump called for the "immediate" removal of Rice from the board of Netflix in a Truth Social post, linked to an X post by far-right activist Laura Loomer that expressed opposition to the proposed acquisition of Warner Bros. Discovery by Netflix.

== Personal life ==
Rice married former ABC News executive producer Ian Officer Cameron on September 12, 1992, at the St. Albans School chapel in Washington D.C. They met as students at Stanford and have two children.

While they have the same surname and have held the same White House post, Susan Rice and Condoleezza Rice are unrelated. The Hill and others have notably mistaken the Democratic national security advisor for her Republican counterpart.

== Honors and awards ==
Rice was inducted into Stanford's Black Alumni Hall of Fame in 2002. In 2017, President François Hollande named Rice a commander of the Legion of Honour for her contributions to Franco-American relations.

=== Foreign honors ===
Foreign honors

Country	Date	Decoration	Post-nominal letters
France	2017 – Present	Commander of the Legion of Honour	

=== Scholastic ===
University Degrees

Location	Date	School	Degree
California	1986	Stanford University	Honors Bachelor of Arts (BA) in History
England	1988	New College, Oxford	Master of Philosophy (M.Phil.) in International Relations
England	1990	New College, Oxford	Doctor of Philosophy (D.Phil.) in International Relations

Chancellor, visitor, governor, rector and fellowships

Location	Date	School	Position
England	2014 – Present	New College, Oxford	Honorary Fellow
District of Columbia	2017 – Present	The School of International Service at American University	Distinguished Visiting Research Fellow
Massachusetts	2017 – Present	The Belfer Center for Science and International Affairs at Harvard University	Senior Fellow

=== Honorary degrees ===
Honorary degrees

Location	Date	School	Degree	Gave Commencement Address
Georgia (U.S. state)	2010	Spelman College	Doctorate	Yes
District of Columbia	2012	Howard University	Doctor of Laws (LL.D)	No
Maine	2018	Bowdoin College	Doctor of Laws (LL.D)	No

=== Memberships and fellowships ===
Location	Date	Organisation	Position
District of Columbia	2002 – 2009	Brookings Institution	Senior Fellow

== Publications ==
- Rice, Susan E. (1990). The Commonwealth Initiative in Zimbabwe, 1979–1980: Implications for International Peacekeeping (PhD thesis). New College, Oxford. hdl:10068/472379. ProQuest 301495377.
- Rice, Susan E.; Graff, Corinne; Pascual, Carlos, eds. (2010). Confronting Poverty: Weak States and U.S. National Security. Washington, DC: Brookings Institution Press. ISBN 978-0-8157-0435-5. OCLC 607553724.
- Rice, Susan E. (October 8, 2019). Tough Love: My Story of the Things Worth Fighting For. New York: Simon & Schuster. ISBN 978-1-5011-8997-5. OCLC 1103670293.

== See also ==
- Foreign policy of the Obama administration
- List of African-American United States Cabinet members
- List of ambassadors appointed by Barack Obama
- List of female ambassadors of the United States
- List of female United States Cabinet members

Political offices
Preceded by George Moose	Assistant Secretary of State for African Affairs; 1997–2001	Succeeded by Walter Kansteiner
Preceded by Tom Donilon	National Security Advisor; 2013–2017	Succeeded by Mike Flynn
Preceded by Brooke Rollins; Acting	Director of the Domestic Policy Council; 2021–2023	Succeeded by Neera Tanden
Diplomatic posts
Preceded by Zalmay Khalilzad	United States ambassador to the United Nations; 2009–2013	Succeeded by Rosemary DiCarlo; Acting
