= Walter E. North =

American diplomat

Walter North
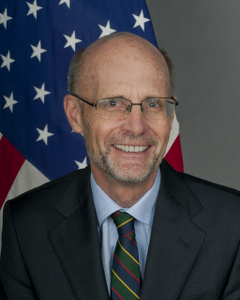

United States Ambassador to the Solomon Islands
- In office January 31, 2013 – January 22, 2016
- President: Barack Obama
- Preceded by: Teddy Taylor
- Succeeded by: Catherine Ebert-Gray

United States Ambassador to Papua New Guinea
- In office December 4, 2012 – January 22, 2016
- President: Barack Obama
- Preceded by: Teddy Taylor
- Succeeded by: Catherine Ebert-Gray

United States Ambassador to Vanuatu
- In office February 19, 2013 – January 22, 2016
- President: Barack Obama
- Preceded by: Teddy Taylor
- Succeeded by: Catherine Ebert-Gray

Personal details
- Born: 1950 (age 75–76)
- Education: Lawrence University; Harvard University; George Washington University

Walter North is an American diplomat. He served as the United States Ambassador to Papua New Guinea, Solomon Islands and Vanuatu between 2012 and 2016. He began his service as ambassador on December 4, 2012.

== Early life and education ==
North grew up in Mount Hermon, Massachusetts. In 1972 he received a BA in Theatre-Drama at Lawrence University in Appleton, Wisconsin. He graduated from the George Washington University Law School with a J.D. In 1990 he earned an MPA at Harvard University's Kennedy School of Government.

== Career ==
North joined the Peace Corps after college graduation and served as a volunteer in Ethiopia for two years. He worked in Bonga and Addis Ababa. He also served as a project manager in India and Bangladesh for CARE International, a humanitarian non-profit.

North joined USAID in 1980 and held a variety of roles in that organization before becoming confirmed as a U.S. ambassador. Between 1992 and 2004, he held several assignments outside the U.S., including ones in Addis Ababa, Ethiopia, Lusaka, Zambia and in New Delhi, India.

== Personal ==
North is married to Dr. Judy Ryon, and they have two children.

Diplomatic posts
Preceded by Teddy Taylor	United States Ambassador to Vanuatu; 2012–2016	Succeeded by Catherine Ebert-Gray
Preceded by Teddy Taylor	United States Ambassador to Papua New Guinea; 2012–2016	Succeeded by Catherine Ebert-Gray
Preceded by Teddy Taylor	United States Ambassador to the Solomon Islands; 2013–2016	Succeeded by Catherine Ebert-Gray
