= Tough Love: My Story of the Things Worth Fighting For =

2019 book by Susan Rice

- First edition
- Author: Susan E. Rice
- Language: English
- Genre: Non-fiction
- Publisher: Simon & Schuster
- Publication date: October 8, 2019
- ISBN: 9781501189975 hard cover
- Preceded by: Confronting Poverty: Weak States and U.S. National Security (2010)

Tough Love: My Story of the Things Worth Fighting For is a 2019 nonfiction book published by Simon & Schuster by Susan Rice, who had served as United States Ambassador to the United Nations and as National Security Adviser under President Barack Obama.

== Reception ==
The review in The New York Times described Rice's "retelling of the foreign policy decisions of the Clinton and Obama administrations" as "clinical." The Times described how Rice had become a "lightning rod of partisan hatred" as she suffered the fallout for the Benghazi affair. Rice writes that she is most comfortable in the "policy-focused, behind-the-scenes roles" but was thrust into the limelight as a major player in Benghazi.

NPR called her memoir "candid" and said that she told her personal story with honesty.

Publishers Weekly called the book a "stellar debut memoir" of Rice's "public service career".

== Publication ==
- Hard cover – ISBN 9781501189975
- Paperback – ISBN 9781501189982
- eBook – ISBN 9781501189999
- Audiobook (unabridged) – ISBN 9781508296997
