= Harvey Feldman =

American diplomat

Harvey Julien Feldman (June 25, 1931 – February 24, 2009) was an American diplomat best known for planning the 1972 Nixon visit to China.

== Personal life ==
Feldman was born in Brooklyn, New York. He attended the University of Chicago as both an undergraduate and a master's student in Chinese studies, receiving his M.A. in 1954. While still a student in 1952, he married his first wife, Carolina (Carol) Borja Feldman, a classmate at the University of Chicago. Their marriage ended in divorce. After their divorce, she died in 1981. He married his second wife Laura Sherman in 1976.

== Career ==
Feldman served in Hong Kong for eight years, Taiwan for six, and Japan for four years. As a member of the Policy Planning Staff of the State Department, he helped plan U.S. president Richard Nixon's first visit to China in 1972. He continued involvement with the process of relations with China when he became the Director of the Office of Republic of China Affairs in September 1977. In that capacity, he and Lee Marks began to draft the Taiwan Relations Act at the request of Richard Holbrooke; the act would be passed into law in 1979. He also created the American Institute in Taiwan which replaced the U.S. embassy in Taipei after relations were shifted to Beijing. On August 2, 1979, he was appointed to the position of U.S. ambassador to Papua New Guinea and the Solomon Islands, resident in Port Moresby, the capital of PNG; he held that position until May 25, 1981. He later served as an alternative U.S. representative to the United Nations, an ambassadorial-rank position and his final role in the State Department. He retired in 1986.

== Retirement and death ==
After his retirement, Feldman continued his involvement with China affairs. In 1989, he met with then-ROC president Lee Teng-hui and advised him on potential strategies for helping the ROC to regain membership in the United Nations. In 1994, he became a fellow in China Policy of The Heritage Foundation, a conservative think tank. In 2007, he spoke out against remarks by United States National Security Council Senior Director for Asian Affairs Dennis Wilder stating that "Taiwan, or the Republic of China, is not at this point a state in the international community"; Feldman responded that U.S. government had no basis under law to oppose ROC membership in international bodies.

Outside of his China-related activities, Feldman was also a board member of the Jewish Institute for National Security Affairs and a partner in consultancy firm Global Business Access. He died on February 24, 2009, at the age of 77 due to complications from aortic dissection. He was survived by two sons from his marriage to Carol Borja Feldman (Chris Feldman and Peter Feldman), as well as his second wife Laura Sherman and their son Alex Feldman, as well as a sister, four grandchildren, and three great-granddaughters.

== Works ==
- Feldman, Harvey; Kim, Ilpyong J.; Kau, Michael Y. M., eds. (1988), Taiwan in a time of transition, New York: Paragon House, ISBN 978-0-943852-64-5
- Bosco, Joseph; Feldman, Harvey (1991), Taiwan in the modern world: Constitutional reform and the future of the Republic of China, Studies of the East Asian Institute, M. E. Sharpe, ISBN 978-0-87332-880-7
- Feldman, Harvey (1995), Taiwan and the United Nations: conflict between domestic policies and international objectives, Essays in public policy #64, Hoover Institution on War, Revolution, and Peace, ISBN 978-0-8179-5692-9
- Feldman, Harvey J. (1999), 臺灣關係法的回顧與展望, in 楊基銓 [Yang Wei-chuan] (ed.), 臺灣關係法二十年 [The Taiwan Relations Act at Twenty] (in Chinese (Taiwan)), Taipei: 前衛 [Avanguard], ISBN 978-957-801-221-9
- Dillion, Dana R.; Feldman, Harvey J.; Hwang, Balbina Y.; Tkacik, John J. (2005), Asia's security challenges, Washington, DC: Heritage Foundation, OCLC 62332693

Diplomatic posts
Preceded by Mary Seymour Olmsted	United States Ambassador to Papua New Guinea and the Solomon Islands; August 2, 1979 – May 25, 1981	Succeeded by M. Virginia Schafer
