= Catherine Ebert-Gray =

American diplomat (born 1955)

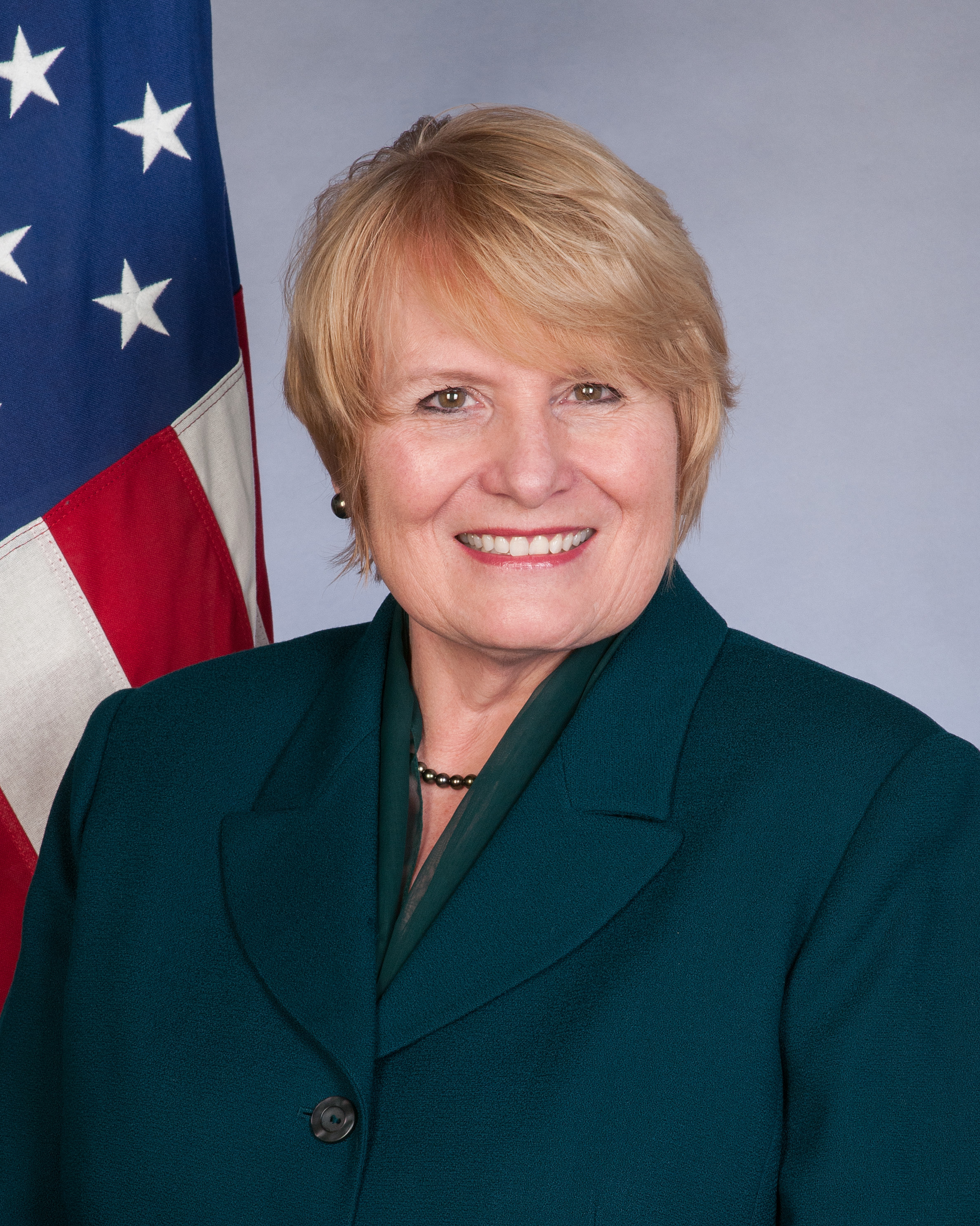

United States Ambassador to the Solomon Islands
- In office April 14, 2016 – November 17, 2019
- President: Barack Obama; Donald Trump
- Preceded by: Walter E. North
- Succeeded by: Erin Elizabeth McKee

United States Ambassador to Papua New Guinea
- In office February 23, 2016 – November 17, 2019
- President: Barack Obama; Donald Trump
- Preceded by: Walter E. North
- Succeeded by: Erin Elizabeth McKee

United States Ambassador to Vanuatu
- In office July 5, 2016 – November 17, 2019
- President: Barack Obama; Donald Trump
- Preceded by: Walter E. North
- Succeeded by: Erin Elizabeth McKee

Personal details
- Born: 1955 (age 70–71) Appleton, Wisconsin, U.S.
- Education: University of Wisconsin–Madison; Dwight D. Eisenhower School for National Security and Resource Strategy

Catherine Ebert-Gray (born 1955) is an American diplomat. She served as the United States ambassador to Papua New Guinea, Solomon Islands and Vanuatu from 2016 to 2019.

== Early life and education ==
Born Catherine Ebert in Appleton, Wisconsin, she lived in Neenah and Menasha, Wisconsin as well as Chicago and Detroit before she graduated from Appleton West High School. She developed an interest in history and the Pacific from her father, a veteran who served on the USS Chanticleer in the Pacific theater. She earned her bachelor's degrees in international relations and political science from the University of Wisconsin-Madison. Later she received a master's degree in national resource management from the Dwight D. Eisenhower School for National Security and Resource Strategy.

== Career ==
Ebert-Gray began her career as an analyst in the Hawaii State Legislature. In 1988 she joined the United States Foreign Service and subsequently served in several international locations, including Mali, Morocco, Togo, Egypt, Germany, the Philippines, Papua New Guinea, and Australia.

When she was nominated by President Barack Obama to become U.S. Ambassador, she was serving as Deputy Assistant Secretary of State in the Bureau of Administration's Office of Logistics Management, a role she had held since 2011. On February 11, 2016, Ebert-Gray arrived in Port Moresby after having been confirmed on December 9, 2015, by the United States Senate. Her swearing-in as the U.S. Ambassador to Papua New Guinea, Vanuatu and the Solomon Islands took place on January 22, 2016. Her mission ended on November 17, 2019.

== Personal ==
She is married to Australian Ian Gray, and they have two children.
