= Mary Olmsted =

American diplomat (1919–2018)

Personal details
- Born: September 28, 1919 Duluth, Minnesota, U.S.
- Died: July 13, 2018 (aged 98) Bowie, Maryland, U.S.
- Education: Mount Holyoke College (BA); Columbia University (MA)
- Occupation: Diplomat

Mary Seymour Olmsted (September 28, 1919 – July 13, 2018) was the first female U.S. Ambassador to a Pacific Islands nation and was the first American ambassador in Papua New Guinea from 1975 to 1979. Gerald Ford appointed her to establish the embassy which was formally opened in September 1975. In 1978, Jimmy Carter appointed her to serve concurrently as ambassador to the Solomon Islands.

== Career and awards ==
Her early career included working at the Central Hanover Bank and Trust Company in the security analysis division and the National Bureau of Economic Research.

While assigned to the embassy in Greece, she worked with Charles Yost.

Olmsted established Endowed Fellowship at the University of Hawaii specifically for students from Papua New Guinea.

In 2011, she was one of several to win the National Women's Political Caucus “Women of Courage” award in recognition of being the first president of the Women's Action Organization (WAO) of the State Department.

== Personal life and education ==
Olmsted was born in Duluth, Minnesota. She moved to Titusville, Florida in 1925. Olmsted joined the foreign service after receiving her B.A. from Mount Holyoke College in 1941 and her M.A. from Columbia University in 1945. She studied at the Fletcher School of Law and Diplomacy for a year, but moved on to the State Department and left before attaining a degree.

Olmsted died from complications from dementia at her home in a retirement community.
