= Everett E. Bierman =

American diplomat

- Born: 16 August 1924; Hastings, Nebraska
- Occupation: American Ambassador
- Known for: American Ambassador to Papua New Guinea and the Solomon Islands

Everett E. Bierman (August 16, 1924, Hastings, Nebraska - July 23, 2017) was the Ambassador of the United States of America to Papua New Guinea and to the Solomon Islands. While he was there, on January 21, 1987, Ronald Reagan announces his intention to nominate Bierman to be Ambassador to the Republic of Vanuatu. A new position, it was to be served concurrently.

Bierman began his career with the Federal Government in 1948 as an information officer for the Department of Agriculture. He left Agriculture in 1951 to work as the information directorship of the National 4-H Foundation in Washington, DC. From 1967 to 1986, Bierman was minority staff director of the House Committee on Foreign Affairs.

He graduated from Purdue University (B.S., 1948) and the American University (M.S., 1958, communications).
