= Leslie V. Rowe =

American diplomat

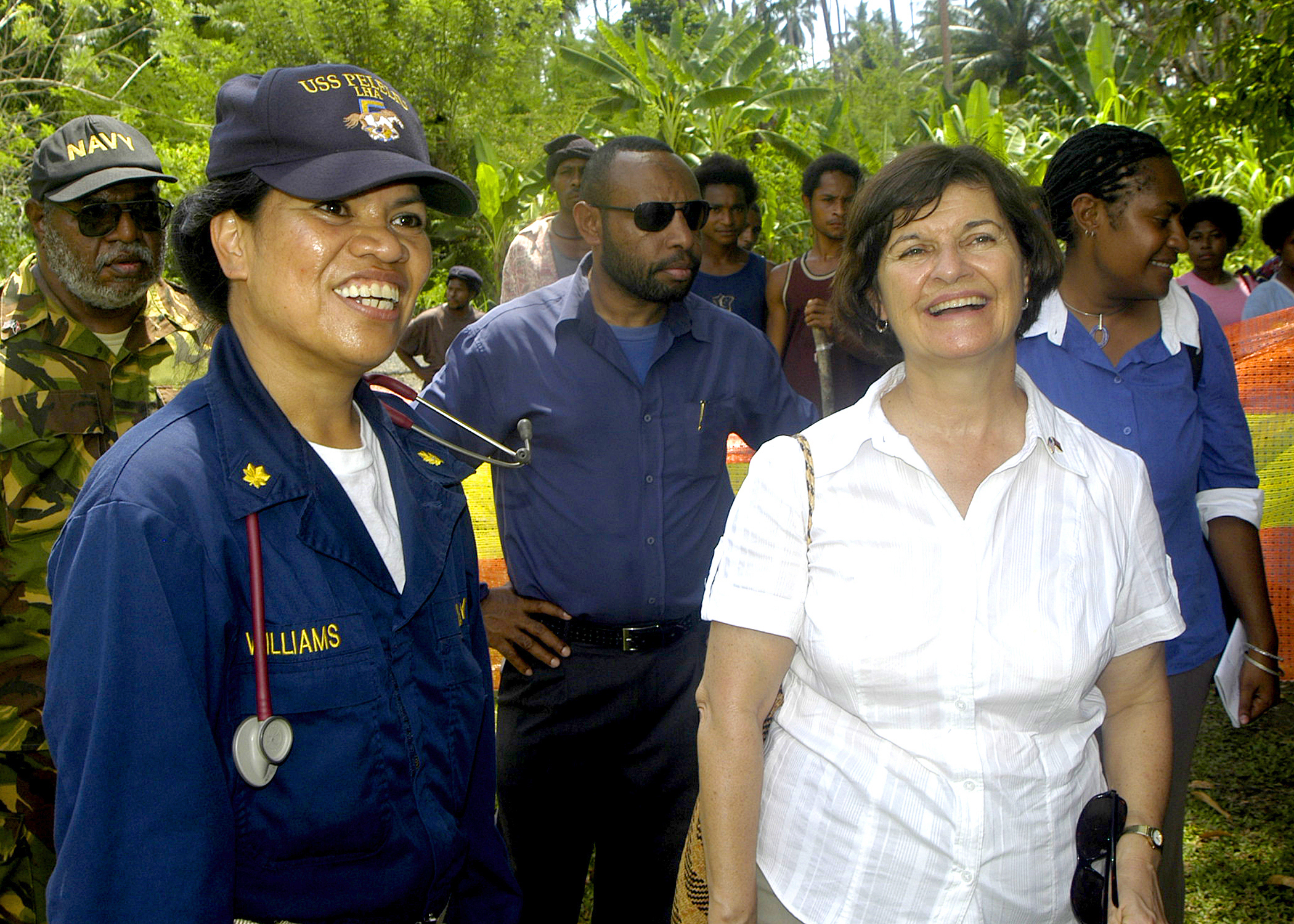
US Navy 070815-N-1752H-174 The Honorable Leslie V. Rowe, U.S. Ambassador to Papua New Guinea, Solomon Islands and Vanuatu, takes a tour of Miak Health Clinic with Lt. Cmdr. Leila Williams

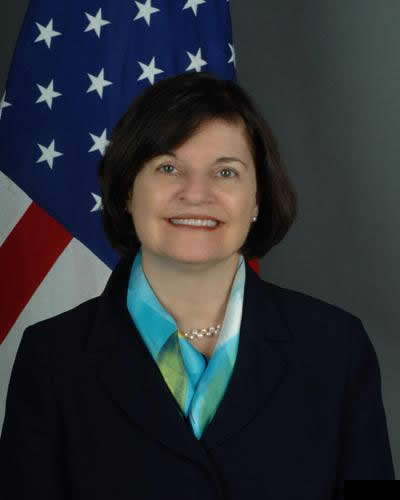
Leslie V Rowe ambassador

Leslie Ventura Rowe (born 1947) is a retired career diplomat who served as the American ambassador to Mozambique (2010–2012) as well as Papua New Guinea, Solomon Islands and Vanuatu (2006–2009). In January 2013, she joined the new U.S. Office of Global Health Diplomacy. Previously, she was Deputy Chief of Mission at the U.S. Embassy in Nairobi, Kenya.

== Education ==
Rowe received a B.A. from Washington State University, an M.A. from the Fletcher School of Law and Diplomacy at Tufts University and an M.Ed. from Northeastern University.
