= Judith Chammas =

American diplomat

Judith Chammas is a retired American diplomat. She was the deputy chief of the Embassy of the United States, Dhaka under Ambassador Harry K Thomas. She is the former deputy chief of mission in Morocco.

== Career ==
Chammas warned M Morshed Khan, Foreign Minister of Bangladesh, that the 2005 Bangladesh bombings would harm the image of Bangladesh as a moderate Muslim country. Speaker of the Jatiya Sangsad Jamiruddin Sircar was critical of her comments on the terror attacks. She was also critical of the 2004 Dhaka grenade attack which aimed to eliminate the leadership of Awami League and described it as a threat to democracy in Bangladesh. She called for investigation into the Jamaat-ul-Mujahideen Bangladesh and its alleged ties with politicians including those from the Bangladesh Nationalist Party and Bangladesh Jamaat-e-Islami.

At a meeting of the American Chamber of Commerce in Bangladesh, Chammas stated that Bangladesh needed 7 to 9 % growth rate to improve the living standards of its people. She offered American financial support for anti-terrorism operations in Bangladesh. She visited Madinatul-Ulam Model Institute for Women operated by Rahmat-E-Islam Mission. She told Bdnews24.com that the United States government does not discriminate between religious and secular parties.

In March 2006, US Peace Corps suspended operations in Bangladesh over fears regarding terror attacks following the arrest of two Jamaat-ul-Mujahideen Bangladesh leaders which was praised by Chammas. Kamal Uddin Siddiqui, principal secretary to Prime Minister Khaleda Zia, told Chmmas that the second in command of Jamaat-ul-Mujahideen Bangladesh, Mahtab Khamaru, was released on the orders of Tarique Rahman, referred by Siddiqui as Wind Tunnel in reference to Hawa Bhaban. She was instrumental in renaming American Center Library, U.S. Embassy Dhaka after Archer Blood.

Chammas represented the United States at the Human Rights Council of the United Nations in 2007. In August 2010, Chammas was appointed the deputy chief of mission in Morocco. She was the U.S. embassy charge d'affairs in 2011. In September 2016, Stephanie Miley replaced Chammas as the deputy chief of mission in Morocco.

== Personal life ==
Chammas is married to Labib Chammas. In 2017, Labib Chammas was sentenced to two and a half years in prison after pleading guilty to sexually abusing a household staff member from 2010 to 2013 while Judith Chammas served as the deputy chief of mission in Morocco. The then-65-year-old also had to register as a sex offender for 15 years and pay a $15,000 fine as part of his sentence. They were staying at a State Department owned house in Morocco.
