= Jon F. Danilowicz =

American diplomat

Jon F. Danilowicz is a retired American diplomat of the Department of State. He is the Diplomat in Residence for New England providing career advice for college students in the diplomatic service. He was the deputy chief of mission of the Embassy of the United States of America in Bangladesh. He was the Charge d'Affaires ad interim of the United States Embassy in South Sudan. He was the US consul general in Peshawar.

== Early life ==
Danilowicz graduated from Saint John's High School in Shrewsbury, Massachusetts in 1985. He graduated from the Edmund A. Walsh School of Foreign Service of the Georgetown University with a Bachelor of Science in Foreign Service in 1989. He did his master's degree in National Security Studies at the Naval War College.

== Career ==
From July 2003 to July 2006, Danilowicz was the director of International Narcotics and Law Enforcement Affairs Section in Panama City, Panama. He was the State Department Faculty Advisor of the Naval War College from August 2006 to July 2007. From September 2007 to August 2011, he was the political/economic counselor at the United States Embassy in Bangladesh. From September 2011 to September 2012, he was the director of International Narcotics and Law Enforcement Affairs Section in Pakistan.

Danilowicz was the deputy chief of mission at the Embassy of the United States, Dhaka serving under Ambassador Dan W Mozena. He worked with the government to Bangladesh to sign the Trade and Investment Cooperation Forum Agreement for cooperation between Bangladesh and United States. According to The Daily Star, "During his current assignment in Bangladesh, Jon played a crucial role in the political arena and all eyes were always focused on him". He is fluent in Bengali, Spanish and Portuguese. From 2014 to 2015, he was the Consul General at the United States Consulate General in Peshawar, Pakistan.

From July 17, 2020, to August 2021, Danilowicz was the Charge d'Affaires ad interim of the Embassy of the United States, Juba in South Sudan.

Danilowicz stood for the town committee election in Auburn, Massachusetts and received 840 votes in March 2024.

Danilowicz is editor at large for the South Asia Perspectives, edited by William Milam and Mushfiqul Fazal Ansarey. He the founding editor at large of the South Asia Perspectives launched in January 2023. Md Shahriar Alam, State Minister for Foreign Affairs, criticized him for working at the South Asia Perspectives describing it as being funded by the Bangladesh Nationalist Party, and affiliation with Mushfiqul Fazal Ansarey. He was critical of Prime Minister Sheikh Hasina of Bangladesh and Biden congratulating her after her controversial election in 2024. He is also a board member of the Right to Freedom along with William Milam and Mushfiqul Fazal Ansarey.

After the resignation of Prime Minister Sheikh Hasina and the fall of Awami League government he provided some suggestions, such as asserting control over Bangladesh Army and not to set a deadline like the Fakhruddin Ahmed led Caretaker government, for the Muhammad Yunus led interim government in the South Asia Perspectives. He also expected improvements in the US-Bangladesh relationship and stated that the previous government had warmed to China to deflect criticism of its democracy and human rights record. He was also critical of India for supporting Sheikh Hasina comparing to United States support Mohammad Reza Pahlavi of Iran.
