= Mushfiqul Fazal Ansarey =

Bangladeshi diplomat

- মুশফিকুল ফজল আনসারী
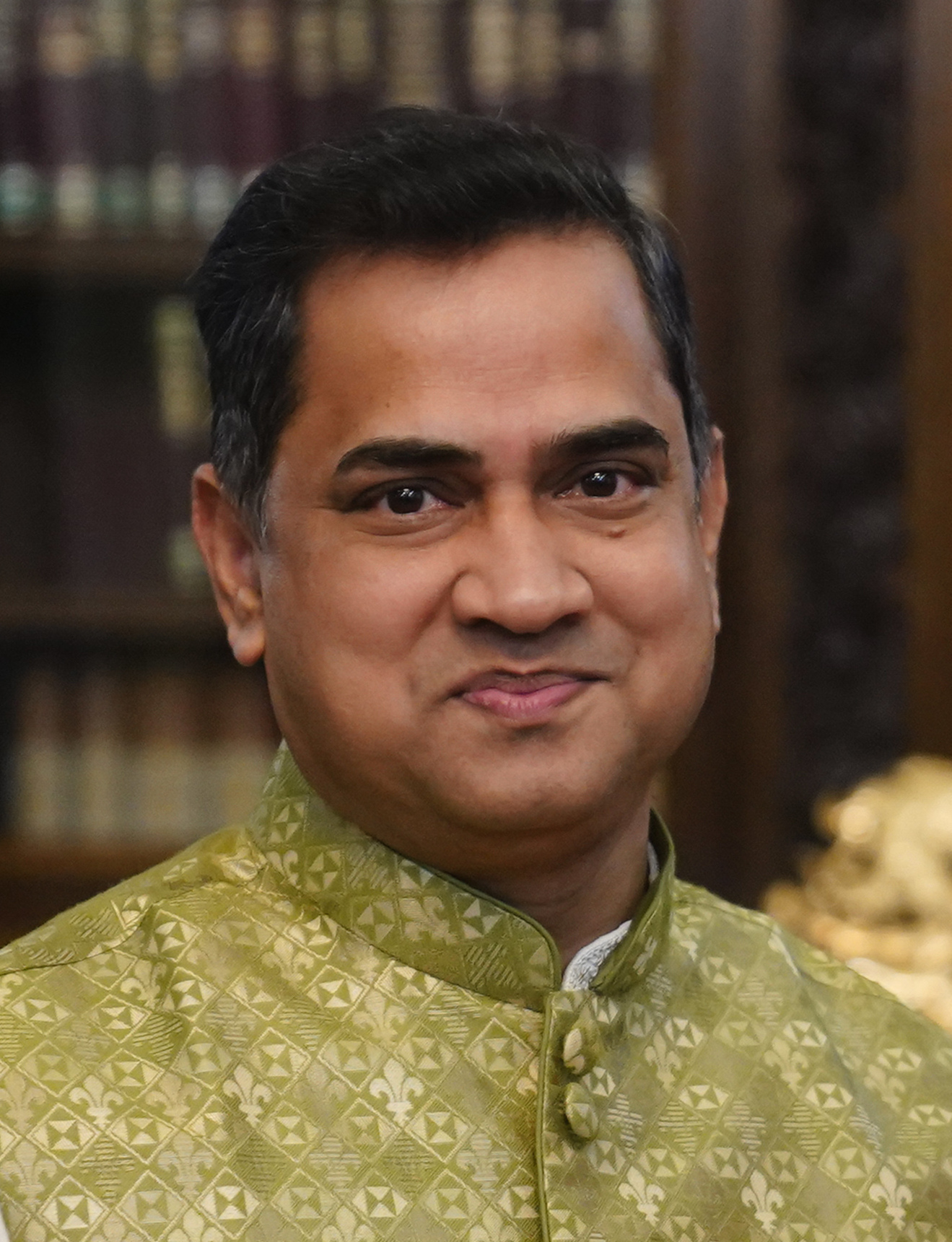
- Ansarey in 2025

Ambassador of Bangladesh to Mexico
- In office 27 January 2025 – 8 March 2026
- President: Mohammed Shahabuddin
- Prime Minister: Muhammad Yunus (Chief adviser)
- Preceded by: Abida Islam
- Succeeded by: Md Lutfor Rahman

Prime Minister's Assistant Press Secretary
- In office 10 October 2001 – 29 October 2006
- Prime Minister: Khaleda Zia

Personal details
- Education: Tejgaon College; University of Liverpool
- Website: Official website

Mushfiqul Fazal Ansarey is a Bangladeshi journalist and diplomat who served as the Ambassador of Bangladesh to Mexico, with concurrent accreditation to Guatemala, Honduras, Ecuador, and Costa Rica. He previously served as Assistant Press Secretary to Prime Minister Khaleda Zia.

He also worked as a journalist based in Washington, D.C., where he regularly participated in press briefings at the U.S. Department of State and was a permanent correspondent at the United Nations Headquarters. He is also known for his critical reporting on Prime Minister Sheikh Hasina.

== Early life and education ==
Ansarey was born in Sylhet District of Bangladesh. He completed his high school education at Rajdhani High School in Dhaka and obtained his bachelor's and master's degrees from Tejgaon College. He later pursued further studies at the University of Liverpool.

== Career ==
=== Assistant Press Secretary to Prime Minister ===
Between 2001 and 2006, Ansarey held the position of Assistant Press Secretary to Prime Minister Khaleda Zia. In June 2006, he joined a delegation, led by Harris Chowdhury, Political Secretary to the Prime Minister, to negotiate with the Bangladesh Non-government Primary Teachers Association to end their hunger strike. Other members of this delegation included Taimur Alam Khandakar and Shamsul Alam, Assistant Private Secretary to the Prime Minister. Later that year, in October, Ansarey was part of the team that delivered a congratulatory letter from Prime Minister Khaleda Zia to Muhammad Yunus following his receipt of the Nobel Peace Prize.

In 2011, Ansarey participated in a delegation led by former Prime Minister Khaleda Zia on a visit to the United States and United Kingdom. This delegation included notable figures such as Abdul Awal Mintoo, Maruf Kamal Khan, Nooruddin Ahmed, Sabiuddin Ahmed, Shafik Rehman, Shimul Biswas, and Shamsher M. Chowdhury. Following this visit, the delegation announced that the United States intended to suspend its Millennium Development Account contributions to Bangladesh until the government addressed concerns related to Muhammad Yunus.

=== Journalism and exile ===
Ansarey was an anchor on Bangladesh Television, and have reported for The Daily Ittefaq. On 7 February 2010, he organized a grassroots meeting of Bangladesh Nationalist Party activists in Sylhet District, coordinated by M Ilyas Ali. In 2012, he hosted "Hello Excellency" on NTV, interviewing foreign diplomats.

Due to political pressure during Prime Minister Sheikh Hasina's administration, Ansarey went into exile in the United States in January 2015.

Ansarey has been accredited as a White House and United Nations correspondent. At the U.S. State Department, he raised concerns regarding the fairness of elections in Bangladesh. His questions to State Department spokesman Matthew Miller, beginning with "Bangladesh PM said US wants to grab Saint Martin," attracted criticism in Bangladesh, which the former University of Dhaka Vice-Chancellor AAMS Arefin Siddique described as a "textbook case of propaganda peddling". Meanwhile, Foreign Minister Hasan Mahmud accused Ansarey of being "paid by BNP" and deliberately framing questions about Bangladesh.

In November 2022, Bangladesh Police's Counter Terrorism and Transnational Crime unit filed a case against Ansarey under the Digital Security Act, along with Pinaki Bhattacharya and Mofizur Rahman. The case was later transferred to the Dhaka Cyber Tribunal in April 2024.

Ansarey serves as the executive director of South Asia Perspectives, where former U.S. Ambassador to Bangladesh William Milam is editor, and former Deputy Chief of the U.S. Embassy in Bangladesh Jon F. Danilowicz is editor-at-large. State Minister for Foreign Affairs of Bangladesh, Shahriar Alam, criticized South Asia Perspectives, alleging it to be funded by the Bangladesh Nationalist Party. He is also a board member of Right to Freedom alongside William Milam and Jon F. Danilowicz.

=== Return from exile; diplomatic career ===
Following the resignation of Prime Minister Sheikh Hasina in August 2024, Ansarey returned to Bangladesh in September 2024. Upon his return, he was welcomed by the pro-Bangladesh Nationalist Party factions of the Bangladesh Federal Union of Journalists and Dhaka Union of Journalists at the Jatiya Press Club. He also met with former Prime Minister Khaleda Zia.

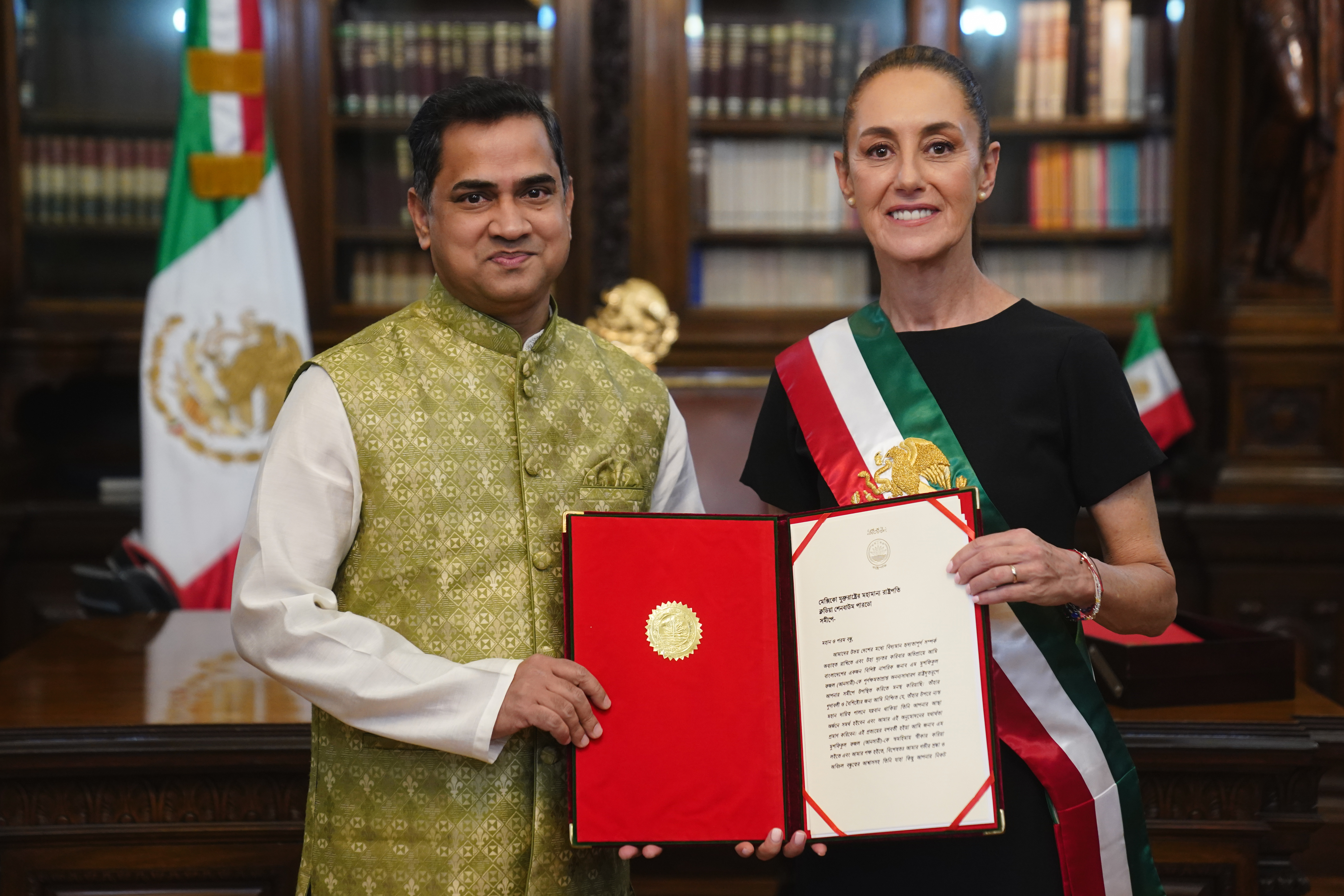
Ansarey presenting credentials as the ambassador of Bangladesh to Mexico to the President of Mexico, Claudia Sheinbaum.

On 21 October 2024, Muhammad Yunus, Chief Adviser to the interim government appointed Ansarey as the ambassador of Bangladesh to Mexico for a three-year term. Along with his primary role in Mexico, he holds concurrent accreditation in Guatemala, Honduras, Ecuador, and Costa Rica. The appointment came with the status of senior secretary in the Ministry of Foreign Affairs.
