= The Cruel Birth of Bangladesh =

- Author: Archer K. Blood
- Language: English
- Genre: non-fiction
- Published: 2002
- Publisher: University Press Limited
- Publication place: Bangladesh
- Pages: 392
- Awards: Outstanding Impact Award 2018
- ISBN: 978-9840516506
- OCLC: 52038283
- Text: The Cruel Birth of Bangladesh at Scribd

The Cruel Birth of Bangladesh: Memoirs of an American Diplomat is American diplomat Archer Blood's account of the emergence of Bangladesh, published by University Press Limited in 2002. After the State Department declassified the documents, telegrams and other messages relating to this period, Blood wrote 24 chapters describing the events of 1971 as witnessed by himself and the staff of the United States Mission in Dhaka.

The Cruel Birth of Bangladesh is part of the road to Bangladesh series, where accounts of the emergence of Bangladesh are published.

The book received the University Press Limited's "Outstanding Impact Award" at the UPL Excellence Awards 2018.
