= Jane Abell Coon =

American diplomat (born 1929)

U.S. Ambassador to Bangladesh
- In office 30 June 1981 – 3 August 1984
- President: Ronald Reagan
- Preceded by: David T. Schneider
- Succeeded by: Howard Bruner Schaffer

Personal details
- Born: May 9, 1929 (age 97) Durham, New Hampshire, U.S.

Jane Abell Coon (born May 9, 1929) is an American diplomat who served as the U.S. ambassador to Bangladesh.

== Early life ==
Jane Abell Coon was born on May 9, 1929, in Durham, New Hampshire. In 1951 she graduated from the College of Wooster. She married Carleton S. Coon Jr, in 1966, and has six stepchildren from him.

== Career ==
Coon joined the State Department as foreign affairs officer in 1951. She later worked in the State Department as an intelligence research analyst. In 1956 she was made a foreign service officer, she was stationed in Karachi in Pakistan and Bombay and New Delhi in India. In 1967 she resigned from the State Department. In 1976 she returned to the State Department and joined the Bureau of Oceans and International Environmental and Scientific Affairs as international relations officer. She served as the Director of Pakistan, Afghanistan, and Bangladesh Affairs in the State Department from 1977 to 1979. She became the Deputy Assistant Secretary of State for Near Eastern and South Asian Affairs in the State Department in 1976.

Coon was appointed the United States Ambassador to Bangladesh on June 30, 1981. She presented her credentials on August 11, 1981. Her term ended on August 3, 1984. Her husband, Carleton Stevens Coon Jr, served as the United States Ambassador to Nepal, while she was the ambassador to Bangladesh.

Diplomatic posts
Preceded by David T. Schneider	United States Ambassador to Bangladesh; 1981–1984	Succeeded by Howard Bruner Schaffer
