= Patricia A. Butenis =

American diplomat (born 1953)

Patricia Agatha Butenis
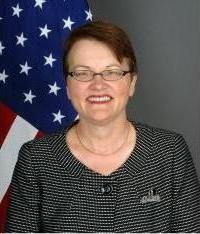

United States Ambassador to Sri Lanka
- In office September 17, 2009 – August 1, 2012
- President: Barack Obama
- Preceded by: Robert O. Blake Jr.
- Succeeded by: Michele J. Sison

United States Ambassador to the Maldives
- In office October 1, 2009 – August 1, 2012
- President: Barack Obama
- Preceded by: Robert O. Blake Jr.
- Succeeded by: Michele J. Sison

United States Ambassador to Bangladesh
- In office April 13, 2006 – June 23, 2007
- President: George W. Bush
- Preceded by: Harry K. Thomas Jr.
- Succeeded by: James F. Moriarty

Personal details
- Born: 1953 (age 72–73)
- Party: Democratic
- Education: University of Pennsylvania, Columbia University

Patricia Agatha Butenis (born 1953) is an American diplomat. During her career in the United States Foreign Service, she served as the ambassador to Bangladesh, the Maldives, and to Sri Lanka. In 2014, she retired with the rank of Career Minister.

== Early life and education ==
Butenis was born in New Jersey in 1953 to Charles P. and Haifa Butenis (née Michalezka). The eldest of three daughters, she grew up in Atco, New Jersey. She earned a Bachelor of Arts degree in anthropology from the University of Pennsylvania and a Master of Arts degree in international relations from Columbia University.

== Career ==
Butenis joined the U.S. Foreign Service in 1980 and served consular tours in Karachi, Pakistan; San Salvador, El Salvador; New Delhi, India; and Bogotá, Colombia.

As the deputy chief of mission at the U.S. Embassy in Baghdad from 2007 to 2009, Butenis won the State Department's Baker-Wilkins Award as the Outstanding Deputy Chief of Mission (2008).

She was deputy chief of mission at the U.S. Embassy in Islamabad, and after that, the U.S. Ambassador to Bangladesh from April 13, 2006 to June 23, 2007. From 2009 to 2012, Butenis was the U.S. Ambassador to Sri Lanka and the U.S. Ambassador to the Maldives.

Butenis' final career assignment was as the Dean of the School of Professional and Area Studies in the Foreign Service Institute.

Butenis sparked controversy in Sri Lanka in late 2009 when leaked diplomatic cables sent by her on verifying the accountability of war crimes that allegedly happened in the final stages of Sri Lankan Civil War (1983–2009) became public.

Diplomatic posts
Preceded by Harry K. Thomas Jr.	United States Ambassador to Bangladesh; 2006–2007	Succeeded by James F. Moriarty
Preceded by Robert O. Blake Jr.	U.S. Ambassador to Sri Lanka; 2009–2012	Succeeded by Michele J. Sison
