= James F. Moriarty =

American diplomat (born 1953)

James Francis Moriarty
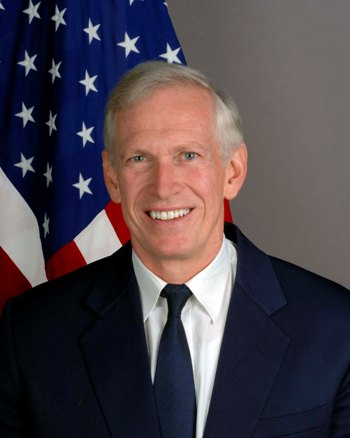

Chairman of the American Institute in Taiwan
- In office October 2016 – March 2023
- President: Barack Obama; Donald Trump; Joe Biden
- Preceded by: Raymond Burghardt
- Succeeded by: Laura Rosenberger

United States Ambassador to Bangladesh
- In office March 26, 2008 – June 17, 2011
- President: George W. Bush; Barack Obama
- Preceded by: Patricia A. Butenis
- Succeeded by: Dan Mozena

United States Ambassador to Nepal
- In office July 16, 2004 – May 22, 2007
- President: George W. Bush
- Preceded by: Michael E. Malinowski
- Succeeded by: Nancy J. Powell

Personal details
- Born: 1953 (age 72–73) Ware, Massachusetts, U.S.
- Spouse: Lauren Moriarty
- Education: Dartmouth College
- Profession: Career diplomat

James Francis Moriarty (born 1953) is an American diplomat and career foreign service officer with the rank of Minister-Counselor. He served as U.S. Ambassador to Nepal (2004–2007), U.S. Ambassador to Bangladesh (2008–2011) and Chairman of the American Institute in Taiwan (2016–2023).

== Early life and education ==
Moriarty was born in Ware, Massachusetts in 1953 to William E. Moriarty, a World War II army veteran and executive of the U.S. Postal Service. James had two brothers, a sister, and a foster brother. Like his father, he graduated from Ware High School. He earned his Bachelor of Arts in history, summa cum laude, from Dartmouth College.

== Career ==
Moriarty joined the Foreign Service in 1975. His first tour was as a consular officer in the U.S. Embassy in Rabat, Morocco. He subsequently served as a political/economic officer at the Embassy in Mbabane, Swaziland and then as an economic officer in the U.S. State Department's Office of Southern African Affairs. He married Lauren Peters, also a foreign service officer, on July 5, 1982.

After Urdu language training, he served as a political officer in Islamabad, Pakistan. On June 5, 1987, during his posting there, his father died in Ware.

Following two years of Chinese language training, Moriarty served as Deputy Chief of the political section at the U.S. Embassy in Beijing. From 1991 to 1993, he served as deputy director in the State Department's Office of UN Political Affairs. In that capacity, he coordinated U.S. policy on UN Security Council issues. He received the American Foreign Service Association’s Rivkin Award for his principled approach to the breakup of Yugoslavia. He was Diplomat-in-Resident at the East–West Center in Honolulu, Hawaii in 1993–94.

After taking a third year of Chinese language training, Moriarty led the General Affairs (Political) Section at the American Institute in Taiwan from 1994 to 1998. In 1998–2001, he served as Minister-Counselor for Political Affairs at the U.S. Embassy in Beijing. He shaped the U.S. response to Chinese missile tests in the Taiwan Strait, the U.S. bombing of the Chinese embassy in Belgrade, and the ramming of a U.S. EP-3 plane off China's Hainan Island.

Moriarty worked in the White House in 2001–2002 as National Security Council Director for China Affairs. He served in 2002–2004 as Special Assistant to the President of the United States of America and senior director at the National Security Council. He was responsible for advising on and coordinating U.S. policy on East Asia, South Asia, and the Pacific region. In these jobs he helped lay the groundwork for U.S.-China policy for the 21st century. After Taiwan passed the Referendum Act in late 2003, Moriarty flew to Taipei to deliver to President Chen Shui-bian a personal letter from President George W. Bush opposing any change to the status quo by the holding of a Taiwanese independence referendum.

In 2004, President George W. Bush nominated Moriarty to be U.S. Ambassador to Nepal. Republican Senator Jon Kyl of Arizona placed a hold on Moriarty's confirmation, alleging that while at the National Security Council, he had delayed a sale of radar equipment to Taiwan. Moriarty had pushed through a procedural change for major decisions regarding Taiwan, but his supporters said it was not intended to delay approval. Senator Kyl lifted his hold after about a month, and Moriarty's nomination was confirmed.

Mired in a civil war with Maoist insurgents since 1996, the popularity of the Nepalese monarchy was waning. On February 1, 2005, King Gyanendra dismissed parliament and declared a state of emergency. Ambassador Moriarty condemned Gyanendra's actions as undemocratic, and the US suspended lethal military assistance to his regime, but Nepalese politicians, journalists, and other civil-society advocates criticized Moriarty for taking a hard line against the Maoist insurgency while being too soft on the monarchy. Moriarty actively lobbied against the Maoists in language that earned him a reputation as unusually outspoken for a diplomat. He served as Ambassador to Nepal until 2007.

From 2008 to 2011, Moriarty was the U.S. Ambassador to Bangladesh.

Moriarty and his wife have a son and a daughter.

Diplomatic posts
Preceded by Michael Malinowski	United States Ambassador to Nepal; 2004–2007	Succeeded by Nancy Jo Powell
Preceded by Patricia A. Butenis	United States Ambassador to Bangladesh; 2008–2011	Succeeded by Dan Mozena
