= John C. Holzman =

American diplomat (born 1944)

United States Ambassador to Bangladesh
- In office August 1, 1997 – July 6, 2000
- President: Bill Clinton
- Preceded by: David Nathan Merrill
- Succeeded by: Mary Ann Peters

Personal details
- Born: 1944 (age 81–82)
- Education: Georgetown University; Johns Hopkins School of Advanced International Studies

John C. Holzman (born 1944) is an American diplomat who served as the U.S. Ambassador to Bangladesh.

== Early life ==
Holzman graduated from the Kalani High School. He completed his undergraduate at the School of Foreign Service at the Georgetown University in 1967. He completed his graduate studies from the Paul H. Nitze School of Advanced International Studies at the Johns Hopkins University in 1972.

== Career ==
In 1973, Holzman joined the United States State Department. He was the Deputy Director of the Office of Israel and Israeli Affairs in the Bureau of Near Eastern Affairs from 1986 to 1989. He served as the Deputy Chief of Mission at the American Embassy in Ghana from 1989 to 1992. From 1992 to 1994, he was the Director of the Office of Pakistan, Afghanistan and Bangladesh Affairs in the Bureau of South Asian Affairs. From 1992 to 1994 he served as the Director of the Office of Pakistan, Afghanistan and Bangladesh Affairs in the Bureau of South Asian Affairs. From 1994 to 1997, he served as the Deputy Chief of Mission at the American Embassy in Islamabad, Pakistan. He was appointed the United States AMbassador to Bangladesh on August 1, 1997. He presented his credentials in Dhaka on September 2, 1997. He left his post on July 6, 2000. He served as a foreign policy adviser at the U.S. Pacific Command and at U.S. Central Command. He was in charge of the team that created the American Embassy from the Coalition Provisional Authority in Iraq. In July 2013, he was elected as the Chairman of the Board of Regents of the University of Hawaiʻi System.

== Personal life ==
Holzman is married to Kim Hom, they have three children.

Diplomatic posts
| Preceded by David Nathan Merrill | United States Ambassador to Bangladesh; 1997–2000 | Succeeded by Mary Ann Peters |
