= Willard Ames De Pree =

American diplomat (1928–2018)

U.S. Ambassador to Bangladesh
- In office October 5, 1987 – August 17, 1990
- President: Ronald Reagan
- Preceded by: Howard Bruner Schaffer
- Succeeded by: William Milam

United States Ambassador to Mozambique
- In office April 16, 1976 – July 7, 1980
- President: Gerald Ford
- Preceded by: Johnnie Carson
- Succeeded by: David E. Simcox

Personal details
- Born: November 1, 1928 Zeeland, Michigan, U.S.
- Died: July 2, 2018 (aged 89) Bethesda, Maryland, U.S.

Willard Ames De Pree (November 1, 1928 – July 2, 2018) was an American career diplomat who served as the United States Ambassador to Bangladesh and Mozambique.

== Early life ==
De Pree was born on November 1, 1928, in Zeeland, Michigan, United States. In 1950 he graduated with a B.A. from Harvard College. In 1952 he completed his M.A. from the University of Michigan in Ann Arbor, Michigan. He worked as a teaching assistant in the University of Michigan from 1951 to 1953. In 1952 he worked in the State Department as a student intern. From 1954 to 1956 he served in the United States Army.

== Career ==
De Pree joined the Foreign Service in 1956. From 1956 to 1957 he worked as a college relations officer in the State Department. In 1957 he was posted to Cairo, Egypt as a consular officer. From 1958 to 1960 he worked as the economic/consular officer in Nicosia, Cyprus. From 1960 to 1961 he received training in the African area from the Northwestern University. After his training he worked as an intelligence officer in the State Department from 1961 to 1964. From 1964 to 1968 he served as the Political Officer in the United States Embassy in Accra, Ghana. From 1968 to 1970 he was the deputy chief of mission in Freetown, Sierra Leone. He attended Foreign Service Institute studying foreign policy for a year.

De Pree worked as the deputy coordinator from 1971 to 1972 at the senior seminar of the State Department. From 1972 to 1975 he was a member of the State Department's Policy Planning Staff. From 1976 to 1980 he served as the United States Ambassador to Mozambique. After his term ended he was promoted to Senior Inspector in the State Department. He worked as the Executive Assistant to the Under Secretary of State for Management from 1982 to 1983. From 1983 to 1987 he served as the Director of the Office of Management Operations in the State Department. On July 2, 1987, he was appointed the United States Ambassador to Bangladesh by President Ronald Reagan. He served as the United States Ambassador to Bangladesh from October 5, 1987, to August 17, 1990.

Diplomatic posts
Preceded by Howard Bruner Schaffer	United States Ambassador to Bangladesh; 1987–1990	Succeeded by William Milam
Preceded by Johnnie Carson	United States Ambassador to Mozambique; 1976–1980	Succeeded by David E. Simcox
