= Jody Rasch =

American artist

- Born: 1956 (age 69–70); New York City
- Education: University of Michigan B.S, New York University MBA, Purchase College Master of Fine Arts/Visual Arts
- Known for: Contemporary art

Jody Rasch (born in New York City in 1956) is a contemporary artist working in the art/sci movement. Rasch's work explores the modern world through the lens of science images. For example, Rasch uses images from electron microscopes to show the beauty of deadly diseases such as HIV and cancer cells. On the macro scale, Rasch uses images of galaxies, the cosmic background radiation to examine our place in the universe. On the sub-atomic level, Rasch uses images from particle accelerators. Generally, images of our galaxy and space are represented on a much smaller scale and images of the microscopic are represented in a much larger scale. He uses a variety of media that includes acrylic and oil paint, colored pencil and pen and ink to make his work.

Rasch's paintings are in the Embassy of the United States, Dhaka as part of the Art in Embassies Program. Rasch's work has been included in notable exhibitions such as "The World Unseen: Intersections of Art and Science" at the David J. Sencer CDC Museum in Atlanta, GA. In 2018, Rasch was in a two-person exhibition at the American Association for the Advancement of Science in Washington, DC. He is co-founder of Lamina Project, a curatorial project devoted to giving visibility to the art/sci movement.
