= Peter D. Haas =

American diplomat

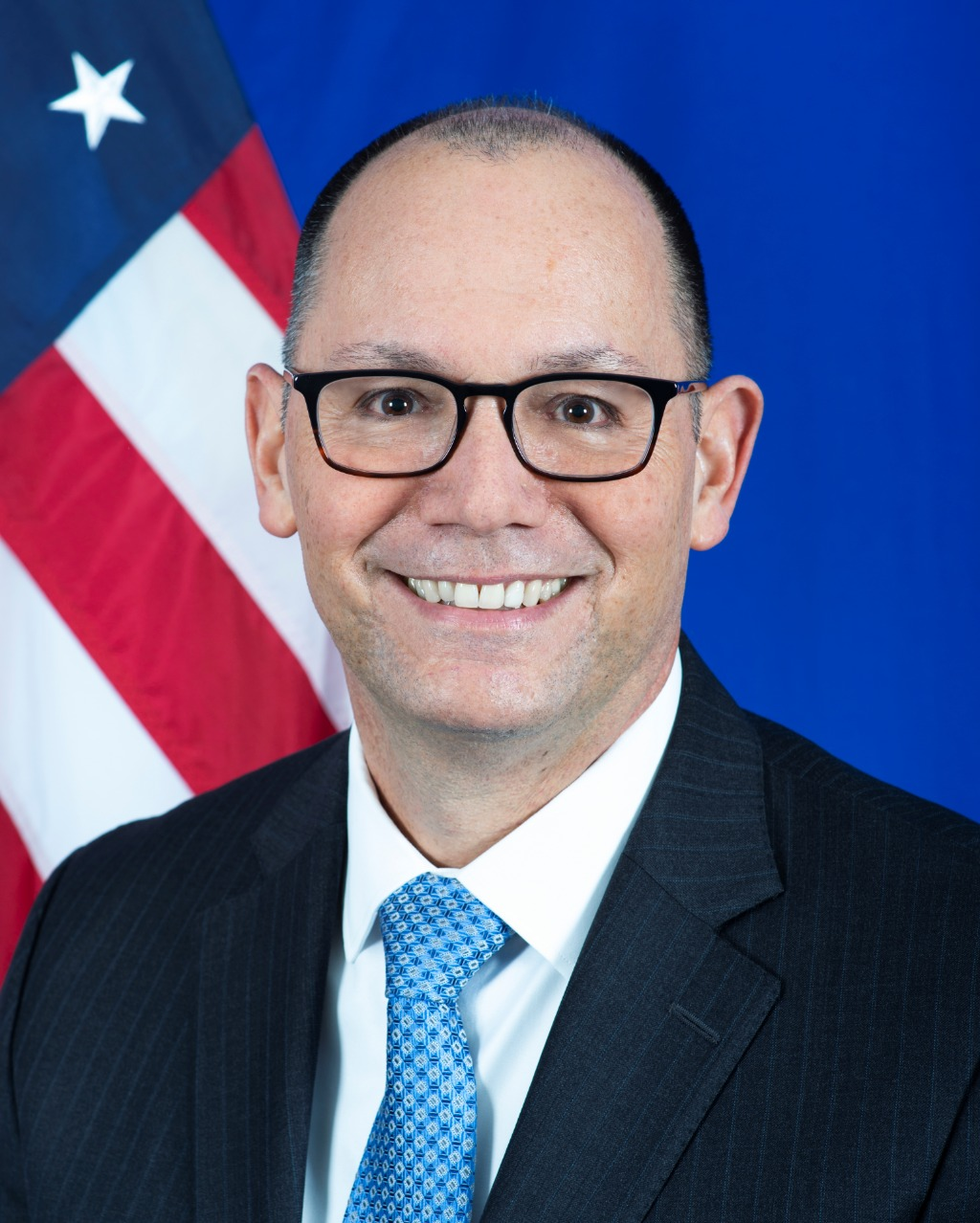
- Haas in 2022

United States Ambassador to Bangladesh
- In office March 15, 2022 – July 23, 2024
- President: Joe Biden
- Preceded by: Earl R. Miller
- Succeeded by: Brent T. Christensen

Assistant Secretary of State for Economic and Business Affairs
- Acting
- In office January 20, 2021 – August 27, 2021
- President: Joe Biden
- Preceded by: Manisha Singh
- Succeeded by: Matt Murray

Consul General of the United States, Mumbai
- In office 2011–2014

Personal details
- Education: Illinois Wesleyan University (BA); London School of Economics (MSc)

Peter David Haas is an American diplomat who served as the United States ambassador to Bangladesh from March 2022 to July 2024. Haas previously served as acting assistant secretary of state for economic and business affairs.

== Education ==
Haas earned a Bachelor of Arts degree in German and international studies from Illinois Wesleyan University in 1988 and a Master of Science in economics from the London School of Economics.

== Career ==
After joining the United States Foreign Service, Haas was first assigned to the U.S. embassy in Morocco as an economic officer. Haas also served as a desk officer for one year in the Foreign, Commonwealth and Development Office and was an economic officer in the Embassy of the United States, London. From 2011 to 2014, served as consul general of the United States, Mumbai. From 2014 to 2017, Haas worked for the United States mission to the OECD, including as acting permanent representative in 2017 and 2018. Haas then relocated to Washington, D.C., where he worked as acting deputy assistant secretary of state for trade policy and negotiations, deputy assistant secretary for trade policy and negotiations, and acting assistant secretary of state for economic and business affairs.

=== United States ambassador to Bangladesh ===
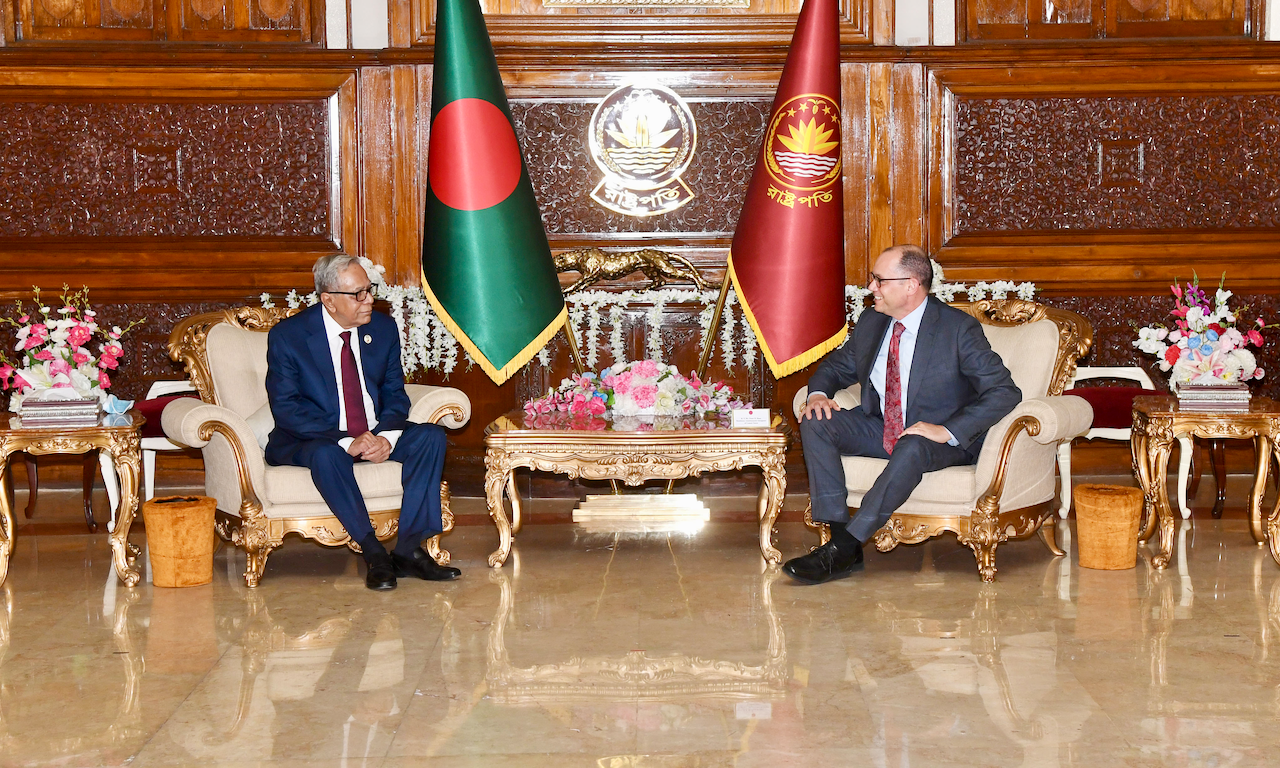
Credential Ceremony

On July 9, 2021, President Joe Biden nominated Haas to be the next United States Ambassador to Bangladesh. The Senate Foreign Relations Committee held hearings on his nomination on October 20, 2021. His nomination was favorably reported by the committee on November 3, 2021. Haas was confirmed by the United States Senate on December 18, 2021, via voice vote.

On March 15, 2022, he presented his credentials to the President of Bangladesh, Abdul Hamid. In December 2022, he had to cut short a visit to Maayer Daak, an advocacy group for victims of enforced disappearance, after pro-government mob tried to storm the venue. He oversaw the imposition of visa restrictions on Bangladeshi government officials and politicians in 2023 to ensure a fair general election in 2024. He had also warned that visa restrictions might be imposed on media personnel in Bangladesh. Haas and the United States call for fair election was not well received in India which supported Awami League government in Bangladesh led by Prime Minister Sheikh Hasina.

In July 2024, when the Bangladesh quota reform movement protests against the ruling Awami League government were ongoing, Haas resigned his post.

== Personal life ==
Haas speaks French and German.

Diplomatic posts
Preceded by Earl R. Miller	United States Ambassador to Bangladesh; 2022–2024	Succeeded by Brent T. Christensen
