= Howard Bruner Schaffer =

American professor and diplomat

United States Ambassador to Bangladesh
- In office August 13, 1984 – July 9, 1987
- President: Ronald Reagan
- Preceded by: Jane Abell Coon
- Succeeded by: Willard Ames De Pree

Personal details
- Born: July 21, 1929 New York City, U.S.
- Died: November 17, 2017 (aged 88)
- Education: Columbia University

Howard Bruner Schaffer (July 21, 1929 – November 17, 2017) was an American professor and diplomat. A Foreign Service Officer, he served as the U.S. ambassador to Bangladesh from 1984 to 1987.

== Family and education ==
Howard Bruner Schaffer was born on July 21, 1929, in New York City. He had a sister, Doris Schaffer O'Brien, and was married to Teresita Currie Schaffer. He completed his BA. at Harvard University in 1950. Between 1953 and 1955 he attended Columbia University.

== Career ==
From 1951 to 1953, Schaffer served in the U.S. Army. From 1969 to 1970, he was a scholar at Princeton University and was also an administrator and professor at Georgetown University's Institute for the Study of Diplomacy. Subsequently, he had a career of thirty-six years in the Foreign service, dealing mainly with America's relations with the South Asia region. His early postings were in New Delhi, Seoul and Kuala Lumpur. He served as political counselor to the American embassies in Pakistan between 1974-1977 and also served as political counselor to the American embassy in India during 1977–1979. He then held the post of U.S. Ambassador to Bangladesh during 1984–1987. Schaffer was twice Deputy Assistant Secretary for Near Eastern and South Asian Affairs in the US State Department.

== Works ==
- Chester Bowles: New Dealer in Cold War
- Ellsworth Bunker: Global Troubleshooter, Vietnam Hawk
- The Limits of Influence: American Role in Kashmir
- How Pakistan negotiates with the United States: Riding the Roller Coaster

Besides books, Schaffer has also authored several articles on matters related to South Asia.

=== The Limits of Influence: America's Role in Kashmir ===
Robert Hathaway notes in Foreign Affairs that Schaffer has written an "exemplary account" of the United States' efforts to settle or at least manage the Kashmir Conflict. Hathaway observes that Schaffer argues that the time is right for a fresh US initiative to help resolve the Kashmir Conflict.

Surinder Mohan of the Jawaharlal Nehru University notes that it is a "remarkable" book which traces the Oval Office's efforts to resolve the Kashmir issue right from the beginning. He observes that the book follows a framework highlighting America's intermittently active and inactive participation from 1948 to the mid-1960s. Mohan observes that the book describes well the failure of all the parties involved: the United Nations, United States, India and Pakistan. While maintaining that it is a fine book Mohan expresses disappointment with the absence of the analysis of the impacts of the 1971 war and Indo-US nuclear deal. Mohan concludes that the book is timely, devoid of jargon and highly accessible. Mohan notes that the book contributes substantially to the literature on the Kashmir conflict and Mohan also recommends that the book be on the desk of every policy-maker and student of the region.

Michael Cotter terms Schaffer's book as outstanding and says it is a must read for those studying the Kashmir Conflict as well as the current Central Asian conflicts. Cotter observes that while the book concentrates on America's role it also provides a detailed outline of the conflict from its genesis to its contemporary geopolitical impact. According to Cotter, Schaffer is one of the few who can cover the topic thoroughly. Cotter notes that Schaffer's detailed analysis is buttressed with extensive footnotes which take heavily from the official documents from the dispute's early days. Cotter in his conclusion remarks that there is "unlikely to be a better textbook example of such a situation than that offered to readers by Howard Schaffer.

=== Chester Bowles: New Dealer in the Cold War ===
According to John M. Carroll, of Lamar University, Schaffer has written a "splendid diplomatic biography" of Chester Bowles. Carroll notes that Schaffer assesses Bowler's diplomatic ideas by "carefully examining" his role as American ambassador to India and as Kennedy's undersecretary of state. Carroll observes that one of the many strengths of the book is Schaffer's critical approach to Bowles. Carroll concludes that Schaffer has made an" enlightening analysis."

Gary R Hess, of Bowling Green State University, notes that despite being sympathetic to Bowles, Schaffer has been able to see his flaws. Hess concludes that Schaffer "deserves high praise for this carefully crafted and thoughtful portrait of Bowles."

Arlene Lazarowitz, of California State University, states that Bowles career in India was "rightfully an integral part of Howard B. Schaffer's biography." Lazarowitz notes that Schaffer's extensive research reflects Bowles voluminous books, speeches, correspondence and personal knowledge based on Schaffer's experience.

Arthur Schlesinger, of the City University of New York, terms Schaffer's book as an "admirable account" of Bowles career in foreign affairs. Schlesinger opines that "In any event, we may be grateful to Schaffer for a just and valuable book."

William Allison, of Bowling Green State University, describes Schaffer's book as "admirable" and further states that Schaffer deserves praise for his biography while Bowles needs examination. Allison notes Bowles popularity with the Indians while he was America's ambassador to India. According to Allison, since Schaffer worked under Bowles in New Delhi, he knew of his works and methods.

Sumit Ganguly notes that Schaffer's book is skilfully written and carefully researched. Ganguly describes Schaffer's account of Bowles as "succinct".

== Death ==
Schaffer died on November 17, 2017, at the age of 88. Richard Rossow, senior fellow and chairholder of Wadhwani Chair in US-India policy studies at the Center for Strategic and International Studies confirmed the news on Twitter and called Schaffer a "giant" of US-India relations whose wise counsel and humour would be "missed."
