= David T. Schneider =

American diplomat (1922–2014)

David Taylor Schneider

U.S. Ambassador to Bangladesh
- In office 8 November 1977 – 25 July 1981
- President: Jimmy Carter
- Preceded by: Edward E. Masters
- Succeeded by: Jane Abell Coon

Personal details
- Born: November 20, 1922 Cincinnati, Ohio, U.S.
- Died: September 24, 2014 (aged 91)

Military service
- Allegiance: United States
- Branch/service: United States Army
- Years of service: 1943-1945
- Unit: United States Army Air Force
- Battles/wars: World War II

David T. Schneider (November 20, 1922 – September 24, 2014) was an American diplomat who served in India, Pakistan and Eritrea and served as the ambassador to Bangladesh.

== Early life ==
Schneider was born on 20 November 1922 in Cincinnati, Ohio. In 1947 he completed his B.A. from Yale University. From 1943 to 1945 he served in the United States Army Air Force.

== Career ==
Schneider worked at the Federal Security Agency from 1947 to 1949. In 1949 he joined the United States Air Force as an Intelligence analyst. He worked in Karachi, Pakistan as a consular, security, and administrative officer from 1950 to 1953. He worked as a consular officer in Asmara, Eritrea from 1953 to 1955. He learned Hindi. He was the political officer of the United States consulate in Bombay, India from 1956 to 1958. He worked as the head of the political section in the United States Embassy in Delhi, India. He worked at the State Department as the officer in charge of the India, Sri Lanka, and Nepal section from 1962 to 1966. From 1966 to 1967 he studied at the National War College. In 1967 he joined the United States mission in Rawalpindi, Pakistan as deputy chief of mission and left in 1968. From 1968 to 1969 he worked in the office of Space Environmental Science Affairs at the State Department. In 1969 he was appointed the country director of India in the State Department. In 1973 he became the deputy chief of mission in India and was stationed at the United States embassy in Delhi. He was appointed the United States ambassador to Bangladesh on 8 November 1977 by President Jimmy Carter. In 1983 he met Rifaat al-Assad, brother of Syrian President Hafez al-Assad, in Washington, D.C. Schneider was the deputy assistant secretary of state for Near Eastern affairs at the State Department.

== Death ==
Schneider died on 24 September 2014, at the age of 91.

Diplomatic posts
Preceded by Edward E. Masters	United States Ambassador to Bangladesh; 1977–1981	Succeeded by Jane Abell Coon
