= Brent T. Christensen =

American diplomat

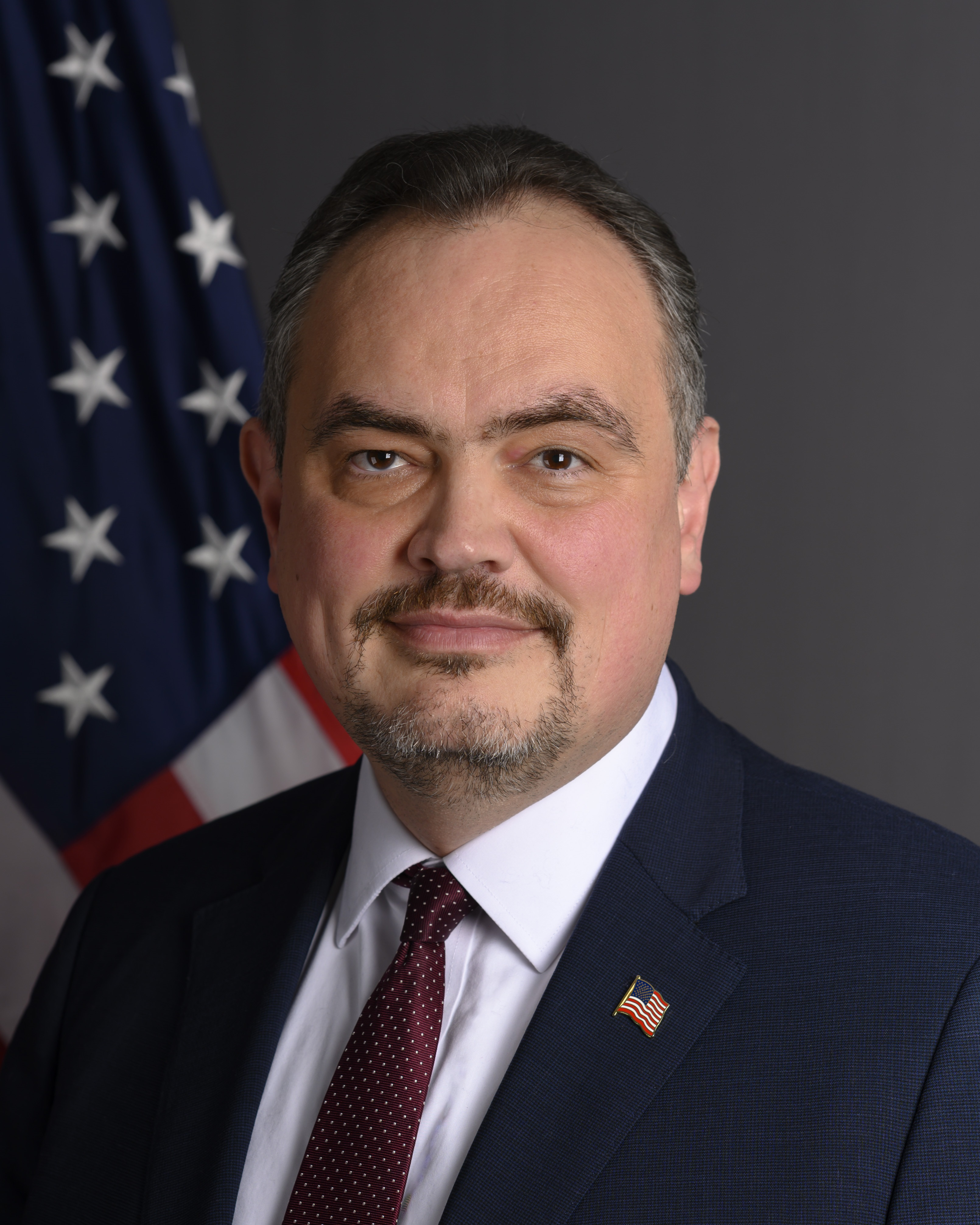
- Official portrait, 2025

United States Ambassador to Bangladesh
- Incumbent
- Assumed office January 15, 2026
- Appointed by: Donald Trump
- Preceded by: Peter D. Haas

Personal details
- Education: Rice University (BA); Texas A&M University (MS); National War College (MS)
- Occupation: Diplomat

Brent T. Christensen is an American diplomat who has been serving as the United States ambassador to Bangladesh since January 2026. Christensen previously served as the senior official performing the duties of under secretary for arms control and international security.

== Education and early career ==
Christensen earned a Bachelor of Arts in Economics and Managerial Studies from Rice University. He went on to receive a Master of Science in Statistics from Texas A&M University. In 2022, he earned a Master of Science in National Security Strategy from the National War College.

Before joining the Foreign Service, Christensen worked as a management consultant in Houston and New York City.

== Career ==
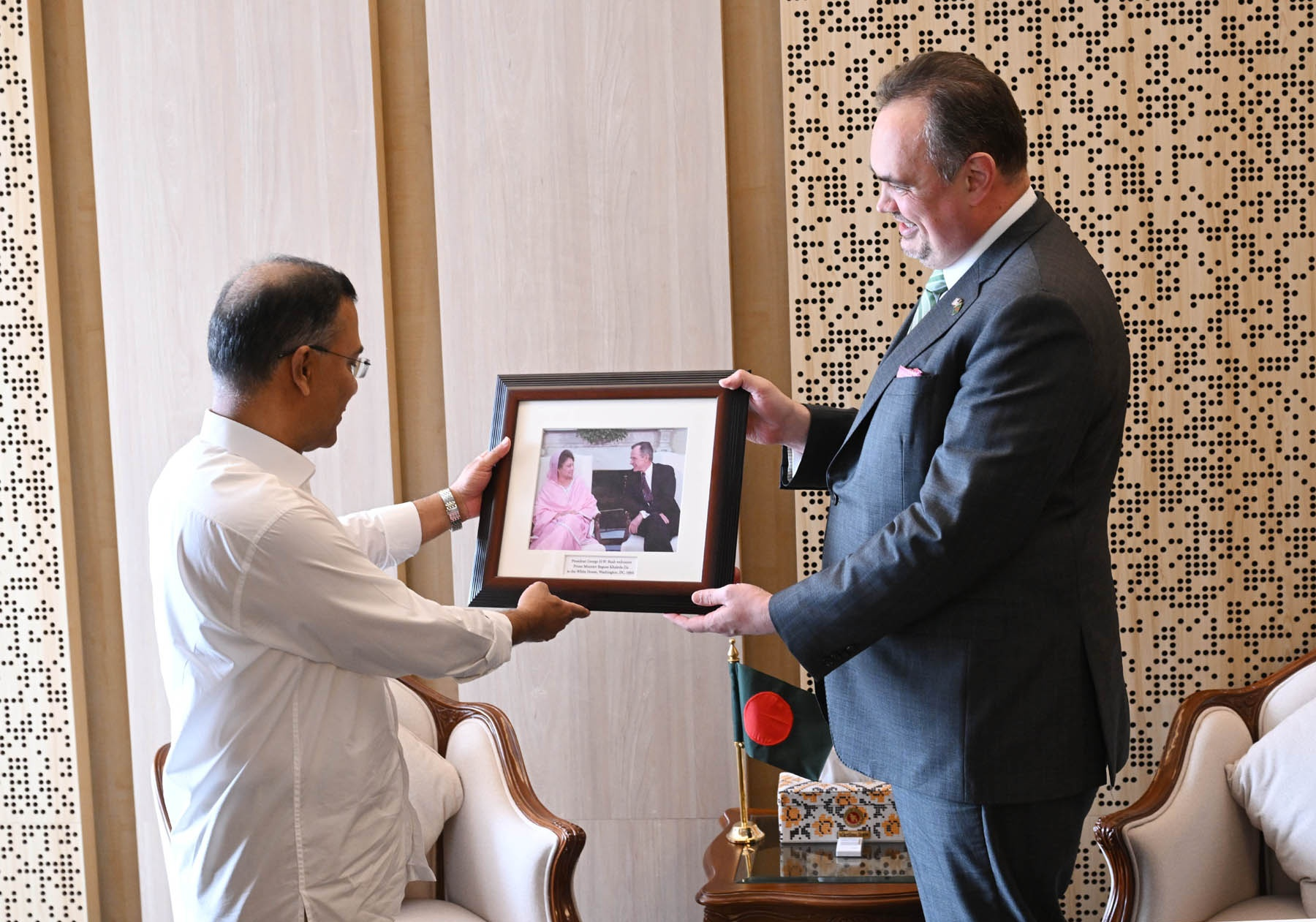
Christensen presenting a gift to Bangladeshi PM Tarique Rahman

Christensen joined the United States Foreign Service in 2002. From 2016 to 2019, Christensen served as the deputy director of the Office of Regional Security and Arms Transfers within the Bureau of Political-Military Affairs. From 2019 to 2021, he served as counselor for political and economic affairs at the U.S. Embassy in Dhaka, Bangladesh. From August 2022 to January 2025, Christensen served as the foreign policy advisor to the commander of United States Strategic Command.

On January 20, 2025, President Donald Trump designated Christensen as the senior official performing the duties of under secretary for arms control and international security.

=== United States ambassador to Bangladesh ===
On September 2, 2025, President Donald Trump nominated Christensen to be the next United States ambassador to Bangladesh. The Senate Foreign Relations Committee held hearings on his nomination on October 23, 2025. His nomination was favorably reported by the committee on November 20, 2025. Christensen was confirmed by the United States Senate on December 18, 2025, via voice vote. On January 10, 2026, he was sworn in as the ambassador. He arrived in Bangladesh on January 12, 2026. He presented his credentials to President Mohammed Shahabuddin on January 15, 2026.

== Personal life ==
Christensen speaks Spanish, German, and Vietnamese. He has also studied French, Japanese, and Portuguese.

Diplomatic posts
Preceded by Peter D. Haas	United States Ambassador to Bangladesh; 2026–present	Incumbent
