= Edward E. Masters =

American diplomat (1924–2014)

U.S. Ambassador to Indonesia
- In office November 3, 1977 – November 10, 1981
- President: Jimmy Carter
- Preceded by: David D. Newsom
- Succeeded by: John Herbert Holdridge

U.S. Ambassador to Bangladesh
- In office October 5, 1976 – November 27, 1977
- President: Gerald Ford
- Preceded by: Davis Eugene Boster
- Succeeded by: David T. Schneider

Personal details
- Born: June 21, 1924 Columbus, Ohio, U.S.
- Died: March 21, 2014 (aged 89) Washington D.C., U.S.

Edward E. Masters (June 21, 1924 – March 21, 2014) was an American diplomat.

== Early life ==
Masters was born on June 21, 1924, in Columbus, Ohio, United States. He graduated from high school in 1942. He joined Denison University but left soon to join the army. He served in the army for three years. He completed his undergraduate from George Washington University in 1948 and in 1949 he completed his master's degree from Fletcher School of Law and Diplomacy.

== Career ==
Masters served as an intelligent analyst in the State Department from 1949 to 1950. From 1950 to 1952 he was the resident officer and later military liaison officer in Frankfurt, West Germany. From 1953 to 1954 he was the political officer of the US embassy in Karachi, Pakistan. From 1955 to 1958 was the political officer in Madras, India. He was an intelligence specialist from 1958 to 1960 in the State Department.

Masters served as the chief intelligence officer of Indonesia-Malaya branch of the Intelligence Research Analysis branch Asia from 1960 to 1962. He was the head of the Thailand affairs at the State Department from 1962 to 1963. Masters was accused of aiding and abetting the Indonesian mass killings of 1965–66 by systematically supplying lists of members of the Communist Party of Indonesia to death squads. He later served as the deputy chief of the United States embassy in Thailand from 1971 to 1975.

Masters was appointed the ambassador of the United States to Bangladesh on October 4, 1976. He left the post on November 27, 1977. He was appointed ambassador to Indonesia on November 3, 1977. he served there until November 10, 1981. He visited East Timor on September 14, 1977, after the Indonesian invasion. He was the founding president of United States-Indonesia society, a post he held from 1994 to 2001.

== Personal life and death ==
Masters was married to Allene Masters. He died at his home in Washington, D.C. on March 21, 2014, at the age of 89.

Diplomatic posts
Preceded by Davis Eugene Boster	United States Ambassador to Bangladesh; 1976–1977	Succeeded by David T. Schneider
Preceded by David D. Newsom	United States Ambassador to Indonesia; 1977–1981	Succeeded by John Herbert Holdridge
