= David Nathan Merrill =

American diplomat (born 1943)

United States Ambassador to Bangladesh
- In office February 11, 1994 – May 14, 1997
- President: Bill Clinton
- Preceded by: William Milam
- Succeeded by: John C. Holzman

Personal details
- Born: 1943 (age 82–83)
- Education: Brandeis University; Tufts University; Harvard University

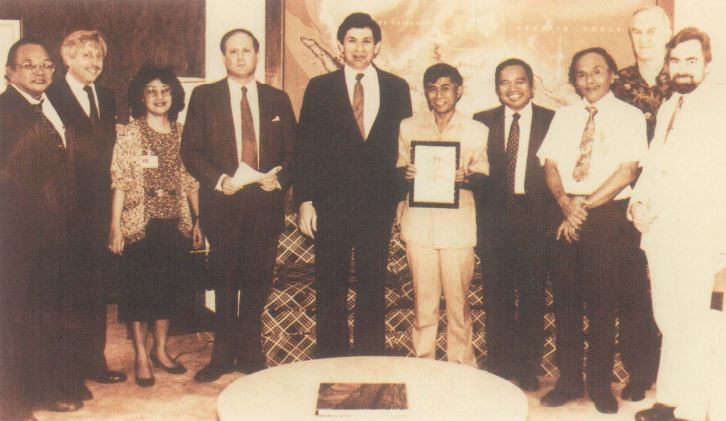
Merrill (fourth from left) while serving as USAID Mission Director with U.S. Ambassador to indonesia Paul Wolfowitz (fifth from left) and others

David Nathan Merrill (born 1943) is an American retired diplomat who served as the ambassador of the United States to Bangladesh.

== Early life ==
Merrill was born in 1943. He earned a B.A. from Brandeis University, before completing his master's degree in international affairs from the Fletcher School of Law and Diplomacy at Tufts University. He completed a master's degree in public affairs in Asian economic development at the John F. Kennedy School of Government of Harvard University. He is married to Irrum Mehmood Merrill.

== Career ==
Merrill served as the USAID Mission Director in Indonesia from 1986 to 1989. In 1992 he was made a career minister in USAID, the highest position in the organization. He served as the USAID Representative to Burma. He served as the Ambassador Extraordinary and Plenipotentiary of the United States of America to the People's Republic of Bangladesh. He was appointed ambassador on February 11, 1994. He presented his credentials to the President of Bangladesh on April 5, 1994, and served until May 14, 1997. Before that he was the acting assistant administrator of USAID Europe at the State Department.

Merrill served during the first peaceful democratic handover of government in Bangladesh. He received both the President's Meritorious Honor Award and the State Department's Superior Honor Award. He was also awarded the USAID's Distinguished Honor Award. After retiring from the State Department he worked as a consultant for energy companies in Asia. He is the president of the non-profit U.S.-Indonesia Society (USINDO) which works to encourage educational and legislative exchange between the United States and Indonesia.

Diplomatic posts
Preceded by William Milam	United States Ambassador to Bangladesh; 1994–1997	Succeeded by John C. Holzman
