= Mary Ann Peters =

American career diplomat (born 1951)

United States Ambassador to Bangladesh
- In office September 15, 2000 – June 19, 2003
- President: Bill Clinton; George W. Bush
- Preceded by: John C. Holzman
- Succeeded by: Harry K. Thomas, Jr.

Personal details
- Born: 1951 (age 74–75) California, U.S.
- Education: Santa Clara University; Johns Hopkins School of Advanced International Studies; Institut d’Etudes Politiques

Mary Ann Peters (born 1951) is an American career diplomat and a former chief executive officer of the Carter Center. A member of the U.S. Department of State for nearly 30 years, Peters served in a variety of postings before becoming a National Security Council staffer (1995-1997) and United States Ambassador to Bangladesh (2000-2003). After leaving the foreign service, Peters became the provost of the United States Naval War College in 2008. She became the CEO of the Carter Center in 2014.

== Early life and education ==
Peters was born in Rhode Island. She holds a Bachelor of Arts degree from Santa Clara University and a Master's in international studies from the Johns Hopkins School of Advanced International Studies. Her formal education also included courses at the Institut d’Etudes Politiques in Paris through IES Abroad.

== Diplomatic career ==
Peters spent more than 30 years as a career diplomat with the U.S. Department of State. She began her career as a vice-consul in Frankfurt, Germany in 1975. A senior diplomat, fluent in six foreign languages, Ambassador Peters has also served in Sofia, Bulgaria, as deputy chief of mission; in Moscow as economic counselor; and in Mandalay as principal officer.

From 1988 to 1990, Peters was the deputy director of the Office of Pakistan, Afghanistan and Bangladesh Affairs in the State Department.

From 1993 to 1994, Peters served as deputy assistant secretary of state with oversight responsibility for U.S. relations with 19 Western European countries and Canada. In this capacity she acted as the U.S. chair of the U.S. – Canada military coordination body, the Permanent Joint Board on Defense.

From 1995 to 1997, Peters served in the White House as Director for European and Canadian Affairs at the National Security Council. Among other portfolios in this position, Ambassador Peters worked on the diplomatic and security aspects of the search for peace in Northern Ireland. Between 1997 and 2000, she was the deputy chief of mission at the United States Embassy in Ottawa, Ontario, Canada, responsible for the management of the embassy and supervision of the six U.S. consulates general in Canada.

From 2000 to 2003, Peters served as the United States Ambassador to Bangladesh, leading the mission's efforts in support of the war on terrorism and other key U.S. foreign policy goals. She received a Presidential Meritorious Service Award in 2003 for her work in Bangladesh.

== Career after the Foreign Service ==
Peters served as associate director for international liaison in the College of International and Security Studies at the George C. Marshall European Center for Security Studies in Garmisch-Partenkirchen, then became dean of academics at that institution until being appointed to the Naval War College in 2008.

Peters became the CEO of the Carter Center on September 2, 2014. In that post, she oversees all of the center's programs and operations.

== Memberships and personal life ==
Peters is a member of the Council on Foreign Relations and Women in International Security.

Peters is married to Timothy McMahon, a teacher. They have two children.

Diplomatic posts
Preceded by John C. Holzman	United States Ambassador to Bangladesh; 2000–2003	Succeeded by Harry K. Thomas Jr.
