= William Milam =

American diplomat (1936–2026)

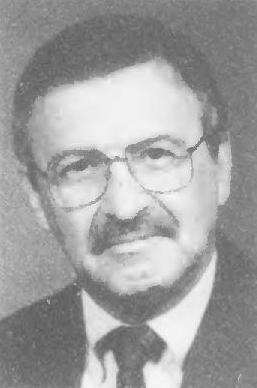

United States Ambassador to Bangladesh
- In office June 27, 1990 – October 9, 1993
- President: George H. W. Bush
- Preceded by: Willard Ames De Pree
- Succeeded by: David Nathan Merrill

United States Ambassador to Pakistan
- In office August 3, 1998 – July 6, 2001
- President: Bill Clinton
- Preceded by: Thomas W. Simons
- Succeeded by: Wendy Jean Chamberlin

Personal details
- Born: July 24, 1936 Bisbee, Arizona, U.S.
- Died: February 17, 2026 (aged 89) Sacramento, California, U.S.
- Education: Stanford University; University of Michigan

William Bryant Milam (July 24, 1936 – February 17, 2026) was an American diplomat who was Senior Policy Scholar at the Woodrow Wilson International Center for Scholars in Washington, D.C.

== Early life and education ==
Born in Bisbee, Arizona, Milam grew up in Sacramento, California and resided in Washington, D.C. He received an A.B. from Stanford University and an M.A. in economics from the University of Michigan.

== Foreign service career ==
Milam was a career diplomat entering the foreign service in 1962. He retired from the United States Foreign Service at the end of July 2001 but was recalled after September 11, and spent nine months helping to set up the multilateral mechanism for the reconstruction of Afghanistan. He was also recalled to serve as interim Charge d'Affaires at the United States Embassy in Tripoli, Libya, prior to the re-establishment of a permanent American ambassadorial post to Libya. His last post before retirement was as Ambassador to the Islamic Republic of Pakistan where he served from August 1998 to July 2001.

He served as U.S. Chief of Mission in Liberia from November 8, 1995 to August 23, 1998. During his tenure in Liberia, the seven-year civil war was brought to an end, free and transparent elections held, and a new democratically elected government took office. He was U.S. Ambassador to Bangladesh from August 1990 to October 1993, and during that time witnessed the great strides that country made toward more complete democratization. From November 1993 to September 1995 he was U.S. Special Negotiator for Environmental and Scientific Affairs at the Department of State. In that capacity, he led the U.S. delegation that negotiated the 1994 Desertification Treaty.

Prior to his appointment to Bangladesh, Ambassador Milam was Deputy Assistant Secretary of State for International Finance and Development with responsibility for international finance and development issues, including debt and investment, as well as intellectual property protection. He represented the United States at the Paris Club, the international forum for rescheduling official debt.

In his earlier diplomatic career, Milam served in Martinique, French West Indies; a previous tour in Liberia; in London, and in Yaoundé, Cameroon. His earlier Washington assignments included African affairs, international finance, and international energy policy. From the Department of State, Ambassador Milam received the James Clement Dunn Award, as the outstanding Class I officer (1981) and a Superior Honor Award (1983). He received a Presidential Meritorious Service Award (1990) and a Presidential Award for Outstanding Service (1991).

Milam also wrote monthly op-ed columns for Pakistan's Daily Times newspaper. Milam was editor of South Asia Perspectives, whose editor at large is Jon F. Danilowicz and Mushfiqul Fazal Ansarey.

== Death ==
Milam died on February 17, 2026, at the age of 89.

== Works ==
- Bangladesh and Pakistan: Flirting with Failure in South Asia. Columbia University Press. 2009. ISBN 9780231700665.;
- "Bangladesh and the Burdens of History," Current History, April 2007, vol. 106, No. 699, pp 153–160;
- "Liberia", Political Finance in Post-Conflict Societies, Center for Transitional and Post-Conflict Governance, USAID, May 2006.

Diplomatic posts
Preceded by Willard Ames De Pree	United States Ambassador to Bangladesh; 1990–1993	Succeeded by David Nathan Merrill
Preceded by Thomas W. Simons Jr.	United States Ambassador to Pakistan; 1998–2001	Succeeded by Wendy Chamberlin
