= Joseph R. Donovan Jr. =

American diplomat

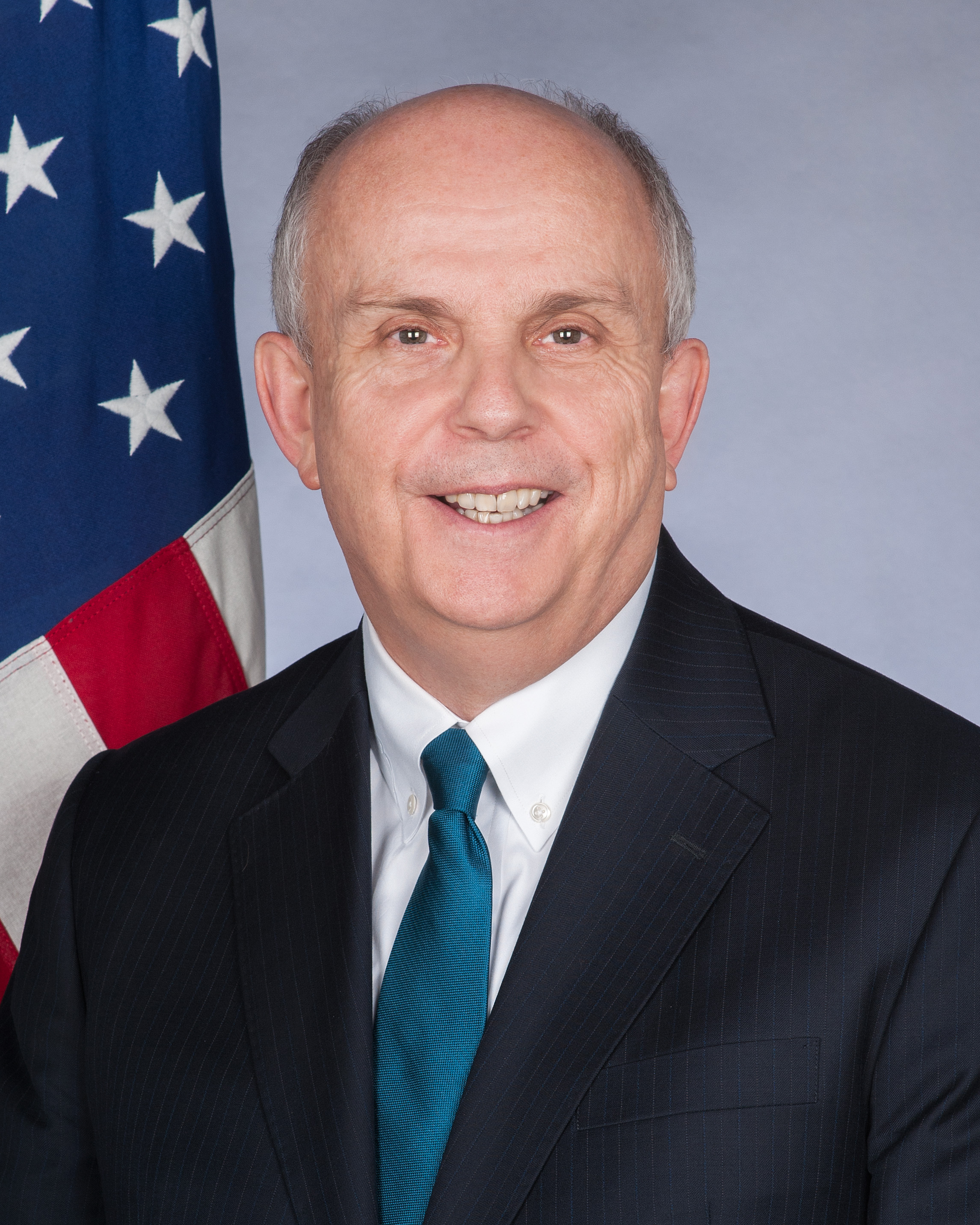

United States Ambassador to Indonesia
- In office January 12, 2017 – February 14, 2020
- President: Barack Obama; Donald Trump
- Preceded by: Robert O. Blake Jr.
- Succeeded by: Sung Kim

Personal details
- Education: Georgetown University's School of Foreign Service; Naval Postgraduate School

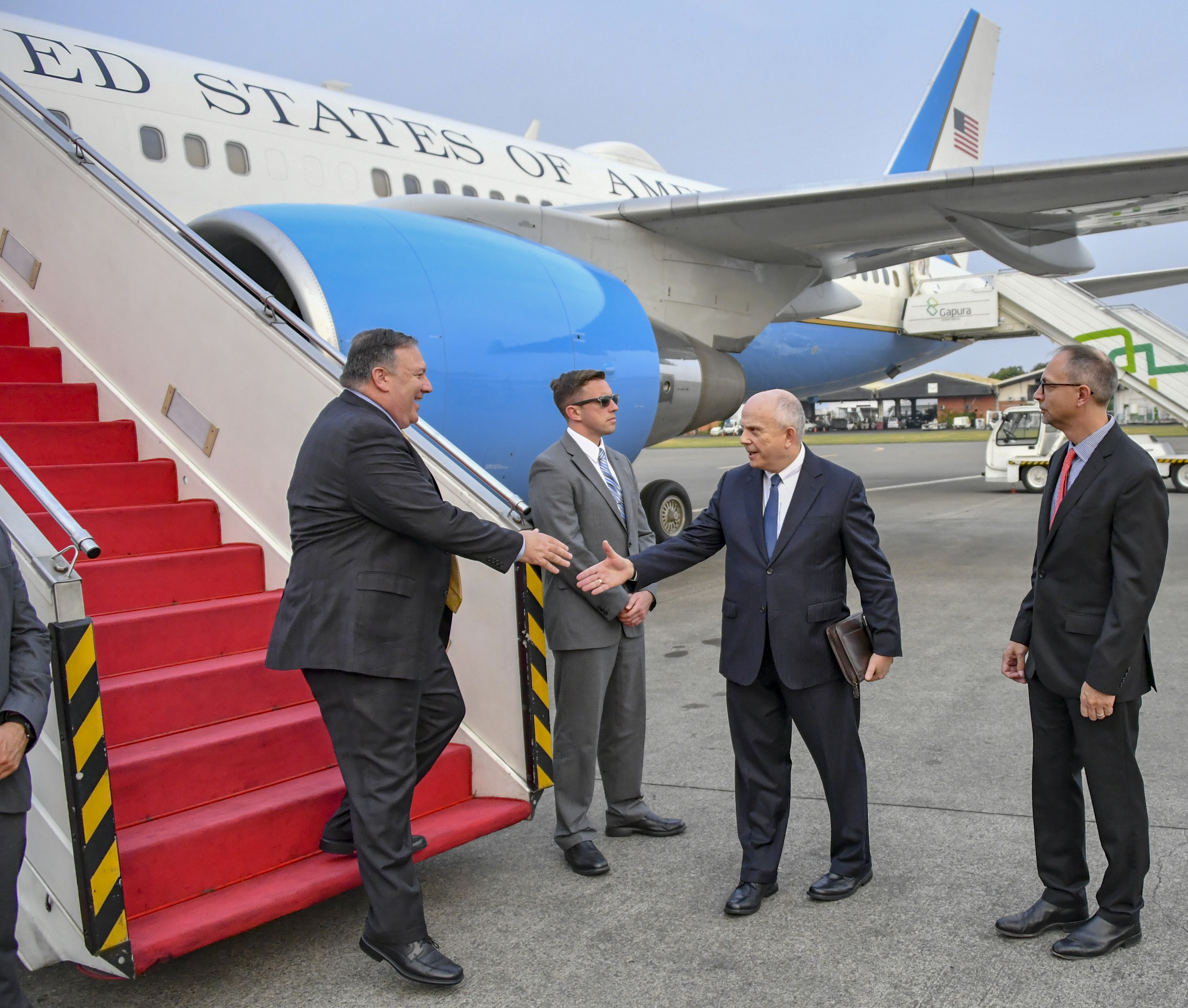
Donovan greets Secretary of State Pompeo in Jakarta in 2018

Joseph R. Donovan Jr. is a former American diplomat who previously served as United States Ambassador to Indonesia. Joseph R. Donovan Jr. graduated from Georgetown University's School of Foreign Service. He earned a master's degree from the Naval Postgraduate School.

== Career ==
Donovan began his career as a Peace Corps volunteer in Seoul, South Korea, and he subsequently joined the United States Foreign Service, serving in Qatar. He was the Branch Chief of the Kaohsiung Branch Office, American Institute in Taiwan from 1989 to 1992, the Director of the USDS's Office of Chinese and Mongolian Affairs from 2003 to 2005, Deputy Chief of Mission at the Embassy of the United States, Tokyo from 2005 to 2008, and the Consul General in Hong Kong from 2008 to 2009. He was the Principal Deputy Assistant Secretary in the USDS's Bureau of East Asian and Pacific Affairs from 2009 to 2011, Associate Professor at the National Defense University from 2011 to 2012, and Foreign Policy Advisor to the Chairman of the Joint Chiefs of Staff from 2012 to 2014. He was the managing director of the Washington, D.C. office of the American Institute in Taiwan from 2014 to 2016.

Donovan presented his credentials as the United States Ambassador to Indonesia on January 12, 2017, and served until February 14, 2020.

== Honours ==
- Order of the Rising Sun, 3rd Class, Gold Rays with Neck Ribbon (2026)

Diplomatic posts
Preceded by Robert O. Blake Jr.	United States Ambassador to Indonesia; 2017–2020	Succeeded by Sung Kim
