= Robert O. Blake Jr. =

American diplomat

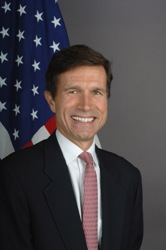

United States Ambassador to Indonesia
- In office January 30, 2014 – July 19, 2016
- President: Barack Obama
- Preceded by: Scot Marciel
- Succeeded by: Joseph R. Donovan Jr.

5th Assistant Secretary of State for South and Central Asian Affairs
- In office May 26, 2009 – October 18, 2013
- President: Barack Obama
- Preceded by: Richard Boucher
- Succeeded by: Nisha Biswal

United States Ambassador to the Maldives
- In office October 30, 2006 – May 21, 2009
- President: George W. Bush; Barack Obama
- Preceded by: Jeffrey Lunstead
- Succeeded by: Patricia Butenis

United States Ambassador to Sri Lanka
- In office September 9, 2006 – May 21, 2009
- President: George W. Bush; Barack Obama
- Preceded by: Jeffrey Lunstead
- Succeeded by: Patricia Butenis

Personal details
- Born: Robert Orris Blake Jr. 1957 (age 68–69) U.S.
- Parent(s): Robert O. Blake; Sylvia Whitehouse Blake
- Relatives: Sheldon Whitehouse (cousin); Charles S. Whitehouse (uncle); Sheldon Whitehouse (diplomat) (grandfather)
- Education: Harvard University; Johns Hopkins University

Robert Orris Blake Jr. (born 1957) is an American career diplomat who served as Ambassador to Sri Lanka and the Maldives from 2006 to 2009, Assistant Secretary of State for South and Central Asian Affairs from 2009 to 2013 and Ambassador to Indonesia from 2014 to 2016.

Blake is a Senior Director at McLarty Associates where he leads the firm's India and South Asia practice and advises clients in Indonesia for the Southeast Asia and Pacific practice. He is also co-chair of the board of trustees at the U.S.-Indonesia Society (USINDO) and is a board member at the Asia Foundation and the Bhutan Foundation. Blake also serves on the Global Leadership Council for the World Resources Institute and the Natural Resources Defense Council (NRDC).

He is the son of Robert O. Blake and grandson of Sheldon Whitehouse, both former U.S. Ambassadors.

== Diplomatic career ==
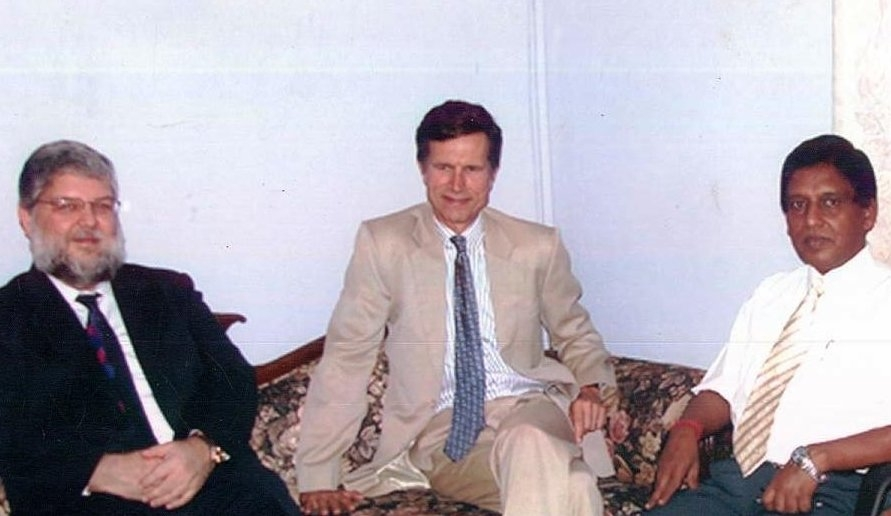
Blake is seen with E. Saravanapavan at Uthayan Office in Jaffna.

Blake is a career Foreign Service Officer, having entered the Foreign Service in 1985. He has served at the U.S. embassies in Tunisia, Algeria, Nigeria and Egypt. He also has held a number of positions at the State Department in Washington, D.C. Blake served as Deputy Chief of Mission at the U.S. Mission in New Delhi, India, from 2003 to 2006 where he was named the worldwide DCM of the Year by the State Department.

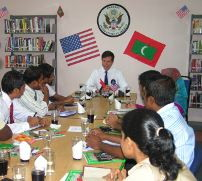
Blake in November 2007

Blake arrived in Sri Lanka on September 8, 2006, to take up his duties as Ambassador to the Democratic Socialist Republic of Sri Lanka and the Republic of Maldives. Blake presented his credentials on September 9 to Sri Lankan President Mahinda Rajapaksa. In January 2007 he met with President Maumoon Abdul Gayoom to discuss renewable energy in the Maldives. In February 2007, Blake received minor injuries from a mortar blast while exiting a helicopter at a Sri Lankan air base in Batticaloa, where he was to attend a development meeting. Tamil rebels are believed to be responsible for the mortar attack. The Tigers claimed they were not informed by the government that the ambassador was present and were only returning fire from the Sri Lankan Army.

Blake was known to be engaged in the Sri Lankan civil society and practice what came to be known as "Public Diplomacy" which led some to label him as an interferer in internal affairs of the country.

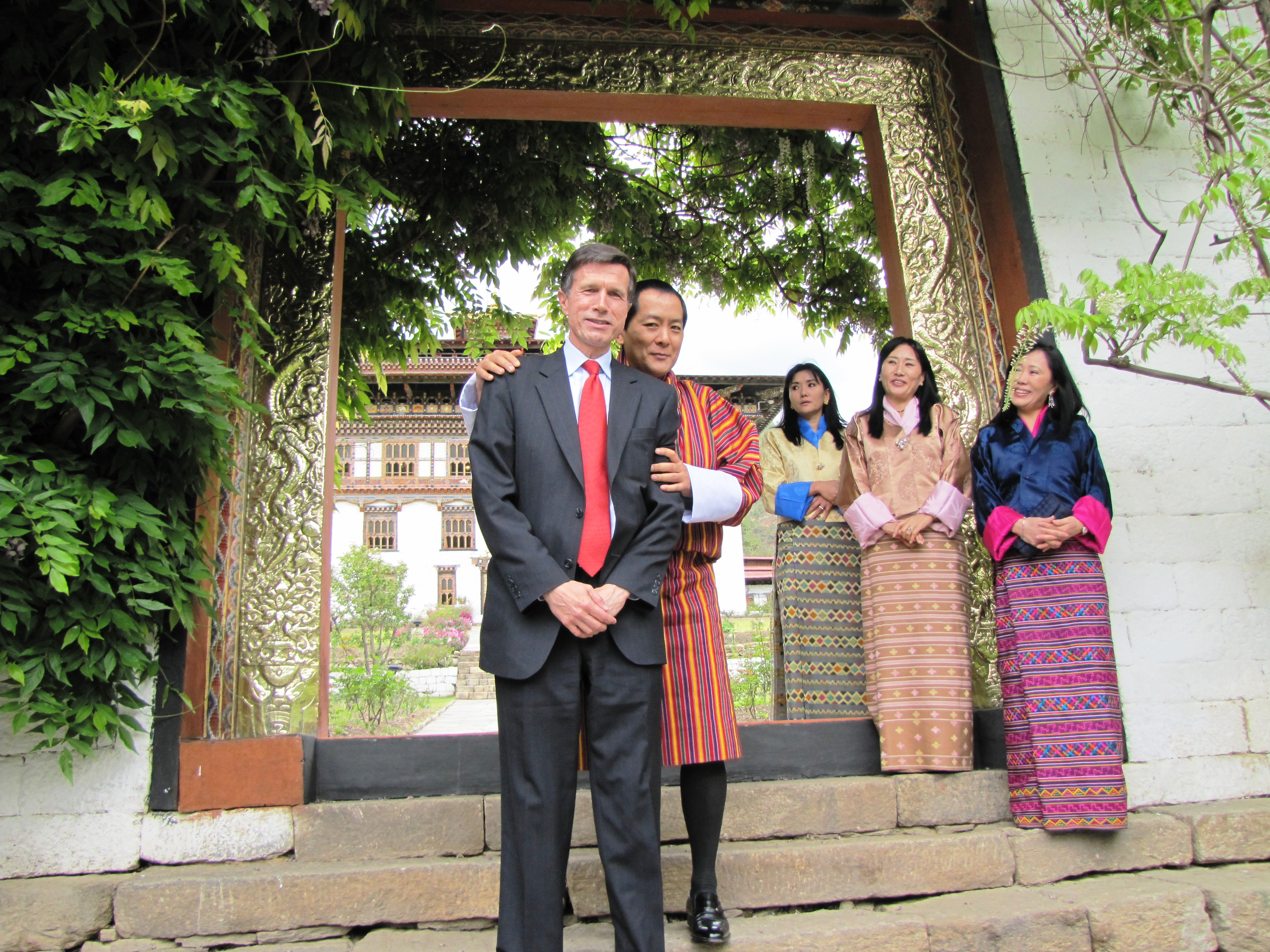
Blake with Jigme Singye Wangchuck and his three wives, 2010

Blake succeeded Richard Boucher when he assumed his duties as the Assistant Secretary for Bureau of South and Central Asian Affairs on May 26, 2009, for which he was awarded the State Department's Distinguished Service Award. He was replaced by Nisha Desai Biswal on October 23, 2013, after being nominated by President Obama to serve as U.S. Ambassador to Indonesia.

== Personal life ==
Blake earned a B.A. from Harvard College in 1980 and an M.A. in international relations from Johns Hopkins University's School of Advanced International Studies (SAIS) in 1984. He is married to Sofia Blake. They have three daughters.

== Sources ==
- Embassy of the United States in Colombo: Biography of the ambassador

Diplomatic posts
Preceded by Jeffrey Lunstead	United States Ambassador to Sri Lanka; 2006–2009	Succeeded by Patricia Butenis
Preceded by Jeffrey Lunstead	United States Ambassador to the Maldives; 2006–2009	Succeeded by Patricia Butenis
Preceded by Scot Marciel	United States Ambassador to Indonesia; 2014–2016	Succeeded by Joseph R. Donovan Jr.
Political offices
Preceded by Richard Boucher	Assistant Secretary of State for South and Central Asian Affairs; 2009–2013	Succeeded by Nisha Biswal
