= Herbert D. Spivack =

American career diplomat (1917–2004)

Herbert Daniel Spivack

Chargé d’Affaires ad interim (Bangladesh)
- In office May 1972 – October 1972
- President: Richard Nixon
- Succeeded by: Daniel O. Newberry

Personal details
- Born: October 1, 1917 United States
- Died: November 12, 2004 (aged 87) San Francisco, California, United States
- Education: New York University (MA)

Herbert Daniel Spivack (1 October 1917 – 12 November 2004) was a career American diplomat who served in Iran, Burma, Cambodia, and Bangladesh.

== Early life ==
Spivack was born in October 1917. He completed his BA and MA from New York University in 1937. He completed his graduate work at Columbia University and the Pennsylvania State College. He joined the Foreign Service in 1945.

== Career ==
Spivack was the consular officer in Tehran, Iran from 1945 to 1947. From 1947 to 1949, he was the political officer at the United States Embassy in Rangoon, Burma. From 1950 to 1954, he was the economic affairs advisor in Paris, France. Spivack served as a deputy chief of mission from 1962 to 1965 in the United States Embassy in Cambodia. He was for a brief time as the chargé d'affaires of the United States Embassy in Cambodia. From 1965 to 1969, he was the economic consular of the United States Embassy in New Delhi, India.

Spivack served as the interim chargé d'affaires of the Embassy of the United States, Dhaka in Bangladesh from May to October 1972. The United States recognized Bangladesh as an independent country on 5 April 1972 after the end of Bangladesh Liberation War in 1971. Spivack was the principal diplomatic officer of the United States in Dhaka and the top diplomat at the Dhaka consulate during the war. He was recalled to Washington D.C. for consultations and was asked by President Richard Nixon to convey the recognition of the United States to President Sheikh Mujibur Rahman of Bangladesh. On 18 May 1972 the US consulate in Dhaka was upgraded to a full embassy under Spivack. From 1974 to 1975, he was the U.S. Consul General in Munich, Germany.

== Death ==
Spivack died on November 12, 2004, in San Francisco, California, United States. His body was cremated and his ashes were scattered in San Francisco Bay.

Diplomatic posts
Preceded by	Chargé d’Affaires ad interim (Bangladesh); May 1972 – October 1972	Succeeded by Daniel O. Newberry
