= Teresita Currie Schaffer =

American diplomat

Teresita (Tezi) Currie Schaffer (born 1945), a 1966 graduate of Bryn Mawr College, entered the US Foreign Service in 1966 serving for 30 years and was Ambassador to Sri Lanka. She had a concurrent appointment as Ambassador to the Maldives (1992-1995) and was Director of the Foreign Service Institute from 1995 until 1997.

Schaffer also served as Director of the Office of International Trade and Deputy Assistant Secretary of State for the Near East and South Asia (at that time, it was the senior South Asia policy position in the State Department). She is secretary of The Asia Foundation's board of trustees and a Senior Adviser to McLarty Associates, a Washington-based international strategic advisory firm.

Besides Bryn Mawr, Schaffer attended Convents of the Sacred Heart in New York, Grenoble, France, and Noroton, Connecticut, and studied at the Institut d'Etudes Politiques in Paris before attending Bryn Mawr. Schaffer was on the board of editors of The Foreign Service Journal.

== Publications ==
- India at the Global High Table: The Quest for Regional Primacy and Strategic Autonomy (Brookings Institution Press) written with husband Howard Bruner Schaffer
