= Kalani High School =

Coordinates: 21.2785°N 157.7735°W

Location
- 4680 Kalaniana'ole Highway; Honolulu, Hawaii 96821; United States

Information
- Type: Public, Co-educational
- Established: 1958
- School district: Honolulu District
- Principal: Mr. Mitchell Otani
- Faculty: 83.00 (FTE)
- Grades: 9–12
- Enrollment: 1,414 (2022–23)
- Student to teacher ratio: 17.04
- Campus: Suburban
- Color: Red White
- Athletics: Oahu Interscholastic Association
- Mascot: Falcon
- Rival: Kaimuki High School; Kaiser High School
- Newspaper: Ka Leo o Kalani
- Yearbook: Ho'omanao O Kakou
- Military: United States Army JROTC
- Website: http://kalanihighschool.org/

Kalani High School is a four-year public high school located in East Honolulu, Hawaiʻi, USA. Kalani is a part of the Hawaii Department of Education. Kalani is located on Kalanianaʻole Highway. It is accredited by the Western Association of Schools and Colleges.

Opened in 1958, Kalani serves the residential areas of Niu Valley, ʻĀina Haina, ʻĀina Koa, Maunalani Heights, Waiʻalae-Kāhala, Kāhala, and portions of the Kaimukī area. The current principal is Mitchell Otani.

Kalani's facilities include: 9 main buildings, a physical education locker/trainer facility, cafeteria, gymnasium, several portable buildings which serve as a temporary home for the Red Cross, a large building for their musical department, a swimming pool, tennis courts/basketball courts, and a marching band practice/soccer field/football field surrounded by a dirt track. A separate Judo room, and girls locker room was added in 2018.

In the 2000 U.S. census the U.S. Census Bureau defined Kalani High as being in the urban Honolulu census-designated place. For the 2010 U.S. census the bureau created a new census-designated place, East Honolulu.

== Athletics ==
Starting in the 1960s there was a decline in major athletics which was exacerbated by the opening of the Kaiser High School district in 1971. The lone exception was the 1970 baseball team as State Champion, which included Lenn Sakata, who went on to play for the Milwaukee Brewers and NY Yankees.

However, the school did excel and dominate in some of the smaller sports during this period. Including Boys Division 1 Cross Country with four consecutive OIA championships and three consecutive State championships in 1971 – 1973 under George Butterfield. This is the schools longest run of State domination. Although in later years from 1973 to 1994 there were multiple State Championships for Tennis and Bowling for boys and girls.

Kalani currently holds the Oahu Interscholastic Association (OIA) Eastern division title in girls varsity soccer, and boys varsity soccer. In the school year 2005–2006, the girls varsity basketball team won the State Division II Championship and in 2007–2008 won the OIA championship. The girls volleyball team won the OIA Championship in the 2003 season. However, the school's most notable team in recent years is their men's soccer team, which placed second in the OIA and in the State in 2007, and won in 2013. The men's soccer team is a regular contender for the state title, and remains one of the top programs in Hawaii.

The school's tennis team also took the 2010 season OIA Championship and was runner-up in the 2010 State championships. Kalani tennis boasted a back-to-back singles state champion from 2009 to 2010, Jared Spiker. In 2009, Spiker became the first O‘ahu Interscholastic Association player to win a state singles tennis title in 26 years.

The school offers a variety of other athletic programs throughout the school year. For the Fall semester, the sports include Air Riflery, Bowling, Cheer, Cross Country, Football, Soft Tennis, Girls Volleyball, and Junior Varsity Softball. During the Winter semester, students can participate in Junior Varsity Baseball, Boys Basketball, Girls Basketball, Paddling, Boys and Girls Soccer, Swimming, Junior Varsity Girls Tennis, and Wrestling. Lastly, in the Spring semester, the available sports are Varsity Baseball, Golf, Judo, Softball, Tennis, Track and Field, Boys Volleyball, and Girls Water Polo. These programs are listed on the Kalani Falcons — Official Athletics website for the 2023–2024 school year.

== Academics ==
- Kalani High School is listed "in good standing, unconditional" according to the No Child Left Behind assessment tests.
- Kalani High School's curriculum is based on the Hawaii Content and Performance Standards (HCPS III) to ensure a high quality education for all of its students.
- Kalani High School also uses Schoolwide General Learner Outcomes (GLOs) to gauge student learning and growth. The GLOs are:

- Self-Directed Learner
- Community Contributor
- Complex Thinker and Problem-Solver
- Quality Producer
- Effective Communicator
- Effective and Ethical Users of Technology

- Advance Placement courses are offered for Calculus, Statistics English Literature, English Language, Chemistry, Physics, Biology, Environmental Science, Japanese, U.S. History, Macroeconomics, World History, Psychology, Computer Science, Computer Science A, Art 2D Design, Research, and Seminar

Awards and Honors

- 2010 – 1st Place High School Division – Science Olympiad Windward Regional Tournament

== Robotics ==
Kalani High School is the home of FIRST Team 3008 Magma Robotics. Started in 2008, the team has been very successful, qualifying for FIRST Championship six consecutive years. The team participates in a variety of challenges: Vex Robotics Competition, FIRST Tech Challenge, and FIRST Robotics Competition. The team participates in various outreach events such as workshops, fairs, and demonstrations. The team has become widely known for their "Bristlebots" – a toothbrush head with a cell phone vibrator mounted on it that causes it to scurry around. The robotics team also produces MagmaCrafts, fun laser cut puzzles made for all ages. These MagmaCrafts are made in the team's Protolab, a shipping container filled with laser cutters and 3D printers.

- 2009 – Rookie Inspiration Award – FIRST Robotics
- 2010 – Regional Chairman's Award – FIRST Robotics
- 2011 – Tournament Champion – VEX Robotics
- 2012 -Regional Chairman's Award – FIRST Robotics
- 2013 – Hawaii Regional Champions – FIRST Robotics
- 2014 – Alamo Regional Champions – FIRST Robotics
- 2022- Hawaii Regional Engineering Inspiration Award- FIRST Robotics
- 2023- Port Hueneme Engineering Inspiration Award- FIRST Robotics
- 2023- Curie Division Gracious Professionalism Award- FIRST Robotics

== Small Learning Communities ==
- Freshmen students are grouped into Small Learning Communities (SLCs) which consists of team teachers. Houses include teachers from social studies, Science and English departments as well as counselors and Special Education teachers.
- At Kalani High School, SLCs take the form of houses in 9th grade well as career-oriented academies/pathways during 10th, 11th, and 12th grade. The primary purpose of houses is to help support students with the transition from middle to high school and to prepare them for entrance into the academies/pathways during their sophomore, junior, and senior years.
  - Kalani High School SLCs have three main goals:
  1. To create academic rigor and relevance
  2. To create personalization
  3. To create professional learning communities
- House/Grade Level/School Pride – An important feature of the 9th grade houses is supporting the development of school spirit. Students will be provided opportunities to build their identities as members of a house, grade level and members of the greater Kalani High School community.
  - Kalani High School Houses:
    - Zentoku
    - 'Imi'ike
    - Laulima

== Notable alumni ==
Listed alphabetically by last name (year of graduation):

- Allison Chu, model and Miss Hawaii 2016
- Vladimir Devens (1980), Chief Justice of the Hawaii Supreme Court
- Mackey Feary, musician
- Roy Gerela, football player
- John Hackleman, mixed martial arts coach
- Marcus Hill, or Dyrus, professional League of Legends player for Team SoloMid
- John C. Holzman, US Ambassador to Bangladesh
- Dustin Kimura, professional mixed martial arts fighter
- Shane Komine, baseball player
- Sam Kong, Hawaii state representative
- Ryan Kurosaki, baseball player
- Tamari Miyashiro, volleyball player
- Lenn Sakata, baseball player
- Adrian Tam, Hawaii state representative
- Dalton Tanonaka, television executive
- Mika Todd, singer
- Ehren Watada, First Lieutenant, United States Army

== Gallery ==
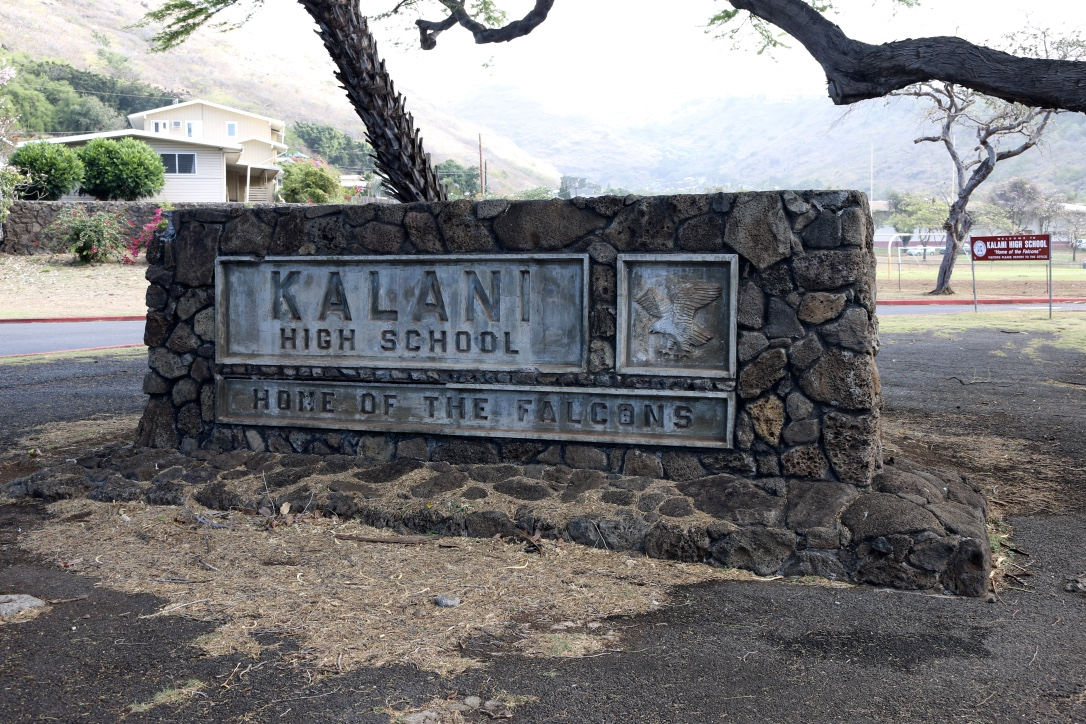
A rock wall in front of Kalani High School

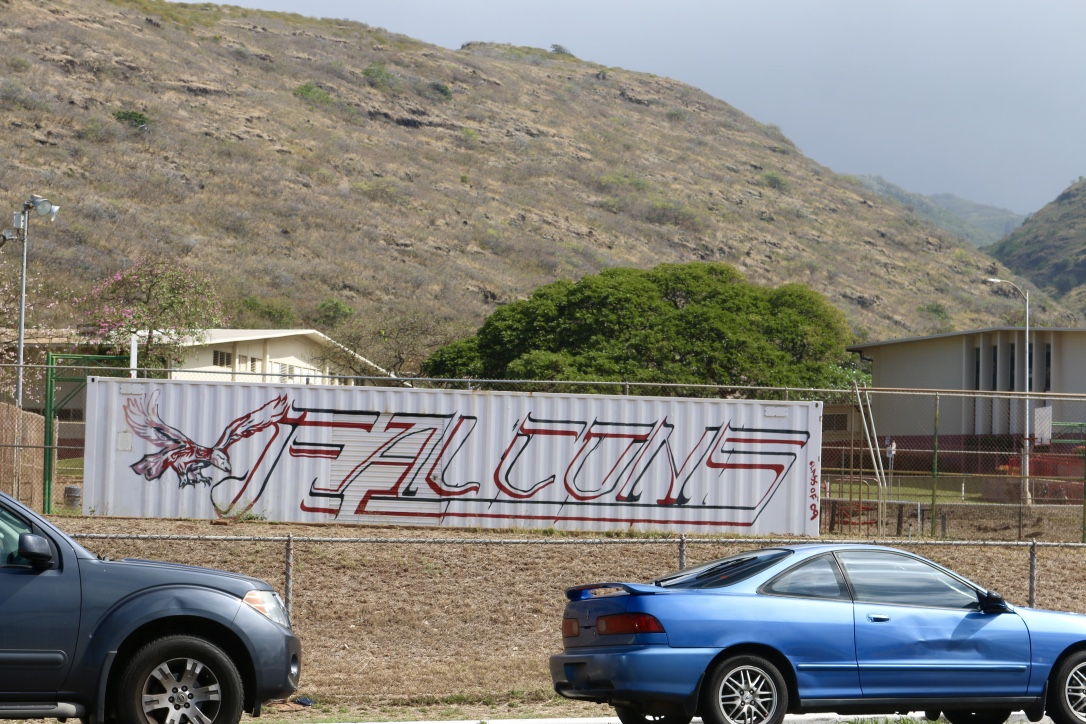
Falcon's equipment container
