= Davis Eugene Boster =

American diplomat

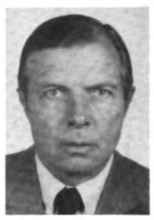

U.S. Ambassador to Guatemala
- In office October 13, 1976 – January 17, 1979
- President: Gerald Ford
- Preceded by: Francis E. Meloy Jr.
- Succeeded by: Frank V. Ortiz Jr.

U.S. Ambassador to Bangladesh
- In office February 28, 1974 – September 10, 1976
- President: Richard Nixon
- Succeeded by: Edward E. Masters

Personal details
- Born: September 14, 1920 Rio Grande, Ohio, U.S.
- Died: July 7, 2005 (aged 84) Arlington County, Virginia, U.S.

Davis Eugene Boster (September 14, 1920 – July 7, 2005) was an American diplomat.

== Early life ==
Boster was born on September 14, 1920, in Rio Grande, Ohio, United States. He graduated from Mount Union College. He served in the Navy during World War Two, both in the Atlantic and Pacific. In 1980, he retired from the Naval Reserve. He joined the foreign service in 1947.

== Career ==
Boster was posted to the United States Embassy in Moscow in 1947. In 1951 he served as the United States liaison officer to the Soviet and Eastern European delegations at the Japanese Peace Conference in San Francisco. He also served as the staff assistant to Secretary of State John Foster Dulles. From 1959 to 1962 he was the officer in charge of Soviet Union affairs in United States Embassy in Moscow.

Boster was the head of U.S. Delegation to the Conference on Security and Co-operation in Europe that would found the Organization for Security and Co-operation in Europe in 1973 and 1974. It would also lead to the signing of the Helsinki Accords. In 1974 he was appointed the first United States Ambassador to Bangladesh. He served in that position till 1976, after which he served as the United States Ambassador to Guatemala. He retired in 1979 from the Foreign Service to work as the director of Radio Liberty, a Munich based radio station that used to broadcast in the Soviet Union. From 1984 to 1990 he worked as an independent consultant on diplomatic and intelligence affairs in the Washington D.C. area.

== Personal life ==
Boster was married twice, first to Mary Shilts Boster with whom he had five children, and second to Constanza Gamero Boster with whom he had one daughter.

Diplomatic posts
Preceded by	United States Ambassador to Bangladesh; 1974–1976	Succeeded by Edward E. Masters
Preceded by Francis E. Meloy Jr.	United States Ambassador to Guatemala; 1976–1979	Succeeded by Frank V. Ortiz Jr.
