= Harry K. Thomas Jr. =

American diplomat (born 1956)

Harry Thomas
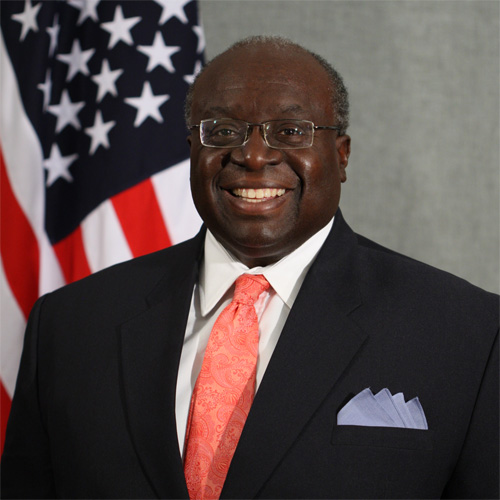

United States Ambassador to Zimbabwe
- In office February 25, 2016 – March 25, 2018
- President: Barack Obama; Donald Trump
- Preceded by: David Wharton
- Succeeded by: Brian A. Nichols

United States Ambassador to the Philippines
- In office April 27, 2010 – October 16, 2013
- President: Barack Obama
- Preceded by: Kristie Kenney
- Succeeded by: Philip S. Goldberg

27th Director General of the Foreign Service
- In office September 21, 2007 – June 24, 2009
- President: George W. Bush
- Preceded by: George McDade Staples
- Succeeded by: Nancy Jo Powell

21st Executive Secretary of the United States Department of State
- In office July 25, 2005 – July 27, 2007
- President: George W. Bush
- Preceded by: Karl W. Hofmann
- Succeeded by: Daniel Bennett Smith

United States Ambassador to Bangladesh
- In office August 14, 2003 – July 2, 2005
- President: George W. Bush
- Preceded by: Mary Ann Peters
- Succeeded by: Patricia A. Butenis

Personal details
- Born: Harry Keels Thomas Jr. June 3, 1956 (age 70) New York City, New York, U.S.
- Spouse(s): Ericka Ovette; Mithi Aquino
- Children: Casey Merie
- Education: College of the Holy Cross (BA); Columbia University (MS)

Harry Keels Thomas Jr. (born June 3, 1956) is an American diplomat who served as the U.S. ambassador to Bangladesh, the Philippines, and Zimbabwe.

== Education ==
Thomas is a graduate of the College of the Holy Cross and earned his Master's of Science in Urban Planning at Columbia University. He also has an honorary doctorate from Loyola University Maryland, where he delivered the commencement address in May 2010.

== Career ==
Thomas joined the Foreign Service in 1984. His early postings included service in the US embassies in New Delhi, India; Harare, Zimbabwe; Kaduna, Nigeria; and Lima, Peru. He also served as Executive Secretary of the United States Department of State, Director General of the U.S. Foreign Service, Director of the State Department Operations Center, and Special Assistant to the then-U.S. Secretary of State Condoleezza Rice.

Thomas served as United States Ambassador to Bangladesh (serving from 2003 to 2005) and Director General of the United States Foreign Service (serving from 2007 to 2009), Thomas was designated by US President Barack Obama on November 19, 2009, to replace Kristie Kenney as Ambassador to the Philippines—the first African American to serve at that post. He was confirmed by the United States Senate on March 19, 2010, and presented his credentials to Philippine president Gloria Macapagal Arroyo on April 27, 2010. He was then nominated and confirmed as the United States Ambassador to Zimbabwe on October 22, 2015. He was sworn in on December 8, 2015. He returned to the United States from Zimbabwe on March 25, 2018, planning to retire from the Foreign Service.

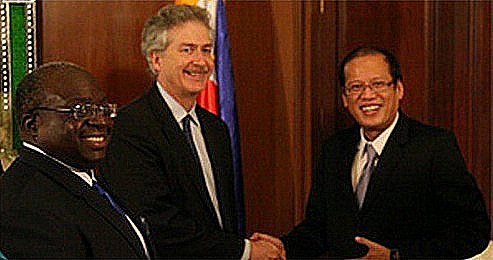
Thomas (left) with Under Secretary of State for Political Affairs William J. Burns (middle) and President Benigno S. Aquino III (right).

== Foreign languages ==
Thomas speaks English, Spanish, Hindi, Tagalog, and Bengali.

== Awards and honours ==
=== Foreign honours ===
- Philippines: Grand Cross (Datu) of the Order of Sikatuna (GrCS) (October 14, 2013)

Diplomatic posts
Preceded by Mary Ann Peters	United States Ambassador to Bangladesh; 2003–2005	Succeeded by Patricia A. Butenis
Preceded by Karl W. Hofmann	Executive Secretary to the Department of State; 2005–2007	Succeeded by Daniel Bennett Smith
Preceded by George McDade Staples	Director General of the Foreign Service; 2007–2009	Succeeded by Nancy Jo Powell
Preceded by Kristie Kenney	United States Ambassador to the Philippines; 2010–2013	Succeeded by Philip S. Goldberg
Preceded by David Wharton	United States Ambassador to Zimbabwe; 2016–2018	Succeeded by Brian A. Nichols
