= Embassy of the United States, Dhaka =

Diplomatic mission of the United States in Bangladesh

Embassy of the United States, Dhaka

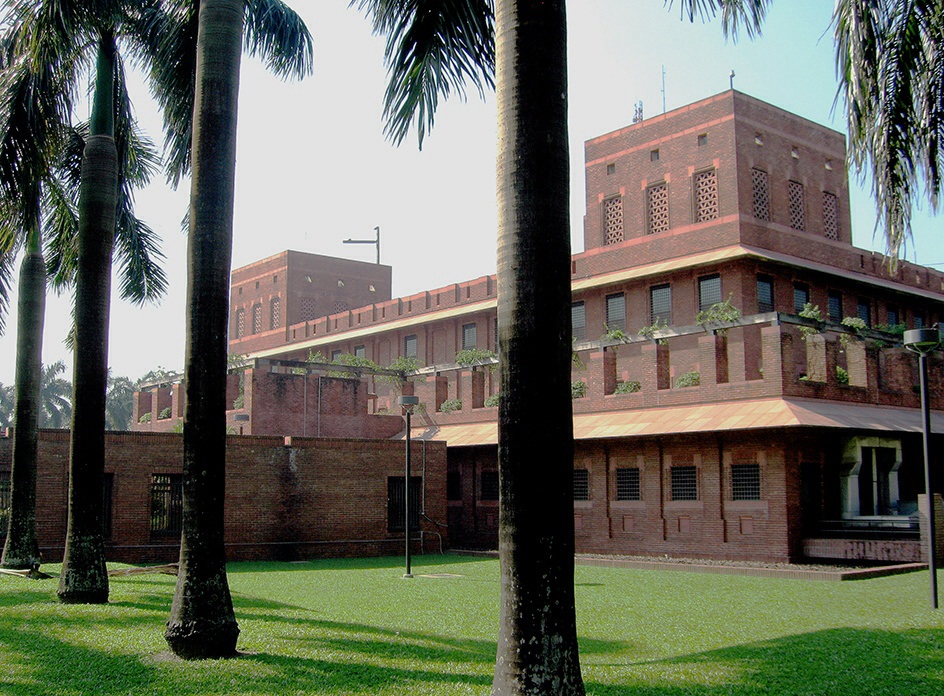
- Location: Dhaka
- Address: 12 Madani Avenue, Baridhara
- Coordinates: 23.7967°N 90.4223°E
- Ambassador: Brent T. Christensen
- Website: bd.usembassy.gov

The Embassy of the United States of America in Dhaka is the diplomatic mission of the United States in Bangladesh. It is located in Baridhara. The embassy has 400 staff led by the US Ambassador to Bangladesh.

== History ==
The United States established its consulate-general in Dacca in 1949, when the city was the capital of East Bengal in the Dominion of Pakistan.

During the independence of Bangladesh, it was the site of the famous Blood Telegram sent by then-Consul-general Archer Blood detailing atrocities committed by the Pakistani Army during Operation Searchlight.

The United States recognized the independence of Bangladesh on 4 April 1972. Herbert D. Spivack was the principal American diplomatic officer in Dhaka at the time. Four days later, the United States and Bangladesh agreed to establish diplomatic relations at the embassy level. The consulate-general was officially upgraded to an embassy on 18 May 1972.

The present embassy buildings opened in 1989.

=== Art in Embassies ===
As part of the Foundation for Art and Preservation in Embassies, artwork by Tara Andris, Nasreen Haroon, Bernadette Jiyong Frank, Allison Joyce, Mira Lehr, Stuart Peterman, Jody Rasch, Lawrence Schiller, and Michael Enn Sirvet has been included in the Embassy as of June 2020.

== Architecture ==
The US Embassy complex is inspired by Mughal Bengali architecture. The exterior surface walls are composed of terracotta brick tiles. A lawn filled with palm trees and a moat surrounds the main building. The complex is sometimes nicknamed as the "Red Fort". It was designed by the Boston architectural firm of Kallmann, McKinnell and Wood. An earlier 1974 office building was designed by Robert Marquis.

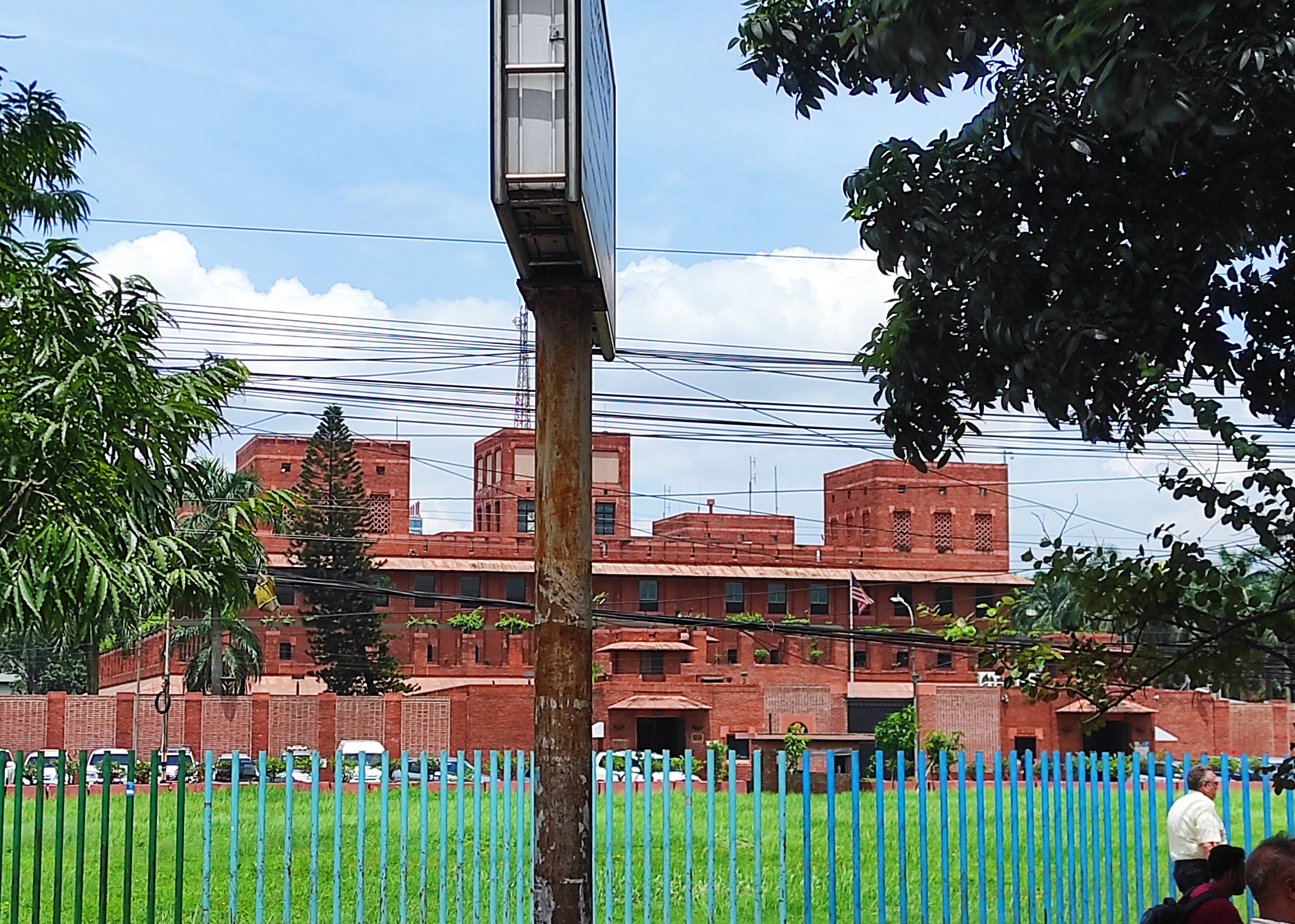
US Embassy Dhaka Building view from the Natun Bazar Road, Baridhara, Dhaka

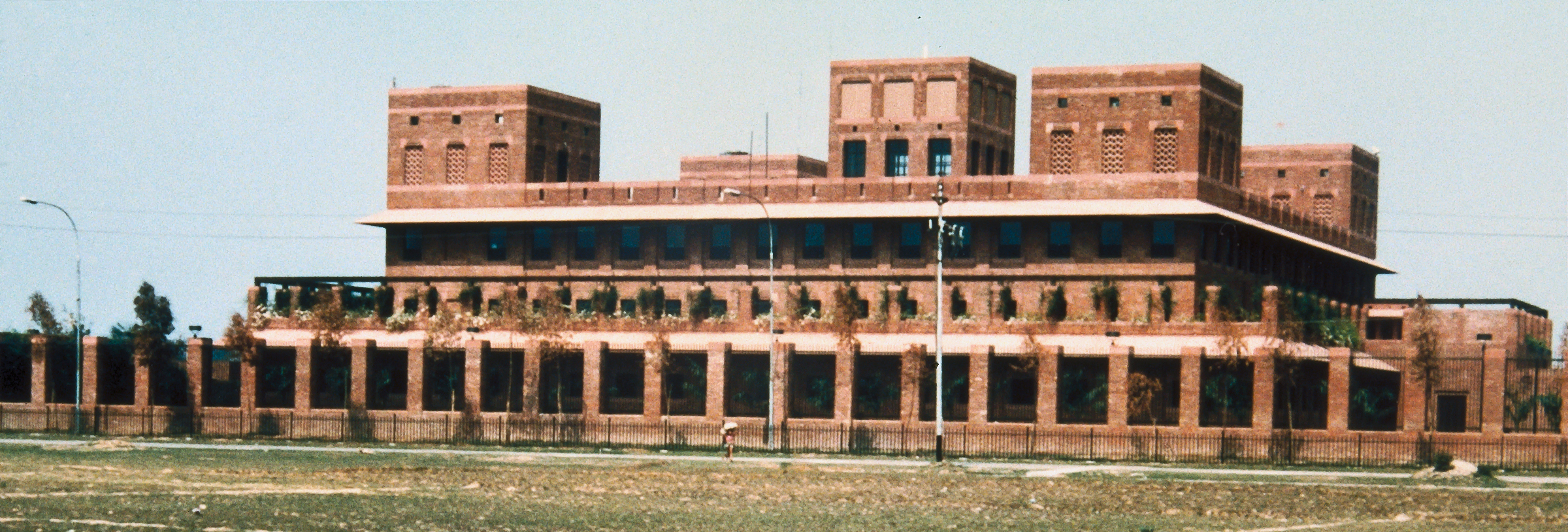
US Embassy Building in 1989

== Branches ==
- Archer K Blood American Library, Dhaka
- Edward M Kennedy Centre for Public Service and the Arts, Dhaka
- American Corner, Chittagong
- American Corner, Jessore
- American Corner, Rajshahi
- American Corner, Sylhet

== See also ==
- Bangladesh-United States relations
