= List of ambassadors of the United States to Bangladesh =

Ambassador of the United States to Bangladesh বাংলাদেশে নিযুক্ত যুক্তরাষ্ট্রের রাষ্ট্রদূত
- Seal of the United States Department of State

- Flag of a United States ambassador

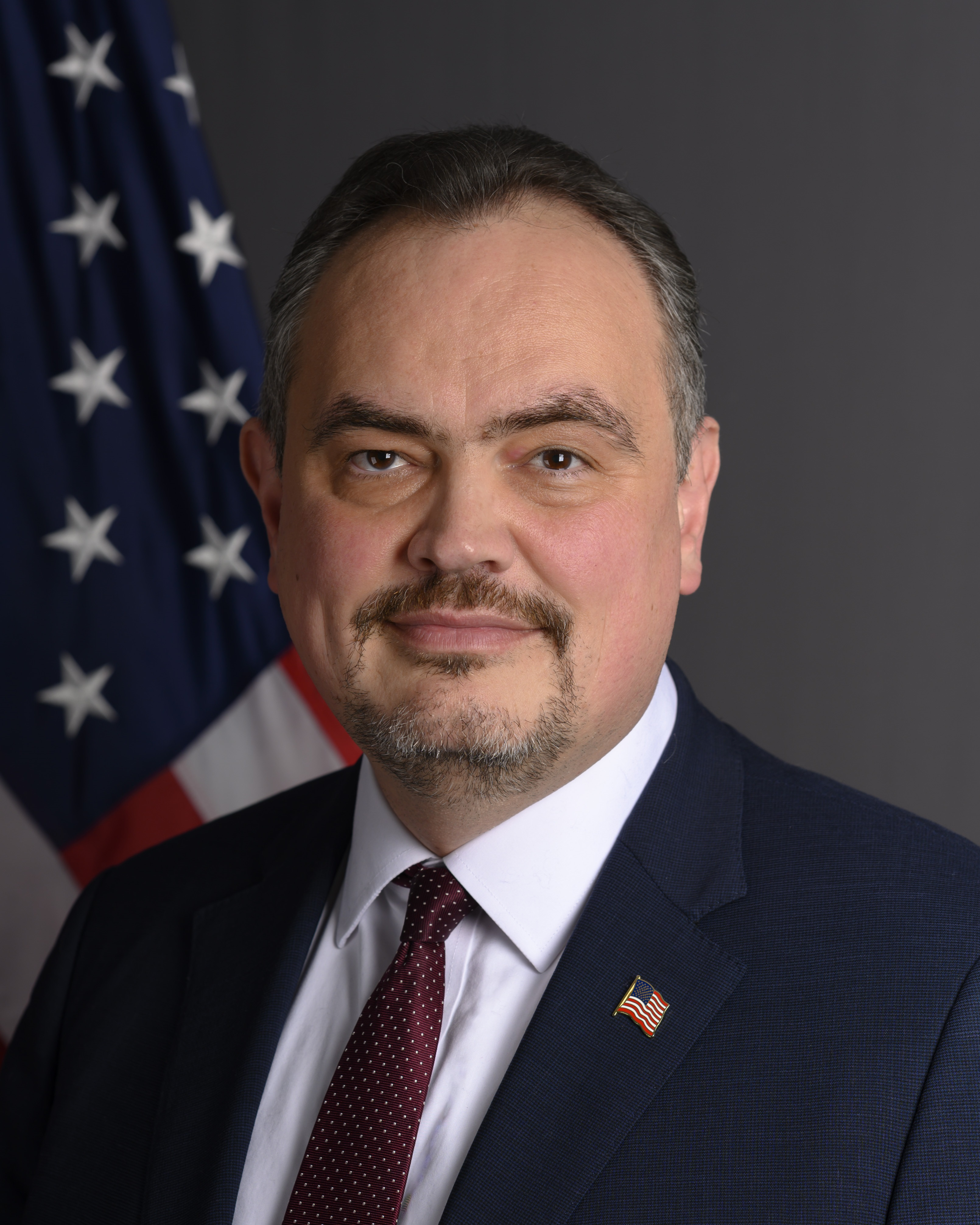
- Incumbent; Brent T. Christensen since January 15, 2026
- Style: Mr. or Madam Ambassador (informal); His or Her Excellency (diplomatic)
- Reports to: Secretary of State
- Residence: Dhaka, Bangladesh
- Seat: Embassy of the United States, Dhaka
- Nominator: The president of the United States
- Appointer: The president with Senate advice and consent
- Inaugural holder: Davis Eugene Boster as Ambassador Extraordinary and Plenipotentiary
- Formation: February 28, 1974
- Website: U.S. Embassy - Dhaka

The United States ambassador to Bangladesh is the official representative of the president of the United States to the head of state of Bangladesh.

The United States officially recognized Bangladesh after its independence. In May 1972, the United States government opened its establishment and diplomatic residence with Bangladesh. In December 1972, the nation established its new constitution. The embassy in Dhaka was established on May 18, 1972, with Herbert D. Spivack as Chargé d'Affaires ad interim. Daniel O. Newberry served as Chargé d'Affaires ad interim, October 1972–April 1974. The first ranking ambassador arrived in April 1974. Relations have been continuous and developing since that time.

The United States Embassy in Bangladesh is located in Madani Avenue, Baridhara, Dhaka.

== Ambassadors ==
President Nixon appointed Hermann F. Eilts as ambassador on September 11, 1972, but Eilts declined the appointment. The U.S. Ambassador to Bangladesh holds the title Ambassador Extraordinary and Plenipotentiary

Name	Appointed	Presented credentials	Terminated mission	Notes
Davis Eugene Boster – Career FSO	February 28, 1974	April 13, 1974	September 10, 1976	
Edward E. Masters – Career FSO	October 4, 1976	November 5, 1976	November 27, 1977	
David T. Schneider – Career FSO	March 2, 1978	March 29, 1978	July 25, 1981	
Jane Abell Coon – Career FSO	June 30, 1981	August 11, 1981	August 3, 1984	
Howard Bruner Schaffer – Career FSO	August 13, 1984	September 26, 1984	July 9, 1987	
Willard Ames De Pree – Career FSO	July 2, 1987	October 5, 1987	August 17, 1990	
William B. Milam – Career FSO	June 27, 1990	September 1, 1990	October 9, 1993	
David Nathan Merrill – Career FSO	February 11, 1994	April 5, 1994	May 14, 1997	
John C. Holzman – Career FSO	August 1, 1997	September 2, 1997	July 6, 2000	
Mary Ann Peters – Career FSO	September 15, 2000	September 25, 2000	June 19, 2003	
Harry K. Thomas, Jr. – Career FSO	May 27, 2003	August 14, 2003	July 2, 2005	
Patricia A. Butenis – Career FSO	February 21, 2006	April 13, 2006	June 23, 2007	
James F. Moriarty – Career FSO	March 26, 2008	April 21, 2008	June 17, 2011	
Nicholas Dean	June 17, 2011		November 24, 2011	Chargé d'Affaires
Dan Mozena – Career FSO	May 16, 2011	November 24, 2011	January 12, 2015	
Marcia Bernicat – Career FSO	November 18, 2014	February 4, 2015	November 2, 2018	
Earl R. Miller – Career FSO	October 11, 2018	November 29, 2018	January 21, 2022	
Peter D. Haas – Career FSO	December 18, 2021	March 15, 2022	July 23, 2024	
Helen LaFave – Career FSO	July 23, 2024		November 1, 2024	Chargé d'Affaires
Megan Bouldin – Career FSO	November 1, 2024		January 10, 2025	Chargé d'Affaires
Tracey Ann Jacobson – Career FSO	January 11, 2025		January 2, 2026	Chargé d'Affaires
Brent T. Christensen – Career FSO	October 7, 2025	January 15, 2026	Present	

== See also ==
- Bangladesh–United States relations
- Embassy of the United States, Dhaka
- Foreign relations of Bangladesh
- Ambassadors of the United States
- Ambassadors of Bangladesh
