= Embassy of the United States, Pristina =

Diplomatic mission of the United States in Kosovo

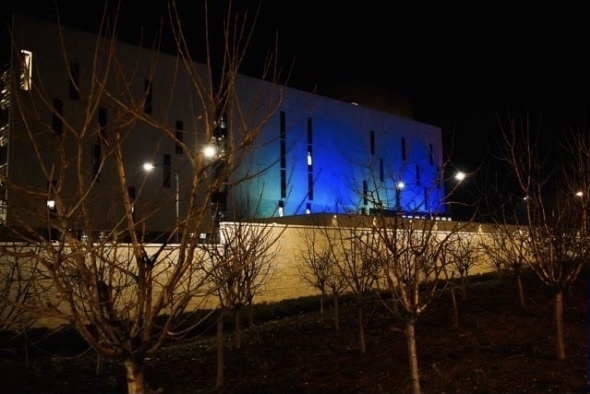
- Location: Pristina, Kosovo
- Address: Arberia/Dragodan, Rr. 4 KORRIKU Nr.25 Pristina, Kosovo
- Coordinates: 42°39′43″N 21°9′0″E
- Website: xk.usembassy.gov

The Embassy of the United States in Pristina is the diplomatic mission of the United States of America in Kosovo.

== History ==
Kosovo declared its independence from Serbia on February 17, 2008, which led to formal recognition by the United States and the establishment of diplomatic relations the following day. The U.S. Embassy in Pristina was opened on April 8, 2008 by then-Chargé d'Affaires ad interim Tina Kaidanow.

The embassy is plagued by poor air quality and unreliable electricity and internet service. In May 2023, the embassy confirmed sanctions against Kosovo following tensions in the northern region of the country. This decision, announced by the American Ambassador to Kosovo, Jeff Hovenier, included excluding Kosovo from the Air Defender 23 military exercise. The ambassador requested the Kosovo government to withdraw its police forces from key municipal buildings in Zubin Potok, Leposavić, and Zvečan. The announcement came after pressure from U.S. senators for Kosovo to sign a peace deal with Serbia.

== See also ==
- Embassy of Kosovo, Washington, D.C.
- Kosovo–United States relations
- List of ambassadors of the United States to Kosovo
