= Christopher Dell =

American diplomat (born 1956)

Christopher William Dell
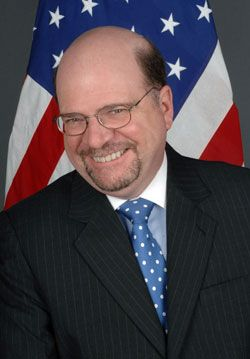

United States Ambassador to Kosovo
- In office August 24, 2009 – August 9, 2012
- President: Barack Obama
- Preceded by: Tina Kaidanow
- Succeeded by: Tracey Ann Jacobson

United States Ambassador to Zimbabwe
- In office September 2, 2004 – July 14, 2007
- President: George W. Bush
- Preceded by: Joseph Sullivan
- Succeeded by: James D. McGee

4th United States Ambassador to Angola
- In office October 26, 2001 – July 12, 2004
- President: George W. Bush
- Preceded by: Joseph Sullivan
- Succeeded by: Cynthia G. Efird

Personal details
- Born: 1956 (age 69–70) Hackensack, New Jersey, U.S.
- Education: Columbia University (BA); Balliol College, Oxford (MPhil)
- Profession: Diplomat, Career Ambassador

Military service
- Allegiance: United States of America
- Branch/service: United States Department of State
- Unit: U.S. Africa Command
- Commands: Deputy to the Commander for Civil-Military Activity, U.S. Africa Command

Christopher William Dell (born 1956) is an American diplomat who served as the U.S. ambassador to Angola, Zimbabwe, and Kosovo.

== Early life and education ==
Born in Hackensack, New Jersey, Dell moved with his family to Holmdel Township, New Jersey a year after he was born. Dell graduated in 1974 from Holmdel High School.

Dell obtained a Bachelor of Arts from Columbia University in 1978 and a Master of Philosophy from Balliol College, Oxford, in 1980.

== Diplomatic career ==
During the 1980s, Dell worked in American embassies and consulates in Mexico and Portugal, and at the Foreign Office. In the 1990s, he was posted to Mozambique and Bulgaria. In 2000–2001, he served as the Chief of Mission of the U.S. Office in Pristina, Kosovo.

From 2001 to 2004, Christopher Dell was U.S. ambassador to Angola.

=== Posting to Zimbabwe ===
Dell was appointed US ambassador to Zimbabwe on July 2, 2004, and presented his credentials in Harare on September 2. During his tenure, the government of President Robert Mugabe has carried out Operation Murambatsvina, which has been described by Mugabe as an "urban renewal" program and by his political opponents as a crackdown on the urban poor. Western governments, including that of the United States, have condemned it.

Relations between the United States and Zimbabwe have deteriorated as a result of both Operation Murambatsvina and the humanitarian situation in the country, which the United States has blamed on official corruption and mismanagement. In addition, the US named Zimbabwe an abuser of human rights in 2004 annual report.

As a result of tense relations, Dell has borne the brunt of the Zimbabwe government's displeasure. In mid-October 2005, he was detained for entering a restricted area of the Harare Botanical Gardens. A few weeks later, at a public lecture in the city of Mutare, Dell blamed corruption for the food shortages in the country, which the Zimbabwe government blames on foreign sanctions. On November 8, 2005, Dell was summoned to meet President Mugabe and was told to "go to hell." The following day, the ambassador was recalled to the United States for consultations. He subsequently returned.

Dell publicly condemned the beating of several opposition Movement for Democratic Change leaders and protestors, which occurred on March 11, 2007, including that of party leader, Morgan Tsvangirai.

On March 19, acting on orders from President Mugabe, Foreign Minister Simbarashe Mumbengegwi summoned Dell and other western diplomats to his ministry to receive an official warning to stop interfering in the country's internal affairs. When Mumbengegwi refused to allow the diplomats an opportunity to ask questions, Dell walked out, describing the meeting as a "sham" for the benefit of the state media, who were filming the proceedings. Dell left Harare the same day for London. The State Department stated that he would return to Zimbabwe soon.

On July 14, 2007, Dell left his posting in Zimbabwe without bidding Mugabe farewell. According to Zimbabwean state radio, at the time of his departure he was disappointed because Mugabe remained in office. Dell was then appointed deputy chief of mission in Afghanistan.

=== Posting in Afghanistan ===
From 2007 to 2009, Dell was Deputy Chief of Mission of the U.S. Embassy in Kabul.

=== Posting in Kosovo ===
On May 27, 2009, President Barack Obama nominated Dell to be Ambassador to the Republic of Kosovo. He was confirmed by the United States Senate on July 10, 2009 and sworn in on July 31, 2009. He was succeeded by Ambassador Tracey Ann Jacobson.

=== Posting to Africom ===
On September 15, 2012, Ambassador Christopher Dell was appointed the civilian deputy to General Ham, United States Africa Command.

In April 2014, an article appeared in The Guardian on how Dell after his posting had joined Bechtel, a company he had heavily lobbied for to obtain a controversial contract to build an expensive highway, in the poorest country in Europe. A 2015 article in Foreign Policy also criticized Dell's action, stating that "One of Europe's poorest countries wanted a road, so U.S. mega-contractor Bechtel sold it a $1.3 billion highway, with the backing of a powerful American ambassador [Dell]. Funny thing is, the highway is barely being used—and the ambassador is now working for Bechtel."

== Career service ==
- Civilian deputy to General Ham, Commander of U.S. Africa Command, September 15, 2012 – present.
- Ambassador to the Republic of Kosovo, July 31, 2009 – 2012.
- Deputy Chief of Mission, Afghanistan, 2007 - July 30, 2009
- Ambassador to Zimbabwe, 2004–2007
- Ambassador to Angola, 2001-2004
  (Appointed on August 4, 2001; presented his credentials on October 26; left his post on July 12, 2004)
- Chief of Mission, U.S. Office, Pristina, Kosovo, 2000-2001
- Deputy Chief of Mission, U.S. Embassy Sofia, Bulgaria, 1997–2000
- Deputy Director, Office of Regional Political Affairs, Bureau of European and Canadian Affairs, 1994–1996
- Deputy Chief of Mission, U.S. Embassy, Maputo, Mozambique, 1991–1994
- Special Assistant to the Under Secretary for International Security Affairs, 1989–1991
- Executive Assistant to the Special Negotiator for Greek Bases Agreement, Bureau of European and Canadian Affairs, 1987–1989
- Desk Officer for Spain and Portugal, Bureau of European and Canadian Affairs, 1986–1987
- Staff Assistant, Bureau of Political-Military Affairs, 1985–1986
- Political Officer, US Embassy Lisbon, Portugal, 1984–1985
- Vice Consul, US Consulate Oporto, Portugal, 1983–1984
- Vice Consul, US Consulate Matamoros, Mexico, 1981–1983

Diplomatic posts
Preceded by Joseph Gerard Sullivan	United States Ambassador to Angola; 2001–2004	Succeeded by Cynthia G. Efird
Preceded by Joseph Gerard Sullivan	United States Ambassador to Zimbabwe; 2004–2007	Succeeded by James D. McGee
Preceded by Tina Kaidanow	United States Ambassador to Kosovo; 2009–2012	Succeeded by Tracey Ann Jacobson
