= Kosovo–United States relations =

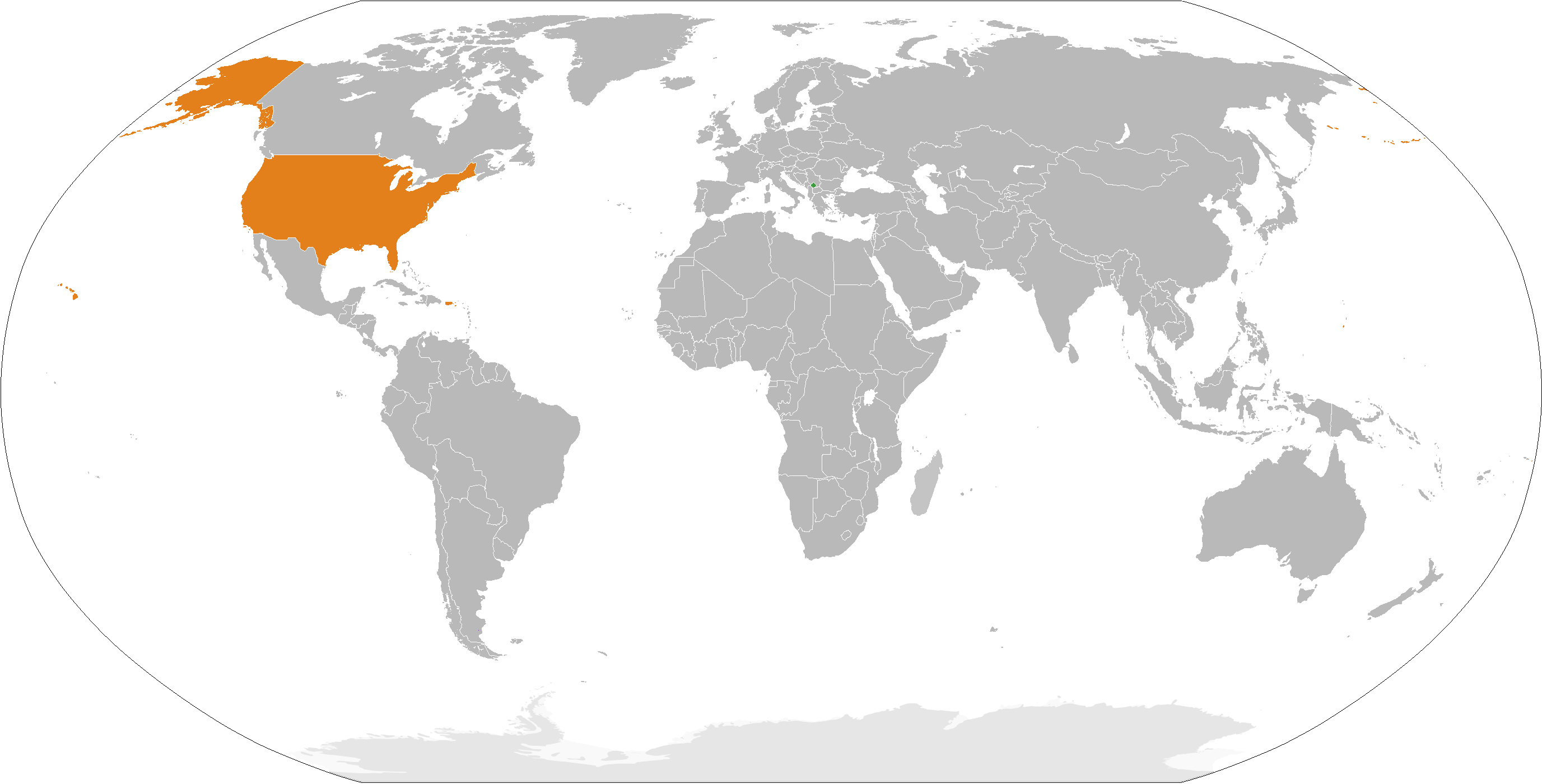

- Kosovo: United States

Diplomatic mission
- Embassy of Kosovo, Washington, D.C.: Embassy of the United States, Pristina

Envoy
- Ambassador Ilir Dugolli: Chargé d'affaires ad interim Anu Prattipati

The United States officially recognized Kosovo as a country on February 18, 2008, one day after the Kosovar declaration of independence from Serbia. Since then, the two countries have maintained relations, with Kosovo considering the United States one of its most important allies. Kosovo has dedicated several monuments to American politicians deemed instrumental to the nation's independence, especially Bill Clinton. Most Kosovars consistently approve of the United States government, often posting the highest percentages in polls among European nations.

In 2009, then-U.S. Vice President Joe Biden visited Kosovo. In 2020, U.S. President Donald Trump mediated economic diplomacy efforts between Kosovo and Serbia, hosting negotiations for the Kosovo–Serbia economic agreement at the White House in Washington, D.C.

== History ==
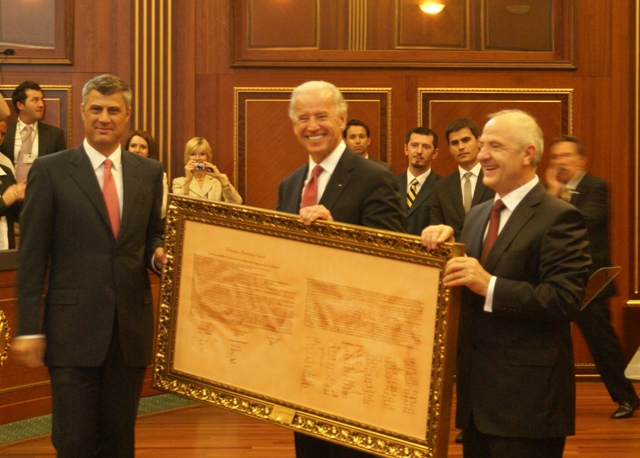
Prime Minister Hashim Thaçi (left), U.S. Vice President Joe Biden (centre) and President Fatmir Sejdiu (right) with Kosovo Declaration of Independence, 2009

The US established full diplomatic relations at Ambassador level with the Republic of Kosovo. Kosovo considers the United States its greatest partner in gaining recognition from the rest of the world, and such view is also expressed from United States Officials.

The United States and Kosovo established diplomatic relations on February 18, 2008. U.S. President George W. Bush on February 19, 2008 stated that recognizing Kosovo as an independent nation would "bring peace to a region scarred by war". The bilateral ties the United States shares with Kosovo are maintained through the U.S. Embassy in Pristina, which was opened on April 8, 2008 by then-Chargé d'Affaires ad interim Tina Kaidanow. Prior to the declaration of independence, the United States maintained U.S. Office Pristina (USOP), with a chief of mission.

The US has a large military base in Kosovo named Camp Bondsteel, and it forms part of its defence strategy for the region. It also continues to contribute troops to the Kosovo Force (KFOR), along with staff for the ICO and EULEX missions.

During the European Commission-hosted international Donors' Conference on July 11, 2008 the United States pledged $400 million for 2008–2009 to support, among many other things, helping relieve debt Kosovo may inherit. U.S. assistance in Kosovo continues to support governance through strengthening civil society and political processes, especially targeting minority communities, and aims to strengthen economic institutions and help private enterprise grow.

In May 2009, then-Vice President Biden visited Kosovo and was greeted by large crowds. He affirmed the US position that Kosovan "independence is irreversible". The Obama administration remained committed to Kosovo. He returned to Kosovo in August 2016 to attend a ceremony that renamed a southeastern highway "Joseph R. 'Beau' Biden, III" to honour his son Beau's contribution to Kosovo for training its judges and prosecutors. Beau was also posthumously awarded a Presidential Medal on the Rule of Law by the Kosovan government in 2021, when his father had become President.

Kosovo has named certain places in Pristina after U.S. leaders such as Bill Clinton Boulevard and George W. Bush Street. Around Pristina, other streets are named after former military commanders involved in the NATO campaign, honouring their role to conflict between local Albanians and the Yugoslav army. The capital also has a women's clothing shop named Hillary, after Hillary Clinton and atop on some large buildings and hotels architectural features replicating US monuments and symbols like the Statue of Liberty or the bald eagle. In Kosovo, Bill Clinton is considered an iconic figure and hero. Many US flags are flown throughout Kosovo from buildings. The US donated funds and built one of the largest film studios in Europe, located in the suburbs of Pristina.

Widespread sentiments of gratitude are held by people in Kosovo to the US for playing a major role in ending Serb control of the area. These sentiments increased, including support toward the US, especially after it recognised Kosovan independence. The Kosovo population also support the US engagement with the Balkans, which is viewed as anti-Serbian. After the Kosovo War, the US remains popular among the Kosovo Albanian population. According to the 2012 U.S. Global Leadership Report, 87% of Kosovars approve of U.S. leadership, the highest rating for any survey in Europe. According to a 2016 report by Gallup, Kosovo led the region and the world again in approval for the second consecutive year, with 85% approving of U.S. leadership. According to a recent report by Gallup of U.S. Leadership on Trump's term, Kosovo led the region and the world again in approving of U.S leadership with 75% approval.

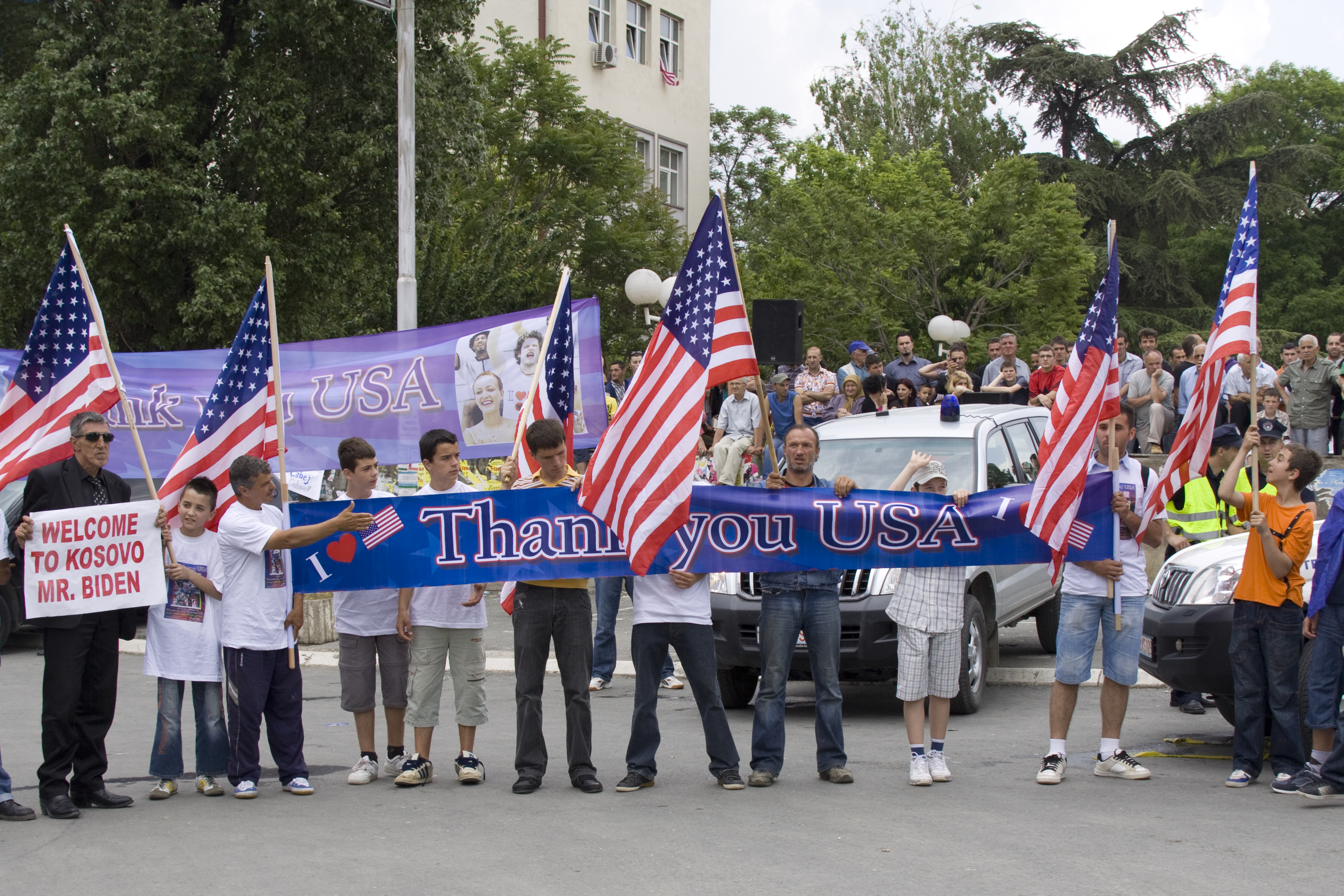
Kosovo Albanians with US flags and banners, 2009

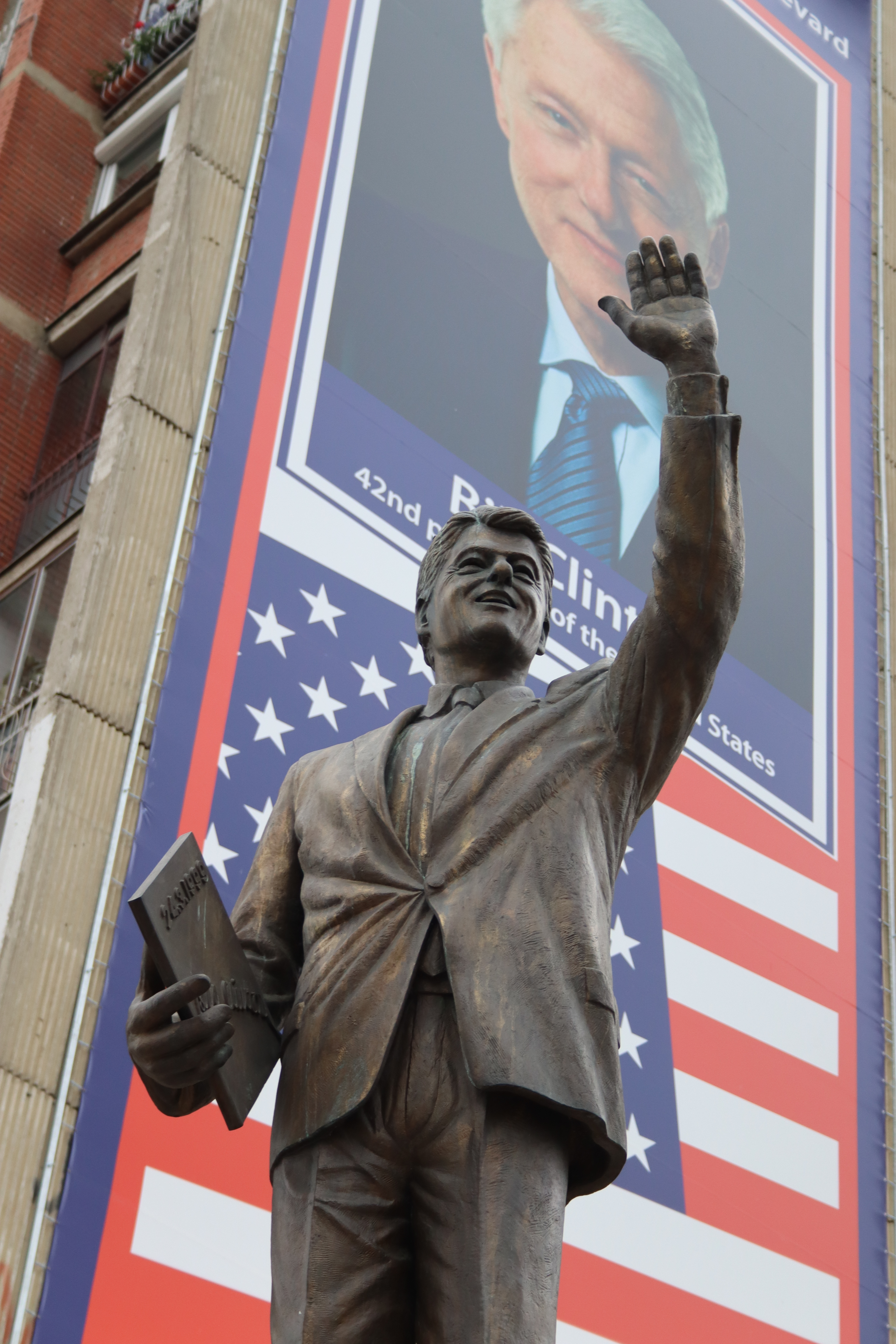
Bill Clinton statue in Pristina

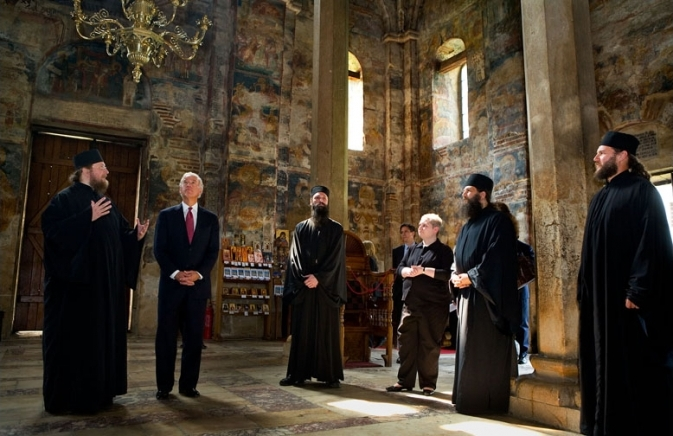
Joe Biden on a tour of the Visoki Dečani in 2009

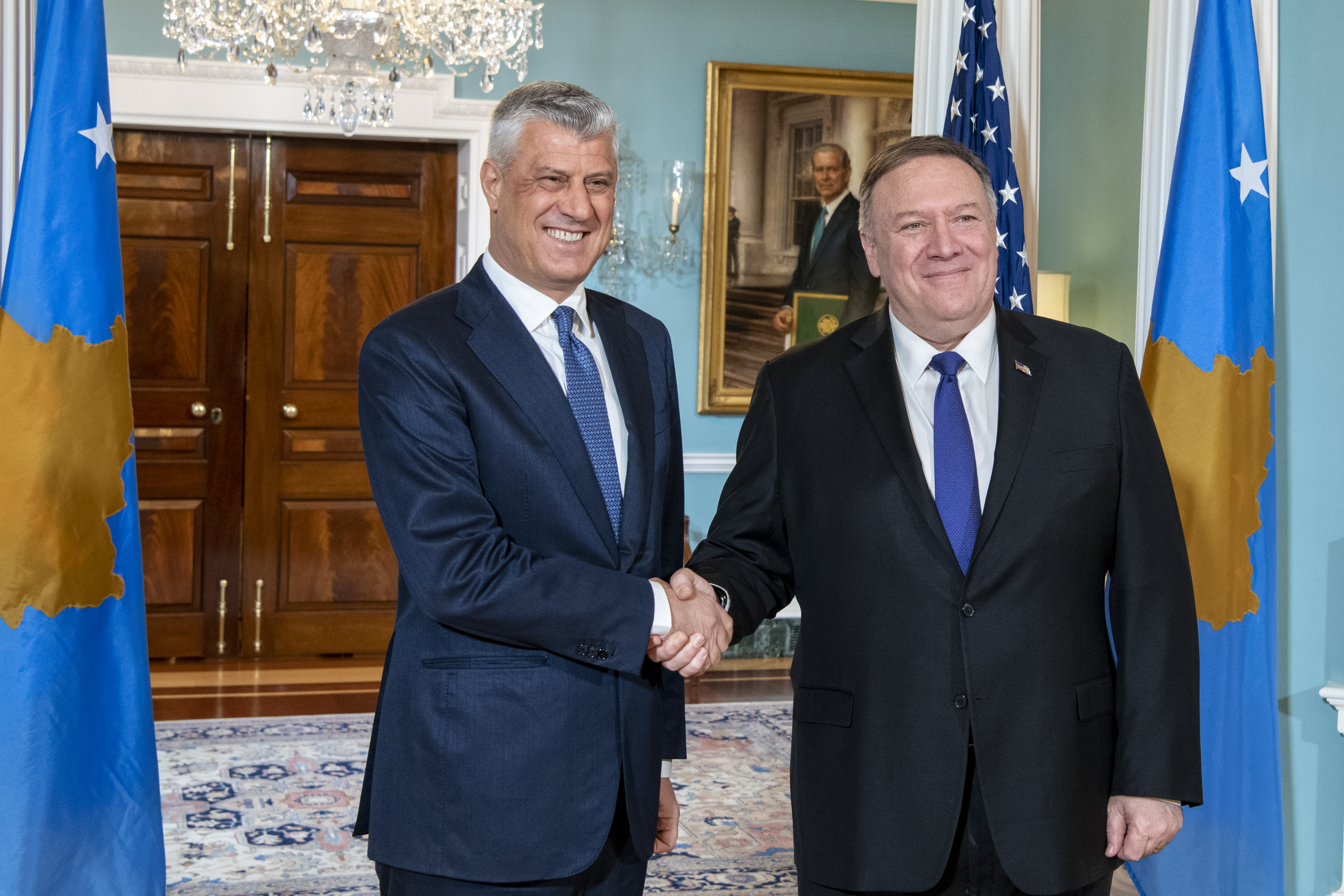
Kosovo President Hashim Thaci (left) with US Secretary of State Mike Pompeo (right) in 2020

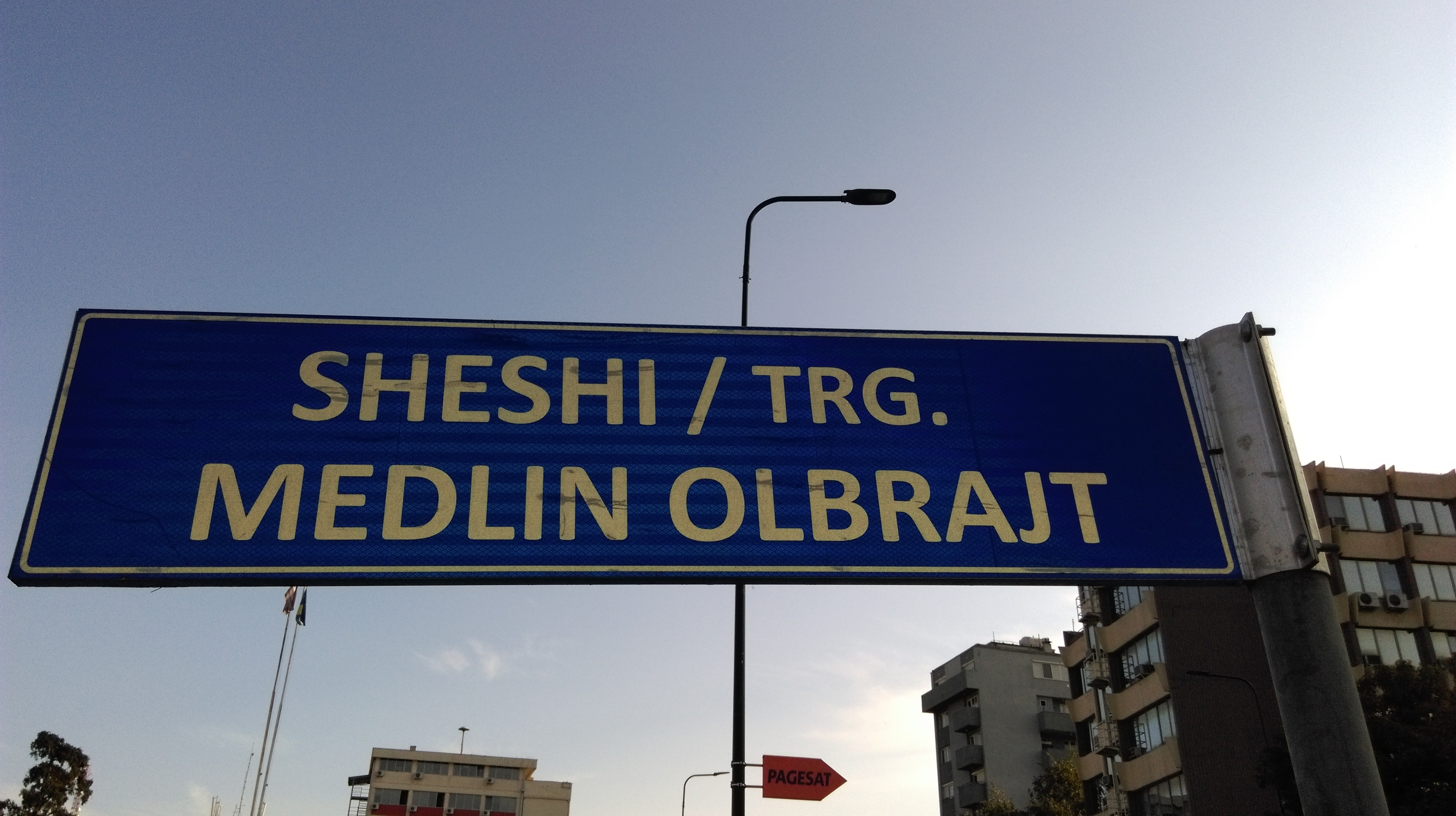
Medlin Olbrajt Square in Prishtinë, Kosovo named in honor of Madeleine Albright

== US-mediated Kosovo–Serbia negotiations ==
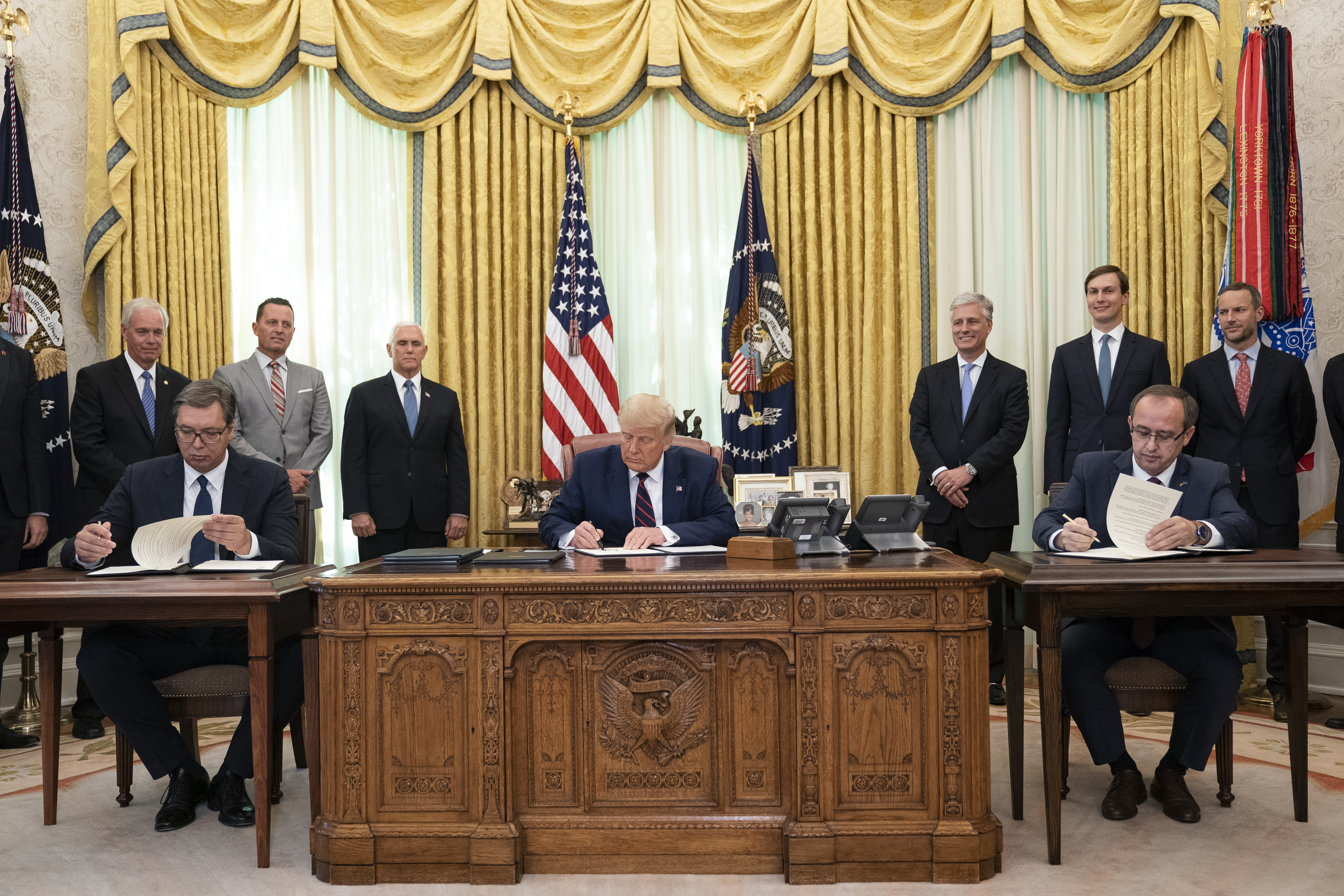
Aleksandar Vučić, President of Serbia (left), Donald Trump, President of the United States (middle), and Avdullah Hoti, Prime Minister of Kosovo (right), signing the 2020 Kosovo and Serbia economic agreements in the White House, September 2020.

On October 4, 2019, U.S. President Donald Trump appointed Richard Grenell as the Special Presidential Envoy for Serbia and Kosovo Peace Negotiations. After months of diplomatic talks, on January 20, 2020, Serbia and Kosovo agreed to restore flights between Belgrade and Pristina for the first time in over 20 years.

On September 4, 2020, the President of Serbia, Aleksandar Vučić, and the Prime Minister of Kosovo, Avdullah Hoti, signed an agreement on the normalisation of economic relations between Serbia and Kosovo at the White House. The deal will encompass freer transit, including by rail and road, while both parties agreed to work with the Export–Import Bank of the United States and the U.S. International Development Finance Corporation and to join the Mini Schengen Zone, but the agreement also included the mutual recognition between Israel and Kosovo.

The United States, along with other western countries like France, Germany, Italy and the United Kingdom have engaged with the governments of Kosovo and Serbia to find a practical solution which would allow eligible citizens of Kosovo to exercise their right to participate in Serbia’s 2022 elections.

== U.S. embassy ==
The office of the United States Ambassador to Kosovo is currently vacant, with Anu Prattipati serving as the Chargé d’affaires since December 30, 2024. She replaced Jeffrey Hovenier, the sixth United States Ambassador to Kosovo.

== Kosovo embassy ==
Ilir Dugolli is the current ambassador from Kosovo to the U.S. The Embassy of the Republic of Kosovo in the United States is located in Washington DC. There also exist two Consulates of Kosovo within the U.S. located in New York City, NY and Des Moines, IA.

== See also ==
- Yugoslav emigrants to the United States
- Serbian emigrants to the United States
- Kosovan emigrants to the United States
- Serbia–United States relations
- List of ambassadors of Kosovo to the United States
- United States–Yugoslavia relations
