= Special Representative of the UN Secretary-General for Haiti =

Special representative of the UN secretary general

Special Representative of the UN Secretary-General for Haiti of The United Nations
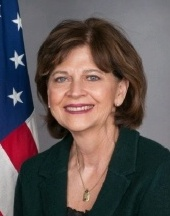
- Incumbent; Helen La Lime since October 2019
- United Nations Integrated Office in Haiti
- Reports to: Secretary-General of the UN

The Special Representative of the UN Secretary-General for Haiti is the chief diplomatic representative of the Secretary-General of the United Nations in Haiti. The incumbent, appointed by UN Secretary-General António Guterres, is Helen La Lime. This position is functionally coexistent with the UN Special Representative heading the UN Mission for Justice Support in Haiti (MINUHUSTH).

In their capacity as a UN envoy, the Special Representative heads the United Nations Integrated Office in Haiti. The BINUH was established by the UN Security Council in 2019 by Resolution 2476 per chapter VI of the Charter of the United Nations.

Their first mandate is to advise the Haitian government in developing rule of law, political stability, promoting human rights, and advancing a peaceful and stable environment, amongst others. Their second mandate is assisting, through advising, the Haitian government in various areas: dialogue and reforms, elections, police professionalism, community violence reduction, justice reform, prison conditions, and human rights protection.

The office called for democratic renewal in February of 2021 in Haiti, due to massive polarization in the presidency of Jovenel Moïse. This was due to the ceased function of the Haitian Parliament in January 2021, and the fears that the country was slipping from democracy.

The efforts and importance of the Special Representative and UN came to the forefront in international politics in 2021 with the Assassination of Jovenel Moïse, the President of Haiti.
