= Dissent Channel =

Official platform open to U.S. diplomats where they can criticize government policy

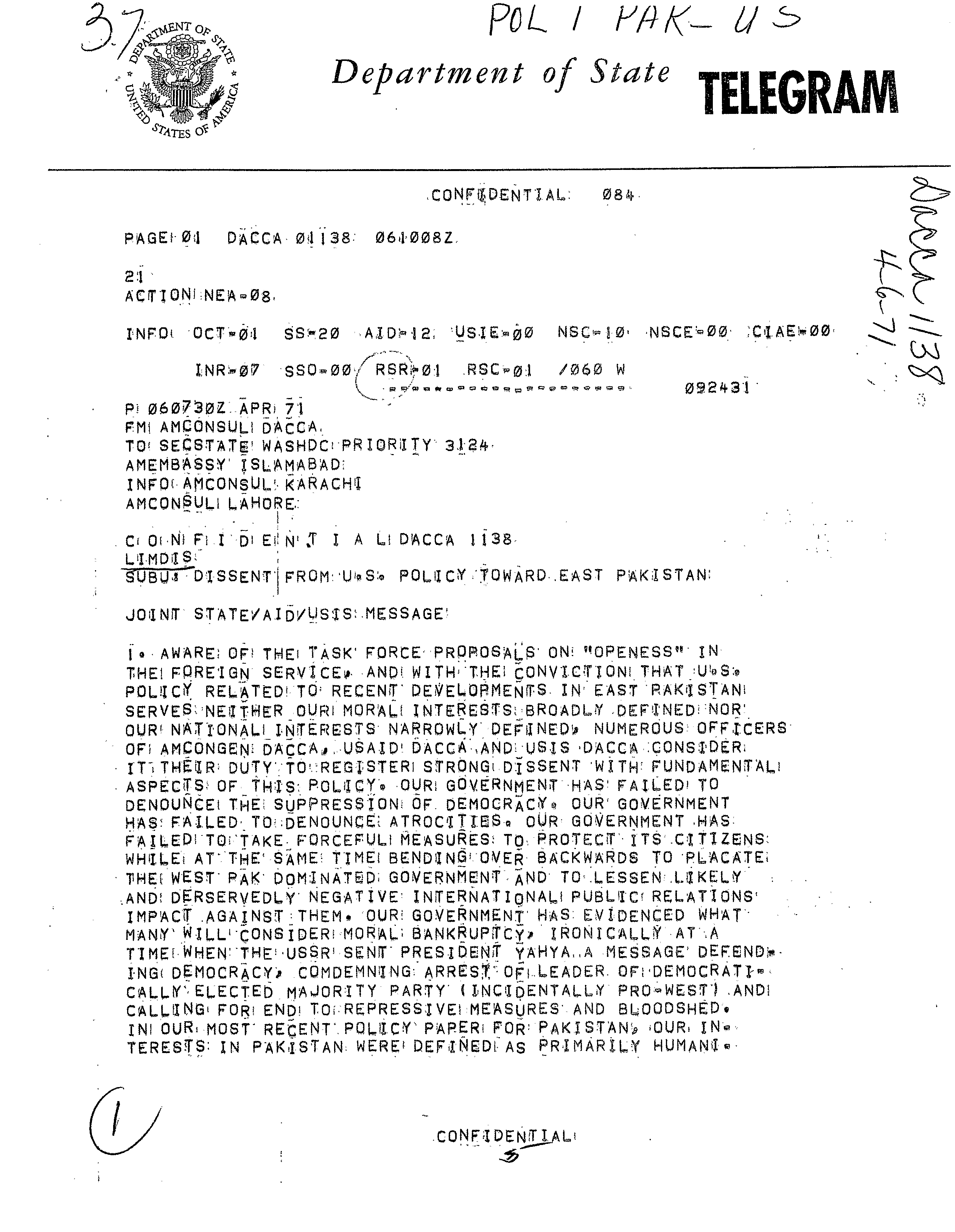
A 1971 telegram sent by diplomat Archer Blood, decrying the U.S. failure to intervene in genocide by the Pakistani army in Bangladesh

The Dissent Channel is a messaging framework open to Foreign Service officers and other U.S. citizens employed by the United States Department of State and Agency for International Development (USAID), (Note: Prior to the disestablishment of the U.S. Information Agency and the Arms Control and Disarmament Agency, employees of those agencies could use the Dissent Channel as well.) through which they are invited to express constructive criticism of government policy.

Established in 1971, the Dissent Channel was used 123 times in its first four decades. In modern times, about four or five dissent cables are sent each year. U.S. foreign policies that have been the subject of dissent cables have varied widely. The 1971 Blood telegram, named for its author Archer Blood, condemned the U.S. policy of support for Pakistani dictator Yahya Khan, who oversaw a genocide in East Pakistan. Other dissent cables have criticized U.S. support for various authoritarian leaders, dissented from U.S. inaction in crises and genocides, or criticized U.S. involvement in various military conflicts. For example, a 1992 dissent cable protesting the U.S. failure to act during the Bosnian genocide is credited with helping lead to the Dayton Accords. The dissent cable with the largest number of signatories, by far, was a 2017 dissent cable condemning President Donald Trump's executive order imposing a travel and immigration ban on the nationals of seven majority-Muslim countries; about 1,000 diplomats are listed as signatories.

Dissent cables circulate to senior State Department officials; messages receive a response from the department's Policy Planning Staff. Under department regulations, diplomats who submit dissent cables are supposed to be protected from retaliation or reprisal. Nevertheless, some U.S. diplomats are hesitant to use the Dissent Channel for fear that it could impede their career progress.

== History and uses ==
The Dissent Channel was established in 1971, as a response to concerns that dissenting opinions and constructive criticism were suppressed or ignored during the Vietnam War. Secretary of State William P. Rogers created the system. In February 1971, the right of Foreign Service officers to dissent was explicitly codified in the Foreign Affairs Manual.

The Dissent Channel is reserved for "...consideration of responsible dissenting and alternative views on substantive foreign policy issues that cannot be communicated in a full and timely manner through regular operating channels or procedures." Use of the channel is reserved for dissenting or alternative views on policy concerns; views on "management, administrative, or personnel issues that are not significantly related to matters of substantive foreign policy may not be communicated through the Dissent Channel." Messages sent to the Dissent Channel are distributed to senior members of the State Department's Policy Planning Staff, must be acknowledged within 2 days, and must receive a response within 30–60 days.

Diplomats who write such dissent cables are supposed to be protected from retaliation or reprisal. The Foreign Affairs Manual provides that "[f]reedom from reprisal for Dissent Channel users is strictly enforced." Nevertheless, many U.S. diplomats fear to use the channel for fear of retaliation. A 2020 Project on Government Oversight study of dissent channels used at the State Department and five other federal agencies found that most were "used infrequently" and that "Across presidential administrations, irrespective of political party, and at agencies across the government these channels are often viewed as ineffectual, and many career employees with access to a dissent channel still fear retaliation for using it."

From 1971 to 2011, there were 123 dissent cables. A 2020 report stated that over its half-century of existence, the Dissent Channel averaged between five and ten uses per year. The most dissent cables sent in a single year came in 1977, when 28 dissent cables were filed "under the Carter Administration, which everyone agrees created an atmosphere in which use of the channel was encouraged—or at least not stigmatized." Some of the surge in Dissent Channel use in the late 1970s was attributable to a single individual.

After Ronald Reagan became president, the number of dissent cables declined sharply, to 15 in 1981 and just five in 1982. This decline was due to a feeling in "U.S. embassies around the world ... that the Reagan White House and State Department were not receptive to viewpoints that diverged from the ambassadors' assessments," and that dissenting cables was likely to damage a diplomat's career. For example, some diplomats feel that using the Dissent Cable reduces their chance of appointment to an ambassadorial post. In the 2010s, about four or five dissent cables were sent each year.

Some notable uses of the Dissent Channel include:

- In March 1971, Archer Blood, the U.S. consul-general in Dhaka, joined by 28 other U.S. diplomats, sent the famous Blood telegram. The cable condemned the U.S. policy of support for Pakistani dictator Yahya Khan, who oversaw a genocide in East Pakistan (later Bangladesh).
- In 1972, a dissent cable strongly criticized the U.S. bombing of Haiphong Harbor, arguing that this constituted "a breach of the spirit if not the letter of our stated policy to disengage from the Indo-China conflict."
- Also in 1972, a dissent cable criticized the U.S. "policy of non-intervention in Burundi during massive murdering of Hutu tribesmen" and argued that a genocide was occurring in Burundi.
- In a July 1972 dissent cable, diplomat Alexander Peaslee wrote that he was retiring from the Foreign Service in disgust over the My Lai Massacre and other atrocities in Vietnam, writing: "One of the reasons for retiring at the age of 50 after 29 years of government service is that I do not want to be associated with the actions of an executive branch that takes no effective steps against atrocities too similar to those of the Nazis."
- In 1978, a dissent cable criticized U.S. support for the dictatorial Somoza regime in Nicaragua.
- In 1982, a dissent cable urged the U.S. government not to give unconditional recognition to the regime of General Efraín Ríos Montt, who had seized power in Guatemala in a coup.
- In 1992, several Foreign Service officers used the channel to protest U.S. failure to act during the Bosnian genocide. The cable is credited with helping lead to the Dayton Accords.
- In 1994, four career diplomats at the U.S. Embassy in Dublin sent a dissent memorandum questioning the decision of U.S. Ambassador Jean Kennedy Smith to grant a U.S. visa to Sinn Féin leader Gerry Adams. Two of the four signatories received career-damaging performance appraisals from Smith and were "excluded from Embassy functions relevant to their jobs." This led to a yearlong investigation by the State Department Inspector General's office, which issued a "scathingly critical" report that found "inescapable evidence" that Smith had retaliated against the two diplomats.
- In 1997, then-U.S. Ambassador to Angola Donald Steinberg sent a dissent cable (entitled "Dissent Against U.S. Positions on Landmines at Oslo APL Conference") that criticized a State Department instruction directing ambassadors in the developing world to press other governments to weaken anti-personnel landmine measures in the Ottawa Treaty (which was then under negotiation) by allowing "the United States and presumably other countries to exercise numerous waivers, exempt anti-tank weapons, exclude South Korea, and accept lengthy implementation timeframes." In his cable, Steinberg referred to the U.S. position as "indefensible, filled with contradictions, and inconsistent with true U.S. national security and foreign policy interests" and referred to the devastating effects of mines on civilian populations after the Angolan Civil War, writing, "How can America's global responsibilities and foreign policy interests dictate that we protect weapons so horrible and barbaric that virtually all our closest allies are seeking a global treaty to eliminate them without delay?" The cable was declassified in 2020.
- In early 2003, Ann Wright, the chargé d'affaires in Mongolia, used the channel to protest the impending U.S. invasion of Iraq. John Brady Kiesling, another U.S. diplomat, also used the dissent cable to express opposition to the war. In 2004, diplomat Keith W. Mines, then posted to Budapest, sent a dissent cable arguing that the United Nations should be given charge over the political transition in Iraq.
- In June 2016, 51 Foreign Service officers used the channel to protest the U.S.'s failure to intervene in Syria, a record number at the time. The cable—a draft copy of which was obtained by The New York Times—called for limited military strikes against the Assad regime.
- In January 2017, about 1,000 Foreign Service officers signed a dissent cable condemning Donald Trump's Executive Order 13769, which imposed a travel and immigration ban on the nationals of seven majority-Muslim countries. This is by far the largest number to ever sign on to a dissent cable.
- In July 2017, State Department officials sent a dissent cable accusing Secretary of State Rex W. Tillerson of violating federal law (specifically, the Child Soldiers Prevention Act) by failing to designate Myanmar, Iraq and Afghanistan as countries that recruit, use, or fund child soldiers on the annual Trafficking in Persons Report. Countries designated as involved with child soldiers are barred from receiving certain U.S. "security assistance and commercial licensing of military equipment" unless a presidential waiver based on the national interest is issued. The officials who signed onto the memo wrote that the choice to exclude Myanmar, Iraq, and Afghanistan from the child-soldier list was harmful to the State Department's credibility, sent a message that "that minimal efforts are enough," and signaled that the U.S. was "not interested in holding countries accountable" for abuses. The dissent cable became public in November 2017, after Reuters obtained a copy.
- In 2019, as State Department morale and confidence in leadership plunged under the Trump administration, a number of State Department lawyers used the dissent channel to criticize an agreement between the U.S. and the government of Guatemala that declared Guatemala (which has among the world's highest rates of violence) as a "safe third country" for Central American migrants. The State Department's internal dissenters argue that the agreement violates U.S. asylum law.
- In January 2021, two dissent cables were signed in response to President Trump's actions related to the 2021 storming of the United States Capitol and attack upon Congress on January 6, 2021. The cables criticized Secretary of State Mike Pompeo for “failure to issue a statement unequivocally acknowledging that President-Elect Biden won the 2020 election” and protested the “President’s incitement of insurrectionist violence against the United States.” The first cable questioned the State Department's 'gag order' on public messaging from diplomats about President Trump's involvement in the attack. The second cable called upon Pompeo to support consultations regarding invoking the 25th amendment to remove President Trump from office.
- On July 13, 2021, U.S. diplomats at the embassy in Kabul warned in a classified dissent cable to Secretary of State Antony Blinken and the department's leadership that the Afghan government was at risk of collapse, as reported by ABC News. The Afghan government collapsed on August 14, 2021

== Public disclosure of dissent cables ==
Dissent cables are intended to be internal and not immediately made public, although leaks do occur. Some dissent cables are marked as sensitive but unclassified. Wayne Merry, a former U.S. diplomat who wrote a dissent cable in 1994 while posted to Russia, made a Freedom of Information Act (FOIA) request in 1999 for a copy of his own cable; the State Department denied the request in 2003 on the grounds that (1) "release and public circulation of Dissent Channel messages, even as in your case to the drafter of the message, would inhibit the willingness of Department personnel to avail themselves of the Dissent Channel to express their views freely" and (2) "Dissent Channel messages are deliberative, pre-decisional and constitute intra-agency communications."

The National Security Archive at George Washington University has used FOIA to obtain dissent cables. The archive's requests to the State Department for cables from the 1970s and the 1980s were initially denied, with the department citing FOIA Exemption 5, which allows agencies to refuse FOIA requests for "predecisional" documents. However, the FOIA Improvement Act of 2016 prohibited agencies from using this exemption for documents more than 25 years old. As a result, the Archive re-requested the dissent cables, and following a lawsuit, the State Department began turning them over to the Archives. In 2018, the Archives publicly posted the dissent cables that it had received, along with responses by the State Department Policy Planning Staff, including Anthony Lake, Warren Christopher, and Paul Wolfowitz.

== Constructive Dissent Award ==
Foreign service members who make constructive use of the Dissent Channel may be eligible to receive the American Foreign Service Association's Constructive Dissent Awards (although use of the channel is not required to be eligible).

== Similar mechanisms ==
USAID also has a similar channel, the Direct Channel, established in 2011. Unlike the Dissent Channel, this is open to foreign national employees of USAID, and contractors. Several science-oriented federal agencies also have dissent channels: the Nuclear Regulatory Commission (the "Differing Professional Opinion" established after the Three Mile Island accident), the U.S. Department of Energy (process created in 2005), NASA (process created after the 2003 Space Shuttle Columbia disaster), and the U.S. Food and Drug Administration Center for Drug Evaluation and Research (process created in 2004 and revised in 2010).

The Central Intelligence Agency has "red teams" of intelligence officers and analysts "dedicated to arguing against the intelligence community's conventional wisdom and spotting flaws in logic and analysis." Neal Katyal writes that the State Department's Dissent Channel is analogous, and argues that the federal government needs more such intra-agency checks in order to institutionalize the practice of dissent.

== In popular culture ==
In season four of The Diplomat, released on Netflix in October 2026, the deputy chief of the US mission in the UK Stuart Hayford writes a cable to the dissent channel to share his objection to President Grace Penn's decision to send warships into British territory. Penn retaliates by recalling Hayford back to the USA, which leads to the US ambassador to the UK Kate Wyler resigning in protest during a G7 meeting.
