= Tracey Ann Jacobson =

American diplomat

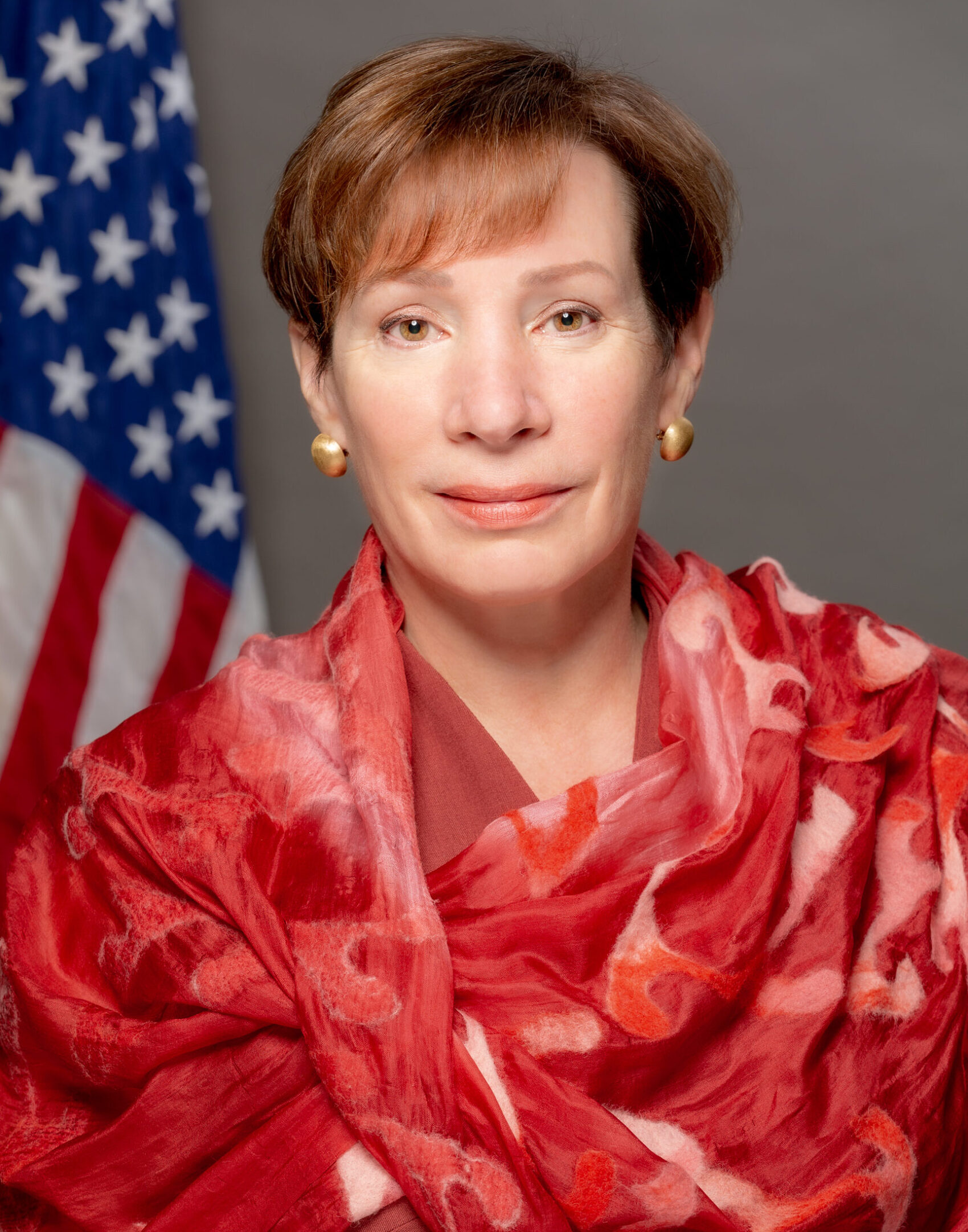

Chargé d’affaires ad interim to Bangladesh
- In office January 11, 2025 – January 2, 2026
- President: Joe Biden; Donald Trump
- Preceded by: Megan Bouldin (Chargé d’affaires)
- Succeeded by: Brent T. Christensen (Ambassador)

Assistant Secretary of State for International Organization Affairs
- Acting
- In office January 20, 2017 – October 2017
- President: Donald Trump
- Preceded by: Bathsheba Crocker
- Succeeded by: Mary Catherine Phee

United States Ambassador to Kosovo
- In office April 2, 2012 – July 10, 2015
- President: Barack Obama
- Deputy: Jennifer Bachus
- Preceded by: Christopher Dell
- Succeeded by: Greg Delawie

United States Ambassador to Tajikistan
- In office September 4, 2006 – July 27, 2009
- President: George W. Bush; Barack Obama
- Preceded by: Richard E. Hoagland
- Succeeded by: Kenneth E. Gross Jr.

United States Ambassador to Turkmenistan
- In office August 25, 2003 – July 14, 2006
- President: George W. Bush
- Preceded by: Laura E. Kennedy
- Succeeded by: Robert E. Patterson Jr.

Personal details
- Born: 1965 (age 60–61)
- Education: Johns Hopkins University (BA, MA)
- Tracey Ann Jacobson's voice Tracey Ann Jacobson speaks of sexual abuse among UN Peacekeepers; Recorded April 13, 2016

Tracey Ann Jacobson (born 1965) is an American diplomat who had served as the chargé d'affaires of the U.S Embassy in Dhaka. She formerly served as the United States ambassador to Turkmenistan, Tajikistan, Kosovo and Ethiopia. She also served as the Acting Assistant Secretary of State for International Organization Affairs from January 2017 through October 2017. She retired then returned to active duty in 2021 as the State Department's Director of the Afghanistan Task Force, and then as Chargé d’Affaires, ad interim, at the Embassy in Addis Ababa, Ethiopia. In January 2024, she was nominated by President Joe Biden to serve as the United States ambassador to Iraq. She joined the U.S Embassy in Dhaka as the chargé d'affaires in January 2025.

== Education ==
Jacobson received her Bachelor of Arts from Johns Hopkins University, and her Master of Arts from the Johns Hopkins University Paul H. Nitze School of Advanced International Studies. Jacobson has studied Albanian, Serbian, French, Russian, Spanish, Korean, and Tajik.

== Career ==
Jacobson served as Deputy Executive Secretary at the National Security Council at the White House, where she facilitated the development of foreign policy initiatives for the National Security Advisor and the President.

Jacobson is a career member of the United States Foreign Service and served overseas in Seoul, South Korea, Nassau, Bahamas, and Moscow, Russia. Her domestic assignments included the Bureau of Intelligence and Research, the Bureau of Western Hemisphere Affairs, and the Office of the Under Secretary for Management. She also served as the Deputy Director of the State Department's Foreign Service Institute.

Jacobson served as Deputy Chief of Mission at the U.S. Embassy in Riga, Latvia, as the U.S. Ambassador to Turkmenistan (August 2003-July 2006), and as the United States Ambassador to Tajikistan from August 2006 until resigning from that position in August 2009 (replaced by Kenneth E. Gross Jr. as of 12 August 2009). From 2012 to 2015, Jacobson served as the U.S. Ambassador to Kosovo.

From 2015 to 2017, Jacobson served as the principal deputy assistant secretary of the Bureau of International Organization Affairs. After the resignation of Assistant Secretary of State for International Organization Affairs Bathsheba N. Crocker in January 2017, Jacobson served as Acting Assistant Secretary until her retirement in October 2017.

Jacobson returned to the Department of State in 2021 as a senior advisor, first serving as the State Department's Director of the Afghanistan Task Force. From February 25, 2022 to September 25, 2023, she had served as Chargé d’Affaires, ad interim, at the Embassy in Addis Ababa, Ethiopia.

On January 25, 2024, President Joe Biden nominated Jacobson to serve as the United States ambassador to Iraq. Her nomination is pending before the Senate Foreign Relations Committee. On June 13, 2024, a hearing on her nomination was held before the Senate Foreign Relations Committee.

On January 11, 2025, she joined U.S. Embassy Dhaka as Chargé d’affaires ad interim.

== Personal life ==
Jacobson is married to David Baugh, a member of the British Diplomatic Service.

Diplomatic posts
Preceded by Laura E. Kennedy	United States Ambassador to Turkmenistan; 2003–2006	Succeeded by Robert E. Patterson Jr.
Preceded by Richard E. Hoagland	United States Ambassador to Tajikistan; 2006–2009	Succeeded by Kenneth E. Gross Jr.
Preceded by Christopher Dell	United States Ambassador to Kosovo; 2012–2015	Succeeded by Greg Delawie
