= Philip S. Kosnett =

American diplomat

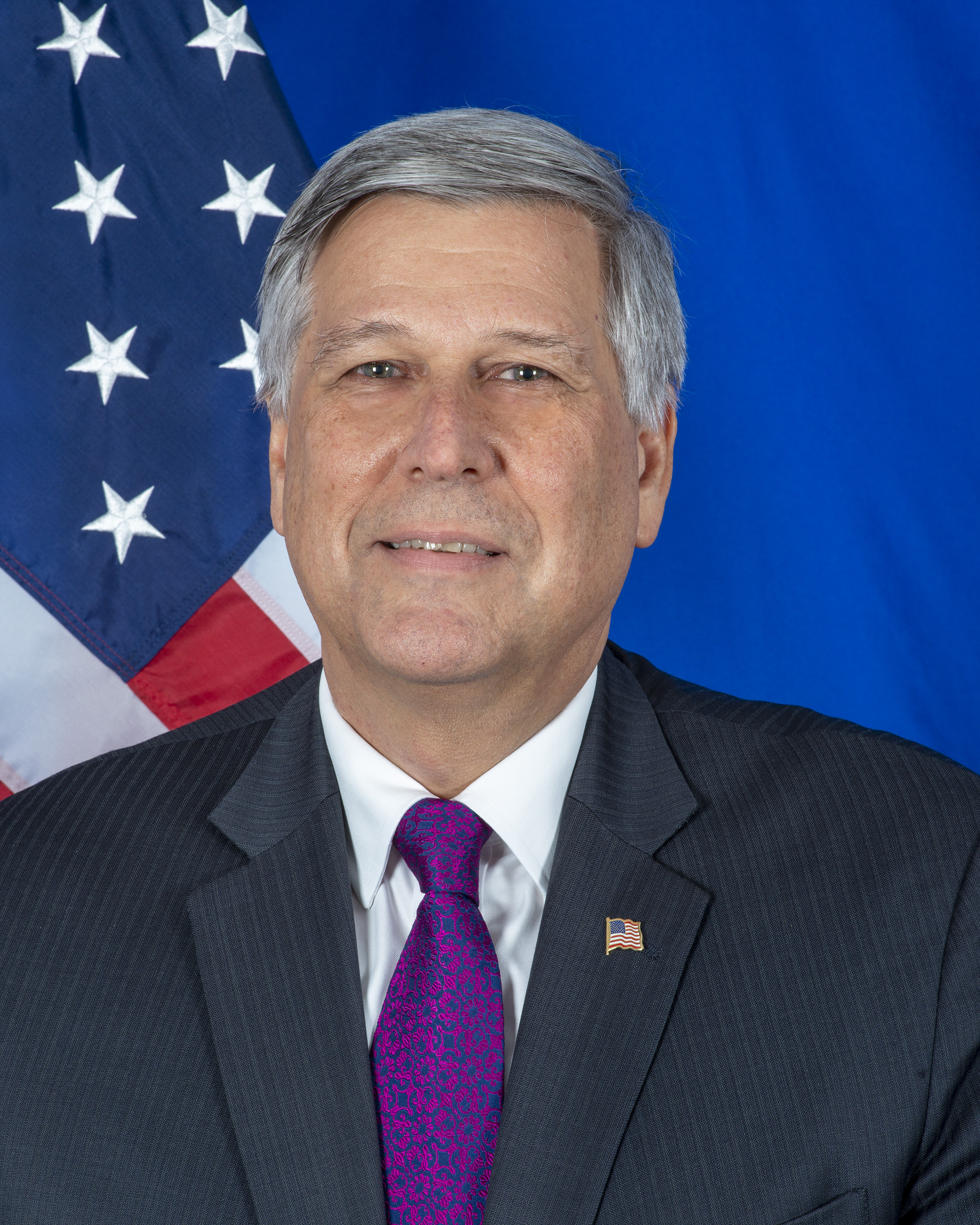

5th United States Ambassador to Kosovo
- In office December 3, 2018 – September 17, 2021
- President: Donald Trump; Joe Biden
- Preceded by: Greg Delawie
- Succeeded by: Jeff Hovenier

Personal details
- Spouse: Alison Kosnett
- Children: 2
- Education: Harvard University (AB)
- Occupation: American diplomat, Chargé d'Affaires ad interim at the United States Embassy in Ankara, Turkey, Ambassador to the Republic of Kosovo

Philip Scott Kosnett is a former American diplomat. He was sworn in as the fifth U.S. Ambassador to the Republic of Kosovo on November 27, 2018. Kosnett's previous assignment was as Chargé d'Affaires ad interim at the United States Embassy in Ankara, Turkey. Kosnett was nominated in July 2018 by U.S. president Trump to be the next ambassador to the Republic of Kosovo. The Senate confirmed him in this position in September 2018. Kosnett arrived in Kosovo in December 2018 and departed post in September 2021, retiring from government service later that year.

== Early life and education ==
Kosnett grew up in New Jersey and Illinois and graduated with an Artium Baccalaureus (Bachelor of Arts) in Government from Harvard University in 1982.

== Career ==
Kosnett worked as a game designer during his enrollment in high school and college, primarily for the company Simulations Publications, Inc. in New York. After graduating from Harvard University he worked as a teacher in Japan. He then launched a career in the Foreign Service, with his first assignment in Ankara, Turkey, serving as a political and consular officer. Following his initial assignment, he then served at eight different United States Missions in Europe, Asia, and the Middle East and in senior leadership positions at the Department of State. The positions included Deputy Chief of Mission and Chargé d'Affaires of the U.S. Embassy in Reykjavík, Iceland, and Deputy Chief of Mission at the Embassy in Tashkent, Uzbekistan. He also served in other political, political-military, and economic-commercial positions at the US missions in Afghanistan, Iraq, Kosovo, the Netherlands, and Japan.

In Washington, Kosnett served in the State Department's bureaus of European Affairs, Counterterrorism, Political-Military Affairs, and Intelligence & Research and also worked in the 24-hour Operations Center.

Before beginning his assignment in Turkey, Kosnett served as Director of the State Department Office of Southern European Affairs and was responsible for U.S. relations with Turkey, Greece, and Cyprus.

=== Diplomatic Service in Turkey ===
In July 2016, Kosnett began working at the U.S. Embassy in Ankara, Turkey, initially as the Deputy Chief of Mission. He then assumed the duties of Chargé d’Affaires on October 15, 2017, after former ambassador John R. Bass finished his assignment.

=== United States Ambassador to Kosovo ===
In July 2018, Kosnett was nominated by the U.S. president to be the next ambassador to Kosovo. Kosnett succeeded Greg Delawie, who was U.S. Ambassador to Kosovo 2015–2018. Kosnett's nomination was confirmed in September 2018 by the Senate.

=== Post-Government Career ===
After retiring from federal service in 2021, Kosnett and his wife Alison Kosnett established a consultancy. Philip Kosnett is also affiliated with the Center for European Political Analysis, the Joint Forces Staff College of National Defense University, and the Global and National Security Institute of the University of South Florida as a Senior Fellow, and the humanitarian organization AfghanEvac as an Advisor. He is also an elected member of the American Academy of Diplomacy. He is the editor of the book Boots and Suits: Historical Cases and Contemporary Lessons in Military Diplomacy (Marine Corps University Press, 2023).

== Award ==
Kosnett is the recipient of over 10 Department of State awards, including the State Department Superior Honor and Meritorious Honor Awards. He was also awarded the Medal for Exceptional Civilian Service by the Office of the Secretary of Defense, and the Army Army Medal for Outstanding Civilian Service. He was awarded the Kosovo Order of Dr. Ibrahim Rugova by President Vjosa Osmani.

== Personal life ==
Kosnett is married to Alison Kosnett, an international business and development consultant. They have 2 children: Alex, an environmental planner, and Nicole, a social media producer and artist. Kosnett has formally studied Turkish, Russian, Dutch, and Japanese.
