= Nicholas Dean (diplomat) =

American diplomat

United States Ambassador to Bangladesh
- In office June 17, 2011 – November 24, 2011
- President: Barack Obama
- Preceded by: James F. Moriarty
- Succeeded by: Dan Mozena

Personal details
- Education: University of Virginia

Nicholas Dean is an American diplomat and former Ambassador to Bangladesh. He also served as the state department's special envoy for Holocaust.

== Early life ==
Dean earned a B.A. in history from the University of Virginia and pursued graduate studies there as well.

== Career ==
Dean served in the United States Embassy in Georgia as the acting deputy chief of mission and political-economic counselor. He was the energy officer at the United States Embassy in Russia. He served in the United States Embassy in Australia as the commercial office. He also served as the German desk officer at the State Department in Washington D.C., and as the principal staff officer in Leipzig, Germany. In September 2003, he was appointed deputy director of the State Department's Office of India, Nepal, Sri Lanka, Maldives and Bhutan Affairs. In 2011, he served as the chargé d'affaires of the US embassy to Bangladesh based in Dhaka. As the head of the US mission to Bangladesh, he called on the Bangladesh government to deploy troops to Afghanistan.

Dean served as the special envoy for Holocaust issues under President Barack Obama. He also served as the director of Australia, New Zealand and Pacific Island affairs in the Bureau of East Asia and Pacific Affairs of the U.S. Department of State. Additionally, he served in the White House as the senior director for South Asia of National Security Staff.

== Personal life ==
Dean is married to a fellow Foreign Service officer.

Diplomatic posts
Preceded by James F. Moriarty	United States Ambassador to Bangladesh; 2011–2011	Succeeded by Dan Mozena
