= Vlora Çitaku =

Kosovar diplomat

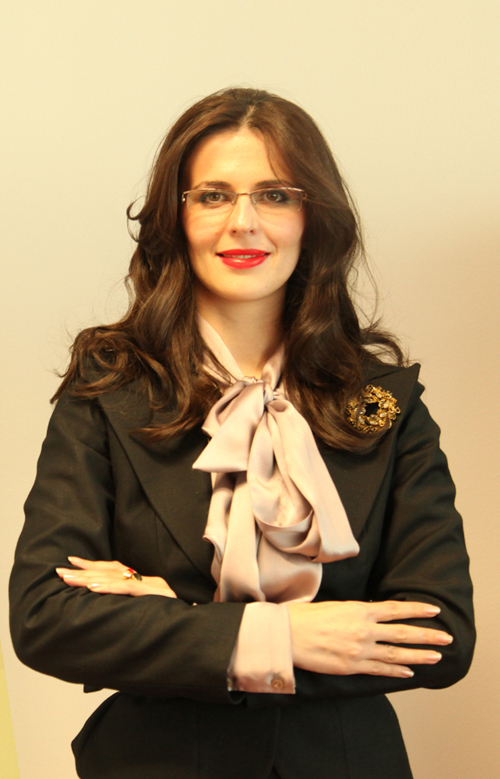

Leader of the Opposition
- Incumbent
- Assumed office 21 October 2026
- Preceded by: Bedri Hamza

Deputy Speaker of the Assembly of Kosovo
- Incumbent
- Assumed office 26 August 2025
- Preceded by: Enver Hoxhaj

Ambassador of Kosovo to United States
- In office 20 August 2015 – 3 March 2021
- President: Atifete Jahjaga; Hashim Thaçi; Vjosa Osmani (Acting)
- Prime Minister: Isa Mustafa; Ramush Haradinaj; Albin Kurti; Avdullah Hoti
- Preceded by: Akan Ismaili
- Succeeded by: Valdet Sadiku (chargé d'affaires); Ilir Dugolli

Minister for European Integration
- In office 22 February 2011 – 1 September 2014
- President: Atifete Jahjaga
- Prime Minister: Hashim Thaçi
- Preceded by: Besim Beqaj
- Succeeded by: Bekim Çollaku

Personal details
- Born: 10 October 1980 (age 46) Podujevo, SAP Kosovo, SR Serbia, SFR Yugoslavia

Vlora Çitaku (born 10 October 1980) is a Kosovar Albanian politician and diplomat who served as the Ambassador of Kosovo to the United States. She formerly served as Consul General of Kosovo in New York.

Before joining Kosovo's diplomatic corps, Vlora served as Minister for European Integration of Kosovo. She was noted as one of the most successful ministers of the 2011-2014 Kosovo government. She relinquished her MP seat in the Kosovo Assembly upon taking the governmental position, which she won as one of the top three most voted candidates.

== Career ==
Vlora Çitaku was only a teen when she became interpreter and a stringer for major Western news outlets at the onset of Kosovo war. She later became a refugee during the Kosovo War and has been involved with politics since 1999. She initially became spokesperson for the KLA and joined the PDK after the formation of the party in the post-war Kosovo. She was a Member of Parliament in two mandates. She states that she has overcome the stereotypes in politics that one must be old and a man.

She was the acting Minister of Foreign Affairs between 18 October 2010 and 22 February 2011.

== Controversy ==
At the 15th anniversary of the start of the NATO bombing of Yugoslavia, Çitaku posted an image on Twitter that provoked political controversy. She replaced the well known slogan for Nike, “Just Do It”, with the words, “NATO Air Just Do It” – with a warplane next to it. Serbia's Ministry of Foreign Affairs called the gesture disrespectful to Serbs civilians killed by NATO air strikes. Analysts also considered it in bad taste. Nike, Inc. also said that the image "did not represent their officials stand" - and that company was in no way involved in posting the tweet or in creating the image.
