= Edmund DeJarnette =

American diplomat (1938–2015)

1st United States Ambassador to Angola
- In office July 14, 1994 – July 24, 1995
- Preceded by: Position established
- Succeeded by: Donald Steinberg

Personal details
- Born: January 15, 1938
- Died: April 6, 2015 (aged 77)
- Education: University of Virginia; George Washington University

Edmund Tompkins DeJarnette, Jr. (January 15, 1938 – April 6, 2015) was an American diplomat. A career Foreign Service Officer, he held a variety of ambassadorships. He was the American Ambassador Extraordinary and Plenipotentiary to the Central African Republic (1983-1986), Tanzania (1990-1992) and was Director in Angola from 1992 until he was promoted to Ambassador in 1994. He was the first U.S. Ambassador to Angola and served until 1995.

DeJarnette was born on January 15, 1938. A native of Richmond, Virginia, he graduated from the University of Virginia Law School in 1963. (He also has a bachelor's degree in English from U.Va. and a master's degree in public administration from George Washington University. He entered the Foreign Services the following year based on a recommendation from the school's placement office. For a few years, he worked for the Peace Corps - from 1970 to 1975 he was the director in Quito, Ecuador, and deputy director for Latin America.

Both Tanzania and Angola were fighting civil wars during his time there. The U.S. did not recognize the Marxist government that emerged in Angola and he was there for two years before he was sworn in as Ambassador after the US recognized the government in 1993. There was concern about kidnapping of the staff as well as the constant shelling in the area of the embassy until the Angolan government rescued DeJarnette and the rest of his staff with armored vehicles and tanks.

DeJarnette was the head of the U.S. delegation in the talks that led to the 1994 peace agreement. When he retired from the Foreign Service, he moved to Ashland, Virginia and began practicing law in Richmond.

DeJarnette founded the U.S.-Africa Energy Association which ultimately led to his founding SonAir USA in 2009. He served as its CEO and President until 2012. DeJarnette died on April 6, 2015, at the age of 77. He was buried in Hollywood Cemetery.
