= Embassy of Kosovo, Washington, D.C. =

Diplomatic mission in the United States

Ambassador of Kosovo to the United States
- Ambasadori i Kosovës në Shteteve të Bashkuara
- Coat of arms of Kosovo

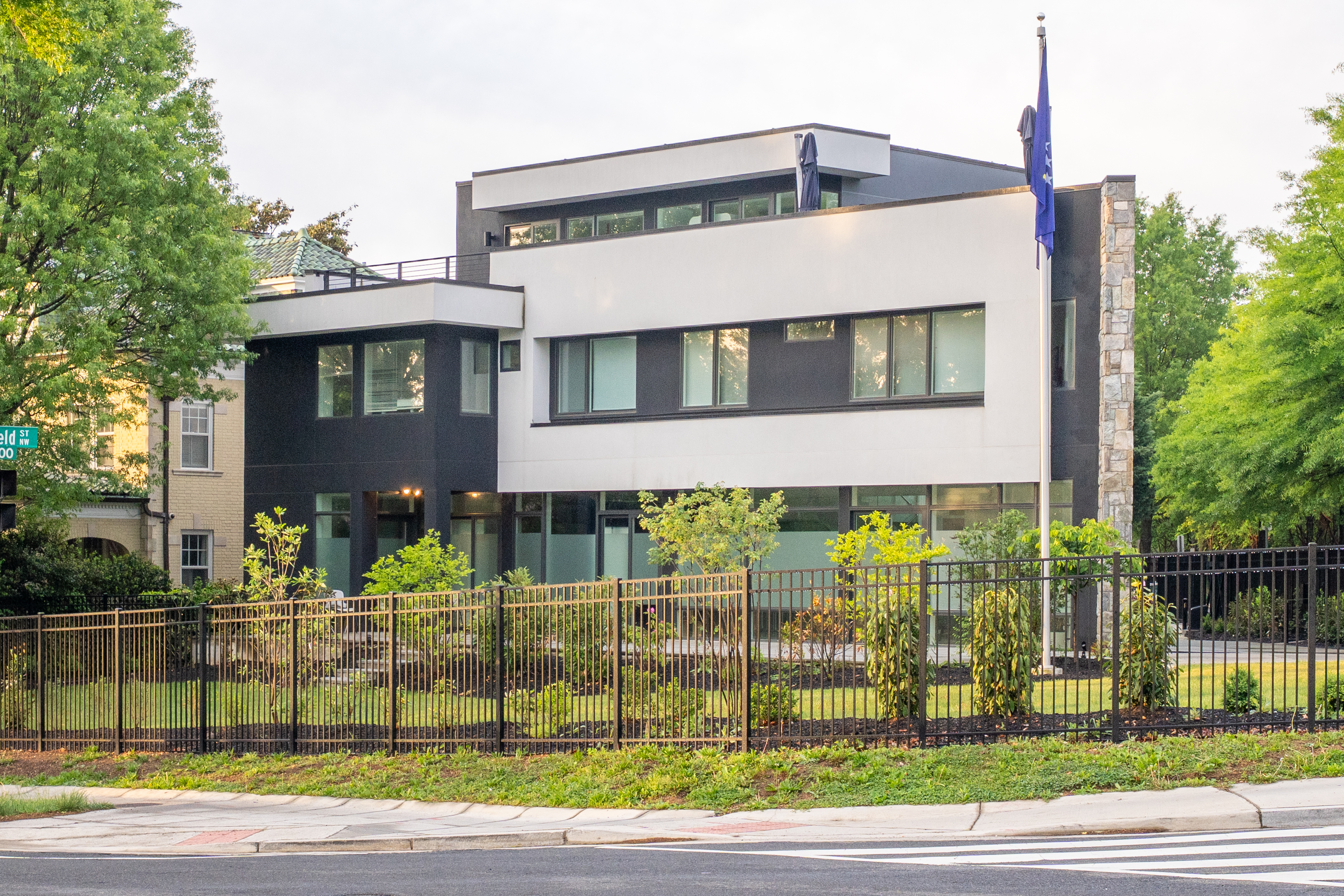
- Incumbent; Ilir Dugolli since November 30, 2021
- Residence: Washington, D.C., United States
- Nominator: President of Kosovo
- Inaugural holder: Avni Spahiu
- Formation: February 26, 2008
- Website: Kosovo Embassy - Washington, D.C.

The Embassy of Kosovo in Washington, D.C. is the main diplomatic mission of Kosovo to the United States.

The embassy is currently located at 3612 Massachusetts Avenue, NW, Washington, D.C. The embassy was established in October 2008.The first chancery was in Georgetown, and then at 2175 K Street, NW Suite 300 until moving to the present location in May 2023.

The current ambassador is Ilir Dugolli, who is the highest-ranking representative of Kosovo to the U.S. government. He succeeded Vlora Çitaku, who served in that position in the period between September 17, 2015 to March 3, 2021. The first Ambassador of Kosovo in Washington, DC was Avni Spahiu.

The Embassy represents the Republic of Kosovo in the United States of America. The mission is to promote political, economic and cultural relations with the United States, as well as to contribute to further strengthening of the U.S. and Kosovo relations.

The embassy is supported by a consulate general in New York located at 801 Second Avenue, Suite 405 New York.

== List of representatives ==
Diplomatic accreditation	Ambassador	Prime Minister of Kosovo	List of presidents of the United States	Term end
February 26, 2008	Avni Spahiu	Hashim Thaçi	George W. Bush; Barack Obama	May 2, 2012
May 2, 2012	Akan Ismaili	Hashim Thaçi	Barack Obama	September 17, 2015
September 17, 2015	Vlora Çitaku	Isa Mustafa	Barack Obama; Donald Trump; Joe Biden	March 3, 2021
March 8, 2021	Valdet Sadiku; Chargé d'affaires	Avdullah Hoti	Joe Biden	November 28, 2021
November 30, 2021	Ilir Dugolli	Albin Kurti	Joe Biden; Donald Trump	

== See also ==
- List of diplomatic missions of Kosovo
- Foreign relations of Kosovo
- Kosovo–United States relations
- List of diplomatic missions in the United States
- List of diplomatic missions in Washington, D.C.
