= Dan Mozena =

American diplomat

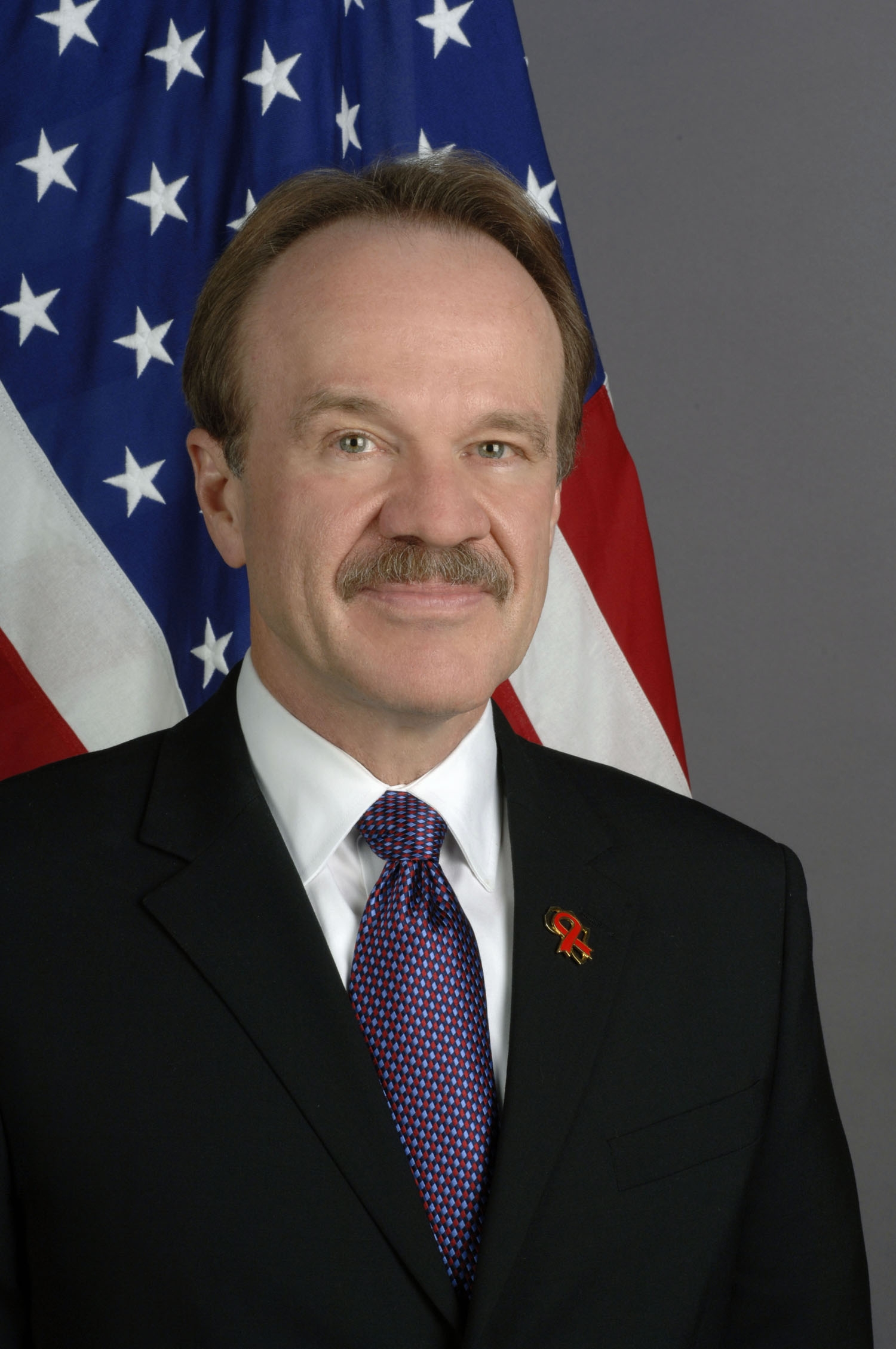

United States Ambassador to Bangladesh
- In office November 24, 2011 – January 12, 2015
- President: Barack Obama
- Preceded by: Nicholas Dean
- Succeeded by: Marcia Bernicat

6th United States Ambassador to Angola
- In office November 19, 2007 – July 3, 2010
- President: George W. Bush; Barack Obama
- Preceded by: Cynthia G. Efird
- Succeeded by: Christopher McMullen

Personal details
- Born: May 1, 1949 (age 77) Dubuque, Iowa, U.S.
- Spouse: Grace Feeney
- Children: 2
- Parent(s): Kenneth; Edna
- Education: Iowa State University (BS); University of Wisconsin (MA, MPA)
- Profession: Diplomat, Career Ambassador

Dan Mozena (born May 1, 1949 in Dubuque, Iowa) is a United States Foreign Service Officer and a member of the Senior Foreign Service. He served as the United States Ambassador to Angola from 2007–2010 and as United States Ambassador to Bangladesh from 2011–2015.

== Education and early career ==
Mozena graduated from Iowa State University in 1970 with a Bachelor of Science degree in history and government. He participated in a cultural exchange program to Nepal under the auspices of the National 4-H Council from 1970 to 1971. From 1971 to 1974, Mozena attended graduate school at the University of Wisconsin-Madison. He graduated in 1974 with a Master of Arts degree in political science and a Master of Public Administration degree. From 1974 to 1976, Mozena was a Peace Corps volunteer in Zaire. Before joining the Foreign Service, Mozena worked as a program specialist from 1977 to 1981 for the National 4-H Council in Chevy Chase, Maryland.

== Foreign Service career ==
Ambassador Mozena joined the U.S. Foreign Service as a Political Officer in 1981.

- 1982 - 1983: Consular Officer, U.S. Embassy, Lusaka, Zambia
- 1983 - 1985: Economic Officer and Political Officer, U.S. Embassy, Kinshasa, Zaire
- 1985 - 1988: Public Diplomacy Officer, Office of Strategic Nuclear Policy, Political-Military Bureau, Dept. of State
- 1988 - 1989: Hindi language study, Foreign Service Institute
- 1989 - 1992: Deputy Counselor for Political Affairs, U.S. Embassy, New Delhi, India
- 1992 - 1993: Officer-in-Charge, South African Affairs, Dept. of State
- 1993 - 1995: Deputy Director, Office of Southern African Affairs, Dept. of State
- 1995 - 1998: Deputy Counselor for Political Affairs, U.S. Embassy, Islamabad, Pakistan
- 1998 - 2001: Counselor for Political and Economic Affairs, U.S. Embassy, Dhaka, Bangladesh
- 2001 - 2004: Deputy Chief of Mission, U.S. Embassy, Lusaka, Zambia
- 2004 - 2007: Director, Office of Southern African Affairs, Dept of State, Washington
- 2007 - 2010: U.S. Ambassador to Angola, Luanda, Angola
- 2010 - 2011: Professor of National Security, National War College, Washington
- 2011 - 2014: U.S. Ambassador to Bangladesh, Dhaka, Bangladesh

== Family ==
Mozena is the second of four sons and one daughter of Kenneth and Edna Mozena. In 1971, Mozena married Grace Feeney. They have two children: Anne (1979) and Mark (1983).

Diplomatic posts
Preceded by Cynthia G. Efird	United States Ambassador to Angola; 2007–2010	Succeeded by Christopher J. McMullen
Preceded by Nicholas Dean	United States Ambassador to Bangladesh; 2011–2015	Succeeded by Marcia Bernicat
