= Donald Steinberg =

American diplomat (born 1953)

2nd United States Ambassador to Angola
- In office September 15, 1995 – November 6, 1998
- President: Bill Clinton
- Preceded by: Edmund DeJarnette
- Succeeded by: Joseph Sullivan

Personal details
- Born: March 25, 1953 (age 73) Los Angeles, California
- Education: Reed College; Columbia University; University of Toronto

Donald K. Steinberg (born March 25, 1953) is an American diplomat who was the U.S. ambassador to Angola. He is also the former president and CEO of World Learning.

== Early life and education ==
Steinberg was born in Los Angeles, California on March 25, 1953. He received a master's degrees in journalism from Columbia University and economic development from the University of Toronto, as well as a bachelor's degree in economics from Reed College.

== Career ==
Steinberg worked for more than forty years in government, as well as non-governmental organizations (NGOs). Before he worked at World Learning, he was deputy administrator at the United States Agency for International Development (USAID). Other jobs for the US government include director of the US Department of State's Joint Policy Council, White House deputy press secretary, and National Security Council senior director for African Affairs. Other positions include being deputy president for policy at the International Crisis Group, a Randolph Jennings senior fellow at the US Institute of Peace, and advisor to the Women's Refugee Commission, the UN Development Fund for Women, the UN Civil Society Advisory Group for Women, Peace and Security, and the Institute for Inclusive Security.

When he arrived as U.S. Ambassador to Angola in 1995, it was his opinion that the people working for the American oil companies “were, in fact, the American ambassadors to Angola in that period. ... The only real relationship was through the oil companies.”

In 1997, Steinberg sent a dissent cable (entitled "Dissent Against U.S. Positions on Landmines at Oslo APL Conference") that criticized a State Department instruction directing ambassadors in the developing world to press other governments to weaken anti-personnel landmine measures in the Ottawa Treaty (which was then under negotiation) by allowing "the United States and presumably other countries to exercise numerous waivers, exempt anti-tank weapons, exclude South Korea, and accept lengthy implementation timeframes." In his cable, Steinberg referred to the U.S. position as "indefensible, filled with contradictions, and inconsistent with true U.S. national security and foreign policy interests" and referred to the devastating effects of mines on civilian populations after the Angolan Civil War, writing, "How can America's global responsibilities and foreign policy interests dictate that we protect weapons so horrible and barbaric that virtually all our closest allies are seeking a global treaty to eliminate them without delay?" The cable was declassified in 2020, and Steinberg wrote an article regarding it in Just Security. He noted that the U.S. government conformed to the "basic precepts" of the Ottawa Convention from the time it came into force in 1999 until the Donald Trump administration reversed course in 2020, allowing the U.S. military to make greater use of such landmines; Steinberg called that move reckless and irresponsible.
