= Tina Kaidanow =

American diplomat (1965–2024)

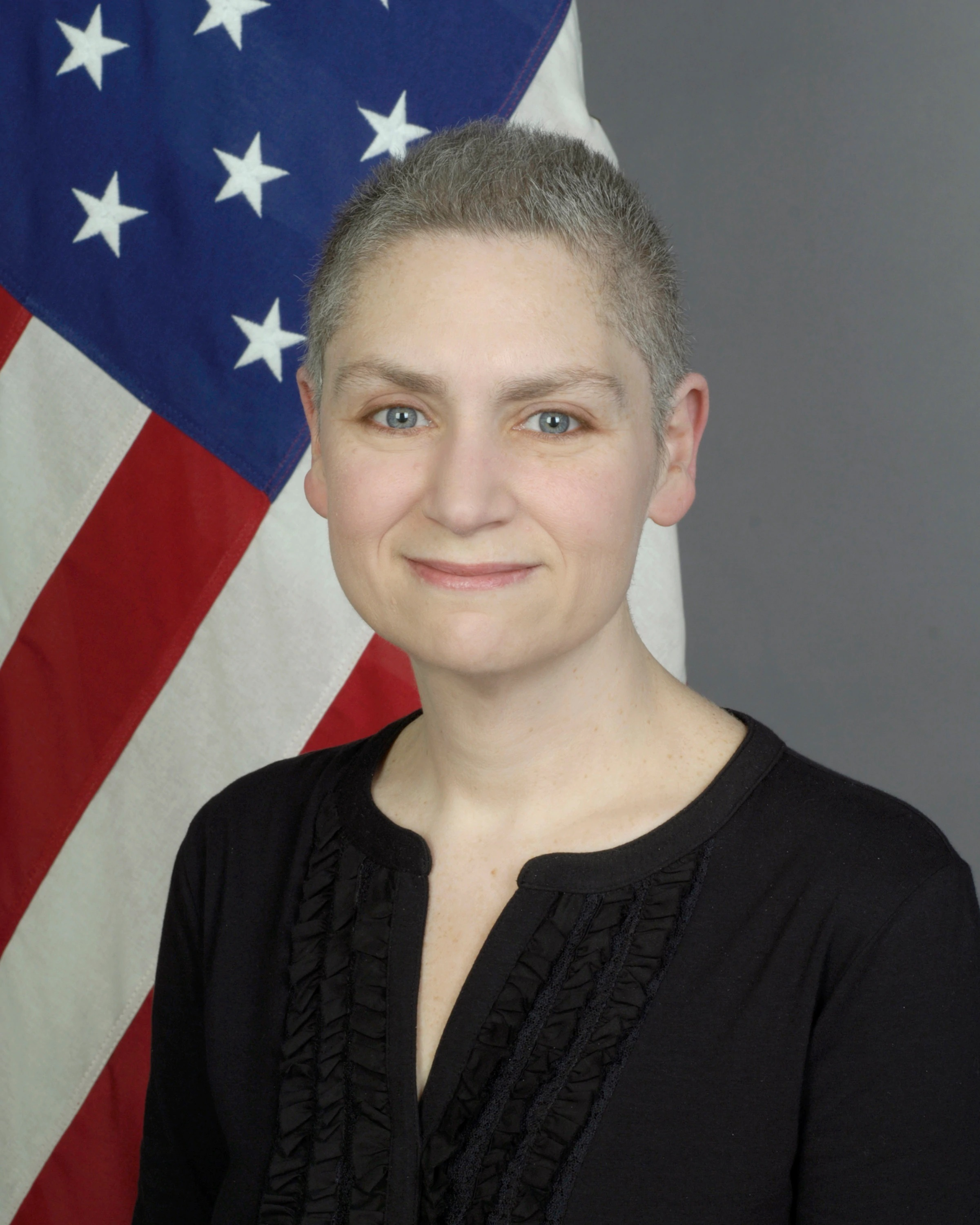
- Kaidanow in 2014

Senior Advisor for International Cooperation in the Office of the Under Secretary of Defense for Acquisition and Sustainment
- In office September 25, 2018 – December 16, 2019
- President: Donald Trump
- Preceded by: Keith Webster

17th Coordinator for Counterterrorism
- In office February 18, 2014 – February 22, 2016
- President: Barack Obama
- Preceded by: Daniel Benjamin
- Succeeded by: Nathan A. Sales

United States Ambassador to Kosovo
- In office April 8, 2008 – July 6, 2009; Acting: April 8 – July 25, 2008
- President: George W. Bush; Barack Obama
- Preceded by: Position established
- Succeeded by: Christopher Dell

Chief of Mission of the U.S. Office in Pristina
- In office July 4, 2006 – April 8, 2008
- President: George W. Bush
- Preceded by: Philip Goldberg
- Succeeded by: Position abolished

Personal details
- Born: June 3, 1965 Philadelphia, Pennsylvania, U.S.
- Died: October 16, 2024 (aged 59) Washington, D.C., U.S.
- Education: University of Pennsylvania (B.A., M.A.); Columbia University (M.A.)

Tina Susan Kaidanow (June 3, 1965 – October 16, 2024) was an American diplomat and government official. She served as the Acting Assistant Secretary of State for Political-Military Affairs before moving to the United States Department of Defense. From 2008 to 2009, Kaidanow served as United States Ambassador to Kosovo.

== Early life and education ==
Kaidanow was born on June 3, 1965, in Philadelphia, and was raised in Baltimore County, Maryland. She earned Bachelor of Arts and Master of Arts degrees from the University of Pennsylvania and another master's degree in political science from Columbia University in New York, as well as a certificate in Russian studies from the Harriman Institute at Columbia.

== Career ==
Kaidanow was a career member of the United States Foreign Service. She had assignments in Belgrade (1995–1997), Skopje (1998–1999), Sarajevo (1997–1998 and 2003–2006), Pristina (2006–2009), and Kabul (2012–2013), as well as the United States National Security Council and the Bureau of European and Eurasian Affairs (2009–2011). At the National Security Council, Kaidanow worked as Director for Southeast European Affairs.

In Skopje, from 1998 to 1999, Kaidanow served as a special assistant to United States Ambassador to Macedonia Christopher R. Hill. Kaidanow later became the Deputy Chief of Mission at the U.S. embassy in Sarajevo from 2003 to 2006.

In 2006, Kaidanow became the Chargée d'Affaires for the U.S. Office in Pristina. In 2008, the Republic of Kosovo declared independence from Serbia, and was subsequently recognized by the United States. The new U.S. embassy in Pristina opened, with Kaidanow as the first United States Ambassador to Kosovo.

From August 2009 to June 2011, Kaidanow served as a Deputy Assistant Secretary of State for European and Eurasian Affairs, and then served as the bureau's Principal Deputy Assistant Secretary until 2012. From September 2012 to October 2013, Kaidanow served as the DCM at the U.S. embassy in Kabul, Afghanistan. In this capacity, according to Politico, she vetoed a plan to prosecute Taliban commanders and their drug lord allies in U.S. courts for drug trafficking, because of concerns about the country's political stability.

Kaidanow served as the Coordinator for Counterterrorism from February 2014 to February 2016. In February 2016, Kaidanow moved to the Bureau of Political-Military Affairs as the Principal Deputy Assistant Secretary.

On September 25, 2018, Kaidanow was appointed a senior advisor for international cooperation in the Office of the Under Secretary of Defense for Acquisition and Sustainment. She resigned on December 16, 2019.

== Death ==
Kaidanow died from cardiac arrest at Georgetown University Hospital on October 16, 2024, at the age of 59. She was hospitalized for the previous three weeks due to internal bleeding.

Diplomatic posts
Preceded by Philip Goldberg	Chief of Mission of the U.S. Office in Pristina; July 2006 – April 8, 2008	Position abolished
New office	United States Ambassador to Kosovo; April 8, 2008 – July 6, 2009	Succeeded by Christopher Dell
Government offices
Preceded by Jerry Lanier; Acting	Coordinator for Counterterrorism; February 18, 2014 – February 22, 2016	Succeeded by Justin H. Siberell; Acting
Preceded by Puneet Talwar	Assistant Secretary of State for Political-Military Affairs; February 22, 2016 – September 2018	Succeeded by R. Clarke Cooper
Preceded by Keith Webster	Senior Advisor for International Cooperation in the Office of the Under Secretary of Defense for Acquisition and Sustainment; September 25, 2018 – December 16, 2019	Succeeded by TBD
