= List of ambassadors of the United States to Kosovo =

Ambassador of the United States to Kosovo
- Ambasadori i Shteteve të Bashkuara në Kosovë
- Seal of the United States Department of State

- Flag of a United States ambassador

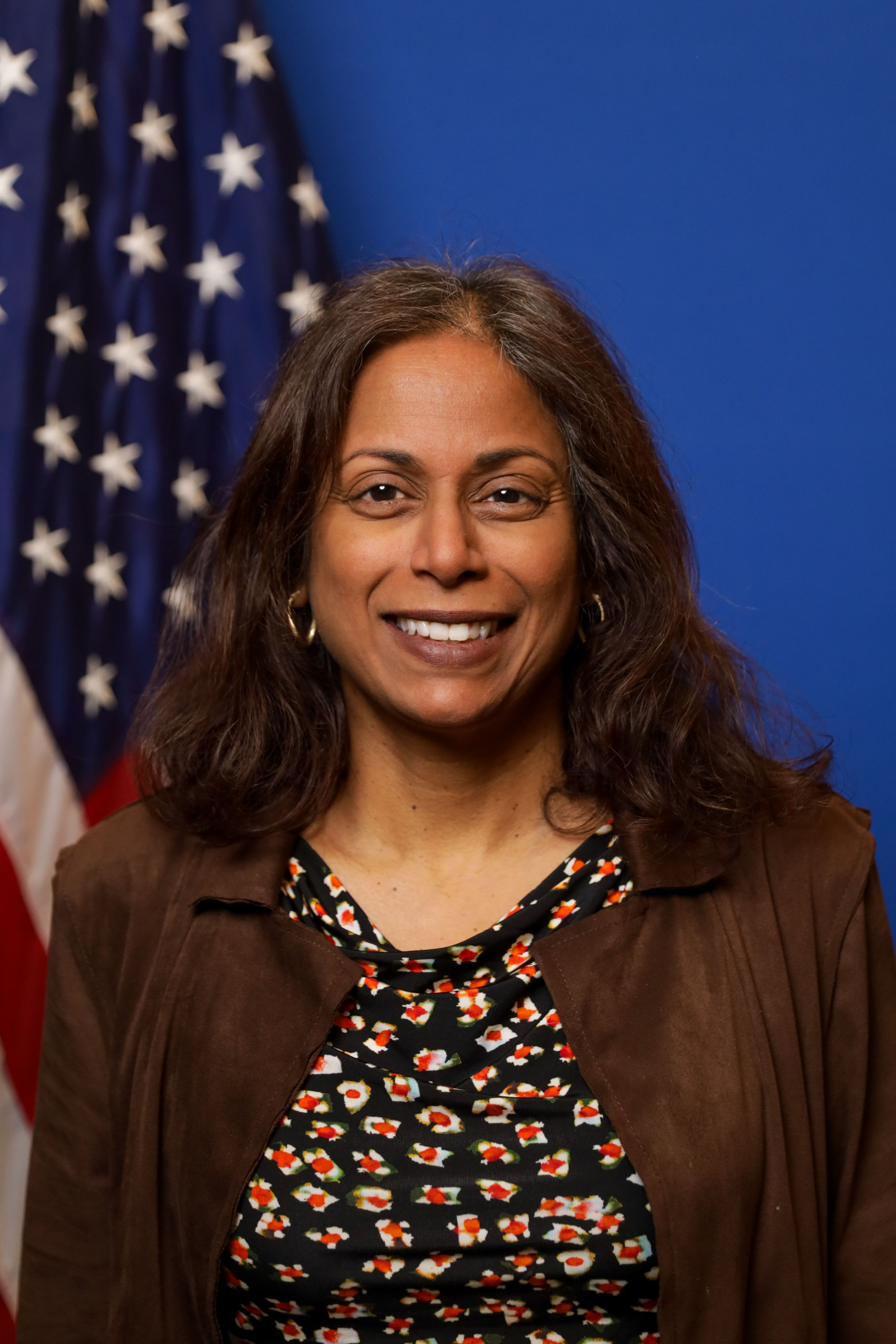
- Incumbent; Anu Prattipati; Chargé d'Affaires since December 30, 2024
- Residence: Pristina, Kosovo
- Nominator: The president of the United States
- Inaugural holder: Tina Kaidanow as Ambassador Extraordinary and Plenipotentiary
- Formation: July 18, 2008
- Website: U.S. Embassy - Pristina

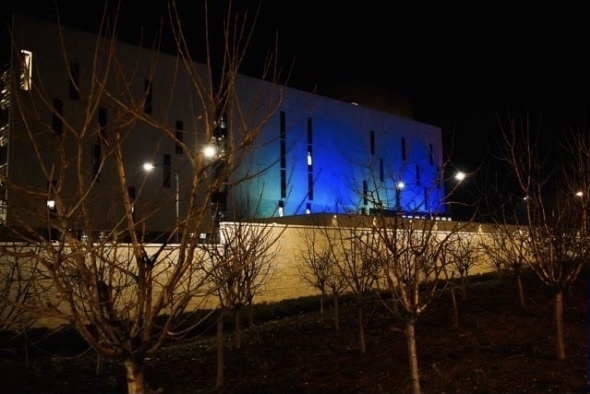
Embassy of the United States in Pristina, Kosovo

This is a list of ambassadors of the United States to Kosovo. The ambassador is the head of the Embassy of the United States in Pristina.

The formal title for ambassadors is Ambassador Extraordinary and Plenipotentiary. Heads of the U.S. Office that existed prior to U.S. recognition of Kosovo's independence and the opening of the U.S. Embassy in 2008 were titled Chief of Mission and were often of Ambassadorial rank. The ambassador to Kosovo must be confirmed by the Senate.

President Joe Biden nominated career U.S. diplomat and deputy chief of the U.S. Embassy in Ankara, Turkey Jeff Hovenier for the position on June 2, 2021. He was confirmed by the Senate on November 18, 2021.

== Ambassadors ==
#	Ambassador	Image	Career track	Appointed	Presented credentials	Terminated mission	President(s)
Chief of Mission
1	Reno L. Harnish		Career FSO	August 30, 2002		July 20, 2003	George W. Bush
2	Marcie Berman Ries		Career FSO	July 20, 2003		July 28, 2004	George W. Bush
3	Philip S. Goldberg		Career FSO	July 28, 2004		July 4, 2006	George W. Bush
4	Tina Kaidanow		Career FSO	July 4, 2006		April 8, 2008	George W. Bush
Chargé d'Affaires
4	Tina Kaidanow		Career FSO	April 8, 2008		July 18, 2008	George W. Bush
Ambassador Extraordinary and Plenipotentiary
4	Tina Kaidanow		Career FSO	July 18, 2008	July 25, 2008	July 6, 2009	George W. Bush
4	Tina Kaidanow		Career FSO	July 18, 2008	July 25, 2008	July 6, 2009	Barack Obama
5	Christopher Dell		Career FSO	May 27, 2009	July 31, 2009	August 9, 2012	Barack Obama
6	Tracey Ann Jacobson		Career FSO	April 2, 2012	August 16, 2012	July 10, 2015	Barack Obama
7	Greg Delawie		Career FSO	June 29, 2015	August 21, 2015	September 26, 2018	Barack Obama
7	Greg Delawie		Career FSO	June 29, 2015	August 21, 2015	September 26, 2018	Donald Trump
8	Philip S. Kosnett		Career FSO	September 10, 2018	December 3, 2018	September 17, 2021	Donald Trump
8	Philip S. Kosnett		Career FSO	September 10, 2018	December 3, 2018	September 17, 2021	Joe Biden
9	Jeff Hovenier		Career FSO	November 18, 2021	January 10, 2022	December 30, 2024	Joe Biden

== See also ==
- Kosovo–United States relations
- Foreign relations of Kosovo
- Ambassadors of the United States
