= Head of mission =

Top diplomatic representative such as ambassador

In diplomatic usage, head of mission (HOM) or chief of mission (COM) from the French chef de mission diplomatique (CMD) is the head of a diplomatic representation, such as an ambassador, high commissioner, nuncio, chargé d'affaires, permanent representative, and sometimes to a consul-general. Depending on the context, it may also refer to the heads of certain international organizations' representative offices. Certain other titles or usages that would qualify as a head of mission or equivalent also exist. While they are primarily referred to by the other titles mentioned above, it is common for the diplomatic corps of a country to use deputy head of mission or deputy chief of mission (DCM) as the primary title for the second in command of a diplomatic mission.

In diplomatic missions and foreign services where ambassadors may be political appointees rather than career diplomats, the deputy chief of mission may be the senior career foreign service professional and generally understood to be more than a "deputy."

Heads of offices of international organizations below this diplomatic rank who are that organization's senior official in country, such as a project manager, and of private sector organizations and firms are commonly called "chiefs of party" to distinguish them from "chiefs of mission."

Chef de Mission is also the title of the team manager of a national delegation in major international multi-discipline sporting events, such as the Olympic Games.
