= Cynthia Efird =

American diplomat (born 1950)

Cynthia G. Efird
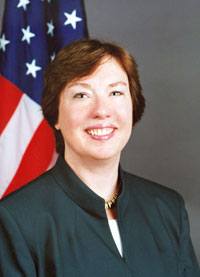

5th United States Ambassador to Angola
- In office August 31, 2004 – June 6, 2007
- President: George W. Bush
- Preceded by: Christopher W. Dell
- Succeeded by: Dan Mozena

Personal details
- Born: 1950 (age 75–76) Detroit, Michigan, U.S.
- Education: Georgetown University (BS); Duke University; National Defense University
- Profession: Diplomat

Cynthia Grissom Efird (born 1950) is an American diplomat and career foreign service officer who served as the United States Ambassador to Angola from 2004 to 2007. She was succeeded by Dan Mozena.

== Education ==
Efird went to the private Kingswood School in Bloomfield Hills, Michigan, and holds a Bachelor of Science in Foreign Service from the Edmund A. Walsh School of Foreign Service at Georgetown University and master's degrees from Duke University and the National War College of the National Defense University.

== Career ==
Efird joined the United States Foreign Service in 1977. She served with the U.S. embassies in Yugoslavia (1978–1982), the East Germany (1983–1985), and Mozambique (1988–1989). From 1989 until 1993 she was press officer for both the U.S. embassy and the U.S. Delegation to the Organization for Security and Co-operation in Europe (OSCE), and volunteered to serve the United Nations peacekeeping forces in Somalia. In 1997 she was appointed Deputy Counselor for Public Affairs in the US embassy in Moscow, Russia until 2000 when she returned to the OSCE to oversee the media sector in Kosovo on behalf of the UN.

She has also been Special Adviser to the Associate United States Trade Representative and immediately before her appointment as Ambassador to Angola, she was director of public affairs for the Bureau of African Affairs at the United States Department of State.

President George W. Bush appointed her to be the United States Ambassador to Angola. She served as ambassador from 2004 to 2007.

Diplomatic posts
Preceded by Christopher W. Dell	U.S. Ambassador to Angola; 2004–2007	Succeeded by Dan Mozena
