= List of ambassadors of Kosovo to the United States =

Coordinates: 38.902843°N 77.048431°W

Ambassador of Kosovo to the United States Embassy of Kosovo, Washington, D.C.
- Incumbent; Ilir Dugolli since November 30, 2021
- Inaugural holder: Avni Spahiu
- Formation: September 18, 2009

The Kosovar ambassador in Washington, D. C. is the official representative of the Government in Pristina to the Government of the United States.

== List of representatives ==
Diplomatic agrément	Diplomatic accreditation	Ambassador	Prime Minister of Kosovo	List of presidents of the United States	Term end
February 1, 2008	diplomatic relations established between the United States and the Republic of Kosovo		Hashim Thaçi	George W. Bush	February 18, 2008
November 4, 2009	May 2, 2009	Avni Spahiu	Hashim Thaçi	Barack Obama; Donald Trump	February 1, 2012
May 2, 2012	April 23, 2012	Akan Ismaili	Hashim Thaçi	Barack Obama; Donald Trump	August 17, 2015
September 17, 2015	August 27, 2015	Vlora Çitaku	Isa Mustafa	Barack Obama; Donald Trump	March 3, 2021
March 5, 2021	March 8, 2021	Valdet Sadiku; Chargé d'affaires	Avdullah Hoti	Joe Biden Donald Trump	November 28, 2021
November 29, 2021	November 30, 2021	Ilir Dugolli	Albin Kurti	Joe Biden Donald Trump	
