= United Nations Mission for Justice Support in Haiti =

Peacekeeping mission in Haiti

- Abbreviation: MINUJUSTH
- Formation: 13 April 2017
- Dissolved: 15 October 2019
- Type: Peacekeeping mission
- Legal status: Ended
- Headquarters: Port-au-Prince, Haiti
- Head: Helen La Lime
- Parent organization: United Nations Security Council
- Website: https://minujusth.unmissions.org/

The United Nations Mission for Justice Support in Haiti (MINUJUSTH) was a peacekeeping mission in Haiti mandated by the United Nations Security Council through Resolutions 2350 (2017) and 2410 (2018). It was the successor to MINUSTAH (the United Nations Stabilisation Mission in Haiti).

In April 2017, the Security Council unanimously agreed that the then 2,370 soldiers serving in United Nations Stabilisation Mission in Haiti (MINUSTAH) had to be gradually withdrawn until 15 October 2017 to make way for the new MINUJUSTH as the successor operation.

MINUJUSTH had up to 1,275 members of the police force as well as correction officers and international civilians, but no military personnel.

Two Indian units that served in MINUSTAH remained in Haiti to serve in MINUJUSTH, while the other unit returned to India.

The mission was mandated until 15 April 2018 then extended by one year with the passing of UN Security Council Resolution 2410.

On 25 June 2019, a new resolution was adopted by the Security Council that set MINUJUSTH's mandate to come to an end on 15 October 2019. The mission's end marked the conclusion of 15 years of UN peacekeeping operations in Haiti.

After the end of the mission, a new United Nations Integrated Office in Haiti (BINUH) was set to be created to coordinate all of the remaining projects, actions and funds of the United Nations in Haiti.

== See also ==
- United Nations Mission in Haiti
- List of UN peacekeeping missions
- List of countries where United Nations peacekeepers are currently deployed
