= Christopher McMullen =

American diplomat

Christopher J. McMullen
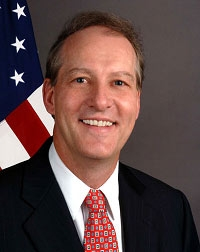

7th United States Ambassador in Angola
- In office March 3, 2011 – June 12, 2013
- President: Barack Obama
- Preceded by: Dan Mozena
- Succeeded by: Helen La Lime

Personal details
- Born: 1952 (age 73–74)
- Education: West Chester University; Georgetown University (PhD); National War College

Christopher J. McMullen (born 1952) is a career member of the Senior Foreign Service. He served as the United States Ambassador to Angola from October 2010 to June 12, 2013.

McMullen was raised in Pennsylvania and earned a bachelor's degree from West Chester University in 1974. He also received a master's degree in modern European history from West Chester University in 1976. McMullen graduated from Georgetown University with a PhD in Latin American history in 1980 as well as graduating from the National War College in 2001.

McMullen joined the foreign service in 1987 and went on to serve in Nicaragua, Malaysia, El Salvador, Tanzania, Columbia, Brazil, and Angola.

He was later employed at Georgetown teaching Latin American history which he also taught at George Mason University. He also worked in the office of Senator John Glenn (D-Ohio) as a foreign affairs fellow and was also a senior analyst for the Department of Defense. After leaving his post in Angola, McMullen taught at the National War College.
