= Greg Delawie =

United States diplomat

United States Ambassador to Kosovo
- In office August 21, 2015 – September 26, 2018
- President: Barack Obama; Donald Trump
- Deputy: Colleen Hyland
- Preceded by: Tracey Ann Jacobson
- Succeeded by: Philip S. Kosnett

Personal details
- Born: 1957 (age 68–69)
- Spouse: Vonda Kimble Delawie
- Education: Harvard College BA economics

Gregory Delawie (born 1957) is a United States diplomat. From 2015 to 2018, he was the US ambassador to Kosovo. Previously served as the Deputy Assistant Secretary for Verification, Planning, and European Security in the State Department's Bureau of Arms Control, Verification and Compliance. He also served as Deputy Chief of Mission at the U.S. Embassy Embassy in Zagreb, Croatia and Berlin, Germany.

== Personal life ==
Greg Delawie is originally from San Diego, California, and is the son of Homer Delawie. He is married to Vonda Kimble Delawie, a retired Foreign Service Officer. The couple have two children. Delawie speaks German, Italian, Turkish and Croatian.

== See also ==
- Ambassadors of the United States

Diplomatic posts
Preceded by Tracey Ann Jacobson	United States Ambassador to Kosovo; 2015–2018	Succeeded by Philip S. Kosnett
