= Nina Maria Fite =

American diplomat

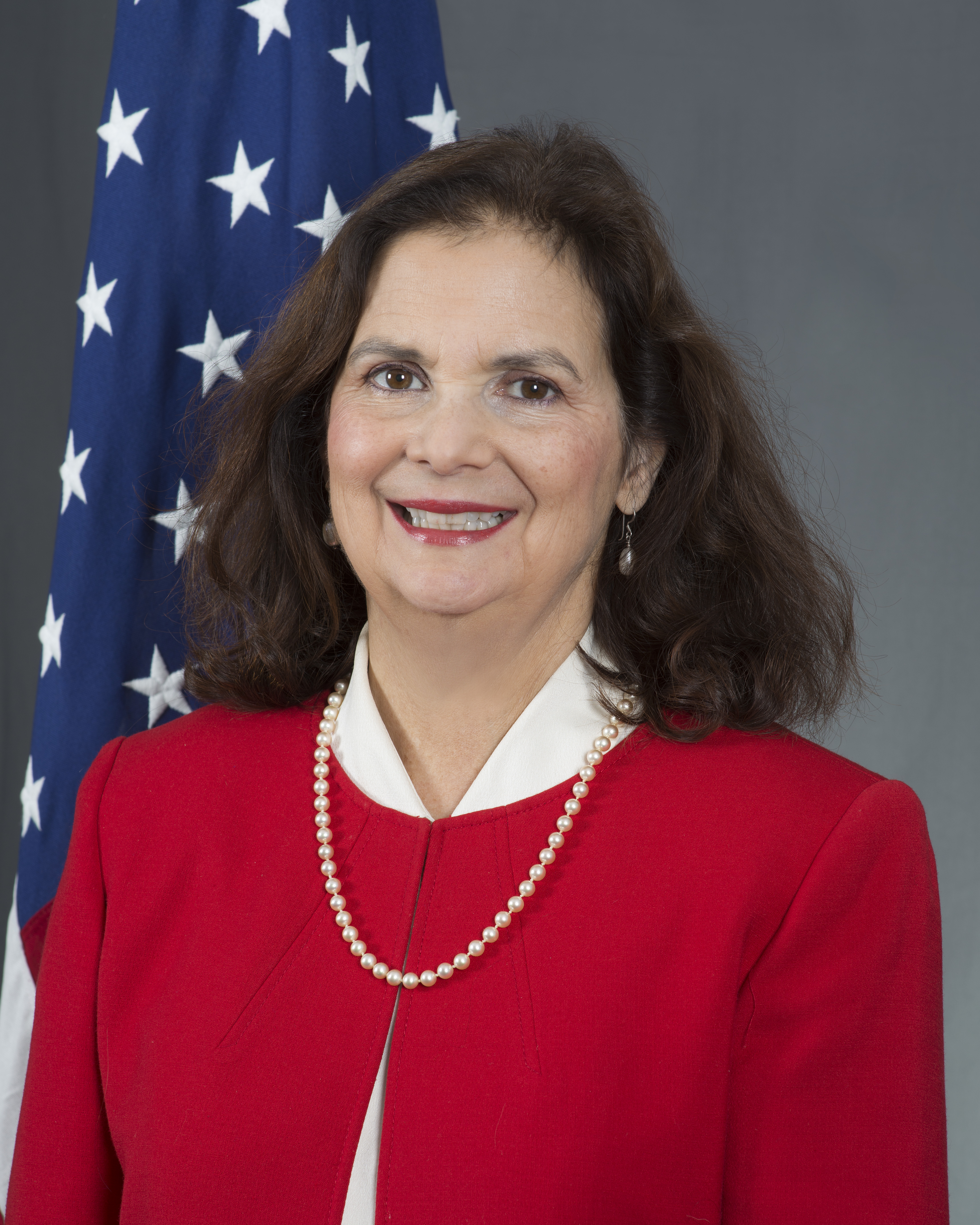

9th United States Ambassador to Angola
- In office February 14, 2018 – November 8, 2021
- President: Donald Trump; Joe Biden
- Preceded by: Helen La Lime
- Succeeded by: Tulinabo S. Mushingi

Principal Officer at the U.S. Consulate General in Montreal, Canada
- In office September 9, 2014 – August 2017
- President: Barack Obama; Donald Trump

Personal details
- Education: Carnegie Mellon University; National Defense University; Thunderbird School of Global Management

Nina Maria Fite is an American diplomat and a career member of the Senior Foreign Service who served as the United States Ambassador to Angola from 2018 to 2021. Prior to assuming her role as ambassador, Fite served as Principal Officer at the U.S. Consulate General in Montreal, Canada. Since becoming a diplomat in 1990, Fite has served at seven U.S. overseas missions. On September 2, 2017, President Donald Trump announced his intent to nominate Fite to serve as an ambassador of the United States to Angola. On September 5, 2017, her nomination was sent to the Senate. Her nomination was reported favorably out of committee on October 26. She was confirmed by the United States Senate by voice vote on November 2, 2017. She presented her credentials on February 14, 2018. Her term as ambassador ended on November 8, 2021. Fite's diplomatic assignments have included posts in Lahore as Consul General, in Kabul as Deputy Economic Counselor, and in Luanda as the Political/Economic Section Chief. She has also been on assignment with the Office of the United States Trade Representative. She appointed Chargé d'Affaires ad interim Moldova on July 10, 2024.

== Personal life ==
In addition to English, Fite speaks Portuguese, French, Spanish, and Hungarian.

Diplomatic posts
Preceded by Helen La Lime	United States Ambassador to Angola; 2018–2021	Succeeded by Tulinabo S. Mushingi
