= Joseph G. Sullivan =

American diplomat (born 1944)

Joseph Gerard Sullivan
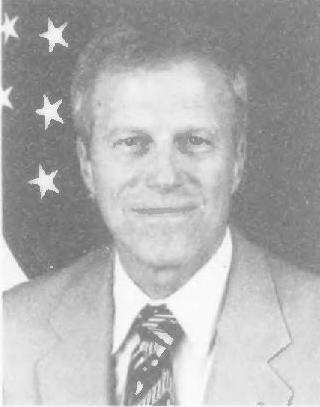

3rd United States Ambassador to Angola
- In office December 17, 1998 – August 16, 2001
- President: Bill Clinton; George W. Bush
- Preceded by: Donald Steinberg
- Succeeded by: Christopher Dell

Personal details
- Born: August 9, 1944 (age 81) Boston, Massachusetts, U.S.
- Education: Boston Latin School
- Alma mater: Tufts University (B.A.); Georgetown University (M.A.)

Joseph Gerard Sullivan (born August 9, 1944) is an American diplomat who was a career minister in the Senior Foreign Service. He served as the U.S. ambassador to Zimbabwe (2001–2004) and Angola (1998–2001). He was also Principal Officer in Cuba from 1993 to 1996. He was nominated to be Ambassador to Nicaragua but his nomination was not acted upon by the Senate.

Sullivan was born in Boston, Massachusetts in August 1944. He lived in the Neponset section of Dorchester, Boston until he was ten years old, when the family moved to the nearby St. Ann's parish. In seventh grade, he started attending the Boston Latin School.

Sullivan earned an M.A. degree in government from Georgetown University and a B.A. degree from Tufts University (class of 1966).
