= Jeff Hovenier =

American diplomat

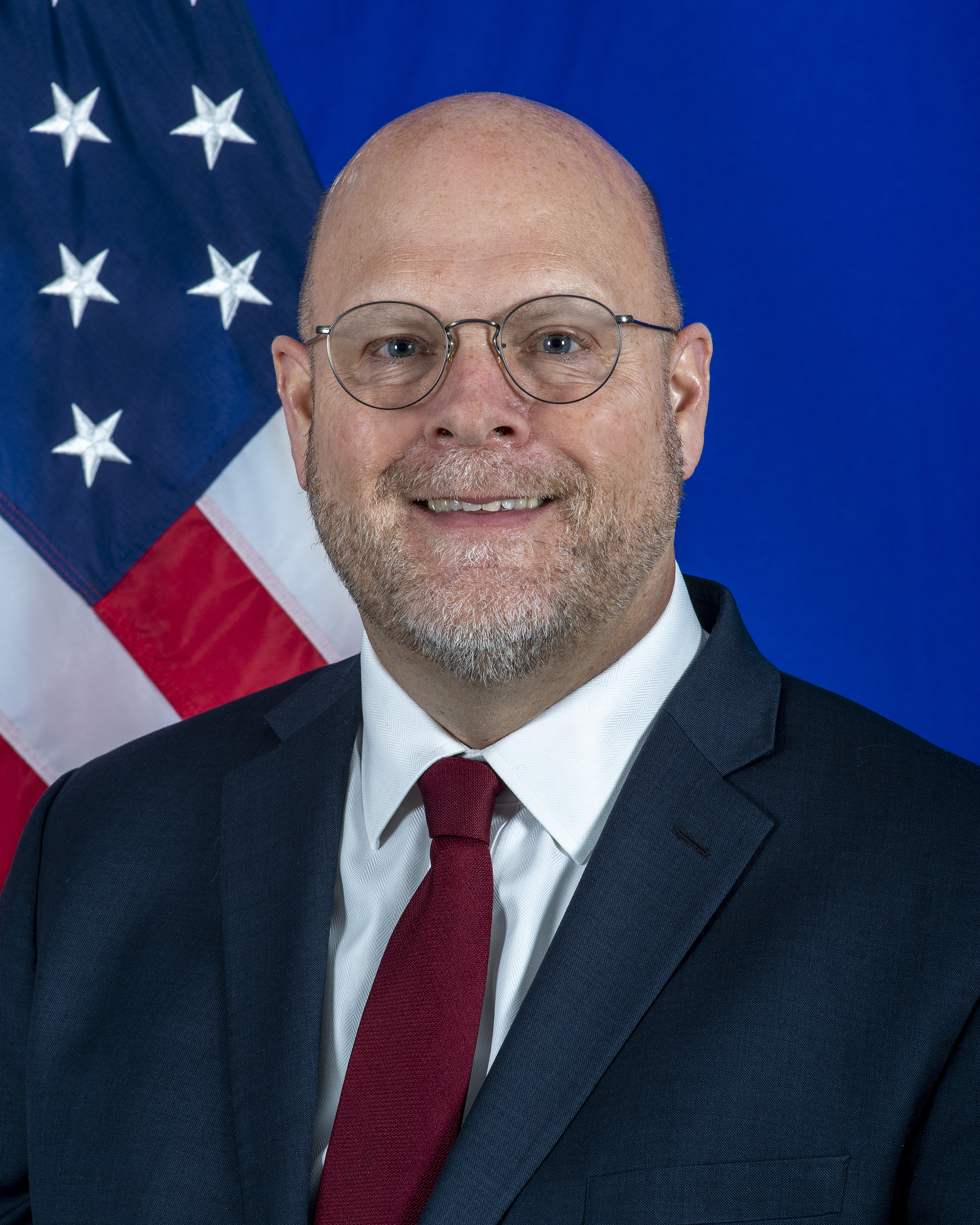

United States Ambassador to Kosovo
- In office January 10, 2022 – December 30, 2024
- President: Joe Biden
- Preceded by: Philip S. Kosnett
- Succeeded by: Anu Prattipati (Chargé d'affaires ad interim)

Personal details
- Born: Jeffrey Hovenier
- Education: Brigham Young University (BA); Georgetown University (MA)

Jeffrey M. Hovenier is a retired American diplomat who served as the United States ambassador to Kosovo from 2022 to 2024.

== Early life and education ==
Hovenier was raised in Bellingham, Washington. He earned a Bachelor of Arts degree in international relations from Brigham Young University and a Master of Arts in government and international relations from Georgetown University.

== Career ==
A former member of the Senior Foreign Service, Hovenier served in Peru, Croatia, Greece, Panama, Germany, and Paraguay, in addition to the Organization for Security and Co-operation in Europe. Hovenier also served as the director for Central and Southeastern European affairs for the United States National Security Council. Hovenier also served in the U.S. Embassy in Ankara, Turkey as its charge d’affaires from August 2018 to July 2019, and Deputy Chief of Mission from August 2018 to July 2021, when Scott M. Oudkirk assumed his post as Deputy Chief of Mission.

=== United States ambassador to Kosovo ===
On July 2, 2021, President Joe Biden nominated Hovenier to serve as United States Ambassador to Kosovo. On October 5, 2021, a hearing on his nomination was held before the Senate Foreign Relations Committee. On October 19, 2021, his nomination was reported favorably out of committee. The United States Senate confirmed him on November 18, 2021, by voice vote. He presented his credentials to President Vjosa Osmani in Pristina on January 10, 2022.

=== Retirement from Foreign Service ===
Ambassador Hovenier retired from the Department of State in December 2024.

=== Atlantic Council ===
Hovenier currently serves as a non-resident fellow at the Atlantic Council.

== Personal life ==
Hovenier speaks German, Greek, Croatian, and Spanish.

Diplomatic posts
Preceded by Philip S. Kosnett	Deputy chief of mission, United States Embassy in Ankara; August 2018–July 2021	Succeeded by Scott M. Oudkirk
Preceded by Philip S. Kosnett	United States Ambassador to Kosovo; 2022–2024	Vacant
