= Helen La Lime =

American diplomat

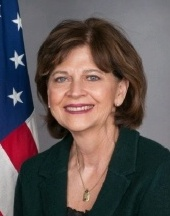
- La Lime in 2014

Special Representative of the UN Secretary-General for Haiti
- Incumbent
- Assumed office October 14, 2019

8th United States Ambassador in Angola
- In office May 15, 2014 – November 24, 2017
- President: Barack Obama; Donald Trump
- Preceded by: Christopher McMullen
- Succeeded by: Nina Maria Fite

Personal details
- Born: Helen Ruth Meagher; 1951 (age 74–75)
- Spouse: Robert La Lime
- Children: 2
- Parent(s): Ray Meagher; Teresa Meagher
- Education: Georgetown University (BS); National Defense University (MS)

Helen Ruth Meagher La Lime (born 1951) is a diplomat, former United States Ambassador to Angola, and United Nations Special Representative in Haiti.

== Early life and education ==
Born Helen R. Meagher, she is one of three daughters of Ray Meagher, a Texaco employee, and his wife Teresa. She lived in Angola during part of her childhood because of her father's work assignment there with Texaco. She was an undergraduate at Georgetown University, where she earned a Bachelor of Science degree in 1973. She was awarded a Master of Science degree from the National Defense University in 1996.

== Career ==
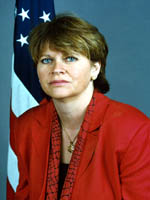
La Lime during her time as Ambassador to Mozambique

La Lime began her career teaching English in Europe. During that time she lived in France, Portugal and the Netherlands. She began her foreign service career when she joined the U.S. State Department in 1980, and has held a variety of policy and leadership roles in the U.S., Europe and Africa. Her first assignments brought her to European locations, including Germany, Poland and Switzerland.

From 1993 to 1995 La Lime worked at the Bureau of International Organization Affairs, the U.S. government's main outreach arm to the United Nations and many other international organizations.

Her next assignments were mainly in Africa. She worked at the embassy in Chad from 1996 to 1999. Her next two assignments were at the Office of Central African Affairs, first as deputy director and then as director. After she served in Morocco for two years, President George W. Bush nominated her to be ambassador to Mozambique, where she served from April 2003 to December 2006. She then served in two diplomatic roles in South Africa from 2006 to 2011.

Just prior to being nominated for the role of U.S. ambassador to Angola, La Lime was in Germany with the U.S. Africa Command, having earned the rank of Minister Counselor. In that role she was focused on American cooperation with African countries from a military standpoint.

On September 10, 2013, President Obama nominated her to be the United States Ambassador to Angola. On May 15, 2014, the Senate confirmed her nomination by voice vote.

She was for a time a senior advisor at Albright Stonebridge Group.

Presently, she is the head of the United Nations Integrated Office in Haiti (BINUH) and she is working with the Haitian actors to find a solution to the crisis in the Country.

== Personal life ==
In addition to English, she speaks French, German, Portuguese, Polish and Spanish. She has a son and daughter.

== See also ==
- Ambassadors of the United States
