= List of ambassadors of the United States to Angola =

Ambassador of the United States to Angola
- Embaixador dos Estados Unidos em Angola
- Seal of the United States Department of State

- Flag of a United States ambassador

- Incumbent; Shannon Nagy Cazeau; Chargé d'affaires since October 2, 2025
- Nominator: The president of the United States
- Appointer: The president; with Senate advice and consent
- Inaugural holder: Edmund T. De Jarnette as Ambassador Extraordinary and Plenipotentiary
- Formation: May 9, 1994
- Website: Official website

Angola became independent of Portugal in 1975, but the U.S. did not recognize the Government of Angola declared by the MPLA. The U.S. recognized Angola after multiparty elections were held in 1992.

The United States established relations with Angola through the opening of a Liaison Office in Luanda on January 10, 1992, with Jeffrey Millington as Director. The United States recognized the government of Angola on May 19, 1993. The first ambassador was appointed on May 9, 1994.

== Ambassadors ==
#	Name	Appointed	Presented credentials	Terminated mission	Notes
1	Edmund DeJarnette – Career FSO	May 9, 1994	July 14, 1994	Left post, July 24, 1995	
2	Donald Steinberg – Career FSO	June 27, 1995	September 15, 1995	November 6, 1998	
3	Joseph Sullivan – Career FSO	October 22, 1998	December 17, 1998	August 16, 2001	
4	Christopher Dell – Career FSO	August 8, 2001	October 26, 2001	Left post, July 12, 2004	
5	Cynthia Efird – Career FSO	July 2, 2004	August 31, 2004	June 6, 2007	
6	Dan Mozena – Career FSO	November 19, 2007	January 9, 2008	July 3, 2010	
7	Christopher McMullen – Career FSO	September 30, 2010	March 3, 2011	June 12, 2013	
8	Helen La Lime – Career FSO	May 15, 2014	May 19, 2014	November 24, 2017	
9	Nina Maria Fite – Career FSO	November 20, 2017	February 14, 2018	November 8, 2021	
10	Tulinabo S. Mushingi – Career FSO	December 18, 2021	March 9, 2022	October 22, 2024	
-	James B. Story – Chargé d'affaires ad interim	October 23, 2024		May 6, 2025	
-	Jeremy Neitzke – Chargé d'affaires ad interim	May 6, 2025		June 3, 2025	
-	Noah Zaring – Chargé d'affaires ad interim	June 3, 2025		October 2, 2025	
-	Shannon Nagy Cazeau – Chargé d'affaires ad interim	October 2, 2025		Present	

The US ambassador to Angola holds the title Ambassador Extraordinary and Plenipotentiary.

== See also ==
- Angola – United States relations
- Foreign relations of Angola
- Ambassadors from the United States
