= Avni Spahiu =

Kosovar diplomat and former television director

Avni Spahiu (born 12 March 1956) is a Kosovar diplomat and former television director. During the period between 2008 and 2012 he served as ambassador to the United States. He was the Republic of Kosovo's ambassador to the Republic of Turkey from 2012 to 2019.

== Biography ==
Spahiu was born in Mitrovica, Kosovo, on 12 March 1956. He graduated from University of Pristina in 1978 with a degree in English literature. He obtained his master's degree in literature from the same university in 2004.

He started his career as a journalist in the newspaper Rilindja in 1978 and was its editor-in-chief between 1994 and 1998. From 1999 to 2002, he was editor in chief of Radio Television of Kosovo (RTK). Then from 2002 to 2008, he was director of RTK. In 2008 he was named as the Kosova's ambassador to the United States and remained in office until 2012. He was the ambassador of Kosova to Turkey between 2012 and 2019.
