= Deputy chief of mission =

Number-two diplomat at an embassy

A deputy chief of mission (DCM, in Europe the term deputy head of mission – DHoM or DHM is used instead) is the number-two diplomat assigned to an embassy or other diplomatic mission. The deputy chief of mission is usually considered the second-in-command to the head of mission (usually an ambassador). DCMs serve as chargé d'affaires (that is, as acting chief of mission) when the titular head of mission is outside the host country or when the post is vacant.

A DCM typically serves as a key advisor to the chiefs of mission as well as a chief of staff, and is responsible for the day-to-day management of the post. A DCM oversees the heads of sections (political, economic, public affairs, management, consular) at the embassy. They may also serve as de facto ombudsmen, responding to employee concerns and quality of life issues. Most career ambassadors have served as a DCM prior to their first assignment as chief of mission.

== See also ==
- Deputy
