= List of minor planets: 548001–549000 =

The following is a partial list of minor planets, running from minor-planet number 548001 through 549000, inclusive. The primary data for this and other partial lists is based on JPL's "Small-Body Orbital Elements" and data available from the Minor Planet Center. Critical list information is also provided by the MPC, unless otherwise specified from Lowell Observatory. A detailed description of the table's columns and additional sources are given on the main page including a complete list of every page in this series, and a statistical break-up on the dynamical classification of minor planets.

Also see the summary list of all named bodies in numerical and alphabetical order, and the corresponding naming citations for the number range of this particular list. New namings may only be added to this list after official publication, as the preannouncement of names is condemned by the Working Group for Small Bodies Nomenclature of the International Astronomical Union.

Near-Earth obj.	MBA (inner)	MBA (outer)	Centaur
Mars-crosser	MBA (middle)	Jupiter trojan	Trans-Neptunian obj.
Unclassified

== 548001–548100 ==
Designation			Discovery			Properties		Ref
Permanent	Provisional	Named after	Date	Site	Discoverer(s)	Category	Diam.	Ref
548001	2010 AS_{69}	—	January 12, 2010	Catalina	CSS	·	850 m	MPC · JPL
548002	2010 AM_{73}	—	January 6, 2010	Kitt Peak	Spacewatch	·	2.6 km	MPC · JPL
548003	2010 AO_{73}	—	January 4, 2010	Kitt Peak	Spacewatch	·	780 m	MPC · JPL
548004	2010 AK_{77}	—	December 20, 2009	Mount Lemmon	Mount Lemmon Survey	PHO	1.0 km	MPC · JPL
548005	2010 AM_{78}	—	November 15, 2009	Mount Lemmon	Mount Lemmon Survey	·	1.5 km	MPC · JPL
548006	2010 AT_{139}	—	September 25, 2005	Kitt Peak	Spacewatch	·	790 m	MPC · JPL
548007	2010 AM_{140}	—	December 18, 2009	Mount Lemmon	Mount Lemmon Survey	·	1.8 km	MPC · JPL
548008	2010 AG_{141}	—	August 28, 2005	Siding Spring	SSS	·	760 m	MPC · JPL
548009	2010 AH_{141}	—	November 20, 2009	Kitt Peak	Spacewatch	·	700 m	MPC · JPL
548010	2010 AP_{141}	—	January 4, 2010	Kitt Peak	Spacewatch	·	700 m	MPC · JPL
548011	2010 AY_{141}	—	January 6, 2010	Kitt Peak	Spacewatch	·	2.7 km	MPC · JPL
548012	2010 AT_{142}	—	February 20, 2006	Mount Lemmon	Mount Lemmon Survey	·	1.3 km	MPC · JPL
548013	2010 AR_{143}	—	January 8, 2010	Kitt Peak	Spacewatch	·	2.9 km	MPC · JPL
548014	2010 AW_{147}	—	September 29, 2009	Kitt Peak	Spacewatch	·	1.8 km	MPC · JPL
548015	2010 AY_{151}	—	January 31, 2004	Apache Point	SDSS	·	2.4 km	MPC · JPL
548016	2010 AU_{153}	—	August 28, 2014	Haleakala	Pan-STARRS 1	·	2.5 km	MPC · JPL
548017	2010 AM_{155}	—	July 14, 2013	Haleakala	Pan-STARRS 1	·	2.2 km	MPC · JPL
548018	2010 AJ_{156}	—	December 27, 2009	Kitt Peak	Spacewatch	·	1.6 km	MPC · JPL
548019	2010 AB_{157}	—	June 11, 2015	Haleakala	Pan-STARRS 1	·	1.4 km	MPC · JPL
548020	2010 AF_{157}	—	August 14, 2012	Haleakala	Pan-STARRS 1	·	840 m	MPC · JPL
548021	2010 AN_{157}	—	January 6, 2010	Kitt Peak	Spacewatch	·	1.7 km	MPC · JPL
548022	2010 AO_{157}	—	January 12, 2010	Mount Lemmon	Mount Lemmon Survey	H	570 m	MPC · JPL
548023	2010 AV_{157}	—	June 15, 2015	Haleakala	Pan-STARRS 1	·	1.1 km	MPC · JPL
548024	2010 AZ_{157}	—	July 14, 2013	Haleakala	Pan-STARRS 1	·	2.2 km	MPC · JPL
548025	2010 AB_{159}	—	September 29, 2008	Catalina	CSS	·	2.2 km	MPC · JPL
548026	2010 AE_{161}	—	April 6, 2011	Mount Lemmon	Mount Lemmon Survey	EMA	2.1 km	MPC · JPL
548027	2010 AG_{161}	—	January 19, 2016	Haleakala	Pan-STARRS 1	EUP	1.8 km	MPC · JPL
548028	2010 AT_{161}	—	January 8, 2010	Kitt Peak	Spacewatch	·	2.3 km	MPC · JPL
548029	2010 AD_{162}	—	January 5, 2010	Kitt Peak	Spacewatch	·	2.6 km	MPC · JPL
548030	2010 AR_{162}	—	January 12, 2010	Mount Lemmon	Mount Lemmon Survey	·	2.1 km	MPC · JPL
548031	2010 BS_{4}	—	January 6, 2010	Kitt Peak	Spacewatch	·	2.1 km	MPC · JPL
548032 Ensisheim	2010 BU_{4}	Ensisheim	January 17, 2010	Nogales	J.-C. Merlin	·	1.9 km	MPC · JPL
548033	2010 BB_{136}	—	October 8, 2012	Haleakala	Pan-STARRS 1	·	3.4 km	MPC · JPL
548034	2010 BD_{146}	—	October 6, 2012	Haleakala	Pan-STARRS 1	·	1.4 km	MPC · JPL
548035	2010 CR	—	February 3, 2010	Marly	P. Kocher	·	800 m	MPC · JPL
548036	2010 CD_{3}	—	January 11, 2010	Kitt Peak	Spacewatch	·	2.2 km	MPC · JPL
548037	2010 CM_{3}	—	February 5, 2010	Kitt Peak	Spacewatch	·	890 m	MPC · JPL
548038	2010 CZ_{3}	—	February 6, 2010	Mount Lemmon	Mount Lemmon Survey	·	1.7 km	MPC · JPL
548039	2010 CG_{22}	—	December 8, 2005	Kitt Peak	Spacewatch	·	1.1 km	MPC · JPL
548040	2010 CG_{24}	—	January 30, 2006	Kitt Peak	Spacewatch	·	810 m	MPC · JPL
548041	2010 CX_{24}	—	January 6, 2010	Kitt Peak	Spacewatch	·	3.9 km	MPC · JPL
548042	2010 CD_{25}	—	April 29, 2006	Kitt Peak	Spacewatch	·	2.0 km	MPC · JPL
548043	2010 CG_{25}	—	July 16, 2004	Cerro Tololo	Deep Ecliptic Survey	·	800 m	MPC · JPL
548044	2010 CA_{26}	—	February 9, 2010	Mount Lemmon	Mount Lemmon Survey	·	770 m	MPC · JPL
548045	2010 CY_{29}	—	September 28, 2000	Kitt Peak	Spacewatch	·	770 m	MPC · JPL
548046	2010 CD_{30}	—	December 2, 2005	Kitt Peak	Wasserman, L. H., Millis, R. L.	·	1.0 km	MPC · JPL
548047	2010 CZ_{32}	—	March 4, 2005	Kitt Peak	Spacewatch	EOS	1.8 km	MPC · JPL
548048	2010 CZ_{33}	—	February 10, 2010	Kitt Peak	Spacewatch	·	2.4 km	MPC · JPL
548049	2010 CG_{34}	—	August 25, 2001	Kitt Peak	Spacewatch	·	3.2 km	MPC · JPL
548050	2010 CH_{34}	—	February 10, 2010	Kitt Peak	Spacewatch	·	810 m	MPC · JPL
548051	2010 CV_{34}	—	February 10, 2010	Kitt Peak	Spacewatch	EOS	1.5 km	MPC · JPL
548052	2010 CD_{38}	—	April 25, 2007	Mount Lemmon	Mount Lemmon Survey	·	990 m	MPC · JPL
548053	2010 CR_{40}	—	February 13, 2010	Kitt Peak	Spacewatch	V	430 m	MPC · JPL
548054	2010 CS_{41}	—	December 19, 2009	Mount Lemmon	Mount Lemmon Survey	·	970 m	MPC · JPL
548055	2010 CV_{42}	—	February 9, 2010	Kitt Peak	Spacewatch	TIR	2.4 km	MPC · JPL
548056	2010 CZ_{60}	—	December 25, 2009	Kitt Peak	Spacewatch	·	1.5 km	MPC · JPL
548057	2010 CO_{64}	—	February 9, 2010	Mount Lemmon	Mount Lemmon Survey	·	990 m	MPC · JPL
548058	2010 CF_{65}	—	February 9, 2010	Kitt Peak	Spacewatch	PHO	670 m	MPC · JPL
548059	2010 CR_{66}	—	February 10, 2010	Kitt Peak	Spacewatch	·	2.5 km	MPC · JPL
548060	2010 CN_{67}	—	March 2, 2006	Kitt Peak	Spacewatch	·	890 m	MPC · JPL
548061	2010 CB_{68}	—	October 26, 2008	Mount Lemmon	Mount Lemmon Survey	·	2.6 km	MPC · JPL
548062	2010 CX_{69}	—	December 18, 2009	Kitt Peak	Spacewatch	·	880 m	MPC · JPL
548063	2010 CG_{71}	—	November 19, 2003	Kitt Peak	Spacewatch	·	2.0 km	MPC · JPL
548064	2010 CU_{71}	—	February 13, 2010	Mount Lemmon	Mount Lemmon Survey	·	2.5 km	MPC · JPL
548065	2010 CX_{71}	—	October 29, 2005	Kitt Peak	Spacewatch	V	510 m	MPC · JPL
548066	2010 CT_{73}	—	September 23, 2008	Kitt Peak	Spacewatch	·	810 m	MPC · JPL
548067	2010 CA_{74}	—	February 13, 2010	Mount Lemmon	Mount Lemmon Survey	·	2.6 km	MPC · JPL
548068	2010 CK_{78}	—	February 13, 2010	Mount Lemmon	Mount Lemmon Survey	·	2.5 km	MPC · JPL
548069	2010 CN_{81}	—	February 13, 2010	Mount Lemmon	Mount Lemmon Survey	·	2.5 km	MPC · JPL
548070	2010 CT_{81}	—	November 1, 2005	Mount Lemmon	Mount Lemmon Survey	·	800 m	MPC · JPL
548071	2010 CR_{83}	—	September 5, 2008	Kitt Peak	Spacewatch	·	1.8 km	MPC · JPL
548072	2010 CV_{83}	—	February 14, 2010	Kitt Peak	Spacewatch	·	2.5 km	MPC · JPL
548073	2010 CB_{84}	—	February 14, 2010	Mount Lemmon	Mount Lemmon Survey	NYS	780 m	MPC · JPL
548074	2010 CB_{85}	—	April 29, 2003	Kitt Peak	Spacewatch	·	1.3 km	MPC · JPL
548075	2010 CH_{87}	—	February 14, 2010	Mount Lemmon	Mount Lemmon Survey	·	2.7 km	MPC · JPL
548076	2010 CW_{87}	—	October 25, 2005	Mount Lemmon	Mount Lemmon Survey	·	710 m	MPC · JPL
548077	2010 CE_{88}	—	February 14, 2010	Mount Lemmon	Mount Lemmon Survey	EOS	1.5 km	MPC · JPL
548078	2010 CT_{88}	—	February 14, 2010	Mount Lemmon	Mount Lemmon Survey	EOS	1.2 km	MPC · JPL
548079	2010 CM_{89}	—	February 14, 2010	Mount Lemmon	Mount Lemmon Survey	EUP	2.2 km	MPC · JPL
548080	2010 CM_{90}	—	March 11, 2005	Kitt Peak	Spacewatch	·	2.1 km	MPC · JPL
548081	2010 CV_{90}	—	January 12, 2010	Mount Lemmon	Mount Lemmon Survey	·	780 m	MPC · JPL
548082	2010 CW_{91}	—	February 14, 2010	Kitt Peak	Spacewatch	·	2.6 km	MPC · JPL
548083	2010 CE_{97}	—	April 15, 2007	Kitt Peak	Spacewatch	NYS	1.1 km	MPC · JPL
548084	2010 CL_{97}	—	February 14, 2010	Mount Lemmon	Mount Lemmon Survey	·	1.5 km	MPC · JPL
548085	2010 CD_{98}	—	February 14, 2010	Mount Lemmon	Mount Lemmon Survey	·	1.8 km	MPC · JPL
548086	2010 CG_{100}	—	December 28, 2005	Mount Lemmon	Mount Lemmon Survey	·	700 m	MPC · JPL
548087	2010 CY_{100}	—	November 25, 2005	Kitt Peak	Spacewatch	MAS	530 m	MPC · JPL
548088	2010 CG_{101}	—	October 27, 2008	Kitt Peak	Spacewatch	·	1.1 km	MPC · JPL
548089	2010 CL_{101}	—	April 10, 2003	Kitt Peak	Spacewatch	MAS	650 m	MPC · JPL
548090	2010 CG_{103}	—	February 14, 2010	Kitt Peak	Spacewatch	·	2.4 km	MPC · JPL
548091	2010 CN_{106}	—	December 6, 2005	Kitt Peak	Spacewatch	·	920 m	MPC · JPL
548092	2010 CP_{106}	—	November 7, 2005	Mauna Kea	A. Boattini	·	670 m	MPC · JPL
548093	2010 CA_{107}	—	February 14, 2010	Mount Lemmon	Mount Lemmon Survey	·	1.8 km	MPC · JPL
548094	2010 CE_{108}	—	February 14, 2010	Kitt Peak	Spacewatch	·	2.7 km	MPC · JPL
548095	2010 CQ_{108}	—	February 14, 2010	Mount Lemmon	Mount Lemmon Survey	EOS	1.5 km	MPC · JPL
548096	2010 CV_{109}	—	November 7, 2008	Mount Lemmon	Mount Lemmon Survey	THM	1.8 km	MPC · JPL
548097	2010 CM_{110}	—	September 5, 2007	Mount Lemmon	Mount Lemmon Survey	·	2.4 km	MPC · JPL
548098	2010 CO_{110}	—	February 14, 2010	Mount Lemmon	Mount Lemmon Survey	·	1.6 km	MPC · JPL
548099	2010 CQ_{112}	—	February 14, 2010	Mount Lemmon	Mount Lemmon Survey	TIR	1.9 km	MPC · JPL
548100	2010 CW_{113}	—	September 9, 2007	Kitt Peak	Spacewatch	·	2.3 km	MPC · JPL

== 548101–548200 ==
back to top

Designation			Discovery			Properties		Ref
Permanent	Provisional	Named after	Date	Site	Discoverer(s)	Category	Diam.	Ref
548101	2010 CA_{115}	—	February 14, 2010	Mount Lemmon	Mount Lemmon Survey	·	790 m	MPC · JPL
548102	2010 CN_{115}	—	February 14, 2010	Mount Lemmon	Mount Lemmon Survey	EOS	1.9 km	MPC · JPL
548103	2010 CB_{120}	—	February 15, 2010	Mount Lemmon	Mount Lemmon Survey	·	2.3 km	MPC · JPL
548104	2010 CQ_{121}	—	February 14, 2010	Mount Lemmon	Mount Lemmon Survey	V	540 m	MPC · JPL
548105	2010 CY_{122}	—	March 8, 2005	Mount Lemmon	Mount Lemmon Survey	·	2.2 km	MPC · JPL
548106	2010 CA_{123}	—	February 15, 2010	Mount Lemmon	Mount Lemmon Survey	·	1.9 km	MPC · JPL
548107	2010 CJ_{124}	—	December 2, 2005	Mount Lemmon	Mount Lemmon Survey	·	780 m	MPC · JPL
548108	2010 CC_{126}	—	February 15, 2010	Mount Lemmon	Mount Lemmon Survey	THM	1.8 km	MPC · JPL
548109	2010 CE_{126}	—	February 15, 2010	Mount Lemmon	Mount Lemmon Survey	·	2.2 km	MPC · JPL
548110	2010 CJ_{126}	—	March 23, 2003	Apache Point	SDSS	·	790 m	MPC · JPL
548111	2010 CQ_{126}	—	January 12, 2010	Kitt Peak	Spacewatch	·	730 m	MPC · JPL
548112	2010 CD_{127}	—	March 16, 2005	Mount Lemmon	Mount Lemmon Survey	·	1.7 km	MPC · JPL
548113	2010 CJ_{139}	—	January 6, 2010	Kitt Peak	Spacewatch	·	2.5 km	MPC · JPL
548114	2010 CX_{143}	—	September 23, 2008	Kitt Peak	Spacewatch	·	1.7 km	MPC · JPL
548115	2010 CV_{145}	—	September 7, 2008	Mount Lemmon	Mount Lemmon Survey	V	570 m	MPC · JPL
548116	2010 CH_{146}	—	February 13, 2010	Mount Lemmon	Mount Lemmon Survey	PHO	890 m	MPC · JPL
548117	2010 CW_{147}	—	January 4, 2006	Kitt Peak	Spacewatch	·	910 m	MPC · JPL
548118	2010 CV_{149}	—	February 14, 2010	Mount Lemmon	Mount Lemmon Survey	·	1.1 km	MPC · JPL
548119	2010 CG_{150}	—	February 14, 2010	Mount Lemmon	Mount Lemmon Survey	·	2.0 km	MPC · JPL
548120	2010 CV_{150}	—	February 14, 2010	Kitt Peak	Spacewatch	·	2.7 km	MPC · JPL
548121	2010 CY_{151}	—	February 14, 2010	Kitt Peak	Spacewatch	EOS	1.8 km	MPC · JPL
548122	2010 CN_{152}	—	February 14, 2010	Kitt Peak	Spacewatch	·	2.1 km	MPC · JPL
548123	2010 CL_{153}	—	October 16, 2001	Kitt Peak	Spacewatch	·	910 m	MPC · JPL
548124	2010 CJ_{154}	—	June 19, 2006	Mount Lemmon	Mount Lemmon Survey	·	2.5 km	MPC · JPL
548125	2010 CN_{157}	—	January 8, 2006	Kitt Peak	Spacewatch	·	930 m	MPC · JPL
548126	2010 CU_{158}	—	February 15, 2010	Kitt Peak	Spacewatch	·	1.3 km	MPC · JPL
548127	2010 CZ_{161}	—	February 9, 2010	Kitt Peak	Spacewatch	EMA	3.0 km	MPC · JPL
548128	2010 CK_{162}	—	February 9, 2010	Kitt Peak	Spacewatch	·	870 m	MPC · JPL
548129	2010 CU_{162}	—	March 5, 2006	Mount Lemmon	Mount Lemmon Survey	·	940 m	MPC · JPL
548130	2010 CY_{162}	—	February 9, 2010	Mount Lemmon	Mount Lemmon Survey	·	1.9 km	MPC · JPL
548131	2010 CJ_{164}	—	August 9, 2007	Kitt Peak	Spacewatch	·	2.5 km	MPC · JPL
548132	2010 CP_{164}	—	February 10, 2010	Kitt Peak	Spacewatch	NYS	710 m	MPC · JPL
548133	2010 CN_{167}	—	February 14, 2010	Kitt Peak	Spacewatch	·	2.9 km	MPC · JPL
548134	2010 CG_{174}	—	September 30, 2003	Kitt Peak	Spacewatch	·	1.7 km	MPC · JPL
548135	2010 CZ_{174}	—	January 8, 2010	Mount Lemmon	Mount Lemmon Survey	·	1.3 km	MPC · JPL
548136	2010 CK_{175}	—	January 11, 2010	Kitt Peak	Spacewatch	PHO	660 m	MPC · JPL
548137	2010 CM_{176}	—	January 18, 2015	Mount Lemmon	Mount Lemmon Survey	EOS	1.8 km	MPC · JPL
548138	2010 CL_{179}	—	February 9, 2010	Mount Lemmon	Mount Lemmon Survey	H	470 m	MPC · JPL
548139	2010 CN_{185}	—	February 14, 2010	Catalina	CSS	·	3.3 km	MPC · JPL
548140	2010 CY_{252}	—	March 9, 2015	Mount Lemmon	Mount Lemmon Survey	·	3.0 km	MPC · JPL
548141	2010 CD_{270}	—	February 4, 2010	Haleakala	Pan-STARRS 1	centaur	138 km	MPC · JPL
548142	2010 CQ_{270}	—	February 14, 2010	Mount Lemmon	Mount Lemmon Survey	·	1.0 km	MPC · JPL
548143	2010 CR_{270}	—	February 5, 2016	Haleakala	Pan-STARRS 1	TIR	2.5 km	MPC · JPL
548144	2010 CA_{271}	—	October 12, 2016	Mount Lemmon	Mount Lemmon Survey	·	1.5 km	MPC · JPL
548145	2010 CH_{271}	—	September 12, 2013	Kitt Peak	Spacewatch	·	3.3 km	MPC · JPL
548146	2010 CN_{271}	—	July 2, 2011	Kitt Peak	Spacewatch	H	430 m	MPC · JPL
548147	2010 CP_{271}	—	November 23, 2014	Haleakala	Pan-STARRS 1	·	1.9 km	MPC · JPL
548148	2010 CE_{272}	—	June 18, 2018	Haleakala	Pan-STARRS 1	·	2.3 km	MPC · JPL
548149	2010 CL_{272}	—	July 28, 2011	Haleakala	Pan-STARRS 1	·	1.1 km	MPC · JPL
548150	2010 CY_{272}	—	August 14, 2013	Haleakala	Pan-STARRS 1	·	2.5 km	MPC · JPL
548151	2010 CD_{274}	—	November 20, 2014	Haleakala	Pan-STARRS 1	·	2.0 km	MPC · JPL
548152	2010 CY_{274}	—	February 10, 2010	Kitt Peak	Spacewatch	·	2.4 km	MPC · JPL
548153	2010 CB_{275}	—	February 15, 2010	Mount Lemmon	Mount Lemmon Survey	·	650 m	MPC · JPL
548154	2010 DX	—	February 17, 2010	Catalina	CSS	·	2.2 km	MPC · JPL
548155	2010 DY_{2}	—	February 16, 2010	Kitt Peak	Spacewatch	·	2.2 km	MPC · JPL
548156	2010 DK_{4}	—	April 26, 2000	Kitt Peak	Spacewatch	·	1.9 km	MPC · JPL
548157	2010 DT_{4}	—	November 3, 2005	Kitt Peak	Spacewatch	MAS	530 m	MPC · JPL
548158	2010 DK_{8}	—	February 16, 2010	Kitt Peak	Spacewatch	·	2.0 km	MPC · JPL
548159	2010 DY_{10}	—	February 16, 2010	Mount Lemmon	Mount Lemmon Survey	NYS	870 m	MPC · JPL
548160	2010 DX_{35}	—	February 16, 2010	Kitt Peak	Spacewatch	EUN	980 m	MPC · JPL
548161	2010 DJ_{37}	—	February 16, 2010	Kitt Peak	Spacewatch	·	2.0 km	MPC · JPL
548162	2010 DG_{38}	—	September 10, 2007	Mount Lemmon	Mount Lemmon Survey	·	2.9 km	MPC · JPL
548163	2010 DA_{39}	—	February 1, 2005	Kitt Peak	Spacewatch	·	1.8 km	MPC · JPL
548164	2010 DJ_{40}	—	February 16, 2010	Kitt Peak	Spacewatch	V	520 m	MPC · JPL
548165	2010 DP_{42}	—	February 17, 2010	Kitt Peak	Spacewatch	·	2.2 km	MPC · JPL
548166	2010 DP_{43}	—	September 9, 2007	Kitt Peak	Spacewatch	EOS	1.8 km	MPC · JPL
548167	2010 DW_{43}	—	October 26, 2008	Kitt Peak	Spacewatch	·	2.0 km	MPC · JPL
548168	2010 DU_{45}	—	February 6, 2010	Kitt Peak	Spacewatch	·	1.9 km	MPC · JPL
548169	2010 DC_{46}	—	February 17, 2010	Kitt Peak	Spacewatch	·	1.0 km	MPC · JPL
548170	2010 DN_{47}	—	January 12, 2010	Kitt Peak	Spacewatch	·	2.9 km	MPC · JPL
548171	2010 DP_{91}	—	January 11, 2010	Kitt Peak	Spacewatch	·	960 m	MPC · JPL
548172	2010 DD_{92}	—	March 17, 2010	Kitt Peak	Spacewatch	·	2.4 km	MPC · JPL
548173	2010 DE_{100}	—	September 14, 2012	Mount Lemmon	Mount Lemmon Survey	·	4.0 km	MPC · JPL
548174	2010 DU_{106}	—	January 17, 2015	Haleakala	Pan-STARRS 1	·	2.4 km	MPC · JPL
548175	2010 DX_{106}	—	October 6, 2012	Kitt Peak	Spacewatch	·	1.1 km	MPC · JPL
548176	2010 DD_{107}	—	November 7, 2012	Nogales	M. Schwartz, P. R. Holvorcem	·	790 m	MPC · JPL
548177	2010 DE_{107}	—	November 12, 2012	Mount Lemmon	Mount Lemmon Survey	·	800 m	MPC · JPL
548178	2010 DO_{107}	—	October 20, 2012	Haleakala	Pan-STARRS 1	V	540 m	MPC · JPL
548179	2010 DQ_{107}	—	February 17, 2010	Kitt Peak	Spacewatch	·	2.5 km	MPC · JPL
548180	2010 DF_{108}	—	February 19, 2010	Mount Lemmon	Mount Lemmon Survey	H	430 m	MPC · JPL
548181	2010 DC_{109}	—	August 12, 2013	Haleakala	Pan-STARRS 1	·	2.2 km	MPC · JPL
548182	2010 DH_{109}	—	February 17, 2010	Kitt Peak	Spacewatch	·	2.5 km	MPC · JPL
548183	2010 DQ_{111}	—	September 9, 2015	Haleakala	Pan-STARRS 1	·	710 m	MPC · JPL
548184	2010 DH_{112}	—	February 17, 2010	Kitt Peak	Spacewatch	·	1.1 km	MPC · JPL
548185	2010 EJ_{31}	—	September 9, 2007	Kitt Peak	Spacewatch	·	1.9 km	MPC · JPL
548186	2010 EO_{31}	—	October 27, 2008	Mount Lemmon	Mount Lemmon Survey	THM	1.8 km	MPC · JPL
548187	2010 EW_{32}	—	March 16, 2005	Kitt Peak	Spacewatch	·	1.7 km	MPC · JPL
548188	2010 EP_{35}	—	April 25, 2003	Kitt Peak	Spacewatch	·	1.1 km	MPC · JPL
548189	2010 EO_{36}	—	October 31, 2005	Mauna Kea	A. Boattini	MAS	880 m	MPC · JPL
548190	2010 ER_{36}	—	October 29, 2008	Kitt Peak	Spacewatch	·	2.2 km	MPC · JPL
548191	2010 EM_{37}	—	March 12, 2010	Mount Lemmon	Mount Lemmon Survey	·	1 km	MPC · JPL
548192	2010 ET_{40}	—	February 14, 2010	Mount Lemmon	Mount Lemmon Survey	·	2.8 km	MPC · JPL
548193	2010 EP_{43}	—	March 11, 2010	Plana	Fratev, F.	EOS	1.7 km	MPC · JPL
548194	2010 EN_{45}	—	April 7, 1999	Kitt Peak	Spacewatch	V	700 m	MPC · JPL
548195	2010 EE_{46}	—	March 13, 2010	Catalina	CSS	·	1.2 km	MPC · JPL
548196	2010 EC_{66}	—	September 13, 2007	Kitt Peak	Spacewatch	·	3.1 km	MPC · JPL
548197	2010 ES_{66}	—	October 27, 2008	Mount Lemmon	Mount Lemmon Survey	THM	1.7 km	MPC · JPL
548198	2010 EB_{67}	—	March 12, 2010	Catalina	CSS	·	2.6 km	MPC · JPL
548199	2010 EX_{67}	—	March 12, 2010	Mount Lemmon	Mount Lemmon Survey	·	2.5 km	MPC · JPL
548200	2010 EL_{68}	—	March 12, 2010	Mount Lemmon	Mount Lemmon Survey	T_{j} (2.94)	3.2 km	MPC · JPL

== 548201–548300 ==
back to top

Designation			Discovery			Properties		Ref
Permanent	Provisional	Named after	Date	Site	Discoverer(s)	Category	Diam.	Ref
548201	2010 EY_{68}	—	March 12, 2010	Catalina	CSS	·	2.0 km	MPC · JPL
548202	2010 EV_{75}	—	March 12, 2010	Kitt Peak	Spacewatch	MAS	630 m	MPC · JPL
548203	2010 ED_{76}	—	March 12, 2010	Kitt Peak	Spacewatch	MAS	600 m	MPC · JPL
548204	2010 EG_{79}	—	February 15, 2010	Kitt Peak	Spacewatch	·	2.2 km	MPC · JPL
548205	2010 ED_{80}	—	February 6, 2010	Kitt Peak	Spacewatch	·	3.3 km	MPC · JPL
548206	2010 ER_{81}	—	October 8, 2008	Kitt Peak	Spacewatch	·	1.1 km	MPC · JPL
548207	2010 ED_{82}	—	March 12, 2010	Mount Lemmon	Mount Lemmon Survey	·	2.5 km	MPC · JPL
548208	2010 EG_{83}	—	February 14, 2004	Kitt Peak	Spacewatch	·	2.6 km	MPC · JPL
548209	2010 EQ_{84}	—	January 11, 2010	Kitt Peak	Spacewatch	·	990 m	MPC · JPL
548210	2010 EV_{84}	—	February 16, 2010	Mount Lemmon	Mount Lemmon Survey	MAS	660 m	MPC · JPL
548211	2010 ER_{85}	—	September 10, 2007	Mount Lemmon	Mount Lemmon Survey	EOS	1.3 km	MPC · JPL
548212	2010 ET_{85}	—	March 13, 2010	Catalina	CSS	·	1.2 km	MPC · JPL
548213	2010 ET_{88}	—	March 14, 2010	Mount Lemmon	Mount Lemmon Survey	·	2.2 km	MPC · JPL
548214	2010 ES_{90}	—	October 20, 2007	Kitt Peak	Spacewatch	THM	2.3 km	MPC · JPL
548215	2010 EE_{91}	—	September 15, 2002	Palomar	NEAT	EOS	2.3 km	MPC · JPL
548216	2010 EQ_{91}	—	February 13, 2010	Mount Lemmon	Mount Lemmon Survey	NYS	730 m	MPC · JPL
548217	2010 EA_{92}	—	January 7, 2006	Kitt Peak	Spacewatch	·	1.3 km	MPC · JPL
548218	2010 EO_{92}	—	March 14, 2010	Mount Lemmon	Mount Lemmon Survey	MAS	720 m	MPC · JPL
548219	2010 EH_{93}	—	March 14, 2010	Mount Lemmon	Mount Lemmon Survey	·	2.4 km	MPC · JPL
548220	2010 EJ_{95}	—	March 14, 2010	Mount Lemmon	Mount Lemmon Survey	·	1.9 km	MPC · JPL
548221	2010 EN_{95}	—	April 9, 2003	Palomar	NEAT	NYS	1.0 km	MPC · JPL
548222	2010 ET_{95}	—	March 14, 2010	Mount Lemmon	Mount Lemmon Survey	·	750 m	MPC · JPL
548223	2010 EG_{97}	—	January 30, 2006	Kitt Peak	Spacewatch	·	1.2 km	MPC · JPL
548224	2010 EO_{97}	—	March 14, 2010	Mount Lemmon	Mount Lemmon Survey	·	2.7 km	MPC · JPL
548225	2010 EJ_{101}	—	October 9, 2008	Goodricke-Pigott	R. A. Tucker	V	710 m	MPC · JPL
548226	2010 ET_{106}	—	July 18, 2007	Mount Lemmon	Mount Lemmon Survey	NYS	1.0 km	MPC · JPL
548227	2010 EP_{107}	—	March 12, 2010	Mount Lemmon	Mount Lemmon Survey	·	1.2 km	MPC · JPL
548228	2010 ER_{111}	—	March 12, 2010	Kitt Peak	Spacewatch	TIR	2.7 km	MPC · JPL
548229	2010 EA_{112}	—	March 12, 2010	Kitt Peak	Spacewatch	·	1.1 km	MPC · JPL
548230	2010 ES_{112}	—	March 13, 2010	Kitt Peak	Spacewatch	THM	1.9 km	MPC · JPL
548231	2010 EA_{113}	—	January 8, 2010	Kitt Peak	Spacewatch	·	2.4 km	MPC · JPL
548232	2010 EJ_{120}	—	September 14, 2007	Mount Lemmon	Mount Lemmon Survey	·	1.0 km	MPC · JPL
548233	2010 EM_{120}	—	March 12, 2010	Mount Lemmon	Mount Lemmon Survey	·	1.9 km	MPC · JPL
548234	2010 EX_{120}	—	March 13, 2010	Kitt Peak	Spacewatch	·	3.2 km	MPC · JPL
548235	2010 ER_{122}	—	November 22, 2006	Kitt Peak	Spacewatch	3:2	5.7 km	MPC · JPL
548236	2010 EM_{123}	—	March 15, 2010	Kitt Peak	Spacewatch	·	3.7 km	MPC · JPL
548237	2010 EO_{124}	—	March 12, 2010	Kitt Peak	Spacewatch	H	560 m	MPC · JPL
548238	2010 ER_{125}	—	September 24, 2008	Mount Lemmon	Mount Lemmon Survey	TIR	3.3 km	MPC · JPL
548239	2010 EH_{128}	—	March 12, 2010	Kitt Peak	Spacewatch	NYS	1.0 km	MPC · JPL
548240	2010 EZ_{128}	—	March 12, 2010	Kitt Peak	Spacewatch	H	470 m	MPC · JPL
548241	2010 EC_{130}	—	March 13, 2010	Kitt Peak	Spacewatch	·	1.1 km	MPC · JPL
548242	2010 ET_{130}	—	March 13, 2010	Kitt Peak	Spacewatch	·	1.3 km	MPC · JPL
548243	2010 EE_{136}	—	April 26, 2003	Kitt Peak	Spacewatch	·	760 m	MPC · JPL
548244	2010 EL_{136}	—	February 14, 2010	Kitt Peak	Spacewatch	·	2.7 km	MPC · JPL
548245	2010 EE_{142}	—	May 26, 2003	Kitt Peak	Spacewatch	·	960 m	MPC · JPL
548246	2010 EH_{142}	—	January 22, 2006	Mount Lemmon	Mount Lemmon Survey	·	1.1 km	MPC · JPL
548247	2010 EK_{142}	—	March 15, 2010	Kitt Peak	Spacewatch	·	2.7 km	MPC · JPL
548248	2010 ER_{142}	—	May 1, 2003	Kitt Peak	Spacewatch	MAS	590 m	MPC · JPL
548249	2010 ES_{142}	—	February 18, 2010	Mount Lemmon	Mount Lemmon Survey	THM	2.0 km	MPC · JPL
548250	2010 ET_{171}	—	March 13, 2010	Catalina	CSS	·	2.2 km	MPC · JPL
548251	2010 EE_{173}	—	March 12, 2010	Kitt Peak	Spacewatch	·	930 m	MPC · JPL
548252	2010 EK_{173}	—	March 12, 2010	Mount Lemmon	Mount Lemmon Survey	THM	1.8 km	MPC · JPL
548253	2010 EP_{178}	—	October 8, 2008	Mount Lemmon	Mount Lemmon Survey	·	3.4 km	MPC · JPL
548254	2010 EW_{187}	—	March 15, 2010	Mount Lemmon	Mount Lemmon Survey	MAS	640 m	MPC · JPL
548255	2010 EC_{188}	—	March 13, 2010	Mount Lemmon	Mount Lemmon Survey	LIX	2.6 km	MPC · JPL
548256	2010 EJ_{188}	—	March 12, 2010	Kitt Peak	Spacewatch	·	2.1 km	MPC · JPL
548257	2010 ES_{188}	—	March 12, 2010	Catalina	CSS	·	2.3 km	MPC · JPL
548258	2010 EK_{189}	—	March 12, 2010	Kitt Peak	Spacewatch	·	1.3 km	MPC · JPL
548259	2010 EP_{190}	—	March 12, 2010	Kitt Peak	Spacewatch	VER	2.5 km	MPC · JPL
548260	2010 FH_{2}	—	December 28, 2008	Piszkéstető	K. Sárneczky	·	2.2 km	MPC · JPL
548261	2010 FG_{5}	—	February 17, 2010	Kitt Peak	Spacewatch	·	2.3 km	MPC · JPL
548262	2010 FH_{7}	—	September 14, 2007	Mount Lemmon	Mount Lemmon Survey	EOS	1.9 km	MPC · JPL
548263 Alexandertutov	2010 FD_{10}	Alexandertutov	March 19, 2010	Zelenchukskaya Stn	T. V. Krjačko, Satovski, B.	·	2.1 km	MPC · JPL
548264	2010 FC_{11}	—	March 16, 2010	Kitt Peak	Spacewatch	·	2.9 km	MPC · JPL
548265	2010 FW_{12}	—	November 7, 2005	Mauna Kea	A. Boattini	NYS	1.0 km	MPC · JPL
548266	2010 FC_{13}	—	March 16, 2010	Kitt Peak	Spacewatch	·	950 m	MPC · JPL
548267	2010 FW_{13}	—	March 17, 2010	Kitt Peak	Spacewatch	·	2.9 km	MPC · JPL
548268	2010 FL_{14}	—	March 17, 2010	Kitt Peak	Spacewatch	·	1.1 km	MPC · JPL
548269	2010 FT_{14}	—	February 16, 2010	Mount Lemmon	Mount Lemmon Survey	·	2.9 km	MPC · JPL
548270	2010 FR_{17}	—	April 1, 2005	Kitt Peak	Spacewatch	·	2.3 km	MPC · JPL
548271	2010 FU_{17}	—	October 14, 2001	Apache Point	SDSS Collaboration	·	2.3 km	MPC · JPL
548272	2010 FV_{17}	—	November 17, 2008	Kitt Peak	Spacewatch	·	1.7 km	MPC · JPL
548273	2010 FD_{18}	—	February 18, 2010	Kitt Peak	Spacewatch	VER	2.4 km	MPC · JPL
548274	2010 FZ_{20}	—	March 18, 2010	Mount Lemmon	Mount Lemmon Survey	EOS	1.5 km	MPC · JPL
548275	2010 FL_{21}	—	March 18, 2010	Mount Lemmon	Mount Lemmon Survey	EOS	1.5 km	MPC · JPL
548276	2010 FV_{21}	—	September 23, 2008	Mount Lemmon	Mount Lemmon Survey	·	1.0 km	MPC · JPL
548277	2010 FO_{22}	—	February 13, 2010	Mount Lemmon	Mount Lemmon Survey	EOS	2.2 km	MPC · JPL
548278	2010 FF_{23}	—	August 28, 2001	Kitt Peak	Spacewatch	EOS	1.7 km	MPC · JPL
548279	2010 FT_{26}	—	March 19, 2010	Mount Lemmon	Mount Lemmon Survey	·	2.7 km	MPC · JPL
548280	2010 FY_{26}	—	January 30, 2006	Kitt Peak	Spacewatch	MAS	770 m	MPC · JPL
548281	2010 FL_{27}	—	March 20, 2010	Mount Lemmon	Mount Lemmon Survey	·	2.7 km	MPC · JPL
548282	2010 FE_{29}	—	March 20, 2010	Mount Lemmon	Mount Lemmon Survey	·	910 m	MPC · JPL
548283	2010 FE_{30}	—	March 17, 2004	Kitt Peak	Spacewatch	·	2.3 km	MPC · JPL
548284	2010 FB_{31}	—	March 17, 2010	Kitt Peak	Spacewatch	·	1.1 km	MPC · JPL
548285	2010 FD_{56}	—	March 19, 2010	Kitt Peak	Spacewatch	·	1.2 km	MPC · JPL
548286	2010 FY_{87}	—	March 19, 2010	Mount Lemmon	Mount Lemmon Survey	·	2.5 km	MPC · JPL
548287	2010 FY_{89}	—	April 7, 2005	Kitt Peak	Spacewatch	HYG	2.8 km	MPC · JPL
548288	2010 FZ_{89}	—	March 19, 2010	Kitt Peak	Spacewatch	·	1.1 km	MPC · JPL
548289	2010 FH_{94}	—	March 19, 2010	Kitt Peak	Spacewatch	·	2.0 km	MPC · JPL
548290	2010 FA_{96}	—	September 12, 2007	Mount Lemmon	Mount Lemmon Survey	VER	2.4 km	MPC · JPL
548291	2010 FK_{97}	—	March 17, 2010	Kitt Peak	Spacewatch	·	950 m	MPC · JPL
548292	2010 FU_{98}	—	November 7, 2005	Mauna Kea	A. Boattini	·	1.0 km	MPC · JPL
548293	2010 FW_{98}	—	September 21, 1995	Kitt Peak	Spacewatch	EOS	2.2 km	MPC · JPL
548294	2010 FK_{99}	—	September 11, 2004	Kitt Peak	Spacewatch	V	520 m	MPC · JPL
548295	2010 FQ_{99}	—	October 8, 2008	Kitt Peak	Spacewatch	·	860 m	MPC · JPL
548296	2010 FX_{99}	—	February 1, 2006	Mount Lemmon	Mount Lemmon Survey	·	980 m	MPC · JPL
548297	2010 FK_{100}	—	March 14, 2010	Kitt Peak	Spacewatch	·	2.4 km	MPC · JPL
548298	2010 FM_{121}	—	March 18, 2010	Palomar	Palomar Transient Factory	·	3.2 km	MPC · JPL
548299	2010 FZ_{122}	—	March 15, 2004	Kitt Peak	Spacewatch	·	2.6 km	MPC · JPL
548300	2010 FA_{123}	—	March 18, 2010	Mount Lemmon	Mount Lemmon Survey	·	2.4 km	MPC · JPL

== 548301–548400 ==
back to top

Designation			Discovery			Properties		Ref
Permanent	Provisional	Named after	Date	Site	Discoverer(s)	Category	Diam.	Ref
548301	2010 FD_{138}	—	March 19, 2010	Mount Lemmon	Mount Lemmon Survey	(895)	3.1 km	MPC · JPL
548302	2010 FM_{138}	—	January 22, 2015	Haleakala	Pan-STARRS 1	·	2.1 km	MPC · JPL
548303	2010 FR_{138}	—	March 18, 2010	Mount Lemmon	Mount Lemmon Survey	·	2.1 km	MPC · JPL
548304	2010 FB_{140}	—	October 23, 2013	Haleakala	Pan-STARRS 1	·	2.5 km	MPC · JPL
548305	2010 FQ_{140}	—	January 23, 2015	Haleakala	Pan-STARRS 1	·	2.0 km	MPC · JPL
548306	2010 FS_{140}	—	May 4, 2014	Mount Lemmon	Mount Lemmon Survey	·	1.0 km	MPC · JPL
548307	2010 FY_{140}	—	February 24, 2014	Haleakala	Pan-STARRS 1	·	1.2 km	MPC · JPL
548308	2010 FN_{141}	—	October 8, 2012	Mount Lemmon	Mount Lemmon Survey	·	1.1 km	MPC · JPL
548309	2010 FV_{141}	—	January 18, 2016	Haleakala	Pan-STARRS 1	EUP	2.4 km	MPC · JPL
548310	2010 FE_{142}	—	March 25, 2010	Mount Lemmon	Mount Lemmon Survey	·	2.8 km	MPC · JPL
548311	2010 FV_{142}	—	March 18, 2010	Kitt Peak	Spacewatch	·	1.1 km	MPC · JPL
548312	2010 FW_{142}	—	March 18, 2010	Mount Lemmon	Mount Lemmon Survey	·	970 m	MPC · JPL
548313	2010 FV_{143}	—	March 21, 2010	Mount Lemmon	Mount Lemmon Survey	·	930 m	MPC · JPL
548314	2010 FB_{144}	—	March 19, 2010	Mount Lemmon	Mount Lemmon Survey	·	1.6 km	MPC · JPL
548315	2010 GB_{7}	—	August 20, 2006	Palomar	NEAT	·	540 m	MPC · JPL
548316	2010 GP_{7}	—	April 5, 2010	Kitt Peak	Spacewatch	·	1.3 km	MPC · JPL
548317	2010 GW_{24}	—	April 7, 2010	La Sagra	OAM	PHO	930 m	MPC · JPL
548318	2010 GW_{25}	—	March 4, 2006	Kitt Peak	Spacewatch	NYS	920 m	MPC · JPL
548319	2010 GQ_{27}	—	September 12, 2007	Kitt Peak	Spacewatch	·	1.3 km	MPC · JPL
548320	2010 GD_{30}	—	September 26, 1995	Kitt Peak	Spacewatch	·	1.3 km	MPC · JPL
548321	2010 GK_{35}	—	March 14, 2010	Kitt Peak	Spacewatch	·	1.3 km	MPC · JPL
548322	2010 GV_{35}	—	April 12, 2010	Mount Lemmon	Mount Lemmon Survey	·	2.2 km	MPC · JPL
548323	2010 GE_{67}	—	April 12, 2010	Mount Lemmon	Mount Lemmon Survey	·	960 m	MPC · JPL
548324	2010 GC_{99}	—	October 18, 2007	Kitt Peak	Spacewatch	EOS	1.8 km	MPC · JPL
548325	2010 GO_{100}	—	September 17, 2006	Kitt Peak	Spacewatch	·	2.6 km	MPC · JPL
548326	2010 GV_{100}	—	November 18, 2008	Kitt Peak	Spacewatch	V	700 m	MPC · JPL
548327	2010 GS_{102}	—	April 6, 2010	Mount Lemmon	Mount Lemmon Survey	·	2.2 km	MPC · JPL
548328	2010 GG_{103}	—	November 18, 2007	Mount Lemmon	Mount Lemmon Survey	·	2.1 km	MPC · JPL
548329	2010 GC_{106}	—	October 6, 2007	Bergisch Gladbach	W. Bickel	·	2.1 km	MPC · JPL
548330	2010 GE_{108}	—	October 19, 2000	Kitt Peak	Spacewatch	·	1.7 km	MPC · JPL
548331	2010 GD_{111}	—	January 17, 2004	Palomar	NEAT	·	3.1 km	MPC · JPL
548332	2010 GK_{112}	—	April 10, 2010	Kitt Peak	Spacewatch	·	3.3 km	MPC · JPL
548333	2010 GH_{114}	—	October 20, 2007	Mount Lemmon	Mount Lemmon Survey	·	3.0 km	MPC · JPL
548334	2010 GJ_{114}	—	November 7, 2005	Mauna Kea	A. Boattini	NYS	1.0 km	MPC · JPL
548335	2010 GO_{116}	—	November 4, 2007	Mount Lemmon	Mount Lemmon Survey	·	2.3 km	MPC · JPL
548336	2010 GQ_{120}	—	April 11, 2010	Kitt Peak	Spacewatch	·	2.9 km	MPC · JPL
548337	2010 GE_{123}	—	December 2, 2005	Mauna Kea	A. Boattini	·	1.1 km	MPC · JPL
548338	2010 GM_{127}	—	April 10, 2010	Kitt Peak	Spacewatch	·	2.8 km	MPC · JPL
548339	2010 GP_{127}	—	April 10, 2010	Kitt Peak	Spacewatch	·	3.1 km	MPC · JPL
548340	2010 GC_{128}	—	March 26, 2004	Kitt Peak	Spacewatch	·	2.7 km	MPC · JPL
548341	2010 GN_{128}	—	April 4, 2010	Kitt Peak	Spacewatch	ELF	3.3 km	MPC · JPL
548342	2010 GR_{128}	—	April 4, 2010	Kitt Peak	Spacewatch	·	2.1 km	MPC · JPL
548343	2010 GZ_{128}	—	April 5, 2010	Kitt Peak	Spacewatch	·	1.2 km	MPC · JPL
548344	2010 GS_{130}	—	March 12, 2010	Kitt Peak	Spacewatch	THM	2.0 km	MPC · JPL
548345	2010 GX_{132}	—	April 10, 2010	Mount Lemmon	Mount Lemmon Survey	·	3.1 km	MPC · JPL
548346	2010 GE_{133}	—	April 11, 2010	Mount Lemmon	Mount Lemmon Survey	THM	2.3 km	MPC · JPL
548347	2010 GP_{134}	—	October 2, 2006	Catalina	CSS	(22805)	2.9 km	MPC · JPL
548348	2010 GN_{136}	—	September 16, 2006	Catalina	CSS	·	3.1 km	MPC · JPL
548349	2010 GW_{138}	—	March 20, 2010	Mount Lemmon	Mount Lemmon Survey	·	990 m	MPC · JPL
548350	2010 GH_{142}	—	April 9, 2010	Mount Lemmon	Mount Lemmon Survey	·	1.5 km	MPC · JPL
548351	2010 GT_{144}	—	November 2, 2008	Mount Lemmon	Mount Lemmon Survey	·	1.9 km	MPC · JPL
548352	2010 GX_{146}	—	August 23, 2001	Kitt Peak	Spacewatch	·	1.8 km	MPC · JPL
548353	2010 GE_{157}	—	July 18, 2007	Mount Lemmon	Mount Lemmon Survey	·	1.1 km	MPC · JPL
548354	2010 GM_{161}	—	April 12, 2010	Mount Lemmon	Mount Lemmon Survey	·	2.9 km	MPC · JPL
548355	2010 GY_{161}	—	April 14, 2010	Catalina	CSS	·	940 m	MPC · JPL
548356	2010 GR_{171}	—	April 4, 2010	Palomar	Palomar Transient Factory	·	2.4 km	MPC · JPL
548357	2010 GY_{171}	—	May 8, 2005	Catalina	CSS	·	2.6 km	MPC · JPL
548358	2010 GO_{172}	—	February 13, 2004	Kitt Peak	Spacewatch	EOS	2.5 km	MPC · JPL
548359	2010 GP_{172}	—	October 20, 2007	Kitt Peak	Spacewatch	·	2.8 km	MPC · JPL
548360	2010 GJ_{173}	—	April 6, 2005	Mount Lemmon	Mount Lemmon Survey	·	2.7 km	MPC · JPL
548361	2010 GR_{174}	—	April 10, 2010	Mount Lemmon	Mount Lemmon Survey	·	780 m	MPC · JPL
548362	2010 GT_{176}	—	April 15, 2010	Mount Lemmon	Mount Lemmon Survey	·	2.6 km	MPC · JPL
548363	2010 GV_{176}	—	February 2, 2006	Kitt Peak	Spacewatch	·	1.0 km	MPC · JPL
548364	2010 GV_{182}	—	April 3, 2016	Haleakala	Pan-STARRS 1	EOS	1.6 km	MPC · JPL
548365	2010 GF_{187}	—	November 26, 2014	Haleakala	Pan-STARRS 1	·	1.8 km	MPC · JPL
548366	2010 GB_{199}	—	January 22, 2015	Haleakala	Pan-STARRS 1	HYG	2.5 km	MPC · JPL
548367	2010 GJ_{199}	—	May 20, 2014	Haleakala	Pan-STARRS 1	·	1.1 km	MPC · JPL
548368	2010 GN_{199}	—	April 9, 2010	Mount Lemmon	Mount Lemmon Survey	·	970 m	MPC · JPL
548369	2010 GX_{199}	—	April 11, 2010	Mount Lemmon	Mount Lemmon Survey	·	1.1 km	MPC · JPL
548370	2010 GY_{199}	—	April 9, 2010	Kitt Peak	Spacewatch	EUN	970 m	MPC · JPL
548371	2010 GK_{200}	—	December 31, 2012	Haleakala	Pan-STARRS 1	EUN	880 m	MPC · JPL
548372	2010 GG_{201}	—	December 23, 2012	Haleakala	Pan-STARRS 1	·	990 m	MPC · JPL
548373	2010 GM_{202}	—	February 10, 2016	Haleakala	Pan-STARRS 1	ELF	3.5 km	MPC · JPL
548374	2010 GU_{202}	—	April 4, 2010	Kitt Peak	Spacewatch	MAS	610 m	MPC · JPL
548375	2010 GC_{203}	—	October 26, 2013	Kitt Peak	Spacewatch	·	2.4 km	MPC · JPL
548376	2010 GE_{203}	—	November 27, 2013	Haleakala	Pan-STARRS 1	·	3.4 km	MPC · JPL
548377	2010 GX_{203}	—	February 16, 2015	Haleakala	Pan-STARRS 1	·	2.3 km	MPC · JPL
548378	2010 GP_{204}	—	September 8, 2011	Kitt Peak	Spacewatch	MAS	590 m	MPC · JPL
548379	2010 GA_{205}	—	January 16, 2017	Haleakala	Pan-STARRS 1	PHO	750 m	MPC · JPL
548380	2010 GG_{205}	—	April 7, 2010	Kitt Peak	Spacewatch	·	1.1 km	MPC · JPL
548381	2010 GD_{206}	—	April 9, 2010	Mount Lemmon	Mount Lemmon Survey	·	2.8 km	MPC · JPL
548382	2010 GE_{206}	—	April 12, 2010	Mount Lemmon	Mount Lemmon Survey	THM	1.9 km	MPC · JPL
548383	2010 GG_{206}	—	April 9, 2010	Kitt Peak	Spacewatch	·	2.6 km	MPC · JPL
548384	2010 GM_{206}	—	October 19, 2006	Kitt Peak	Deep Ecliptic Survey	·	2.0 km	MPC · JPL
548385	2010 HX_{17}	—	November 20, 2003	Apache Point	SDSS Collaboration	·	2.3 km	MPC · JPL
548386	2010 HA_{27}	—	April 19, 2010	WISE	WISE	·	3.8 km	MPC · JPL
548387	2010 HZ_{76}	—	April 17, 2010	Mount Lemmon	Mount Lemmon Survey	·	970 m	MPC · JPL
548388	2010 HC_{77}	—	September 26, 1995	Kitt Peak	Spacewatch	·	780 m	MPC · JPL
548389	2010 HH_{77}	—	October 28, 2008	Mount Lemmon	Mount Lemmon Survey	·	1.1 km	MPC · JPL
548390	2010 HB_{106}	—	February 27, 2006	Kitt Peak	Spacewatch	MAS	630 m	MPC · JPL
548391	2010 HK_{106}	—	April 20, 2010	Kitt Peak	Spacewatch	·	1.2 km	MPC · JPL
548392	2010 HN_{106}	—	November 1, 2007	Kitt Peak	Spacewatch	·	3.3 km	MPC · JPL
548393	2010 HK_{120}	—	January 26, 2015	Haleakala	Pan-STARRS 1	TRE	2.1 km	MPC · JPL
548394	2010 HV_{123}	—	June 3, 2008	Mount Lemmon	Mount Lemmon Survey	PHO	1.1 km	MPC · JPL
548395	2010 HL_{129}	—	February 1, 2005	Kitt Peak	Spacewatch	·	2.4 km	MPC · JPL
548396	2010 HX_{139}	—	April 20, 2010	Mount Lemmon	Mount Lemmon Survey	·	1.3 km	MPC · JPL
548397	2010 JG_{2}	—	July 18, 2007	Mount Lemmon	Mount Lemmon Survey	MAS	680 m	MPC · JPL
548398	2010 JM_{29}	—	April 10, 2010	Mount Lemmon	Mount Lemmon Survey	·	2.6 km	MPC · JPL
548399	2010 JF_{30}	—	May 3, 2010	Kitt Peak	Spacewatch	·	3.0 km	MPC · JPL
548400	2010 JT_{30}	—	May 4, 2010	Charleston	R. Holmes	·	1.2 km	MPC · JPL

== 548401–548500 ==
back to top

Designation			Discovery			Properties		Ref
Permanent	Provisional	Named after	Date	Site	Discoverer(s)	Category	Diam.	Ref
548401	2010 JP_{31}	—	May 5, 2010	Mount Lemmon	Mount Lemmon Survey	·	960 m	MPC · JPL
548402	2010 JX_{31}	—	May 7, 2010	Mount Lemmon	Mount Lemmon Survey	·	3.4 km	MPC · JPL
548403	2010 JY_{31}	—	May 6, 2010	Mount Lemmon	Mount Lemmon Survey	·	1.5 km	MPC · JPL
548404	2010 JC_{35}	—	February 13, 2009	Mount Lemmon	Mount Lemmon Survey	URS	3.5 km	MPC · JPL
548405	2010 JN_{36}	—	March 3, 2006	Kitt Peak	Spacewatch	NYS	940 m	MPC · JPL
548406	2010 JO_{37}	—	April 10, 2010	Mount Lemmon	Mount Lemmon Survey	·	2.7 km	MPC · JPL
548407	2010 JQ_{39}	—	September 14, 2005	Kitt Peak	Spacewatch	H	480 m	MPC · JPL
548408	2010 JR_{44}	—	May 6, 2010	Mount Lemmon	Mount Lemmon Survey	·	1.9 km	MPC · JPL
548409	2010 JP_{46}	—	April 14, 2004	Catalina	CSS	TIR	3.3 km	MPC · JPL
548410	2010 JA_{47}	—	May 9, 2010	Mount Lemmon	Mount Lemmon Survey	·	2.9 km	MPC · JPL
548411	2010 JK_{47}	—	May 10, 2010	Mount Lemmon	Mount Lemmon Survey	·	540 m	MPC · JPL
548412	2010 JO_{47}	—	October 9, 2007	Mount Lemmon	Mount Lemmon Survey	·	1.1 km	MPC · JPL
548413	2010 JJ_{49}	—	June 21, 2001	Palomar	NEAT	·	2.1 km	MPC · JPL
548414	2010 JR_{71}	—	March 26, 2003	Palomar	NEAT	·	790 m	MPC · JPL
548415	2010 JJ_{72}	—	February 2, 2009	Kitt Peak	Spacewatch	·	2.3 km	MPC · JPL
548416	2010 JK_{74}	—	May 11, 2010	Mount Lemmon	Mount Lemmon Survey	·	2.4 km	MPC · JPL
548417	2010 JL_{74}	—	January 20, 2009	Kitt Peak	Spacewatch	THM	2.1 km	MPC · JPL
548418	2010 JQ_{74}	—	April 21, 2006	Kitt Peak	Spacewatch	·	1.0 km	MPC · JPL
548419	2010 JK_{75}	—	May 3, 2010	Kitt Peak	Spacewatch	·	1.2 km	MPC · JPL
548420	2010 JQ_{76}	—	January 16, 2009	Mount Lemmon	Mount Lemmon Survey	GEF	1.2 km	MPC · JPL
548421	2010 JS_{79}	—	May 12, 2010	Kitt Peak	Spacewatch	·	1.3 km	MPC · JPL
548422	2010 JH_{85}	—	May 11, 2010	Mount Lemmon	Mount Lemmon Survey	·	2.3 km	MPC · JPL
548423	2010 JS_{110}	—	October 2, 2006	Mount Lemmon	Mount Lemmon Survey	·	3.5 km	MPC · JPL
548424	2010 JF_{111}	—	September 15, 2007	Mount Lemmon	Mount Lemmon Survey	·	3.3 km	MPC · JPL
548425	2010 JD_{119}	—	August 12, 2006	Palomar	NEAT	·	1.9 km	MPC · JPL
548426	2010 JZ_{120}	—	May 12, 2010	Kitt Peak	Spacewatch	·	2.7 km	MPC · JPL
548427	2010 JT_{121}	—	May 12, 2010	Mount Lemmon	Mount Lemmon Survey	TIR	2.8 km	MPC · JPL
548428	2010 JP_{122}	—	March 30, 2004	Kitt Peak	Spacewatch	·	3.8 km	MPC · JPL
548429	2010 JN_{149}	—	May 6, 2010	Mount Lemmon	Mount Lemmon Survey	·	1.3 km	MPC · JPL
548430	2010 JS_{150}	—	March 9, 2004	Palomar	NEAT	TIR	3.4 km	MPC · JPL
548431	2010 JG_{152}	—	February 25, 2006	Kitt Peak	Spacewatch	·	1.2 km	MPC · JPL
548432	2010 JG_{153}	—	September 19, 2003	Campo Imperatore	CINEOS	NYS	1.2 km	MPC · JPL
548433	2010 JD_{154}	—	April 8, 2010	Mount Lemmon	Mount Lemmon Survey	·	2.7 km	MPC · JPL
548434	2010 JU_{156}	—	November 3, 2007	Kitt Peak	Spacewatch	·	3.4 km	MPC · JPL
548435	2010 JX_{157}	—	May 13, 2010	Kitt Peak	Spacewatch	·	2.2 km	MPC · JPL
548436	2010 JZ_{158}	—	May 4, 2010	Kitt Peak	Spacewatch	·	2.2 km	MPC · JPL
548437	2010 JE_{159}	—	April 9, 2010	Mount Lemmon	Mount Lemmon Survey	V	480 m	MPC · JPL
548438	2010 JT_{159}	—	December 23, 2012	Haleakala	Pan-STARRS 1	·	1.0 km	MPC · JPL
548439	2010 JG_{162}	—	October 9, 2004	Kitt Peak	Spacewatch	·	1.3 km	MPC · JPL
548440	2010 JG_{163}	—	October 10, 2007	Kitt Peak	Spacewatch	·	1.2 km	MPC · JPL
548441	2010 JL_{163}	—	March 14, 2010	Kitt Peak	Spacewatch	·	3.2 km	MPC · JPL
548442	2010 JM_{163}	—	October 11, 2007	Kitt Peak	Spacewatch	·	3.4 km	MPC · JPL
548443	2010 JA_{166}	—	January 10, 2013	Haleakala	Pan-STARRS 1	·	1.0 km	MPC · JPL
548444	2010 JW_{166}	—	September 10, 2007	Kitt Peak	Spacewatch	·	1.1 km	MPC · JPL
548445	2010 JZ_{169}	—	January 25, 2009	Kitt Peak	Spacewatch	·	3.2 km	MPC · JPL
548446	2010 JH_{171}	—	December 5, 2008	Kitt Peak	Spacewatch	·	2.1 km	MPC · JPL
548447	2010 JD_{175}	—	April 11, 2010	Mount Lemmon	Mount Lemmon Survey	·	1.3 km	MPC · JPL
548448	2010 JT_{175}	—	May 13, 2010	Kitt Peak	Spacewatch	·	2.2 km	MPC · JPL
548449	2010 JW_{177}	—	February 11, 2004	Palomar	NEAT	EOS	2.5 km	MPC · JPL
548450	2010 JA_{178}	—	December 4, 2008	Kitt Peak	Spacewatch	·	2.3 km	MPC · JPL
548451	2010 JK_{178}	—	October 6, 2008	Mount Lemmon	Mount Lemmon Survey	V	680 m	MPC · JPL
548452	2010 JU_{186}	—	September 5, 2008	Kitt Peak	Spacewatch	THB	2.0 km	MPC · JPL
548453	2010 JZ_{196}	—	September 23, 2008	Kitt Peak	Spacewatch	·	2.1 km	MPC · JPL
548454	2010 JX_{201}	—	January 16, 2015	Haleakala	Pan-STARRS 1	·	2.4 km	MPC · JPL
548455	2010 JO_{204}	—	July 28, 2015	Haleakala	Pan-STARRS 1	·	1.6 km	MPC · JPL
548456	2010 JT_{210}	—	May 11, 2010	Mount Lemmon	Mount Lemmon Survey	·	1.2 km	MPC · JPL
548457	2010 JW_{210}	—	October 18, 2011	Mount Lemmon	Mount Lemmon Survey	·	460 m	MPC · JPL
548458	2010 JM_{211}	—	September 29, 2011	Mount Lemmon	Mount Lemmon Survey	H	400 m	MPC · JPL
548459	2010 JK_{212}	—	October 12, 2013	Kitt Peak	Spacewatch	·	2.8 km	MPC · JPL
548460	2010 JP_{212}	—	January 11, 2018	Haleakala	Pan-STARRS 1	·	1.5 km	MPC · JPL
548461	2010 JY_{212}	—	December 9, 2015	Haleakala	Pan-STARRS 1	·	970 m	MPC · JPL
548462	2010 JQ_{213}	—	January 16, 2018	Haleakala	Pan-STARRS 1	·	1.2 km	MPC · JPL
548463	2010 JS_{213}	—	August 26, 2011	Kitt Peak	Spacewatch	·	1.6 km	MPC · JPL
548464	2010 JM_{214}	—	May 11, 2010	Mount Lemmon	Mount Lemmon Survey	·	1.0 km	MPC · JPL
548465	2010 JV_{214}	—	May 4, 2010	Kitt Peak	Spacewatch	·	2.7 km	MPC · JPL
548466	2010 JA_{215}	—	May 8, 2010	Mount Lemmon	Mount Lemmon Survey	·	2.1 km	MPC · JPL
548467	2010 KJ_{9}	—	April 9, 2010	Mount Lemmon	Mount Lemmon Survey	EUN	1.2 km	MPC · JPL
548468	2010 KP_{38}	—	May 4, 2010	Kitt Peak	Spacewatch	·	1.8 km	MPC · JPL
548469	2010 KV_{128}	—	October 16, 2007	Kitt Peak	Spacewatch	·	2.0 km	MPC · JPL
548470	2010 KX_{128}	—	November 13, 2007	Mount Lemmon	Mount Lemmon Survey	·	1.1 km	MPC · JPL
548471	2010 KA_{129}	—	May 20, 2010	Mount Lemmon	Mount Lemmon Survey	HNS	1.2 km	MPC · JPL
548472	2010 KM_{132}	—	April 1, 2016	Haleakala	Pan-STARRS 1	·	1.9 km	MPC · JPL
548473	2010 KY_{138}	—	October 3, 2013	Kitt Peak	Spacewatch	·	2.6 km	MPC · JPL
548474	2010 KE_{158}	—	January 28, 2015	Haleakala	Pan-STARRS 1	·	2.8 km	MPC · JPL
548475	2010 LJ_{34}	—	June 8, 2010	Kachina	Hobart, J.	·	3.8 km	MPC · JPL
548476	2010 LQ_{36}	—	July 5, 2002	Kitt Peak	Spacewatch	H	540 m	MPC · JPL
548477	2010 LA_{62}	—	October 8, 2007	Mount Lemmon	Mount Lemmon Survey	·	1.7 km	MPC · JPL
548478	2010 LU_{64}	—	April 2, 2006	Kitt Peak	Spacewatch	·	1.1 km	MPC · JPL
548479	2010 LO_{104}	—	December 15, 2007	Kitt Peak	Spacewatch	·	1.2 km	MPC · JPL
548480	2010 LL_{105}	—	May 5, 2010	Kitt Peak	Spacewatch	·	3.2 km	MPC · JPL
548481	2010 LR_{109}	—	October 15, 2007	Catalina	CSS	·	2.5 km	MPC · JPL
548482	2010 LK_{113}	—	September 28, 2003	Anderson Mesa	LONEOS	·	1.6 km	MPC · JPL
548483	2010 LJ_{133}	—	October 11, 2007	Lulin	LUSS	·	1.4 km	MPC · JPL
548484	2010 LN_{133}	—	November 17, 2007	Mount Lemmon	Mount Lemmon Survey	VER	3.0 km	MPC · JPL
548485	2010 LB_{134}	—	September 27, 2006	Bergisch Gladbach	W. Bickel	·	3.3 km	MPC · JPL
548486	2010 LN_{152}	—	November 27, 2013	Haleakala	Pan-STARRS 1	·	2.2 km	MPC · JPL
548487	2010 LH_{158}	—	November 27, 2013	Haleakala	Pan-STARRS 1	·	3.0 km	MPC · JPL
548488	2010 LM_{159}	—	June 13, 2010	Mount Lemmon	Mount Lemmon Survey	·	1.8 km	MPC · JPL
548489	2010 MA_{5}	—	June 17, 2010	Mount Lemmon	Mount Lemmon Survey	·	1.2 km	MPC · JPL
548490	2010 MV_{113}	—	June 17, 2010	Mount Lemmon	Mount Lemmon Survey	HYG	2.1 km	MPC · JPL
548491	2010 MB_{116}	—	May 7, 2010	Kitt Peak	Spacewatch	·	1.1 km	MPC · JPL
548492	2010 MO_{134}	—	October 9, 2013	Kitt Peak	Spacewatch	·	3.1 km	MPC · JPL
548493	2010 MS_{144}	—	October 12, 2016	Kitt Peak	Spacewatch	·	1.6 km	MPC · JPL
548494	2010 MB_{147}	—	October 23, 2011	Haleakala	Pan-STARRS 1	PHO	1.0 km	MPC · JPL
548495	2010 MK_{147}	—	January 19, 2016	Haleakala	Pan-STARRS 1	·	590 m	MPC · JPL
548496	2010 MU_{147}	—	January 19, 2013	Kitt Peak	Spacewatch	·	1.1 km	MPC · JPL
548497	2010 MQ_{148}	—	June 18, 2010	Mount Lemmon	Mount Lemmon Survey	H	530 m	MPC · JPL
548498	2010 NL_{2}	—	July 9, 2010	WISE	WISE	·	2.9 km	MPC · JPL
548499	2010 NU_{4}	—	June 18, 2010	Mount Lemmon	Mount Lemmon Survey	·	1.3 km	MPC · JPL
548500	2010 NS_{40}	—	November 18, 2007	Kitt Peak	Spacewatch	(1298)	2.6 km	MPC · JPL

== 548501–548600 ==
back to top

Designation			Discovery			Properties		Ref
Permanent	Provisional	Named after	Date	Site	Discoverer(s)	Category	Diam.	Ref
548501	2010 NN_{119}	—	February 18, 2015	Mount Lemmon	Mount Lemmon Survey	·	2.5 km	MPC · JPL
548502	2010 NK_{123}	—	April 12, 2010	Mount Lemmon	Mount Lemmon Survey	(69559)	2.3 km	MPC · JPL
548503	2010 NZ_{133}	—	December 23, 2012	Haleakala	Pan-STARRS 1	·	1.4 km	MPC · JPL
548504	2010 NF_{146}	—	July 1, 2010	Haleakala	Pan-STARRS 1	cubewano (cold)	185 km	MPC · JPL
548505	2010 NQ_{146}	—	September 21, 2011	Kitt Peak	Spacewatch	PHO	700 m	MPC · JPL
548506	2010 NE_{147}	—	August 8, 2015	Haleakala	Pan-STARRS 1	·	1.7 km	MPC · JPL
548507	2010 OT_{10}	—	March 20, 1999	Apache Point	SDSS Collaboration	·	2.4 km	MPC · JPL
548508	2010 OJ_{100}	—	July 21, 2010	Bisei	BATTeRS	·	1.7 km	MPC · JPL
548509	2010 OT_{137}	—	August 11, 2015	Haleakala	Pan-STARRS 1	·	2.4 km	MPC · JPL
548510	2010 OP_{141}	—	November 3, 2007	Mount Lemmon	Mount Lemmon Survey	EOS	1.7 km	MPC · JPL
548511	2010 OE_{142}	—	August 28, 2006	Kitt Peak	Spacewatch	VER	2.3 km	MPC · JPL
548512	2010 PA_{59}	—	August 7, 2010	XuYi	PMO NEO Survey Program	·	590 m	MPC · JPL
548513	2010 PJ_{64}	—	September 27, 2006	Catalina	CSS	·	1.7 km	MPC · JPL
548514	2010 PU_{73}	—	August 7, 2010	La Sagra	OAM	·	640 m	MPC · JPL
548515	2010 PH_{80}	—	July 31, 2005	Palomar	NEAT	·	1.9 km	MPC · JPL
548516	2010 PZ_{80}	—	August 15, 2010	Palomar	Palomar Transient Factory	H	560 m	MPC · JPL
548517	2010 PV_{81}	—	August 5, 2010	La Sagra	OAM	·	660 m	MPC · JPL
548518	2010 PL_{88}	—	August 3, 2010	XuYi	PMO NEO Survey Program	·	600 m	MPC · JPL
548519	2010 QK_{1}	—	August 20, 2010	Bergisch Gladbach	W. Bickel	·	1.7 km	MPC · JPL
548520	2010 QQ_{4}	—	September 6, 2005	Anderson Mesa	LONEOS	·	900 m	MPC · JPL
548521	2010 QZ_{6}	—	October 26, 2011	Haleakala	Pan-STARRS 1	·	5.0 km	MPC · JPL
548522	2010 RU_{7}	—	September 2, 2010	Mount Lemmon	Mount Lemmon Survey	·	600 m	MPC · JPL
548523	2010 RA_{18}	—	September 2, 2010	Mount Lemmon	Mount Lemmon Survey	·	510 m	MPC · JPL
548524	2010 RG_{40}	—	September 4, 2010	La Sagra	OAM	·	1.6 km	MPC · JPL
548525	2010 RH_{51}	—	September 4, 2010	Kitt Peak	Spacewatch	·	1.3 km	MPC · JPL
548526	2010 RE_{56}	—	September 5, 2010	Mount Lemmon	Mount Lemmon Survey	·	1.3 km	MPC · JPL
548527	2010 RN_{56}	—	September 5, 2010	Mount Lemmon	Mount Lemmon Survey	·	1.0 km	MPC · JPL
548528	2010 RD_{62}	—	September 7, 2010	La Sagra	OAM	·	1.7 km	MPC · JPL
548529	2010 RE_{63}	—	August 20, 2000	Kitt Peak	Spacewatch	·	580 m	MPC · JPL
548530	2010 RW_{63}	—	September 8, 2010	Charleston	R. Holmes	·	1.4 km	MPC · JPL
548531	2010 RJ_{70}	—	September 8, 2010	Plana	Fratev, F.	EOS	2.2 km	MPC · JPL
548532	2010 RX_{70}	—	September 9, 2010	Kitt Peak	Spacewatch	·	1.5 km	MPC · JPL
548533	2010 RA_{71}	—	September 2, 2010	Mount Lemmon	Mount Lemmon Survey	MAR	930 m	MPC · JPL
548534	2010 RR_{71}	—	September 9, 2010	La Sagra	OAM	BAP	740 m	MPC · JPL
548535	2010 RH_{72}	—	June 18, 2010	Kitt Peak	Spacewatch	·	1.5 km	MPC · JPL
548536	2010 RX_{72}	—	September 10, 2010	Mount Lemmon	Mount Lemmon Survey	·	880 m	MPC · JPL
548537	2010 RQ_{78}	—	September 2, 2010	Mount Lemmon	Mount Lemmon Survey	·	1.3 km	MPC · JPL
548538	2010 RZ_{84}	—	September 2, 2010	Mount Lemmon	Mount Lemmon Survey	·	990 m	MPC · JPL
548539	2010 RW_{87}	—	May 4, 2009	Mount Lemmon	Mount Lemmon Survey	·	980 m	MPC · JPL
548540	2010 RA_{92}	—	December 31, 2007	Mount Lemmon	Mount Lemmon Survey	·	1.3 km	MPC · JPL
548541	2010 RX_{101}	—	September 10, 2010	Kitt Peak	Spacewatch	·	490 m	MPC · JPL
548542	2010 RZ_{112}	—	October 19, 2006	Kitt Peak	Spacewatch	RAF	680 m	MPC · JPL
548543	2010 RW_{113}	—	September 2, 2010	Mount Lemmon	Mount Lemmon Survey	HNS	1.1 km	MPC · JPL
548544	2010 RM_{114}	—	August 6, 2010	Kitt Peak	Spacewatch	·	450 m	MPC · JPL
548545	2010 RQ_{115}	—	September 11, 2010	Catalina	CSS	ADE	1.7 km	MPC · JPL
548546	2010 RU_{115}	—	September 11, 2010	Kitt Peak	Spacewatch	·	1.2 km	MPC · JPL
548547	2010 RK_{119}	—	September 4, 2010	La Sagra	OAM	·	590 m	MPC · JPL
548548	2010 RC_{131}	—	September 10, 2010	Mount Lemmon	Mount Lemmon Survey	·	1.5 km	MPC · JPL
548549	2010 RG_{131}	—	September 10, 2010	Mount Lemmon	Mount Lemmon Survey	·	1.9 km	MPC · JPL
548550	2010 RH_{132}	—	March 12, 2008	Mount Lemmon	Mount Lemmon Survey	HNS	1.0 km	MPC · JPL
548551	2010 RL_{135}	—	September 5, 2010	La Sagra	OAM	·	1.8 km	MPC · JPL
548552	2010 RO_{143}	—	September 14, 2010	Kitt Peak	Spacewatch	·	1.4 km	MPC · JPL
548553	2010 RM_{145}	—	March 27, 2004	Kitt Peak	Spacewatch	·	1.7 km	MPC · JPL
548554	2010 RA_{146}	—	November 20, 2006	Kitt Peak	Spacewatch	·	1.5 km	MPC · JPL
548555	2010 RX_{152}	—	March 10, 2004	Palomar	NEAT	EUN	1.2 km	MPC · JPL
548556	2010 RY_{153}	—	February 12, 2003	Haleakala	NEAT	(1547)	1.7 km	MPC · JPL
548557	2010 RW_{157}	—	September 1, 2010	Mount Lemmon	Mount Lemmon Survey	EUN	900 m	MPC · JPL
548558	2010 RU_{163}	—	September 5, 2010	Mount Lemmon	Mount Lemmon Survey	·	1.6 km	MPC · JPL
548559	2010 RK_{165}	—	August 12, 2010	Kitt Peak	Spacewatch	·	590 m	MPC · JPL
548560	2010 RV_{171}	—	September 4, 2010	Kitt Peak	Spacewatch	·	520 m	MPC · JPL
548561	2010 RT_{175}	—	September 10, 2010	Kitt Peak	Spacewatch	·	1.8 km	MPC · JPL
548562	2010 RU_{178}	—	September 1, 2010	Mount Lemmon	Mount Lemmon Survey	·	490 m	MPC · JPL
548563	2010 RB_{180}	—	April 13, 2013	Mount Lemmon	Mount Lemmon Survey	ADE	1.4 km	MPC · JPL
548564	2010 RH_{182}	—	December 12, 2006	Kitt Peak	Spacewatch	·	1.5 km	MPC · JPL
548565	2010 RU_{183}	—	September 11, 2010	Palomar	Palomar Transient Factory	·	1.5 km	MPC · JPL
548566	2010 RQ_{188}	—	September 11, 2010	Mount Lemmon	Mount Lemmon Survey	·	1.9 km	MPC · JPL
548567	2010 RP_{191}	—	January 28, 2017	Haleakala	Pan-STARRS 1	·	1.1 km	MPC · JPL
548568	2010 RO_{193}	—	September 11, 2010	ESA OGS	ESA OGS	·	450 m	MPC · JPL
548569	2010 RH_{194}	—	September 9, 2015	Haleakala	Pan-STARRS 1	EOS	1.6 km	MPC · JPL
548570	2010 RM_{194}	—	November 10, 2015	Mount Lemmon	Mount Lemmon Survey	EUN	900 m	MPC · JPL
548571	2010 RA_{196}	—	September 14, 2010	Kitt Peak	Spacewatch	·	1.2 km	MPC · JPL
548572	2010 RW_{196}	—	September 3, 2010	Mount Lemmon	Mount Lemmon Survey	·	1.4 km	MPC · JPL
548573	2010 RA_{197}	—	September 11, 2010	Mount Lemmon	Mount Lemmon Survey	·	1.6 km	MPC · JPL
548574	2010 RX_{197}	—	December 3, 2015	Haleakala	Pan-STARRS 1	·	1.2 km	MPC · JPL
548575	2010 RF_{198}	—	February 13, 2012	Haleakala	Pan-STARRS 1	·	1.2 km	MPC · JPL
548576	2010 RS_{199}	—	September 2, 2010	Mount Lemmon	Mount Lemmon Survey	·	1.4 km	MPC · JPL
548577	2010 RB_{202}	—	September 10, 2010	Mount Lemmon	Mount Lemmon Survey	EOS	1.3 km	MPC · JPL
548578	2010 RT_{202}	—	November 30, 2011	Mount Lemmon	Mount Lemmon Survey	·	1.8 km	MPC · JPL
548579	2010 RU_{205}	—	September 4, 2010	Kitt Peak	Spacewatch	·	1.2 km	MPC · JPL
548580	2010 RW_{206}	—	September 4, 2010	Mount Lemmon	Mount Lemmon Survey	·	1.1 km	MPC · JPL
548581	2010 RA_{208}	—	September 15, 2010	Kitt Peak	Spacewatch	EOS	1.3 km	MPC · JPL
548582	2010 RY_{209}	—	September 15, 2010	Mount Lemmon	Mount Lemmon Survey	·	1.2 km	MPC · JPL
548583	2010 SM_{1}	—	December 14, 2006	Kitt Peak	Spacewatch	EOS	1.5 km	MPC · JPL
548584	2010 SS_{1}	—	September 16, 2010	Mount Lemmon	Mount Lemmon Survey	KON	1.8 km	MPC · JPL
548585	2010 SQ_{6}	—	September 16, 2010	Mount Lemmon	Mount Lemmon Survey	·	1.2 km	MPC · JPL
548586	2010 SO_{18}	—	October 19, 2006	Kitt Peak	Spacewatch	·	1.8 km	MPC · JPL
548587	2010 ST_{18}	—	September 14, 2010	Kitt Peak	Spacewatch	·	420 m	MPC · JPL
548588	2010 SD_{27}	—	September 29, 2010	Kitt Peak	Spacewatch	·	1.7 km	MPC · JPL
548589	2010 SO_{30}	—	September 6, 2010	La Sagra	OAM	·	860 m	MPC · JPL
548590	2010 SG_{34}	—	September 30, 2010	Catalina	CSS	·	2.2 km	MPC · JPL
548591	2010 SW_{37}	—	September 19, 2010	Kitt Peak	Spacewatch	·	1.4 km	MPC · JPL
548592	2010 SN_{38}	—	December 21, 2006	Kitt Peak	Spacewatch	EUN	1.2 km	MPC · JPL
548593	2010 SO_{42}	—	September 18, 2010	Mount Lemmon	Mount Lemmon Survey	·	910 m	MPC · JPL
548594	2010 SY_{43}	—	April 18, 2009	Mount Lemmon	Mount Lemmon Survey	(5)	1.1 km	MPC · JPL
548595	2010 SZ_{45}	—	September 18, 2010	Mount Lemmon	Mount Lemmon Survey	BRG	1.4 km	MPC · JPL
548596	2010 SA_{46}	—	September 18, 2010	Mount Lemmon	Mount Lemmon Survey	EOS	1.5 km	MPC · JPL
548597	2010 SC_{50}	—	September 17, 2010	Kitt Peak	Spacewatch	·	1.3 km	MPC · JPL
548598	2010 SN_{50}	—	January 29, 2012	Haleakala	Pan-STARRS 1	·	1.7 km	MPC · JPL
548599	2010 SB_{51}	—	September 29, 2010	Mount Lemmon	Mount Lemmon Survey	·	540 m	MPC · JPL
548600	2010 SS_{53}	—	August 21, 2014	Haleakala	Pan-STARRS 1	MAR	760 m	MPC · JPL

== 548601–548700 ==
back to top

Designation			Discovery			Properties		Ref
Permanent	Provisional	Named after	Date	Site	Discoverer(s)	Category	Diam.	Ref
548601	2010 SA_{55}	—	September 17, 2010	Kitt Peak	Spacewatch	·	470 m	MPC · JPL
548602	2010 TL_{2}	—	October 2, 2010	La Sagra	OAM	·	540 m	MPC · JPL
548603	2010 TR_{3}	—	October 2, 2010	Kitt Peak	Spacewatch	·	880 m	MPC · JPL
548604	2010 TH_{5}	—	October 1, 2010	Socorro	LINEAR	·	1.8 km	MPC · JPL
548605	2010 TR_{11}	—	October 2, 2010	Nogales	M. Schwartz, P. R. Holvorcem	EOS	1.9 km	MPC · JPL
548606	2010 TK_{14}	—	October 3, 2010	Kitt Peak	Spacewatch	·	1.2 km	MPC · JPL
548607	2010 TQ_{15}	—	October 3, 2010	Kitt Peak	Spacewatch	·	1.6 km	MPC · JPL
548608	2010 TO_{25}	—	October 1, 2010	La Sagra	OAM	EUN	1.3 km	MPC · JPL
548609	2010 TC_{28}	—	September 9, 2010	Kitt Peak	Spacewatch	·	1.5 km	MPC · JPL
548610	2010 TK_{40}	—	December 17, 2007	Kitt Peak	Spacewatch	·	1.4 km	MPC · JPL
548611	2010 TF_{41}	—	April 6, 2008	Mount Lemmon	Mount Lemmon Survey	·	1.4 km	MPC · JPL
548612	2010 TF_{44}	—	October 3, 2010	Kitt Peak	Spacewatch	·	1.2 km	MPC · JPL
548613	2010 TK_{46}	—	October 4, 2006	Mount Lemmon	Mount Lemmon Survey	·	1.3 km	MPC · JPL
548614	2010 TH_{47}	—	October 7, 2010	Socorro	LINEAR	·	1.8 km	MPC · JPL
548615	2010 TS_{47}	—	October 8, 2010	Kitt Peak	Spacewatch	·	2.8 km	MPC · JPL
548616	2010 TK_{48}	—	September 10, 2010	Kitt Peak	Spacewatch	·	410 m	MPC · JPL
548617	2010 TD_{56}	—	September 21, 2001	Kitt Peak	Spacewatch	·	1.3 km	MPC · JPL
548618	2010 TL_{58}	—	October 6, 2010	Marly	P. Kocher	·	1.7 km	MPC · JPL
548619	2010 TV_{60}	—	October 7, 2010	Kitt Peak	Spacewatch	·	1.4 km	MPC · JPL
548620	2010 TF_{64}	—	September 15, 2010	Kitt Peak	Spacewatch	·	1.7 km	MPC · JPL
548621	2010 TF_{72}	—	February 18, 2008	Mount Lemmon	Mount Lemmon Survey	·	1.4 km	MPC · JPL
548622	2010 TG_{73}	—	October 8, 2010	Kitt Peak	Spacewatch	·	1.0 km	MPC · JPL
548623	2010 TE_{77}	—	October 8, 2010	Charleston	R. Holmes	·	580 m	MPC · JPL
548624 Ekwerike	2010 TL_{78}	Ekwerike	September 15, 2010	Charleston	R. Holmes	·	1.8 km	MPC · JPL
548625	2010 TW_{83}	—	September 15, 2010	Kitt Peak	Spacewatch	·	450 m	MPC · JPL
548626	2010 TP_{90}	—	March 10, 2008	Kitt Peak	Spacewatch	EUN	900 m	MPC · JPL
548627	2010 TB_{98}	—	February 10, 2008	Kitt Peak	Spacewatch	·	1.3 km	MPC · JPL
548628	2010 TX_{100}	—	November 1, 2005	Kitt Peak	Spacewatch	·	1.2 km	MPC · JPL
548629	2010 TG_{110}	—	October 9, 2010	Mount Lemmon	Mount Lemmon Survey	·	1.2 km	MPC · JPL
548630	2010 TV_{110}	—	October 12, 2006	Palomar	NEAT	·	1.1 km	MPC · JPL
548631	2010 TS_{115}	—	October 9, 2010	Kitt Peak	Spacewatch	·	1.5 km	MPC · JPL
548632	2010 TX_{120}	—	February 10, 2008	Mount Lemmon	Mount Lemmon Survey	HNS	900 m	MPC · JPL
548633	2010 TR_{133}	—	November 17, 2006	Vail-Jarnac	Jarnac	·	1.2 km	MPC · JPL
548634	2010 TU_{139}	—	October 11, 2010	Mount Lemmon	Mount Lemmon Survey	·	1.8 km	MPC · JPL
548635	2010 TR_{141}	—	August 20, 2001	Cerro Tololo	Deep Ecliptic Survey	·	1.2 km	MPC · JPL
548636	2010 TZ_{146}	—	April 3, 2008	Mount Lemmon	Mount Lemmon Survey	·	1.7 km	MPC · JPL
548637	2010 TR_{155}	—	September 16, 2010	Kitt Peak	Spacewatch	·	1.4 km	MPC · JPL
548638	2010 TT_{156}	—	October 10, 2010	Kitt Peak	Spacewatch	·	1.4 km	MPC · JPL
548639	2010 TO_{160}	—	September 11, 2010	Kitt Peak	Spacewatch	·	1.3 km	MPC · JPL
548640	2010 TP_{160}	—	January 16, 2008	Kitt Peak	Spacewatch	·	1.1 km	MPC · JPL
548641	2010 TN_{162}	—	April 30, 2009	Mount Lemmon	Mount Lemmon Survey	·	2.3 km	MPC · JPL
548642	2010 TD_{165}	—	October 13, 2010	Mount Lemmon	Mount Lemmon Survey	·	1.0 km	MPC · JPL
548643	2010 TD_{169}	—	September 1, 2010	Mount Lemmon	Mount Lemmon Survey	·	1.2 km	MPC · JPL
548644	2010 TH_{178}	—	October 10, 2004	Kitt Peak	Spacewatch	·	3.5 km	MPC · JPL
548645	2010 TR_{178}	—	October 1, 2010	Kitt Peak	Spacewatch	·	490 m	MPC · JPL
548646	2010 TX_{180}	—	October 16, 1993	Kitt Peak	Spacewatch	·	1.2 km	MPC · JPL
548647	2010 TF_{186}	—	October 14, 2010	Mount Lemmon	Mount Lemmon Survey	·	1.5 km	MPC · JPL
548648	2010 TT_{187}	—	October 2, 2006	Mount Lemmon	Mount Lemmon Survey	·	1.6 km	MPC · JPL
548649	2010 TF_{193}	—	August 9, 2005	Cerro Tololo	Deep Ecliptic Survey	·	1.5 km	MPC · JPL
548650	2010 TA_{194}	—	September 18, 2001	Kitt Peak	Spacewatch	·	1.5 km	MPC · JPL
548651	2010 TB_{194}	—	December 26, 2006	Kitt Peak	Spacewatch	·	1.3 km	MPC · JPL
548652	2010 TG_{194}	—	October 2, 2010	Mount Lemmon	Mount Lemmon Survey	·	2.0 km	MPC · JPL
548653	2010 TL_{194}	—	October 9, 2010	Mount Lemmon	Mount Lemmon Survey	·	1.4 km	MPC · JPL
548654	2010 TF_{195}	—	October 2, 2010	Kitt Peak	Spacewatch	·	1.1 km	MPC · JPL
548655	2010 TJ_{196}	—	October 1, 2010	Mount Lemmon	Mount Lemmon Survey	·	1.0 km	MPC · JPL
548656	2010 TU_{196}	—	March 24, 2014	Haleakala	Pan-STARRS 1	SYL	4.0 km	MPC · JPL
548657	2010 TO_{199}	—	July 25, 2015	Haleakala	Pan-STARRS 1	·	1.4 km	MPC · JPL
548658	2010 TX_{201}	—	October 2, 2010	Mount Lemmon	Mount Lemmon Survey	GAL	1.5 km	MPC · JPL
548659	2010 TC_{202}	—	October 12, 2010	Kitt Peak	Spacewatch	HNS	1.0 km	MPC · JPL
548660	2010 TD_{203}	—	October 13, 2010	Mount Lemmon	Mount Lemmon Survey	·	1.5 km	MPC · JPL
548661	2010 TF_{203}	—	February 23, 2012	Mount Lemmon	Mount Lemmon Survey	·	1.5 km	MPC · JPL
548662	2010 TK_{203}	—	October 12, 2010	Mount Lemmon	Mount Lemmon Survey	HNS	930 m	MPC · JPL
548663	2010 TR_{203}	—	October 8, 2010	Kitt Peak	Spacewatch	·	1.1 km	MPC · JPL
548664	2010 TT_{203}	—	October 2, 2010	Mount Lemmon	Mount Lemmon Survey	·	1.4 km	MPC · JPL
548665	2010 TA_{204}	—	September 26, 2017	Haleakala	Pan-STARRS 1	·	590 m	MPC · JPL
548666	2010 TP_{204}	—	October 14, 2010	Mount Lemmon	Mount Lemmon Survey	·	1.2 km	MPC · JPL
548667	2010 TR_{204}	—	October 11, 2010	Kitt Peak	Spacewatch	·	1.3 km	MPC · JPL
548668	2010 TB_{205}	—	August 12, 2013	Haleakala	Pan-STARRS 1	V	450 m	MPC · JPL
548669	2010 TP_{208}	—	October 13, 2010	Mount Lemmon	Mount Lemmon Survey	·	1.3 km	MPC · JPL
548670	2010 TU_{209}	—	October 13, 2010	Mount Lemmon	Mount Lemmon Survey	WIT	700 m	MPC · JPL
548671	2010 TW_{209}	—	February 14, 2012	Haleakala	Pan-STARRS 1	·	1.2 km	MPC · JPL
548672	2010 TH_{210}	—	October 9, 2010	Mount Lemmon	Mount Lemmon Survey	·	1.2 km	MPC · JPL
548673	2010 TJ_{211}	—	October 1, 2010	Mount Lemmon	Mount Lemmon Survey	·	840 m	MPC · JPL
548674	2010 TJ_{214}	—	October 1, 2010	Mount Lemmon	Mount Lemmon Survey	·	1.6 km	MPC · JPL
548675	2010 TN_{214}	—	October 1, 2010	Mount Lemmon	Mount Lemmon Survey	·	2.0 km	MPC · JPL
548676	2010 TP_{214}	—	October 12, 2010	Mount Lemmon	Mount Lemmon Survey	·	400 m	MPC · JPL
548677	2010 UZ_{2}	—	October 17, 2010	Mount Lemmon	Mount Lemmon Survey	EUN	1.0 km	MPC · JPL
548678	2010 UB_{4}	—	October 17, 2010	Mount Lemmon	Mount Lemmon Survey	GEF	1.0 km	MPC · JPL
548679	2010 UH_{4}	—	September 17, 2003	Kitt Peak	Spacewatch	·	480 m	MPC · JPL
548680	2010 UW_{4}	—	September 17, 2010	Mount Lemmon	Mount Lemmon Survey	·	1.8 km	MPC · JPL
548681	2010 UT_{6}	—	October 16, 2010	Mayhill-ISON	L. Elenin	·	2.1 km	MPC · JPL
548682	2010 UQ_{10}	—	December 20, 2006	Ottmarsheim	C. Rinner	(5)	1.5 km	MPC · JPL
548683	2010 UE_{18}	—	October 28, 2010	Mount Lemmon	Mount Lemmon Survey	MAR	930 m	MPC · JPL
548684	2010 UT_{19}	—	January 29, 2003	Apache Point	SDSS Collaboration	·	1.0 km	MPC · JPL
548685	2010 UQ_{22}	—	September 17, 2010	Mount Lemmon	Mount Lemmon Survey	·	1.3 km	MPC · JPL
548686	2010 UC_{23}	—	October 17, 2010	Mount Lemmon	Mount Lemmon Survey	·	1.5 km	MPC · JPL
548687	2010 UU_{24}	—	December 13, 2006	Kitt Peak	Spacewatch	·	1.2 km	MPC · JPL
548688	2010 UU_{25}	—	September 20, 2003	Anderson Mesa	LONEOS	·	540 m	MPC · JPL
548689	2010 UG_{29}	—	October 17, 2010	Catalina	CSS	EUN	1.1 km	MPC · JPL
548690 Hazucha	2010 UC_{30}	Hazucha	October 28, 2010	Piszkéstető	S. Kürti, K. Sárneczky	·	1.3 km	MPC · JPL
548691	2010 UX_{32}	—	October 29, 2010	Mount Lemmon	Mount Lemmon Survey	·	1.5 km	MPC · JPL
548692	2010 UM_{33}	—	October 15, 2001	Kitt Peak	Spacewatch	·	1.6 km	MPC · JPL
548693	2010 UK_{34}	—	October 29, 2010	Mount Lemmon	Mount Lemmon Survey	·	1.4 km	MPC · JPL
548694	2010 UZ_{37}	—	October 14, 2010	Mount Lemmon	Mount Lemmon Survey	·	1.3 km	MPC · JPL
548695	2010 UW_{41}	—	October 18, 2001	Palomar	NEAT	·	2.2 km	MPC · JPL
548696	2010 UZ_{43}	—	October 30, 2010	Mount Lemmon	Mount Lemmon Survey	EUN	960 m	MPC · JPL
548697	2010 UE_{45}	—	October 13, 2010	Mount Lemmon	Mount Lemmon Survey	WIT	760 m	MPC · JPL
548698	2010 UE_{48}	—	October 31, 2010	ESA OGS	ESA OGS	·	1.7 km	MPC · JPL
548699	2010 UZ_{53}	—	October 17, 2010	Mount Lemmon	Mount Lemmon Survey	·	610 m	MPC · JPL
548700	2010 UN_{55}	—	October 29, 2010	Kitt Peak	Spacewatch	T_{j} (2.97) · 3:2	4.4 km	MPC · JPL

== 548701–548800 ==
back to top

Designation			Discovery			Properties		Ref
Permanent	Provisional	Named after	Date	Site	Discoverer(s)	Category	Diam.	Ref
548701	2010 UO_{60}	—	November 20, 2006	Kitt Peak	Spacewatch	·	1.4 km	MPC · JPL
548702	2010 UK_{63}	—	October 30, 2010	Mount Lemmon	Mount Lemmon Survey	·	1.8 km	MPC · JPL
548703	2010 UO_{64}	—	October 31, 2010	Piszkés-tető	K. Sárneczky, Z. Kuli	·	1.5 km	MPC · JPL
548704	2010 UB_{65}	—	October 31, 2010	Kitt Peak	Spacewatch	·	1.6 km	MPC · JPL
548705	2010 UQ_{67}	—	October 4, 2006	Mount Lemmon	Mount Lemmon Survey	·	1.6 km	MPC · JPL
548706	2010 UR_{69}	—	October 13, 2001	Palomar	NEAT	·	1.7 km	MPC · JPL
548707	2010 UF_{73}	—	October 29, 2010	Catalina	CSS	JUN	1.1 km	MPC · JPL
548708	2010 UD_{79}	—	October 30, 2010	Mount Lemmon	Mount Lemmon Survey	·	1.2 km	MPC · JPL
548709	2010 US_{86}	—	October 12, 2010	Mount Lemmon	Mount Lemmon Survey	·	810 m	MPC · JPL
548710	2010 UF_{88}	—	September 28, 2003	Kitt Peak	Spacewatch	·	530 m	MPC · JPL
548711	2010 UP_{92}	—	October 2, 2005	Siding Spring	SSS	·	1.6 km	MPC · JPL
548712	2010 UK_{96}	—	July 11, 2005	Kitt Peak	Spacewatch	·	1.9 km	MPC · JPL
548713	2010 UB_{100}	—	October 3, 2006	Mount Lemmon	Mount Lemmon Survey	·	660 m	MPC · JPL
548714	2010 UT_{105}	—	November 11, 2010	Mount Lemmon	Mount Lemmon Survey	·	1.3 km	MPC · JPL
548715 Stus	2010 UC_{106}	Stus	October 31, 2010	Andrushivka	Y. Ivaščenko	·	1.7 km	MPC · JPL
548716	2010 UJ_{110}	—	October 17, 2010	Mount Lemmon	Mount Lemmon Survey	·	1.1 km	MPC · JPL
548717	2010 UJ_{111}	—	September 17, 2010	Catalina	CSS	JUN	1.3 km	MPC · JPL
548718	2010 UP_{111}	—	October 17, 2010	Mount Lemmon	Mount Lemmon Survey	ULA	3.7 km	MPC · JPL
548719	2010 UF_{113}	—	October 29, 2010	Mount Lemmon	Mount Lemmon Survey	·	1.4 km	MPC · JPL
548720	2010 UL_{113}	—	October 17, 2010	Mount Lemmon	Mount Lemmon Survey	·	1.0 km	MPC · JPL
548721	2010 UM_{115}	—	October 17, 2010	Mount Lemmon	Mount Lemmon Survey	·	1.4 km	MPC · JPL
548722	2010 UQ_{115}	—	October 28, 2010	Mount Lemmon	Mount Lemmon Survey	·	1.4 km	MPC · JPL
548723	2010 UF_{116}	—	October 17, 2010	Mount Lemmon	Mount Lemmon Survey	·	1.6 km	MPC · JPL
548724	2010 UL_{119}	—	September 4, 2014	Haleakala	Pan-STARRS 1	·	1.3 km	MPC · JPL
548725	2010 UK_{121}	—	October 31, 2010	Mount Lemmon	Mount Lemmon Survey	·	1.2 km	MPC · JPL
548726	2010 UD_{122}	—	October 31, 2010	Kitt Peak	Spacewatch	·	1.5 km	MPC · JPL
548727	2010 UV_{125}	—	October 17, 2010	Mount Lemmon	Mount Lemmon Survey	·	520 m	MPC · JPL
548728	2010 VU_{4}	—	November 1, 2010	Mount Lemmon	Mount Lemmon Survey	·	1.2 km	MPC · JPL
548729	2010 VM_{9}	—	November 1, 2010	Mount Lemmon	Mount Lemmon Survey	·	1.5 km	MPC · JPL
548730	2010 VS_{18}	—	October 12, 2010	Mount Lemmon	Mount Lemmon Survey	NEM	2.0 km	MPC · JPL
548731	2010 VH_{23}	—	February 28, 2008	Kitt Peak	Spacewatch	·	1.3 km	MPC · JPL
548732	2010 VP_{25}	—	October 26, 2001	Palomar	NEAT	·	1.7 km	MPC · JPL
548733	2010 VL_{28}	—	October 3, 2010	Catalina	CSS	·	1.7 km	MPC · JPL
548734	2010 VA_{35}	—	February 10, 1999	Kitt Peak	Spacewatch	·	1.5 km	MPC · JPL
548735	2010 VU_{38}	—	January 21, 2007	Altschwendt	W. Ries	·	1.7 km	MPC · JPL
548736	2010 VV_{39}	—	September 11, 2010	Mount Lemmon	Mount Lemmon Survey	·	1.7 km	MPC · JPL
548737	2010 VF_{40}	—	December 5, 2007	Mount Lemmon	Mount Lemmon Survey	·	4.2 km	MPC · JPL
548738	2010 VM_{43}	—	September 18, 2010	Mount Lemmon	Mount Lemmon Survey	·	1.3 km	MPC · JPL
548739	2010 VG_{45}	—	August 6, 2005	Palomar	NEAT	·	1.6 km	MPC · JPL
548740	2010 VL_{46}	—	November 2, 2010	Kitt Peak	Spacewatch	EMA	2.9 km	MPC · JPL
548741	2010 VG_{51}	—	November 3, 2010	Kitt Peak	Spacewatch	·	2.0 km	MPC · JPL
548742	2010 VA_{54}	—	November 3, 2010	Mount Lemmon	Mount Lemmon Survey	(11882)	1.2 km	MPC · JPL
548743	2010 VS_{54}	—	November 3, 2010	Mount Lemmon	Mount Lemmon Survey	·	1.6 km	MPC · JPL
548744	2010 VA_{64}	—	April 27, 2008	Mount Lemmon	Mount Lemmon Survey	·	2.1 km	MPC · JPL
548745	2010 VK_{67}	—	November 2, 2010	Mount Lemmon	Mount Lemmon Survey	·	1.5 km	MPC · JPL
548746	2010 VL_{67}	—	November 2, 2010	Mount Lemmon	Mount Lemmon Survey	·	1.5 km	MPC · JPL
548747	2010 VN_{73}	—	November 2, 2010	Mount Lemmon	Mount Lemmon Survey	·	1.6 km	MPC · JPL
548748	2010 VH_{74}	—	October 11, 2005	Kitt Peak	Spacewatch	·	2.2 km	MPC · JPL
548749	2010 VP_{76}	—	November 1, 2010	Mount Lemmon	Mount Lemmon Survey	·	1.4 km	MPC · JPL
548750	2010 VB_{79}	—	February 6, 2007	Palomar	NEAT	·	740 m	MPC · JPL
548751	2010 VO_{83}	—	November 5, 2010	Kitt Peak	Spacewatch	GEF	980 m	MPC · JPL
548752	2010 VY_{83}	—	November 5, 2010	Kitt Peak	Spacewatch	·	1.5 km	MPC · JPL
548753	2010 VY_{84}	—	November 23, 2006	Kitt Peak	Spacewatch	·	1.1 km	MPC · JPL
548754	2010 VS_{90}	—	August 31, 2005	Kitt Peak	Spacewatch	·	1.7 km	MPC · JPL
548755	2010 VW_{90}	—	November 6, 2010	Kitt Peak	Spacewatch	·	2.2 km	MPC · JPL
548756	2010 VV_{91}	—	November 6, 2010	Kitt Peak	Spacewatch	·	2.1 km	MPC · JPL
548757	2010 VB_{92}	—	November 4, 2010	Pla D'Arguines	R. Ferrando, Ferrando, M.	·	1.1 km	MPC · JPL
548758	2010 VH_{92}	—	September 12, 2001	Kitt Peak	Deep Ecliptic Survey	·	1.4 km	MPC · JPL
548759	2010 VN_{92}	—	October 14, 2010	Mount Lemmon	Mount Lemmon Survey	·	1.4 km	MPC · JPL
548760	2010 VT_{97}	—	August 29, 2005	Kitt Peak	Spacewatch	·	1.4 km	MPC · JPL
548761	2010 VN_{100}	—	December 21, 2006	Kitt Peak	Spacewatch	·	1.3 km	MPC · JPL
548762	2010 VY_{101}	—	November 5, 2010	Kitt Peak	Spacewatch	·	2.0 km	MPC · JPL
548763	2010 VQ_{103}	—	November 5, 2010	Kitt Peak	Spacewatch	ADE	1.8 km	MPC · JPL
548764	2010 VX_{105}	—	November 5, 2010	Mount Lemmon	Mount Lemmon Survey	·	450 m	MPC · JPL
548765	2010 VQ_{107}	—	August 30, 2005	Kitt Peak	Spacewatch	·	1.4 km	MPC · JPL
548766	2010 VM_{109}	—	November 6, 2010	Mount Lemmon	Mount Lemmon Survey	·	1.3 km	MPC · JPL
548767	2010 VW_{109}	—	October 25, 2001	Apache Point	SDSS Collaboration	·	1.6 km	MPC · JPL
548768	2010 VD_{110}	—	November 6, 2010	Mount Lemmon	Mount Lemmon Survey	·	1.3 km	MPC · JPL
548769	2010 VJ_{110}	—	March 15, 2008	Kitt Peak	Spacewatch	·	1.4 km	MPC · JPL
548770	2010 VX_{112}	—	November 7, 2010	Kitt Peak	Spacewatch	·	1.6 km	MPC · JPL
548771	2010 VC_{114}	—	September 1, 2005	Kitt Peak	Spacewatch	·	1.6 km	MPC · JPL
548772	2010 VL_{115}	—	November 7, 2010	Mount Lemmon	Mount Lemmon Survey	AGN	1.1 km	MPC · JPL
548773	2010 VD_{116}	—	October 18, 2003	Anderson Mesa	LONEOS	·	530 m	MPC · JPL
548774	2010 VL_{116}	—	November 8, 2010	Kitt Peak	Spacewatch	·	1.2 km	MPC · JPL
548775	2010 VB_{118}	—	September 5, 2010	Mount Lemmon	Mount Lemmon Survey	(5)	1.3 km	MPC · JPL
548776	2010 VM_{119}	—	August 18, 2009	Kitt Peak	Spacewatch	3:2	4.5 km	MPC · JPL
548777	2010 VV_{119}	—	November 8, 2010	Kitt Peak	Spacewatch	·	1.5 km	MPC · JPL
548778	2010 VY_{119}	—	November 19, 2003	Kitt Peak	Spacewatch	·	570 m	MPC · JPL
548779	2010 VR_{122}	—	November 8, 2010	Mount Lemmon	Mount Lemmon Survey	·	1.6 km	MPC · JPL
548780	2010 VT_{123}	—	October 29, 2010	Mount Lemmon	Mount Lemmon Survey	·	1.6 km	MPC · JPL
548781	2010 VN_{136}	—	November 10, 2010	Mount Lemmon	Mount Lemmon Survey	·	1.8 km	MPC · JPL
548782	2010 VE_{137}	—	November 1, 2010	Kitt Peak	Spacewatch	·	1.5 km	MPC · JPL
548783	2010 VX_{138}	—	October 28, 2010	Mount Lemmon	Mount Lemmon Survey	·	1.8 km	MPC · JPL
548784	2010 VD_{141}	—	March 10, 2008	Mount Lemmon	Mount Lemmon Survey	·	1.5 km	MPC · JPL
548785	2010 VN_{141}	—	November 6, 2010	Mount Lemmon	Mount Lemmon Survey	·	1.3 km	MPC · JPL
548786	2010 VZ_{146}	—	November 6, 2010	Mount Lemmon	Mount Lemmon Survey	·	1.3 km	MPC · JPL
548787	2010 VC_{149}	—	August 24, 2001	Haleakala	NEAT	(5)	1.4 km	MPC · JPL
548788	2010 VJ_{149}	—	September 26, 2005	Kitt Peak	Spacewatch	·	1.9 km	MPC · JPL
548789	2010 VC_{150}	—	August 26, 2005	Palomar	NEAT	·	1.7 km	MPC · JPL
548790	2010 VL_{151}	—	November 6, 2010	Mount Lemmon	Mount Lemmon Survey	EUN	1.2 km	MPC · JPL
548791	2010 VU_{154}	—	November 7, 2010	Mount Lemmon	Mount Lemmon Survey	·	540 m	MPC · JPL
548792	2010 VJ_{156}	—	November 7, 2010	Mount Lemmon	Mount Lemmon Survey	·	1.2 km	MPC · JPL
548793	2010 VQ_{159}	—	November 8, 2010	Mount Lemmon	Mount Lemmon Survey	ADE	2.2 km	MPC · JPL
548794	2010 VD_{160}	—	November 8, 2010	Mount Lemmon	Mount Lemmon Survey	·	1.9 km	MPC · JPL
548795	2010 VT_{168}	—	November 10, 2010	Mount Lemmon	Mount Lemmon Survey	GEF	980 m	MPC · JPL
548796	2010 VV_{168}	—	November 10, 2010	Mount Lemmon	Mount Lemmon Survey	·	1.4 km	MPC · JPL
548797	2010 VQ_{171}	—	November 10, 2010	Mount Lemmon	Mount Lemmon Survey	·	1.5 km	MPC · JPL
548798	2010 VB_{174}	—	November 11, 2010	La Sagra	OAM	·	1.9 km	MPC · JPL
548799	2010 VR_{183}	—	February 11, 2008	Kitt Peak	Spacewatch	·	1.8 km	MPC · JPL
548800	2010 VZ_{183}	—	November 12, 2010	Mount Lemmon	Mount Lemmon Survey	·	1.7 km	MPC · JPL

== 548801–548900 ==
back to top

Designation			Discovery			Properties		Ref
Permanent	Provisional	Named after	Date	Site	Discoverer(s)	Category	Diam.	Ref
548801	2010 VG_{193}	—	October 30, 2010	Kitt Peak	Spacewatch	·	1.7 km	MPC · JPL
548802	2010 VP_{195}	—	October 29, 2010	Kitt Peak	Spacewatch	·	1.9 km	MPC · JPL
548803	2010 VC_{199}	—	November 13, 2010	Mount Lemmon	Mount Lemmon Survey	·	900 m	MPC · JPL
548804	2010 VX_{199}	—	November 6, 2010	Catalina	CSS	·	1.6 km	MPC · JPL
548805	2010 VZ_{199}	—	October 30, 2010	Catalina	CSS	JUN	1 km	MPC · JPL
548806	2010 VN_{201}	—	November 6, 2010	La Sagra	OAM	·	2.0 km	MPC · JPL
548807	2010 VL_{203}	—	March 8, 2008	Kitt Peak	Spacewatch	·	1.9 km	MPC · JPL
548808	2010 VQ_{203}	—	October 17, 2010	Mount Lemmon	Mount Lemmon Survey	·	1.3 km	MPC · JPL
548809	2010 VW_{203}	—	February 27, 2012	Kitt Peak	Spacewatch	ADE	2.0 km	MPC · JPL
548810	2010 VG_{205}	—	September 30, 2003	Kitt Peak	Spacewatch	·	440 m	MPC · JPL
548811	2010 VU_{208}	—	November 10, 2010	Mount Lemmon	Mount Lemmon Survey	·	1.9 km	MPC · JPL
548812	2010 VH_{211}	—	October 17, 2001	Palomar	NEAT	·	2.1 km	MPC · JPL
548813	2010 VE_{212}	—	December 9, 2010	Front Royal	Skillman, D. R.	EUN	1.2 km	MPC · JPL
548814	2010 VS_{212}	—	July 30, 2005	Palomar	NEAT	·	2.0 km	MPC · JPL
548815	2010 VQ_{213}	—	November 8, 2010	Mount Lemmon	Mount Lemmon Survey	·	1.4 km	MPC · JPL
548816	2010 VQ_{218}	—	December 1, 2005	Kitt Peak	Spacewatch	THM	1.6 km	MPC · JPL
548817	2010 VE_{219}	—	July 12, 2005	Kitt Peak	Spacewatch	·	1.7 km	MPC · JPL
548818	2010 VQ_{223}	—	November 13, 2010	Mount Lemmon	Mount Lemmon Survey	·	1.2 km	MPC · JPL
548819	2010 VP_{225}	—	January 25, 2014	Haleakala	Pan-STARRS 1	L4	7.5 km	MPC · JPL
548820	2010 VW_{226}	—	November 2, 2010	Mount Lemmon	Mount Lemmon Survey	·	1.4 km	MPC · JPL
548821	2010 VG_{229}	—	November 3, 2010	Mount Lemmon	Mount Lemmon Survey	·	1.3 km	MPC · JPL
548822	2010 VG_{231}	—	May 8, 2013	Haleakala	Pan-STARRS 1	·	890 m	MPC · JPL
548823	2010 VM_{231}	—	November 13, 2010	Mount Lemmon	Mount Lemmon Survey	(194)	1.3 km	MPC · JPL
548824	2010 VA_{233}	—	November 8, 2010	Kitt Peak	Spacewatch	·	1.9 km	MPC · JPL
548825	2010 VB_{233}	—	September 19, 2014	Haleakala	Pan-STARRS 1	EUN	810 m	MPC · JPL
548826	2010 VU_{234}	—	November 20, 2001	Socorro	LINEAR	·	1.4 km	MPC · JPL
548827	2010 VJ_{240}	—	November 12, 2010	Mount Lemmon	Mount Lemmon Survey	·	1.3 km	MPC · JPL
548828	2010 VT_{240}	—	November 5, 2010	Kitt Peak	Spacewatch	·	1.7 km	MPC · JPL
548829	2010 VR_{242}	—	April 30, 2014	Haleakala	Pan-STARRS 1	·	1.3 km	MPC · JPL
548830	2010 VN_{245}	—	October 12, 2010	Mount Lemmon	Mount Lemmon Survey	·	1.8 km	MPC · JPL
548831	2010 VW_{245}	—	November 12, 2010	Mount Lemmon	Mount Lemmon Survey	L4	8.2 km	MPC · JPL
548832	2010 VD_{246}	—	January 1, 2012	Mount Lemmon	Mount Lemmon Survey	·	1.6 km	MPC · JPL
548833	2010 VJ_{247}	—	January 21, 2012	Kitt Peak	Spacewatch	·	1.5 km	MPC · JPL
548834	2010 VM_{249}	—	November 2, 2010	Mount Lemmon	Mount Lemmon Survey	·	540 m	MPC · JPL
548835	2010 VX_{251}	—	November 13, 2010	Mount Lemmon	Mount Lemmon Survey	V	420 m	MPC · JPL
548836	2010 VN_{252}	—	November 11, 2010	Mount Lemmon	Mount Lemmon Survey	·	1.5 km	MPC · JPL
548837	2010 VP_{252}	—	November 10, 2010	Kitt Peak	Spacewatch	·	1.5 km	MPC · JPL
548838	2010 VO_{253}	—	November 1, 2010	Mount Lemmon	Mount Lemmon Survey	EUP	4.3 km	MPC · JPL
548839	2010 VG_{258}	—	November 13, 2010	Mount Lemmon	Mount Lemmon Survey	BRA	1.2 km	MPC · JPL
548840	2010 VZ_{259}	—	November 8, 2010	XuYi	PMO NEO Survey Program	·	1.8 km	MPC · JPL
548841	2010 VL_{260}	—	November 15, 2010	Mount Lemmon	Mount Lemmon Survey	EOS	1.5 km	MPC · JPL
548842	2010 VR_{261}	—	November 1, 2010	Mount Lemmon	Mount Lemmon Survey	·	1.6 km	MPC · JPL
548843	2010 WS_{1}	—	October 28, 2010	Mount Lemmon	Mount Lemmon Survey	·	1.5 km	MPC · JPL
548844	2010 WR_{2}	—	November 1, 2010	Kitt Peak	Spacewatch	·	1.5 km	MPC · JPL
548845	2010 WL_{10}	—	December 2, 2005	Kitt Peak	Spacewatch	·	1.2 km	MPC · JPL
548846	2010 WV_{10}	—	November 16, 2010	Mount Lemmon	Mount Lemmon Survey	·	1.7 km	MPC · JPL
548847	2010 WR_{13}	—	November 10, 2010	Mount Lemmon	Mount Lemmon Survey	·	1.6 km	MPC · JPL
548848	2010 WB_{15}	—	September 5, 2010	Mount Lemmon	Mount Lemmon Survey	·	1.4 km	MPC · JPL
548849	2010 WX_{16}	—	November 27, 2010	Mount Lemmon	Mount Lemmon Survey	·	1.6 km	MPC · JPL
548850	2010 WN_{18}	—	April 14, 2008	Mount Lemmon	Mount Lemmon Survey	AGN	1.1 km	MPC · JPL
548851	2010 WB_{21}	—	November 27, 2010	Mount Lemmon	Mount Lemmon Survey	·	1.4 km	MPC · JPL
548852	2010 WH_{23}	—	November 27, 2010	Mount Lemmon	Mount Lemmon Survey	·	600 m	MPC · JPL
548853	2010 WA_{25}	—	November 10, 2010	Mount Lemmon	Mount Lemmon Survey	·	1.3 km	MPC · JPL
548854	2010 WO_{28}	—	November 27, 2010	Mount Lemmon	Mount Lemmon Survey	·	1.3 km	MPC · JPL
548855	2010 WX_{28}	—	September 4, 2010	Kitt Peak	Spacewatch	·	2.1 km	MPC · JPL
548856	2010 WN_{29}	—	November 20, 2001	Kitt Peak	Spacewatch	·	1.9 km	MPC · JPL
548857	2010 WF_{31}	—	November 27, 2010	Mount Lemmon	Mount Lemmon Survey	·	1.4 km	MPC · JPL
548858	2010 WF_{38}	—	November 27, 2010	Mount Lemmon	Mount Lemmon Survey	·	1.4 km	MPC · JPL
548859	2010 WT_{38}	—	November 27, 2010	Mount Lemmon	Mount Lemmon Survey	·	590 m	MPC · JPL
548860	2010 WW_{38}	—	November 12, 2010	Kitt Peak	Spacewatch	·	790 m	MPC · JPL
548861	2010 WG_{42}	—	October 1, 2005	Mount Lemmon	Mount Lemmon Survey	MRX	880 m	MPC · JPL
548862	2010 WG_{44}	—	October 13, 2010	Mount Lemmon	Mount Lemmon Survey	·	1.4 km	MPC · JPL
548863	2010 WK_{46}	—	December 19, 2004	Mount Lemmon	Mount Lemmon Survey	·	1.0 km	MPC · JPL
548864	2010 WQ_{46}	—	February 2, 2005	Kitt Peak	Spacewatch	·	630 m	MPC · JPL
548865	2010 WX_{46}	—	November 27, 2010	Mount Lemmon	Mount Lemmon Survey	·	1.3 km	MPC · JPL
548866	2010 WZ_{50}	—	November 27, 2010	Mount Lemmon	Mount Lemmon Survey	·	1.4 km	MPC · JPL
548867	2010 WB_{55}	—	October 29, 2010	Mount Lemmon	Mount Lemmon Survey	·	2.0 km	MPC · JPL
548868	2010 WH_{58}	—	November 8, 2010	Kitt Peak	Spacewatch	·	1.6 km	MPC · JPL
548869	2010 WA_{59}	—	November 30, 2010	Mount Lemmon	Mount Lemmon Survey	PAD	1.4 km	MPC · JPL
548870	2010 WA_{60}	—	November 11, 2010	Mount Lemmon	Mount Lemmon Survey	·	1.7 km	MPC · JPL
548871	2010 WO_{60}	—	October 14, 2010	Mount Lemmon	Mount Lemmon Survey	EUN	1.4 km	MPC · JPL
548872	2010 WY_{62}	—	November 8, 2010	Kitt Peak	Spacewatch	·	2.2 km	MPC · JPL
548873	2010 WM_{65}	—	November 28, 2010	Mount Lemmon	Mount Lemmon Survey	·	1.7 km	MPC · JPL
548874	2010 WY_{66}	—	November 10, 2010	Mount Lemmon	Mount Lemmon Survey	·	1.7 km	MPC · JPL
548875	2010 WW_{75}	—	June 12, 2013	Haleakala	Pan-STARRS 1	·	1.2 km	MPC · JPL
548876	2010 WX_{75}	—	November 30, 2010	Mount Lemmon	Mount Lemmon Survey	V	570 m	MPC · JPL
548877	2010 WZ_{75}	—	November 27, 2010	Mount Lemmon	Mount Lemmon Survey	·	580 m	MPC · JPL
548878	2010 WH_{76}	—	January 10, 2007	Kitt Peak	Spacewatch	·	1.4 km	MPC · JPL
548879	2010 WR_{77}	—	December 18, 2015	Kitt Peak	Spacewatch	·	1.5 km	MPC · JPL
548880	2010 XJ_{1}	—	November 6, 2010	Mount Lemmon	Mount Lemmon Survey	·	1.5 km	MPC · JPL
548881	2010 XJ_{2}	—	December 1, 2010	Mount Lemmon	Mount Lemmon Survey	·	1.4 km	MPC · JPL
548882	2010 XV_{2}	—	December 1, 2010	Kitt Peak	Spacewatch	·	1.5 km	MPC · JPL
548883	2010 XE_{5}	—	December 2, 2010	Mount Lemmon	Mount Lemmon Survey	·	1.8 km	MPC · JPL
548884	2010 XD_{10}	—	August 30, 2005	Kitt Peak	Spacewatch	·	1.3 km	MPC · JPL
548885	2010 XP_{11}	—	December 1, 2010	Mount Lemmon	Mount Lemmon Survey	·	1.7 km	MPC · JPL
548886	2010 XQ_{12}	—	November 3, 2010	La Sagra	OAM	·	1.7 km	MPC · JPL
548887	2010 XH_{15}	—	October 10, 2005	Kitt Peak	Spacewatch	·	1.7 km	MPC · JPL
548888	2010 XF_{18}	—	December 2, 2010	Kitt Peak	Spacewatch	·	660 m	MPC · JPL
548889	2010 XN_{18}	—	September 25, 2001	Socorro	LINEAR	ADE	2.3 km	MPC · JPL
548890	2010 XZ_{19}	—	January 27, 2007	Mount Lemmon	Mount Lemmon Survey	·	1.1 km	MPC · JPL
548891	2010 XC_{20}	—	December 5, 2010	Mount Lemmon	Mount Lemmon Survey	·	1.3 km	MPC · JPL
548892	2010 XR_{21}	—	October 22, 2006	Mount Lemmon	Mount Lemmon Survey	ADE	1.9 km	MPC · JPL
548893	2010 XY_{24}	—	November 27, 2010	Catalina	CSS	·	1.8 km	MPC · JPL
548894	2010 XE_{26}	—	December 1, 2010	Mount Lemmon	Mount Lemmon Survey	·	1.7 km	MPC · JPL
548895	2010 XU_{29}	—	March 9, 2005	Mount Lemmon	Mount Lemmon Survey	·	610 m	MPC · JPL
548896	2010 XG_{30}	—	November 8, 2010	Mount Lemmon	Mount Lemmon Survey	ADE	1.6 km	MPC · JPL
548897	2010 XS_{32}	—	April 30, 2009	Mount Lemmon	Mount Lemmon Survey	·	1.7 km	MPC · JPL
548898	2010 XB_{35}	—	December 13, 2006	Kitt Peak	Spacewatch	·	1.4 km	MPC · JPL
548899	2010 XH_{36}	—	December 3, 2010	Mount Lemmon	Mount Lemmon Survey	·	1.4 km	MPC · JPL
548900	2010 XR_{37}	—	December 3, 2010	Mount Lemmon	Mount Lemmon Survey	·	1.3 km	MPC · JPL

== 548901–549000 ==
back to top

Designation			Discovery			Properties		Ref
Permanent	Provisional	Named after	Date	Site	Discoverer(s)	Category	Diam.	Ref
548901	2010 XE_{45}	—	August 14, 2001	Palomar	NEAT	·	1.7 km	MPC · JPL
548902	2010 XP_{47}	—	December 21, 2006	Kitt Peak	Spacewatch	MRX	780 m	MPC · JPL
548903	2010 XQ_{48}	—	September 11, 2010	Kitt Peak	Spacewatch	·	1.8 km	MPC · JPL
548904	2010 XS_{48}	—	December 6, 2010	Catalina	CSS	·	1.8 km	MPC · JPL
548905	2010 XD_{50}	—	December 8, 2010	Kitt Peak	Spacewatch	·	1.9 km	MPC · JPL
548906	2010 XZ_{53}	—	November 26, 2010	Mount Lemmon	Mount Lemmon Survey	·	670 m	MPC · JPL
548907	2010 XK_{55}	—	November 5, 2010	Kitt Peak	Spacewatch	·	1.5 km	MPC · JPL
548908	2010 XQ_{55}	—	September 21, 2009	Catalina	CSS	·	2.2 km	MPC · JPL
548909	2010 XY_{56}	—	November 10, 2010	Mount Lemmon	Mount Lemmon Survey	(5)	1.1 km	MPC · JPL
548910	2010 XM_{57}	—	October 10, 2001	Palomar	NEAT	·	1.6 km	MPC · JPL
548911	2010 XY_{59}	—	July 29, 2009	Kitt Peak	Spacewatch	·	2.0 km	MPC · JPL
548912	2010 XY_{60}	—	April 15, 2008	Mount Lemmon	Mount Lemmon Survey	·	1.6 km	MPC · JPL
548913	2010 XE_{64}	—	December 30, 2000	Socorro	LINEAR	PHO	1.0 km	MPC · JPL
548914	2010 XJ_{69}	—	December 3, 2010	Mount Lemmon	Mount Lemmon Survey	·	1.6 km	MPC · JPL
548915	2010 XL_{73}	—	March 10, 2008	Mount Lemmon	Mount Lemmon Survey	·	1.8 km	MPC · JPL
548916	2010 XN_{77}	—	October 1, 2005	Catalina	CSS	·	2.0 km	MPC · JPL
548917	2010 XJ_{78}	—	November 12, 2010	Mount Lemmon	Mount Lemmon Survey	·	2.0 km	MPC · JPL
548918	2010 XX_{78}	—	December 4, 2010	Mount Lemmon	Mount Lemmon Survey	MRX	970 m	MPC · JPL
548919	2010 XN_{81}	—	December 11, 2010	Mount Lemmon	Mount Lemmon Survey	H	350 m	MPC · JPL
548920	2010 XN_{82}	—	March 12, 2008	Kitt Peak	Spacewatch	·	1.9 km	MPC · JPL
548921	2010 XP_{84}	—	December 3, 2010	Mount Lemmon	Mount Lemmon Survey	·	630 m	MPC · JPL
548922	2010 XV_{86}	—	October 2, 2005	Palomar	NEAT	·	2.2 km	MPC · JPL
548923	2010 XB_{93}	—	May 23, 2001	Cerro Tololo	Deep Ecliptic Survey	·	990 m	MPC · JPL
548924	2010 XK_{93}	—	December 14, 2010	Mount Lemmon	Mount Lemmon Survey	·	1.6 km	MPC · JPL
548925	2010 XD_{94}	—	November 12, 2010	Mount Lemmon	Mount Lemmon Survey	AEO	870 m	MPC · JPL
548926	2010 XM_{94}	—	April 13, 2013	Haleakala	Pan-STARRS 1	·	1.3 km	MPC · JPL
548927	2010 XZ_{94}	—	December 5, 2010	Mount Lemmon	Mount Lemmon Survey	·	2.8 km	MPC · JPL
548928	2010 XJ_{95}	—	May 1, 2013	Mount Lemmon	Mount Lemmon Survey	·	1.2 km	MPC · JPL
548929	2010 XE_{97}	—	January 20, 2015	Haleakala	Pan-STARRS 1	V	500 m	MPC · JPL
548930	2010 XW_{98}	—	November 1, 2010	Kitt Peak	Spacewatch	EOS	1.3 km	MPC · JPL
548931	2010 XY_{99}	—	December 2, 2010	Mount Lemmon	Mount Lemmon Survey	·	1.7 km	MPC · JPL
548932	2010 XE_{100}	—	December 10, 2010	Mount Lemmon	Mount Lemmon Survey	·	1.7 km	MPC · JPL
548933	2010 XU_{100}	—	December 6, 2010	Mount Lemmon	Mount Lemmon Survey	·	670 m	MPC · JPL
548934	2010 XR_{101}	—	March 12, 2012	Kitt Peak	Spacewatch	·	1.9 km	MPC · JPL
548935	2010 XZ_{102}	—	April 26, 2017	Haleakala	Pan-STARRS 1	·	1.4 km	MPC · JPL
548936	2010 XH_{104}	—	October 27, 2013	Kitt Peak	Spacewatch	·	560 m	MPC · JPL
548937	2010 XZ_{106}	—	March 13, 2012	Mount Lemmon	Mount Lemmon Survey	·	1.3 km	MPC · JPL
548938	2010 XC_{109}	—	December 10, 2010	Mount Lemmon	Mount Lemmon Survey	·	1.6 km	MPC · JPL
548939	2010 XZ_{114}	—	December 21, 2003	Kitt Peak	Spacewatch	BAP	620 m	MPC · JPL
548940	2010 YL_{1}	—	December 25, 2010	Mount Lemmon	Mount Lemmon Survey	·	1.6 km	MPC · JPL
548941	2010 YN_{5}	—	August 16, 2009	Kitt Peak	Spacewatch	·	2.4 km	MPC · JPL
548942	2011 AL_{4}	—	November 15, 2010	Mount Lemmon	Mount Lemmon Survey	·	2.0 km	MPC · JPL
548943	2011 AJ_{5}	—	December 29, 2000	Haleakala	NEAT	·	4.2 km	MPC · JPL
548944	2011 AP_{6}	—	September 20, 2003	Palomar	NEAT	·	770 m	MPC · JPL
548945	2011 AZ_{6}	—	January 2, 2011	Mount Lemmon	Mount Lemmon Survey	·	1.4 km	MPC · JPL
548946	2011 AR_{10}	—	December 14, 2010	Mount Lemmon	Mount Lemmon Survey	·	1.0 km	MPC · JPL
548947	2011 AX_{12}	—	January 21, 2001	Socorro	LINEAR	·	730 m	MPC · JPL
548948	2011 AF_{15}	—	December 2, 2010	Kitt Peak	Spacewatch	DOR	2.2 km	MPC · JPL
548949	2011 AB_{16}	—	December 1, 2005	Palomar	NEAT	·	2.1 km	MPC · JPL
548950	2011 AY_{17}	—	January 24, 2003	Palomar	NEAT	·	1.7 km	MPC · JPL
548951	2011 AL_{19}	—	April 2, 2005	Kitt Peak	Spacewatch	·	540 m	MPC · JPL
548952	2011 AZ_{20}	—	January 9, 2011	Mount Lemmon	Mount Lemmon Survey	H	490 m	MPC · JPL
548953	2011 AE_{23}	—	November 15, 2010	Mount Lemmon	Mount Lemmon Survey	·	1.3 km	MPC · JPL
548954	2011 AR_{23}	—	January 3, 2011	Catalina	CSS	H	480 m	MPC · JPL
548955	2011 AU_{25}	—	January 3, 2011	Mount Lemmon	Mount Lemmon Survey	·	1.8 km	MPC · JPL
548956	2011 AV_{26}	—	July 8, 2005	Kitt Peak	Spacewatch	·	1.7 km	MPC · JPL
548957	2011 AC_{36}	—	January 11, 2011	Kitt Peak	Spacewatch	·	1.6 km	MPC · JPL
548958	2011 AC_{38}	—	August 3, 2000	Kitt Peak	Spacewatch	·	860 m	MPC · JPL
548959	2011 AN_{39}	—	January 10, 2011	Mount Lemmon	Mount Lemmon Survey	·	2.0 km	MPC · JPL
548960	2011 AK_{41}	—	October 21, 2003	Palomar	NEAT	·	630 m	MPC · JPL
548961	2011 AB_{46}	—	November 19, 2003	Palomar	NEAT	·	790 m	MPC · JPL
548962	2011 AZ_{46}	—	October 20, 2006	Mount Lemmon	Mount Lemmon Survey	·	810 m	MPC · JPL
548963	2011 AN_{47}	—	September 25, 2006	Mount Lemmon	Mount Lemmon Survey	·	890 m	MPC · JPL
548964	2011 AP_{47}	—	August 23, 2004	Kitt Peak	Spacewatch	·	1.8 km	MPC · JPL
548965	2011 AE_{50}	—	January 13, 2011	Mount Lemmon	Mount Lemmon Survey	·	2.0 km	MPC · JPL
548966	2011 AA_{54}	—	September 18, 2003	Kitt Peak	Spacewatch	·	2.6 km	MPC · JPL
548967	2011 AP_{56}	—	November 26, 2003	Kitt Peak	Spacewatch	·	540 m	MPC · JPL
548968	2011 AE_{57}	—	October 22, 2003	Apache Point	SDSS Collaboration	·	550 m	MPC · JPL
548969	2011 AP_{63}	—	January 19, 2001	Kitt Peak	Spacewatch	·	840 m	MPC · JPL
548970	2011 AW_{65}	—	January 14, 2011	Kitt Peak	Spacewatch	·	3.0 km	MPC · JPL
548971	2011 AE_{71}	—	March 15, 2004	Kitt Peak	Spacewatch	V	670 m	MPC · JPL
548972	2011 AZ_{80}	—	September 5, 2008	Kitt Peak	Spacewatch	·	3.4 km	MPC · JPL
548973	2011 AN_{83}	—	January 13, 2011	Kitt Peak	Spacewatch	·	700 m	MPC · JPL
548974	2011 AK_{84}	—	October 13, 2013	Mount Lemmon	Mount Lemmon Survey	·	700 m	MPC · JPL
548975	2011 AQ_{84}	—	January 13, 2011	Mount Lemmon	Mount Lemmon Survey	·	2.2 km	MPC · JPL
548976	2011 AJ_{85}	—	August 25, 2014	Haleakala	Pan-STARRS 1	·	1.5 km	MPC · JPL
548977	2011 AE_{86}	—	December 5, 2010	Kitt Peak	Spacewatch	·	640 m	MPC · JPL
548978	2011 AQ_{86}	—	January 12, 2011	Mount Lemmon	Mount Lemmon Survey	·	2.7 km	MPC · JPL
548979	2011 AP_{87}	—	January 8, 2011	Mount Lemmon	Mount Lemmon Survey	PHO	750 m	MPC · JPL
548980	2011 AH_{88}	—	November 22, 2006	Kitt Peak	Spacewatch	·	660 m	MPC · JPL
548981	2011 AQ_{90}	—	December 19, 2015	Mount Lemmon	Mount Lemmon Survey	·	1.9 km	MPC · JPL
548982	2011 AK_{91}	—	May 19, 2017	Mount Lemmon	Mount Lemmon Survey	EUN	1.0 km	MPC · JPL
548983	2011 AR_{91}	—	February 10, 2015	Mount Lemmon	Mount Lemmon Survey	·	840 m	MPC · JPL
548984	2011 AL_{93}	—	October 28, 2014	Haleakala	Pan-STARRS 1	·	1.7 km	MPC · JPL
548985	2011 AR_{94}	—	March 8, 2005	Kitt Peak	Spacewatch	·	750 m	MPC · JPL
548986	2011 AH_{97}	—	January 8, 2011	Mount Lemmon	Mount Lemmon Survey	·	1.7 km	MPC · JPL
548987	2011 AZ_{97}	—	January 2, 2011	Mount Lemmon	Mount Lemmon Survey	HOF	2.2 km	MPC · JPL
548988	2011 AC_{98}	—	January 2, 2011	Mount Lemmon	Mount Lemmon Survey	·	1.4 km	MPC · JPL
548989	2011 AE_{98}	—	December 21, 2005	Kitt Peak	Spacewatch	·	1.4 km	MPC · JPL
548990	2011 AJ_{98}	—	January 14, 2011	Mount Lemmon	Mount Lemmon Survey	·	620 m	MPC · JPL
548991	2011 BD_{1}	—	April 8, 2008	Kitt Peak	Spacewatch	·	810 m	MPC · JPL
548992	2011 BT_{5}	—	January 16, 2011	Mount Lemmon	Mount Lemmon Survey	EUN	1.2 km	MPC · JPL
548993	2011 BP_{6}	—	January 16, 2011	Mount Lemmon	Mount Lemmon Survey	·	1.4 km	MPC · JPL
548994	2011 BA_{8}	—	March 8, 2003	Kitt Peak	Spacewatch	·	1.9 km	MPC · JPL
548995	2011 BL_{15}	—	January 13, 2011	Kitt Peak	Spacewatch	·	1.6 km	MPC · JPL
548996	2011 BR_{17}	—	August 17, 2006	Palomar	NEAT	·	800 m	MPC · JPL
548997	2011 BY_{17}	—	January 13, 2011	Kitt Peak	Spacewatch	H	450 m	MPC · JPL
548998	2011 BF_{20}	—	February 24, 2006	Palomar	NEAT	·	1.7 km	MPC · JPL
548999	2011 BY_{20}	—	January 23, 2011	Mount Lemmon	Mount Lemmon Survey	·	800 m	MPC · JPL
549000	2011 BX_{24}	—	November 10, 2006	Kitt Peak	Spacewatch	NYS	860 m	MPC · JPL

back to top

== Meaning of names ==
As minor planet discoveries are confirmed, they are given a permanent number by the IAU's Minor Planet Center (MPC), and the discoverers can then submit names for them, following the IAU's naming conventions. The list below concerns those minor planets in the specified number-range that have received names, and explains the meanings of those names.

Official naming citations of newly named small Solar System bodies are approved and published in a bulletin by IAU's Working Group for Small Bodies Nomenclature (WGSBN). Before May 2021, citations were published in MPC's Minor Planet Circulars for many decades. Recent citations can also be found on the JPL Small-Body Database (SBDB). Until his death in 2016, German astronomer Lutz D. Schmadel compiled these citations into the Dictionary of Minor Planet Names (DMP) and regularly updated the collection.

Based on Paul Herget's The Names of the Minor Planets, Schmadel also researched the unclear origin of numerous asteroids, most of which had been named prior to World War II. This article incorporates text from this source, which is in the public domain: SBDB New namings may only be added to this list below after official publication as the preannouncement of names is condemned. The WGSBN publishes a comprehensive guideline for the naming rules of non-cometary small Solar System bodies.

Named minor planet	Provisional	This minor planet was named for...	Ref · Catalog
548032 Ensisheim	2010 BU_{4}	Ensisheim is a commune in the Haut-Rhin department of eastern France, about 15 km north of Mulhouse. It is well known for the fall of the Ensisheim meteorite on 1492 November 7, the oldest recorded meteorite fall in Europe.	IAU · 548032
548263 Alexandertutov	2010 FD_{10}	Alexander Nikolaevich Tutov (1966–2018), a Russian doctor and fantasy writer.	IAU · 548263
548624 Ekwerike	2010 TL_{78}	Alphonsus Ekwerike (1960–2022), a Nigerian astronomer, and the first asteroid-discovering Nigerian.	IAU · 548624
548690 Hazucha	2010 UC_{30}	Pavol Hazucha (1939–2022), a secondary school teacher of physics in Hlohovec, Slovakia.	IAU · 548690
548715 Stus	2010 UC_{106}	Vasyl' Semenovych Stus (1938–1985), Ukrainian poet, prose writer and literary critic.	IAU · 548715
