= András Révész =

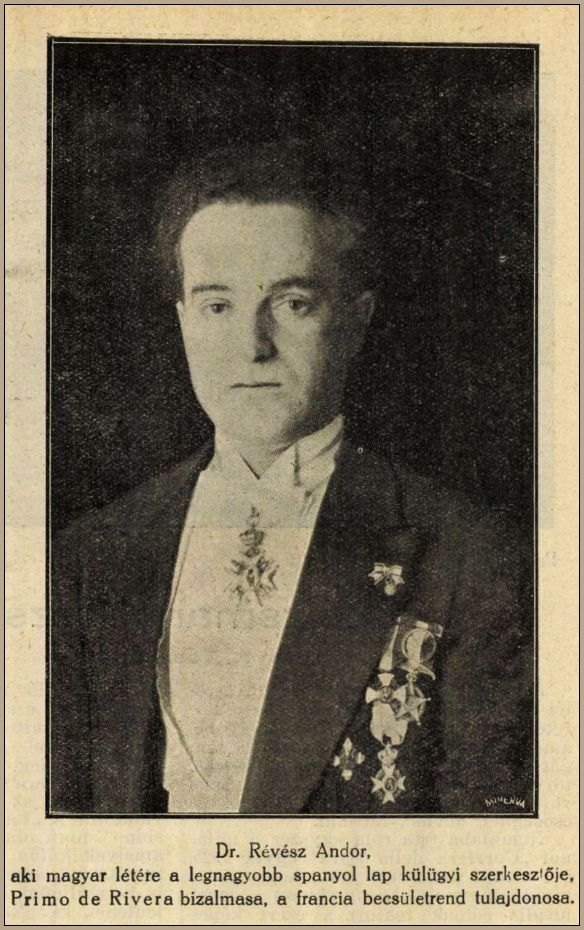
Andor Révész (Galgóc, October 4, 1890 – Madrid, June 13, 1970) is a Hungarian journalist and writer. At the outbreak of the First World War, he settled in Spain, and his work is largely tied there.

Andor Révész (born Galgóc, now Hlohovec, Slovakia; 1896–1970), also known as Andrés Révész Speier, was a Hungarian biographer, journalist, and writer.
