= Hlohovec =

- Municipality
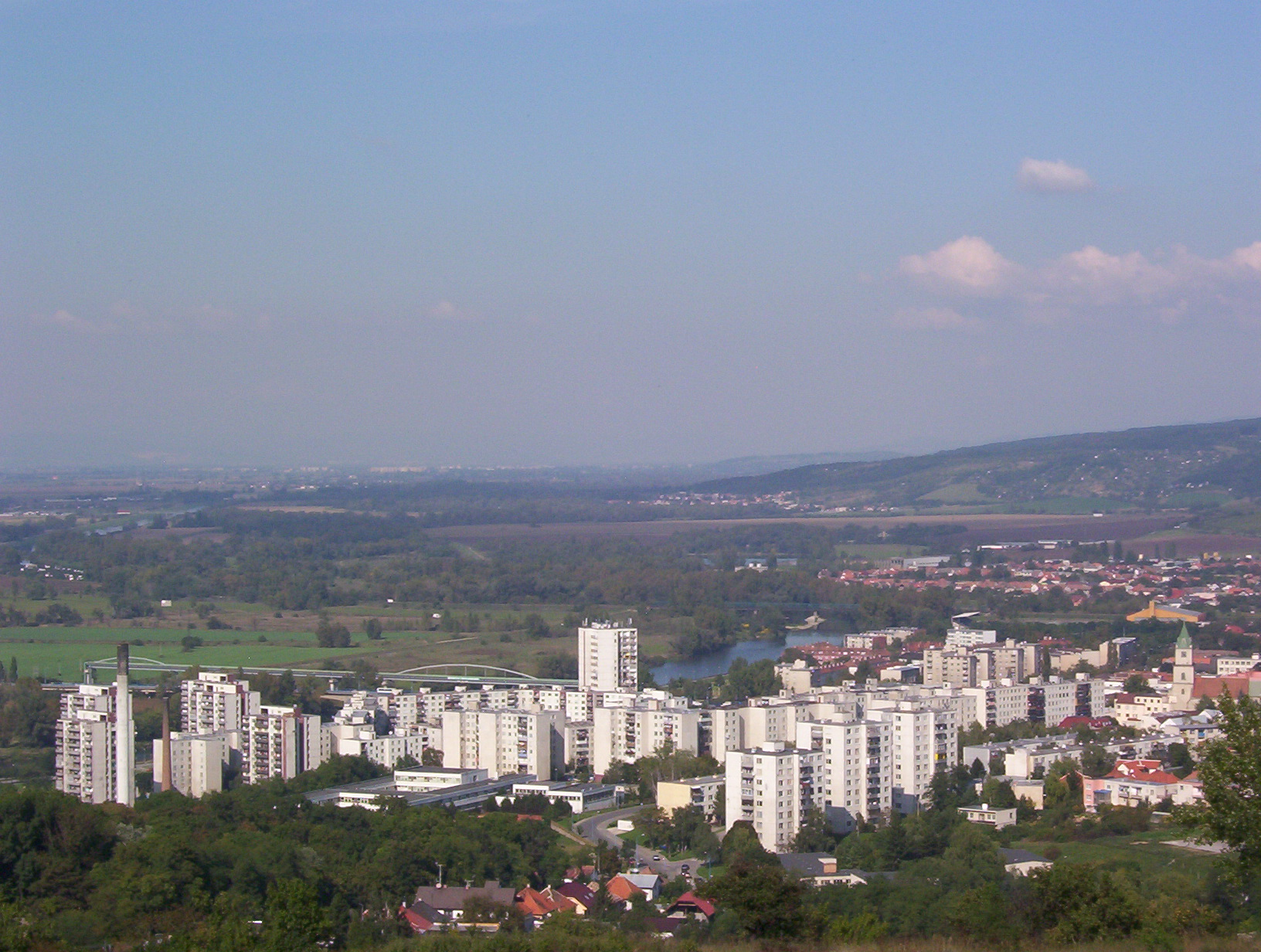
- Hlohovec, view from south

- Flag Coat of arms

- Location of Hlohovec in the Trnava Region Location of Hlohovec in Slovakia
- Coordinates: 48.43°N 17.80°E
- Country: Slovakia
- Region: Trnava Region
- District: Hlohovec District
- First mentioned: 1113

Government
  - Mayor: Ivan Baranovič

Area
  - Total: 64.12 km^{2} (24.76 sq mi)
- Elevation: 146 m (479 ft)

Population (2025)
  - Total: 19,214
- Time zone: UTC+1 (CET)
  - Summer (DST): UTC+2 (CEST)
- Postal code: 920 01
- Area code: +421 33
- Vehicle registration plate (until 2022): HC
- Website: www.hlohovec.sk

Hlohovec (German: Freistad(l) an der Waag, Hungarian: Galgóc), is a town in southwestern Slovakia, with a population of 21,508.

== Geography ==
The municipality lies at an altitude of 146 metres (479 ft) and covers an area of 64.12 km^{2} (24.76 sq mi) (2025).

== Name ==
The name comes from *Glogovec, the Old Slavic name for a place densely overgrown by hawthorn. The Hungarian form Galgóc was adopted before a phonological change g > h in Slovak. The German name, Freistad an der Waag means "Free City on the Váh". Hlohovec used to have a nickname in Slovak, Frajšták, which was borrowed from the German Freistad. This nickname survives in the nickname for its inhabitants, Fraštačani.

== History ==
The first written evidence of its existence is from 1113, when a town with the name Galgocz was mentioned in the so-called Second Zobor Document. In 1362, Hlohovec obtained town privileges. Ottoman troops captured city and annexed it to the sanjak of Uyvar as the Holok eyalet in 1663. Austrian troops retook it in 1664.

== Landmarks ==
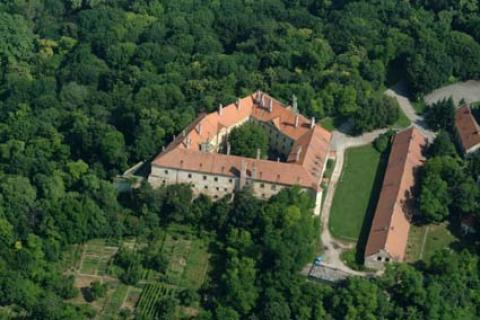
Aerial photography of the castle

The dominant building is a Renaissance-Baroque Erdődy-castle built in 1720. The castle is built on the place of a pre-existing Slavic settlement and a medieval castle. In the castle area is the Empire theatre built in 1802, a riding school from the 18th century, and a Baroque garden pavilion.

In the middle of St. Michael Square stands the Gothic church of St. Michael with its highly decorated portal. Next to the church is the Chapel of Saint Anna from the 18th century. On the northern border of the central part of the town is the Franciscan church and monastery built in 1492. Part of the monastery premises nowadays occupies the Museum of National History and Geography.

The most visited part of town is the castle park with its lake, French terraces, and rare wood species, especially old sycamore trees.

== Population ==
Historical population
Year	Pop.	±%
1970	17,881	—
1980	21,148	+18.3%
1991	23,409	+10.7%
2001	23,729	+1.4%
2011	22,701	−4.3%
2021	20,556	−9.4%
Source: Censuses

Population statistic (10 years)
Year	1995	2005	2015	2025
Count	24,121	23,029	22,079	19,214
Difference		−4.52%	−4.12%	−12.97%

Population statistic
Year	2024	2025
Count	19,458	19,214
Difference		−1.25%

It has a population of 19,214 people (31 December 2025).

According to the 1910 census the town had 7749 inhabitants: 5645 Slovaks, 1401 Hungarians and 667 Germans, 83.6% of the people were Roman Catholic, 13.7% Jewish and 2.1% Lutheran.

=== Ethnicity ===
Census 2021 (1+ %)
Ethnicity	Number	Fraction
Slovak	19,000	92.43%
Not found out	1457	7.08%
Total	20,556	

In year 2021 was 20,556 people by ethnicity 19,000 as Slovak, 1457 as Not found out, 131 as Czech, 49 as Other, 48 as Hungarian, 42 as Romani, 24 as Russian, 15 as Vietnamese, 15 as Serbian, 15 as German, 12 as Ukrainian, 11 as Rusyn, 10 as Polish, 9 as Jewish, 9 as Bulgarian, 8 as Croatian, 7 as Chinese, 7 as Italian, 4 as Moravian, 4 as Albanian, 3 as French, 2 as Silesian, 2 as Romanian, 1 as Irish, 1 as Austrian, 1 as Canadian, 1 as Greek and 1 as English.

Note on population: The difference values of population numbers in the table "Population statistic" and in the sections "Ethnicity" & "Religion" is caused by the use of various statistical methods.

=== Religion ===
Census 2021 (1+ %)
Religion	Number	Fraction
Roman Catholic Church	12,476	60.69%
None	5358	26.07%
Not found out	1706	8.3%
Evangelical Church	449	2.18%
Total	20,556	

In year 2021 was 20,556 people by religion 12,476 from Roman Catholic Church, 5358 from None, 1706 from Not found out, 449 from Evangelical Church, 89 from Greek Catholic Church, 84 from Ad hoc movements, 79 from Christian Congregations in Slovakia, 61 from Other, 36 from Eastern Orthodox Church, 35 from Jehovah's Witnesses, 32 from Other and not ascertained christian church, 29 from Buddhism, 27 from Calvinist Church, 24 from Paganism and natural spirituality, 24 from Apostolic Church, 13 from Old Catholic Church, 12 from Islam, 5 from Czechoslovak Hussite Church, 4 from Seventh-day Adventist Church, 3 from Hinduism, 2 from United Methodist Church, 2 from Church of the Brethren, 2 from Baptists Church, 1 from Jewish community, 1 from New Apostolic Church, 1 from Church of Jesus Christ of Latter-day Saints and 1 from Bahá'i Community.

== Notable people ==
- Heinrich Berté (1858-1924), composer of Dreimäderlhaus.
- Peter Burian (b. 1959), diplomat
- Ján Hollý (1785–1849), writer
- Miroslav Karhan (b. 1976), footballer
- Richard Müller (b. 1961) singer-songwriter
- Ladislav Kuna (1947–2012), footballer
- András Révész (1896–1970), biographer, journalist, and writer
- Jozef Seilnacht (1859–1939), altar builder
- Viera Strnisková (1929-2013), actress

== Twin towns — sister cities ==
Hlohovec is twinned with:

- De Panne, Belgium
- Hranice, Czech Republic
- Slovenske Konjice, Slovenia

== See also ==
- List of municipalities and towns in Slovakia

== Genealogical resources ==
The records for genealogical research are available at the state archive "Statny Archiv in Bratislava, Nitra, Slovakia"

- Roman Catholic church records (births/marriages/deaths): 1660_1901 (parish A)
- Lutheran church records (births/marriages/deaths): 1792-1928 (parish B)
