= Embassy of the United States, Kyiv =

Diplomatic mission of the US in Ukraine

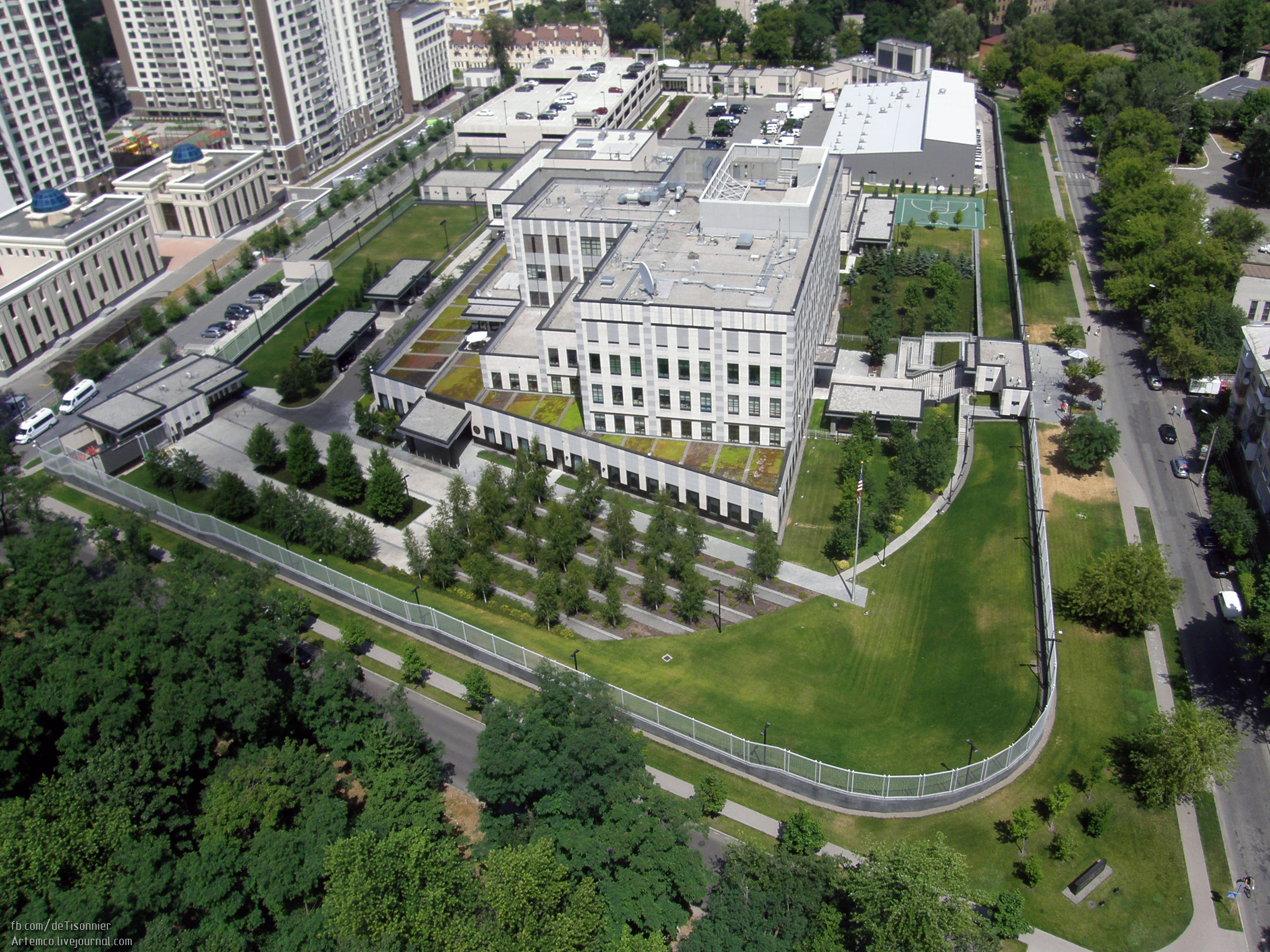
- Location: 4 A.I. Sikorsky St. 04112 Kyiv, Ukraine
- Coordinates: 50.4650°N 30.4320°E
- Opened: 1992
- Relocated: 2012; 2022 (temporary)
- Ambassador: Paul R. Houston
- Jurisdiction: Ukraine
- Website: Official website

The Embassy of the United States of America in Kyiv is the diplomatic mission of the United States to Ukraine.

== History ==
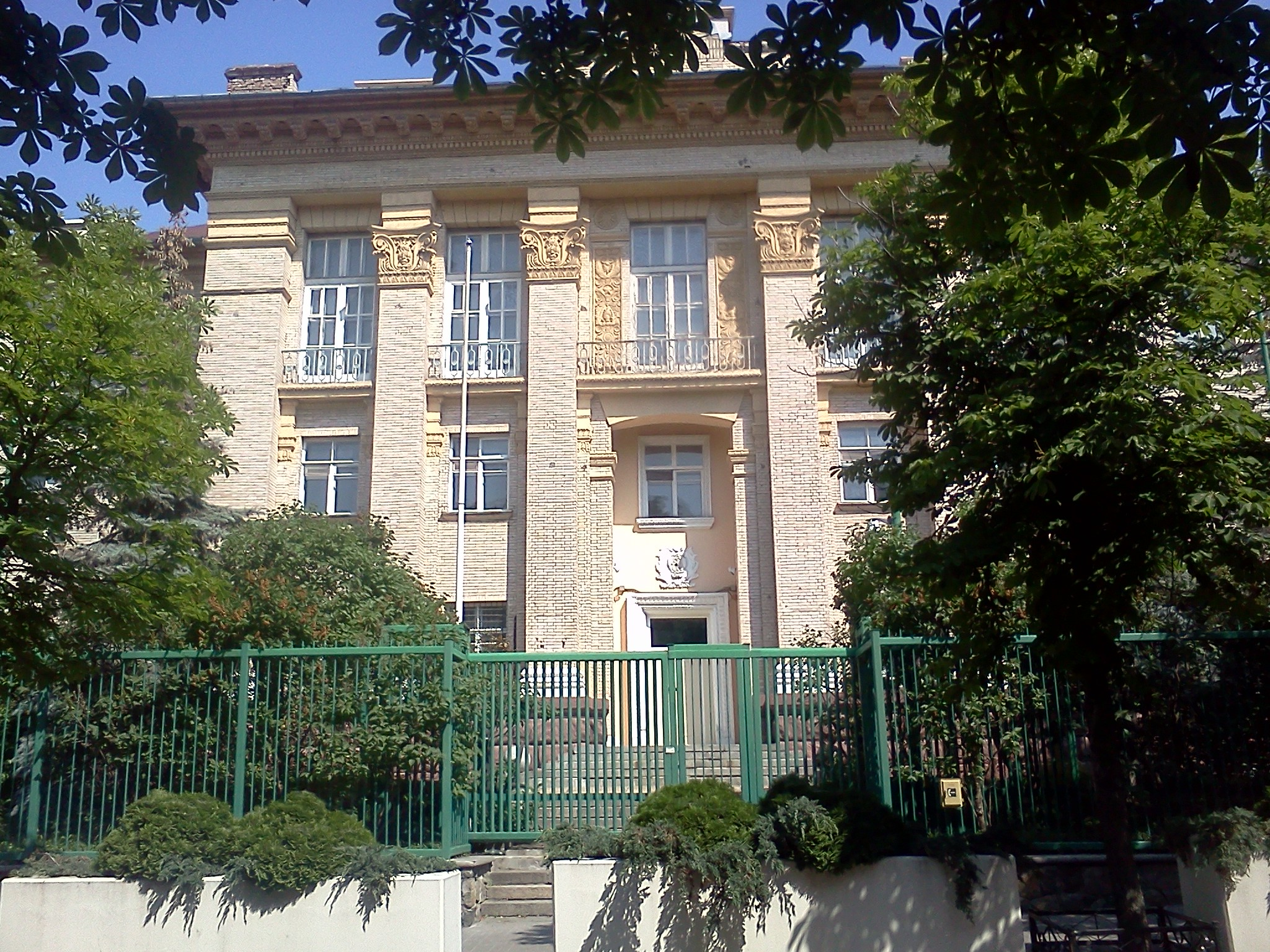
Previous building (former office of Communist Party) of the U.S. Embassy in Kyiv from 1992 to 2012

The United States recognized the independence of Ukraine on December 26, 1991, and opened an embassy in its capital, Kyiv, on January 22, 1992. This first embassy was located in the former regional office of the Communist Party of Ukraine for Kyiv's Shevchenkivskyi District that was confiscated from the Communists soon after the 1991 August putsch in Moscow. That building was erected sometime in the 1950s on the grounds of the Ukrainian Greek Catholic Church of the Sacred Heart of Jesus on present day 10 Volodymyr Vynnychenko Street, destroyed by the Soviets in 1935. This was in the mold of other newly independent states in Eastern Europe, where former Communist Party offices were chosen as they were often cheap and expansive enough for the newly needed embassies.

In 2012, the embassy moved to its current 4.5 hectare (11.1 acres) location, acquired for $247 million. The embassy is on Igor Sikorsky Street, close to Kyiv’s western outskirts, and 15 minutes walk from Beresteiska station. Previously known as Tankova Street, the street was renamed by the City Council after Ukrainian-born aircraft design engineer Igor Sikorsky, due to a request from the embassy.

On June 8, 2017, a blast occurred outside the embassy.

During the prelude to the Russian invasion of Ukraine, the embassy moved to Lviv, closer to the western border of the country with Poland, and adopted other security measures. As military buildup and tensions continued to rise, the embassy was relocated to Poland a couple days before Russia launched a full-scale invasion. The embassy was reopened on May 18, 2022.

=== Picketing ===
Since 2004, the embassy has been picketed annually on April 8 by the "Institute Republic" group of human rights activist Volodymyr Chemerys, due to the refusal of the US government to pay compensation for the death of Ukrainian journalist Taras Protsyuk, who perished in 2003 during the Iraq War.

== Staff ==
The U.S. Embassy in Kyiv is staffed by approximately 181 Americans and more than 560 Ukrainians.

The current acting Ambassador of the United States of America to Ukraine is Paul R. Houston. Key U.S. Embassy officials include:

- Deputy Chief of Mission
- Political Counselor
- Economic Counselor
- Public Affairs Counselor
- Consul General
- Management Counselor
- Commercial Officer
- USAID Mission Director
- Regional Security Officer
- Department of Energy Director
- Agricultural Attaché
- Defense Attaché
- Peace Corps Director

== List of chiefs of mission ==
U.S. Ambassadors, and Chargés d'Affaires (with blue background)
N	Ambassadors	Image	Term
#	Jon Gundersen		1992; Chargé d'Affaires
1	Roman Popadiuk		1992–1993
2	William Green Miller		1993–1998
3	Steven Karl Pifer		1998–2000
4	Carlos Pascual		2000–2003
5	John E. Herbst		2003–2006
6	William B. Taylor Jr.		2006–2009
7	John F. Tefft		2009–2013
8	Geoffrey R. Pyatt		2013–2016
9	Marie Yovanovitch		2016–2019
#	Joseph Pennington		2019; Acting Chargé d'Affaires
#	Kristina Kvien		2019; Chargé d'Affaires
#	William B. Taylor Jr.		2019–2020; Chargé d'Affaires
#	Kristina Kvien		2020–2022; Chargé d'Affaires
10	Bridget A. Brink		2022–2025
#	John Ginkel		2025; Chargé d'Affaires
#	Julie D. Fisher		2025–2026; Chargé d'Affaires
#	Daniel Bischof		2026; Chargé d'Affaires
#	Sandra Oudkirk		2026; Chargé d'Affaires
#	Paul R. Houston		2026; Chargé d'Affaires

== See also ==
- Ukraine–United States relations
- List of diplomatic missions in Ukraine
- Embassy of Ukraine, Washington, D.C.
- Ambassadors of the United States to Ukraine
- Ambassadors of Ukraine to the United States
