= Ukraine–United States relations =

- Ukraine: United States

Diplomatic mission
- Embassy of Ukraine, Washington, D.C.: Embassy of the United States, Kyiv

Envoy
- Vacant: Chargé d'affaires ad interim Paul R. Houston

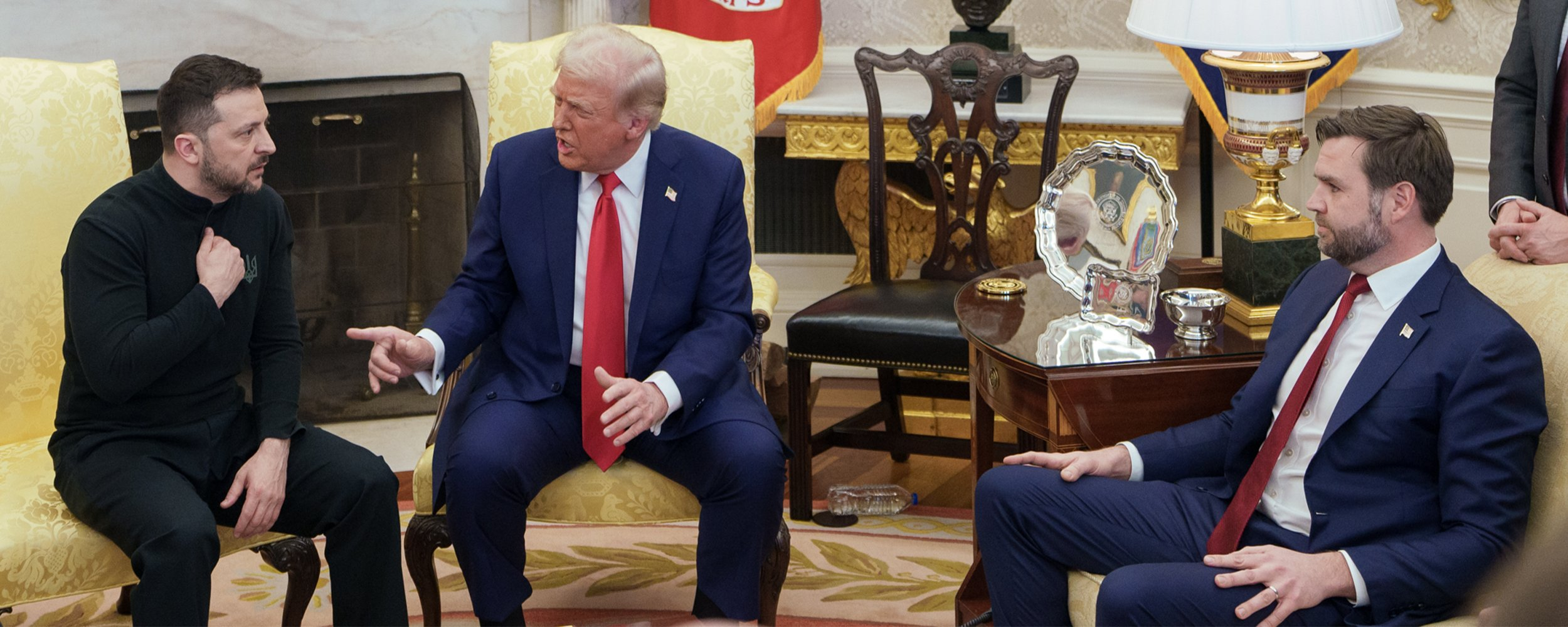
President Trump (middle) and Vice President Vance (right) of the United States meet President Zelenskyy (left) of Ukraine in the Oval Office on February 28, 2025.

Bilateral relations between Ukraine and the United States have existed since January 3, 1992. The United States recognized the independence of Ukraine on December 25, 1991 and upgraded its consulate in the capital, Kyiv, to embassy status on January 21, 1992.

In 2002, relations between the United States and Ukraine deteriorated after one of the recordings made during the Cassette Scandal revealed an alleged transfer of a sophisticated Ukrainian defense system to Saddam Hussein's Iraq.

In 2009, the United States announced support for Ukraine's bid to join NATO. According to documents uncovered during the United States diplomatic cables leak in 2010, American diplomats consistently defended Ukrainian sovereignty in meetings with other diplomats.

Following the 2014 Russian annexation of Crimea, the United States began to supply military aid to Ukraine and became one of the largest defense partners of the country. This increased after the Russian invasion of Ukraine in 2022, with the US massively increasing its supply of military aid and remaining one of the most important military backers of Ukraine, with US President Joe Biden heavily condemning the invasion and pledging support to Ukraine. A February 2023 Gallup poll found that the majority of Americans had a favorable view of Ukraine but the majority of Republicans and Democrats believed the Russian invasion of Ukraine was a critical threat to US vital interests. In December 2022, during a surprise visit to Washington D.C., Ukraine President Volodymyr Zelenskyy gave a speech to a joint session of Congress. He thanked Congress and the American people for the support and stated the resolve for victory in the war.

In early 2025, relations significantly worsened during Donald Trump's second presidency, amid calls for peace under his America First policy, though Trump has publicly cooperated with Zelenskyy, although many European leaders have repeatedly called his plan "Pro-Russian"and "Russian Wrote". In February 2025, Trump accused Ukraine of starting the war with Russia, and a meeting that month between Trump and Zelenskyy intending to finalize a minerals deal ended in public fallout and a shouting match between the leaders before the press. In March 2025, in a development attributed by journalists to disagreements during the meeting, the Trump administration briefly cut off all military aid and intelligence sharing to Ukraine. The military aid resumed days later.

Ukrainians have generally viewed the US positively, with 80% expressing a favorable view in 2002, and 60% in 2011. According to the 2012 US Global Leadership Report, 33% of Ukrainians approved of US leadership, with 26% disapproving and 41% uncertain. In terms of international cooperation, the US is an observer state of the BSCE which Ukraine is a member of, and both countries are also observer states in the CBSS.

== History ==
=== Ukrainian War of Independence ===
The history of informal American-Ukrainian diplomatic relations begins in 1919, when, in accordance with the resolution of the Directorate of Ukraine and in accordance with Order No. 6 of the Ministry of Foreign Affairs, the Extraordinary Diplomatic Mission of the Ukrainian People's Republic was sent to the United States of America, headed by Yevhen Holitsynsky (later replaced by Yulian Bachynsky who acted as head after Holitsynsky’s recall, while Yevhen Levytsky was formally appointed head on 16 July 1919, although Bachynsky continued to perform the leadership functions in practice.)

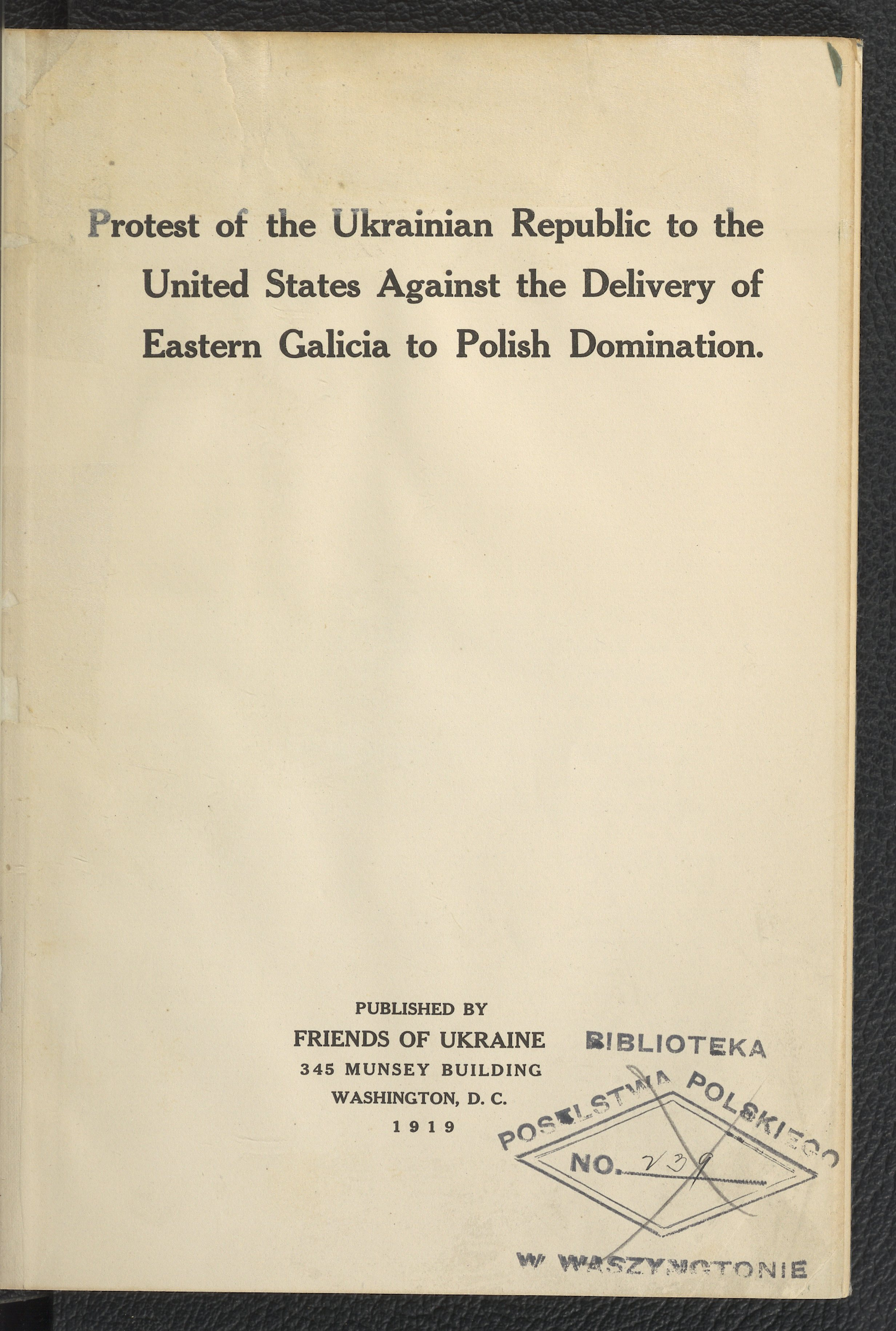
Protest of the Ukrainian Republic to the United States Against the Delivery of Eastern Galicia to Polish Domination

At the time, Ukrainian delegations failed to receive any support for Ukrainian War of Independence from both France and UK. Although some agreements were reached, neither of the states provided any actual support as in general their agenda was to restore Poland and unified anti-Bolshevik Russia. Thus, Ukrainian representatives Arnold Margolin and Teofil Okunevsky had high hopes for American mission, but in the end found it even more categorical than the French and British ones:

This meeting, which took place on June 30, made a tremendous impression on both Okunevsky and me. Lansing showed complete ignorance of the situation and blind faith in Kolchak and Denikin. He categorically insisted that the Ukrainian government recognise Kolchak as the supreme ruler and leader of all anti-Bolshevik armies. When it came to the Wilson principles, the application of which was predetermined in relation to the peoples of the former Austro-Hungarian monarchy, Lansing said that he knew only about the single Russian people and that the only way to restore Russia was a federation modeled on the United States. When I tried to prove to him that the example of the United States testifies to the need for the preliminary existence of separate states as subjects for any possible agreements between them in the future, he evaded answering and began again stubbornly urging us to recognise Kolchak. [...] That's how in reality these principles were implemented. USA supported Kolchak, England – Denikin and Yudenich, France – Galler... Only Petliura was left without any support.

— Arnold Margolin, Ukraine and Policy of the Entente (Notes of Jew and Citizen)

Without support, both the Ukrainian People's Republic and the Western Ukrainian People's Republic were unable to resist multiple invading forces and ultimately ceased to exist. The Government of the Ukrainian People's Republic went into exile. In their place, (Note: Excluding Western Ukraine and Bessarabia, which were divided between Poland, Romania, and Czechoslovakia. The majority of these territories became part of the Ukrainian SSR between 1939 and 1945.) the Bolsheviks established Soviet Ukraine, which was not recognized by the United States. In 1922, Soviet Ukraine, along with three other republics, co-founded the USSR.

=== Cold War ===
Ukrainian SSR–United States relations

- Ukrainian SSR: United States

Informal relations between the United States and Ukrainian nationalists date back to the early days of the Cold War, when the Central Intelligence Agency (CIA) cooperated with the Ukrainian independence movement in the Soviet Union, many of whom were former fascist collaborators. In the early 1950s, the CIA dropped nearly 85 Ukrainian agents in a clandestine operation over Soviet territory, where they were supposed to spark a nationalist uprising in the Ukrainian Soviet Socialist Republic. The operation proved a failure, however, and two-thirds of the agents were immediately captured or killed. The Americans, however, did not realize the failure of the operation until several years later.

=== 1991–2007 ===
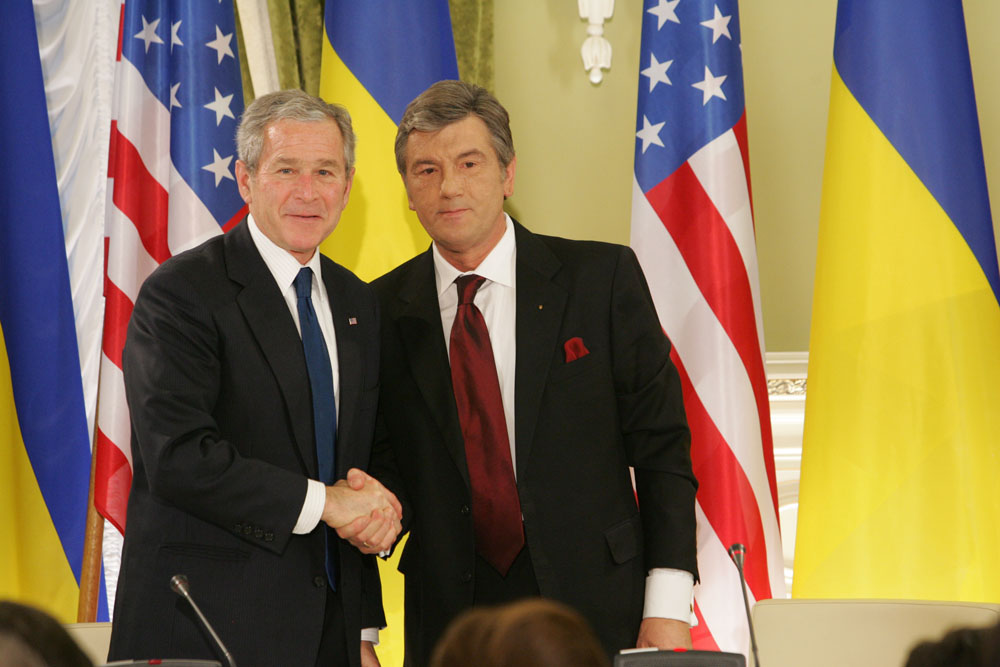
US President George W. Bush during meeting with Ukrainian President Viktor Yushchenko in Kyiv, 2008

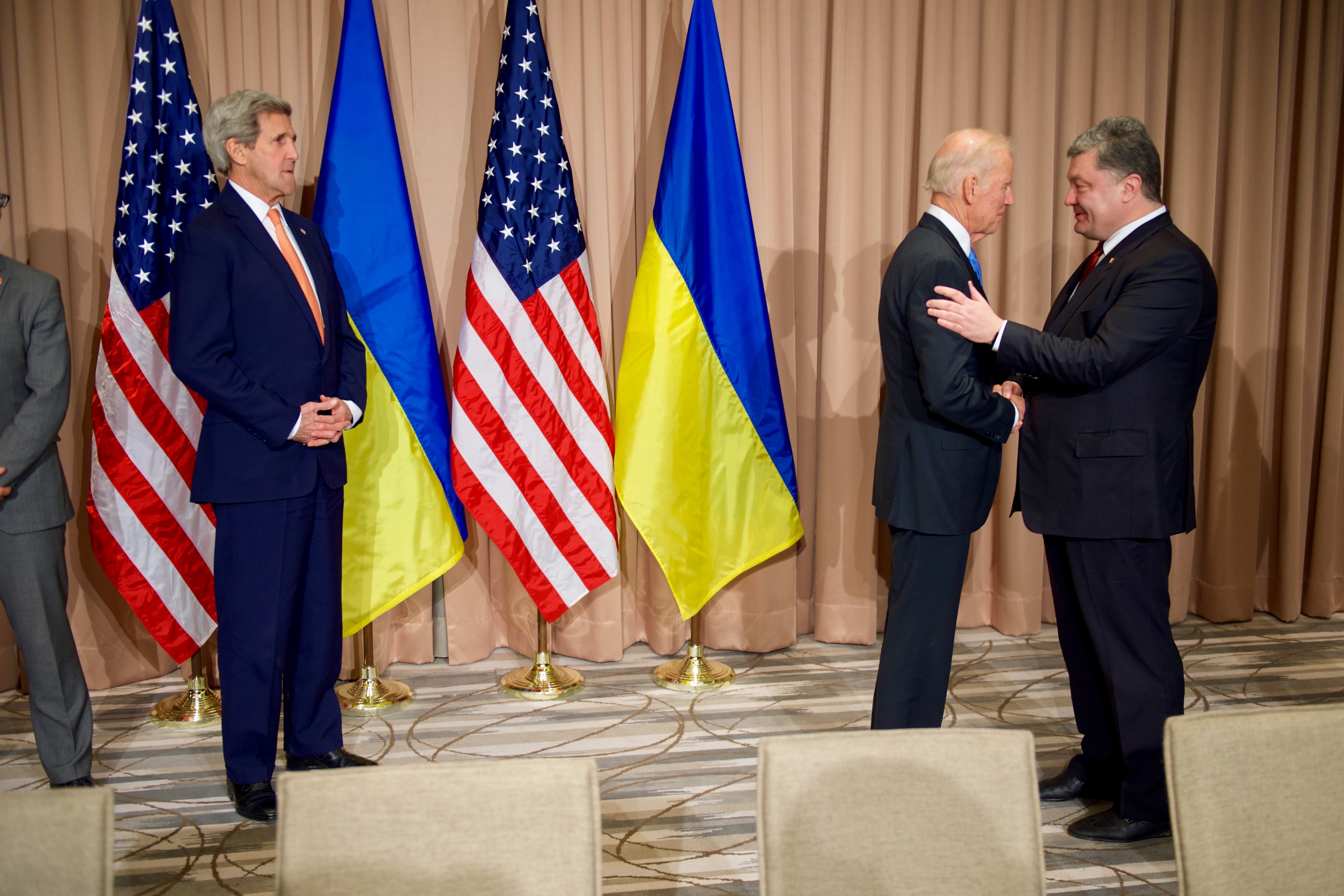
US Secretary of State John Kerry and U Vice President Joe Biden with Ukrainian President Petro Poroshenko on January 20, 2016

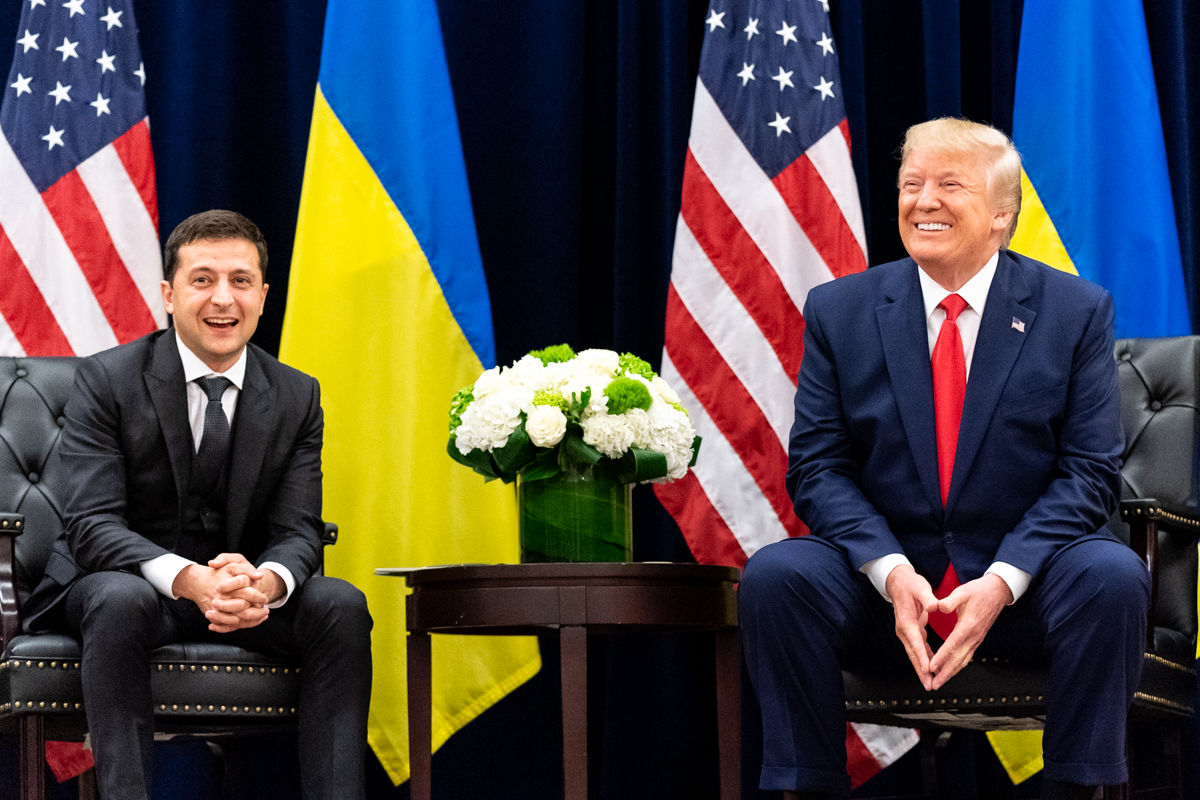
Ukrainian President Volodymyr Zelenskyy with US President Donald Trump in New York City, September 2019

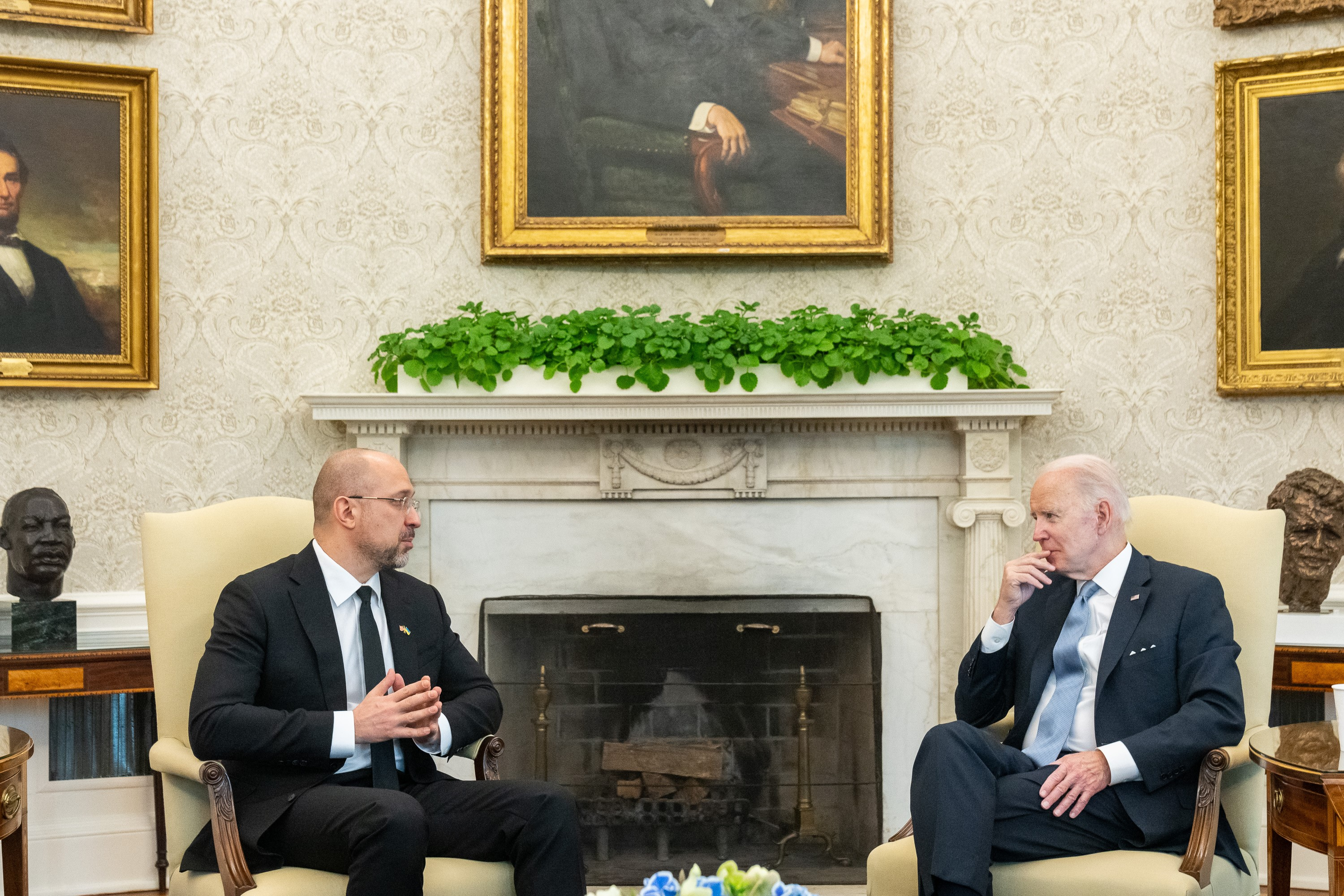
Ukrainian Prime Minister Denys Shmyhal with US President Joe Biden, April 2022

During the dissolution of the Soviet Union US government initially objected Ukraine's independence. In a speech later known as Chicken Kiev speech given by the US president George H. W. Bush in Kyiv on August 1, 1991, three weeks before the Declaration of Independence of Ukraine and four months before the December independence referendum in which 92.26% of Ukrainians voted to withdraw from the Soviet Union, he advised against independence. Instead, Bush endorsed an agreement reached the previous April between Gorbachev and nine of the republics, including Ukraine, that committed to a new Union Treaty establishing a more decentralised Soviet Union.

Following Ukraine's independence, the United States has generally enjoyed cordial diplomatic and trade relations with Ukraine. The Budapest Memorandum on Security Assurances, four substantially identical political agreements, was signed at the Conference on Security and Co-operation in Europe (CSCE) in Budapest, Hungary, on 5 December 1994, to provide security assurances by its signatories relating to the accession of Ukraine, (along with Belarus and Kazakhstan) to the Treaty on the Non-Proliferation of Nuclear Weapons (NPT). The four memoranda were originally signed by four nuclear powers: Ukraine, Russia, the United States, and the United Kingdom. France and China gave individual assurances in separate documents. As a result of the memorandum and other agreements, Ukraine gave up the nuclear weapons it had retained following the collapse of the Soviet Union.

Following a period of economic decline characterized by high inflation and a slowed transition from state economic controls, the Ukrainian government began taking steps in the fall of 1999 to speed the economic reforms that had been stalled for years due to a lack of majority support in the Ukrainian parliament. The Ukrainian government's stated determination to implement comprehensive economic reform was lauded as a welcome development by the US government, and the US reiterated its commitment to supporting Ukraine its transition.

Bilateral relations suffered a setback in September 2002 when the federal government of the US announced it had authenticated a recording of President Leonid Kuchma's July 2000 decision to transfer a Kolchuga early warning system to Iraq. The Government of Ukraine denied that the transfer had occurred.

Ukraine's democratic Orange Revolution led to closer cooperation and more open dialogue between Ukraine and the United States. US policy remained focused on realizing and strengthening a stable, democratic trade partner. On March 8, 2006, the U.S. House of Representatives passed a bill permanently exempting Ukraine from trade restrictions imposed under the 1974 Jackson–Vanik amendment.

Ukraine has been a primary recipient of FSA assistance. Total US assistance since independence has been more than $3 billion. US assistance to Ukraine is targeted to promote political and economic reform and to address urgent humanitarian needs. The US has consistently encouraged Ukraine's transition to a democratic society with a self-sustained market-based economy.

In November 2006, the Millennium Challenge Corporation (MCC) selected Ukraine to be eligible to apply for compact assistance. Ukraine was already a participant in the MCC Threshold Program, and in December 2006 signed a $45 million Threshold Program agreement. This program, which began implementation in early 2007, aims to reduce corruption in the public sector through civil society monitoring and advocacy, judicial reform, increased government monitoring and enforcement of ethical and administrative standards, streamlining and enforcing regulations, and combating corruption in higher education.

In addition to diplomatic support in its conflict with Russia, the US provided Ukraine with US$1.5 billion in military aid from 2014 to 2019.

=== Russo-Ukrainian War (2022-present) ===
==== Obama presidency ====
During Barack Hussein Obama's second presidency (2013-2017), Russia invaded the Ukraine and took the Crimea and the Donbas. Obama declared that Ukraine is a core Russian interest but not an American one, so Russia will always be able to maintain escalatory dominance there, and added: The fact is that Ukraine, which is a non-NATO country, is going to be vulnerable to military domination by Russia no matter what we do".

==== Biden presidency (2021–2025) ====
In January 2022, the US put 5,000–8,500 troops on high alert as tensions escalated in the Russo-Ukrainian War, expressing willingness to further help defend Ukraine before and when Russia launched its invasion a month later. The United States provided nearly $1 billion in military aid to Ukraine in 2021 and 2022, up to the first week of the invasion. Such aid included offensive weapons and sharing intelligence with the Ukrainian military. Ukrainian President Volodymyr Zelenskyy has repeatedly sent thanks to American leaders for the support.

In the 2022 State of the Union Address, which was attended by Ukrainian Ambassador Oksana Markarova, US President Joe Biden heavily criticized the invasion and pledged American support for Ukraine. American public opinion also heavily shifted towards supporting Ukraine following the invasion, however, Biden's successor, U.S President Donald Trump has shown almost no willingness to send troops into Ukraine, unlike many other European leaders.

External videos
- Zelenskyy's address to a joint meeting of the U.S. Congress, December 21, 2022, C-SPAN

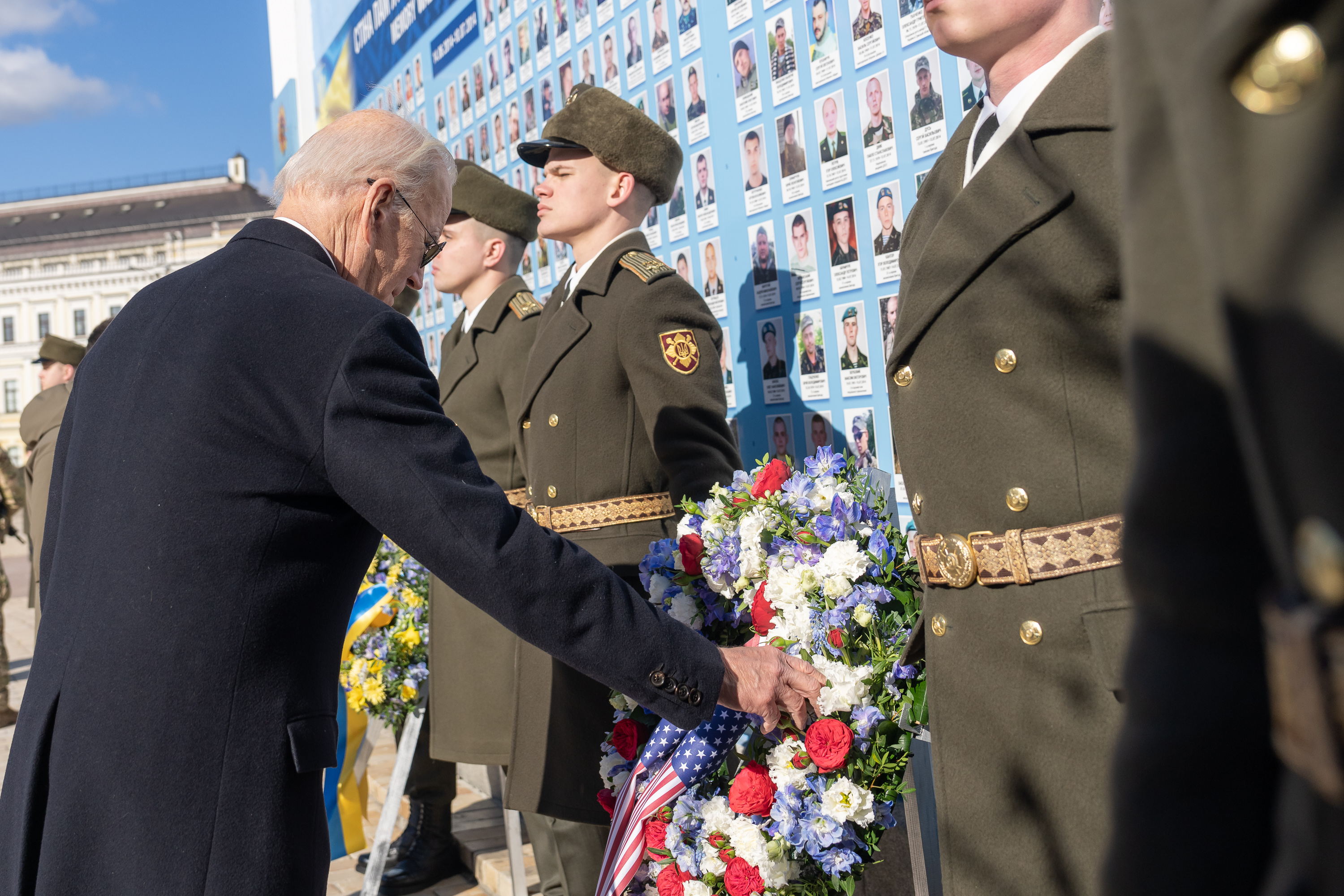
President Biden visits the war memorial for fallen Ukrainian soldiers in Kyiv, Ukraine, February 20, 2023.

In May 2022, the US Senate confirmed Bridget Brink to serve as ambassador to coincide with the reopening of the US embassy in Kyiv after it had closed due to the invasion. On December 21, 2022, Zelenskyy made his first foreign trip since the invasion to Washington DC. After meeting with President Biden, he gave a speech to a joint session of congress. The speech included references to Franklin D. Roosevelt's declaration of war on Japan and thanked the American congress and people for their support of Ukraine. On February 20, 2023, President Biden conducted an unannounced visit of Kyiv.

In 2022, Congress approved more than $112 billion to help Ukraine in its war with Russia. At the end of 2023, the Biden administration requested $61.4 billion more for Ukraine for the year ahead.

In April 2024, Ukraine received small arms and ammunition from Washington, which were intercepted while en route from Iranian forces to rebels in Yemen supported by Tehran. On April 20, 2024, the US House of Representatives approved a $95 billion aid package to Ukraine, Israel and Taiwan.

The US debated granting Ukraine permission to use long-range weapons within Russia. US officials did not believe that Ukraine had enough ATACMS and British Storm Shadow missiles to alter the course of the war, according to The New York Times. In September 2024, reporting renewed over a potential lifting of restrictions on Ukraine's use of Western long-range weapons on Russian territory. Biden met with British prime minister Keir Starmer on September 13 over the issue, though no official announcement was made.

On November 17, US President Joe Biden finally lifts restrictions on the Ukrainian use of U.S. weapons (including ATACMS), finally allowing Ukraine to use long-range missiles to strike deep inside Russia, with Ukrainian forces starting to use the weapons in long-distance attacks on November 19.

In December 2024, President Zelenskyy resisted pressure from the Biden administration to lower the conscription age to 18 to replace Ukraine's battlefield losses. In February 2025, he said that Ukraine would introduce special military contracts for volunteers aged 18 to 24.

==== Second Trump presidency (2025–present) ====
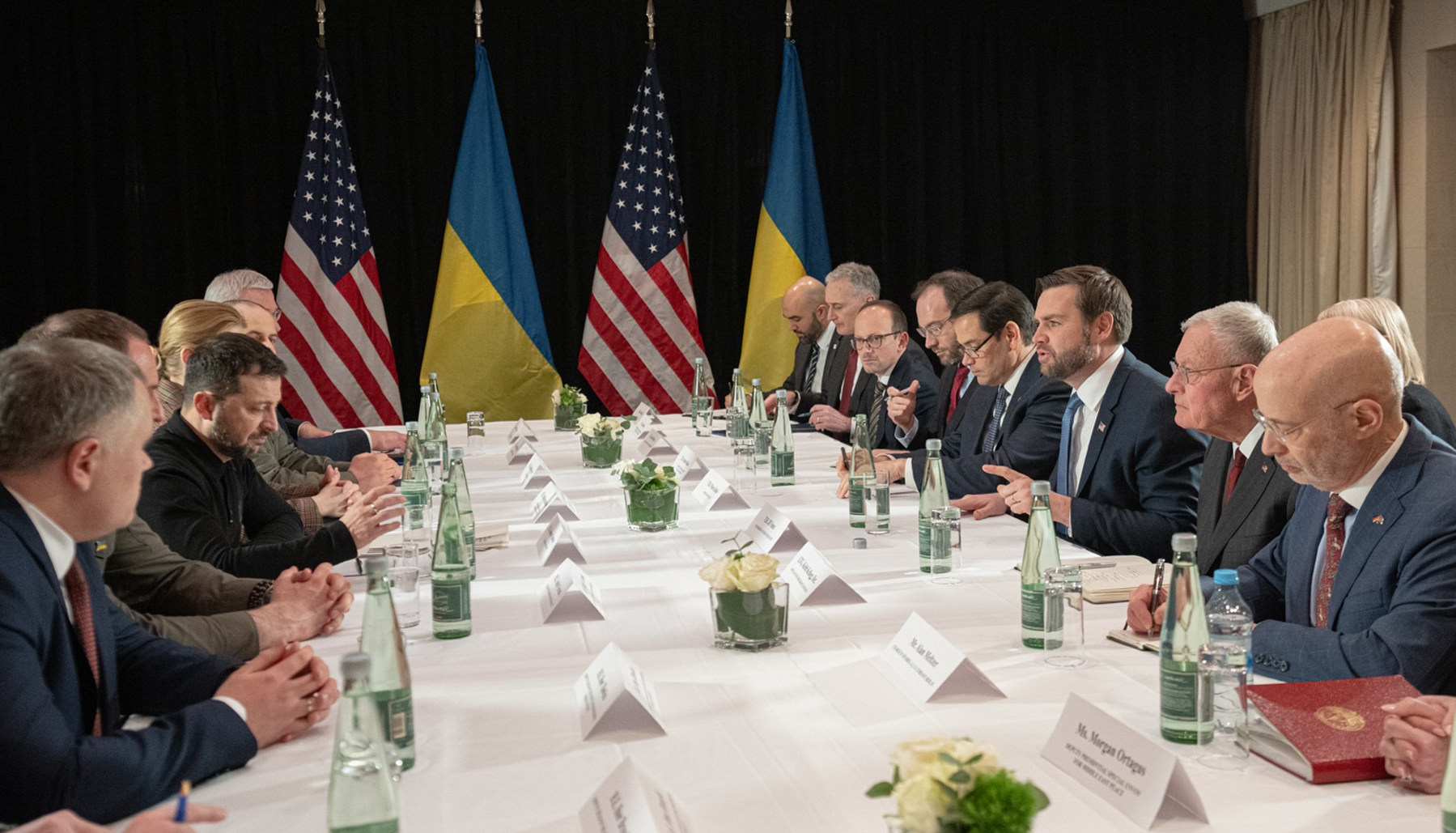
Ukrainian and US delegations meet at the 2025 Munich Security Conference

In February 2025, Trump described Zelenskyy as a dictator and stated that Ukraine had started the war.

According to Reuters, during talks in Riyadh on February 18, 2025, about ending the war in Ukraine, a "working dialogue" was established between the United States and Russia. Ukraine raised concerns that they were not invited to these discussions.

French President Emmanuel Macron met with Trump in the Oval Office on February 24, 2025, where they discussed the ongoing conflict in Ukraine. Macron's approach included a truce, then a peace settlement to ensure that Ukraine has long-term security guarantees for Ukraine. In contrast, President Trump called for a ceasefire with the United States negotiating directly with Russia.

In February 2025, the United States offered to take control of 50 percent of Ukraine's vital minerals in exchange for security guarantees to Ukraine against Russia. Zelenskyy has instructed his ministers not to sign a proposed agreement because the document was too focused on US interests.

In February 2025, Ukraine and its European allies made it clear that they were concerned that President Donald Trump had unilaterally opened negotiations with Putin and apparently made concessions to Russia.

On February 16, US Secretary of State Marco Rubio stated that Ukraine and Europe would be part of any "real negotiations" to end the war. President Donald Trump said on the same day that the Ukrainian President Zelenskyy "will be involved" in peace negotiations. On February 18, American and Russian delegations, headed by Marco Rubio and Russian Foreign Minister Sergey Lavrov, respectively, met in Riyadh, Saudi Arabia, in order to develop a framework for further peace negotiations on the war in Ukraine. Ukraine was not invited to the talks in Saudi Arabia. Rubio was accompanied by US National Security Advisor Mike Waltz and Special Envoy Steve Witkoff.

On February 24, the US voted against a UN General Assembly resolution condemning Russia's invasion of Ukraine. Alongside this resolution, the US introduced a separate resolution in the General Assembly which was worded in neutral terms. However, this resolution was significantly changed after several amendments, and Russia voted against it. The US later re-introduced that resolution in the Security Council, which ultimately approved it.

On February 27, Trump extended a series of sanctions against Russia over its invasion of Ukraine for one year.

A February 28, 2025, meeting between Trump and Zelenskyy in the White House failed to reach an agreement on the potential minerals deal that the two countries had considered. Trump told Zelenskyy that Zelenskyy was "gambling with World War III, and what you’re doing is very disrespectful to the country, this country that’s backed you far more than a lot of people say they should have" and the Ukrainian delegation was asked to leave the White House. According to several news outlets, this public spat was a catastrophic deterioration of relations between the countries, and a "beyond the worst-case scenario for Ukraine" and "Everything was ready for the signing of the mineral agreement, followed by a press conference. The tables were set, pens were on the tables, but everything fell apart." According to The Washington Post, on the day after the meeting, Trump was considering halting all military aid to Ukraine, citing sources from an administration official. Then, three days after the meeting, the U.S. suspended all military aid to Ukraine. A few days after that, the U.S. cut off its intelligence sharing with Ukraine, reportedly helping Russia advance during the Kursk campaign.

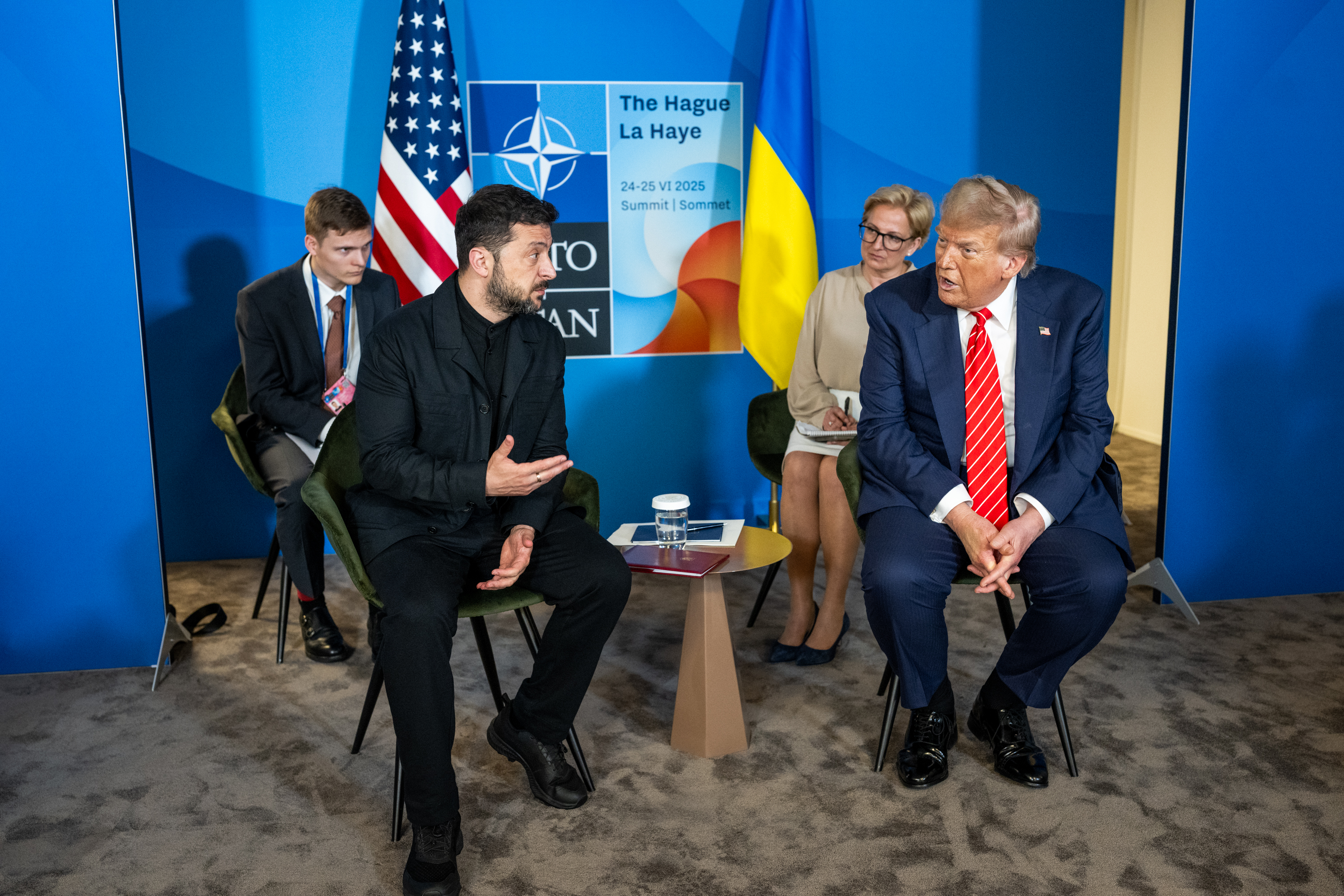
Presidents Trump and Zelenskyy at NATO summit in The Hague, June 25, 2025

On March 11, U.S. and Ukrainian officials met in Jeddah, Saudi Arabia, during which Ukraine accepted the U.S.'s proposal for a 30-day ceasefire. As part of the agreement, the U.S. resumed all military aid and intelligence sharing with Ukraine, while Rubio said that a peace agreement now relied on Russia's approval of the ceasefire, saying that "The ball is now in their court."

On April 24, Trump criticized Russia's missile and drone attack on Kyiv and Putin's determination to continue the war against Ukraine. In June 2025, a majority of U.S. senators supported secondary sanctions against Russia in order to increase pressure on Putin to stop the war in Ukraine. On June 25, Trump said he was considering sending more Patriot missile batteries to Ukraine to protect Kiev from Russian attacks.

On July 14, 2025, U.S. President Donald Trump announced a major policy reversal by agreeing to send Patriot air‑defense missile systems to Ukraine, financed and reimbursed by NATO and EU allies. He also threatened to impose 100% tariffs and secondary sanctions on countries purchasing Russian oil if Russia did not agree to a ceasefire within 50 days. On August 1, 2025, Trump condemned the Russian attack on Kyiv as "disgusting."

In September 2025, the Trump administration approved the delivery of up to $10 billion worth of weapons to Ukraine from US stockpiles, which would be paid for by NATO allies. Trump called Russia an "aggressor." On September 27, 2025, President Zelenskyy announced a $90 billion arms agreement with the United States.

In late October 2025, the seventh Ukraine Action Summit organized by American Coalition for Ukraine convened in Washington, D.C., bringing together over 700 U.S.-based delegates to advocate for continued American support of Ukraine’s defense and reconstruction.

==== Economic and mineral agreements ====
In April 2025, the bilateral relationship shifted towards a "resource-for-security" framework with the signing of the Ukraine-United States Mineral Resources Agreement. This accord established the United States-Ukraine Reconstruction Investment Fund (USURIF), managed by the U.S. International Development Finance Corporation (DFC), which effectively collateralized Ukraine's mineral wealth, specifically lithium, titanium, and rare earth elements, in exchange for continued American military support. In January 2026, the strategic Dobra lithium deposit was awarded to a U.S.-led consortium consisting of TechMet and The Rock Holdings. The awarding of the contract drew allegations of conflict of interest regarding administration allies.

As part of a broader package of import duties referred to as the “Liberation Day” tariffs, Ukraine was subjected to a 10% tariff. In a subsequent round of trade measures introduced at the end of February 2026, Ukraine experienced one of the largest increases in tariff exposure, with its effective average tariff rate rising to 20.3%. According to 2024 trade data, Ukraine exported $874 million worth of goods to the United States, while U.S. exports to Ukraine totaled $3.4 billion, nearly four times the value of Ukrainian exports to the U.S. At the same time, North Korea, Belarus, and Russia, which were involved in the ongoing invasion of Ukraine, were not subject to the new tariffs. White House spokeswoman Karoline Leavitt had claimed that existing sanctions already “prevent any meaningful trade” with those countries, although available trade data indicated that the remaining U.S. trade with Russia exceeded U.S. trade with some of the countries that were included in the tariff measures.

== Controversies ==
During the Ukrainian independence movement, on August 1, 1991, then-US President George H. W. Bush made a speech critical of the movement which James Carafano subsequently described as "what may have been the worst speech ever by an American chief executive".

On February 18, 2009, the Verkhovna Rada of Crimea sent a letter to the Cabinet of Ministers of Ukraine and the President of Ukraine in which it stated that it deemed it inexpedient to open a representative office of the United States in Crimea and it urged the Ukrainian leadership to give up this idea. The letter will also be sent to the Chairman of the UN General Assembly. The letter was passed in a 77 to 9 roll-call vote with one abstention.

In 2012 the United States Senate Committee on Foreign Relations passed Resolution 466, calling for the unconditional release of political prisoner Yulia Tymoshenko and implemented a visa ban against those responsible. The resolution condemned the administration of Ukrainian President Viktor Yanukovych (in office from 2010 to 2014) and asked NATO to suspend all cooperative agreements with Ukraine. In response, First Deputy General Prosecutor of Ukraine Renat Kuzmin wrote a letter to US President Barack Obama, complaining that his visa was revoked.

In December 2013, Victoria Nuland, the assistant secretary of state for European and Eurasian affairs, said in a speech to the US–Ukraine Foundation that the U.S. had invested over $5 billion on democratic skills and institutions, civic participation, and good governance in Ukraine since 1991, stating that these were preconditions for Ukraine to achieve its European aspirations. The Euromaidan protests resulted in the annexation of Crimea by the Russian Federation and later the election of the pro-EU president Petro Poroshenko in 2014. Poroshenko requested military aid from the United States. President Barack Obama was reluctant to arm a relatively corrupt military that was recently used against anti-democracy protestors, and saw the mistaken shoot-down of Malaysia Airlines Flight 17 by Russian-armed separatists as an example of the dangers of supplying arms to Ukraine. Though the US had sanctioned Russia and refused to recognize the annexation, after a year Obama declined to provide the requested lethal aid (such as FGM-148 Javelin anti-tank missiles and F-16 fighter jets). The Obama administration did supply $600 million of non-lethal military aid from 2014 to 2016, including vehicles, training, body armor, and night-vision goggles.

In 2017, President Donald Trump approved $47 million of Javelin anti-tank missile and missile launchers; these were not allowed to be deployed but kept in storage as a strategic deterrent against Russian invasion.

In 2018 the US House of Representatives passed a provision blocking any training of Azov Battalion of the Ukrainian National Guard by American forces, citing its neo-Nazi background. In previous years, between 2014 and 2017, the US House of Representatives passed amendments banning support of Azov, but due to pressure from the Pentagon, the amendments were quietly lifted.

On April 25, 2018, 57 members of the House of Representatives, led by Ro Khanna, released a condemnation of Holocaust distortion in Ukraine. They criticized Ukraine's 2015 memory laws glorifying Ukrainian Insurgent Army (UPA) and its leaders, such as Roman Shukhevych. The condemnation came in an open bipartisan letter to Deputy Secretary of State John Sullivan.

In summer 2019, Trump froze $400 million in military aid to Ukraine which had been approved by Congress, an aid package which was the subject of a scandal stemming from a phone call that Trump had with Ukrainian President Volodymyr Zelenskyy on July 25. On August 12, 2019, an anonymous whistleblower submitted a complaint to US Inspector General Michael Atkinson that stated that Trump had attempted to pressure Zelenskyy into launching an investigation on former US Vice President Joe Biden and his son Hunter Biden during the phone call. On September 24, 2019, the United States House of Representatives initiated an impeachment inquiry against Trump. Trump held a meeting with Zelenskyy in New York City on September 25, where they both stated that there was no pressuring during the July phone call and that nothing out of the ordinary had occurred. Trump was impeached by the House, but later acquitted in the Senate trial and continued as President until the end of his term.

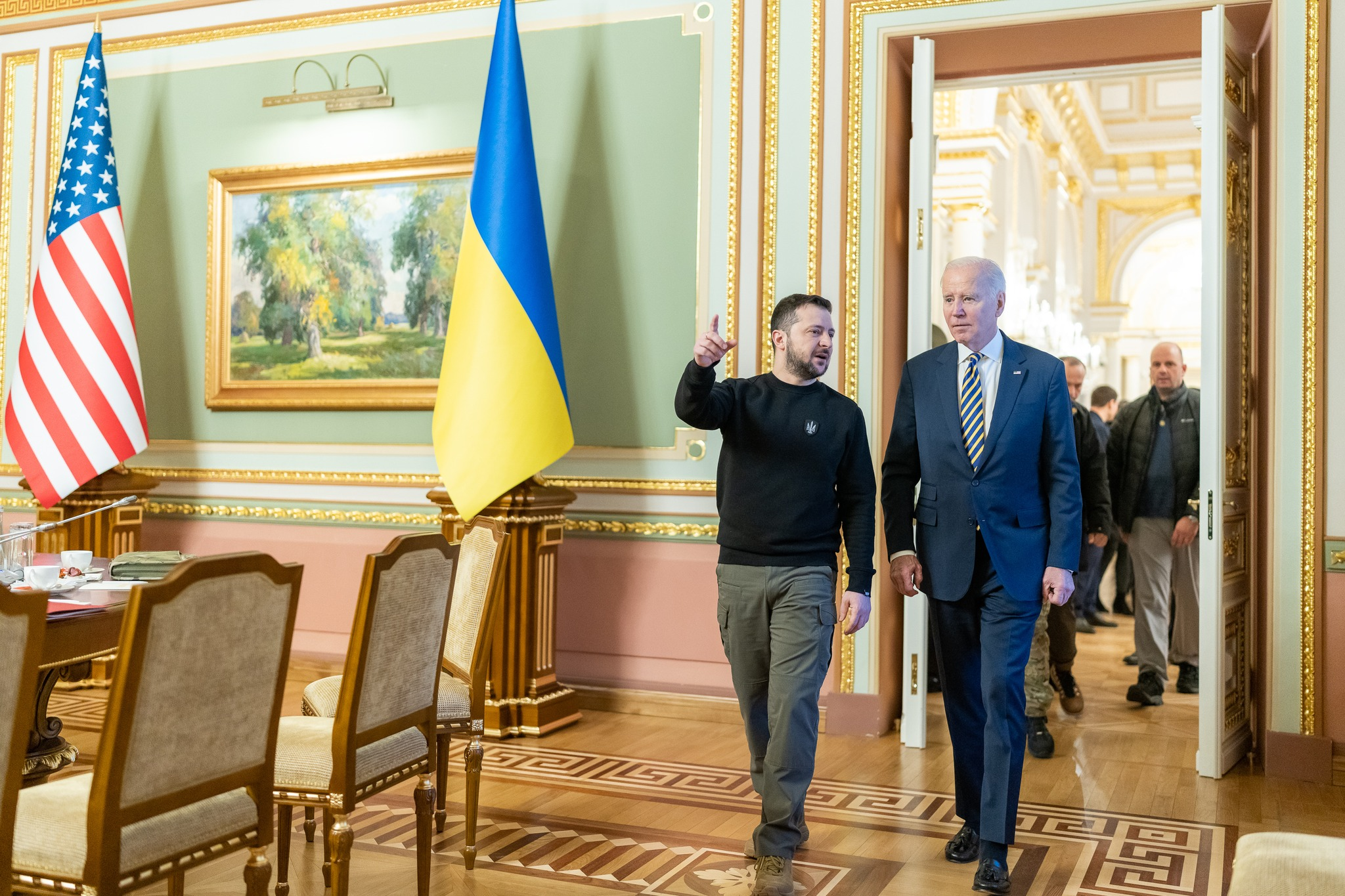
President Biden during his 2023 trip to Ukraine

From May 2019 to May 2022 the US did not have an ambassador to Ukraine.

The United States had pledged $2.175 billion in military aid to Ukraine, which included the Ground Launched Small Diameter Bomb (GLSDB), a new rocket doubling the country's strike range in its conflict with Russia. The aid package also funded other weapons and equipment, such as air defense firing units, counter-drone systems, and precision-guided munitions. Since the invasion by Russian forces, the United States had pledged over $29.3 billion in security assistance to Ukraine.

In early February 2023, 11 House Republicans led by Florida Rep. Matt Gaetz, introduced what they called the "Ukraine Fatigue Resolution" (H.Res. 113), calling on Biden to end military and financial aid to Ukraine while pressuring Ukraine and Russia to agree on a peace agreement.

In fall 2023, US public support for arming Ukraine in its war against Russia significantly dropped. Support for US weapon shipments to Ukraine dropped from 46% to 41% compared to a poll taken in May 2023. Both sides of the political spectrum saw a decline. Since the counteroffensive started in June 2023, Ukrainian forces have only retaken a series of small villages and settlements and are only in control of a small percentage of the territories occupied by Russian forces.

Between July and October 2025, American public opinion toward Ukraine improved markedly, particularly regarding support for military assistance. According to the Harvard CAPS/Harris Poll conducted in early July (July 6–8), 65% of registered voters supported the United States providing weapons to Ukraine and imposing sanctions on Russia if Moscow refused to participate in peace negotiations. By October 1–2, this figure had increased to 68%, demonstrating sustained and growing backing for a robust US response to Russian aggression. The most dramatic shift occurred among Republican voters, whose support for military aid to Ukraine surged from 30% in March 2025 to 51% by late July—a 21-percentage-point increase—according to the Chicago Council on Global Affairs survey conducted July 18–30. This bipartisan convergence extended to sanctions policy, with the October Harvard poll showing that 77% of voters overall—including 71% of Democrats and 86% of Republicans—supported additional economic sanctions against Russia to pressure Moscow to end the war. The October poll also revealed that 79% of voters believed Europe should stop purchasing Russian oil and instead buy from the United States, reflecting both strategic and economic considerations in American attitudes toward the conflict.

== Sister/twinning cities ==
- (Ukraine) Bohodukhiv, Kharkiv Oblast – (United States) Boyertown, Pennsylvania
- (Ukraine) Brovary, Kyiv Oblast – (United States) Rockford, Illinois
- (Ukraine) Chernivtsi – (United States) Salt Lake City, Utah
- (Ukraine) Chyhyryn, Cherkasy Oblast – (United States) Sebastopol, California
- (Ukraine) Dolyna, Ivano-Frankivsk Oblast – (United States) Prairie Village, Kansas
- (Ukraine) Donetsk – (United States) Pittsburgh, Pennsylvania
- (Ukraine) Drohobych, Lviv Oblast – (United States) Muscatine, Iowa and Buffalo, New York
- (Ukraine) Horlivka, Donetsk Oblast – (United States) Pensacola, Florida and Buffalo, New York
- (Ukraine) Ivano-Frankivsk – (United States) Arlington County, Virginia
- (Ukraine) Kalush, Ivano-Frankivsk Oblast – (United States) Grand Prairie, Texas
- (Ukraine) Kaniv, Cherkasy Oblast – (United States) Sonoma, California
- (Ukraine) Kharkiv – (United States) Cincinnati, Ohio
- (Ukraine) Khmelnyskyi – (United States) Modesto, California
- (Ukraine) Krasnodon, Luhansk Oblast – (United States) Birmingham, Alabama
- (Ukraine) Kyiv – (United States) Chicago, Illinois
- (Ukraine) Lviv – (United States) Corning, New York and Parma, Ohio
- (Ukraine) Odesa – (United States) Baltimore, Maryland
- (Ukraine) Poltava – (United States) Irondequoit, New York
- (Ukraine) Smila, Cherkasy Oblast – (United States) Newton, Iowa
- (Ukraine) Tysmenytsia, Ivano-Frankivsk Oblast – (United States) Bandera, Texas
- (Ukraine) Uzhhorod, Zakarpattia Oblast – (United States) Corvallis, Oregon
- (Ukraine) Vinnytsia – (United States) Birmingham, Alabama

=== Agreements and memorandums ===
- (Ukraine) Bakhmut, Donetsk Oblast – (United States) Omaha, Nebraska
- (Ukraine) Berdiansk, Zaporizhzhia Oblast – (United States) Lowell, Massachusetts
- (Ukraine) Berezhany, Ternopil Oblast – (United States) Wethersfield, Connecticut
- (Ukraine) Cherkasy – (United States) Des Moines, Iowa and Santa Rosa, California
- (Ukraine) Kalush, Ivano-Frankivsk Oblast – (United States) Little Rock, Arkansas
- (Ukraine) Kamianets-Podilskyi, Khmelnytskyi Oblast – (United States) Athens, Georgia
- (Ukraine) Kherson – (United States) Kent, Washington
- (Ukraine) Horishni Plavni, Poltava Oblast – (United States) Ithaca, New York
- (Ukraine) Konotop, Sumy Oblast – (United States) Helena, Montana and Skokie, Illinois
- (Ukraine) Korsun-Shevchenkivskyi, Cherkasy Oblast – (United States) Marshalltown, Iowa
- (Ukraine) Kremenchuk, Poltava Oblast – (United States) Providence, Rhode Island
- (Ukraine) Myrhorod, Poltava Oblast – (United States) Randolph, Vermont
- (Ukraine) Rubizhne, Luhansk Oblast – (United States) Louisville, Kentucky
- (Ukraine) Shpola, Cherkasy Oblast – (United States) Oskaloosa, Iowa
- (Ukraine) Simferopol, Crimea – (United States) Salem, Oregon
- (Ukraine) Slavutych, Kyiv Oblast – (United States) Richland, Washington
- (Ukraine) Svitlovodsk Kirovohrad Oblast – (United States) Springfield, Illinois
- (Ukraine) Ternopil – (United States) Yonkers, New York
- (Ukraine) Uman, Cherkasy Oblast – (United States) Davis, California
- (Ukraine) Yalta, Crimea – (United States) Santa Barbara, California

== Resident diplomatic missions ==
- Ukraine has an embassy in Washington, D.C. and consulates-general in Chicago, New York and San Francisco. The current Ukrainian Ambassador to the United States is Oksana Markarova.
- United States has an embassy in Kyiv. The current ambassador of the United States to Ukraine is Bridget A. Brink.
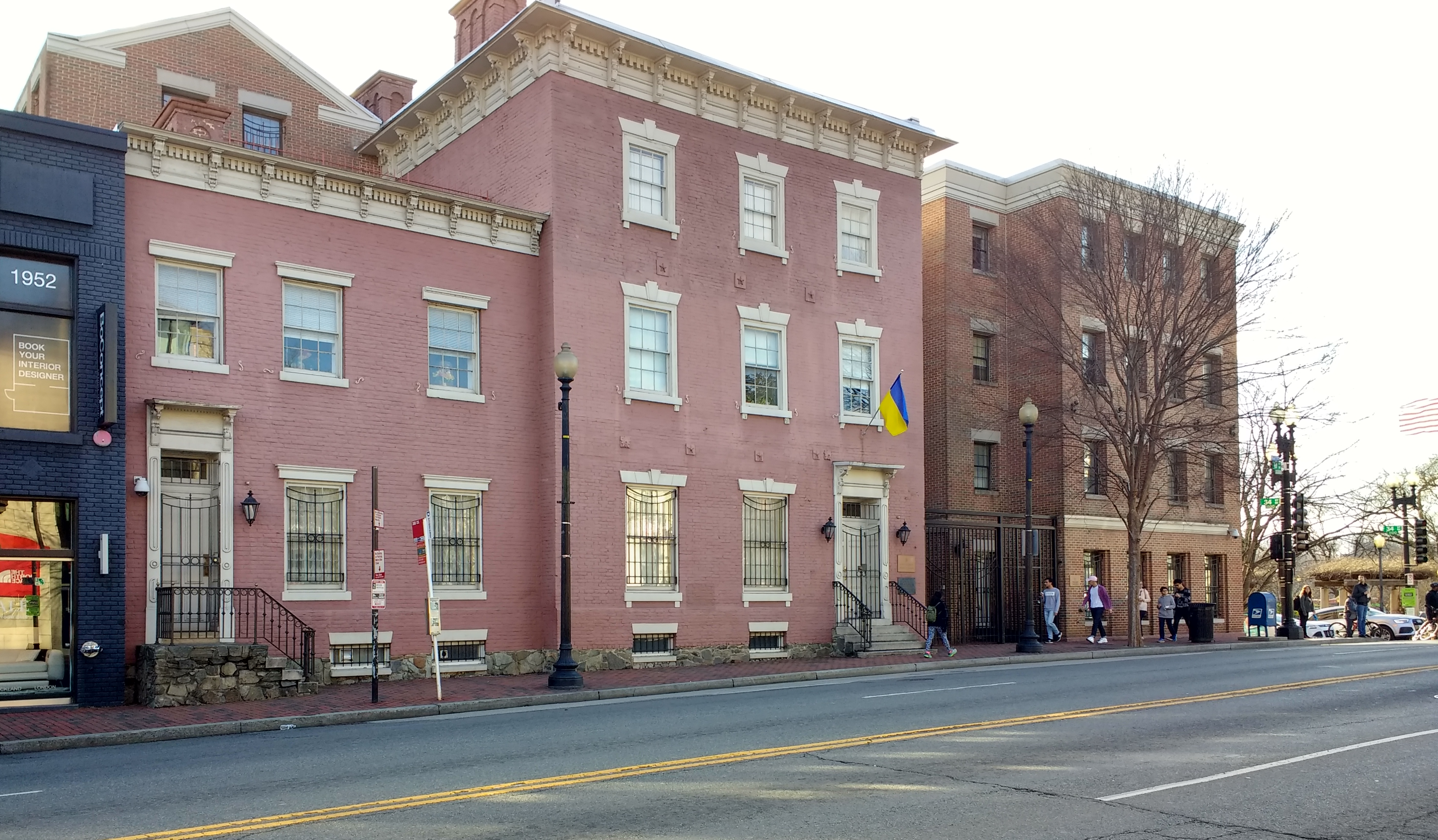
Embassy of Ukraine in Washington, D.C.

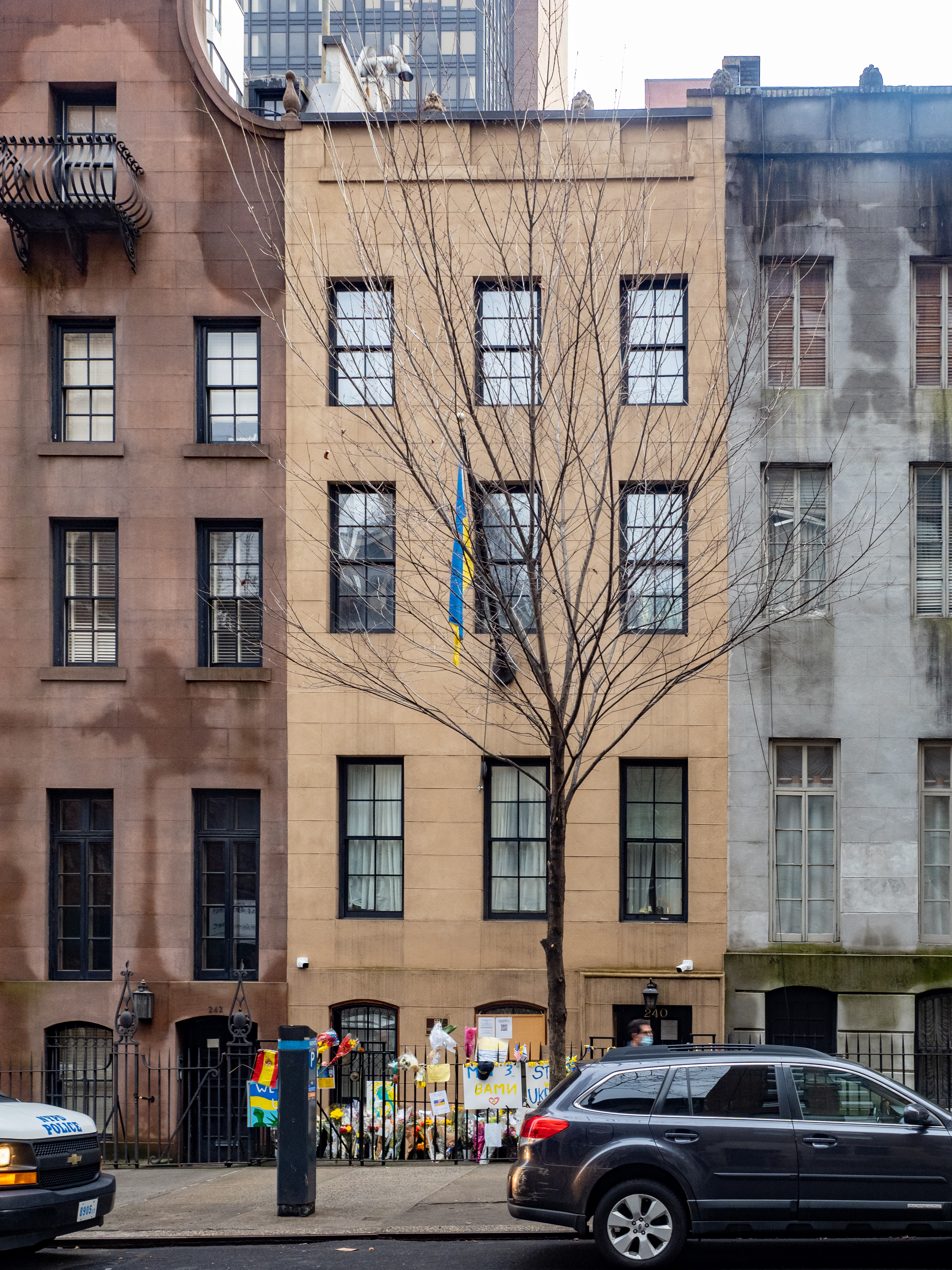
Consulate-General of Ukraine in New York

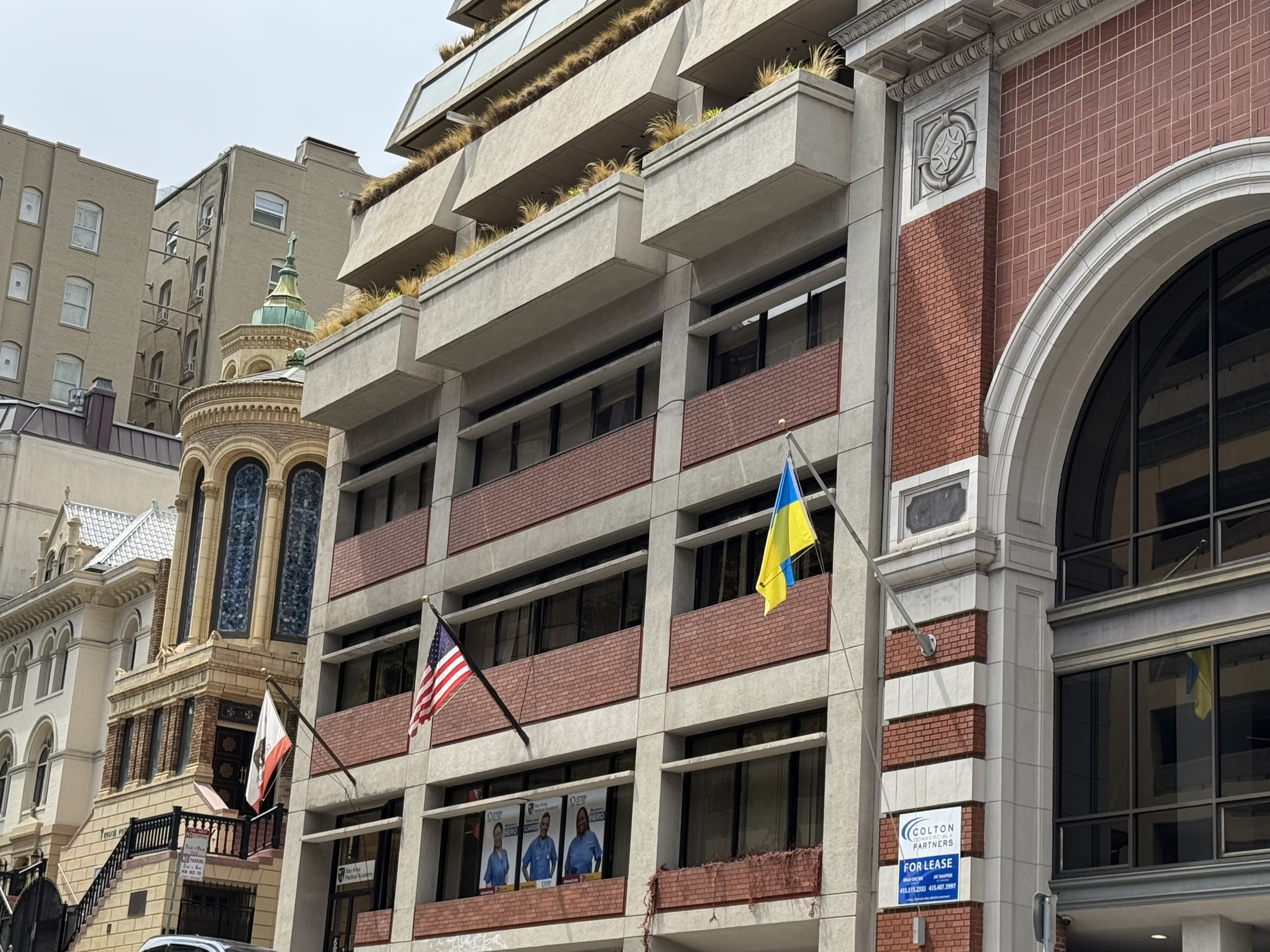
Consulate-General of Ukraine in San Francisco

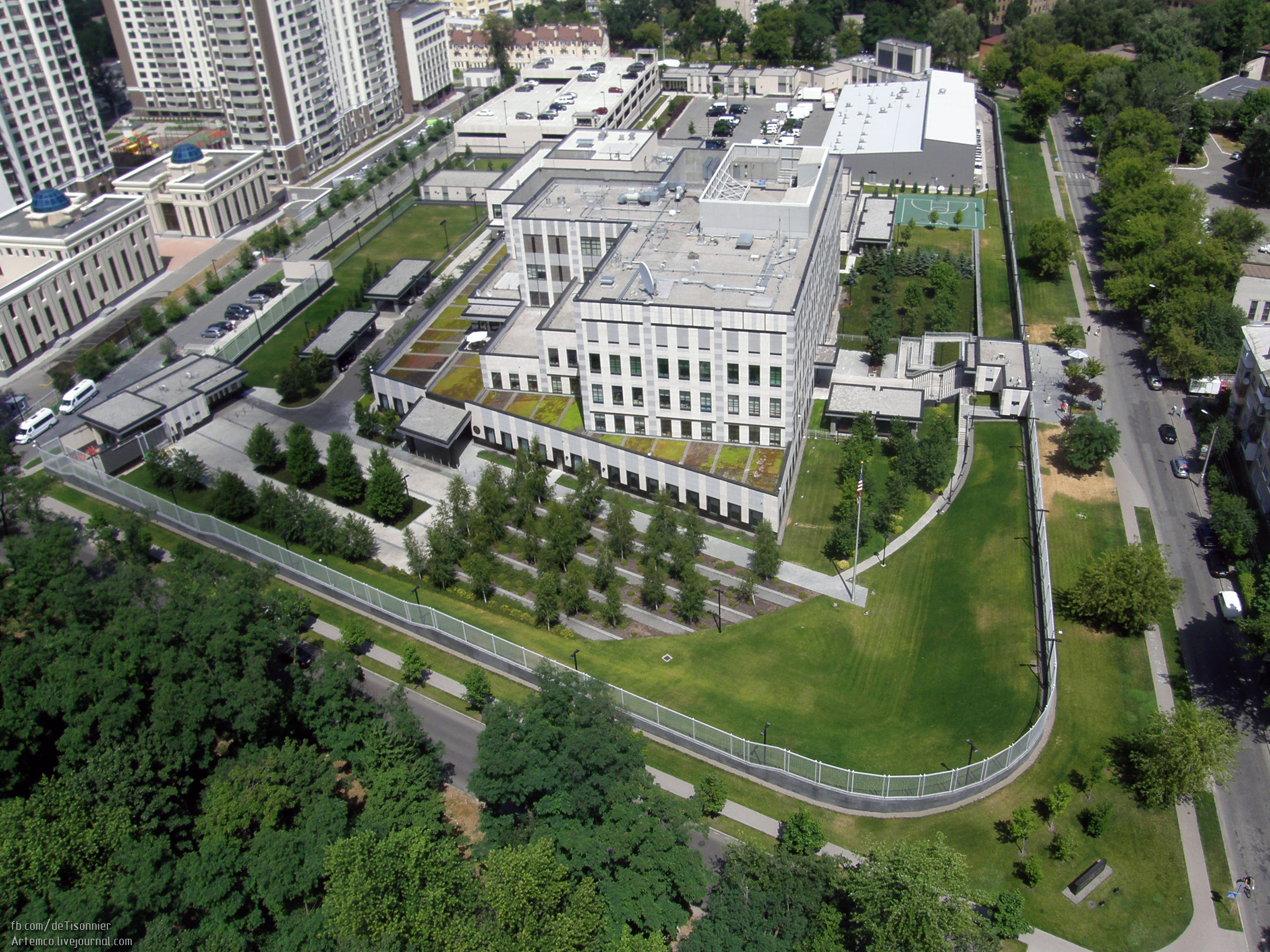
Embassy of the United States in Kyiv

== High-level mutual visits ==
Guest	Host	Place of visit	Date of visit
(Ukraine) President Leonid Kravchuk	(United States) President George H. W. Bush	Washington, D.C.	May 5–11, 1992
(United States) President Bill Clinton	(Ukraine) President Leonid Kravchuk	Kyiv	January 12, 1994
(United States) Vice President Al Gore	(Ukraine) President Leonid Kuchma	Kyiv	August 2, 1994
(Ukraine) President Leonid Kuchma	(United States) President Bill Clinton	Washington, D.C.	November 19–23, 1994
(United States) President Bill Clinton	(Ukraine) President Leonid Kuchma	Kyiv	May 11–12, 1995
(Ukraine) President Leonid Kuchma	(United States) President Bill Clinton	Washington, D.C.	February 20–22, 1996
(United States) Vice President Al Gore	(Ukraine) President Leonid Kuchma	Kyiv, Chernobyl	July 22–23, 1998
(United States) President Bill Clinton	(Ukraine) President Leonid Kuchma	Kyiv	June 5, 2000
(Ukraine) President Viktor Yushchenko	(United States) President George W. Bush	Washington, D.C., White House	April 4, 2005
(United States) President George W. Bush	(Ukraine) President Viktor Yushchenko	Kyiv	March 31 – April 1, 2008
(United States) Vice President Dick Cheney	(Ukraine) President Viktor Yushchenko	Kyiv	September 4–5, 2008
(Ukraine) President Viktor Yushchenko	(United States) President George W. Bush	Washington, D.C., White House	September 29, 2008
(United States) Vice President Joe Biden	(Ukraine) President Viktor Yushchenko	Kyiv	July 21, 2009
(Ukraine) Prime Minister Arseniy Yatsenyuk	(United States) President Barack Obama	Washington, D.C., White House	March 13–14, 2014
(United States) Vice President Joe Biden	(Ukraine) President Oleksandr Turchynov	Kyiv	April 22, 2014
(United States) Vice President Joe Biden	(Ukraine) President Petro Poroshenko	Kyiv	June 7, 2014
(Ukraine) President Petro Poroshenko	(United States) President Barack Obama	Washington, D.C., White House	September 17–18, 2014
(United States) Vice President Joe Biden	(Ukraine) President Petro Poroshenko	Kyiv	November 21, 2014
(United States) Vice President Joe Biden	(Ukraine) President Petro Poroshenko	Kyiv	December 7–8, 2015
(Ukraine) President Petro Poroshenko	(United States) President Barack Obama	Washington, D.C., White House	April 1, 2016
(United States) Vice President Joe Biden	(Ukraine) President Petro Poroshenko	Kyiv	January 16, 2017
(Ukraine) President Petro Poroshenko	(United States) President Donald Trump	Washington, D.C., White House	June 20, 2017
(Ukraine) President Volodymyr Zelenskyy	(United States) President Donald Trump	New York, United Nations General Assembly Hall	September 24–25, 2019
(Ukraine) President Volodymyr Zelenskyy	(United States) President Joe Biden	Washington, D.C., White House	August 31 – September 1, 2021
(Ukraine) Prime Minister Denys Shmyhal	(United States) President Joe Biden	Washington, D.C., White House	April 22, 2022
(Ukraine) President Volodymyr Zelenskyy	(United States) President Joe Biden	Washington, D.C., White House	December 21, 2022
(United States) President Joe Biden	(Ukraine) President Volodymyr Zelenskyy	Kyiv	February 20, 2023
(Ukraine) President Volodymyr Zelenskyy	(United States) President Joe Biden	Washington, D.C., White House	September 22, 2023
(Ukraine) President Volodymyr Zelenskyy	(United States) President Joe Biden	Washington, D.C., White House	December 11–12, 2023
(Ukraine) President Volodymyr Zelenskyy	(United States) President Joe Biden	Washington, D.C., Walter E. Washington Convention Center	July 9–11, 2024
(Ukraine) President Volodymyr Zelenskyy	(United States) President Joe Biden	Washington, D.C., White House	September 26, 2024
(Ukraine) President Volodymyr Zelenskyy	(United States) President Donald Trump	Washington, D.C., White House	February 28, 2025
(Ukraine) President Volodymyr Zelenskyy	(United States) President Donald Trump	Washington, D.C., White House	October 17, 2025
(Ukraine) President Volodymyr Zelenskyy	(United States) President Donald Trump	Miami, Palm Beach, Mar-a-Lago	December 28–29, 2025

== See also ==
- Foreign relations of Ukraine
- Foreign relations of United States
- Ukraine–NATO relations
- NATO–Russia relations
- Russia–Ukraine relations
- Russia–United States relations
- United States and the Russian invasion of Ukraine
- Ukraine–Commonwealth of Independent States relations
- Taras Shevchenko Memorial
- Ukrainian Americans
