= Roman Popadiuk =

American diplomat

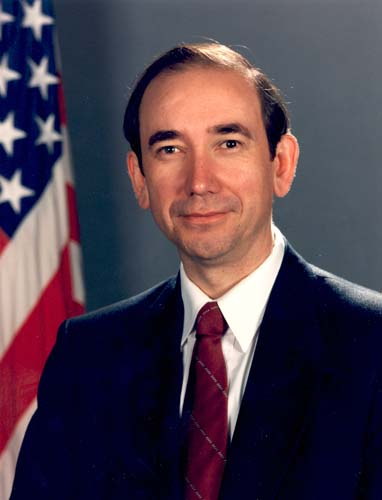

1st United States Ambassador to Ukraine
- In office June 4, 1992 – July 30, 1993
- President: George H. W. Bush; Bill Clinton
- Preceded by: Jon Gundersen (as chargé d'affaires)
- Succeeded by: William Green Miller

Personal details
- Born: May 30, 1950 (age 75) Austria
- Spouse: Judith A. Popadiuk
- Education: Hunter College (B.A.); CUNY Graduate Center (Ph.D.)
- Profession: Diplomat

Roman Popadiuk (Note: Ukrainian: Роман Попадюк, romanized: Roman Popadiuk) (born May 30, 1950) is an American diplomat of Ukrainian descent. Popadiuk served as the first United States Ambassador to Ukraine under George H. W. Bush, from 1992 to 1993. From 2015 until 2017, he was a principal at Morgan, Lewis & Bockius LLP's subsidiary Morgan Lewis Consulting, and prior to 2015 he was the principal at Bingham Consulting. Since late 2018 Popadiuk has been the president of the Diplomacy Center Foundation which oversees the development of the National Museum of American Diplomacy.

== Background ==
Roman Popadiuk was born on May 30, 1950, in a DP camp in Austria to Ukrainian parents brought to Germany as forced laborers. He received a B.A. from Hunter College in 1973, and a PhD from CUNY Graduate Center in 1981. He was an adjunct lecturer in Political Science at Brooklyn College in New York City.

He joined the United States Foreign Service in 1981. From 1982 to 1984, he worked as a diplomat in Mexico City. From 1984 to 1986, he worked in the Department of State and in the National Security Council.

From 1986 to 1989, he served as Assistant Press Secretary, then Special Assistant to the President and Deputy Press Secretary for Foreign Affairs and Deputy Assistant under Ronald Reagan. He served as Deputy Assistant to the President and Deputy Press Secretary for Foreign Affairs under George H. W. Bush, from 1989 to 1992.

He served as the first United States Ambassador to Ukraine under George H.W. Bush from 1992 to 1993. From 1993 to 1995, he taught at the Foreign Service Institute. From 1995 to 1998, he served as the International Affairs Adviser on the staff of the Office of the Commandant at the Industrial College of the Armed Forces at Fort McNair in Washington, D.C. For 13 years from 1999 to 2012, he served as the executive director of the George Bush Presidential Library Foundation at Texas A&M University in College Station, Texas.

From 2012 until 2015, he was the principal at Bingham Consulting, and from 2015 until 2017 he was a principal at Morgan, Lewis & Bockius LLP's subsidiary Morgan Lewis Consulting,

In 2012, Popadiuk became a member of the U.S.-Ukraine Energy Task Force of the Ukraine 2020 Policy Dialogue, a forum co-sponsored by the U.S. Embassy in Ukraine and the U.S.-Ukraine Foundation in Washington, D.C., aimed at strengthening U.S.-Ukraine relations and Ukraine's integration into Europe.

On 24 October 2018, Roman Popadiuk replaced Thomas E. McNamara as the President of the Diplomacy Center Foundation (DCF), formerly the Foreign Affairs Museum Council, the private partner in a public private partnership with the United States Department of State to design, build and complete a museum on American diplomacy, National Museum of American Diplomacy (formerly United States Diplomacy Center). He has served on the DCF Board for five years prior to taking over the role of the President in 2018.

== Awards and Affiliations ==
He has received a number of awards, including the United States Department of State Meritorious and Superior Honor Awards. Other awards include the Annual Achievement Award from the Ukrainian Institute of America, the Shevchenko Freedom Award presented by the Ukrainian Congress Committee of America, and the Hunter College Hall of Fame.

Popadiuk is a member of the Council on Foreign Relations and sits on the Board of Advisers of the Scowcroft Institute of International Affairs at The Bush School of Government and Public Service at Texas A&M University. he is on the Board of Advisers of the Confucius Institute at Texas A&M University and the Washington, D.C.-based U.S.-Ukraine Business Council.

== Personal life ==
He is married to Judith Ann Fedkiw, and they have four children, Gregory, Matthew, Catherine and Mary.

== Bibliography ==
Popadiuk has published two books and numerous articles in, among others, The Ukrainian Quarterly, The Foreign Service Journal, Mediterranean Quarterly, and Presidential Studies Quarterly.

- American-Ukrainian Nuclear Relations (monograph, 1996)
- The President’s Foreign Intelligence Advisory Board: Learning Lessons from Its Past to Shape Its Future (monograph, 2008, co-author)
- The Leadership of George Bush: An Insider’s View of the 41st President (2009)
- Privileged and Confidential: The Secret History of the President's Intelligence Advisory Board (2012, co-author)

== See also ==
- Embassy of the United States, Kyiv

== Notes ==
Diplomatic posts
Preceded by Jon Gundersen chargé d'affaires	United States Ambassador to Ukraine; 1992–1993	Succeeded by William Green Miller
