= List of ambassadors of the United States to Ukraine =

Ambassador of the United States to Ukraine
- Посол Сполучених Штатів в Україні
- Seal of the United States Department of State

- Flag of a United States ambassador

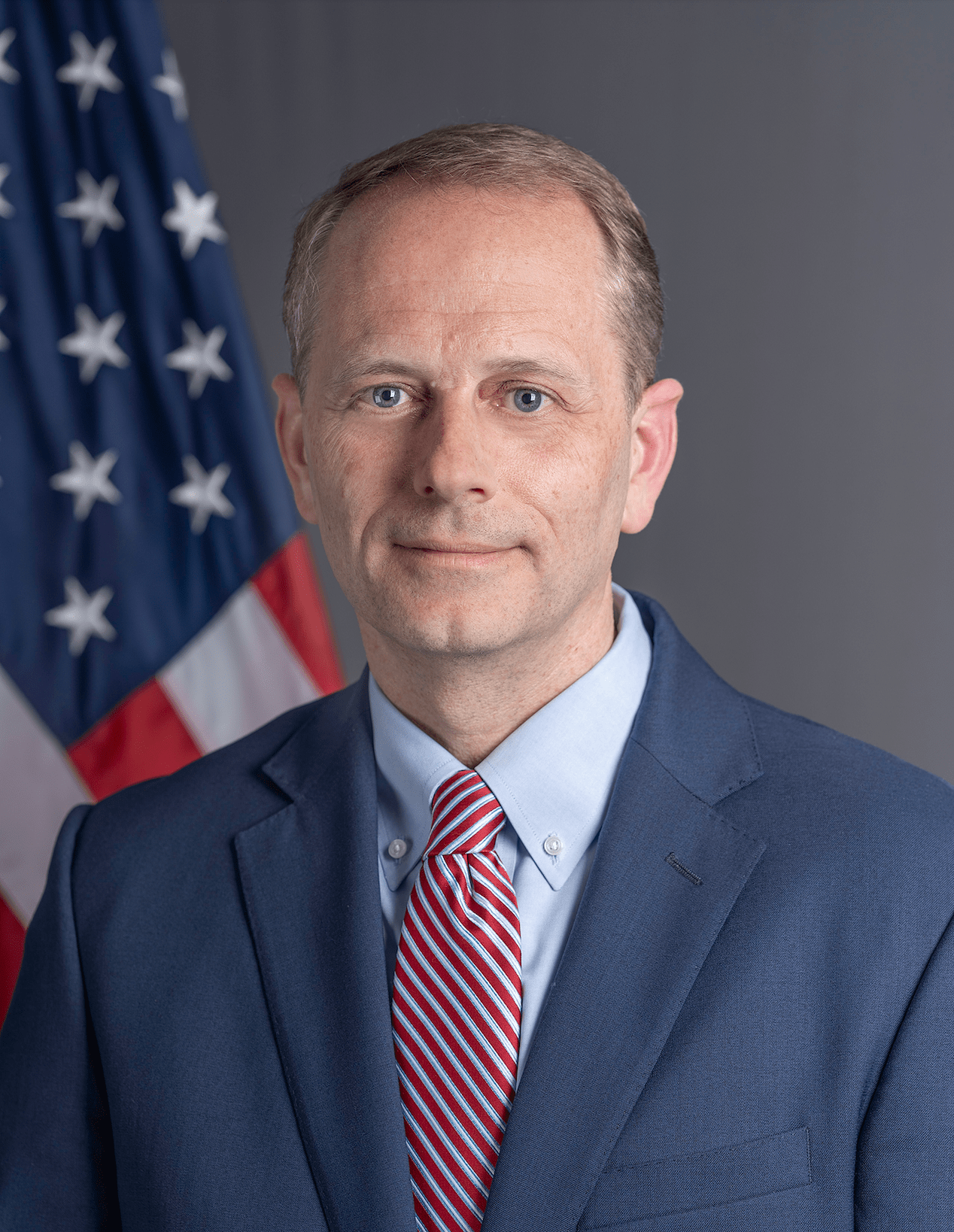
- Incumbent; Paul R. Houston; Chargé d'affaires since August 23, 2026
- Nominator: The president of the United States
- Inaugural holder: Roman Popadiuk as Ambassador Extraordinary and Plenipotentiary
- Formation: May 11, 1992
- Website: U.S. Embassy – Kyiv

The ambassador of the United States to Ukraine is the highest-ranking diplomatic position of the United States in Ukraine. The U.S. ambassadors are nominated by the president to serve as the country's diplomatic representatives to Ukraine. Under Article II, Section 2 of the U.S. Constitution, their appointment must be confirmed by the United States Senate; while an ambassador may be appointed during a recess, they can serve only until the end of the next session of Congress, unless subsequently confirmed. Ambassadors are under the jurisdiction of the Department of State and answer directly to the secretary of state; however, ambassadors serve "at the pleasure of the President", meaning they can be dismissed at any time. Appointments change regularly for various reasons, such as reassignment or retirement. An ambassador may be a career Foreign Service Officer (career diplomat – CD) or a political appointee (PA). In most cases, career foreign service officers serve a tour of approximately three years per ambassadorship, whereas political appointees customarily tender their resignations upon the inauguration of a new American president. The U.S. ambassador to Ukraine resides in Kyiv, the country's capital and location of the U.S. Embassy.

The U.S. recognized Ukraine's independence on 25 December 1991 and the following year, opened an embassy and appointed the first American ambassador to the country on 21 January 1992. Upon the breakup of the USSR, the parliament of Ukraine declared the nation's independence on August 24, 1991. On December 1, 1991, the people of Ukraine voted to approve the declaration by a wide margin. The United States recognized Ukraine on December 26, 1991, and the U.S. embassy in Kyiv was established on January 23, 1992, with Jon Gundersen as Chargé d'Affaires ad interim. The first ambassador was commissioned in May 1992. In January 2022, the embassy requested the evacuation of non-essential personnel and their families as the 2021–2022 Russo-Ukrainian crisis escalated.

== Chiefs of mission ==
No.	Image	Name	Type	Title	Appointed	Presented credentials	Terminated mission
–		Jon Gundersen	Career FSO	Chargé d'Affaires ad interim	January 23, 1992		May 11, 1992
1		Roman Popadiuk	Career FSO	Ambassador Extraordinary and Plenipotentiary	May 11, 1992	June 4, 1992	July 30, 1993
2		William Green Miller	Political appointee	Ambassador Extraordinary and Plenipotentiary	September 16, 1993	October 21, 1993	January 6, 1998
3		Steven Pifer	Career FSO	Ambassador Extraordinary and Plenipotentiary	November 10, 1997	January 20, 1998	October 9, 2000
4		Carlos Pascual	Career FSO	Ambassador Extraordinary and Plenipotentiary	September 15, 2000	October 22, 2000	May 1, 2003
5		John E. Herbst	Career FSO	Ambassador Extraordinary and Plenipotentiary	July 1, 2003	September 20, 2003	May 26, 2006
6		William B. Taylor Jr.	Political appointee	Ambassador Extraordinary and Plenipotentiary	May 30, 2006	June 21, 2006	May 23, 2009
7		John F. Tefft	Career FSO	Ambassador Extraordinary and Plenipotentiary	November 20, 2009	December 7, 2009	July 9, 2013
8		Geoffrey R. Pyatt	Career FSO	Ambassador Extraordinary and Plenipotentiary	July 30, 2013	August 15, 2013	August 18, 2016
9		Marie Yovanovitch	Career FSO	Ambassador Extraordinary and Plenipotentiary	May 18, 2016	August 29, 2016	May 20, 2019
–		Joseph Pennington	Career FSO	Chargé d'Affaires ad interim	May 20, 2019		May 28, 2019
–		Kristina Kvien	Career FSO	Chargé d'Affaires ad interim	May 28, 2019		June 18, 2019
–		William B. Taylor Jr.	Political appointee	Chargé d'Affaires ad interim	June 18, 2019		January 1, 2020
–		Kristina Kvien	Career FSO	Chargé d'Affaires ad interim	January 1, 2020		May 29, 2022
10		Bridget Brink	Career FSO	Ambassador Extraordinary and Plenipotentiary	May 18, 2022	May 30, 2022	April 21, 2025
–		John Ginkel	Career FSO	Chargé d'Affaires ad interim	April 21, 2025		May 5, 2025
–		Julie Davis	Career FSO	Chargé d'Affaires ad interim	May 5, 2025		June 27, 2026
–		Daniel Bischof	Career FSO	Chargé d'Affaires ad interim	June 27, 2026		July 8, 2026
–		Sandra Oudkirk	Career FSO	Chargé d'Affaires ad interim	July 8, 2026		August 23, 2026
–		Paul R. Houston	Career FSO	Chargé d'Affaires ad interim	August 23, 2026		Present

== See also ==
- Ukraine–United States relations
- Ambassadors of the United States
- Embassy of the United States, Kyiv
- Embassy of Ukraine, Washington, D.C.
- Ambassadors of Ukraine to the United States of America
