= Joseph S. Pennington =

American diplomat

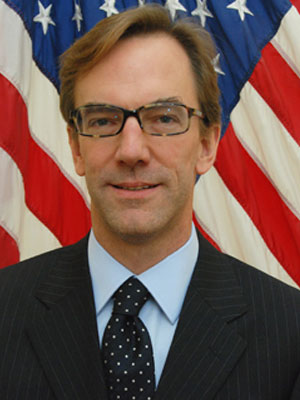

United States Ambassador to Ukraine Acting
- In office May 21, 2019 – May 28, 2019
- President: Donald Trump
- Preceded by: Marie Yovanovitch (as Ambassador)
- Succeeded by: Kristina Kvien (acting)

Personal details
- Education: University of Maryland, Baltimore County (BA); Columbia University (MA)
- Occupation: Diplomat

Joseph S. Pennington is a former American diplomat who is a Career Member of the Senior Foreign Service with the rank of Minister-Counselor and is the Senior Advisor to the Ambassador on U.S. Assistance to Ukraine. When Ambassador Marie Yovanovitch was recalled in the spring of 2019, and incoming Deputy Chief of Mission Kristina Kvien not to arrive in Kyiv on May 28, Pennington continued to serve as chargé d'affaires and acting deputy chief through the transition period. It has been reported that Pennington was one of two Embassy officials who were briefed on a meeting in which Ukrainian President Volodymyr Zelenskyy said he felt pressure from the Trump Administration to investigate Hunter Biden.

== Biography ==
Pennington is a graduate of the University of Maryland, Baltimore County (UMBC), where he earned a B.A. in political science, and from Columbia University where he earned an M.A. in political science.

== Career highlights ==
- Deputy Assistant Secretary of State for Iraq in the Bureau of Near Eastern Affairs (2015–18)
- Director of the Office of Iraq Affairs (2015)
- Principal Officer at the U.S. Consulate General in Erbil, in the Iraqi Kurdistan Region (2013–15) for which Pennington received the Ryan C. Crocker Award for Outstanding Leadership in Expeditionary Diplomacy.
- Deputy Chief of Mission at the U.S. Embassy in Prague, Czech Republic (2010–13) in Yerevan, Armenia (2007–10).
- headed the U.S. Embassy Branch Office in Mostar, Bosnia-Herzegovina (2000–01).
- His work as political-economic officer at the U.S. Consulate in Adana, Turkey (1995–98) was recognized with the Assistant Secretary's Award for Exceptional Achievement in the Field of Human Rights and Democracy

Diplomatic posts
Preceded by Marie Yovanovitch as Ambassador	United States Ambassador to Ukraine; Acting; 2019	Succeeded by Kristina Kvien; Acting
