= Jon Gundersen =

United States diplomat

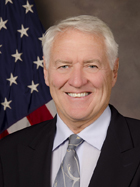

United States Chargé d'affaires to Ukraine
- In office January 23, 1992 – June 4, 1992
- President: George H. W. Bush
- Preceded by: Diplomatic relations established
- Succeeded by: Roman Popadiuk

Personal details
- Born: 1945 (age 80–81)

Jon Gundersen (born 1945) is an American diplomat. Gundersen served as the Chargé d'Affaires ad interim United States to Ukraine, Estonia, Iceland and Norway.

== Biography ==
He served as an officer in the United States Army in Vietnam. He was a member of the first US counter-terrorism "Sky Marshall" operations in the early 1970s and has worked as a Merchant Sailor. Gundersen served in numerous assignments both in the US and overseas, concentrating on the Nordic Region, arms control and political-military issues. He served as Chargé d'Affaires and Deputy Chief of Mission in a number of nations, including Ukraine (1992), Estonia (1994-1995), Iceland and Norway. He opened the first U. S. mission in Kyiv in 1992 and has been assigned to Russia, the United Nations, and as Political Advisor to the Special Operations Command and Senior Advisor for Iraqi Reconstruction. He is the Chair of Advanced Nordic Area Studies at the Foreign Service Institute. He also teaches at the Joint Special Operations University and works for the State Department declassifying sensitive documents. In the 2020 presidential election, Gundersen supported the Republican Voters Against Trump campaign for Democratic candidate Joe Biden.

Diplomatic posts
Preceded by Diplomatic relations established	Chargé d’Affaires to Ukraine; 1992	Succeeded by Roman Popadiuk
