= Kristina Kvien =

American diplomat

Her Excellency Kristina Kvien
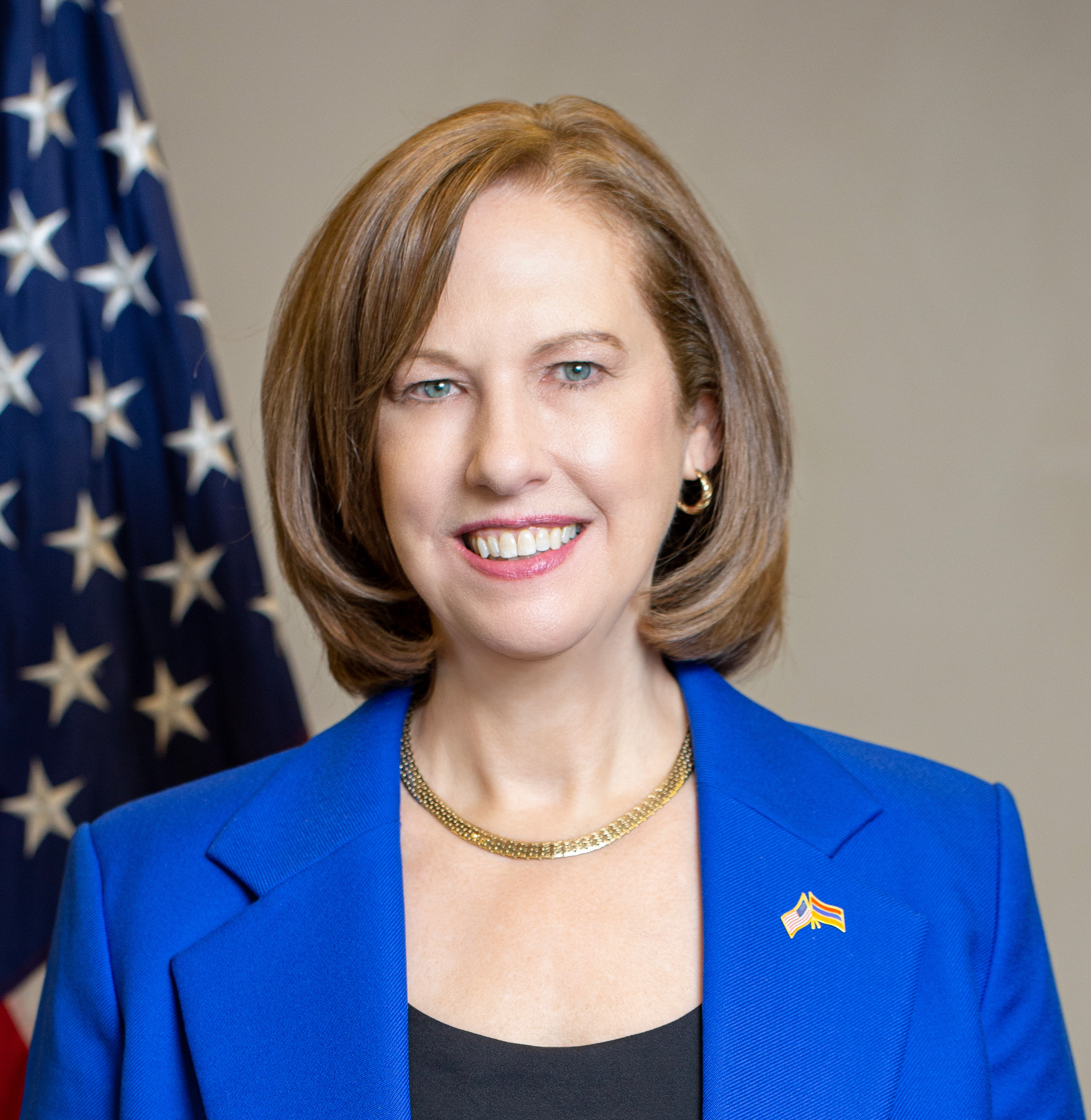

10th United States Ambassador to Armenia
- In office February 21, 2023 – January 16, 2026
- President: Joe Biden; Donald Trump
- Preceded by: Lynne M. Tracy

United States Chargé d’Affaires to Ukraine
- In office January 1, 2020 – May 29, 2022
- President: Donald Trump; Joe Biden
- Preceded by: William B. Taylor Jr. (acting)
- Succeeded by: Bridget A. Brink
- In office May 28, 2019 – June 18, 2019
- President: Donald Trump
- Preceded by: Joseph Pennington (acting)
- Succeeded by: William B. Taylor Jr. (acting)

Personal details
- Education: Occidental College (BA); United States Army War College (MS)

Kristina A. Kvien is an American diplomat who had served as United States Ambassador to Armenia. She previously served as United States Chargé d’Affaires to Ukraine from May to June 2019 and from January 2020 to May 2022. From June 2019 to January 2020, she was Deputy Chief of Mission at the Embassy of the United States in Kyiv.

== Early life and education ==
Originally from Orange County, California, she earned a bachelor's degree from Occidental College. After graduating from college, she worked as a market researcher for the Los Angeles Times and then pursued graduate studies at Stockholm University in Sweden. She later earned a master's degree in strategic studies from the United States Army War College.

== Foreign Service career ==
Kvien joined the Foreign Service in 1992, and her first assignment was as a consular officer in Paris. She later served as an Economics Officer at the Embassy of the United States, Manila. Subsequently, she served at the Bureau of European and Eurasian Affairs in Washington, D.C., focusing on European Union and OECD issues. She was then assigned as a desk officer for Slovenia.

From 2001 to 2005, she served at the United States Mission to the European Union in Brussels as an Economics Officer, and then was transferred to the Embassy of the United States, Moscow, working on environment and energy issues. Kvien then became Director for EU Affairs, EU Economies and Caspian Energy for Ukraine and Belarus at the United States National Security Council.

Kvien then accepted a post in London overseeing US-UK economic relations, covering finance and banking issues, civil aviation, terrorist financing, labor, and energy policy. Kvien has also served in Thailand as Acting Deputy Chief of Mission at the Embassy of the United States, Bangkok.

Before being posted to Ukraine, Kvien served at the Embassy of the United States, Paris from 2016 to April 2019 as Acting Deputy Chief of Mission and Minister Counselor for Economic Affairs.

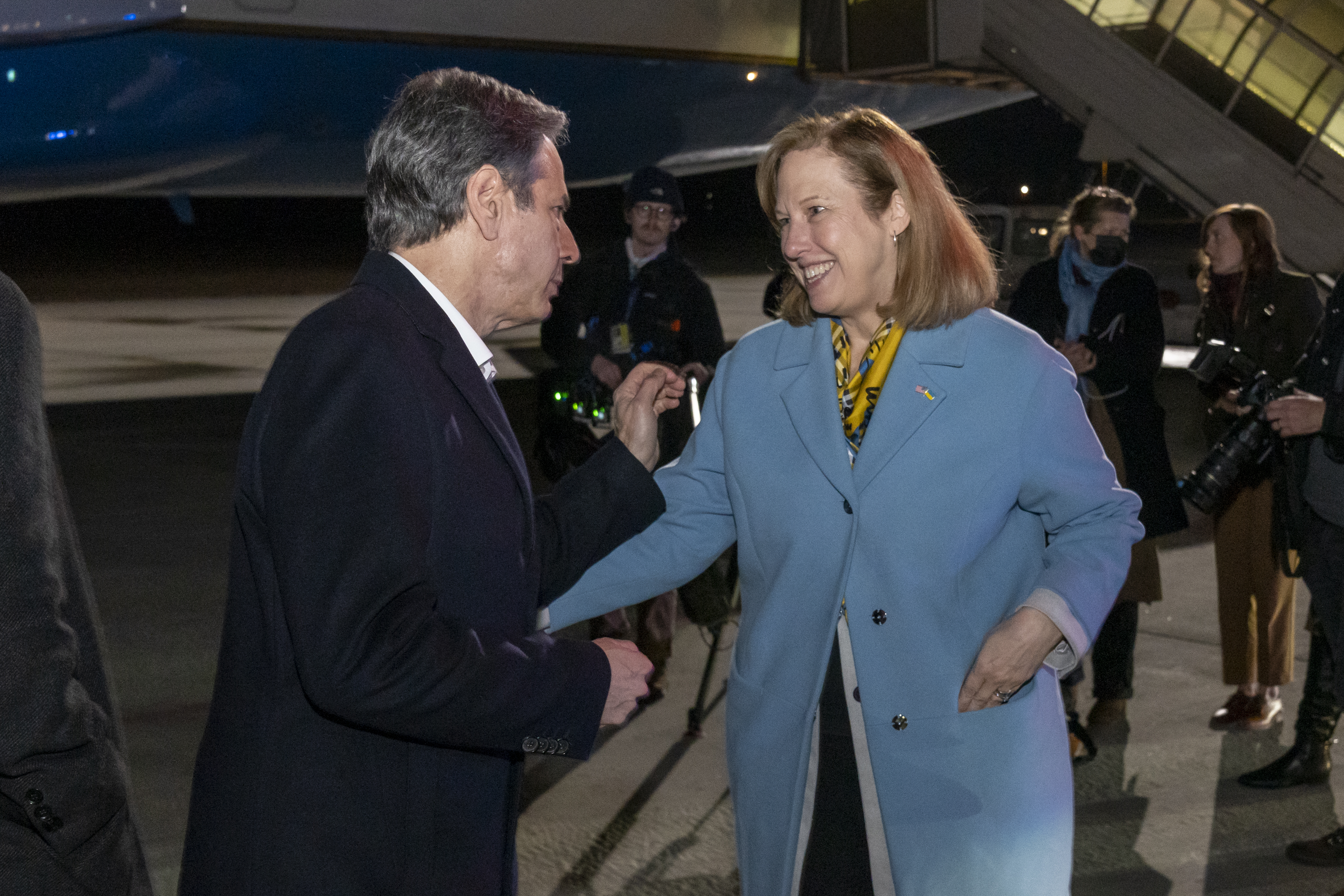
Kvien with U.S. Secretary of State Antony Blinken in Rzeszow, Poland, on March 5, 2022

At the Embassy of the United States, Kyiv, Kvien assumed the post of Chargé d'Affaires from Joseph S. Pennington on May 28, 2019. Upon the appointment of former ambassador William B. Taylor Jr. as the new Chargé d'Affaires, Kvien relinquished that post on June 18, 2019. She then served as Deputy Chief of Mission in Ukraine from June to January 2020.

After the departure of Taylor in January 2020, Kvien again became acting ambassador.

=== United States ambassador to Armenia ===
On June 22, 2022, President Joe Biden nominated Kvien to serve as the United States ambassador to Armenia. On November 30, 2022, hearings on her nomination were held before the Senate Foreign Relations Committee. On December 7, 2022, her nomination was favorably reported out of committee. On December 13, 2022, her nomination was confirmed by the Senate by voice vote. She was sworn in by Under Secretary Uzra Zeya on January 26, 2023, and presented her credentials to President Vahagn Khachaturyan on February 21, 2023.

In December 2025, U.S. President Donald Trump recalled Ambassador Kvien back to Washington D.C. She departed post January 2026, after two years and eleven months as U.S. ambassador to Armenia.

== Awards and recognitions ==
Kvien is a recipient of multiple State Department performance awards.

== Personal life ==
Kvien speaks Russian and French.

Diplomatic posts
Preceded by Joseph Pennington; Acting	United States Ambassador to Ukraine; Acting; 2019	Succeeded by William B. Taylor Jr. Acting
Preceded by William B. Taylor Jr. Acting	United States Ambassador to Ukraine; Acting; 2020–2022	Succeeded by Bridget A. Brink
Preceded by Lynne M. Tracy	United States Ambassador to Armenia; 2023–present	Incumbent
