= William Green Miller =

American diplomat (1931–2019)

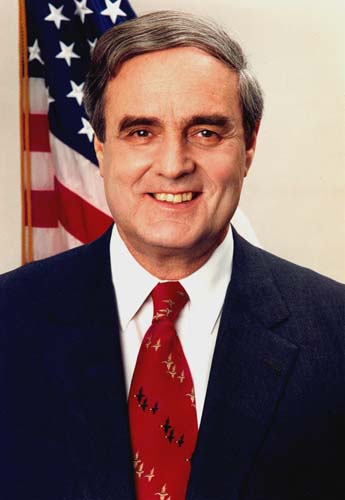

2nd United States Ambassador to Ukraine
- In office October 21, 1993 – January 6, 1998
- President: Bill Clinton
- Preceded by: Roman Popadiuk
- Succeeded by: Steven Pifer

Personal details
- Born: August 15, 1931 New York City, New York, U.S.
- Died: September 23, 2019 (aged 88) Hollin Hills, Virginia, U.S.
- Spouse: Suzanne
- Education: Williams College; University of Oxford; Harvard University
- Profession: Diplomat

William Green Miller (August 15, 1931 - September 23, 2019) was an American scholar and diplomat who served as the United States Ambassador to Ukraine under Bill Clinton, from 1993 to 1998.

== Education ==
He went to college and graduate school at Williams College in 1953, the University of Oxford and Harvard University.

== Diplomat ==
In 1959, he joined the United States Foreign Service. From 1959 to 1964, he served as a diplomat in Iran. He then worked as a staffer for Secretary of State Dean Rusk, and in the Senate for John Sherman Cooper.

From 1981 to 1983, he served as Associate Dean and Professor of International Politics at the Fletcher School of Law and Diplomacy at Tufts University. In 1986, he was a Research Fellow at the Harvard Institute of Politics and became President of the American Committee on United States-Soviet Relations. From 1993 to 1998, he served as the United States Ambassador to Ukraine.

He was a Senior Policy Scholar at the Woodrow Wilson International Center for Scholars in Washington, D.C. He was also a member of the Council on Foreign Relations, the International Institute of Strategic Studies, and the Middle East Institute. Further, Miller served as the co-Chairman of the Kyiv Mohyla Foundation of America and a Director of The Andrei Sakharov Foundation. He additionally consulted for the John D. and Catherine T. MacArthur Foundation.

Miller died on September 23, 2019, in his home in Virginia.

Diplomatic posts
Preceded by Roman Popadiuk	United States Ambassador to Ukraine; 1993–1998	Succeeded by Steven Pifer
