= Steven Pifer =

American diplomat

Steven Karl Pifer
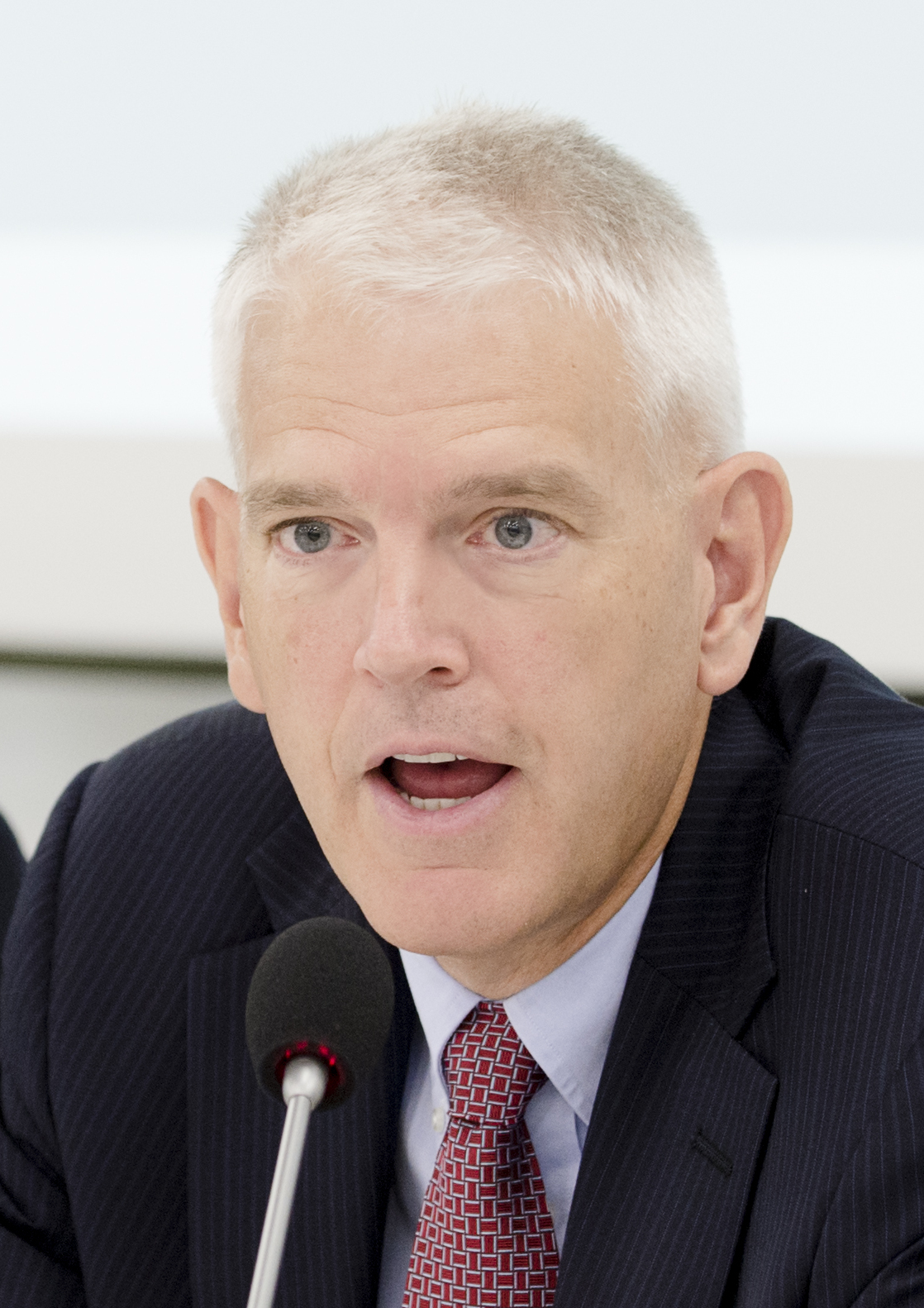

3rd United States Ambassador to Ukraine
- In office January 20, 1998 – October 9, 2000
- President: Bill Clinton
- Preceded by: William Green Miller
- Succeeded by: Carlos Pascual

Personal details
- Born: 1953 (age 72–73)
- Party: Democratic
- Education: Stanford University (B.A.)

Steven Karl Pifer (born 1953) is a senior fellow at the Brookings Institution's Center on the United States and Europe as well as the director of Brookings' Arms Control Initiative. He was formerly senior adviser with the Center for Strategic & International Studies in Washington, D.C., and the third United States Ambassador to Ukraine from 1998 to 2000.

== Education ==
Pifer graduated from Stanford University with a B.A. in economics in 1976.

== Career ==
He served at the United States Embassies in Warsaw, London and Moscow, and as advisor on the U.S. delegation to the negotiations on intermediate-range nuclear forces in Geneva.

From 1978 to 2004 he was a foreign service officer with the US Dept. of State. From 1996 to 1997, he served special assistant to the president and senior director for Russia, Ukraine and Eurasia on the National Security Council. From 1998 to 2000, he served as the United States Ambassador to Ukraine. From 2001 to 2004, he served as deputy assistant secretary of state in the Bureau of European and Eurasian Affairs, with responsibility for Russia and Ukraine.

He was a visiting scholar at the Stanford Institute for International Studies in 2000–2001."

== Publications ==
Pifer is author of "The Opportunity: Next Steps in Reducing Nuclear Arms" with Michael E. O'Hanlon.

Diplomatic posts
Preceded by William Green Miller	United States Ambassador to Ukraine; 1998–2000	Succeeded by Carlos Pascual
