= National Museum of American Diplomacy =

Public museum in Washington, D.C.

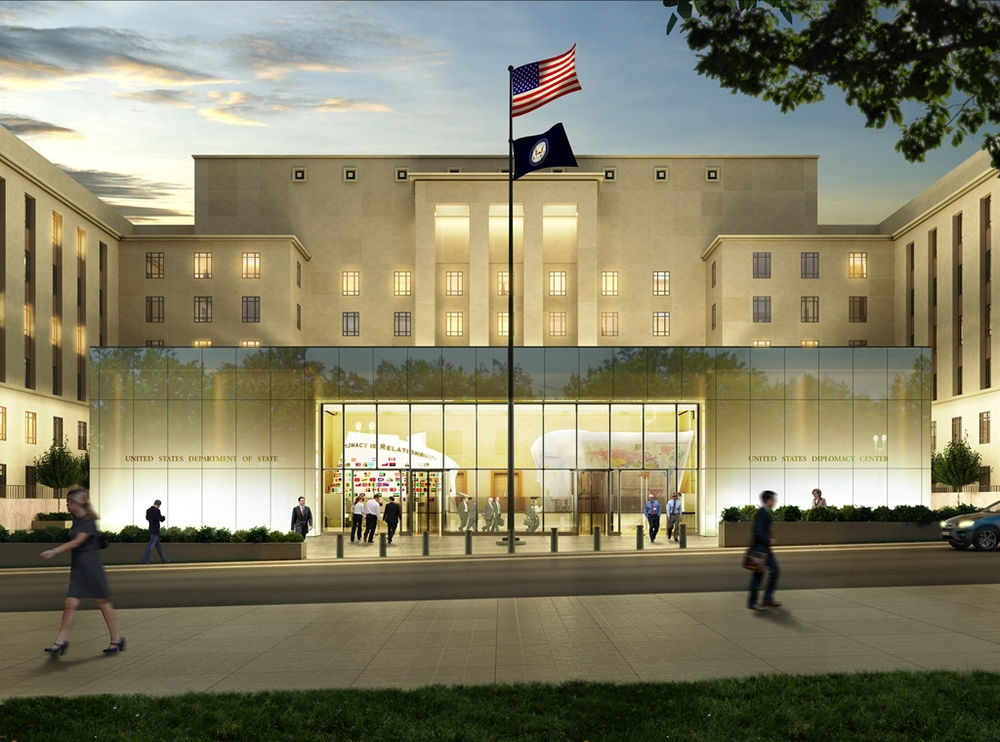

- Location within Washington, D.C.
- Established: 2000; 26 years ago
- Location: Harry S Truman Building Washington, D.C.
- Coordinates: 38.8944°N 77.0484°W
- Director: Todd Kinser (Acting)
- Public transit access: Foggy Bottom
- Website: diplomacy.state.gov
National Museum of American Diplomacy
Agency overview
- Parent agency: Bureau of Public Affairs

The National Museum of American Diplomacy (NMAD) is the first museum in the United States dedicated to telling the stories of American diplomacy.

The museum is currently under development and is raising funds for its completion through a public-private partnership with the Diplomacy Center Foundation. NMAD is located at the 21st Street entrance to the Harry S Truman Building in Washington, D.C. where the U.S. Department of State is headquartered. The National Museum of American Diplomacy falls under the jurisdiction of the Bureau of Public Affairs. It was called the United States Diplomacy Center before being renamed in November 2019.

== History ==
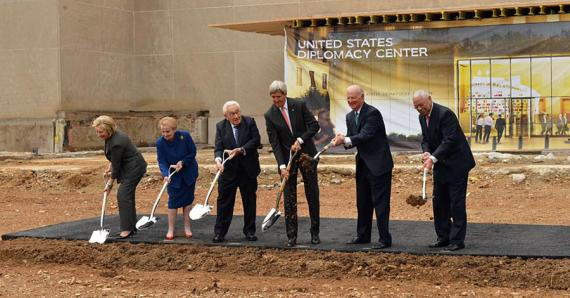
Six Secretaries of State (Left to right: Hillary Clinton, Madeleine Albright, Henry Kissinger, then-current secretary John Kerry, James Baker, and Colin Powell), at the National Museum of American Diplomacy's groundbreaking ceremony in September 2014

In 1999, Ambassador Stephen Low and Senator Charles Mathias founded the Foreign Affairs Museum Council (FAMC), a nonprofit organization, to help build the first museum dedicated to American diplomacy. In 2000, then-U.S. secretary of state Madeleine Albright agreed for the museum to be located at the Department of State. Then-assistant secretary of state for administration Patrick F. Kennedy claimed 20,000 square feet of space for the museum. In September 2013, the Foreign Affairs Museum Council formally changed its name to the Diplomacy Center Foundation. The Diplomacy Center Foundation represents the private sector in a public-private partnership with the U.S. Department of State in creating and maintaining NMAD.

The National Capital Planning Commission approved the design in 2011. Construction of the museum officially began in late 2014. Secretary of state John Kerry as well as five former secretaries of state (Henry Kissinger, James Baker, Madeleine Albright, Colin Powell, and Hillary Clinton) attended the groundbreaking ceremony on September 3, 2014.

== Pavilion ==
Architect Hany Hassan of Beyer Blinder Belle designed the museum's 20,000 square-foot pavilion which extends out for visitors entering on 21st Street. Construction for the pavilion was completed in 2017. The design intends to complement the original 1941 wing of the Harry S Truman Building, the headquarters of the U.S. Department of State.

The opening hall will feature interactive exhibits to explore American diplomacy today and provide an orientation for the public about U.S. diplomats, what they do, where they are posted around the world, U.S. global bilateral and multilateral relationships, and how this all relates to the everyday lives of citizens. In November 2019, Diplomacy Is Our Mission, a preview exhibit designed in collaboration with Smithsonian Exhibits, opened to the public. Through the themes of security, prosperity, democracy, and development, Diplomacy Is Our Mission explores historic and contemporary stories that "highlight the efforts of U.S. diplomats and how they work with international partners to create a more stable world."

== Education ==
The National Museum of American Diplomacy aims to engage students and educators through the Museum's education programs and curricula. At the core of the center's education outreach is the diplomacy simulation program, an immersive exercise in which participants engage on a critical global issue. Working in small teams, participants step into the world of diplomacy by representing the interests of a specific stakeholder group (e.g., foreign ministries, the U.S. Department of State, NGOs, international organizations). Under set time constraints, the groups are challenged to negotiate a solution to an international crisis. Using the information provided in the simulation materials, they develop, defend and modify their group's policy positions in real time.

The museum also trains educators to run simulations using free material on its website, including a teacher's guide with links to instructional videos, scenarios with background information, and short video links featuring topic experts. Educators in turn can teach thousands of students about the art and challenges of diplomacy.

== Installations ==
In November 2019, "Diplomacy Is Our Mission", a preview exhibit designed in collaboration with Smithsonian Institution Exhibits (SIE), opened to the public. The museum will display Madeleine Albright's pin collection, how Shirley Temple Black was the ambassador to Ghana and then Czechoslovakia, and then the first woman to serve as U.S. chief of protocol, and also items from the TV show Madam Secretary.

== Partnerships ==
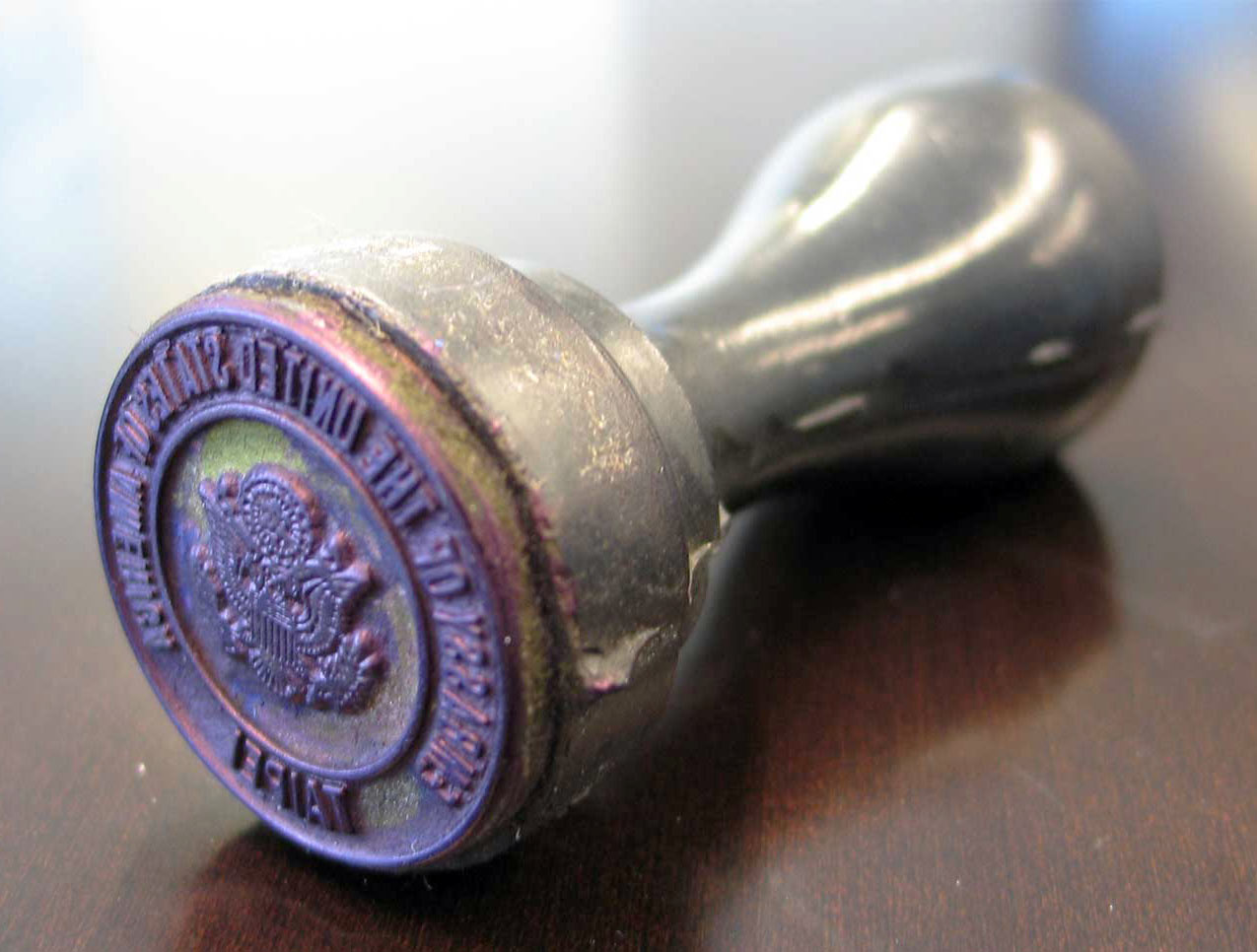
The stamp from the U.S. Embassy in Taipei before the embassy closed down

The National Museum of American Diplomacy commemorates milestones in American diplomacy, using discussions, film screenings, and ceremonies. The programs feature Foreign and Civil Service Officers, foreign policy experts, historians, and citizen diplomats. These programs take place in the Pavilion's Founding Ambassadors Concourse. NMAD hosts panel discussions on diplomacy for the general public and hosts events in partnership with other Bureaus at the State Department, outside U.S. government agencies, organizations, and embassies. NMAD also hosts outside events, such as exhibit testing and a diplomacy-centered hackathon.
