= Paul R. Houston =

American federal law enforcement officer (born 1979)

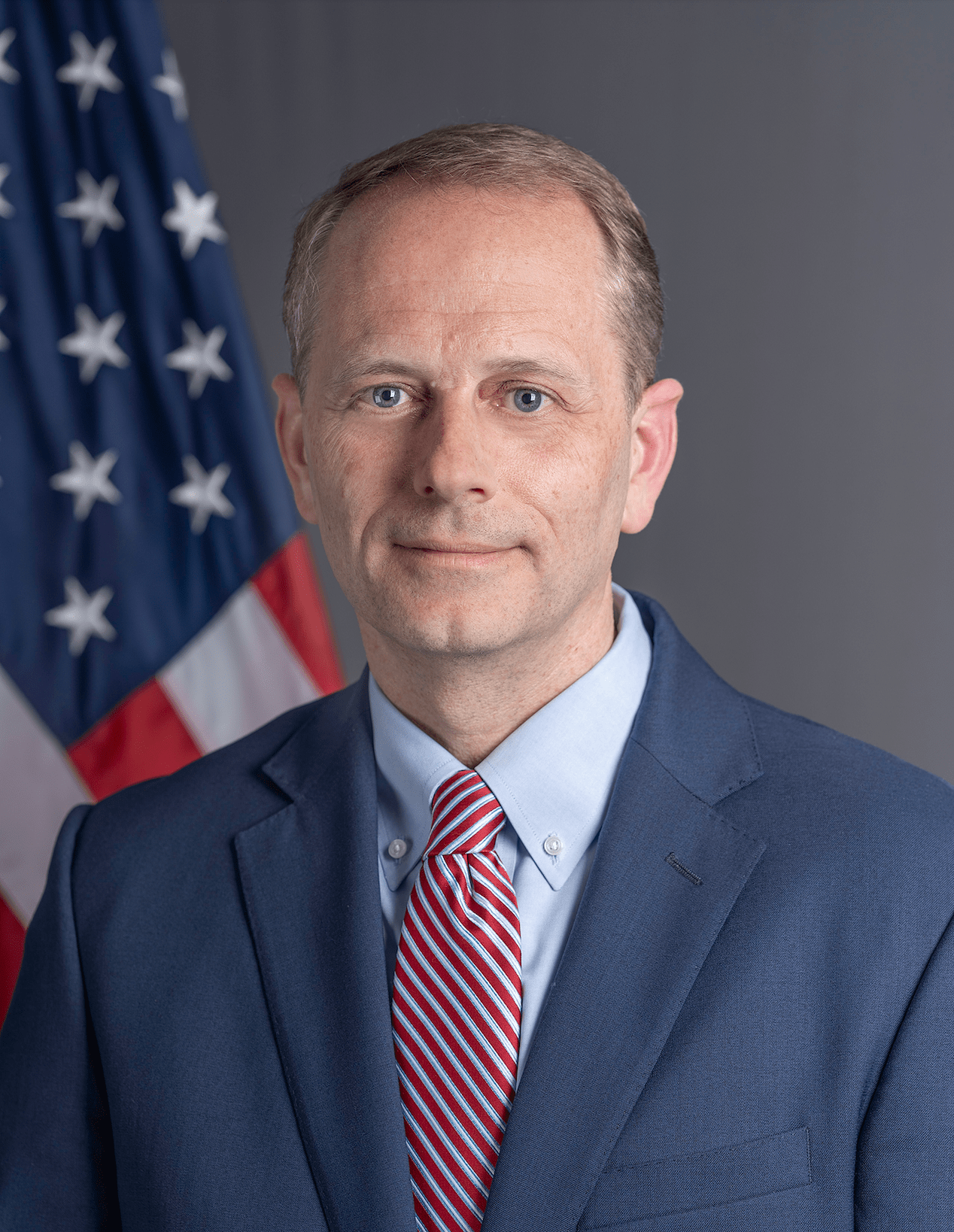

Senior Bureau Official, Bureau of Diplomatic Security
- In office June 2, 2025 – October 14, 2025
- President: Donald Trump
- Preceded by: Carlos Matus (Acting)
- Succeeded by: Todd Wilcox (Assistant Secretary)

Personal details
- Born: Paul R. Houston
- Education: University of Iowa (BA); University of Kentucky (MS)
- Profession: Special agent
- Paul R. Houston's voice Houston offering a reward up to $10 million dollar reward for information leading to the arrest or location for the Al-Shabaab terrorists Recorded January 5, 2023

Paul R. Houston (born 1979) is an American diplomat and federal law enforcement officer who is currently serving as chargé d'affaires in Ukraine. He previously served as a special advisor to the assistant secretary of state for diplomatic security within the U.S. State Department's Bureau of Diplomatic Security and chargé d'affaires in Niger.

== Early life and education ==
Paul Houston earned his BA in political science from the University of Iowa. He holds an master's degree in national security policy and international economics from the University of Kentucky's School of Diplomacy and International Commerce.

== Career ==
Paul Houston served in the United States Marines and as a legislative assistant to Rep. Jim Leach prior to joining the Department of State as a special agent and diplomat in the Diplomatic Security Service. During his career with the DSS, Houston has served as director of the DSS's Office of Special Investigations and as deputy director of the Department of State's Command Center. While a member of the burea's senior advisory team, he led and participated in numerous projects in both the public and private sectors, involving conducting overseas criminal and administrative investigations, threat dissemination and crisis command and control.

== See also ==
- Diplomatic Security Service
- Bureau of Diplomatic Security
- Rewards For Justice Program
- United States State Department
