= List of ambassadors of Slovakia to the United States =

Coordinates: 38°56′43.9″N 77°4′5.2″W

Ambassador of Slovakia to the United States Embassy of Slovakia, Washington, D.C.
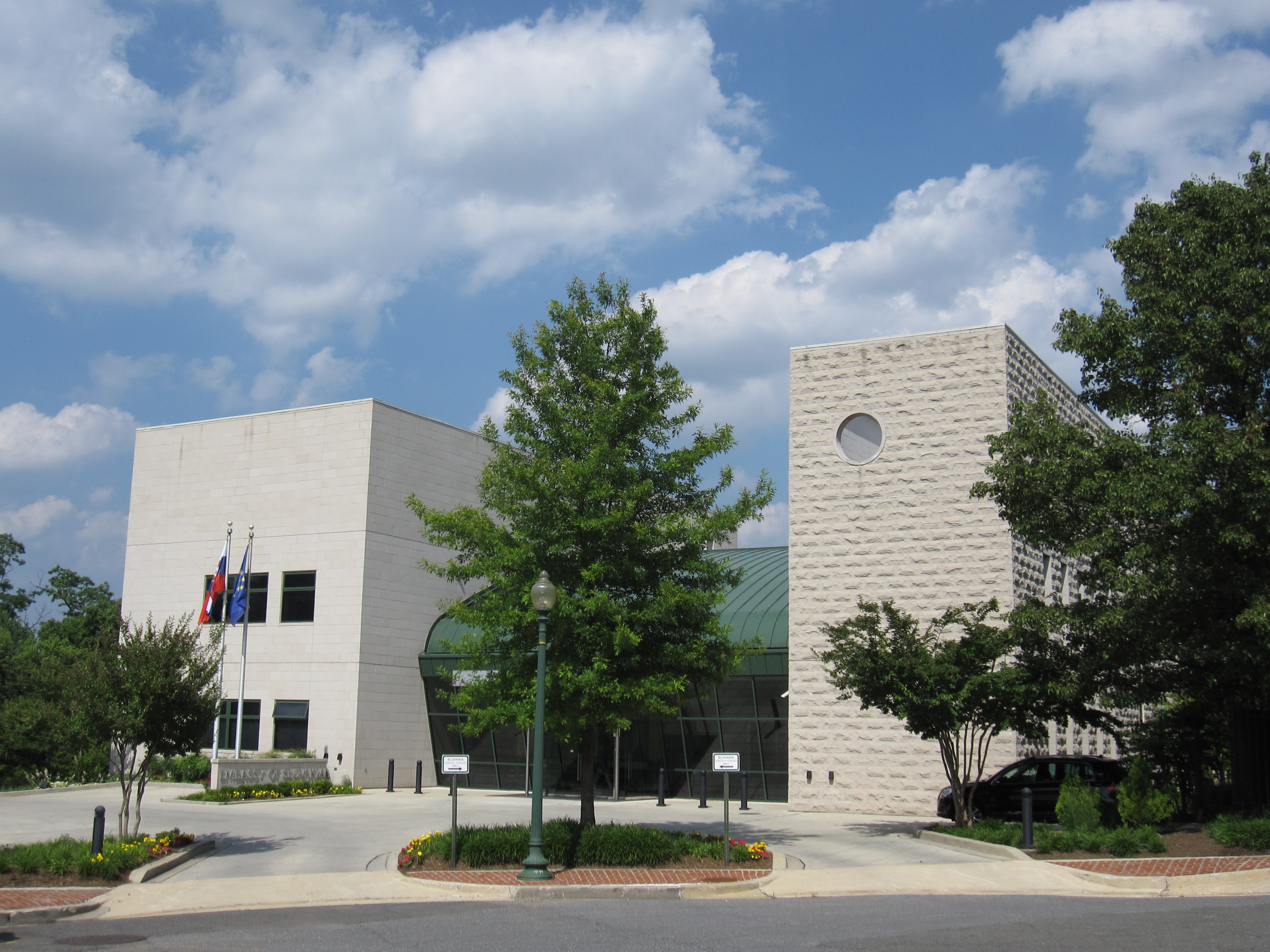
- Incumbent; Andrej Droba since December 16, 2025
- Inaugural holder: Peter Burian
- Formation: June 24, 1993

The Slovak ambassador in Washington, D. C. is the official representative of the Government in Bratislava to the Government of the United States.

== List of representatives ==
Diplomatic agrément	Diplomatic accreditation	Ambassador	Observations	Prime Minister of Slovakia	List of presidents of the United States	Term end
	June 24, 1993	Peter Burian	Charge d' Affaires ad interim			
	June 23, 1994	Brian Branislav Lichardus		Jozef Moravčík	Bill Clinton	
March 4, 1999	April 19, 1999	Martin Bútora		Mikuláš Dzurinda	Bill Clinton	
July 30, 2003	September 8, 2003	Rastislav Káčer	(*July 9, 1965, in Nova Bana (Slovakia)) educated at the Slovak Technical University (MSc in Organic Chemistry) and Institute of International Relations, School of Law, Commenius University in Bratislava.: He is married to Otilia Kacerova and has two children daughter Veronika (1996) and son Samuel (2008).; From 1994 to 1998 he was at the Slovak Mission to NATO in Brussels.; From 1992 to 2001 he was Director General at the Slovak Ministry of Foreign Affairs organized the accession process of the Ministry of Defense to NATO and let to Slovakia's invitation to join the Alliance at the 2002 Prague summit.; From February 2001 to September 8, 2003 he was State Secretary (Deputy Minister) of Defense of the Slovak Republic in Washington, DC.; In October 2013 he became Slovak Ambassador to Hungary.	Mikuláš Dzurinda	George W. Bush	
December 2, 2008	December 3, 2008	Peter Burian		Robert Fico	George W. Bush	
September 17, 2012	September 19, 2012	Peter Kmec	(* November 11, 1966, Nitra, Slovakia)	Robert Fico	Barack Obama	
	September 17, 2018	Ivan Korčok		Peter Pellegrini	Donald Trump	
	January 18, 2021	Radovan Javorčík		Igor Matovič	Donald Trump	
	December 16, 2025	Andrej Droba		Robert Fico	Donald Trump	

== See also ==
- Slovakia–United States relations
