= Loire (musician) =

American rhythm vocalist (born 1972)

Loire Cotler
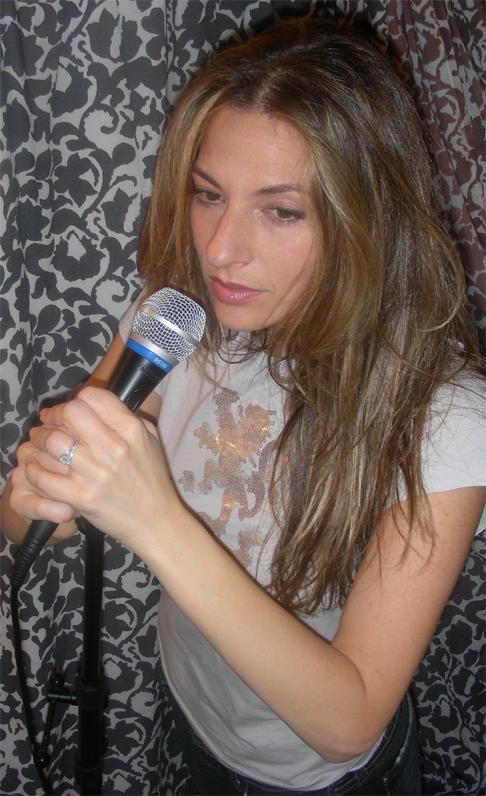
- Loire in 2007

Background information
- Born: February 14, 1972 (age 54); New York City, New York
- Genres: Film rock; folk rock; experimental; vocal percussion; jazz rock
- Occupations: Vocal artist; composer; rhythm vocalist; vocal sound designer
- Years active: 2003–present
- Labels: WaterTower; Walt Disney; Sony Classical
- Member of: Hans Zimmer Live; Glen Velez Handance; Chitravina Ravikiran
- Partner: Glen Velez
- Website: loirecotler.com

Loire Cotler (born 14 February 1972), is an American rhythm vocalist, film score soloist, composer, vocal sound designer, recording artist, educator, and music therapist known for her innovative use of Konnakol, scat singing, overtone singing, world music traditions, inter-dimensional chants, jazz rock interpretations and melismatic improvisations.

== Early life ==
Lori "Loire" Cotler was born in New York Presbyterian Hospital and spent the first few years of her life in Brooklyn, New York before her family moved to Roslyn Estates, New York. The nickname "Loire" was given to her by her best friend and she has been using that name ever since. She began studying piano at age six in the Suzuki Method. At age eleven, she was inspired to become a vocalist after a chance encounter with Cuban percussionist Cándido Camero at her brother's bar mitzvah. In 2003, Loire began to adopt the "rhythm vocalist" to describe her style. This phrase was given to her by her mentor and partner, Glen Velez.

== Film score vocal work ==
Loire's passion for cinema and film music as a child propelled her to sneak into the open doors of a local indie theater after being lured inside by the sound of Vangelis’ Chariots of Fire main theme. When it came time to declare a major at Berklee College of Music, Loire had already filled out an application to become a film scoring major, but she kept delaying to turn it in. While she was frequently hanging out in the Berklee listening library, as well as the famed Tower Records on Massachusetts’s Ave., listening to her Jazz heroes, exploring world music traditions, Alan Lomax field recordings, along with eastern meditation and astral projection studies, she also began immersing herself into scores by Max Steiner, Ennio Morricone, James Newton Howard and Hans Zimmer.

Wrestling with which road to take, she happened to come across a cassette of classical Indian percussion music with a drum language solo. It was in that moment that she chose to stay on her own path to becoming a rhythm vocalist.

In December 2017, she was discovered on YouTube by Academy Award-winning composer Hans Zimmer by renowned vocalist and vocal contractor Edie Lehmann Boddicker and legendary synthesist Michael Lehmann Boddicker.

Loire's collaboration with Zimmer and his Remote Control Productions team, including composers, Steve Mazzaro, David Fleming and Andy Page, led to her vocal work on X-Men Dark Phoenix (Original Motion Picture Soundtrack), Xperiments from Dark Phoenix (soundtrack album), and Denis Villeneuve's Dune (2021) and Dune: Part II. In 2020 Zimmer introduced Loire's work to his longtime collaborator and friend Grammy winning and multiple Oscar nominated film composer James Newton Howard. Soon after Loire began working remotely with Howard as the vocal soloist on his score for the Disney film Raya and The Last Dragon.

== Collaborations and performances ==
Loire has been touring with Glen Velez since 2003, and has also been a featured soloist in numerous performances ranging from full orchestras to small ensembles, including the Taipei Chinese Orchestra, National Chinese Orchestra, American Composers Orchestra, Parco della Musica Contemporanea Ensemble, Nederlandse Reisopera, La Notte della Taranta Popular Orchestra, Fulcrum Point New Music Project, Nederlands Blazers Ensemble, Long Beach Opera, Ensemble Fisfüz. She has performed in venues including Carnegie Hall's Zankel Hall, The Tonhalle, The Music Academy (Chennai), Auditorium Parco della Musica, Muziekgebouw, Slovak Radio Theater, The Met Museum, and Paradiso (Amsterdam). She has performed at numerous live music festivals, most notably: Ravenna Festival and Tamburi Mundi (Freiburg). In 2014 Loire performed for a live audience of 150,000 at La Notte Della Taranta, her largest audience to date.

In May 2019 Loire was invited by the US Embassy to perform music from her album 18 Wings (Daftof) following the idea by then incumbent US Ambassador to Slovakia Adam Sterling. Loire was joined by Glen Velez and cellist Jozef Luptak in a private concert event that took place at the Residence of the Ambassador in Bratislava and featured Loire and Glen's exhilarating rhythmic reimagining of The Great American Songbook. Since 2012, Loire has been the featured soloist in The News: a reality opera by the Dutch avant-pop composer JacobTV and she is credited for composing vocal parts for the arias Bounce or Decline and Lamento.

Loire maintains an active touring schedule in her duo with Glen Velez and Hans Zimmer Live. She has shared the stage with world class musicians Lew Soloff, Howard Levy, Avi Avital, Chitravina Ravikiran, Eugene Friesen, Sonny Fortune, Jozef Luptak, Milica Paranosic, Kepa Junkera, Javier Paxariño, Murat Coşkun and Enzo Rao. She has performed and recorded works by award-winning composers Edward Bilous and Robert Miller and her signature sound can be heard on music recordings, TV commercials, dance scores and feature-length documentaries and blockbuster film scores.

Loire's live performances have included radio and television broadcasts on Spanish National Radio 4, German Public Radio, Italian National Radio 3, Radio Freistadt (Austria), DRS (Swiss-German national radio), WNYC, National Public Radio, KPFK Los Angeles, KITV Hawaii, PBS, Rai Italia TV, Taipei National Television, and CBS 2.

Loire's debut album 18 Wings (Daftof) was released digitally during the COVID-19 pandemic as a tribute to the 30th anniversary of her father's death. 18 Wings features multiple Grammy artists of TRIO GLOBO - Howard Levy, Eugene Friesen and Glen Velez and highlights original music co-composed and arranged with Glen Velez, as well as their global rhythmic twist on The Great American Songbook.

== Education ==
Loire attended Long Island High School for the Arts, a gifted magnet school for the performing arts. She was chosen as honorary speaker and performer at the graduation ceremony. She went on to earn a Bachelor's degree of Music from Berklee College of Music in Boston, followed by a Master's Degree in Music Therapy from New York University. During her teens, Loire's jazz mentor Dave Burns introduced her to scat singing. He recognized that Loire had an unusual aptitude for the vocal reproduction of complex and up-tempo instrumental material. Loire cites her mentor and husband Glen Velez and his Handance Method as having the greatest influence on her approach to music. She also studied with Konnakol master ''Ghatam Subash Chandran'' and briefly with ''Vinod (VR) Venkataram.'' Other influential teachers include piano and harpsichord virtuoso Barbara Kupferberg and jazz vocalists Bob Stoloff, the late Mili Bermejo, and Dominique Eade. Loire has been invited to present masterclasses and workshops at The Juilliard School and other prestigious conservatories and universities around the World.

== Personal life ==
Loire has been openly bisexual since high school. Prior to her relationship with Velez, she was in a long term relationship with a woman who greatly influenced her decision to leave her day job as a therapist. Weeks after the 9/11 attacks while living in NYC and working full-time as a music therapist at Maimonides Medical Center in Brooklyn, and focusing on her music on the side, her girlfriend told her it was time to bring her music and voice to the world. Loire put in her two weeks notice on the spot.

Loire's awareness of the healing power of music began early in her life. She frequently turned to songwriting and improvisation as a way of coping with the tragic death of her close friend who was killed while riding his bicycle at age 15. A few days after Loire's 18th birthday, tragedy struck again when her father died on February 18, 1990, at age 45. Loire's debut solo recording 18 Wings (Daftof Records) was released in 2020 as a homage to her beloved father. The album features multiple Grammy artists, including Howard Levy, Eugene Friesen and Glen Velez. It highlights original music co-composed and arranged with Glen Velez, along with her rhythm jazz reimagining of The Great American Songbook. In the liner notes, she says “Rhythm and voice are my own wings - they are how I travel to language beyond thought.”

== Music therapy ==
Loire was a Professor of Music Therapy at The New School (2001–2007) and worked extensively in clinics, hospitals, including locked psychiatric units around New York City. She has worked with such populations as adult psychiatry, foster children/at-risk teens, autism and brain injuries. Loire continues to lend her talents to supporting Music Therapy charities and has been actively collaborating with Sounding Joy Music Therapy in Hawaii and Japan. Loire's work in the mental health field greatly impacted her approach to music. Her clinical work inspired her to see rhythm and music in more descriptive ways, such as “what is the rhythm of anxiety,” or “what are the colors of depression”.

== Discography ==
=== Filmography ===
- 2001 – In an Instant (film by Bruce Ashley; music by Lori Cotler, Nik Leman)
- 2005 – Why We Fight (film by Eugene Jarecki; composer, Robert Miller)
- 2009 – Documentary Renewing Creativity: Renewing American Culture – The Pursuit of Happiness
- 2019 – Coup 53 by Robert Miller
- 2019 – X-Men Dark Phoenix (Original Motion Picture Soundtrack) by Hans Zimmer
- 2019 – Xperiments from Dark Phoenix by Hans Zimmer
- 2020 – Hillbilly Elegy film score and soundtrack by Hans Zimmer & David Fleming
- 2020 – Raya and the Last Dragon film score and soundtrack by James Newton Howard. Featured vocalist.
- 2021 – Dune: Part One film score and soundtrack by Hans Zimmer. Featured vocalist and lyricist main theme.
- 2022 – Hans Zimmer: Hollywood Rebel (2022) Cast: Self
- 2022 - The Sandman Season 1 (TV Series) Score and soundtrack by David Buckley. Featured vocal soloist.
- 2024 – Dune: Part Two film score and soundtrack by Hans Zimmer. Featured vocalist, lyricist main theme, additional music.
- 2025 - Fateh film Instrumental. Featured vocalist and composer.
- 2025 - Diamond in The Desert: Hans Zimmer & Friends . Cast: Self
- 2025 -The Sandman Season 2 (TV Series) Score and soundtrack by David Buckley. Featured vocal soloist.
- 2026 – Ramayana: Part 1 film score and soundtrack by Hans Zimmer and A.R. Rahman. Featured vocalist and additional music.

=== Studio recordings ===
- 1991 – Kizmit – (Unreleased EP) Original songs composed by Loire Cotler in High School.
- 2003 – "Elephant Hotel"(hyperlink: http://glenvelez.com/shop/music/) (Daftof Records); Glen Velez and Lori Cotler
- 2003 – AfroMantra "Alignment" (Mambo Maniacs Record) Lori Cotler is featured on "Transparencias" (composer, Alex Garcia)
- 2005 – "Rhythms of Awakening" Glen Velez (SoundsTrue)
- 2006 – "Hiri" (Elkar) Kepa Junkera; Lori Cotler featured on "Tatihou"
- 2008 – "Rhythms of the Chakras Vol. 2" Glen Velez (SoundsTrue)
- 2009 – "Breathing Rhythms Duo" (Daftof Records); Glen Velez and Lori Cotler
- 2010 – "Herria" (Elkar/Warner Bros.) Kepa Junkera; Lori Cotler featured on "Markesaran Alaba"
- 2013 – Cucurrucucú Paloma (single release)
- 2016 – Instants of Time by Enrique Haneine
- 2020 – 18 Wings (Daftof Records)
- 2020 – Echos (Sívac Records)

=== Dance scores ===
- 2003–2011: Mimi Garrard VideoDances - featured vocalist on dance scores by Glen Velez.
- 2004: Rain (Glen Velez) performances with Buglisi Dance Theater
- 2007–present: "Trilogy" (Glen Velez) performances with Bridgman/Packer Dance
- 2009–present: "Mirage" performances with Nai-Ni Chen Dance
- 2012–present: "Whirlwind" (Glen Velez) performances with Nai-Ni Chen Dance

=== Commercials ===
- 2004 – CVS Extra Care (Robert Miller, RMI)
- 2005 – Frangelico USA Rope TV Advert
- 2009 – Tiffany & CO
- 2015 – Raw Spirit Fragrances
- 2022 – Ford Future Present (Mad World Cover)
