= Paul Hacker =

Paul Hacker may refer to:

- Paul Hacker (Indologist) (1913–1979), Indologist from Germany
- Paul Hacker (diplomat) (born 1946), American diplomat
