= List of ambassadors of the United States to Slovakia =

Ambassador of the United States to Slovakia
- Seal of the United States Department of State

- Flag of a United States ambassador

- Incumbent; Heather Rogers; Chargé d'affaires since January 16, 2026
- Nominator: The president of the United States
- Inaugural holder: Theodore E. Russell as Ambassador Extraordinary and Plenipotentiary
- Formation: November 22, 1993
- Website: U.S. Embassy - Bratislava

Until 1992 the Slovak Republic had been united with the Czech Republic as the nation of Czechoslovakia. Following World War II, a U.S. consulate was established in Bratislava, but the consulate was closed on May 27, 1950, on the order of the Czechoslovak government, at the height of the Cold War. In 1990 the consulate was reestablished in Bratislava. The Consulate was upgraded to the status of Consulate General on October 21, 1991. In June 1992, the Slovak parliament voted to declare sovereignty and the Czech-Slovak federation dissolved peacefully on January 1, 1993. The United States recognized the Slovak Republic as an independent state and established diplomatic relations with it on January 1, 1993. The embassy in Bratislava was established January 4, 1993, with Paul Hacker as Chargé d’Affaires ad interim. He was replaced by Eleanor Sutter on July 7, 1993. The first ambassador, Theodore E. Russell was commissioned to Slovakia on November 22, 1993. The United States has maintained diplomatic relations with Slovakia since 1993.

== Ambassadors ==
Name	Title	Appointed	Presented credentials	Terminated mission	Notes
Theodore E. Russell – Career FSO	Ambassador Extraordinary and Plenipotentiary	November 22, 1993	December 16, 1993	March 29, 1996	
Ralph R. Johnson – Career FSO	Ambassador Extraordinary and Plenipotentiary	January 18, 1996	April 4, 1996	May 21, 1999	
Carl Spielvogel – Political appointee	Ambassador Extraordinary and Plenipotentiary	August 3, 2000	September 7, 2000	April 15, 2001	
Ronald Weiser – Political appointee	Ambassador Extraordinary and Plenipotentiary	November 26, 2001	January 5, 2002	December 19, 2004	
Rodolphe M. "Skip" Vallee – Political appointee	Ambassador Extraordinary and Plenipotentiary	June 21, 2005	August 23, 2005	December 5, 2007	
Vincent Obsitnik – Political appointee	Ambassador Extraordinary and Plenipotentiary	November 9, 2007	December 6, 2007	January 20, 2009	
Theodore Sedgwick – Political appointee	Ambassador Extraordinary and Plenipotentiary	July 4, 2010	August 18, 2010	July 2, 2015	
Liam Wasley	Chargé d'Affaires	September 20, 2015	N/A	August 2016	
Adam H. Sterling – Career FSO	Ambassador Extraordinary and Plenipotentiary	May 25, 2016	September 6, 2016	August 7, 2019	
Bridget Brink – Career FSO	Ambassador Extraordinary and Plenipotentiary	May 29, 2019	August 20, 2019	May 18, 2022	
Nicholas Namba	Chargé d'Affaires	May 19, 2022	N/A	September 14, 2022	
Gautam Rana	Ambassador Extraordinary and Plenipotentiary	August 4, 2022	September 28, 2022	January 16, 2026	
Heather Rogers	Chargé d'Affaires	January 16, 2026	N/A	Present	

== See also ==
- Slovakia – United States relations
- Foreign relations of Slovakia
- Ambassadors of the United States
