= Dušan Rapoš =

Slovak film director, screenwriter, and composer (born 1953)

- Born: 20 June 1953 (age 73); Moravany, Czechoslovakia
- Education: Comenius University; Academy of Performing Arts in Bratislava
- Occupations: Film director; screenwriter; composer
- Years active: 1982–present
- Known for: Fontána pre Zuzanu trilogy
- Spouse: Eva Vejmělková

Dušan Rapoš (born 20 June 1953) is a Slovak film director, screenwriter, and composer who works under the name Sui Generis. He began his career as a journalist and radio editor. The founder of the production company Welcome Film, he is best known for his Fontána pre Zuzanu trilogy.

== Biography ==
Rapoš was born in Moravany in the former Czechoslovakia, to publicist Vladimír Rapoš. He is the grandson of architect Miloš Rapoš.

He graduated from the Department of Journalism at the Faculty of Arts of Comenius University in Bratislava in 1975 and went on to study film directing at the Academy of Performing Arts in Bratislava, graduating in 1982. During his studies, he worked as a journalist and radio editor. From 1982, he worked in news, film, and publishing. He is also a composer, writing music mainly for theatre productions. In 1992, he founded the production company Welcome Film.

Rapoš is married to Czech actress Eva Vejmělková. They have two daughters together. He also has two daughters from his previous marriage.

== Selected filmography ==
- Smetiarska etuda krátky film (1979)
- Falošný princ (1984)
- Fontána pre Zuzanu (1985)
- Utekajme, už ide! (1986)
- F.T. (Future Terrestrial) (1988)
- Rabaka (1989)
- Dido – Das Geheimnis des Fisches (TV miniseries, 1991)
- Fontána pre Zuzanu 2 (1993)
- Karel Kryl - Kdo jsem...? (1993)
- Suzanne (1996)
- Fontána pre Zuzanu 3 (1999)
- Cinka Panna (2008)
- Muzzikanti (2017)
- Keď draka bolí hlava (2018)

== Awards and recognition ==
2008 – Crystal Wing Award in the category of journalism and literature, shared with Ľuboš Jurík and Jozef Šuhajd, for the book Slovenský bigbít, which includes 3 DVDs containing the ten-part television series.
