= Rodolphe M. Vallee =

American ambassador

Skip Vallee
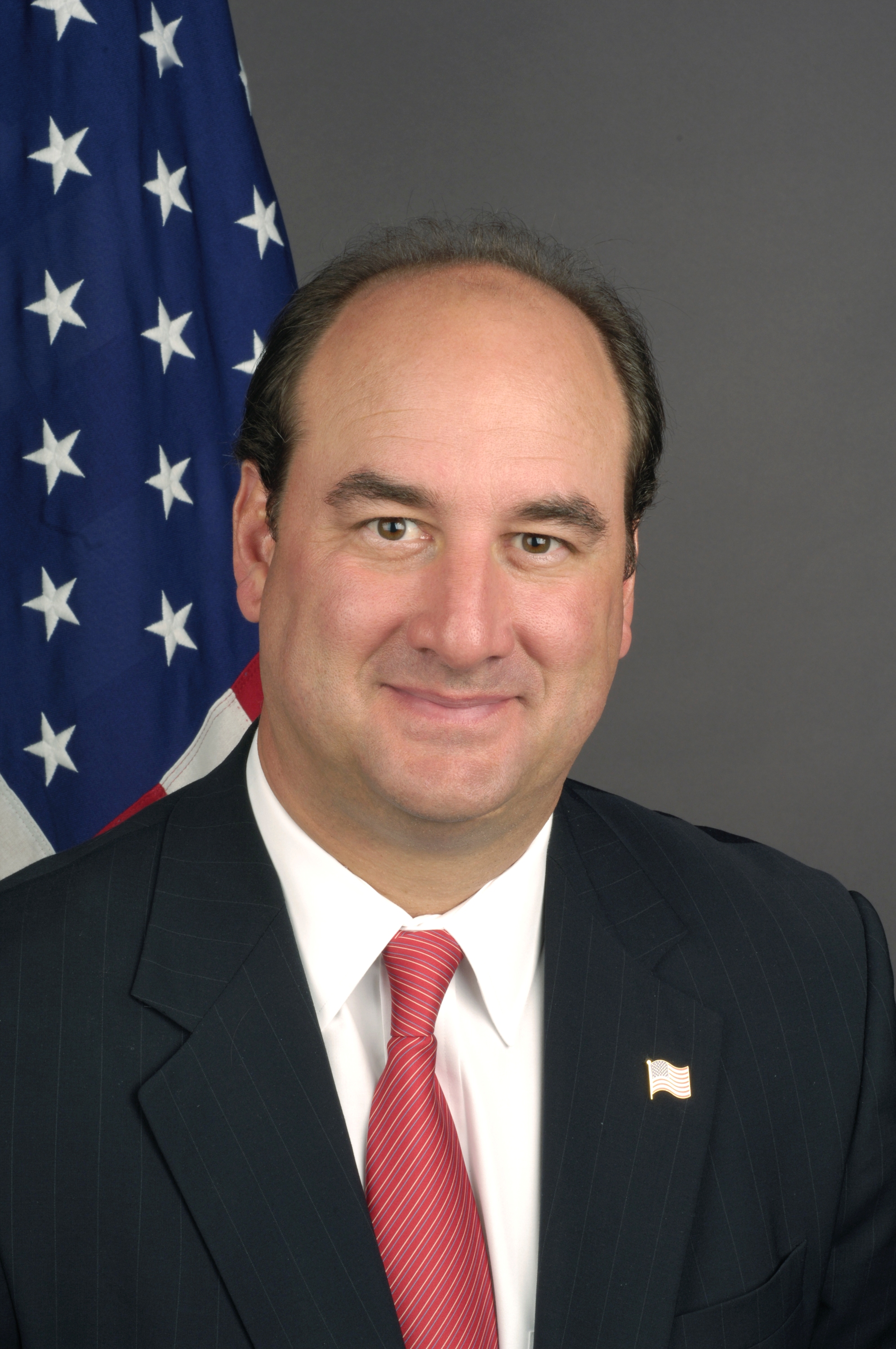

United States Ambassador to Slovakia
- In office August 23, 2005 – December 5, 2007
- President: George W. Bush
- Preceded by: Ronald Weiser
- Succeeded by: Vincent Obsitnik

Personal details
- Born: Rodolphe Meaker Vallee; 1960 (age 64–65) St. Albans, Vermont, U.S.
- Political party: Republican
- Spouse: Denise
- Education: Williams College; University of Pennsylvania

Rodolphe Meaker "Skip" Vallee (born 1960) is the former American Ambassador to Slovakia (2005–2008) and is “Chairman, CEO, and owner of R. L. Vallee, Inc., a Vermont-based energy company that includes the "Maplefields" convenience store chain, a top regional motor fuels distributorship, and an environmental remediation and consulting unit. Prior to that, he worked in executive positions for several companies involved in the development and operation of trash, biomass, hydro, and other renewable energy facilities.”,

Vallee was appointed by President Bush to the Advisory Committee for Trade Policy and Negotiation in 2001, served as a member of the Republican National Committee from 1999-2004, and chaired the Vermont delegation to the 2004 Republican National Convention.

Vallee received a Bachelor's degree in biology (with a concentration in environmental studies) in 1982 from Williams College and a Master’s degree in Business Administration in 1986 from the Wharton School at the University of Pennsylvania. He was diagnosed with multiple myeloma in 2017.

In October 2019, he was one of four Vermont gas distributors that agreed to settle a class-action lawsuit after they were accused of cheating customers out of $100 million.

On May 3, 2022, Vallee's son Charlie took his own life. He was an intelligence officer and had been battling symptoms related to long covid.

In May 2022 a tanker truck operated by RL Vallee Inc. killed a pedestrian in Montreal. The company's Google reviews has several complaints of aggressive and dangerous driving.
