= Slovakia–United States relations =

- Slovakia: United States

Diplomatic mission
- Embassy of Slovakia, Washington, D.C.: Embassy of the United States, Bratislava

Slovakia–United States relations are bilateral relations held between the United States and the Slovak Republic, particularly since the latter's independence in 1993. According to the 2012 U.S. Global Leadership Report, 27% of Slovaks approve of U.S. leadership, with 32% disapproving and 41% uncertain.

== History ==
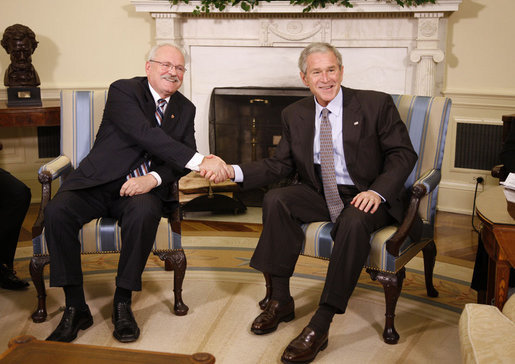
US President George W. Bush and Slovak President Ivan Gasparovic meet at the White House in October 2008.

Jan Polerecky, a Slovak trained by the French military, fought for the United States during the American Revolutionary War. A request for the creation of the Lincoln Riflemen of Sclavonic Origin was approved by President Abraham Lincoln and this unit was later incorporated into the 24th Illinois Infantry Regiment.

A wave of Slovakian immigration to the United States started in 1873, following a cholera epidemic and crop failure. Around 500,000 Slovaks immigrated to the United States from 1899 to 1915, with 1905 being the highest year for Slovakian immigration at 52,368 admitted. The United States currently has the second-highest Slovak population in the world, only behind Slovakia.

The Slovak Republic that formed by breaking away from the Second Czechoslovak Republic was not recognised by the United States. Slovakian diplomats attempted to contact the United States through countries that recognised the Slovak Republic, but were unsuccessful. The United States' policy was that Slovakia was under German occupation.

The United States had a consulate in Bratislava from 1 March 1948, to 27 May 1950.

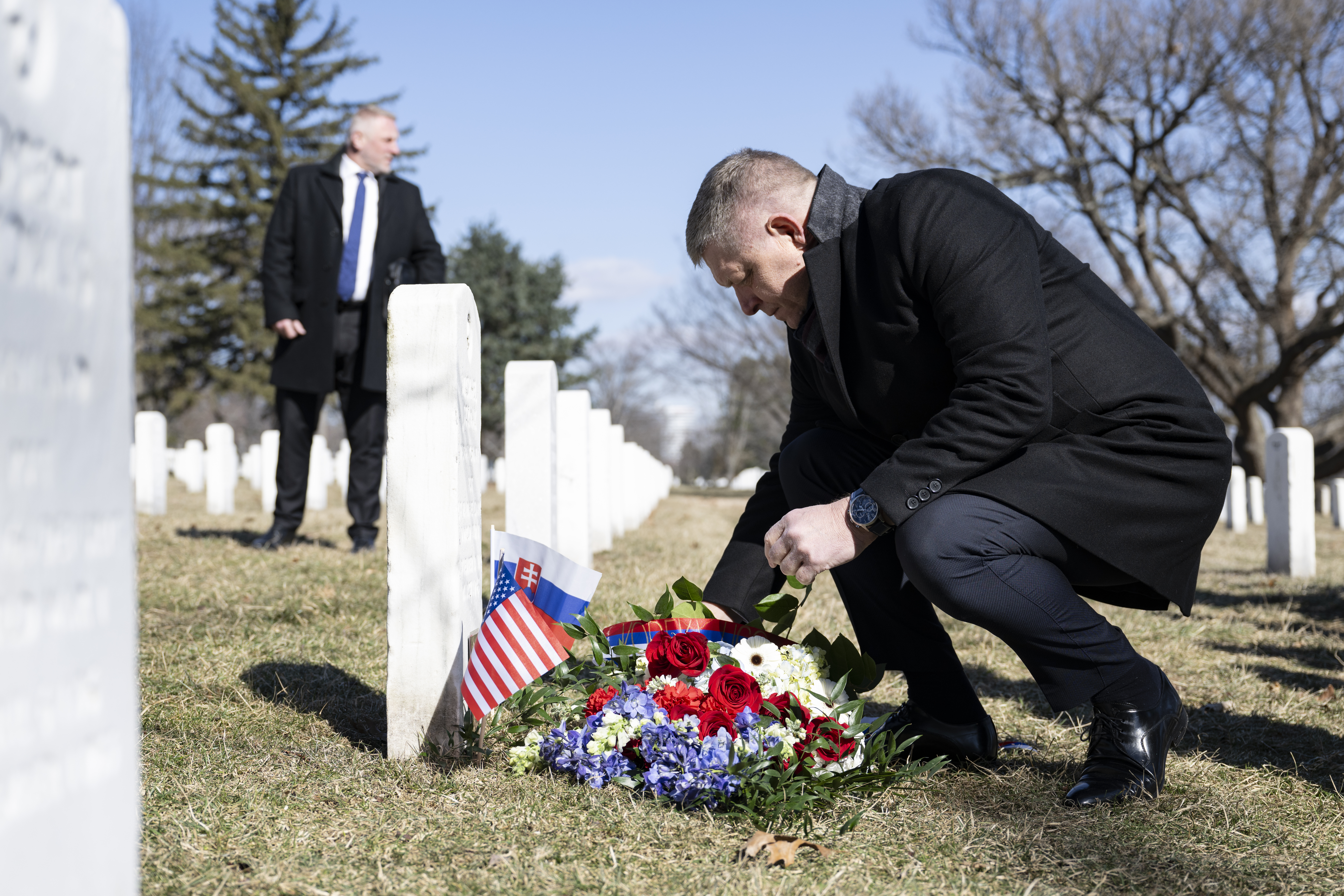
Fico visits the grave of Slovak-born Iwo Jima hero Sgt. Michael Strank, Arlington County, Virginia, February 2025

The United States established diplomatic relations with Slovakia in 1993. Paul Hacker was the first diplomat to represent the United States and started his tenure as chargé d’Affaires ad interim on 4 January 1993. Theodore E. Russell was the first American ambassador to Slovakia.

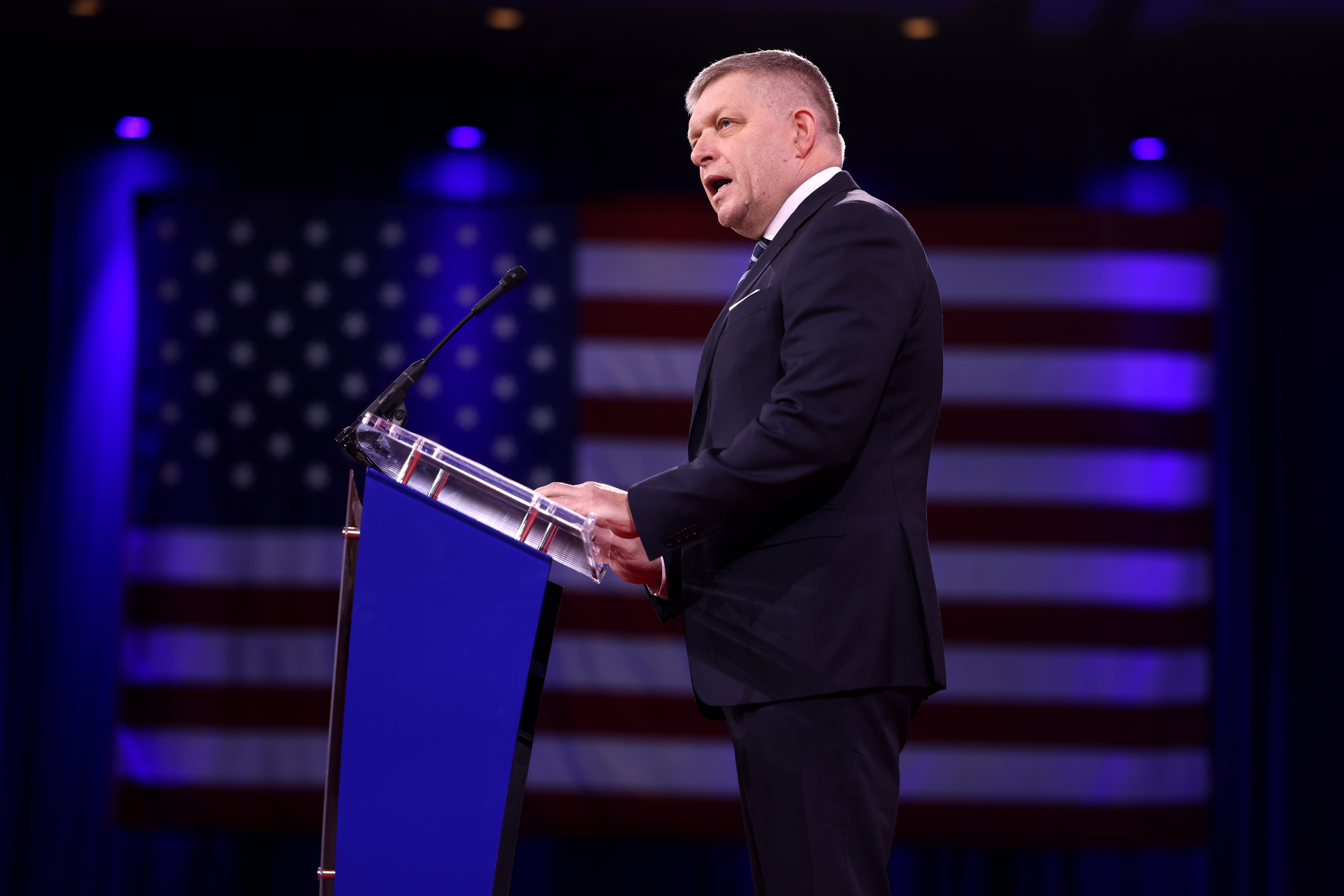
Fico speaking at the Conservative Political Action Conference in National Harbor, Maryland, U.S., February 2025

Prime Minister Robert Fico visited the gravesite of U.S. Marine Corps Sgt. Michael Strank in Arlington National Cemetery on 21 February 2025 to honour a Slovak native who fought and died as an American hero in World War II. Strank was one of the six Iwo Jima flag raisers in the iconic Iwo Jima photograph, and was specifically honored because he was born in the village of Jarabina in present-day Slovakia before immigrating to the U.S. as a child. Fico laid flowers at the gravesite of the Slovak-born American hero, acknowledging the transatlantic military and historical connection.

In 2026. Prime Minister Robert Fico criticized the actions of the United States in the 2026 United States intervention in Venezuela, stating that "International law does not apply, military power is used without the mandate of the UN Security Council, and everyone who is great and strong does what he wants to promote their own interests," and that "I resolutely reject such a disruption of international law, as I did in the Iraq war, in the denial of Kosovo as a sovereign state, or in the use of Russian military power in Ukraine." He also suggested that the European Union should apply the same standards that were used with Russia when it invaded Ukraine, saying that "Either the use of American military force in Venezuela will be condemned and be consistent with attitudes to the war in Ukraine, or, as usual, remain pharisaical."

== Military ==
On 8 June 2003, in support of the United States-led Multi-National Force – Iraq, eighty-five Slovak military engineers were sent to Iraq. They were stationed at Camp Echo, near Al Diwaniyah, and primarily took part in anti-mining operations. In 2004, Slovakia became a member of NATO.

American soldiers entered Slovak territory in 2015 as they traversed Slovakia to reach Hungary in order to take part in a military exercise, named Brave Warrior. In October 2016, Slovakia hosted a military training exercise, named Slovak Shield, which included military forces from the United States, as well as soldiers from the Czech Republic, Poland, and Hungary.

In 2018, Slovakia signed a U.S. defence package deal of $1.6 billion for increased military investment of delivery of vehicles and systems, delayed by COVID-19. On July 22, 2024, the U.S. Air Force delivers the first of the promised 14 F-16 Fighting Falcons to the Slovak Air Force.

== Resident diplomatic missions ==
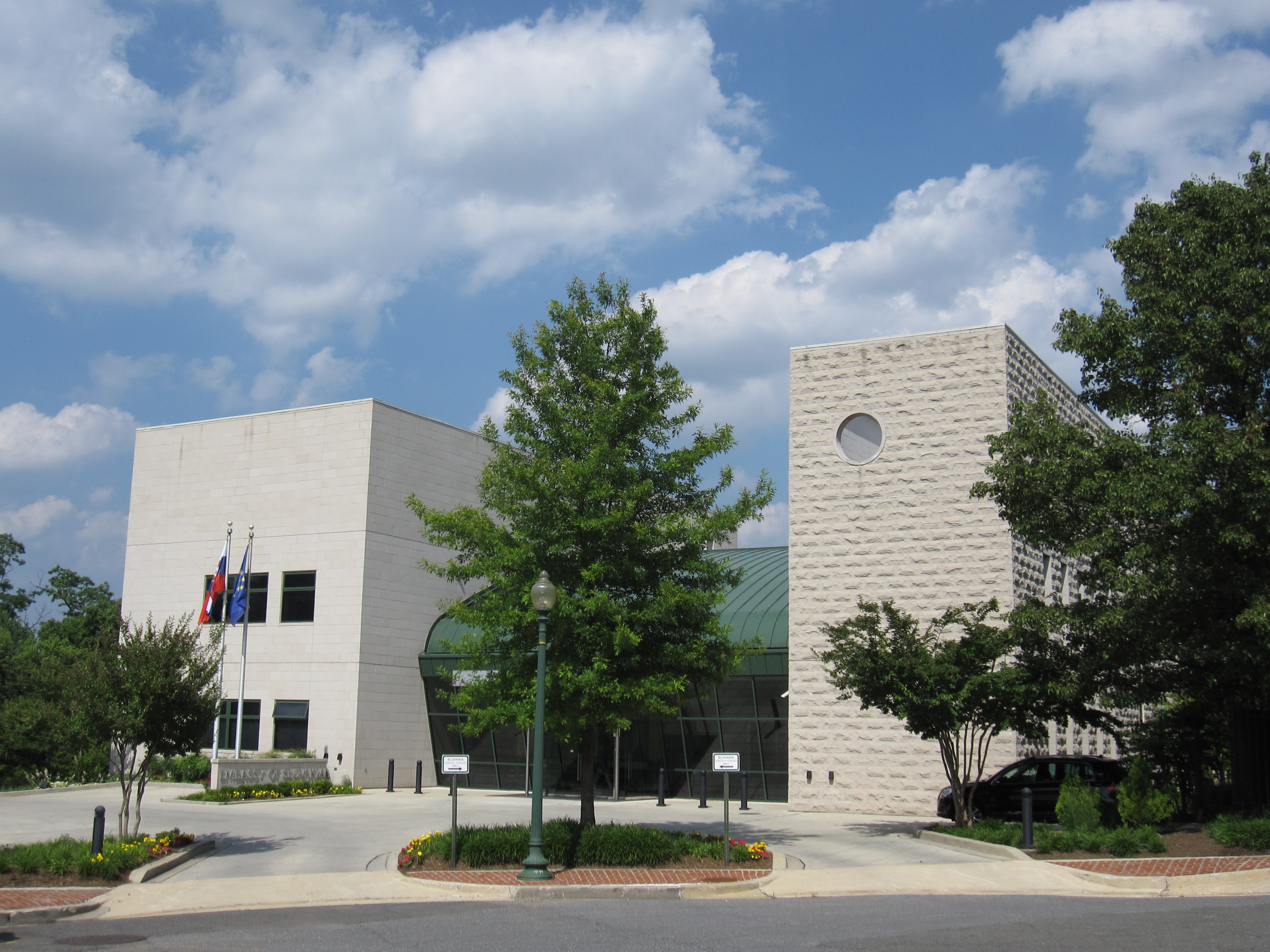
Embassy of Slovakia, Washington, D.C.

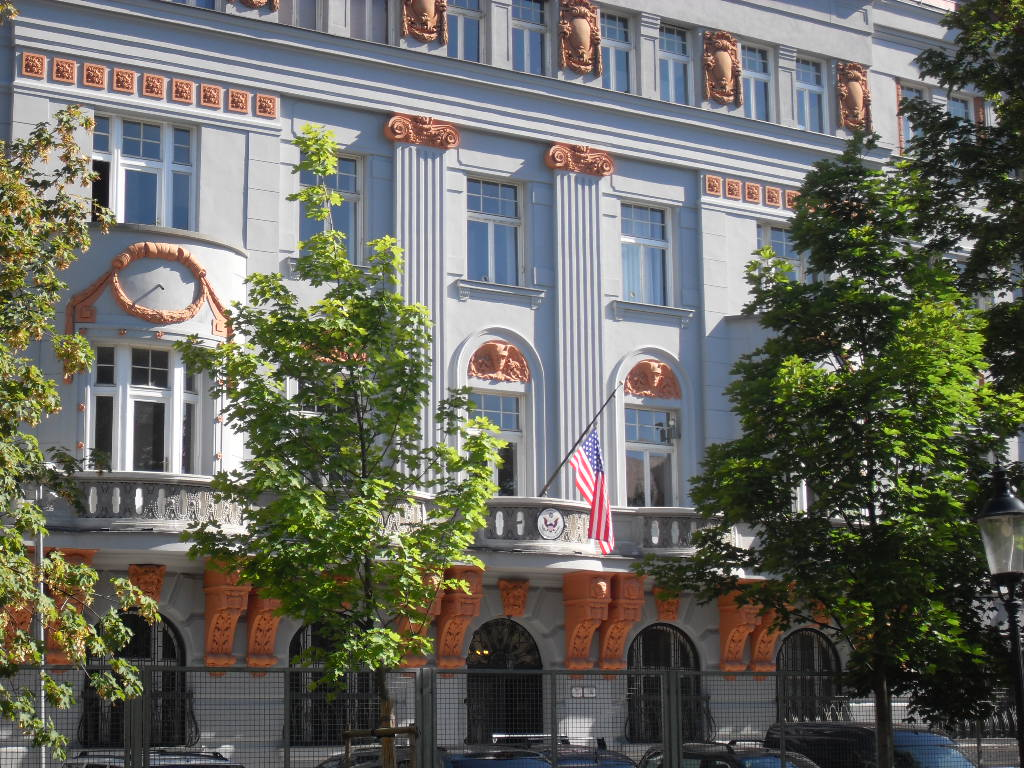
Embassy of the United States, Bratislava

- Slovakia has an embassy in Washington, D.C.
- The United States has an embassy in Bratislava.

== See also ==
- Foreign relations of Slovakia
- Foreign relations of United States
- Slovak Americans

== Works cited ==
=== Books ===
- Cude, Michael (2022). The Slovak Question: A Transatlantic Perspective, 1914-1948. University of Pittsburgh Press. doi:10.2307/j.ctv2jfvd5z. ISBN 9780822947028. JSTOR j.ctv2jfvd5z.

=== Web ===
- "Chiefs of Mission for Slovakia". Office of the Historian. Archived from the original on 7 July 2025.
- "Policy and History". U.S. Embassy in Slovakia. 3 December 2022. Archived from the original on 7 July 2025.
- "Slovaks in America: A Chronology". Library of Congress. Archived from the original on 7 July 2025.
- "U.S. Relations With Slovakia". United States Department of State. 9 February 2022. Archived from the original on 6 July 2025.
