= Gautam A. Rana =

American diplomat

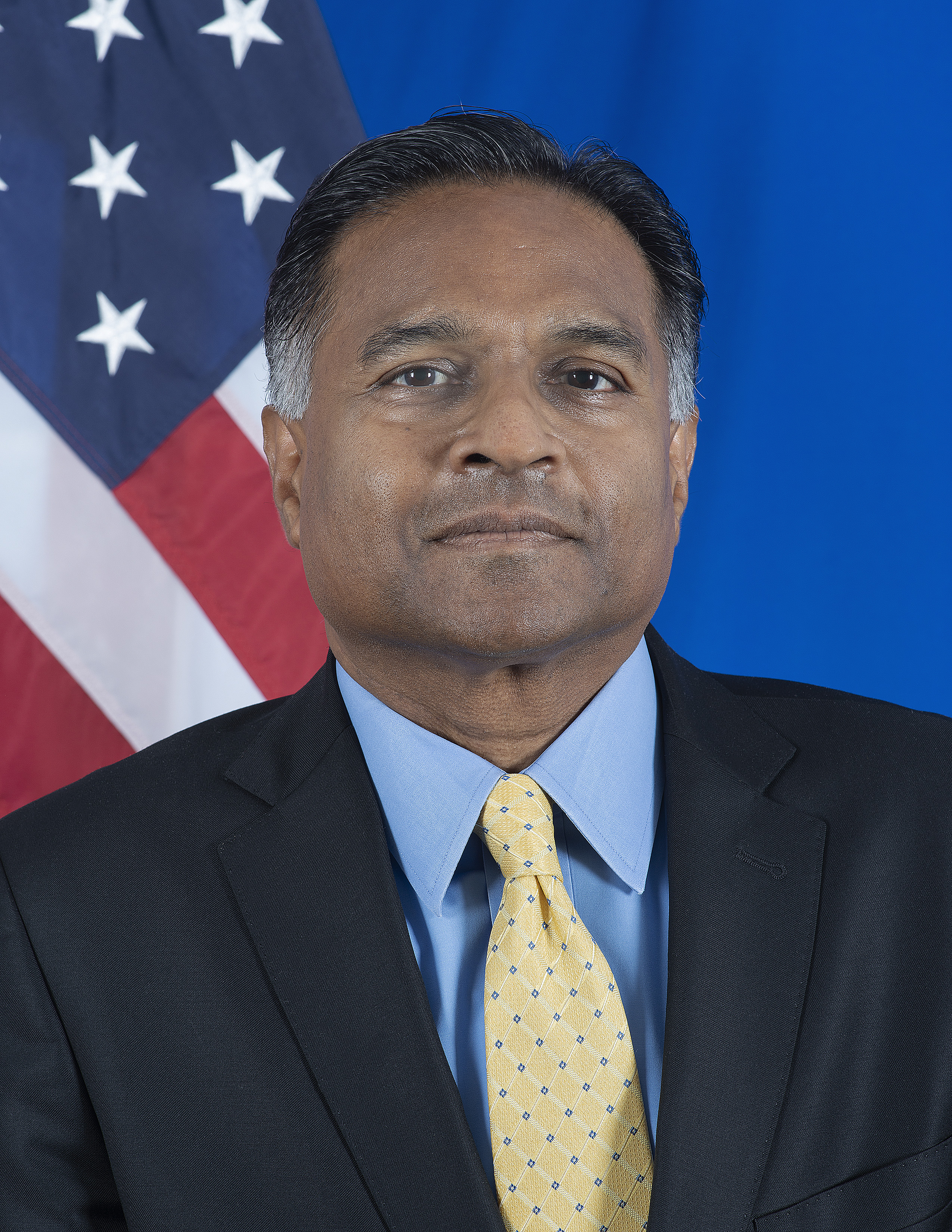

United States Ambassador to Slovakia
- In office September 28, 2022 – January 16, 2026
- President: Joe Biden; Donald Trump
- Preceded by: Bridget A. Brink

Personal details
- Education: University of Pennsylvania (BA, BS); Vanderbilt University (JD); National Defense University (MA)
- Gautam A. Rana's voice Rana's opening statement at his confirmation hearing to be United States ambassador to Slovakia; Recorded July 28, 2022

Gautam A. Rana is an American lawyer and diplomat who served as the United States ambassador to Slovakia from 2022 to 2026.

== Early life and education ==
Rana immigrated to the United States from India at around age four and was raised in an immigrant family. His experiences as an Indian-American influenced his later interest in public service and diplomacy.

Rana earned both Bachelor of Arts and Bachelor of Science degrees from the University of Pennsylvania. He then received a Juris Doctor from the Vanderbilt University School of Law, and then a Master of Arts from the National Defense University.

== Career ==
Rana is a career member of the Senior Foreign Service, with the rank of counselor. He served as deputy chief of mission of the U.S. Embassy in Algeria. Before this, he was the deputy chief of mission and chargé d'Affaires ad interim at the U.S. Embassy in Ljubljana, Slovenia.

Rana was also focused on Afghanistan and Pakistan during his stint on the National Security Council and previously served as the deputy minister counselor for political affairs at the U.S. Embassy in New Delhi.

Rana has served in various roles within the United States Department of State, working in Iraq, Pakistan, Afghanistan, and the UAE.

=== United States ambassador to Slovakia ===
On May 25, 2022, President Joe Biden nominated Rana to be the next ambassador to Slovakia. Hearings on his nomination were held before the Senate Foreign Relations Committee on July 28, 2022. The committee favorably reported his nomination to the Senate floor on August 3, 2022. Rana was confirmed by the full Senate via voice vote on August 4, 2022. He presented his credentials to President Zuzana Čaputová on September 28, 2022.

== Personal life ==
Rana speaks Hindi, Spanish, and Gujarati.

Diplomatic posts
Preceded by Nicholas Namba; Charge d'Affaires	United States Ambassador to Slovakia; 2022–2026	Vacant
