= Vincent Obsitnik =

American diplomat (born 1938)

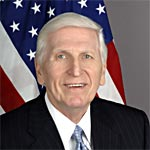

United States Ambassador to Slovakia
- In office December 6, 2007 – January 20, 2009
- President: George W. Bush
- Preceded by: Skip Vallee
- Succeeded by: Theodore Sedgwick

Personal details
- Born: 1938 (age 87–88) Moravany, Slovakia
- Party: Republican
- Spouse: Annemarie Harden
- Education: U.S. Naval Academy (BA); American University (MBA)

Military service
- Allegiance: United States
- Branch/service: United States Navy
- Years of service: 1959–1964

Vincent Obsitnik (born 1938) was sworn in as Ambassador Extraordinary and Plenipotentiary of the United States of America to the Slovak Republic on November 9, 2007, and served in this role until January 20, 2009. Prior to his current appointment, Ambassador Obsitnik was appointed in 2006 by President George W. Bush to the U.S. Presidential Delegation to the Commemoration of the 65th Anniversary of the Tragedy in Babyn Yar in Ukraine. In 2005, he was appointed by President George W. Bush to the U.S. Presidential Delegation for the Austrian State Treaty Anniversary. In October 2001, he was appointed by President George W. Bush to the U.S. Commission for the Preservation of America's Heritage Abroad and served as a member of the Commission until July 2006. The purpose of the Commission is to be concerned about the cultural heritage of Americans from Central and Eastern Europe. Ambassador Obsitnik worked to bring international attention to the plight of the 17th and 18th century Greek Catholic wooden churches of Slovakia and, through his leadership, two of the most endangered churches have been restored.

Ambassador Obsitnik has had corporate executive careers with the IBM, Unisys and Litton Corporations. At Unisys Corporation, as president of the Systems Development Division, he led a $600 million business with 3000 employees marketing and developing advanced electronic and computing systems. At Litton Corporation, he was vice president, international and directed business expansion into the European and Latin American markets. In 27 years at the IBM Corporation, his responsibilities spanned the areas of Marketing, Sales, Manufacturing, Engineering and Program Management. He spent 8 years with the IBM World Trade Corporation with manufacturing responsibilities in Europe, Latin America and Asia. In Latin America, he had overall responsibility for the management of manufacturing plants in Brazil, Argentina and Mexico. In Asia, he was responsible for manufacturing logistics of all IBM operations. Following these careers, Ambassador Obsitnik started and became President of International Investments Inc., a consulting company, working in the areas of joint ventures, technology licensing and privatization projects between the U.S. and Central Europe.

== Early life ==
Born in 1938 in Moravany, Slovakia, he immigrated with his parents that same year, prior to the occupation of Czechoslovakia by Nazi Germany. His father worked as a coal miner in Pennsylvania, after which the family moved to New Jersey, where he grew up. Upon graduating from Linden High School, in Linden, NJ, he received an appointment to the U.S. Naval Academy and graduated with the Class of 1959. He then served the next five years as an officer in the U.S. Navy, in destroyers and submarines.

Ambassador Obsitnik graduated from the U.S. Naval Academy in 1959 with honors. He received his MBA in Finance from The American University in Washington, D.C. He has also attended the IBM Advanced Management School, Sands Point, Long Island, NY; the IBM International Management School in La Hulpe, Belgium; and the Unisys Executive Program at The Wharton School, University of Pennsylvania, Philadelphia, PA.

Ambassador Obsitnik is fluent in Slovak and has an understanding of Russian. He is a marathon runner and plays tennis and squash. He is married to the former Annemarie Harden. They have four sons and twelve grandchildren.

Diplomatic posts
Preceded by Rodolphe M. Vallee	United States Ambassador to Slovakia; 2007–2009	Succeeded by Keith A. Eddins (as Chargé d'Affaires)
