= Carl Spielvogel =

American marketing executive and former ambassador (1928–2021)

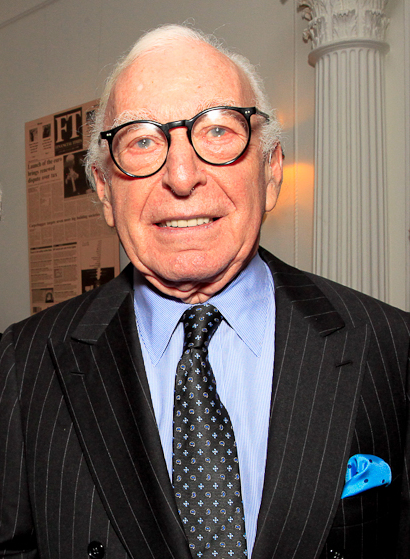
- Spielvogel in 2013

United States Ambassador to Slovakia
- In office September 7, 2000 – April 15, 2001
- President: Bill Clinton
- Preceded by: Ralph R. Johnson
- Succeeded by: Ronald Weiser

Personal details
- Born: December 27, 1928 New York City, New York
- Died: April 21, 2021 (aged 92) Manhattan, New York, U.S.
- Spouse: Barbaralee Diamonstein (m. 1981)
- Children: 3
- Education: B.B.A. Baruch College

Carl Spielvogel (December 27, 1928 – April 21, 2021) was an American marketing executive and ambassador.

He co-founded the advertising firm of Backer and Spielvogel (with Bill Backer), where he was chairman and CEO. Spielvogel conducted trade and commerce in 45 countries during a 40-year career. He was the chairman and CEO of Carl Spielvogel Associates, Inc., an international investment, management and marketing company.

Spielvogel's talents in the marketing industry were instrumental in helping to recover Israel's public image after the Lebanon War. Later in life he would refer to his efforts as developing into a personal cause célèbre.

He was appointed to the Broadcasting Board of Governors's first board in 1995 by President Bill Clinton.

In 2000 he became the United States Ambassador to Slovakia, nominated as a recess appointment. He presented his credentials on September 7, 2000, and served in that post until April 15, 2001. He was a member of the Council of American Ambassadors, and the Council on Foreign Relations.

He also was chairman of the United Auto Group and was elected to the board of many companies.

== Early life and work ==
Spielvogel was born to a Jewish family in New York City on December 27, 1928, the son of Sadie (Tellerman) and Joseph Spielvogel. He received a B.B.A. degree from Baruch College of the City University of New York. He began his working career in 1950 as a copy boy in the news department, he then became a reporter, and eventually a six-times-a-week columnist for The New York Times, until 1960.

In the years of 1960-1972 he was at McCann Erickson and eventually was promoted to EVP and General Manager. Until 1980, Spielvogel was vice chairman, and a member of the executive committee and the board of directors of the Interpublic Group, with which he was associated for twenty years, one of the world's largest communications marketing companies. Before joining Interpublic's parent company in 1972, he was chairman of the executive committee and executive vice president and general manager of McCann-Erickson, Inc., Interpublic's largest subsidiary.

== Backer & Spielvogel ==
In 1980, Spielvogel became Founder/Chairman and CEO of Backer & Spielvogel, which became Backer Spielvogel Bates Worldwide, Inc., one of the world's largest marketing and advertising communications companies. This worldwide corporation had 178 companies in 55 countries, and employed 8,500 persons—1,000 Americans and 7,500 nationals of the countries in which business was being conducted.

== United Auto Group ==
From October 1994 until April 1997, Spielvogel was chairman and chief executive officer of the United Auto Group, Inc., then the nation's largest publicly owned auto dealership group, and one of the first automobile dealership groups to go public on the New York Stock Exchange, with sales approximating $4 billion. In 1994 he became a member of the Board of Bates Worldwide Chairman.

== Political career ==
In 1995, he was appointed by President Bill Clinton, and approved by the U.S. Senate, to the U.S. Broadcasting Board of Governors, which is responsible for Voice of America, Radio Free Europe, Voice of Asia, Radio Marti, Worldnet, and the other non-military "Voices" of the United States Government. In his youth, Spielvogel was a 2nd Lieutenant in the U.S. Air Force Reserve, and an infantry soldier in the U.S. Army from 1953-55. In 1997, he was named chairman of the International Advisory Board of the Financial Times, the leading global and financial newspaper. He was also chairman of the board of advisors of the Intermedia Advertising Group, Inc., a research and technology company. In 1998, he was appointed a Fellow at the Center for Business and Government, at the John F. Kennedy School of Government, Harvard University. He was a member of the Columbia University Institute for the Study of Europe, and a board member of the Weissman Institute of International Studies at Baruch College.

In 1999 he was appointed by President Clinton as Ambassador to the Slovak Republic. At the time, Senator Charles Grassley put a hold on several ambassadorial appointments, including those of Spielvogel and Richard Holbrooke. This hold lasted for 16 months until August 2000 when President Clinton named him to the post as a recess appointment. He was Ambassador until April 2001. For his outstanding service to Slovakia, President Rudolf Schuster presented him with the Presidential Medal of Honor of Slovakia. In 2008, he was appointed to the board of trustees of the State University of N.Y. (SUNY), the largest state university system in the U.S., comprising 65 college campuses, with approximately 480,000 students.

=== Efforts in Israel ===
The need for a more robust Israeli public relations campaign, termed "Hasbara" in Hebrew, became evident following the Lebanon war. In response, the American Jewish Congress sponsored a conference in Jerusalem in 1983, chaired by Carl Spielvogel, to explore ways of improving Israel's tarnished image abroad. The conference brought together top public relations and advertising executives from the United States, along with journalists and academics from both countries. The discussions focused on devising a strategy to "sell" post-Lebanon Israel to the U.S. media, emphasizing Israel's strategic importance to the United States, its affinity with Western cultural values, its physical vulnerability, and its desire for peace. The conference also addressed the challenging issue of West Bank settlements, highlighting the need for a sophisticated PR campaign to present a balanced and positive image of Israel to the world.

In 1984, building on the momentum from the previous year's conference, the American Jewish Congress organized a dinner event that successfully raised $200,000 to enhance the public relations skills of Israeli government spokespersons. This initiative was part of a broader effort to improve Israel's image and communication strategy on the global stage. The dinner honored Carl Spielvogel, a renowned advertising executive, and Barbaralee Diamonstein, a distinguished writer, for their contributions to the field of communications. The funds raised were earmarked for the Hasbara Project, an internship program designed to train foreign service officers in effective communication techniques by placing them with American companies. This endeavor underscored the importance of not only executing strategic actions but also articulating the rationale behind them to international audiences.

== Posts and activity ==
Spielvogel was the chairman and CEO of Carl Spielvogel Enterprises, a global investment, consulting and marketing company. He has been elected to the board of many publicly owned companies, including the board of directors of Interactive Data, Inc. and Apollo Investment, Inc. He previously was a member of the board of directors of CBS Market Watch, Inc.; Interpublic; Josephson International; CMA; Foamex, Inc.; the United Auto Group; Culligan Water Technologies; Alliant Foodservice, Inc., Barneys New York, Hasbro, Inc., Kraft International, Bank Hapoalim, International Creative Management, Manhattan Industries and The Franklin Corporation.

Spielvogel had a lifelong involvement in civic and cultural organizations: a member of the board of trustees, and former chairman of the Business Committee of The Metropolitan Museum of Art; a member of the board of trustees and the executive committee of Lincoln Center for the Performing Arts; a former member, for 20 years, of the board of trustees of Mt. Sinai Hospital; a former member (for 22 years) of the board of trustees of the Philharmonic Symphony Society of New York, Inc.; a former member (for 18 years) of the executive committee and the board of trustees of the Asia Society, where he was Trustee Emeriti and co-chair of the Business Council of the Asia Society. He was also a member of the Council of American Ambassadors, the Weissman Institute of International Studies, the Council of Foreign Relations, the Silurian Society and the Yale Club. He was on the board of trustees of Eureka Communities, which worked to rebuild depressed inner city neighborhoods across the nation, "one leader at a time" for ten years. During the 20 years he was executing duties of a Trustee of Mt. Sinai Hospital in New York. Active for forty years in the New York State Democratic Party, he also was chairman of its board of trustees. In 1999, Spielvogel received the Humanitarian award from H.E.L.P, which provides transitional housing for the homeless.

He was named chairman of "The Committee in the Public Interest" by Mayor Abraham Beame during the New York City fiscal crisis; and named chairman of "the NYC Public/Private Partnership" by Mayor David Dinkins, and chairman of the campaign to "Clean up New York", by Mayor Edward I. Koch. He had been a member of the Council for the Study of Europe at Columbia University, a Fellow at The Center for Business and Government at The John F. Kennedy School of Government, Harvard University.

Spielvogel had been an Independent Director of Barneys New York Inc. since 1999. Since April 1997 he had been a Director of Culligan International Company (Alternatively Culligan Water Technologies Inc). From February 1996 to May 20, 2009 he discharged functions of a Director of Interactive Data Corporation. Beginning from 1992 he held an appointment of a Director of Hasbro Inc. He had been a member of the International Advisory Board for the Business Council for the United Nations; the board of the International Tennis Hall of Fame; the Municipal Art Society; the board of Bennington College; the board of the New York State Council for the Humanities; and the board of the International Media Fund.

== Awards and achievements ==
Carl Spielvogel was the recipient of the American Academy of Achievement's Golden Plate Award in 1973, presented by author and broadcaster Lowell Thomas. A past president of the board of trustees of the Baruch College Fund; he was the recipient of an honorary LL.D. degree from Baruch College in 1987. He was the recipient in June 1990 of the Baruch College Distinguished Alumnus Award for Outstanding Career Accomplishment. In September 1992, Baruch College inaugurated an annual lecture series in Spielvogel's honor entitled, "The Carl Spielvogel Lecture Series on Global Marketing Communications." In 1998, he was elected to the City College Communications Hall of Fame.

In 2008, in an attempt to interest honor students of Baruch College in pursuing careers in the U.S. Department of State, Spielvogel funded a program which was named to honor the service of City College graduate, former Secretary of State, Colin Powell. The program is entitled "The Colin Powell Fellows," and two summer interns have been selected each year to serve at the U.S. Department of State.

== Personal life ==
Spielvogel lived in New York City and Southampton New York, with his wife Barbaralee Diamonstein-Spielvogel, the author of 20 books on the arts, architecture, preservation and public policy. As of 2018 he kept a position of the chairman and CEO of Carl Spielvogel Associates, Inc.. He died on April 21, 2021, in Manhattan.

Diplomatic posts
Preceded by Ralph R. Johnson	United States Ambassador to Slovakia; 2000–2001	Succeeded by Ronald Weiser
