= Bridget Brink =

American diplomat and politician

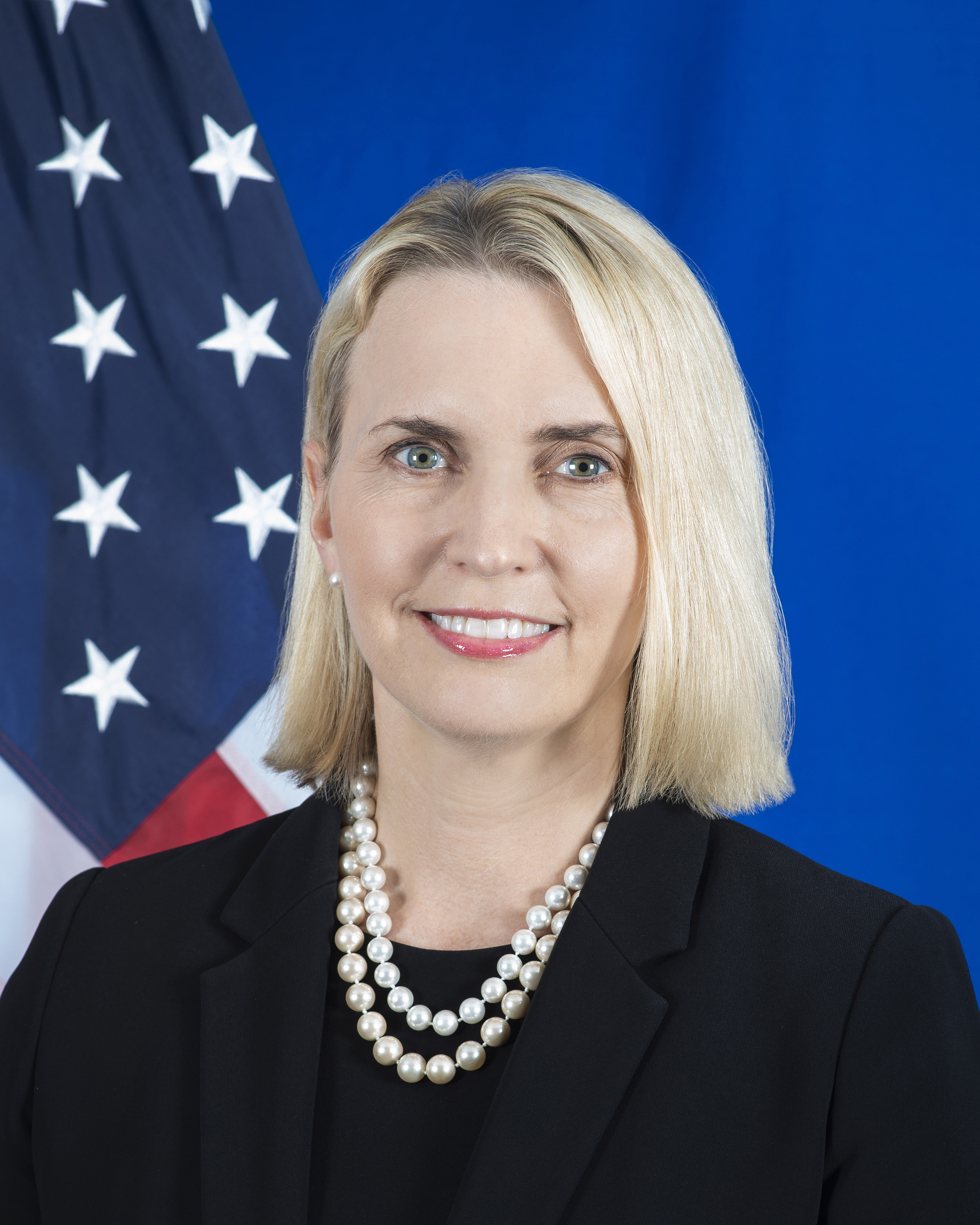
- Official portrait, 2022

United States Ambassador to Ukraine
- In office May 30, 2022 – April 10, 2025
- President: Joe Biden; Donald Trump
- Preceded by: Kristina Kvien (chargé d'affaires)
- Succeeded by: John Ginkel (chargé d'affaires)

9th United States Ambassador to Slovakia
- In office August 20, 2019 – May 18, 2022
- President: Donald Trump; Joe Biden
- Preceded by: Adam H. Sterling
- Succeeded by: Gautam A. Rana

Personal details
- Born: 1970 (age 55–56)
- Party: Democratic
- Spouse: Nicholas Higgins
- Children: 2
- Education: Kenyon College (BA); London School of Economics (MSc)
- Website: Campaign website
- Brink's voice Brink's opening statement at her confirmation hearing to be United States ambassador to Ukraine; Recorded May 10, 2022

Bridget Ann Brink (born 1970) is an American diplomat and politician who served as the United States ambassador to Ukraine from 2022 to 2025 under Presidents Joe Biden and Donald Trump. A career Foreign Service officer, she joined the State Department in 1996 and served under five presidents before retiring with the rank of Career Minister.

Brink worked mainly on Europe and Eurasia, with postings in Belgrade, Tbilisi and Tashkent. She was director for the Aegean and South Caucasus on the National Security Council from 2009 to 2010, and a deputy assistant secretary in the Bureau of European and Eurasian Affairs from 2015 to 2018. In 2019, she was appointed as the ninth United States ambassador to Slovakia, where she remained until 2022.

Biden nominated Brink to Ukraine in April 2022, two months after the start of the full-scale Russian invasion. She was confirmed by voice vote on May 18, 2022, and she became the first Senate-confirmed ambassador to Ukraine since Marie Yovanovitch was recalled in 2019. Over the next three years she oversaw the delivery of American military and humanitarian help and pushed for anti-corruption reforms in Ukraine.

In April 2025, she resigned as ambassador following pressure from Ukrainian President Volodymyr Zelenskyy, three years in Ukraine away from her family, and disagreements over the Trump administration's stance on Ukraine. In June 2025 Brink, a Democrat, announced her candidacy for the U.S. House in Michigan's 7th congressional district. She finished second in the August 2026 primary, losing to Sunrise Movement co-founder Will Lawrence.

== Early life and education ==
Brink grew up in western Michigan, first in Spring Lake with her single mother and then Grand Rapids with her grandparents. She graduated from East Grand Rapids High School in 1987. Brink earned a Bachelor of Arts degree in political science cum laude from Kenyon College in 1991 and two master's degrees from the London School of Economics (LSE), in international relations and political theory. Before entering the Foreign Service she worked as a Volunteer in Service to America in Blanding, Utah.

== Career ==
After joining the United States Department of State in 1996, Brink served as a consular political officer in the U.S. Embassy in Belgrade from 1997 to 1999. She then served as a Cyprus desk officer until 2002, and as a special assistant for Europe to the Under Secretary of State for Political Affairs until 2004. From 2005 to 2008, Brink served as political-economic chief in Tbilisi, Georgia.

From 2008 to 2009, Brink served as the deputy director for southern European affairs at the U.S. Department of State. She then joined the United States National Security Council and from 2009 to 2010, she served as director for the Aegean and South Caucasus, where she helped coordinate U.S. foreign policy and advance U.S. interests with Turkey, Greece, Cyprus, Georgia, Azerbaijan, and Armenia. In 2011, Brink returned to Georgia as deputy chief of mission at the U.S. Embassy in Tbilisi.

Brink served as deputy chief of mission at the U.S. Embassy in Tbilisi from 2011 to 2014, and in the same role in Tashkent, Uzbekistan from 2014 until August 2015, when she became deputy assistant secretary in the Bureau of European and Eurasian Affairs, a position she held until 2018. She speaks Russian, and by 2019 had received eight Department of State awards.

In 2018, Foreign Policy reported that Brink was slated to be nominated as the US ambassador to Georgia, but the government rebuffed her due to alleged predisposition toward former Georgian President and then-opposition leader Mikheil Saakashvili.

=== U.S. ambassador to Slovakia ===
In 2019, President Donald Trump nominated Brink to become the ambassador to Slovakia.

=== U.S. ambassador to Ukraine ===
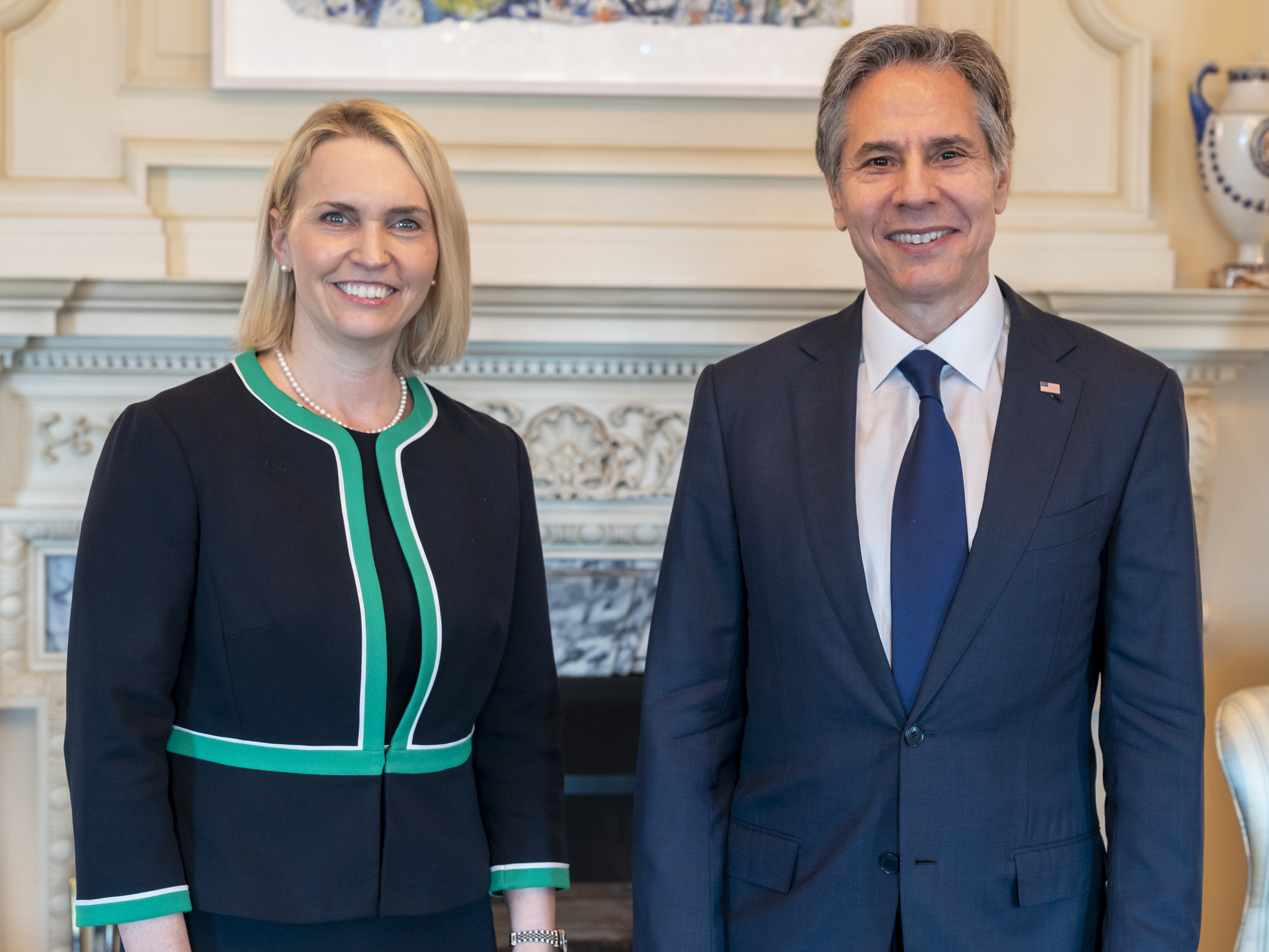
Brink with U.S. Secretary of State Antony Blinken in May 2022

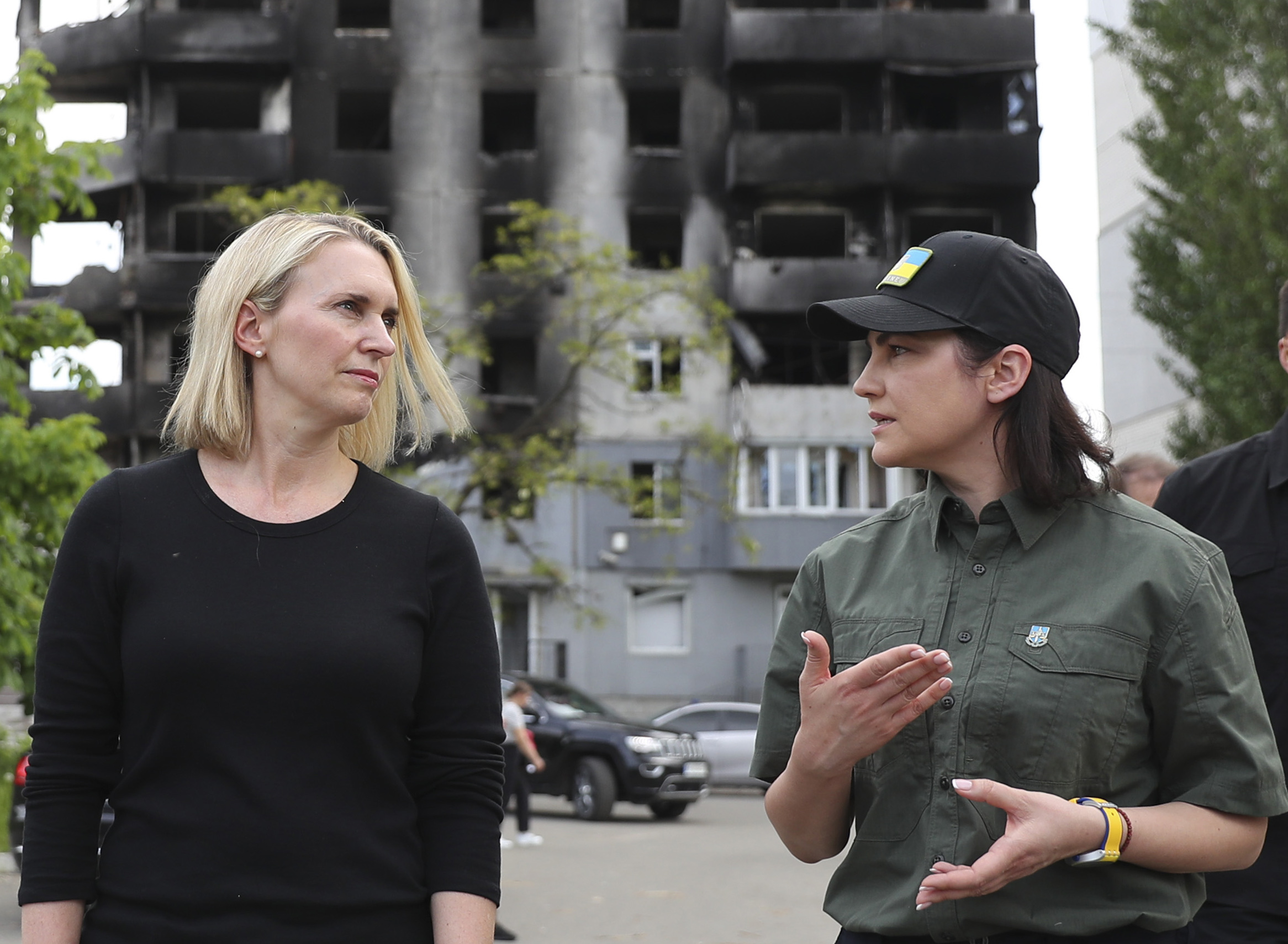
Brink with Prosecutor General of Ukraine Iryna Venediktova in Borodianka in June 2022

On April 25, 2022, Brink was nominated by President Joe Biden to serve as the United States ambassador to Ukraine. On May 18, 2022, she was unanimously confirmed via voice vote of the Senate after Senator Chuck Schumer requested she be fast-tracked. She presented her credentials on May 30, 2022, and took office during the Russian invasion of Ukraine. Her confirmation came the same day the U.S. embassy in Kyiv reopened after a three-month closure and filled a post that had been vacant since the resignation of Marie Yovanovitch in 2019.

During her time as ambassador, Brink was a supporter of reform in Ukraine regarding governmental corruption and forming lasting democratic institutions, a stance which was viewed unfavorably by some Ukrainian officials.

==== Russian invasion of Ukraine ====
On July 22, 2022, Brink communicated the position of the United States that it would continue to "support Ukraine for as long as it takes." On July 26, she met with Jonathan Markovitch, the Chief Rabbi of Kyiv. In December, it was reported that she had met with aides of Volodymyr Zelenskyy in person to securely share the State Department's plans for his visit to the United States on December 23, 2022.

In April 2025, Brink made a social media post about a recent missile strike on Kryvyi Rih that received a sharp rebuke from Zelenskyy for omitting Russia's role in the strike. This incident, as well as another where she translated a message praising Trump for his cricism of Zelenskyy that was first posted by Secretary of State Marco Rubio. The post went viral in Ukraine and received many negative responses. This led to Zelenskyy pressuring for her to resign.

Brink stepped down as ambassador on April 10, 2025. She reportedly chose to resign due to disagreements with the Trump administration, pressure from Zelenskyy, and the toll of working in a war zone away from her family for nearly three years. Brink's resignation was seen as another upheaval amidst the State Department's reorientation away from Ukraine and towards Russia.

In a May 2025 interview with the New York Times, Brink said that the reason for her resignation was due to her opposition to the Trump administration's position on Ukraine, specifically the pressure that the Trump administration was placing on Ukraine and not on Russia.

=== 2026 congressional campaign ===
On June 18, 2025, Brink announced that she would run in the Democratic primary for the U.S. House of Representatives in Michigan's 7th congressional district, with the goal of challenging Republican incumbent Tom Barrett in 2026.

Brink's campaign was endorsed by former Michigan governors Jennifer Granholm and James J. Blanchard, former Michigan House speaker Joe Tate, Lansing Mayor Andy Schor, and State Senator Sam Singh. Brink was also endorsed by U.S. reps Lois Frankel and Adam Smith, along with former Democratic House Whip David Bonior.

The Detroit News reported that Brink was not registered to vote in the district in 2024. She reported on a financial disclosure form that in 2025 she owned four investment properties in Washington, D.C., two of which are valued between $1 million and $5 million. Her campaign responded that she leases out three of the homes, and that they brought in between $230,000 to $2.1 million in rent in 2025. Brink bought a riverfront home in Lansing a few weeks before launching her campaign in May 2025, and she became a registered voter in the district the next month.

Brink was defeated in the primary election by activist William Lawrence.

== Personal life ==
Brink is the mother of two boys, and her husband, Nicholas Higgins, also works for the U.S. Foreign Service. The family currently lives in Lansing. In the summer of 2025, Brink was diagnosed with stage 1 breast cancer, which was removed successfully and did not necessitate chemotherapy.

== See also ==
- List of current ambassadors of the United States

Diplomatic posts
Preceded by Adam H. Sterling	United States Ambassador to Slovakia; 2019–2022	Succeeded by Gautam A. Rana
Preceded by Kristina Kvien; Acting	United States Ambassador to Ukraine; 2022–2025	Succeeded by John Ginkel; Acting
