= The Sandman (soundtrack) =

Soundtrack album

The Sandman: Season 1 (Soundtrack from the Netflix Original Series)

Soundtrack album by David Buckley
- Released: August 5, 2022
- Genre: Soundtrack
- Length: 82:15
- Label: WaterTower Music

The Sandman: Season 2 (Soundtrack from the Netflix Original Series)

Soundtrack album by David Buckley
- Released: July 2, 2025
- Genre: Soundtrack
- Length: 78:09
- Label: WaterTower Music

The Sandman (Soundtrack from the Netflix Original Series) is the soundtrack album to the 2022 television series, The Sandman, based on the eponymous series by Neil Gaiman. The album features the original score composed by David Buckley.

== Background ==
The series was scored by British composer David Buckley, who was nominated for an Emmy Award in the Outstanding Theme Music category in 2017 for his work on The Good Fight. He used a wide range of sounds, from recordings with a large orchestra (at Synchron Stage Vienna) and a choir to early music instruments such as the viola da gamba and baroque flutes, as well as esoteric sounds. He additionally combined these with modern electronic textures to "bridge time within the music." The soundtracks for seasons 1 and 2 were released on August 4, 2022, and July 2, 2025, respectively by WaterTower Music.

== Track listing ==
The Sandman: Season 1 (Soundtrack from the Netflix Original Series)
No.	Title	Length
1.	"The Kingdom of Dreams (Main Title Theme)"	2:14
2.	"Meet Ethel Cripps"	2:54
3.	"The Threshold of Desire"	2:43
4.	"Jessamy's Flight"	2:40
5.	"The Houses of Secrets & Mysteries"	5:20
6.	"Dream's Escape"	2:51
7.	"Johanna & Rachel"	3:43
8.	"The Oldest Game"	5:27
9.	"A Kind Word and a Friendly Face"	2:28
10.	"God Tells Me to Do It"	2:38
11.	"Every Hundred Years"	1:42
12.	"A True Annulet"	3:59
13.	"Dreams Shape the World"	3:24
14.	"The Throne Room of the King of Dreams"	5:01
15.	"Jed Walker, Guardian of Sleepers"	2:11
16.	"Sleep Well, John"	2:49
17.	"New Dreams to Spur the Minds of Men"	2:01
18.	"Even a Nightmare Can Dream"	3:22
19.	"A Remedy for Poison"	2:22
20.	"The Truth of Mankind"	2:14
21.	"Into the Vortex"	1:34
22.	"Return to the White Horse"	1:27
23.	"This is Fiddler's Green"	3:27
24.	"Children of the Endless"	4:04
25.	"There Is Hope"	4:25
26.	"New Dreams… A New Age"	3:05
27.	"Fortune Go with You"	2:10
Total length:		82:15

The Sandman: Season 2 (Soundtrack from the Netflix Original Series)
No.	Title	Length
1.	"A Family Gathering"	4:29
2.	"The Stage Is Set"	2:28
3.	"Lord Morpheus Bids You Welcome"	3:34
4.	"The Song of Orpheus (Choral Version)"	1:39
5.	"I Should Have Died Long Ago"	4:25
6.	"The Age of Fire and Flame"	4:50
7.	"The Dancing Woman" (featuring Azam Ali)	1:44
8.	"Isn't Love Wonderful?"	1:57
9.	"How Now, Mad Spirit?"	2:59
10.	"The Reckoning"	4:25
11.	"Nuala's Glamour"	1:27
12.	"Thermidor"	4:22
13.	"Queen of the First People" (featuring Loire Cotler)	6:20
14.	"A Pumpkin With a Gun"	3:42
15.	"Processional: The Endless"	1:40
16.	"No Longer the Same"	4:25
17.	"The Soul of Henrietta"	3:59
18.	"Not Even in My Dreams"	2:44
19.	"Any Number of Destinies"	4:12
20.	"Absent Friends, Lost Loves & Old Gods"	4:01
21.	"Your Time Has Come"	2:34
22.	"It Is at an End"	2:21
23.	"When I'm Gone" (by Liminal & Austin Fray)	1:55
24.	"The Song of Orpheus" (by Ruairi O'Connor)	1:57
Total length:		78:09
