= Fateh (2025 film) =

2025 Indian film by Sonu Sood

- Theatrical release poster
- Directed by: Sonu Sood
- Written by: Sonu Sood; Ankur Pajni
- Story by: Sonu Sood
- Produced by: Sonali Sood; Umesh KR Bansal
- Starring: Sonu Sood; Jacqueline Fernandez
- Cinematography: Vincenzo Condorelli
- Edited by: Yash Parikh; Chandrashekhar Prajapati
- Music by: Score: John Stewart Eduri; Songs: Yo Yo Honey Singh; Shabbir Ahmed; Haroon - Gavin; Vivek Hariharan
- Production companies: Shakti Sagar Productions; Zee Studios
- Distributed by: Zee Studios
- Release date: 10 January 2025
- Running time: 127 minutes
- Country: India
- Language: Hindi
- Box office: est. ₹18.5–30.70 crore

Fateh (transl. Victory) is a 2025 Indian Hindi-language action thriller film written and directed by Sonu Sood in his directorial debut. Produced by Shakti Sagar Productions, and Zee Studios and co-produced by Ajay Dhama, the film stars Sood in the titular role, alongside Naseeruddin Shah, Jacqueline Fernandez, Vijay Raaz and Dibyendu Bhattacharya. It follows Fateh, an ex-agent who comes out of his tranquil life in order to bring down the entire cyber mafia syndicate when a local girl falls victim to it and goes missing.

The film was officially announced in December 2021, while its title was revealed in October 2022. Principal photography commenced in March 2023 and concluded in October 2023.

Fateh was theatrically released on 10 January 2025 and received mixed reviews from critics.

== Premise ==
Fateh Singh, an ex-special ops officer, lives a peaceful life as a dairy farming supervisor in Punjab until a village girl, Nimrit Kaur, falls prey to a cybercrime syndicate headed by Raza and Satya Prakash. Joining forces with Khushi Sharma, an ethical hacker, Fateh uses their combined skills to rescue Nimrit and destroy the cybercrime syndicate.

== Cast ==
- Sonu Sood as Fateh Singh
- Jacqueline Fernandez as Khushi Sharma
- Vijay Raaz as Satya Prakash
- Naseeruddin Shah as Raza
- Nagineedu as Ramana Reddy
- Dibyendu Bhattacharya as Nishit Biswas
- Prakash Belawadi as Aayappa
- Shiv Jyoti Rajput as Nimrit Kaur
- Suraj Jumani as Ronnie
- Binnu Dhillon as Sandhu
- Saurav Lokesh as Balaji
- Akashdeep Sabir as Chaddha
- Sheeba Akashdeep Sabir as Surjeet, Nimrit's mother
- Soundous Essayd Moufakir as Raza's assistant
- Viral Patel as Viral
- Shamim Masrur Khan as brother
- Shubham Chaudhary as Deaf Man
- Nyra Sachar as Tittu
- Rehaan Sachar as Jolly
- Nishan Cheema as Ranjeet Singh
- Simran Rana as News Anchor
- Atharva Bhatia as Happy Singh
- Kiranbir Kaur as Satvant Kaur
- Onkar Gill as Jita

== Production ==
=== Development ===
The film was announced by Zee Studios in December 2021. It marks the directorial debut of actor Sonu Sood.

=== Filming ===
Filming began in March 2023 in Punjab and wrapped in October 2023.

== Music ==
Fateh

Soundtrack album by Yo Yo Honey Singh, Shabbir Ahmed, Haroon–Gavin and Vivek Hariharan
- Released: 30 December 2024
- Genre: Feature film soundtrack
- Length: 43:37
- Language: Hindi
- Label: Zee Music Company

Official audio
- Fateh Full Album on YouTube

The songs were composed by Yo Yo Honey Singh, Shabbir Ahmed, Haroon–Gavin and Vivek Hariharan, while the background score was composed by John Stewart Eduri. It also features an instrumental track by Hans Zimmer. Zimmer did not work directly in the film, but his pre-recorded composition, "To the Moon", was used.

The first single titled "Fateh Kar Fateh" was released on 12 December 2024. The second single titled "Hitman" was released on 17 December 2024.

Track listing
No.	Title	Lyrics	Music	Singer(s)	Length
1.	"Fateh Kar Fateh"	Mandeep Khurana	Haroon–Gavin	Arijit Singh	3:40
2.	"Hitman"	Leo Grewal, Paradox	Yo Yo Honey Singh	Yo Yo Honey Singh	3:05
3.	"Ruaa Ruaa"	Mandeep Khurana	Haroon–Gavin	Stebin Ben, Rupali Moghe	3:46
4.	"Nindiya"	Mandeep Khurana	Vivek Hariharan	Hamsika Iyer, Tineke Van Ingelgem	3:37
5.	"Heer"	Shabbir Ahmed, Ajay Pal Sharma	Shabbir Ahmed	Vishal Mishra, Asees Kaur	4:08
6.	"To The Moon"	Instrumental	Hans Zimmer	Instrumental	3:49
7.	"Call To Life"	Instrumental	Loire Cotler	Loire Cotler	3:49
8.	"Roohdaari"	Mandeep Khurana	Vivek Hariharan	Jubin Nautiyal, Vivek Hariharan	4:01
9.	"Waaheguru Kahey Mann Mera"	Mandeep Khurana	Haroon–Gavin	Sukhwinder Singh	3:02
10.	"Rona Taqdeer"	Shabbir Ahmed, Ajay Pal Sharma	Shabbir Ahmed	B Praak, Saloni Thakkar	4:03
11.	"Roohdari" (Reprise Version)	Mandeep Khurana	Vivek Hariharan	Yashika Sikka, Vivek Hariharan	3:37
Total length:					43:37

== Marketing ==
In early December 2024, Sonu Sood and co-star Jacqueline Fernandez visited the Mahakaleshwar Temple in Ujjain to seek blessings for their film.

== Release ==
=== Theatrical ===
Fateh was released on 10 January 2025.

=== Home media ===
The film began streaming on Disney+ Hotstar from 7 March 2025.

== Reception ==
=== Critical reception ===
Ronak Kotecha of The Times of India gave 3.5/5 stars and wrote, "At its core, Fateh highlights the vulnerabilities of our fast-paced digital lives. While its blood-soaked narrative may not resonate with everyone, it effectively underscores the urgency of its theme." Ganesh Aaglave of Firstpost gave 3.5/5 and wrote "Fateh is a big-screen entertainer and deserves an audience for its crisp storytelling and stylish action sequences."

Bollywood Hungama gave 3.5/5 stars and wrote, "Fateh is a slick action entertainer that exposes the horrors of loan apps, a burning issue in the country right now. Sonu Sood is impressive as an actor and also as director in this film that has the potential to surprise though the opening will be impacted due to limited buzz." Trisha Bhattacharya of India Today gave 2.5/5 stars and wrote, "For fans of Sonu Sood or those looking for a light masala entertainer with a socially relevant theme, Fateh might be worth a watch. However, it’s not a film that will linger in your mind long after the credits roll." Tanmayi Savadi of Times Now gave 2.5/5 stars and wrote, "Fateh offers nothing new in terms of the plot. The saving graces are the actors who put their heart and soul into making it a bearable affair. If you are a fan of Sonu Sood, Fateh could make for a decent watch. Otherwise, it suffers from unexciting treatment even when style and action are in abundance."

Devesh Sharma of Filmfare gave 2.5/5 stars and wrote, "the film boasts of several slick action scenes but lacks an even pace." Jagadish Angadi of Deccan Herald gave 2.5/5 stars and praised Sood's performance in the action sequences but criticized its excessive violence and lack of originality in plot and screenplay. Saibal Chatterjee of NDTV gave 2.5/5 stars and wrote, "Fateh is marked by dizzying momentum if not sustained clarity. Sonu Sood delivers a no-frills lead performance that is perfectly in sync with the spirit and substance of the film."

Mayur Sanap of Rediff gave 2/5 stars and wrote, "Dark, disturbing, and full of gore; Fateh is gung-ho in its efforts to make this stylised action yarn as brutal as possible." Shubhra Gupta of The Indian Express gave 2/5 stars and wrote, "Your tipping point depends upon how much sickening, relentless violence you can handle: clearly, the action choreographers have had a lot of fun, and you go along up until a point. After that, it all becomes an empty, exhausting blur." Shubham Kulkarni of OTTplay gave 2/5 stars and wrote, "Fateh has very little to offer for redemption in a runtime that is crisp but filled with a lot of things that aspire to be John Wick-styled drama but can only manage a weak replica of Animal, which is such a sad trajectory for any film."

Anuj Kumar of The Hindu wrote "Bollywood begins 2025 with a bloody nose as Sonu Sood goes hammer and tongs to create a space for himself on the high table." Rishabh Suri of Hindustan Times wrote "While Fateh does not go out of its way to subvert the action genre, the film’s international treatment — especially in the action sequences — is definitely bound to impress people." Rahul Desai of The Hollywood Reporter India wrote, "Sonu Sood's directorial debut is dotted with inspired action sequences and clumsy writing."

=== Box office ===
According to Bollywood Hungama, Fateh concluded its theatrical run with a worldwide gross of ₹18.50 crore. While ABP News and ET Now reported that the collection was ₹30.70 crore.
