= Barbaralee Diamonstein-Spielvogel =

American historian (born 1932)

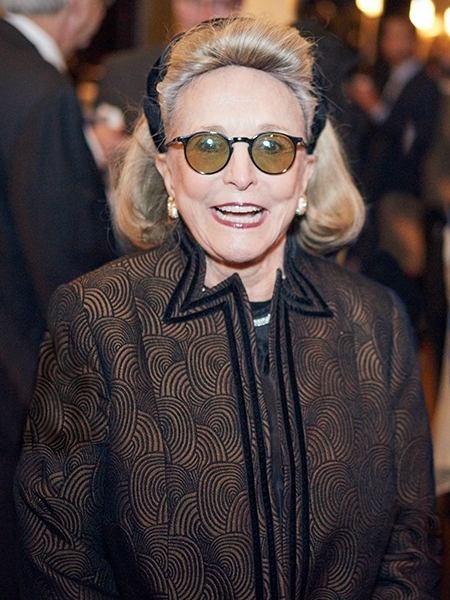
- Born: January 27, 1932 (age 94); New York City, U.S.
- Years active: 1960s–present
- Known for: Cultural Affairs, Historic preservation; political activism
- Spouses: Alan Diamonstein (m. 1956; div. 1972); Carl Spielvogel (m. 1981; deceased 2021)

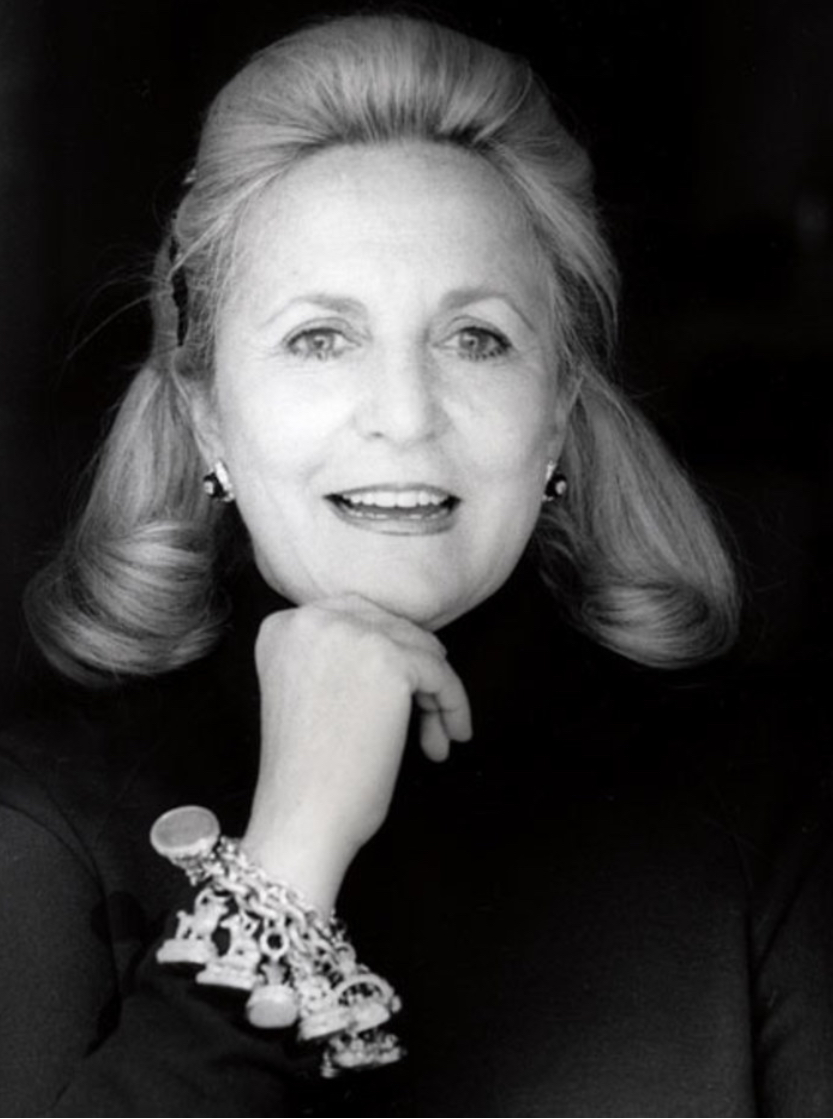

Barbaralee Diamonstein-Spielvogel, born January 27, 1932) is an American preservationist, historian, author, and television producer. She is an advocate for the preservation of the historic built environment and the arts. A graduate of New York University, she has worked in the fields of art, architecture, crafts, historic preservation, fashion, and public policy in the U.S. She is the author of 25 books, numerous articles and essays, and recipient of many honors and awards. She is a former White House Assistant, the first Director of Cultural Affairs in New York City, the longest serving New York City Landmarks Preservation Commissioner and chair of the New York State Council on the Arts. Barbaralee Diamonstein-Spielvogel was married to renowned business executive, Carl Spielvogel, for forty years. He died in 2021.

== Career ==
From 1963 to 1966, she served as a White House Assistant at The White House, where she helped create the White House Fellows, the Presidential Scholars Program, and the first and only White House Festival of the Arts in 1965. In 1966, she was appointed by Mayor John V. Lindsay as the first Director of Cultural Affairs in New York City. As director, she organized the first public art exhibition, which was in Bryant Park with artist Tony Smith, the first public performance in Central Park by the Metropolitan Opera, the first city-wide Poetry Festival, and the first week-long festival of films about New York at the Regency Theatre (with a talk after each film by a notable critic or scholar, such as Pauline Kael, Vincent Canby, Donn Alan Pennemaker, Andrew Sarris, and Brendan Gill). Another of her important contributions as first Director was to codify the inclusion of cultural institutions in the New York City annual budget process; under her leadership, the 15 cultural institutions housed in City-owned buildings, or on City-owned property, which had been receiving their City support from the Bureau of the Budget, were added to the Cultural Affairs agency budget.

In 1972, Mayor Lindsay appointed Diamonstein-Spielvogel to be a Commissioner of the NYC Landmarks Preservation Commission. She served until 1987, the longest serving Commissioner for this agency. She also served, for more than a decade, on the NYC Advisory Commission for Cultural Affairs (1975 to 1986); now the Cultural Affairs Advisory Commission. In this role, she created and became Chair of the Mayor's Awards of Arts and Culture. Diamonstein-Spielvogel was appointed a Fellow at the Aspen Institute in 1977; served on the Board of the Municipal Art Society, and as Chair of its Benefit Committee from 1973 to 1983; and was a Founding Member of the New York Landmarks Conservancy, where she created of the Living Landmarks Program.

From 1987 to 1995, she was named Chair of the NYC Landmarks Preservation Foundation, where she created and funded programs for the placement of Historic District street signs, descriptive markers, and maps in each of New York City's then-84 Historic Districts, which have since become models for similar initiatives throughout the United States. The historic markers and street name signs were designed pro bono by renowned designer Massimo Vignelli and colored terra cotta, black and white, to blend well with many building materials. They were reviewed and approved by both the Landmarks Preservation Commission, and the Public Design Commission, and became City standards for NYC Historic Districts after Diamonstein-Spielvogel entered into an agreement with the city, for the NYC Department of Transportation to maintain the signs and finance additional signs.

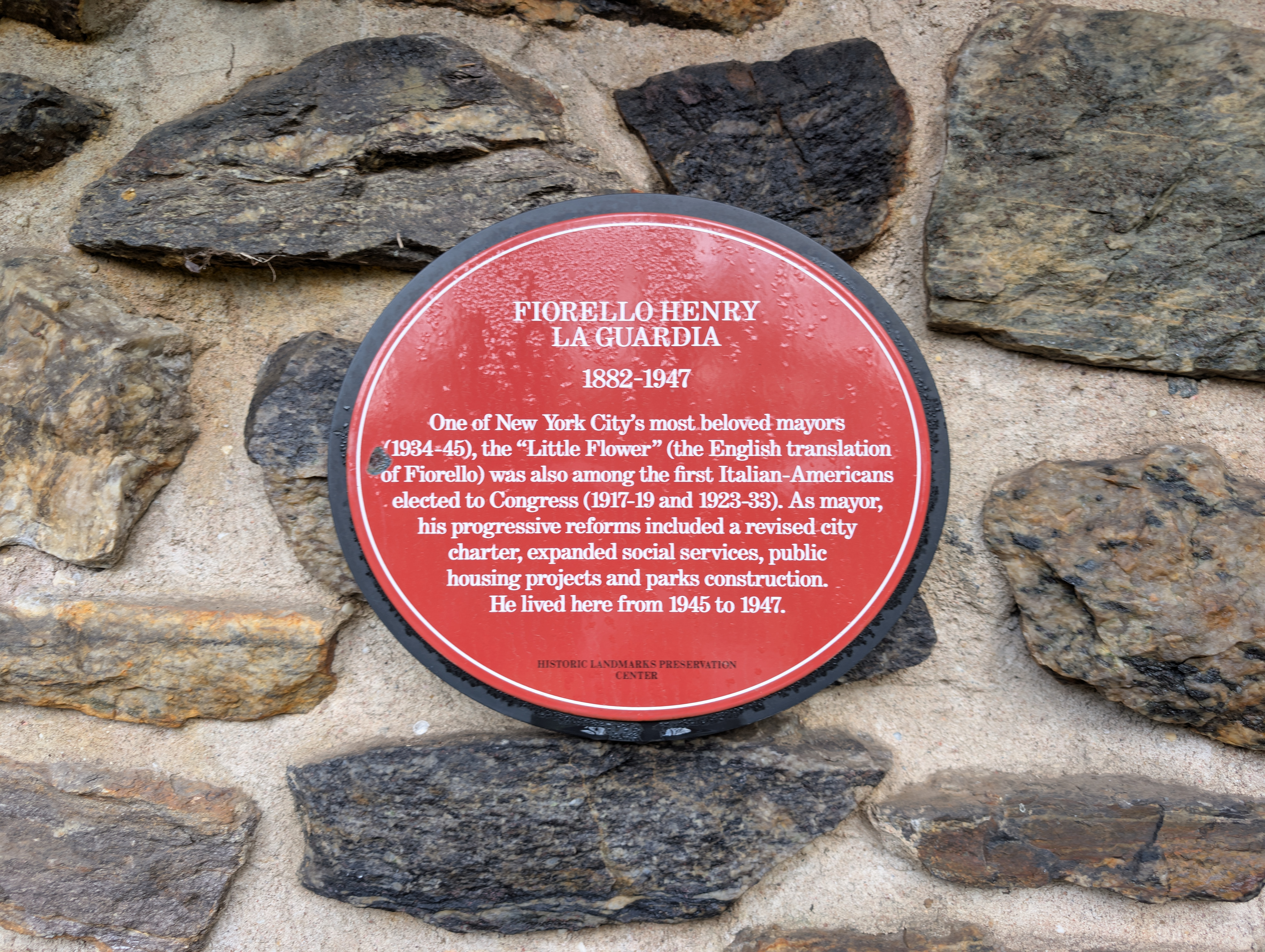
A medallion of the Historic Landmarks Preservation Center

In 1995, she became Chair of Historic Landmarks Preservation Center (HLPC), where she created a Cultural Medallion program which documents notable occurrences, distinguished individuals and other important aspects of New York City's cultural, economic, political and social history. The medallions were also designed pro bono by Massimo Vignelli.

In 1987, she was appointed by President Ronald Reagan to the Board of the United States Holocaust Memorial Museum, where, a Founding Member, she served as Chair of the subcommittee that commissioned all of the original art created for the museum. She was appointed by Mayor David Dinkins to the Art Commission of the City of New York (now the Public Design Commission), and served as his representative from 1991 to 1994.

In 1996, she was appointed to the United States Commission of Fine Arts by President Bill Clinton, and was the first woman Vice Chair of the Commission, where she served until 2003. In 2010, Diamonstein-Spielvogel was appointed a founding director of the Trust for the National Mall in Washington D.C.

President Barack Obama appointed her a Commissioner, in 2009, of the American Battle Monuments Commission, which has responsibilities related to the design, construction, and maintenance of military memorials throughout the world. She chaired the ABMC New Memorials Committee, and represented the U.S.A. at Armistice commemorations and memorial dedications in the Netherlands, France, Italy, Belgium, England, Guam, and Iceland. On July 28, 2013, during the 60th anniversary commemorations of the signing of the armistice that ended the Korean War, she dedicated a U.S. monument that was dedicated in the United Nations Memorial Cemetery in Busan, South Korea. It was the first non-World War I or World War II monument constructed by ABMC outside the U.S. Diamonstein-Spielvogel represented ABMC and led the U.S. delegation at the Busan anniversary events, where she was the keynote speaker and laid a wreath in honor of the memory of American, Korean and U.N. Troops. The event was attended by leaders and veterans of 21 participating nations. In 2017, she represented ABMC and spoke at the dedication of the Dartmouth Monument, in Dartmouth, England, on the occasion of the 73rd Anniversary of the D-Day landings.

In 2018, she was appointed as a Founding Member to the newly-formed American Battle Monuments Foundation. Dr. Diamonstein-Spielvogel was appointed to the President's Advisory Committee on the Arts by President Biden in March 2022.

In 2012, she was named the Chair of NYC Landmarks50 Alliance, a voluntary group of more than 150 member organizations, collaborating to commemorate the 50th anniversary (April 19, 2015) of the NYC landmarks law. The Alliance's ongoing goal is to create a community of purpose, and to facilitate dialogue among all New Yorkers who care about the historic built environment.

This effort continued her long-term goal to engage public interest and support for historic preservation among a wide array of New Yorkers. Starting in 1980, she had organized commemorative celebrations for the 15th, 25th, 30th, 35th, 40th, 45th, 50th, 55th, and most recently, the 60th Anniversary of the Passage of the NYC Landmarks Law in 2025.

Her creative outreach and output for these efforts has included provocative discussions, scholarly panels, luncheon talks, musical and theatrical performances, gala benefits, exhibitions, auctions of artist re-imaginings of the New York City flag, lighting the Empire State Building, marking all of the historic districts on the Queens Museum panorama, NASDAQ bell-ringing and signage, and lively installations of bus shelter signage, subway cards, Times Square signage, and highway billboards, all created to share the message “Honor our Past, Imagine our Future.”

For the 60th Anniversary of the passage of the NYC landmarks law in 2025 (which coincides with the 400th anniversary of the founding of New York City), in partnership with OutFront Media, she created a year-long commemorative trivia contest, to engage and divert subway riders young and old with fresh and interesting facts about New York City, its history, its culture, and its architecture. As part of these commemorative efforts, she is, as well, the editor for, and a contributor to, Beyond Architecture: the NEW New York, published December 2024 by the New York Review of Books. The book includes essays from well-known critics, writers, architects, landscape architects, preservationists, and engineers, all of whom were asked to assess the meaning, significance, and impact of the upcoming 60th Anniversary of the passage of the NYC landmarks law, in a changing new New York.

In May 2015, she was appointed to the Advisory Board of the Gracie Mansion Conservancy by Mayor Bill de Blasio. In June 2015, she was named to the Advisory Committee of the National Eisenhower Memorial; the Memorial was designed by architect Frank Gehry, and is adjacent to the National Mall in Washington, D.C.

In 2016, Diamonstein-Spielvogel was appointed chairwoman of the New York State Council on the Arts. She was appointed to NYSCA in 2007, and served as the council's vice chair from 2013 to 2016. She served as NYSCA Chair and CEO until 2018.

In 2021, as Chair of the Diamonstein-Spielvogel Foundation, among its other programs, she worked with the Council on Foreign Relations to establish the Diamonstein-Spielvogel Project on the Future of Democracy. The Diamonstein-Spielvogel Project on the Future of Democracy is a multi-year global project, created to examine the state of democratic institutions around the world.

In 2023, Diamonstein-Spielvogel was appointed by New York State Governor Kathy Hochul to serve on the City University of New York's Board of Trustees, where she has been an instrumental figure serving as a member of the Board's Advancement and External Affairs Committee and the Subcommittee on Research and Innovation.

In 2025, New York State Governor Kathy Hochul appointed her a commissioner of the 250th anniversary, to commemorate the Semiquincentennial of our nation in 2026.

== Honors and awards ==
Diamonstein-Spielvogel has been the recipient of many honors and awards. Diamonstein-Spielvogel earned a masters degree with high honors and a doctorate degree with high honors from New York University. In 1994, Diamonstein-Spielvogel was the first woman to be honored with the Pratt Institute Founder's Award, and in 1995 was awarded the annual Visionary in the Arts' Award from the Museum of Contemporary Crafts/The Museum of Arts and Design in New York. In 1998, she was the recipient of the Ralph Menapace Award of the Friends of the Upper East Side Historic District. She also received the first Miami Beach Art Deco Preservation Award; was the first woman to be elected, in 2001, as an honorary member of PEN-Slovakia; and in 2003, received the Gen. Milan R. Stefanik Award for contributing to the advancement of public knowledge about the Slovak nation and people. In 2004, The Slovak Republic's Ministry of Foreign Affairs decorated her for "her remarkable personal contribution to the development of a civil society in Slovakia." In 2005, she was elected an Honorary Member of the American Institute of Architects, and was awarded the Humanitarian Award of the Jewish Women's Foundation in New York. In 2008, she received the Lifetime Achievement Award from Partners for Livable Places in Washington, D.C. In 2008, together with Murakami and Julian Schnabel, she was named a "Legend" by Pratt Institute.

In 2010, she received a lifetime achievement award by the Citizens Committee of New York. In October 2010, Duke University initiated the Diamonstein-Spielvogel Visiting Filmmaker Series to address significant contemporary topics of social, political, economic, and cultural urgency from a global perspective. And in 2015, she initiated the Diamonstein-Spielvogel Artist in Residence Program at Duke University, to provide an annual on-campus residency; in November 2016, she initiated a three-year pilot of the Sanford Innovator-in-Residence Program, also at Duke University.

In addition to her earned masters and doctorate with high honors from New York University, she is the recipient of four honorary doctorates from: the Maryland Institute College of Art in Baltimore, Maryland; Longwood University in Farmville, Virginia; Pratt Institute, in New York City, and SUNY-Purchase (2017). Diamonstein-Spielvogel received the Historic Districts Council's Landmarks Lion award in 2011 and the John Jay Medal for Service for lifetime contribution to the arts, architecture, and public policy from the Jay Heritage Center in 2012.

In November 2015, Dr. Diamonstein-Spielvogel was honored by the Historic Districts Council as one of the Pride of Landmark Lions recognized as part of the 50th Anniversary celebration of the New York City landmarks law, after previously receiving the group's Landmarks Lion award in 2011. In December of that year, she received the St. Nicholas Society Medal of Merit, and was also honored the same month by the New York Preservation Archive Project as the recipient of their inaugural Preservation Award. She served as Co-Chair of the King and Country Gala Benefit for the Brooklyn Academy of Music on April 3, 2016; on April 28, 2016, she received the New York Landmarks Conservancy's Lucy G. Moses Preservation Leadership Award, given to outstanding individuals in the field of historic preservation. On September 14, 2016, she received the Annual Preservation Award from the American Friends of the Georgian Group, and on November 19, 2016, was honored at the ArtsWestchester Gala "Celebrating Women".

She and her husband, Ambassador Carl Spielvogel, were honored by The Acting Company with The Joan Warburg Humanitarian Award on November 12, 2018, and by the Clarion Society, on March 5, 2019, for their leadership in the arts.

On October 22, 2019, Diamonstein-Spielvogel received the Ellen Stewart Centennial Medal, together with Philip Glass, given by the LaMama Theatre. On May 24, 2022, she was honored by St. Bartholomew's Conservancy at their Organ Concert, for her activist leadership in historic preservation. In January 2023, she was the recipient of the Dr. Jan Papanek Medal, one of the highest honors accorded by the government of the Slovak Republic, given to individuals who have contributed significantly to promoting values of freedom, democracy, and human rights, and as an appreciation of her long-term support of Slovakia and its active role within the United Nations.

In 2026, The Public Theater renamed the Anspacher Theater at its Astor Library Building as the Barbaralee Theater, in honor of Diamonstein-Spielvogel.

Her former husband Alan A. Diamonstein – they were married from 1956 to 1972 – had a distinguished career. A graduate of University of Virginia Law School, he became a trusted advisor and confidante to several Virginia Governors. He was appointed in 2005 to the University of Virginia Board of Visitors, and reappointed to a second term by Governor Tim Kaine. Diamonstein served as Chair of the Virginia Democratic Party from 1982 to 1985, and was elected as a representative for Newport News in the Virginia House of Delegates for 34 years, from 1968 to 2002.

Her late husband, Carl Spielvogel, was a leading international business executive with over 45 years of experience in the world of international trade, doing business in 55 countries. Active for forty years in the New York State Democratic Party, he also was Chairman of its board of trustees. Deeply committed to public service, he received many honors and awards. He served on numerous boards for publicly-owned companies, as well as for civic and cultural organizations, and was appointed by President Bill Clinton as U.S. Ambassador to Slovakia.

== Publications ==
Diamonstein-Spielvogel served as an interviewer/producer for seven television series about the arts, architecture, design, crafts, and public policy for the Arts & Entertainment Network, and other programs for national networks including CBS, NBC, WNET, Metromedia, WNYC Television, and major stations in Boston, Washington, Philadelphia, Los Angeles, Chicago, and Miami. Many of her television interviews, accompanied by photographs, were exhibited at the Leo Castelli Gallery, in three separate exhibitions during the 1980s, and more than 400 of her interviews and programs are available on YouTube, digitized by the Diamonstein-Spielvogel Video Archives at the David M. Rubenstein Rare Book & Manuscript Library at Duke University. As of August 2025, the Diamonstein-Spielvogel Video Archives also included forty-eight videos of Historic Landmarks Preservation Center Cultural Medallion dedications, seven videos of the Landmarks of New York Discussion Series, as well as twenty videos of artist interview/lecture programs at the National Gallery of Art, a series created by Dr. Diamonstein-Spielvogel. Seventy-two of her Oral History Interviews are also part of the Columbia University Oral History Project, and document conversations with many of the leading art world figures from 1972 to 1979.

Diamonstein-Spielvogel has also been a contributing author to publications including The New York Times, Vogue, Ladies Home Journal, Harper's Bazaar, the Partisan Review, The Saturday Review, Parade Magazine, Art News, and many others. In addition to her numerous articles, she wrote a monthly column on culture for Harper's Bazaar, and was the editor of two special Harper's Bazaar supplements—one on the decade of the 60s and the second, "94 Women in Touch with Our Time". The latter supplement became the basis of her first book (1972) entitled Open Secrets, in which 94 accomplished and professional women respond to questions about issues they face in the modern world.

She has also shared her combined experience and scholarship on art, architecture, photography, crafts, interior design, fashion, and public policy through her authorship of twenty-five books and numerous articles and essays. These publications included her work as the J. Clawson Mills fellow of the Architectural League, Collaborations: Artists and Architects, subsequently the subject of an important museum exhibit, which resuscitated this significant and long moribund relationship. They include as well, Inside New York's Art World: Conversations with Barbaralee Diamonstein (1979), a book of interviews with distinguished artists, museum directors, curators, collectors and dealers; Buildings Reborn: New Uses, Old Places (1978), an early examination of adaptive re-use; Interior Design (1982); American Architecture Now (1985); Fashion: The Inside Story (1988); Landmarks: Eighteen Wonders of the New York World (1992); Inside New York's Art World (1994); and Singular Voices: Conversations with Americans who Make a Difference (1997).

Her 1983 book Handmade in America: Conversations with fourteen Craftmasters (1983), was a carefully vetted series of interviews with crafts masters; discussions that defined crafts as art forms, rather than as simply products of technical expertise. As part of this project, she was the curator of an exhibition at the Renwick, and created the 1993 exhibition in the Clinton White House, the “White House Collection of American Crafts,” which traveled to 10 other museums through 1999. Her 2018 book entitled Notable New Yorkers: The HLPC Cultural Medallions Program, documents the three signage programs she created in New York City—historic district maps/markers, historic district street name signs, and cultural medallions. In 2025, Diamonstein-Spielvogel authored and edited Beyond Architecture: NEW New York, a collection of essays commissioned to celebrate the 60th Anniversary of the NYC Landmarks Law.

Among her other significant publications are the 1972 article in Ms. Magazine (newly-relevant and reprinted in January 2022) entitled "We have had abortions," a statement intended as a declaration of allegiance and sisterhood, to avoid stigma while fostering community. Other work related to her writing projects included a series of Forums for the publishing company McCall Corporation (1967-1968), which she initiated and convened. The Forums focussed on a number of important issues, such as current societal changes, politics, education, violence mitigation and the urban crisis. In addition, she was the editor of two special commemorative ARTNews editions: The Art World: Seventy-five Years of ARTNews (Rizzoli International, 1977) and The Museum of Modern Art at 50 (ARTNews, Volume 78, October 1979).

=== The Landmarks of New York, etc ===
Her book The Landmarks of New York, now in its Sixth Edition, contains detailed descriptions and photographs of individual, interior, and scenic landmarks and the historic districts and extensions that have been accorded landmark status by the New York City Landmarks Preservation Commission. Diamonstein-Spielvogel is the curator of several international traveling exhibitions, including one based on "The Landmarks of New York", which was circulated to 82 countries on 5 continents, in an unprecedented tour sponsored by the U.S. Department of State. A subsequent version of the publication, published by SUNY Press, was the source for another exhibit that traveled to sixteen venues in New York State, and has been permanently installed at the historic Conrad Duberstein Courthouse in Brooklyn, New York.
