= Moravany, Michalovce District =

Moravany Morva
- Municipality
- Flag

- Location of Moravany in the Košice Region Location of Moravany in Slovakia
- Coordinates: 48.73°N 21.78°E
- Country: Slovakia
- Region: Košice Region
- District: Michalovce District
- First mentioned: 1247

Area
  - Total: 16.66 km^{2} (6.43 sq mi)
- Elevation: 110 m (360 ft)

Population (2025)
  - Total: 1,055
- Time zone: UTC+1 (CET)
  - Summer (DST): UTC+2 (CEST)
- Postal code: 720 3
- Area code: +421 56
- Vehicle registration plate (until 2022): MI
- Website: www.obecmoravany.sk

Moravany (Hungarian: Morva) is a village and large municipality in Michalovce District in the Kosice Region of eastern Slovakia.

== History ==
In historical records the village was first mentioned in 1247.

== Geography ==
The municipality lies at an altitude of 110 metres (360 ft) and covers an area of 16.66 km^{2} (6.43 sq mi) (2025).

== Population ==
Population statistic (10 years)
Year	1995	2005	2015	2025
Count	1032	1041	1034	1055
Difference		+0.87%	−0.67%	+2.03%

Population statistic
Year	2024	2025
Count	1034	1055
Difference		+2.03%

It has a population of 1055 people (31 December 2025).

=== Ethnicity ===
Census 2021 (1+ %)
Ethnicity	Number	Fraction
Slovak	999	96.89%
Not found out	25	2.42%
Total	1031	

In year 2021 was 1031 people by ethnicity 999 as Slovak, 25 as Not found out, 6 as Rusyn, 3 as Czech, 2 as Greek, 1 as Silesian, 1 as Romani, 1 as Polish and 1 as Other.

Note on population: The difference values of population numbers in the table "Population statistic" and in the sections "Ethnicity" & "Religion" is caused by the use of various statistical methods.

=== Religion ===
Census 2021 (1+ %)
Religion	Number	Fraction
Roman Catholic Church	620	60.14%
Greek Catholic Church	206	19.98%
None	94	9.12%
Evangelical Church	47	4.56%
Not found out	28	2.72%
Calvinist Church	26	2.52%
Total	1031	

In year 2021 was 1031 people by religion 620 from Roman Catholic Church, 206 from Greek Catholic Church, 94 from None, 47 from Evangelical Church, 28 from Not found out, 26 from Calvinist Church, 4 from Eastern Orthodox Church, 2 from Jehovah's Witnesses, 2 from Christian Congregations in Slovakia, 1 from Other and not ascertained christian church and 1 from Church of the Brethren.

== Famous people ==
- Dušan Rapoš, film director
- Vincent Obsitnik, United States ambassador to Slovakia
