= Theodore E. Russell =

American diplomat (born 1936)

United States Ambassador to Slovakia
- In office November 22, 1993 – March 29, 1996
- Preceded by: New creation
- Succeeded by: Ralph R. Johnson

Personal details
- Born: 1936 (age 89–90)
- Education: Yale University (B.A.); Tufts University (M.A.L.D.); National War College

Theodore E. Russell (born 1936) was the first U.S. ambassador to Slovakia (1993–1996). He subsequently served as deputy commandant for international affairs at the U.S. Army War College in Carlisle, Pennsylvania.

== Career ==
His career has included service in East and West Europe, as deputy director for European regional political and economic affairs in the State Department and deputy assistant administrator for international activities at the Environmental Protection Agency. Since his retirement from the Foreign Service, Russell has served as a political-military affairs consultant for a number of military training exercises involving the Balkans, Far East, Middle East, and South Asia. For several years, he was also associated with an independent public television network where he served as international relations director. He has lectured on U.S. foreign policy in Central Europe and contributed to CSIS studies on NATO enlargement and on Slovakia's security and foreign policy strategy. He is a founding chairman of Friends of Slovakia.

== Personal ==
Russell holds a B.A. in history from Yale, an M.A.L.D degree from the Fletcher School of Law and Diplomacy at Tufts University, and is a graduate of the National War College.

Diplomatic posts
Preceded by post created	United States Ambassador to Slovakia; 1993–1996	Succeeded by Ralph R. Johnson
