= Paul Hacker (diplomat) =

Former diplomat and a writer

Chargé d'affaires ad interim, United States Embassy to Slovakia
- In office January 1, 1993 – July 7, 1993
- Succeeded by: Eleanor Sutter

Consul General, United States to Bratislava
- In office 1990–1992

Personal details
- Born: 1946 New York City
- Education: Columbia University; City College of New York

Paul Hacker (born 1946) is a former diplomat and American author, who served as the first U.S. Chief of Mission to Slovakia after diplomatic relations of the two countries established in 1993. He was in charge of the founding of the embassy in the Slovak capital of Bratislava. He had also temporarily headed the Consulate General in Guangzhou, China in 2000.

== Career ==
After joining the Foreign Service in 1973, Hacker held overseas assignments at Embassy Stockholm, Sofia, Nicosia, Manila and Helsinki.

From 1990 to 1992, Hacker was assigned to the former Czechoslovakia to serve as Consul General to the Slovakian city of Bratislava. Experiencing the Velvet Divorce in 1993, resulting in the independence of Slovak Republic and Czech Republic respectively, he was in charge of the U.S. effort to establish an embassy at Bratislava, turning it into a self-run mission from the U.S. Embassy in Prague. From January 4, 1993, he served as the embassy's first chief of mission (Chargés d'affaires ad interim) until July 7, when Eleanor Sutter assumed charge of the post.

Going back to the U.S. after his tenure in Slovakia in 1993, Hacker taught at the Air Command and Staff College (ACSC) at Maxwell Air Force Base, Alabama. He had once worked for the Office of High Representative for Bosnia and Herzegovina (OHR) under Carl Bildt (later Prime Minister of Sweden) after the end of the Bosnian War, and was stationed at Tuzla.

In 1999, he took up his post at the U.S. Consulate General Guangzhou as Economic Section Chief, Deputy Principal Officer, and acting Consul General until 2000, when John J. Norris assumed his office as the new Consul General there. He then served as a Cultural Officer at the U.S. Embassy Kyiv, retiring from the foreign service in 2003. After his retirement, he has worked as translator and editor from Finnish, Swedish, Czech, Slovak, Polish, and Russian. He also taught a course on diplomacy in 1994 at the Florida International University (FIU) in Miami and also one course on the same subject in 2003 at the Kyiv Mohyla Academy [College].

== Personal ==
Born in New York City, Paul Hacker graduated from City College of New York and the Columbia University (with a PhD degree in political science in 1976). He is the author of Slovakia on the Road to Independence: An American Diplomat's Eyewitness Account (2010), a book in which he provides a first-hand account of his experience at the crucial period of Slovak history toward independence and its diplomatic relations with the United States. His memoirs were translated into Slovak in 2014 entitled "Slovensko 1990-1993." (translated by Dr. Eva Salnerová), Artforum 2014: Bratislava.
