= Peter Burian =

Slovak diplomat (born 1959)

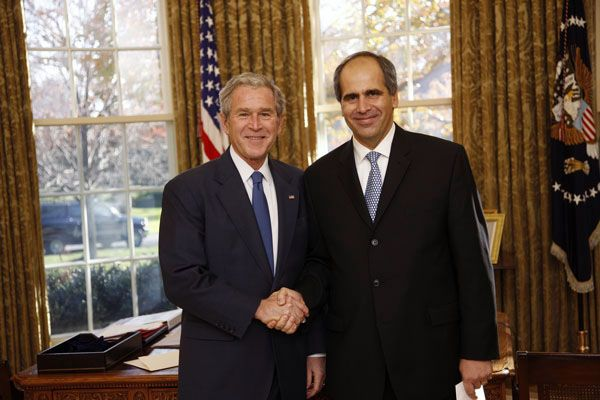
Ambassador Peter Burian with President Bush after presenting his credentials December 3, 2008

Peter Burian (born 21 March 1959) is a Slovak diplomat and the Ambassador at large for human rights.

Born in Hlohovec, Slovakia, Peter Burian graduated in Oriental Studies at St. Petersburg University in the USSR and entered the service of the Czechoslovak foreign ministry in 1983. Following the breakup of Czechoslovakia on 1 January 1993, he was appointed chargé d'affaires at the newly independent Slovakia's embassy in Washington, D.C., and, shortly after, deputy chief of mission. In 1999, he became the Slovak Ambassador to NATO, based in Brussels, Belgium. He was also Slovakia's permanent representative to the UN from 22 December 2004 to November 2008 and sat on the Security Council when Slovakia was a Member (being the Security Council President for the month of February 2007). He became the Slovak Ambassador to the US in December 2008. He also served as the State Secretary at the Slovak Ministry of Foreign Affairs.
