= Adam H. Sterling =

American diplomat (born 1960)

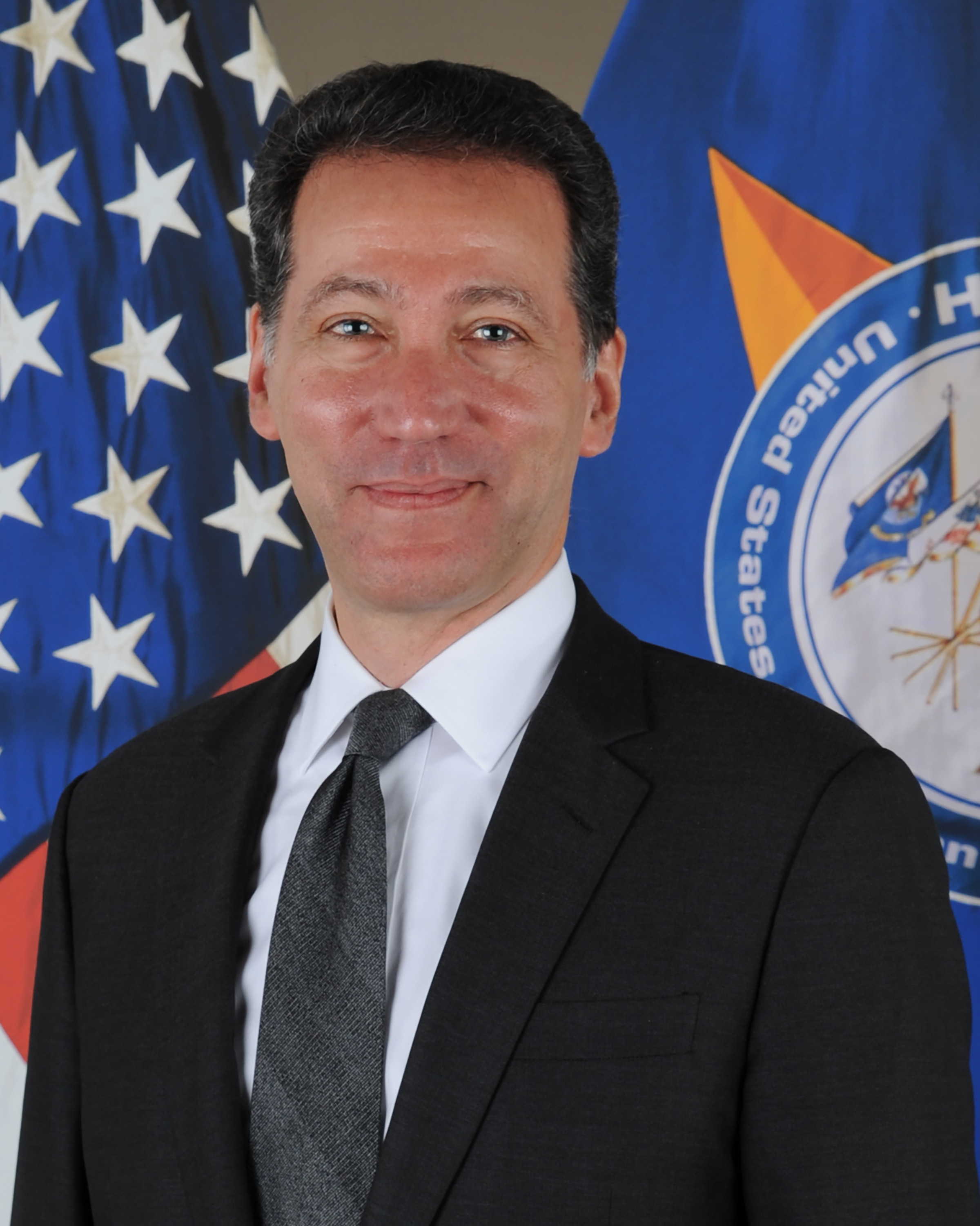

United States Ambassador to Slovakia
- In office September 6, 2016 – August 7, 2019
- Preceded by: Liam Wasley (acting)
- Succeeded by: Bridget Brink

Personal details
- Born: 1960 (age 65–66)
- Education: Grinnell College (BA); Harvard University (MPP)

Adam H. Sterling (born 1960) is a retired American diplomat. He previously served as the Ambassador to Slovakia from September 2016 to August 2019.

== Biography ==
=== Education ===
Sterling earned a Master of Public Policy degree from the John F. Kennedy School of Government at Harvard University and a Bachelor’s degree from Grinnell College.

=== Career ===
Sterling joined the Foreign Service in 1990 after working as a liaison to the United Nations for the Mayor of New York City. His initial diplomatic posts include Peru from 1991 to 1993 and Belgium from 1993 to 1995. Later, he returned to America as a desk officer in the Office of Central Asian Affairs from 1995 to 1997. Then, Sterling completed two tours as a political officer in Kazakhstan from 1998 to 2001 and Israel from 2001 to 2005. After his overseas tours, Sterling served as a Special Assistant to the Assistant Secretary of State for European and Eurasian Affairs from 2005 to 2006. Next, he served as the Director for Central and Eastern European Affairs on the National Security Council staff from 2006 to 2009. Posting back overseas, Sterling served as the Deputy Chief of Mission and twice as Chargé d'affaires in Azerbaijan from 2010 to 2013. Next, he served as Deputy Chief of Mission and twice as Chargé d'affaires in the Netherlands from 2013 to 2016. He was the Ambassador to Slovakia from May 2016 to August 2019.

Most recently, Sterling was the Civilian Deputy and Foreign Policy Advisor to the Commander of the US European Command from 2019 to 2022.

=== Personal life ===
Sterling grew up in New York City and Lawrence, Kansas. He is married and has two adult children.

Diplomatic posts
Preceded by Liam Wasley	United States Ambassador to Slovakia; 2016–2019	Succeeded by Bridget A. Brink
