= Embassy of Slovakia, Washington, D.C. =

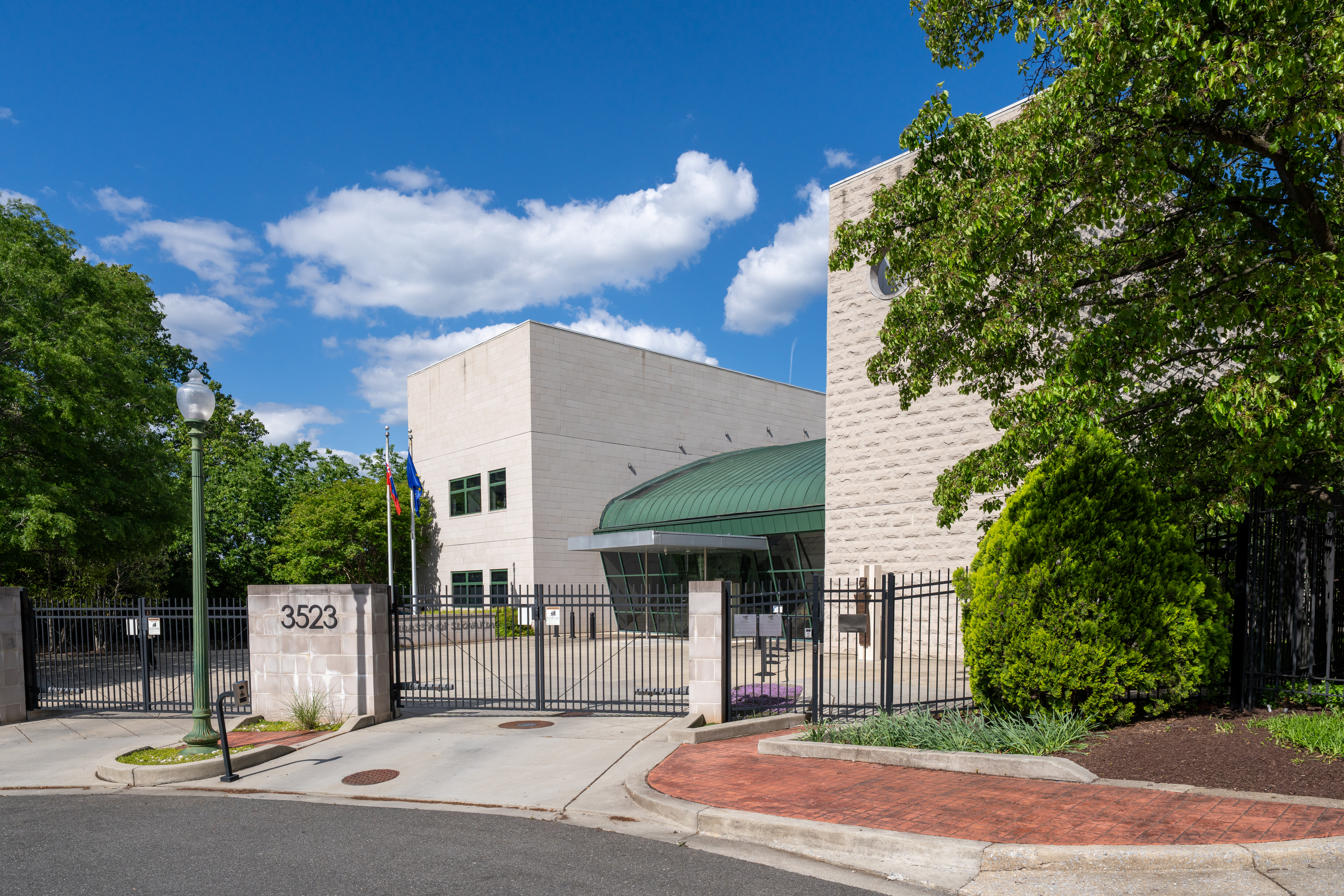
- Location: Washington, D.C.
- Address: 3523 International Court, N.W.
- Coordinates: 38°56′43.9″N 77°4′5.2″W
- Ambassador: Andrej Droba

The Slovak Embassy in Washington, D.C. is the main diplomatic mission of Slovak Republic to the United States.

It is located at 3523 International Court NW in Washington, D.C.

The Ambassador is Andrej Droba.
