= Saradzhev =

Saradzhev (Russian: Сараджев) is a Russian masculine surname, a derivative of the Armenian surname Saradzhian; its feminine counterpart is Saradzheva. The surname may refer to

- Konstantin Saradzhev (born Saradzhian; 1877–1954), Armenian conductor and violinist
- Konstantin Konstantinovich Saradzhev (1900–1942), Russian composer and musical theorist, son of Konstantin Saradzhev
