= Malcolm Toon =

American diplomat

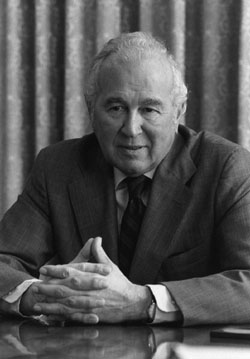

15th United States Ambassador to the Soviet Union
- In office January 18, 1977 – October 16, 1979
- President: Gerald Ford; Jimmy Carter
- Preceded by: Walter John Stoessel Jr.
- Succeeded by: Thomas J. Watson Jr.

United States Ambassador to Israel
- In office July 10, 1975 – December 27, 1976
- President: Gerald Ford
- Preceded by: Kenneth B. Keating
- Succeeded by: Samuel W. Lewis

United States Ambassador to Yugoslavia
- In office October 23, 1971 – March 11, 1975
- President: Richard Nixon; Gerald Ford
- Preceded by: William K. Leonhart
- Succeeded by: Laurence H. Silberman

United States Ambassador to Czechoslovakia
- In office July 31, 1969 – October 11, 1971
- President: Richard Nixon
- Preceded by: Jacob D. Beam
- Succeeded by: Albert W. Sherer, Jr.

Personal details
- Born: July 4, 1916 Troy, New York, U.S.
- Died: February 12, 2009 (aged 92) Pinehurst, North Carolina, U.S.
- Spouse: Elizabeth Jane Taylor (died 1996)
- Children: 3
- Education: Tufts University (BA, MA)

Malcolm Toon (July 4, 1916 – February 12, 2009) was an American diplomat who served as a Foreign Service Officer in Moscow in the 1950s, 1960s, and 1970s, during the Cold War, ultimately becoming the ambassador to the Soviet Union.

== Life ==
Toon was born July 4, 1916, in Troy, New York, where his father was a stonecutter, shortly after his parents had emigrated from Scotland. The family returned to Scotland when he was 6, before then resettling in Northborough, Massachusetts. Toon received an A. B. Degree from Tufts University in 1937, and an M.A. degree from the Fletcher School of Law and Diplomacy of Tufts University in 1938. He served in the United States Navy from 1942 to 1946. In the Pacific Ocean theater of World War II, he was a PT boat skipper, and received the Bronze Star Medal for valor.

A resident of Southern Pines, North Carolina, Toon was married to Elizabeth Jane Taylor until her death in 1996. They are interred at Arlington National Cemetery. Toon died at a hospital in Pinehurst, North Carolina, on February 12, 2009, aged 92. His death was reported in local media and mentioned by the Foreign Service Journal at the time, but was not reported in national news, despite his prominence as a diplomat. The New York Times said it never received any word of his death in 2009, and the paper's obituary for Toon, which was prepared around 2006, was not published until 2017.

== Career ==
After the war, Toon joined the United States Foreign Service, receiving postings in Poland, Haiti, and Hungary, before being trained in the Russian language at the Embassy of the United States, Moscow in the 1950s.

In 1965, Toon had become the U.S. embassy's third-ranking official when the Russians made accusations that was running a spy ring, which were officially denied, and he was not expelled. He then became the head of the State Department's Soviet Affairs office.

Toon was the ambassador to Czechoslovakia from 1969 to 1971, Yugoslavia from 1971 to 1975, Israel from 1975 to 1976, and the Soviet Union from 1977 to 1979.

He participated in SALT II talks from 1977 to 1979 and the American-Soviet Summit in Vienna in 1979. At the summit, Toon learned that President Jimmy Carter had chosen Thomas Watson Jr., a business executive, as his replacement, leading Toon to publicly criticize making ambassadors out of those without any State Department experience. Secretary of State Cyrus Vance then negotiated SALT II with Soviet Ambassador Anatoly Dobrynin without Toon, causing an upset Toon to publicly question the agreement's verification procedure. President Carter signed the treaty but when Soviet-American relations deteriorated he withdrew it from consideration by the U.S. Senate.

In the 1990s, Toon co-chaired the U.S.–Russia Joint Commission on POW/MIAs with Russian general Dmitri Volkogonov. An article about Toon's briefing of the U.S. press corps in Moscow 1977–1979 was published in the Foreign Service Journal in June 2011.

Diplomatic posts
Preceded by Jacob D. Beam	United States ambassador to Czechoslovakia; 1969–1971	Succeeded by Albert W. Sherer, Jr.
Preceded by William K. Leonhart	United States ambassador to Yugoslavia; 1971–1975	Succeeded by Laurence H. Silberman
Preceded by Kenneth B. Keating	United States ambassador to Israel; 1975–1976	Succeeded by Samuel W. Lewis
Preceded by Walter John Stoessel, Jr.	United States ambassador to the Soviet Union; 1977–1979	Succeeded by Thomas J. Watson, Jr.
