= Jacob D. Beam =

American diplomat

United States Ambassador to Poland
- In office August 9, 1957 – November 30, 1961
- President: Dwight D. Eisenhower; John F. Kennedy
- Preceded by: Joseph E. Jacobs
- Succeeded by: John Moors Cabot

United States Ambassador to Czechoslovakia
- In office August 31, 1966 – March 5, 1969
- President: Lyndon Johnson; Richard Nixon
- Preceded by: Outerbridge Horsey
- Succeeded by: Malcolm Toon

United States Ambassador to the Soviet Union
- In office April 18, 1969 – January 24, 1973
- President: Richard Nixon
- Preceded by: Llewellyn Thompson
- Succeeded by: Walter J. Stoessel, Jr.

Personal details
- Born: Jacob Dyneley Beam; March 24, 1908 Princeton, New Jersey, U.S.
- Died: August 16, 1993 (aged 85) Rockville, Maryland, U.S.

Jacob Dyneley Beam (March 24, 1908 – August 16, 1993) was an American diplomat.

== Life and career ==
Beam was born in Princeton, New Jersey. His father was a German professor at Princeton University, and the younger Beam earned a bachelor's degree in 1929 from Princeton before he joined the US Foreign Service.

His first assignment was in Geneva, where he monitored the League of Nations and served as vice counsel in Geneva from 1931 to 1934. He then moved to Berlin and served as third secretary to the US embassy from 1934 to 1940. During World War II, he served as second secretary of the embassy in London. He returned to Germany after the war.

Beam was counselor to the US embassy in Indonesia from 1949 to 1951 and to Yugoslavia from 1951 to 1952. He became the ambassador to Poland from 1957 to 1961. From 1966 to 1969 he served as Ambassador to Czechoslovakia, where he was present at the Prague Spring. He was ambassador to the Soviet Union from 1969 to 1973.

Beam's support of Senator Edmund Muskie's visit to Moscow in January 1971 caused President Richard Nixon to remark at a meeting with Henry Kissinger and HR Haldeman to give Beam three more months in the role as ambassador to Moscow and then fire him.

Beam died in Rockville, Maryland, of a stroke. His son is journalist Alex Beam.

Diplomatic posts
Preceded by Joseph E. Jacobs	United States Ambassador to Poland; August 9, 1957 – November 30, 1961	Succeeded by John M. Cabot
Preceded by Outerbridge Horsey	United States Ambassador to Czechoslovakia; August 31, 1966 – March 5, 1969	Succeeded by Malcolm Toon
Preceded by Llewellyn Thompson	United States Ambassador to the Soviet Union; April 18, 1969 – January 24, 1973	Succeeded by Walter J. Stoessel, Jr.
