= List of ambassadors of the United States to Czechoslovakia =

Ambassador of the United States to Czechoslovakia
- Seal of the United States Department of State
- Nominator: The president of the United States
- Inaugural holder: Richard Crane as Envoy Extraordinary and Minister Plenipotentiary
- Formation: April 23, 1919
- Final holder: Adrian A. Basora
- Abolished: December 31, 1992
- Succession: United States Ambassador to the Czech Republic; United States Ambassador to Slovakia

Following the dissolution of the Austro-Hungarian Empire in 1918 at the end of World War I, the Czechs and Slovaks united to form the new nation of Czechoslovakia. The United States recognized Czechoslovakia and commissioned its first ambassador on April 23, 1919.

Nazi Germany invaded Czechoslovakia in March 1939, establishing a German "protectorate", the Protectorate of Bohemia and Moravia. By this time, Slovakia had already declared independence and had become a puppet state of Germany, the Slovak Republic. German forces occupied Prague on March 15, 1939. The U.S. embassy was closed on March 21, 1939 and the ambassador left his post on April 6, 1939.

During World War II the U.S. maintained diplomatic relations with the Czechoslovak government-in-exile in London. Ambassador Anthony J. Biddle, Jr. established an embassy in London on September 17, 1941 and the embassy was maintained until the end of World War II in Europe. Following the war the embassy in Prague was reopened on May 29, 1945.

In June 1992, the Slovak parliament voted to declare sovereignty and the Czech-Slovak federation dissolved peacefully on January 1, 1993. The United States recognized the Czech Republic and Slovakia as independent nations and moved to establish diplomatic relations. The previous ambassador to Czechoslovakia, Adrian A. Basora, continued as the ambassador to the Czech Republic. Paul Hacker, the incumbent U.S. consul general, served as the first chargé d'affaires of the U.S. Embassy in Slovakia (January 1 to July 7, 1993), followed by Eleanor Sutter. In November 1993, Theodore E. Russell, former deputy chief of mission in Prague, became the first U.S. ambassador to Slovakia.

== Ambassadors ==
- Richard Crane – Political appointee
  - Title: Envoy Extraordinary and Minister Plenipotentiary
  - Appointed: April 23, 1919
  - Presented credentials: June 11, 1919
  - Terminated mission: December 5, 1921
- Lewis Einstein – Political appointee
  - Title: Envoy Extraordinary and Minister Plenipotentiary
  - Appointed: October 8, 1921
  - Presented credentials: December 20, 1921
  - Terminated mission: Left post, February 1, 1930
- Abraham C. Ratshesky – Political appointee
  - Title: Envoy Extraordinary and Minister Plenipotentiary
  - Appointed: January 25, 1930
  - Presented credentials: May 2, 1930
  - Terminated mission: Left post, May 13, 1932
- Henry Frank Holthusen – Political appointee
  - Title: Envoy Extraordinary and Minister Plenipotentiary
  - Appointed:
  - Presented credentials:
  - Terminated mission:
- Francis White – Career FSO
  - Title: Envoy Extraordinary and Minister Plenipotentiary
  - Appointed: June 13, 1933
  - Presented credentials: September 7, 1933
  - Terminated mission: Relinquished charge on November 30, 1933
- J. Butler Wright – Career FSO
  - Title: Envoy Extraordinary and Minister Plenipotentiary
  - Appointed: March 9, 1934
  - Presented credentials: October 25, 1934
  - Terminated mission: Left post, June 1, 1937
- Wilbur J. Carr – Political appointee
  - Title: Envoy Extraordinary and Minister Plenipotentiary
  - Appointed: July 13, 1937
  - Presented credentials: September 16, 1937
  - Terminated mission: April 6, 1939
- Note: The embassy in Prague was closed on March 21, 1939, following the occupation of Prague by German forces on March 15. The U.S. opened an embassy in London and maintained diplomatic relations with the government-in-exile of Czechoslovakia during the war.
- Anthony J. Biddle, Jr. – Political appointee
  - Title: Envoy Extraordinary and Minister Plenipotentiary
  - Appointed: September 17, 1941
  - Presented credentials: October 28, 1941
  - Terminated mission: June 4, 1943
- Note: The title of the commission was changed to Ambassador Extraordinary and Plenipotentiary in 1943. This required a new commission for the ambassador.
- Anthony J. Biddle, Jr. – Political appointee
  - Title: Ambassador Extraordinary and Plenipotentiary
  - Appointed: June 4, 1943
  - Presented credentials: July 12, 1943
  - Terminated mission: Left London on December 1, 1943
- Note: After Germany’s surrender at the close of WWII in Europe, the mission of the embassy in London was terminated. Rudolph E. Schoenfeld was serving as chargé d'affaires ad interim when the embassy was closed.
- Note: The embassy in Prague was re-established on May 29, 1945, with Alfred W. Klieforth as chargé d'affaires ad interim.
- Laurence A. Steinhardt – Political appointee
  - Title: Ambassador Extraordinary and Plenipotentiary
  - Appointed: December 20, 1944
  - Presented credentials: July 20, 1945
  - Terminated mission: Left post, September 19, 1948
- Joseph E. Jacobs – Career FSO
  - Title: Ambassador Extraordinary and Plenipotentiary
  - Appointed: October 15, 1948
  - Presented credentials: January 5, 1949
  - Terminated mission: Left post, October 12, 1949
- Ellis O. Briggs – Career FSO
  - Title: Ambassador Extraordinary and Plenipotentiary
  - Appointed: September 1, 1949
  - Presented credentials: November 8, 1949
  - Terminated mission: Left post, August 27, 1952
- George Wadsworth – Career FSO
  - Title: Ambassador Extraordinary and Plenipotentiary
  - Appointed: October 8, 1952
  - Presented credentials: December 29, 1952
  - Terminated mission: Left post, October 30, 1953
- U. Alexis Johnson – Career FSO
  - Title: Ambassador Extraordinary and Plenipotentiary
  - Appointed: November 10, 1953
  - Presented credentials: December 31, 1953
  - Terminated mission: Left post, December 29, 1957
- John M. Allison – Career FSO
  - Title: Ambassador Extraordinary and Plenipotentiary
  - Appointed: March 12, 1958
  - Presented credentials: April 24, 1958
  - Terminated mission: Relinquished charge on May 4, 1960
- Christian M. Ravndal – Career FSO
  - Title: Ambassador Extraordinary and Plenipotentiary
  - Appointed: July 21, 1960
  - Presented credentials: September 16, 1960
  - Terminated mission: Left post, May 6, 1961
- Note: After 1961 the succeeding ambassadors were commissioned to the Czechoslovak Socialist Republic.
- Edward T. Wailes – Career FSO
  - Title: Ambassador Extraordinary and Plenipotentiary
  - Appointed: July 14, 1961
  - Presented credentials: July 28, 1961
  - Terminated mission: Left post, October 22, 1962
- Outerbridge Horsey – Career FSO
  - Title: Ambassador Extraordinary and Plenipotentiary
  - Appointed: November 14, 1962
  - Presented credentials: January 3, 1963
  - Terminated mission: Relinquished charge on August 1, 1966
- Jacob D. Beam – Career FSO
  - Title: Ambassador Extraordinary and Plenipotentiary
  - Appointed: May 27, 1966
  - Presented credentials: August 31, 1966
  - Terminated mission: Left post, March 5, 1969
- Malcolm Toon – Career FSO
  - Title: Ambassador Extraordinary and Plenipotentiary
  - Appointed: May 13, 1969
  - Presented credentials: July 31, 1969
  - Terminated mission: Left post, October 11, 1971
- Albert W. Sherer, Jr. – Career FSO
  - Title: Ambassador Extraordinary and Plenipotentiary
  - Appointed: February 15, 1972
  - Presented credentials: March 15, 1972
  - Terminated mission: Left post, July 29, 1975
- Thomas Ryan Byrne – Career FSO
  - Title: Ambassador Extraordinary and Plenipotentiary
  - Appointed: May 1, 1976
  - Presented credentials: June 23, 1976
  - Terminated mission: Left post, November 15, 1978
- Francis J. Meehan – Career FSO
  - Title: Ambassador Extraordinary and Plenipotentiary
  - Appointed: March 23, 1979
  - Presented credentials: May 30, 1979
  - Terminated mission: Left post, October 20, 1980
- Jack F. Matlock, Jr. – Career FSO
  - Title: Ambassador Extraordinary and Plenipotentiary
  - Appointed: September 28, 1981
  - Presented credentials: November 11, 1981
  - Terminated mission: September 20, 1983
- William H. Luers – Career FSO
  - Title: Ambassador Extraordinary and Plenipotentiary
  - Appointed: November 14, 1983
  - Presented credentials: December 29, 1983
  - Terminated mission: Left post, March 11, 1986
- Julian Niemczyk – Political appointee
  - Title: Ambassador Extraordinary and Plenipotentiary
  - Appointed: August 18, 1986
  - Presented credentials: October 2, 1986
  - Terminated mission: Left post, July 7, 1989
- Shirley Temple Black – Political appointee
  - Title: Ambassador Extraordinary and Plenipotentiary
  - Appointed: August 3, 1989
  - Presented credentials: August 23, 1989
  - Terminated mission: Left post, July 12, 1992
- Adrian A. Basora – Career FSO
  - Title: Ambassador Extraordinary and Plenipotentiary
  - Appointed: June 15, 1992
  - Presented credentials: July 20, 1992
  - Terminated mission: December 31, 1992
- Note: The Czech and Slovak Federal Republic ceased to exist on December 31, 1992. For later ambassadors, see United States Ambassador to the Czech Republic and United States Ambassador to Slovakia.

== See also ==
- Ambassadors from the United States
- United States Ambassador to the Czech Republic
- United States Ambassador to Slovakia

== Sources ==
- United States Department of State: Ambassadors to Czechoslovakia
- United States Department of State: Background notes on the Czech Republic
