= Lewis Einstein =

American diplomat and historian

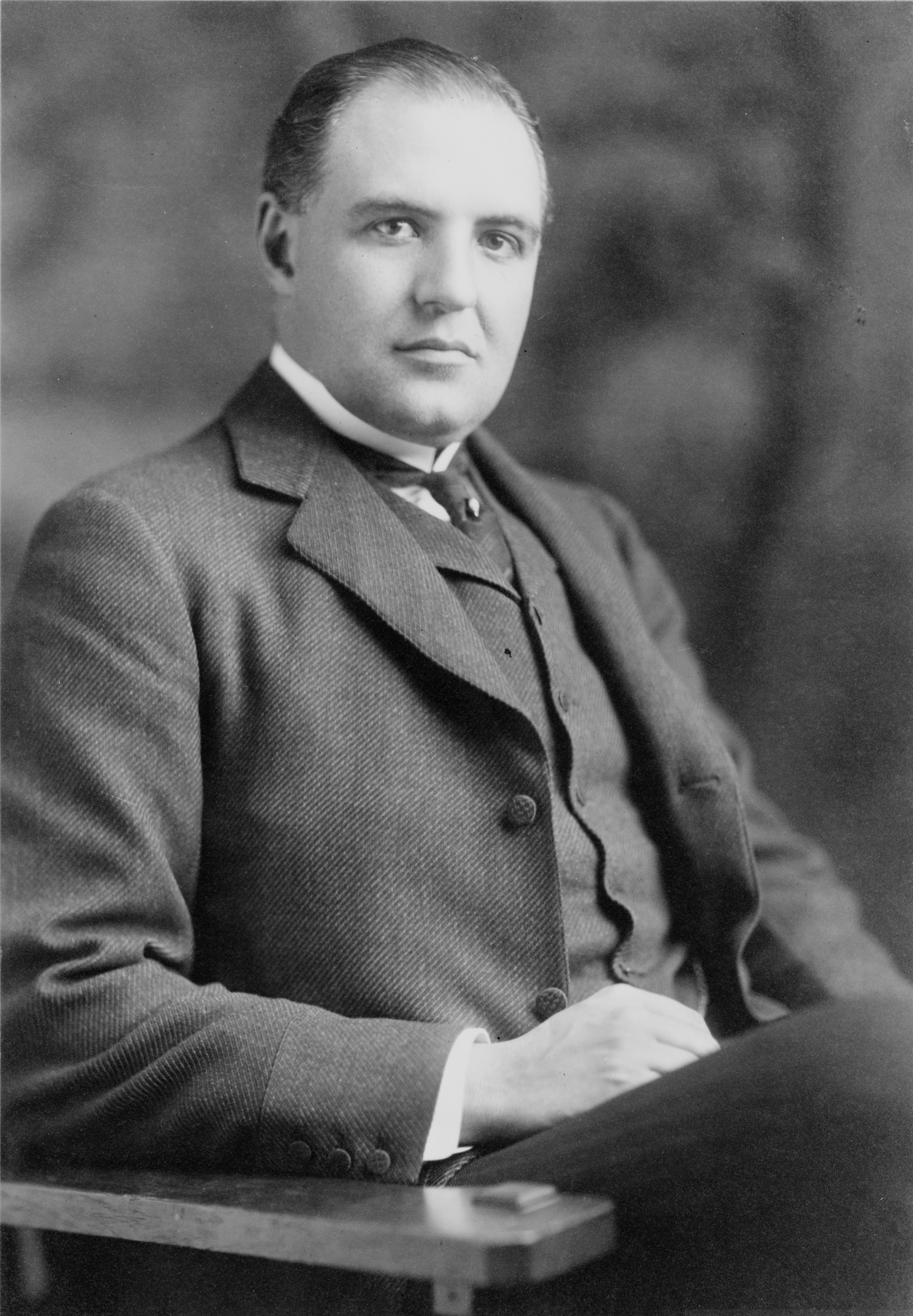
- Lewis Einstein in 1912

U.S. Minister to Czechoslovakia
- In office December 20, 1921 – February 1, 1930
- President: Warren Harding
- Preceded by: Richard Crane
- Succeeded by: Abraham C. Ratshesky

U.S. Minister to Costa Rica
- In office November 3, 1911 – December 29, 1911
- President: William H. Taft
- Preceded by: William L. Merry
- Succeeded by: Edward J. Hale

Personal details
- Born: Lewis David Einstein; March 15, 1877 New York City, U.S.
- Died: December 4, 1967 (aged 90) Paris, France
- Resting place: Cimitero Evangelico degli Allori; Florence; Italy
- Spouses: Helen Ralli (m. 1904; died 1949) Camilla Hare Lippincott (after 1950)
- Relations: Stephen J. Spingarn (nephew); Henry Walston, Baron Walston (nephew)
- Education: Columbia University

Lewis David Einstein (March 15, 1877 – December 4, 1967) was an American diplomat, historian аnd art collector.

== Early life ==
Einstein was born to a Jewish family March 15, 1877, in New York City. He was the only son of wool magnate David Lewis Einstein (1839–1909) and, his wife, Caroline (née Fatman) Einstein (1852–1910). Lewis had two sisters: Amy Einstein, who married Joel Elias Spingarn, and Florence Einstein, who married Sir Charles Waldstein.

Among his family was uncle, Henry L. Einstein, the proprietor of The New York Press, and Judah P. Benjamin, a U.S. Senator from Louisiana who served as the Confederate States Attorney General, Secretary of War, and Secretary of State.

Einstein graduated from Columbia University Bachelor of Arts June 11, 1898, and earned a Master of Arts there, June 7, 1899.

== Career ==
Einstein's diplomatic career began in 1903, when he was appointed as Third Secretary of Legation at Constantinople. Einstein advanced from Second Secretary to First Secretary and then Charge d'Affairs during the Young Turk Revolution of 1908, remaining in Constantinople despite the hostilities.

=== U.S. Ambassador to Costa Rica ===
For one month in 1911, he served as United States Ambassador to Costa Rica (having been appointed by President William H. Taft) before his wife's ill health in the country's high altitude forced him to leave the post.

=== Writings before the First World War ===
In the winter 1912/13, he published anonymously the article "The Anglo-German Rivalry and the United States". in the British magazine The National Review, in which he warned of a coming war between Germany and Britain, claiming that "unperceived by many Americans, the European balance of power is a political necessity which can alone sanction on the Western Hemisphere the continuance of an economic development unhandicapped by the burden of extensive armaments" and that "if ever decisive results are about to be registered of a nature calculated to upset what has for centuries been the recognized political fabric of Europe, America can remain indifferent thereto only at its own eventual cost. If it then neglects to observe that the interests of the nations crushed are likewise its own, America will be guilty of political blindness which it will later rue."

In November 1914, when the First World War was already raging, he published a second article "The War and American Policy" in the same publication. Both articles were in early 1918 reprinted as a book with a foreword by Theodore Roosevelt

=== U.S. Special Agent at Constantinople ===
He returned to Constantinople in 1915, and wrote his diaries which would be later published under the name Inside Constantinople: A Diplomatist's Diary During the Dardanelles Expedition, April–September, 1915. Einstein kept the diary from the months of April to September, covering the Entente's campaign to conquer the capital city of the Ottoman Empire starting with a landing on the northern shore of the Dardanelles, which went in the history as the defeat of the Gallipoli Campaign (Gelibolu in modern Turkish).

Einstein also paid special attention to the massacres of Armenians and wrote about it extensively throughout the diary. He described the events and stated that "the policy of murder then carried out was planned in the coldest blood" in the preface of his diary. Einstein blamed the cooperative pact between Germany and the Ottoman Empire as the supportive and responsible agents behind the massacres.

He also pointed out that the stockpiles of armaments that was used as a justification for the arrests was in fact a "myth". By August 4, Einstein wrote in a diary entry that the "persecution of Armenians is assuming unprecedented proportions, and is carried out with nauseating thoroughness." He kept in contact with both Enver and Talat and tried to persuade them to reverse their policy towards the Armenians. In a diary entry, he states that Talat insisted that the Armenians sided with the enemies and that Enver believed the policy was out of military necessity, but in reality both leaders feared the Armenians.

=== U.S. Special Agent at Sofia, Bulgaria with rank of Chargé d’Affaires ===
Einstein served as the United States Diplomatic Representative (Chargé d'Affaires), with responsibility for looking after British interests, in Sofia, Bulgaria from October 1915 to June 1916. He provided asylum in his hotel rooms and prevented the arrest of the British vice consul. He also succeeded in "a game of hide and seek" with the authorities to get considerable improvement in the treatment and the condition of British prisoners of war.

=== U.S. Minister to Czechoslovakia ===
On October 8, 1921, Warren Harding appointed Einstein to replace Richard Crane as the United States Envoy Extraordinary and Minister Plenipotentiary to Czechoslovakia. He was recommended by Senators Wadsworth and William M. Calder. He presented his credentials on December 20, 1921, and held the position until he left his post on February 1, 1930.

He was also a member of the Council on Foreign Relations.

== Personal life ==
In 1904, he married Helen (née Carew) Ralli (1863–1949), a noted Anglo-Greek beauty who was fourteen years older than him. Helen was a daughter of Robert Russell Carew and her sister, Jessica Philippa Carew, was married to Francis Stonor, 4th Baron Camoys. This marriage led to friction between Einstein and his father, who worried that Ralli would damage the younger Einstein's career; Ralli was twice a divorcee (including to Alexander Ralli), and divorced women could not be received in some European courts. From his wife's marriage to Ralli, she was the mother of Marguerite Christine Ralli, who later married William Hay, 11th Marquess of Tweeddale, becoming the Marchioness of Tweeddale.

Einstein was disinherited by his father after marrying Ralli, except for a sum of $125,000. After Einstein's death, newspapers reported that a $1,250,000 share of the elder Einstein's estate, valued in total at approximately $4,000,000, had been set aside for Lewis Einstein in the event that he divorced his wife, and that it passed to his sister Lady Waldstein after he declined to do so. This report was denied by Lady Waldstein, who indicated that the father's only wish regarding Lewis Einstein was to see that he was "taken care of", a means she accomplished by granting him an annual allowance of $20,000. Earlier, Lewis had received nothing from the estate of his mother Caroline Einstein, who instead divided her property among Einstein's sisters and various friends among European nobility.

After the death of his first wife on June 25, 1949, he remarried to Camilla Elizabeth (née Hare) Lippincott (1879–1976) in 1950. Camilla was the widow of Jay Bucknell Lippincott and daughter of Brig. Gen. Luther Rector Hare, known for participating in the Battle of the Little Big Horn.

Einstein died at his home in Paris, France, on December 2, 1967, and was buried at Père Lachaise Cemetery in Paris.

== Honors and awards ==
Einstein received the following honors and awards:

- Officer of the Legion of Honor.
- Grand Officer, S.S. Maurice and Lazarus.
- Received a presentation plate from the British Government.
- Grand Cross of the Order of the White Lion.

== Authorship ==
Einstein wrote the following books:

- The Italian Renaissance in England: Studies. New York and London: The Columbia University Press and Macmillan. 1902 – via Internet Archive.
- Luigi Pulci and the Morgante Maggiore. Berlin: Emil Felber. 1902.
- Einstein, Lewis (1903). The Relation of Literature to History. (privately published) – via Google Books (Harvard).
- "Introduction". Thoughts on Art and Life by Leonardo da Vinci. Translated by Baring, Maurice. Boston: The Merrymount Press. 1906. pp. ix- xxv – via Internet Archive.
- American Foreign Policy by a Diplomatist. Boston and New York: Houghton Mifflin Company. 1909 – via Internet Archive.
- A Prophecy of the War (1913-1914). New York: Columbia University Press. 1918 – via Internet Archive.
- Inside Constantinople : A Diplomatist's Diary during the Dardanelles Expedition, April–September 1915. London: John Murray. 1918 – via Internet Archive.
- Tudor Ideals. Boston and New York: Houghton Mifflin Company. 1921 – via Internet Archive.
- Roosevelt : His Mind in Action. Boston and New York: Houghton Mifflin Company. 1930 – via Internet Archive.
- Divided Loyalties : Americans in England during the War of Independence. Boston and New York: Houghton Mifflin Company. 1933 – via Internet Archive.
- Historical Change. Cambridge: Cambridge University Press. 1946 – via Internet Archive.
- Scattered verses. Firenze: Tip. Giuntina. 1949.
- Looking at Italian pictures in the National Gallery of Art. Washington, D.C.: National Gallery of Art. 1951. OCLC 4899717.
- Einstein, Lewis (1968). Lawrence "Larry" Emerson Gelfand (ed.). A Diplomat Looks Back. New Naven and London: Yale University Press – via Internet Archive.

Einstein also engaged in a longtime correspondence with Oliver Wendell Holmes Jr., and in 1964 their collected letters were published in the volume The Holmes-Einstein Letters : Correspondence of Mr. Justice Holmes and Lewis Einstein 1903–1935, edited by James Bishop Peabody.

== Editorship ==
Lewis Einstein was general editor of the Humanists' Library, published by Merrymount Press.

== See also ==
- Witnesses and testimonies of the Armenian genocide

== Bibliography ==
=== References ===
- "144th Annual Commencement" (re: Lewis David Einstein). June 11, 1898. p. 8 – via Internet Archive (Library of Congress).
- "145th Annual Commencement" (re: Lewis Einstein). June 7, 1899. p. 10 – via Internet Archive (Library of Congress).
- Columbia College Today (Summer 1970). "Obituaries": "1898 – Lewis David Einstein". Office of Alumni Affairs and Development. New York: Columbia College. p. 101 – via Internet Archive (Columbia University Libraries).
- Einstein, Lewis (January 1913). "The Anglo-German Rivalry and the United States". The National Review. 60 (359). London: W. H. Allen & Co.: 736–750 – via Internet Archive.
- Einstein, Lewis (1918). Prophecy of the War (1913–1914). Preface by Theodore Roosevelt. New York: Columbia University Press.
- Einstein, Lewis (2014) [1918]. Inside Constantinople: A Diplomatist's Diary During the Dardanelles Expedition, April–September, 1915. Introduction by Ara Sarafian. London: Gomidas Institute. ISBN 978-1-9093-8211-4.
- New York Times (The). LCCN sn78-4456, LCCN sn00-61556; ISSN 0362-4331, ISSN 1553-8095 (online); OCLC 1645522 (all editions).
1. "Diplomatic Appointments – Lewis Einstein of This City Gets a Secretaryship in the Embassy at Paris". Vol. 52, whole no. 16652. May 20, 1903. p. 3 (column 4, middle). Retrieved October 21, 2019.
  1. NYTimes Archives → Blog.
  2. TimesMachine → Pdf (PDF); Permalink.
  3. Via Internet Archive (SIM Box ID: IA1661903, canister no. 05). IA Collection: SIM Microfilm; Periodicals; Pub: New York Times.
2. "Nothing to Lewis Einstein – Mother Divides Her Estate Between Daughters and Friends". Vol. 60, whole no. 19284. November 11, 1910. p. 6 (column 1, lower half). Retrieved October 21, 2019.
  1. NYTimes Archives → Blog.
  2. TimesMachine → Pdf (PDF); Permalink.
  3. Via Newspapers.com.
3. "Lewis Einstein in London – American Minister to Costa Rica Is Taking Sick Wife to Paris". Vol. 61, whole no. 19741. February 11, 1912. p. 5 (column 2, near top) (digital image 37). Retrieved October 21, 2019.
  1. NYTimes Archives → Blog.
  2. TimesMachine → Pdf (PDF); Permalink.
  3. Via Internet Archive (SIM Box ID: IA1661907, canister no. 08). IA Collection: SIM Microfilm; Periodicals; Pub: New York Times.
4. "Lady Waldstein Claims $1,250,000 – Names Herself Heir to Fund Trustees Say Was for Her Brother If He Left Wife – Reveal Secret Agreement – And Allege That Lewis Einstein, Who Married Helen Railli, Surrendered Rights to His Sister" (by Marconi Transatlantic Wireless Telegraph to The New York Times. London, Feb. 10). Vol. 63, whole no. 20401. December 2, 1913. p. 1 (column 6, top). Retrieved October 21, 2019.
  1. NYTimes Archives → Blog.
  2. TimesMachine → Pdf (PDF); Permalink.
  3. Via Fultonhistory.com (PDF).
5. "Lady Waldstein Denies Agreement — Trust of $1,250,000 Was Not for Lewis Einstein If He and Wife Parted, She Says — Sir Charles on the Stand — Einstein Money Didn't Buy Knighthood, He Testifies – They Sail for England, Confident". Vol. 63, whole no. 20402. December 3, 1913. p. 13 (column 3, top). Retrieved October 21, 2019.
  1. NYTimes Archives → Blog.
  2. TimesMachine → Pdf (PDF); Permalink.
  3. Via Newspapers.com.
6. "Einstein Named to Aid Morgenthau – Bryan Appoints Ex-Secretary of Constantinople Legation a Special Envoy – Noted as a Diplomat – Wife Because of Whom Father Cut Son's Inheritance Accompanies Her Husband". Vol. 64, whole no. 20859. March 5, 1915. p. 1 (column 6, top). Retrieved October 21, 2019.
  1. NYTimes Archives → Blog.
  2. TimesMachine → Pdf (PDF); Permalink.
  3. Via Internet Archive (SIM Box ID: IA1661923, canister no. 06). IA Collection: SIM Microfilm; Periodicals; Pub: New York Times.
7. "Eight Ministers Named by Harding – Lewis Einstein of New York to Be Envoy to Czechoslovakia – Urged by Two Senators – Missions to Siam, Finland, Guatemala, Bulgaria, Panama, Nicaragua and Venezuela in the List" (Special to The New York Times). Vol. 71, whole no. 23265. October 5, 1921. p. 17 (column 1, top). Retrieved October 21, 2019.
  1. NYTimes Archives → Blog.
  2. TimesMachine → Pdf (PDF); Permalink.
  3. Via Internet Archive (SIM Box ID: IA1661908, canister no. 04). IA Collection: SIM Microfilm; Periodicals; Pub: New York Times.
8. "Czechs Honor Our Envoy – Lewis Einstein, Retiring Minister, Decorated at Reception" (AP). Vol. 79, whole no. 26304. January 30, 1930 [Dateline: Prague, Jan. 29]. p. 9 (column 2, middle). Retrieved October 21, 2019.
  1. NYTimes Archives → Blog.
  2. TimesMachine → Pdf (PDF); Permalink.
  3. Via Internet Archive (SIM Box ID: IA1661910, canister no. 03). IA Collection: SIM Microfilm; Periodicals; Pub: New York Times.
9. "Deaths – Einstein [Helen Ralli] ['… beloved wife of the Hon. Lewis Einstein']". Vol. 98, whole no. 33401. July 6, 1949. p. 27 (column 5, near bottom). Retrieved October 21, 2019.
  1. TimesMachine → Pdf (PDF); Permalink.
  2. Via Internet Archive (SIM Box ID: IA1661912, canister no. 03). IA Collection: SIM Microfilm; Periodicals; Pub: New York Times.
10. "Lewis Einstein, Ex-Diplomat, 90 – A Correspondent of Justice Holmes for 32 Years Dies". Vol. 117, whole no. 40127. December 5, 1967. p. 50 (column 5, upper half). Retrieved October 21, 2019.
  1. NYTimes Archives → Blog.
  2. TimesMachine → Pdf (PDF); Permalink.
  3. Via Internet Archive (SIM Box ID: IA1661920, canister no. 02). IA Collection: SIM Microfilm; Periodicals; Pub: New York Times.
- Peabody, James Bishop, ed. (1964). The Holmes-Einstein Letters: Correspondence of Justice Holmes and Lewis Einstein 1903-1933. New York: St. Martin's Press. pp. 122-127 – via Internet Archive.
- Times (The) (December 13, 1967). "Mr. Lewis Einstein: Diplomatist and Man of Letters". London. p. 12.
