= Holthusen (surname) =

Holthusen is a German surname. Notable people with the surname include:

- Hans Egon Holthusen (1913–1997), German lyric poet, essayist, and literary scholar
- Henry Frank Holthusen (1894–1971), American lawyer and diplomat
- Mark Holthusen, American photographer
