= Alex Beam =

American writer & journalist (born 1954)

- Born: 1954 (age 71–72)
- Education: Phillips Exeter Academy, Yale University
- Employer: The Boston Globe
- Occupations: Journalist and columnist

Alex Beam (born Jacob Alexander Beam in 1954) is an American writer and journalist. He retired as a columnist for The Boston Globe in 2012, but still contributes to the paper's op-ed page. He has worked at Newsweek and BusinessWeek, where his tenure included stints as Moscow and Boston bureau chief, before joining The Boston Globe. Beam is the author of two novels and five non-fiction books, two of which were New York Times Notable Books.

== Personal life ==
Beam grew up in Washington, D.C. His father, Jacob D. Beam, was a diplomat. Beam attended Phillips Exeter Academy, where he was foreign correspondent for the twice-weekly school newspaper, The Exonian, and graduated from Yale University in 1975. He is married to Kirsten Lundberg. He is a churchgoer. His son Christopher Beam is a journalist and screenwriter in Los Angeles.

== Career ==
He helped establish a small weekly newspaper in Ludlow, Vermont, The Black River Tribune. Beam worked at Newsweek and BusinessWeek, where his tenure included service as Moscow and Boston bureau chief, before joining The Boston Globe.

His twice-weekly column for the Globe has appeared since 1987. He was a John Knight Journalism Fellow at Stanford University in 1996–1997. In addition to his journalistic work, Beam is the author of two novels set in Russia—Fellow Travelers (1987) and The Americans Are Coming! (1991), both published by St. Martin's Press.

Beam has also published five works of non-fiction. Gracefully Insane: Life and Death Inside America's Premier Mental Hospital, which explored the history of McLean Hospital, was published in January 2002. His second non-fiction book, about the Great Books movement, A Great Idea at the Time: The Rise, Fall and Curious Afterlife of the Great Books, appeared in 2008. Both were named Notable Books in the annual list compiled by The New York Times Book Review. American Crucifixion: The Murder of Joseph Smith and the Fate of the Mormon Church came out in 2014, followed by The Feud; Vladimir Nabokov, Edmund Wilson and the End of a Beautiful Friendship. Random House published Broken Glass: Mies Van Der Rohe, Edith Farnsworth, and the Fight Over a Modernist Masterpiece in March, 2020.

For a time, Beam wrote a weekly blog about the game of squash for Vanity Fair's online edition.

== Controversy ==
In December 2010, Beam wrote an article in the Globe about Liverpool Football Club's supporters, criticizing them for continuing to mourn the deaths of 96 supporters during the Hillsborough disaster, which he called a "riot." He also referred to the city as "doggy" and "grotty."

The Globe later issued a correction to the online version of the article, acknowledging that the disaster was not a riot, and that the official investigation blamed poor crowd control and inadequate stadium design.
