= Lowell House =

Residential House of Harvard College

- Residential House at Harvard University
- Harvard University
- Shield
- Location: 10 Holyoke Place
- Coordinates: 42°22′15″N 71°07′05″W
- Motto: Occasionem Cognosce ("Recognize Opportunity") (Latin)
- Established: 1930
- Named for: Abbott Lawrence Lowell and the Lowell family
- Colours: Blue, White
- Sister college: Pierson College
- Faculty Deans: David Laibson and Nina Zipser
- Undergraduates: 400
- Called: Lowellians
- Website: www.lowell.harvard.edu

Lowell House is one of twelve undergraduate residential Houses at Harvard University, located at 10 Holyoke Place facing Mount Auburn Street between Harvard Yard and the Charles River. Officially, it is named for the Lowell family, but the letters ALL above the main gate reference Abbott Lawrence Lowell, Harvard's president at the time of construction. Its neo-Georgian design, centered on two landscaped courtyards, received the 1938 Harleston Parker Medal. Lowell House is simultaneously close to the Yard, Harvard Square, and other Harvard "River" houses. Its blue-capped bell tower is a local landmark.

== History and traditions ==
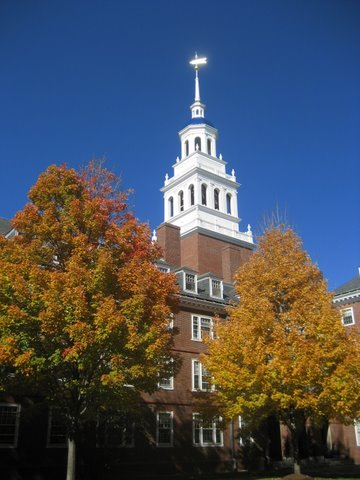
Lowell House bell tower in autumn.

Lowell was one of the first Houses built in the realization of President Lowell's goal of providing on-campus accommodations for every Harvard College student throughout his career at the college. (See Harvard College house system.) Its first Master, was Mathematics Department chairman Julian Lowell Coolidge, who also instituted Monday-night high table. Historian Elliott Perkins was the first to hold the position of Resident Dean (until recently known as the Allston Burr Senior Tutor) then was Master from 1942 to 1963. Classicist Zeph Stewart was the third Master, and William and Mary Lee Bossert served from 1975 to 1998. In 1998, Diana Eck and Dorothy Austin became the first same-sex couple to be house masters (during their tenure, the term "master" was replaced with "faculty dean"). The current faculty deans of Lowell House are David Laibson and Nina Zipser. Lowell's sister college at Yale University is Pierson College.

House traditions include Tea on Thursday afternoons, a May Day Waltz at dawn on the Weeks Footbridge, high table, and the annual Lowell House Opera mounted in the dining hall. Springtime brings the Bacchanalia Formal, often with a live swing band in the courtyard.

For each Arts First event, the first weekend in May, there is a courtyard performance of the 1812 Overture, during which those not part of the official orchestral ensemble are encouraged to assist on kazoos; in lieu of cannon, hydrogen-filled balloons are ignited by the House chemistry tutor; and until recently (see below) the performance would climax with the role originally scored by Tchaikovsky for authentic Russian zvon (a "bell" in the Slovakina language or "bell sound" in Russian), being played (appropriately enough) by Lowell's own authentic Russian zvon.

There is a winter holiday dinner, and various sophomore, senior, and faculty dinners take place throughout the year. Language tables and special-interest tables are common features of everyday lunches and dinners. Many House events are organized by Lowell's "House Committee" of elected undergraduates from within the House. The committee operates separately from the Harvard Undergraduate Association, to organize student events and manage funding. The HoCo, as with the other student government organizations in other Houses, is funded by the College and the HUA.

Lowell House was the residence of Silas (Method Man) and Jamal (Redman) in the 2001 comedy How High.

As part of Harvard's House Renewal Project, Lowell House closed for renovation in the summer of 2017; work was completed in the summer of 2019.

== Architecture ==
Designed by the firm of Coolidge Shepley Bulfinch and Abbott and constructed in 1930 for $3.62 million, the House was named for the prominent Lowell family, closely identified with Harvard since John Lowell graduated in 1721. The busts of President Abbott Lawrence Lowell (1909–1933) and poet James Russell Lowell, are featured in the main courtyard. In the Dining Hall are portraits of Lowell and his wife Anna Parker Lowell; his sister, poet Amy Lowell; his brother, astronomer Percival Lowell; and his grandfather John Amory Lowell.

Prior to the 1996 transition to randomized House assignments, Lowell's central location, picturesque courtyard, elegant dining hall, and charming traditions made it a popular housing choice.

The Lowell House arms are those of the Lowell family, blazoned: Shield: sable, a dexter hand couped at the wrist grasping three darts, one in pale and two in saltire, all in argent. The crest is a stag's head cabossed, between the attires a pheon azure. The motto is Occasionem Cognosce ("Recognise Opportunity") In more prosaic terms, a shield with a black field displays a right hand cut off at the wrist and grasping three arrows, one vertical and two crossed diagonally, in silver. Above is a stag's head mounted behind the ear, and between its antlers is a barbed, broad arrowhead in blue. The house colors are blue and white.

== The Lowell House Bells ==
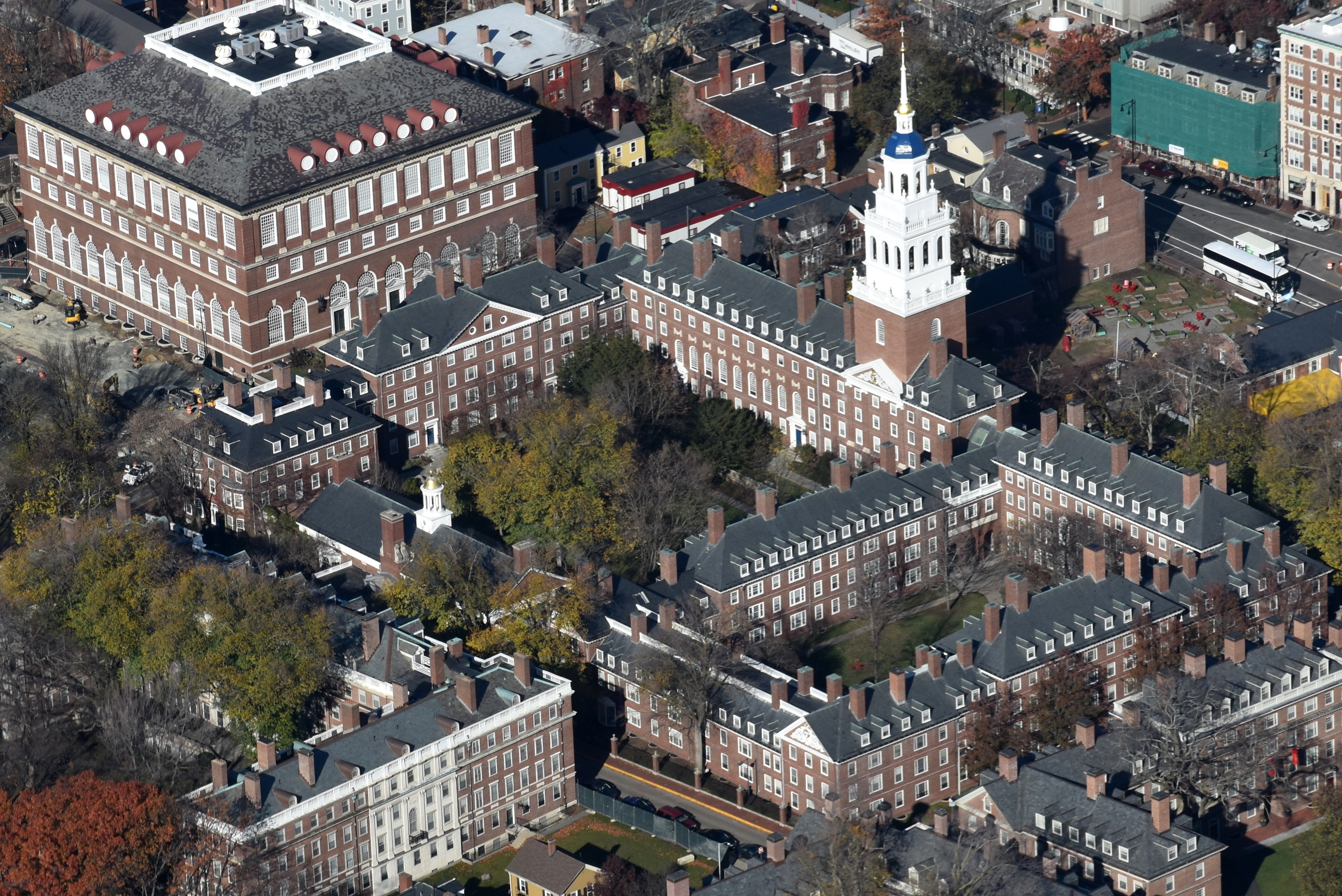
Lowell House's bell tower and two courtyards, with Malkin Athletic Center at upper left

For three-quarters of a century, Lowell House's bell tower was home to a set of authentic Russian zvon, one of the few complete sets of pre-revolutionary Russian bells surviving anywhere. The eighteen bells were bought in Russia around 1930 by Thomas Whittemore with the financial aid of millionaire Chicago plumbing magnate Charles R. Crane‍—‌who reportedly paid merely their value as scrap‍—‌just as they were to be melted down by Soviet authorities. Crane donated them to Harvard in 1930 just as plans for Lowell House were nearing completion.

Like those seen today on Dunster and Eliot Houses, Lowell's tower was originally meant to be a clock-tower‍—‌Lowell's in particular is reminiscent of Philadelphia's Independence Hall, although it was actually modeled after a Dutch church. With word of Crane's gift, the planned tower was changed to the blue-capped bell tower seen today. (One of the eighteen bells did not harmonize with the others, so was hung in the Harvard Business School's Baker Library.)

The bells originally hung in Moscow's Danilov Monastery (now the seat of the Patriarch of the Russian Orthodox Church) and were installed with the help, at first, of musician Konstantin Konstantinovich Saradzhev, and Vsevolod Andronoff, a former resident of the monastery They range in weight from 22 pounds (10 kg) to 26,700 pounds (12,100 kg, and known to Lowell House students as "Mother Earth"). The bells are consecrated, and are of great significance to the Russian Orthodox Church, in the liturgy of which bells play an important role.

At Lowell, the bells were usually rung on Sundays at 1pm by resident Klappermeisters. After the annual Harvard–Yale football game, Harvard's score would sometimes be proclaimed on the "Mother Earth," with Yale's score tolled on the "Bell of Pestilence, Famine, and Despair."

With the reopening of the Danilov Monastery, it was suggested that the bells be returned to their original home. At Harvard's June 2008 Commencement, they sounded for the last time at Lowell House, after which the bell tower was partially dismantled so that the bells could be withdrawn. In their places were hung newly cast near-replica bells obtained with the financial assistance of the Link of Times Foundation, created by Russian industrialist Viktor Vekselberg.

The now-departed bells may still be heard on the Lowell House Virtual Bell Tower. The bells sound Sunday afternoons during term time, and at special events such as commencement.

== Notable alumni ==
Lowell House courtyard in winter.

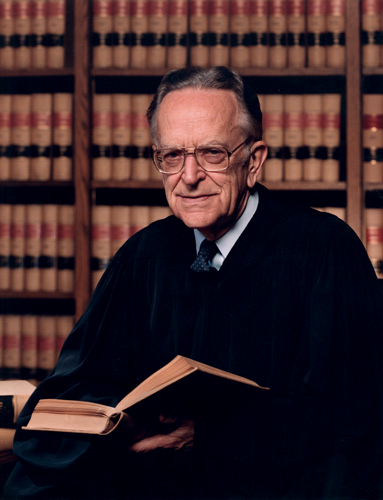
Harry Blackmun

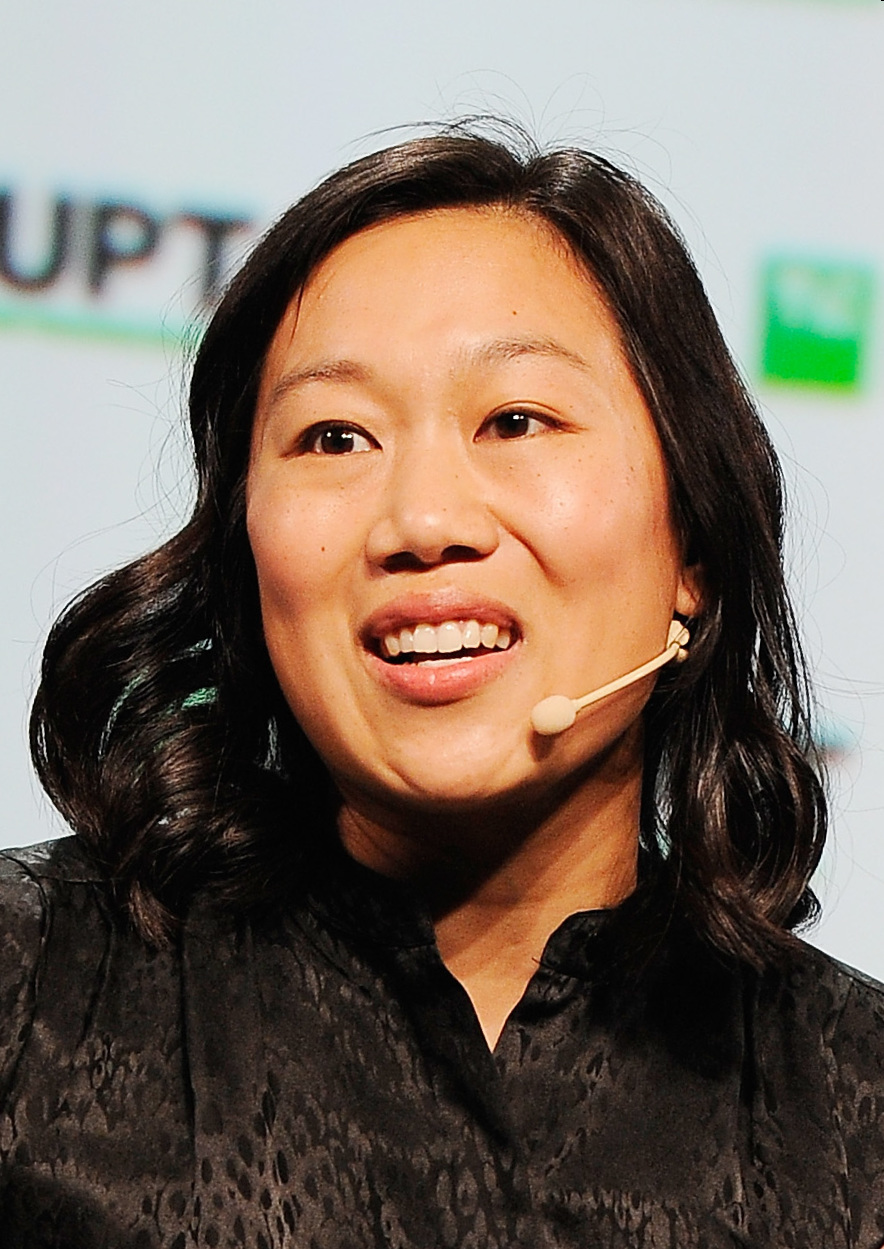
Priscilla Chan

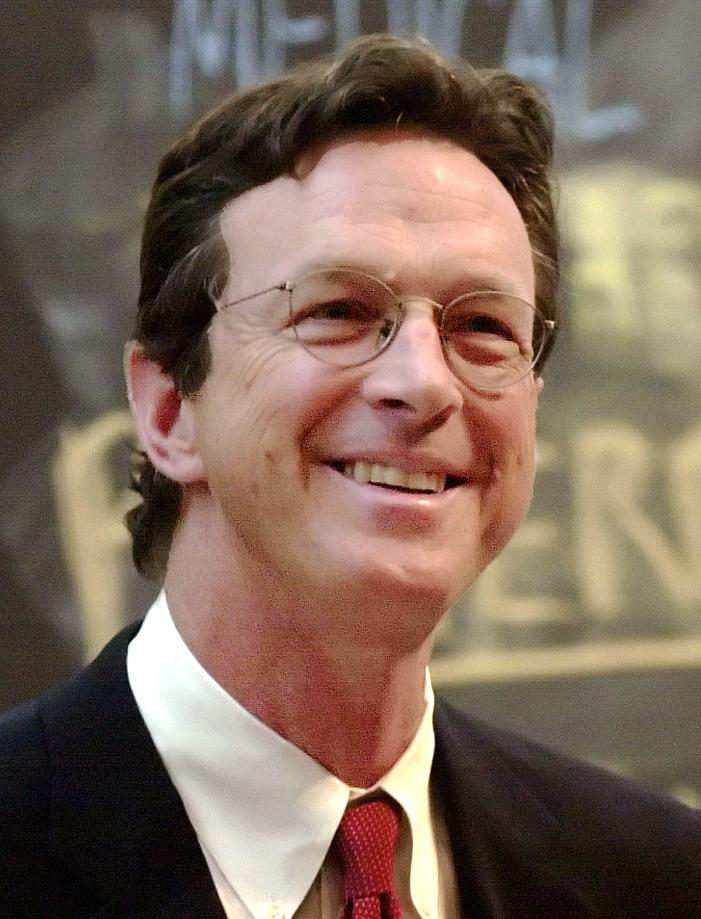
Michael Crichton

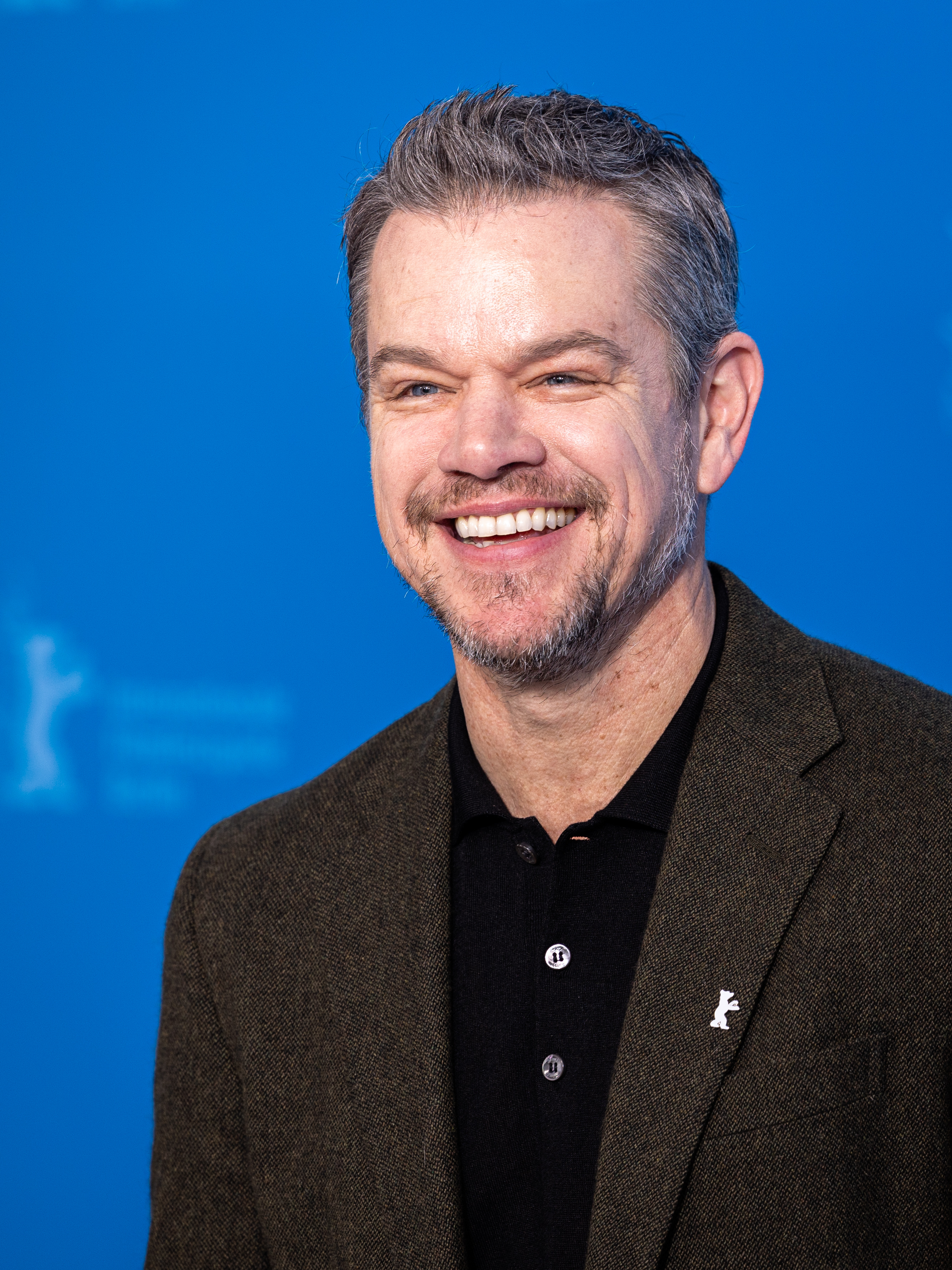
Matt Damon

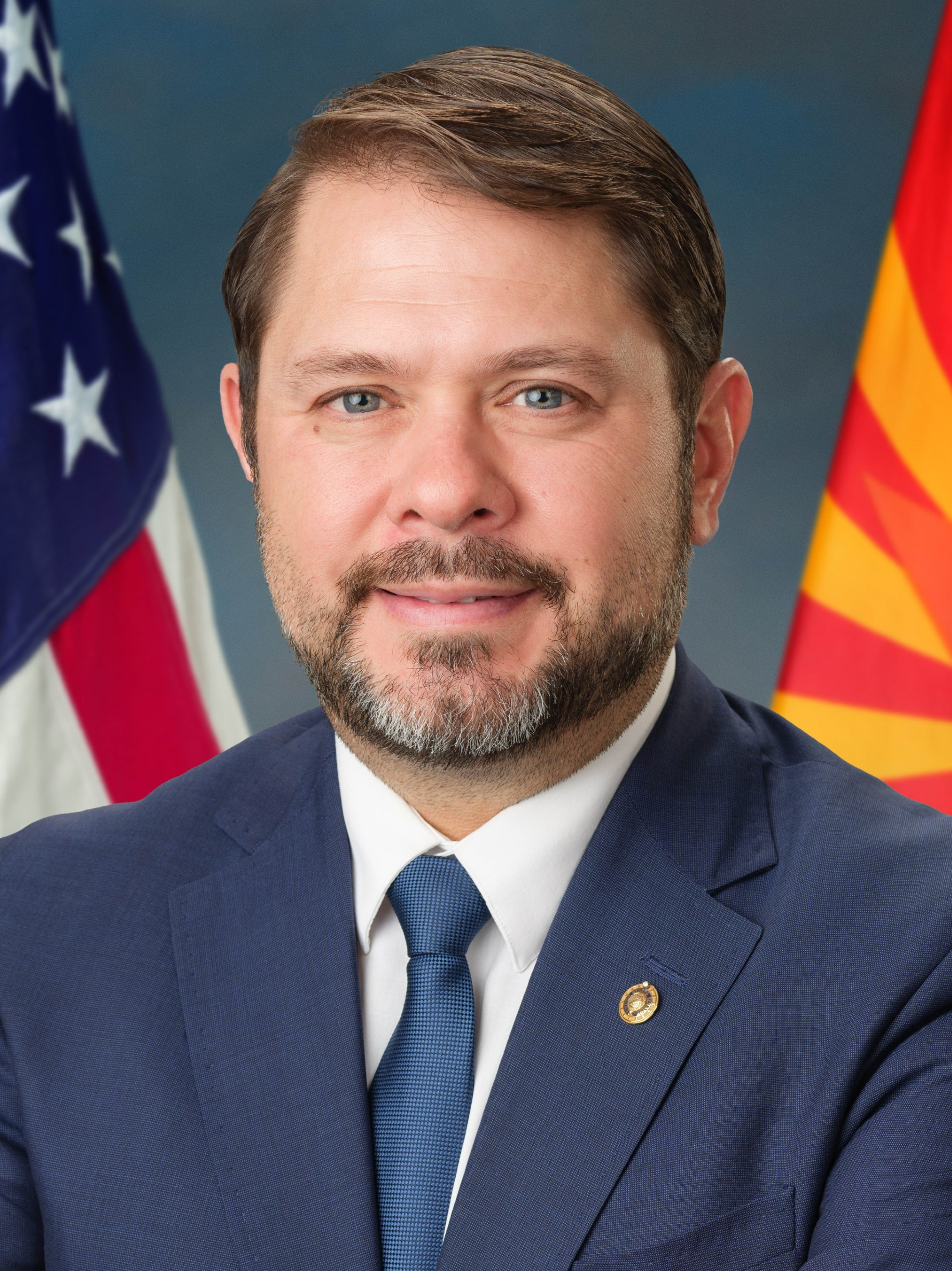
Ruben Gallego

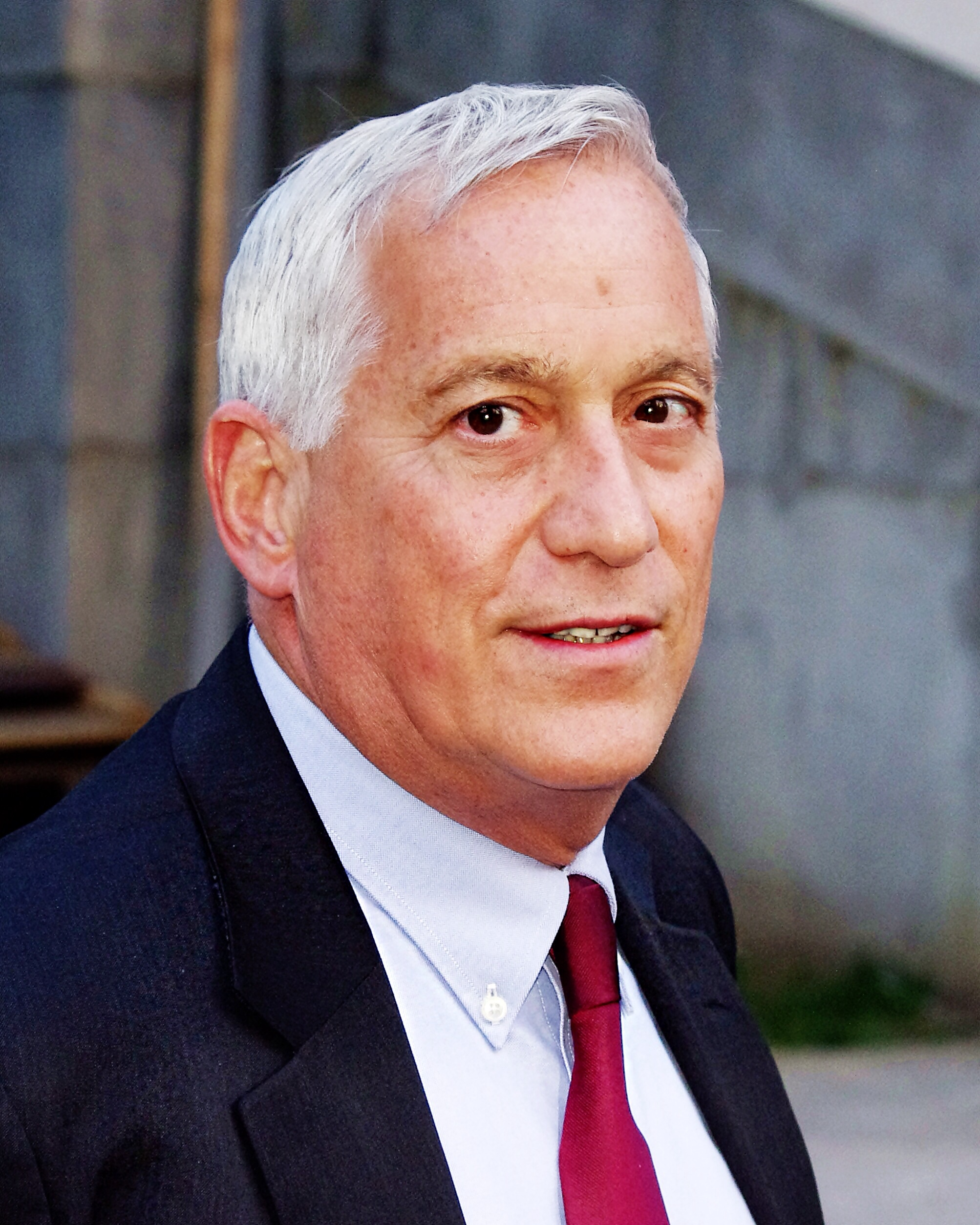
Walter Isaacson

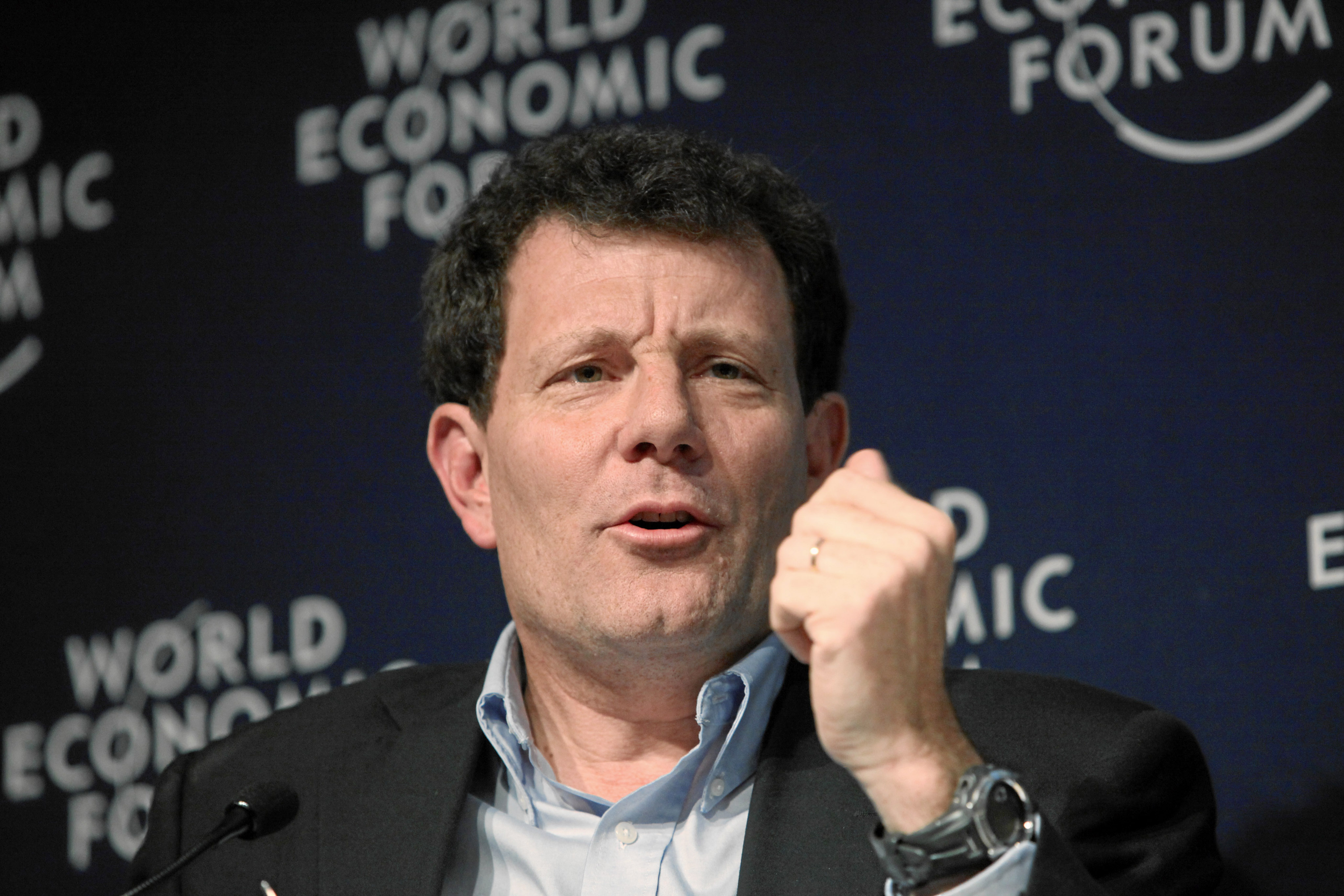
Nicholas Kristof

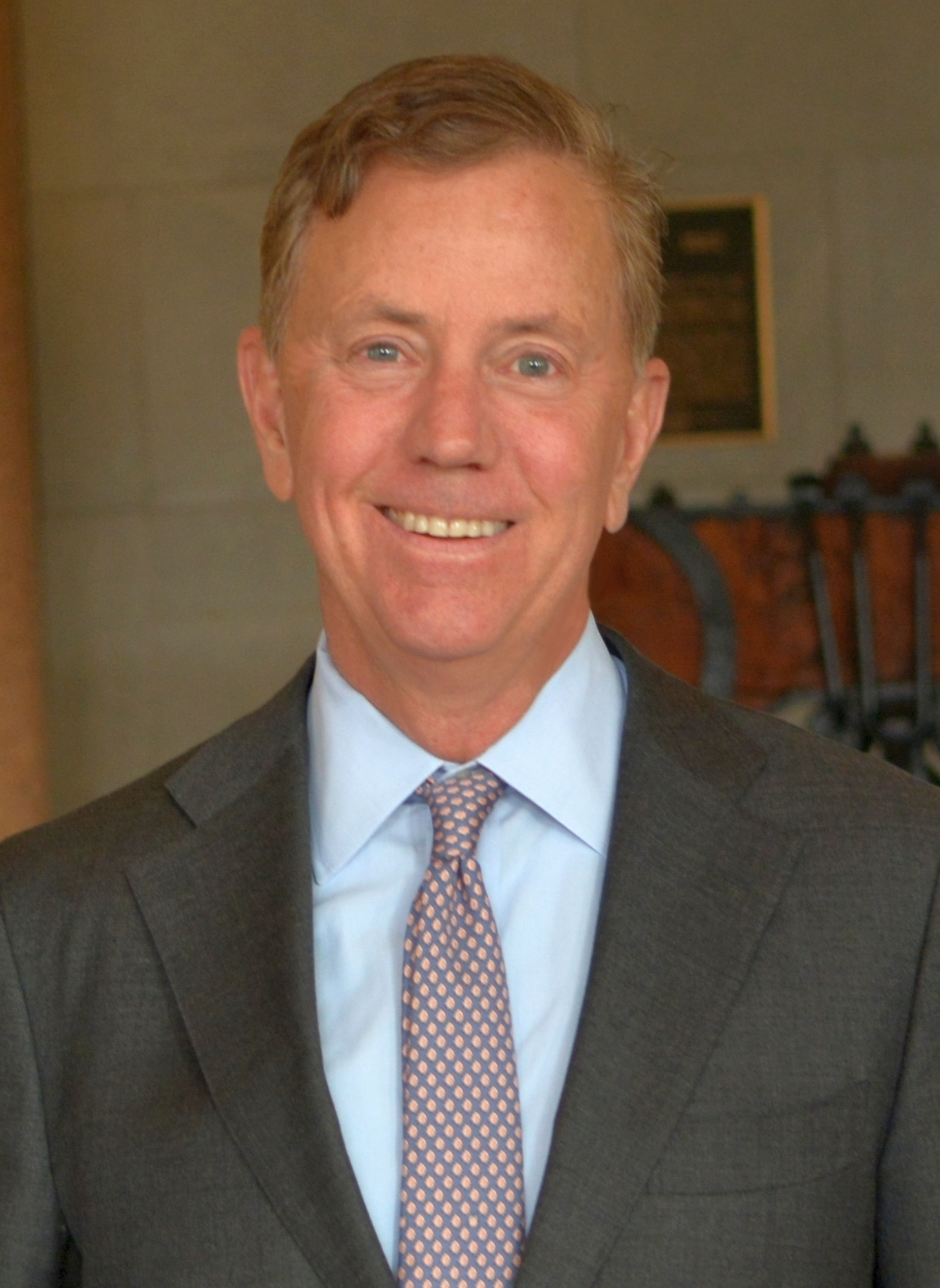
Ned Lamont

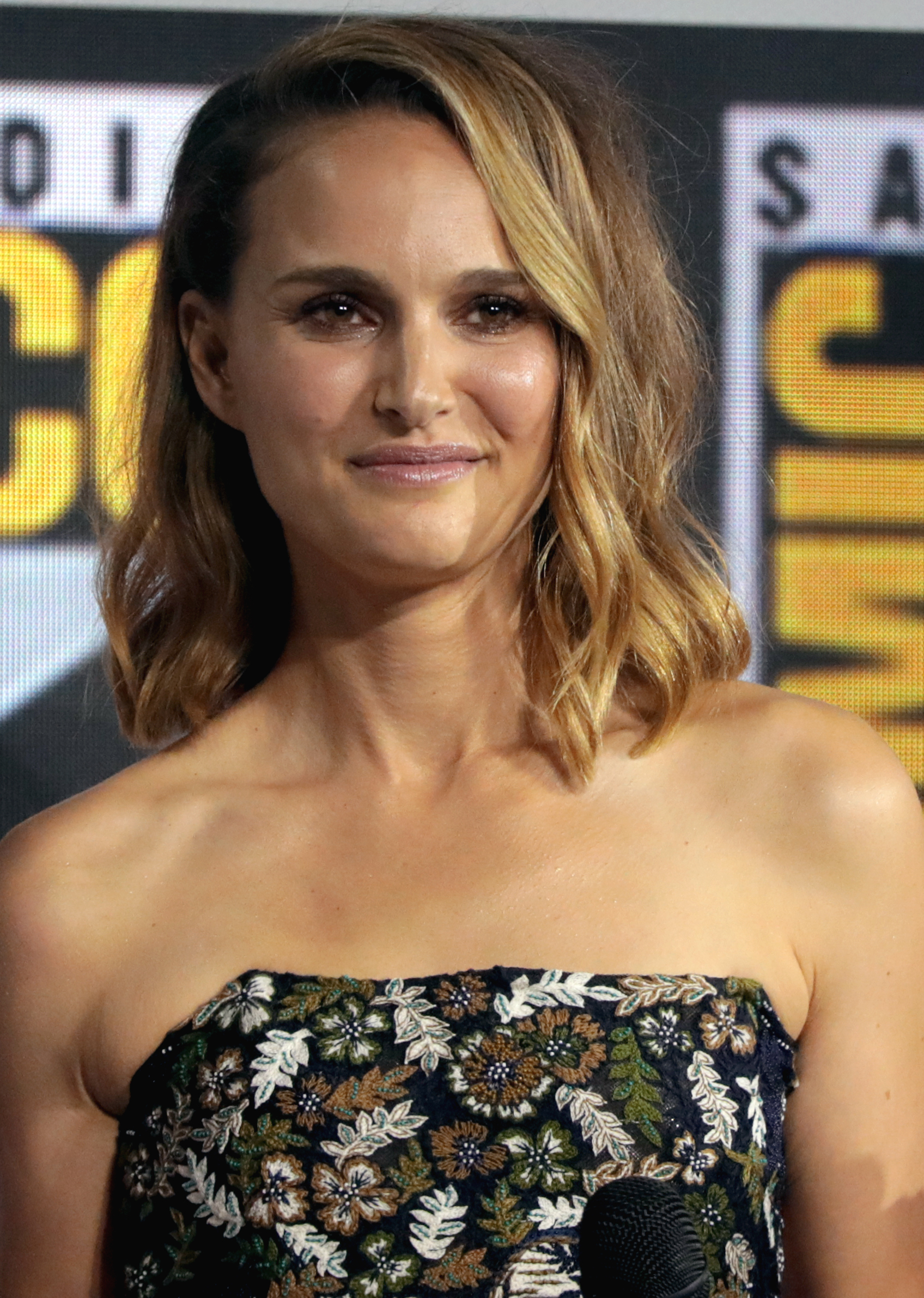
Natalie Portman

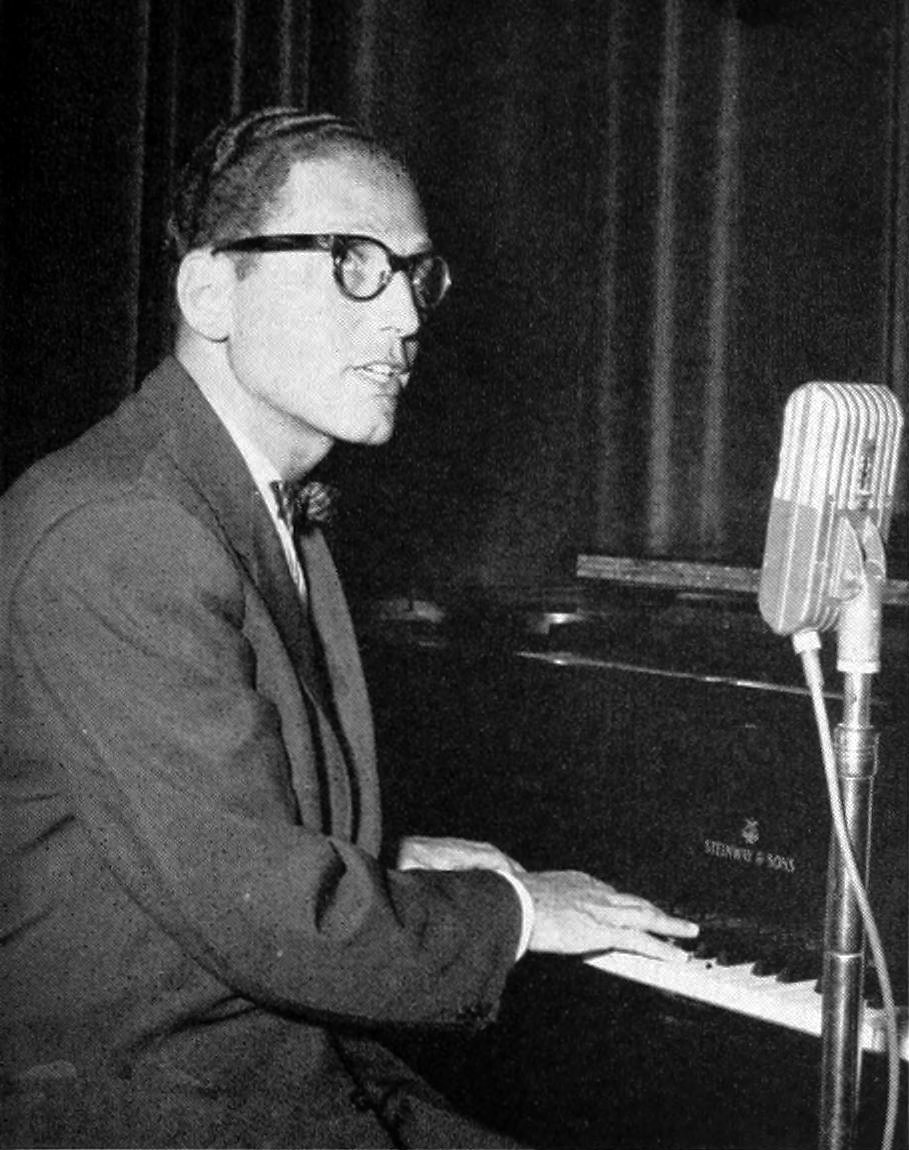
Tom Lehrer

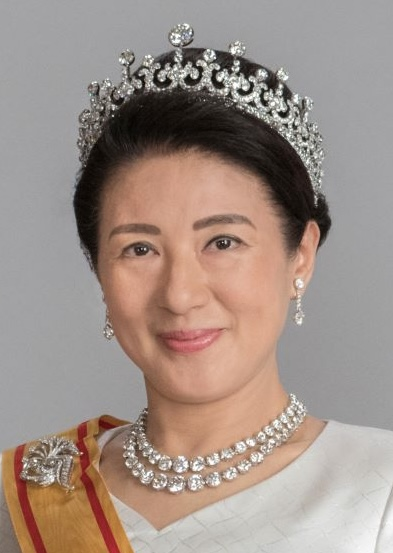
Empress Masako

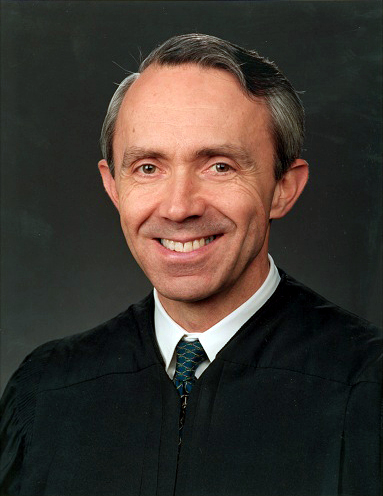
David Souter

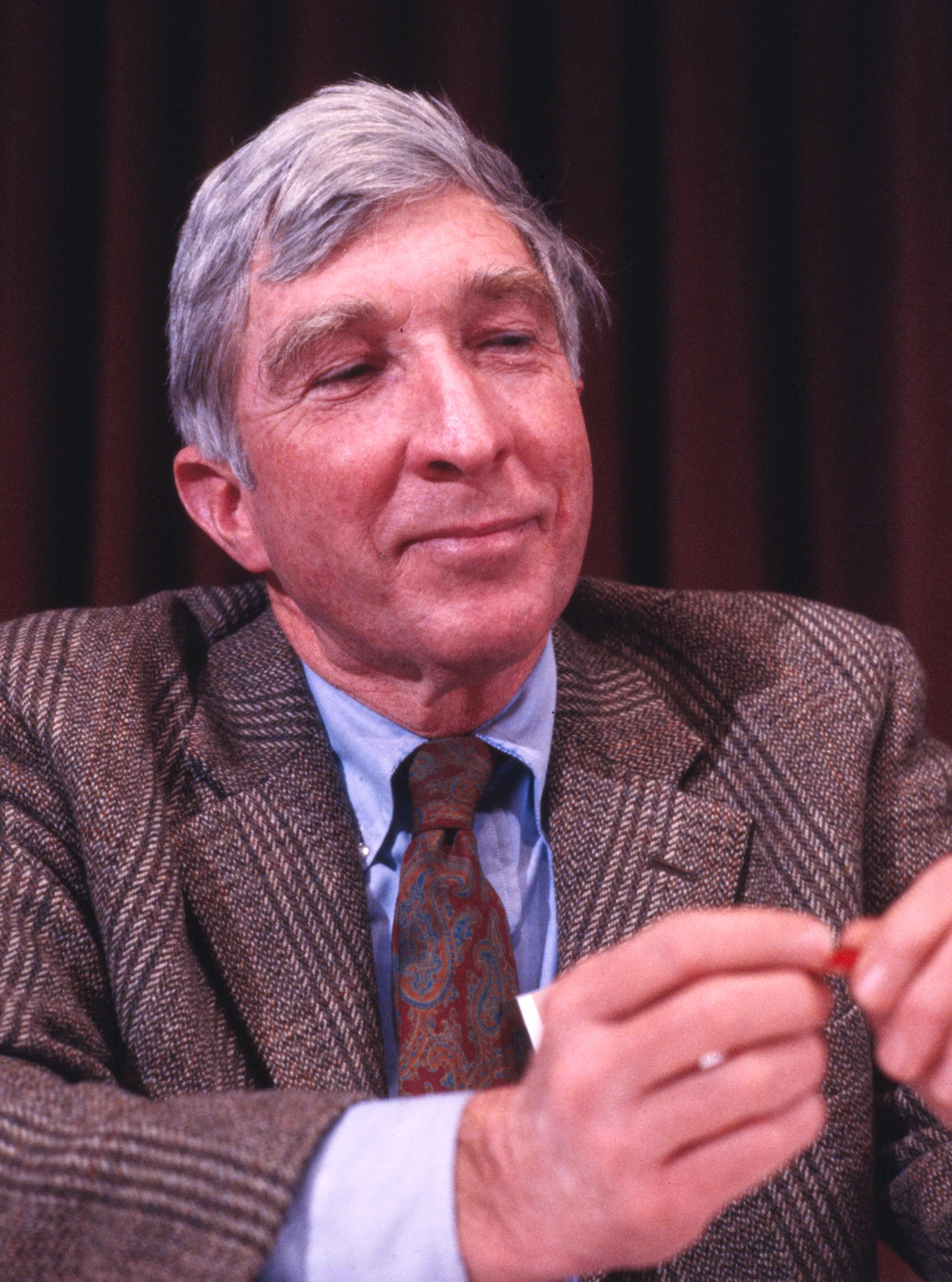
John Updike

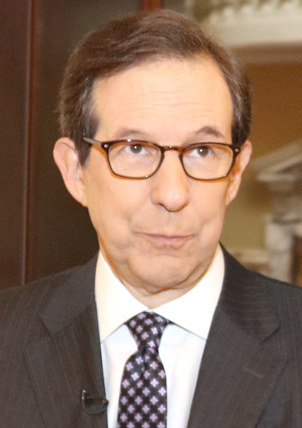
Chris Wallace

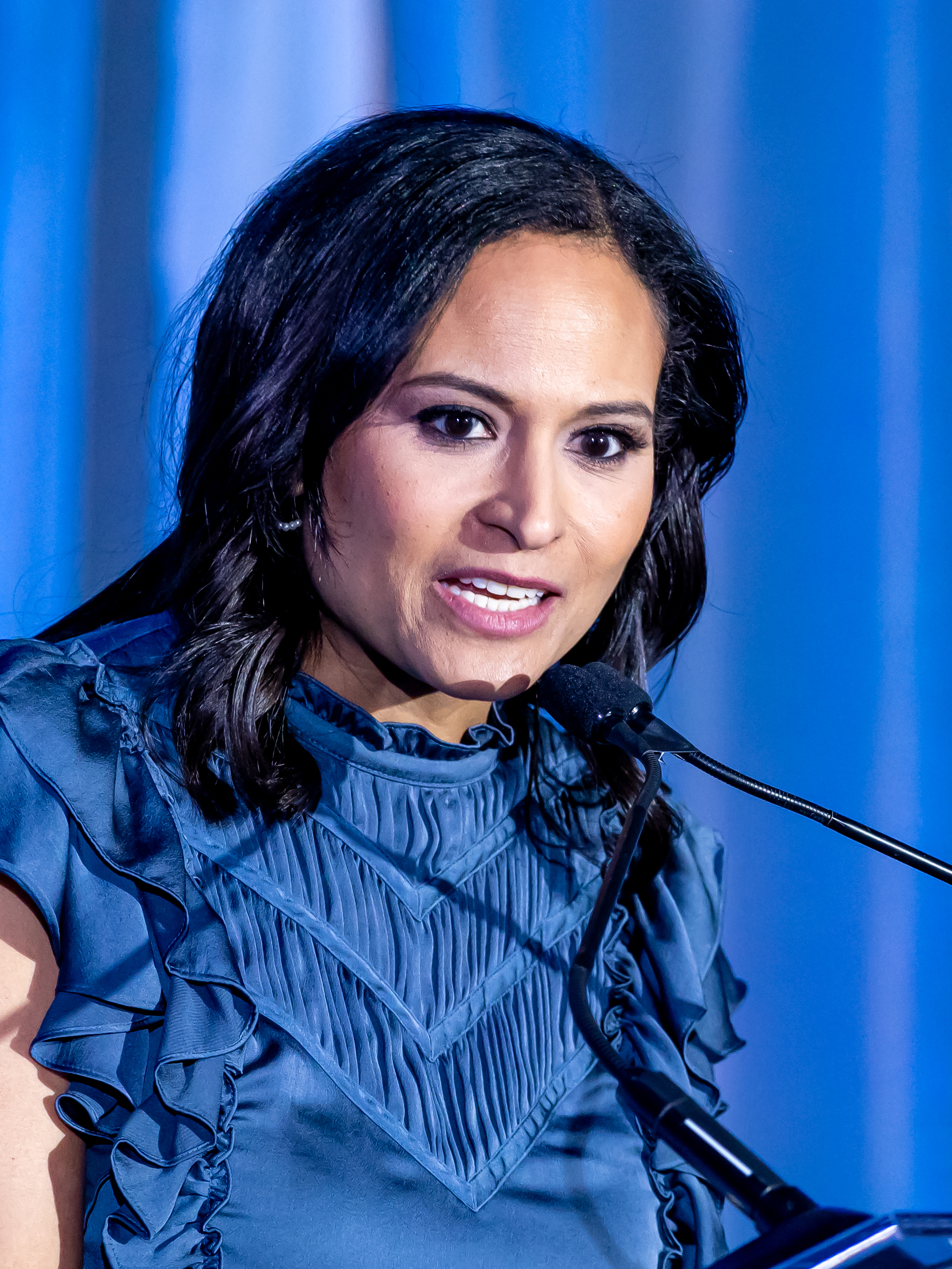
Kristen Welker

Other notable former residents and alumni of Lowell House include John Ashmead, John Berendt, Philip F. Gura, Vanessa Lann, Alan Jay Lerner, Robert Lowell, Anthony Lewis, Frank Rich, Ryan Max Riley, Subramanian Swamy, David Vitter, Andrew Weil, and Christian Wolff.
