= Konstantin Konstantinovich Saradzhev =

Russian composer

Konstantin Konstantinovich Saradzhev (Russian: Константи́н Константи́нович Сара́джев; 1900–1941) was a Russian bell ringer, composer, and musical theorist.

The son of the conductor and violinist Konstantin Saradzhev, K.K. ("Kotik") Saradzhev was strongly affected by hearing a powerful church bell at the age of seven and became a musician specializing in bells (though he also played the piano). He was known for "his superhuman aural acuity: between two adjacent whole tones, he perceived not just one half tone but a half tone flanked on either side by a hundred and twenty-one flats and a hundred and twenty-one sharps" and "could distinguish all four thousand of Moscow's church bells" by their unique frequencies. He composed "bell symphonies" making use of the microtonal complexities of Russian bells, but was unable to realize them to his satisfaction in Russia. When Harvard University invited him in 1930 to help install at Lowell House the Danilov Monastery bells Charles R. Crane had bought from Russia, he thought he would be able to perform his works there; disappointed in this and encountering suspicion aroused by his eccentric behavior, he became distraught and was sent back to Moscow, where he wrote a book Muzyka-kolokol ("Music-bell") that has since disappeared and is believed to have died in an insane asylum in 1941. Marina Tsvetaeva's sister Anastasia published a memoir about his life in 1977.

== Sources ==
- Elif Batuman, "The Bells," The New Yorker, 27 April 2009
- Reminiscences of K.K. Saradzhev (in Russian)
- Anastasia Tsvetaeva, Skaz o zvonare moskovskom (Memoir about Saradzhev; in Russian)
