= Richard Crane (diplomat) =

American diplomat (1882–1938)

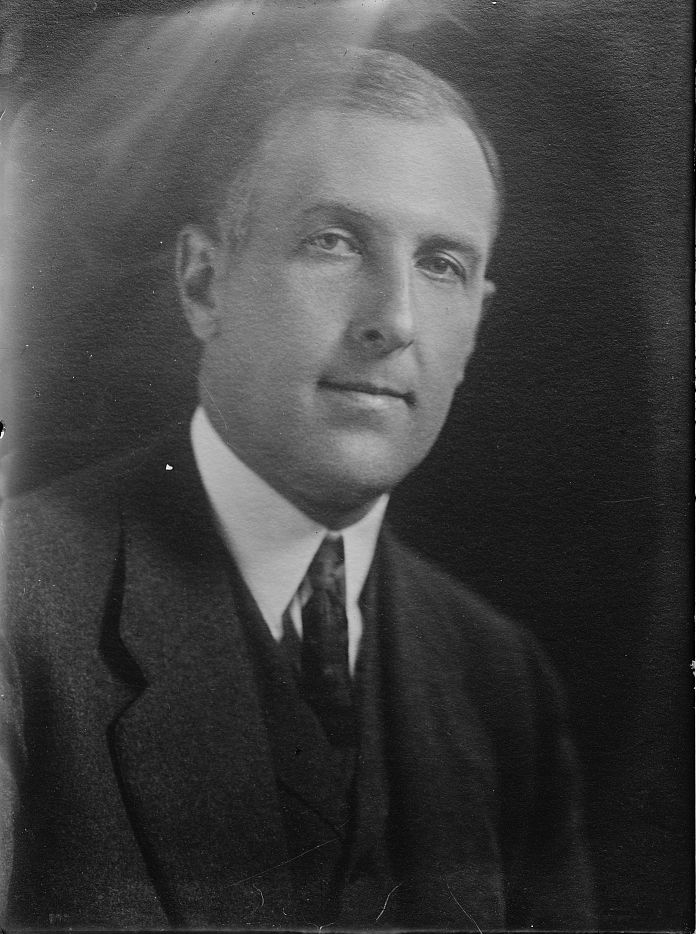
- Crane circa 1919

U.S. Minister to Czechoslovakia
- In office June 11, 1919 – December 5, 1921
- President: Woodrow Wilson
- Preceded by: Office Established
- Succeeded by: Lewis Einstein

Personal details
- Born: August 12, 1882 Denver, Colorado
- Died: October 3, 1938 (aged 56) Westover Plantation, Charles City County, Virginia
- Spouse: Ellen Douglas Bruce (m. 1909)

Richard Teller Crane II (August 12, 1882 - October 3, 1938) was the first United States diplomat accredited to Czechoslovakia with the title Envoy Extraordinary and Minister Plenipotentiary. He received a recess appointment from President Woodrow Wilson on April 23, 1919, and was subsequently confirmed by the United States Senate on June 26, 1919. Crane presented his credentials to the Czechoslovak government on June 11, 1919, and remained in office until December 5, 1921.

== Biography ==
He was born on August 12, 1882, in Denver, Colorado, to Charles Richard Crane, a diplomat and supporter of President Wilson. In 1919, he received a recess appointment from President Woodrow Wilson, and was subsequently confirmed by the United States Senate on June 26, 1919. He was the grandson of Richard Teller Crane I, a Chicago manufacturer. He married Ellen Douglas Bruce in 1909 and they made their home at the Westover plantation in Charles City County, Virginia.

He died by suicide on October 3, 1938, after firing his shotgun to his temple at his estate, Westover Plantation. The initial news reports indicated it was a "hunting accident". He was buried in the Westover estate burial grounds.
