= Henry Frank Holthusen =

American lawyer

Henry Frank Holthusen (August 3, 1894 – September 19, 1971, Manhattan, New York City) was a corporation, admiralty, and international lawyer and diplomat.

== Personal life ==
Holthusen graduated from Columbia University both for undergraduate (1915) and law degrees (1917). He died of cancer at his home at 128 Central Park South.

== Career ==
After serving in the US Army during World War I, Holthusen was a special assistant United States Attorney General and later counsel in the United States for the newly established Latvian and Estonian Governments.

President Hoover named him Minister to Czechoslovakia in 1933, but it was an end of the term appointment and he did not serve. He negotiated with the Mexican Government for the Economic Survey of Mexico by a joint United States‐Mexican Economic Commission in 1944 and headed the Telecommunications Mission to Japan, Turkey and other countries in 1951‐52. He was a partner in the law firm of Holthusen & Pinkham until 1952.
