= Charles Richard Crane =

American businessman (1858–1939)

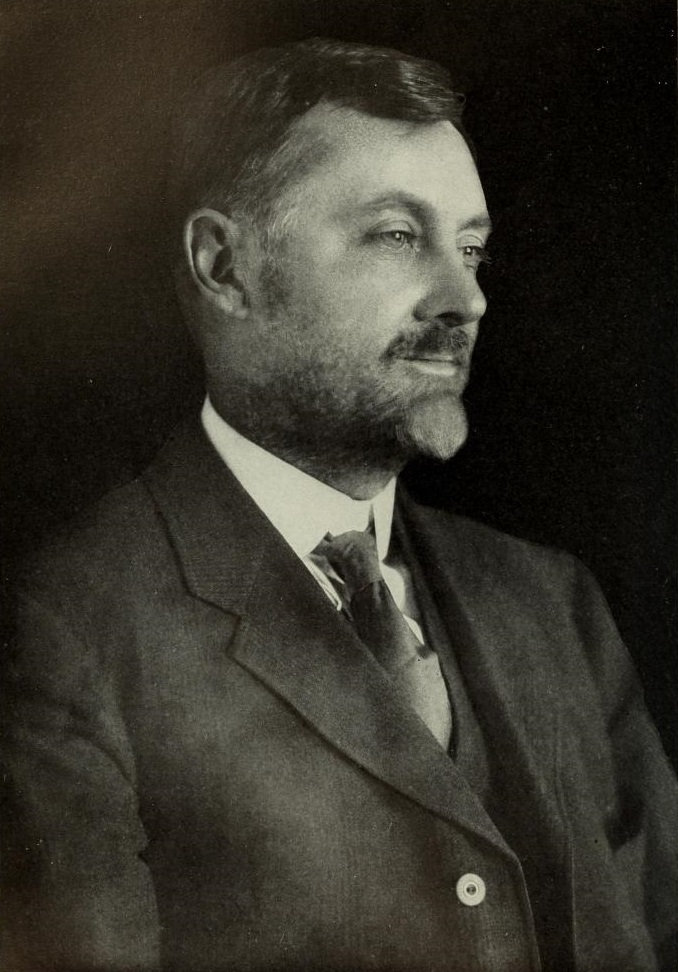
Charles Richard Crane in 1909

Charles Richard Crane (August 7, 1858 – February 15, 1939) was an American businessman and Arabist. His widespread business interests gave him entree into domestic and international political affairs where he enjoyed privileged access to many influential power brokers at the top levels of government. His special arena of interest was Eastern Europe and the Middle East.

== Biography and diplomatic activity ==
Crane was the eldest son of plumbing parts mogul, Chicago manufacturer, Richard T. Crane. As a young man, Crane traveled extensively with his friend Charles B. Cory, a leading ornithologist whom Crane had met while visiting Boston. Crane and Cory shared an interest in baseball, and from 1888 to 1892, the pair funded and played on the Hyannis town team in what is now the Cape Cod Baseball League. At Cory and Crane's expense, various well-known professional and amateur players were brought in to play alongside the Hyannis locals. When Cory lost his family's fortune in 1906, Crane purchased Cory's vast collection of bird specimens and donated it to Chicago's Field Museum of Natural History with the stipulation that the museum would employ Cory as permanent curator of the collection.

In the 1900s, he brought Thomas Masaryk, Maksim Kovalevsky and Pavel Milyukov to lecture at the University of Chicago. After meeting Masaryk, he became interested in Slavic nationalism and sponsored The Slav Epic paintings by Alphonse Mucha When Mucha designed the Czechoslovak bills, he used a previous portrait of Josephine Crane Bradley as Slavia for the 100 koruna bill.

President William Howard Taft appointed Crane minister to China on July 16, 1909, but on the eve of his departure to his post on October 4, 1909, he was recalled to Washington and forced to resign under pressure by US Secretary of State Philander C. Knox, who held him responsible for the publication in a Chicago newspaper of the US government's objections to two recent treaties between Japan and China.

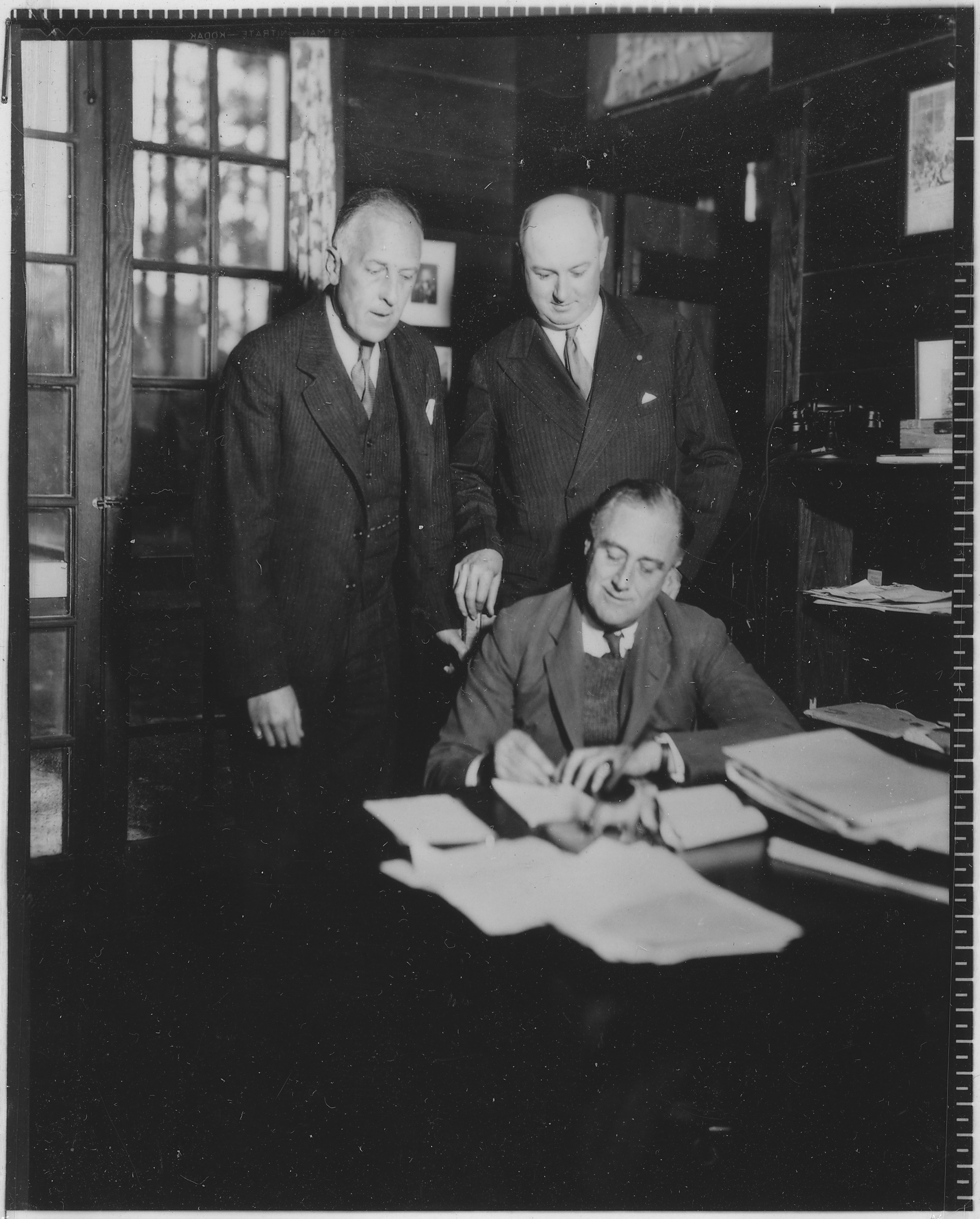
Charles R. Crane (left) and James Farley stand behind Franklin D. Roosevelt in Warm Springs, Georgia, December 7, 1931.

Crane contributed heavily to Woodrow Wilson's 1912 election campaign. Wilson rewarded Crane with appointments to the 1917 Special Diplomatic Commission to Russia, known as the Root Commission, as a member of the American Section of the Paris Peace Conference, and to the 1919 Inter-Allied Commission on Mandates in Turkey that became known as the King-Crane Commission. While the commission was originally proposed by the US to develop an international consensus on the future make up and status of postwar Middle East nations, the commission quickly became a US-only sponsored effort. With the appointment of Crane as co-head of the commission, it set about to issue a report to inform US policy makers. In respect to the creation of a Jewish state in the Middle East, the report cautioned "Not only you as president but the American people as a whole should realize that if the American government decided to support the establishment of a Jewish state in Palestine, they are committing the American people to the use of force in that area, since only by force can a Jewish state in Palestine be established or maintained." Crane opposed the establishment of a Jewish state in the Middle East. He was a passionate spokesman for the independence of the Arab states.

From May and June 1918 he helped Tomas Masaryk meet with President Wilson to negotiate support for Czechoslovak legions in Russia and for the founding of a new independent Czechoslovak state.

Crane was appointed United States Ambassador to China by President Wilson and served from March 22, 1920, to July 2, 1921.

In 1925 Crane founded the New York-based Institute of Current World Affairs. The institute employed field representatives in Mexico, Jerusalem, and occasionally Moscow. These representatives compiled regular reports on developments in their regions, and shared their expertise during ICWA-sponsored lecture tours of major US universities. The reports were also made available to the US State Department.

In 1931, Crane helped finance the first explorations for oil in Saudi Arabia and Yemen. He was instrumental in gaining the American oil concession there.

He was also a member of the famous Jekyll Island Club (aka The Millionaires Club) on Jekyll Island, Georgia.

His son, Richard Teller Crane II, was a diplomat.

In 1929 Charles R. Crane was appointed by President Coolidge on the recommendation of Gutzon Borglum to the Mount Rushmore National Memorial Commission.

=== Harvard/Danilov Bells ===
In the wake of the Bolshevik revolution in Russia, Crane was instrumental in rescuing from destruction some of the most important Russian bells, from the Danilov Monastery. When the Communists closed the monastery in 1929, the Danilov bell set was saved from Communist melting by Crane's purchase of the bells. The largest of the bells, Bolshoi (or The Big One - called The Mother Earth Bell at Harvard), weighs 13 tons and has a 700-pound clapper. The smallest weighs just 22 pounds. Crane donated the bells to Harvard University and they were installed in the main tower of Harvard's Lowell House and at Harvard Business School's Baker Library, where they safely remained for over 70 years. Beginning in the 1980s, with openness under Gorbachev, there were calls to return the bells, and after numerous meetings over the years, the bells were returned to the Russian Orthodox Church and Danilov Monastery in 2008.

=== Allegations of antisemitism ===
When Franklin Roosevelt appointed William E. Dodd American ambassador to Germany in 1933, Crane wrote Dodd a letter of congratulation that told him:

The Jews, after winning the war, galloping along at a swift pace, getting Russia, England and Palestine, being caught in the act of trying to seize Germany, too, and meeting their first real rebuff, have gone plumb crazy and are deluging the world—particularly easy America—with anti-German propaganda. I strongly advise you to resist every social invitation.

According to Larson, at a dinner, Ambassador Dodd heard Crane express admiration for Hitler and learned that Crane also had no objection to how the Nazis were treating Germany's Jews, telling Dodd: "Let Hitler have his way."

In his biography of Crane, Norman E. Saul notes that he maintained relationships with prominent Jews such as Louis Brandeis and Lillian Wald and suggests that his “vague but open” antisemitism was not uncommon among Anglo-Saxons of his time. Saul notes that his admiration of Hitler left, in retrospect, the most damaging legacy to his reputation.

== Death and legacy ==
On February 15, 1939, Crane died of influenza in his Winter home in Palm Springs, California.

On April 24, 2006, Crane's art collection was sold at Christie's auction house.
