= Konstantin Saradzhev =

Konstantin Saradzhev (also Constantin Saradgeff, born Saradzhian; 8 October 1877 – 22 July 1954) was an Armenian conductor and violinist. He was an advocate of new Russian music, and conducted a number of premieres of works by Pyotr Ilyich Tchaikovsky, Modest Mussorgsky, Igor Stravinsky, Sergei Prokofiev, Nikolai Myaskovsky, Dmitri Shostakovich, and Aram Khachaturian. His son Konstantin Konstantinovich Saradzhev was a noted bell ringer and musical theorist.

== Biography ==
He was born Konstantin Solomonovich Saradzhian in Derbent, Dagestan, in 1877; his father was a doctor. He attended the Moscow Conservatory, where he studied violin under Jan Hřímalý and theory under Sergei Taneyev, graduating in 1898. He then became a teacher and concert performer. He had further violin study with Otakar Ševčík in Prague in 1900. In 1901 he became conductor of the Moscow Opera Lovers' Club. He also formed his own string quartet. From 1904 to 1908 he studied conducting with Arthur Nikisch in Leipzig. On return to Russia he conducted the summer symphony concerts at Sokolniki Park in 1908, 1910 and 1911. He became director of the State Institute of Theatrical Art. On 8 October 1913 he conducted the first performance of Mussorgsky's much-delayed and still incomplete comic opera The Fair at Sorochyntsi at the Free Theatre in Moscow.

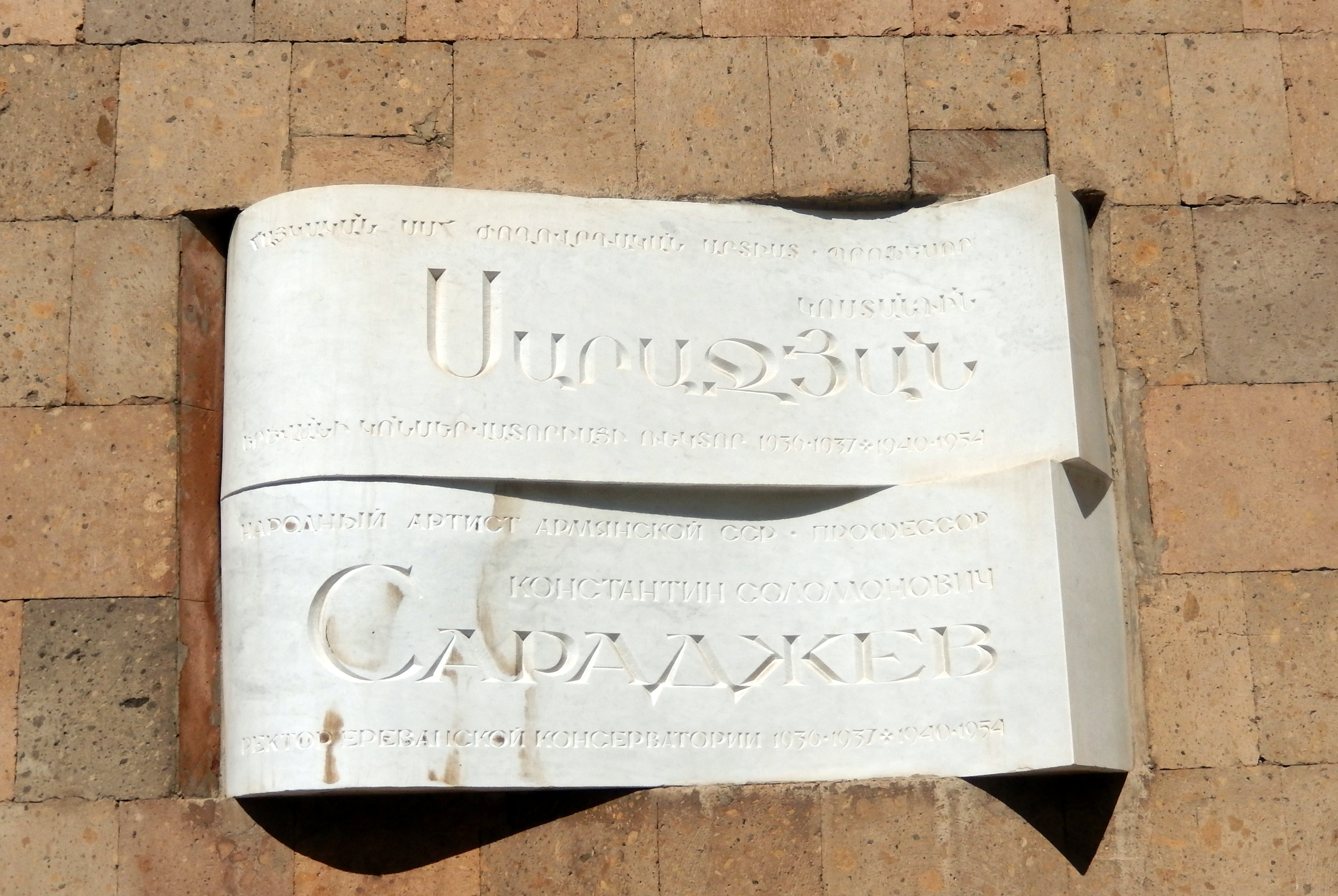
Kostantin Sarajev plaque in Yerevan

Saradzhev was an advocate of new music. In 1901 he was a member of a circle of Scriabinists that included the pianist and teacher Aleksandr Goldenweiser, the pianist Maria Nemenova-Lunts, the writer and critic Vladimir Derzhanovsky and others. In 1909 Derzhanovsky, his wife Elena Koposova-Derzhanovskaya and Saradzhev organized "Evenings of Modern Music" in Moscow. He conducted the first professional and first fully rehearsed performance of Stravinsky's Symphony in E flat, Op. 1 (Moscow, 22 August 1912, in the very first concert ever devoted entirely to Stravinsky's music).

Saradzhev conducted the premiere of Sergei Prokofiev's Piano Concerto No. 1 (25 July/7 August 1912; with the composer as soloist). Prokofiev later wrote that Saradzhev "realized splendidly all my tempos".

Saradzhev served in the army in World War I, not returning to Moscow until after the Russian Civil War. He became involved with the Association for Contemporary Music and founded the Evenings of Contemporary Music in 1923. He was professor of conducting at Moscow Conservatory 1922-35, where his notable students included Boris Khaikin and Lev Oborin.

Saradzhev conducted the first Soviet performance of Prokofiev's 3rd Piano Concerto (22 March 1925, Orchestra of the Theatre of the Revolution; soloist Samuil Feinberg). In 1927 he conducted the Moscow premiere of Shostakovich's Symphony No. 2 To October, which followed the world premiere under Nicolai Malko in Leningrad on 5 November, and was the first performance to include the revisions that Shostakovich had made after that premiere.

He was a leading advocate of Nikolai Myaskovsky's music. He conducted the first performances of Myaskovsky's symphonic poem Silence, Op. 9 (which was dedicated to him), and his symphonies No. 8 (Moscow, 23 May 1926), No. 9 (Moscow, 29 April 1928), and No. 11 (16 January 1933). Myaskovsky's Symphony No. 10 was dedicated to Saradzhev. In 1934 Myaskovsky wrote a Preludium and Fughetta on the name Saradzhev (for orchestra, Op. 31H; he also arranged it for piano 4-hands, Op. 31J).

The world premiere of the revised version of Prokofiev's Sinfonietta in A major, Op. 5/48 was under Konstantin Saradzhev's baton (Moscow, 18 November 1930).

He was a conductor of the Voronezh State Symphony Orchestra and in 1931 – this was 38 years after the composer died and 65 years after it was written – Pyotr Ilyich Tchaikovsky's Concert Overture in C minor finally received an airing, under Saradzhev's baton in Voronezh.

He later became musical director and principal conductor of the Yerevan Opera and Ballet Theatre. In September 1939 he conducted the premiere of Aram Khachaturian's first ballet Happiness. From 1939 until his death he was director of the Yerevan Conservatory, and taught the orchestra, opera and conducting classes. His notable students there included Alexander Kopylov. He was principal conductor of the Armenian Philharmonia 1941-44.

He died in Yerevan in 1954, aged 76. Konstantin and Zoya Saradzhev are buried at Yerevan's Central Cemetery, his memorial is a unique work of Art made of basalt.

== Honours ==
Konstantin Saradzhev was made a Hero of Labour in 1921 and a People's Artist of the Armenian Soviet Socialist Republic in 1945.

== Sources ==
- (True) Synesthete Composers and Musicians
