= Foreign Service Journal =

Monthly periodical for American diplomatic staff

- Type: Monthly
- Format: Magazine
- Owner(s): American Foreign Service Association
- Editor: Shawn Dorman
- Founded: 1924
- Headquarters: 2101 E Street NW; Washington, DC U.S. 20037
- Website: http://www.afsa.org/fsj/

The Foreign Service Journal is a monthly publication of the American Foreign Service Association. It covers foreign affairs from the perspective of American Foreign Service personnel, members of Washington's foreign policy establishment, as well as features on living overseas as a foreign affairs professional. The publication currently has a circulation of 17,500 with approximately 35,000 readers.

== History ==
The American Foreign Service Association was preceded by The American Consular Service Association which was founded in the spring of 1918. In March 1919 the American Consular Service Association published the first issue of the American Consular Bulletin. The diplomatic and consular branches of the State Department were combined into a single Foreign Service by the Rogers Act of 1924 and, as a result, the American Consular Service Association gave way to the American Foreign Service Association. It was decided to continue the monthly American Consular Bulletin as the official publication of the expanded association. In 1924, with the publication of the October issue, the title of the bulletin was changed to American Foreign Service Journal. The publication's name was shortened to its present form, the Foreign Service Journal, with the publication of the August, 1951, issue.
