= Joseph E. Jacobs =

American diplomat

Joseph Earle Jacobs
- Jacobs

United States Ambassador to Czechoslovakia
- In office 1948 – June 1949
- President: Harry S. Truman

United States Ambassador to Poland
- In office 1955–1957
- President: Dwight D. Eisenhower

Personal details
- Born: 1893 Johnston, South Carolina, U.S.
- Died: January 5, 1971 Washington, D.C., U.S.
- Education: College of Charleston
- Occupation: Diplomat

Joseph Earle Jacobs (born 1893, Johnston, South Carolina, died January 5, 1971, Washington, DC) was a US diplomat.

He was a recess appointment as Ambassador in Czechoslovakia from late 1948 until he was replaced in June 1949. Later he was the US ambassador to Poland (from 1955 to 1957) at the time of the Poznań upheaval of workers in 1956. From 1949 to 1955, Jacobs was Special Assistant for the Mutual Defense Assistance Program in Rome.

Jacobs graduated from the College of Charleston in 1913. They awarded him a LL.D. in 1953.
