= Abraham C. Ratshesky =

American politician

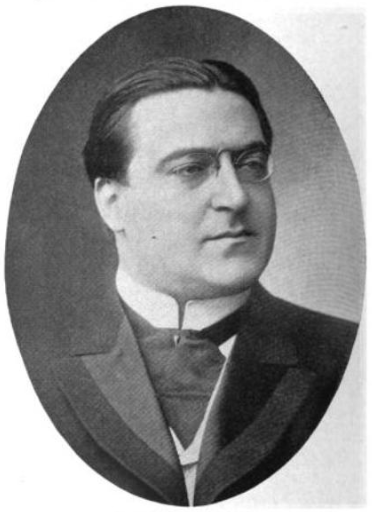

Member of the Massachusetts Senate
- In office 1892–1895

Personal details
- Born: Abraham Captain Ratshesky; November 6, 1864 Boston, Massachusetts
- Died: March 15, 1943 (aged 78) Boston, Massachusetts
- Party: Republican
- Spouse: Edith Ratshesky
- Occupation: Banker

Abraham Captain "Cap" Ratshesky (November 6, 1864 – March 15, 1943) was a banker who was the founder of the United States Trust Company, social activist, representative to the Massachusetts General Court and the United States Minister to Czechoslovakia (1930-1932).

== Biography ==
Ratshesky was born in Boston in 1866, the son of Jewish immigrants Asher and Bertha Ratshesky. He attended Boston Latin School but did not graduate. Ratshesky and his wife Edith lived in the Back Bay of Boston and at their home, The Birches, in Beverly.

== Philanthropy ==
He was one of the founders of Beth Israel Hospital, donated the building that became the first headquarters of the Boston chapter of the Red Cross, helped organize assistance to Halifax after the Halifax Explosion, and was treasurer of the "Pennies Campaign" in the 1920s to help save the USS Constitution.

== Career ==
Originally wholesale clothiers in their father's firm, Ratshesky and his brother Israel founded the United States Trust Company in 1895 as "the Jewish bank" because of the "needs of the rising immigrant population by providing access to capital and banking services not otherwise available to these individuals." Abraham served as President and Israel served as Treasurer. He served as a Massachusetts State Senator from 1892-1895 and as a delegate to the Republican National Conventions in 1892, 1904, 1908, 1916, and 1924. He also served three terms on the Boston Common Council.

He died at Beth Israel Hospital on March 15, 1943.

== See also ==
- 114th Massachusetts General Court (1893)
