= Mauritania–United States relations =

- Mauritania: United States

Mauritania–United States relations are bilateral relations between Mauritania and the United States.

== Overview ==
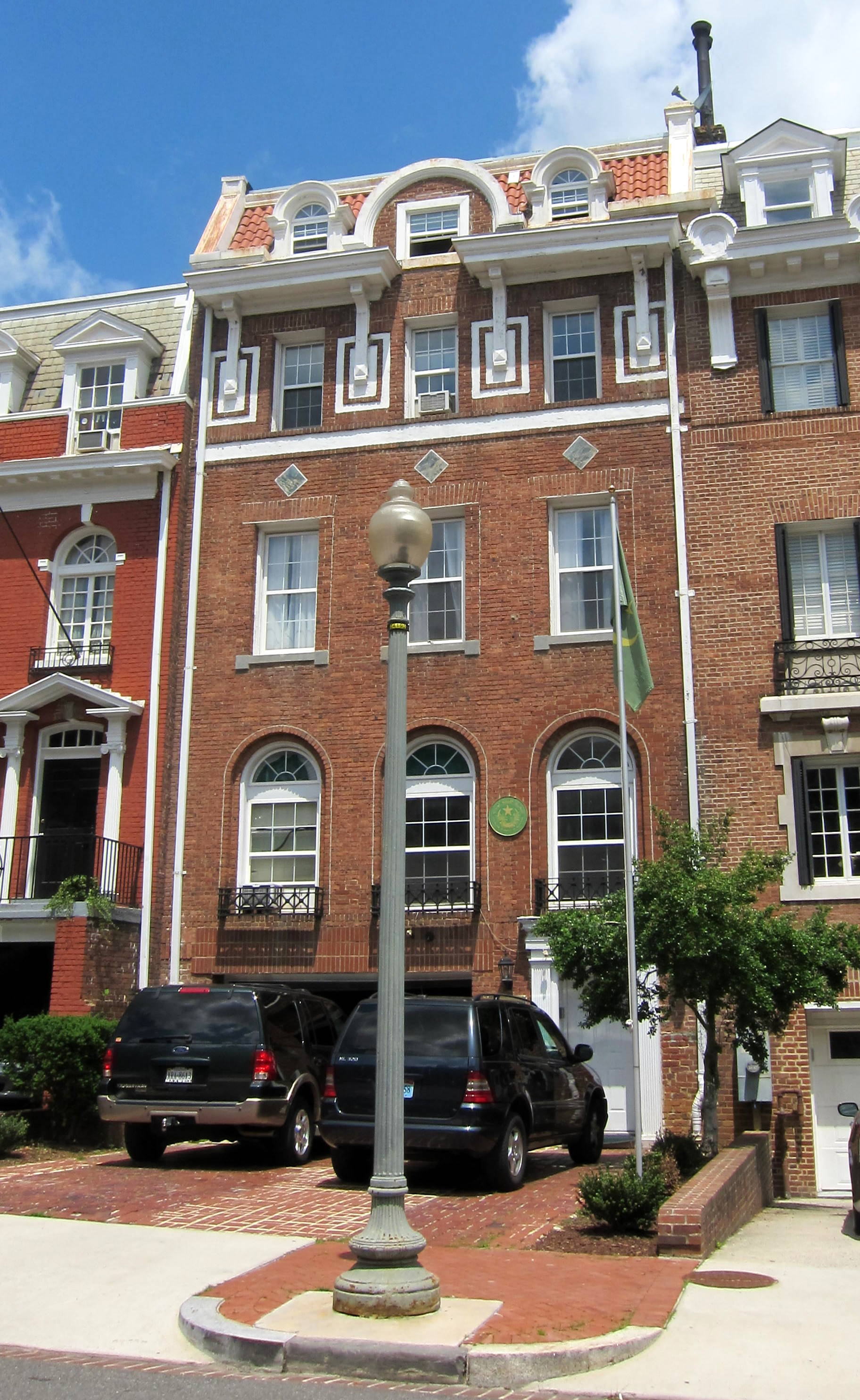
Embassy of Mauritania in Washington, D.C.

After Mauritania gained independence on 28 November 1960, the United States maintained cordial relations with Mauritania and provided a small amount of economic assistance. During the Six-Day War in June 1967, Mauritania broke diplomatic and consular relations with the United States, but restored ties two years later and maintained relatively positive relations until the late 1980s, despite disagreement over the Arab–Israeli conflict. Since 1981, the United States has provided about $130 million in economic and food assistance.

The 1989 rupture between Mauritania and Senegal (the "1989 Events") that resulted in Mauritania's deportation of tens of thousands of its own citizens to Senegal, negatively affected U.S.-Mauritanian relations. Moreover, Mauritania's perceived support of Iraq prior to and during the 1991 Gulf War further weakened the strained ties.

Relations between the U.S. and Mauritania reached a low in the spring of 1991, as details of the Mauritanian military's role in widespread human rights abuses surfaced. The U.S. responded by formally halting USAID operations and all military assistance to Mauritania. Relations also suffered in the 1990s as a result of repeated reports that slavery continued in some parts of Mauritania despite legal proscriptions.

By the late 1990s, the Mauritanian government adopted policies facilitating the return of those expelled or who fled during the 1989 Events; turned away from Iraq and toward the West; and initiated a poverty reduction strategy while securing debt relief under the Highly Indebted Poor Countries (HIPC) initiative. Improved relations with the United States, including the return of military cooperation and training programs, accompanied these changes. Mauritania formally opened diplomatic relations with Israel in 2000 and remains one of only three Arab League member-nations to have done so.

The U.S. condemned the August 2005 coup and the unconstitutional assumption of power by the Military Council for Justice and Democracy, and called for a return to a constitutional government through free and fair elections as soon as possible. The U.S. Government supports Mauritania's transition to democracy, and supported the 2006 parliamentary election and 2007 presidential election. The United States provided election-related assistance for voter education, political party training, and democracy building. The U.S. now aims to work with the Mauritanian Government to expand bilateral cooperation in the areas of food security, health, education, security, strengthening democratic institutions, and counterterrorism. There is a U.S. Embassy in Nouakchott, Mauritania.

== Previous United States Ambassadors to Mauritania ==
- Cynthia Kierscht
- Michael Dodman
- Larry André Jr.
- Jo Ellen Powell
- Mark Boulware
- Joseph LeBaron
- John Limbert
- Richard W. Murphy
- Edward Peck
