= Somalia–United States relations =

- Somalia: United States

Somalia–United States relations (Somali: Xiriirka Maraykanka-Soomaaliya; Arabic: علاقات صومالية أمريكية) are bilateral relations between the Federal Republic of Somalia and the United States of America. Somalia has an embassy in Washington, D.C., and the United States maintains an embassy in Mogadishu which was reopened in late 2019.

== History ==
In 1897, the Geledi Sultanate sent a high-profile delegation to New York under their foreign minister Khalid Aden Mohammed and signed the Indian Ocean Naval Treaty to combat Zanzibar slave trading.

The State Department sent two diplomats to Mogadishu in 1956 to establish a diplomatic post and on July 1, 1957, the United States Consulate-General in Mogadishu opened. The consulate was an offshoot of the US embassy to Italy. At the time, Mogadishu was the capital of the Trust Territory of Somalia, a United Nations Trust Territory under Italian administration that was scheduled to become independent in 1960. In addition to establishing a presence, the consulate staff were also charged with political research and developing relations with future Somali leaders.

On July 1, 1960, the Trust Territory of Somalia (the former Italian Somaliland) became independent and united, as planned, with the briefly extant State of Somaliland (the former British Somaliland) to form the Somali Republic (Somalia). The United States recognized and established diplomatic relations with the Somali Republic.

During the 1964 Ethiopian-Somali War, the United States government supported the Ethiopian Empire against the Somali Republic. US Air Force transport aircraft delivered military aid to the Ethiopian army. Military assistance during the conflict included deployment of US army combat training teams and the construction of an air base close to the Somali border. The United States abandoned its usual position of neutrality in the Ethiopia-Somali dispute soon after fighting in the Ogaden escalated into a full-scale border conflict. The scale of American support to Ethiopia was significant enough that the U.S. embassy in Mogadishu sent a cable cautioning Washington that if the full extent of American involvement in the conflict was discovered, there would be a serious political fallout with Somalia.

In early 1977 the US government accused Somalia along with several Arab nations of being state sponsors of terrorism. The Somali government, after stating that supporting national liberation movements against colonialism was no synonymous with supporting terrorism, refuted the accusations as being, "Zionist and imperialist propaganda". During the 1970s, the United States had made an offer to sell arms Somalia prior to the Ogaden War against Ethiopia. This offer was withdrawn following the news of Somali troops operating with the Western Somali Liberation Front in the Ogaden Region. Due to what was deemed the "illegal nature of Somali action", the Carter administration refused even to permit shipment of American weaponry from allied nations to the Somalis during the war. After the Ogaden War, the Americans began supplying the Somali army. From 1979 to 1983, Somalia had imported US$30 million worth of American arms. Only in the aftermath of Ethiopia's 1982 invasion was US military aid to Somalia significantly increased.

The US had been courting the Somali government for some time on account of Somalia's strategic position at the mouth of the Bab el Mandeb gateway to the Red Sea and the Suez Canal.

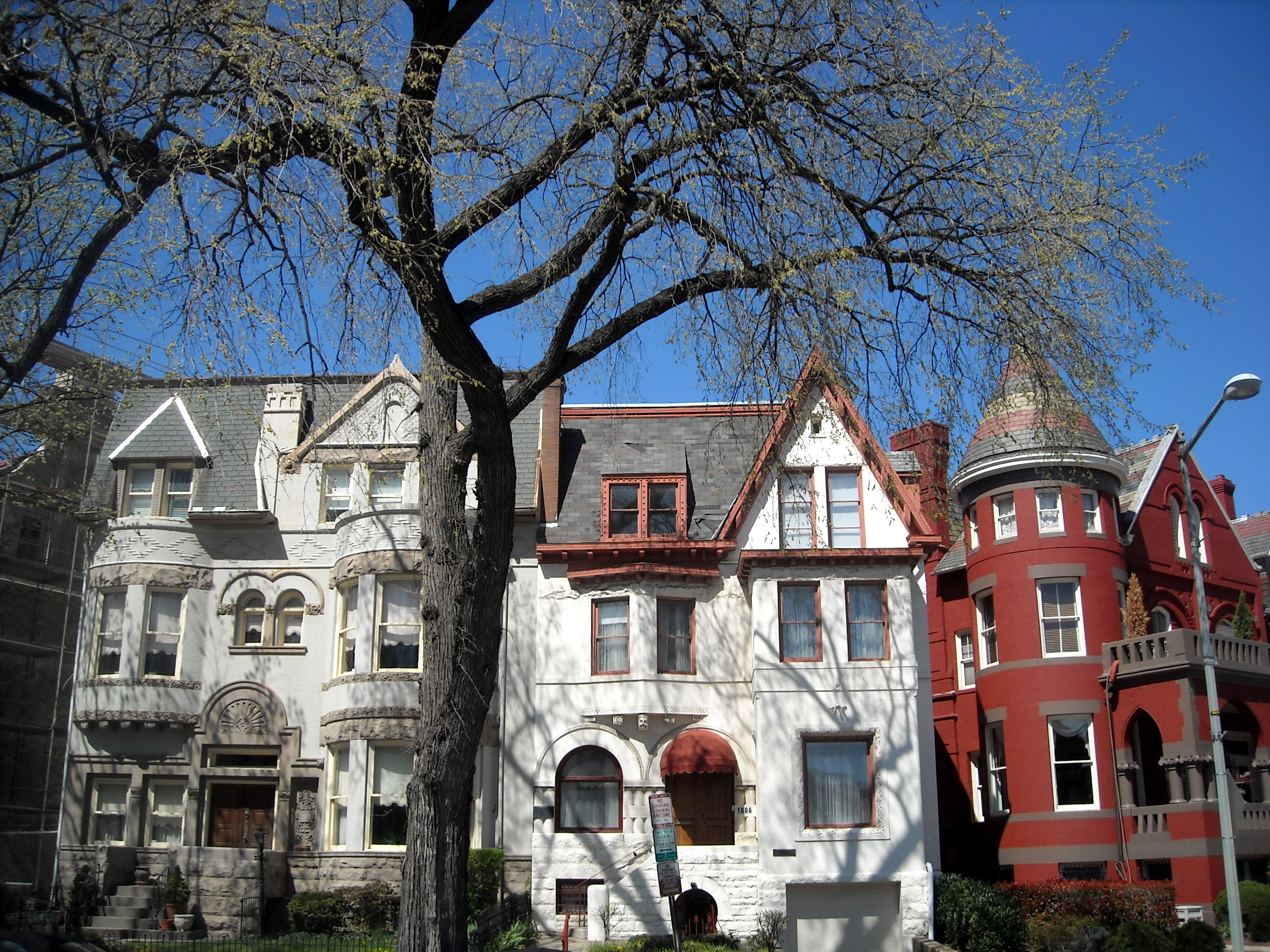
Former Somalia embassy in Washington, D.C.

After the collapse of the Barre government and the start of the Somali Civil War in the early 1990s, the United States embassy in Mogadishu was evacuated and closed down. However, the American government never formally severed diplomatic ties with Somalia, leading the UN-sanctioned multinational Unified Task Force (UNITAF) in southern Somalia. Following the establishment of the Transitional Federal Government (TFG) in 2004, the U.S. also acknowledged and supported the internationally recognized TFG as the country's national governing body. It likewise engaged Somalia's regional administrations, such as Puntland and Somaliland, to ensure broad-based inclusion in the peace process.

After taking over Mogadishu from CIA backed warlords in 2006, the Islamic Courts Union (ICU) sent a cable to Washington stating that they were not a "Taliban-type" movement and had no interest in being enemies with the United States. The US government backed and directly participated in the Ethiopian invasion of Somalia aimed at regime change against the ICU in the following months.

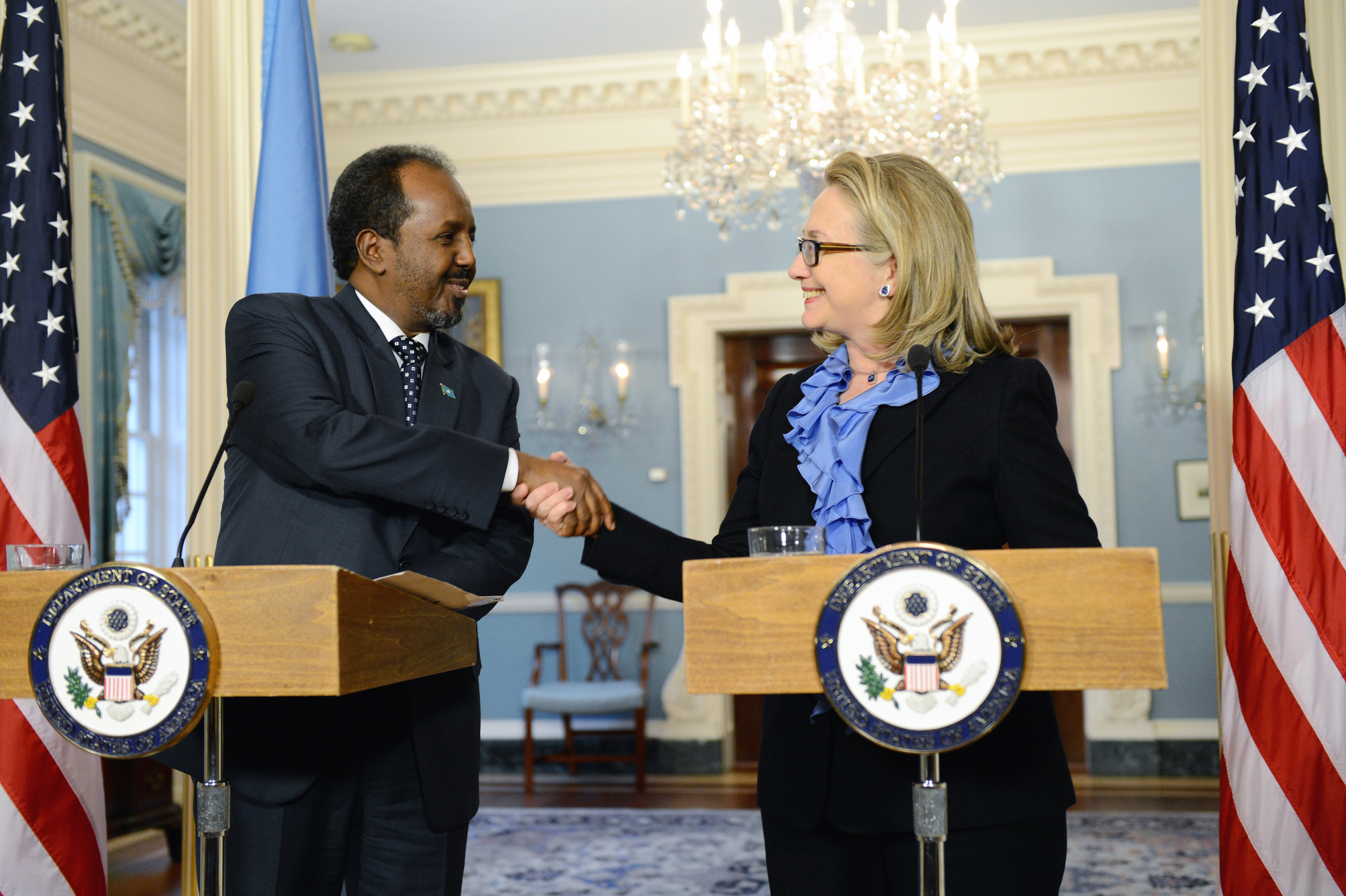
President of Somalia Hassan Sheikh Mohamud with U.S. Secretary of State Hillary Clinton at the State Department (January 2013).

The Federal Government of Somalia was established on August 20, 2012, concurrent with the end of the TFG's interim mandate. It represents the first permanent central government in the country since the start of the civil war. On September 10, 2012, the new Federal Parliament also elected Hassan Sheikh Mohamud as the incumbent President of Somalia. The election was welcomed by the U.S. authorities, who re-affirmed United States' continued support for Somalia's government, its territorial integrity and sovereignty.

In January 2013, the U.S. announced that it was set to exchange diplomatic notes with the new central government of Somalia, re-establishing official ties with the country for the first time in 20 years. According to the Department of State, the decision was made in recognition of the significant progress that the Somali authorities had achieved on both the political and war fronts. The move is expected to grant the Somali government access to new sources of development funds from American agencies as well as international bodies like the International Monetary Fund and World Bank, thereby facilitating the ongoing reconstruction process.

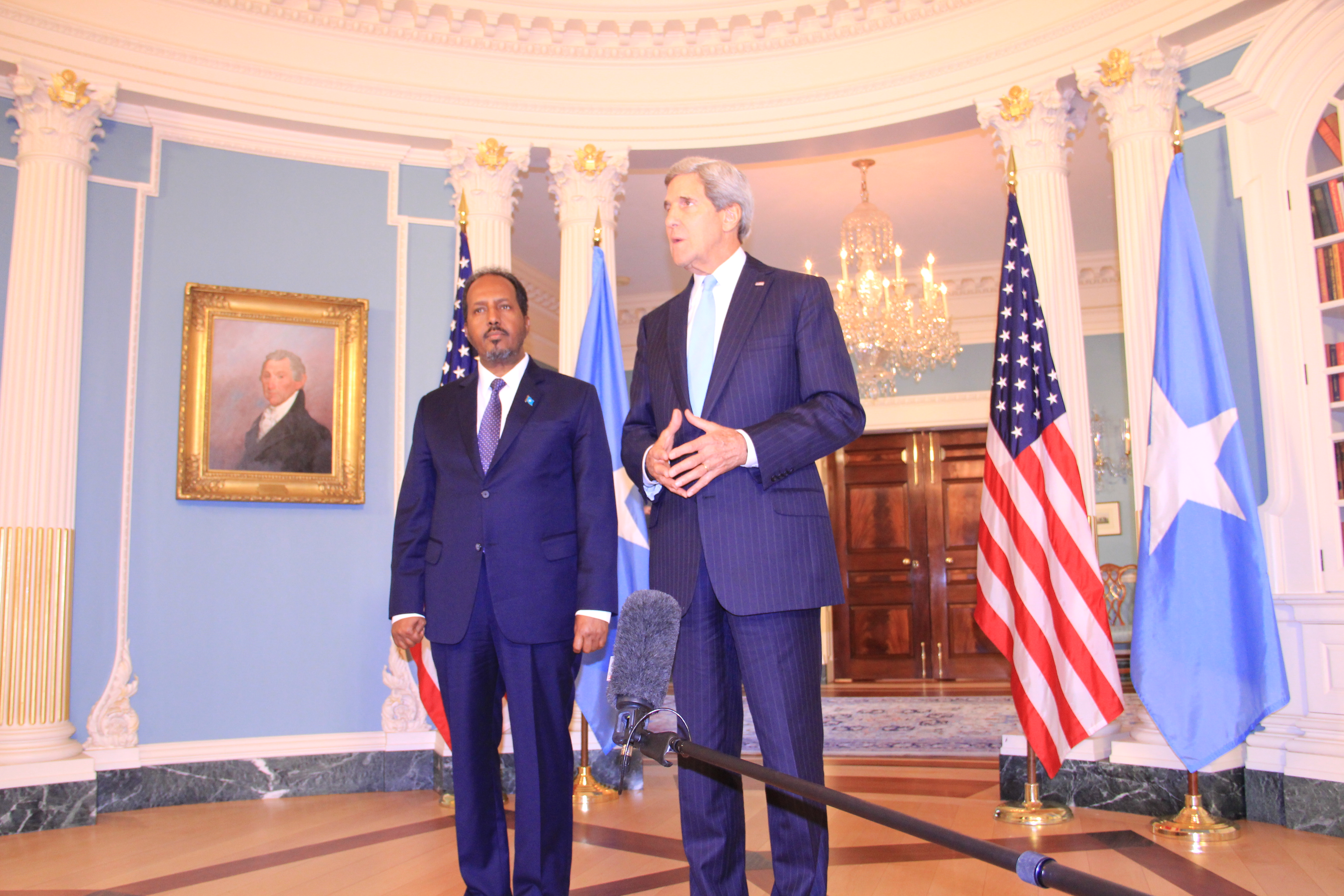
President of Somalia Hassan Sheikh Mohamud with U.S. Secretary of State John Kerry at the State Department (September 2013).

At the behest of the Somali and American federal governments, among other international actors, the United Nations Security Council unanimously approved United Nations Security Council Resolution 2093 during its 6 March 2013 meeting to suspend the 21-year arms embargo on Somalia. The endorsement officially lifts the purchase ban on light weapons for a provisional period of one year, but retains certain restrictions on the procurement of heavy arms such as surface-to-air missiles, howitzers and cannons. On April 9, 2013, the U.S. government likewise approved the provision of defense articles and services by the American authorities to the Somali Federal Government. At the request of the Somali authorities and AMISOM, the U.S. military in late 2013 also established a small team of advisers in Mogadishu to provide consultative and planning support to the allied forces.

On 5 May 2015, President of Somalia Hassan Sheikh Mohamud, Prime Minister Omar Abdirashid Ali Sharmarke, and other senior Somali government officials met with US Secretary of State John Kerry in Mogadishu. The bilateral meeting was the first ever visit to Somalia by an incumbent US Secretary of State. It served as a symbol of the ameliorated political and security situation in the country. The officials focused on the benchmarks enshrined within Somalia's Vision 2016 political roadmap, as well as cooperation in the security sector.

In January 2017, after President Donald Trump took office, Somali citizens were temporarily banned from entering the United States by the executive order "Protecting the Nation From Foreign Terrorist Entry Into the United States". This included Somali refugees who were willing to resettle in the United States through the US refugee admissions program.

In March 2017, after the election of Somali-American dual citizen Mohamed Abdullahi Mohamed as the next Somali President, US Secretary of State Rex Tillerson congratulated the president-elect, said he looked forward to strengthening the relationship between Somalia and the United States, and said that the recent elections marked an important milestone in Somalia's ongoing transition to peace, stability, and prosperity.

During a meeting of his cabinet on 2 December 2025, President Trump said that Somalia "stinks", that Somali American representative Ilhan Omar and other Somali immigrants are "garbage", and that "They contribute nothing... When they come from hell and they complain and do nothing but bitch, we don’t want them in our country. Let them go back to where they came from and fix it." When questioned about these remarks by reporters the following day, Trump doubled down on his opinions, stating that Somalia is "not even a nation. It’s just people walking around killing each other", that Somalian immigrants "have destroyed Minnesota", and that "Somalia is considered by many to be the worst country on Earth." When asked about Trump's remarks, prime minister Hamza Abdi Barre stated on 3 December "We are not the only country that Trump insults" and "Sometimes it's better not to respond".

On 8 January 2026, the Under Secretary of State for Foreign Assistance, Humanitarian Affairs, and Religious Freedom said that it would pause further assistance that benefits the Somali government, amid disputes over the demolition of a US-funded World Food Programme (WFP) warehouse and illegally seized donor-funded food aid for vulnerable Somalis.

On 13 January 2026, Department of Homeland Security (DHS) secretary Kristi Noem announced an end to the temporary protected status (TPS) granted to Somalis living in the US, effective 17 March 2026. TPS was first granted to Somalis during the Somali Civil War in 1991, and had been repeatedly renewed.

On 6 June 2026. Somali football referee Omar Artan—selected to referee the 2026 FIFA World Cup—was denied entry into the USA despite having secured a valid U.S. visa and receiving a diplomatic passport facilitated by the Somali Embassy in Nairobi.

== Trade and partnerships ==
The United States has continued to be one of the main suppliers of armaments to the Somali National Army (SNA). In June 2009, the reconstituted SNA received 40 tonnes worth of arms and ammunition from the U.S. government to assist it in combating the Islamist insurgency within southern Somalia. The U.S. administration also pledged more military equipment and material resources to help the Somali authorities firm up on general security.

Additionally, the two countries engage in minor trade and investment. The United States exports legumes, grain baking-related commodities, donated products and machinery to Somalia. Somalia in turn exports precious stones and low-value shipments to the United States.

=== Somaliland ===
In March 2025, Somalia's breakaway region of Somaliland rejected Somalia's offer to give the United States exclusive control over the Berbera port and airbase. Somaliland, which declared independence in 1991, views the facilities as its own and not Somalia's to offer. The strategic Berbera port, located on the Gulf of Aden, is operated by the UAE's DP World. Somalia's President Hassan Sheikh Mohamud had proposed the deal in a letter to US President Donald Trump, suggesting that these assets would strengthen US security operations in the region. However, Somaliland's government dismissed the offer, citing the territory’s de facto independence and its ongoing hope for international recognition.

== Diplomatic missions ==
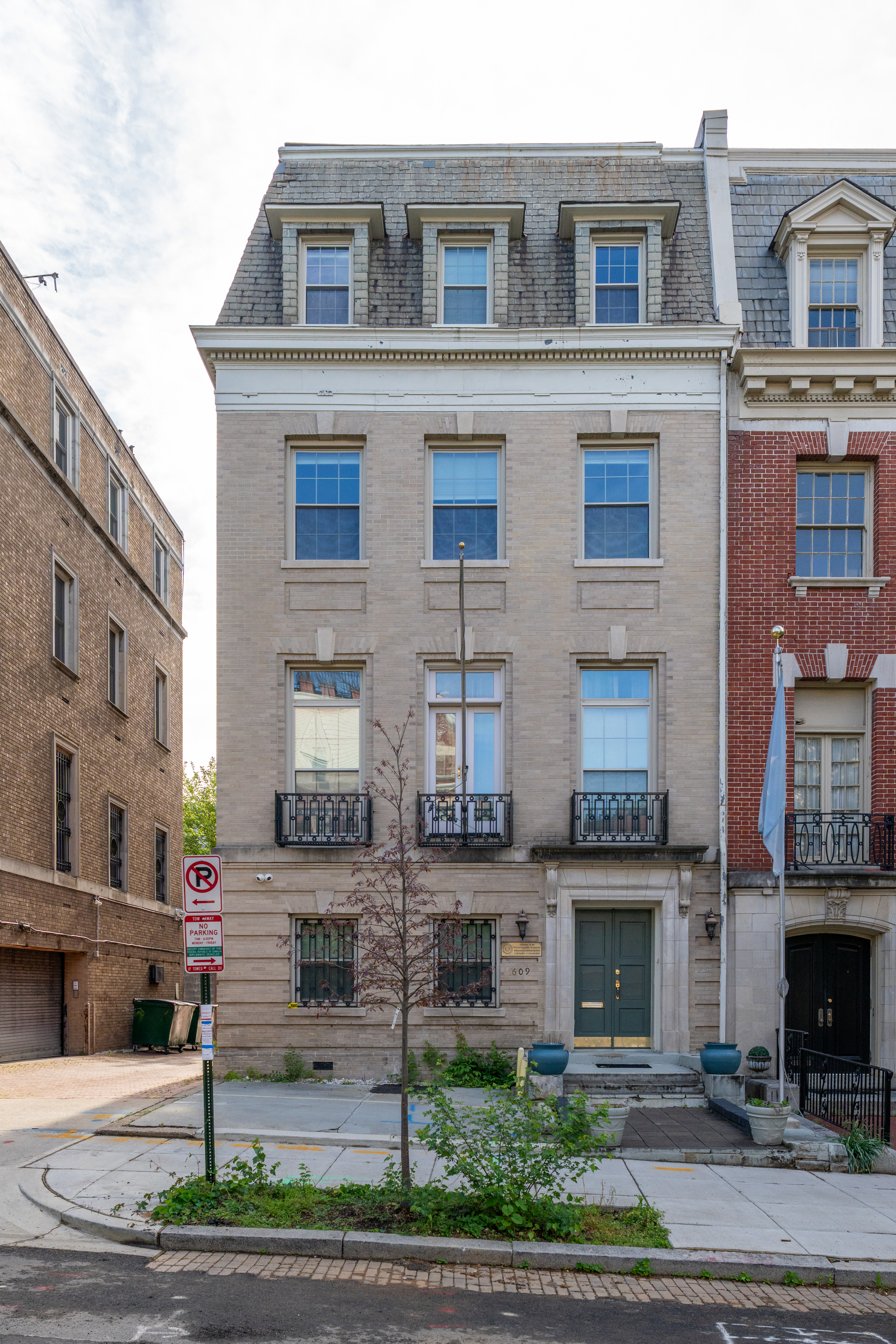
Embassy of Somalia in Washington, D.C.

Somalia maintains an embassy in Washington, D.C. Between July and December 2014, the diplomatic mission was led by Omar Abdirashid Ali Sharmarke, who served as Somalia's first Ambassador to the United States since 1991. As of April 2015, Fatuma Abdullahi Insaniya is the Ambassador of Somalia to the United States. The Somaliland region also has a Liaison Office in Washington, D.C.

The US opened a Consulate-General in Mogadishu in 1957, the capital of the Trust Territory of Somaliland, a UN trusteeship under Italian administration. The consulate was upgraded to embassy status in July 1960, when the US recognized Somalia's independence and appointed an ambassador. It later closed down in January 1991, following the start of the civil war. The US also operated a consulate in Hargeisa in northwestern Somalia in the 1960s. In June 2014, in what she described as a gesture of the deepening relations between Washington and Mogadishu and faith in Somalia's stabilization efforts, U.S. Undersecretary of State Wendy Sherman announced that the United States would reopen its diplomatic mission in Mogadishu at an unspecified future date. In February 2015, U.S. President Barack Obama nominated Foreign Service veteran Katherine Simonds Dhanani to become the new Ambassador of the United States to Somalia. Dhanani later withdrew her nomination in May of the year, citing personal reasons.

In May 2015, in recognition of the sociopolitical progress made in Somalia and its return to effective governance, US Secretary of State John Kerry announced a preliminary plan to reestablish the US embassy in Mogadishu. He indicated that although there was no set timetable for the premises' relaunch, the US government had immediately begun upgrading its diplomatic representation in the country. President of Somalia Hassan Sheikh Mohamud and Prime Minister Omar Abdirashid Ali Sharmarke also presented to Kerry the real estate deed for land reserved for the new US embassy compound. In November 2015, Somalia re-opened its embassy in Washington, DC.

In December 2018, the United States reopened a "permanent diplomatic presence" in Mogadishu. The new mission will not be a full embassy and some diplomatic staff are expected to remain at the US Embassy in Nairobi, Kenya where the U.S. Mission to Somalia is based. Larry Andre Jr served as U.S. ambassador to Somalia until May 2023. Richard H. Riley IV is current American ambassador to Somalia.

== See also ==
- Embassy of the United States, Mogadishu
- Foreign relations of Somalia
- Foreign relations of the United States
- United States Ambassador to Somalia
- Somaliland–United States relations
- CIA activities in Somalia
