= List of ambassadors of the United States to Djibouti =

Ambassador of the United States to Djibouti
- السفارة الأميركية فى جيبوتى
- Seal of the United States Department of State

- Flag of a United States ambassador

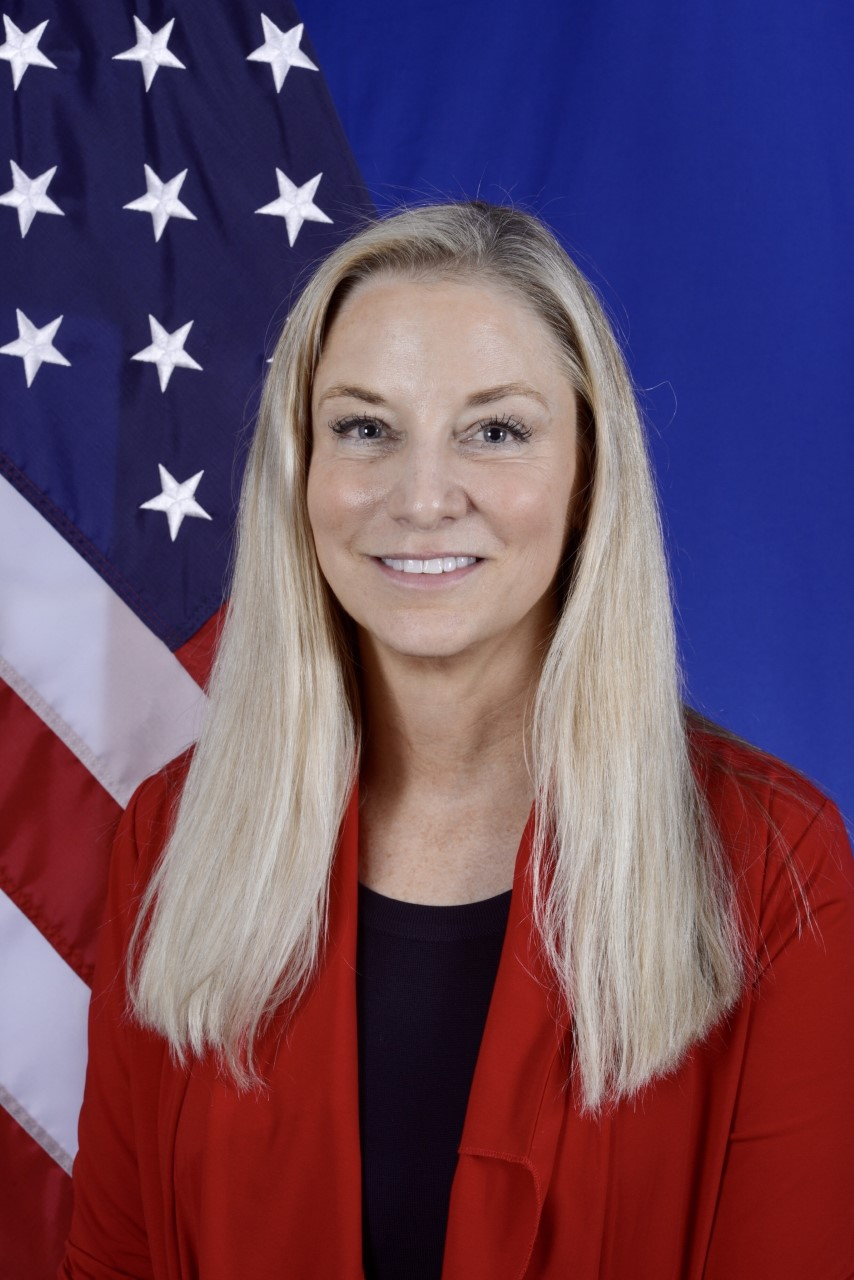
- Incumbent; Cynthia Kierscht since October 17, 2024
- Nominator: The president of the United States
- Appointer: The president; with Senate advice and consent
- Inaugural holder: Jerrold M. North as Ambassador Extraordinary and Plenipotentiary
- Formation: September 26, 1980
- Website: U.S. Embassy - Djibouti

This is a list of ambassadors from the United States to the Republic of Djibouti.

The area on the Horn of Africa on which Djibouti is situated had been under French control since 1885 as part of the protectorate of French Somaliland. The area was ruled by the Vichy (French) government from the fall of France in 1940 until December 1942, but Free French and the Allied forces recaptured Djibouti at the end of 1942. In 1957 the colony was given a large measure of self-government and became the French Territory of the Afars and the Issas. In a May 1977 referendum the populace chose independence from France. The Republic of Djibouti was established on June 27, 1977.

The United States immediately recognized the nation of Djibouti and moved to establish diplomatic relations. The embassy in Djibouti was established June 27, 1977, with Walter S. Clarke as Chargé d'Affaires ad interim pending the appointment of an ambassador. The first ambassador, Jerrold M. North, was appointed on September 26, 1980.

== Ambassadors ==
Name	Title	Appointed	Presented credentials	Terminated mission	Notes
Jerrold M. North – Career FSO	Ambassador Extraordinary and Plenipotentiary	September 26, 1980	October 27, 1980	August 27, 1982	
Alvin P. Adams Jr. – Career FSO	Ambassador Extraordinary and Plenipotentiary	April 28, 1983	July 16, 1983	August 20, 1985	
John Pierce Ferriter – Career FSO	Ambassador Extraordinary and Plenipotentiary	August 1, 1985	September 30, 1985	August 27, 1987	The post was vacant August 1987–September 1988. John E. McAteer served as Chargé d'Affaires ad interim during that period.
Robert South Barrett IV – Career FSO	Ambassador Extraordinary and Plenipotentiary	July 11, 1988	September 5, 1988	April 18, 1991	
Charles R. Baquet III – Career FSO	Ambassador Extraordinary and Plenipotentiary	March 25, 1991	October 10, 1991	December 9, 1993	
Martin L. Cheshes – Career FSO	Ambassador Extraordinary and Plenipotentiary	November 22, 1993	January 19, 1994	July 30, 1996	President Clinton’s nomination of Stanley Schrager of May 6, 1996, was withdrawn and he was not appointed. The post was vacant July 1996–January 1998. During that period the following officers served as Chargés d’Affaires ad interim: Joseph Philippe Gregoire (July–September 1996) and Terri Robl (September 1996–January 1998).
Lange Schermerhorn – Career FSO	Ambassador Extraordinary and Plenipotentiary	November 10, 1997	January 26, 1998	November 17, 2000	
Donald Y. Yamamoto – Career FSO	Ambassador Extraordinary and Plenipotentiary	September 15, 2000	December 9, 2000	June 16, 2003	
Marguerita Dianne Ragsdale – Career FSO	Ambassador Extraordinary and Plenipotentiary	December 12, 2003	February 23, 2004	July 6, 2006	
W. Stuart Symington – Career FSO	Ambassador Extraordinary and Plenipotentiary	August 18, 2006	September 18, 2006	May 31, 2008	
James C. Swan	Ambassador Extraordinary and Plenipotentiary	August 6, 2008	November 10, 2008	June 30, 2011	
Geeta Pasi	Ambassador Extraordinary and Plenipotentiary	July 5, 2011	September 12, 2011	August 30, 2014	
Thomas P. Kelly III	Ambassador Extraordinary and Plenipotentiary	August 18, 2014	October 13, 2014	January 15, 2017	
Larry André Jr.	Ambassador Extraordinary and Plenipotentiary	November 20, 2017	February 19, 2018	January 20, 2021	
Jonathan Pratt	Ambassador Extraordinary and Plenipotentiary	December 15, 2020	February 22, 2021	May 18, 2023	
Andrea Tomaszewicz	Chargé d’Affaires	May 19, 2023		June 9, 2023	
Mario Fernandez	Chargé d’Affaires	June 9, 2023		October 2, 2023	
Christopher Snipes	Chargé d’Affaires	October 2, 2023		October 17, 2024	
Cynthia Kierscht	Ambassador Extraordinary and Plenipotentiary	May 2, 2024	October 17, 2024	Incumbent	

== See also ==
- Djibouti – United States relations
- Foreign relations of Djibouti
- Ambassadors of the United States
