= Donald Yamamoto =

American diplomat (born 1953)

Donald Y. Yamamoto
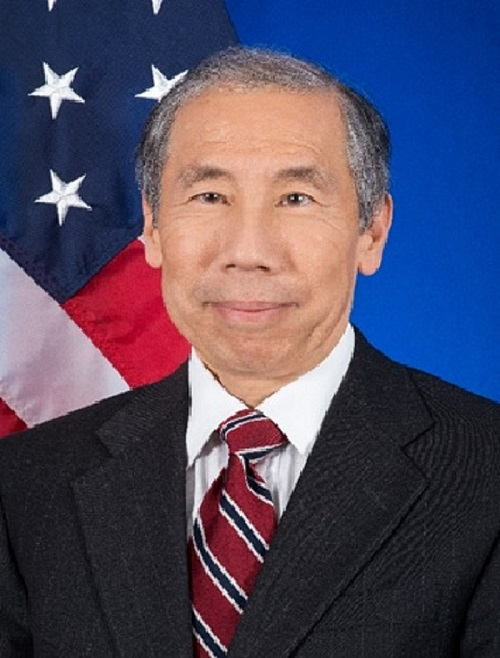

United States Ambassador to Somalia
- In office November 17, 2018 – July 2021
- President: Donald Trump; Joe Biden
- Preceded by: Stephen Schwartz
- Succeeded by: Larry André Jr.

Assistant Secretary of State for African Affairs
- Acting
- In office September 3, 2017 – July 23, 2018
- President: Donald Trump
- Preceded by: Linda Thomas-Greenfield
- Succeeded by: Tibor P. Nagy
- In office March 30, 2013 – August 5, 2013
- President: Barack Obama
- Preceded by: Johnnie Carson
- Succeeded by: Linda Thomas-Greenfield

United States Ambassador to Ethiopia
- In office November 9, 2006 – July 28, 2009
- President: George W. Bush; Barack Obama
- Preceded by: Vicki J. Huddleston
- Succeeded by: Donald E. Booth

United States Ambassador to Djibouti
- In office September 15, 2000 – June 16, 2003
- President: Bill Clinton; George W. Bush
- Preceded by: Lange Schermerhorn
- Succeeded by: Marguerita Dianne Ragsdale

Charge d’Affaires ad interim to Eritrea
- In office May 11, 1997 – June 29, 1998
- President: Bill Clinton
- Preceded by: John F. Hicks
- Succeeded by: William Davis Clarke

Personal details
- Born: Donald Yukio Yamamoto; 1953 (age 72–73) Seattle, Washington
- Children: 2
- Education: Columbia University (BA, MIA)
- Occupation: Diplomat
- Awards: Superior Honor Award (4)

Donald Yukio Yamamoto (Japanese: 山本 幸生, born 13 March 1953) is an American diplomat who served as the United States ambassador to Somalia from 2018 to 2021. Before that he was the acting Assistant Secretary of State for African Affairs, with a term of appointment starting September 3, 2017 until July 23, 2018. Yamamoto previously served as the Senior Vice President of International Programs and Outreach at the National Defense University from 2016 to 2017. Prior to that, he was senior advisor to the Director General of the Foreign Service on personnel reform from 2015 to 2016; he served as Chargé d'Affaires at the U.S. Mission Somalia office in Mogadishu in 2016; and in senior positions in Kabul, Mazar e-Sharif, and Bagram, Afghanistan from 2014 to 2015.

He was the former acting Assistant Secretary of State for African Affairs from March 30, 2013 to August 5, 2013, U.S. ambassador to Ethiopia from 2006 to 2009 and Principal Deputy Assistant Secretary within the Bureau of African Affairs. He was appointed by President George W. Bush in November 2006 and presented his credentials to Ethiopian Prime Minister Meles Zenawi in Addis Ababa on December 6, 2006. He was formerly the U.S. ambassador to Djibouti from 2000 to 2003 and Chargé d’Affaires ad interim for Eritrea from 1997 to 1998.

== Early life and education ==
Yamamoto was born in Seattle, Washington to a Japanese immigrant father and a Nisei mother. Yamamoto later graduated from Columbia College of Columbia University in 1975 and School of International and Public Affairs, Columbia University in 1978.

Yamamoto entered the United States Foreign Service in 1980, serving primarily in Africa, with assignments in the Middle East and Asia, including U.S. Embassy Beijing (as staff aide to the Ambassador and Human Rights Officer during the Tiananmen Square demonstrations in 1989), and U.S. Consulate Fukuoka (as Principal Officer, 1992-1995). He received a master's degree from the National War College in 1996 and worked on Capitol Hill on a Congressional Fellowship in 1991.

He is the recipient of a Presidential Distinguished Service Award, Presidential Meritorious Service Award, Secretary's Distinguished Honor Award, over a dozen Senior Performance Awards, the State Department's 2006 Robert Frasure Memorial Award for advancing conflict resolution in Africa, and numerous other awards. He is also one of the youngest diplomats to be promoted to the rank of Career Minister.

== Diplomatic career ==
=== U.S.-Chadian relations ===
From April 22–23, 2006, Yamamoto met with current Chadian President Idriss Déby to discuss Chad's dispute with the World Bank over allocation of its petroleum funds and the possibility of a U.S.-led, United Nations-monitored peace keeping force to end the Chadian-Sudanese conflict.

The Government of Chad repeatedly accused the Government of Sudan of complicity in United Front for Democratic Change incursions from Darfur into eastern Chad. Yamamoto is the first official in any government outside of Chad to repeat this claim, saying, "It is evident that there was safe haven and logistical support provided to rebel groups."

Chad produces around 100,000 bpd (barrels of oil per day, 2013 figures) which travels through the Chad-Cameroon pipeline, owned and operated by US companies ExxonMobil and Chevron and Malaysian Petronas. The Déby administration threatened to cut off the supply of oil at the end of April if the international community did not intervene to end the rebellion or if ExxonMobil did not pay the government $100 million. The dispute was later resolved, and Chad's oil continues to flow to other countries.

==== Chadian-Sudanese conflict ====
Yamamoto tried unsuccessfully to convince President Déby to delay the upcoming presidential election which was held on May 3. He later said, "We held a very direct and private discussion on the issue [of whether to postpone the election]... When people say that it's too late to delay an election... it's never too late to do anything. We must focus on what is important... to have a process in place and actual ability of all the people to participate in the process. Any election that doesn't have full participation of all groups then raises issues that they would have to answer for."

=== U.S.-Ethiopian relations ===
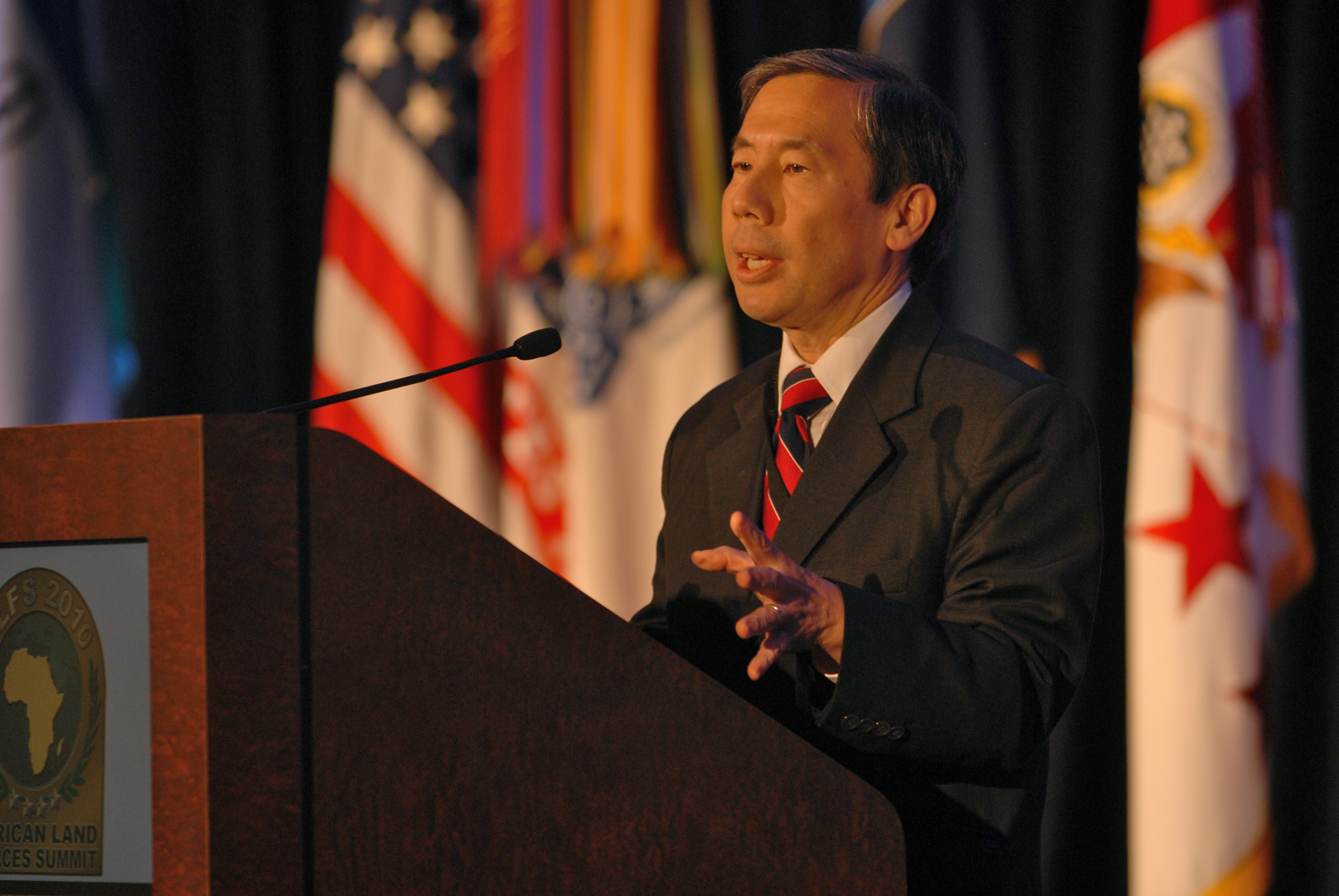
Yamamoto in 2010

Yamamoto met with Ethiopian Prime Minister Meles Zenawi on April 22, 2006, to discuss the ongoing process of democratization in Ethiopia and the Ethio-Eritrea boundary dispute. Both leaders were positive about the outcome of the meeting. In 2010, Yamamoto stated that the 2006 Ethiopian invasion of Somalia had been a mistake and "not a really good idea". In 2021 a widely circulated video showed Yamamoto consulting with a TPLF representative on TPLF's military operation to overthrow the Ethiopian government.

=== Assistant secretary of state ===
Yamamoto became acting Assistant Secretary of State for African Affairs on March 30, 2013, replacing Johnnie Carson.

=== U.S. ambassador to Somalia ===
On 14 July 2018, President Donald Trump nominated Donald Yamamoto as the United States ambassador to Somalia. Yamamoto was subsequently confirmed for the position on 19 October 2018. While the US Mission to Somalia is based on the grounds of the US Embassy in Nairobi, Kenya, a permanent diplomatic mission was established in Mogadishu in December 2018.

== Personal life ==
Yamamoto speaks Japanese, Chinese and French.

Diplomatic posts
Preceded by Lange Schermerhorn	United States Ambassador to Djibouti; 2000–2006	Succeeded by Marguerita Dianne Ragsdale
Preceded by Stephen Schwartz	United States Ambassador to Somalia; 2018–2021	Succeeded by Larry André Jr.
Political offices
Preceded by Johnnie Carson	United States Assistant Secretary of State for African Affairs; 2013	Succeeded by Linda Thomas-Greenfield
Preceded by Linda Thomas-Greenfield	United States Assistant Secretary of State for African Affairs; 2017–2018	Succeeded by Tibor P. Nagy
