= List of ambassadors of the United States to Mauritania =

Ambassador of the United States to Mauritania
- Seal of the United States Department of State

- Flag of a United States ambassador

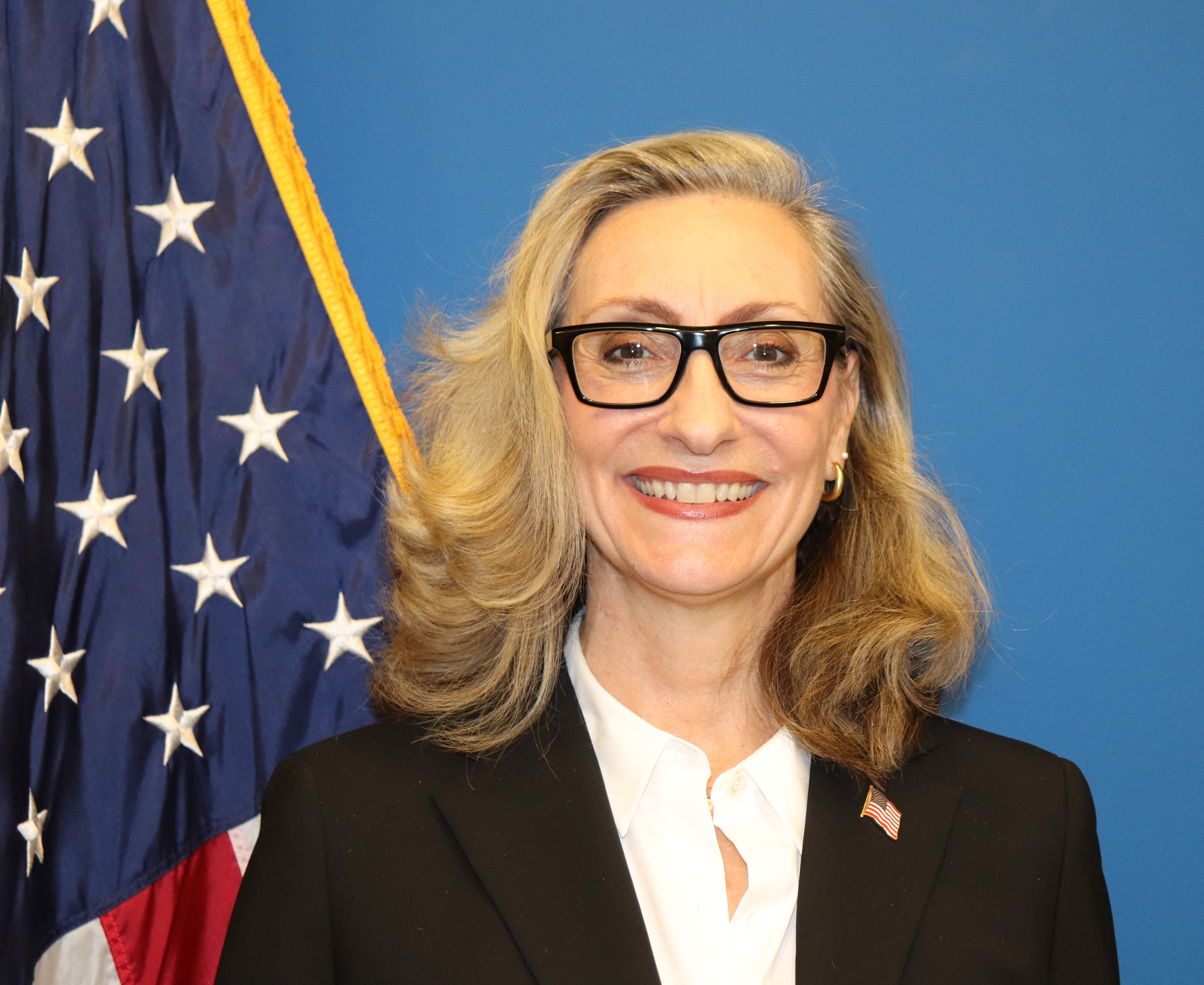
- Incumbent; Corina R. Sanders; Chargé d'affaires since October 9, 2025
- Nominator: The president of the United States
- Appointer: The president with Senate advice and consent
- Inaugural holder: Henry S. Villard
- Formation: November 28, 1960
- Website: U.S. Embassy - Nouakchott

The United States embassy in Mauritania is located in Nouakchott. Mauritania – United States relations have been developing since 1960.

== Ambassadors ==
- Henry S. Villard – Career FSO
  - Title: Envoy Extraordinary and Minister Plenipotentiary.
  - Resident in, and concurrent US Ambassador to, neighbouring Senegal
  - Appointed: November 28, 1960
  - Terminated mission: Left post, April 30, 1961
- Philip M. Kaiser – Career FSO
  - Title: Envoy Extraordinary and Minister Plenipotentiary.
  - Resident in, and concurrent US Ambassador to, neighbouring Senegal
  - Appointed: August 1, 1961
  - Terminated mission: Left post, May 18, 1964
- William L. Eagleton Jr – Career FSO
  - Title: Envoy Extraordinary and Minister Plenipotentiary. Ad Interim
  - Appointed: 1962
  - Terminated mission: 1964
- Geoffrey W. Lewis – Career FSO
  - Title: Envoy Extraordinary and Minister Plenipotentiary.
  - Appointed: March 31, 1965
  - Terminated mission: Left post, June 9, 1967
- Robert A. Stein – Career FSO
  - Title: Envoy Extraordinary and Minister Plenipotentiary.
  - Appointed: March 1970
  - Terminated mission: Left post, November 1971
- Richard W. Murphy – Career FSO
  - Title: Envoy Extraordinary and Minister Plenipotentiary.
  - Appointed: December 17, 1971
  - Terminated mission: Left post, June 5, 1974
- Holsey G. Handyside – Career FSO
  - Title: Envoy Extraordinary and Minister Plenipotentiary.
  - Appointed: April 15, 1975
  - Terminated mission: Left post, December 5, 1977
- E. Gregory Kryza – Career FSO
  - Title: Envoy Extraordinary and Minister Plenipotentiary.
  - Appointed: December 16, 1977
  - Terminated mission: Left post, June 29, 1980
- Stanley N. Schrager – Career FSO
  - Title: Envoy Extraordinary and Minister Plenipotentiary. Ad Interim
  - Appointed: September 1980
  - Terminated mission: Left post, July 1982
- Edward Brynn – Career FSO
  - Title: Envoy Extraordinary and Minister Plenipotentiary. Ad Interim
  - Appointed: July 1982
  - Terminated mission: Left post, February 1983
- Edward Lionel Peck – Career FSO
  - Title: Envoy Extraordinary and Minister Plenipotentiary.
  - Appointed: February 19, 1983
  - Terminated mission: Left post, July 7, 1985
- Robert L. Pugh – Career FSO
  - Title: Envoy Extraordinary and Minister Plenipotentiary.
  - Appointed: September 5, 1985
  - Terminated mission: Left post, July 5, 1988
- William H. Twaddell – Career FSO
  - Title: Envoy Extraordinary and Minister Plenipotentiary.
  - Appointed: October 6, 1988
  - Terminated mission: Left post, July 20, 1991
- Gordon S. Brown – Career FSO
  - Title: Envoy Extraordinary and Minister Plenipotentiary.
  - Appointed: September 5, 1991
  - Terminated mission: Left post, August 18, 1994
- Dorothy Myers Sampas – Career FSO
  - Title: Envoy Extraordinary and Minister Plenipotentiary.
  - Appointed: November 3, 1994
  - Terminated mission: Left post, July 4, 1997
- Timberlake Foster – Career FSO
  - Title: Envoy Extraordinary and Minister Plenipotentiary.
  - Appointed: November 11, 1997
  - Terminated mission: Left post, October 3, 2000
- John W. Limbert – Career FSO
  - Title: Envoy Extraordinary and Minister Plenipotentiary.
  - Appointed: November 21, 2000
  - Terminated mission: Left post, August 8, 2003
- Joseph LeBaron – Career FSO
  - Title: Envoy Extraordinary and Minister Plenipotentiary.
  - Appointed: September 1, 2003
  - Terminated mission: November 22, 2007
- Mark Boulware – Career FSO
  - Title: Envoy Extraordinary and Minister Plenipotentiary.
  - Appointed: November 22, 2007
  - Terminated mission: Left post, May 6, 2010
- Jo Ellen Powell – Career FSO
  - Title: Envoy Extraordinary and Minister Plenipotentiary.
  - Appointed: October 10, 2010
  - Terminated mission: Left post, December 12, 2013
- Larry André Jr. – Career FSO
  - Title: Envoy Extraordinary and Minister Plenipotentiary
  - Nominated: January 6, 2014
  - Appointed: September 25, 2014
  - Presentation of credentials: November 3, 2014
  - Terminated mission: Left post, November 17, 2017
- Michael Dodman – Career FSO
  - Title: Envoy Extraordinary and Minister Plenipotentiary
  - Nominated: July 27, 2017
  - Appointed: November 20, 2017
  - Presentation of credentials: March 13, 2018
  - Terminated mission: February 2021
- Cynthia Kierscht – Career FSO
  - Title: Envoy Extraordinary and Minister Plenipotentiary
  - Nominated: June 18, 2020
  - Appointed: January 27, 2021
  - Presentation of credentials: June 22, 2021
  - Terminated mission: July 9, 2024

== See also ==
- Mauritania – United States relations
- Foreign relations of Mauritania
- Ambassadors of the United States
