= Somaliland–United States relations =

- Somaliland: United States

Somaliland and the United States do not have official diplomatic relations. While Somaliland operates a representative office in Alexandria, Virginia, near Washington, D.C., it does not have diplomatic status under Vienna Convention on Diplomatic Relations. There has been contact between them as delegations from both sides have met in the past.

== History ==
The U.S. policy regarding Somaliland is to first allow the African Union to deliberate the question regarding the status of Somaliland as an independent nation. The United States engages Somaliland on policy matters such as democratization and economic development.

=== 1960 ===
In June 1960, during its brief period of independence, Somaliland garnered recognition from thirty-five sovereign states. However, the United States merely acknowledged Somaliland's independence:

The United States did not extend formal recognition to Somaliland, but Secretary of State Herter sent a congratulatory message dated June 26 to the Somaliland Council of Ministers.

United States Secretary of State Christian Herter sent the following letter:

June 26, 1960
Their Excellencies,
Council of Ministers of Somaliland, Hargeisa.

Your Excellencies:
I extend my best wishes and congratulations on the achievement of your independence. This is a noteworthy milestone in your history, and it is with pleasure that I send my warmest regards on this happy occasion.

Christian A. Herter
Secretary of State, United States of America

=== 2007 ===
In 2007, the United States provided one million dollars in aid through the International Republican Institute to support training for parliamentarians and other key programs in preparations for the 2010 Somaliland presidential election. The U.S. expected to provide an additional one point five million in continued support for the democratization process in Somaliland following the elections.

=== 2010 ===
From March 20 to March 28, 2010, a delegation of Somaliland senior ministers and parliamentarians visited the United States on an invitation from the U.S. The delegation met with senior officials of the National Security Council in the Executive Building of the White House. The delegation had multiple discussions with the leadership of the State Department's Africa Bureau including the Assistant Secretary of State for African Affairs, Principal Deputy Assistant Secretary of State for African affairs, and Deputy Assistant Secretary of State for East Africa. The meetings were also attended by senior officials from the U.S. Department of Defense and other relevant U.S. government bureaus and agencies. Both nations explored Somaliland's political status in light of the Djibouti Peace Process. Discussions revolved around religious extremism, terrorism, piracy, and the lack of adequate social and economic development. The U.S. side pledged its support and agreed to the creation of a joint follow-up group to monitor progress made. The delegation also had discussions with US-based private and non-profit organizations and multilateral donors such as USAID and the World Bank. The delegation emphasized areas that have the greatest impact on people's daily existence, such as clean potable water, improved agriculture, health, education, and rural development. The delegation concluded its visit meeting with the Somaliland community in Washington D.C.

On September 24, 2010, Johnnie Carson, the then-Assistant Secretary of State for African Affairs, stated that the United States would be modifying its strategy in Somalia and would seek deeper engagement with the governments of Somaliland and Puntland while continuing to support the Somali Transitional Government. Carson said the U.S. would send aid workers and diplomats to Puntland and Somaliland and alluded to the possibility of future development projects. However, Carson emphasized that the U.S. would not extend formal recognition to either region.

=== 2014 ===
In June 2014, Somaliland and the USAID inaugurated a new wind energy project at Hargeisa Airport. The new wind power facility is under the authority of the Somaliland Ministry of Energy and Mineral Resources, which will manage it through a public-private partnership and oversee its daily operations. The initiative is part of the larger Partnership for Economic Growth, a bilateral program that has invested over fourteen million dollars in Somaliland's energy, livestock and agriculture sectors as well as in private sector development. The partnership aims, in particular, to establish local renewable energy technologies, with the new wind energy facility expected to offer a more cost-effective alternative to diesel fuel. It is also slated to provide power to both the Hargeisa airport and the surrounding communities. The investment in building the airport came as a result of the USAID investing nearly fifty million dollars in Somaliland since 2010 in areas such as community stabilization, governance, education, health, and economic growth.

=== 2020 ===
In August 2020, the United States praised Somaliland and Taiwan for formalizing relations. In a post on Twitter, the United States National Security Council stated: "Great to see #Taiwan stepping up its engagement in East #Africa in a time of such tremendous need. #Taiwan is a great partner in health, education, technical assistance, and more!"

=== 2021 ===
In November 2021, for the first time members of the United States Congress met with a Somaliland delegation at the United States Capitol. Bashir Goth, the leader of the delegation who is the head of Somaliland Mission USA stated the purpose of the visit, "We have come to the U.S. to show them that we have the same enemy, and our long-term strategy is we want to be closer to democracies and market economies like the U.S. We are countering China [and] the Chinese influence in the Horn of Africa and we deserve [U.S. government] help." The delegation included Foreign Minister Essa Kayd and special envoy Edna Adan Ismail, the former Foreign Minister of Somaliland. One of the goals of the delegation was advocating for the U.S. to remove Somaliland from its inclusion in the State Department's "Level 4: Do not travel" classification for Somalia. Staffers for Senators Jim Risch, Lindsey Graham, and Representatives Chris Smith, Kay Granger, and Michael McCaul embarked on a fact-finding mission to find the strategic value of interacting with officials from Somaliland to counter China's reach in Africa which they concurred when they returned back home after they visited Somaliland the following month in December. American federal agencies that met with the delegation, USAID, Department of Defense, and the State Department. According to the State Department they, "expressed a willingness to explore opportunities to cooperate with Somaliland on issues of mutual interest." But the agencies made reference to Somaliland's strained relationship with Somalia and support for the "territorial integrity of the Federal Republic of Somalia" and urged a "mutually acceptable solution on the question of Somaliland's status." The meetings also did not discuss potential American military personnel or equipment.

=== 2022 ===
President of Somaliland, Muse Bihi Abdi visited the United States on March 14, 2022, marking the first time a leader of either country made a formal visit to the respective nations. Both Abdi and Foreign Minister Essa Kayd met with members of Congress and Biden administration officials. Bihi suggested the U.S. could open a diplomatic office in Somaliland's capital of Hargeisa. Both sides urged closer cooperation, but the U.S. stopped short of recognizing Somaliland. American officials fear recognizing Somaliland would destabilize relations with Somalia, other African nations, and the African Union, and that it may further escalate the ongoing conflict in Somalia. Abdi spoke at an event hosted by The Heritage Foundation arguing for closer ties and recognition from the U.S.

After meeting with Abdi and Kayd, Congressman Scott Perry (R‑PA 10th) introduced legislation to formally recognize Somaliland titled "Republic of Somaliland Independence Act". In March 2022, a watered-down version of the bill titled the "Somaliland Partnership Act" was introduced by Senator Jim Risch (R‑ID). While it did not explicitly recognize Somaliland as an independent country, it required "the Department of State to report to Congress on engagement with Somaliland". Additionally, the bill mandated a "feasibility study, in consultation with the Secretary of Defense, regarding the establishment of a partnership between the United States and Somaliland." Neither act became law but the Somaliland Partnership Act passed the Senate Foreign Relations Committee with bipartisan support.

On May 12, 2022, Larry André Jr., the American ambassador to Somalia, and General Stephen J. Townsend, Commander of the United States Africa Command met with Abdi in Hargeisa in what was described as the U.S not promoting the "secessionist ideology being pushed by Somaliland" in the context of the 2022 Somaliland presidential election and continuing the "single Somalia policy" while urging close cooperation between Somalia and Somaliland.

=== 2024 ===
Following Donald Trump's victory in the 2024 United States presidential election, former British defence secretary Gavin Williamson stated in an interview that, after lobbying on behalf of the country, he expected the president-elect would see to the recognition of Somaliland during his presidency.

=== 2025 ===
In January 2025, the U.S. House Select Committee on the CCP urged the State Department to establish a representative office in Somaliland in order to counter China's growing influence in the Horn of Africa. Chairman John Moolenaar (R‑MI 2nd) argued that such a move is vital for advancing U.S. strategic interests in the region. He noted that without U.S. engagement, China might sway Somaliland's interests, further consolidating its presence around the Red Sea. The committee highlighted that establishing an office in Hargeisa would not conflict with the U.S.'s current recognition of Somalia's government.

In March 2025, Somaliland rejected an offer from Somalia's government to grant the United States exclusive control over strategic facilities in Berbera, a port city located on the Gulf of Aden. Somaliland, which declared independence from Somalia in 1991, maintains that these facilities are not for Mogadishu to dispose of. The proposal, made by Somalian president Hassan Sheikh Mohamud in a letter to US president Donald Trump, included control over airbases and ports in Somalia and Somaliland to bolster US security efforts in the region. Somaliland’s Foreign Minister Abdirahman Dahir Adan dismissed the offer as "desperate," asserting that Somaliland’s growing independence would eventually lead to international recognition.

In June 2025, Congressman Scott Perry of Pennsylvania introduced legislation to formally recognize the Republic of Somaliland. In August 2025, Senator Ted Cruz of Texas, who chairs the Senate Foreign Relations Subcommittee on Africa, called for the United States to formally recognize the Republic of Somaliland.

After Israel formally recognised Somaliland as an independent state on 26 December 2025, when asked about his position on recognizing Somaliland, Trump said "Just say, No, comma, not at this, Just say, No." Later stating "Does anyone know what Somaliland is, really?" adding "We'll study it. I study a lot of things and always make great decisions and they turn out to be correct." The US State Department also later said that it continues to recognize Somalia's territorial integrity, which includes the territory of Somaliland.

== See also ==
- Foreign relations of Somaliland
- Foreign relations of the United States
- Somalia–United States relations
