= Robert Barrett =

Robert or Bob Barrett may refer to:

- Bob Barrett (American football) (born 1935), American football player
- Bob Barrett (baseball) (1899–1982), American baseball infielder
- Bob Barrett (politician) (born 1967), Minnesota state representative
- Rob Barrett (born 1969), American guitarist for Cannibal Corpse
- Bob Barrett (actor) (born 1966), English stage and television actor
- Robert Barrett (athlete) (born 1957), British Paralympian
- Robert E. Barrett, former water company president and namesake of the Robert E. Barrett Fishway on the Connecticut River, United States
- Robert G. Barrett (1942–2012), Australian author
- Robert T. Barrett (born 1949), American illustrator
- Robert South Barrett IV (1927–2004), American ambassador
- Bob Barrett (Indigenous Australian) (c.1795–1833), Indigenous Australian convict hunter
- Robert Barrett (director), co-director of Beyond the Door

== See also ==
- Robert Barrat (1889–1970), American actor
