= Alvin P. Adams Jr. =

American diplomat

- Adams in Port-au-Prince in 1991

United States Ambassador to Djibouti
- In office July 16, 1983 – August 20, 1985
- President: Ronald Reagan
- Preceded by: Jerrold M. North
- Succeeded by: John Pierce Ferriter

United States Ambassador to Haiti
- In office October 10, 1989 – August 1, 1992
- President: George H. W. Bush
- Preceded by: Brunson McKinley
- Succeeded by: Leslie M. Alexander

United States Ambassador to Peru
- In office December 15, 1993 – August 16, 1996
- President: Bill Clinton
- Preceded by: Charles H. Brayshaw
- Succeeded by: Dennis C. Jett

Personal details
- Born: August 29, 1942 New York City
- Died: October 10, 2015 (aged 73) Portland, Oregon
- Education: Yale University, Vanderbilt University Law School

Alvin Philip Adams Jr. (August 29, 1942 – October 10, 2015) was an American diplomat.

== Biography ==
Born in New York City, he was one of three children born to Elizabeth Miller, daughter of Nathan L. Miller, and Alvin P. Adams Sr. His father was a Western Airlines executive. His mother owned a bookstore. The younger Adams attended Yale, like his father, and received a J.D. from Vanderbilt University Law School.

Adams joined the Foreign Service in 1967 and was appointed as the United States Ambassador to Djibouti in 1983 where he served until 1985. His next ambassadorship was to Haiti, where he convinced Prosper Avril to relinquish power in a late night conversation held in March 1990. In 1992, Adams was named ambassador to Peru, serving in that post until his retirement from the Foreign Service in 1996.

Adams also worked in Washington, D.C., for what became the Bureau of Counterterrorism before his Haiti stint and was posted in Vietnam prior to all ambassadorial assignments. There, he met his wife, Mai-Anh Nguyen. Before their divorce, they had two sons, Lex and Tung Thanh, who died in the 1989 USS Iowa turret explosion. Adams lived in Buenos Aires and Honolulu, then moved to Portland, Oregon in 2011, where he died on October 10, 2015, aged 73.

Diplomatic posts
| Preceded by Jerrold M. North | United States Ambassador to Djibouti; 1983–1985 | Succeeded by John Pierce Ferriter |
| Preceded by Brunson McKinley | United States Ambassador to Haiti; 1989–1992 | Succeeded by Leslie M. Alexander |
