= Charles R. Baquet III =

American diplomat (born 1941)

5th United States Ambassador to Djibouti
- In office October 10, 1991 – December 9, 1993
- Preceded by: Robert South Barrett IV
- Succeeded by: Martin L. Cheshes

Personal details
- Born: December 24, 1941 (age 84) New Orleans, Louisiana, U.S.
- Education: Xavier University of Louisiana (BA); Maxwell School of Citizenship and Public Affairs (MA)
- Profession: Diplomat

Charles R. Baquet III (born December 24, 1941 in New Orleans, Louisiana) was an American Career Foreign Service Officer who served as Ambassador Extraordinary and Plenipotentiary to Djibouti from 1991 until 1993. He served as the Deputy Director of the U.S. Peace Corps in South Africa.

== Biography ==
Baquet attended public schools in New Orleans and earned a B.A. in history from Xavier University in New Orleans in 1963. In 1975, he earned his M.A. in public administration from the Maxwell School of Government at Syracuse University.
