= Jonathan Pratt =

American diplomat

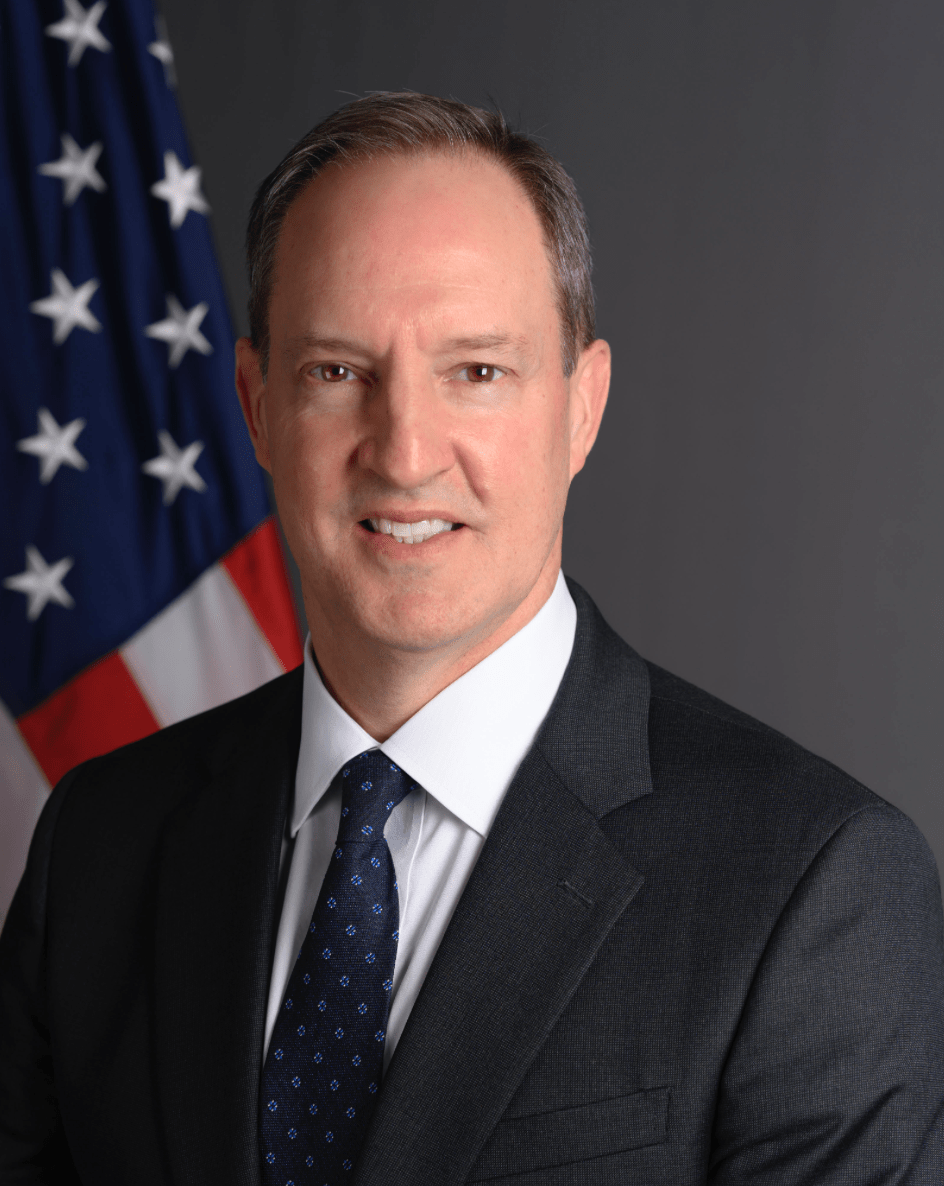

United States Ambassador to Djibouti
- In office February 22, 2021 – May 18, 2023
- Nominated by: Donald Trump
- Appointed by: Joe Biden
- Preceded by: Larry André Jr.
- Succeeded by: Cynthia Kierscht

Personal details
- Education: Wesleyan University (B.A.); University of California, San Diego (M.A.)

Jonathan Pratt is an American diplomat who had served as the United States Ambassador to Djibouti between 2021–2023.

== Early life and education ==
Pratt earned a Bachelor of Arts from Wesleyan University in Middletown, Connecticut and a Master of Arts from the University of California, San Diego.

== Career ==
Pratt is a career member of the Senior Foreign Service, class of Counselor. He has held assignments as the Deputy Chief of Mission of the United States Embassy in Islamabad, Pakistan, and as the Office Director for Pakistan Affairs in the State Department. He served earlier as the Political Counselor at the United States Embassy in Islamabad, as the Deputy Chief of Mission of the United States Embassy in Brazzaville, Republic of the Congo, and as the Political and Economic Section Chief at the United States Embassy in Khartoum, Sudan. Other assignments also include service at the United States Embassies in Angola, Jordan and the Democratic Republic of Congo.

On May 1, 2020, President Donald Trump announced his intent to nominate Pratt to be the next United States Ambassador to Djibouti. On May 19, 2020, his nomination was sent to the United States Senate. On August 5, 2020, a hearing was held on his nomination before the Senate Committee on Foreign Relations. On December 15, 2020, his nomination was confirmed in the Senate by voice vote. On February 22, 2021, Pratt presented his credentials to President Ismaïl Omar Guelleh.

== Personal life ==
Pratt speaks Chinese, Arabic, French, Spanish and Portuguese.

== See also ==
- List of ambassadors of the United States
- Embassy of the United States, Djibouti City

Diplomatic posts
Preceded by Larry André Jr.	United States Ambassador to Djibouti; 2021–2023	Succeeded by Cynthia Kierscht
