= Djibouti–United States relations =

- Djibouti: United States

Relations between Djibouti and the United States have existed since the independence of Djibouti in 1977, and the United States has had a diplomatic presence in the area since 1929, when it was French Somaliland. Cynthia Kierscht is the American ambassador to Djibouti and Mohamed Siad Doualeh is the Djiboutian ambassador to the United States.

== History ==
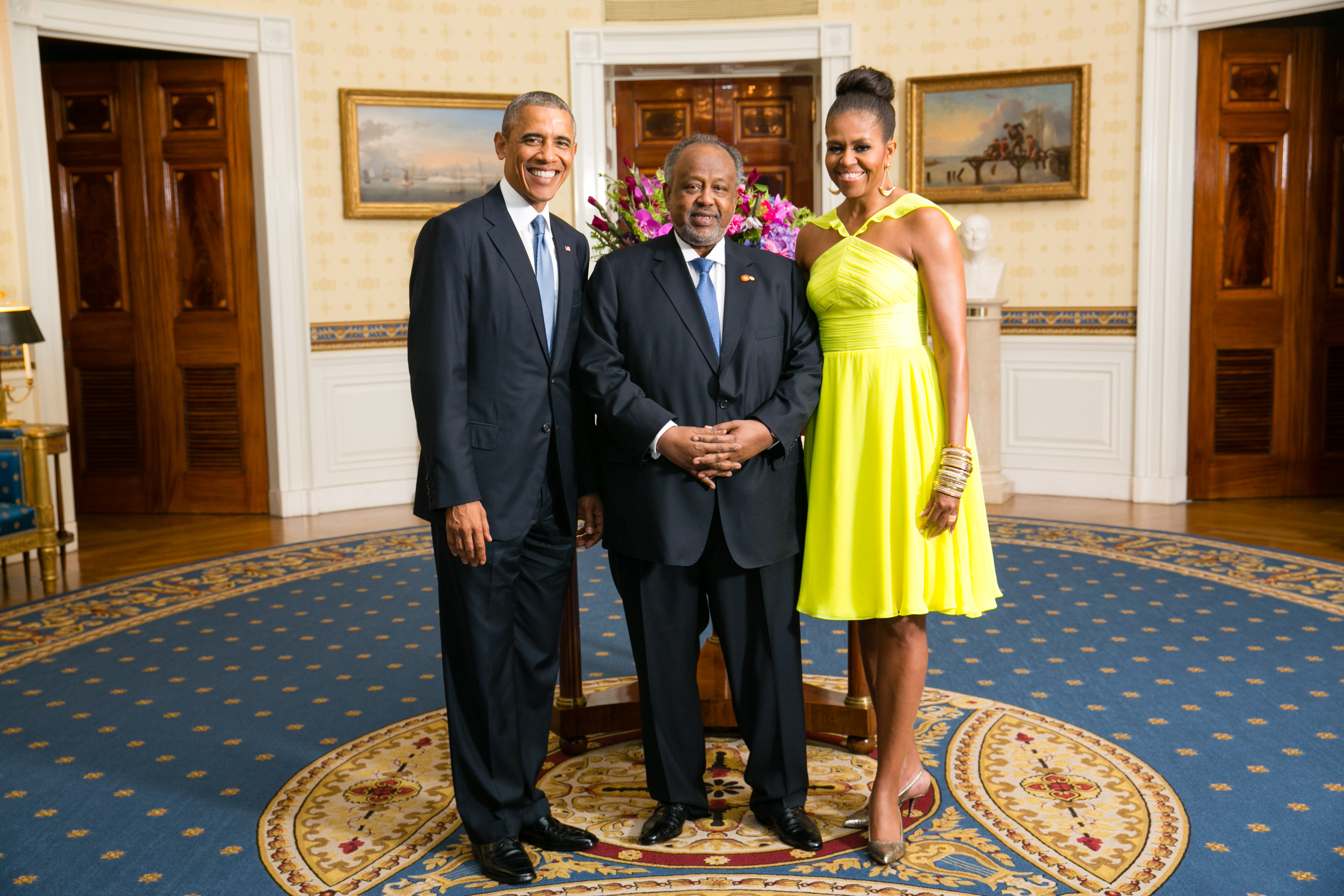
Djiboutian President Ismail Omar Guelleh with the Obamas at the White House, 2014

The United States opened a consulate in French Somaliland in 1929. The United States established diplomatic relations with Djibouti in 1977.

The United States provides financial support for malaria, polio, and HIV/AIDS prevention and treatment in Djibouti.

President Hassan Gouled Aptidon conducted an official state visit to the United States in 1991. President Ismaïl Omar Guelleh conducted official visits in 1999, 2003, and 2010. John Kerry's visit on 6 May 2015, made him the first United States Secretary of State to visit Djibouti.

Camp Lemonnier is the only permanent American military presence in Africa. In 2014, the U.S. reached a long-term agreement with the government of Djibouti to continue utilizing Camp Lemonnier. The U.S. military also uses airstrips in more remote parts of the country for drone operations. Outside of the base agreement, President Barack Obama also pledged to increase financial aid to Djibouti, including helping to expand skills training and foreign aid.

On 2 April 2025, U.S. President Donald Trump instituted a 10% tariff on goods from Djibouti.

Roble Olhaye served as Djibouti's ambassador to the United States from his appointment in 1988, to his death in 2015. Mohamed Siad Doualeh has been Djibouti's ambassador since 2016. Cynthia Kierscht has been the United States' ambassador to Djibouti since 2024.

== Embassy ==
Principal U.S. officials include:

- United States Ambassador to Djibouti – Cynthia Kierscht
- Deputy Chief of Mission - Christopher Snipes

== See also ==
- Foreign relations of the United States
- Foreign relations of Djibouti

== Works cited ==
=== News ===
- Bohannon, Molly (2 April 2025). "Here's The Full List Of Trump's Reciprocal Tariffs Announced Wednesday". Forbes. Archived from the original on 6 July 2025.

=== Web ===
- "Cynthia Kierscht U.S. Ambassador to Djibouti". U.S. Embassy in Djibouti. 17 October 2024. Archived from the original on 6 July 2025.
- "Djibouti-U.S. Relations". Embassy of the Republic of Djibouti in Washington, D.C. Archived from the original on 6 July 2025.
- "U.S. Relations With Djibouti". United States Department of State. 1 August 2016. Archived from the original on 6 July 2025.
