= Dorothy M. Sampas =

American diplomat

U.S. Ambassador to Mauritania
- In office November 3, 1994 – July 4, 1997
- President: Bill Clinton
- Preceded by: Gordon S. Brown
- Succeeded by: Timberlake Foster

Dorothy Myers Sampas (born 1933) is a retired American diplomat. She was the U.S. Ambassador to Mauritania from 1994 to 1997.

== Life and career ==
Dorothy Sampas was born in 1933 in Washington, D.C. She was educated at the University of Michigan and the University of Paris. She received her PhD from Georgetown University in 1970. She worked as a lobbyist in state legislature while an undergraduate student in Michigan, as well as a city editor for The Michigan Daily.

Sampas joined the State Department in 1957 after passing the Foreign Service exam. Her husband, whom she married in 1962, was also a Foreign Service Officer. Before her appointment as ambassador, Sampas was the vice-consul in Hamburg and minister-counselor of embassy in Beijing and to the U.S. mission to the United Nations. She also worked as an analyst for the Bureau of Administration and a division chief for multiple offices within the Department of State. In 1984, Sampas became the director of the Office of Management.

Sampas attended the National War College from 1986 to 1987, publishing The Role of the Department of State in the Foreign Policy Decision-Making Process after graduating. She also received a certificate from the Defense Resources Management Institute at the Naval Postgraduate School.

In 1989, Sampas's promotion to minister-counselor was confirmed by the U.S. Senate.

Sampas was appointed to be the U.S. ambassador to Mauritania on August 26, 1994. She was the first woman in this position. One of Sampas's main points of focus during her tenure was human rights and slavery. USAID, USIA, and the Marines were pulling out of Mauritania, leaving Sampas with very few officers working in the embassy in Nouakchott.

Sampas left Mauritania after having a brain aneurysm.

Sampas retired from the State Department in 1998. From 1999 to 2013, she volunteered at the Sibley Memorial Hospital. She was also a member of the Cosmos Club. In 2017, Sampas was awarded the Marquis Who's Who Lifetime Achievement Award.
