= Louis J. Nigro Jr. =

American diplomat

Louis J. Nigro, Jr.
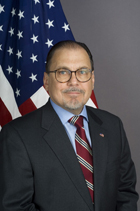
- Nigro in 2007

20th United States Ambassador to Chad
- In office November 16, 2007 – September 2010
- President: George W. Bush; Barack Obama
- Preceded by: Marc M. Wall
- Succeeded by: Mark M. Boulware

Personal details
- Born: May 19, 1947 Brooklyn, New York, U.S.
- Died: January 1, 2013 (aged 65) Washington, D.C., U.S.
- Spouse: Tarja Nigro
- Profession: Diplomat

Louis John Nigro, Jr. (May 19, 1947 – January 1, 2013) was an American diplomat. He was the United States Ambassador to Chad from 2007 to 2010.

== Biography ==
Louis Nigro was born in 1947. He joined the US Foreign Service in 1980. Prior to doing so, he received a PhD in Modern European History from Vanderbilt University, was a Fulbright-Hays Research Fellow in Italy, taught modern European history at Stanford University, and served as an officer in the California Army National Guard.

He saw diplomatic overseas positions at the US Embassies in The Bahamas, Chad, and Haiti. He was the Deputy Chief of Mission at The Holy See, Guinea, and Cuba. He also held positions in the Department of State's Operations Center, Policy Planning Council, Office of Western European Affairs, and Office of Canadian Affairs in Washington D.C.

Nigro won the Department of State's Superior Honor Award for his service in Haiti. From 2004 to 2006, he was Professor of International Relations at the U.S. Army War College. On September 4, 2007, Nigro was nominated by President George W. Bush to be the United States Ambassador to Chad. He was sworn in on November 16, 2007. On September 8, 2010, Mark M. Boulware was sworn in as the new Ambassador to Chad.

He retired from the U.S. Foreign Service in 2010 after 33 years of government service. He is the author of The New Diplomacy in Italy: American Propaganda and U.S.-Italian Relations, 1917–1919 and of scholarly articles on historical and diplomatic themes. He spoke French and Italian. Nigro died on January 1, 2013, from cancer.

Diplomatic posts
Preceded by Marc M. Wall	United States Ambassador to Chad; 2004–2007	Succeeded by Mark M. Boulware
