= Deborah R. Malac =

American diplomat

Deborah Ruth Malac
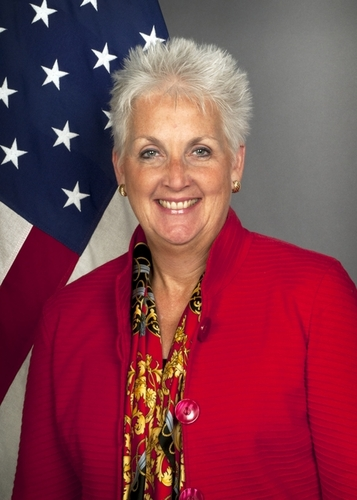
- Official portrait, 2012

United States Ambassador to Uganda
- In office February 27, 2016 – January 26, 2020
- President: Barack Obama; Donald Trump
- Preceded by: Scott DeLisi
- Succeeded by: Natalie E. Brown

United States Ambassador to Liberia
- In office July 26, 2012 – December 18, 2015
- President: Barack Obama
- Preceded by: Linda Thomas-Greenfield
- Succeeded by: Mark Boulware (acting)

Personal details
- Born: Deborah Ruth Malac; 1955 (age 70–71)
- Education: Furman University (B.A.); University of Virginia (M.A.); Dwight D. Eisenhower School for National Security and Resource Strategy (M.S.)

Deborah Ruth Malac (born 1955) is an American diplomat, who served as the United States Ambassador to Uganda. She was nominated by President Barack Obama and was confirmed by the Senate Nov. 19, 2015. She previously served as United States Ambassador to Liberia.

== Early life and education ==
Malac is the daughter of Marian Bartak Malac and Barry Forrest Malac, a Czech immigrant. In 1977 Malac earned a B.A. in international studies magna cum laude and Phi Beta Kappa from Furman University. She also received an M.A. in foreign affairs from the University of Virginia in 1981. She later studied at the Industrial College of the Armed Forces (now Dwight D. Eisenhower School for National Security and Resource Strategy) and received an M.S. in national resources strategy there in 2002. Malac spent a year studying international law at the University of Basel on a Fulbright Foundation fellowship.

== Career ==
Malac joined the Department of State in 1981. She has spent most of her career focusing on Africa. Her assignments included serving as desk officer for Laos and South Africa. Overseas assignments brought her to Bangkok, Pretoria, and Yaoundé, Cameroon, Senegal and Ethiopia.

In 2012 Malac became U.S. Ambassador to Liberia. In 2014, a major Ebola outbreak started there, and Malac helped coordinate the U.S. response to the medical and humanitarian crisis. Liberia's president, Ellen Johnson Sirleaf, joined Malac in a tour of the Liberian capital and implored U.S. President Barack Obama to assist the country. When aid was forthcoming, Malac assured Liberians that American military assistance (which became Operation United Assistance) were not there to organize a coup against Ellen Johnson-Sirleaf. Malac later noted that coordinated efforts helped to curb the epidemic.

On September 19, 2015, President Obama nominated Malac to become the U.S. Ambassador to Uganda to replace Scott DeLisi, who announced he was retiring. The Senate confirmed the nomination in November 2015. When elections took place shortly after her arrival, the government of Uganda issued statements critical of Malac for her admonition not to sacrifice democratic processes in the country for the sake of security. Her mission terminated on January 26, 2020.

== Personal life ==
In addition to English, Malac speaks French, German and Thai. Malac and her husband, Ron Olson, have three children.

Diplomatic posts
Preceded by Linda Thomas-Greenfield	United States Ambassador to Liberia; 2012–2015	Succeeded by Mark Boulware; Acting
Preceded by Scott DeLisi	United States Ambassador to Uganda; 2015–2020	Succeeded by Natalie E. Brown
