= Robert South Barrett IV =

American diplomat (1927–2004)

4th United States Ambassador to Djibouti
- In office September 5, 1988 – April 18, 1991
- Preceded by: John Pierce Ferriter
- Succeeded by: Charles R. Baquet III

Personal details
- Born: 1927
- Died: December 24, 2004 (aged 76–77) MedStar Georgetown University Hospital, Washington, D.C., U.S.
- Cause of death: Cancer
- Education: Princeton University (AB); University of Wisconsin–Madison
- Profession: Diplomat

Robert South Barrett IV (1927 – December 24, 2004) was an American Career Foreign Service Officer who served concurrent appointments as Chargé d'Affaires ad interim to Madagascar and Comoros (1977-1980) and was Ambassador Extraordinary and Plenipotentiary to Djibouti (1988-1991). He also served as “Consul in Martinique, political officer in war-torn Vietnam, ... and Deputy Chief of Mission in conflict-ravaged Beirut, with a relatively peaceful interim tour at the United Nations in New York, before accepting the post of Ambassador to Djibouti, a country of great strategic importance to the United States”

Barrett graduated with an AB was in politics from Princeton University and a master's in economics from the University of Wisconsin–Madison.

A resident of Washington, D.C. and Charleston, South Carolina, Barrett died of cancer at Georgetown University Hospital.
