= William H. Twaddell =

American diplomat

United States Ambassador to Nigeria
- In office November 10, 1997 – August 3, 2000
- President: Bill Clinton
- Preceded by: Walter Carrington
- Succeeded by: Howard Franklin Jeter

Personal details
- Born: 1941 (age 84–85) Madison, Wisconsin
- Education: Brown University

William H. Twaddell (born 1941) is a retired American diplomat and former journalist for the New York Daily News. Twaddell ended his extensive career as United States Ambassador to Nigeria, where he served from 1997 to 2000.

Prior to this, Twaddell served as Ambassador to Mauritania from 1988 to 1991, as the de facto Ambassador to Liberia from 1992 to 1995, and as Chargé d'Affaires ad interim to Mozambique from 1980 to 1983. In addition to his diplomatic career, Twaddell served as interim CEO of Dorcas International Institute.

== Early life and education ==
Twaddell was born in 1941 in Madison, Wisconsin. A resident of Providence, Rhode Island, he graduated from Providence Country Day School and Brown University in 1963 and was a member of the board of trustees. After stints in the Peace Corps and the Army, Twaddell became a D.C.-based reporter for the New York Daily News.

== Diplomatic career ==
Twaddell joined the Foreign Service in 1969, and was first assigned to Dhahran, Saudi Arabia as a Vice Consul. After returning to Washington, D.C., Twaddell became a petroleum analyst, and eventually joined the Department of State's Executive Secretariat. During the Carter Administration, Twaddell served as a special assistant to Secretary of State Cyrus Vance. Twaddell served as Chargé d'Affaires ad interim to Mozambique from 1980 to 1983. In 1988, he became Ambassador to Mauritania, serving from 1988 to 1991.

From 1992 to 1995, Twaddell served as the United States' "chief of mission" to Liberia. In this position, he was the de facto U.S. ambassador to the country, given the lack of formal relations between the United States and the Liberian national government at the time. Two months after he arrived, 500 West African peacekeepers were kidnapped by rebel forces in 1992. He worked with former President Jimmy Carter to have the hostages released. In 1997, he became United States Ambassador to Nigeria, a position he held until 2000.

== Personal life ==
Twaddell married artist Susan L. Hardy in an August 1989. In addition to English, Twaddell speaks Arabic, French, Portuguese, and Spanish.
