= Thomas P. Kelly III =

American diplomat

Tom Kelly
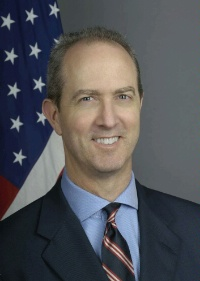

United States Ambassador to Djibouti
- In office June 26, 2014 – January 15, 2017
- Appointed by: Barack Obama
- Preceded by: Geeta Pasi
- Succeeded by: Larry André Jr.

Assistant Secretary of State for Political-Military Affairs
- Acting
- In office April 19, 2013 – April 2014
- President: Barack Obama
- Preceded by: Andrew J. Shapiro
- Succeeded by: Puneet Talwar

Personal details
- Born: 1961 (age 64–65) Manhattan Beach, California, U.S.
- Education: Georgetown University (BA, MA); Stanford University (MA)

Thomas P. Kelly III is an American diplomat who served as the U.S. Ambassador to Djibouti and Acting Assistant Secretary of State for Political-Military Affairs.

== Early life and education ==
Kelly was born in 1961, and is a native of Manhattan Beach, California. Kelly earned his bachelor's degree from the School of Foreign Service at Georgetown University in 1984. He then earned a master's degree in development economics from Stanford University and another in Latin American studies from Georgetown University.

== Career ==
Kelly began his career in the United States Foreign Service in 1985, and has served in U.S. Missions in San Salvador, Santiago, Chile, Quito, Vilnius, Buenos Aires, and São Paulo. Kelly worked in the Bureau of Economic and Business Affairs from 1988 to 1990 and in the Office of the United States Trade Representative.

Kelly was nominated to serve as U.S. Ambassador to Djibouti by President Barack Obama on April 7, 2014. He presented his credentials on October 13, 2014. Kelly's mission was terminated on January 15, 2017, and he was replaced by Larry André Jr.

After the end of the Obama administration, Kelly became the Vice President for Policy and Advocacy at Raytheon.
