= Jerrold M. North =

American diplomat

1st United States Ambassador to Djibouti
- In office October 27, 1980 – August 27, 1982
- President: Jimmy Carter; Ronald Reagan
- Preceded by: Diplomatic relations established
- Succeeded by: Alvin P. Adams Jr.

Personal details
- Born: December 8, 1931 Chicago, Illinois, U.S.
- Died: August 27, 2006 (aged 74) Harrisburg, Pennsylvania, U.S.
- Resting place: West Point Cemetery
- Spouse: Gayle Adele von Plonski (m. 1959)
- Education: University of Illinois; United States Military Academy; University of Alabama (MS)

Military service
- Allegiance: United States
- Branch/service: United States Army
- Years of service: 1954-1963

Jerrold Martin North (December 8, 1931 - August 27, 2006) was a US Army officer and a diplomat, who served as United States Ambassador to Djibouti.

== Biography ==
North briefly attended the University of Illinois before entering West Point, Class of 1954. When he graduated, North joined the Field Artillery and then spent two years with the 82nd Airborne Division. Afterwards, he served nine months at Fort Sill where he was a member of the first surface-to-surface missile course. He was assigned to the 3rd Infantry Division and the 10th Infantry Division as a battery executive officer; and received his master's degree during that time. He resigned the Army in 1963 to enter the Foreign Service.

== Foreign Service ==
North was appointed a Foreign Service officer in November 1963. During his career before becoming ambassador, he served in Somalia, Vietnam, and Belgium.

Jimmy Carter appointed North to be the first American Ambassador to Djibouti, where he served from 1980 until 1982.

== Personal life ==
North married Gayle Adele von Plonski in June 1959.
