= Alvin P. Adams Sr. =

American aviation executive

- Born: Maryland
- Education: Yale University
- Occupation: Business executive

Alvin P. Adams Sr. was an American aviation executive.

== Early life and education ==
Adams was born to a banker from Maryland and grew up in Colorado. He was educated at Yale University. During his Yale years, he was known to visit New York's "21" Club and other jazz venues. He also played the banjo and was an amateur boxing champion. Adams's New York residence was frequented by musicians such as Art Tatum and Dizzy Gillespie. Facing financial challenges during his time at Yale, he played poker with his wealthier peers to offset expenses. Outside of aviation, Adams had an interest in sports and participated in big-game hunting.

== Career ==
By the age of 21, Adams served as The Wall Street Journal's first aviation specialist. By 24, he held a vice president position at a distinguished aviation investment firm, and by 29, he assumed the role of an airline president.

In the 1930s, Adams relocated to California. There, he revitalized the struggling Western Air Express Airlines, facilitating its transformation into Western Airlines. Concurrently, he socialized with Howard Hughes and W. C. Fields. He was also a co-founder of Conquistadores del Cielo, a group of senior aviation executives known for their discreet gatherings.

In later years, he led multiple aviation companies and settled as a consultant in New York until 1951. Subsequently, his Yale acquaintance, Juan Trippe, the founder of Pan Am, appointed him as a senior vice president. While he was responsible for the airline's Pacific division, he was also instrumental in the creation of Pan Am's New York building behind Grand Central Terminal, which housed the Sky Club.

== Personal life ==
Adams, who was married and divorced twice. After his 1929 marriage to Elizabeth Miller, daughter of former New York Governor Nathan L. Miller, Adams had a presence on Long Island's North Shore.

Adams had two sons, Nathan and Alvin Jr., and two daughters, Edith Kiggen and Helen Vollmer. He died on Oct. 2 at Lenox Hill Hospital in Manhattan in 1996, at the age of 90.
