= Lange Schermerhorn =

American diplomat

Lange Schermerhorn (born September 1939) was sworn in as United States Ambassador to Djibouti on December 11, 1997. She served until November 2000. She was named to the board of WorldWater Corp., a water management and solar engineering company in 2001.

Born and raised in Florham Park, New Jersey, Schermerhorn graduated from Madison High School in 1957. She received her bachelor's degree in history and international relations from Mount Holyoke College in 1961, is a 1982 graduate of the National War College, National Defense University at Fort Lesley J. McNair, Washington, D.C.; and she obtained a certificate in Economics from the Foreign Service Institute in 1974.

== Publications ==
- Doing Social Work in Southeast Asia, The Foreign Service Journal April 2015
