= CIA activities in Somalia =

US spy agency's actions in Somalia

Since the 1960s the United States Central Intelligence Agency (CIA) has engaged in a variety of covert activities in the east African country of Somalia. These activities have included financing pro-Western Somali political parties, deploying paramilitary units in combat, funding warlords, carrying out extraordinary renditions and most recently operating black sites. Somali government officials have reported that American agents operate unilaterally inside the country.

== Democratic Era (1960 - 1969) ==
CIA agents reportedly played a significant role in manipulating the outcome of the 1967 elections. The ascension Prime Minister Muhammad Haji Ibrahim Egal was in large part financed by thousands of dollars in covert support to Egal and other pro-Western elements in the ruling Somali Youth League party by the CIA.

== Somali Civil War (1991 - Present) ==
=== UNOSOM II (1993) ===
On 12 July 1993, the U.S. State Department issued a warning that the CIA had received intelligence regarding a planned large-scale assault on UN officials in Mogadishu by Mohamed Farah Aideed’s faction, the Somali National Alliance. According to Professor Raphael Chijioke Njoku, the American contingent of UNOSOM II responded to the CIA's intelligence by launching a helicopter attack that resulted in deaths of 70 Somalis who had been discussing a peace proposal. Shortly after the raid it was disclosed that the CIA report had been incorrect.

=== Funding warlords and Ethiopian invasion ===
The CIA began a covert operation to arm and finance Somali warlords who were fighting against the Islamic Courts Union (ICU) during 2003. At the behest of the CIA, in early 2006 numerous Somali warlords had united under the banner of the Alliance for the Restoration of Peace and Counterterrorism. Operating from the intelligence agency’s station in Nairobi, Kenya, CIA agents would make frequent trips to Mogadishu by plane where they would pay hundreds of thousands of dollars to the warlords. When the payments to the warlords shifted the military balance of the country in their favor, the ICU started a strike against the American-backed coalition and drove it out of Mogadishu, becoming the first organization to consolidate control over the entire city since the collapse of the Somali state.

Using local warlord militias was seen as a way to avoid sending US troops in the wake of the October 1993 Battle of Mogadishu. State Department officers, however, disapproved of the CIA effort, with one source saying "They were fully aware that they were doing so without any strategic framework...they realized that there might be negative implications to what they are doing." In 2006, Leslie Rowe, the deputy Chief of Mission in Kenya, signed off on a cable back to State Department headquarters that detailed grave concerns throughout the region about American efforts in Somalia. Around that time, State Department political officer, Michael Zorick, who had been based in Nairobi, was reassigned to Chad after he criticized, inside the government, Washington's policy of paying Somali warlords.

During the subsequent Ethiopian invasion of Somalia, the Bush administration expressed doubts about Ethiopia's ability to effectively use the new equipment it had been provided for the operation, prompting the further involvement of CIA agents. CIA paramilitary officers participated in combat alongside the Ethiopian military from the outset of operations against the Islamic Courts Union. CIA forces also directed Ethiopian troops during the invasion.

=== Drone strikes ===
In early January 2011, it was reported that the US, probably the CIA, hit its first target in Somalia with a drone strike. Recently, reporting from OSGEOINT suggests that this drone probably originated from Camp Lemmonier, Djibouti where engineers at the base constructed a dedicated drone support apron during the 2010-2011 period. The first strike in Somalia coincided with the confirmed deployment of a predator combat air patrol and a predator primary satellite link suggesting local command and control.

=== Secret prison ===
Alongside funding proxy wars in Somalia, the CIA has also financed a secret prison in Mogadishu, run by the Somali National Intelligence and Security Agency, but entirely reliant on the United States.

Jeremy Scahill in the August 2011 edition of the Nation magazine reported on the CIA's compound at Mogadishu's Aden Adde International Airport. According to Scahill, "the facility looks like a small gated community, with more than a dozen buildings behind large protective walls and secured by guard towers at each of its four corners...At the facility, the CIA runs a counterterrorism training program for Somali intelligence agents and operatives aimed at building an indigenous strike force capable of snatch operations and targeted “combat” operations against members of Al Shabab." According to OSGEOINT, the construction of the CIA facility seems highly probable due to the other changes that have occurred around the airport since its reported construction. Open source satellite imagery shows wall-secured areas added, including a wall surrounding the entire airport as well as hardened access control points (ACPs). Between 20 July 2010 and 22 August 2011, AAIA has had much of the vegetation cleared off from the perimeter, guard towers added every quarter mile on the Northeast boundary (--more frequent on the Northwest), a towed artillery element deployed, as well as additional structures erected throughout the secured sections of the airfield. It also appears that an unknown donor (probably the US) is in the process of adding a parallel taxi-way to the main aircraft apron further enhancing the capacity of the airfield.

== See also ==
- Somali Civil War (Ethiopian intervention * 2009–present phase)
- Drone strikes in Somalia
