= John W. Limbert =

American diplomat (born 1943)

John Limbert
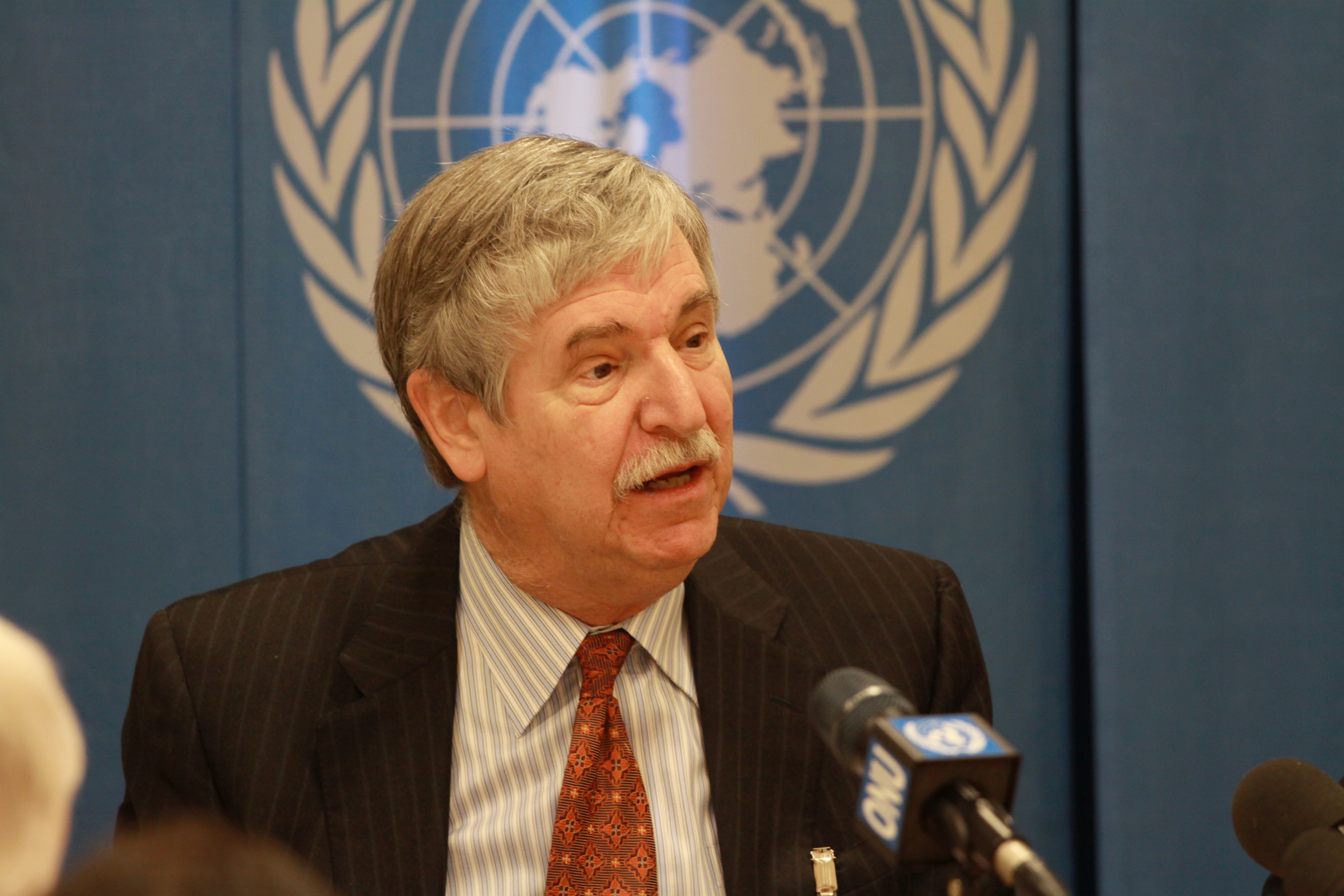
- Limbert in a press conference in 2010

United States Ambassador to Mauritania
- In office November 21, 2000 – August 8, 2003
- Appointed by: Bill Clinton
- Preceded by: Timberlake Foster
- Succeeded by: Joseph LeBaron

Personal details
- Born: John W. Limbert; 1943 (age 82–83) Washington, D.C.
- Spouse: Parvaneh TabibZadeh
- Children: Mandana and Shervin
- Education: Harvard University
- Occupation: Diplomat

John W. Limbert (born 1943) is an American diplomat. He is the former Deputy Assistant Secretary of State for Iran in the US State Department's Bureau of Near Eastern Affairs. He is a veteran U.S. diplomat and a former official at the U.S. Embassy in Tehran, where he was held captive during the Iran hostage crisis.

== Biography ==
Limbert was born in Washington, D.C., where he graduated from public school. He received his B.A., M.A., and Ph.D. all from Harvard University. His Ph.D. was in History and Middle Eastern Studies.

In 1962, Limbert first traveled to Iran while his parents were working there for USAID. Before joining the U.S. Foreign Service, Limbert returned to Iran as a Peace Corps volunteer (1964–66) and as an English instructor at Pahlavi University (1969–72, later renamed Shiraz University). He speaks Persian fluently.

Limbert's wife, Parvaneh, is a naturalized American citizen of Iranian descent, and since 1980 she has been a resident of Stockbridge, Vermont. They have a daughter, Mandana, who is an associate professor of anthropology at the City University of New York, and a son named Shervin. Mrs. Limbert is a painter and has had her work featured in art galleries.

== Diplomatic and academic career ==
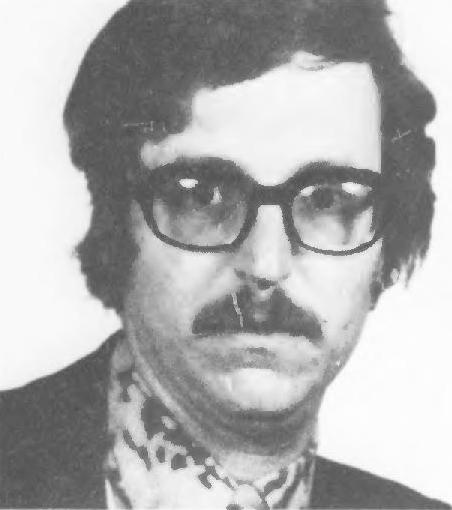
Limbert pictured before his captivity in Iran

Ambassador Limbert joined the Foreign Service in 1973. His overseas postings included Algeria, Djibouti, Iran, Saudi Arabia, and the United Arab Emirates. From 2000–2003, he was Ambassador to the Islamic Republic of Mauritania. While still Ambassador, he was one of the first civilian officials to enter Baghdad in April 2003 with the Organization of Reconstruction and Humanitarian Assistance. Among his earlier positions, he served as Deputy Coordinator for Counterterrorism in the State Department (2000). Limbert retired from the Foreign Service with the rank of Minister-Counselor.

In academic field, Limbert's positions have included: professor of political science at the U.S. Naval Academy (1981–84), Senior Fellow at Harvard University's Center for International Affairs (1991–92), Dean of the Foreign Service Institute's School of Language Studies, and an appointment as the Distinguished Professor of International Affairs in the departments of political science and history at the U.S. Naval Academy in August 2006.

In November 2009, Limbert was appointed the first-ever U.S. Deputy Assistant Secretary of State for Iran. In accepting the appointment, Limbert took a sabbatical from the U.S. Naval Academy. After just nine months on the job, Limbert resigned from his position in July 2010 to return to his teaching position at the U.S. Naval Academy. In making his decision, Limbert cited frustration with the lack of diplomatic progress made with Iran: "The Obama administration has been in office now for over a year and a half, and I think everyone thought we would be in a better place with Iran. Not necessarily that we would be friends, but that we would at least be talking to each other on a regular and civil basis."

=== Iran ===
In 1979, Limbert was a newly appointed Foreign Service officer posted to the U.S. Embassy in Tehran when it was overrun by Iranian students. He had arrived as a diplomat only 12 weeks before the embassy's capture. Along with 52 other Americans, he would be held captive for more than a year. Asked about how his experience as a hostage in Iran changed him, Limbert said, "I think I got a new appreciation for our own profession – that is, the profession of diplomacy. And the idea of how do you solve problems between nations and between people?"

Limbert also remarked that he was wrong about the 1979 Islamic Revolution: "I admit that I called it wrong really from the beginning and in the direction that it went. The direction that it went – this rather harsh and brutal and intolerant direction that it went – certainly surprised me. I didn't expect it. Nor did I expect that we and the Iranians would remain estranged for as long as we have."

== Books ==
- The Origins and Appearance of the Kurds in Pre-Islamic Iran, Iranian Studies, Vol. 1, No. 2, Spring 1968.
- Iran: At War with History (Westview Press, 1987). ISBN 978-0865314481
- Shiraz in the Age of Hafez: The Glory of a Medieval Persian City. Seattle, Wash.: University of Washington Press. 2004. ISBN 0-295-98391-4.
- Negotiating with Iran: Wrestling the Ghosts of History. United States Institute of Peace Press. 2009. ISBN 978-1601270436.
- ”Believers: Love and Death in Tehran” Spring 2020.
- A Modern Theocracy: Iran's Anti-Enlightenment Revolution Endures. Co-authored with Mansour Farhang. Mazda Publishers. 2025. ISBN 978-1-56859-415-6

== See also ==
- List of kidnappings
- US-Iran relations
