= Michael Dodman =

American diplomat (born 1961)

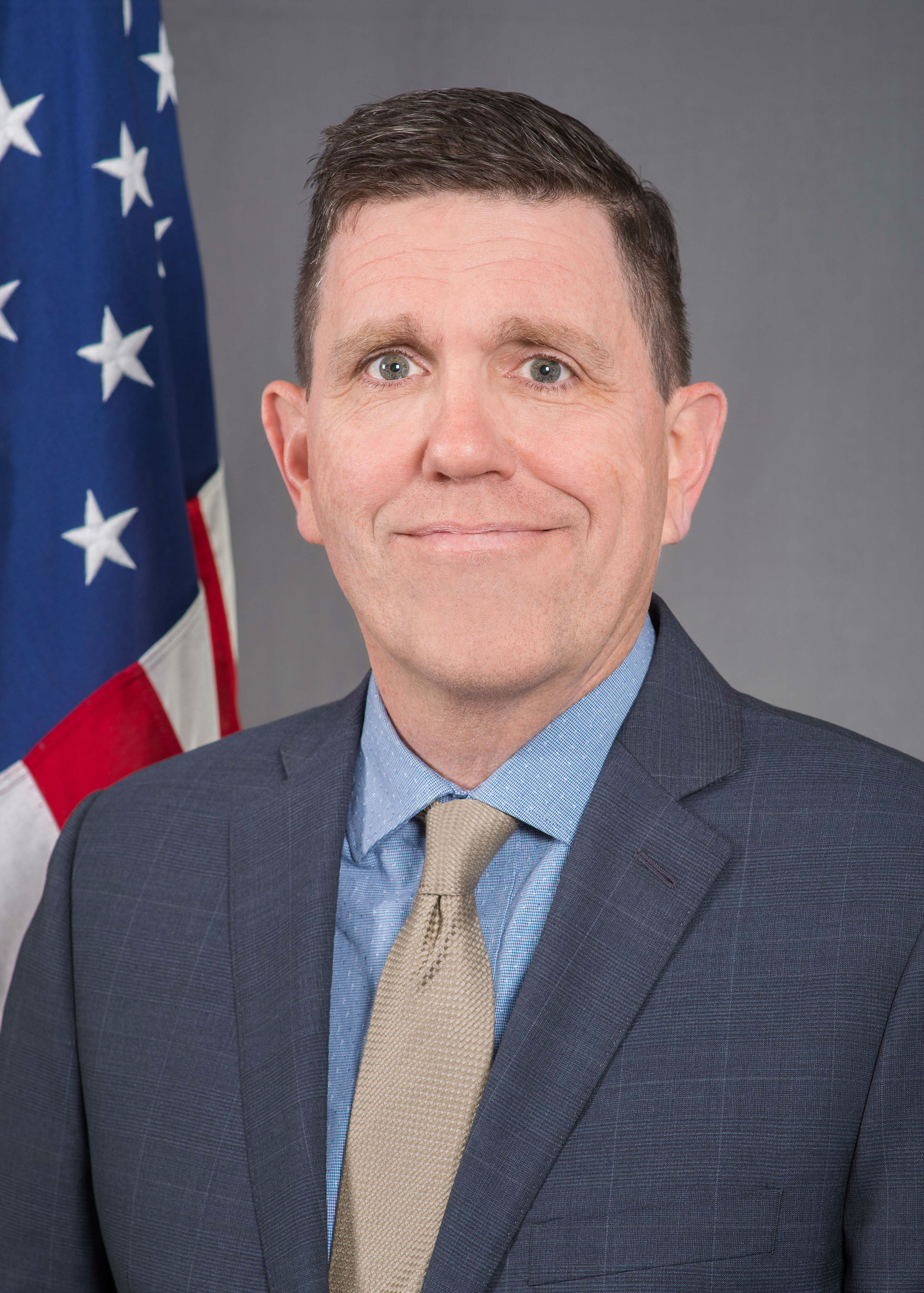

United States Ambassador to Mauritania
- In office March 13, 2018 – February 2021
- President: Donald Trump; Joe Biden
- Preceded by: Larry André Jr.
- Succeeded by: Cynthia Kierscht

Personal details
- Born: 1961 (age 64–65) Buffalo, New York
- Spouse: Joan
- Children: 4
- Education: Georgetown University; Boston University; Princeton University

Michael James Dodman (born 1961) is an American diplomat and career member of the Senior Foreign Service who served as the United States Ambassador to Mauritania from 2018 to 2021. Prior to assuming that role, he served as an Executive Assistant in the Office of the Under Secretary for Economic Growth, Energy and the Environment at the United States Department of State. A career diplomat since 1987, Dodman's previous assignments have included Principal Officer at the U.S. Consulate General in Karachi, Pakistan; Economic Counselor at the U.S. Mission to the European Union; and Economic Counselor at the U.S. Embassy in Baghdad, Iraq.

Dodman graduated from Georgetown University's School of Foreign Service (BS in Foreign Service with an emphasis on International Economics, 1983) and earned an M.A. in Development Economics and International Development at Boston University in 1986 and a Master's in Public Administration at Princeton University in 1999.

He was Chargé d'Affaires Czech Republic between March 29-August 18, 2022.

Diplomatic posts
Preceded by Larry André Jr.	United States Ambassador to Mauritania; 2018–2021	Succeeded by Cynthia Kierscht
