= Richard H. Riley IV =

American diplomat

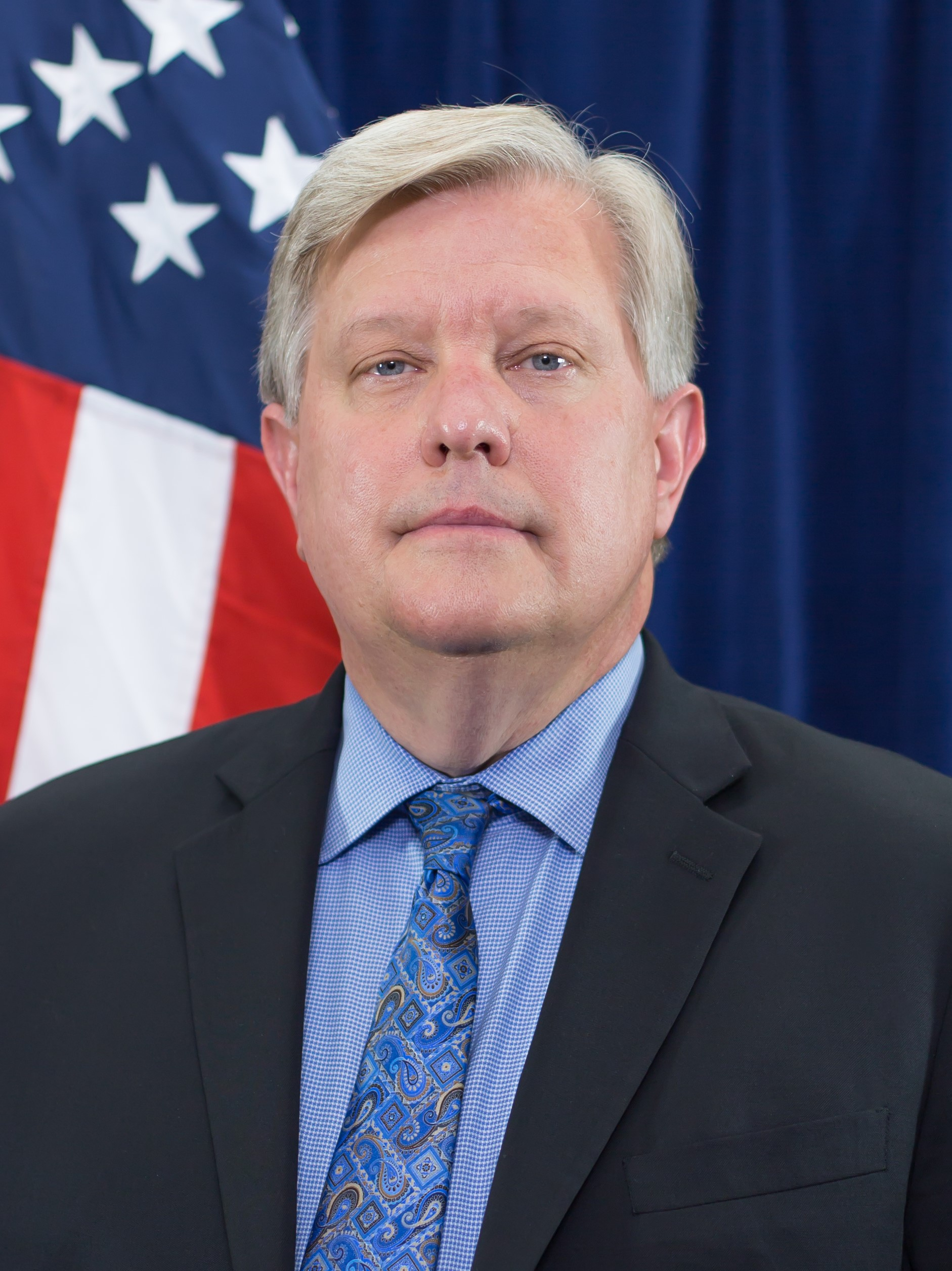
- Official portrait, 2021

United States Ambassador to Somalia
- In office June 21, 2024 – January 15, 2026
- President: Joe Biden
- Preceded by: Larry Andre Jr.

Personal details
- Education: University of Georgia (BBA); Harvard University (MBA); National War College (MS)

Richard H. Riley IV is an American diplomat who had served United States ambassador to Somalia.

== Early life and education ==
Riley earned a Bachelor of Business Administration from the University of Georgia at Athens, a Master of Business Administration at Harvard Business School, and a Master of Science (Distinguished Graduate) at the National War College.

== Career ==
Riley is a career member of the Senior Foreign Service, class of Minister-Counselor. He previously served as minister counselor for Economic Affairs at the United States Embassy in Ottawa, Canada and also as consul general at the U.S. consulate general in Peshawar, Pakistan. He has also served as the Charge d'affaires and deputy chief of mission at the U.S. embassy in Oslo, Norway, assistant chief of mission at the U.S. embassy in Kabul, Afghanistan, and deputy chief of mission at the U.S. embassy in Sanaa, Yemen. Riley also performed leadership roles during multiple tours in both Iraq and Afghanistan, serving as Senior Civilian Representative (SCR) for the Provincial Reconstruction Team (PRT) in Nangarhar province, Afghanistan and two tours of duty in Iraq, both in Nassiriyah (Dhi Qar) province and at the U.S. embassy in Baghdad. His other leadership roles in the U.S. Foreign Service have included, deputy director of the Office of Egypt and Levant Affairs at the United States Department of State, as well as assignments in London, England, Moscow, Russia, Beijing and Chengdu, China, as well as Kingston, Jamaica. Riley also has extensive private sector experience, having worked as a Strategy Consultant for both Boston Consulting Group (BCG) and PriceWaterhouseCoopers, LLC in Hong Kong and San Francisco, California, following earning his MBA at Harvard in 1997.

=== United States ambassador to Somalia ===
On March 27, 2023, President Joe Biden nominated Riley to be the next ambassador to Somalia. His nomination was confirmed by the United States Senate via voice vote on May 2, 2023. He was sworn into office on May 8, 2024. He arrived in Mogadishu on June 17, 2024. He presented his credentials to President Hassan Sheik Mohamud on June 21, 2024.

== Personal life ==
Riley speaks Mandarin Chinese, French, Russian, Arabic, and Pashto.
