= Mark Boulware =

American diplomat (born 1948)

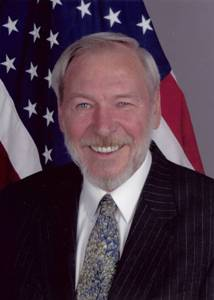

United States Ambassador to Liberia Acting
- In office December 19, 2015 – April 18, 2016
- President: Barack Obama
- Preceded by: Deborah Malac
- Succeeded by: Christine Elder

United States Ambassador to Chad
- In office November 10, 2010 – July 25, 2013
- President: Barack Obama
- Preceded by: Louis Nigro
- Succeeded by: James Knight

United States Ambassador to Mauritania
- In office November 22, 2007 – May 6, 2010
- President: George W. Bush; Barack Obama
- Preceded by: Joseph LeBaron
- Succeeded by: Jo Powell

Personal details
- Born: 1948 (age 77–78) Oklahoma City, Oklahoma, U.S.
- Education: Midwestern State University; United States Army War College

Mark Boulware (born 1948) is an American diplomat who served as the United States Ambassador to Chad from 2010 to 2013. He also served as the United States Ambassador to the Islamic Republic of Mauritania from 2007 until 2010.

Mr. Boulware was born in Oklahoma City, Oklahoma in 1948. He studied at the University of Rennes 2 – Upper Brittany in Rennes, France and at Midwestern State University in Wichita Falls, Texas, where he earned a BA (1971) and MA (1974). He graduated from the U.S. Army War College in Carlisle, Pennsylvania, in 1994. He is a recipient of the Department of State's Superior Honor Award, Senior Performance Pay Award and three Meritorious Honor Awards, as well as NASA's "Silver Snoopy" award. He was awarded the Pedro Ernesto Medal of Merit by the city of Rio and the Tamandaré Medal of Merit by the Brazilian Navy.

Mark Boulware was nominated as U.S. Ambassador to the Islamic Republic of Mauritania on July 26, 2007 and confirmed by the Senate on October 26, 2007. He presented his credentials to President Abdallahi on November 22, 2007. He became the United States Ambassador to Chad on September 8, 2010. A career member of the Senior Foreign Service, class of Minister-Counselor, he most recently served as Faculty Advisor at the National War College. He was previously assigned as Diplomat in Residence at Florida International University, in Miami, Florida.

Earlier overseas postings were as U.S. Consul General in Rio de Janeiro, Brazil from 2001 to July 2004, Deputy Chief of Mission at the American Embassy in San Salvador (1999–2001), Deputy Chief of Mission in Yaoundé, Cameroon (concurrently accredited to Equatorial Guinea) from 1996 to 1999; as Administrative Counselor in Bamako, Mali (1994–1996) and Gaborone, Botswana (1990–1993); as Administrative Officer in Banjul, The Gambia (1987–1989); as Supervisory General Services Officer in Ouagadougou, Burkina Faso (1985–1987); as Consular Officer in Maracaibo, Venezuela (1982–1985); and as General Services Officer in Jakarta, Indonesia (1980–1982).

Domestically, he was detailed to the U.S. House of Representatives as a Pearson Fellow (1989–1990), working for Congressman Dante Fascell. Before joining the Foreign Service in 1980, Mr. Boulware was a commissioned officer in the United States Army. He served tours of duty in Pirmasens, Germany and Hawthorne, Nevada, leaving active service as a captain.

He is an honorary citizen of Rio de Janeiro and an honorary chief of the Nso people of Cameroon. He is proficient in Portuguese, Spanish, French and Indonesian.

== Sources ==
This article incorporates work from https://web.archive.org/web/20100527092947/http://mauritania.usembassy.gov/ambassador.html and https://web.archive.org/web/20100528140429/http://www.state.gov/r/pa/ei/biog/104222.htm, which are in the public domain as they are works of the United States Government.

Diplomatic posts
Preceded by Joseph LeBaron	United States Ambassador to Mauritania; 2007–2010	Succeeded by Jo Powell
Preceded by Louis Nigro	United States Ambassador to Chad; 2010–2013	Succeeded by James Knight
Preceded by Deborah Malac	United States Ambassador to Liberia; Acting; 2015–2016	Succeeded by Christine Elder
