= John Pierce Ferriter =

American diplomat

John Pierce Ferriter (born January 26, 1938, in Boston, Massachusetts), a career Foreign Service Officer, Class of Minister-Counselor, who served as the U.S. Ambassador to Djibouti from 1985 until 1987.

In 1962 and 1963, Ferriter was a law librarian with Mendes & Mount in New York. In 1964 he joined the U.S. Foreign Service and was posted to the U.S. Embassy in Brazzaville, Congo, until 1965. From 1966 to 1970, he was an economic officer at the U.S. Mission to the Organization for Economic Cooperation and Development in Paris, France. In 1972, Ferriter became a staff member of the National Security Council at the White House. From 1983 until his nomination in Djibouti, he was the deputy chief of mission at the U.S. Embassy in Kinshasa, Zaire.

Ferriter served as Deputy Executive Director of the International Energy Agency in Paris in the 1990s after his retirement from the Foreign Service.

Ferriter graduated from Queens College, City University of New York (B.A., 1960), Fordham University School of Law (L.L.B., 1963), Harvard University’s John F. Kennedy School of Government (M.P.A., 1973) and the U.S. Army War College in 1983. He served in the United States Marine Corps Reserve from 1955 to 1961.
