= Larry André Jr. =

American diplomat (born 1961)

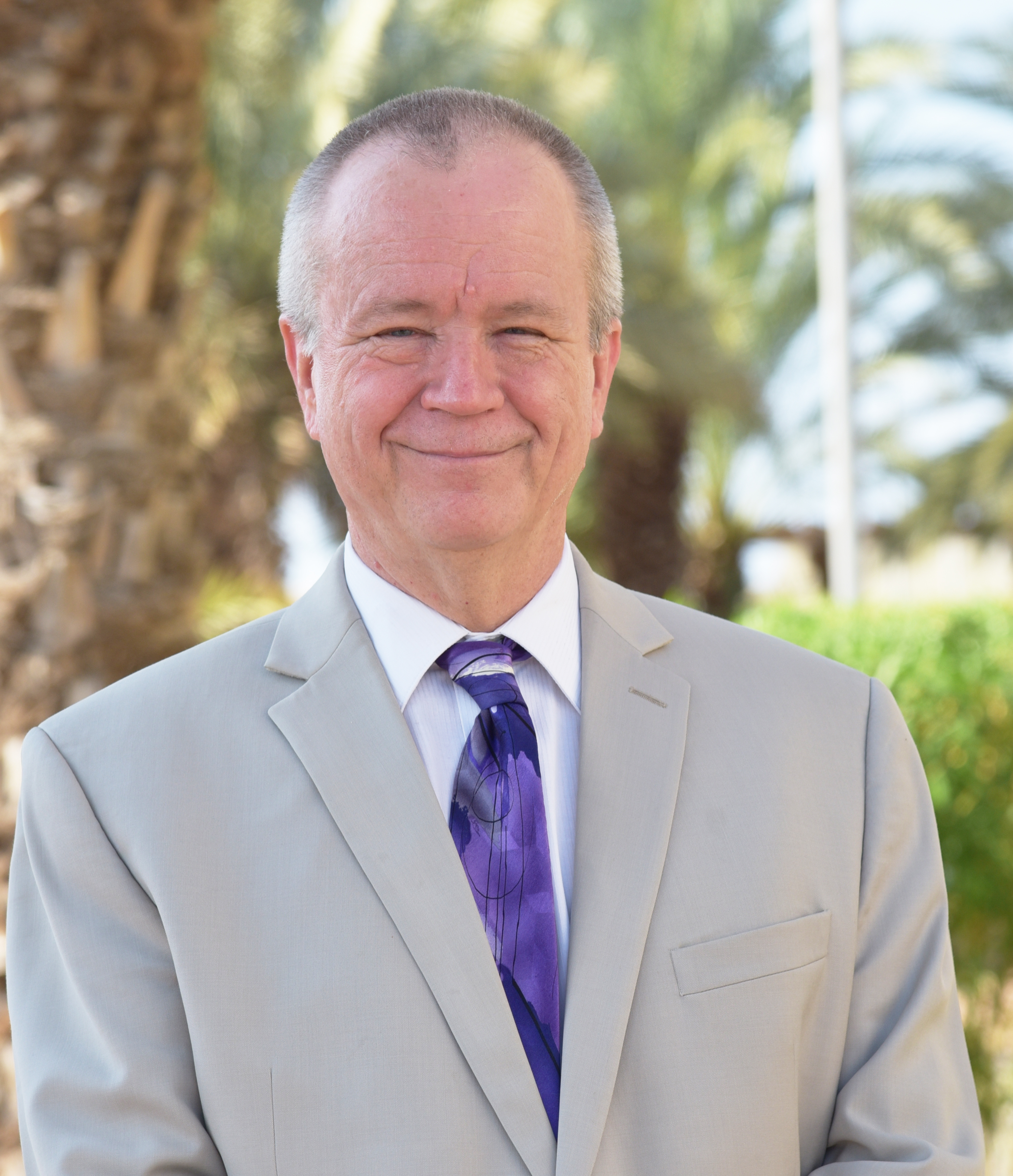

United States Ambassador to Somalia
- In office February 7, 2022 – May 30, 2023
- President: Joe Biden
- Preceded by: Donald Y. Yamamoto
- Succeeded by: Richard H. Riley IV

United States Ambassador to Djibouti
- In office February 19, 2018 – January 20, 2021
- President: Donald Trump
- Preceded by: Thomas P. Kelly III
- Succeeded by: Jonathan Pratt

United States Ambassador to Mauritania
- In office November 3, 2014 – November 17, 2017
- President: Barack Obama; Donald Trump
- Preceded by: Jo Ellen Powell
- Succeeded by: Michael Dodman

Personal details
- Born: Larry Edward André Jr. 1961 (age 64–65)
- Education: Thunderbird School of Global Management (MBA); Claremont McKenna College (BA)

Larry Edward André Jr. (born 1961) is a retired American diplomat and career member of the Senior Foreign Service who had served as the United States ambassador to Somalia from February 2022 to May 2023. He previously served as the United States ambassador to Djibouti from 2018 to 2021, and as the United States ambassador to Mauritania from 2014 to 2017.

== Early life and education ==
André earned a Master of Business Administration from Thunderbird School of Global Management of Arizona State University and a Bachelor of Arts from Claremont McKenna College.

== Career ==
André is a career member of the Senior Foreign Service, with the rank of Minister-Counselor. He served as the United States Chargé d’Affaires ad interim at U.S. Embassy in Juba, South Sudan. He is a former ambassador to Djibouti and Mauritania. He has served as Director of the Office of the Special Envoy for Sudan and South Sudan, and as Deputy Executive Director in the State Department’s Bureau of African Affairs, and was the Deputy Chief of Mission at the U.S. Embassy in Dar es Salaam, Tanzania.

André has served as a diplomat since 1990. He is a two-time Deputy Chief of Mission with appointments to nine American missions abroad, mostly in Africa. He has also held senior policy positions at the United States Department of State.

=== U.S. ambassador to Somalia ===
On April 15, 2021, President Joe Biden nominated André to be the next United States ambassador to Somalia. The Senate Foreign Relations Committee held hearings on his nomination on June 9, 2021. The committee reported him favorably to the Senate floor on June 24, 2021. On December 18, 2021, the United States Senate confirmed his nomination by voice vote. On January 29, 2022, he presented a copy of his credentials to Minister of Foreign Affairs Abdisaid Muse Ali. On February 7, 2022, he presented his credentials to then President Mohamed Abdullahi Mohamed.

== Awards and recognitions ==
He is the recipient of numerous State Department Awards, including the Director General Award for Reporting, and was recently recognized by the Chairman of the Joint Chiefs of Staff with the Joint Distinguished Civilian Award.

== Personal life ==
Andre speaks French.

Diplomatic posts
Preceded by Jo Ellen Powell	United States Ambassador to Mauritania; 2014–2017	Succeeded by Michael Dodman
Preceded by Thomas P. Kelly III	United States Ambassador to Djibouti; 2018–2021	Succeeded by Andrea J. Tomaszewicz; Chargée d’Affaires
Preceded by Donald Y. Yamamoto	United States Ambassador to Somalia; 2022–2023	Succeeded by Richard H. Riley IV
