= Martin L. Cheshes =

American diplomat

Martin L. Cheshes (born 1939) is a retired diplomat who was the American ambassador to Djibouti from 1993 to 1996.

Djibouti is of great strategic importance. Among other things, it was “the staging area for Washington's campaign against Al Qaeda and other terrorist groups in the region. But Djibouti is also a telling example of a problem that has bedeviled the Bush administration's war on terror: the struggle to harmonize its own military goals with the needs of the countries in which it is operating. Put simply, the administration seems to be better at taking the fight to its enemies than helping its friends.” Despite its importance in advancing American interests, Cheshes and other officials have not gotten the money needed to meet those goals. He tried to take advantage of visiting American forces to paint schools or give vaccinations. After he left, the 24th Marine Expeditionary Unit built furniture for schools after they completed a military exercise.

He and his wife Marlyn live in Nederland, Colorado where Marlyn works as an artist. Martin was elected mayor in 2008 but lost his bid for re-election in 2010.
