= Marguerita Dianne Ragsdale =

American diplomat

Marguerita Dianne Ragsdale (born 1948) is a Career Foreign Service Officer who served as the American Ambassador to Djibouti from February 1, 2004 until July 6, 2006.

== Biography ==
Born in Richmond, Virginia but raised on a farm in Dinwiddie County, Virginia, (McKenney, Virginia) Ragsdale has a B.A. degree from American University in Washington, D.C., M.A. and Ph.D. degrees from the University of Virginia, and a J.D. degree from Columbia University.

== Career ==
Considered a Middle East specialist, Ragsdale’s first assignment was as the Junior Consular and General Services Officer at the American Embassy in Kuwait in 1984. Two years later, she served as Political Officer at the U.S. Embassy in Mogadishu, Somalia.

Djibouti has strategic and political importance for the United States because of its location on the Horn of Africa overlooking the Gulf of Aden. Camp Lemonnier, the only U.S. military base on the African continent, is there. While Ambassador, the US donated several refurbished Coast Guard vessels as part of an effort to bolster Djibouti’s navy. Work began on the Defense Fuel Supply Point (DFSP) at the Port of Doraleh while Ragsdale was Ambassador. She oversaw $27 million in direct aid for educational and healthcare assistance.
