= Cynthia Kierscht =

American diplomat

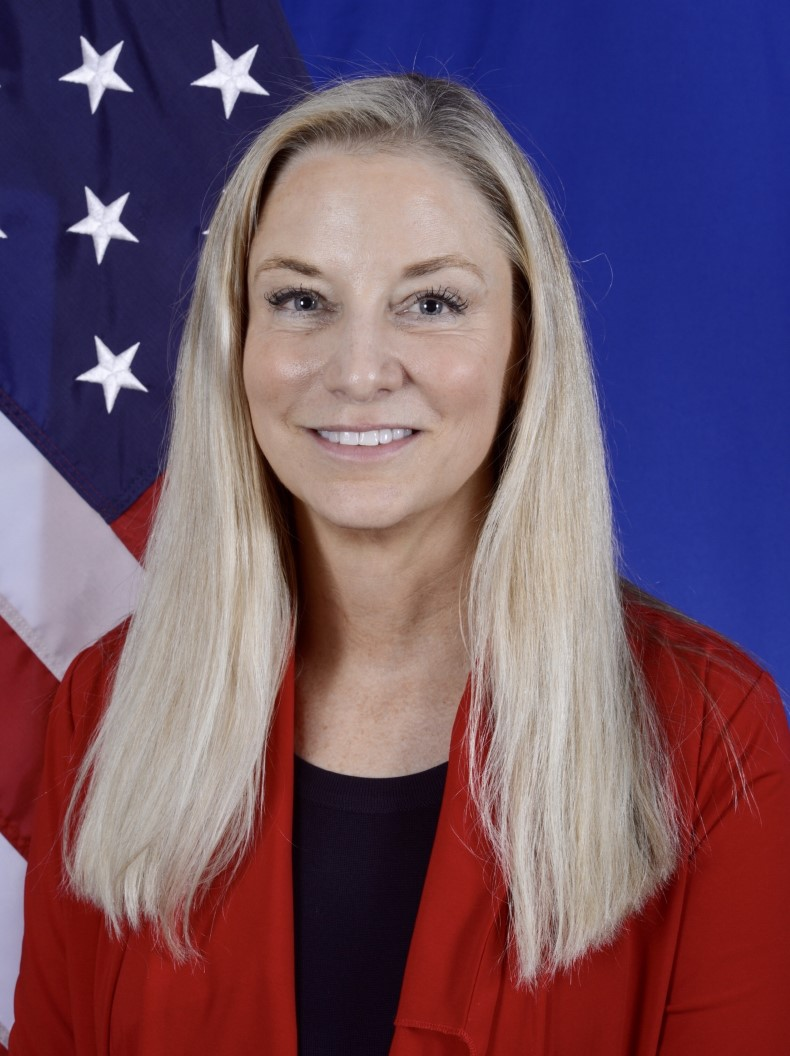
- Official portrait, 2021

United States Ambassador to Djibouti
- Incumbent
- Assumed office October 17, 2024
- President: Joe Biden; Donald Trump
- Preceded by: Jonathan Pratt

United States Ambassador to Mauritania
- In office June 22, 2021 – July 9, 2024
- Nominated by: Donald Trump
- Appointed by: Joe Biden
- Preceded by: Michael Dodman
- Succeeded by: John T. Ice (Chargé d’Affaires)

Personal details
- Education: Carleton College (BA); Harvard Kennedy School (MPP)

Cynthia Kierscht is an official at the United States Department of State serving as the United States ambassador to Djibouti since 2024. She previously served as the United States ambassador to Mauritania from 2021 to 2024.

== Education ==
Kierscht is a 1983 graduate of Fargo North High School. She earned her Bachelor of Arts from Carleton College and her Master of Public Policy from the Harvard Kennedy School.

== Career ==
Kierscht is a career member of the Senior Foreign Service, class of minister counselor. She served as the director and deputy director of the Office of Canadian Affairs for the State Department. She served as the deputy assistant secretary for Canada, Haiti and the Caribbean in the Bureau of Western Hemisphere Affairs. She has served in different capacities at United States Embassies; From 2013 to 2016, while in Bogotá, Colombia she served as the Cultural Affairs Officer and as the Deputy Management Counselor from 2011 to 2013. Other assignments include Rabat, Morocco, and Cairo, Egypt, as well as serving in the United States Consulate in Marseille, France, and at the United States Interests Section in Tripoli, Libya. Among her other assignments at the State Department, Kierscht worked in the Executive Secretariat and the Operations Center, in the Bureau of Near Eastern Affairs, and in the Bureau of Counterterrorism and Countering Violent Extremism.

=== U.S. ambassador to Mauritania ===
On June 15, 2020, President Donald Trump nominated Kierscht to serve as the United States ambassador to Mauritania. On June 18, 2020, her nomination was sent to the Senate. Hearings on her nomination were held before the Senate Foreign Relations Committee on December 2, 2020. She was discharged from the committee on December 22, 2020, and was confirmed via voice vote by the entire Senate that same day. She was sworn in on January 27, 2021. She presented her credentials to President Mohamed Ould Ghazouani on June 22, 2021.

=== U.S. ambassador to Djibouti ===
On January 23, 2023, President Joe Biden nominated Kierscht to serve as the United States ambassador to Djibouti. Hearings on her nomination were held before the Senate Foreign Relations Committee on June 13, 2023. Her nomination was favorably reported by the committee on July 13, 2023. On May 2, 2024, her nomination was confirmed in the Senate by voice vote. She was sworn into office on July 18, 2024 by Under Secretary of State for Civilian Security, Democracy, and Human Rights Uzra Zeya. She presented her credentials to President Ismael Omar Guelleh on October 17, 2024.

=== U.S. ambassador to Senegal ===
On November 9, 2026, President Donald Trump nominated Kierscht to be the United States ambassador to Senegal and Guinea-Bissau.

== Personal life ==
Kierscht speaks Arabic, French, and Spanish.

== See also ==
- Ambassadors of the United States

Diplomatic posts
Preceded by Michael Dodman	United States Ambassador to Mauritania; 2021–2024	Succeeded by John T. Ice; Chargé d’Affaires
Preceded by Christopher Snipes; Chargé d’Affaires	United States Ambassador to Djibouti; 2024–present	Incumbent
