= Jo Ellen Powell =

American diplomat

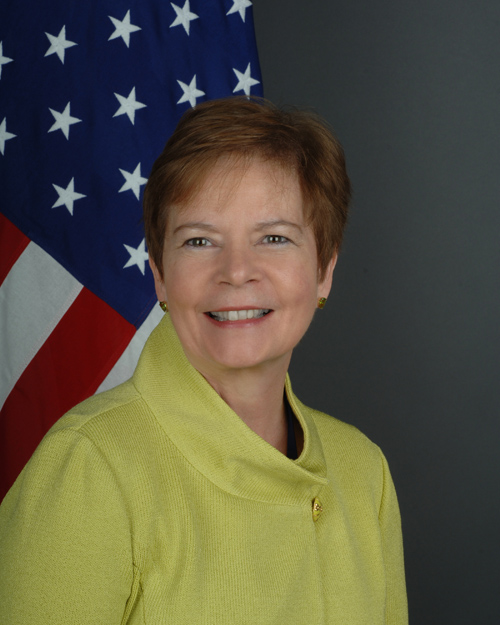
Jo Ellen Powell. Official U.S. State Department photo

Jo Ellen Powell (born 1953) is a career member of the United States Foreign Service who served as Consul General in Frankfurt, Germany and was nominated as the US ambassador to Mauritania by Barack Obama on July 15, 2010. She has been known in Frankfurt for her active engagement with Germany's Muslim community, as well as with students, through the "Windows on America" program. Prior to that Powell was the executive director of the Bureau of Western Hemisphere Affairs, director of the Office of Employee Relations, and management counselor at the U.S. Embassy in Canberra, Australia. Powell has also served in France, Italy, Lebanon, and Jordan. She is married to Stephen Engelken, also a career diplomat and current deputy chief of mission to Islamabad in Pakistan, with whom she has a son.

== Early life and education ==
Powell is the daughter of John Millard Powell, a career Department of State employee who served as a diplomatic courier and administrative officer. She spent time in Panama, Saudi Arabia, Lebanon, Sri Lanka, India, Iran, and Laos during her youth. She earned a B.A. from Centre College before joining the Department of State.

== Nomination as Mauritanian Ambassador ==
Powell was nominated to succeed Mark Boulware as US ambassador to the Islamic Republic of Mauritania on July 15, 2010, by President of the United States Barack Obama, on the same day that Kristie Kenney was nominated as ambassador to the kingdom of Thailand. Neither has yet been confirmed by the United States Senate in their nominations, about which President Obama has stated "I am proud to nominate these accomplished individuals to represent our nation abroad. I am grateful they have agreed to serve in these important roles, and I look forward to working with them to strengthen our global partnerships." Nouakchott will be Powell's first post as Ambassador, and she will be one of the first women to serve as US Ambassador to Mauritania.

Diplomatic posts
Preceded by Mark Boulware	United States Ambassador to Mauritania; 2010–present	Succeeded by Incumbent
