= Embassy of the United States, Mogadishu =

U.S. diplomatic mission in Mogadishu, Somalia

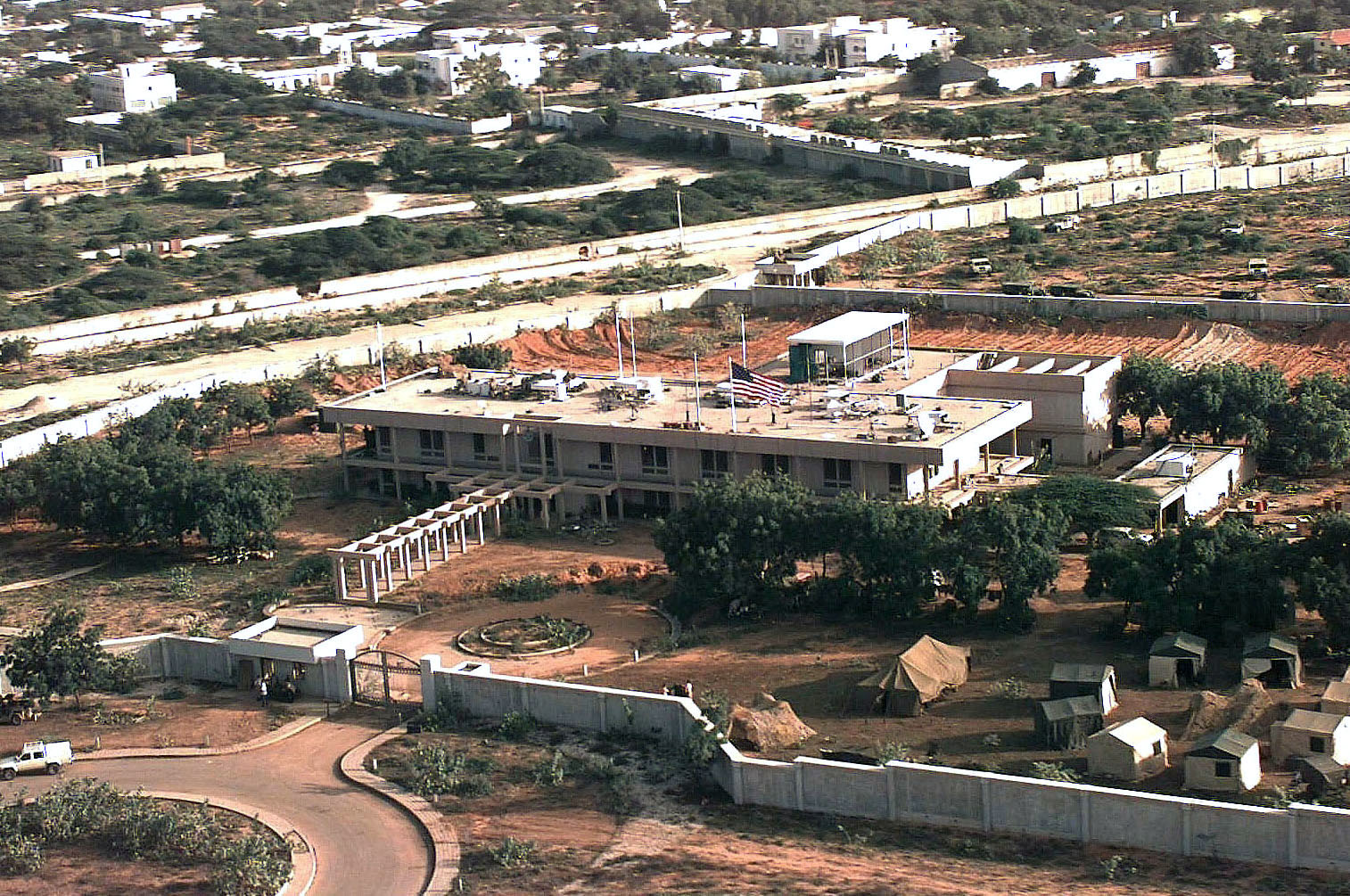
- The former embassy compound in 1992, shortly after it was assigned as the headquarters for US personnel within UNITAF.
- Location: Mogadishu, Somalia; 1989 embassy: 2°2′9.6″N 45°17′41.2″E; Old embassy (1957–1989): 2°2′9.4″N 45°20′40.5″E
- Opened: July 1, 1960 (upgraded from consulate-general, which had opened July 1, 1957)
- Closed: January 5, 1991–December 5, 2018
- Jurisdiction: Somalia
- Website: Official website

The Embassy of the United States of America to Somalia is a diplomatic mission of the United States in Mogadishu, Somalia, from 1960 to 1991. In 1957, the US opened a consulate-general in Mogadishu—the capital of the Trust Territory of Somalia, a UN trusteeship under Italian administration. The consulate was upgraded to embassy status in July 1960, when the US recognized Somalia's independence and appointed an ambassador. The embassy served to counter Soviet influence during the Cold War and also served as a base for the United States Agency for International Development, which had a large presence in the country. In 1989, the embassy moved from a dilapidated building in central Mogadishu to a new compound on the outskirts of the city.

Violence quickly enveloped the city in late December 1990, during the Somali Civil War, and on 1 January 1991, the ambassador contacted the State Department to request the closure and evacuation of the embassy. Approval was given the following day, but violence and the collapse of the central government prevented the US, and several other countries, from airlifting their diplomats and civilians through Mogadishu International Airport. USS Guam and USS Trenton, which were stationed off the coast of Oman, were dispatched to airlift staff from the embassy; American civilians and many foreign diplomats also gathered at the embassy, seeking evacuation. The embassy closed on January 5, 1991, and 281 American and foreign diplomats and civilians were airlifted by helicopter from the embassy compound to Guam and Trenton.

In December 1992, the embassy compound was reoccupied and repaired to serve as a headquarters for US personnel within the Unified Task Force and, following the transition to UN control, a base for UNOSOM. The US worked with various parties in Somalia to establish peace and formally recognized the newly established Federal Government of Somalia in January 2013. In May 2015, US Secretary of State John Kerry visited Somalia and stated that the US planned to reopen its embassy soon; the Somali government presented him with the real estate deed for land reserved for the new US embassy compound in Mogadishu. The move came three months after President Obama nominated Katherine Dhanani to the post of US ambassador to Somalia, who would have been the first US ambassador to Somalia since 1991, but she withdrew three months later.

In December 2018, the United States established a permanent diplomatic mission in Mogadishu. On October 2, 2019, the United States announced the reestablishment of the United States Embassy in Mogadishu.

== History ==
The State Department sent two consuls to Mogadishu in 1956 to establish a diplomatic post and on July 1, 1957, the United States Consulate-General in Mogadishu opened. The consulate was an offshoot of the US embassy to Italy. At the time, Mogadishu was the capital of the Trust Territory of Somalia, a United Nations Trust Territory under Italian administration that was scheduled to become independent in 1960. In addition to establishing a presence, the consulate staff were also charged with political research and developing relations with future Somali leaders.

On July 1, 1960, the Trust Territory of Somalia (the former Italian Somaliland) became independent and united, as planned, with the briefly extant State of Somaliland (the former British Somaliland) to form the Somali Republic (Somalia). The United States recognized and established diplomatic relations with the Somali Republic the same day. The consulate-general was elevated to embassy status and its chargé d'affaires, Andrew G. Lynch, was appointed ambassador on July 5. He presented his credentials on 11 July, at which point he officially became the first US ambassador to Somalia.

Like most US diplomatic posts in Africa during the Cold War, a primary purpose of the embassy was to counter Soviet influence in the region and contain the spread of communism. For a time after the Sino-Soviet split, China was also actively competing for influence in the developing world, including activities in Somalia and the many other parts of the world. Beginning in the 1960s, the US engaged in development projects in Somalia to counter the influence of communism. Staff from the United States Agency for International Development (USAID), which carried out most of these projects, comprised a substantial number of the embassy's staff during the next three decades. Educational programs were also given emphasis by the embassy in the years after independence, and there was a sizable Peace Corps presence.

The US became the protecting power for the United Kingdom in Somalia after Somalia severed diplomatic relations with the United Kingdom in 1963, due to a dispute over the administration of the ethnic-Somali Northern Frontier District. Besides providing consular assistance for Britons, the embassy was also tasked with the protection of the British embassy compound and its properties. The US opened a consulate in Hargeisa the following year to assist Peace Corps activities and represent British interests in the northwestern region of Somalia, which had been under British administration from 1884 to 1960. In 1967, the embassy went into a lock down during the Six-Day War between Israel and neighboring Arab countries, which Somalia supported. The US was viewed as Israel's protector by Somalis and the embassy was subjected to some minor demonstrations of protesting.

During the 1969 coup d'état which brought Siad Barre to power, the embassy was blockaded by soldiers, who prevented the movement of persons into or out of the compound for over 24 hours. Only the ambassador managed to briefly visit the embassy en route to the Foreign Ministry, where he made a formal complaint against the embassy's blockade. In the wake of the coup, the Somali government became patrons of the Soviet Union and China. Three days after the coup, the Peace Corps was ordered to leave within three days. This soon extended to one week, and many of the volunteers were housed in the homes of embassy staff before being evacuated by a US Air Force plane. The Foreign Assistance Act prohibited foreign assistance to nations whose ships engaged in trade with Vietnam. After Somali-flagged vessels were observed at port in Hanoi, US development assistance to Somalia was terminated. The Barre government responded by expelling the US military attaché, prohibiting local residents from visiting the embassy, and restricting travel by embassy staff to within 25 miles (40 km) of Mogadishu. (Note: The exact distance has been claimed to be 25 mi (40 km) or 40 mi (64 km)) The consulate in Hargeisa was closed and the USAID program, which had more staff than the rest of the embassy, ended. However, in the late 1970s, the Soviets became patrons of Ethiopia and in the wake of the Ogaden War between Somalia and Ethiopia, Somalia turned to the West for support. The US sought access to airports and ports in Somalia in exchange for military equipment and economic aid.

In July 1989, the embassy moved to a new, 80-acre (32 ha) compound on the outskirts of Mogadishu—the largest US embassy in Sub-Saharan Africa. The site had been acquired by the US in the mid-1960s and later turned into a golf course that was frequented by embassy staff.

=== Prelude to closure ===
In the late 1980s, there was increasing rebellion against the rule of President Siad Barre and by 1990, the country began to descend into civil war. Criminal violence was also increasing all over Somalia.

In 1990, seasoned diplomat James K. Bishop was appointed US Ambassador to Somalia. In 1967, Bishop was at the US Embassy in Beirut, Lebanon when the Six-Day War erupted, which prompted the evacuation of about 3,600 Americans in 33 hours; Bishop was one of 26 diplomats and Marines that remained in the city during the conflict. Ambassador Bishop also gained valuable experience organizing evacuations of several embassies in the 1980s while serving as Deputy Assistant Secretary of State for Africa. In his previous post, as US ambassador to Liberia, Bishop was overseeing the voluntary evacuation of embassy staff and civilians as a civil war in Liberia spread, when he left in March 1990. Ambassador Bishop returned to Washington to prepare for his new appointment to Somalia, but he was soon appointed to a taskforce to deal with the crisis in Liberia, which included a gradual evacuation of American civilians and a rapid closure of the embassy in August.

Aware of the violence going on in the Somali countryside, Ambassador Bishop felt "the odds were better than even that we would have to leave Mogadishu under less than favorable circumstances." On August 1, Ambassador Bishop visited United States Central Command—the military command for the Middle East and Northeast Africa (Note: Today, Somalia is part of the US military's Africa Command area of responsibility.)—where he worked with military experts to review the embassy's Emergencies and Evacuation (E&E) plan until he was "satisfied...that [Central Command] realized that it might have to conduct an evacuation from Mogadishu and was prepared to do that." A few hours after his visit, Iraq invaded Kuwait. The US was mobilizing assets for a response when Ambassador Bishop arrived in Mogadishu on September 6. The primary interest of the Ambassador was to maintain the US military's permission and access to airfields and ports in Mogadishu and Berbera, which the US had negotiated in 1979. This was especially important given the mobilization for intervention in Kuwait, Somalia's strategic location near the Arabian Peninsula and the mouth of the Red Sea, and because Saudi Arabia would not allow US troops on their soil. The embassy was also home to a large number of USAID staff, although the spread of unrest into the countryside was making their work increasingly difficult.

The Somali Civil War spread through the country during 1990 and late in the year there was an increasing level of criminal violence in Mogadishu. By December, the security situation began to deteriorate significantly and on December 5, Ambassador Bishop told an audience at a standing-room only meeting that he was recommending the voluntary evacuation of all dependents (i.e. children and spouses of diplomatic staff) and non-essential personnel. By December 19, the number of official US personnel in the city was reduced from 147 to 37 and of the 90 private Americans in the city, half were estimated to have left. Small-arms fire became a daily occurrence and stray bullets and shells were landing in the embassy complex.

On December 30, violence escalated significantly as rebel groups entered the city, although the ambassador claimed the nature and extent of the violence was not immediately clear. On December 30–31, diplomats, including many stationed in offices elsewhere in the city, were collected and housed in the ambassador's residence, the marine house, and the K-7 compound located across Afgoy Road. On the morning of December 31, the defense attaché was nearly killed when his vehicle was sprayed with bullets and that evening, a soldier at a roadblock shot the tires of a vehicle carrying another defense official. Attempts by the US and other nations' diplomats, in particular the Italian embassy, to negotiate a ceasefire for foreigners to leave were unsuccessful. Afgoy Road became a "shooting gallery," preventing those in safe-havens outside the embassy to reach it. On New Year's Day, the first American civilians began to seek refuge at the embassy.

=== Closure and evacuation ===
Ambassador Bishop requested an evacuation of the American community on January 1, 1991, indicating that the evacuation could be with the planned Italian, French, or German evacuation efforts, but that he preferred a U.S. Department of Defense evacuation. The State Department authorized the evacuation on 2 January and Ambassador Bishop specifically requested a US military evacuation, thus beginning Operation Eastern Exit. Ambassador Bishop had spent a considerable amount of time discussing contingency plans for evacuation with other diplomatic posts. Ultimately, ten heads of missions—eight ambassadors and two chargés d'affaires—along with their staff sought refuge in the US embassy compound and were evacuated.

Initial plans called for the United States Air Force to dispatch two transport aircraft to Mogadishu International Airport, but diplomats were unable to contact anyone in the Somali government to obtain clearance for the aircraft to land at the airport and it also became clear that it was too dangerous to travel from the embassy to the airport. Meanwhile, USS Guam and USS Trenton began transit from the coast of Oman towards Mogadishu with forces from the 4th Marine Expeditionary Brigade.

On January 4, several incidents, including several exchanges of gunfire, suggested that the embassy's security detail was insufficient to hold off armed Somalis until USS Guam and USS Trenton arrived with their helicopters and soldiers, at that time scheduled to arrive on January 7. The embassy had just six Marine guards, whose job was limited to protecting the chancery. Ambassador Bishop made an urgent request to Washington for two platoons of soldiers to parachute into the embassy to defend it until the ships arrived. The request was denied, but the Ambassador was told that an advance element of Marines from the vessels would reach the embassy the following morning.

Two helicopters carrying a 60-man security detail—51 Marines and 9 US Navy SEALs—reached the embassy compound on the morning of January 5 and left with 61 evacuees. Throughout the day US and foreign nationals seeking evacuation arrived at the embassy compound, including the Soviet ambassador and 38 of his staff from the Soviet Union's embassy. Meanwhile, the embassy compound was prepared for the main evacuation, which occurred in the early morning hours of January 6. The first of four waves of helicopters—three for civilians and the fourth for the security detail and ambassador—left the ships at midnight (UTC+4). The final wave reached the ships at 03:43. A total of 281 evacuees were taken from the embassy, including eight ambassadors (and two other heads of missions) and 61 Americans.

Armed looters were observed entering the embassy compound as the final wave departed. The doors of the chancery—the main building of the embassy—were reportedly blown open by rocket-propelled grenades within two hours of the embassy's evacuation. Somali employees of the embassy—known as foreign service nationals (FSNs)—could not be evacuated. Local banks had been closed for some time and the embassy was unable to pay the FSNs. The Ambassador left the FSNs with keys to the commissary and warehouse on the embassy compound and they were permitted to take anything they needed.

The United States reopened its embassy in Mogadishu nearly three decades after Somalia collapsed into civil war, on October 2, 2019. Ambassador Donald Yamamoto said that the reopening reflected progress in the Horn of Africa country in recent years and the partnership between the two countries.

== Embassy compound ==
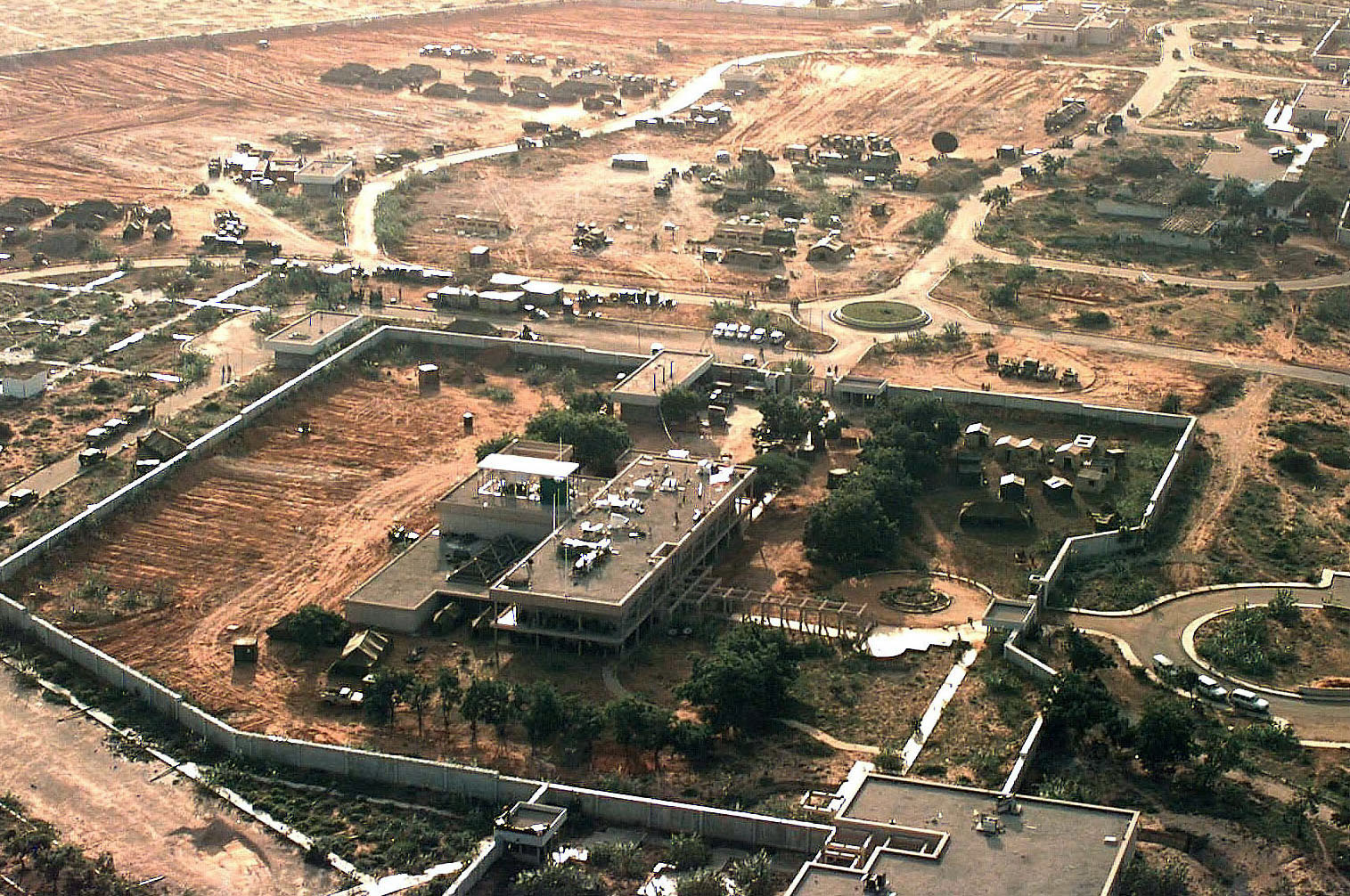
Left side of the embassy compound in December 1992. The chancery, with its own wall, is in the foreground with the USIS building (bottom right). The JAO building is barely visible in the upper right, with the Marine House to its left (top, right of center). The golf course was beyond the wall in the upper left. When this photo was taken, the embassy compound was being cleared to serve as UNITAF headquarters.

The first US consuls in Mogadishu set up their initial office in a small room in the city's Public Works Department building. Shortly thereafter, an Italian contractor built the first US chancery in downtown Mogadishu. According to John Blane, the vice consul in Mogadishu from 1956 to 1957, the first chancery was "a rather miserable effort." He "felt that if it stood up for five years, we would be extremely lucky," but the building remained the US chancery for three decades. By the time it closed, the old chancery was one of the most dilapidated buildings the State Department had, according to Ambassador Bishop.

In July 1989, the embassy was relocated to a new, 80-acre (32 ha) compound along Afgoy Road in the local K-7 district. The grounds consisted of the Chancery, the Joint Administrative Office (JAO), Marine House (for the Marine Security Guards), the ambassador's residence, a building for the United States Information Service, an American school, a recreational complex for the local expatriate community, a 102-foot (31 m) water tower, and various storage and maintenance buildings. The recreational complex, which comprised about half of the compound, included a pool, tennis courts, and a golf course. Outside the walled embassy, the US maintained the K-7 complex, an apartment complex for embassy staff located across Afgoy Road, as well as the Office for Military Cooperation. Both were situated one and a half blocks from the embassy proper. The ambassador's residence was largely constructed in glass, had no protective barriers, and its top story overlooked the embassy's walls. Ambassador Bishop therefore ordered that some bars be installed across the glass as an additional security protective measure.

=== After closure ===
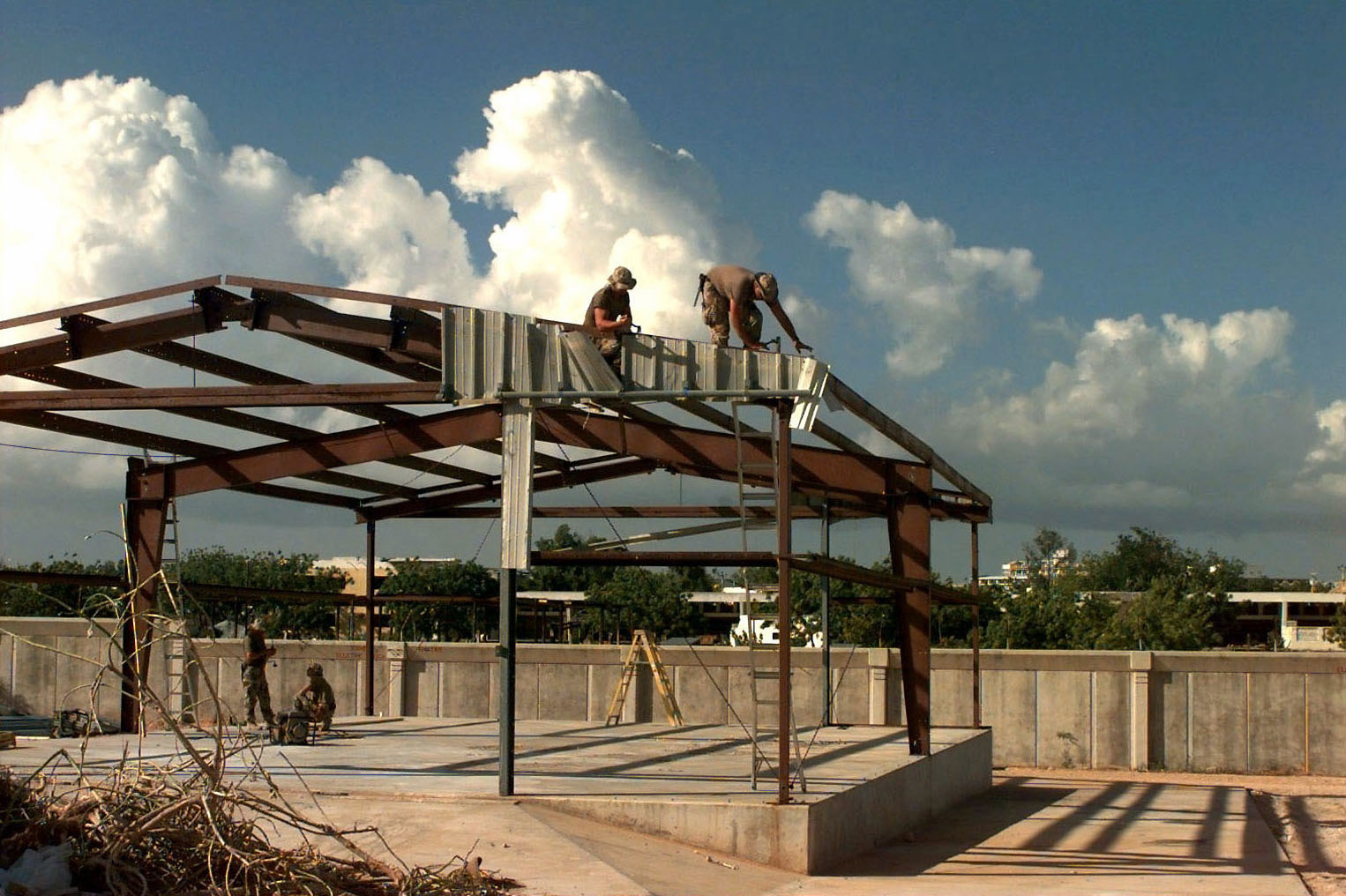
US Navy Seabees within the Unified Task Force constructing a kitchen and dining facility at the US Embassy compound in Mogadishu in 1993

After the failure of UNOSOM in 1991–2, the US led a multinational mission—UNITAF—which included military forces to ensure aid was distributed to Somalis. The US military entered Mogadishu on December 9, 1992, and moved to quickly secure the abandoned embassy, along with the airport and port. The following day, key military staff moved into the embassy to establish headquarters for the UNITAF mission, with the main headquarters located within the chancery. The embassy complex itself was in disrepair; buildings had been stripped bare, a foot (0.3 m) of debris and trash covered the floors of the chancery, and bodies were found in some areas on the premises. Personnel promptly set out cleaning the compound's living spaces and work areas to make room for the arrival and assembly area. Old warehouses were razed, and new barracks, heads and galleys were erected in their place. US Navy support elements that arrived later also imported extra materials.

US President George H. W. Bush visited the headquarters at the former embassy during his three-day visit to Somalia from December 31 to January 2. A Somali-language radio station—Radio Rajo—broadcast from the former embassy compound. On May 4, 1993, the mission transitioned from US to UN control and the name changed from UNITAF (Operation Restore Hope) to UNOSOM II. Accordingly, the embassy premises were occupied by UN personnel to serve as headquarters for UNOSOM II. The US military withdrew from the mission in March 1994 and all UN and US personnel were withdrawn in March 1995. The embassy compound remained abandoned from 1995 to 2011, where it was bulldozed and homes were erected in its place. It is now a densely populated neighborhood in Mogadishu.

== United States' diplomatic mission to Somalia ==
The US never officially severed diplomatic relations with Somalia. The US embassy in Nairobi, Kenya served as a base for the US diplomatic mission to Somalia.

The US worked with various parties throughout Somalia to establish peace and a centralized government. On 17 January 2013, the US formally recognized the Federal Government of Somalia, which was established in August 2012. In June 2014, the State Department announced that the United States would reopen its diplomatic mission, without specifying a timeline but only that it would be "soon". In February 2015, U.S. President Barack Obama nominated Foreign Service veteran Katherine Dhanani to become the new Ambassador of the United States to Somalia, but her nomination was withdrawn the following May.

US Secretary of State John Kerry visited Mogadishu in May 2015 and announced that the US planned to reopen an embassy in Mogadishu. He indicated that, although there was no set timetable for the premises' relaunch, the US government has begun upgrading its diplomatic representation in the country. President of Somalia Hassan Sheikh Mohamud and Prime Minister Omar Abdirashid Ali Sharmarke presented to Kerry the real estate deed for land reserved for the new US embassy compound.

In December 2018, the United States reopened a "permanent diplomatic presence" in Mogadishu. Some diplomatic staff were expected to remain at the US Embassy in Nairobi, Kenya where the U.S. Mission to Somalia is based. In December 2021, Larry Andre Jr. was confirmed as the new ambassador, replacing Donald Yamamoto who had served in the position from 2018 to 2022. He took over the post in January 2022, a month before the tense Somalia's federal elections. Ambassador Andre retired from the Senior Foreign Service in May 2023, departing before his term ended. The National Union of Somali Journalists praised Andre for his support of Somali journalists and free media during his time as ambassador, criticizing press repression and frequently granting press interviews. In May 2024, Ambassador Richard Riley replaced Andre.

== See also ==
- Foreign relations of Somalia
- Foreign relations of the United States
- List of diplomatic missions in Somalia
- List of diplomatic missions of the United States
