= List of ambassadors of the United States to Somalia =

Ambassador of the United States to Somalia
- السفارة الأمريكية في الصومال; Danjiraha Maraykanka u fadhiya Soomaaliya
- Seal of the United States Department of State

- Flag of the United States ambassador

- Incumbent; Ruth Anne Stevens-Klitz; Chargé d'affaires since September 10, 2026
- Style: His or Her Excellency (formal); Mr. or Madam Ambassador (informal)
- Reports to: United States Secretary of State
- Appointer: President of the United States; with the advice and consent of the Senate
- Term length: At the pleasure of the president
- Inaugural holder: Andrew G. Lynch as Ambassador Extraordinary and Plenipotentiary
- Formation: July 5, 1960
- Website: U.S. Embassy in Somalia

The United States ambassador to Somalia is the most senior diplomatic representative of the United States federal government assigned to Somalia. From 2015 to 2018 the U.S. maintained a non-resident diplomatic mission in Nairobi for Somalia and its constituent autonomous regions. In January 2013, a senior American government official indicated that the United States could eventually reopen its embassy in Mogadishu, which had closed in the early 1990s. In June 2014, the U.S. State Department also announced that it would soon name a new ambassador to Somalia. In February 2015, the U.S. government nominated its first official ambassador since 1991. In December 2018, the mission returned to Mogadishu.

== Overview ==
Diplomatic relations between the United States and Somalia started in 1960, when the Somali Republic gained independence. The U.S. immediately recognized the Somali government and moved to establish diplomatic relations. The American embassy in Somalia's capital Mogadishu was established on July 1, 1960, with Andrew G. Lynch as Chargé d'Affaires ad interim. He was promoted to Ambassador Extraordinary and Plenipotentiary four days later on July 5, 1960.

After the collapse of the Siad Barre regime and the start of the civil war in the early 1990s, the U.S. embassy closed down. However, the American government never formally severed diplomatic ties with Somalia. The United States maintained a regular dialogue with the reconstituted Somali central government through a special envoy based in the Kenyan capital, Nairobi, before reopening its Mission to Somalia in 2013.

In January 2013, the U.S. announced that it was set to exchange diplomatic notes with the new Federal Government of Somalia, re-establishing official ties with the country for the first time in 20 years. According to the Department of State, the decision was made in recognition of the significant progress that the Somali authorities had achieved on both the political and war fronts. A senior American government official also indicated after the announcement that the United States could eventually reopen its embassy in Mogadishu.

Since the reopening of the U.S. Mission to Somalia in fall of 2013, the United States has continued to be represented in Somalia by a special envoy based in Nairobi and titled a Special Representative. On August 26, 2013, the US appointed James P. McAnulty as its Special Representative to Somalia.

In 2014, U.S. President Barack Obama nominated Katherine Dhanani to become the first U.S. Ambassador to Somalia since the U.S. closed its embassy there in 1991, but she later withdrew from the nomination process for personal reasons.

In June 2016, Stephen Schwartz was sworn in as the first U.S. ambassador to Somalia in a quarter century. Schwartz's appointment came a year after U.S. Secretary of State John Kerry made an unannounced visit to Mogadishu. Schwartz resigned on September 29, 2017.

President Donald Trump nominated Donald Yamamoto as the United States Ambassador to Somalia. Mr. Yamamoto was appointed on October 19, 2018.

On April 15, 2021, President Joe Biden nominated Larry André Jr. to be the next United States Ambassador to Somalia. On December 18, 2021, the United States Senate confirmed his nomination by voice vote and he presented his credentials on February 7, 2022.

== Ambassadors ==
Name	Title	Appointed	Presented credentials	Terminated mission	Notes
Andrew G. Lynch – Career FSO	Ambassador Extraordinary and Plenipotentiary	July 5, 1960	July 11, 1960	May 7, 1962	
Horace G. Torbert, Jr. – Career FSO	Ambassador Extraordinary and Plenipotentiary	February 17, 1962	January 31, 1963	August 29, 1965	
Raymond L. Thurston – Career FSO	Ambassador Extraordinary and Plenipotentiary	September 1, 1965	November 23, 1965	December 15, 1968	
Fred L. Hadsel – Career FSO	Ambassador Extraordinary and Plenipotentiary	May 13, 1969	June 28, 1969	July 18, 1971	
Matthew J. Looram, Jr. – Career FSO	Ambassador Extraordinary and Plenipotentiary	February 15, 1972	March 13, 1972	July 5, 1973	
Roger Kirk – Career FSO	Ambassador Extraordinary and Plenipotentiary	September 20, 1973	October 8, 1973	February 20, 1975	
John L. Loughran – Career FSO	Ambassador Extraordinary and Plenipotentiary	May 8, 1975	August 13, 1975	November 5, 1978	
Donald K. Petterson – Career FSO	Ambassador Extraordinary and Plenipotentiary	October 12, 1978	December 8, 1978	December 30, 1982	
Robert B. Oakley – Career FSO	Ambassador Extraordinary and Plenipotentiary	September 30, 1982	January 26, 1983	August 12, 1984	
Peter S. Bridges – Career FSO	Ambassador Extraordinary and Plenipotentiary	November 14, 1984	December 19, 1984	May 14, 1986	
John L. Hirsch	Chargé d'affaires ad interim	May 14, 1986	N/A	August 1986	
David P. Rawson	Chargé d'affaires ad interim	August 1986	N/A	June 3, 1987	
T. Frank Crigler – Career FSO	Ambassador Extraordinary and Plenipotentiary	April 24, 1987	June 3, 1987	April 1, 1990	
James Keough Bishop – Career FSO	Ambassador Extraordinary and Plenipotentiary	June 27, 1990	September 19, 1990	January 5, 1991	Post vacant 1991–2016
Stephen M. Schwartz – Career FSO	Ambassador Extraordinary and Plenipotentiary	May 20, 2016	August 9, 2016	October 6, 2017	
Donald Y. Yamamoto – Career FSO	Ambassador Extraordinary and Plenipotentiary	October 19, 2018	November 17, 2018	July 2021	
Larry André Jr. – Career FSO	Ambassador Extraordinary and Plenipotentiary	December 18, 2021	February 7, 2022	May 30, 2023	
Timothy Trenkle	Chargé d'affaires ad interim	May 30, 2023		July 24, 2023	
Shane Dixon	Chargé d'affaires ad interim	July 24, 2023		June 17, 2024	
Richard H. Riley IV	Ambassador Extraordinary and Plenipotentiary	May 2, 2024	June 21, 2024	January 15, 2026	
Justin Davis	Chargé d'affaires ad interim	January 15, 2026		September 10, 2026	
Ruth Anne Stevens-Klitz	Chargé d'affaires ad interim	September 10, 2026		Present	

== See also ==
- Somalia – United States relations
- Foreign relations of Somalia
- Ambassadors of the United States
- Embassy of the United States, Mogadishu
