= Operation Eastern Exit =

1991 US embassy evacuation in Somalia

- Part of Somali Civil War
- Type: Noncombatant Evacuation Operation
- Location: Mogadishu, Somalia; 2°2′9″N 45°17′41″E
- Objective: Evacuate US embassy in Mogadishu, Somalia
- Date: 2–11 January 1991 (UTC+3 (Note: Except where otherwise specified, Mogadishu's time zone—UTC+3 ("Charlie" time in the military)—is used for this article, including events on board the USS Guam and USS Trenton which were operating on "Delta" time—UTC+4—which is also the time zone for Oman (where they were stationed). The military and State Department use UTC (zulu; written as Z, e.g. 01:00Z) as a worldwide standard time.))
- Executed by: United States Marine Corps; United States Navy
- Outcome: Successful evacuation of 281 diplomats and civilians from 30 countries
- Casualties: 0
- Location within Somalia

Operation Eastern Exit was the codename given to the military evacuation of the United States embassy in Mogadishu, the capital of Somalia, in January 1991. In late December 1990, violence quickly enveloped the city as armed militants began clashing with government soldiers. On 1 January 1991, the US Ambassador to Somalia, James Keough Bishop, contacted the Department of State requesting an evacuation of the embassy, which was approved the following day. United States Central Command began planning and mobilizing forces that evening. The initial plan was to evacuate with a military transport plane through the Mogadishu International Airport, but this was later abandoned. A helicopter evacuation via the USS Guam and USS Trenton was the remaining option.

On the morning of 5 January, a 60-person Marine and Navy SEAL security detail was dispatched from Guam aboard two CH-53E Super Stallion helicopters to secure the embassy and prepare for the main evacuation. The two helicopters returned to Guam with the first 61 evacuees. Throughout the day, foreign diplomats and civilians sought refuge at the embassy. Four waves of five CH-46 Sea Knight helicopters each evacuated the embassy compound shortly after midnight on 6 January. The evacuees were transported to Muscat, Oman, where they disembarked on 11 January. In total, Operation Eastern Exit evacuated 281 (with a 282nd born aboard ship) diplomats and civilians from 30 countries, including 12 heads of missions (eight ambassadors and four chargés d'affaires).

== Background ==
In the late 1980s, there was increasing rebellion against the rule of Somali President Siad Barre, a military dictator who maintained tight control of power and had a record of human rights abuses. By 1990, what began as civil disobedience evolved into a civil war, with several militias organized to overthrow the central government.

In July 1989, the embassy moved to a new, 80-acre (32 ha) compound, 6 miles (9.7 km) from the previous embassy and James K. Bishop was appointed as the United States' ambassador to Somalia. Ambassador Bishop had significant experience in crisis management at US embassies. In 1967, he was at the US Embassy in Beirut, Lebanon when the Six-Day War erupted. About 3,600 Americans were evacuated in 33 hours; Bishop was one of 26 diplomats and soldiers that remained in the city. As deputy assistant secretary of state for Africa from 1981 to 1987, Bishop chaired several task forces for crises and gained experience in the State Department's operations center as evacuations were carried out during several coups d'etat. During his previous assignment as Ambassador to Liberia (1987–90), Bishop was overseeing the voluntary evacuation of embassy staff and civilians as a civil war in Liberia spread, when he left in March 1990. Soon after returning to Washington to prepare for his new appointment to Somalia, he was appointed to a taskforce to deal with the crisis in Liberia, which included a gradual evacuation of American civilians and a rapid closure of the embassy in August.

On 1 August, before leaving the US to take up his post in Mogadishu, Ambassador Bishop visited United States Central Command—the military command for the Middle East and northeast Africa (Note: Today, Somalia is part of the US military's United States Africa Command (established in 2008) area of responsibility.)—where he spent most of the day with its commander, Gen. Norman Schwarzkopf. Ambassador Bishop, aware of the ongoing strife, believed "the odds were better than even that we would have to leave Mogadishu under less than favorable circumstances." Ambassador Bishop understood from his past experiences in Beirut and Liberia the importance of being prepared to deal with emergencies and spent the afternoon working with military experts to review the embassy's Emergencies and Evacuation (E&E) plan until he was "satisfied...that [Central Command] realized that it might have to conduct an evacuation from Mogadishu and was prepared to do that." In its analysis of Operation Eastern Exit, the Center for Naval Analyses cited the Ambassador Bishop's previous experience and "clear understanding of his role" in the operation as one of the reasons Operation Eastern Exit went so well.

Hours after Ambassador Bishop's visit to Central Command, Iraq invaded Kuwait. In 1979, the US negotiated access to an airport and port in both Mogadishu and Berbera; because of limited access the US had to locations in the Persian Gulf area, maintaining this access was a main interest for the Mogadishu embassy to pursue as the US mobilized to intervene in Kuwait. Though, the United States did not have any forces nor did it use Somali facilities in support of Operation Desert Shield.

An increasing level of criminal violence prompted Ambassador Bishop to request the voluntary evacuation of dependents (e.g. children and spouses of staff) and non-essential staff in early December, although fighting between the government and the United Somali Congress (a rebel militia) remained no less than about 160 kilometres (100 mi) away. The voluntary evacuation later became a mandatory evacuation. By 19 December, the number of official US personnel in the city was reduced from 147 to 37; around the same time, fighting between the government and rebels came within about 64 kilometres (40 mi) of Mogadishu.

=== Collapse of the Barre government ===
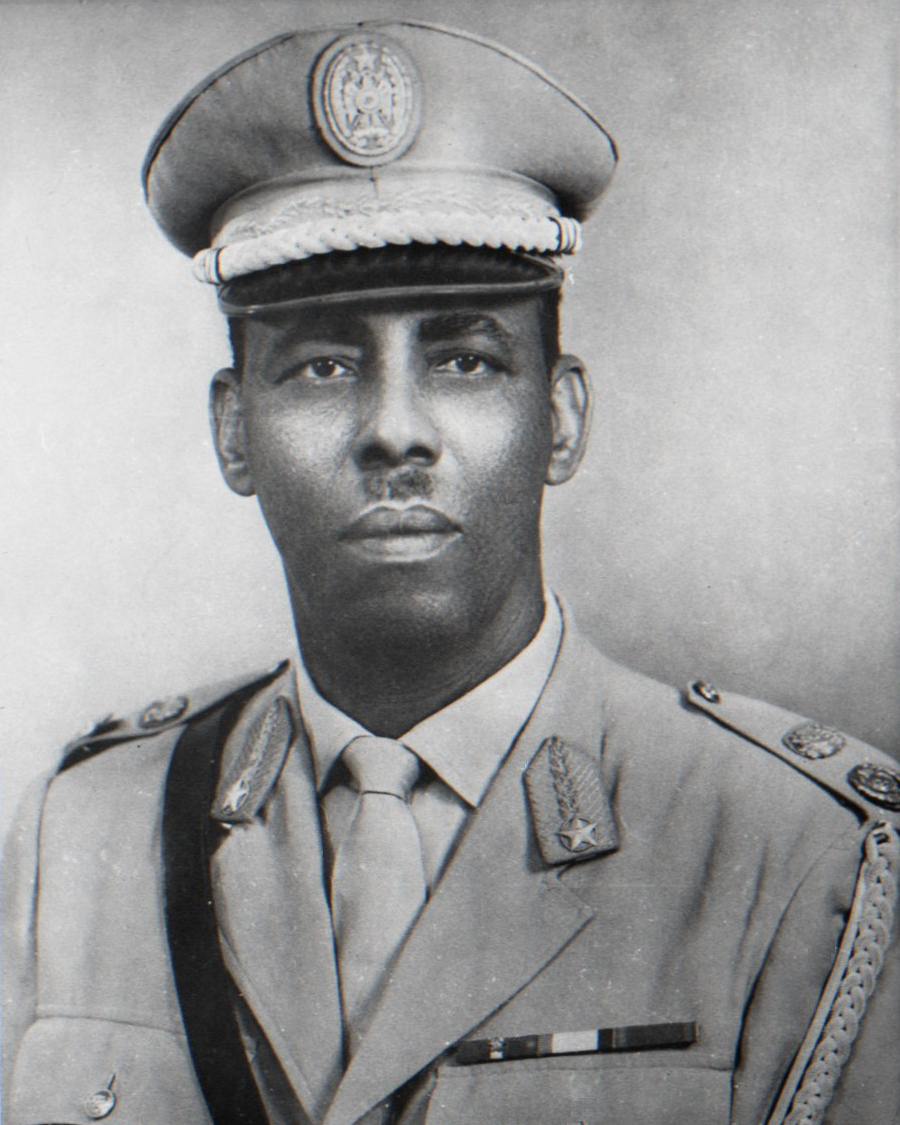
President of Somalia, Major General Siad Barre

On 30 December, violence escalated "an order of magnitude" as militants entered Mogadishu, which was quickly enveloped by a general state of lawlessness. On 30–31 December, diplomats, including many stationed in offices elsewhere in the city, were collected and housed in the embassy compound, except two volunteers who remained in the embassy's K-7 residential apartments located across Afgoy Road from the embassy. The volunteers in the K-7 building would be needed as look-outs for the embassy compound's main gate. (Note: Until the K-7 compound was evacuated on 4 January, the embassy's main gate would only be opened to receive evacuees and send and receive armored vehicles (dispatched to fetch persons elsewhere in the city) when the lookouts radioed that no armed persons were on Afghoy Road.) On the morning of 31 December, the defense attaché was nearly killed when his vehicle was sprayed with bullets and that evening, a soldier at a roadblock shot the tires of a vehicle carrying another defense official. Attempts by the US and other nations' diplomats, in particular the Italian embassy, to negotiate a ceasefire for foreigners to leave were unsuccessful. Afgoy Road became a "shooting gallery", preventing those in safe-havens outside the embassy from reaching it. On New Year's Day, the first American civilians began to seek refuge at the embassy.

Ambassador Bishop requested an evacuation of the American community on 1 January, indicating that the evacuation could be with the planned Italian, French, or German evacuation efforts, but preferred an evacuation by the US military. The State Department authorized the evacuation on 2 January and on that day, Ambassador Bishop specifically requested an evacuation by the US military, thereby initiating Operation Eastern Exit. Ambassador Bishop had spent a considerable amount of time discussing contingency plans for evacuation with other diplomatic posts. Ultimately, ten heads of missions—eight ambassadors and two chargés d'affaires—along with their staff sought refuge in the US embassy compound and were evacuated.

== Plans, mobilization, and escalating violence ==
Ambassador Bishop had visited Central Command in August 1990, where he worked with military experts to update the embassy's E&E plan. The first notice that an evacuation of the Mogadishu embassy would be needed came on the morning of 1 January, when the top naval commander at Central Command sent a message to his naval operations staff: "Better have Amphib crowd take a look at a helo NEO of Mogadishu! time/distance to get there from Masirah OP area." Following the ambassador's 2 January evacuation request, the commander of Central Command ordered Air Force aircraft to the region, the movement of amphibious ships to Mogadishu, and requested United States Special Operations Command to prepare for a noncombatant evacuation operation.

The initial plan was to evacuate via Mogadishu International Airport. Soon after the evacuation request, the United States Air Force deployed C-130 transport planes and an AC-130, for gunfire support, to Nairobi, Kenya, awaiting clearances to enter Somalia and the ability to safely transfer evacuees from the embassy to the airport. However, the US and other foreign embassies were unable to contact anyone within the government to obtain clearances. It also became apparent that the rebels had an ineffective command-and-control structure, making it impossible to negotiate any ceasefire or guarantee of safe passage. Likewise, government troops faced a command-and-control problem; reports indicated that army units were separating along clan lines, in some cases soldiers shot officers of a different clan when given orders they disagreed with. Thus, it became clear that safe passage to the airport would not be possible. Several other nations also had aircraft mobilized to reach Mogadishu, but faced the same problems of landing and transit of evacuees to the airport.

On 4 January, several incidents, including a couple exchanges of gunfire, suggested that the embassy's security detail was insufficient to hold off armed Somalis until the USS Guam and USS Trenton arrived with their helicopters and Marines, at that time scheduled to arrive on 7 January. The embassy had just six Marine guards, whose job was limited to protecting the chancery. Ambassador Bishop made an urgent request to Washington for two platoons of soldiers to parachute into the embassy to defend it until the ships arrived. The request was denied, but the Ambassador was told that an advance element from the vessels would reach the embassy the following morning.

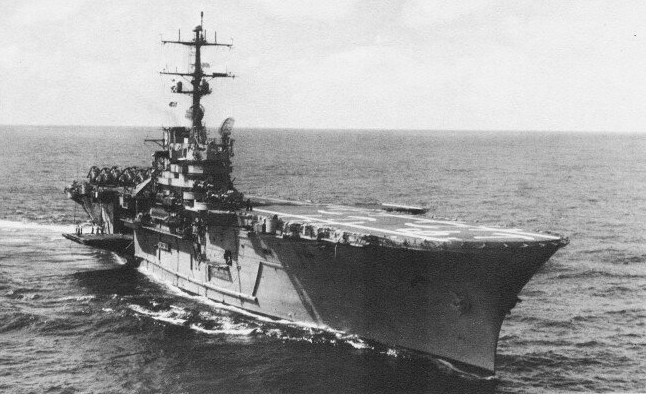
USS Guam

USS Guam and USS Trenton began transit from the coast of Oman towards Mogadishu at 22:30 (23:30 Oman time) on 2 January. The commander of Amphibious Group 2 (PHIBGRU TWO) had initially proposed a seven-ship Amphibious Task Group, composed of vessels anchored at Masirah Island (off Oman) and Dubai and including four amphibious ships so that the full range of amphibious capabilities would be available for the operation. However, intervention in Kuwait seemed imminent (Note: The US and allied countries would intervene in Kuwait two weeks later, on 17 January.) and Commander, U.S. Naval Forces Central Command, did not want to divert that many ships from the Persian Gulf (and was mindful of the ongoing extended deployment of Operation Sharp Edge off Liberia), thus the decision to send just two ships. Although the two vessels were selected by mid-afternoon on 2 January, the transfer of some personnel from Dubai to Masirah and a decision to refuel the two ships (again, due to the potential risk of an extended operation like Sharp Edge) delayed departure by about ten hours. Guam and Trenton carried forces from the 4th Marine Expeditionary Brigade, specifically Charlie Co 1st Battalion 2nd Marines, including a detachment of CH-53E Super Stallion helicopters—the largest helicopters operated by the US military—and two squadrons of CH-46 Sea Knight helicopters.

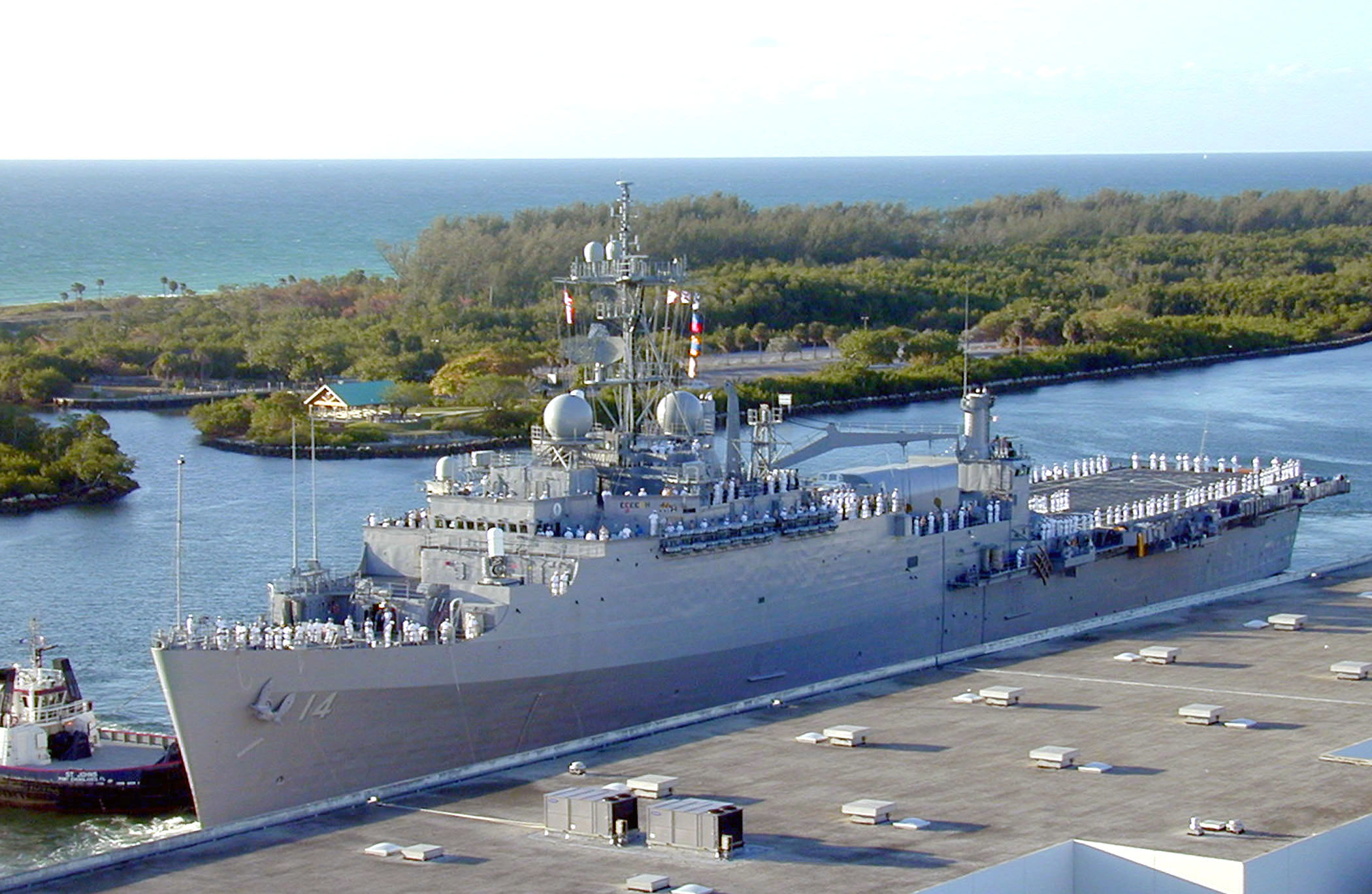
USS Trenton

Planning began in earnest as the ships got underway, with a combined command center on Guam. On the morning of 3 January, the task force's command questioned why they were not given the option of an amphibious landing and requested a tank landing ship be added to the task force. The Seventh Fleet command staff, which were Pacific based, did not understand this request and denied it. The various military staffs were operating with different sets of information. Aboard Guam, a warrant officer who had previously served as a Marine Security Guard (MSG) at the Mogadishu embassy during the mid-1980s was found. The former MSG looked at the aboard ship material and said it was incorrect. The former MSG told planners that a new embassy had been planned and was under construction several years prior. In fact, the new embassy was located further inland. The two ships were from PHIBGRU Two and the Marines from the Second Marine Expeditionary Brigade (MEB), both East Coast commands. They had received old intelligence material about Mogadishu. The Seventh Fleet staff had up-to-date information with the embassy's actual location. After receiving updated information, task force commanders determined that a beach landing, requiring troops to fight their way across the city, was too risky. Initial plans had the ships launch their helicopters at 01:00 on 7 January from just off the coast. However, in response to indications from Ambassador Bishop that conditions in Mogadishu were deteriorating, planners considered 1,050-nautical-mile (1,940 km; 1,210 mi) and, later, 890-nautical-mile (1,650 km; 1,020 mi) flights with the CH-53Es while the ships were still located in the northern Arabian Sea. The situation in Mogadishu stabilized somewhat and the mission was delayed until 5 January.

== Evacuation ==
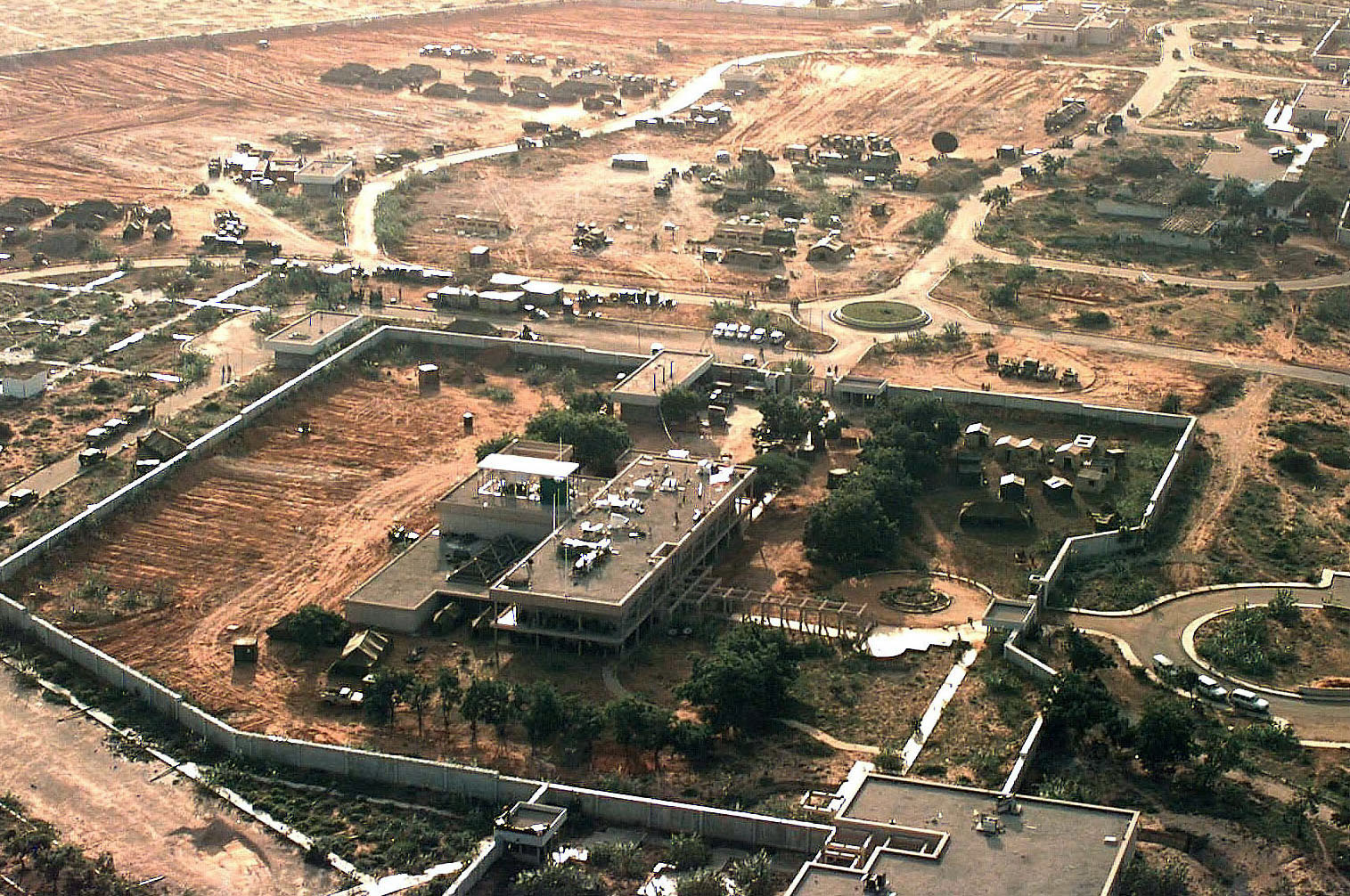
Embassy compound viewed in 1992, after it was re-occupied to serve as headquarters for Operation Restore Hope. The walled chancery (foreground) is most prominent, but it was further located within the walled embassy compound (note wall in upper left, top). The administrative office building (top right) and Marine House (top, right of center) are visible. The helicopter landing zone was between the chancery and Marine House, above the roundabout.

On the evening of 4 January, the final execute order was issued for a 02:45 launch of two CH-53E Super Stallions to arrive at the embassy at dawn. The 60 soldiers selected for the security detail were issued weapons and ammunition. Two Marine Corps KC-130 refueling tankers were mobilized closer to the operation, from Bahrain to Oman, to refuel the helicopters en route to Mogadishu and the two helicopters transferred from Trenton to Guam.

=== Security detail and first evacuees ===
Two CH-53E Super Stallions carrying a 60-man security detail—51 Marines and nine Navy SEALs—departed Guam at 02:47, 466 nautical miles (863 km; 536 mi) from the embassy, and were expected to arrive at 06:20. They performed two aerial refuelings. During the first refueling, a pipe burst on one of the helicopters, dousing Marines in fuel and nearly forcing a return to the Guam; problems with the helicopters' navigation system also complicated the refueling rendezvous. The helicopters arrived in Mogadishu at dawn, crossing the coast just south of the harbor at 25–50 feet (7.6–15.2 m) in altitude on a route that was planned to avoid areas of more intense violence reported in the northern parts of the city. On their arrival in Mogadishu, the crew of the helicopters were using an outdated 1969 map, which showed the embassy in an isolated area. Furthermore, they had been told the embassy could be discerned by its white stucco perimeter wall and golf course. The embassy was, in fact, surrounded by new development and the crew saw white stucco walls around many buildings in the city. The helicopters were flying too low to spot a strobe light which was placed on the embassy's water tower (the highest point within the embassy compound) and the golf course in the embassy compound had a black, oil-coated surface—not the familiar green grass that the helicopter crew would recognize.After breaking radio silence (their only direct communication with the embassy was unencrypted) to contact the embassy, they were able to discern it and land at 07:10. As they arrived, a group of about 100 to 150 Somalis were attempting to enter the embassy compound via ladders on the wall, but scattered as the helicopters arrived.

The security detail moved to establish a perimeter around the embassy compound and the Air Force's AC-130 arrived to provide overhead support. Ambassador Bishop gave the security detail clear instructions on the rules of engagement: they could only use deadly force if people came over the embassy compound's walls with obvious hostile intent. He also identified three zones of defense, stating a preference to retreat to the third zone before the use of deadly force:

- the entire embassy compound
- the Chancery, Joint Administrative Office (JAO) building, Marine House, and the helicopter landing zone (HLZ)
- the chancery and JAO buildings (the two "safehaven" buildings where the evacuees were held)

Ambassador Bishop clearly explained his rationale to the security detail, which was to avoid any impression that they were intervening in the violence in Mogadishu. He feared that the embassy would be targeted by organized attacks if any group involved in the clashes got the impression that the US was intervening in the conflict. To this effect, he requested the Voice of America and BBC broadcast announcements that the forces were present only to evacuate the embassy and would not interfere in the conflict. The Marines who had been doused in fuel during the refueling were able to take a shower and wash their clothes.

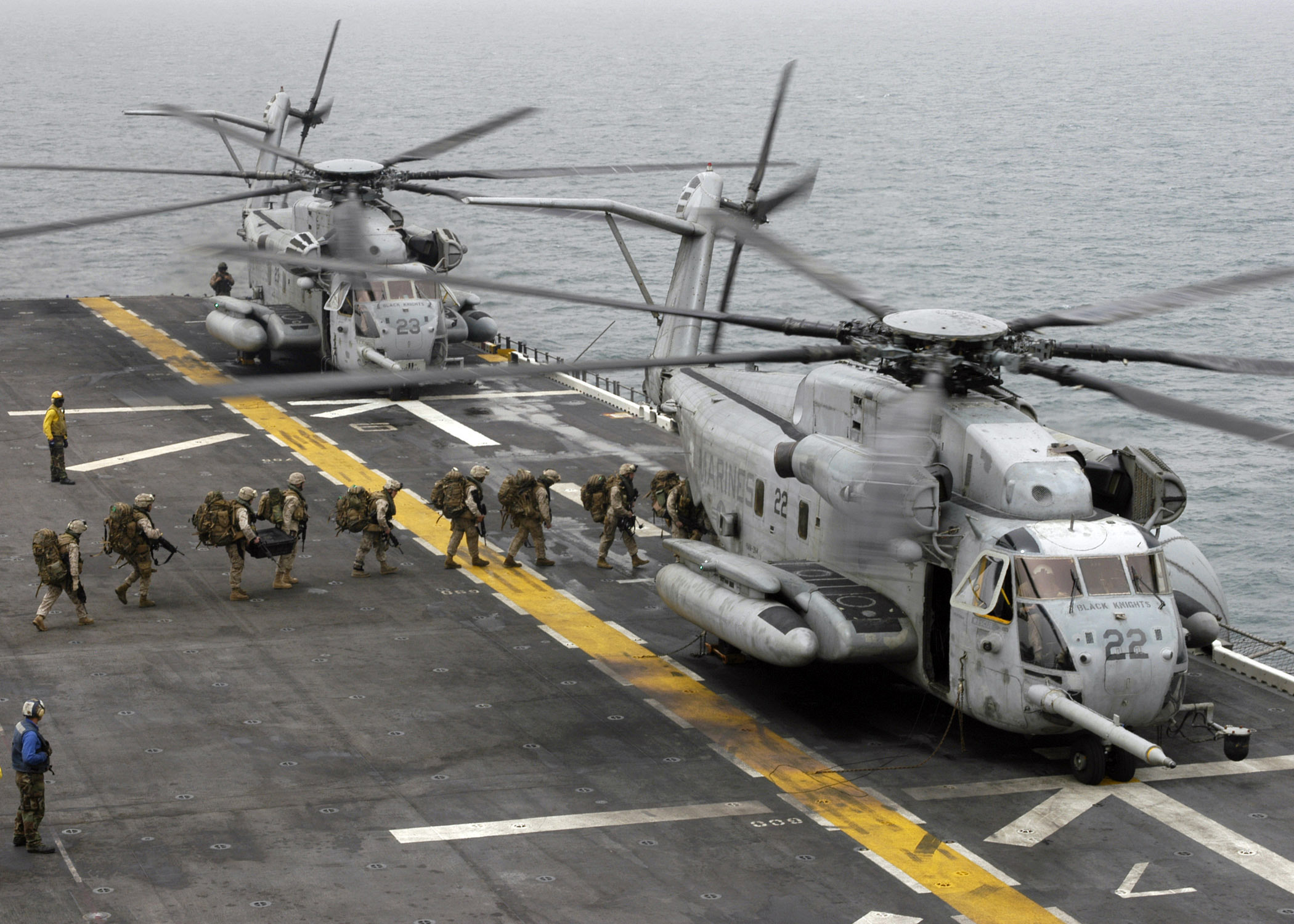
Marines board two CH-53E Super Stallion helicopters (with refueling probes attached) on USS Bataan, a ship similar to Guam

After an hour on the ground, the helicopters left with the first 61 evacuees, including all American civilians and four heads of mission. Evacuees were provided blankets on one of the flights to remain warm. Complications with the only in-flight refueling on the return nearly prevented refueling, which would have forced the helicopters to divert to the Somali desert and await a rescue. At 9:40, the helicopters arrived on Guam and unloaded the evacuees.

=== Embassy during the day ===
No threats came upon the embassy during the day, although truckloads of armed Somalis frequently drove by the embassy along Afghoy Road. Only one incident seemed to directly target the embassy. A sniper and a spotter were positioned on the embassy's water tower (the highest structure in the compound) and came under fire; they were ordered to not return fire and soon thereafter ordered to leave their position on the water tower.

The Office of Military Cooperation, just one and a half blocks from the embassy, required evacuation. Despite its proximity to the embassy, an armed convoy was needed to evacuate persons trapped there by the unrest. A convoy of vehicles with several Marines and SEALs left the embassy at 8:47 and returned ten minutes later with 22 persons from the OMC (four Americans, a Filipino, and 17 Kenyans). This was the only excursion outside the embassy by the security detail. Throughout the day, foreign diplomats contacted the embassy desiring to be evacuated; the US welcomed these requests, but required all of them to find their own transportation to the embassy.

A Somali officer who had a previous relationship with the embassy, Major Siad, agreed to travel to rescue the German chargé d'affaires and British ambassador (junior staff from the British embassy had previously come to the US embassy). The Soviet Union was unable to land a plane in Mogadishu the previous day and the Soviet ambassador asked Ambassador Bishop if he and his staff could be rescued; Ambassador Bishop, a tennis partner of his Soviet counterpart, agreed but only if they found their own way to the embassy. Seeing the helicopters on the morning of 5 January, they realized the Americans would not remain in the city much longer. At the request of Ambassador Bishop, Major Siad agreed to transport the Soviets, but only if he was paid enough; the US embassy paid Major Siad, who returned with the Soviet ambassador and 38 of his staff. The brother of President Barre, who was also a Major General and Chief of Police, showed up at the embassy in the afternoon with 25 members of his family requesting to be evacuated, but was turned away after a vocal conversation with the ambassador.

The operation did not include Marines to handle the evacuation control center (ECC), which was set up in the JAO. A 44-person force consisting primarily of Marines to handle the ECC was planned for insertion with the CH-53E Super Stallions after they had returned to the Guam. However, this was cancelled over objections from the commander of the security detail. The deficit was partially handled by embassy staff who assisted a few soldiers from the security detail. The evacuees were grouped into 15-person "sticks" to be loaded onto the helicopters and were limited to one piece of luggage apiece. Some attempted to bring more, resulting in problems coordinating their evacuation. Furthermore, many evacuees had pets they wanted to bring, which were not allowed. Most pets were killed by their owners; some were given poison. Meanwhile, the Marines were allowed to consume anything they wanted from the embassy's commissary, such as candy, sodas, and souvenirs (most had been stationed on ships for several months). They were also allowed use or take anything they needed from the embassy; the medic filled several bags with medical supplies to return to the ship.

As evening approached, work began to prepare the HLZ for the main evacuation. The area was used as a parking lot and several vehicles were left without keys by staff that had already been evacuated. Some cars had to be broken into to be moved. Chemical lights were placed in the HLZ in a NATO "Y" pattern. The entire mission would be conducted with night vision goggles, which required all lights in the embassy compound to be turned off.

=== Main evacuation ===
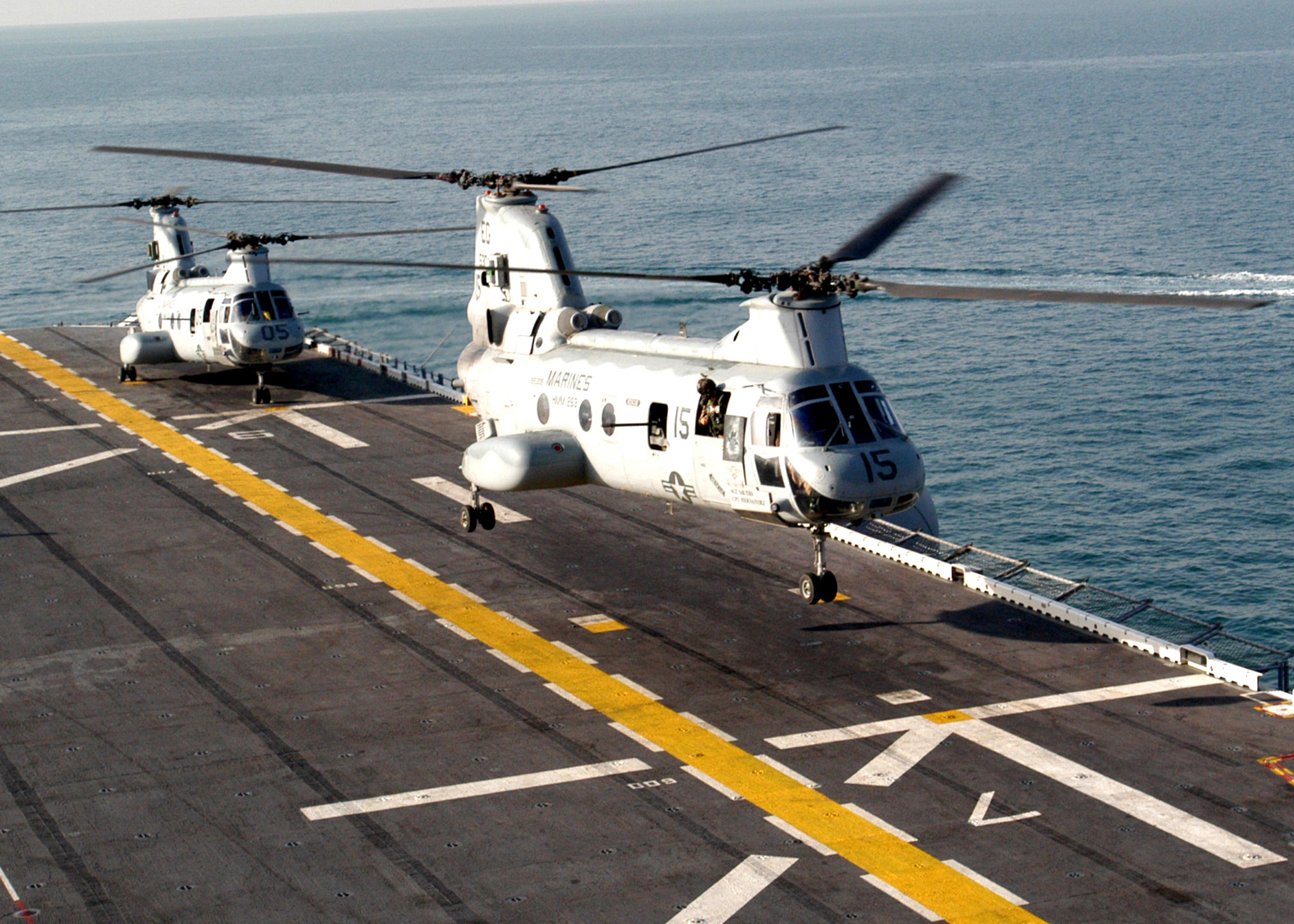
Two CH-46 Sea Knight helicopters departing USS Kearsarge, a ship similar to Guam

The main evacuation occurred in the early morning hours of 6 January and consisted of four waves of five CH-46 helicopters. The timing of this phase was determined by the range of the CH-46 Sea Knight, which lack aerial refueling capability; the ships were about 350–380 nmi (650–700 km; 400–440 mi) away during this phase. An AC-130 was sent from Saudi Arabia to provide gunfire support during the evacuation and two UH-1 Iroquois helicopters were on standby to provide gunfire support, but were not deployed.

The first wave departed Guam at 23:43. As the second wave landed, Major Siad arrived at the embassy gate accompanied by two truckloads of soldiers and held a grenade in one hand and a radio in the other. His request to speak with the ambassador was granted. Major Siad demanded that the evacuation cease immediately because the Somali government had not granted the US permission to carry out such a military operation. He claimed that he would radio soldiers to shoot down the helicopters if the operation continued. The second and third waves were able to depart without incident as the ambassador negotiated with the Major, who finally agreed to settle the matter for several thousand dollars in cash and keys to the ambassador's armored car. Ambassador Bishop remained engaged in conversation with the Major until he reached the helicopter landing zone to depart with the final wave to prevent the Major from reneging on the deal. The final wave departed the embassy at 1:49 and landed on Guam at 2:23; twenty minutes later, Ambassador Bishop declared the evacuation complete.

=== Aftermath at the embassy ===
Armed looters were observed entering the embassy compound as the final wave departed. The doors of the chancery—the main building of the embassy—were reportedly blown open by RPGs within two hours of the embassy's evacuation. Somali employees of the embassy—known as foreign service nationals (FSNs)—could not be evacuated. Ambassador Bishop tried unsuccessfully to have these employees airlifted to safer parts of Somalia. Many of the FSNs had sought refuge in the embassy with their families and about 30 were hired as guards and protected the embassy throughout the ordeal. Local banks had been closed for some time and the embassy was unable to pay the FSNs. The Ambassador left the FSNs with keys to the commissary and warehouse on the embassy compound and they were permitted to take anything they needed.

=== Return to Oman ===
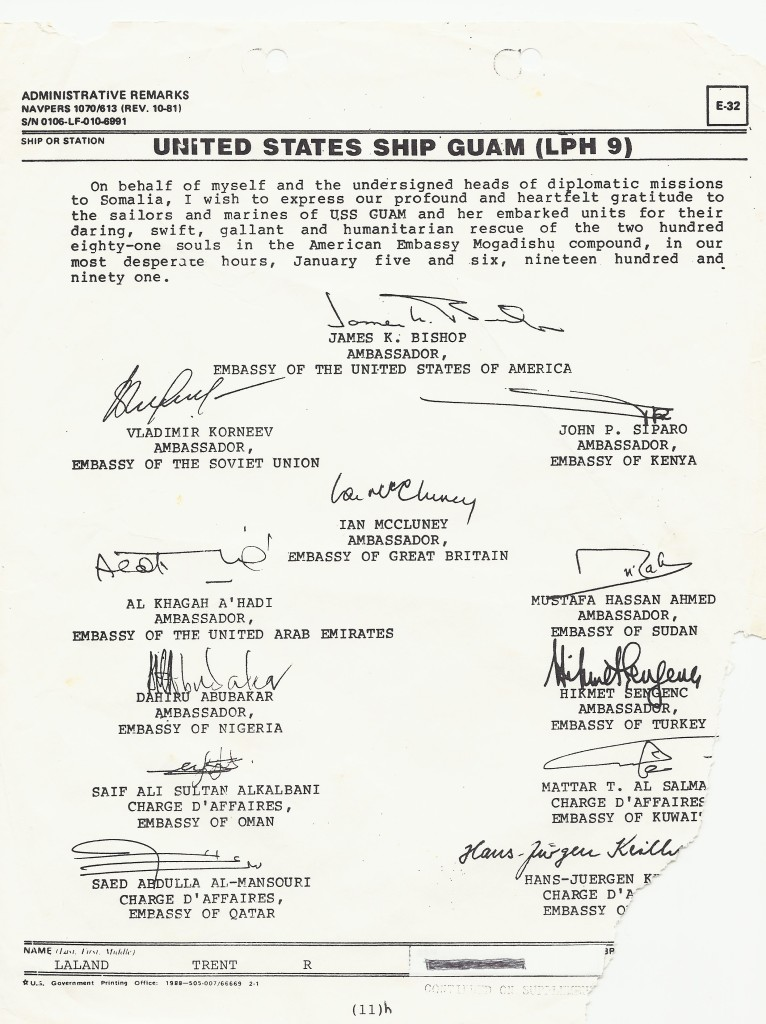
Letter thanking the crew of the USS Guam for the evacuation, signed by the heads of missions that were evacuated

A total of 281 evacuees were taken from the embassy, including 12 heads of missions (eight ambassadors and four chargés d'affaires) and 61 Americans (including Ambassador Bishop and 36 embassy staff). A 282nd evacuee was added to the total with a 10 January Caesarean delivery of a baby aboard Guam. The heads of mission were the ambassadors of the United States, Kenya, Nigeria, Soviet Union, Sudan, Turkey, United Arab Emirates, and United Kingdom and the chargés of the embassies of Germany, Kuwait, Oman, and Qatar.

Rather than disembark in nearby Mombasa, as originally thought by the evacuees, the ships were ordered back to Oman—a five-day journey. The sailors and marines made way for the evacuees to share living quarters. When the chaplain of Guam asked crew to sign up as guides for the evacuees while aboard the vessel, two hundred signed up within an hour, and some of the sailors even dressed up as clowns to ease the ordeal for children. At the request of the ambassadors, a formal session with the ships' senior officers was held to express their thanks. On 11 January, the evacuees were offloaded at Muscat, Oman. That afternoon, the American evacuees were flown to Frankfurt, Germany, from where they continued home.

== See also ==
- List of military operations
- Military operations other than war (MOOTW)
