= Stephen Schwartz (diplomat) =

American diplomat

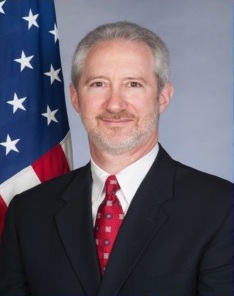

United States Ambassador to Somalia
- In office August 9, 2016 – October 6, 2017
- President: Barack Obama; Donald Trump
- Preceded by: Position re-established James Bishop (as Ambassador in 1991)
- Succeeded by: Donald Yamamoto

Personal details
- Born: 1958 (age 67–68) Buffalo, New York, U.S.
- Education: Miami University; SOAS, University of London; National Defense University
- Profession: Diplomat

Stephen Michael Schwartz (born 1958) is an American career diplomat. He served as the United States Ambassador to Somalia from July 2016 to October 2017.

== Early life ==
Stephen Schwartz was born in Buffalo, New York.

Schwartz was educated at the Williamsville South High School in Williamsville, New York. He graduated from Miami University with a bachelor of science degree in 1980 and is a member of the Sigma Chi fraternity who honored him as a Significant Sig in 2018. He earned a master of arts degree from SOAS, University of London in 1988, and a master of science degree from the National Defense University's National War College in 2008. He served as a Peace Corps volunteer in Cameroon and Washington, D.C.

== Career ==
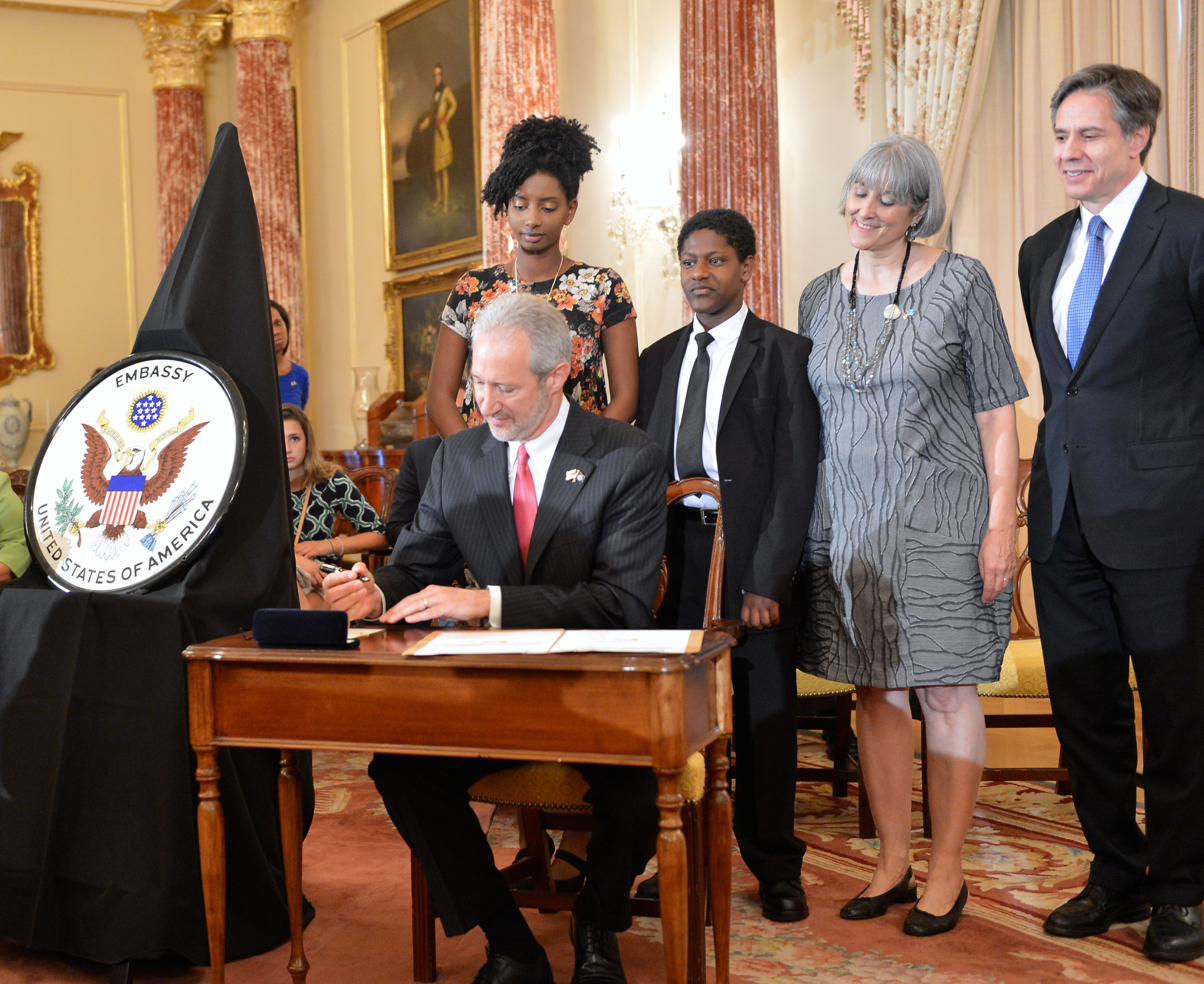
Stephen Schwartz signs his appointment papers to become the next U.S. Ambassador to Somalia during a ceremony at the U.S. Department of State in Washington, D.C., in July 2016

Upon joining the United States Foreign Service, Schwartz served in Addis Ababa, Ethiopia; Bujumbura, Burundi; and Nairobi, Kenya. He subsequently served in Havana, Cuba; Pretoria, South Africa; and Port Louis, Mauritius, followed by the Office of Australia, New Zealand and the Pacific Islands; and Lusaka, Zambia. He served as chargé d'affaires to Comoros, Mauritius and the Seychelles from June 2005 until October 2006. He served as Director of the Office of West African Affairs, Bureau of African Affairs, from 2013 to 2015.

Schwartz served as the United States Ambassador to Somalia from July 2016 to October 2017. He resigned on October 6, 2017.

Diplomatic posts
Preceded by James Keough Bishop	United States Ambassador to Somalia; 2016−2017	Succeeded by Donald Yamamoto
