= USS Guam (LPH-9) =

Iwo Jima-class amphibious assault ship

Coordinates: 31°14′22″N 71°16′35″W

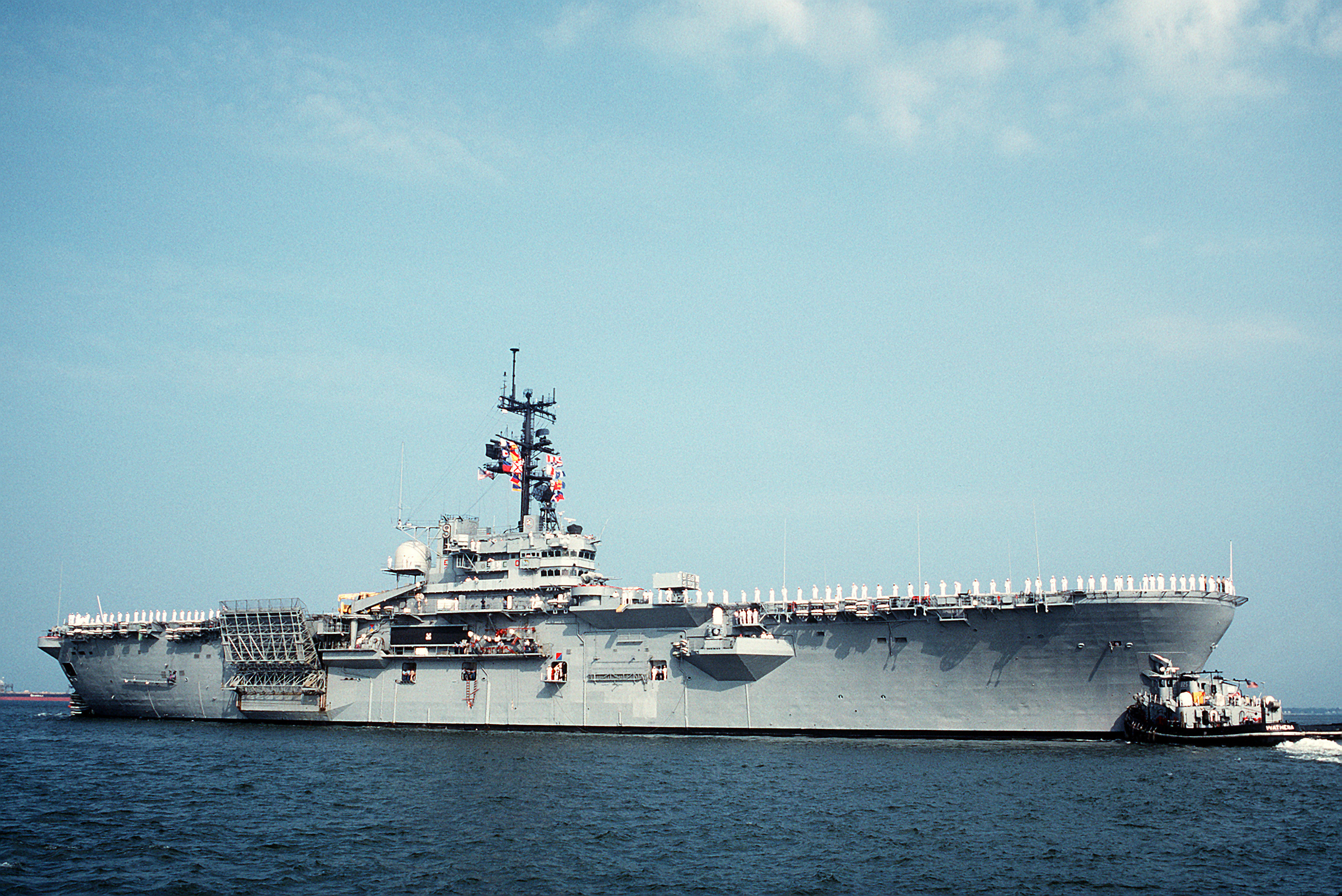
- USS Guam on 23 August 1990

History

United States
- Name: Guam
- Namesake: Guam
- Ordered: 21 December 1959
- Builder: Philadelphia Naval Shipyard
- Laid down: 15 November 1962
- Launched: 22 August 1964
- Commissioned: 16 January 1965
- Decommissioned: 25 August 1998
- Stricken: 25 August 1998
- Identification: Callsign: NAHM; Hull number: LPH-9
- Motto: Swift and bold
- Fate: Sunk as target, 16 October 2001

General characteristics
- Class & type: Iwo Jima-class amphibious assault ship
- Displacement: 19,217 tons
- Length: 603 ft (184 m)
- Beam: 84 ft (26 m)
- Draught: 30 ft (9.1 m)
- Propulsion: 2 × 600 psi (4 MPa) boilers, one geared steam turbines, one shaft, 22,000 shaft horse power
- Speed: 23 knots (43 km/h)
- Complement: 718 (80 officer, 638 enlisted)
- Armament: Initially: 2 × 2 3-inch (76 mm) / 50 caliber DP guns, 8 cell Sea Sparrow BPDMS launchers, Later: 2 × Phalanx CIWS
- Aircraft carried: 20 × CH-46 Sea Knights, 10 × MH-53E Sea Stallion, 3 × AH-1 Cobra

USS Guam (LPH-9), was an Iwo Jima-class amphibious assault ship, and was laid down by the Philadelphia Naval Shipyard on 15 November 1962; launched on 22 August 1964, sponsored by Mrs. Vaughn H. Emory Green, and commissioned on 16 January 1965. She was the third US Navy ship to carry the name, after the US Territory of Guam.

== 1960s ==
After fitting out and builder's trials, the new amphibious assault ship joined the U.S. Atlantic Fleet on 21 April 1965 and sailed for Norfolk, her homeport. Arriving Hampton Roads the next day for training off the Virginia Capes, she departed Hampton Roads for underway training out of Guantanamo Bay, Cuba.

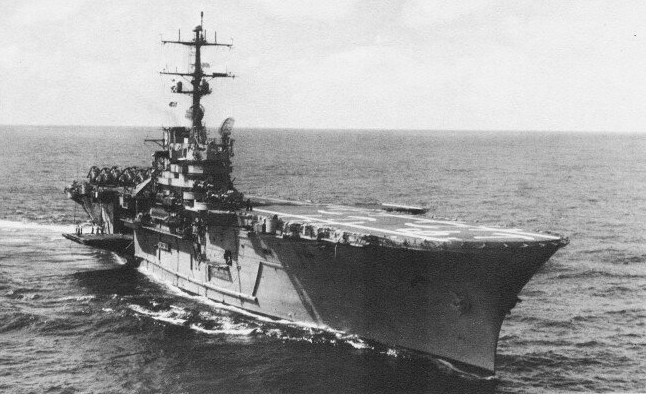
Guam in the Caribbean, 1965.

Guam returned to Norfolk on 5 July 1965 for intensive amphibious training. She sailed from Hampton Roads on 29 November 1965 to participate in amphibious and anti-submarine warfare exercises en route to the Caribbean. On 10 December 1965, Guam joined the Amphibious Ready Squadron in the Caribbean as flagship for Amphibious Squadron 12. There she operated at peak readiness to protect the peace and security of the Caribbean and Central America.

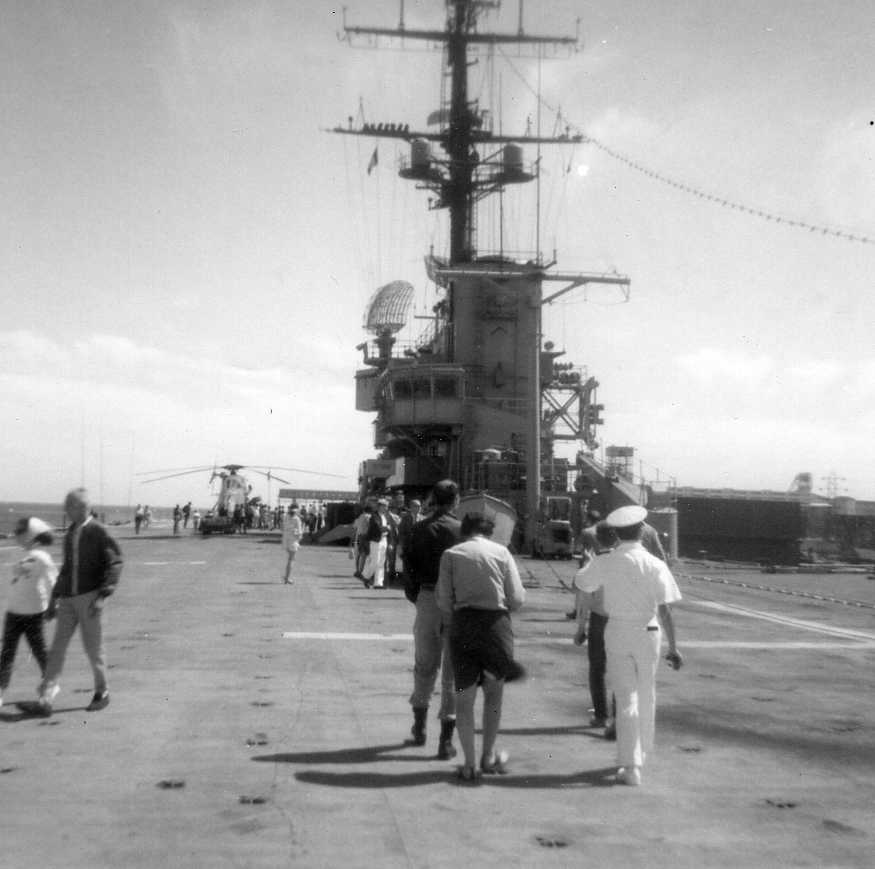
Deck of Guam, while in port in Halifax Harbour in 1969.

From 16 to 28 February 1966, Guam patrolled south of the Dominican Republic ready to land forces on the volatile island of Hispaniola if necessary. She conducted amphibious exercises until entering Philadelphia Naval Shipyard on 1 June 1966 for post shakedown availability.

She departed Philadelphia on 2 August 1966 and prepared for service as the primary recovery ship for the Gemini 11 space flight. On 15 September, at 0959 EDT, Guam recovered Astronauts Pete Conrad and Dick Gordon 710 miles (1,140 km) east of Cape Kennedy. From 28 November to 12 December, Guam participated in Exercise "Lantflex 66", and on the latter date became flagship of Amphibious Squadron 8 and Caribbean Amphibious Ready Group.

== 1970s ==
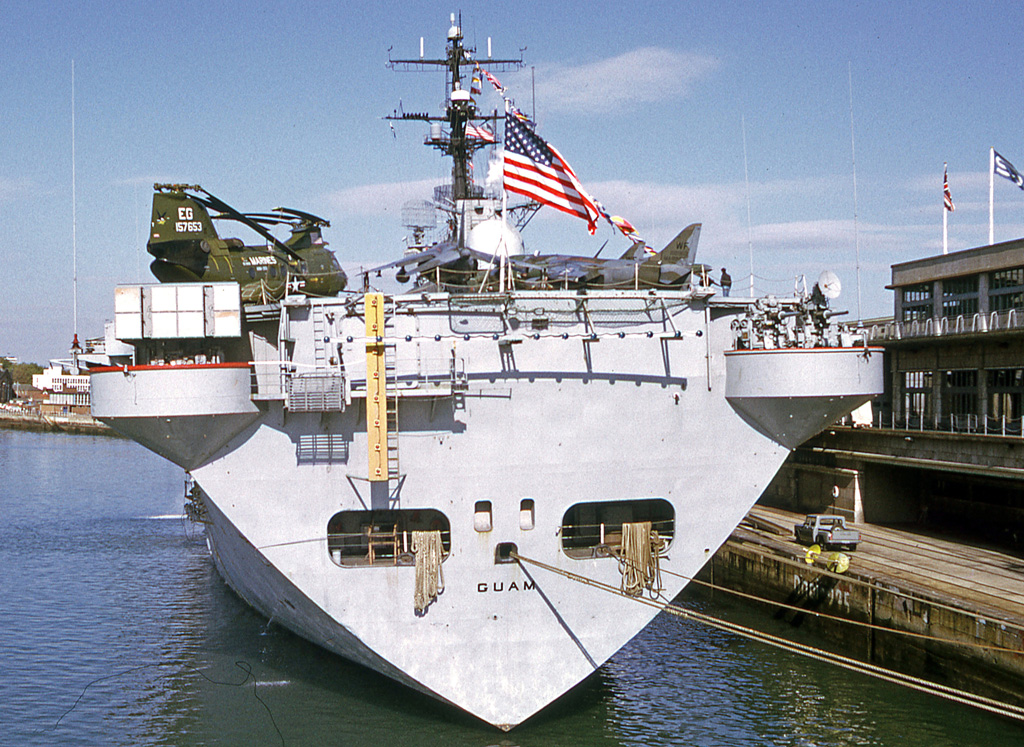
USS Guam visiting Southampton, United Kingdom, in 1974. Visible are a CH-46F Sea Knight and AV-8A Harriers of VMA-513, US Marine Corps.

In the summer of 1971, Guam was chosen as a test vessel for Admiral Elmo Zumwalt's Sea Control Ship concept. This ship was to operate a few VSTOL fighters and some ASW helicopters in order to free up supercarriers from convoy duty during a conflict with the Soviet Union. On 18 January 1972, she began extensive testing and in 1974 deployed in the Atlantic as a sea control ship with Marine Corps AV-8A Harrier VSTOL fighters and Sea King ASW helicopters. Guam completed the SCS tests and reassumed her role as an Amphibious Assault Ship on 1 July 1974. In October 1974 her aircraft complement, operated by the US Marine Corps, comprised six AV-8A, eight CH-46F Sea Knights, five CH-53D Sea Stallions and two Bell UH-1N Iroquis utility helicopters.

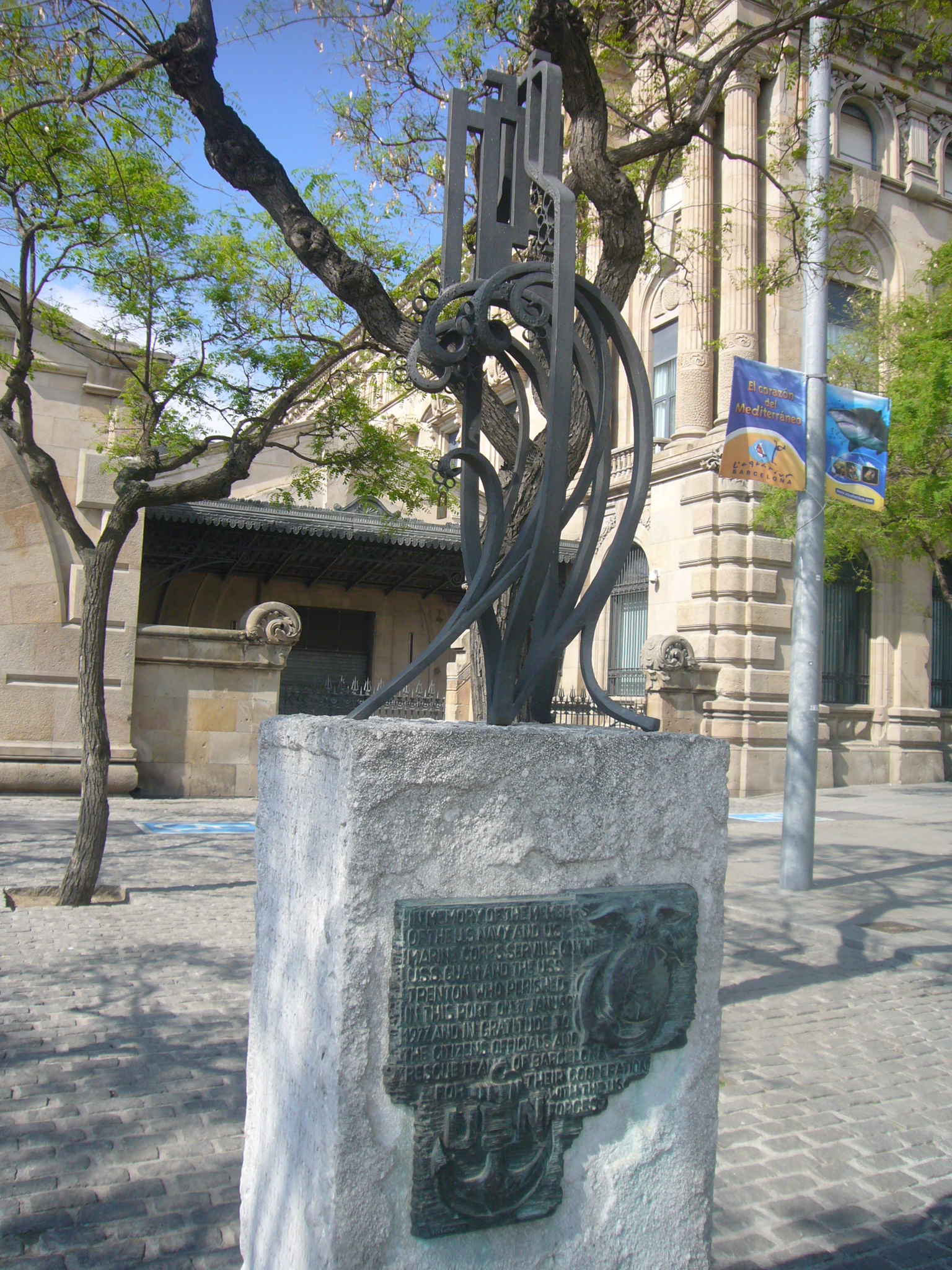
Memorial to those who died in 1977 (Port of Barcelona)

On 17 January 1977, in Barcelona, Spain, a landing craft being used as a liberty boat by USS Trenton and USS Guam, was run over by a freighter. The Mike8 boat capsized and came to rest against the fleet landing pier. Crewmembers from both vessels were on hand to assist with rescue operations. There were over one hundred sailors and marines on board the landing craft. 49 sailors and marines were killed. A memorial is erected at the landing pier in memory.

== 1980s ==
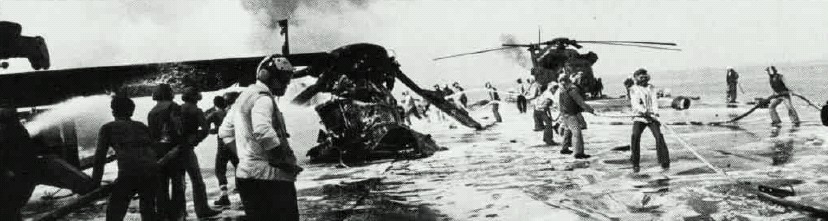
Crewmen fighting a fire after the crash of a Sea Stallion helo in 1981

While operating 50 km southeast of Morehead City, North Carolina (USA), on 19 July 1981, a Sikorsky CH-53 Sea Stallion helicopter crashed into another CH-53 and a Bell UH-1N Twin Huey on landing. Four crewmen died and 10 were injured.

Guam deployed to Beirut in 1982 for the Lebanese civil war as part of a multi-national peacekeeping force.

In October 1983, bound for another stint off the coast of Lebanon, she was redirected to the Caribbean to serve as the flagship for Operation Urgent Fury, the invasion of Grenada. Vice Adm. Joseph P. Metcalf III and his command team of 50 directed the week-long invasion from the flag plot of the Guam, a control center designed to accommodate one quarter that number. After operations in Grenada, she continued onto Lebanon with Amphibious Squadron Four/22nd Marine Amphibious Unit embarked, finally returning to CONUS on 1 May 1984.

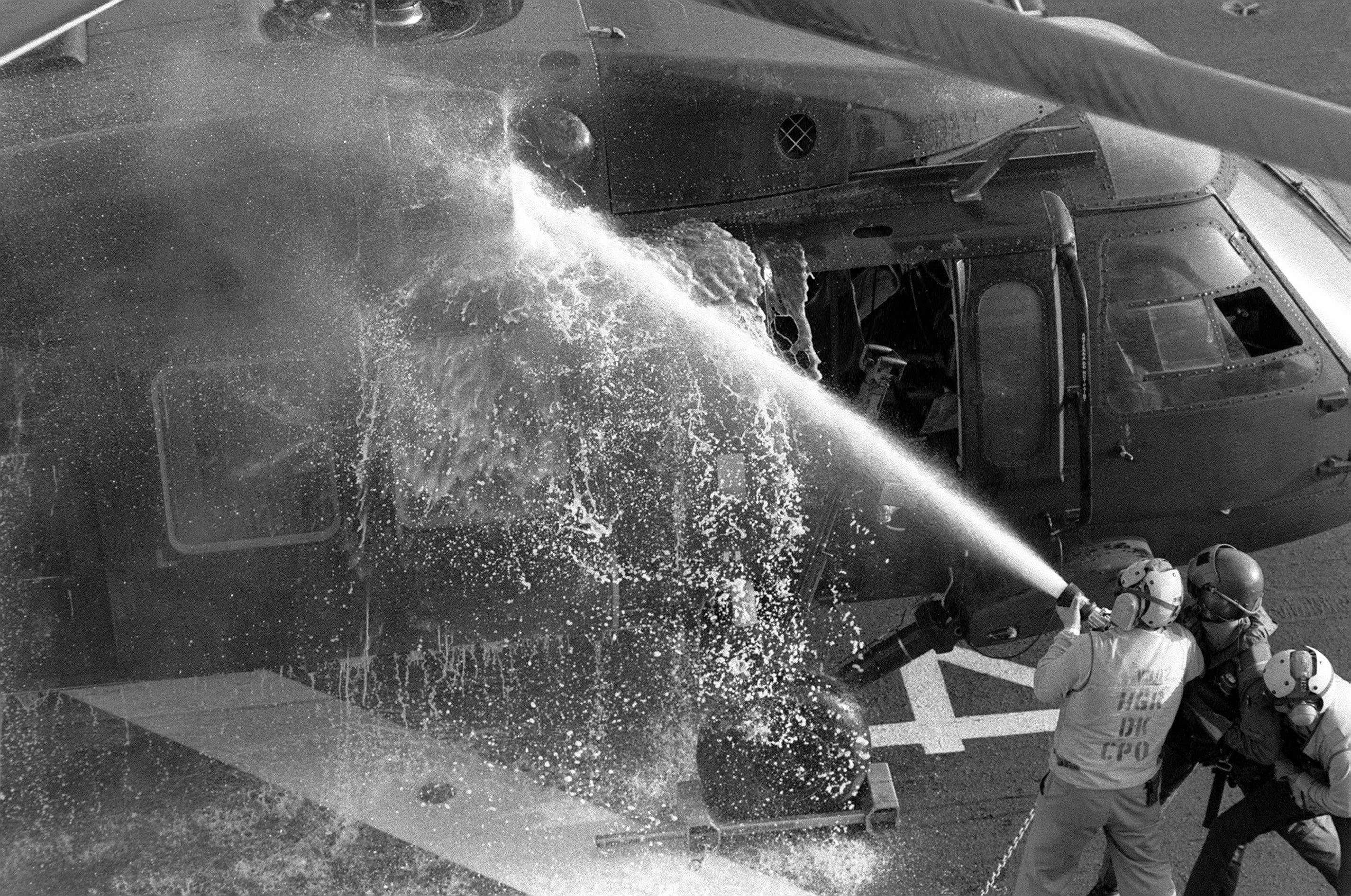
Guam crewmen use a fire hose to subdue a runaway engine on a battle-damaged Black Hawk helicopter during the 1983 invasion of Grenada.

In early 1985, the ship was drydocked at the Philadelphia Naval Shipyard and given a massive overhaul lasting several months. Two Phalanx CIWS were added to the ship at this time.

On 28 January 1986, the USS Guam was steaming south from Norfolk, VA en route to Operational Trials, "Oppies", in the Caribbean sea when, while many crewmen were watching it on TV, the Space Shuttle Challenger blew up just 750 miles South of their location off the coast of FL. USS Guam recovered many floating pieces of debris from the disaster, including a nose-cone from one of the booster rockets. For her around-the-clock efforts in the recovery mission her crew earned a Joint Navy/Coast Guard Meritorious Unit Citation.

May through November 1986 she was deployed on MARG 2–86 in the Mediterranean. During this deployment, the ship was damaged while sailing through a tropical storm off the East Coast of the United States while en route to Rota, Spain. Gross command error had decided to sail directly through the storm, rather than go around it (a very similar event took place off the N.C. coast in 1983). Waves stripped the decking from the fantail, normally 50 ft above the water. All personnel were confined to racks for three days due to immense rocking. The ship stayed at port in Toulon, France for almost three weeks for repairs.

== 1990s and fate ==
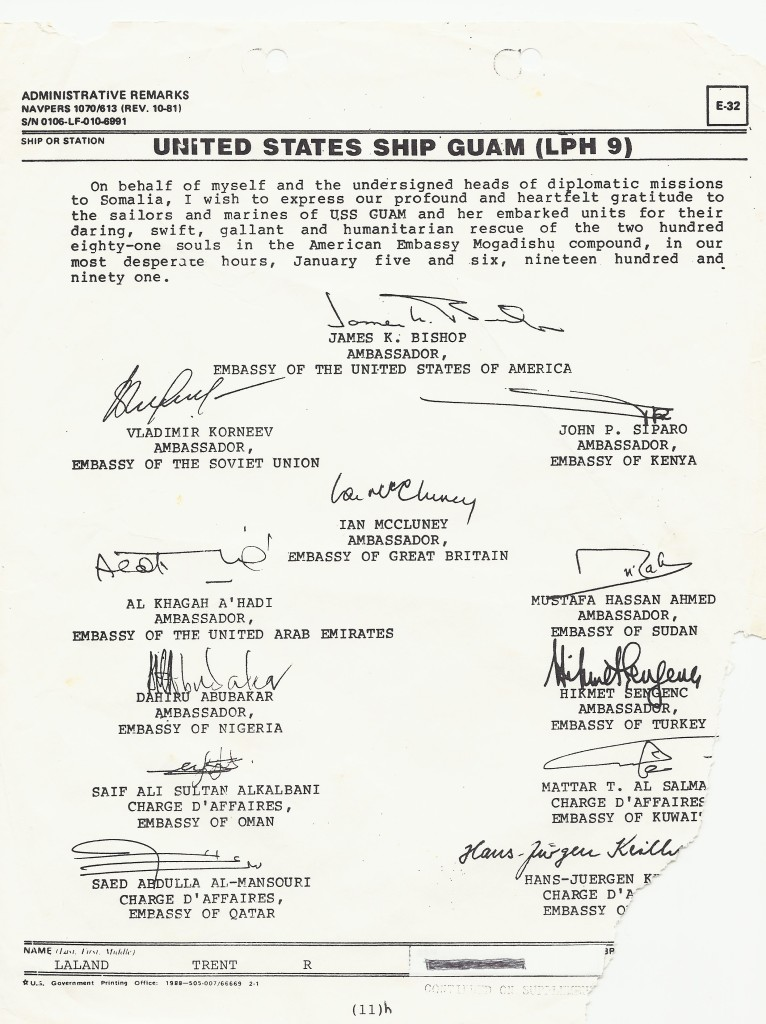
Ambassadors letter of thanks for Operation Eastern Exit

She departed from Norfolk in August 1990, under the command of Captain Chuck Saffell, to deploy to the Persian Gulf for Operation Desert Shield and Operation Desert Storm.

On 2 January 1991, the Guam along with the USS Trenton were dispatched from anchorage off Oman to Somalia to airlift the US embassy in Somalia's capital Mogadishu, which had been suddenly enveloped by violence when rebels entered the city and the central government collapsed. On 5–6 January 281 US and foreign nationals were airlifted from the embassy, including all of the embassy's staff along with diplomats from several nations (notably, the Soviet ambassador to Somalia and 38 Soviet diplomats). The vessels returned to Oman and the evacuees disembarked on 11 January, ending Operation Eastern Exit.

In 1993, she won the Marjorie Sterrett Battleship Fund Award for the Atlantic Fleet.

In 1996, the USS Guam supported the 22nd MEU in Operation Assured Response off the coast of Liberia.

In addition to the MEU's Aviation Combat Element's helicopter load out, the MEU had a CONUS standby package of 4 AV-8Bs (Harriers) that Guam was capable of adding to the flight deck in support of contingency operations. She also conducted Harrier ops as part of the deployment work-up on a regular basis with the exception of the final voyage from September 1997 through April 1998. The last operation conducted was in May 1998 before the final ammunition offload at Naval Weapon Station Yorktown.

The USS Guam was decommissioned on 25 August 1998 and spent several months at the Norfolk Naval Shipyard while the Navy decided what to do with the ship. Guam was disposed of as a target off the US east coast on 16 October 2001. The SINKEX was conducted by the John F. Kennedy Battle Group. USNS Mohawk towed her out to sea and a carrier air wing operating from Kennedy conducted SINKEX. She took over 12 hours to sink most likely due to all watertight compartments sealed by the decommissioning crew. The exact location was 031° 14' 22.0" North, 071° 16' 35.0" West.

Her dual 3"/50cal Mk33 anti aircraft mount is preserved at the Mesa-Arizona Commemoration Air Force Museum. Gemini 11 is now on display at California Science Centre in Los Angeles.

== Awards ==
- Combat Action Ribbon
- Navy Unit Commendation with 6 awards
- Navy Meritorious Unit Commendation with 3 awards
- Navy Battle "E" Ribbon with 6 awards
- Navy Expeditionary Medal
- National Defense Service Medal with 2 awards
- Armed Forces Expeditionary Medal with 7 awards
- Southwest Asia Service Medal
- Armed Forces Service Medal with 7 awards
- Humanitarian Service Medal with 2 awards
- Coast Guard Meritorious Unit Commendation
- Kuwait Liberation Medal (Kuwait)

== Gallery ==
USS Guam Lifecycle

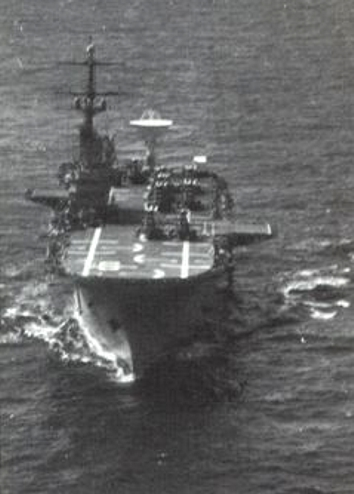
USS Guam during recovery of the Gemini 11 in September 1966.

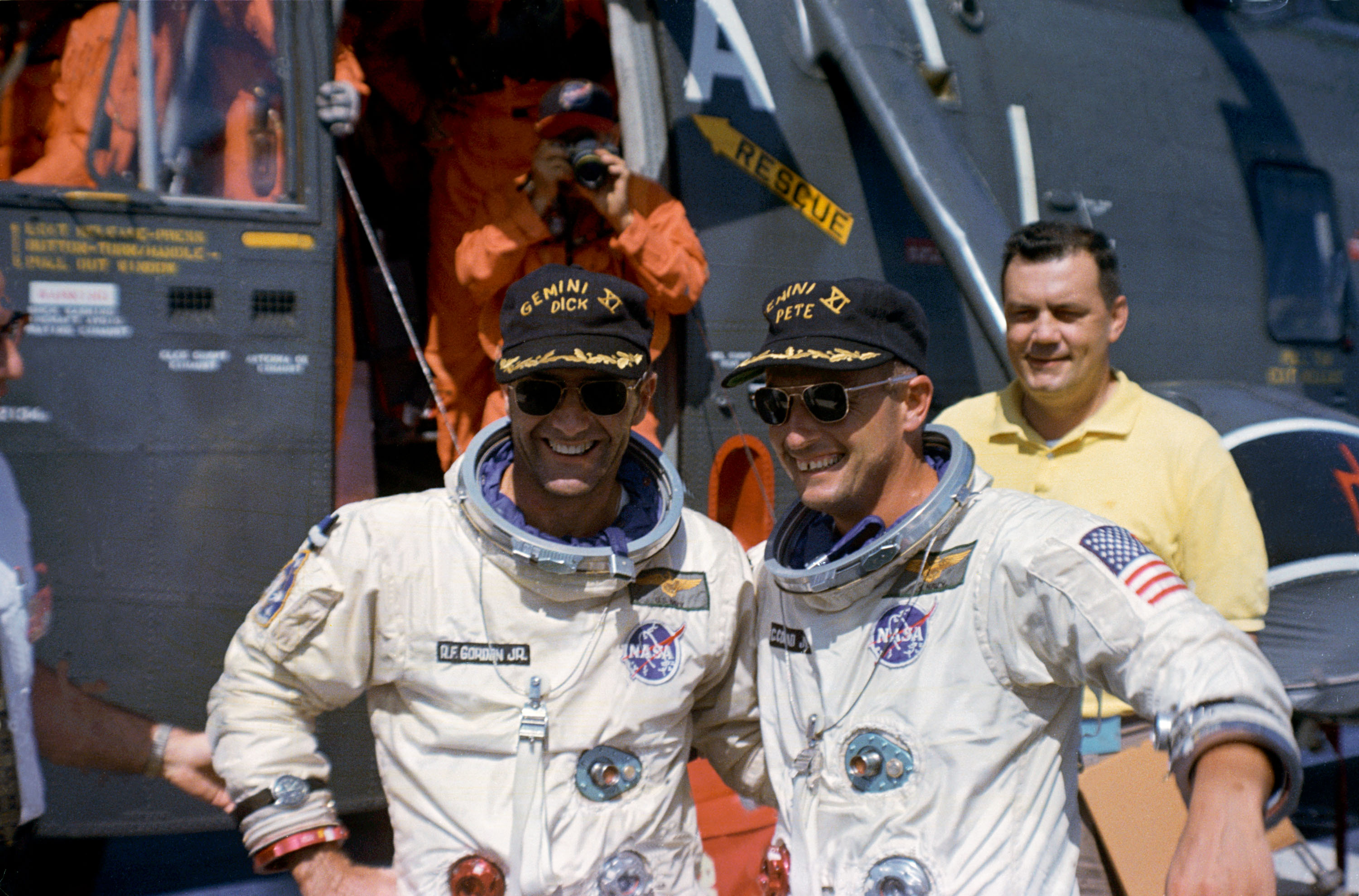
Astronauts Pete Conrad and Richard Gordon pose in front of the recovery helicopter aboard USS Guam on 30 December 1966.

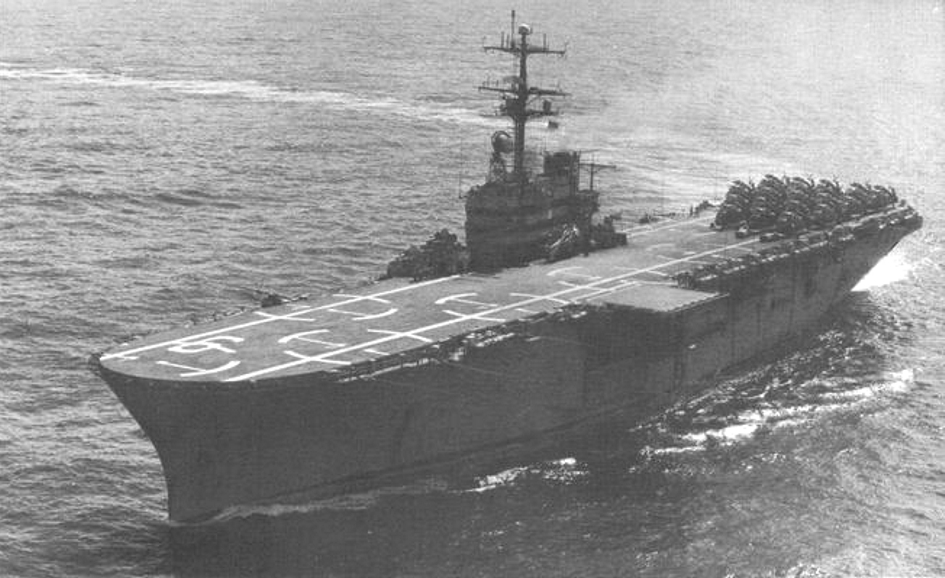
USS Guam underway in 1967.

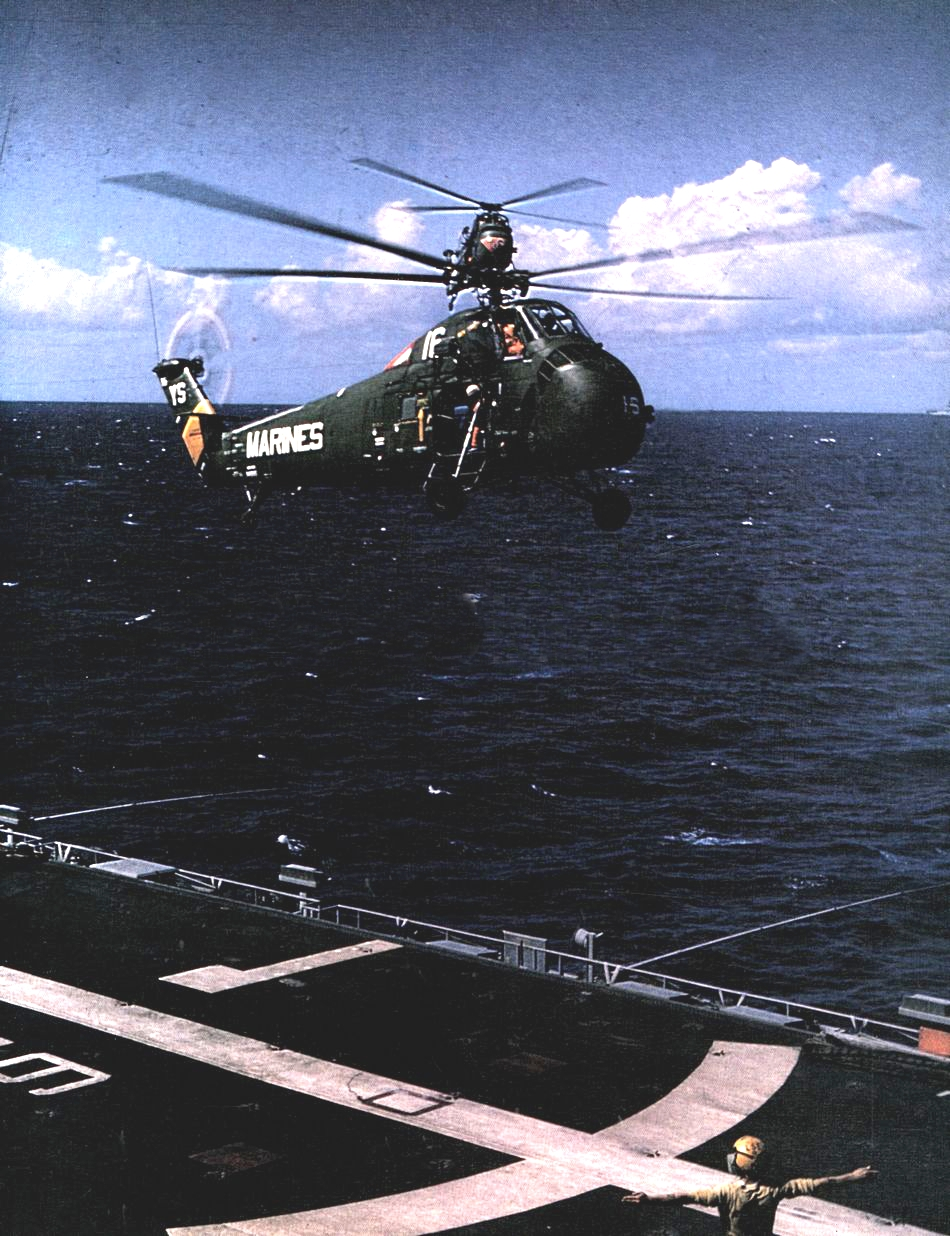
Two Sikorsky UH-34D of HMM-162 approach USS Guam for landing in 1967.

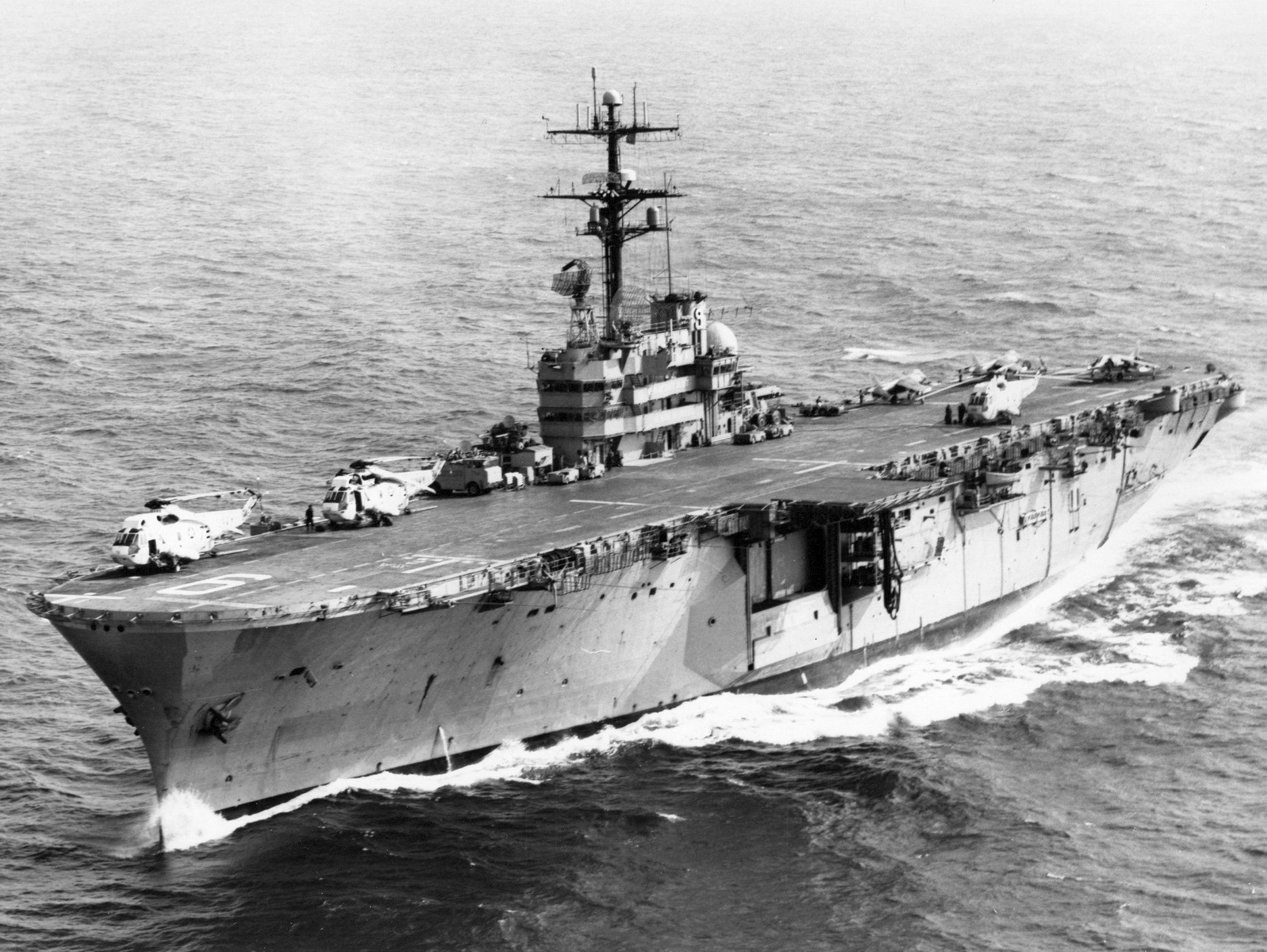
USS Guam in c1973.

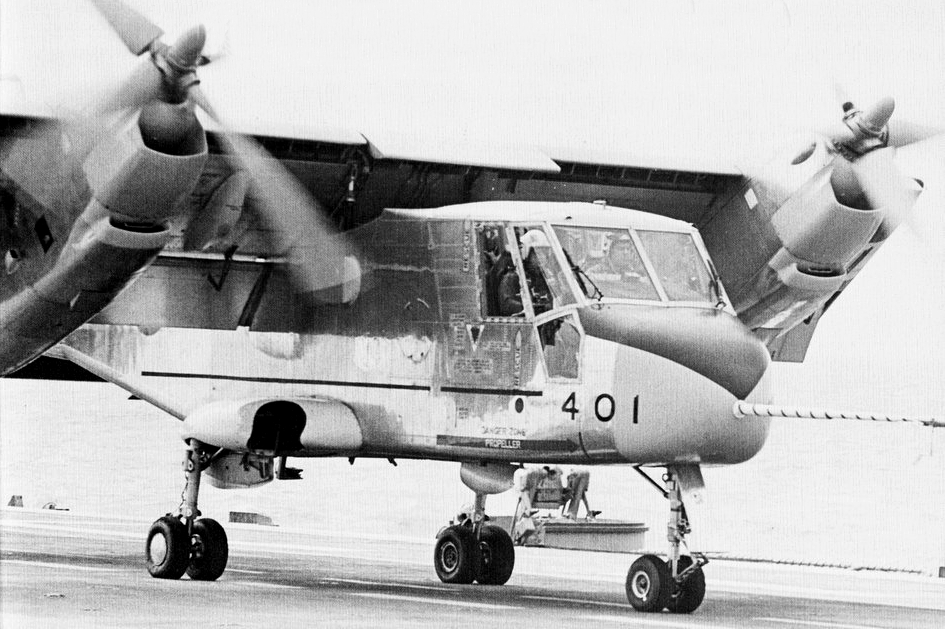
Canadair CL-84 Dynavert on USS Guam in 1973.

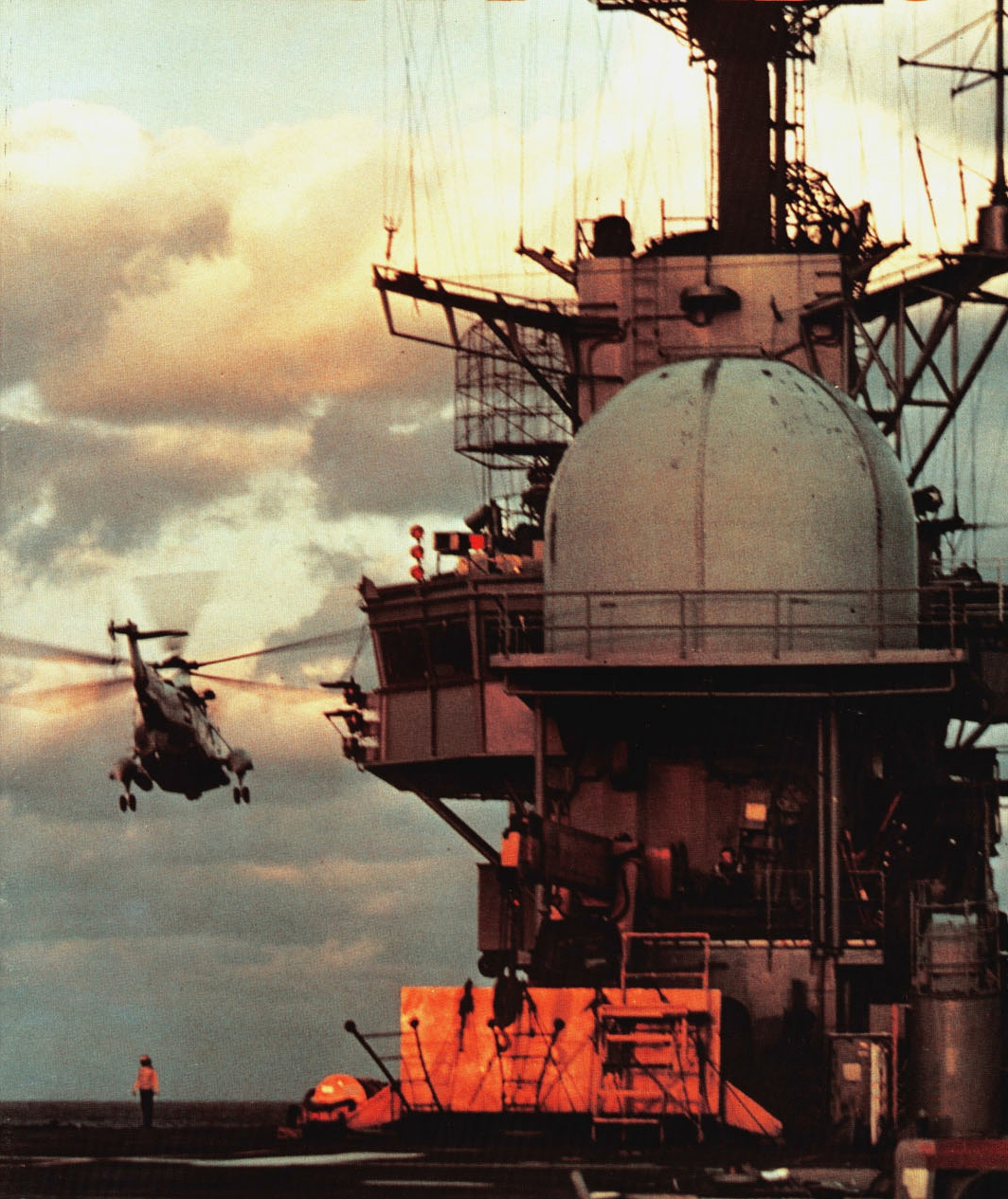
SH-3 Sea King over USS Guam in 1973.

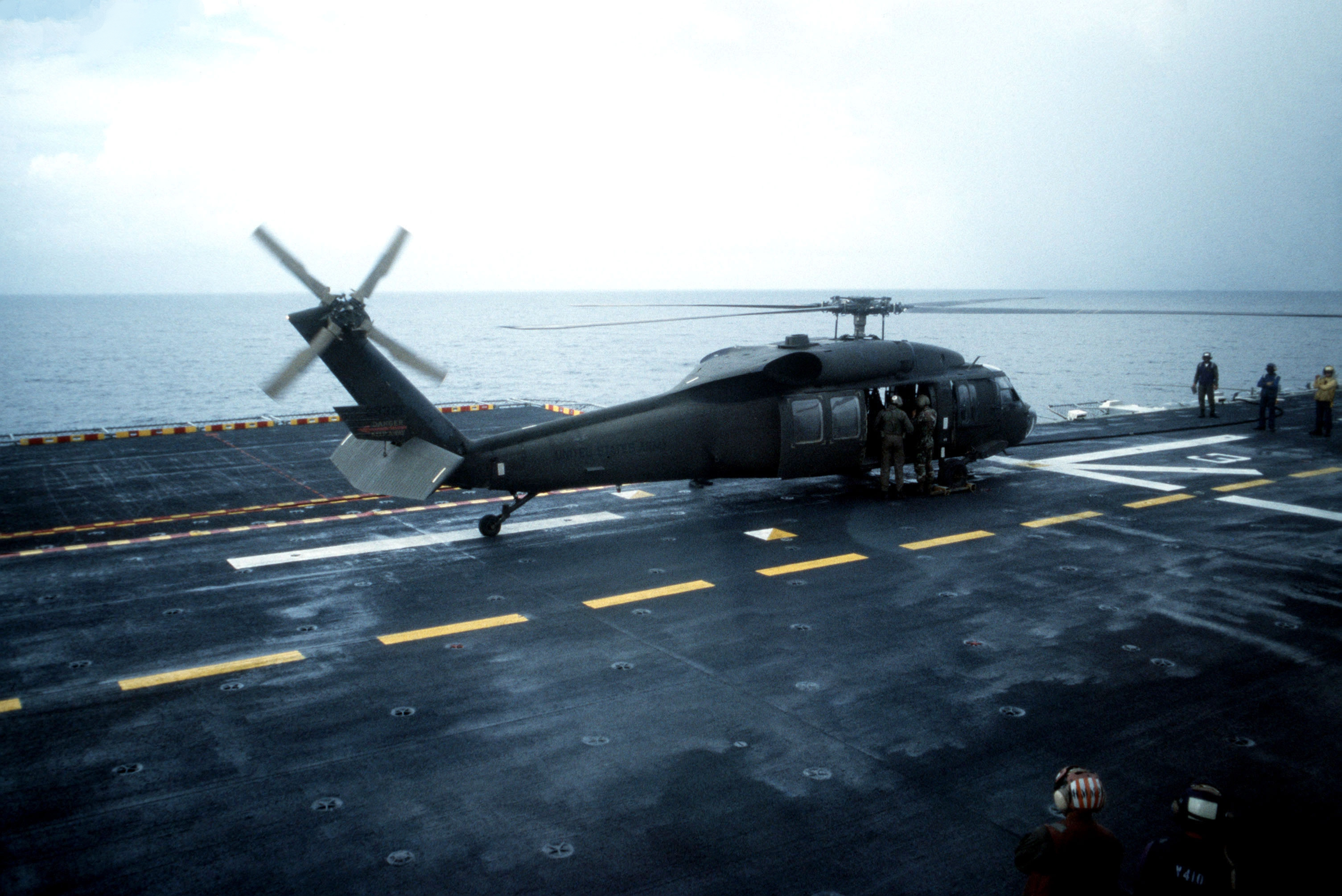
UH-60A on USS Guam off Grenada 1983.

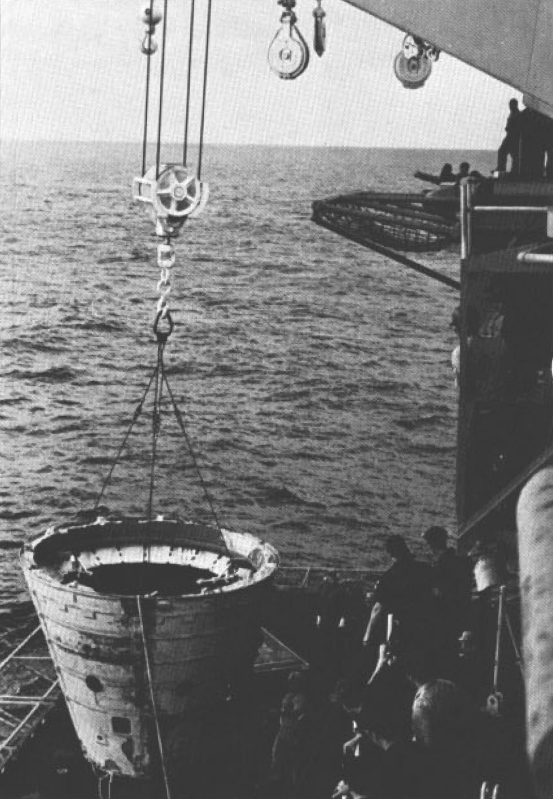
USS Guam recovers space shuttle SRB nose cone in 1986.

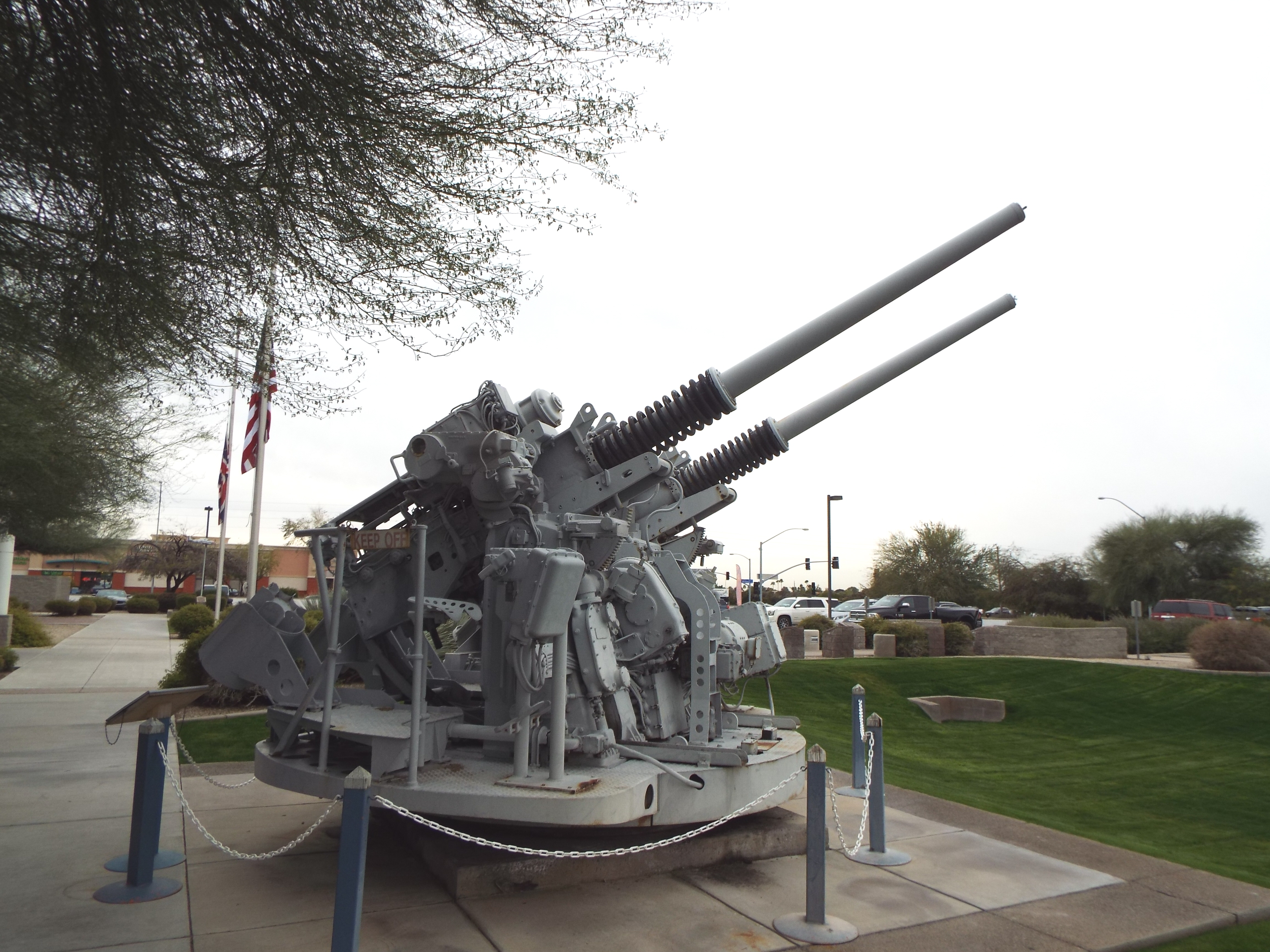
USS Guam's 3inch 50cal dual anti-air gun in Mesa-Arizona Air Force Museum.
