= James Bishop (diplomat) =

American diplomat

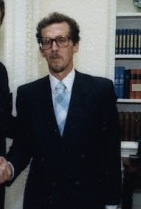
- Bishop in 1987
- Born: July 21, 1938 (age 88); New Rochelle, New York, U.S.
- Education: College of the Holy Cross (BS); Johns Hopkins University (MIIP)
- Occupation: Diplomat
- Years active: 1960-1993
- Known for: U.S. Ambassador to Niger (1979-81), Liberia (1987-90), and Somalia (1990-91)

James Keough Bishop Jr. (born July 21, 1938) is an American Foreign Service Officer, who served as U.S. Ambassador to Niger (1979–81), Liberia (1987-90), and Somalia (1990–91).

Bishop's last ambassadorial posting to Somalia ended in a rescue by the U.S. military in Operation Eastern Exit, when the embassy came under threat as a result of military action in the Somali Civil War.

== Biography ==
=== Early life and education ===
Bishop was born July 21, 1938, in New Rochelle, New York to James Keough Bishop Sr. and Dorothy (née O'Keefe). He graduated from the College of the Holy Cross (B.S., 1960) and Johns Hopkins University's School of Advanced International Studies (M.I.I.P., 1981).

=== Diplomatic career ===
After graduating from college in 1960, Bishop entered the Foreign Service in 1960, where he held the following diplomatic positions:

- press officer at the Department of State, 1961–63
- vice consul in Auckland, New Zealand, 1963–66
- consul in Beirut, Lebanon, 1966
- economic officer in Beirut, Lebanon, 1966–68
- economic officer in Yaoundé, Cameroon, 1968–70
- desk officer for Chad, Gabon, Mauritius and Madagascar, 1970–72
- desk officer for Ghana and Togo, 1972–74
- Deputy Director for West Africa at the Department of State, 1974–76
- Director of North African Affairs at the Bureau of Near Eastern and South Asian Affairs at the Department of State, 1977–79
- Ambassador to the Republic of Niger, 1979–81
- Deputy Assistant Secretary for African Affairs at the Department of State, 1981–87
- Ambassador to the Republic of Liberia, 1987-90
- Ambassador to the Somali Democratic Republic, 1990-91
- Principal Deputy Assistant Secretary of State for Human Rights and Humanitarian Affairs, 1991-93

Bishop retired from the Foreign Service in 1993.

== Personal life ==
Bishop and his wife mechanical engineer Kathleen Marie Kirby (February 14, 1947 – September 29, 2011) have six children and were married from 1977 until Kathleen's death. Bishop and his first wife, attorney Ann Bishop Richardson (December 15, 1940 – April 17, 2012), were married from 1970 to 1976 and have three children and two grandchildren. He is Roman Catholic.

Diplomatic posts
Preceded by Charles A. James	United States Ambassador to Niger; 1979-81	Succeeded by William Robert Casey Jr.
Preceded by Edward J. Perkins	United States Ambassador to Liberia; 1987–90	Succeeded by Peter Jon de Vos
Preceded by T. Frank Crigler	United States Ambassador to Somalia; 1990–91	Succeeded by Stephen Schwartz
