= Katherine Dhanani =

American diplomat

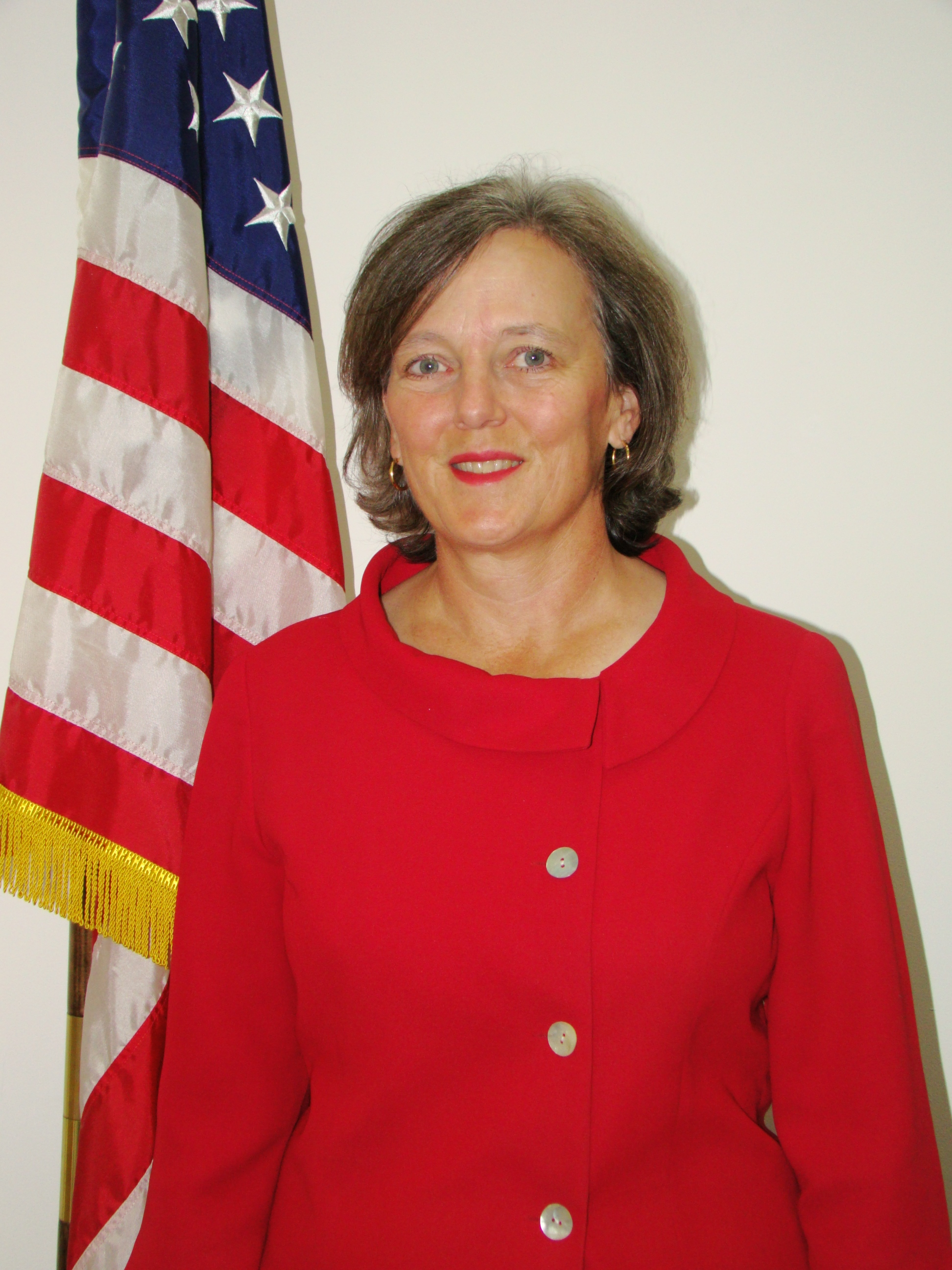
- Dhanani in 2010

Personal details
- Education: Kenyon College; Massachusetts Institute of Technology

Katherine Simonds Dhanani is an American diplomat. She was nominated as the Ambassador of the United States to Somalia, having been nominated for the position on 25 February 2015 by U.S. President Barack Obama. Dhanani is the first official U.S. envoy to the country in over two decades. On May 11, 2015, it was reported that Dhanani had withdrawn her nomination to the post of Ambassador to Somalia for personal reasons.

== Early life and education ==
Dhanani received a B.A. from Kenyon College and an M.A. from the Massachusetts Institute of Technology.

== Career ==
Simonds Dhanani, a career member of the Foreign Service, class of Counselor, and currently serves as the US Consul General in Vancouver, Canada. Previously, she served as Director of the Office of Regional and Security Affairs in the Bureau of African Affairs in the Department of State, a position she held between 2013 and 2017. Dhanani served as Consul General at the U.S. Consulate in Hyderabad, India from 2010 to 2013 and was Deputy Chief of Mission at the U.S. Embassy in Harare, Zimbabwe from 2007 to 2010 as well as at the U.S. Embassy in Libreville, Gabon from 2005 to 2007. Additionally, she was the Political and Economic Section Chief at the U.S. Embassy in Lusaka, Zambia from 2002 to 2005 and Economic Section Chief at the U.S. Embassy in Kinshasa, Democratic Republic of the Congo from 1999 to 2002. She was an Economic Officer at the U.S. Embassy in Mexico City, Mexico from 1998 to 1999 as well as in the Office of Mexican Affairs at the Department of State from 1996 to 1998. Prior to this, she served as Staff Assistant in the Bureau of Inter-American Affairs at the Department of State, as Consular Officer at the U.S. Embassy in Brazzaville, Republic of the Congo and as Economic Officer at the U.S. Embassy in Georgetown, Guyana. She was also Assistant Planner for the City of Sacramento in California and a lecturer at Grinnell College in Iowa.

== See also ==
- Somalia–United States relations
