= 1978 Connecticut State Treasurer election =

State treasurer election

- November 7, 1978
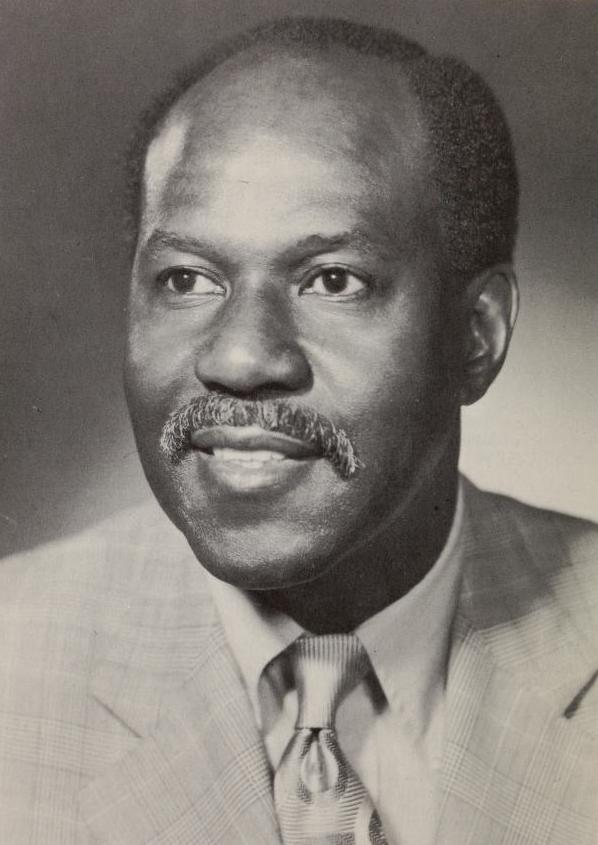

| Nominee | Henry E. Parker | Margaret B. Melady |
| Party | Democratic | Republican |
| Popular vote | 566,529 | 421,367 |
| Percentage | 57.3% | 42.7% |
- Parker: 50–60% 60–70% 70–80% Melady: 50–60% 60–70% 70–80%
State Treasurer before election
Henry E. Parker
Democratic
Elected State Treasurer
Henry E. Parker
Democratic

The 1978 Connecticut State Treasurer election took place on November 7, 1978, to elect the Connecticut State Treasurer. Incumbent Democratic State Treasurer, Henry E. Parker won re-election to a second term, defeating Republican nominee, Margaret B. Melady, a Fairfield university instructor.

This is the last election until 2002 where a Democrat won every county.

== Democratic primary ==
=== Candidates ===
==== Nominee ====
- Henry E. Parker, incumbent state treasurer (1975-1986)

== Republican primary ==
The Republican convention delegation chose Margaret B. Melady, a political newcomer, who was unknown to much of the convention. Following the announcement of her candidacy by convention leaders, Rep. Alan J. Mazolla threatened to run contend for the nomination, but declined to do so before the roll call vote. The convention delegation also considered choosing State Representative Elinor Wilbur of the 133rd district.

=== Candidates ===
==== Nominee ====
- Margaret B. Meladay, SHU assistant professor and wife of Thomas Patrick Melady, Sacred Heart University President and former U.S. Ambassador to Burundi and Uganda

==== Declined ====
- Alan J. Mazolla, State Representative of the 49th district

== General election ==
=== Results ===
1978 Connecticut State Treasurer election
| Party | Candidate | Votes | % | ±% |
|---|---|---|---|---|
| Democratic | Henry E. Parker (Incumbent) | 566,529 | 57.34% | −1.56% |
| Republican | John T. Becker | 421,367 | 42.65% | +2.91% |
| Write-in | N/A | 64 | 0.01% | N/A |
| Total votes | | 987,960 | 100.0% | |
| Democratic hold | | | | |

==== By county ====
Parker won all eight counties.

| County | Henry E. Parker Democratic | | John T. Becker Republican | | Total votes cast | | |
|---|---|---|---|---|---|---|---|
| County | Fairfield | 123,547 | 50.56% | 120,815 | Total votes cast | 49.44% | 244,362 |
| Hartford | 162,218 | 60.96% | 103,903 | 39.04% | 266,121 | | |
| Litchfield | 30,472 | 54.20% | 25,748 | 45.80% | 56,220 | | |
| Middlesex | 26,733 | 58.64% | 18,859 | 41.36% | 45,592 | | |
| New Haven | 145,655 | 58.70% | 102,480 | 41.30% | 248,135 | | |
| New London | 40,299 | 61.35% | 25,392 | 38.65% | 65,691 | | |
| Tolland | 20,395 | 60.03% | 13,582 | 39.97% | 33,977 | | |
| Windham | 17,210 | 61.91% | 10,588 | 38.09% | 27,798 | | |
| Total | 566,529 | 57.34% | 421,367 | 42.65% | 987,960 (Note: This includes 64 write-in votes, which were not attributed to a specific location) | | |

==== By congressional district ====
Parker won all six congressional districts, even while the 4th district elected a Republican U.S. Representative.

| District | Henry E. Parker Democratic | | Margaret B. Melady Republican | | Total votes cast | Representative |
| District | # | % | # | % | Total votes cast | Representative |
|---|---|---|---|---|---|---|
| 1st | 101,154 | 60.90% | 64,936 | 39.10% | 166,090 | William R. Cotter |
| 2nd | 97,861 | 60.74% | 63,262 | 39.26% | 161,123 | Chris Dodd |
| 3rd | 96,090 | 59.37% | 65,753 | 40.63% | 161,843 | Robert Giaimo |
| 4th | 72,859 | 52.42% | 66,142 | 47.58% | 139,001 | Stewart McKinney |
| 5th | 95,633 | 52.99% | 84,834 | 47.01% | 180,467 | Ronald A. Sarasin (95th Congress) |
| 5th | 95,633 | 52.99% | 84,834 | 47.01% | 180,467 | William R. Ratchford (96th Congress) |
| 6th | 102,932 | 57.38% | 76,440 | 42.62% | 179,372 | Toby Moffett |
| Totals | 566,529 | 57.34% | 421,367 | 42.65% | 987,960 | |
