= Anti-Irish sentiment =

Hostility or prejudice towards Irish people

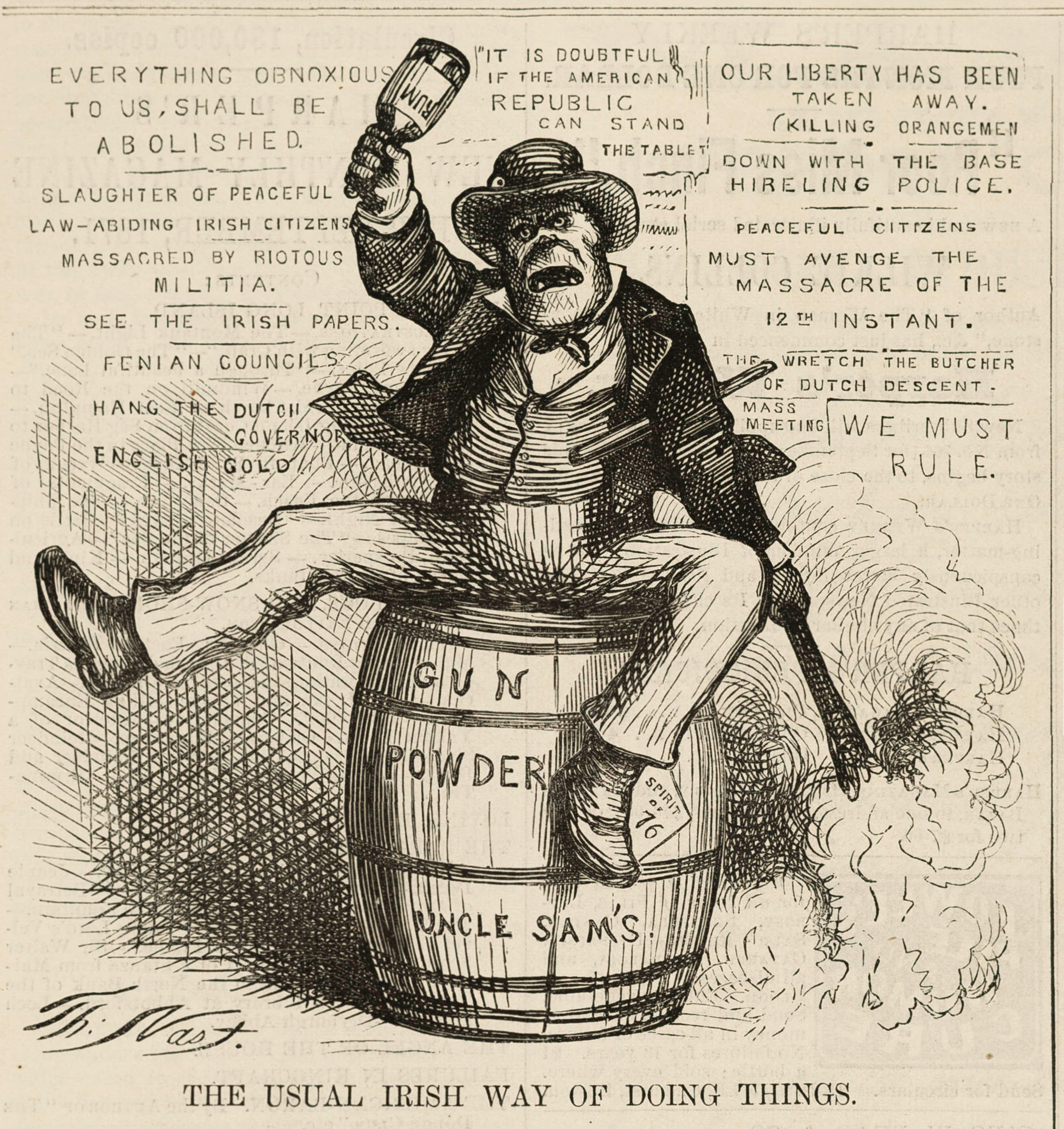
American political cartoon by Thomas Nast titled "The Usual Irish Way of Doing Things", depicting a drunken and stereotyped Irishman sitting on a barrel of gunpowder while lighting a powder keg and swinging a bottle in the air. Nast was an anti-Catholic immigrant from Germany. Published 2 September 1871 in Harper's Weekly.

Anti-Irish sentiment, also known as Hibernophobia, (Note: From Hiberno- ("of Hibernia", the Classical Latin name for Ireland) + -phobia ("fear").) is bigotry against the Irish people or individuals. It can include hatred, oppression, persecution, as well as simple discrimination. Generally, it could be bigotry against people from the island of Ireland, the Republic of Ireland or Northern Ireland. Specifically, it could be directed against Irish immigrants, or their descendants, throughout the world, who are known as the Irish diaspora.

Anti-Irish sentiment has occurred from the early modern period up until current day. The British colonisation of Ireland heavily contributed to the public perspective of the Irish. Other instances were also recorded during Irish immigration to Great Britain, North America, Australia and New Zealand. Anti-Irish sentiment can include internal conflict dealing with social, ethnic and cultural discrimination within Ireland itself. Sectarianism and cultural, religious or political conflicts are referred to as the Troubles in Northern Ireland.

Hostility increased towards the Irish over the centuries, as they steadfastly remained Roman Catholic despite the fact that Edward VI and subsequent rulers used coercion to convert them to Protestantism. Penal laws were created to marginalize the Catholic population and convert them to Protestantism by taking away vital parts of everyday life such as owning land, voting, and education. The religious majority of the Irish nation was ruled by a religious minority, leading to perennial social conflict. During the Great Famine in the middle of the 19th century, some evangelical Protestants sought to convert the starving Catholics as part of their relief efforts. British colonisation of Ireland led to many discriminatory laws being passed against Catholics and the Irish population. These laws led to uprisings and wars between the Irish and British, leading to damaged relationships between the two. Although the Catholic population was persecuted to a great extent, Catholicism still remains the religion of the majority of the inhabitants of Ireland.

Negative attitudes towards the Irish was fostered through political propaganda and the views of the people that lived in the places the Irish immigrated to. The struggle to escape British power through wars and uprisings worsened anti-Irish sentiment in English individuals. The Irish were not widely accepted in the places they migrated to and often struggled to find work. The result of World War II deepened tension towards the Irish. Northern Ireland, which is a part of the UK, tends to be more Protestant but with a growing Catholic population. Discrimination in Northern Ireland is mostly a results from disputes between Protestant and Catholic faith.

Modern day anti-Irish sentiment no longer lies in immigration or religious tension, but rather notable individuals who discriminate against the Irish due to bad personal experiences. The Great Famine is often used against the Irish and remind them of their past. Ethnic stereotypes continue to be a source of negative sentiment towards the Irish.

== Politics ==
Politics often diminished the value of the Irish people. A British political cartoon called "Wild Beast" displayed the Irish as inferior wild animals that have no self control. The immigrant Irish population in the United States integrated themselves into American politics to climb the socioeconomic ladder, but in the process faced discrimination from the native population.

== History ==
=== Middle Ages ===
The Middle Ages relates to the early modern period, which starts in 1500. The majority of anti-Irish sentiment in the Pre-modern era is due to English colonisation within Ireland. Negative English attitudes towards the Gaelic Irish and their culture date as far back as the reign of Henry II of England. In 1155, Pope Adrian IV (himself an Englishman) issued the papal bull called Laudabiliter, that gave Henry permission to conquer Ireland as a means of strengthening the Papacy's control over the Irish Church, although the very existence of the bull is disputed by modern historians. Pope Adrian called the Irish a "rude and barbarous" nation. The Norman invasion of Ireland began in 1169 with the backing of Pope Alexander III, who was Pope at the time of the invasion and ratified the Laudabiliter, giving Henry dominion over Ireland. He likewise called the Irish a "barbarous nation" with "filthy practices".

Gerald of Wales visited Ireland in 1183 and again in 1185 when he accompanied King Henry's son, John, on his expedition to Ireland. As a result of this he wrote the Topographia Hibernica ("Topography of Ireland") and the Expugnatio Hibernica ("Conquest of Ireland"), both of which remained in circulation for centuries afterwards. Ireland, in his view, was rich; but the Irish were backward and lazy:

They use their fields mostly for pasture. Little is cultivated and even less is sown. The problem here is not the quality of the soil but rather the lack of industry on the part of those who should cultivate it. This laziness means that the different types of minerals with which hidden veins of the earth are full are neither mined nor exploited in any way. They do not devote themselves to the manufacture of flax or wool, nor to the practice of any mechanical or mercantile act. Dedicated only to leisure and laziness, this is a truly barbarous people. They depend on animals for their livelihood and they live like animals.

Gerald's views were not atypical, and similar views may be found in the writings of William of Malmesbury and William of Newburgh. When it comes to Irish marital and sexual customs Gerald is even more biting: "This is a filthy people, wallowing in vice. They indulge in incest, for example in marrying – or rather debauching – the wives of their dead brothers". Even earlier than this Archbishop Anselm accused the Irish of wife swapping, "exchanging their wives as freely as other men exchange their horses".

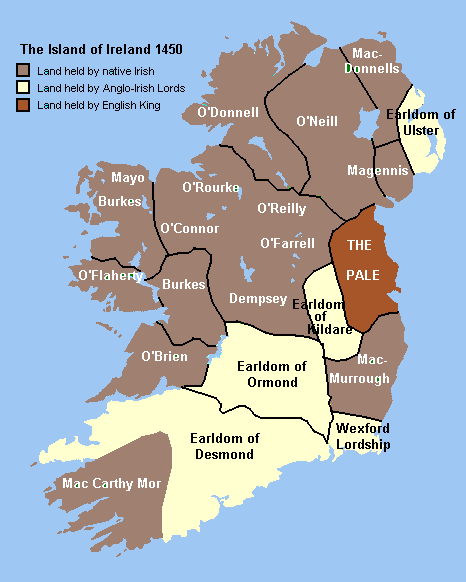
Ireland in 1450. The Statutes of Kilkenny decreed that intermarriage between English settlers and Irish natives was forbidden. It also forbade the settlers from using the Irish language and adopting Irish modes of dress or other customs.

One will find these views echoed centuries later in the words of Sir Henry Sidney, twice Lord Deputy of Ireland during the reign of Queen Elizabeth I, and in those of Edmund Tremayne, his secretary. In Tremayne's view the Irish "commit whoredom, hold no wedlock, ravish, steal and commit all abomination without scruple of conscience". In A View of the Present State of Ireland, circulated in 1596 but not published until 1633, the English official and renowned poet Edmund Spenser wrote "They are all papists by profession but in the same so blindingly and brutishly informed that you would rather think them atheists or infidels". In a "Brief Note on Ireland", Spenser argued that "Great force must be the instrument but famine must be the means, for till Ireland be famished it cannot be subdued ... There can be no conformity of government where is no conformity of religion ... There can be no sound agreement between two equal contraries viz: the English and Irish".

Anti-Irish sentiments played a role in atrocities which were perpetrated against the Irish. For instance, in 1305, Piers Bermingham received a financial bonus and accolades in verse after beheading thirty members of the O'Conor clan and sending them to Dublin. In 1317, one Irish chronicler opined that it was just as easy for an Englishman to kill an Irishman or English woman to kill an Irish woman as he would a dog. The Irish were thought of as the most barbarous people in Europe, and such ideas were modified to compare the Scottish Highlands or Gàidhealtachd where traditionally Scottish Gaelic is spoken to medieval Ireland.

To prevent the English from integrating into Irish society, the Parliament passed the Statutes of Kilkenny in 1366. These acts forbade the speaking of the Irish language among English settlers and any Irish living with them. They also prevented marriages between English and Irish and segregated the churches. These were limited in area to the Pale and enforcement is debated. The first diligent attempt to phase out the Irish language and culture across the island came from Henry VIII in 1537. The 'Act for English Order, Habit and Language' required the Irish parishes to contain an English grammar school and required everyone to do their best to speak English and teach their children English language. The schools were not fully implemented till the National Schools in 1833. The act stated that the Irish possess "a certain savage and wild kind and manner of living" which it sought to remove.

=== Early modern period ===
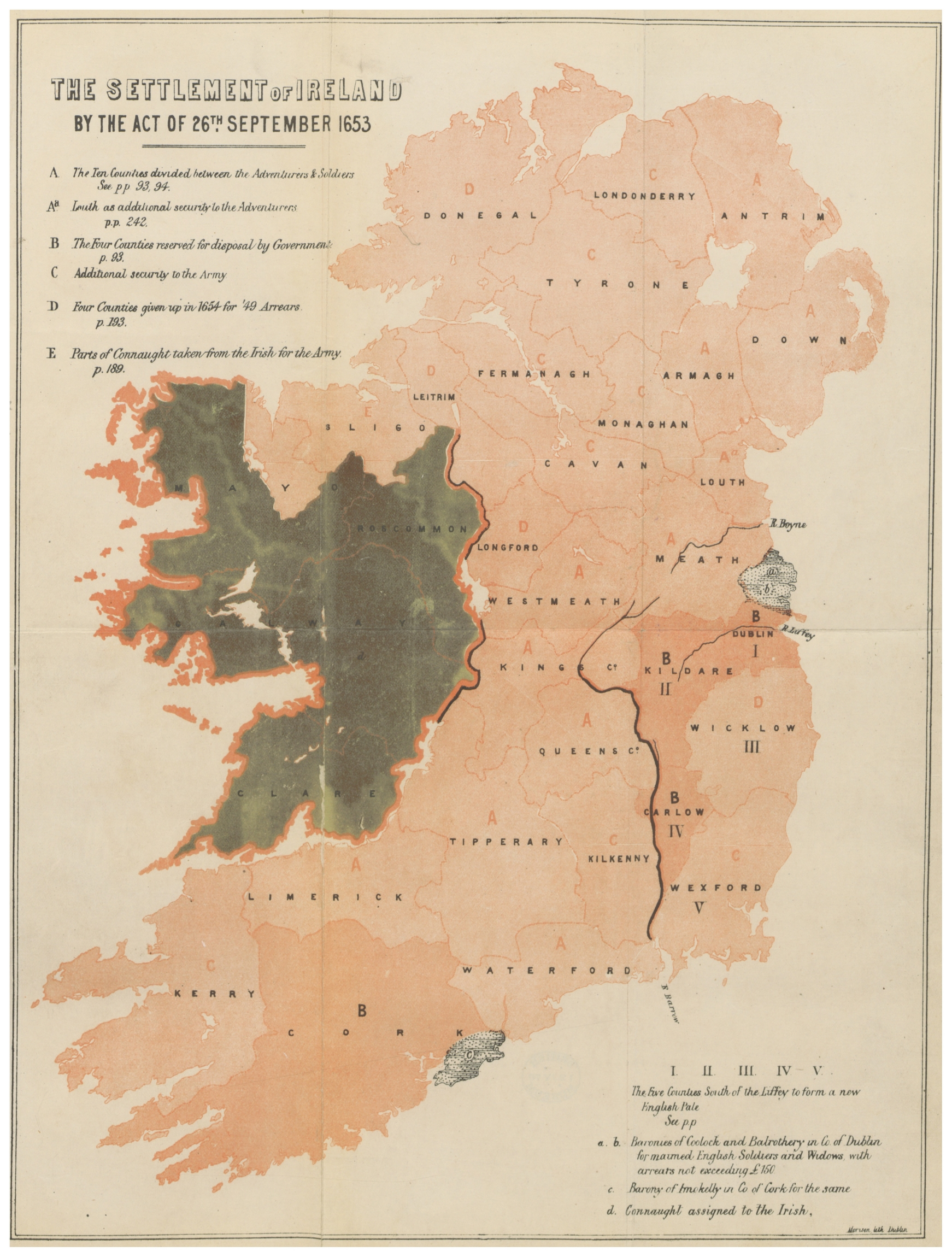
After the Cromwellian conquest of Ireland, huge areas of land were confiscated and the Irish Catholics were banished to the lands of Connacht.

The early modern period refers to time period of 1500-1800. Religious tension and British colonisation was the predominant cause of anti-Irish sentiment during the early modern period. In the early modern period which followed the advent of Protestantism in Great Britain, Irish Catholics were subjected to social and political discrimination because they refused to renounce Catholicism. Irish Catholics lost many rights concerning land, inheritance, voting, and they lost more rights under the penal laws. This discrimination sometimes manifested itself in areas with large Puritan or Presbyterian populations such as the northeastern parts of Ireland, the Central Belt of Scotland, and parts of Canada. Thinly veiled nationalism under the guise of religious conflict has occurred in both the UK and Ireland.

In 1649, under Oliver Cromwell's control of the British Parliament, Cromwell organised the Siege of Drogheda in Ireland. The Siege of Drogheda brought thousands of innocent casualties to soldiers and civilians in Ireland. Cromwell gained inspiration for the conquest of Ireland through encouragement for British conquest, the spread of Protestantism, and plain animosity towards the Irish.

The Act for the Settlement of Ireland 1652 barred Irish Catholics from most public offices and confiscated large amounts of their land, much of which was given to Protestant settlers.

Anti-Irish sentiment is found in works by several 18th-century writers such as the French philosopher Voltaire, who depicted the Catholic Irish as savage and backward, and defended British rule in the country.

=== 19th century ===
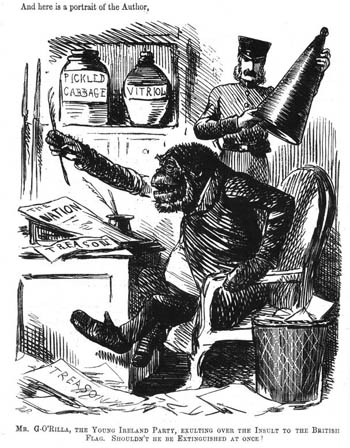
An Irishman depicted as a gorilla ("Mr. G. O'Rilla")

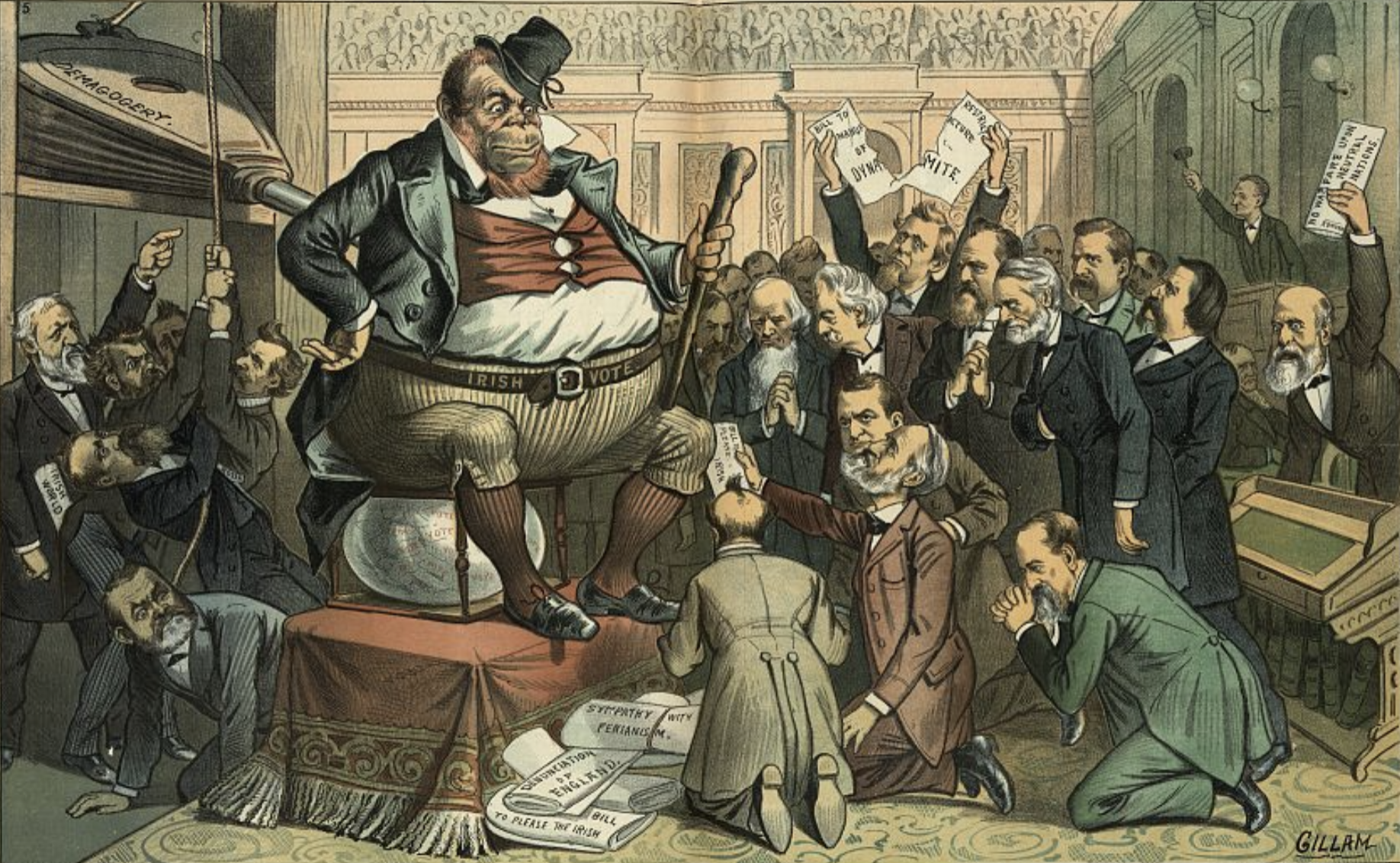
An Irishman depicted as an orangutan, in Congress

Anti-Irish sentiment in the 19th century heavily involved negative images of the Irish due to political propaganda and immigration due to the poor economic state of Ireland. The immigration of the Irish to various places such as America and Europe brought mixed emotions amongst the native residents. Anti-Irish sentiments in Victorian Britain and 19th century United States manifested themselves the stereotyping of the Irish as violent and alcoholic. The Irish were consistently depicted as everything but civilised. Magazines such as Punch portrayed the Irish as having "bestial, ape-like or demonic features and the Irishman, (especially the political radical) was invariably given a long or prognathous jaw, the stigmata to the phrenologists of a lower evolutionary order, degeneracy, or criminality."

From the British perspective, the Irish were ranked lowly amongst other Europeans, but still above Black people. Throughout the Early Modern period many British have wrote on their opinion on the Irish. Charles Kingsley wrote:

I am haunted by the human chimpanzees I saw in Ireland. .. to see white chimpanzees is dreadful; if they were black, one would not feel it so much

The Acts of Union 1800 signified the end of the Irish Parliament due to integration of the Kingdom of Great Britain. Many Irish were against this change, believing it would erase some of their history. Britain proposed that the unification of government would protect from French invasion. Ultimately, the act strengthened British control over Ireland. After the conclusion of the Napoleonic Wars, a fall in agricultural prices occurred. During the ensuing depression, farmers in southern England were unable to pay their agricultural workers a sustainable wage. There was an excess of labour compounded by the men returning from the wars. In 1829 added to this mix, was an unprecedented influx of migrant Irish workers who were prepared to work for half what their English counterparts were earning. On the Isle of Thanet the local farm labourers rounded up the Irish workers. William Cobbett wrote:

Instantly the English labourers received notice that they must work at the same price as the Irish... They armed themselves with what they called BATS; (Note: The word "bat" in the dialect of Kent is used for any piece of wood of about 4 feet (1.2 m) or 5 feet (1.5 m) in length and not too wide in diameter to hold in the hand and able to be wielded about.) they went to the several barns, where the poor Irish fellows were snoozled in among the litter and rubbish, roused them up, and told them, that they must march out of the island.

Irish labourers were singled out in particular for rough treatment by the locals. Farms employing Irish labour were subject to violent threats and incendiarism. There were similar problems in 1830, however eventually the farmers became the target for attacks, rather than the Irish, in the disturbances that became known as the Swing Riots.

Similar to other immigrant populations, they were sometimes accused of cronyism and subjected to misrepresentations of their religious and cultural beliefs. Irish Catholics were particularly singled out for attack by Protestants. Anti-Catholicism, whether real or imagined, played to the Catholic respect for martyrdom, and was partly based on a fear of a reborn Inquisition whose methods clashed with the "Age of Enlightenment". Irish Catholics were not involved in formulating church dogma, but it became a stick to beat them with. Mostly they stayed with their church as it fostered a sense of community in an otherwise harsh commercial world.

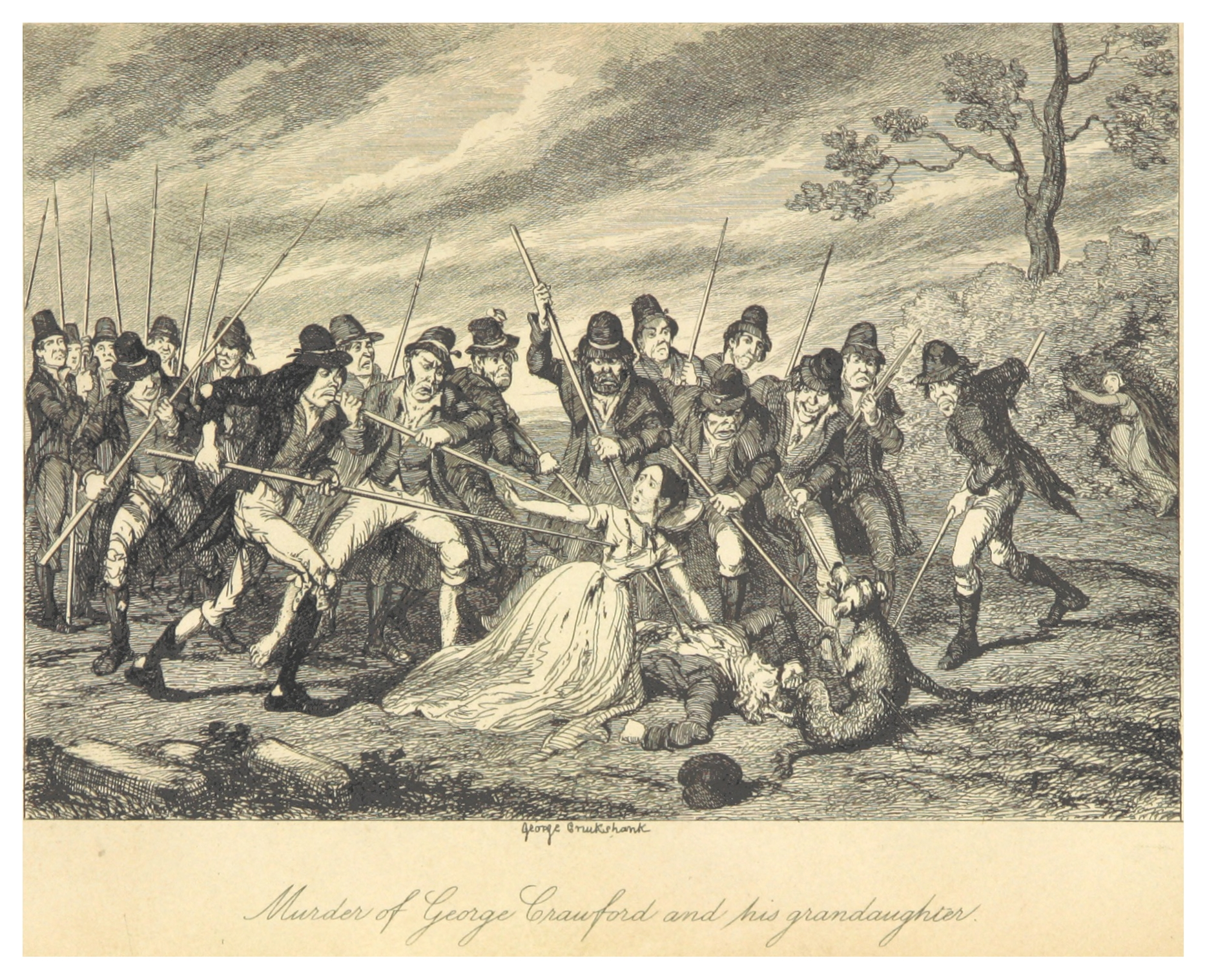
English atrocity propaganda depicting the behaviour of Irish Catholics during the Irish Rebellion of 1798, by George Cruikshank (1845).

In Liverpool, England, where many Irish immigrants settled following the Great Famine, anti-Irish prejudice was widespread. The sheer numbers of people coming across the Irish sea and settling in the poorer districts of the city led to physical attacks and it became common practice for those with Irish accents or even Irish names to be barred from jobs, public houses and employment opportunities.

In 1836, young Benjamin Disraeli wrote:

[The Irish] hate our order, our civilization, our enterprising industry, our pure religion. This wild, reckless, indolent, uncertain and superstitious race have no sympathy with the English character. Their ideal of human felicity is an alternation of clannish broils and coarse idolatry. Their history describes an unbroken circle of bigotry and blood.

In 1882, five people were murdered in the Maamtrasna, on the border between County Mayo and County Galway in Ireland. Covering the incident, The Spectator wrote the following:

The Tragedy at Maamtrasna, investigated this week in Dublin, almost unique as it is in the annals of the United Kingdom, brings out in strong relief two facts which Englishmen are too apt to forget. One is the existence in particular districts of Ireland of a class of peasants who are scarcely civilised beings, and approach far nearer to savages than any other white men; and the other is their extraordinary and exceptional gloominess of temper. In remote places of Ireland, especially in Connaught, on a few of the islands, and in one or two mountain districts, dwell cultivators who are in knowledge, in habits, and in the discipline of life no higher than Maories or other Polynesians.

— The Tragedy at Maamtrasna, The Spectator

During the 1700s and 1800s, many states in the United States allowed male non-citizens to vote. Anti-Irish Catholic sentiment following the War of 1812 and intensifying again in the 1840s lead many states, particularly in the Northeast, to amend their constitutions to prohibit non-citizens from voting. States that banned non-citizen voting during this time included New Hampshire in 1814, Virginia in 1818, Connecticut in 1819, New Jersey in 1820, Massachusetts in 1822, Vermont in 1828, Pennsylvania in 1838, Delaware in 1831, Tennessee in 1834, Rhode Island in 1842, Illinois in 1848, Ohio and Maryland in 1851, and North Carolina in 1856.

In the Know Nothing Platform, an 1855 anonymous anti-Catholic book, the self-described Know Nothing author argued for restricting the political rights of Irish immigrants. The document compared the United States to a business, asserting that just as a firm would not admit someone “totally ignorant of its principles,” immigrants should not be entrusted with voting or governance:

And is it to be supposed that an ignorant, bog-trotting Irishman, who after years of instruction, can scarcely be taught to shoe a horse—the moment he is imported from Ireland, under the auspices of Archbishop Hughes, to be put up for sale, to the highest bid of profligate politicians—is competent to understand and control, for the good of the community, our complicated system of government and policy?

Henry Winter Davis, an active Know-Nothing, was elected on the new "American Party" ticket to Congress from Maryland. He told Congress that the un-American Irish Catholic immigrants were to blame for the recent election of Democrat James Buchanan as president, stating:

The recent election has developed in an aggravated form every evil against which the American party protested. Foreign allies have decided the government of the country – men naturalized in thousands on the eve of the election. Again in the fierce struggle for supremacy, men have forgotten the ban which the Republic puts on the intrusion of religious influence on the political arena. These influences have brought vast multitudes of foreign-born citizens to the polls, ignorant of American interests, without American feelings, influenced by foreign sympathies, to vote on American affairs; and those votes have, in point of fact, accomplished the present result.

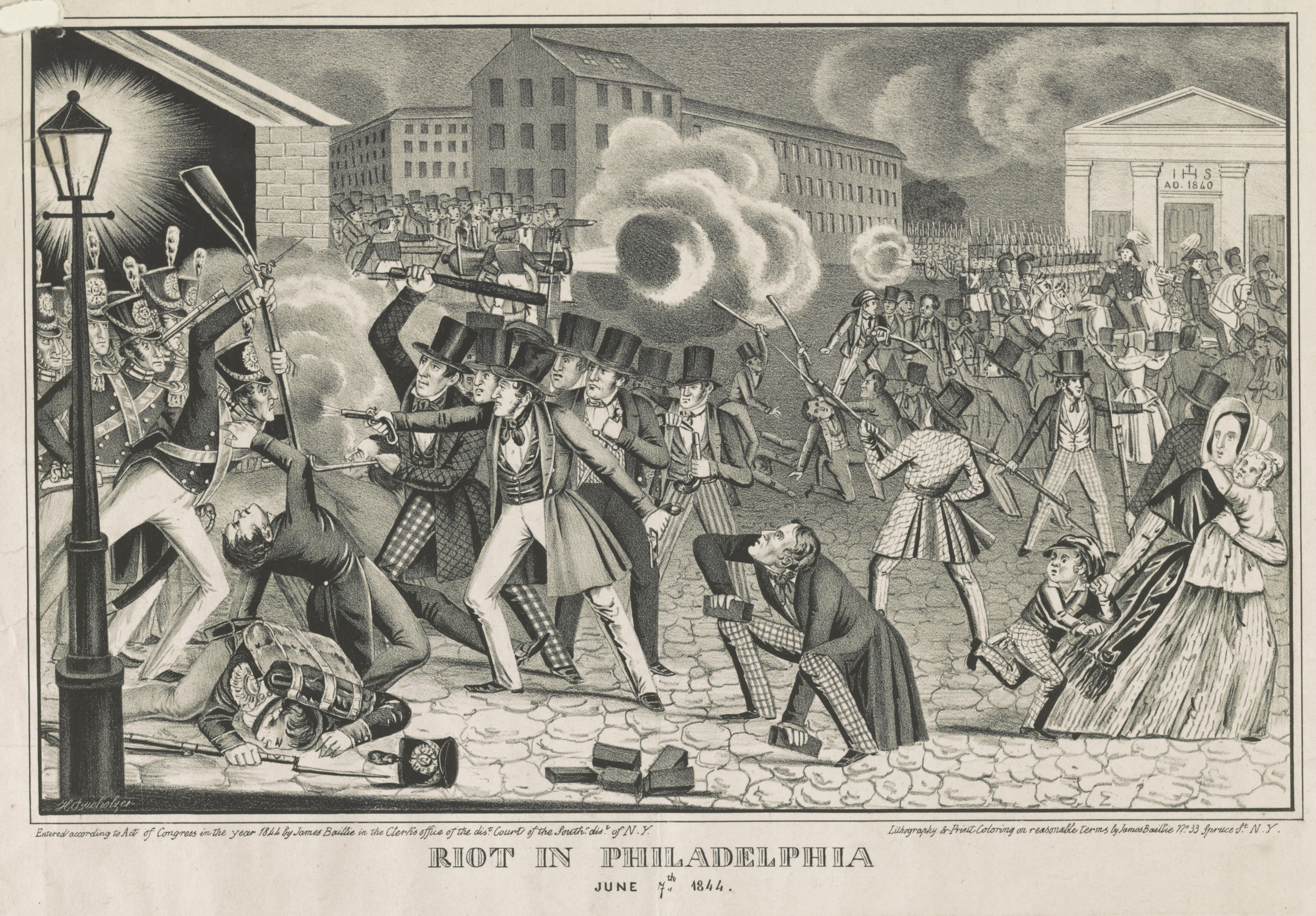
Philadelphia nativist riots in July 1844

Much of the opposition came from Irish Protestants, as in the 1831 riots in Philadelphia, Pennsylvania.

Protestants of the nineteenth century would use crime statistics to allege that Irish Catholics were over-represented in crime. There were theories that the over-representation was due to a lack of morality stemming from Catholic religious belief, and other theories that Catholics were racially inferior to Anglo-Saxons. A. B. Forwood (1893) of the Liverpool Conservative Party stated,

The influx of the Irish into Liverpool brought poverty, disease, dirt and misery; drunkenness and crime, in addition to a disturbance of the labour market, the cost to ratepayers of an enormous sum of money.

During the 1830s in rural areas of the U.S., riots for control of job sites broke out among rival labour teams which were from different parts of Ireland, as well as riots between Irish and local American work teams which competed for construction jobs.

Irish Catholics were isolated and marginalized by Protestant society, but the Irish gained control of the Catholic Church from English, French and Germans. Intermarriage between Catholics and Protestants was strongly discouraged by both Protestant ministers and Catholic priests. Catholics, led by the Irish, built a network of parochial schools and colleges, as well as orphanages and hospitals, typically using nuns as an inexpensive work force. They thereby avoided public institutions mostly controlled by Protestants.

The Irish used their base in Tammany Hall (the Democratic Party machine in New York City) to play a role in the New York State legislature. Young Theodore Roosevelt was their chief Republican opponent, and he wrote in his diary that:

There are some twenty five Irish Democrats in the house. ... They are a stupid, sodden and vicious lot, most of them being equally deficient in brains and virtue. Three or four however ... seem to be pretty good men, and among the best members of the house are two Republican farmers named O'Neil and Sheehy, the grandsons of Irish immigrants. But the average catholic Irishman of first-generation as represented in this Assembly, is a low, venal, corrupt and unintelligent brute.

==== "No Irish need apply" ====
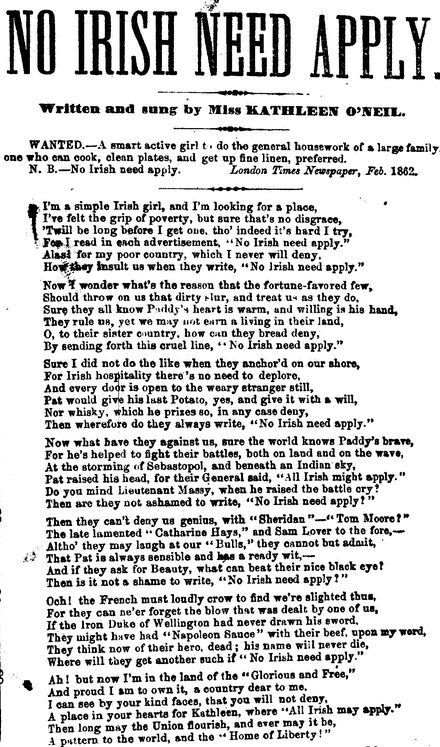
London version of "No Irish Need Apply", February 1862

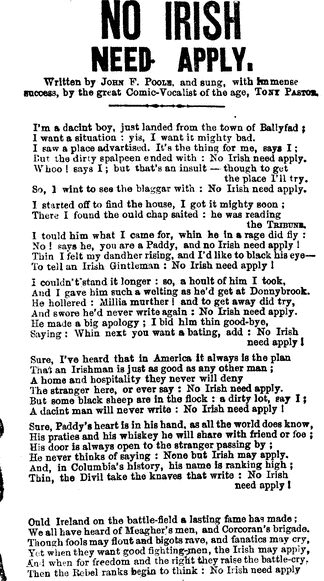
1862 song that used the "No Irish Need Apply" slogan. It was copied from a similar London song.

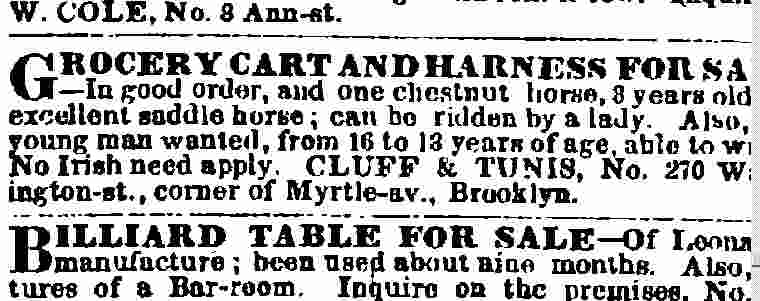
Example of "No Irish need apply" ads by a business for male workers found in The New York Times, 1854.

After 1860, many Irish sang songs about signs and notices reading "Help wanted – no Irish need apply" or similar. The 1862 protest song "No Irish Need Apply", written and performed by Mrs F. R. Phillips, was inspired by such signs in London. Later Irish Americans adapted the lyrics and the songs to reflect the discrimination they felt in America.

Historians have debated about the issue of anti-Irish job discrimination in the United States. Some of them believe that the "No Irish need apply" (or "NINA") signs were common, but others, such as Richard J. Jensen, believe that anti-Irish job discrimination was not a significant factor in the United States, and they also believe that these signs and print advertisements were posted by the limited number of early 19th-century English immigrants to the United States who believed in the same prejudices that the people of their former homeland believed in. In July 2015 the same journal that published Jensen's 2002 paper published a rebuttal by Rebecca A. Fried, an 8th-grade student at Sidwell Friends School. She listed multiple instances of the restriction used in advertisements for many different types of positions, including "clerks at stores and hotels, bartenders, farm workers, house painters, hog butchers, coachmen, bookkeepers, blackers [tannery workers who blackened leather], workers at lumber yards, upholsterers, bakers, gilders, tailors, and papier mache workers, among others." While the greatest number of NINA instances occurred in the 1840s, Fried found instances for its continued use throughout the subsequent century, with the most recent dating to 1909 in Butte, Montana.

Alongside "No Irish Need Apply" signs, in the post-World War II years, signs which read "No Irish, No Blacks, No Dogs" or similar signs reportedly appeared in the United Kingdom.

=== 20th century ===
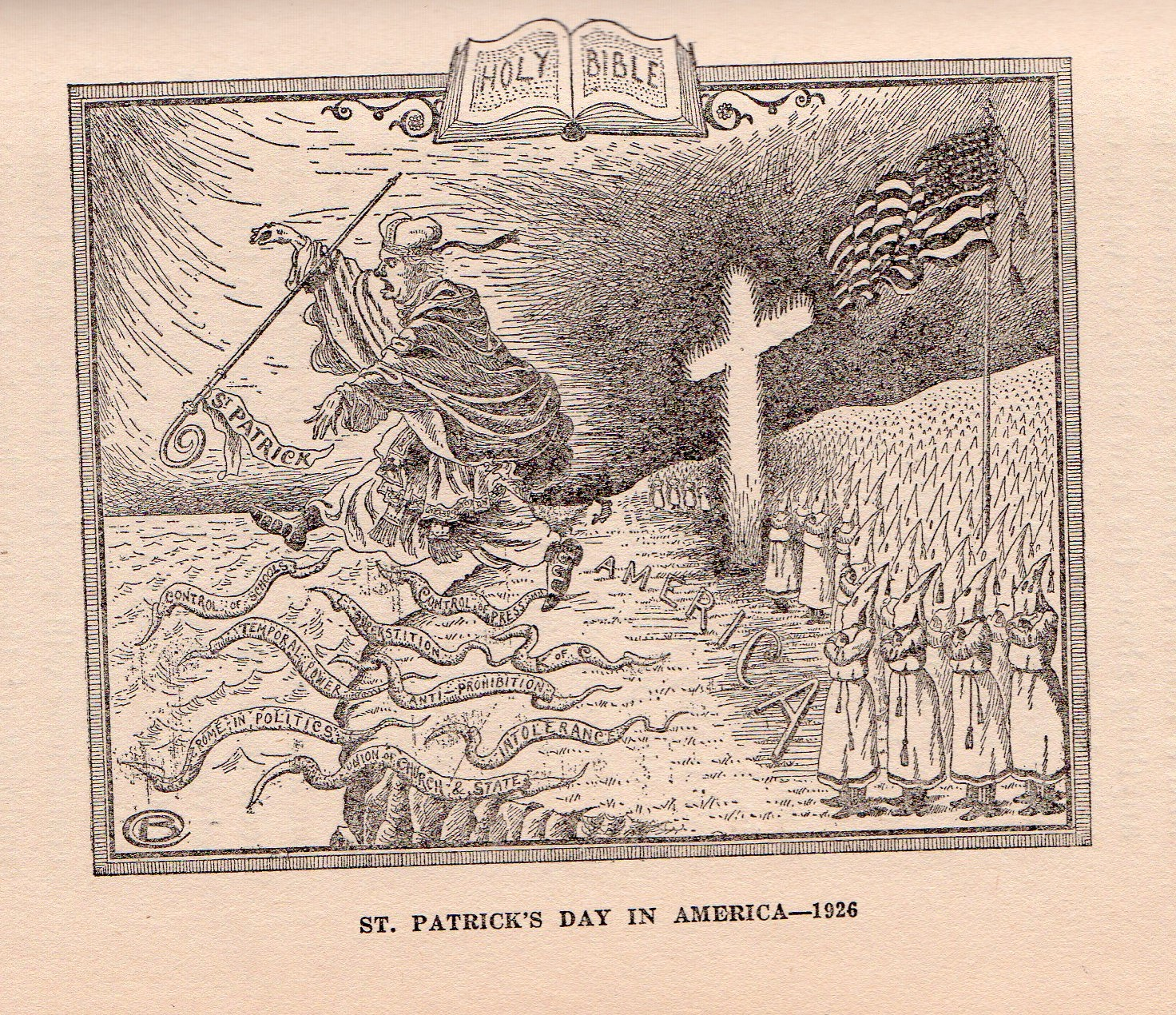
Ku Klux Klan cartoon (1926) depicting Saint Patrick being driven out of America, along with snakes marked "Rome in Politics", "Knights of Columbus", "superstition" and other evils wrongly associated with Irish Americans.

Rebellion against British control, immigration due to the Great Famine, and the continuation of religious tension contributed to anti-Irish sentiment in the 20th century. In July 1905, the British Parliament attempted to introduce the Drunkenness (Ireland) Bill which aimed to provide financial protection to the spouses of "habitual drunkards" and set penalties for adults who were found to be drunk while caring for children. The Irish Nationalist MP for South Louth, Joseph Nolan, said that the "very title 'Drunkenness (Ireland) Bill' was offensive" and that he "resented any special measure of this kind being brought forward to deal with drunkenness in Ireland which was not applicable to Great Britain as well."

In 1916, Irish rebellion against British control led to the Easter Rising. The Easter Rising increased tension between the Irish and British. After the rebellion, the British executed 16 leaders of Easter Rising. This rebellion eventually led to the Irish War of Independence.

The Irish civil war (June 28th, 1922 - May 24th, 1923) was fought to become free from British colonization. This resistance created a negative view of the Irish, especially for those in support of the British. The Irish civil war also created an image of violence and chaos to the rest of the world.

The American writer H. P. Lovecraft held very anti-Irish views. In 1921, concerning the possibility of an independent Irish state, he said the following: "If the Irish had the 'right' to independence they would possess it. If they ever gain it, they will possess it – until they lose it again. England has the right to rule because she does ... It is not chance, but racial superiority, which has made the Briton supreme. Why have not the Irish conquered and colonized the earth if they be so deserving of regard? They are brainless canaille."

In 1923, the General Assembly of the Church of Scotland approved a report entitled The Menace of the Irish race to our Scottish Nationality, which called for "means to be found to preserve Scotland and the Scottish race and to secure in future generations the traditions, ideals and faith of a great people, unspoiled and inviolate."

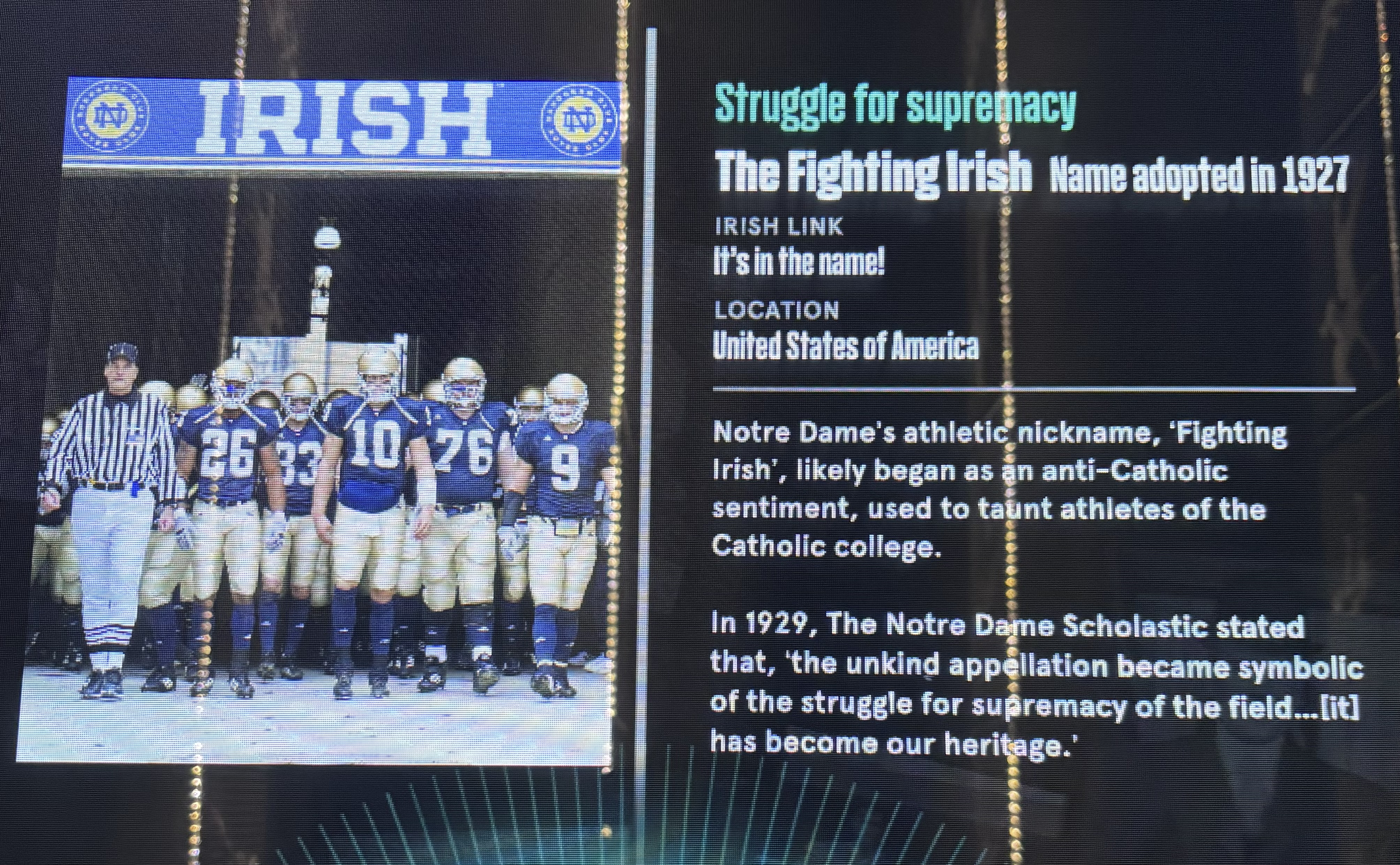
An exhibit in the Epic museum in Ireland that describes the origin of the "Fighting Irish" nickname for the University of Notre Dame.

In 1927, the University of Notre Dame adapted the nickname "The Fighting Irish". The name originated from Anti-Catholic sentiment that many Irish at the university faced. Ties to the Irish Brigade through Father William Corby also contribute to the adoption of the name through Irish connection.

In 1934, the writer J. B. Priestley published the travelogue English Journey, in which he wrote "A great many speeches have been made and books written on the subject of what England has done to Ireland ... I should be interested to hear a speech and read a book or two on the subject of what Ireland has done to England ... if we do have an Irish Republic as our neighbour, and it is found possible to return her exiled citizens, what a grand clearance there will be in all the western ports, from the Clyde to Cardiff, what a fine exit of ignorance and dirt and drunkenness and disease."

In 1937, ten young men and boys, aged from 13 to 23, burned to death in a fire on a farm in Kirkintilloch, Scotland. All were seasonal workers from Achill Sound in County Mayo, Ireland. The Vanguard, the official newspaper of the Scottish Protestant League, referred to the event in the following text:

The Scandal of Kirkintilloch is not that some Irishmen have lost their lives in a fire; it is that Irish Papists brought up in disloyalty and superstition are engaged in jobs which should belong by right to Scottish Protestants.

The Kirkintilloch sensation again reminds the People of Scotland that Rome's Irish Scum still over-run our land.

=== Northern Ireland ===
Since the formation of Northern Ireland in 1921, there have been tensions between Protestants, who tend to refer to themselves as British, and Catholics, who tend to refer to themselves as Irish.

In 1988, John Taylor, the Ulster Unionist MP for Strangford, replied to a letter from Gearoid Ó Muilleoir, deputy president of the Student's Union in Queen's University Belfast, relating to grants for students in Northern Ireland. Taylor's letter said, "Since your surname is clearly unpronounceable I have, rightly or wrongly, concluded that you are Irish and not British. I therefore suggest that you, and those whom you represent, apply for any necessary grants to the Dublin Government."

Taylor later repudiated being Irish in a debate in Dublin: "We in Northern Ireland are not Irish. We do not jig at crossroads, speak Gaelic, play GAA etc. ... It is an insult for Dubliners to refer to us as being Irish."

The Provisional IRA's bombings in England led to fear, anti-Irish sentiment and attacks on the Irish community there. After the Birmingham pub bombings, for example, there were reports of isolated attacks on Irish people and Irish-owned businesses in the Australian press. In the 1990s, writers for the Daily Mail newspaper "called for Irish people to be banned from UK sporting events and fined for IRA disruption to public transport", one of numerous opinions expressed over many years which has led the Daily Mail to be accused by some in Ireland of publishing "some of the most virulently anti-Irish journalism in Britain for decades".

=== 21st century ===
Anti-Irish sentiment in the 21st century has been fuelled by individuals who use hate speech as a way to demean the Irish population. Anti-Irish sentiment due to religious tension and British control has significantly declined. In 2002, English journalist Julie Burchill narrowly escaped prosecution for incitement to racial hatred, following a column in The Guardian where she described Ireland as being synonymous with "child molestation, Nazi-sympathising, and the oppression of women". She had expressed anti-Irish sentiment several times throughout her career, announcing in the London journal Time Out, "I hate the Irish, I think they're appalling."

In March 2012, a classified ad in Perth, Australia placed by a bricklayer stated that "no Irish" should apply for the job.

In July 2012, The Irish Times published a report on anti-Irish prejudice in Britain. It claimed that far-right British nationalist groups continued to use "anti-IRA" marches as "an excuse to attack and intimidate Irish immigrants". Shortly before the 2012 Summer Olympics, former British athlete Daley Thompson was shown an image of a runner with a misspelt tattoo and said that the person responsible for the misspelling "must have been Irish". The BBC issued an apology.

On 8 August 2012, an article appeared in Australian newspapers titled "Punch Drunk: Ireland intoxicated as Taylor swings towards boxing gold". The article, written by Peter Hanlon, claimed that Katie Taylor was not "what you'd expect in a fighting Irishwoman, nor is she surrounded by people who'd prefer a punch to a potato". The journalist who wrote it apologised for "indulging racial stereotypes". The following day, Australian commentator Russell Barwick asserted that athletes from Ireland should compete for the British Olympic team, likening it to a surfer from Hawaii "not surfing for the USA". When fellow presenter Mark Chapman explained that the Republic of Ireland was an independent state, Barwick remarked, "It's nothing but an Irish joke."

Since at least 2012, Greg Hodge, managing director of the dating website BeautifulPeople.com, has expressed anti-Irish sentiment on numerous occasions. In 2020, he said, "There are many examples of very handsome Irish men in Hollywood. However this is the exception and not the norm. Irish men are the undisputed ugliest in the world. They really are in a league of their own." His comments are often mocked.

On 25 June 2013, an Irish flag was burned at an Orange Order headquarters in the Everton area of Liverpool. This was seen by members of Liverpool's Irish community, which is the biggest in the UK, as a hate crime.

In December 2014, British broadcaster Channel 4 caused an "outrage" and "fury" in Ireland and the UK when it planned a comedy series about the Irish Famine. The sitcom named Hungry, was announced by writer Hugh Travers, who said "we're kind of thinking of it as Shameless in famine Ireland." The response in Ireland was quick and negative: "Jewish people would never endorse making a comedy of the mass extermination of their ancestors at the hands of the Nazis, Cambodians would never support people laughing at what happened to their people at the hands of the Khmer Rouge and the people of Somalia, Ethiopia or Sudan would never accept the plight of their people, through generational famine, being the source of humour in Britain", Dublin councillor David McGuinness said. "I am not surprised that it is a British television outlet funding this venture." The writer defended the concept saying, "Comedy equals tragedy plus time." Channel 4 issued a press release stating that "This in the development process and is not currently planned to air ... It's not unusual for sitcoms to exist against backdrops that are full of adversity and hardship". Protesters from the Irish community planned to picket the offices of Channel 4 and campaigners called the proposed show "institutionalised anti-Irish racism".

In January 2019, American rapper Azealia Banks made disparaging comments on Instagram about Irish people after getting into an argument with a flight attendant on an Aer Lingus flight to Dublin. She called Irish people "a bunch of prideful inbred leprechauns" and "barbarians". The following day, she said she would dedicate her Dublin show to "beautiful Irish women". However, following the show, Banks again attacked the Irish online and mocked the Irish Famine.

In March 2019, host Sara Haines of ABC TV's Strahan & Sara Show described St. Patrick's day as "an Irish Holiday that celebrates drinking and public urination".

In July 2019, the East Ham constituency Labour branch was criticised for its election of a White Irish woman as the women's officer for its Black, Asian and Minority Ethnic (BAME) forum. The woman in question self-identified as being an ethnic minority and no objections within the branch were raised against her election. Branch secretary, Syed Taqi Shah commented that "if somebody self-declares [as BAME], and the Labour Party allows them to do so, they should be respected."

In March 2021, the Equality and Human Rights Commission said it had investigated British holiday park operator Pontins after a whistleblower revealed that Pontins maintained a blacklist of common Irish surnames to prevent Irish Travellers from entering its parks.

On 28 November 2023, Lazio supporters unfurled anti-Irish banners before and during a Champions League match with Celtic F.C. which read: "The famine is over go home fucking potato eaters" and "Did the Fenian bastards take [sic] shower today?".

In 2024, US political advisor Matthew RJ Brodsky wrote that Israel should “carpet bomb the Irish area” where UNIFIL peacekeepers were deployed in Lebanon, and then “drop napalm over it”. This was in response to an X post claiming that Irish Defence Force troops had refused to follow evacuation orders from Israel in southern Lebanon. Brodsky subsequently stood down as an advisor to Dalia Al-Aqidi, a Republican candidate in the 2024 election to Minnesota's 5th congressional district. Taoiseach Simon Harris described Brodsky’s remarks as “entirely inappropriate” and “despicable”.

Beginning in December 2024, some Israeli media outlets began using the terms “Paddystine” to refer to Ireland and “Paddystinians” to refer to Irish people, in reference to support for Palestine expressed by many Irish activists and groups. The terms were subsequently adopted by some pro-Palestinian activists in Ireland, who used them in a positive or self-referential context.

In January 2026, a commercial board game from Compass Games, The Great Hunger, was criticized by the Irish public for the "insensitive" use of the context of the Great Famine or An Gorta Mór. Nathan Mannion, Head of Exhibitions & Programmes for the Irish Emigration Museum, said that the game had been developed without historical consultations and that it "may very well do more harm than good". The game has been described as "repulsive", "offensive", and historically inaccurate.

== Discrimination against Irish Travellers ==
Irish Travellers are an ethnic and cultural minority group who have lived in Ireland for centuries and experience overt discrimination throughout Ireland and the United Kingdom. In nature, such discrimination is similar to antiziganism (prejudice against the Roma) in the United Kingdom and Europe, as well as the form of racism which the Irish diaspora was a victim of during the 19th century. In the United Kingdom and Ireland, media attack campaigns against Travellers have been launched in national and local newspapers as well as on the radio. Irish Travellers who work for the Irish media have stated that in Ireland, they are living under an apartheid regime. In The Irish Times in 2013, the Irish journalist Jennifer O'Connell wrote that "Our casual racism against Travellers is one of Ireland's last great shames". While there is a willingness to acknowledge that there is widespread prejudice towards Travellers in Irish society, and a recognition of discrimination against Travellers, there is still strong resistance among the Irish public to calling the treatment of Travellers racist.It is noted that about 80% of Travellers are unemployed due to such discrimination.

Examples of it include the destruction of houses which were allocated to the Travellers by the state during Traveller feuds. In 2013, a Traveller home in Ballyshannon, Co Donegal was destroyed by fire days before members of a Traveller family were due to move in. Local Councillor Pearse Doherty said the house was specifically targeted because it was to house a Traveller family and was destroyed due to a 'hatred of Travellers'. Another local Councillor Sean McEniff of Bundoran caused controversy and a complaint under the 'Incitement to Hatred Act' when he stated that, due to the house's initial purchase, Travellers "should live in isolation from the settled community." and "I would not like these people (the family) living beside me".

In England, the British television series Big Fat Gypsy Weddings has been accused of instigating bullying and it has also been accused of inciting racial hatred of Irish Travellers. The series has been the subject of a number of controversies, including allegations that its advertising is racist and allegations that it has instigated a rise in the rate of racially motivated bullying.

== See also ==
- Racism
- Anti-Catholicism
- Anglo-Saxonism
- Catholic–Protestant relations
- Philadelphia Nativist Riots
- Sectarianism in Glasgow
- Stage Irish
- Stereotypes of Irish Americans
- Sectarian violence among Christians
- White ethnic
