= Henry Stebbins =

Henry Stebbins may refer to:

- Henry G. Stebbins (1811–1881), U.S. Representative from New York
- Henry E. Stebbins (1905–1973), US ambassador
