= Crime of apartheid =

Crime of racial oppression in international law

The crime of apartheid is defined by the 2002 Rome Statute of the International Criminal Court as inhumane acts of a character similar to other crimes against humanity "committed in the context of an institutionalized regime of systematic oppression and domination by one racial group over any other racial group or groups and committed with the intention of maintaining that regime".

On 30 November 1973, the United Nations General Assembly opened for signature and ratification The International Convention on the Suppression and Punishment of the Crime of Apartheid. It defined the crime of apartheid as "inhuman acts committed for the purpose of establishing and maintaining domination by one racial group of persons over any other racial group of persons and systematically oppressing them".

According to Human Rights Watch and legal scholar Miles Jackson, apartheid is also prohibited in customary international law although there is still debate as to whether it is criminalized as well. In 2021, two former members of apartheid South Africa's security police became the first persons ever to be indicted for the crime of apartheid under customary international law.

== History ==
The term apartheid, from Afrikaans for 'apartness', was the official name of the South African system of racial segregation which existed after 1948. Complaints about the system were brought to the United Nations as early as 12 July 1948 when Padmanabha Pillai, the representative of India to the United Nations, circulated a letter to the secretary-general expressing his concerns over treatment of ethnic Indians within the Union of South Africa. As it became more widely known, South African apartheid was condemned internationally as unjust and racist and many decided that a formal legal framework was needed in order to apply international pressure on the South African government.

In 1971, the Soviet Union and Guinea together submitted early drafts of a convention to deal with the suppression and punishment of apartheid. In 1973, the General Assembly of the United Nations agreed on the text of the International Convention on the Suppression and Punishment of the Crime of Apartheid (ICSPCA). The convention has 31 signatories and 107 parties. The convention came into force in 1976 after 20 countries had ratified it. They were: Benin, Bulgaria, Chad, Czechoslovakia, Ecuador, the German Democratic Republic (East Germany), Guinea, Hungary, Iraq, Mongolia, Poland, Qatar, Somalia, Syria, the USSR, the United Arab Emirates, Tanzania, and Yugoslavia.

"As such, apartheid was declared to be a crime against humanity, with a scope that went far beyond South Africa. While the crime of apartheid is most often associated with the racist policies of South Africa after 1948, the term more generally refers to racially based policies in any state."

Seventy-six other countries subsequently signed on, but a number of nations, including Western democracies, have neither signed nor ratified the ICSPCA, including Canada, France, Germany, Israel, Italy, the Netherlands, the United Kingdom, Australia, New Zealand and the United States. In explanation of the US vote against the convention, Ambassador Clarence Clyde Ferguson Jr. said: "[W]e cannot... accept that apartheid can in this manner be made a crime against humanity. Crimes against humanity are so grave in nature that they must be meticulously elaborated and strictly construed under existing international law..."

In 1977, Addition Protocol 1 to the Geneva Conventions designated apartheid as a grave breach of the protocol and a war crime. There are 169 parties to the protocol.

The International Criminal Court provides for individual criminal responsibility for crimes against humanity, including the crime of apartheid.

The ICC came into being on 1 July 2002, and can only prosecute crimes committed on or after that date. The court can generally only exercise jurisdiction in cases where the accused is a national of a state party, the alleged crime took place on the territory of a state party, or a situation is referred to the court by the United Nations Security Council. The ICC exercises complimentary jurisdiction. Many of the member states have provided their own national courts with universal jurisdiction over the same offenses and do not recognize any statute of limitations for crimes against humanity. As of July 2026, there are 125 states parties, and a further 12 countries have signed but not yet ratified the treaty. However, many of the world's most populous nations, including China, India, the United States, Indonesia, and Pakistan are not parties to the court and therefore are not subject to its jurisdiction, except by security council referral.

== ICSPCA definition of the crime of apartheid ==
Article II of the ICSPCA defines the crime of apartheid as:

For the purpose of the present Convention, the term 'the crime of apartheid', which shall include similar policies and practices of racial segregation and discrimination as practiced in southern Africa, shall apply to the following inhumane acts committed for the purpose of establishing and maintaining domination by one racial group of persons over any other racial group of persons and systematically oppressing them:

1. Denial to a member or members of a racial group or groups of the right to life and liberty of person
  1. By murder of members of a racial group or groups;
  2. By the infliction upon the members of a racial group or groups of serious bodily or mental harm, by the infringement of their freedom or dignity, or by subjecting them to torture or to cruel, inhuman or degrading treatment or punishment;
  3. By arbitrary arrest and illegal imprisonment of the members of a racial group or groups;
2. Deliberate imposition on a racial group or groups of living conditions calculated to cause its or their physical destruction in whole or in part;
3. Any legislative measures and other measures calculated to prevent a racial group or groups from participation in the political, social, economic and cultural life of the country and the deliberate creation of conditions preventing the full development of such a group or groups, in particular by denying to members of a racial group or groups basic human rights and freedoms, including the right to work, the right to form recognised trade unions, the right to education, the right to leave and to return to their country, the right to a nationality, the right to freedom of movement and residence, the right to freedom of opinion and expression, and the right to freedom of peaceful assembly and association;
4. Any measures including legislative measures, designed to divide the population along racial lines by the creation of separate reserves and ghettos for the members of a racial group or groups, the prohibition of mixed marriages among members of various racial groups, the expropriation of landed property belonging to a racial group or groups or to members thereof;
5. Exploitation of the labour of the members of a racial group or groups, in particular by submitting them to forced labour;
6. Persecution of organizations and persons, by depriving them of fundamental rights and freedoms, because they oppose apartheid.

— International Convention on the Suppression and Punishment of the Crime of Apartheid, Article II

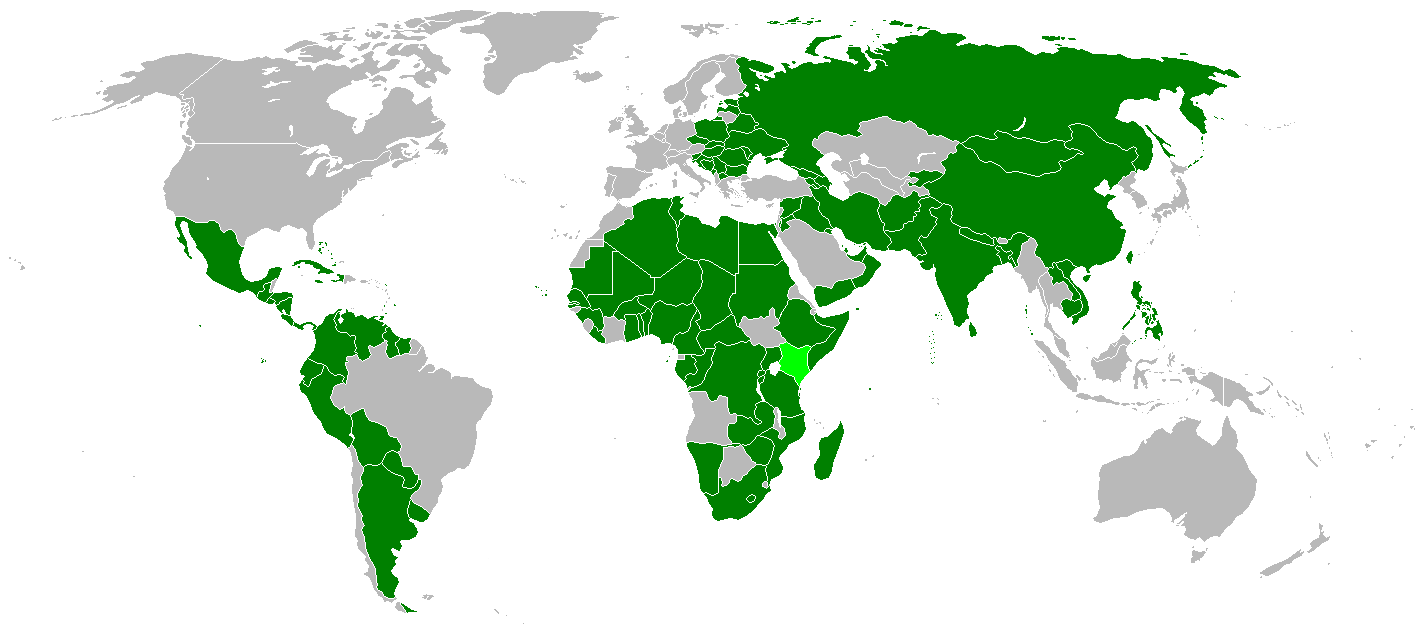
Signatories to the 1973 International Convention on the Suppression and Punishment of the Crime of Apartheid: parties in dark green, signed but not ratified in light green, non-members in grey

=== UN definition of racial discrimination ===
According to the United Nations Convention on the Elimination of All Forms of Racial Discrimination (ICERD),

the term "racial discrimination" shall mean any distinction, exclusion, restriction or preference based on race, colour, descent, or national or ethnic origin which has the purpose or effect of nullifying or impairing the recognition, enjoyment or exercise, on an equal footing, of human rights and fundamental freedoms in the political, economic, social, cultural or any other field of public life.

This definition does not make any difference between discrimination based on ethnicity and race, in part because the distinction between the two remains debatable among anthropologists. Similarly, in British law the phrase racial group means "any group of people who are defined by reference to their race, colour, nationality (including citizenship) or ethnic or national origin".

== ICC definition of the crime of apartheid ==
Article 7 of the Rome Statute of the International Criminal Court defines the crime of apartheid as:

The 'crime of apartheid' means inhumane acts of a character similar to those referred to in paragraph 1, committed in the context of an institutionalised regime of systematic oppression and domination by one racial group over any other racial group or groups and committed with the intention of maintaining that regime.

== Court cases ==
The International Court of Justice in its 2024 case on Israel's occupation of the Palestinian territories, gave an advisory opinion which found that Israel was in breach of Article 3 of International Convention on the Elimination of All Forms of Racial Discrimination, including "racial segregation and apartheid". HRW declared that "World Court Finds Israel Responsible for Apartheid".

In 2024, South Africa opened prosecutions against the alleged perpetrators of the 1982 kidnapping and murder of the Cosas Four anti-apartheid activists. In 2025, a South African court ruled that apartheid had been a crime against customary international law at the time of the crime.

In May of 2026, Israeli Finance Minister Bezalel Smotrich announced that he had been informed that the office of the Prosecutor of the International Criminal Court was seeking an arrest warrant against him. The application included the crime of apartheid as one of the charges.

== See also ==
- Internal resistance to apartheid
- Jim Crow laws
- Nuremburg laws
