= Olcott Deming =

American diplomat (1909–2007)

Olcott Hawthorne Deming

1st United States Ambassador to Uganda
- In office January 14, 1963 – June 26, 1966
- President: John F. Kennedy; Lyndon B. Johnson
- Preceded by: Office established
- Succeeded by: Henry Endicott Stebbins

U.S consul general in Okinawa
- In office 1957–1959

Personal details
- Born: February 28, 1909; Westchester County, New York, United States of America
- Died: March 20, 2007 (aged 98); Washington D.C., United States of America
- Education: Rollins College (1935)

Olcott Hawthorne Deming (February 28, 1909 – March 20, 2007) was an American career diplomat who was the first ambassador of the United States to Uganda.

== Early life ==
Deming, a great-grandson of Nathaniel Hawthorne, was born February 28, 1909, in Westchester County, New York.

He graduated from Rollins College in 1935, and worked for the Tennessee Valley Authority and as a teacher in Greenwich, Connecticut.

== Career ==
Deming joined the State Department in 1942. From 1957 to 1959, he was U.S. consul general in Okinawa. He served as Ambassador to the newly independent nation of Uganda from 1962 to 1965. He retired in 1969, later becoming an official of the American Foreign Service Association.

== Later life ==
Deming died March 20, 2007, aged 98 of sepsis at a hospice in Washington, D.C.

Diplomatic posts
Preceded by none	United States Ambassador to Uganda; 1966–1969	Succeeded by Henry Endicott Stebbins
