= Thomas Patrick Melady =

American diplomat

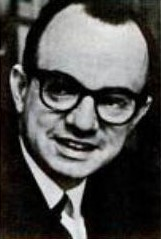
- Melady, circa 1972

3rd United States Ambassador to the Holy See
- In office 1989–1993
- President: George H. W. Bush
- Preceded by: Frank J. Shakespeare
- Succeeded by: Raymond Flynn

3rd United States Ambassador to Burundi
- In office January 31, 1970 – May 25, 1972
- President: Richard Nixon
- Preceded by: George W. Renchard
- Succeeded by: Michael P. E. Hoyt (as Chargé d'affaires)

Senior advisor to the US delegation to the UN General Assembly
- In office 1970–1973
- President: Richard Nixon

4th United States Ambassador to Uganda
- In office July 30, 1972 – February 9, 1973
- President: Richard Nixon
- Preceded by: Clarence Clyde Ferguson, Jr.
- Succeeded by: David C. Halsted (Acting); Gordon Robert Beyer (Ambassador)

President of the Africa Service Institute
- In office 1959–1967

President of Sacred Heart University
- In office 1976–1986

Senior Diplomat at The Institute of World Politics
- In office 2002–2014

Personal details
- Born: March 4, 1927 Norwich, Connecticut, U.S.
- Died: January 6, 2014 (aged 86) Washington D.C., U.S.
- Party: Republican
- Spouse: Margaret Badum Melady
- Children: 2
- Education: Duquesne University (1950, B.A.); The Catholic University of America (1955, M.A, Ph.D.)

Thomas Patrick Melady (March 4, 1927 – January 6, 2014) was an American diplomat and author. From 2002 until his death he served as the Senior Diplomat in residence at The Institute of World Politics in Washington, D.C.

== Career ==
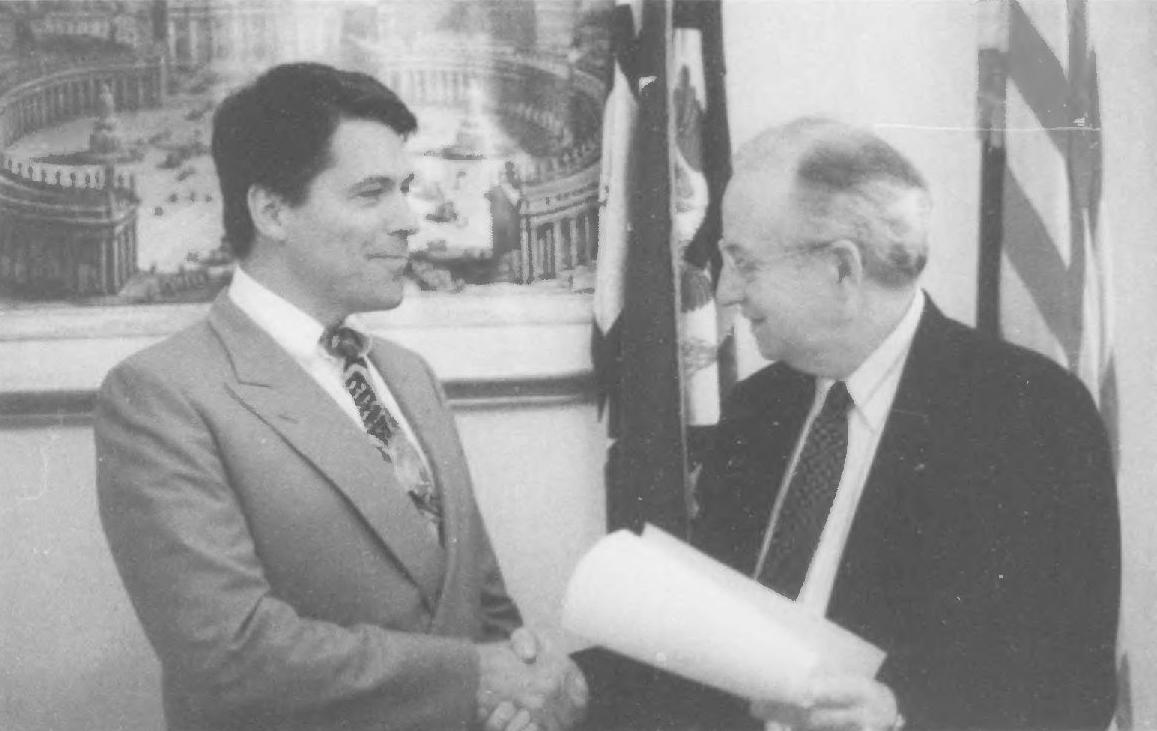
Melady presenting the Superior Honor Award to Cameron R. Hume in 1993

After his graduation from high school he served in the U.S. Army from 1945 to 1947, then graduated from Duquesne University in 1950 (B.A.) and The Catholic University of America in 1955 (M.A., Ph.D.). He was an adjunct professor at St. John's University and president of the Africa Service Institute in New York City, from 1959 to 1967. From 1966 to 1969 he was adjunct professor at Fordham University. In 1968, Melady was the first person honored with the Norwich (Connecticut) Native Son Award.

A former consultant for the National Urban League in New York and chairman of Seton Hall University, he was appointed by President Richard Nixon as ambassador to Burundi in 1969, senior advisor to the US delegation to the UN General Assembly in 1970, and ambassador to Uganda from 1972 to 1973.

In 1989 he was appointed by President George H. W. Bush as Ambassador Extraordinary and Plenipotentiary of the United States of America to the Holy See. After completing his assignment to the Holy See during the first year of the administration of President Bill Clinton, he served as distinguished visiting professor at George Washington University in Washington, D.C. According to the Associated Press, his first instruction, since declassified, was to influence the Vatican to recognize the state of Israel, something which was done a few years later in 1993.

He served as president of Sacred Heart University in Fairfield, Connecticut, from 1976 to 1986, when he became the university's president emeritus. He was later a consultant to the U.S. Secretary of Education and President Ronald Reagan appointed him to serve as assistant secretary for post-secondary education.

Melady was an authority on Afro-Asian and Central European Affairs and the author of 16 books and more than 180 articles, including Western Policy and the Third World, Uganda: The Asian Exiles, The United States and the Vatican in World Affairs, and "Bosnia and Herzegovina: The Future? Part II". He had honorary doctorates from 30 universities and was honored by six countries. He was awarded two papal knighthoods and was a Knight of Malta. He was married and had two children.

He died of brain cancer on January 6, 2014, aged 86, at his home in Washington, D.C.

== Career ==
Melady was married to Margaret Badum Melady for 52 years at the time of his passing. Badum was the Republican nominee for Connecticut State Treasurer in 1978.

Diplomatic posts
Preceded by George W. Renchard	U.S. Ambassador to Burundi; 1969–1972	Succeeded by Michael P. E. Hoyt (as Chargé d'affaires)
Preceded by Clarence Clyde Ferguson Jr.	U.S. Ambassador to Uganda; 1972–1973	Succeeded by Gordon Robert Beyer
Preceded by Frank J. Shakespeare	U.S. Ambassador to the Holy See; 1989–1993	Succeeded by Raymond Flynn
