= Apartheid Convention =

United Nations convention and human rights instrument

ICSPCA
International Convention on the Suppression and Punishment of the Crime of Apartheid
- Location: New York
- Effective: 30 November 1973
- Condition: Effective
- Signatories: 31
- Parties: 110

The 1973 United Nations International Convention on the Suppression and Punishment of the Crime of Apartheid was the first binding international treaty which declared the crime of apartheid and racial segregation under international law. It was adopted by the General Assembly on 30 November 1973 and came into force on 18 July 1976. It passed by 91 votes in favor, four against (Portugal, South Africa, the United Kingdom and the United States) and 26 abstentions. 110 countries are currently parties to the convention, with 31 signatories.

== History ==
As the crime of apartheid grew more visible, a need to address South Africa's apartheid issues rose in the 1950s-60's. Following the election of South Africa's National Party in 1948 came a swell of prejudicial and racially charged policies. In 1967, as resistance to aggressive apartheid policies grew, and the South African government doubled down on aims of segregated living and racially discriminatory policies, the international campaign against apartheid grew stronger, and the United Nations stepped in.

=== United Nations' involvement ===
Backed openly from 1967 onwards by the United Nations, government and grassroots movements attempted to form a united front with the oppressed peoples of South Africa against its tyrannical government. The United Nations called for boycotting of public events, as well as economic embargoes, something it had never done previously.

The United Nations Commission on Human Rights drew even greater attention to the apartheid issue when the Special Committee Against Apartheid raised awareness to the inhumane treatment of some political captives in South Africa. This attention, coupled with the accumulating negative history, caused The Commission on Human Rights to focus increasingly on apartheid, making it a primary concern. The Apartheid Convention of 1973 is a reaction to these items, building on arguments and agreements made in the International Convention on the Elimination of all Forms of Racial Discrimination or ICERD which took place four years prior. The new Convention was the first to explicitly define apartheid, and then attempt to effectively criminalize what the ICERD had previously only prohibited. It was drafted by the Commission on Human Rights, and then officially implemented in 1973. This convention was the first to name apartheid a crime under international law, while also being the first to name apartheid a crime against humanity. While many countries and signatories continued to oppose this terminology, the convention was the first to have signatures to this effect.

== Draft Convention ==
=== First resolution on the draft convention ===
The first meeting on the suppression and punishment of the crime of apartheid took place in the 26th session of the General Assembly, 2001st plenary meeting on 6 December 1971. The General Assembly established the conviction that the apartheid is a crime against humanity, and recognized further measures from the UN to suppress and punish the apartheid. This plenary meeting requested the secretary general to transmit the draft convention to the Commission on Human Rights. It was also recommended during this meeting that the Commission on Human Rights and the Economic Social Council consider this draft and submit the text of the draft convention to the General Assembly at its 27th session. Thus, reaffirming that apartheid constitutes a total negation of the principles of the UN, and recognizes the continual need for efforts to suppress and punish the apartheid.

This meeting further requested that the Secretary General transmit the revised draft Convention to the Special Committee on the Apartheid, and invited the Economic and Social Council to request the Commission on Human Rights to consider as a priority item the revised draft Convention and submit the results of its consideration to the 28th session of the General Assembly.

=== Second resolution on the draft convention ===
The second resolution on the draft convention on the suppression and punishment of the crime of apartheid took place in the 27th session of the General Assembly, 2085th plenary meeting, 15 November 1972.

This resolution concluded with a request to the Commission on Human Rights at its 29th session to consider the draft convention a priority item and submit the results of its consideration at the 28th session of the General Assembly.

== About the Signed Treaty ==
=== International Convention on the Suppression and Punishment of the Crime of Apartheid ===
The treaty became effective during the 28th session of the General Assembly in 1974. The apartheid Convention was adopted by the General Assembly on 30 November 1973. There were 91 votes in favor, four against (Portugal, South Africa, the United Kingdom, and the United States), and 26 abstentions. It came into force on 18 July 1976, and as of May 2025, it has been ratified by 110 states. South Africa acceded to the Apartheid Convention on 14 May 2024.

When the Apartheid Convention was being drafted in the Third Committee of the General Assembly there was a division of opinion over the scope of the convention. Most delegates saw the convention as an instrument to be employed only against South Africa. Others, however, warned that the convention was wide enough to cover other States that practiced racial discrimination.

=== Articles ===
- Article I declares apartheid a violation of the charter of the UN and a crime against humanity in its racial segregation and discrimination.
- Article II defines "inhuman acts" which constitute the crime of apartheid when "committed for the purpose of establishing and maintaining domination by one racial group of persons over any other racial group of persons and systematically oppressing them"
  - Denial of the right of life and liberty to members of racial group
    - by murder of members of a racial group or groups;
    - by inflicting physical and mental harm;
    - by arbitrary arrest and illegal imprisonment;
  - Deliberate imposition on a racial group or groups of living conditions calculated to cause its or their physical destruction in whole or in part
  - Any legislature measures that deny a group of political, social, economic, and cultural life of the country
  - Any measures designed to divide the population by racial lines
  - Exploitation of labor of members of a racial group
  - Persecution of organizations and persons because they oppose apartheid
- Article III declares that international criminal responsibility shall apply, regardless of motive and location.
- Article IV asks states parties to adopt legislative, judicial and administrative measures to suppress, prevent, and persecute the crimes of apartheid.
- Article V declares that Persons charged with the acts enumerated in article II may be tried by a tribunal of any State Party to the Convention
- Article VI requires states parties to accept and carry out the decisions of competent organs of the united nations in effort to achieve the purpose of the Convention
- Article VII requires states parties to submit periodic reports on the legislative, judicial, administrative or other measures that they have adopted
- Article VIII declares that any State Party to the present Convention may call upon any competent organ of the United Nations to take such action under the Charter of the United Nations as it considers appropriate for the prevention and suppression of the crime of apartheid.
- Article IX defines that The Chairman of the Commission on Human Rights shall appoint a group consisting of three members of the Commission on Human Rights, who are also representatives of States Parties to the present Convention, to consider reports submitted by States Parties in accordance with article VII
- Article X declares that states parties to this Convention empower the Commission on Human Rights to coordinate with other competent organs of the UN
- Article XI defines acts enumerated in article II not political crimes for the purpose of extradition
- Article XII declares that the International Court of Justice shall settle differences in the interpretation, application or implementation of the present Convention
- Article XIII: The present Convention is open for signature by all States. Any State which does not sign the convention before its entry into force may accede to it
- Article XIV is about the ramifications and further accessions of this Convention
- Article XV declares that this convention, and any future accessions, enters into force on the thirtieth day after the date of the deposit of the instrument of ratification with the Secretary-General of the UN
- Article XVI: a state may denounce the Convention through written notification to the secretary general
- Article XVII: any states parties can request a revision of the convention by notifying the secretary general, and the general assembly shall decide upon the steps, if any, to be taken in respect of such request
- Article XVIII: the secretary general shall inform all states parties of any signatures, ratifications, accessions, the date of entry into force, denunciations, and notifications relating to this convention.
- Article XIX declares that the present Convention, of which the Chinese, English, French, Russian and Spanish texts are equally authentic, shall be deposited in the archives of the United Nations. The Secretary-General of the United Nations shall transmit certified copies of the present Convention to all States

== Legacy ==
The Apartheid Convention may not presently serve its original intended purpose in dealing with apartheid in South Africa, as the legislation supporting it was withdrawn in 1990's; however, it has influenced the way we view crimes against humanity. It has impacted international law, and the Rome Statute of the International Criminal Court, among others.

=== Aftermath ===
In 1980, due to the 1973 Apartheid Convention, a special International Criminal Court was proposed in order to try persons of apartheid. However, no such court was ever established. Instead, the United States authorized a legislation that would allow them to prosecute criminals of apartheid through a universal jurisdiction.

The Apartheid Convention was abandoned in 1990 by the United Nations General Assembly. It was originally adopted for the purpose of being able to prosecute criminals who were not citizens of the state but still committed acts which violated the laws of that territory of jurisdiction.

Moreover, in 1973, the General Assembly concluded that the South African regime had no justification in representing the South African people after contemplating the report of the International Conference of Experts for the Support of Victims of Colonialism and Apartheid in Southern Africa. The Organization of African Unity (OAU) recognized various liberation movements that were, “the authentic representatives of the overwhelming majority of the South African people.”

Additional Protocol I of the Geneva Conventions of 1949 recognized apartheid as a “grave breach” of the Protocol in 1977 regardless of geographic location. The Draft Code of Crimes against the Peace and Security of Mankind recognizes apartheid as a crime on the basis of institutionalized racial discrimination as a species of crimes against humanity. The first reading was in 1991 by the International Law Commission and was read without the mention being specifically on South Africa. It was not until the second reading in 1996 where the racial denotations were brought to light as crimes against humanity. Article 18 stated, “is in fact the crime of apartheid under a more general denomination.”

The Truth and Reconciliation Commission was established in 1994 by a democratic South Africa after a peaceful negotiation settlement between the apartheid regime and parties which opposed apartheid. The Commission served the purpose of granting amnesty to those who had violated human rights regulations during the time of apartheid as well as aim to achieve reconciliation. South Africa, post-apartheid, has not become a party of the apartheid Convention.

The Rome Statute of the International Criminal Court decided to define the crime of apartheid as another form of a crime against humanity in 1998.

== See also ==
- Apartheid (crime)
- Rome Statute of the International Criminal Court (2002)

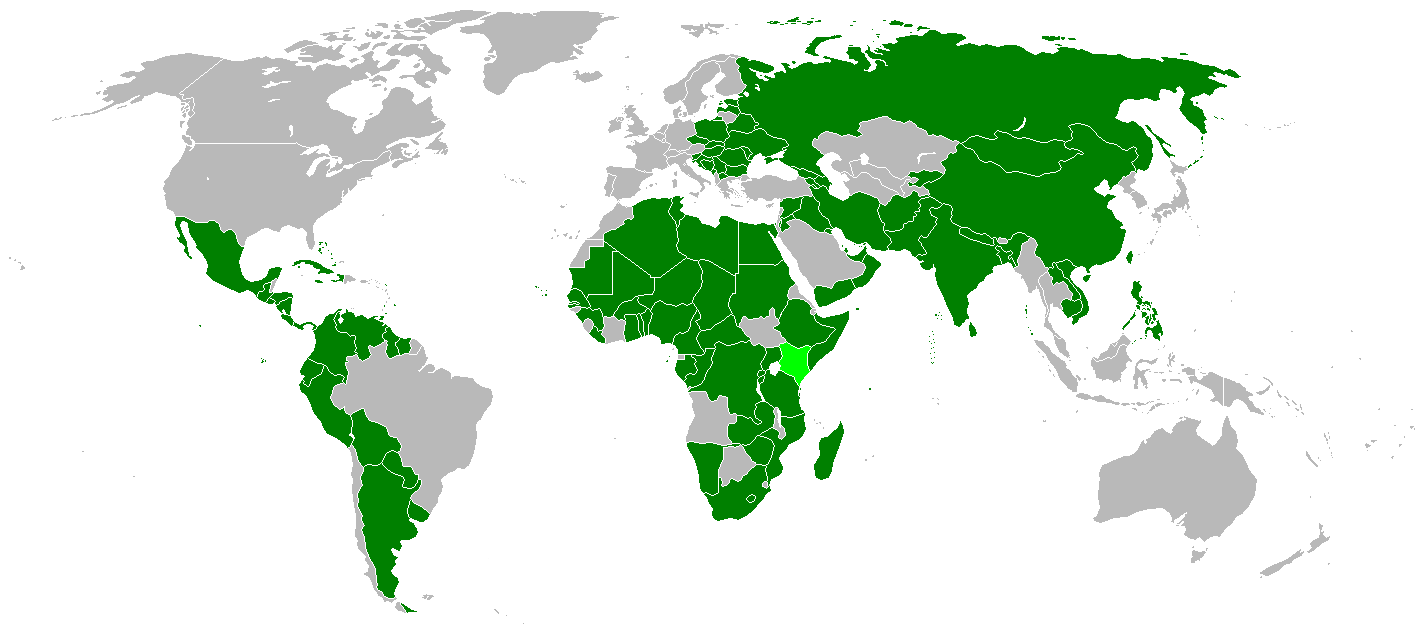
Signatories to the 1973 International Convention on the Suppression and Punishment of the Crime of Apartheid: parties in dark green, signed but not ratified in light green, non-members in grey
