= Michael P. E. Hoyt =

US diplomat

Michael Phelps Evans Hoyt
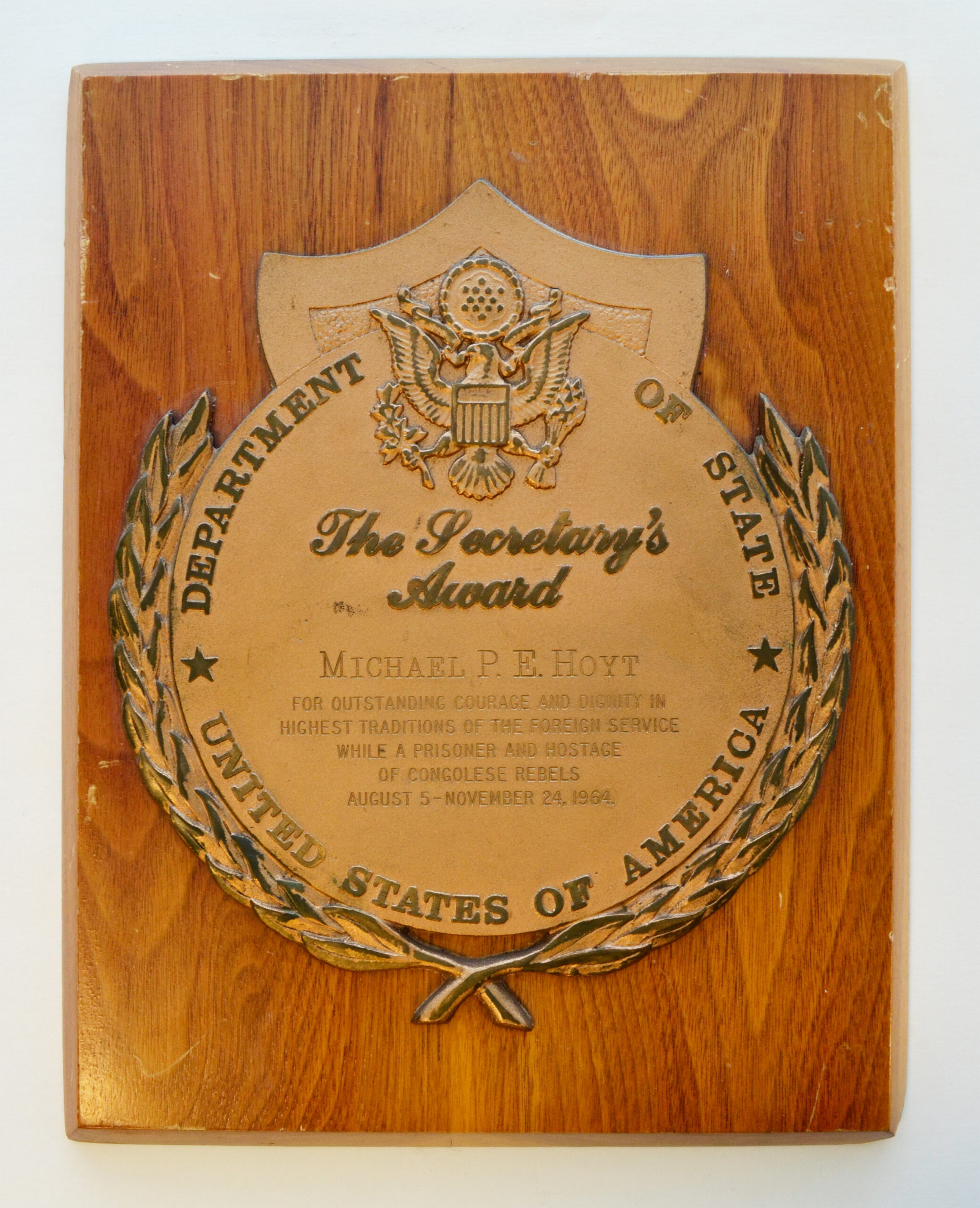
- Secretary's Award of Michael P.E. Hoyt

Consul of the United States in Stanleyville
- President: Lyndon B. Johnson

Personal details
- Born: November 16, 1929 Chicago, Illinois, U.S.
- Died: December 14, 2016 (aged 87) Santa Fe, New Mexico, U.S.
- Spouse: Jo Wasson
- Children: 4
- Parents: Frank C. Hoyt (father); Elizabeth Hoyt (mother)
- Education: Northwestern University (graduate studies in economics and African affairs)
- Alma mater: University of Illinois Urbana-Champaign (Master's Degree in Modern European History)
- Awards: Secretary's Award

Michael Phelps Evans Hoyt (Chicago, 16 November 1929 — Santa Fe, New Mexico, 14 December 2016) was an American Foreign Service Officer and, as his country's consul in Stanleyville, a hostage for 111 days during the Simba rebellion.

== Early life and family ==
Michael Hoyt was born in 1929 as the son of Frank and Elizabeth Hoyt. His father Frank C. Hoyt was a quantum physicist involved in the Manhattan Project. Hoyt received a Bachelor's Degree in Philosophy in 1950 and in History in 1955, both the University of Chicago. He received and a Master's Degree in Modern European History from the University of Illinois Urbana-Champaign and attended graduate studies in economics and African affairs at Northwestern University. He served in the United States Air Force for four years became an air traffic controller during the Korean War. He married Jo Wasson in 1954.

== Diplomatic career ==
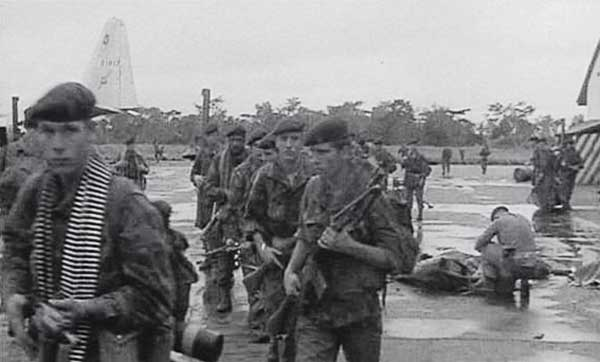
Para-Commandos at the airport of Stanleyville

Hoyt entered US diplomatic service in 1956 and would serve in diplomatic and consular positions in Pakistan, Morocco, Congo, Cameroon, Burundi, Nigeria, Switzerland, and Washington DC. He was the consul of the United States in Stanleyville (current-day Kisangani) at the time of the Simba Rebellion, rebels in the East of the country who claimed to be successors to first Prime Minister Patrice Lumumba. Hoyt negotiated with the rebels, but was at times beaten by the rebels. One episode saw Hoyt and his four assistants in the consulate retire to the office's strong room, leaving one whisky bottle behind for the rebels. The Simba rebels soon reeled away. On 24 November 1964, United States and Belgian regiments drove back the rebels during the joint Operation Dragon Rouge. The European and American hostages were rescued, but many foreigners including Paul Carlson died during the raid. Hoyt arrived back in the United States on 26 November 1964. For his "outstanding courage and dignity" during the rebellion, Hoyt was awarded the Secretary's Award of the Department of State.

Hoyt was the Chargé d'affaires in Burundi during the Ikiza killings, often characterised as a genocide, in June 1972, replacing Thomas Patrick Melady.

== Honours ==
- In August 2016, representative of New Mexico Senator Tom Udall, Bobbie Ferrell, presented the Flag of the United States to Hoyt.

== Bibliography ==
- Hoyt, Michael (1962). Migratory Labor in West Africa. Northwestern University Program of African Studies.
- Hoyt, Michael (1996-11-01). "Bloodshed in Burundi" (PDF). Foreign Service Journal: 54–57.
- Hoyt, Michael (2000). Captive in the Congo: A Consul's Return to the Heart of Darkness. Naval Institute Press. ISBN 1-55750-323-0.
- Hoyt, Michael (2014). "THE COMMERCIAL AGENT'S LAMENT - Congo: The Miserable Expeditions and Dreadful Death of Lt. Emory Taunt, USN. By Andrew C. A. Jampoler. Annapolis, Maryland: Naval Institute Press, 2013. Pp. xii 256. $44.95, hardback (ISBN 978-1-61251-079-8)". The Journal of African History. 55 (1): 119–121. doi:10.1017/S0021853713000947. S2CID 161955848.
