= Mrs F. R. Phillips =

English entertainer and songwriter (1830–1899)

- Born: Mary Ann Dunn; 1830; Tottenham, England
- Died: 10 December 1899 (aged 68–69); Lambeth, England
- Occupations: Entertainer, songwriter
- Years active: 1850s–1887

Mrs F. R. Phillips (born Mary Ann Dunn, 1830 – 10 December 1899) was an English entertainer and songwriter, who was one of the music halls' first female performers.

== Biography ==
She was born in 1830, in Tottenham, and in 1853 married Frederick Powys Royle, described as a "professor of music". By the early 1860s, she had become a popular performer at music halls in London.

She wrote the lyrics of, and performed, one of several versions of a song, "No Irish Need Apply", adapting a tune performed earlier by Tom Hudson as "The Spider and the Fly". Similar songs entitled "No Irish Need Apply" were sung in the United States at around the same time and it is unclear whether or not Mrs Phillips' song was the original. Mrs Phillips' version alluded to the supposed ban on Irish men working at the Great Exhibition in 1851. One version of Mrs Phillips' lyrics included these verses:

You talk about your soldiers, now tell me if you can,
If the bravest of them all are not Irish men,
In Russia, and in China too, and India by the by,
You never say when you want men, no Irish need apply,
For if you want good soldiers, listen to me by the by,
Would you ever have a Wellington if no Irish need apply.

Of generals and statesmen, old Ireland can boast,
Her poets too, 'tis well known to you, are universal toasts,
There’s Campbell, Moore and Lover, and Goldsmith by the by,
You would not get their equals if no Irish need apply,
You talk about your country, but you know tis all my eye,
For the best feather in your cap is when Irish do apply.

Impresario Charles Morton described her as a "rich-toned acting vocalist". A review in The Era in 1872 said of her: "This lady has been long before the public and she is, without question, one of that public's greatest favourites. Strange to say, she has achieved her position without the aid of a good voice... [But] Mrs Phillips has a style peculiarly her own and her songs are invariably so well written and are given with such expression that she never fails to take her audience by storm."

In later years, she performed as Ma Phillips. She gave her final performance in 1887, and died in Lambeth, on 10 December 1899, aged 68 or 69.
