= Frank C. Hoyt =

American physicist (1898–1980)

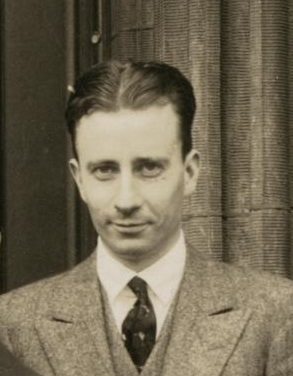
- Hoyt in 1929
- Born: Frank Clark Hoyt; 12 September 1898; Chicago, Illinois, U.S.
- Died: 30 January 1980 (aged 81); Los Alamos, New Mexico, U.S.
- Occupation: Physicist
- Children: 2, including Michael

Frank Clark Hoyt (12 September 1898 – 30 January 1980) was an American physicist, regarded as one of the first theoretical physicists to come from the USA in the period that quantum mechanics was being developed.

== Biography ==
He was born to Carrie Louise Stokes and Louis Phelps Hoyt, an organist. He went to Harvard School for Boys. At school, his primary interest was literature - he wanted to study Greek - but the path to science developed in his final year after taking chemistry and physics courses. He enrolled at the Massachusetts Institute of Technology, starting in chemical engineering, moving towards pure chemistry before being influenced by his teachers towards physics. After completing his BSc in 1918 (a year early because of World War I), he remained as an assistant, taking his MSc a year later on the subject of X-ray crystallography. In 1920, he followed David L. Webster as a graduate student to Stanford University, working with Webster on excitation potentials of X-ray lines until 1921, when he completed his PhD.

=== Theoretical physics ===
After a period as an instructor at the University of Wisconsin—his transition period to becoming a theoretician—Hoyt received a National Research Council (NRC) fellowship to travel to Europe for studies. Danish physicist, Niels Bohr, had founded the Institute for Theoretical Physics at the University of Copenhagen which became the World centre of quantum-physics studies. Hoyt travelled around Europe with his parents before basing himself in Copenhagen from autumn 1922 to spring 1924. During this period, he met key personalities who developed quantum mechanics—and their classically-established elders—with whom he was to maintain connexions throughout his career, including Bohr, Albert Einstein, Erwin Schrödinger, Werner Heisenberg, Wolfgang Pauli, John von Neumann, Leo Szilard and Fritz London. While there, he learned to speak Danish, along with others such as Pauli, and stayed with a Danish family, although all of the conversations Hoyt had with Bohr were in English. Between 1923 and 1925, he wrote papers on the application of Bohr's correspondence principle and he translated Bohr's Nobel Prize lecture into English and also later ones. In 1924, he joined the University of Chicago, with the encouragement of Henry Gale (an avowed experimental physicist); this was initially under a second NRC fellowship, before employment as a research associate from 1926. On 16 January 1926, he married Elisabeth Louisa Camp and they had a daughter, Elisabeth, the same year. He was assistant professor at Chicago from 1927. Until 1927, Hoyt was the sole theoretical physicist in Chicago and his lectures were attended by Karl and Arthur Compton. Karl Compton wrote a reference supporting Hoyt's application for funds to study in Berlin: "There is no field in physics at the present time which is of such great importance and in which there is more to be done than in the field which Dr. Hoyt has chosen." He received a Guggenheim Fellowship for a year from September 1927, nominally with Schrödinger, who was at the University of Zurich, although he spent a good deal of this time in Berlin.

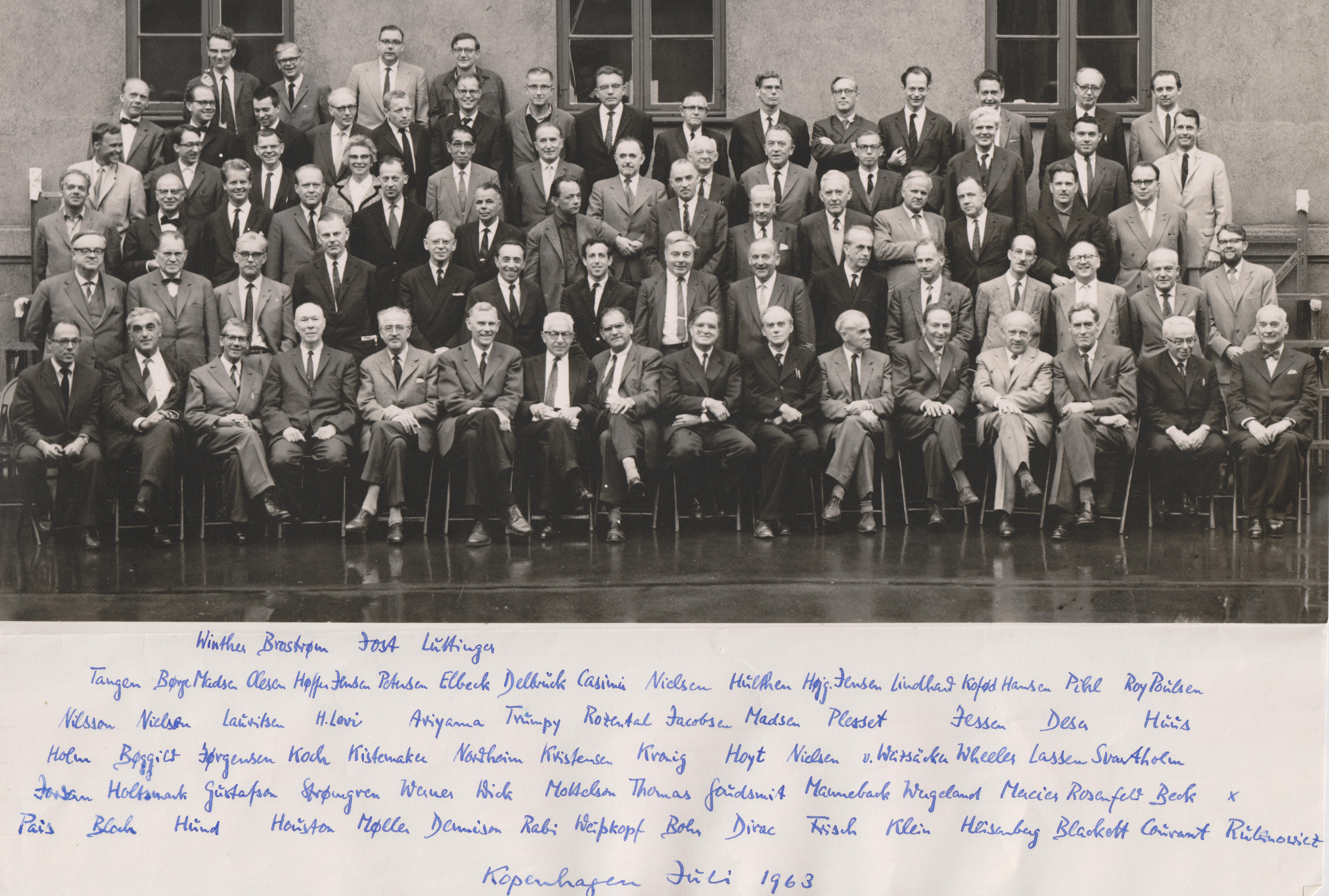
Hoyt amongst contemporaries and collaborators at the Niels Bohr commemoration, Copenhagen, 1963

=== Professorship and industrial career ===
In 1930, Hoyt, with Carl Eckart (another young American theoretical physicist who he'd met in Berlin and who had joined him in Chicago), wrote an English translation of Heisenberg's Physikalischen Prinzipien der Quantentheorie, which Heisenberg gave as a series of lectures in 1929 and Hoyt and Eckert compiled from their own notes, making corrections from Heisenberg's notes while Heisenberg while he was still available in the USA. Neither manuscript was complete by this time so the English and German versions are notably different. Hoyt was an associate professor at Chicago through the 1930s and then became executive principal of the physics department in the 1940s. In 1941, he was a staff signatory to a statement advocating American support for the British against the Nazis. He did not continue with academic physics, moving instead to industrial applications. After World War II, he worked on classified projects for the United States Atomic Energy Commission (USAEC). Before 1949, he and other physicists such as Hans Bethe, Enrico Fermi, Edward Teller, Lothar Nordheim and von Neumann worked a few months per year at Los Alamos National Laboratory. He became director of the Theoretical Nuclear Physics Division at Argonne National Laboratory. He continued to do work with the USAEC in the 1950s and later he moved to Lockheed in Palo Alto, California, to the missiles and space division, where finished his career. He died in Los Alamos in 1980, aged 81, survived by his daughter and his son, the diplomat Michael P. E. Hoyt.
