= Cosas Four =

Killed student anti-apartheid activists

The Cosas Four were four anti-apartheid activists from the Congress of South African Students (COSAS) assassinated by the Vlakplaas death squad from the Security Branch. Their killing in a 1982 bombing attack was the first crime to be indicted as a crime of apartheid, in 2021.

== 1982 bombing ==
On 15 February 1982, three members of COSAS—Eustice Madikela, Peter Matabane, Fanyana Nhlapo—were killed in a bombing attack at the Krugersdorp mine pump house orchestrated by the Security Branch, while a fourth, Zandisile Musi, endured severe injuries and died of them in 2021. The killing was ordered by Jan Coetzee, who later received amnesty for his role in the killing.

== 1999 confession to the Truth and Reconciliation Commission ==
After the end of the South African apartheid government, several perpetrators from the Security Branch, including Christiaan Siebert Rorich and Thlomedi Ephraim Mfalapitsa, came forward to the Truth and Reconciliation Commission (TRC) in 1999. They confessed to the murders, confirming that the bombing was intentional. Mfalapitsa was an African National Congress (ANC) activist who had been trained in East Germany before becoming disillusioned with the anti-apartheid movement and voluntarily returning to South Africa in 1981. At his TRC hearing he stated that he did not wish to fight for either side, but "was forced to join" the Vlakplaas death squad. He admitted to accompanying the Cosas activists in a van to the killing spot and promising to teach them how to use explosives. He had left the building and locked it, then went to Rorich who remotely triggered the explosion that killed the three activists. In 2001, the TRC refused amnesty to some of the perpetrators, finding the crime was insufficiently connected to a political aim. In 2003, the case was one of over 300 that the TRC referred for prosecution. Allegedly, political interference prevented prosecutors from acting on the referral until 2017, despite lobbying from victims' families.

== 2021 indictments ==
In 2021, the two perpetrators still alive—Rorich and Mfalapitsa—were indicted with kidnapping, murder, and the crimes against humanity of murder and apartheid. Their trial has been repeatedly postponed. After Mfalapitsa was charged, in 2024 a court decision declined to overturn the refusal of amnesty leaving the door open to his prosecution. The trial was also delayed because a court ordered the state to pay for Rorich's legal defense.

Lawyers for the defendants argued that the statute of limitations had expired and that the crimes against humanity charges were illegally retroactive. In 2025, a South African court ruled that the accused could face trial on both crimes against humanity charges as these crimes were part of customary international law at the time of the killing, and do not expire. The South Africa Litigation Centre states that the ruling is "a seismic moment for all victims, survivors and families who suffered from the conduct of an oppressive regime". This is the first indictment anywhere in the world for the crime of apartheid and the first time that South African prosecutors have issued an indictment for crimes against humanity. In order to be convicted of apartheid, the prosecution would still need to prove that the elements of the crime are met, including that it was committed for the "purpose of establishing and maintaining domination by one racial group of persons over any other racial group of persons and systematically oppressing them".
