= George W. Renchard =

American diplomat (1907–1982)

2nd Ambassador of the United States to Burundi
- In office August 10, 1968 – October 15, 1969
- President: Lyndon B. Johnson; Richard Nixon
- Preceded by: Donald A. Dumont
- Succeeded by: Thomas P. Melady

Personal details
- Born: June 19, 1907 Detroit, Michigan, U.S.
- Died: January 15, 1982 (aged 74) Saudi Arabia
- Education: Princeton University (1930)

George Wilmot Renchard Jr. (19 June 1907 in Detroit, Michigan – January 15, 1982, in Saudi Arabia) was an American career foreign service officer, ambassador to Burundi (1968–1969), and U.S. consul general in Bermuda.

Renchard graduated from Princeton University and entered the Foreign Service in 1930.

== Washington, DC home ==
Renchard and his wife Stellita Stapleton Renchard were the third owners of a "stately Italianate mission-style home in the Sheridan-Kalorama neighborhood of Northwest Washington". The leased three mansion to the US government to be used when Blair House was being redecorated. Dignitaries who stayed there include Emperor Haile Selassie of Ethiopia, the king and queen of Afghanistan, the president of Bolivia and the prime minister of Ireland.

They were considered "noted preservationists", particularly in the Dupont Circle neighborhood of Washington, DC. The Renchard Prize for historical preservation is named for the couple.

== Death ==
Renchard and his wife died in a 1982 traffic accident while visiting their son in Saudi Arabia.
