= The Physical Principles of the Quantum Theory =

Book by Werner Heisenberg

- Book cover
- Author: Werner Heisenberg
- Original title: Physikalischen Prinzipien der Quantentheorie
- Translator: Carl Eckart and Frank C. Hoyt
- Language: German and English
- Series: Dover books on physics
- Subject: Quantum theory
- Genre: Non-fiction
- Published: Germany, United States
- Publisher: S. Hirzel Verlag, University of Chicago Press, Dover Publications
- Publication date: 1930
- Publication place: Germany
- English publication date: 1930, 1949, 2009, 2013, 2015
- Media type: Print, ebook
- Pages: 183 (1st edition)
- ISBN: 9780486601137
- OCLC: 551956049
- Dewey Decimal: 530.1
- LC Class: QC174.1 .H4
- Website: Publisher

The Physical Principles of the Quantum Theory (German: Physikalischen Prinzipien der Quantentheorie) by Nobel laureate (1932) Werner Heisenberg and subsequently translated by Carl Eckart and Frank C. Hoyt. The book was first published in 1930 by University of Chicago Press. Then in 1949, according to its copyright page, Dover Publications reprinted the "unabridged and unaltered" 1930's version.

The book is collection of 1929 university lectures delivered at the University of Chicago by Heisenberg but with more detailed mathematics. The book discusses quantum mechanics and one 1931 review states that this is a "less technical and less involved account of the theor[y]". This book has been cited more than 2,000 times.

In the book, after briefly discussing various theories, including quantum theory, Heisenberg discusses the basis for the fundamental concepts of quantum theory. Also by this time Heisenberg has stated, "the interaction between observer and object causes uncontrollable and large changes in the [atomic] system being observed...". In this work Heisenberg also discusses his uncertainty principle or uncertainty relations.

== About the author ==
Werner Heisenberg (b. 1901 - d. 1976) was a renowned German theoretical physicist whose work pioneered and advanced quantum mechanics. He received his PhD in 1923 from LMU Munich under Arnold Sommerfeld. He was awarded the 1932 Nobel Prize in Physics "for the creation of quantum mechanics, the application of which has led to the discovery of the allotropic forms of hydrogen".
