= Henry E. Stebbins =

American diplomat

7th United States Ambassador to Nepal
- In office November 25, 1959 – June 10, 1966
- President: Dwight D. Eisenhower; John F. Kennedy; Lyndon B. Johnson
- Preceded by: Ellsworth Bunker
- Succeeded by: Carol Laise

2nd United States Ambassador to Uganda
- In office July 22, 1966 – September 2, 1969
- President: Lyndon B. Johnson; Richard Nixon
- Preceded by: Olcott Deming
- Succeeded by: Clarence Clyde Ferguson, Jr.

Personal details
- Born: 1905 Milton, Massachusetts, U.S.
- Died: March 23, 1973 (aged 67–68) Atlantic Ocean
- Occupation: American ambassador for Nepal and Uganda

Henry Endicott Stebbins (1905 in Milton, Massachusetts – 1973) was a career Foreign Service Officer who was the first US Ambassador to Nepal. He also served as Ambassador to Uganda.

== Early life ==
Stebbins’ parents were Rev. Roderick Stebbins and Edith Endicott (Marean) Stebbins. He graduated from Milton Academy and then Harvard in 1927.

== Career ==
On July 1, 1939, Stebbins entered the State Department as foreign service officer of Class 8. He had various posts throughout Europe and Turkey before being named vice consul in London under Joseph P. Kennedy in 1939. When he was first secretary of the London Embassy in 1945, he met his future wife, Barbara Jennifer Worthington, a native of Dorset, England. In 1951 he went to Melbourne, Australia as Consul. President Dwight D. Eisenhower promoted him to foreign service inspector in 1955, naming him senior inspector a year later. In 1959 Eisenhower named Stebbins the first Ambassador to Nepal where he served until 1966.

When his 89 year old mother found out President Lyndon B. Johnson appointed him Ambassador to Uganda in 1966, she said she was thrilled to hear of his appointment but wished he was a street sweeper in Milton because “at least he’d be home.” He retired from the Service three years later, returning to Milton.

== Death ==
On March 28, 1973, Stebbins apparently fell from the deck of the S.S. Leonardo da Vinci and was considered lost at sea.

== See also ==
- List of people who disappeared mysteriously at sea
