= List of ambassadors of the United States to Uganda =

Ambassador of the United States to Uganda
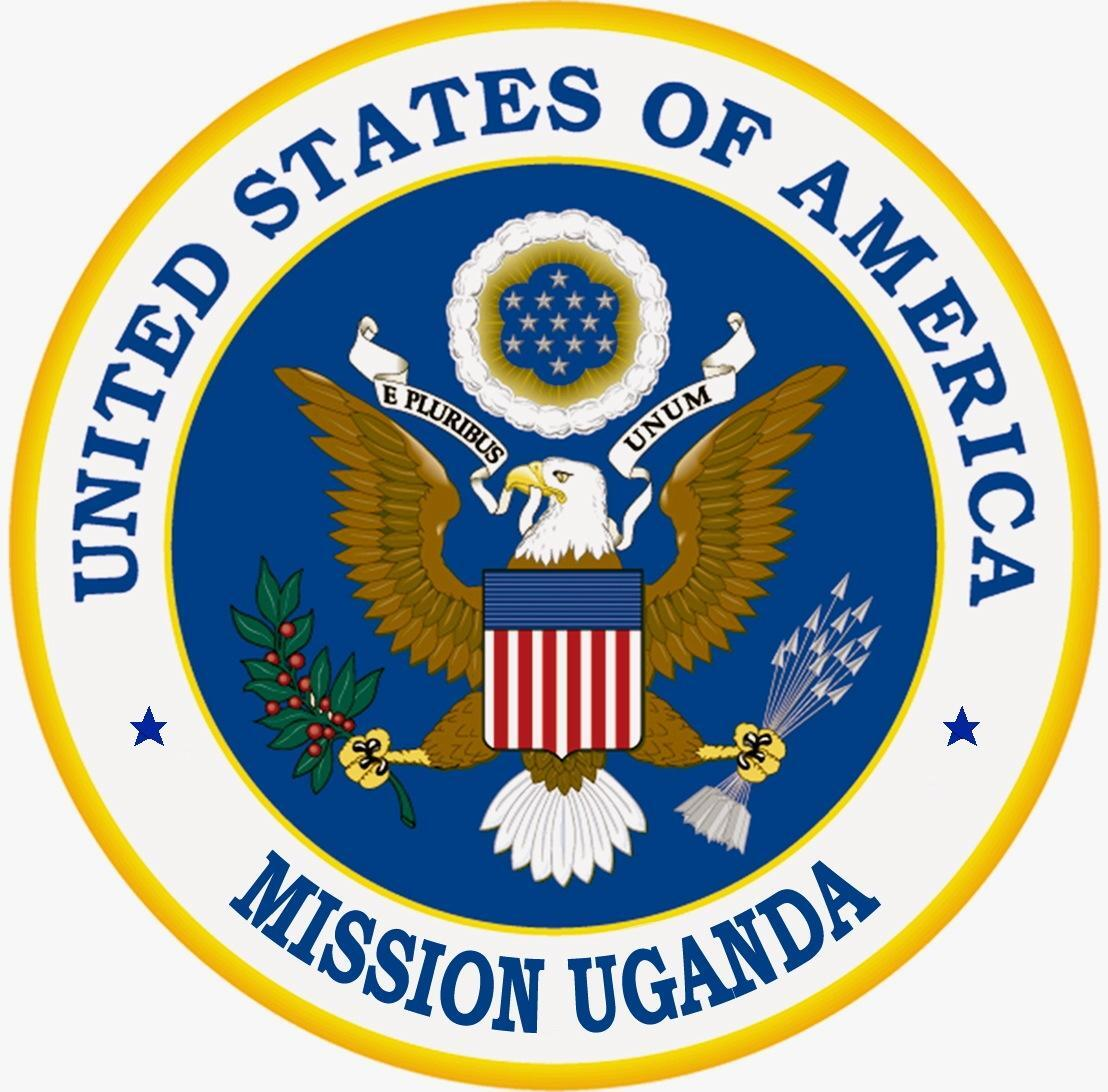
- Logo of the United States Mission to Uganda

- Flag of a United States ambassador

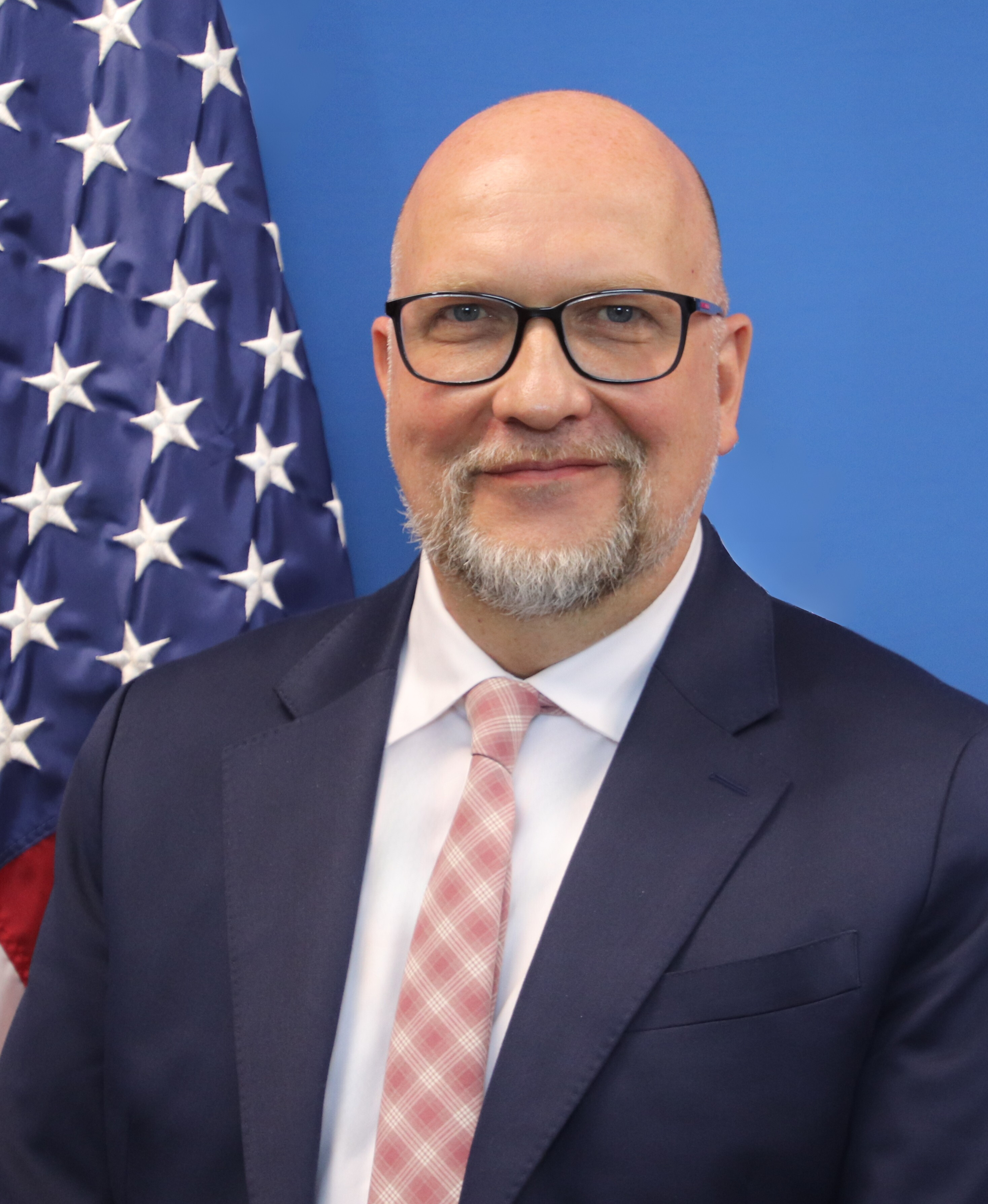
- Incumbent; Mikael Claverly; Chargé d'affaires ad interim since June 2, 2026
- United States Department of State
- Style: Mister Ambassador
- Residence: Kampala, Uganda
- Nominator: The president of the United States
- Term length: At the pleasure of the president
- Inaugural holder: Olcott Deming as Ambassador Extraordinary and Plenipotentiary
- Formation: January 7, 1963
- Website: ug.usembassy.gov

The United States ambassador to Uganda is the official representative of the government of the United States to the government of Uganda.

== Ambassadors ==
Name	Title	Appointed	Presented credentials	Terminated mission	Notes
Olcott Deming – Career FSO	Ambassador Extraordinary and Plenipotentiary	January 7, 1963	January 14, 1963	June 26, 1966	
Henry Endicott Stebbins – Career FSO	Ambassador Extraordinary and Plenipotentiary	June 27, 1966	July 22, 1966	September 2, 1969	
Clarence Clyde Ferguson, Jr. – Political appointee	Ambassador Extraordinary and Plenipotentiary	March 17, 1970	June 30, 1970	July 19, 1972	
Thomas Patrick Melady – Political appointee	Ambassador Extraordinary and Plenipotentiary	June 12, 1972	July 30, 1972	February 9, 1973	
David Crane Halsted – Career FSO	Chargé d'Affaires ad interim	June 18, 1979	N/A	1980	
Gordon Robert Beyer – Career FSO	Ambassador Extraordinary and Plenipotentiary	May 23, 1980	June 13, 1980	May 31, 1983	
Allen Clayton Davis – Career FSO	Ambassador Extraordinary and Plenipotentiary	April 5, 1983	July 1, 1983	August 14, 1985	
Robert Gordon Houdek – Career FSO	Ambassador Extraordinary and Plenipotentiary	October 28, 1985	November 22, 1985	August 17, 1988	
John A. Burroughs, Jr. – Political appointee	Ambassador Extraordinary and Plenipotentiary	August 12, 1988	November 4, 1988	August 28, 1991	
Johnnie Carson – Career FSO	Ambassador Extraordinary and Plenipotentiary	July 2, 1991	September 18, 1991	August 9, 1994	
E. Michael Southwick – Career FSO	Ambassador Extraordinary and Plenipotentiary	August 26, 1994	October 6, 1994	August 1, 1997	
Nancy Jo Powell – Career FSO	Ambassador Extraordinary and Plenipotentiary	November 7, 1997	December 4, 1997	July 9, 1999	
Martin George Brennan – Career FSO	Ambassador Extraordinary and Plenipotentiary	August 9, 1999	October 11, 1999	July 5, 2002	
Jimmy J. Kolker – Career FSO	Ambassador Extraordinary and Plenipotentiary	October 3, 2002	November 17, 2002	September 30, 2005	
Steven A. Browning – Career FSO	Ambassador Extraordinary and Plenipotentiary	February 21, 2005	April 26, 2006	July 5, 2009	
Jerry P. Lanier – Career FSO	Ambassador Extraordinary and Plenipotentiary	August 10, 2009	January 24, 2010	June 11, 2012	
Scott H. DeLisi - Career FSO	Ambassador Extraordinary and Plenipotentiary	June 30, 2012	September 3, 2012	September 18, 2015	
Deborah R. Malac – Career FSO	Ambassador Extraordinary and Plenipotentiary	December 18, 2015	February 27, 2016	January 26, 2020	
Natalie E. Brown – Career FSO	Ambassador Extraordinary and Plenipotentiary	August 6, 2020	November 17, 2020	August 30, 2023	
William W. Popp – Career FSO	Ambassador Extraordinary and Plenipotentiary	July 27, 2023	September 20, 2023	June 2, 2026	
Mikael Cleverley	Chargé d'affaires ad interim	June 2, 2026		Present	

== See also ==
- Uganda – United States relations
- Foreign relations of Uganda
- Ambassadors of the United States
