= Clarence Clyde Ferguson Jr. =

American diplomat

C. Clyde Ferguson Jr.

3rd United States Ambassador to Uganda
- In office June 30, 1970 – July 19, 1972
- President: Richard Nixon
- Preceded by: Henry Endicott Stebbins
- Succeeded by: Thomas Patrick Melady

Personal details
- Born: Clarence Clyde Ferguson Jr. 4 November 1924 Wilmington, North Carolina, U.S.
- Died: 21 December 1983 (aged 59) Boston, Massachusetts, U.S.
- Spouse: Dolores Zimmerman
- Occupation: Professor of law, diplomat

Clarence Clyde Ferguson Jr. (4 November 1924 – 21 December 1983) was an American professor of law and a United States ambassador to Uganda.

Having experienced the horrors of World War II, as a diplomat he "labored tirelessly to safeguard and extend the fundamental freedoms" essential to world peace. He was the main proponent in many decisions implementing the social provisions of the U.N. Charter and the Universal Declaration of Human Rights, particularly in relation to apartheid, and more generally in relation to all forms of racial, religious, and cultural discrimination. Ferguson was the chief draftsman of the United Nations Educational, Scientific, and Cultural Organization's statement on race in 1967 and is considered the "founding father" of affirmative action.

In 1969, he served as the US ambassador-at-large and coordinator for civilian relief in the Nigerian Civil War and negotiated the "Protocol on Relief to Nigeria Civilian Victims of the Civil War." He served as ambassador to Uganda in 1970 and as deputy assistant secretary of state for African affairs in 1973. From 1973 to 1975 he was the U.S. representative to the United Nations Economic and Social Council. He had an important role in the defence of human rights in Chile, influencing U.S's actions against Pinochet's crimes.

Ferguson held a professorship at Rutgers University and served as dean of the Howard University School of Law from 1963 to 1969. He joined the faculty of Harvard Law School in 1976 and worked there until his death. The C. Clyde Ferguson Annual Lecture at Howard University School of Law is named after him, as is the Clyde Ferguson award presented by the Association of American Law Schools.

He wrote books including Materials on Trial Presentations and Racism in American Education, and contributed to US Ratification of the Human Rights Treaties.

== Personal life ==
He was the son of Clarence Clyde (a minister) and Georgena (Owens) Ferguson. Although he was the son and grandson of African Methodist Episcopal ministers, he was not formally affiliated with any denomination. He married Dolores Zimmerman, now deceased, on 14 February 1954. She was an artist. Together they had three children: Claire, Hope, and Eve.

== Education ==
He received a Bachelor of Arts degree (cum laude) from Ohio State University in 1948, and a Bachelor of Law degree (cum laude) from Harvard University in 1951. He was awarded a Doctor of Law degree by Rutgers University in 1966, and again by Williams College in 1976.

== Other career events ==
He served in the US Army from 1943 to 1946. taking part in the Battle of Normandy and the fighting in Europe that followed. He received a Bronze Star. He worked on the legal defence team of the National Association for the Advancement of Colored People. He served as president of the American Society of International Law from 1978 to 1980.

== Bibliography ==
- (With Albert P. Blaustein) Desegregation and the Law: The Meaning and Effect of the School Segregation Cases, Rutgers University Press, 1957, 2nd edition, 1960.
- Materials on Trial Presentations, Rutgers University, 1957.
- Enforcement and Collection of Judgments and Liens, Institute for Continuing Legal Education, Rutgers University, 1961.
- Secured Transactions: Article IX Uniform Commercial Code in New Jersey, Sooney & Sage, 1961.
- (With others) Racism in American Education, Random House, 1970.
- (Contributor) Lillich, editor, US Ratification of the Human Rights Treaties, University of Virginia Press, 1981.

Diplomatic posts
Preceded by Henry E. Stebbins	US Ambassador to Uganda; 1970–1972	Succeeded by Thomas Patrick Melady
