= William Cotter =

William Cotter may refer to:

- William Richard Cotter (1882–1916), English soldier and recipient of the Victoria Cross
- William R. Cotter (politician) (1926–1981), Democratic Party member of the United States House of Representatives from Connecticut
- William R. Cotter (college president), lawyer and President of Colby College
- William Cotter (bishop) (1866–1940), Irish-born Roman Catholic bishop of Portsmouth, England
- Bill Cotter (born 1943), Irish Fine Gael politician, former TD and Senator
- William Cotter (pirate) (1670–1702), was a pirate who once owned the Gresham Estate in Edgewater, Maryland.

== See also ==
- William Cotter Maybury, politician from Michigan
