= Mulcahy (surname) =

Origin
- Origin: South Munster
- Motto: Cathach Abú—Cathach to Victory

Other names
- Variant forms: Mulcaghy, Mulkay, Mulkey, O'Mulcahy, Mulcahey, McCauley

Mulcahy is a surname of Irish Gaelic origin. The anglicized form of "Ó Maolchatha" which in Gaelic means 'a descendant of a devotee of Cathach', a personal name meaning "Warlike". The name is thought to originate in County Tipperary, however the earliest mention of the family appears in the Annals of Inisfallen in 1317 and subsequent references in and around the Churches of County Kerry in the 15th century.

== History ==
The pre-eminent authority on Irish surnames, Edward MacLysaght wrote of the remarkable lack of medieval reference to the Mulcahy surname in the annalistic records. The only known reference to a member of the sept in any Annalistic record is from the Annals of Inisfallen in 1317 AD A Giolla Moenaig Ó Maolchatha is mentioned as a "Keeper of the Island" which could possibly be evidence of the family's earlier erenagh status within the local area. Furthermore, the Uí Mhaolchatha sept appears to have been active in the 15th century in the churches of County Kerry. Benefices were granted by papal decree to a number of the sept, including the Vicarages of Killarney, Ardfert and Aghadoe. There is evidence that these benefices were held within the sept for a number of generations, supporting the notion that the family had developed a political hold on the offices without having even been ordained as priests. The Annalistic record for a Giolla Moenaig Ó Maolchatha in the Annals of Inisfallen in 1317 AD combined with the above-mentioned appointments of the vicarages would support the idea that the Uí Mhaolchatha of County Kerry had developed into a modest ecclesiastical dynasty.

== Etymology ==
The surname is of ecclesiastical origin. While it is true that Cathach means Warlike, the inclusion of the prefix Maol refers to a 'devotee' of an individual whose name was Cathach. So the full name of Ó Maolchatha means 'A descendant of a devotee of Cathach' most likely the name of a saint.

== O'More theory ==
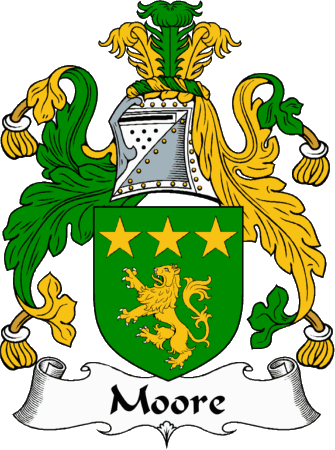
The Arms of O'More, often erroneously attributed to Mulcahy

There exists a popularly circulated theory regarding the Mulcahy families origins. The theory first proposed by historian John O'Hart in his highly flawed work, Irish Pedigrees, claims that the Mulcahy family descend from the O'More family of County Laois. O'Hart makes mention of a John O'More who he claims was a younger brother of Rory Caech O'More and who adopted the surname Maolcatha. This theory is almost certainly wrong. O'Hart, intentionally or unintentionally had attributed the origins of the Mulcahy family with O'More on the basis of the name which John O'More had adopted. The name John O'More adopted was not Maolchatha as O'Hart had claimed but actually Maolchathail, and it is from him that the County Laois sept of Ó Maolchathail usually anglicized Mulhall, claim descent. No substantial evidence exists to support the notion that Rory Caech O'More even had a brother named John, making even the claim of the Mulhall family suspect. To this day many commercial heraldic outlets continue to pass the traditional arms of the O'More family of Laois, which are "Vert a lion rampant or in chief three mullets of the last", off as those of Mulcahy when there is clearly no connection between the two families.

== Chieftainship ==
No reliable source exists which names any Chiefly line for this sept. Therefore, any modern claimants to such a title would be highly questionable. As the family has an ecclesiastical origin, any Chiefly line would most likely be associated with the holding of a particular church title over several generations. Unlike the greater political dynasties whose power came from mainly land and cattle ownership, ecclesiastical lineages relied manly on income from these benefices to grow their influence and standing.

An individual had recently come forward claiming Chiefly status by means of ad hoc Derbfine, however in a statement issued on the website of The Clan Mulcahy Association, the individual in question declared that he no longer wishes to claim the position, citing dissatisfaction with the authenticity of the 'ad hoc' system. The Uí Mhaolchatha sept has no reliably recorded Chiefly lineages. However the individual in question does claim descent from the County Kerry branch and ultimately from Giolla Moenaigh Ó Maolchatha, the earliest recorded bearer of the name.

                          POSSIBLE CHIEFLY LINE OF THE UÍ MHAOLCHATHA KERRY BRANCH
                                                     ...
                                                Giolla Moenaig
                                    Keeper of the Island of Innisfallen
                                                   1317 AD
                                                       |
                                                       |
                                                Giolla na Naomh
                                      = Niamh Dau. of Y Chwoma (Uí Chiabhaigh)
                                                    1401 AD
                                                       |
                                                       |
                                           Thomas, Vicar of Killarney
                                  First record of the Vicarage in the family
                                                    1426 AD
                                                       |
                                                       |
                                                 Thady (Tadhg),
                                         Vicar of Killarney and Aghadoe,
                                    Rector of Kyllmicluym (Drishane parish)
                                                    1473 AD
                                                       |
                                                       |
                                       — — — — — — — — — — — — — — — — — —
                                      |                                   |
                                     John                               Thomas
                    John and Thomas (Possibly brothers) both claimed the Vicarage of Killarney in 1480.
                             Thomas was said to have claimed the office without proper cause.
                           John was granted the Vicarage by Papal decree however it seems John
                              would not dare meet with Thomas for fear of violence.[12]

== Heraldry ==
It is a common misconception that coats of arms were used to identify families. They were in fact personal property of individuals. It is therefore possible for multiple coats of arms to exist under the same surname. However, in the case of Mulcahy, no bearer of the surname has ever registered a coat of arms with any Irish heraldic authority in medieval times. No heraldic symbols can be authentically associated with the family.

The Mulcahy Association has adopted the symbol of a yew tree as their emblem. The yew, according to the organisation, is closely associated with early church sites as well as having important meaning for the Gaelic Irish.

== Places ==
- Ballyogaha (Baile Uí gCathaigh), in County Cork, which may or may not have had some connection with the family
- Mulcahy Middle School, a middle school in the San Joaquin Valley in California
- Mulcahy Stadium, a baseball stadium in Anchorage, Alaska

== Persons ==
- Anne M. Mulcahy (born 1952), American businesswoman, chairman and CEO of Xerox
- Colm Mulcahy (born 1958), Irish mathematician, academic, columnist and author
- Dan Mulcahy (1882–1953), Australian politician
- Denis Mulcahy (born 1956), Irish hurling player
- Edward Mulcahy (disambiguation), several people
  - Edward Mulcahy (State Department official), deputy to Assistant United States Secretary of State Nathaniel Davis
  - Edward Mulcahy (politician) (1850–1927), Irish-born Australian politician in Tasmania
  - Edward W. Mulcahy (1921–2006), American diplomat and ambassador
- Francis P. Mulcahy (1894–1973), United States Marine Corps general and commander during World War II.
- Geoffrey Mulcahy (born 1942), British businessman with Kingfisher plc
- Hugh Mulcahy (1913–2001), American professional baseball player
- John Mulcahy (1876–1942), American Olympic double scull rower in the 1904 Olympics
- John Joseph Mulcahy, American Roman Catholic bishop
- Kevin V. Mulcahy (born 1945), American professor and culture scholar
- Máire Mulcahy (1937–2023), Irish zoologist and ecologist
- Mark Mulcahy (contemporary), American jangle-pop musician in the 1980–90s
- Michael Mulcahy (born 1952), Irish expressionist painter
- Michael Mulcahy (born 1960), Irish Fianna Fáil party politician
- Niamh Mulcahy (born 1990), Irish camogie and soccer player
- Noel Mulcahy (1929–2019), Irish Fianna Fáil politician
- Pat Mulcahy (born 1975), Irish hurling player
- Richard Mulcahy (1886–1971), Irish politician, leader of Fine Gael and Cabinet Minister; Chief of Staff of the IRA
- Rosemarie Mulcahy (1942–2012), Irish academic and author
- Russell Mulcahy (born 1953), Australian film director
- Tomás Mulcahy (born 1963), Irish hurling player

Fictional person

- Father Mulcahy, American character in the U.S. film and television show M*A*S*H

== See also ==
- Mulcahy-Redmond & Co.
