= Dave Bolen =

American athlete and diplomat (1923–2022)

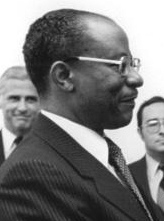
- Bolen in 1979

United States Ambassador to East Germany
- In office August 22, 1977 – June 20, 1980
- President: Jimmy Carter
- Preceded by: John Sherman Cooper
- Succeeded by: Herbert S. Okun

United States Ambassador to Lesotho
- In office April 25, 1974 – August 11, 1976
- President: Richard Nixon; Gerald Ford
- Preceded by: Charles J. Nelson
- Succeeded by: Donald R. Norland

United States Ambassador to Swaziland
- In office April 22, 1974 – August 11, 1976
- President: Richard Nixon; Gerald Ford
- Preceded by: Charles J. Nelson
- Succeeded by: Donald R. Norland

United States Ambassador to Botswana
- In office April 11, 1974 – August 11, 1976
- President: Richard Nixon; Gerald Ford
- Preceded by: Charles J. Nelson
- Succeeded by: Donald R. Norland

Personal details
- Born: David Benjamin Bolen; December 23, 1923 Heflin, Louisiana, U.S.
- Died: December 10, 2022 (aged 98) Scottsdale, Arizona, U.S.
- Spouse: Betty L. Gayden (m. 1949)
- Children: 3
- Education: Southern University; University of Colorado Boulder; Harvard University

Military service
- Allegiance: United States
- Branch/service: Army Air Corps
- Years of service: 1943–1946

David Benjamin Bolen (December 23, 1923 – December 10, 2022) was an American track and field athlete, Olympian, diplomat and businessman.

== Biography ==
Bolen competed at the 1948 Summer Olympics in the 400 metres. He finished fourth in the final behind Arthur Wint, Herb McKenley and Mal Whitfield. In 2012, Bolen told The Boulder Daily Camera that "The Olympics is not something you train for. You have to have talent, world-class talent. You have to use that talent for the benefit of yourself and others." Bolen first discovered that he had that talent when he raced other children during an Easter egg hunt during his childhood and found that he was faster. He later decided he wanted to use his "foot speed" to gain a college education.

Bolen graduated from the University of Colorado Boulder in 1950, and was the university's first Olympic athlete. Before serving for two years in the Army Air Force in WWII, he attended Southern University in New Orleans; after his service, he was recruited by CU Boulder track and field coach Frank Potts.

Later, Bolen's career took him to the US State Department. In 1974, President Richard Nixon appointed him ambassador to Swaziland, Lesotho and Botswana simultaneously, while keeping residence in Gaborone. In 1977, the German-speaking Bolen was appointed by President Jimmy Carter and confirmed as US Ambassador to the German Democratic Republic. He was the first African-American to serve as ambassador to a nation behind the Iron Curtain. He served until 1980. As an ambassador to East Germany, Bolen helped to lay the groundwork for the destruction of the Berlin Wall. On November 9, 1989, the day the wall came down, Bolen's daughter, Cynthia, was photographed handing a long-stemmed rose to an East German border guard standing atop the wall. He also worked to help free Nelson Mandela from prison.

Bolen died on December 10, 2022, at the age of 98.

== Competition record ==
Year	Competition	Venue	Position	Event	Notes
Representing United States
1948	Olympics	London, United Kingdom	4th	400 m	47.2

Diplomatic posts
Preceded by Charles J. Nelson	United States Ambassador to Botswana; 1974–1976	Succeeded by Donald R. Norland
Preceded by Charles J. Nelson	United States Ambassador to Lesotho; 1974–1976	Succeeded by Donald R. Norland
Preceded by Charles J. Nelson	United States Ambassador to Swaziland; 1974–1976	Succeeded by Donald R. Norland
