= Alexander M. Laskaris =

American diplomat (born 1967)

Alexander Laskaris
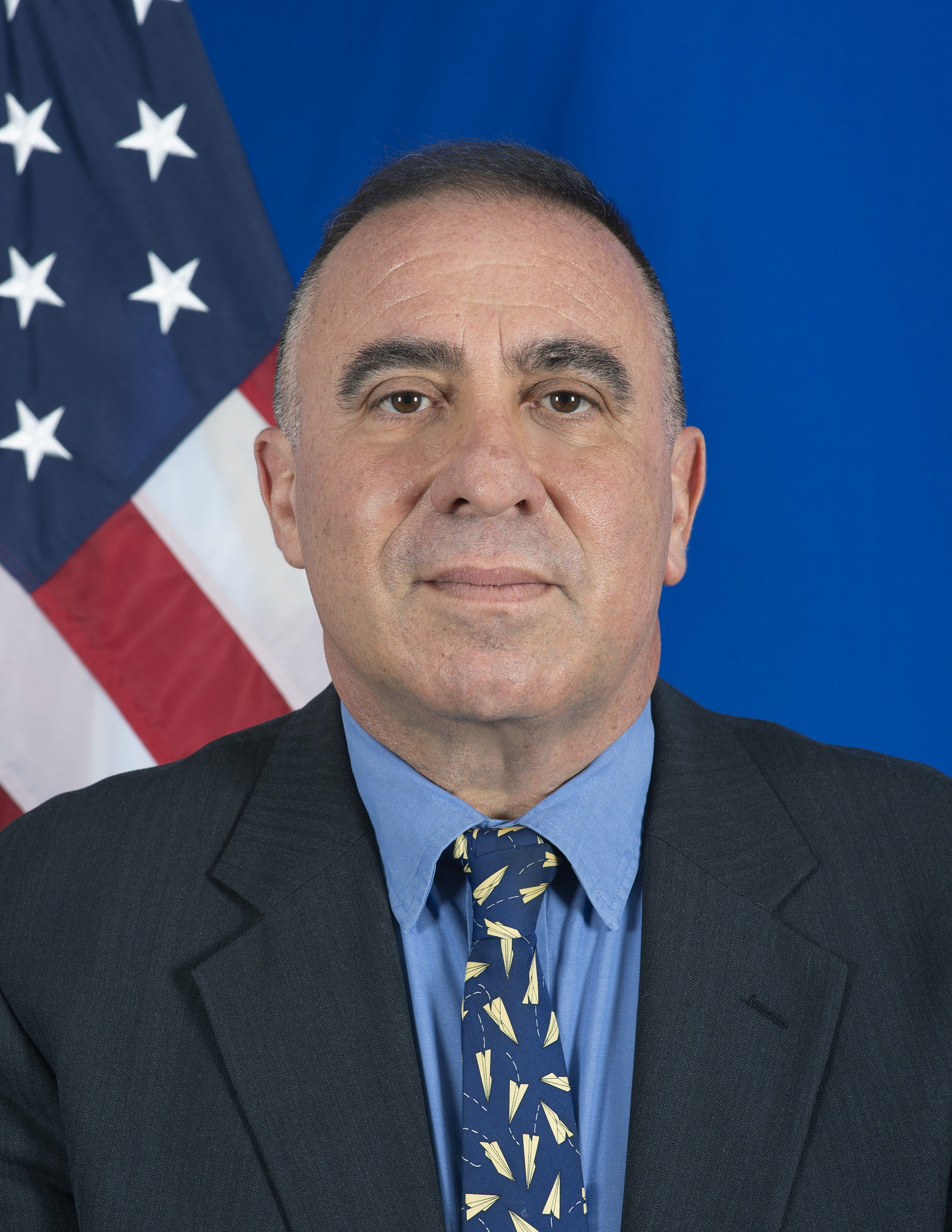

United States Ambassador to Chad
- In office August 18, 2022 – February 28, 2025
- President: Joe Biden; Donald Trump
- Preceded by: Geeta Pasi
- Succeeded by: Rick Swart (chargé d'affaires a.i.)

United States Ambassador to Guinea
- In office August 3, 2012 – November 10, 2015
- President: Barack Obama
- Preceded by: Patricia Moller
- Succeeded by: Dennis B. Hankins

Personal details
- Born: Alexander Mark Laskaris; 1967 (age 58–59) Monterey, California, U.S.
- Education: Georgetown University (BA); United States Army War College (MSS)

Alexander Mark Laskaris (born 1967) is an American diplomat who served as the United States ambassador to Chad from August 2022 to February 2025. He also served as the United States ambassador to Guinea from 2012 to 2015. Laskaris was the faculty leader in the National War College at the National Defense University.

== Early life and education ==
Laskaris was born in Monterey, California in 1967. He earned a Bachelor of Arts in international politics from the Walsh School of Foreign Service at Georgetown University and a Master of Strategic Studies from the United States Army War College.

== Career ==
Before joining the Foreign Service, Laskaris was an English and math teacher at St. Boniface High School in Galeshewe, Northern Cape in South Africa.

Laskaris joined the United States Foreign Service in 1991 and was first posted to Monrovia, Liberia as vice-consul, during the ongoing Civil War. In 1993, Laskaris was posted to Gaborone, Botswana as political and economic officer, staying there for two years before serving as desk officer for Rwanda and Burundi. In 1997, Laskaris was assigned to the U.S. Embassy in Luanda, Angola to serve as a political counselor.

In 1999, Laskaris was recalled to work at the United States Department of State, first as an advisor on the U.S. Mission to the United Nations, working under Richard Holbrooke, and then, in 2001, as part of Secretary of State Colin Powell's Policy Planning Staff.

Laskaris returned to Africa in 2003 to be deputy chief of mission at the embassy in Bujumbura, Burundi and in 2006, took up the same post in Pristina, Kosovo, serving there during the international talks led by UN envoy Martti Ahtisaari.

In 2008, Laskaris was appointed team leader for the Provincial Reconstruction Team in Mosul, Iraq. From the summer of 2009 until his next appointment in 2010, Laskaris took a course in Kurdish. In 2010 he was given the job of consul general in the consulate in Erbil, Iraq.

In January 2016, Laskaris joined the United States Africa Command as deputy to Commander Thomas D. Waldhauser. In July 2019, he began leading seminars at the National War College as a faculty member.

=== Ambassador to Guinea ===
On May 24, 2012, President Barack Obama nominated Laskaris to be the next U.S. ambassador to Guinea. Hearings on his nomination were held by the Senate Foreign Relations Committee on July 12, 2012. The committee favorably reported his nomination on July 26, 2012. He was confirmed by the Senate on August 2, 2012, and presented his credentials in September 2012. Laskaris left the post on November 10, 2015.

=== Ambassador to Chad ===
In January 2022, Laskaris was nominated by President Joe Biden to serve as the United States ambassador to Chad. Hearings on his nomination were held before the Senate Foreign Relations Committee on May 10, 2022. The committee favorably reported his nomination to the Senate floor on May 18, 2022. On July 14, 2022, his nomination was confirmed by voice vote. He presented his credentials to Mahamat Déby, the President of the Transitional Military Council, on August 18, 2022. He left his post on February 27, 2025.

== Personal life ==
Laskaris speaks French, Albanian, Greek, Spanish, Kurdish, Soussou, Portuguese and studied Chadian Arabic.

Diplomatic posts
Preceded by Patricia Moller	United States Ambassador to Guinea; 2012–2015	Succeeded by Dennis B. Hankins
Preceded by Jessica Davis Ba; Chargé d'Affaires	United States Ambassador to Chad; 2022–2025	Succeeded by Rick Swart chargé d'affaires a.i.
