= Butler family =

Butler family may refer to:

- Butler dynasty, a noble family in Ireland
- Butler-Belmont family, a family of United States politicians
- Butler family (Artemis Fowl), a family in the Artemis Fowl teen novel series
- Butler (surname), people with the surname Butler
