= Edward Mulcahy =

Edward Mulcahy may refer to:

- Edward Mulcahy (State Department official), deputy to Assistant United States Secretary of State Nathaniel Davis
- Edward Mulcahy (politician) (1850–1927), Irish-born Australian politician in Tasmania
- Edward W. Mulcahy (1921–2006), American diplomat and ambassador
