= Jay Pierrepont Moffat =

American diplomat

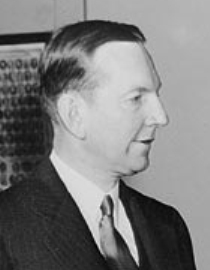

7th United States Ambassador to Canada
- In office June 13, 1940 – January 25, 1943
- President: Franklin Delano Roosevelt
- Preceded by: James H. R. Cromwell
- Succeeded by: Ray Atherton

Personal details
- Born: January 7, 1896 Rye, New York, United States
- Died: January 25, 1943 (aged 47) Ottawa, Ontario, Canada
- Spouse: Lilla Cabot Grew (m. 1927)
- Relations: Abbot Low Moffat (brother); John Campbell White (brother-in-law)
- Parent(s): Reuben Burnham Moffat; Ellen Low Pierrepont
- Education: Groton School; Harvard University
- Profession: Diplomat

Jay Pierrepont Moffat (January 7, 1896 – January 25, 1943) was an American diplomat, historian and statesman who, between 1917 and 1943, served the State Department in a variety of posts, including that of United States Ambassador to Canada during the first year of U.S. participation in World War II.

== Background ==
Moffat was born on January 7, 1896, in Rye, New York. He was the son of Reuben Burnham Moffat and Ellen Low (née Pierrepont) Moffat.

His younger brother was Abbot Low Moffat (1901–1996), a member of New York State Assembly from New York County from 1929 to 1943. His sister, Elizabeth Barclay Moffat (1898–1993), was married to John Campbell White (1884–1967), the United States Ambassador to Haiti and Peru. His niece, Margaret Rutherfurd White, was married to William Tapley Bennett Jr. (1917–1994), the U.S. Ambassador to the Dominican Republic, Portugal, and NATO, in 1945.

Moffat was educated at the Groton School and attended Harvard University for two years, beginning in 1915.

== Career ==
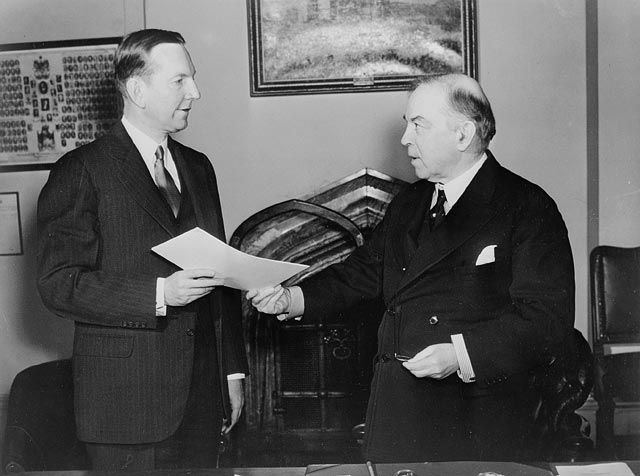
Pierrepont Moffat (left) with Canadian Prime Minister Mackenzie King

Moffat, a professional diplomat, served as the private secretary to the U.S. Ambassador to the Netherlands from 1917 until 1919. Following his service in the Netherlands, he was the secretary of the American legation in Warsaw from 1919 until 1921, and in Tokyo from 1921 to 1923.

Between 1925 and 1927, he served President Calvin Coolidge as Ceremony Officer at the White House and in 1927, at the end of his assignment, he was married to Lilla Cabot Grew, the daughter of fellow diplomat Joseph C. Grew. Moffat continued his diplomatic career in the post of secretary to the American legation in Bern, Switzerland, from 1927 to 1931, and as the U.S. Consul General to Australia from 1935 to 1937.

From 1937 to 1940, he again served in Washington, D.C., this time in the significant post of Chief of the State Department's Western European Division. Finally, in June 1940, after U.S. Ambassador to Canada James H. R. Cromwell resigned after 142 days to run for the U.S. Senate, President Franklin Roosevelt nominated Moffat to his first and, as it turned out, final post in an ambassadorial role as Envoy Extraordinary and Minister Plenipotentiary to Canada. He was immediately confirmed and served until his death, two years and seven months later, in the midst of World War II.

Following his death, he was succeeded by Ray Atherton. In his obituary, The New York Times remarked that "even in war, when death is knocking at such a multitude of doors, the loss of a trusted public man in the flower of his age and his powers is lamentable". In addition to his work as a diplomat, he wrote a work on Turkish history and, in 1956, his papers were donated to the Harvard University Library by his father-in-law Ambassador Joseph Grew.

== Personal life ==
In 1927, at the end of his assignment at the White House, he was married to Lilla Cabot Grew Moffat Levitt (1907–1994) in Hancock, New Hampshire. She was the daughter of Joseph Clark Grew, who was then the Under Secretary of State, and later, the U.S. Ambassador to Japan during the December 7, 1941, attack on Pearl Harbor, and Alice Perry Grew (b. 1884). Her maternal grandparents were Lilla Cabot Perry, the impressionist painter of the New England Cabots, and Thomas Sergeant Perry, the noted American scholar. Through her grandfather, she was a descendant of famed American naval hero Oliver Hazard Perry.

Together, Jay and Lilla were the parents of:

- Edith Alice Pierrepont Moffat (1929–2010), who married Donn Braden Spenser (1922–1986), the son of Loyal James Spenser and Mrs. Earl Hagen Foster, in 1949.
- Jay Pierrepont "Peter" Moffat, Jr. (1932–2020), was served as the United States Ambassador to Chad from 1983 to 1985. He married Pamela Mary Dawson, the daughter of Giles Dawson, in 1953.

Moffat died on January 25, 1943, in Ottawa, two and a half weeks after his 47th birthday, with complications from surgery for phlebitis. A service was held for Moffat at Christ Church Cathedral in Ottawa, which was attended by Prime Minister Mackenzie King and Sir Suldham Redfern, who represented the Earl of Athlone, Governor General of Canada.

Moffat was a lineal descendant of John Jay, negotiator of the Treaty of Paris, Secretary of Foreign Affairs and first U.S. Chief Justice.

== Official posts ==
- Secretary to the Legation at The Hague (1917–1919)
- Secretary to the Legation in Poland (1919–1921)
- Secretary to the Legation in Japan (1921–1923)
- Ceremony Officer at the White House (1925–1927)
- Secretary to the Legation in Switzerland (1927–1931)
- Chief of the Western European Division of the State Department (1932–1935)
- Consul General at Legation in Sydney, Australia (1935–1937)
- Chief of the Division of European Affairs at the State Department (1937–1940)
- United States Ambassador to Canada (1940–1943)
