= Butler-Belmont family =

The Butler-Belmont family is a family of politicians from the United States.

- William Butler 1759–1821, South Carolina State Representative 1787–1795, U.S. Representative from South Carolina 1801–1813.
  - William Butler 1790–1850, U.S. Representative from South Carolina 1841–1843. Son of William Butler.
  - Andrew Pickens Butler 1796–1857, South Carolina State Representative, South Carolina State Senator 1824–1833, Judge in South Carolina 1835–1846, U.S. Senator from South Carolina 1846–1857. Son of William Butler.
  - Pierce M. Butler 1798–1847, Governor of South Carolina 1836–1838. Son of William Butler.
  - Milledge Luke Bonham 1813–1890, U.S. Representative from South Carolina 1857–1860, Confederate Representative from South Carolina 1861–1862, Governor of South Carolina 1862–1864. First cousin once removed of William Butler.
    - Matthew Butler 1836–1909, South Carolina State Representative 1860 1866, candidate for Lieutenant Governor of South Carolina 1870, U.S. Senator from South Carolina 1877–1895. Son of William Butler.
    - James DeWolf Perry 1815–1876, delegate to the Republican National Convention 1868. First cousin of Matthew Butler.
    - August Belmont 1816–1890, U.S. Chargé d'Affaires to Netherlands 1853–1854, U.S. Minister to Netherlands 1854–1857, Chairman of the Democratic National Committee 1860–1868, delegate to Democratic National Convention 1860 1864 1876. First cousin of Matthew Butler.
    - M.L. Bonham, Adjutant General of South Carolina 1885–1890, Circuit Court Judge in South Carolina 1924–1930, Justice of the South Carolina Supreme Court 1931–1940, Chief Justice of the South Carolina Supreme Court 1940. Son of Milledge Luke Bonham.
      - Perry Belmont 1851–1947, U.S. Representative from New York 1881–1888, U.S. Minister to Spain 1888–1889, delegate to the Democratic National Convention 1892 1896 1900 1904 1912. Son of August Belmont.
      - August Belmont Jr. 1853–1924, delegate to the Democratic National Convention 1912. Son of August Belmont.
      - Oliver Belmont 1958-1908, delegate to the Democratic National Convention 1900, U.S. Representative from New York 1901–1903. Son of August Belmont.
      - Joseph C. Grew (1880–1965), U.S. Minister to Denmark 1920–1921, U.S. Minister to Switzerland 1921–1924, U.S. Ambassador to Turkey 1927–1932, U.S. Ambassador to Japan 1932–1938. Nephew by marriage of August Belmont.
        - Jay Pierrepont Moffat (1896–1943), U.S. Consul General in Sydney 1935–1937; U.S. Minister to Canada 1940–1943; U.S. Minister to Luxembourg 1941–1943. Son-in-law of Joseph C. Grew.
        - Cecil B. Lyon (1903–1993), U.S. Vice Consul in Havana, Cuba 1931; U.S. Vice Consul in Hong Kong, China 1932; U.S. Consul in Tianjin, China 1938; U.S. Ambassador to China 1956–1958; U.S. Ambassador to Ceylon 1964–1967; U.S. Ambassador to the Maldive Islands 1965. Son-in-law of Joseph C. Grew.
          - Jay P. Moffat (1932–2020), U.S. Ambassador to Chad 1983–1985. Son of Jay Pierrepont Moffat.
          - William Tapley Bennett Jr. (1917–1994), U.S. Ambassador to the Dominican Republic 1964–1966, U.S. Ambassador to Portugal 1966–1969. Nephew by marriage of Jay Pierrepont Moffat.

NOTE: Milledge Luke Bonham was also cousin of U.S. Representative Preston S. Brooks. Matthew Butler was also son-in-law of U.S. Representative Francis W. Pickens. James DeWolf Perry was also great-grandson of U.S. Senator William Bradford and grandson of U.S. Senator James De Wolf. Jay Pierrepont Moffat was also great-grandnephew of New York City Mayor Seth Low, nephew of Connecticut State Representative Seth Low Pierrepont, brother of New York Assemblyman Abbot Low Moffat, and brother-in-law of U.S. Ambassador John Campbell White.

== See also ==
- Perry family
- List of United States political families
