= Christopher E. Goldthwait =

American diplomat

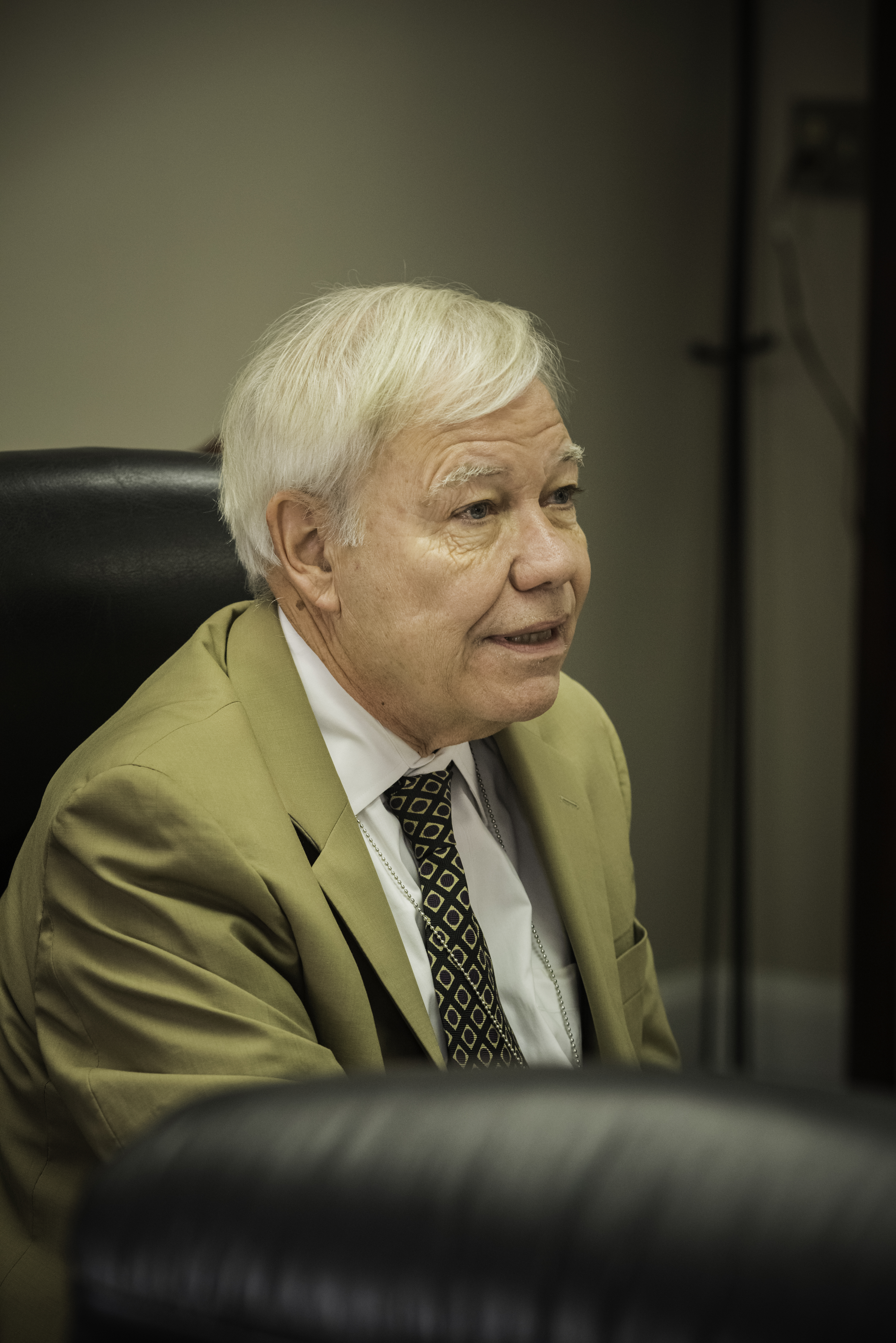
- Christopher Goldthwait in 2016

18th United States Ambassador to Chad
- In office October 10, 1999 – January 16, 2004
- President: Bill Clinton; George W. Bush
- Preceded by: David C. Halsted
- Succeeded by: Marc M. Wall

Personal details
- Born: 1949 (age 76–77) Georgia
- Profession: Diplomat

Christopher E. Goldthwait (born 1949) is an American diplomat. He was the United States Ambassador to Chad from October 10, 1999 to January 2004.

== Biography ==
Goldthwait was born in Georgia in 1949. He was raised in Illinois, New York, and California. He graduated from Harvard University and later joined the U.S. Foreign Service. Goldthwait's parents are Elizabeth Virginia Benefield Goldthwait (born c. 1918, died August 16, 2002) and John T. Goldthwait.

=== Agriculture ===
He served in many agricultural duties and was in the Foreign Agricultural Service (FAS) for many of his posts. He worked at the United States Department of Agriculture from 1973 to 1978. From 1978 to 1982, he worked in Bonn, Germany as a staff member for the FAS. He served FAS positions in Lagos, Nigeria as Chief of the FAS office there from 1982 to 1986, and in Washington D.C. as Deputy Director of the Grains Division from 1986 to 1988, Deputy Assistant Administrator for International Statistics in 1988, Assistant Administrator for Export Credits/Acting General Sales Manager from 1988 to 1993, and as General Sales Manager for Export Credits from 1993 to 1999.

=== Ambassador ===
On July 7, 1999, Goldthwait was nominated by President Bill Clinton to be the United States Ambassador to Chad. He was confirmed on October 10, 1999, and remained in that post until January 16, 2004, when he was succeeded by Marc M. Wall.

Diplomatic posts
Preceded by David C. Halsted	United States Ambassador to Chad; 1999–2004	Succeeded by Marc M. Wall
