= Abbot Low Moffat =

American politician

Member of the New York State Assembly for New York County, 15th District
- In office 1929–1943
- Preceded by: Samuel H. Hofstadter
- Succeeded by: John R. Brook

Personal details
- Born: May 12, 1901 Upper East Side, Manhattan, New York, U.S.
- Died: April 17, 1996 (aged 94) Hightstown, New Jersey, U.S.
- Cause of death: Cancer
- Party: Republican
- Relatives: Jay Pierrepont Moffat (brother); Jay Pierrepont Moffat Jr. (nephew)
- Education: Harvard University; Columbia Law School

Abbot Low Moffat (May 12, 1901 – April 17, 1996) was an American lawyer, politician and diplomat from New York.

== Life and career ==
Moffat was born on May 12, 1901, on the Upper East Side of Manhattan. He graduated from Harvard University in 1923, and from Columbia Law School in 1926. He then traveled around Asia and Australia for some time, and became interested in history and geography. He was admitted to the bar in 1927 and practiced law in New York City. He also entered politics as a Republican.

He was a member of the New York State Assembly (New York Co., 15th D.) from 1929 to 1943. He was Chairman of the Committee on the Affairs of New York City in 1934, and Chairman of the Committee on Ways and Means from 1936 to 1943. He was a delegate to the New York State Constitutional Convention of 1938. He proposed, and then sponsored legislation, to build the New York State Thruway.

Moffat resigned his seat on August 16, 1943, to accept a post at the U.S. Department of State. He headed the department's South-East Asia Division from 1944 to 1947, then served in a variety of diplomatic posts: from 1947 to 1948 in Greece, from 1948 to 1950 in Great Britain, from 1950 to 1952 in Burma, and from 1957 to 1960 in Ghana. From 1954 to 1956, he worked for the International Bank for Reconstruction and Development.

In 1961, Moffat retired from the diplomatic service and moved to Princeton, New Jersey. That same year, he published a biography of King Mongkut of Siam.

He died on April 17, 1996, at a retirement home in Hightstown, New Jersey, of cancer. Ambassador Jay Pierrepont Moffat (1896–1943) was his brother, and Ambassador Jay Pierrepont Moffat Jr. (born 1932) is his nephew.

New York State Assembly
Preceded by Samuel H. Hofstadter	New York State Assembly; New York County, 15th District; 1929–1943	Succeeded by John R. Brook
Preceded by Meyer Alterman	New York State Assembly; Chairman of the Committee on Ways and Means; 1936–1943	Succeeded by D. Mallory Stephens
