= Jay Pierrepont Moffat Jr. =

American diplomat (1932–2020)

12th United States Ambassador to Chad
- In office May 27, 1983 – July 23, 1985
- President: Ronald Reagan
- Preceded by: Donald R. Norland
- Succeeded by: John Blane

Personal details
- Born: January 17, 1932 New York City, New York
- Died: October 23, 2020 (aged 88)
- Spouse: Pamela Mary Dawson
- Profession: Diplomat

Military service
- Branch/service: United States Army
- Years of service: 1953–1956

Jay Pierrepont "Peter" Moffat Jr. (January 17, 1932 – October 23, 2020) was an American diplomat. He served as the United States Ambassador to Chad from 1983 to 1985. He was the first ambassador to the newly reopened U.S. Embassy in N'Djamena. He was a member of the Butler-Belmont family.

== Biography ==
Jay (also known as Peter) Moffat was born in 1932. His father was the United States Ambassador to Canada, Jay Pierrepont Moffat and his grandfather was the United States Ambassador to Japan, Joseph Clark Grew who tried hard to avert the pacific stage of the World War II. He was also the grandnephew of Seth Low Pierrepont (member of Connecticut House of Representatives, 1921 to 1927) and nephew of Abbot Low Moffat (member of New York State Assembly from the New York County 15th District, 1929 to 1943). On December 28, 1953, Moffat married Pamela Mary Dawson. He graduated from Harvard University with an A.B. in 1953. Moffat served in the United States Army from 1953 to 1956. In 1956 he entered the U.S Foreign Service as intelligence research officer in the Bureau of Intelligence and Research. He was consular officer in Kobe and Osaka, Japan, from 1958 to 1960, and political officer in Paris, France, from 1961 to 1965. In the State Department, he served as officer in charge of Benelux affairs at the Bureau of European Affairs from 1965 to 1968, and staff assistant to the Secretary of State from 1968 to 1969. He was a political officer in Bern, Switzerland, from 1969 to 1970, and Deputy Chief of Mission in Port of Spain, Trinidad and Tobago from 1971 to 1974. In 1974, he attended the NATO Defense College in Rome, Italy. From 1974 to 1976 he was Deputy Executive Secretary in the State Department. He was Deputy Chief of Mission in Rabat, Morocco, from 1976 to 1980 and attended the Executive Seminar in National and International Affairs at the Foreign Service Institute from 1980 to 1981.

He was chargé d'affaires in N'Djamena, Chad, beginning in March 1982, taking over duties from John Blane, who had reopened the embassy that January. On April 28, 1983, he was nominated by President Ronald Reagan to be the United States Ambassador to Chad. He was promoted from chargé and confirmed on May 27, 1983. He left that post on July 23, 1985. He was, in turn, succeeded as Ambassador by his predecessor as chargé, John Blane.

He was a lineal descendant of Benjamin Franklin and John Jay, first US Chief Justice and negotiator of the Treaty of Paris, which formally ended the Revolutionary War and recognized the United States as a sovereign nation.

Moffat's foreign languages were French, German, and Russian.

== See also ==
- Butler-Belmont family

Diplomatic posts
Preceded by embassy reopened	United States Ambassador to Chad; 1983–1985	Succeeded by John Blane
