= John P. Blane =

American diplomat (1929–2012)

John Propst Blane

13th United States Ambassador to Chad
- In office September 2, 1985 – October 4, 1988
- President: Ronald Reagan
- Preceded by: Jay P. Moffat
- Succeeded by: Robert L. Pugh

7th United States Ambassador to Rwanda
- In office November 9, 1982 – July 16, 1985
- President: Ronald Reagan
- Preceded by: Harry R. Melone Jr.
- Succeeded by: John Edwin Upston

Personal details
- Born: July 15, 1929 Birmingham, Alabama, U.S.
- Died: April 13, 2012 (aged 82) Birmingham, Alabama, U.S.
- Spouse: Dianne Blane
- Education: University of Tennessee (BA, MA); University of Vienna; Northwestern University
- Profession: Diplomat

John Propst Blane (July 15, 1929 – April 13, 2012) was an American diplomat. He was the Principal Officer and Chargé d'Affaires ad interim to the Republic of Chad at the U.S. Embassy in N'Djamena in 1982, following the Embassy's closing in 1980. He was the United States Ambassador to Rwanda from 1982 to 1985 and Chad from September 1985 to October 1988.

== Biography ==
Blane was born in 1929 in Birmingham, Alabama. He graduated from the University of Tennessee with a B.A. in 1951 and an M.A. in 1956. He attended the University of Vienna from 1952 to 1953. He served in the United States Army from 1953 to 1955. He joined the U.S. Foreign Service in 1956. He soon became vice consul in Mogadishu, Somalia, in 1957, in Asmara, Eritrea, from 1958 to 1960), and in Salzburg, Austria, from 1960 to 1962). He later attended Northwestern University from 1962 to 1963. He was a political officer in Yaoundé, Cameroon, from 1963 to 1966. He returned to the State Department as a country officer for Togo, Dahomey (now Benin), Chad, and Gabon from 1966 to 1968. He was acting director of Research for Northern and Eastern Africa in the Bureau of Intelligence and Research from 1968 to 1969. Blane was Deputy Chief of Mission in Fort Lamy (now N'Djamena), Chad, from 1969 to 1972. From 1973 to 1975, he was the Director of Inter-African Affairs in the State Department. He was the Director of Bilateral Programs Division of the Office of International Activities at the Environmental Protection Agency from 1975 to 1977. He became Deputy Chief of Mission in Nairobi, Kenya, from 1977 to 1980. From 1980 to 1981, Blane was a member of the executive seminar in national and international affairs at the Foreign Service Institute. He was a member of the United States delegation to the 36th Session of the United Nations General Assembly in New York City in 1981.

Blane was the Chargé d'Affaires in N'Djamena, Chad, in 1982, following the reopening of the U.S. Embassy there. He was then appointed as United States Ambassador to the Republic of Rwanda September 30, 1982. He left that post on July 16, 1985. On July 19, 1985, Blane was nominated to be the United States Ambassador to Chad, and on September 2, 1985, Blane became the Ambassador. He served during the Libya-Chad conflict. He left that post on October 4, 1988.

Blane's foreign languages were German and French. He was married to Dianne Blane (Metzger), and had two children.

Blane died April 13, 2012, at his home in Birmingham, Alabama.
