= David C. Halsted =

American diplomat

David Crane Halsted

17th United States Ambassador to Chad
- In office September 12, 1996 – August 6, 1999
- President: Bill Clinton
- Preceded by: Laurence Pope
- Succeeded by: Christopher E. Goldthwait

5th United States Ambassador to Uganda
- In office July 18, 1979 – 1980
- President: Jimmy Carter
- Preceded by: Thomas Patrick Melady
- Succeeded by: Gordon Robert Beyer

Personal details
- Born: September 7, 1941 (age 84) Plainfield, New Jersey USA
- Party: Nonpartisan
- Spouse: Michele Ann Vautrain
- Profession: Diplomat

David Crane Halsted (born 1941) is an American diplomat. He served as the United States Ambassador to Chad from 1996 to 1999.

== Biography ==
Halsted was born in Plainfield, New Jersey on September 7, 1941. His mother was Katharine Patterson Halsted and his father was Osborne Halsted. Halsted attended Deerfield Academy and graduated from Dartmouth College in 1963. He graduated from George Washington University in 1968 and later joined the U.S. Foreign Service. On June 11, 1996, Halsted was nominated by President Bill Clinton to be the United States Ambassador to Chad. He was confirmed on September 12, 1996, and remained in that post until August 6, 1999.

On September 29, 1998, Halsted's mother died. Halsted also has three siblings, Margaret, Bayard and Alfred.

Diplomatic posts
Preceded by Thomas Patrick Melady	United States Ambassador to Uganda; 1979–1980	Succeeded by Gordon Robert Beyer
Preceded by Laurence Pope	United States Ambassador to Chad; 1996–1999	Succeeded by Christopher E. Goldthwait
