= Paul A. Folmsbee =

American diplomat (born 1960)

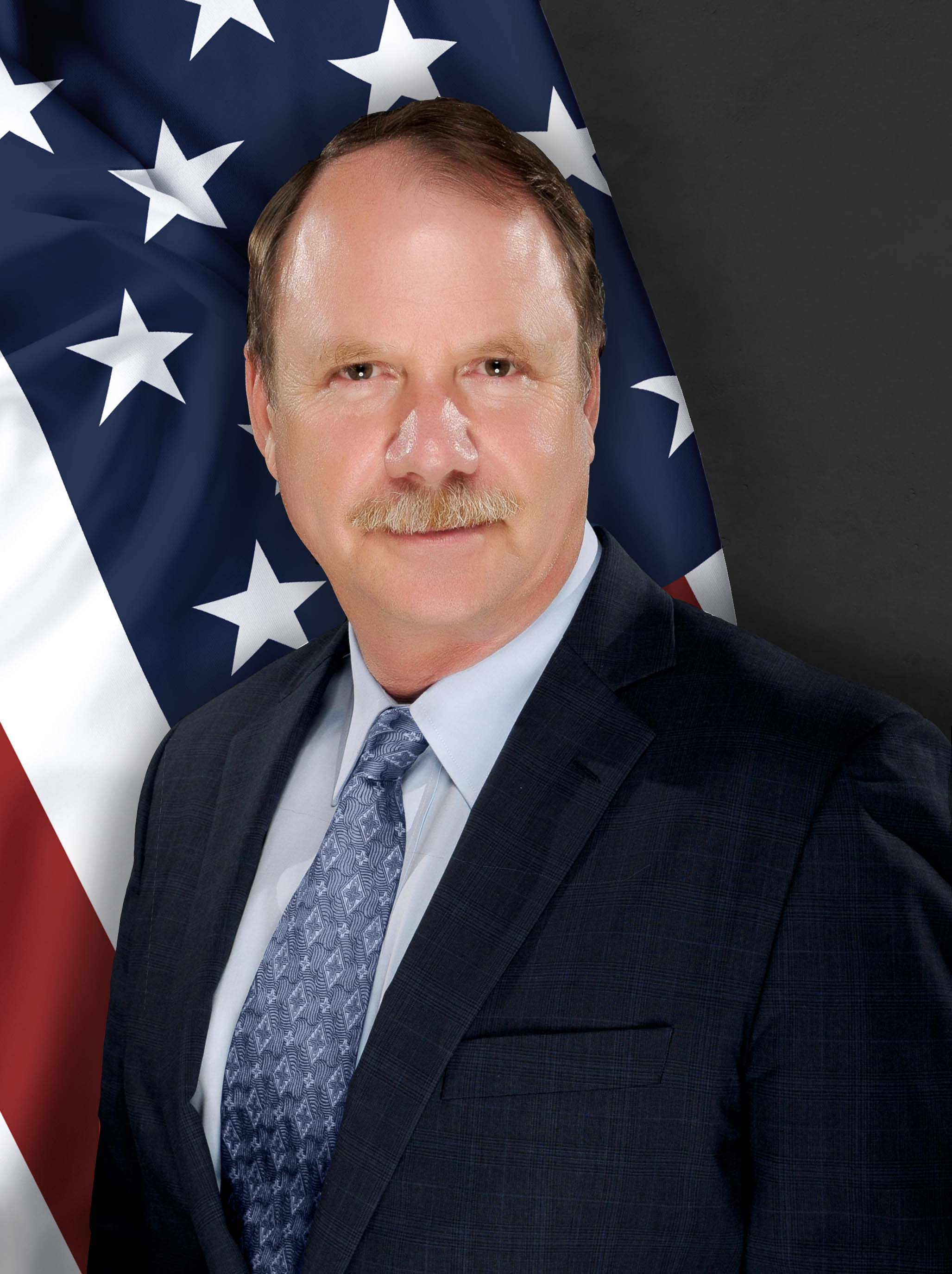

20th United States Ambassador to Mali
- In office May 23, 2015 – January 2, 2019
- President: Barack Obama; Donald Trump
- Preceded by: Mary Beth Leonard
- Succeeded by: Dennis B. Hankins

Personal details
- Born: Paul Folmsbee; June 3, 1960 (age 66) New York, United States

Paul A. Folmsbee (born June 3, 1960) is the former U.S. ambassador to Mali, serving under both the Obama administration and the Trump administration.

Folmsbee was nominated to be Ambassador to the Republic of Mali by President Barack Obama on September 18, 2014, and confirmed by the United States Senate on May 23, 2015.

== Career ==
Folmsbee is an American diplomat who has spent most of his career in the developing world and has served in many conflict zones including Afghanistan, Iraq, Pakistan, Haiti and Mali. He has specialised on economic and social development as well as civilian roles in conflict zones. In 2011–12 he served as the Senior Civilian Representative for Regional Command East, Afghanistan (embedded with the 1st Cavalry at Bagram), Consul General, Mumbai, India (2008–2011) during the period of the Mumbai terrorist attacks, and in 2007-8 as the Provincial Reconstruction Team Leader for Sadr City and Adhamiya, Iraq where he negotiated with representatives of Moqtada al Sadr while embedded with the US Army's 2/82 Airborne. He also served as the Embassy Director of counter narcotics and law enforcement programs in Pakistan (2006–7) and in Port-au-Prince, Haiti during a period a major unrest (2003–6) as well as earlier assignments in Sri Lanka, Bolivia, Kenya, Tanzania and Washington.

In Mali Ambassador Folmsbee has been critical of the signatories to the 2015 Algiers Accord, including the armed groups and the Government of Mali, and the failure by all to implement provisions of the accord. He has issued a number of statements calling for all sides to abide by the terms of a cease fire (ref: EMB Bamako Release 4/22/16; EMB Bamako Release 9/22/16) and to immediately conduct joint patrols, appoint interim authorities in the north and operationalize the joint security command centers.

Folmsbee earned a B.A. in political science from Tabor College in Hillsboro, Kansas, and an M.A. in social anthropology from the University of Oklahoma, Norman, Oklahoma. Born in New York, Folmsbee was raised in India and Mexico. He is the recipient of five Department of State Superior Honor Awards, five Meritorious Honor Awards and a medal from the Polish Government for service in Afghanistan working with Polish troops. He is married to Angelika Chin, who is from Jamaica. They have four grown children between them.
