= Donald R. Norland =

American diplomat (1924–2006)

10th United States Ambassador to Chad
- In office November 17, 1979 – March 24, 1980
- President: Jimmy Carter
- Preceded by: William G. Bradford
- Succeeded by: Jay P. Moffat

3rd United States Ambassador to Botswana
- In office February 23, 1978 – September 8, 1979
- President: Jimmy Carter
- Preceded by: David B. Bolen
- Succeeded by: Horace Dawson

3rd United States Ambassador to Swaziland
- In office February 23, 1978 – September 8, 1979
- President: Jimmy Carter
- Preceded by: David B. Bolen
- Succeeded by: Richard Cavins Matheron

3rd United States Ambassador to Lesotho
- In office February 23, 1978 – September 8, 1979
- President: Jimmy Carter
- Preceded by: David B. Bolen
- Succeeded by: John R. Clingerman

Personal details
- Born: June 14, 1924 Laurens, Iowa, United States
- Died: December 30, 2006 (aged 82) Washington, D.C., United States
- Profession: Diplomat

Donald Richard Norland (June 14, 1924 – December 30, 2006) was an American diplomat. He was the United States Ambassador to Botswana, Swaziland, Lesotho, and Chad.

== Biography ==
Donald Norland was born in Laurens, Iowa, and grew up on a family farm. His father was an educator and state legislator. He attended the University of Northern Iowa and joined the United States Navy during World War II. He served on patrol torpedo boats and minesweepers in the Pacific Ocean. After the war, he graduated from the University of Minnesota, with a master's degree in political science in 1950. He joined the U.S. Foreign Service in 1952 and began his career as a cultural affairs officer at the U.S. Embassy in Rabat, Morocco. He was chargé d'affaires to the newly independent nations of Niger, Dahomey (now Benin) and Upper Volta (now Burkina Faso) while consul general in Ivory Coast (also known as Côte d'Ivoire) in 1960. He served in the early 1960s as a political officer at the NATO headquarters, then in Paris, France. He was a political counselor in the Hague, Netherlands, from 1964 to 1969. He was later deputy chief of mission and chargé d'affaires in Conakry, Guinea.

From 1976 to 1979, while a resident at Gaborone, Norland served as the United States Ambassador to Botswana, Lesotho and Swaziland simultaneously. On November 17, 1979, Norland became the United States Ambassador to Chad. During the Libyan backed Chadian Civil War (1979-1982), N'Djamena was captured by the Transitional Government of National Unity, and diplomacy stopped. Norland and other diplomats were evacuated by French military forces to Cameroon in the summer of 1980, and Norland's ambassadorship had essentially ended. Norland retired from the foreign service in 1981, but he continued to lend his expertise on energy and telecommunications projects in Sudan, Nigeria and Chad. He worked with the Harvard Institute for International Development and the U.S. Chamber of Commerce to help economic development. From 1987 to 1989, he headed the training program on African studies at the State Department's Foreign Service Institute.

In later years he lived in Washington, D.C. He died in hospital on December 30, 2006, of a heart attack.

Diplomatic posts
Preceded by Dave Bolen	United States Ambassador to Botswana; 1976–1979	Succeeded by Horace Dawson
Preceded by William G. Bradford	United States Ambassador to Chad; 1979–1980	Succeeded by embassy closed
