= John A. Calhoun =

American diplomat

John Archibald Calhoun
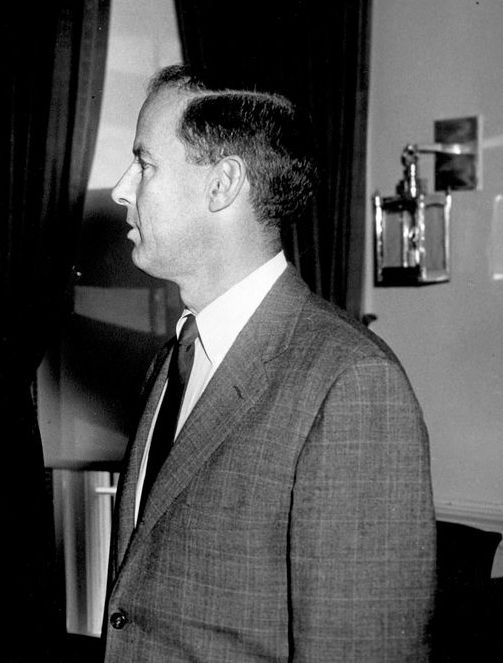

3rd United States Ambassador to Chad
- In office May 28, 1961 – April 1, 1963
- President: John F. Kennedy
- Preceded by: Frederic L. Chapin (ad interim)
- Succeeded by: Brewster H. Morris

5th United States Ambassador to Tunisia
- In office July 24, 1969 – May 31, 1972
- President: Richard Nixon
- Preceded by: Francis H. Russell
- Succeeded by: Talcott W. Seelye

Personal details
- Born: October 29, 1918 Berkeley, California; Alameda County
- Died: January 21, 2000 (81 years) San Rafael, California; Marin County
- Profession: Diplomat

Military service
- Branch/service: United States Navy
- Years of service: 1944–46
- Unit: Navy Supply Corps

John Archibald Calhoun (October 29, 1918 – January 21, 2000) was an American diplomat. He was the United States Ambassador to Chad from 1961 to 1963, as well as to Tunisia from 1969 to 1972.

== Biography ==
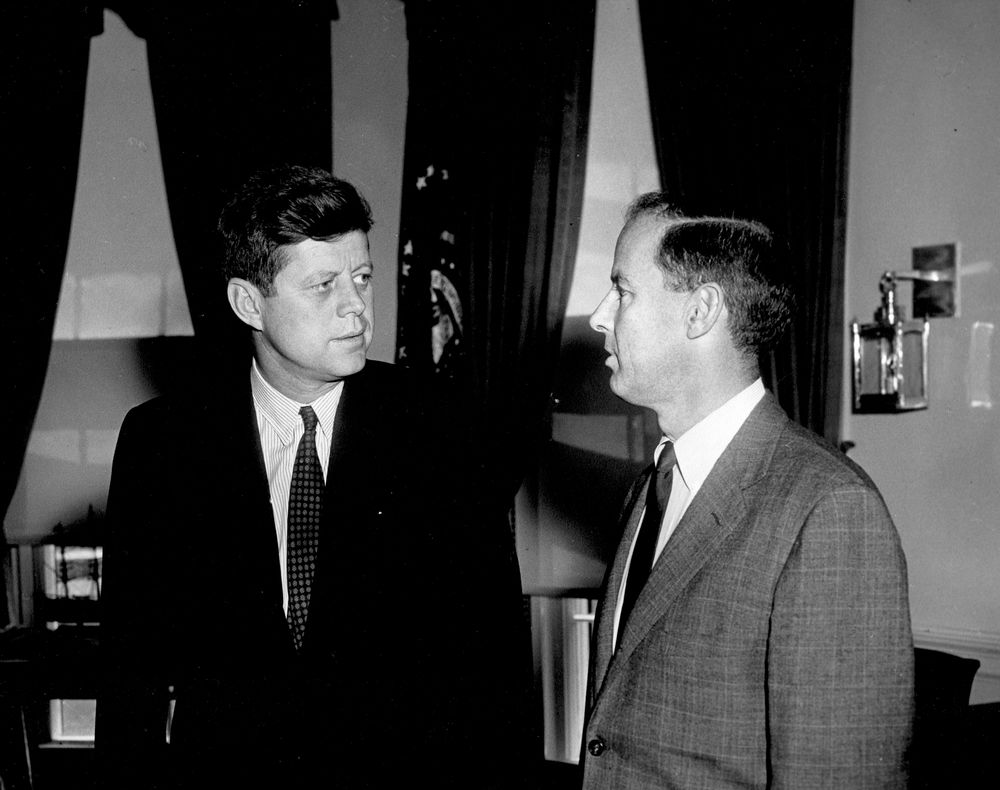
Calhoun with President John F. Kennedy in 1961

=== Early life and military career, 1918–1946 ===
John Archibald Calhoun was born on October 29, 1918, in Berkeley, Alameda County, California, the son of Dr. George Miller Calhoun and Ellinor McKay (Miller) Calhoun. His father was a professor of classics at the University of California, Berkeley. He graduated from the University of California, Berkeley in 1939 with a B.A. in International Relations and in 1940 from the Harvard University with a M.A. in history. He later joined the U.S Foreign Service in 1941, and became the U.S. Vice Consul in Tijuana, Mexico, in 1942. Later in that year, he was Vice Consul in Cairo, Egypt. From 1942 to 1944, he was posted in Tehran, Iran.

In 1944, Calhoun joined the U.S. Navy under the Supply Corps, and served until 1946. He attended the Naval School of Military Government at Princeton University and served in the U.S. Naval Military Government in Okinawa, Japan.

=== Career in State Department, 1941-1972 ===
In 1946, after Calhoun had left the Navy, he was the U.S. Political Advisor on German Affairs in Berlin, Germany, until 1949. From 1949 to 1952 he worked at the Department of State. From 1952 to 1955 he served in Seoul, South Korea. He attended the Air War College at Maxwell Air Force Base from 1955 to 1956. He served in Paris, France, with the U.S. Delegation to NATO, from 1956 to 1957. He was the Director of Executive Secretariat at the State Department from 1957 to 1960. He was a counselor for political affairs in Athens, Greece, from 1960 to 1961.

In 1961, President Kennedy nominated Calhoun to be the U.S. Ambassador to Chad, where he served from 1961 to 1963. In 1963, he was reassigned to Berlin as a Minister until 1966. He was Minister Counselor for Political Affairs in Saigon, South Vietnam, from 1967 to 1968, during the Tet Offensive On July 8, 1969, he was nominated by President Nixon to be the Ambassador to Tunisia, where he served from 1969 to 1972.

=== Retirement and later life, 1972-2000 ===
Calhoun retired in 1972, after 31 years in the Foreign Service, upon returning to San Francisco. He died on January 21, 2000, at the Marin General Hospital in San Rafael, California, of pneumonia and kidney failure. He was a resident of Mill Valley, California.

Diplomatic posts
Preceded by Frederic L. Chapin	United States Ambassador to Chad; 1961	Succeeded by Brewster H. Morris
Preceded by Francis H. Russell	United States Ambassador to Tunisia; 1969-1972	Succeeded by Talcott Williams Seelye
