= Richard Wayne Bogosian =

American diplomat

15th United States Ambassador to Chad
- In office August 4, 1990 – July 21, 1993
- President: George H. W. Bush
- Preceded by: Robert L. Pugh
- Succeeded by: Laurence Pope

10th United States Ambassador to Niger
- In office October 11, 1985 – August 7, 1988
- President: Ronald Reagan
- Preceded by: William Robert Casey, Jr.
- Succeeded by: Carl Copeland Cundiff

Personal details
- Born: July 18, 1937 (age 89) Boston, Massachusetts
- Party: Nonpartisan
- Profession: Diplomat

Richard Wayne Bogosian (born July 18, 1937) is an American diplomat. He was the United States Ambassador to Chad from 1990 to 1993 and Niger from 1985 to 1988.

== Biography ==
Bogosian was born in Boston, Massachusetts on July 18, 1937. He graduated from Tufts College with an A.B. in 1959 and the University of Chicago with a J.D. in 1962. He joined the U.S. Foreign Service in 1962. He oversaw many diplomatic posts, including at the Foreign Service Institute from 1962 to 1963, in the Bureau of Near Eastern and South Asian Affairs at the Department of State in 1963, at the U.S. Embassy in Baghdad, Iraq from 1963 to 1965, at the Foreign Service Institute again in 1965, as vice consul for the U.S. Embassy in Paris, France, from 1966 to 1968, in the Bureau of Near East and South Asian Affairs at the Department of State from 1968 to 1969, in the Bureau for Intelligence and Research at the Department of State from 1969 to 1971, and in the Foreign Service Institute for Economics in 1972.

He was chief of the economic section at the U.S. Embassy in Kuwait from 1972 to 1976, and Deputy Chief of Mission at the U.S. Embassy in Khartoum, Sudan, from 1976 to 1979. From 1976 to 1979, Bogosian was the chief of the Aviation Negotiations Division. He was the Director of East African Affairs from 1982 to 1985, and was nominated to be the United States Ambassador to Niger on August 1, 1985, by President Ronald Reagan. From 1988 to 1990 he was the Director of the Office of Monetary Affairs. In 1990, Bogosian became the United States Ambassador to Chad from 1990 to 1993. From 1993 to 1994, he was the Coordinator at the U.S. Liaison Office in Mogadishu, Somalia, and Coordinator for Rwanda and Burundi from 1996 to 1997, after the Rwandan genocide.

Bogosian speaks Arabic and French. He is married to Claire Marie Bogosian, and has three children.

Diplomatic posts
Preceded by William Robert Casey, Jr.	United States Ambassador to Niger; 1985–1988	Succeeded by Carl Copeland Cundiff
Preceded by Robert L. Pugh	United States Ambassador to Chad; 1990–1993	Succeeded by Laurence Everett Pope II
