= Brewster Morris =

American diplomat

Brewster Hillard Morris
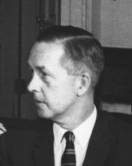

4th United States Ambassador to Chad
- In office August 12, 1963 – January 20, 1967
- President: John F. Kennedy
- Preceded by: John A. Calhoun
- Succeeded by: Sheldon B. Vance

Personal details
- Born: February 7, 1909 Bryn Mawr, Montgomery County, Pennsylvania
- Died: September 3, 1990 (aged 81) Tiburon, California
- Party: Nonpartisan
- Profession: Diplomat

Brewster Hillard Morris (February 7, 1909 – September 3, 1990) was an American diplomat. He was the United States Ambassador to Chad from 1963 to 1967.

== Biography ==
Morris was born in Bryn Mawr, Montgomery County, Pennsylvania, on February 7, 1909. He graduated from Haverford College in 1930 and later joined the U.S. Foreign Service. He served as Vice Consul in Montreal, Quebec, Canada (1938), and Stockholm, Sweden (1943). He also served in Berlin (before and after World War II), Moscow, London, Bonn, Montreal, Vienna, Dresden, and Frankfurt. In 1963, Morris was nominated to be the United States Ambassador to Chad by President Kennedy, and was confirmed on August 12, 1963. He served in that post until January 20, 1967. He later retired from the Foreign Service and died at his home in Tiburon, California, on September 3, 1990. He was 81 years old.

Diplomatic posts
Preceded by John A. Calhoun	United States Ambassador to Chad; 1963–1967	Succeeded by Sheldon B. Vance
