= Dennis B. Hankins =

American diplomat (born 1959)

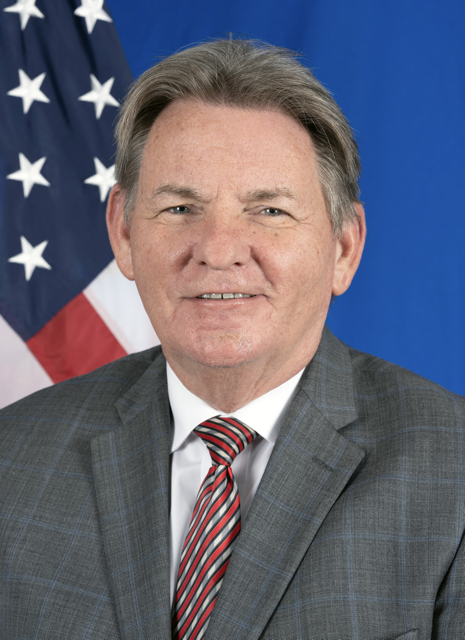

United States Ambassador to Haiti
- In office May 3, 2024 – June 11, 2025
- President: Joe Biden; Donald Trump
- Preceded by: Michele J. Sison (2021)

United States Ambassador to Mali
- In office March 15, 2019 – September 26, 2022
- President: Donald Trump; Joe Biden
- Preceded by: Paul Folmsbee
- Succeeded by: Rachna Korhonen

United States Ambassador to Guinea
- In office November 25, 2015 – January 29, 2019
- President: Barack Obama; Donald Trump
- Preceded by: Alexander M. Laskaris
- Succeeded by: Simon Henshaw

Personal details
- Born: 1959 (age 66–67)
- Spouse: Mira Hankins
- Children: Danu Hankins
- Education: Georgetown University, National War College

Dennis Bruce Hankins (born 1959) is an American diplomat who served as Ambassador of the United States of America to Haiti from 2024 to 2025. He previously served as the United States Ambassador to Mali between 2019 and 2022 and the United States Ambassador to Guinea between 2015 and 2019.

== Early life and education ==
Hankins earned a B.S.F.S. at Georgetown University and an M.S. at the National War College.

== Consular career ==
Hankins joined the Foreign Service in 1984. His first overseas postings were as vice-consul in Recife, Brazil and then in the U.S. Embassy in Thailand. In 1989, Hankins was posted to Sudan and then in 1992, given the job of consul in Haiti.

Four years later, Hankins was again posted to Africa to become the political and economic counselor in the Kinshasa embassy in the Democratic Republic of the Congo, working there during the First Congo War and, for a lesser time, the Second Congo War. He moved to be the political and economic counselor in Lisbon, Portugal in 1999, spending just two years in the job before returning to Africa to be the deputy chief of mission in Maputo, Mozambique.

In 2004, Hankins was appointed consul general in Riyadh, Saudi Arabia but was recalled to Washington to become the deputy director of the Office of Peacekeeping in the Bureau of International Organizations. He returned to Africa in 2007 to be deputy chief of mission in Nouakchott, Mauritania and, in 2010, returned to Khartoum, Sudan as the deputy chief of mission.

== Ambassadorships ==
=== Ambassador to Guinea ===
In 2012, Hankins was given the post of consul general in São Paulo, Brazil, staying in the post until his nomination as United States Ambassador to Guinea by President Obama on July 8, 2015. He was confirmed by the Senate on October 22 the same year.

=== Ambassador to Mali ===
On 13 August 2018, Donald Trump announced his intention to nominate Hankins to be the U.S. Ambassador to Mali. The nomination was tendered to the Senate on August 16, 2018, and he was confirmed on January 2, 2019. He presented his credentials to President Ibrahim Boubacar Keïta on March 15, 2019.

=== Ambassador to Haiti ===
On May 19, 2023, Joe Biden nominated Hankins to be the next ambassador to Haiti. His nomination was reported by the Senate Foreign Relations Committee on September 20, 2023 and confirmed by the full Senate on March 14, 2024. He arrived in Haiti on March 26, 2024. He presented his credentials on May 3, 2024.

== Personal life ==
Hankins has a wife, Mira, and a son, Danu, who works for the U.S. Navy. He speaks French, Portuguese, and Indonesian.

Diplomatic posts
Preceded by Alexander M. Laskaris	United States Ambassador to Guinea; 2015–2018	Succeeded by Simon Henshaw
Preceded by Paul Folmsbee	United States Ambassador to Mali; 2019–2022	Succeeded by Rachna Korhonen
Preceded by Michele J. Sison	United States Ambassador to Haiti; May 3, 2024 – June 11, 2025	Vacant
