= Edward S. Little =

American diplomat

Edward Southard Little

8th United States Ambassador to Chad
- In office December 7, 1974 – February 23, 1976
- President: Gerald Ford
- Preceded by: Edward W. Mulcahy
- Succeeded by: William G. Bradford

Personal details
- Born: July 20, 1918 Toledo, Ohio, U.S.
- Died: November 4, 2004 (aged 86) Alexandria, Virginia, U.S.
- Spouse: Marian Elizabeth McCarty
- Profession: Diplomat

Edward Southard Little (July 20, 1918 – November 4, 2004) was an American diplomat. He was the United States Ambassador to Chad from 1974 to 1976.

== Biography ==
Edward Little was born on July 20, 1918, in Toledo, Ohio, He was the son of Herbert Woodruff Little and Sara Marie (Southard) Little. He was a member of the Phi Kappa Psi fraternity and was also an economist. He married Marian Elizabeth McCarty on October 17, 1941, and later fought in the United States Navy in World War II. He later joined the U.S. Foreign Service. On October 3, 1974, President Gerald Ford nominated Little to be the United States Ambassador to Chad. He was confirmed on December 7, 1974, and remained in that post until February 23, 1976.

Edward Little died of cancer on November 4, 2004. He is interred at Arlington National Cemetery.

Diplomatic posts
Preceded by Edward W. Mulcahy	United States Ambassador to Chad; 1974–1976	Succeeded by William G. Bradford
