= Stephen W. Bosworth =

American academic and diplomat (1939-2016)

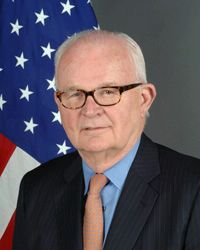

United States Special Representative for North Korea
- In office February 20, 2009 – October 26, 2011
- President: Barack Obama
- Preceded by: Office established
- Succeeded by: Glyn T. Davies

United States Ambassador to South Korea
- In office December 15, 1997 – February 10, 2001
- President: Bill Clinton; George W. Bush
- Preceded by: James T. Laney
- Succeeded by: Thomas C. Hubbard

United States Ambassador to the Philippines
- In office May 4, 1984 – April 2, 1987
- President: Ronald Reagan
- Preceded by: Michael Armacost
- Succeeded by: Nicholas Platt

13th Director of Policy Planning
- In office January 3, 1983 – April 7, 1984
- President: Ronald Reagan
- Preceded by: Paul Wolfowitz
- Succeeded by: Peter Rodman

United States Ambassador to Tunisia
- In office March 27, 1979 – June 22, 1981
- President: Jimmy Carter; Ronald Reagan
- Preceded by: Edward W. Mulcahy
- Succeeded by: Walter L. Cutler

Personal details
- Born: Stephen Warren Bosworth; December 4, 1939 Grand Rapids, Michigan, US
- Died: January 4, 2016 (aged 76) Boston, Massachusetts, US
- Spouse(s): Sandra De Puit (divorced) Christine Holmes (m. 1984)
- Children: 4
- Education: Dartmouth College (BA)
- Occupation: Academic, diplomat
- Awards: Order of the Rising Sun, Gold and Silver Star (Japan, 2005)

Stephen Warren Bosworth (December 4, 1939 – January 4, 2016) was an American academic and diplomat. He served as Dean of The Fletcher School at Tufts University and served as United States Special Representative for North Korea Policy from March 2009 to October 2011. He served three times as a U.S. Ambassador, to Tunisia (1979–1981), to the Philippines (1984–1987), and to South Korea (1997–2001). In 1987, he received the American Academy of Diplomacy's Diplomat of the Year Award.

In February 2009, U.S. Secretary of State Hillary Clinton named Bosworth a Special Representative for North Korea policy.

== Early life and education ==
Bosworth was born in Grand Rapids, Michigan in 1939. He graduated with a B.A. in international relations (1961) and an honorary doctorate (1986) from Dartmouth College. He was also a graduate student at George Washington University. He has two brothers, Brian Bosworth (head of the corporation FutureWorks) and Barry Bosworth (involved in advertisement).

== Private career ==
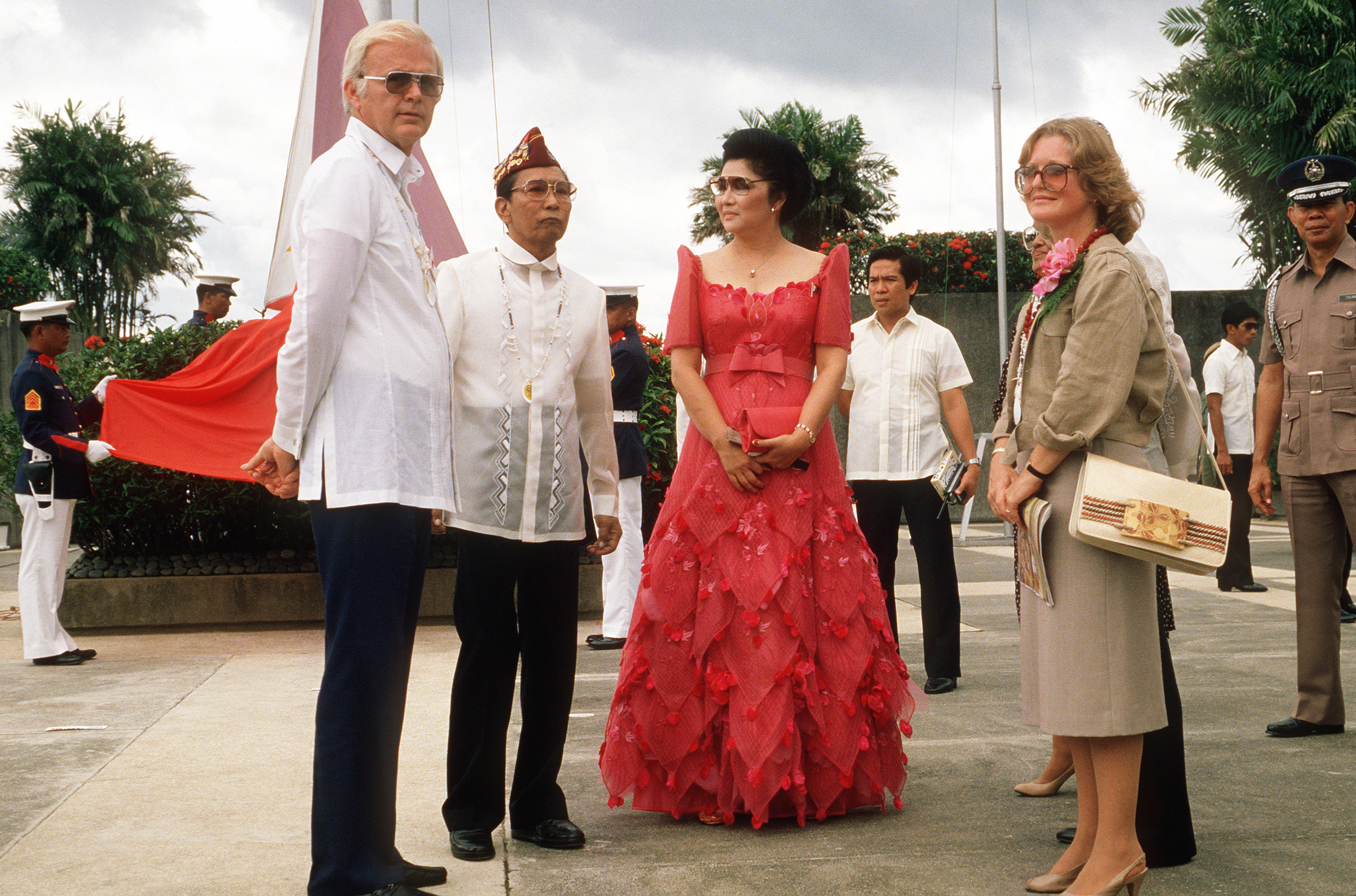
Ambassador Bosworth (left) and Mrs. Bosworth (far right) with Ferdinand and Imelda Marcos in Leyte in October 1984.

Prior to 1984, his previous foreign service assignments include Paris, Madrid, Panama City, and Washington, D.C. where he was the State Department's Director of Policy Planning, Principal Deputy Assistant Secretary for inter-American affairs, and Deputy Assistant Secretary for Economic Affairs.

He was a member of the International Board of Advisers for the President of the Philippines, and also a member of the boards of International Textile Group and Franklin Templeton Investment Trust Management Co. (Korea). He was a member of the Trilateral Commission.

At times he held teaching and oversight positions at various colleges and universities: Columbia University's School of International and Public Affairs (1990–1994); Linowitz Chair of International Studies, Hamilton College (1993); Trustee, Dartmouth College (1992–2002), Chairman of Board of Trustees, (1996–1999).

Before his appointment as ambassador to South Korea, he was the executive director of the Korean Peninsula Energy Development Organization (1995–1997). Before coming to KEDO, he was president of the United States Japan Foundation.

== Political career ==
He served on the executive committee of Americans Elect, a political party seeking to gain ballot access in every state in 2012.

== Personal life ==
Bosworth was married to Sandra De Puit, with whom he had a son and a daughter, but ended in a divorce. From 1984 until his death in 2016, he was married to Christine Holmes, from whom he had two stepchildren.

== Death ==
On January 4, 2016, Bosworth died at the age of 76 due to pancreatic cancer in Boston, Massachusetts.

== Writings ==
- Abramowitz, Morton I.; Stephen W. Bosworth (2006). Chasing the Sun: Rethinking East Asian Policy Since 1992. New York: Century Foundation. ISBN 978-0-87078-500-9.

Diplomatic posts
Preceded by Christopher R. Hill	U.S. Special Representative for North Korea Policy; 2009–2011	Succeeded by Glyn T. Davies
Preceded by James T. Laney	United States Ambassador to South Korea; 1997–2001	Succeeded by Thomas C. Hubbard
Preceded by Michael Armacost	United States Ambassador to the Philippines; 1984–1987	Succeeded by Nicholas Platt
Preceded by Edward W. Mulcahy	United States Ambassador to Tunisia; 1979–1981	Succeeded by Walter Leon Cutler
