= Rachna Korhonen =

American diplomat

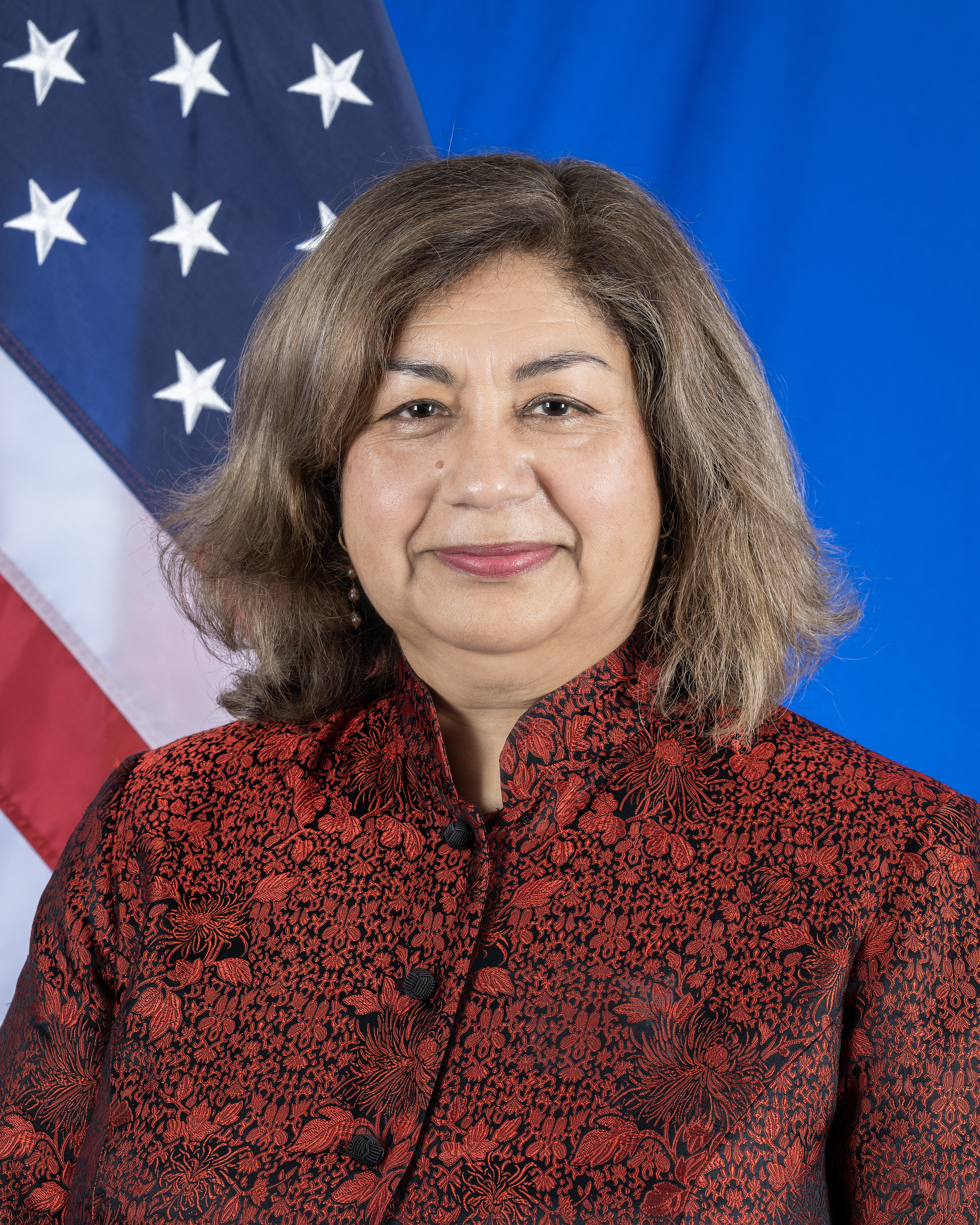

United States Ambassador to Mali
- In office March 16, 2023 – September 5, 2026
- President: Joe Biden
- Preceded by: Dennis B. Hankins

Personal details
- Education: Empire State College (BS)

Rachna Sachdeva Korhonen is an American diplomat who had served as the United States ambassador to Mali.

== Early life and education ==
Korhonen is from Flemington, New Jersey. She earned a Bachelor of Science degree in computer science and mathematics from Empire State College.

== Career ==
Korhonen began her career as a software programmer for IBM. From 1993 to 1999, she was a technical consultant at AT&T. She also worked in sales for the Zed Group, Telia Company, and Infosys. Korhonen joined the United States Foreign Service in 2004 and served in Dhahran, Colombo, and Washington, D.C. Korhonen also served in the Bureau of South and Central Asian Affairs and Bureau of Near Eastern Affairs. She was also an advisor to the under secretary of state for management.

=== U.S. ambassador to Mali ===
On April 22, 2022, President Joe Biden announced his intent to nominate Korhonen to be the next United States ambassador to Mali. On April 25, 2022, her nomination was sent to the Senate. On August 3, 2022, hearings on her nomination were held before the Senate Foreign Relations Committee. On December 7, 2022, the committee favorably reported her nomination to the Senate. On December 13, 2022, her nomination was confirmed by the Senate by voice vote. She presented her credentials to President Assimi Goïta on March 16, 2023.

== Personal life ==
Korhonen speaks Hindi, French, Finnish and Arabic.

Diplomatic posts
Preceded by Dennis B. Hankins	United States Ambassador to Mali; 2023–2026	Succeeded by Vacant
