= Robert L. Pugh =

American diplomat

Robert Lee Pugh
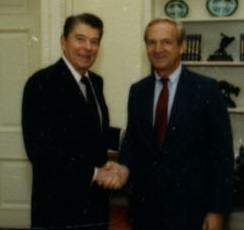
- Pugh (right) with President Reagan, 1988

14th United States Ambassador to Chad
- In office October 15, 1988 – November 15, 1989
- President: Ronald Reagan
- Preceded by: John Blane
- Succeeded by: Richard Wayne Bogosian

12th United States Ambassador to Mauritania
- In office September 5, 1985 – July 5, 1988
- President: Ronald Reagan
- Preceded by: Edward Lionel Peck
- Succeeded by: William H. Twaddell

Personal details
- Born: 27 October 1931 Clinton, Pennsylvania
- Died: 28 January 2013 (aged 81) Columbus, Mississippi
- Spouse(s): Bonnie Barnes Pugh; Thelma Jackson Pugh
- Profession: Diplomat

Military service
- Branch/service: United States Marine Corps
- Years of service: 1954–61
- Rank: Captain

Robert Lee Pugh (October 27, 1931 – January 28, 2013) was an American diplomat. He was the United States Ambassador to Chad from 1988 to 1989 and Mauritania from 1985 to 1988.

== Biography ==
Pugh was born on October 27, 1931, in Clinton, Pennsylvania. He graduated from the University of Washington with a B.A. in 1954. From 1954 to 1961, Pugh served in the United States Marine Corps. He entered the U.S. Foreign Service in 1961. He served as an international economist for the Department of State from 1961 to 1963. He also served as a political-military officer in Ankara, Turkey, from 1964 to 1967, and as principal officer of the American consulate in Isfahan, Iran, from 1967 to 1969. From 1969 to 1972, he was a political officer in the Office of Turkish Affairs for the Bureau of Near Eastern and South Asian Affairs in the Department of State. He served as a political-military officer in Athens, Greece, from 1972 to 1976, congressional relations officer at the Department of State from 1976 to 1977, political adviser to CINCUSNAVEUR in London, England, from 1977 to 1979, and as deputy director of the Office of Southern European Affairs in the Bureau of European Affairs from 1979 to 1981. Pugh was a personnel placement officer in the Bureau of Personnel from 1981 to 1982. From 1982 to 1984, he was Deputy Chief of Mission at the U.S. Embassy in Beirut, Lebanon. From 1984 to 1985, he attended the Executive Seminar in National and International Affairs.

He was awarded the State Department's Award for Valor in 1983 for his work in Beirut.

On September 5, 1985, Pugh became the United States Ambassador to the Islamic Republic of Mauritania, after having been nominated by President Reagan. He left that post in 1988, and was nominated as U.S. Ambassador to Chad shortly after. He left the ambassadorship in 1989.

Pugh was married in 1955 to Bonnie (Barnes) Pugh, who died aboard UTA Flight 772 that was downed in a bomb explosion over the Ténéré desert near Bilma, Niger. Pugh was the American ambassador to Chad at the time. He had two children, Malcom Pugh and Anne (Pugh) Carey.

Pugh died on January 28, 2013, at age 81 in Columbus, Mississippi, from Parkinson's disease.

Diplomatic posts
Preceded by John Blane	United States Ambassador to Chad; 1988–1989	Succeeded by Richard Wayne Bogosian
