= William G. Bradford =

American diplomat

9th United States Ambassador to Chad
- In office October 15, 1976 – June 19, 1979
- President: Gerald Ford
- Preceded by: Edward S. Little
- Succeeded by: Donald R. Norland

Personal details
- Born: January 6, 1925 Illinois, United States
- Died: July 16, 2008 (aged 83) Fairfax, Virginia, United States
- Spouse: Joanne Schwarz
- Profession: Diplomat

William G. Bradford (January 6, 1925 – July 16, 2008) was an American diplomat. He was the United States Ambassador to Chad from 1976 to 1979.

== Early life ==
William Bradford was born in Illinois in 1925.

== Career ==
He joined the U.S. Foreign service c.1952. He oversaw diplomatic positions in Berlin, West Germany (1952 to 1955), and Naples, Italy (1955 to 1958), in the Public Safety Division and Refugee Relief Act, respectively.

He was the Assistant Secretary for Administration of Streamlining Management in Washington, D.C. from 1958 to 1960. From 1962 to 1964, he worked at the U.S. Embassy in Saigon, South Vietnam.

He was on detail at the U.S. Embassy in Freetown, Sierra Leone, from 1966 to 1968. From 1969 to 1975 he worked at the Department of African Affairs. In 1976, Bradford assisted in the U.S. Military evacuation of Saigon.

He was appointed as United States Ambassador to Chad by President Gerald Ford on September 3, 1976. He was confirmed on October 15, 1976, and served until June 19, 1979. He was later the campaign manager for 1980 presidential candidate John B. Anderson.

== Death ==
Bradford died on July 16, 2008, of lung cancer at Inova Fairfax Hospital in Fairfax County, Virginia.

Diplomatic posts
Preceded by Edward S. Little	United States Ambassador to Chad; 1976–1979	Succeeded by Donald R. Norland
