= Carl Copeland Cundiff =

American diplomat

United States Ambassador to Niger
- In office 1988–1991
- President: Ronald Reagan
- Preceded by: Richard Wayne Bogosian

Personal details
- Born: March 29, 1941 New Orleans, Louisiana
- Education: University of the South (BA); Fletcher School of Law and Diplomacy (MA, MALD, PhD); Harvard Kennedy School (MPA)

Carl Copeland Cundiff (March 29, 1941, New Orleans) was the American Ambassador to Niger from 1988 to 1991. He was nominated by Ronald Reagan to succeed Richard Wayne Bogosian.

A career foreign service officer since 1965 he served in a variety of overseas locations such as Singapore, Saigon, Vietnam, and Paris, France among other posts.

Cundiff graduated from the University of the South with a B.A. in 1963) followed by several degrees from the Fletcher School of Law and Diplomacy (M.A., 1964; M.A.L.D., 1965; Ph.D., 1968). He also attended Harvard University’s Kennedy School of Government, graduating with a M.P.A. in 1974.

Diplomatic posts
Preceded by Richard Wayne Bogosian	United States Ambassador to Niger; 1988-1991	Succeeded by Jennifer C. Ward (diplomat)
