= Marc M. Wall =

American diplomat

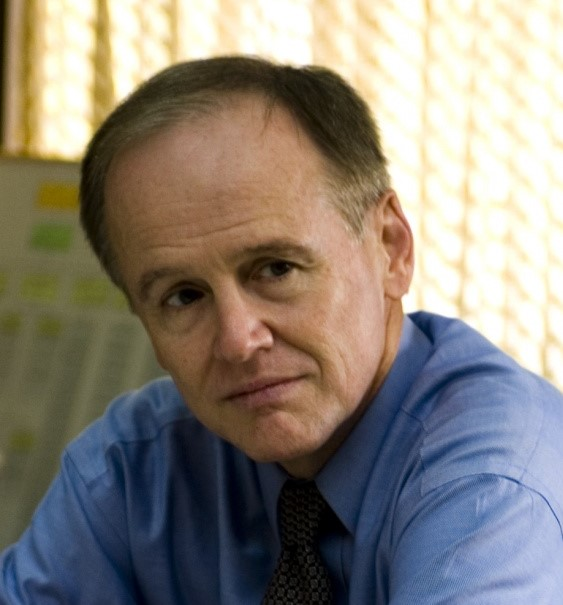
- Wall as Coordinator for Economic Transition, U.S. Embassy - Baghdad in 2009.

19th United States Ambassador to Chad
- In office June 16, 2004 – July 5, 2007
- President: George W. Bush
- Preceded by: Christopher E. Goldthwait
- Succeeded by: Louis J. Nigro, Jr.

Personal details
- Born: 1954 (age 71–72) Virginia
- Spouse: Eunice Reddick
- Profession: Diplomat

Marc M. Wall (born 1954) is an American diplomat. He was the United States Ambassador to Chad from 2004 to 2007.

== Biography ==
Marc Wall was born in 1954. He later joined the U.S Foreign Service, overseeing posts as Director of the Bureau of African Affairs’ Economic Policy Staff in Washington D.C. and overseas posts in the U.S. Embassies in Ivory Coast and Zimbabwe. Wall became affiliated with African issues in the course of several assignments with the Bureau of Economic and Business Affairs and as a special assistant to the Under Secretary for Economic, Business, and Agricultural Affairs.

Wall has also served several diplomatically in Asia. He served as Chief of the Economic Office, American Institute in Taiwan (AIT) and worked in the Trade Unit in the U.S. Embassy in Beijing China. He was involved in negotiations that led to China's and Taiwan's accessions to the World Trade Organization (WTO). He later became Deputy Director of the Bureau of Asian and Pacific Affairs’ Office of Economic Policy in Washington, and was active in the development of the Asia Pacific Economic Cooperation (APEC) forum. He was also a member of the Secretary of State's Policy Planning Council.

Wall resides in Virginia and was appointed as United States Ambassador to Chad by President George W. Bush on May 12, 2004. He was confirmed on June 16, 2004, and left that post on July 5, 2007. Wall was previously married to the former United States Ambassador to Gabon and São Tomé and Príncipe, Eunice S. Reddick. They have two children, Gregory and Sarah.

Remarried on March 25, 2024.

Diplomatic posts
Preceded by Christopher E. Goldthwait	United States Ambassador to Chad; 2004–2007	Succeeded by Louis J. Nigro, Jr.
