= Laurence Pope =

American diplomat (1945–2020)

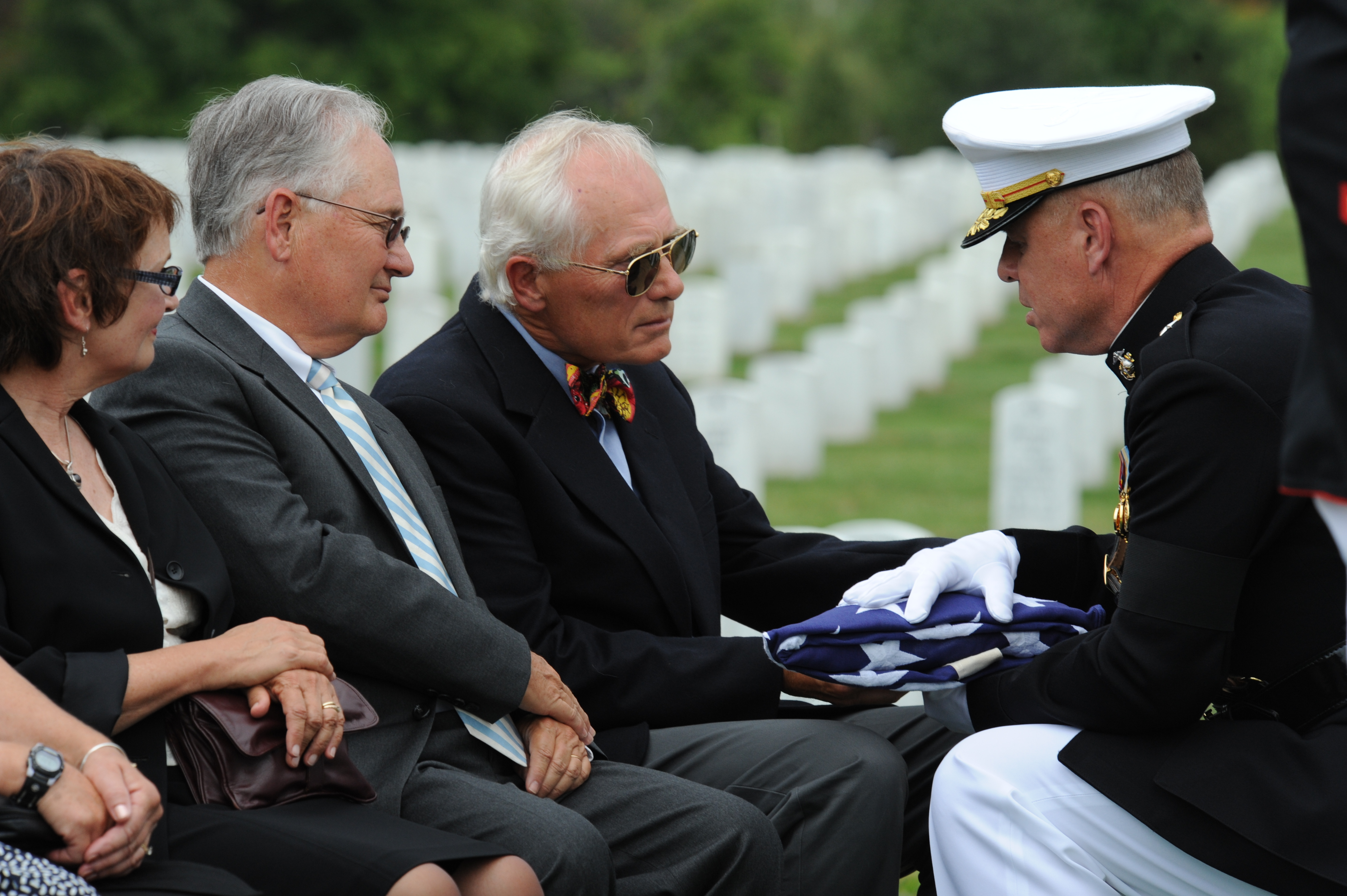
- Laurence Pope (second from right) at the burial service for Major Pope (his father), Arlington National Cemetery, September 15, 2009

16th United States Ambassador to Chad
- In office September 3, 1993 – June 26, 1996
- President: Bill Clinton
- Preceded by: Richard Wayne Bogosian
- Succeeded by: David C. Halsted (as Chargé d'affaires)

Chargé d’Affaires of United States in Libya
- In office October 11, 2012 – January 4, 2013
- President: Barack Obama
- Preceded by: J. Christopher Stevens (As Ambassador)
- Succeeded by: William Roebuck (as Chargé d'affaires)

Personal details
- Born: Laurence Everett Pope II; September 24, 1945 New Haven, Connecticut, United States
- Died: October 31, 2020 (aged 75) Portland, Maine, United States
- Spouse: Elizabeth
- Profession: Diplomat

Laurence Everett Pope II (September 24, 1945 – October 31, 2020) was an American diplomat. He was the United States Ambassador to Chad from 1993 to 1996 and former US Chargé d’Affaires to Libya. Pope held a number of senior posts in the Department of State. He was the Director for Northern Gulf Affairs (1987–1990), associate director for Counter-Terrorism (1991–1993), U.S. Ambassador to Chad (1993–1996), and Political Advisor to General Anthony Zinni USMC, Commander-in-Chief of United States Central Command (1997–2000).

In 2000, President Bill Clinton nominated him as Ambassador to Kuwait but his appointment was not confirmed by the Senate.

Ambassador Pope retired from the U.S. Foreign Service on October 2, 2000, after 31 years of service. He continued to consult with various institutions and was a respected arabist. A graduate of Bowdoin College, Pope also had advanced studies at Princeton University and is a graduate of the U.S. Department of State Senior Seminar, a Senior Fellow at the Armed Forces Staff College. He spoke Arabic and French, and resided in Portland, Maine.

Laurence Pope was the eldest son of Medal of Honor recipient Major Everett P. Pope, who was married to Eleanor Pope. He had a brother named Ralph H. Pope.

On Thursday, October 11, 2012, exactly one month after the assassination of his predecessor J. Christopher Stevens, the U.S. Department of State announced that Ambassador Pope had arrived in Tripoli as the U.S. Chargé d’Affaires in Libya.

On January 4, 2013, the United States embassy in Tripoli announced that William Roebuck arrived in Tripoli as the new Chargé d’Affaires in Libya replacing Pope.

Pope died at his home in Portland, Maine, from pancreatic cancer.

== Publications ==
- Letters (1694–1700) of François de Callières to the Marquis d’Huxelles (Edwin Mellen Press, 2004)
- "Advice and Contempt", Foreign Service Journal, April 2001, Vo. 78, No. 4.

Diplomatic posts
Preceded by Richard Wayne Bogosian	United States Ambassador to Chad; 1993–1996	Succeeded by David C. Halsted
Preceded by J. Christopher Stevens	United States Ambassador to Libya; 2012–2013	Succeeded by William Roebuck
