= Charles J. Nelson =

American diplomat

Charles Joseph Nelson (1921 Battle Creek, Michigan - January 15, 2011, Washington, DC) was an American Ambassador, academic and USAID administrator.

Nelson graduated from Lincoln University in 1942 and served in the US Army in Europe during World War II. After his Army service, he received a master's degree in public administration from New York University in 1948.

Nelson began working for the Mutual Security Administration (the forerunner of the U.S. Agency for International Development (USAID)) in the Philippines as Deputy Chief of the Rural Development Division from 1952 to 1958. After a short stint in Iran, he returned to the Philippines as Chief of the Community Development Division from 1958 to 1960.

He joined the Peace Corp, working in West Africa and returned to USAID. Richard Nixon nominated him to be the US Ambassador to Botswana, Lesotho, and Swaziland (currently called Eswatini) on June 9, 1971, and he served from 1971 to 1974. From 1974 until 1978, Nelson worked in Nairobi, Kenya as USAID's Director of Kenya Programs. He spent the following three years heading Howard University‘s international studies graduate program.

Nelson died of kidney failure on January 15, 2011, in Washington, DC.
