= List of ambassadors of the United States to Chad =

Ambassador of the United States to Chad
- Seal of the United States Department of State

- Flag of a United States ambassador

- Incumbent; William Flens; Chargé d'affaires since July 11, 2025
- Nominator: The president of the United States
- Appointer: The president; with Senate advice and consent
- Inaugural holder: W. Wendell Blancke as Minister Plenipotentiary to the Court of St. James's
- Formation: January 9, 1961
- Website: U.S. Embassy - N'Djamena

This is a list of ambassadors of the United States to Chad.

- 9 January 1961 – 28 May 1961 W. Wendell Blancke (Resident at Republic of Congo)
- Jan 1961 - May 1961 Frederic L. Chapin (Interim)
- 28 May 1961 – 1 April 1963 John A. Calhoun
- 12 August 1963 – 20 January 1967 Brewster H. Morris
- 23 September 1967 – 9 May 1969 Sheldon B. Vance
- 21 August 1969 – 29 June 1972 Terence A. Todman
- 6 December 1972 – 23 June 1974 Edward W. Mulcahy
- 7 December 1974 – 23 February 1976 Edward S. Little
- 15 October 1976 – 19 June 1979 William G. Bradford
- 17 November 1979 – 24 March 1980 Donald R. Norland (Embassy closed 24 March 1980)
- 15 January 1982 – 27 May 1983 John Blane (Reopened embassy 15 January 1982, as Principal Officer and Chargé d'Affaires ad interim)
- 27 May 1983 – 23 July 1985 Jay P. Moffat
- 2 September 1985 – 4 October 1988 John Blane
- 15 October 1988 – 15 November 1989 Robert L. Pugh
- 4 August 1990 – 21 July 1993 Richard Wayne Bogosian
- 3 September 1993 – 26 June 1996 Laurence Everett Pope II
- 12 September 1996 – 6 August 1999 David C. Halsted
- 10 October 1999 – 16 January 2004 Christopher E. Goldthwait
- 16 June 2004 – 7 July 2007 Marc M. Wall
- 16 November 2007 – Sep 2010 Louis J. Nigro, Jr.
- 10 November 2010 – 25 July 2013 Mark Boulware
- 6 September 2013 – 11 August 2016 James Knight
- 9 September 2016 – 20 September 2018 Geeta Pasi
- 18 August 2022 – 28 February 2025 Alexander Laskaris

== See also ==
- Chad – United States relations
- Foreign relations of Chad
