= Giles Dawson =

American Shakespearean scholar (1903–1994)

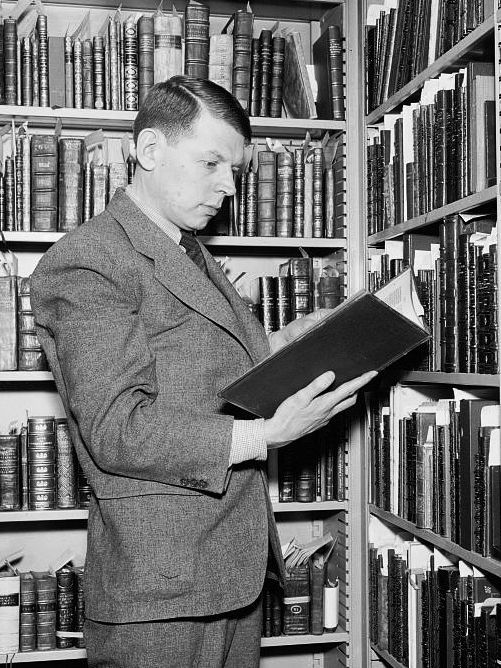
- Giles E. Dawson examining rare books acquired for the Folger Library, Washington, D.C., 14 May 1938
- Born: Giles Edwin Dawson; 4 March 1903; Columbus, Ohio, United States
- Died: 26 August 1994 (aged 91)
- Education: Oberlin College, Cornell University
- Occupations: 20th-century Shakespearean scholar, paleographer, and librarian
- Spouses: Margaret Williams (m. 1926; died 1957) Margaret White (m. 1959)
- Children: 2+3
- Parents: William Leon Dawson (father); Frances Etta Akerman (mother)

Giles Edwin Dawson (4 March 1903 – 26 August 1994) was a 20th-century Shakespearean scholar, paleographer, and librarian.

== Life ==
Born in Columbus, Ohio, the son of noted American ornithologist William Leon Dawson and Frances Etta Akerman. Dawson graduated from Oberlin College in 1925 and went on to earn an MA and PhD from Cornell University. He served on the faculty of the University of North Dakota and the Case Western Reserve University in Cleveland before joining the Folger Shakespeare Library as a reference librarian in 1932.

Dawson served in the U. S. Navy in World War II. From 1946 until his retirement in 1967, he was the curator of books and manuscripts for the Folger. He was a member of the Catholic University faculty from 1935 to 1972, lecturing to graduate students until 1967. He also taught at Howard University from 1975 to 1977. From 1984 until May 1994, he volunteered as the rare-book librarian for the Washington National Cathedral.

== Family ==
Dawson married Margaret Williams in 1926. They had two children. She died in 1957. Two years later he married Margaret White, with whom he had three children.

== Major works ==
- July and Julian. Ed. with Arthur Brown. Malone Society Reprints, 1955
- Life of William Shakespeare. Folger Shakespeare Library, 1958
- Four Centuries of Shakespeare Publication. University of Kansas Press, 1964
- Records of plays and players in Kent, 1450-1642. Malone Society Collections, Vol. 7, Oxford University Press, 1965
- Elizabethan Handwriting, 1500–1650: A Guide to the Reading of Documents. with Laetitia Kennedy-Skipton. W. W. Norton and Company, 1966
- "A Seventh Signature for Shakespeare". Shakespeare Quarterly 43 (Spring 1992): 72–79, p. 79
