= St. Boniface High School (Kimberley, South Africa) =

- Hoërskool van Heilige Boniface (Afrikaans)

Location
- 35B Corless Road; Kimberley, Northern Cape, 8301; South Africa

Information
- Type: Private, coeducational
- Motto: Sequere Christum (Follow Christ)
- Religious affiliations: Roman Catholic, Congregation of Christian Brothers
- Patron saint: St. Boniface
- Established: 1951
- Founder: Br. Elphage Enda St. Martin, C.F.C. and Br. John James Hayes, C.F.C.
- School district: Diocese of Kimberley
- Principal: Ms. Nomvula Dondolo
- Grades: 8-12
- Enrolment: 1,000
- Language: English
- Campus type: Rural
- Colours: Green, yellow and navy blue
- School fees: R8,600 (2020)
- Website: www.stbonifacecbc.co.za

St. Boniface High School (formerly St. Boniface Mission School) is an independent Roman Catholic high school located in Galeshewe, Kimberly, Northern Cape, South Africa. It was established in 1951 by the Congregation of Christian Brothers and today serves nearly 1,000 students.

== History ==
The Kimberley location of St. Boniface High School was for years a mission church and school run for native Africans by German priests and nuns. By 1950, the St. Boniface Mission School, which included elementary through high school grades, had grown so large that the parish leadership had decided that a male religious order would be better suited to the size and stature of the school. An Irish Christian Brother, Paul Dunn, C.F.C., already served as the elementary school principal. He suggested the Christian Brothers to serve the school. Br. Ferdinand Clancy, C.F.C., Superior General of the Brothers, wrote to the Brother Principal of the American Province, Br. Austin Gleason, C.F.C., requesting they send Brothers to found an independent high school in Kimberley. Forty Brothers out of 100 province-wide offered to join in the mission.

Two men were chosen, Brs. Elphage Enda St. Martin, C.F.C., and John James Hayes, C.F.C. The school was named St. Boniface High School, and opened for classes in January 1951. The school grew tremendously during the early years, and was funded both by the parish and the state. Relations with the South African government became icy as it became known that the Brothers were offering the black African students a college preparatory education. After the Minister of Bantu Education met with Principal Br. Hayes, the school no longer received government funding, and relied nearly solely on American aid. In 1959, Br. Hayes was deported from the country for his publicly known anti-Apartheid sentiments and actions, and Br. St. Martin replaced him as principal. He later came back to visit the school in 1997 once the Apartheid had ended. He was by then a layperson, having left the Brothers.

During the 1960s, the school expanded its extracurricular and athletic programs significantly. The first dramatic performance at St. Boniface was Oklahoma!, organized and directed by Br. Joseph Matthews, C.F.C., math instructor and sports coach. The school also added a brass band, the Stardusters, founded by Br. Michael Malvey, C.F.C. He wrote to the New York City Police Department, which donated the unused instruments from their recently disbanded brass band. A fellow teacher with a wealthy family, Br. Stoltz, C.F.C., quietly paid for both the purchase and shipment of band uniforms and the shipment of the instruments.

Brother Elphage E. St. Martin, C.F.C., then known by his religious name Enda, describes the founding and early years of the school, as the well as the larger events and situation in Kimberly:

"The Mission was started by the German Oblate Fathers [(Missionary Oblates of Mary Immaculate)] and named after the patron saint of Germany. It was the German Oblates who staffed most places in the Kimberley Diocese. They were the ones to greet [Br.] James Hayes and I when we arrived to start a high school in January 1951. The school year began in January. The nuns at the mission were German Dominicans [of] Oakford, and there were several Dominican Sisters’ communities in the area.

The parish priest at St. Boniface was Fr. Hartjes, O.M.I. And, of course, an old Irish Brother of ours, Br. Paul Dundon, C.F.C., taught in the St. Boniface grade school. Probably, Paul was the original contact who helped the Brothers get there. At this point Paul was the grade school principal and made continuous efforts to get blankets and food to the people who were extremely poor. He unashamedly begged help for the black students from his many contacts with Christian Brothers’ College Old Boys Alumni, many of whom he had taught prior to going to the mission. CBC was a very high-class boarding school for whites with an Olympic-size swimming bath (no such things as pools down there), top quality tennis courts, a prime cricket pitch, a chapel bigger than the parish church, a chiming clock tower, brick buildings, etc.

In those Apartheid years, the area was known as a compound and it had a diamond mine in its adjacent environs. Blacks came from all over Africa and applied to work in the diamond mines. It provided very low pay, but then the tribal Africans had no pay at all in their villages. These compounds were surrounded by double-wire fences with razor coils on top; guards and attack dogs patrolled the fenced ring around the mine complex. Natives signed up for four-month stretches of mine labor. There were no females in their living areas so homosexuality was common among the workers.

The other area where the black people lived was called a location. This was an urban native township and there was one in this case next to the compound. Location was their original names but by this point the government called them Bantu Townships. Natives could only live in a location or if living in a white area, they had to live within the servant quarters on that plot. Some locations had thatched huts but the ones near St. Boniface had simple brick houses with one or two rooms, mostly no electricity or plumbing. They used candles or oil lamps and water from taps located about a block or two away. There were common laundry tubs with taps of only cold water. There were public toilets which used a ‘honey bucket’ system.

The locations were separated from the white areas by what was euphemistically termed a ‘green belt.’ There was no grass, however. It was a semi-desert and the students of the Mission could use it for soccer fields. There were also areas for ‘Coloureds.’ These were people of mixed blood. Everyone carried a government ID card with his/her classification: White, Bantu, Coloured, Indian. Asiatics did not have a classification. The people in the location, who usually had jobs in the white area, went into town each day to work at whatever jobs they were allowed to have. All technical and skilled jobs were ruled out, ‘job reservation’ it was called. The blacks did the laboring jobs: digging, carrying loads, cleaning, gardening, etc. Some were allowed to be doctors, nurses, lawyers, teachers and police but only in their own areas. A sad example; if a white person collapsed on the street, a black doctor could not attend to that person.

I don’t think it was any easier for us Americans to work at St. Boniface than it would be for the Irish, or any other whites, even if [they were] South African. [Brother Leo Christopher Uicker, C.F.C.] came to South Africa to replace me as the science and math teacher when I was reassigned to Zambia for the school year 1965. But I did get a chance to know him during my last year in Kimberley. After three years in Zambia, I was going to leave Africa for the American provinces, but I was asked to return to St. Boniface for the year 1968 because they were short one Brother for that year."

The Christian Brothers from the United States left the school in 1969 due to declining vocations and a reorganization of their province structure. They were replaced by Brothers from the South African Province. Some Dominican Sisters of Oakford, priests, and Brothers, one of whom - Br. Donald Madden, cfc- spent many years as principal of the school till his retirement.

Ms. Nomvula Dondolo was appointed the St Boniface's first lay female principal.

== List of principals ==
| Principal | Years |
|---|---|
| Br. John J. Hayes, C.F.C. | 1951–1959 |
| Br. Elphage E. St. Martin, C.F.C. | 1959-63-? |
| unknown | 1962-73 |
| Sr. Rita-Maria Diel, O.P. | 1973-80 |
| unknown | 1980-? |
| Br. Donald Madden, cfc | ?-1980s-? |
| unknown | ?-2007 |
| Ms. Nomvula Dondolo | ?-2007- |

== Alumni ==
The St. Boniface High School alumni association is the St. Boniface Past Pupils Union. It was known as the St. Boniface Old Boys Union until the school became coeducational. The Past Pupils Union organizes reunions and raises money for the school.

=== Notable alumni ===
- Manne Dipico, politician and businessman
- Yvonne Mokgoro, Constitutional Court judge
- Christopher Matlhako, ambassador
- Cecilia MAYNE {Kgarebe} Qualified Nurse, Business woman
