= Rosemarie Mulcahy =

Irish academic and author (1942–2012)

- Born: Rosemarie Scully; 3 April 1942 (age 84); Ireland
- Died: 5 September 2012 (aged 70); Dublin, Ireland
- Occupations: Academic; Author
- Years active: 1989–2012
- Spouse: Seán Mulcahy

Academic background
- Education: University College Dublin; London University; Trinity College Dublin

Academic work
- Discipline: 16th-century Spanish art; 17th-century Spanish art; Spanish Renaissance
- Institutions: University College Dublin

Rosemarie Mulcahy (née Scully; 3 April 1942 – 5 September 2012) was an Irish academic and author who specialised in 16th and 17th century Spanish art and the Spanish Renaissance. She taught undergraduate modules on Spanish art at the University College Dublin from 1989 to 2003 along with authoring books, essays, magazine articles and scholarly catalogues on the subject.

== Biography ==
She was born Rosemarie Scully on 3 April 1942 in Ireland. Growing up in a family with a strong presence in religious art, Mulcahy worked as a model for the Spanish courtier Pedro Rodríguez in Madrid, before working for Balmain in Paris in the early 1960s. She became attracted to Spanish art by viewing Abraham and the Three Angels' from the renaissance painter Juan Fernández Navarrete. Between 1970 and 1973, Mulcahy studied a Bachelor of Arts degree in history and the history of European painting at University College Dublin (UCD). She later studied for a Master's degree in the history of art at London University and, supervised by Anne Crookshank, wrote a doctoral dissertation on Philip II of Spain's artistic patronage at El Escorial at Trinity College Dublin. Mulcahy became involved in environmental initiatives, was an honorary secretary for An Taisce, and was an active committee member of the Upper Leeson Street Area Residents’ Association.

Her work involved 16th and 17th-century Spanish art and the Spanish Renaissance. With an interest in Irish contemporary art, in 1988, she served on the Rosc exhibition's executive committee, compiling its accompanying dialogue. That same year, Mulcahy compiled the scholarly catalogue Spanish Paintings at the National Gallery, which was commissioned by Homan Potterton. She began teaching undergraduate models on Spanish art at UCD in 1989 and was later made UCD's adjunct professor and honorary senior fellow of its history of art department. In 1992, Mulcahy's book, The Decoration of the Royal Basilica of El Escorial, was published. She talks about the reconstruction of Philip II's design of El Escorial in the book, the first time there was a thorough reconstruction of the building. The book won the 1994 Eleanor Tufts Prize from the American Society of Hispanic Art Historical Studies. Five years later, Mulcahy published a monographic book on a thesis on a painting by Juan Fernández de Navarrete.

In 2000, she helped to organise an exhibition of the graphic works of the painter and one of her favourite artists José Hernández in Dublin. Mulcahy stopped teaching at UCD in 2003. In 2004, she published her collective essays Philip II of Spain, Patron of the Arts. Although she had not thought of a career in university, she was visiting professor in Reinassance studies at Smith College in the United States in the 2009 spring semester. Mulcahy's works were published in Apollo, Archivo Español de Arte (English: Spanish Art Archive) and The Burlington Magazine. She was also an honorary associate of the Hispanic Society of America and was an honorary member of the Royal Hibernian Academy. At the time of her death, Mulcahy was involved in the study of sculptures of Pompeo Leoni on the high altar of the Escorial's basilica led by an international research group from the Museo del Prado.

== Personal life ==
She was married to the engineer and colour artist Seán Mulcahy (1926–2018). In 2001, Juan Carlos I of Spain presented Mulcahy with the Officer's Cross of the Order of Isabella the Catholic to recognise "her outstanding contribution to the study of Spanish art and culture." She died suddenly in Dublin on 5 September 2012.

== Legacy ==
According to The Irish Times, the Patrimonio Nacional, the Spanish royal site body, had admired Mulcahy's work, and "was a true hispanista, who loved Spain and its people, and had a passion for flamenco dance, in which art she herself excelled." In November 2013, UCD renamed a seminar room the Rosemarie Mulcahy Seminar Room in its School of Art History & Cultural Policy after her and the scholar's library of Spanish art works, archival material and research and teaching papers were donated by her family to the university to form the Rosemary Mulcahy Collection. The Rosemarie Mulcahy Scholarship for the Study of Spanish Art was established in her honour by Trinity College Dublin and the Centro de Estudios Europa Hispánica.
