= Edward W. Mulcahy =

American diplomat

Edward William Mulcahy

7th United States Ambassador to Chad
- In office December 6, 1972 – June 23, 1974
- President: Richard Nixon
- Preceded by: Terence A. Todman
- Succeeded by: Edward S. Little

7th United States Ambassador to Tunisia
- In office May 31, 1976 – January 5, 1979
- President: Gerald Ford; Jimmy Carter
- Preceded by: Talcott W. Seelye
- Succeeded by: Stephen Warren Bosworth

Personal details
- Born: June 15, 1921 Malden, Massachusetts, United States
- Died: March 12, 2006 (aged 84) Winchester, Virginia, United States
- Spouse: Kathleen Lyon
- Children: Six
- Education: Tufts University; Fletcher School of Law and Diplomacy
- Profession: Diplomat
- Awards: Two Purple Hearts; Silver Star

Military service
- Branch/service: United States Marine Corps
- Years of service: 1943–46
- Rank: Captain
- Unit: 21st Marines of the 3rd Marine Division
- Battles/wars: Pacific War, World War II; Battle of Guam (1944); Battle of Iwo Jima

Edward William Mulcahy (June 15, 1921 – March 12, 2006) was an American diplomat and captain in the United States Marine Corps. He was the United States Ambassador to Chad from 1972 to 1974 and to Tunisia from 1976 to 1979.

== Biography ==
=== Early life and military career, 1921–1946 ===
Edward Mulcahy was born in Malden, Massachusetts on June 15, 1921. His parents were John and Mary Alice (Duffy) Mulcahy. He was the eldest of seven children. He graduated from Malden Catholic High School in 1939. Mulcahy graduated from Tufts University with a degree in history in 1943.

He later joined the United States Marine Corps in January 1943, where in 1944 he led a company of the 21st Marines of the 3rd Marine Division during the Second Battle of Guam, as a Second Lieutenant. He was promoted to First Lieutenant in February 1945 and fought at the Battle of Iwo Jima. By the end of the war, Mulcahy had received the Silver Star award for his actions in Guam and two Purple Hearts. He was promoted to captain in 1946 and was in charge of the Marine detachment at the U.S. Navy brig on Governor's Island in New York City, New York. He left the Marine Corps in 1946.

=== Career in State Department, 1947–1980 ===
In 1946, Mulcahy attended the Fletcher School of Law and Diplomacy in Medford, Massachusetts, and received a master's degree from there in 1947. He joined the U.S. Foreign Service upon graduation. In Mulcahy's early years of service, he was a Consular Officer in Munich, Germany (1947 to 1949), U.S. Consul in Mombasa, Kenya (1949), and Political Officer to the U.S. Consulate in Asmara, Eritrea (1950–1953). In 1953 in Globe, Arizona, Mulcahy married Kathleen Lyon, a Foreign Service secretary, whom he had met in 1951 at the U.S. Consulate in Eritrea; her first foreign assignment was in Quito, Ecuador.

In 1953, Mulcahy worked on a variety of assignments in the U.S. State Department in Washington, D.C. until he became a Political Officer at the U.S. Embassy in Athens, Greece. In 1959, he was the Deputy Consul General in Salisbury, Rhodesia (now Zimbabwe). In 1963 he worked at the Bureau of the Near East and Africa Affairs with responsibility for Southern Africa at the State Department. He was appointed Deputy Chief of Mission at the U.S. Embassy in Tunis, Tunisia, in 1967, and later at the U.S. Embassy in Lagos, Nigeria, in 1970.

On October 12, 1972, Mulcahy was nominated by President Nixon to be the United States Ambassador to the Republic of Chad. He was confirmed on December 6, 1972, and left that post on June 23, 1974. Later in 1974, Mulcahy became the Deputy Assistant Secretary of State for African Affairs at the State Department. During this time, he worked very closely with then Secretary of State, Henry Kissinger, during the Angolan Civil War. On March 4, 1976, Mulcahy was nominated to be the United States Ambassador to Tunisia, this time by President Ford. He was confirmed on May 31, 1976, and served until January 5, 1979. He retired from the Foreign Service in 1980, with 33 years of governmental service, after spending a year as a Diplomat-in-Residence at the Atlanta University (now part of Clark Atlanta University), lecturing about U.S. foreign policy in Africa, and setting up the curriculum for a graduate program in foreign relations.

=== Retirement and later life, 1980–2006 ===
Upon retiring from the Foreign Service, Mulcahy went to work for Project HOPE, headquartered at Carter Hall in Millwood, Virginia (Clark Co.) as the Director of Operations, under the Executive Director/CEO and Founder of Project HOPE, Dr. William B. Walsh, MD. He stepped down from that position after only two years. Mulcahy lived in Winchester, Virginia, with his wife, for the remainder of his life and remained active in guest lecturing occasionally at the local community college, in his parish, in the Ancient Order of Hibernians, and in Marine Corps activities and reunions, such as the annual "Toys for Tots" campaign. He was an excellent linguist, and spoke German, French, Italian, Latin, Swahili and Greek as foreign languages. During his retirement years, he also taught himself modern Irish In 1997 Mulcahy was diagnosed with Alzheimer's disease and in September 2000, he and his wife took up residence at the Westminster-Canterbury in Winchester, Virginia, where they remained until the end of their lives. His wife, Kathleen, died on February 23, 2005. On March 12, 2006, Mulcahy died of natural causes at the age of 84, and his Funeral Mass was held on Friday, March 17, 2006, St Patrick's Day, a fitting date for a man who took great pride in his Irish heritage. His Funeral Mass was celebrated by his youngest child, Fr. Brian M. Mulcahy, O.P. He was buried on April 4, 2006, at Arlington National Cemetery with full military honors, provided by the United States Marine Corps.

He was survived by three brothers, two sisters, five children, and nine grandchildren. His last surviving sibling, his youngest sister, Elizabeth (Betty) Mulcahy McKeon, was buried on June 24, 2020, in Nashua, NH.

Diplomatic posts
Preceded by Terence A. Todman	United States Ambassador to Chad; 1972–1974	Succeeded by Edward S. Little
Preceded by Talcott W. Seelye	United States Ambassador to Tunisia; 1976–1979	Succeeded by Stephen W. Bosworth
