= Edward Mulcahy (State Department official) =

American diplomat

Edward Mulcahy served as deputy to Assistant United States Secretary of State Nathaniel Davis.

== Angola ==
President Gerald Ford approved covert aid to the National Union for the Total Independence of Angola (UNITA) and the National Liberation Front of Angola (FNLA), rebel groups in Angola, through Operation IA Feature on July 18, 1975, despite strong opposition from officials in the State Department and the CIA. Ford told William Colby, the Director of Central Intelligence, to "go ahead and do it," with an initial US$ 6 million in funding. He granted an additional $8 million in funding on July 27 and another $25 million in August.

Two days prior to the program's approval Assistant Secretary Davis told Henry Kissinger, the Secretary of State, that he believed maintaining the secrecy of IA Feature would be impossible. Davis correctly predicted the Soviet Union would respond by increasing its involvement in Angola, leading to more violence and negative publicity for the United States. When Ford approved the program Davis resigned. John Stockwell, the CIA's station chief in Angola, echoed Davis' criticism saying the program needed to be expanded to be successful, but the program was already too large to be kept out of the public eye. Mulcahy, Davis' deputy also opposed direct involvement. Mulcahy presented three options for U.S. policy towards Angola on May 13, 1975. He believed the Ford administration could use diplomacy to campaign against foreign aid to the Communist People's Movement for the Liberation of Angola (MPLA), refuse to take sides in factional fighting, or increase support for the FNLA and UNITA. He warned however that supporting UNITA would not sit well with Mobutu Sese Seko, the ruler of Zaire.
