= Embassy of the United States, Dushanbe =

Embassy of the United States in Tajikistan
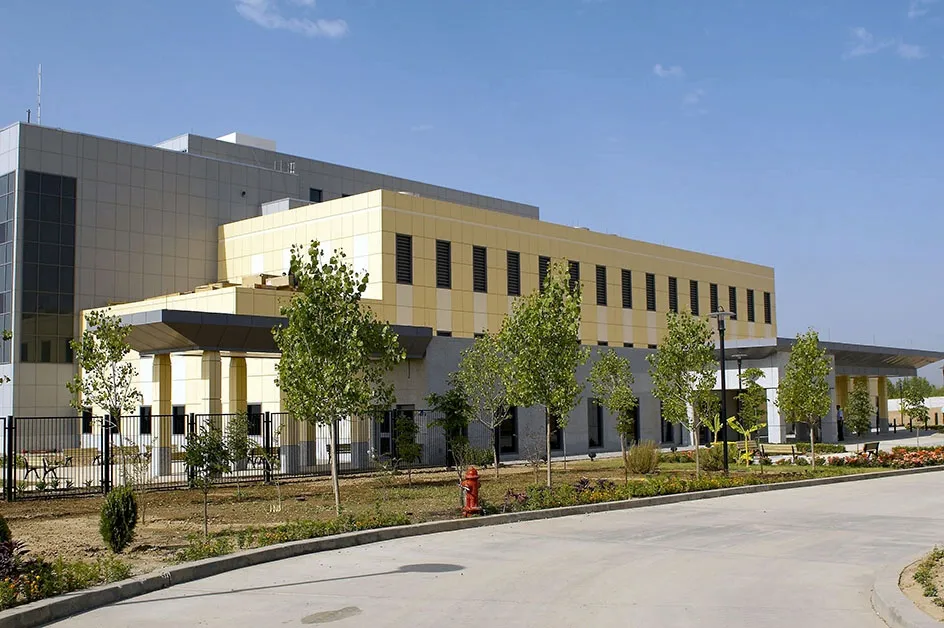
- Address: 109-A, Ismoili Somoni Avenue (Zarafshon district) Dushanbe, Tajikistan 734019
- Coordinates: 38°34′44″N 68°42′43″E
- Opened: March 1992
- Relocated: 1998 (temporary relocation to Almaty, Kazakhstan)
- Renovated: June 28, 2006 (moved to new building)
- Ambassador: Manuel Micaller
- Website: tj.usembassy.gov

The Embassy of the United States in Tajikistan (Tajik: Safarati Iyoloti Muttahidai Amriko dar Tojikiston) is a diplomatic mission of the United States of America in the Republic of Tajikistan. The embassy is located in the capital of Tajikistan, the city of Dushanbe. The country participates in the C5+1 diplomatic summit.

== History ==
The United States recognized the independence of Tajikistan on December 25, 1991, following the Dissolution of the Soviet Union. Diplomatic relations between the two countries were established on February 19, 1992 In March 1992, the U.S. Embassy in Dushanbe was opened, headed by interim Chargé d'Affaires of the U.S., Edmund McWilliams, at the "Avesto" hotel. The first U.S. Ambassador to Tajikistan, Stanley Escudero, was appointed in August 1992, and presented credentials in March 1993 to the Chairman of the Supreme Council of the Republic of Tajikistan, Emomali Rahmon.

On October 25, 1992, six days after Ambassador Escudero's arrival, the American embassy in Tajikistan was temporarily closed, and all staff were evacuated due to the Tajikistani Civil War. The embassy resumed its operations on March 11, 1993.

In 1998, following the 1998 United States embassy bombings, the American embassy staff in Dushanbe were temporarily relocated to Almaty due to heightened security standards for embassies. From 1998 to 2006, the U.S. Embassy operated from the ambassador's residence on Pavlova Street, and dozens of American staff members split their time between Almaty and Dushanbe. Soon, on June 28, 2006, the American staff moved to a new, specially built U.S. Embassy complex in Dushanbe.

In August 2021, the embassy rejected a request by Markwayne Mullin for assistance to illegally enter Afghanistan with a large amount of cash. In September 2021, the U.S. announced plans to assist Tajikistan in fortifying its borders with Afghanistan and Uzbekistan.

== See also ==
- Embassy of Tajikistan, Washington, D.C.
- List of ambassadors of the United States to Tajikistan
- List of diplomatic missions in Tajikistan
- Tajikistan–United States relations
