= List of ambassadors of Tajikistan to the United States =

Coordinates: 38.903172°N 77.049358°W

Ambassador of Tajikistan to the United States Embassy of Tajikistan in Washington, D.C.
- Ali
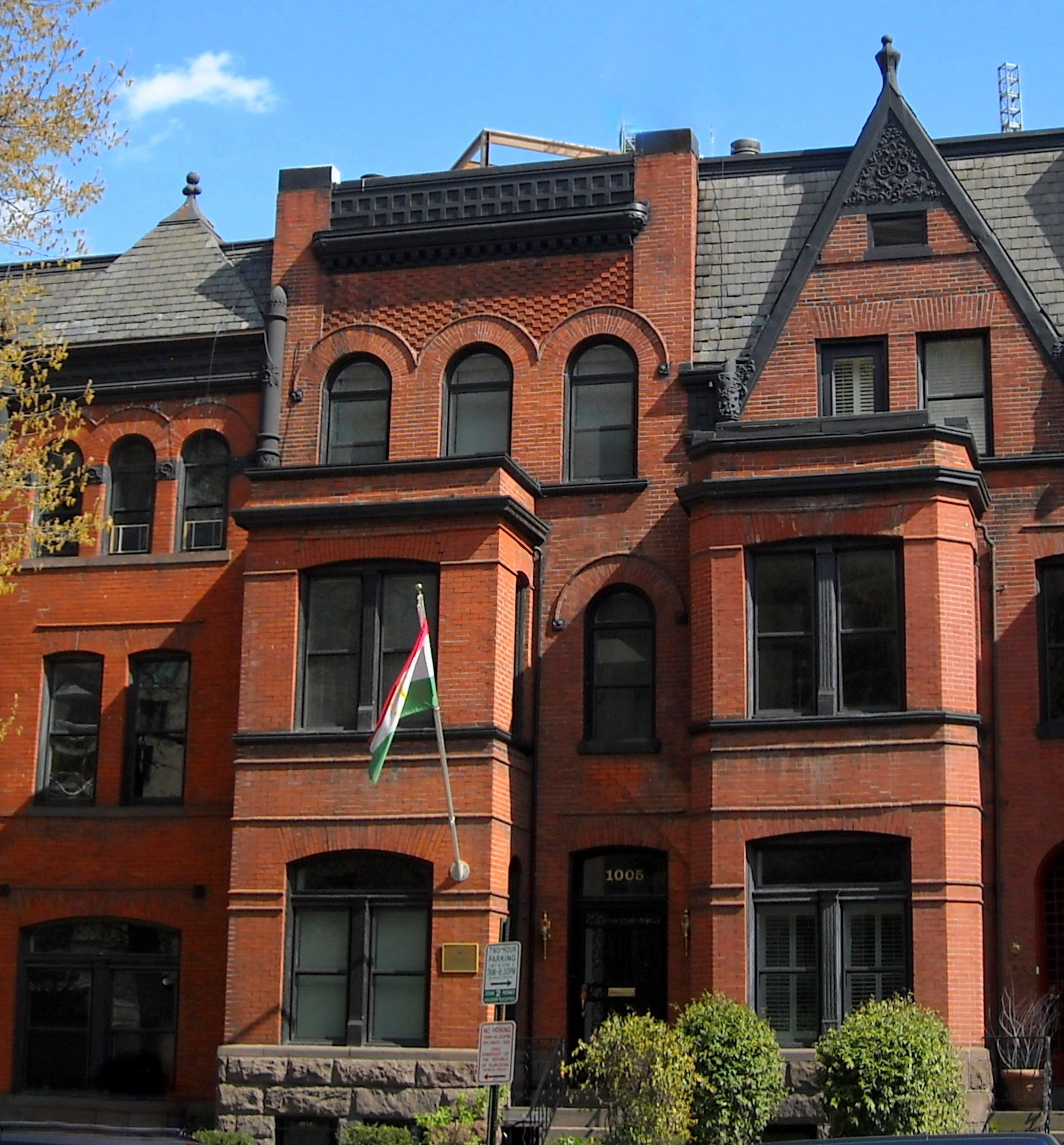
- Incumbent; Farhod Salim since May 15, 2014
- Inaugural holder: Shamsov Rahmonali
- Formation: September 24, 2000

The Tajikistan Ambassador in Washington, D. C. is the official representative of the Government of the Republic of Tajikistan to the Government of the United States.

== List of representatives ==
Diplomatic agreement/designated	Diplomatic accreditation	Ambassador	Observations	Prime Minister of Tajikistan	List of presidents of the United States	Term end
February 7, 2003			EMBASSY OPENED	Oqil Oqilov	George W. Bush	
February 7, 2003	February 26, 2003	Hamrokhon Zaripov	In 2007 he was appointed Foreign Minister, replacing Talbak Nazarov. Nazarov headed the MFA since December 1994.	Oqil Oqilov	George W. Bush	
February 21, 2007	February 27, 2007	Abdujabbor Shirinov		Oqil Oqilov	George W. Bush	
July 26, 2012	July 30, 2012	Nuriddin Shamsov		Oqil Oqilov	Barack Obama	November 23, 2013
May 15, 2014		Farhod Salim		Kohir Rasulzoda	Barack Obama	

== See also ==
- Tajikistan–United States relations
