= List of ambassadors of the United States to Tajikistan =

Ambassador of the United States to Tajikistan
- Seal of the United States Department of State

- Flag of a United States ambassador

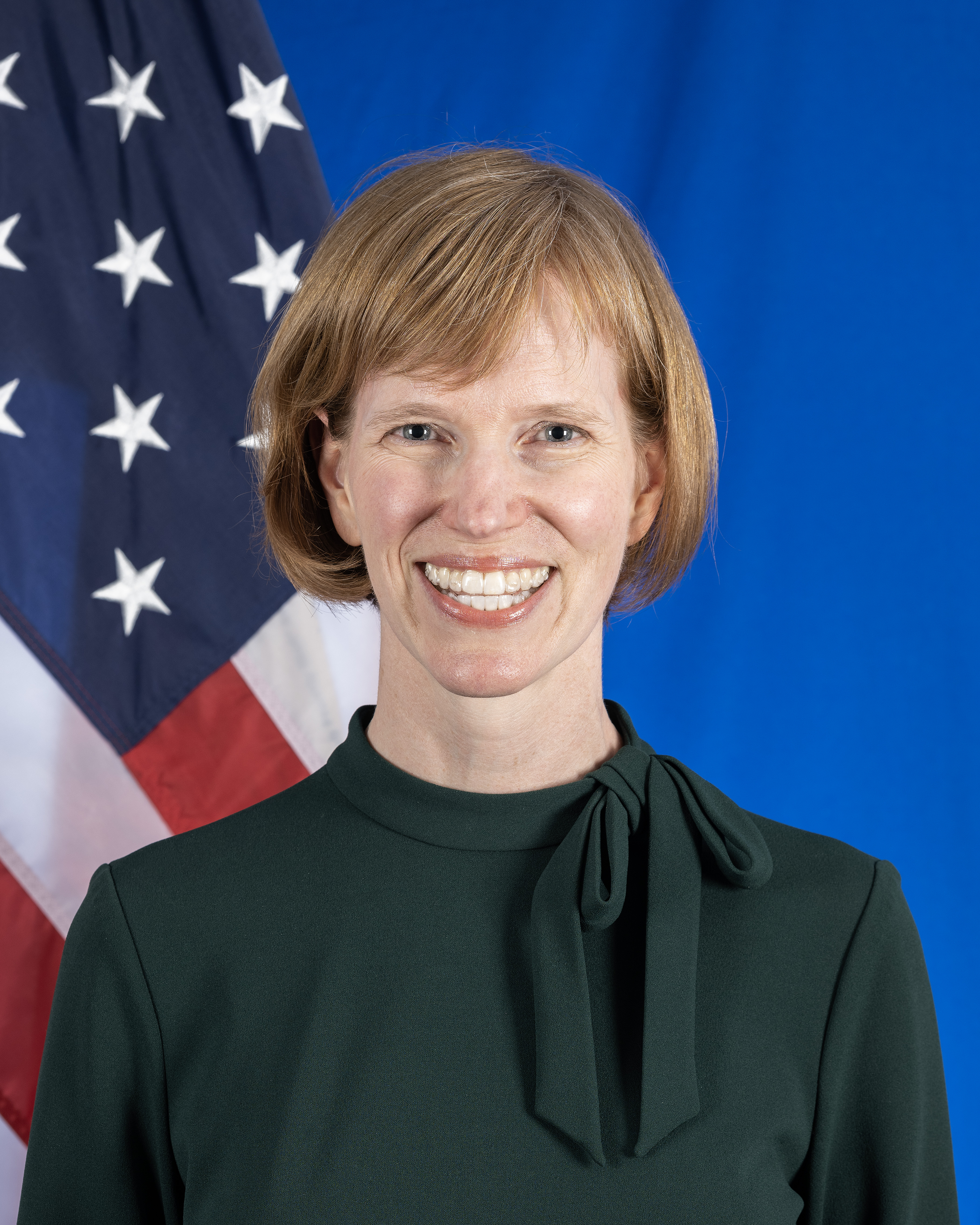
- Incumbent; Carson Relitz Rocker; Chargé d'affaires since January 20, 2026
- Nominator: The president of the United States
- Inaugural holder: Edmund McWilliams as Chargé d'Affaires
- Formation: March 13, 1992
- Website: U.S. Embassy - Dushanbe

This is a list of United States ambassadors to Tajikistan.

Until 1991, Tajikistan had been a constituent republic of the Soviet Union as the Tajik Soviet Socialist Republic. On December 25, 1991, following the dissolution of the Soviet Union, Tajikistan declared its independence and became the Republic of Tajikistan. The United States government recognized Tajikistan on the same day. Diplomatic relations were established on February 19, 1992 in an announcement by President Bush. A temporary embassy was opened by Chargé d'Affaires ad interim Edmund McWilliams on March 13, 1992 in the Avesto Hotel, pending the appointment of an ambassador. The first ranking ambassador was Stanley Tuemler Escudero, who presented his credentials on October 19, 1992.

On October 25, 1992, six days after Ambassador Escudero's arrival, Embassy Dushanbe was closed and all U.S. personnel were withdrawn because of the civil war in Tajikistan. The embassy was reopened on March 11, 1993.

In 1998, after the embassy bombings in Africa, Embassy Dushanbe American personnel were temporarily relocated to Almaty, Kazakhstan, due to heightened Embassy security standards. American Embassy Dushanbe has since returned to full operations and in July 2006 moved into a purpose-built embassy compound.

== Ambassadors ==
Representative	Position Title	From	To	Appointed by
Edmund McWilliams	Chargé d'Affaires	March 13, 1992	October 19, 1992	George H. W. Bush
Stanley Tuemler Escudero	Ambassador Extraordinary and Plenipotentiary	October 19, 1992	June 1, 1995	George H. W. Bush
The embassy was closed October 25, 1992 – March 11, 1993. Escudero continued as the nonresident ambassador in the interim.
R. Grant Smith	Ambassador Extraordinary and Plenipotentiary	July 31, 1995	August 21, 1998	Bill Clinton
Robert Finn	Ambassador Extraordinary and PlenipotentiarY	November 11, 1998	July 13, 2001	Bill Clinton
Franklin Pierce Huddle, Jr.	Ambassador Extraordinary and Plenipotentiary	October 26, 2001	October 9, 2003	George W. Bush
Richard E. Hoagland	Ambassador Extraordinary and Plenipotentiary	November 24, 2003	August 3, 2006	George W. Bush
Tracey Ann Jacobson	Ambassador Extraordinary and Plenipotentiary	September 4, 2006	July 27, 2009	George W. Bush
Kenneth E. Gross, Jr.	Ambassador Extraordinary and Plenipotentiary	October 2, 2009	July 12, 2012	Barack Obama
Susan M. Elliott	Ambassador Extraordinary and Plenipotentiary	October 19, 2012	October 5, 2015	Barack Obama
Elisabeth I. Millard	Ambassador Extraordinary and Plenipotentiary	March 11, 2016	August 31, 2017	Barack Obama
Kevin Covert	Chargé d'Affaires	August 31, 2017	March 15, 2019	Donald Trump
John Pommersheim	Ambassador Extraordinary and Plenipotentiary	March 15, 2019	December 2, 2022	Donald Trump
Manuel P. Micaller	Ambassador Extraordinary and Plenipotentiary	March 9, 2023	January 20, 2026	Joe Biden
Carson Relitz Rocker	Chargé d'Affaires	January 20, 2026	Present	Donald Trump

== See also ==
- Tajikistan – United States relations
- Foreign relations of Tajikistan
- Ambassadors of the United States
