= Elisabeth I. Millard =

American diplomat (born 1954)

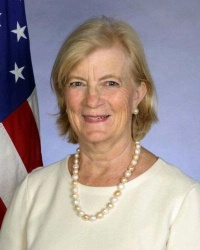

United States Ambassador to Tajikistan
- In office March 11, 2016 – August 31, 2017
- President: Barack Obama; Donald Trump
- Preceded by: Susan M. Elliott
- Succeeded by: John Pommersheim

Personal details
- Born: 1954 (age 71–72)
- Education: University of Geneva; London School of Economics; Johns Hopkins University

Elisabeth I. Millard (born 1954) is an American diplomat who served as Principal Deputy Assistant Secretary for the State Department's Bureau of European and Eurasian Affairs. She served as the United States Ambassador to Tajikistan from January 2016 until September 2017. She was nominated by President Barack Obama on July 7, 2015, and was confirmed by the Senate November 19, 2015. She previously served as Acting Executive Secretary of the Department of State and as Deputy Executive Secretary of the Department of State.

== Early life and education ==
Millard was born Elisabeth Inga Hesselvik to Lennart and Margaretha Hesselvik. As the daughter of a World Health Organization official, she spent her early life in Denmark, Sweden and Tunisia. She studied at the University of Geneva, and earned a B.S. degree from the London School of Economics in 1978. She received an MA from the Johns Hopkins University Paul H. Nitze School of Advanced International Studies in 1981.

== Career ==
Before joining the U.S. State Department, Millard held both private and public sector roles, working at different times for Delphi International, the United States Agency for International Development (USAID) in India, and Continental Illinois National Bank and Trust in Bahrain. She then took the Foreign Service exam and joined the State Department.

After joining the Foreign Service, she was stationed abroad in the Czech Republic, Denmark, India and Nepal. She was named consul general in Casablanca, Morocco in 2008 and in 2011 became Deputy Chief of Mission in Astana, Kazakhstan. At the time she was nominated to become ambassador to Tajikistan, she was serving as on the staff of Secretary of State John Kerry.

After the Senate confirmed her as Ambassador to Tajikistan, she presented her credentials to President Emomali Rahmon on March 11, 2016.

== Personal ==
Millard has five adult children. She was married to Capt. August Millard, a Naval intelligence analyst who died in 2014. In addition to English, she speaks French, Swedish, Danish and Russian.

Diplomatic posts
Preceded by Susan M. Elliott	United States Ambassador to Tajikistan; 2015–2017	Succeeded by John M. Pommersheim
