= Germany–Tajikistan relations =

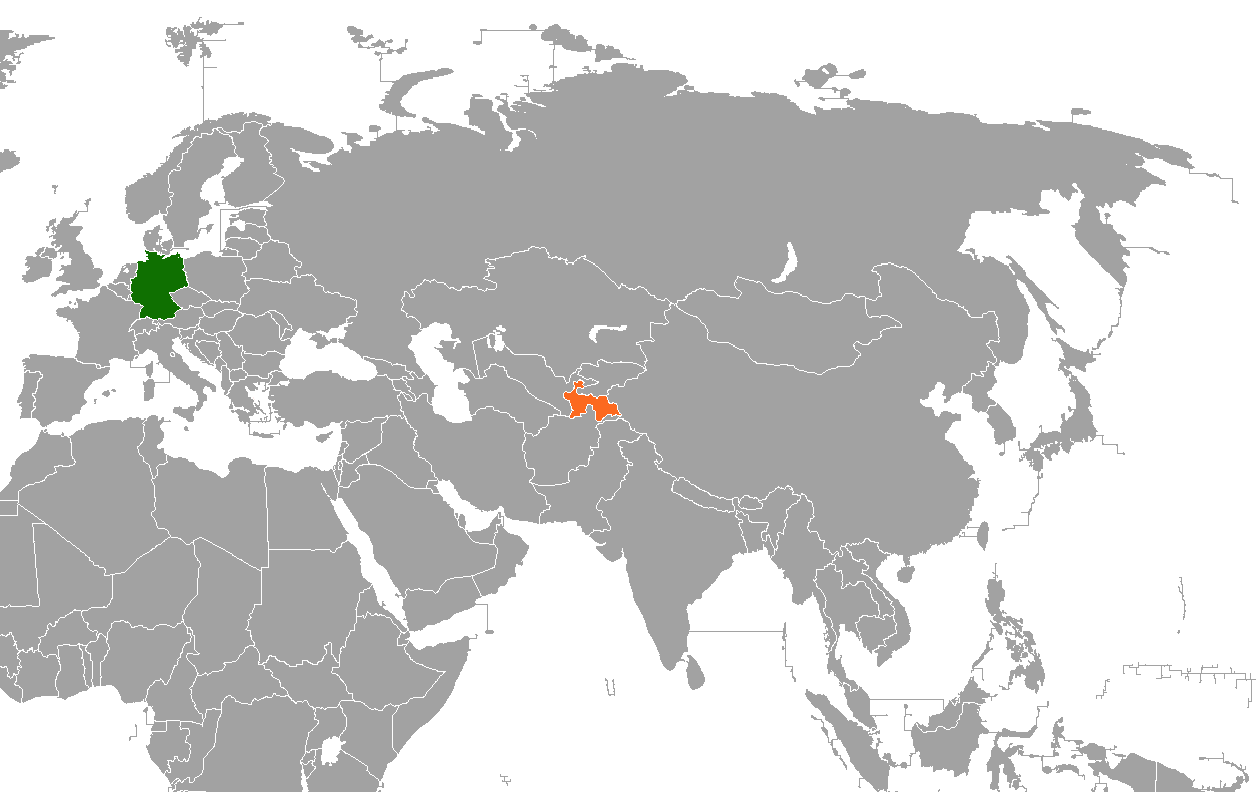

- Germany: Tajikistan

Germany–Tajikistan relations are the diplomatic relations between Tajikistan and Germany.

Germany and Tajikistan have maintained diplomatic relations since 1992. In the same year, both the German Embassy in Dushanbe and the Tajik Embassy in Berlin were opened. Until December 2001, Germany was the only member country of the European Union (EU) with an embassy in the Dushanbe. The German-Tajik Society has existed since 2001 and is based in Berlin.

== History ==
Tajikistan had been a Soviet republic since 1929. In 1989, Tajik became the official language of Tajikistan. In early 1990, the EU, of which Germany was one of the six founding members, began to become active in Central Asia and thus also in Tajikistan. The basis for this was a trade and cooperation agreement with the Soviet Union, signed in 1989 and entered into force in 1990. In 1991, Tajikistan declared its independence from the Soviet Union and shortly thereafter joined the Commonwealth of Independent States (CIS). However, the newly formed Republic of Tajikistan refused to recognize the agreements previously concluded as part of the Soviet Union, as a result of which no agreement could be reached with the EU. Germany, on the other hand, recognized Tajikistan in 1992 and established an embassy in the capital, Dushanbe. Until 2001, Germany was the only EU member state with a permanent representation in Tajikistan.

In 2013, a small upset occurred in the relationship between Tajikistan and Germany. Reports were published in the Federal Republic that the family of the Tajik president was driving luxury limousines that had been stolen in Germany. Tajikistan's foreign office spokesman at the time, Abdulfajs Atoev, immediately rejected these allegations as implausible. However, research by journalist Johannes Edelhoff proved that the accusations were justified.

== German development aid ==
Germany's interests in Central Asia consist mainly of modernizing the infrastructure. Germany's assistance in Central Asia since 1992 has been specifically aimed at building a market economy, promoting the financial and health sectors, and reforming the legal system. The focus in Tajikistan has been on emergency aid, health care and support for agriculture. The primary goal (as of 2005) of the German government in Central Asia is to contribute to sustainable internal and external stabilization, with priority given to poverty reduction. This is also consistent with the goals of the governments in the partner countries, which include Tajikistan. In this context, Germany pledged 150 million euros in development assistance funds. This made Germany the largest bilateral donor of the European Union in Central Asia. The Federal Ministry for Economic Cooperation and Development (BMZ) sees the fight against poverty and the associated crisis prevention and peacekeeping as its main tasks. In 2021 Germany ended official development assistance to the country.

== Economic exchange ==
Economic relations between Germany and Tajikistan are currently at a low level. Imports from Tajikistan, mainly cotton and aluminum, totaled just 2.9 million euros in 2021. Exports to Tajikistan, on the other hand, mainly involving electrical engineering, vehicles, vehicle parts and machinery, reached 32.7 million euros. Tajikistan nevertheless ranks last in Germany's trade with Eastern Europe and Central Asia with a trade volume of 35 million euros.

== Cultural relations ==
=== German minority in Tajikistan ===
After Catherine the Great offered privileges to foreign peasants in the 1760s, a mass resettlement of Germans began in what was then the Russian Empire. In the early 19th century, entire German villages sprang up in northern Tajikistan. During World War II, the number of Germans in Central Asia increased as a result of their deportation to the European part of the Soviet Union. The 1989 census identified about 32,000 Tajik citizens with German roots, of whom about 20,000 listed German as their first language. Since the beginning of the 21st century, however, many thousands of Germans have emigrated from Tajikistan, leaving an estimated 1,500 remaining today.

=== Education ===
In 2010, a language learning center founded by the Goethe-Institut was opened in Dushanbe. The aim is to offer German courses of the highest level. However, the possibility is also offered to acquire basic knowledge in a short time. Some of the school's graduates are studying in Germany. A total of about 65 scholarships are awarded annually, both by the DAAD and the Pedagogical Exchange Service.

== Resident diplomatic missions ==
- Germany has an embassy in Dushanbe.
- Tajikistan has an embassy in Berlin.

== See also ==
- Foreign relations of Germany
- Foreign relations of Tajikistan
