= Manuel P. Micaller =

American diplomat

Manuel P. Micaller Jr.
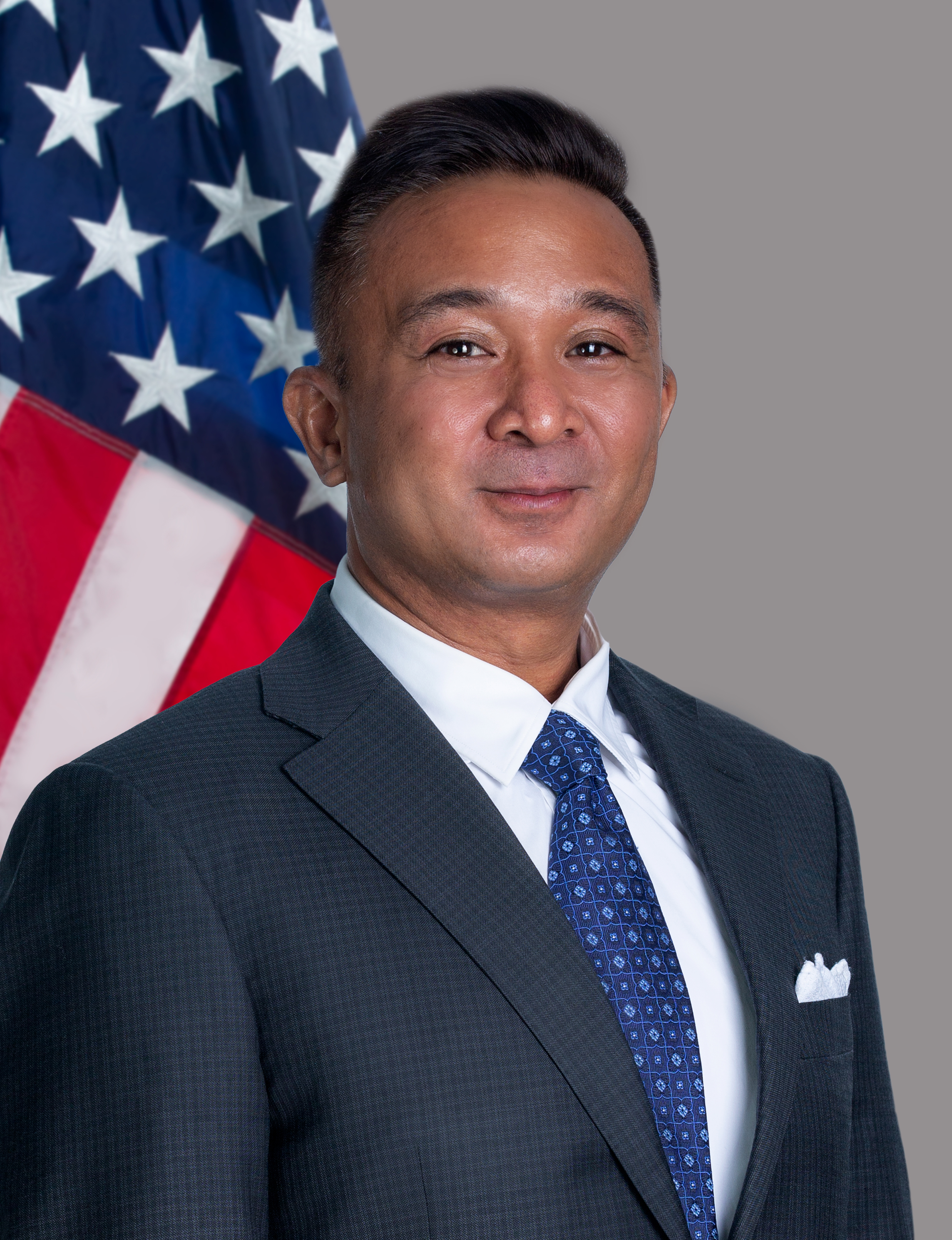

United States Ambassador to Tajikistan
- In office March 9, 2023 – January 20, 2026
- President: Joe Biden; Donald Trump
- Preceded by: John Pommersheim

Personal details
- Education: Johns Hopkins University (BA); George Washington University (MBA); National Defense University (MA)

Manuel P. Micaller Jr. is an American diplomat who had served as United States ambassador to Tajikistan.

== Early life and education ==
Micaller earned his bachelor's degree from Johns Hopkins University and his Master's in Business Administration from George Washington University. He also received a master's degree from the National Defense University.

== Career ==
Micaller is a career member of the Senior Foreign Service, with the rank of Minister-Counselor. He served as the deputy chief of mission of the U.S. embassy in Kathmandu, Nepal. Micaller previously served in the same role, along with being Chargé d'Affaires, ad interim, at the U.S. embassy in Ulaanbaatar, Mongolia. He also served as the deputy director of the Office of India Affairs in the State Department's Bureau of South and Central Asian Affairs in Washington, D.C. and has held assignments as the political – economic section chief at the U.S. embassy in Dushanbe, Tajikistan and as an economic officer in the South and Central Asian Affairs Bureau's Office of Regional Affairs. Micaller was also an economic officer at the U.S. embassy in Rabat, Morocco, worked in the State Department Executive Secretariat and Operations Center, and held positions in Russia and Tajikistan.

=== U.S. ambassador to Tajikistan ===
On June 22, 2022, President Joe Biden nominated Micaller to be the next U.S ambassador to Tajikistan. On November 29, 2022, hearings on his nomination were held before the Senate Foreign Relations Committee. On December 7, 2022, the committee favorably reported his nomination to the Senate. On December 13, 2022, his nomination was confirmed by the Senate by voice vote. He was sworn in by Under Secretary Uzra Zeya on February 13, 2023, and presented his credentials to President Emomali Rahmon on March 9, 2023.

== Personal life ==
Micaller speaks Russian and Tajik.
