= Malaysia–Tajikistan relations =

- Malaysia: Tajikistan

Malaysia–Tajikistan relations are foreign relations between Malaysia and Tajikistan. Malaysian embassy in Tashkent, Uzbekistan is also accredited to Tajikistan, while Tajikistan has an embassy in Ampang, Selangor. Both countries have been enjoying warm diplomatic relations and are willing to make constructive efforts towards progress.

== History ==
Relations between the two countries has been established since 11 March 1992. In 2014, President of Tajikistan Emomali Rahmon together with his wife made an official visit to Malaysia at the invitation of Yang di-Pertuan Agong Tuanku Abdul Halim Mu'adzam Shah.

== Economic relations ==
Trade relations between the two countries recorded a total of $5.5 billion in 2013 and a number of Malaysian firms are keen to explore business opportunities in Tajikistan. Both countries agreed to expand the co-operation mainly in expansion of political, economic, investment, trade, scientific, technical and cultural co-operation as stated by the Prime Minister of Malaysia Najib Razak during his meeting with Emomali. Aside from that, five memorandums of understanding (MoUs) on bilateral consultation, co-operation in the fields of higher education, tourism, physical training and sports, MoU with the Olympic Council of Malaysia (OCM) and the agreement on economic, technical and scientific co-operation were signed. In 2013, Malaysia was expected to build a power plant with a capacity of 300 megawatt in northern Tajikistan.

== Education relations ==
There are more than 200 Tajiks who pursue their study and undergo training at Malaysian universities and educational institutions. Tajikistan's Ministry of Education and Science also have signed an MoU with the Malaysian Limkokwing University of Creative Technology to establish a LUCT branch in Tajikistan.

== Resident diplomatic missions ==
- Malaysia is accredited to Tajikistan from its embassy in Tashkent, Uzbekistan.
- Tajikistan has an embassy in Kuala Lumpur.

== See also ==
- Foreign relations of Malaysia
- Foreign relations of Tajikistan
