= John Pommersheim =

American diplomat

John Mark Pommersheim
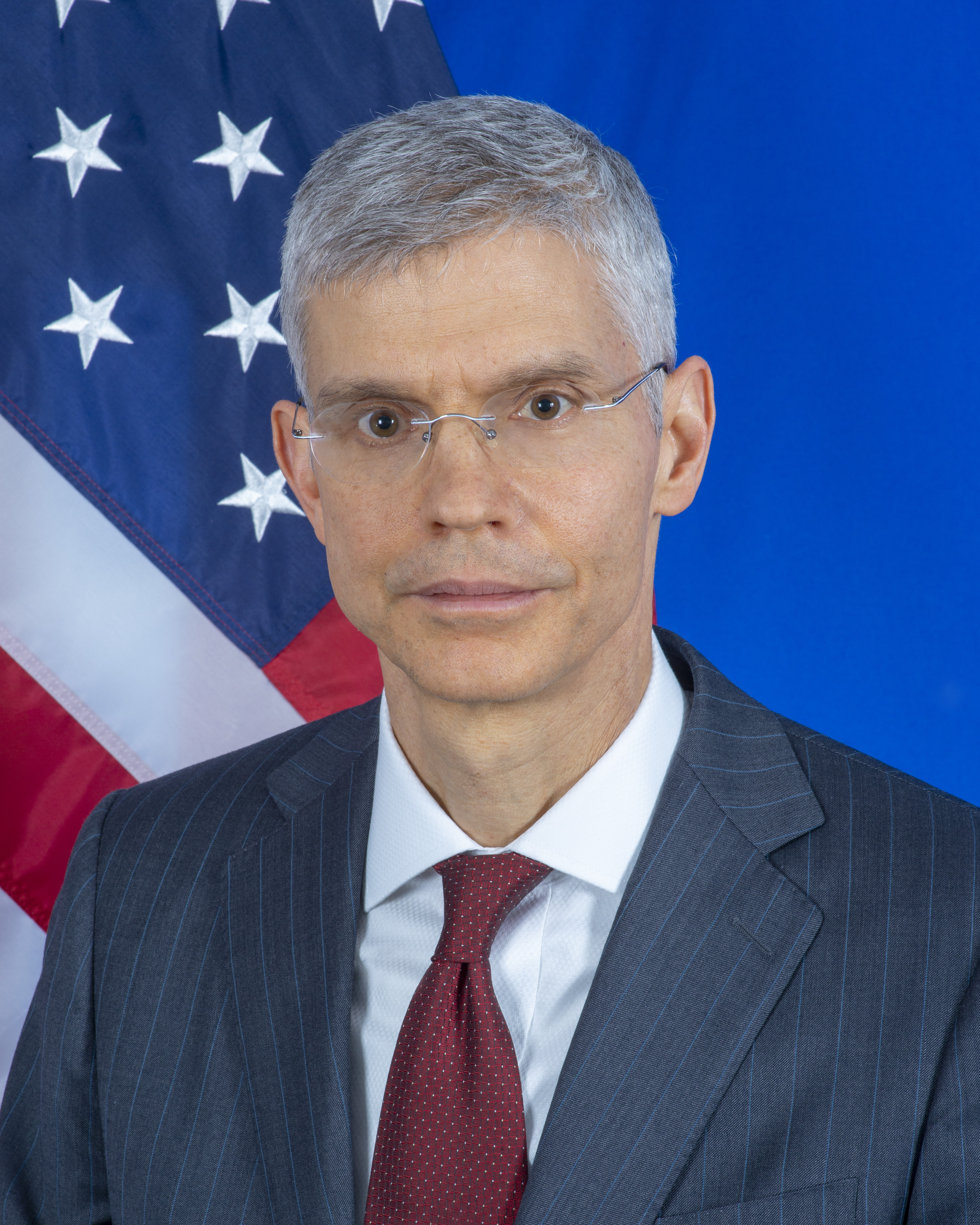

United States Ambassador to Tajikistan
- In office March 15, 2019 – December 2, 2022
- President: Donald Trump; Joe Biden
- Preceded by: Elisabeth I. Millard
- Succeeded by: Manuel P. Micaller

Personal details
- Education: Bucknell University (B.A.); Columbia University (M.A.); Pushkin State Russian Language Institute

John Mark Pommersheim is an American diplomat who served as the United States Ambassador to Tajikistan.

== Education ==
Pommersheim earned a Bachelor of Arts from Bucknell University, a Master of Arts from Columbia University, and studied at the Pushkin State Russian Language Institute on a Department of Defense scholarship.

== Career ==
Pommersheim is a career member of the Senior Foreign Service, class of Counselor. He has served as an American diplomat since 1990. He has served as Consul General/Principal Officer at the United States Consulate in Vladivostok, Russia and at six United States Missions overseas, including in China and Japan. Prior to his appointment as United States Ambassador to Tajikistan, he served as the Deputy Chief of Mission at the United States Embassy in Astana, Kazakhstan.

On September 18, 2018, President Donald Trump nominated Pommersheim to be the next United States Ambassador to Tajikistan. On January 2, 2019, his nomination was confirmed in the United States Senate by voice vote. He was sworn into office on February 22, 2019, and arrived in Tajikistan on March 11, 2019. He presented his credentials to President Emomali Rahmon on March 15, 2019. He was replaced as ambassador by Manuel Micaller, who presented his credentials on March 9, 2023.

== Personal life ==
Pommersheim speaks Russian, German, Japanese, and Chinese.

== See also ==
- List of ambassadors of the United States

Diplomatic posts
| Preceded by Elisabeth I. Millard | United States Ambassador to Tajikistan; 2019–2022 | Succeeded by Manuel Micaller |
