= Armenia–Tajikistan relations =

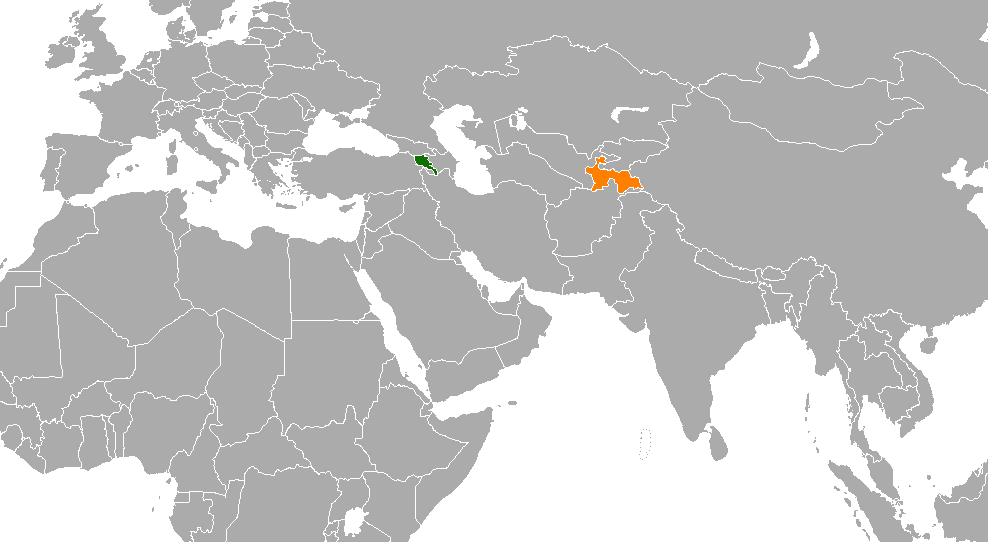

- Armenia: Tajikistan

Bilateral diplomatic relations exist between Armenia and Tajikistan. The two countries are in a number of international and regional organizations, such as the United Nations, the Commonwealth of Independent States, the Collective Security Treaty Organization, and the Eurasian Economic Union. Armenia is represented in Tajikistan through its embassy in Astana, Kazakhstan. Tajikistan is represented in Armenia through its embassy in Moscow, Russia. There is a small community of Armenians in Tajikistan, with many of the original population having left the country following the collapse of the Soviet Union and the following civil war in Tajikistan.

== History ==
The first Armenians are believed to have arrived in Tajikistan in the 1930s. Many anti-Armenian prejudice occurred by the start of the 1990s, such as the 1990 Dushanbe riots which were sparked by an unfounded rumour that Armenian refugees would be resettled there and get free housing during a housing shortages.

Diplomatic relations were established on 12 October 1992. The founding document for diplomatic relations was the Treaty of Friendship and Cooperation between the Republic of Tajikistan and the Republic of Armenia.

== Cultural relations ==
There is currently one Armenian cultural union in the country, called the Mesrop Mashtots Armenian Community formed in Dushanbe in 1989. It was founded and led by honored coach of the Tajik SSR Telman Gurgen Voskanyan for 20 years. An Armenian day school and dance ensemble were founded in 2009.

== Economic relations ==
Coordinating economic relations between Tajikistan and Armenia is the Tajik-Armenian Intergovernmental Commission on Trade and Economic Cooperation. In 1994, the volume of foreign trade turnover was equal to 239,000 US dollars. In 2000, it amounted to only 1,000 dollars. In 2014, the volume of trade between the countries amounted to almost 1 million US dollars.

== High-level mutual state visits ==
Guest	Host	Place of visit	Date of visit
(Armenia) President Robert Kocharyan	(Tajikistan) President Emomali Rahmon	Dushanbe	April 2002
(Tajikistan) President Emomali Rahmon	(Armenia) President Robert Kocharyan	Yerevan	2003
(Tajikistan) President Emomali Rahmon	(Armenia) President Robert Kocharyan	Yerevan	2004
(Tajikistan) President Emomali Rahmon	(Armenia) President Robert Kocharyan	Yerevan	2005
(Tajikistan) President Emomali Rahmon	(Armenia) President Serzh Sargsyan	Yerevan	2010
(Armenia) President Serzh Sargsyan	(Tajikistan) President Emomali Rahmon	Dushanbe	August 2011
(Armenia) President Serzh Sargsyan	(Tajikistan) President Emomali Rahmon	Dushanbe	September 2015
(Tajikistan) President Emomali Rahmon	(Armenia) President Serzh Sargsyan	Yerevan	2017
(Armenia) Prime Minister Nikol Pashinyan	(Tajikistan) President Emomali Rahmon	Dushanbe	September 2018

== See also ==
- Foreign relations of Armenia
- Foreign relations of Tajikistan
- Armenians in Tajikistan
