= Tajikistan–Ukraine relations =

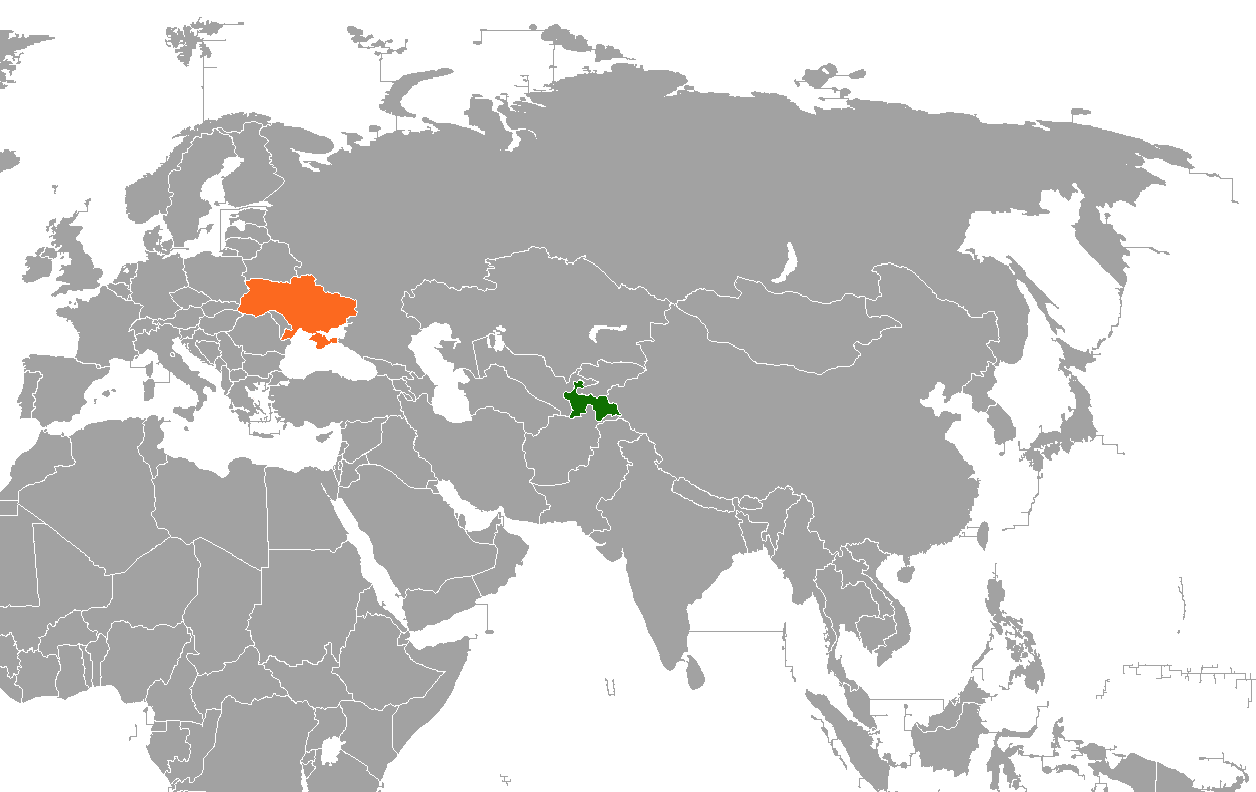

- Tajikistan: Ukraine

Tajikistan–Ukraine relations refers to the bilateral diplomatic relations between Ukraine and the Republic of Tajikistan. Tajikistan has an embassy in Kyiv, Ukraine has an embassy in Dushanbe. Diplomatic relations were established on April 24, 1993. Bilateral relations are based on a Treaty of Friendship and Cooperation between the Republic of Tajikistan and Ukraine, signed on July 6, 2001. Tajik students have been trained in higher educational institutions of Ukraine.

== Economic cooperation ==
Ukrainian enterprises, companies and organizations have participated in the implementation of hydropower development, the construction of transmission lines, and the establishment of joint ventures in the oil and gas industries. In 2009, the Joint Intergovernmental Ukrainian-Tajik Commission for Economic Cooperation was established, where agreements in the trade, economic, energy, transport and humanitarian spheres take place.

== Ambassadors ==
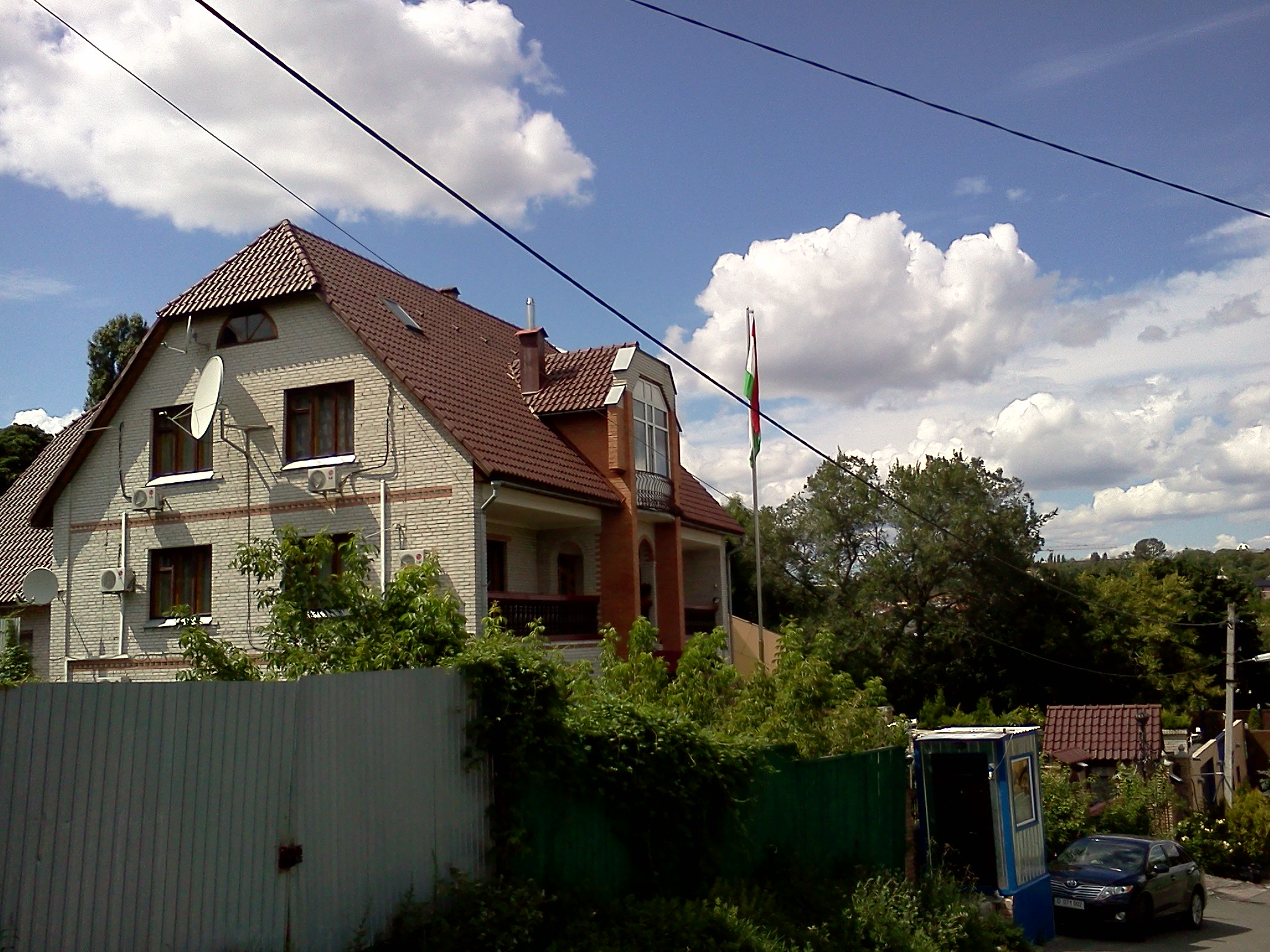
The Embassy of Tajikistan in Kyiv.

=== Ambassadors of Ukraine in Tajikistan ===
- Safar Safarov (2001–2007)
- Abdulmajid Dostiev (2008–2010)
- Shukhrat Sultonov (2010–2015)
- Faizullo Kholboboev (2015–present)

== High-level visits ==
Guest	Host	Place of visit	Date of visit
(Tajikistan) President Emomali Rahmon	(Ukraine) President Leonid Kuchma	Kyiv	July 5–6, 2001
(Ukraine) President Leonid Kuchma	(Tajikistan) President Emomali Rahmon	Dushanbe	April 8–10, 2003
(Ukraine) President Viktor Yushchenko	(Tajikistan) President Emomali Rahmon	Dushanbe	March 6–7, 2008
(Tajikistan) President Emomali Rahmon	(Ukraine) President Viktor Yushchenko	Kyiv	December 3–5, 2008
(Ukraine) President Viktor Yanukovych	(Tajikistan) President Emomali Rahmon	Dushanbe	September 3, 2011
(Tajikistan) President Emomali Rahmon	(Ukraine) President Viktor Yanukovych	Kyiv	December 15–16, 2011
(Tajikistan) President Emomali Rahmon	(Ukraine) President Viktor Yanukovych	Kyiv	July 2, 2012

== See also ==
- Foreign relations of Tajikistan
- Foreign relations of Ukraine
