= Kazakhstan–Tajikistan relations =

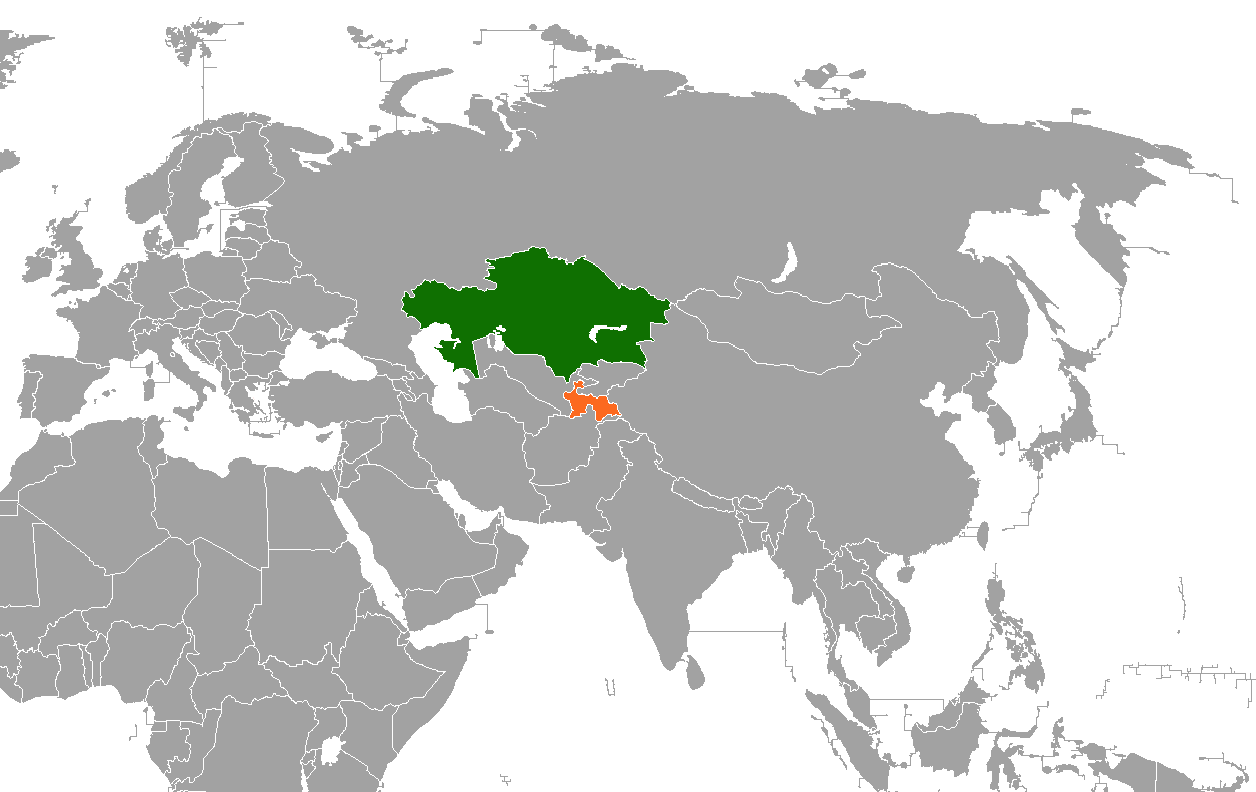

- Kazakhstan: Tajikistan

Relations between Kazakhstan and Tajikistan began on 7 January 1993. Both countries are members of the Commonwealth of Independent States. Kazakhstan maintains an embassy in Dushanbe and a consulate in Khujand. Tajikistan has an embassy in Astana. The current Tajik ambassador to Kazakhstan is Akbarsho Iskandrov. Both countries are post Soviet states.

== History ==
The embassy of Tajikistan has been operating in Astana since June 1993. The diplomatic mission of Kazakhstan in Dushanbe began functioning in April 1998, although it received embassy status in January 2001. The official opening of the Embassy of Kazakhstan in Tajikistan took place on 5 October 2002, with the participation of Kazakh President Nursultan Nazarbayev.

Tajikistan's President Emomali Rahmon paid an official visit to the Kazakh capital in 1993, during which the Treaty on the Foundations of Relations between the Republic of Tajikistan and the Republic of Kazakhstan was signed. Subsequent visits by the Tajik leader to Kazakhstan took place in 1995, 2006, and 2008. Official visits by President Nursultan Nazarbayev of Kazakhstan to Tajikistan were held in June 2000 and September 2007.

In 1995, the Intergovernmental Commission on Trade and Economic Cooperation was established. Its sessions, held in 1998, 2001, 2004, 2006, 2007, 2008, 2009, 2010, and 2011 in the capitals of both Kazakhstan and Tajikistan, played an important role in strengthening bilateral relations.

The treaty and legal framework of cooperation between Tajikistan and Kazakhstan consists of 75 documents signed between 1993 and 2011, of which 50 remain in force, covering most areas of interaction between the two countries.

== Economic cooperation ==
Tajikistan exports electricity, cotton, aluminum products, and textile materials to Kazakhstan, while importing grain, flour products, and petroleum from Kazakhstan.

In 2007, during the visit of President Nursultan Nazarbayev to Dushanbe, an agreement was reached to establish the Kazakhstan–Tajikistan Direct Investment Fund.

By 2013, trade turnover between the two republics had exceeded US$700 million, and both sides expressed their intention to increase this figure to US$1 billion.

== Bilateral agreements ==
Kazakh Export Chairman Aslan Kaligazin signed bilateral agreements with the major banks of Tajikistan for cooperation and to increase the exports of non-commodity goods from Kazakhstan.

== High-level mutual state visits ==
Guest	Host	Place of visit	Date of visit
President of the Republic of Tajikistan Emomali Rahmon	(Kazakhstan)	Astana	January 1993
President of the Republic of Kazakhstan Nursultan Nazarbayev	(Tajikistan) President Emomali Rahmon	Dushanbe	2003

== See also ==
- Foreign relations of Kazakhstan
- Foreign relations of Tajikistan
