= Tajikistan–Turkey relations =

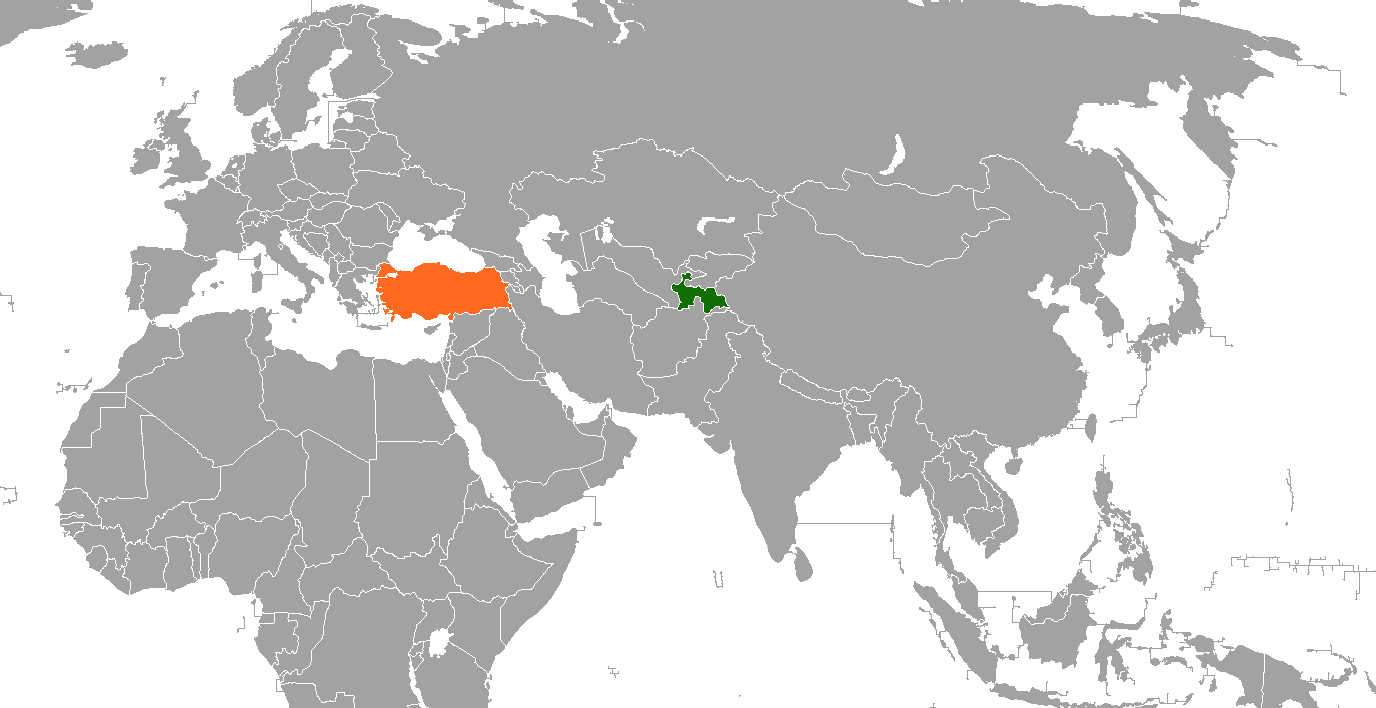

- Tajikistan: Turkey

Diplomatic mission
- Tajik embassy, Ankara: Turkish embassy, Dushanbe

Tajikistan–Turkey relations (Tajik: Муносибатҳои Тоҷикистон бо Туркия; Turkish: Tacikistan-Türkiye ilişkileri) are friendly and cooperative and underlined with a legal basis of more than 30 treaties and protocols which have been signed between two countries since 1991.

== Country comparison ==
	Tajikistan	Turkey
Flag	Tajikistan	Turkey
State Emblem / National Emblem		
Population	9,537,645	83,154,997
Area	143,100 km2 (55,300 sq mi)	783,356 km2 (302,455 sq mi)
Population density	48.6/km2 (125.9/sq mi)	105/km2 (271.9/sq mi)
Capital	Dushanbe	Ankara
Government	Unitary dominant-party presidential constitutional secular republic	Unitary presidential constitutional republic
Current Leader	President Emomali Rahmon; Prime Minister Kokhir Rasulzoda	President Recep Tayyip Erdoğan; Vice President Fuat Oktay
Official languages	Tajik	Turkish
Main religions	96.7% Islam, 1.6% Christianity	89.5% Islam, 8.9% non-religious, 1.6% other
Ethnic groups	79.8% Tajiks, 13.9% Uzbeks	85% Turkish, 9% Kurdish 6% Others
Human Development Index (HDI)	0.668 (medium) — 125th	0.820 (very high) — 54th
GDP (PPP)	$30.547 billion ($3,354 per capita)	$2.464 trillion ($29,326 per capita)

== Modern relations ==
Turkey recognized the independence of Tajikistan on 16 December 1991 and established diplomatic relations on 29 January 1992. The Turkish Embassy in Dushanbe was opened on 4 August 1992 and the Tajik Embassy in Ankara was opened on 16 October 1995.

Turkey's relations with Tajikistan are considered within the framework of relations with other Central Asian republics but developed more slowly due to Tajikistan's internal war between 1992 and 1997. During this period the Turkish embassy in Dushanbe was the only diplomatic mission which remained open and the visit of Turkish Prime Minister Suleyman Demirel was the only high level visit to Tajikistan.

Tajik President Emomali Rahmon made a 19–22 January 2006 official visit to Turkey.

=== Turkish Presidential visit to Dushanbe ===
Turkish President Abdullah Gül made a 29 June 2009 official visit to Dushanbe where he met with Tajik President Rahmon to discuss bilateral relations, with Gül reiterating the two countries common stance on “terrorism, extremist movements, illegal immigration, drug and arms smuggling, organised crime and the proliferation of weapons of mass destruction,” before concentrating on Afghanistan (as he had done in his preceding visit to Kyrgyzstan) by stating, “Afghanistan’s stability and peace is very important for Central Asia and the rest of the world. Tajikistan, which shares a land border of 1,400 kilometres with Afghanistan, has always played a constructive role in this regard.”

== Group 24 ==
The founder of the Tajik Group 24 opposition movement, Umarali Quvatov, was assassinated in Turkey in March 2015. Turkey detained two members of Group 24, Suhrobi Zafar and Nasim Sharipov, but did not extradite them due to the Constitutional Court of Turkey ruling that they may face torture in Tajikistan.

== See also ==
- Foreign relations of Tajikistan
- Foreign relations of Turkey
