= Bangladesh–Tajikistan relations =

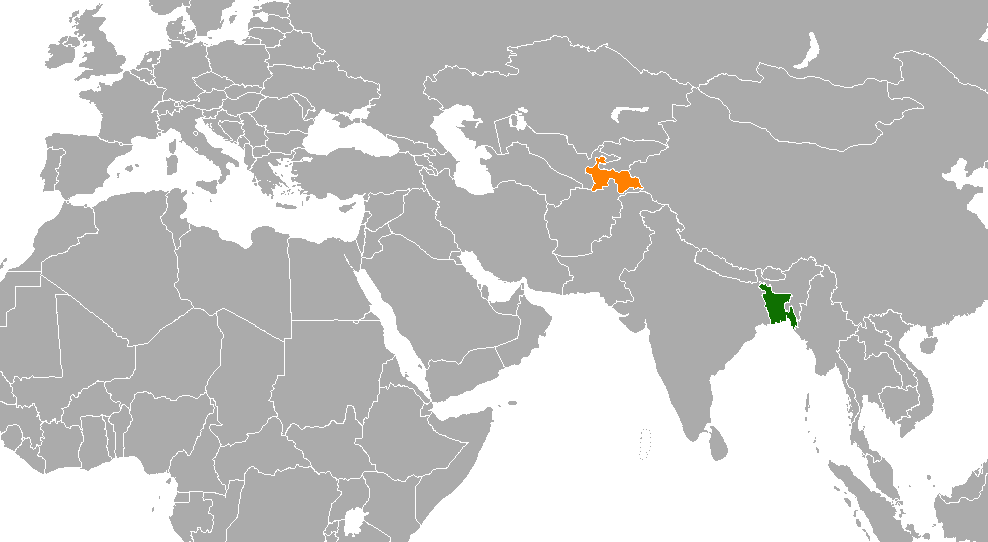

- Bangladesh: Tajikistan

Bangladesh and Tajikistan have warm diplomatic relations with willingness to strengthen it further.

== High level visits ==
Then foreign minister of Bangladesh Dipu Moni paid a visit to Dushanbe in 2013.

== Cooperation in disaster management ==
Because of Bangladesh's vast experience in disaster management, Tajikistan has sought Bangladesh's cooperation in this field. Bangladesh has been sending its experts to Tajikistan to serve technical cooperation for several flood risk management projects in Tajikistan.

== Economic cooperation ==
Bangladesh and Tajikistan have shown mutual interest to expand the economic activities between the two countries. Bangladeshi investors have shown their interest in investing in the sectors of light industry and cotton. In 2007, a Bangladeshi firm COSMOTEX established cotton and leather processing plants in Tajikistan.

Bangladeshi ready made garments and pharmaceuticals have been identified as products with high potentials in Tajikistan's market. In 2013, Bangladesh and Tajikistan signed a deal on trade and economic cooperation in order to expand bilateral economic activities between the two countries.

== See also ==
- Foreign relations of Bangladesh
- Foreign relations of Tajikistan
