= Tajikistan–United States relations =

- Tajikistan: United States

Tajikistan–United States relations are bilateral relations between Tajikistan and the United States that began on 14 February 1992.

According to the 2012 U.S. Global Leadership Report, 44% of Tajiks approve of U.S. leadership, with 38% disapproving and 18% uncertain.

== Overview ==
The United States remains committed to assisting Tajikistan in its economic and political development, as Tajikistan continues to recover from its civil war legacy. U.S. assistance efforts are evolving away from humanitarian aid and political reconciliation, as those needs increasingly have been met. Instead, their efforts are targeted toward broader goals of democratic and economic reforms.

U.S.–Tajik relations have developed considerably since September 11, 2001. The two countries now have a broad-based relationship, cooperating in such areas as counter-narcotics, counter-terrorism, non-proliferation, and regional growth and stability. In light of the Russian border forces' withdrawal from the Tajik–Afghan border, the U.S. Government leads an international donor effort to enhance Tajikistan's territorial integrity, prevent the transit of narcotics and material or technology related to weapons of mass destruction (WMD), and support a stable, peaceful Tajikistan in order to prevent the spread of influence and activities of radical groups and terrorists.

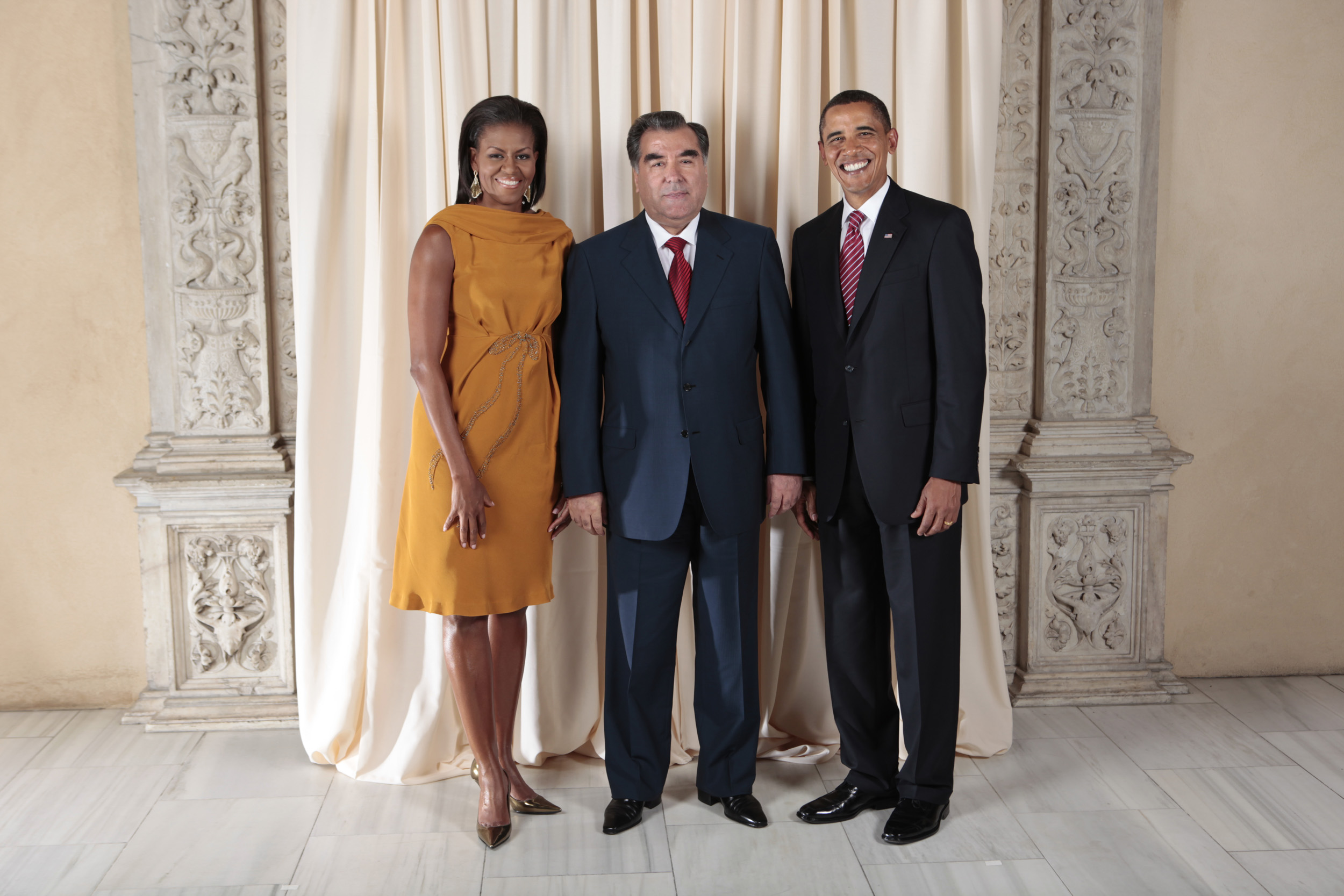
Tajik President Emomalii Rahmon meeting with U.S. President Barack Obama and First Lady Michelle Obama in New York City in September 2009.

They continue to assist Tajikistan on economic reforms and integration into the broader global marketplace, for example in pursuing World Trade Organization (WTO) accession. Tajikistan has been a strong supporter of U.S. efforts in the war on terrorism and in promoting peace and stability in Afghanistan.

A U.S. Government-funded $36 million bridge over the Panj River connects Sher Khan Bandar in Afghanistan with Nizhniy Pyanzh in Tajikistan, which transport more than 150 trucks or 1,000 cars daily. The bridge enhance economic and commercial opportunities on both sides of the river, allowing goods and people to move across more easily. On the Afghan side, the bridge road will connect to the Afghan Ring Road, which is being built with international assistance primarily via the Asian Development Bank.

The United States recognized Tajikistan on December 26, 1991, the day the U.S.S.R. dissolved, and opened a temporary Embassy in a hotel in the capital, Dushanbe, in March 1992. After the bombings of U.S. Embassies in Africa in 1998, Embassy Dushanbe American personnel were temporarily relocated to Almaty, Kazakhstan, due to heightened Embassy security standards. American Embassy Dushanbe has since returned to full operations and in July 2006 moved into a purpose-built Embassy compound.

== Resident diplomatic missions ==
- Tajikistan has an embassy in Washington, D.C.
- United States has an embassy in Dushanbe.

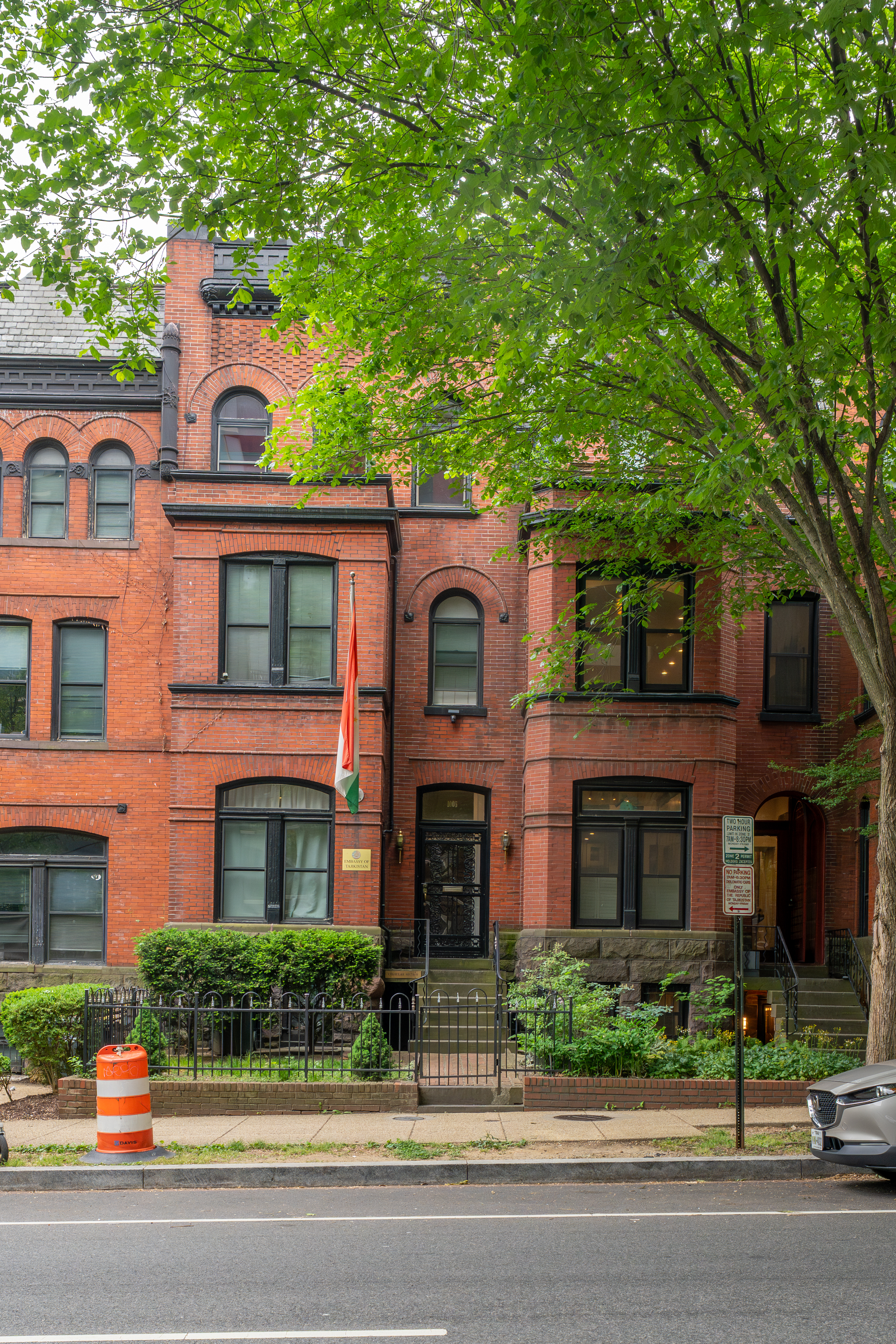
Embassy of Tajikistan in Washington, D.C.

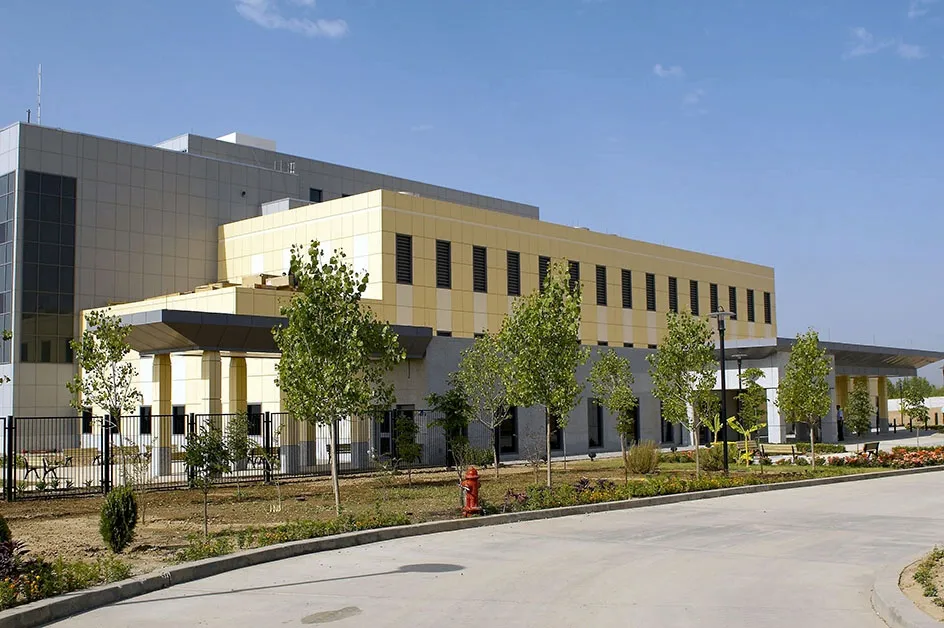
Embassy of the United States in Dushanbe

== See also ==
- Tajik Americans
- Foreign relations of Tajikistan
- List of ambassadors of Tajikistan to the United States
