= List of diplomatic missions in Tajikistan =

This is a list of diplomatic missions in Tajikistan. The country has taken on more prominence in recent times due to its territory being used for basing and transit purposes during the War in Afghanistan against the Taliban. At present, the capital of Dushanbe hosts 24 embassies.

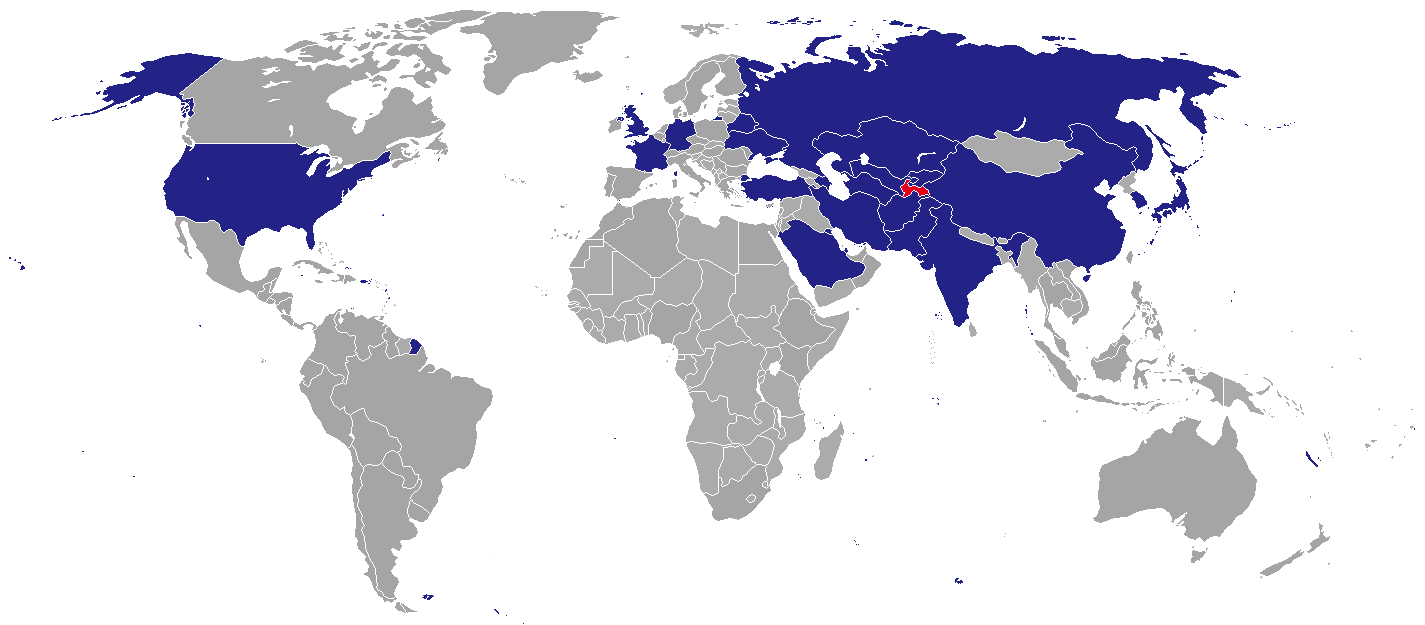
Map of diplomatic missions in Tajikistan

== Diplomatic missions in Dushanbe ==
=== Embassies ===
1. Azerbaijan
2. Belarus
3. China
4. France
5. Germany
6. India
7. Iran
8. Japan
9. Kazakhstan
10. Kuwait
11. Kyrgyzstan
12. Pakistan
13. Palestine
14. Qatar
15. Russia
16. Saudi Arabia
17. South Korea
18. Turkey
19. Turkmenistan
20. Ukraine
21. United Arab Emirates
22. United Kingdom
23. United States
24. Uzbekistan

=== Other delegations or missions ===
1. European Union (Delegation)
2. United Nations (Resident Coordinator's Office)

== Consular Missions ==
=== Khujand ===
1. Kazakhstan (Consulate)

== Non-resident embassies accredited ==
=== Resident in Astana, Kazakhstan ===
1. Armenia
2. Austria
3. Belgium
4. Canada
5. Croatia
6. Cuba
7. Estonia
8. Holy See
9. Hungary
10. Indonesia
11. Iraq
12. Lithuania
13. Mongolia
14. Morocco
15. Netherlands
16. Portugal>
17. Romania
18. South Africa
19. Spain
20. Switzerland
21. Thailand

=== Resident in Islamabad, Pakistan ===
1. Argentina
2. Bahrain
3. Brazil
4. Ethiopia
5. Jordan
6. Philippines
7. Sri Lanka

=== Resident in Moscow, Russia ===
1. Australia
2. Angola
3. Colombia
4. Chile
5. Cyprus
6. Denmark
7. Egypt
8. Greece
9. Ireland
10. Libya
11. Moldova
12. Nepal
13. New Zealand
14. Paraguay
15. Senegal
16. Serbia
17. Slovenia
18. Tanzania

=== Resident in Tashkent, Uzbekistan ===
1. Algeria
2. Bangladesh
3. Czechia
4. Georgia
5. Israel
6. Italy
7. Latvia
8. Malaysia
9. Poland
10. Slovakia

=== Resident in Tehran, Iran ===
1. Bosnia and Herzegovina
2. Ghana
3. Mexico
4. Oman
5. Venezuela

=== Resident elsewhere ===
1. Finland (Helsinki)
2. Seychelles (Abu Dhabi)
3. Somalia (Ankara)
4. Sweden (Stockholm)

=== Unconfirmed ===
1. Bulgaria (Astana)
2. Cambodia (Ankara)
3. Central African Republic (Moscow)
4. Costa Rica (Moscow/New York City)
5. Cape Verde (Moscow)
6. Chad (Moscow)
7. Comoros (Abu Dhabi)
8. Haiti (Seoul)
9. Honduras (Seoul)
10. Iceland (Moscow)
11. Jamaica (Beijing)
12. Kenya (Moscow)
13. Laos (Moscow)
14. Lebanon (Astana)
15. Lesotho (New Delhi)
16. Mali (Moscow)
17. Maldives (New Delhi)
18. Panama (Moscow)
19. Sierra Leone (Tehran)
20. Sudan (Moscow)
21. Syria (Moscow)
22. Taiwan (Ankara)
23. Togo (New Delhi)
24. Tunisia (Moscow)
25. Uruguay (Moscow)
26. Uganda (Tehran)
27. Vietnam (Moscow)
28. Yemen (Islamabad)
29. Zambia (Moscow)
30. Zimbabwe (Tehran)

== Closed missions ==
| Host city | Sending country | Mission | Year closed | Ref. |
|---|---|---|---|---|
| Dushanbe | Afghanistan | Embassy | 2026 | |

== Missions to open ==
| Host city | Sending country | Mission | Ref. |
|---|---|---|---|
| Dushanbe | Indonesia | Embassy | |

== See also ==
- Foreign relations of Tajikistan
- List of diplomatic missions of Tajikistan
