= Susan M. Elliott =

American diplomat

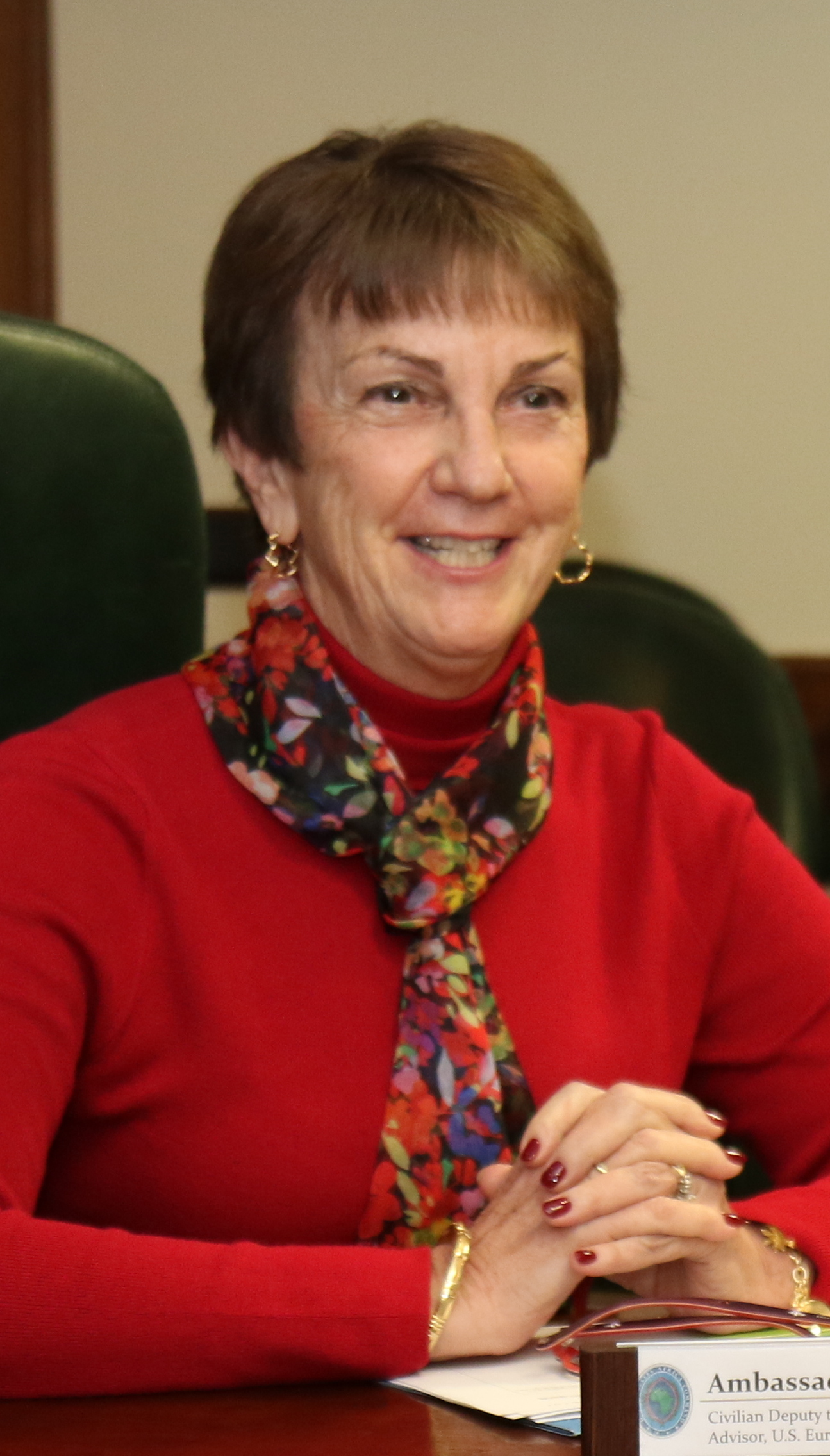
- Education: Skidmore College (BS), Russell Sage College (MS), Indiana University Bloomington (Doctor of Nursing Science)
- Occupations: Think tank executive, former diplomat
- Employer: National Committee on American Foreign Policy

Susan M. Elliott is an American diplomat currently serving as president and CEO of The National Committee on American Foreign Policy (NCAFP) (since August 2018). Elliott is a retired Foreign Service Officer who was the U.S. Ambassador to Tajikistan from 2012 to 2015.

== Education ==
Elliot holds a BS from Skidmore College, a MS from Russell Sage College, and a Doctor of Nursing Science from Indiana University Bloomington in 1987. Before joining the Foreign Service, Elliot served on the faculties of Ball State University and the University of Virginia.

== Foreign service career ==
Elliott served as the Civilian Deputy and Foreign Policy Advisor to the Commander of the United States European Command (2015-2017). Before being appointed as Ambassador, Elliot was the Deputy Assistant Secretary of State in the Bureau of South and Central Asian Affairs.

While Ambassador, Elliot's primary concerns were counterterrorism, border security, and working on “counter-narcotics.”
