= Foreign relations of Tajikistan =

Foreign relations of Tajikistan are based on a desire to secure foreign investment and promote regional security while ensuring Tajikistan's independence. Sirojiddin Muhriddin is the current Foreign’s Minister of Tajikistan.

== Disputes ==
Outstanding boundary negotiations include talks begun with Uzbekistan to demine and delimit borders; however, disputes in Isfara Valley delay completion of delimitation with Kyrgyzstan.

== Diplomatic relations ==
List of countries which Tajikistan maintains diplomatic relations with:

#	Country	Date
1	Australia	26 December 1991
2	China	4 January 1992
3	Iran	9 January 1992
4	Mexico	14 January 1992
5	United Kingdom	15 January 1992
6	Denmark	21 January 1992
7	Turkey	29 January 1992
8	Japan	2 February 1992
9	North Korea	5 February 1992
10	Poland	11 February 1992
11	United States	19 February 1992
12	Saudi Arabia	22 February 1992
13	Finland	26 February 1992
14	Cyprus	27 February 1992
15	Germany	28 February 1992
16	Bangladesh	1 March 1992
17	France	3 March 1992
—	State of Palestine	6 March 1992
18	Malaysia	11 March 1992
19	Austria	25 March 1992
20	Cuba	25 March 1992
21	Philippines	25 March 1992
22	Israel	26 March 1992
23	Canada	28 March 1992
24	Syria	29 March 1992
25	Russia	8 April 1992
26	Mongolia	24 April 1992
27	Ukraine	24 April 1992
28	South Korea	27 April 1992
29	Belgium	29 April 1992
30	South Africa	5 May 1992
31	Italy	15 May 1992
32	Luxembourg	22 May 1992
33	Azerbaijan	29 May 1992
34	Czech Republic	5 June 1992
35	Pakistan	6 June 1992
36	Norway	29 June 1992
37	Hungary	2 July 1992
38	Vietnam	14 July 1992
39	Afghanistan	15 July 1992
40	Romania	20 July 1992
41	Netherlands	27 July 1992
42	Portugal	4 August 1992
43	Spain	4 August 1992
44	Thailand	5 August 1992
45	Lithuania	13 August 1992
46	India	28 August 1992
47	Greece	30 September 1992
48	Armenia	12 October 1992
49	Uzbekistan	22 October 1992
50	Sweden	9 December 1992
51	Switzerland	9 December 1992
52	Kazakhstan	7 January 1993
53	Kyrgyzstan	14 January 1993
54	Moldova	26 January 1993
55	Turkmenistan	27 January 1993
56	Slovakia	4 February 1993
57	Chad	27 February 1993
58	Egypt	1 April 1993
59	Madagascar	12 June 1993
60	Bulgaria	14 June 1993
61	Maldives	6 October 1993
62	Mali	15 October 1993
63	Ghana	2 November 1993
64	Albania	22 December 1993
65	Guinea	27 December 1993
66	Latvia	5 April 1994
67	Georgia	4 August 1994
68	Indonesia	27 August 1994
69	Qatar	13 December 1994
70	Morocco	15 December 1994
71	Kuwait	31 March 1995
72	Bahrain	20 May 1995
73	Zambia	31 October 1995
74	Serbia	8 November 1995
75	Cambodia	29 November 1995
76	Iraq	30 November 1995
77	Singapore	8 December 1995
78	United Arab Emirates	18 December 1995
79	North Macedonia	4 January 1996
80	Brazil	29 March 1996
—	Holy See	15 June 1996
81	Lebanon	21 June 1996
82	Bolivia	9 August 1996
83	Belarus	5 September 1996
84	Bosnia and Herzegovina	12 January 1997
85	Yemen	25 February 1997
86	Algeria	10 June 1997
87	Laos	1 October 1997
88	Libya	27 April 1998
89	Uruguay	1 October 1998
90	Croatia	1 April 1999
91	El Salvador	7 April 1999
92	Myanmar	29 September 1999
93	Peru	21 January 2000
94	Ireland	18 July 2000
95	Costa Rica	28 February 2001
96	Sri Lanka	26 April 2001
—	Sovereign Military Order of Malta	1 June 2001
97	Argentina	14 September 2001
98	Slovenia	4 April 2002
99	Brunei	2 June 2004
100	Somalia	28 July 2004
101	Chile	15 December 2004
102	Uganda	8 September 2005
103	Nepal	13 September 2005
104	Sudan	17 September 2005
105	Eritrea	19 September 2005
106	Timor-Leste	4 October 2005
107	Venezuela	5 October 2005
108	Saint Lucia	5 October 2005
109	Iceland	14 February 2006
110	Estonia	23 February 2006
111	Cameroon	3 March 2006
112	Tunisia	19 June 2006
113	Montenegro	3 August 2006
114	Guatemala	22 August 2006
115	Paraguay	30 August 2007
116	Malta	25 September 2007
117	Andorra	9 November 2007
118	Oman	15 November 2007
119	Liechtenstein	28 January 2008
120	Marshall Islands	18 February 2010
121	Dominican Republic	25 May 2010
122	Fiji	20 July 2010
123	Antigua and Barbuda	12 April 2011
124	Dominica	13 April 2011
125	Benin	8 July 2011
126	Tuvalu	1 September 2011
127	Burkina Faso	12 January 2012
128	Jordan	13 January 2012
129	Solomon Islands	21 February 2012
130	Ethiopia	3 July 2012
131	Colombia	5 October 2012
132	New Zealand	5 April 2013
133	Bhutan	24 January 2013
134	Mozambique	5 September 2013
135	Ivory Coast	2 March 2016
136	Togo	2 March 2016
137	Haiti	9 March 2016
138	Nicaragua	30 March 2016
139	Ecuador	12 July 2016
140	Monaco	13 January 2017
141	Djibouti	17 March 2017
142	Mauritius	10 May 2017
143	Republic of the Congo	13 June 2017
144	Niger	26 August 2017
145	Grenada	13 October 2017
146	Bahamas	5 December 2017
147	Jamaica	11 December 2017
148	Gambia	18 December 2017
149	Saint Vincent and the Grenadines	18 December 2017
150	Nauru	20 December 2017
151	Belize	21 December 2017
152	Samoa	22 December 2017
153	Seychelles	28 December 2017
154	Zimbabwe	28 December 2017
155	Federated States of Micronesia	29 January 2018
156	Palau	30 January 2018
157	Central African Republic	15 February 2018
158	Panama	29 March 2018
159	Equatorial Guinea	21 May 2018
160	Cape Verde	7 June 2018
161	Saint Kitts and Nevis	7 June 2018
162	Rwanda	30 July 2018
163	San Marino	3 August 2018
164	Vanuatu	16 August 2018
165	Comoros	17 August 2018
166	São Tomé and Príncipe	24 August 2018
167	Senegal	24 August 2018
168	Suriname	2 October 2018
169	Burundi	18 October 2018
170	Eswatini	12 November 2018
171	Kiribati	5 April 2019
172	Kenya	6 August 2019
173	Barbados	8 November 2019
174	Sierra Leone	2 October 2020
175	Angola	5 October 2020
176	Trinidad and Tobago	26 February 2021
177	Mauritania	21 September 2021
178	Guyana	19 September 2022
179	Liberia	21 September 2022
180	Tonga	10 February 2023
181	Botswana	6 December 2023
182	Namibia	26 September 2024
183	Guinea-Bissau	27 September 2024
184	Lesotho	22 September 2026
185	Gabon	24 September 2026

== Bilateral relations ==
Country	Formal relations began	Notes
Afghanistan		Main article: Afghanistan–Tajikistan relations Relations with neighboring Afghanistan began in 1992 and are generally satisfactory. The areas which form the two countries were once connected, especially during the Samanid, Ghaznavid, and Timurid periods. After a friendship treaty in 1750 between Ahmad Shah Durrani of Afghanistan and Mohammad Murad Beg of Bukhara, the Amu Darya (Oxus River) became the official border of Afghanistan. The Persian language is widely used in both countries, and there are slightly more Tajiks in Afghanistan than Tajikistan. In January 2007, with funding from the United States, Afghanistan and Tajikistan opened a bridge over the Pyanj River linking the two countries. Although the goal is to improve trade, the president of Tajikistan expressed concern that it could also increase drug traffic. In March 2008, Iran, Afghanistan and Tajikistan issued a joint communique for expanding economic and cultural relations, including improving security. In January 2009, the Afghan government agreed that Tajikistan owned 3,000 hectares of disputed land along the Pyanj River. The issue arose when the river shifted course, leaving several Tajik cotton fields on the Afghan side of the river.
Armenia	21 October 1992	Main article: Armenia–Tajikistan relations: Both countries established diplomatic relations on 21 October 1992 by protocol.; Armenia is represented in Tajikistan through its embassy in Ashgabat, Turkmenistan and an honorary consulate in Dushanbe.; Tajikistan is represented in Armenia through its embassy in Moscow, Russia.; Both countries are members of the Commonwealth of Independent States, Collective Security Treaty Organization and Commonwealth of Independent States Free Trade Area.
Australia		Australia is represented in Tajikistan by its embassy in Moscow.
Azerbaijan		Although both member of CIS, the economic relations between Azerbaijan and Tajikistan stays at a marginal level. However, in July 2012, Tajik Aluminium Company (TALCO) and Azerbaijani company Azeraluminium signed a cooperation agreement during the official visit of the President of the Republic of Tajikistan Emomali Rahmon to the Republic of Azerbaijan for the construction of an oil refinery in the south of Tajikistan.: Azerbaijan has an embassy in Dushanbe.; Tajikistan has an embassy in Baku.
Bangladesh	1 March 1992	Main article: Bangladesh–Tajikistan relations
Canada	1992	Canada is accredited to Tajikistan from its embassy in Astana, Kazakhstan.; Tajikistan is accredited to Canada from its Permanent Mission to the United Nations in New York City, United States.
China		Main article: China–Tajikistan relations At the time of independence, portions of the Tajik boundary with the People's Republic of China were not defined. This boundary dispute was settled in agreements signed in 2002 that would cede 1,000 km^{2} of the Pamir mountain range to China in return for China relinquishing claims to 28,000 km^{2} of Tajik lands. In 2016 the official press agency of the People's Republic of China announced that the state will set up an anti-terrorism alliance with Pakistan, Afghanistan, and Tajikistan.
Cyprus		Both countries have a bilateral agreements on Cooperation in the Fields of Public Health and Medical Science.; Both countries are full members of the Organization for Security and Co-operation in Europe.
Estonia	2006	Tajikistan is accredited to Estonia from its embassy in Minsk, Belarus.; Both countries are full members of the Organization for Security and Co-operation in Europe.
Georgia		Georgia is represented in Tajikistan through its embassy in Tashkent, Uzbekistan.; Tajikistan is represented in Georgia through its embassy in Baku, Azerbaijan.; Both countries are full members of the Organization for Security and Co-operation in Europe.
Germany	1992	Main article: Germany–Tajikistan relations: Germany has an embassy in Dushanbe.; Tajikistan has an embassy in Berlin.
Greece	1992	See Greece–Tajikistan relations: Greece is accredited to Tajikistan from its embassy in Moscow, Russia.; Tajikistan is accredited to Greece from its embassy in Ankara, Turkey.
India		Main article: India-Tajikistan relations Diplomatic relations between India and Tajikistan were established soon after Tajikistan gained independence following the 1991 dissolution of the Soviet Union. Tajikistan occupies a strategically important position in Central Asia, bordering Afghanistan and the People's Republic of China and separated by a small strip of Afghan territory from Pakistan. India's role in fighting the Taliban and al-Qaeda and its strategic rivalry with both China and Pakistan have made its ties with Tajikistan important to its strategic and security policies. India's military presence and activities have been significant, beginning with India's extensive support to the anti-Taliban Afghan Northern Alliance (ANA). In 2002, India undertook a US$10 million project to upgrade an old Soviet military base in Ayni, Tajikistan which would support the Northern Alliance forces. The base also had a hospital to treat injured anti-Taliban forces. India provided extensive counter-insurgency military training to Tajikistan and also supplied them with new aircraft. In 2003, the two countries also held a military exercise, the first such war-game by Indian troops in Central Asia. Following the downfall of the Taliban regime in Afghanistan, the two countries signed a military agreement to increase military cooperation. Under this agreement, India has deployed 17 Mil Mi-17 helicopters and 150 Indian Army personnel at the Farkhor Air Base with a plan to deploy at least 12 IAF MiG-29s. Despite their common efforts, bilateral trade has been comparatively low, valued at US$12.09 million in 2005; India's exports to Tajikistan were valued at US$6.2 million and its imports at US$5.89 million. A Tajik proposal to transmit electric power to India is currently under review. India gave US$2 million worth emergency aid to Tajikistan during the 2008 Central Asia energy crisis.
Iran	1991	Main article: Iran–Tajikistan relations Since the collapse of the Soviet Union, Tajikistan has enjoyed a close relationship with Iran, helped along via a shared Persian identity. Iran was the first nation to establish an embassy in Dushanbe. It was also one of the first countries to extend diplomatic recognition of the newly independent Tajikistan in 1991. Iran provided diplomatic assistance and built new mosques within Tajikistan. Due to the resurgence of Iranian culture within Tajikistan, Iran helped encourage cultural exchange through conferences, media, and film festivals. Iranian television programs, magazines, and books became increasingly common in Tajikistan. However, despite the many things the nations have in common, there are also vast differences. Tajikistan's post communist government is secular while Iran's is Islamic. Furthermore, Iran is a predominantly Shia nation while Tajikistan is Sunni. The leading figures of the Islamic revival movement in Tajikistan have stated that Iran would not be a model for whatever Islamic government they advocate for Tajikistan. As of 2011 Iran is the second largest investor in Tajikistan after China.
Israel	April 1992	Both countries established diplomatic relations in April 1992.
Japan	2 February 1992	Diplomatic relations between Japan and Tajikistan were established on 2 February 1992. Japan opened an embassy at Dushanbe in January 2002, and Tajikistan opened an embassy in Tokyo in November 2007.
Kazakhstan	7 January 1993	Main article: Kazakhstan-Tajikistan relations: Kazakhstan has an embassy in Dushanbe.; Tajikistan has an embassy in Astana and a consulate-general in Almaty.
Kyrgyzstan	14 January 1993	Main article: Kyrgyzstan–Tajikistan relations: Kyrgyzstan has an embassy in Dushanbe.; Tajikistan has an embassy in Bishkek.
Latvia	11 May 1994	Tajikistan is accredited to Latvia from its embassy in Minsk, Belarus.; Both countries are full members of the Organization for Security and Co-operation in Europe.
Lithuania	13 April 1992	Tajikistan is accredited to Lithuania from its embassy in Minsk, Belarus.; Both countries are full members of the Organization for Security and Co-operation in Europe.
Malaysia	11 March 1992	Main article: Malaysia–Tajikistan relations Tajikistan has an embassy in Kuala Lumpur.
Malta	25 September 2007	Both countries established diplomatic relations on 24 September 2007.; Both countries are full members of the Organization for Security and Co-operation in Europe.
Mexico	14 January 1992	Mexico is accredited to Tajikistan from its embassy in Tehran, Iran.; Tajikistan is accredited to Mexico from its Permanent Mission to the United Nations in New York City, United States.
Mongolia	24 April 1992	Mongolia is accredited to Tajikistan from its embassy in Astana, Kazakhstan.; Tajikistan is accredited to Mongolia from its embassy in Astana, Kazakhstan.
Montenegro	23 August 2006.	Both countries established diplomatic relations on 23 August 2006.; Both countries are full members of the Organization for Security and Co-operation in Europe.
Pakistan		Main article: Pakistan–Tajikistan relations Relations between the two states were established when the republic of Tajikistan became independent following the collapse of the USSR. Trade and cooperation has steadily grown between the two nations, with several summits being held on how to improve trade between the two nations. Although relations between the two countries had been strained by the situation in Afghanistan which shares a border with both countries. In March 2008 Said Saidbaig, the Tajik Ambassador, announced that his country would be able to export cheap electricity to Pakistan and Iran. There are hundreds of thousands Tajiks living in Pakistan, although nearly all are from Afghanistan, not Tajikistan.
Poland	11 February 1992	Main article: Poland–Tajikistan relations: Poland is accredited to Tajikistan from its embassy in Tashkent, Uzbekistan.; Tajikistan is accredited to Poland from its embassy in Berlin, Germany.; Both countries are full members of the Organization for Security and Co-operation in Europe.
Russia		Main article: Russia–Tajikistan relations Embassy of Tajikistan in Moscow Until 2005, Russia had 11,000 border guards manning the Tajik frontier with Afghanistan. In September 2012, and after months of negotiating, Russia and Tajikistan have reached an agreement on what Russia will pay for its bases in Tajikistan and extended the lease to 20 or 29 years. The bases are used for 9,000 Russian troops of the 201st Motor Rifle Division. The new deal with Tajikistan makes it worthwhile for Russia to upgrade the four army camps and one air base they occupy. To get the long lease, Russia agreed to sell Tajikistan weapons and military equipment at a sharp discount and train Tajik officers in Russian schools, for free, for the duration of the deal. Tajikistan also promises to help keep the heroin out of Russia.
Serbia	9 September 1995	Both countries have established diplomatic relations on 9 September 1995, Tajikistan strongly supports Serbia in Kosovo issue.; In 2011, the total trade value amounted EUR 5,64 million.
South Korea		From 1992 to 1993 South Korea has provided Tajikistan with $50,000 worth of aid and with $500,000 worth of equipment during the Afghanistan crisis.: South Korea has an embassy in Dushanbe.; Tajikistan has an embassy in Seoul.
Turkey	29 Jan. 1992	Main article: Tajikistan–Turkey relations: Tajikistan has an embassy in Ankara.; Turkey has an embassy in Dushanbe.; Both countries are members of Asia Cooperation Dialogue, Economic Cooperation Organization, OIC and WTO.; Trade volume between the two countries was 274 million USD in 2019 (Tajik exports/imports: 131/143 million USD.
Ukraine	24 April 1993	Main article: Tajikistan–Ukraine relations
United Kingdom	15 January 1992	Main article: Tajikistan–United Kingdom relations Foreign Secretary David Cameron with Foreign Minister Sirojiddin Muhriddin in Dushanbe, April 2024. Tajikistan established diplomatic relations with the United Kingdom on 15 January 1992.: Tajikistan maintains an embassy in London.; The UK is accredited to Tajikistan embassy in Dushanbe.; Both countries share common membership of the International Criminal Court, the OSCE, the United Nations, and the World Trade Organization. Bilaterally the two countries have a Development Partnership, and a Double Taxation Agreement.
United States		Main article: Tajikistan–United States relations Embassy of Tajikistan in Washington, D.C. U.S.-Tajik relations have developed considerably since the September 11 attacks. The two countries now have a broad-based relationship, cooperating in such areas as counter-narcotics, counter-terrorism, non-proliferation, and regional growth and stability. In light of the Russian border forces' withdrawal from the Tajik-Afghan border, the U.S. Government leads an international donor effort to enhance Tajikistan's territorial integrity, prevent the transit of narcotics and material or technology related to weapons of mass destruction (WMD), and support a stable, peaceful Tajikistan in order to prevent the spread of influence and activities of radical groups and terrorists.: Tajikistan has an embassy in Washington, D.C.; United States has an embassy in Dushanbe.
Uzbekistan	22 October 1992	Main article: Tajikistan–Uzbekistan relations

== Inter-governmental organisation membership ==
Tajikistan is a member of the following international organisations:

- United Nations
- World Bank
- International Monetary Fund (IMF)
- Food and Agriculture Organization of the United Nations (FAO)
- Commonwealth of Independent States (CIS)
- Economic Cooperation Organization (ECO)
- Shanghai Cooperation Organisation (SCO)
- Eurasian Economic Community (EUASEC)
- Organisation of Islamic Cooperation (OIC)

== See also ==
- List of diplomatic missions in Tajikistan
- List of diplomatic missions of Tajikistan
