= Edmund McWilliams =

American diplomat

Edmund McWilliams (born February 18, 1947) is an American diplomat and previous United States Ambassador to Tajikistan.

McWilliams was born in Rhode Island to a father who was a mill worker and a mother who was a cafeteria aide. He majored in Southeast Asian Studies at the University of Rhode Island and joined several conservative groups on campus. After graduating he volunteered for the U.S. Army, learned Vietnamese, and was posted to Saigon as an intelligence officer in 1972, where he specialized in interrogations.

== U.S. Foreign Service Postings ==
Ed McWilliams entered the U.S. Foreign Service in 1975 and served in Vientiane, Bangkok, Thailand, Moscow, Russia, Kabul, Afghanistan, Islamabad, Managua, Nicaragua. His service in Moscow began in 1983 and ended before 1986, when he was posted to Kabul, Afghanistan.

== Pakistan & U.S. Afghanistan Policy Concerns ==
McWilliams was dispatched to Islamabad in 1988 as a semi-independent analyst of U.S. policy regarding the Afghan jihad in the wake of the Soviet withdrawal. His blistering criticism of the Pakistani Inter-Services Intelligence and their patronage of radical Islamists led to an ultimately-baseless internal investigation regarding his integrity, spearheaded by Ambassador Robert Oakley and CIA Chief of Station Milt Bearden.

== Opening U.S. Embassies in Post-Soviet Central Asia Embassies ==
In 1992, McWilliams opened the embassies in Bishkek, Kyrgyzstan and Dushanbe, Tajikistan, and served as Chargé d'Affaires at each of them. He opened the embassy in Bishkek on February 1, and in Dushanbe on March 13, and he served as Chargé d'Affaires and interim ambassador in Dushanbe until October of that year.

== Indonesia ==
From 1996 to 1999, he worked as the political counselor in Jakarta.

== Awards ==
In 1998, McWilliams received the American Foreign Service Association's Christian Herter Award for creative dissent by a senior FSO. He also received four Superior Honor Awards, two Meritorious Service Awards, and on retirement in 2001 the Secretary's Award from Secretary of State Colin Powell.

Later, he worked at the State Department in Washington on labor issues.

== Post Diplomatic Career Humanitarian, Human Rights, Refugee & Veterans Efforts ==
Since he retired from the Foreign Service in 2001, McWilliams has been volunteering with U.S. and foreign human rights NGOs, including the West Papua Advocacy Team, for which he edits the monthly West Papua Report and the East Timor and Indonesia Action Network (ETAN).

== Sources ==
- Tajikistan relations at U.S. State Dept.
- Kyrgyz relations at U.S. State Dept.
- Ed McWilliams: Making a Tragic Mistake in Indonesia
- West Papua Report

Preceded by First Chief of Mission	United Charge d'Affaires to Tajikistan; 1992 (Interim)	Succeeded by Stanley Escudero
Preceded by First Chief of Mission	United States Charge d'Affaires Ambassador to Kyrgyzstan; 1992 (Interim)	Succeeded by Edward Hurwitz
