= List of diplomatic missions of Tajikistan =

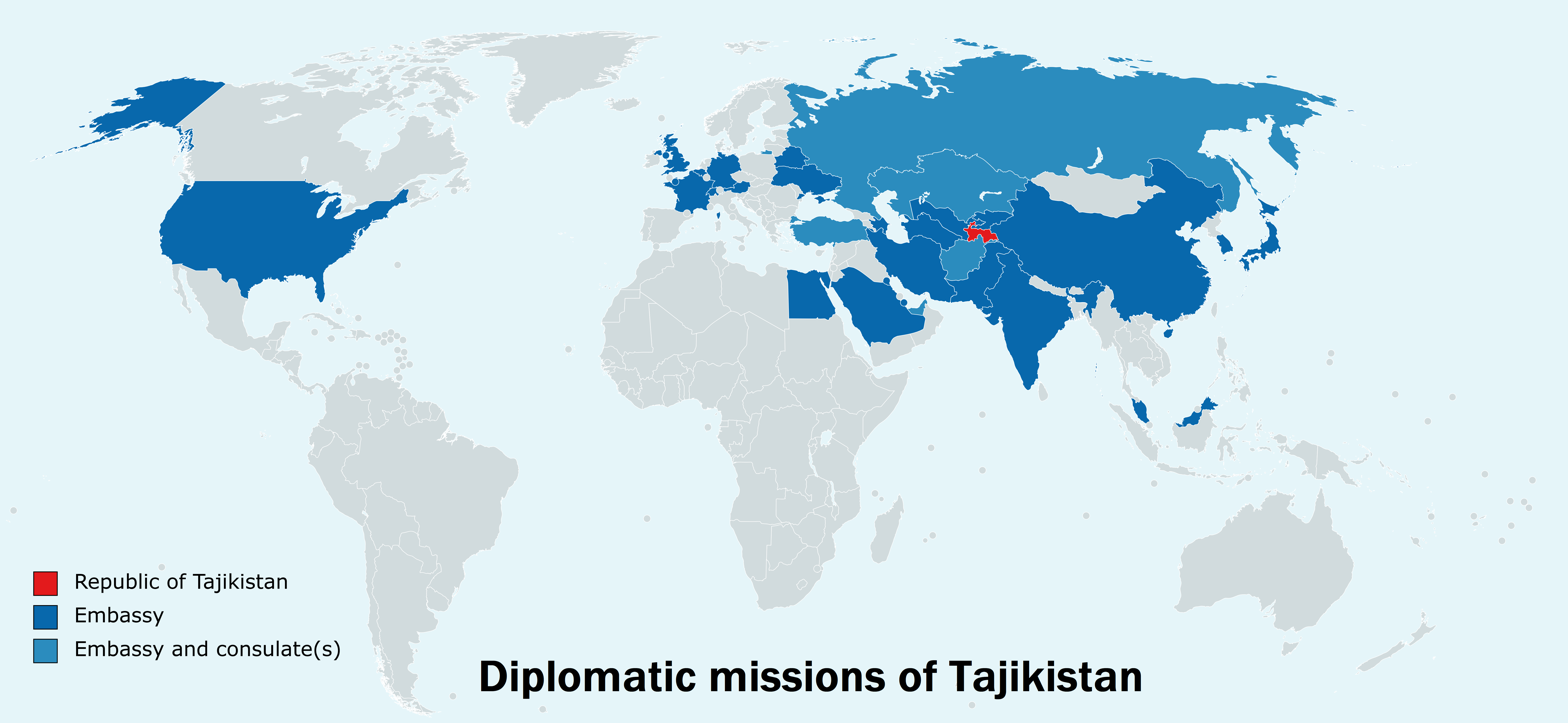
Diplomatic missions of Tajikistan

This is a list of diplomatic missions of Tajikistan, excluding honorary consulates. Tajikistan is a landlocked Central Asian country.

== Africa ==
- Egypt
  - Cairo (Embassy)

== America ==
- United States
  - Washington, D.C. (Embassy)

== Asia ==
- Afghanistan
  - Kabul (Embassy)
  - Mazar-e Sharif (Consulate)
  - Fayzabad (Consulate)
- Azerbaijan
  - Baku (Embassy)
- China
  - Beijing (Embassy)
- India
  - New Delhi (Embassy) (Note: Also accredited to Nepal.)
- Iran
  - Tehran (Embassy)
  - Mashhad (Consulate-General)
- Japan
  - Tokyo (Embassy)
- Kazakhstan
  - Astana (Embassy)
  - Almaty (Consulate-General)
- Kuwait
  - Kuwait City (Embassy) (Note: Also accredited to Oman.)
- Kyrgyzstan
  - Bishkek (Embassy)
- Malaysia
  - Ampang (Note: The embassy is located outside Kuala Lumpur’s administrative borders and it’s located in the city of Ampang Jaya in Selangor state.) (Embassy)
- Oman
  - Muscat (Embassy)
- Pakistan
  - Islamabad (Embassy)
- Qatar
  - Doha (Embassy)
- Saudi Arabia
  - Riyadh (Embassy) (Note: Also accredited to Algeria & Bahrain.)
- South Korea
  - Seoul (Embassy)
- Turkey
  - Ankara (Embassy)
  - Istanbul (Consulate-General)
- Turkmenistan
  - Ashgabat (Embassy)
- United Arab Emirates
  - Abu Dhabi (Embassy)
- Uzbekistan
  - Tashkent (Embassy)

== Europe ==
- Austria
  - Vienna (Embassy) (Note: Also accredited to Hungary, Norway, & Romania.)
- Belarus
  - Minsk (Embassy) (Note: Also accredited to Estonia, Finland, Latvia, & Lithuania.)
- Belgium
  - Brussels (Embassy) (Note: Also accredited to the Organisation for the Prohibition of Chemical Weapons.)
- France
  - Paris (Embassy)
- Germany
  - Berlin (Embassy)
- Italy
  - Rome (Embassy)
- Russia
  - Moscow (Embassy) (Note: Also accredited to Greece & Serbia.)
  - Novosibirsk (Consulate-General)
  - Saint Petersburg (Consulate-General)
  - Ufa (Consulate-General)
  - Yekaterinburg (Consulate-General)
- Ukraine
  - Kyiv (Embassy)
- United Kingdom
  - London (Embassy)

== Multilateral organisations ==
- United Nations
  - New York City (Permanent Mission) (Note: Also accredited to Guatemala.)
  - Geneva (Permanent Mission) (Note: Also accredited to Switzerland.)

== Gallery ==
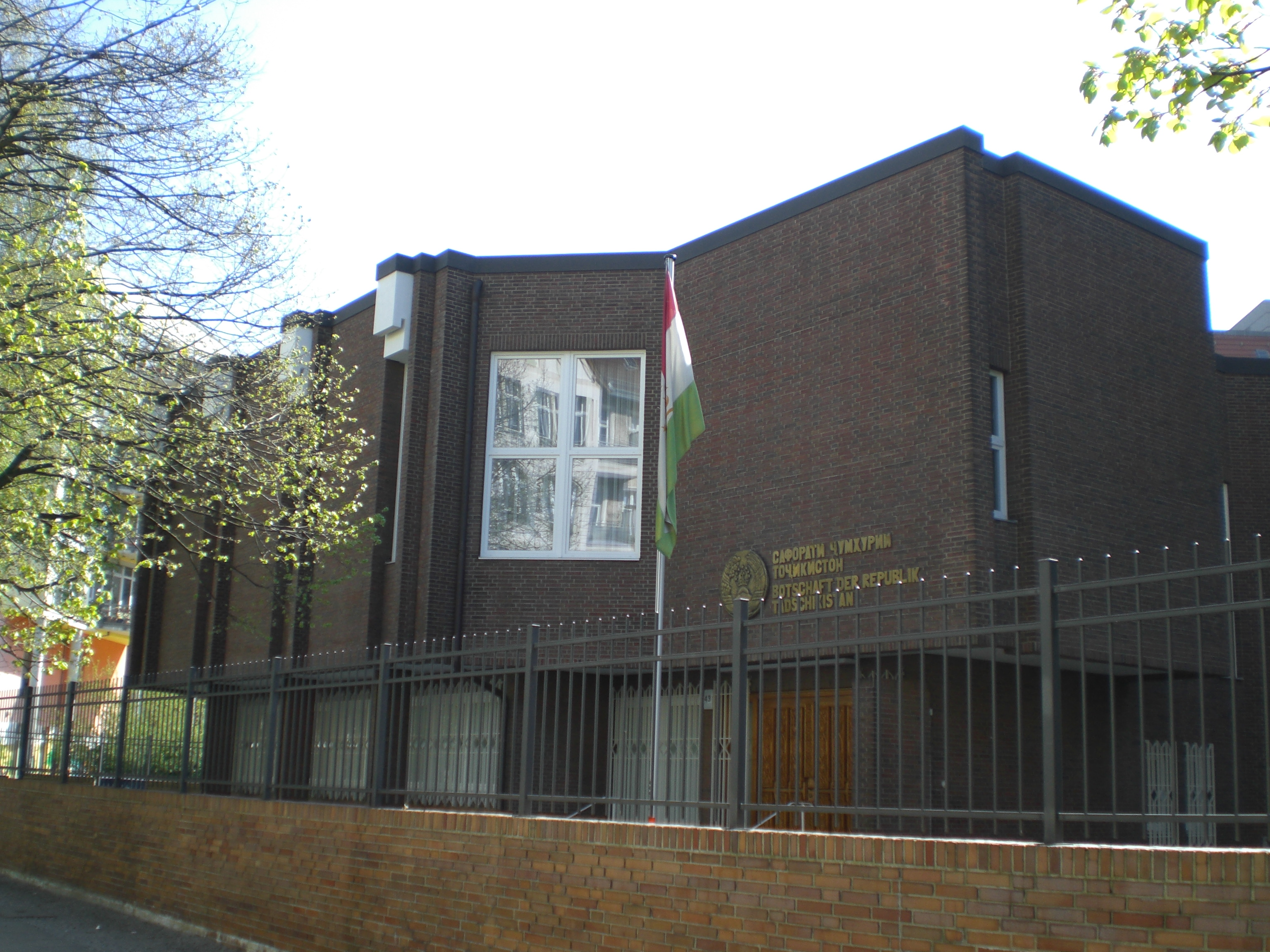
Embassy in Berlin

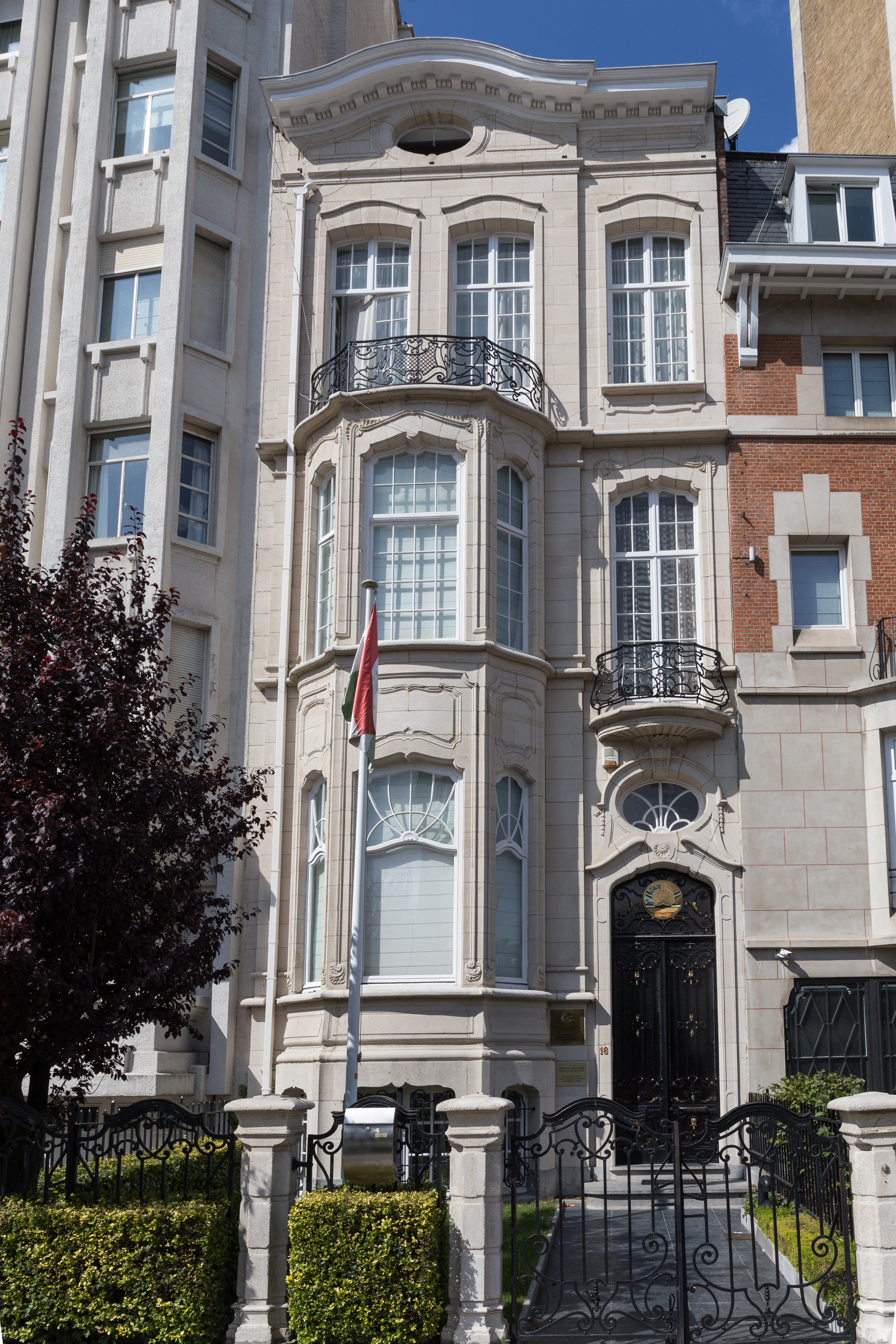
Embassy in Brussels

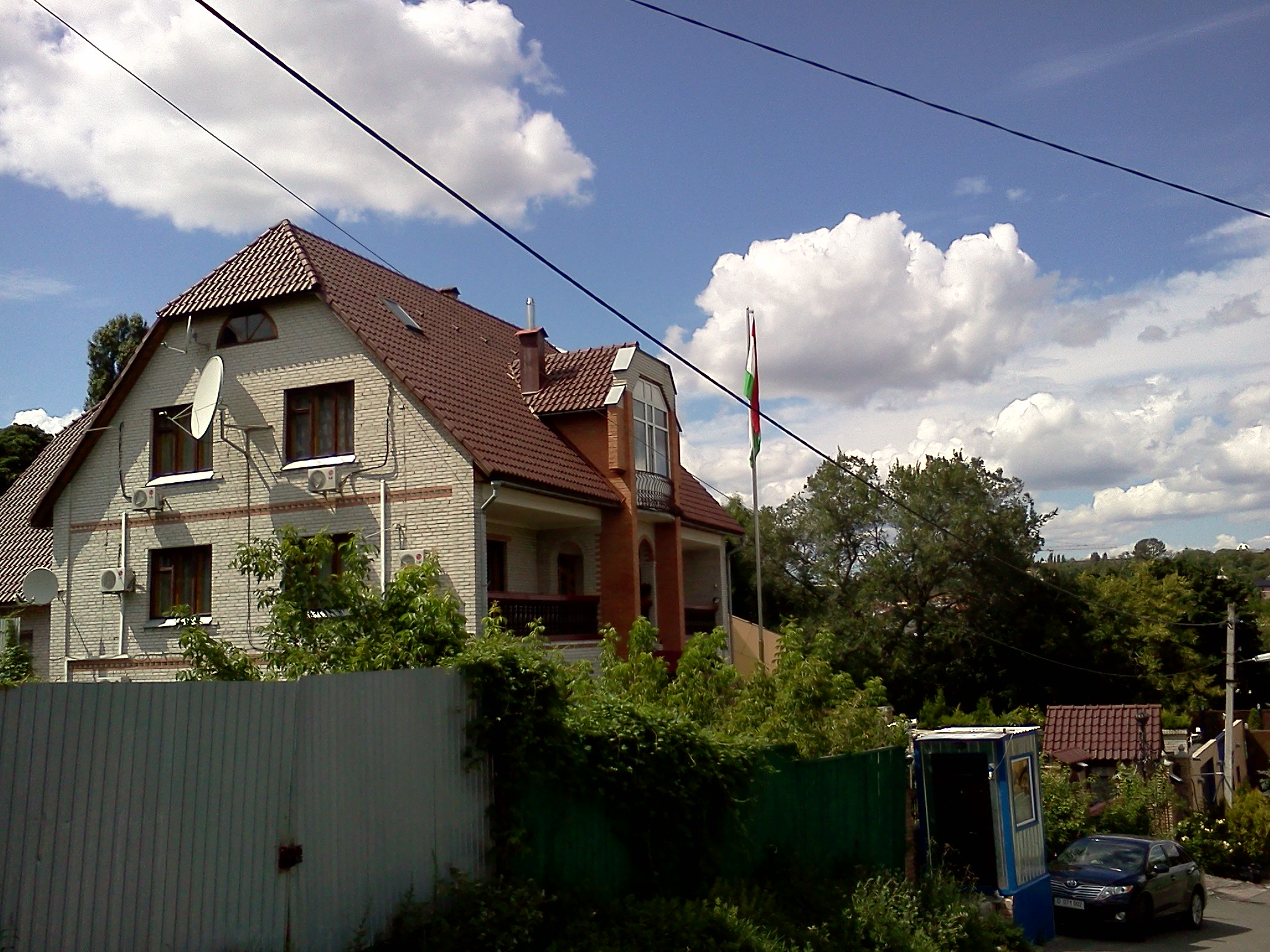
Embassy in Kyiv

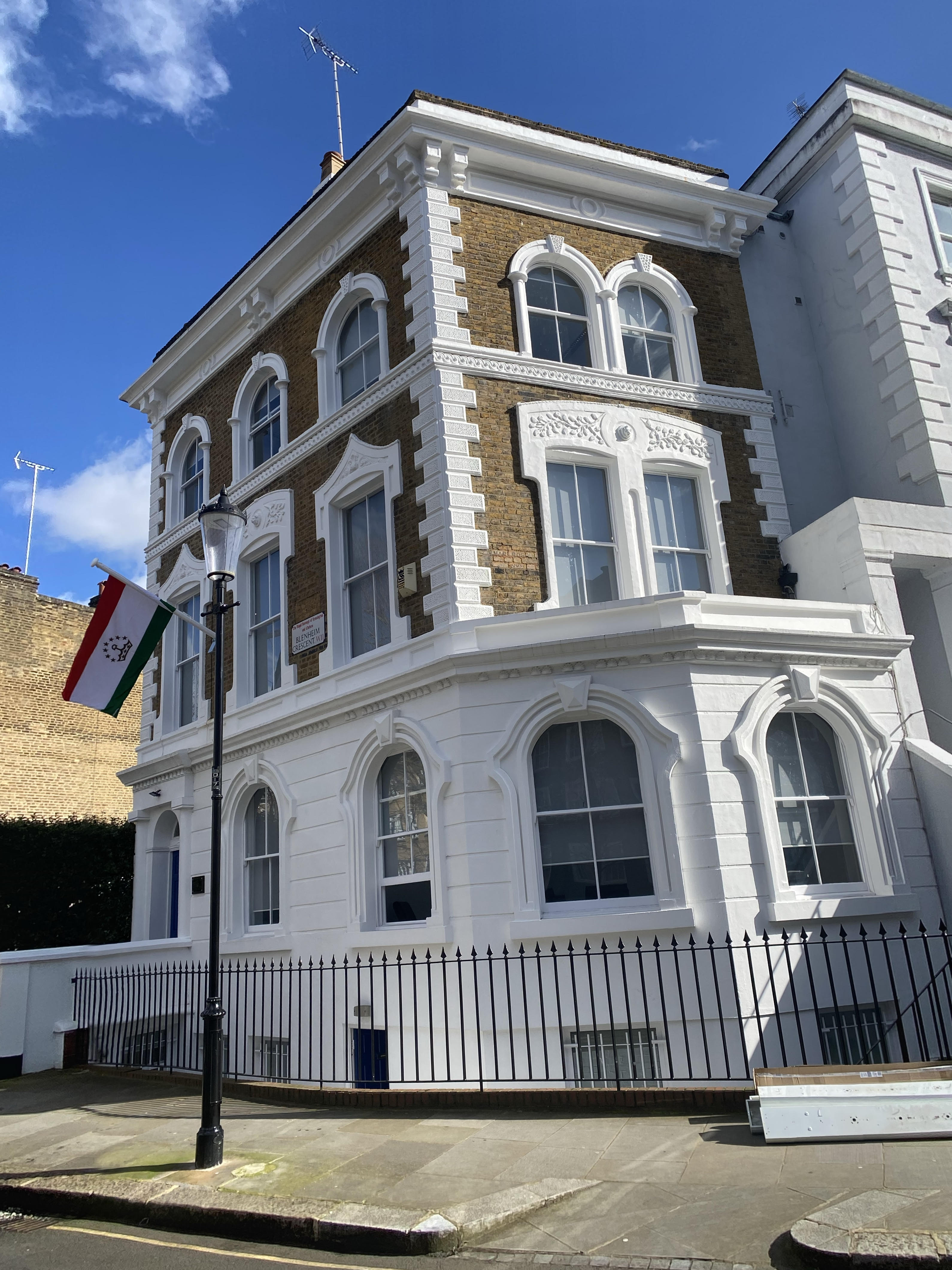
Embassy in London

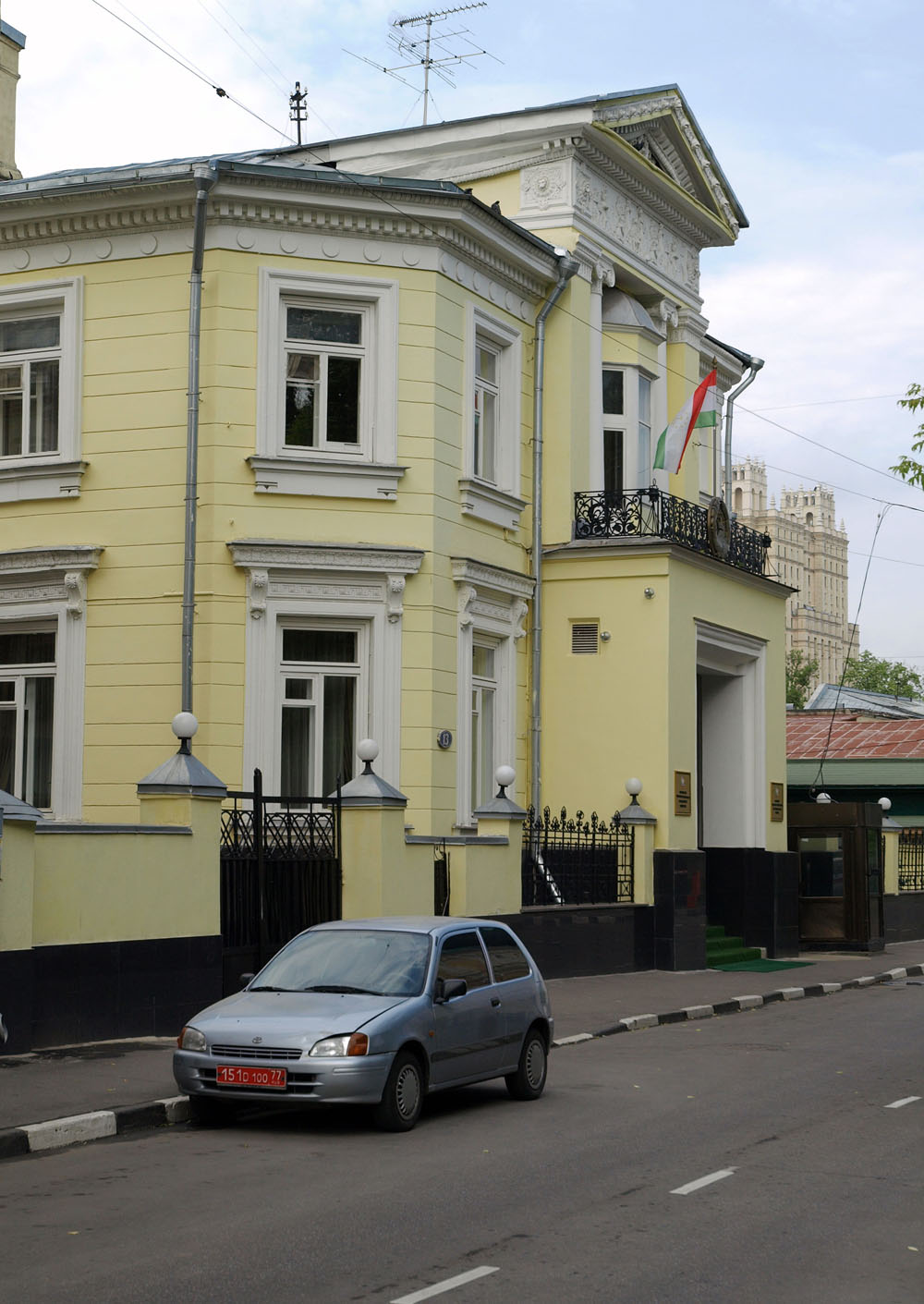
Embassy in Moscow

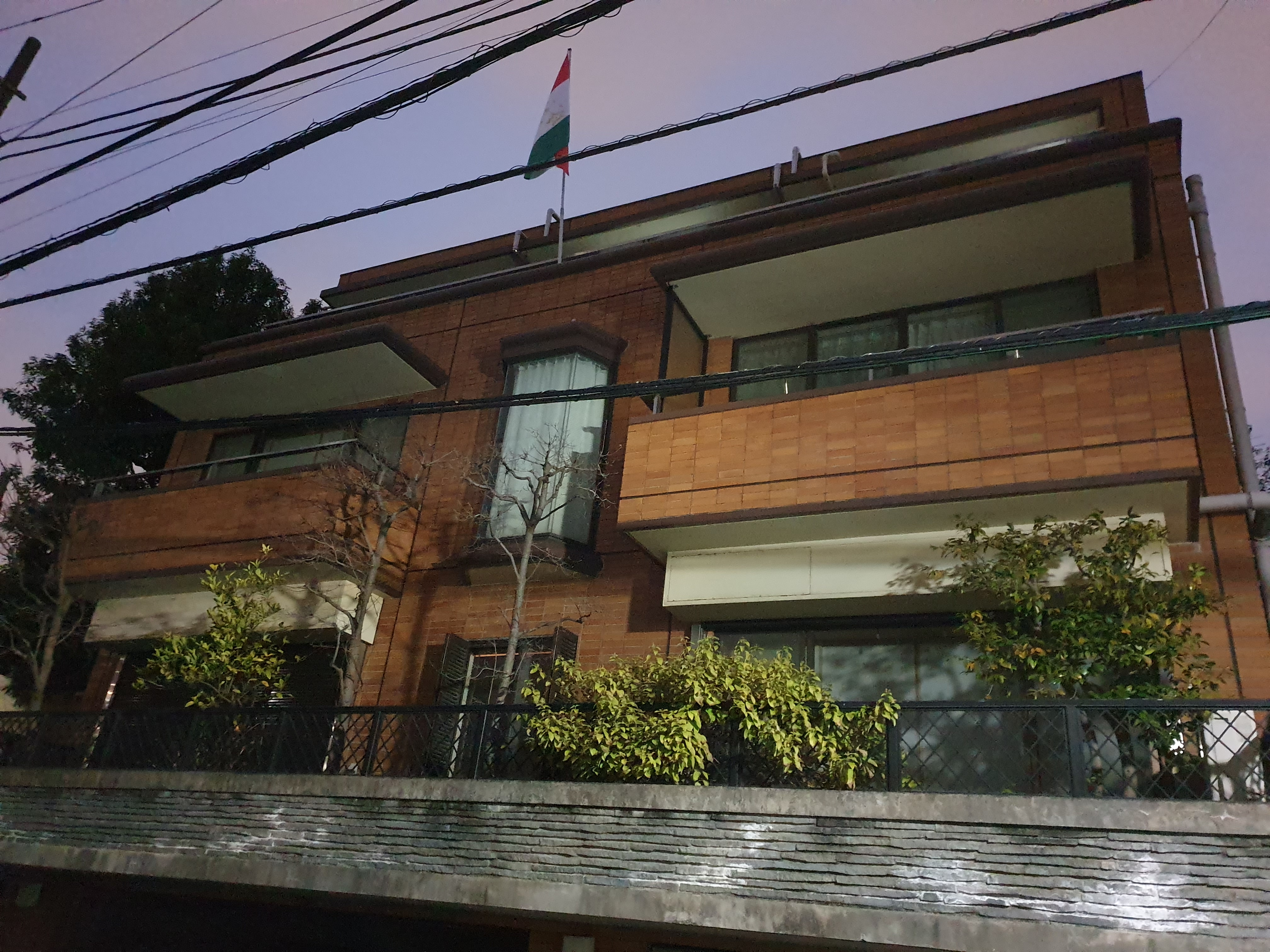
Embassy in Tokyo

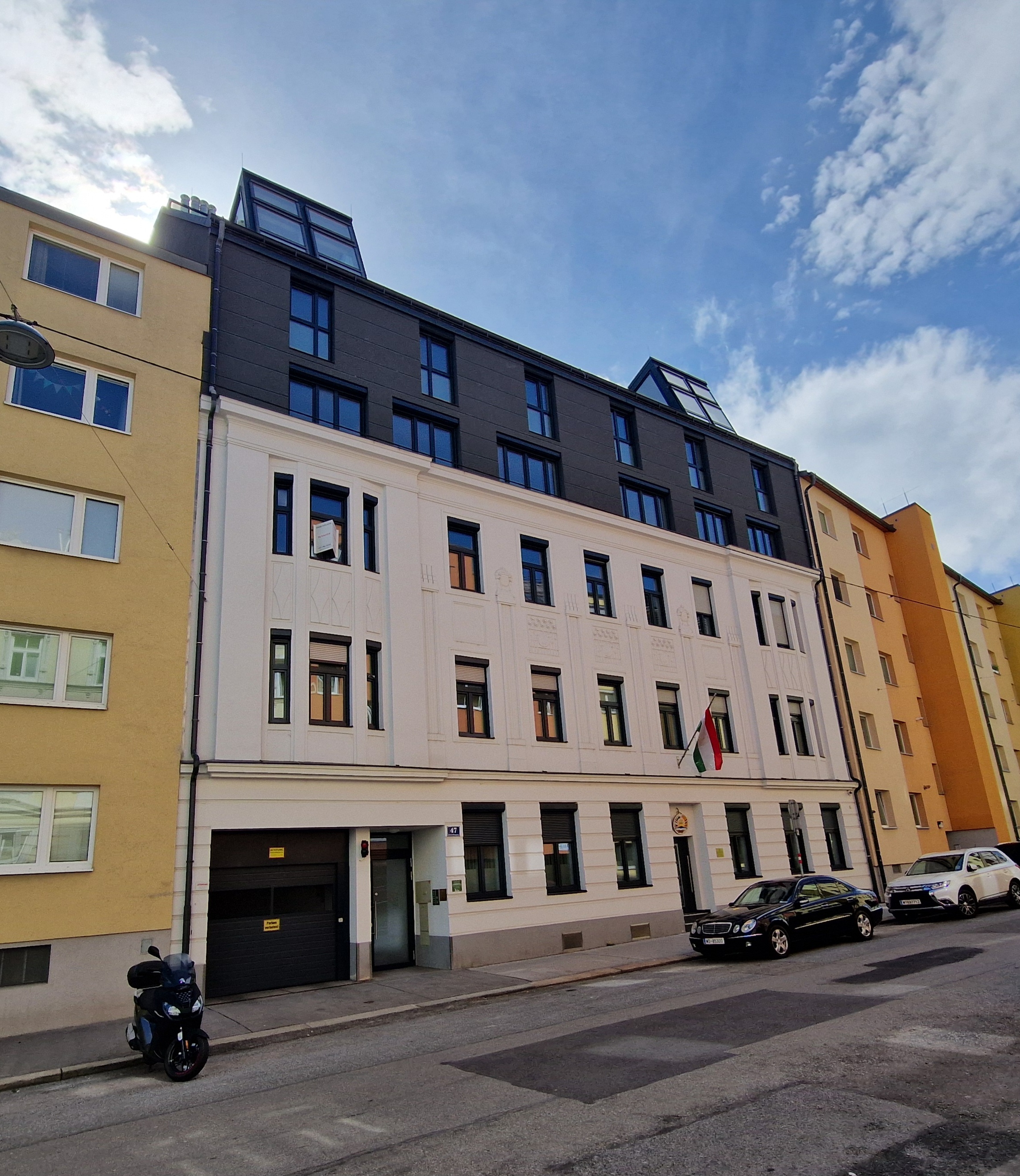
Embassy in Vienna

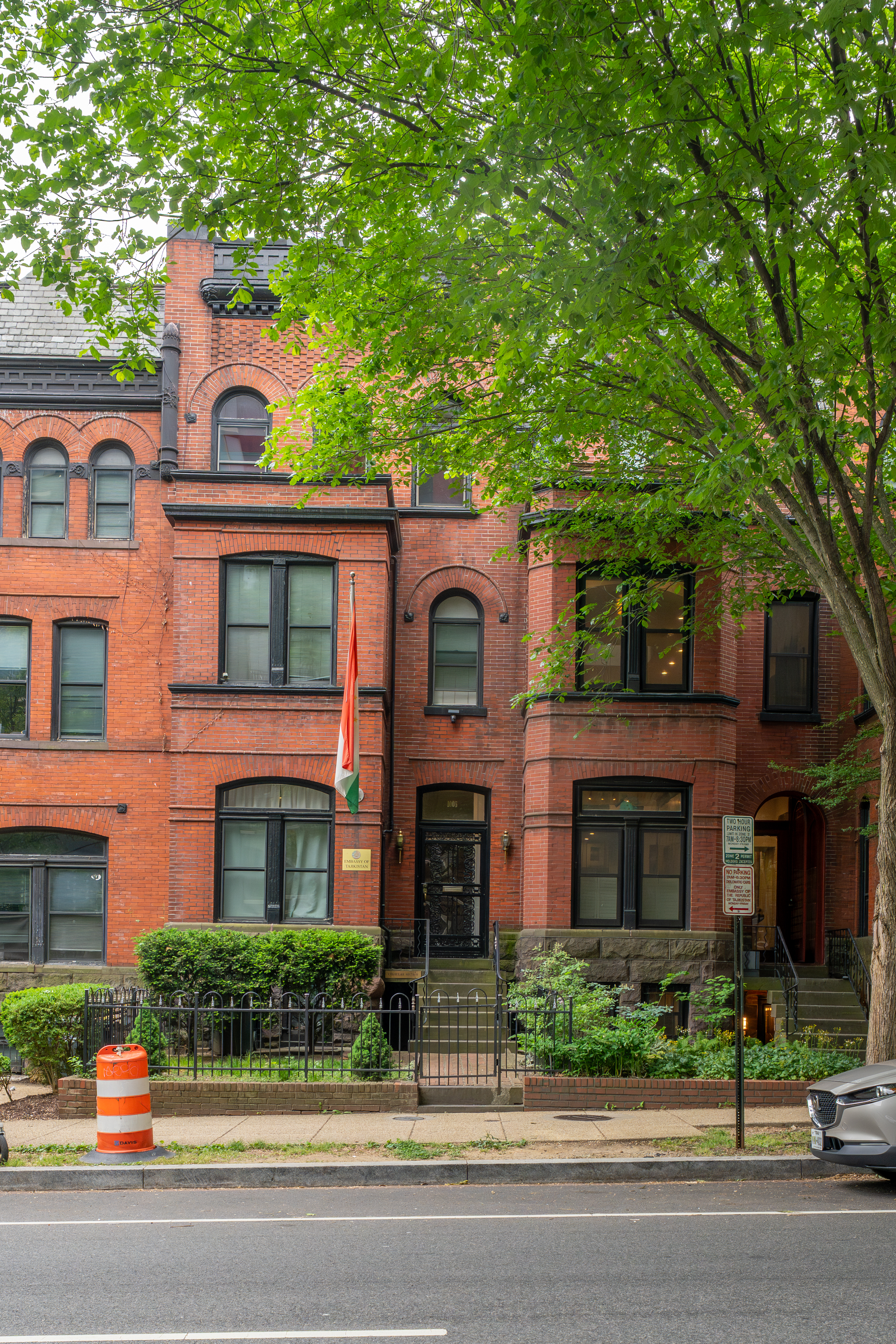
Embassy in Washington, D.C.

== See also ==
- Foreign relations of Tajikistan
- List of diplomatic missions in Tajikistan
- Visa policy of Tajikistan
