= List of ambassadors of the United States to the Conference on Disarmament =

United States diplomatic position

Permanent Representative of the United States to the Conference on Disarmament
- Seal of the United States Department of State
- Incumbent; Vacant since January 20, 2025
- Residence: Geneva, Switzerland
- Nominator: The President of the United States
- Website: U.S. Delegation to the Conference on Disarmament

The following is a list of U.S. ambassadors to the Conference on Disarmament. The formal title is United States representative to the Conference on Disarmament with the rank of Ambassador during tenure of service.

== U.S. Representatives to the Conference on Disarmament ==
Ambassador	Image	Assumed office	Left office
James F. Leonard		1972	1972
Stephen J. Ledogar		1989	1997
Eric M. Javits		2001	2003
Jackie Wolcott Sanders		2003	2009
Laura E. Kennedy		March 2010	May 2013
Robert A. Wood		August 13, 2014	October 2021
Bruce I. Turner		September 22, 2022	January 20, 2025
