= List of ambassadors of the United States to Turkmenistan =

Ambassador of the United States to Turkmenistan
- Seal of the United States Department of State

- Flag of a United States ambassador

- Incumbent; Kristin Hawkins; Chargé d'affaires since July 20, 2026
- Nominator: The president of the United States
- Inaugural holder: Joseph S. Hulings, III as Ambassador Extraordinary and Plenipotentiary
- Formation: August 11, 1992
- Website: Official website

The following is a list of ambassadors of the United States to Turkmenistan as well as permanent chargés d'affaires posted from Washington for extended periods of time. This list excludes deputy chiefs of mission designated chargés d'affaires by the incumbent chief of mission during the chief of mission's temporary absence from Turkmenistan or during brief hiatuses between chiefs of mission. Note: The United States recognized Turkmenistan on December 25, 1991, and established diplomatic relations on February 19, 1992. Embassy Ashkhabad (now Ashgabat) was established March 17, 1992, with Jeffrey White as Chargé d'affaires ad interim.

== Chiefs of mission ==
Name	Title	Appointment	Presentation of credentials	Termination of mission
Jeffrey White - Career FSO	Chargé d'affaires ad interim	March 17, 1992		August 11, 1992
Joseph S. Hulings, III - Career FSO	Ambassador Extraordinary and Plenipotentiary	August 11, 1992	September 25, 1992	September 5, 1995
Michael W. Cotter - Career FSO	Ambassador Extraordinary and Plenipotentiary	October 3, 1995	November 7, 1995	August 27, 1998
Steven Robert Mann - Career FSO	Ambassador Extraordinary and Plenipotentiary	October 1, 1998	November 10, 1998	May 28, 2001
Laura E. Kennedy - Career FSO	Ambassador Extraordinary and Plenipotentiary	September 21, 2001	October 5, 2001	July 7, 2003
Tracey Ann Jacobson - Career FSO	Ambassador Extraordinary and Plenipotentiary	July 1, 2003	August 25, 2003	July 14, 2006
Jennifer Leigh Brush - Career FSO	Chargé d'affaires ad interim	July 14, 2006		July 2007
Richard E. Hoagland - Career FSO	Chargé d'affaires ad interim	July 2007		July 2008
Richard Miles - Career FSO	Chargé d'affaires ad interim	November 2008		September 2, 2009
Sylvia Reed Curran - Career FSO	Chargé d'affaires ad interim	September 2, 2009		July 9, 2010
Eileen Malloy - Career FSO	Chargé d'affaires ad interim	July 2010		April 26, 2011
Robert E. Patterson, Jr. - Career FSO	Ambassador Extraordinary and Plenipotentiary	April 26, 2011	May 16, 2011	June 1, 2014
Laura E. Kennedy - Career FSO	Chargé d'affaires ad interim	June 4, 2014		September 12, 2014
Allan Phillip Mustard - Career FSO	Ambassador Extraordinary and Plenipotentiary	November 19, 2014	January 19, 2015	June 22, 2019
Matthew S. Klimow - Retired Military/ Career SES	Ambassador Extraordinary and Plenipotentiary	May 23, 2019	June 26, 2019	July 6, 2024
Valerie Chittenden - Career FSO	Chargé d'affaires ad interim	September 1, 2020		December 2020
Vaida Vidugiris - Career FSO	Chargé d'affaires ad interim	July 6, 2024		July 31, 2024
Elizabeth Rood - Career FSO	Ambassador Extraordinary and Plenipotentiary	May 2, 2024	July 31, 2024	July 20, 2026
Kristin Hawkins - Career FSO	Chargé d'affaires ad interim	July 20, 2026		Present

== See also ==
- Turkmenistan – United States relations
- Foreign relations of Turkmenistan
- Ambassadors of the United States
