= Heffern =

Heffern is a surname. Notable people with the surname include:

- John A. Heffern (born 1953), American diplomat
- Meghan Heffern (born 1983), Canadian actress
