= Brady, Washington =

- Census-designated place
- Location of Brady, Washington
- Coordinates: 47°00′10″N 123°31′18″W
- Country: United States
- State: Washington
- County: Grays Harbor

Area
  - Total: 6.14 sq mi (15.89 km^{2})
  - Land: 6.11 sq mi (15.83 km^{2})
  - Water: 0.023 sq mi (0.06 km^{2})
- Elevation: 328 ft (100 m)

Population (2020)
  - Total: 692
  - Density: 113/sq mi (43.7/km^{2})
- Time zone: UTC-8 (Pacific (PST))
  - Summer (DST): UTC-7 (PDT)
- ZIP Code: 98563
- Area code(s): 360, 564
- FIPS code: 53-07590
- GNIS feature ID: 2407900

Brady is a census-designated place (CDP) in Grays Harbor County, Washington, United States. The population was 692 at the 2020 census.

== History ==
Brady was named in honor of John Brady, an early settler in the Chehalis Valley. Brady had a farm roughly a mile north of the present location of the Brady Food Mart.

The Chehalis River valley south of Brady was the first part of this area to be settled, by the Smith, Twidwell and Foster families in the late 19th century. Andrew Jackson Smith settled his 640-acre (260 ha) homestead beginning in 1851. The Smith, Foster and Twidwill families are all related. At that time the Chehalis River was the only means of transportation in and out of the area, so these homesteads were staked out on the riverfront. Subsequent road construction led in the 1930s to paving through Brady of a two-lane highway, at the time called Highway 410, connecting the Pacific coast with U.S. Highway 101 at Olympia. This road is now referred to as the Monte-Elma Road. A four-lane, divided freeway connecting Interstate 5 at Olympia to Aberdeen was built through the Brady area in the mid-1960s. The section passing through the Brady area is part of U.S. Route 12.

The greater Brady area relates to the boundaries of the now-defunct Brady school district, bounded on the east by the Satsop River, on the north by the Grays Harbor County line, on the south by the Chehalis River, and on the west by the boundary with the Montesano School District at Camp Creek. Today, these boundaries roughly correspond to Grays Harbor Fire District No. 2, which is served by the Brady Volunteer Fire Department.

The school at Brady, known as Olympic View School, was consolidated with the Montesano School District in 1968. Prior to this consolidation the school was the social hub of the community. The school house was sold to a private drug abuse rehabilitation charity called the Harvester Foundation. The school playshed, which had been converted to residential housing, burned in a case of suspected arson in the mid-1970s. Two children did not escape, and their bodies were later recovered from the ashes from beneath the remains of a completely incinerated bed. The schoolhouse was later demolished.

== Geography ==
Brady is located in southeastern Grays Harbor County between Montesano to the west and Satsop to the east. U.S. Route 12, running through the southern part of Brady, leads west 15 miles (24 km) to Aberdeen and southeast 31 miles (50 km) to Grand Mound, while Olympia is 34 miles (55 km) to the east via US 12 and State Route 8.

According to the United States Census Bureau, the Brady CDP has a total area of 6.1 square miles (15.9 km^{2}), of which 0.02 square miles (0.06 km^{2}), or 0.37%, are water.

== Demographics ==
Historical population
Census	Pop.	Note	%±
2000	645		—
2010	676		4.8%
2020	692		2.4%
U.S. Decennial Census; 1990 2000 2010

Brady first appeared as a census designated place in the 2000 U.S. census.

=== Racial and ethnic composition ===
Brady CDP, Washington – Racial and ethnic composition Note: the US Census treats Hispanic/Latino as an ethnic category. This table excludes Latinos from the racial categories and assigns them to a separate category. Hispanics/Latinos may be of any race.
Race / Ethnicity (NH = Non-Hispanic)	Pop 2000	Pop 2010	Pop 2020	% 2000	% 2010	% 2020
White alone (NH)	611	612	601	94.73%	90.53%	86.85%
Black or African American alone (NH)	1	3	7	0.16%	0.44%	1.01%
Native American or Alaska Native alone (NH)	15	5	9	2.33%	0.74%	1.30%
Asian alone (NH)	0	9	9	0.00%	1.33%	1.30%
Native Hawaiian or Pacific Islander alone (NH)	1	2	3	0.16%	0.30%	0.43%
Other race alone (NH)	0	0	8	0.00%	0.00%	1.16%
Mixed race or Multiracial (NH)	9	8	24	1.40%	1.18%	3.47%
Hispanic or Latino (any race)	8	37	31	1.24%	5.47%	4.48%
Total	645	676	692	100.00%	100.00%	100.00%

=== 2000 census ===
As of the census of 2000, there were 645 people, 239 households, and 185 families residing in the CDP. The population density was 90.6 people per square mile (35.0/km^{2}). There were 257 housing units at an average density of 36.1/sq mi (13.9/km^{2}). The racial makeup of the CDP was 95.97% White, 0.16% African American, 2.33% Native American, 0.16% Pacific Islander, and 1.40% from two or more races. Hispanic or Latino of any race were 1.24% of the population.

There were 239 households, out of which 35.1% had children under the age of 18 living with them, 68.2% were married couples living together, 6.3% had a female householder with no husband present, and 22.2% were non-families. 16.7% of all households were made up of individuals, and 7.9% had someone living alone who was 65 years of age or older. The average household size was 2.70 and the average family size was 3.03.

In the CDP, the population was spread out, with 23.9% under the age of 18, 8.8% from 18 to 24, 28.1% from 25 to 44, 26.4% from 45 to 64, and 12.9% who were 65 years of age or older. The median age was 39 years. For every 100 females, there were 104.8 males. For every 100 females age 18 and over, there were 96.4 males.

The median income for a household in the CDP was $67,386, and the median income for a family was $72,750. Males had a median income of $45,764 versus $30,625 for females. The per capita income for the CDP was $20,857. About 4.9% of families and 5.9% of the population were below the poverty line, including 3.4% of those under age 18 and 35.7% of those age 65 or over.

Brady today has a grocery store, a Grange Hall, and a fire station. It has no church and has never had a post office.

== Education ==
The community is served by the Montesano School District.

== Notable residents ==
- Allan Mustard, former United States Ambassador to Turkmenistan, and Chair of the OpenStreetMap Foundation
