= Allan Mustard =

American diplomat

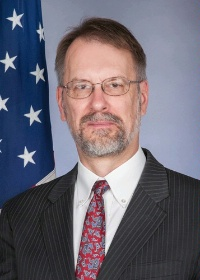

United States Ambassador to Turkmenistan
- In office January 19, 2015 – June 22, 2019
- President: Barack Obama; Donald Trump
- Preceded by: Laura E. Kennedy
- Succeeded by: Matthew Klimow

Personal details
- Education: Grays Harbor College; University of Washington; University of Illinois at Urbana-Champaign

Allan Phillip Mustard is a retired American agricultural economist and career diplomat who served as the United States Ambassador to Turkmenistan from 2015 to 2019. He was the chair of the OpenStreetMap Foundation from 2019 to 2021, and advises the Caspian Policy Center.

== Early years ==
Mustard's father, Donald, was a veterinarian; his mother was a teacher. Mustard was raised on a dairy farm in Brady, in Grays Harbor County, Washington, where he attended Montesano High School. He was subsequently educated at Grays Harbor College. In 1978 he graduated with BAs in Political Science, and in Slavic Languages and Literature, from the University of Washington, Seattle.

Mustard's early positions included work as a guide-interpreter for the U.S. International Communication Agency in Kishinev, Moscow and at Rostov-na-Donu, in the then USSR, and a year as a social worker with the Jewish Family Service in Seattle. While in the USSR he met an agricultural attaché, who encouraged him to study agriculture as a route to his desired career in the diplomatic service. He achieved an MS in agricultural economics from the University of Illinois at Urbana-Champaign in 1982.

== Career ==
Mustard's first permanent government role, from 1982 to 1986, was as an agricultural economist at the Foreign Agricultural Service of the Department of Agriculture, in Washington DC. From 1986 to 1988 he was an assistant agricultural attaché at the U.S. embassy in Moscow, USSR. During that period, the Soviets withdrew all local staff from the embassy, so Mustard's ability to touch-type in Russian saw him doubling up in a clerical support role. In 1988 he became an agricultural trade officer at the Consulate General in Istanbul, Turkey, serving there until 1990.

He was back at the Foreign Agricultural Service from 1990, first as deputy coordinator for Eastern Europe and the Soviet Secretariat, being promoted to deputy director of the Emerging Democracies Office in 1992.

From 1996 to 2000 he served as agricultural counselor at the U.S. embassy in Vienna, where he had responsibility not only for Austria, but also Bosnia-Herzegovina, Croatia, the Czech Republic, Hungary, Slovakia and Slovenia.

This was followed by another period in Washington, D.C., first as assistant deputy administrator for foreign agricultural affairs at the Foreign Agricultural Service (2000-2002) and then as a Fellow in the Senior Seminar in Foreign Relations at the Department of State (2002-2003).

From 2003 to 2008 he served as Agricultural Minister-Counselor, back at the Moscow embassy, and from 2008 to 2011 in the equivalent position at the U.S. embassy in Mexico City, Mexico. From 2011 he was in an equivalent position in New Delhi, India. At the embassy there he had responsibility for programs in India, Sri Lanka and Bangladesh, including food aid in the latter.

He was sworn in as U.S. Ambassador to Turkmenistan on November 25, 2014. In October 2015 he was joined at a groundbreaking ceremony for a new embassy building in Turkmenistan's capital, Ashgabat, by the city's mayor. Following his June 2019 retirement, he was succeeded by Matthew Klimow.

In June 2020 he was one of 612 former diplomats, senior military officers, and other government officials who signed an open letter expressing alarm at calls by President Donald Trump and others for the use of U.S. military personnel to end Black Lives Matter protests on U.S. soil.

== Support for open content projects ==
During his ambassadorship in Turkmenistan, Mustard was a proponent of OpenStreetMap, as well as an active volunteer mapper. He has described his mapping efforts as a response to the dearth of available geographic and political information in the country, following the example of the Royal Geographical Society in Central Asia in the 19th century. At the North American Cartographic Information Society's annual banquet in 2019, he gave a keynote address on his mapping in Turkmenistan. He keynoted OpenStreetMap's annual global conference, State of the Map, in 2016 and 2020 and the conference's European edition in 2023. He was elected to the board of the OpenStreetMap Foundation in December 2019 and served as chair until 2021.

He describes himself as a Wikipedian.

== Awards and honors ==
Mustard has received the United States Department of Agriculture's Distinguished Honor Award (the agency's highest); and its Superior Honor Award (twice); as well as the Grand Decoration of Merit in Gold of the Republic of Austria (the country's highest for a foreigner).

== Personal life ==
Mustard is married to Ann Anderson Mustard, a former CBS Radio News correspondent, whom he courted at the University of Illinois. They have one daughter.

He sits on the advisory board of the Caspian Policy Center.

Mustard speaks Russian, German, and "basic Spanish".

Diplomatic posts
Preceded by Laura E. Kennedy	United States Ambassador to Turkmenistan; 2015–2019	Succeeded by Matthew Klimow
