= Marie Yovanovitch =

Canadian-American diplomat (born 1958)

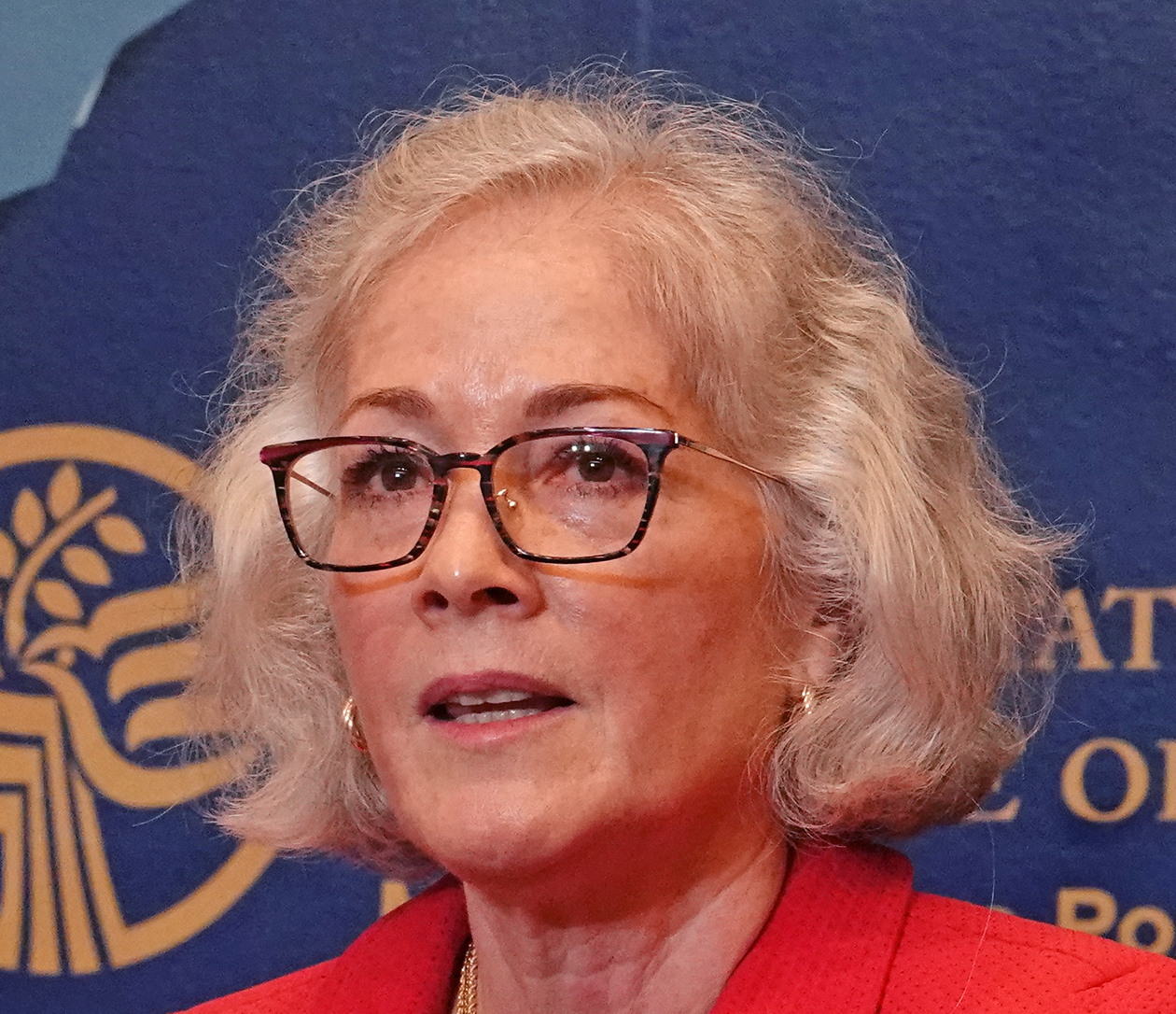
- Yovanovitch in 2023

United States Ambassador to Ukraine
- In office August 29, 2016 – May 20, 2019
- President: Barack Obama; Donald Trump
- Preceded by: Geoffrey Pyatt
- Succeeded by: Bridget Brink (2022)

6th United States Ambassador to Armenia
- In office September 22, 2008 – June 9, 2011
- President: George W. Bush; Barack Obama
- Preceded by: John Evans
- Succeeded by: John Heffern

United States Ambassador to Kyrgyzstan
- In office February 4, 2005 – February 4, 2008
- President: George W. Bush
- Preceded by: Stephen Young
- Succeeded by: Tatiana Gfoeller

Personal details
- Born: Marie Louise Yovanovitch; November 11, 1958 (age 67) Montreal, Quebec, Canada
- Education: Princeton University (BA); National Defense University (MS)

Marie Louise "Masha" Yovanovitch (born November 11, 1958) is a Canadian-American former diplomat and retired senior member of the United States Foreign Service. She served in multiple State Department posts, including Senior Advisor to the Under Secretary of State for Political Affairs (2004–2005), U.S. Ambassador to Kyrgyzstan (2005–2008), U.S. Ambassador to Armenia (2008–2011), Principal Deputy Assistant Secretary for the Bureau of European and Eurasian Affairs (2012–2013), and Ambassador to Ukraine (2016–2019). Yovanovitch is a diplomat in residence at the Institute for the Study of Diplomacy at Georgetown University. On January 31, 2020, it was reported that she had retired from the State Department.

While ambassador to Ukraine, Yovanovitch was the target of a conspiracy-driven smear campaign, amplified by President Donald Trump and his allies. In May 2019, Trump abruptly recalled Yovanovitch from her post following claims by Trump surrogates that she was undermining Trump's efforts to pressure Ukraine to investigate his political rival, former vice president and 2020 U.S. presidential candidate Joe Biden. Yovanovitch's removal preceded a July 2019 phone call by Trump in which he attempted to pressure Ukraine president Volodymyr Zelenskyy to investigate Biden. Following a whistleblower complaint about the phone call and attempts to cover it up, an impeachment inquiry against Trump was initiated by the U.S. House of Representatives. Yovanovitch testified in several House committee depositions in the inquiry.

== Early life and education ==
Marie Yovanovitch is the daughter of Mikhail Yovanovitch and Nadia (Theokritoff) Yovanovitch, who fled the Soviet Union and later the Nazis. She was born in Canada, moved to Connecticut at age three, and became a naturalized American citizen at age eighteen. She grew up speaking Russian.

Yovanovitch graduated from Kent School in Connecticut in 1976; her parents were longtime foreign language teachers at the school. Yovanovitch earned a Bachelor of Arts degree in history and Russian studies from Princeton University in 1980. Her senior thesis was titled "The Excommunication of Tolstoy. A Personal and Political Event." She studied at the Pushkin Institute in Moscow (1980) and was awarded a Master of Science degree from the National Defense University's National War College in 2001.

== Career ==
=== Early diplomatic career ===
Yovanovitch joined the United States Foreign Service in 1986. Her first foreign assignment, in Ottawa, was followed by overseas assignments including Moscow, London, and Mogadishu. From May 1998 to May 2000, she served as the deputy director of the Russia Desk in the U.S. Department of State.

From August 2001 to June 2004, as a career member of the Senior Foreign Service, she was the Deputy Chief of Mission of the U.S. Embassy in Kyiv, Ukraine. From August 2004 to May 2005, she was the senior advisor to the Under Secretary of State for Political Affairs. Yovanovitch also served as International Advisor and Deputy Commandant at the National Defense University's Dwight D. Eisenhower School for National Security and Resource Strategy and as dean of the School of Language Studies within the U.S. Department of State's Foreign Service Institute.

=== U.S. Ambassador to Kyrgyzstan and Armenia and subsequent service ===
Yovanovitch is "well known in diplomatic circles for her measured demeanor and diligence in representing both Republican and Democratic administrations." Yovanovitch was appointed U.S. Ambassador to Kyrgyzstan on November 20, 2004; she presented her credentials on February 4, 2005, and remained in this post until February 4, 2008. Her nomination as ambassador to Kyrgyzstan was confirmed by the Senate on a voice vote.

Yovanovitch was appointed U.S. Ambassador to Armenia on August 4, 2008; she presented her credentials on September 22, 2008, and remained in this post until June 9, 2011. Her nomination as ambassador to Armenia was again confirmed by the Senate on a voice vote. During confirmation hearings, Yovanovitch acknowledged that Turks had committed mass killings, rapes, and expulsions of Armenians between 1915 and 1923, calling this "one of the greatest tragedies of the 20th century," but, in line with U.S. policy, declined to use the phrase Armenian genocide, saying that the use of this politically sensitive phrase was a policy decision that could be made only by the highest-ranking U.S. officials, namely President George W. Bush and Secretary of State Condoleezza Rice.

While in Armenia, Yovanovitch oversaw a staff of almost 400 Americans and Armenians in one of the largest embassy compounds in the world. She pushed Armenian authorities to give fair treatment to Armenians arrested in post-election protests in 2008. Yovanovitch received the Secretary's Diplomacy in Human Rights Award, a department award honoring ambassadors who demonstrate "extraordinary commitment to defending human rights." She was also known for her work supporting democratic development and the advancement of women.

After returning to Washington in 2012 and 2013, Yovanovitch served as Principal Deputy Assistant Secretary for the Bureau of European and Eurasian Affairs. In that position, Yovanovitch was a key State Department headquarters contact for U.S. diplomats in Europe, working with, among others, U.S. Ambassador to Poland Lee Feinstein, regarding issues such as U.S. missile defense in Poland. Yovanovitch received the department's Senior Foreign Service Performance Award six times and the Superior Honor Award five times. She was promoted to the rank of Career Minister in 2016.

=== U.S. Ambassador to Ukraine ===
Yovanovitch was announced as the nominee for U.S. ambassador to Ukraine on May 18, 2016, to replace Geoff Pyatt; the nomination was sent to the Senate the next day, and confirmed by voice vote of the Senate on July 14, 2016. Having been sworn in on August 12, Yovanovitch arrived in Ukraine on August 22 and presented her credentials on August 29, 2016.

==== Anti-corruption work and other activities ====
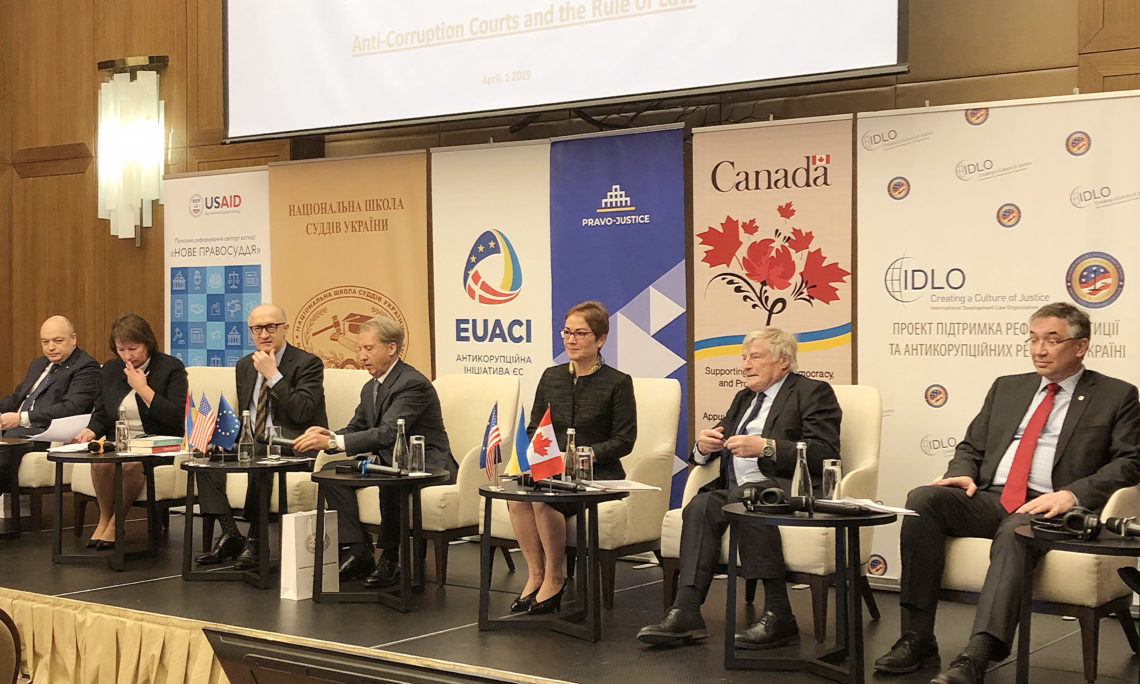
Ambassador Yovanovitch was known for her anti-corruption work including her speech at a conference held April 1, 2019.

Yovanovitch was respected within the national security community for her efforts to encourage Ukraine to tackle corruption and during her tenure sought to strengthen the Ukrainian National Anti-Corruption Bureau, which had been created to bolster efforts to fight corruption in Ukraine; these efforts earned Yovanovitch some enemies within the country. In a March 2019 speech to the Ukraine Crisis Media Center, Yovanovitch said that the Ukrainian government was not making sufficient progress to combat corruption, saying: "It is increasingly clear that Ukraine's once-in-a-generation opportunity for change has not yet resulted in the anti-corruption or rule-of-law reforms that Ukrainians expect or deserve." On April 1, 2019, Yovanovitch spoke at an anti-corruption conference where she thanked Ukrainians for their courage and commitment to end corruption.

==== Smear campaign against Yovanovitch and ousting ====
As U.S. ambassador to Ukraine, Yovanovitch was the target of a conspiracy-driven smear campaign. Allegations against her were then made by Trump's personal attorney Rudolph W. Giuliani, as well as conservative commentator John Solomon of The Hill and Ukraine's then-top prosecutor, Yuriy Lutsenko, who accused her of being part of a conspiracy involving anti-corruption probes in Ukraine and efforts by the Trump administration to investigate ties between Ukrainian officials and the Hillary Clinton 2016 presidential campaign. Lutsenko, who has been accused by Ukrainian civil society organizations of corruption, claimed that Yovanovitch, an Obama administration appointee, had interfered in Ukraine politics, had given him a "do-not-prosecute" list, and was interfering in his ability to combat corruption in Ukraine. The U.S. State Department said that Lutsenko's allegations against Yovanovitch were "an outright fabrication" and indicated that they were a "classic disinformation campaign." Lutsenko subsequently recanted his claims of a "do-not-prosecute" list. Solomon's stories were nonetheless amplified by President Trump, his son Donald Trump Jr., Giuliani, Solomon, and conservative media outlets. Ukrainians who opposed Yovanovitch were also sources for Giuliani, who "was on a months-long search for political dirt in Ukraine to help President Trump." Giuliani confirmed in a November 2019 interview that he believed he "needed Yovanovitch out of the way" because she was going to make his investigations difficult.

On April 24, 2019, after complaints from Giuliani and other Trump allies that Yovanovitch was undermining and obstructing Trump's efforts to persuade Ukraine to investigate former vice president and 2020 presidential election candidate Joe Biden, Trump ordered Yovanovitch's recall. She returned to Washington, D.C. on April 25, with her recall becoming public knowledge on May 7, and her mission as ambassador being terminated on May 20, 2019. In a July 25, 2019 phone call with Ukrainian President Volodymyr Zelenskyy (the contents of which became public on September 25, 2019), Trump pressured the Ukrainian government to investigate Biden and disparaged Yovanovitch to his foreign counterpart, calling her "bad news".

Documents to the House Intelligence Committee provided by Lev Parnas, a former associate of Giuliani, outlined text exchanges in which Lutsenko pushed for the ouster of Yovanovitch and in return offered to provide damaging information on Joe Biden. In Russian-language messages, Lutsenko told Parnas that Yovanovitch (referred to as "madam") should be ousted before he would make helpful public statements; for example, in a March 22, 2019 WhatsApp message to Parnas, Lutsenko wrote, "It's just that if you don’t make a decision about Madam—you are calling into question all my declarations. Including about B." It is thought that Lutsenko targeted Yovanovitch due to her anti-corruption efforts in Ukraine. One week before an April 1, 2019 conference on anti-corruption, Parnas exchanged encrypted WhatsApp text messages with Robert F. Hyde that indicated the ambassador was under surveillance and that her security was at risk. Hyde claimed he had merely forwarded messages received from a Belgian citizen named Anthony de Caluwe. After the House Intelligence Committee released the text messages, de Caluwe initially denied any involvement, but then reversed himself, saying that he had in fact sent the messages to Hyde but that the messages were a joke and "just a part of a ridiculous banter."

An audio tape from April 2018, recorded at a private dinner between Trump and top donors and made public by ABC News in January 2020, captures Trump demanding Yovanovitch's removal, saying: "Get rid of her! Get her out tomorrow. I don't care. Get her out tomorrow. Take her out. Okay? Do it." The recording appeared to corroborate Parnas' account that he had told Trump that night that Yovanovitch was working against Trump.

Yovanovitch's abrupt ousting shocked and outraged career State Department diplomats. Acting Assistant Secretary of State for European and Eurasian Affairs Philip Reeker, the chief diplomat for U.S. policy for Europe, testified that he had urged top State Department officials David Hale and T. Ulrich Brechbuhl to issue a statement expressing strong support for Yovanovitch, but that top State Department leadership rejected this proposal. Former senior U.S. diplomats Philip H. Gordon and Daniel Fried, who served as assistant secretaries of state for European and Eurasian Affairs and as National Security Council staffers under presidents of both parties, praised Yovanovitch and condemned Trump's "egregious mistreatment of one of the country's most distinguished ambassadors," writing that this had demoralized the U.S. diplomatic corps and undermined U.S. foreign policy. The American Foreign Service Association and American Academy of Diplomacy, representing members of the U.S. diplomatic corps, expressed alarm at Trump's disparagement of Yovanovitch in his call with Zelenskyy. Michael McKinley, a career foreign service officer who served as ambassador to four countries and had been chief adviser to Secretary of State Mike Pompeo, resigned in October 2019 in protest of Trump's attacks against Yovanovitch and "the State Department's unwillingness to protect career diplomats from politically motivated pressure." Yovanovitch's ouster became one of the issues explored in the House of Representatives impeachment inquiry against Trump; her recall was termed "a political hit job" by Democratic members of Congress. Trump subsequently said she was "no angel" and falsely claimed that Yovanovitch had refused to hang his portrait.

In a January 2020 interview, Parnas apologized to Yovanovitch for his role in the smear campaign against her.

==== Congressional testimony ====
On October 11, 2019, Yovanovitch gave closed-door deposition testimony before the House Oversight and Reform, Foreign Affairs and Intelligence committees. A transcript of Yovanovitch's full testimony was released to the public on November 5, 2019.

The State Department sought to stop Yovanovitch from testifying before Congress, in line with Trump's policy of refusing to cooperate with the impeachment inquiry. The House Intelligence Committee issued a subpoena, stating that "the illegitimate order from the Trump Administration not to cooperate has no force"—and Yovanovitch proceeded to give testimony.

In her testimony, Yovanovitch testified that Trump had pressured the State Department to remove her, and that she was "incredulous" to be removed based on "unfounded and false claims by people with clearly questionable motives." Yovanovitch stated that after her removal, Deputy Secretary of State John Sullivan had told her that she had done nothing wrong but that the State Department had been under political pressure from Trump to remove her since summer 2018. Sullivan, in his own testimony to Congress, corroborated Yovanovitch's testimony, confirmed that Yovanovitch was the target of a smear campaign, and publicly affirmed that Yovanovitch had served "admirably and capably" as ambassador.

Yovanovitch testified that her removal was the result of "significant tension between those who seek to transform the country and those who wish to continue profiting from the old ways," and that false narratives were pushed from an "unfortunate alliance between Ukrainians who continue to operate within a corrupt system, and Americans who either did not understand that corrupt system, or who may have chosen, for their own purposes, to ignore it." Yovanovitch described the State Department under Trump as "attacked and hollowed out from within," and warned that Russia and other U.S. rivals would benefit "when bad actors in countries beyond Ukraine see how easy it is to use fiction and innuendo to manipulate our system." Yovanovitch testified that when she sought advice from U.S. Ambassador to the European Union Gordon Sondland on how to respond to the smear campaign, Sondland recommended that she tweet praise for Trump.

Yovanovitch also detailed attempts by Giuliani to interfere in the State Department's consular decisions, by attempting to override a U.S. visa denial for former Ukrainian official Viktor Shokin, who had been declared ineligible for travel in the United States based on his "known corrupt activities." Yovanovitch also said that she was "shocked" and felt threatened by Trump's statement, in a phone call with Zelenskyy, that "she's going to go through some things," testifying that she was very concerned "that the President would speak about me or any ambassador in that way to a foreign counterpart."

Yovanovitch testified to Congress “My parents fled Communist and Nazi regimes. Having seen, firsthand, the war and poverty and displacement common to totalitarian regimes, they valued the freedom and democracy the U.S. offers and that the United States represents. And they raised me to cherish those values.”

External videos
- Testimony of Yovanovitch to the House Intelligence Committee, November 15, 2019, C-SPAN

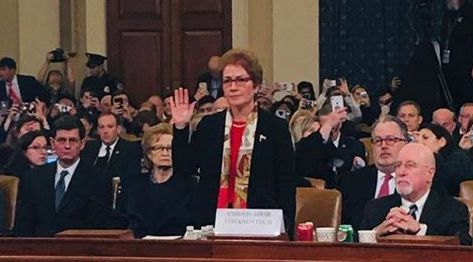
Yovanovitch being sworn in at the public impeachment inquiry hearing

On November 15, 2019, Yovanovitch testified during the public impeachment hearings. In her testimony, Yovanovitch detailed how Giuliani and his associates Lev Parnas and Igor Fruman worked with a corrupt Ukrainian prosecutor to orchestrate a smear campaign against her, oust her from her post as ambassador, and "circumvent official channels" of Ukraine policy. Yovanovitch also testified, "Perhaps it was not surprising that when our anti-corruption efforts got in the way of the desire for profit or power, Ukrainians who preferred to play by the old, corrupt rules sought to remove me. What continues to amaze me is that they found Americans willing to partner with them and, working together, they apparently succeeded in orchestrating the removal of a U.S. ambassador. How could our system fail like this? How is it that foreign corrupt interests could manipulate our government?" While Yovanovitch was testifying, Trump denigrated her on Twitter. When read what the president had written about her, Yovanovitch testified: "It's very intimidating. I can't speak to what the president is trying to do, but the effect is to be intimidating." House Intelligence Committee Chairman Adam B. Schiff and other Democrats called Trump's conduct witness intimidation; Democratic Representative Jim Himes, a member of the Intelligence Committee, stated: "The president chose to respond to a patriotic and superb public servant with lies and intimidation. ...Her boss disparaged and intimidated her not after, but during her testimony." During questioning, the committee's Republicans avoided making personal attacks against Yovanovitch or seeking to undermine her credibility, but argued that Yovanovitch's removal and the events leading to it were not relevant to whether Trump had committed impeachable offenses and emphasized that Yovanovitch's removal occurred "before the main events under scrutiny took place."

=== Subsequent posting and retirement ===
After being ousted as U.S. ambassador to Ukraine, Yovanovitch became a Senior State Department Fellow at Georgetown University's Institute for the Study of Diplomacy. On January 31, 2020, it was reported that she had retired from the Department of State. She is a senior fellow in the Russia and Eurasia Program at the Carnegie Endowment for International Peace.

== Works ==
External videos
- After Words interview with Yovanovitch on Lessons From the Edge, March 26, 2022, C-SPAN

- Yovanovitch, Maria L. Lessons From the Edge: A Memoir. March 15, 2022. Mariner Books. ISBN 978-0358457541. OCLC 1302901229.

== See also ==
- Trump–Ukraine scandal
- Foreign interference in the 2020 United States elections
- Timeline of investigations into Trump and Russia (2019)

Diplomatic posts
Preceded by Stephen Young	United States Ambassador to Kyrgyzstan; 2005–2008	Succeeded by Tatiana Gfoeller
Preceded by John Evans	United States Ambassador to Armenia; 2008–2011	Succeeded by John Heffern
Preceded by Geoffrey Pyatt	United States Ambassador to Ukraine; 2016–2019	Succeeded by Kristina Kvien; Acting
