= List of ambassadors of the United States to Armenia =

Ambassador of the United States to Armenia
- Միացյալ Նահանգների դեսպանը Հայաստանում
- Seal of the United States Department of State

- Flag of a United States ambassador

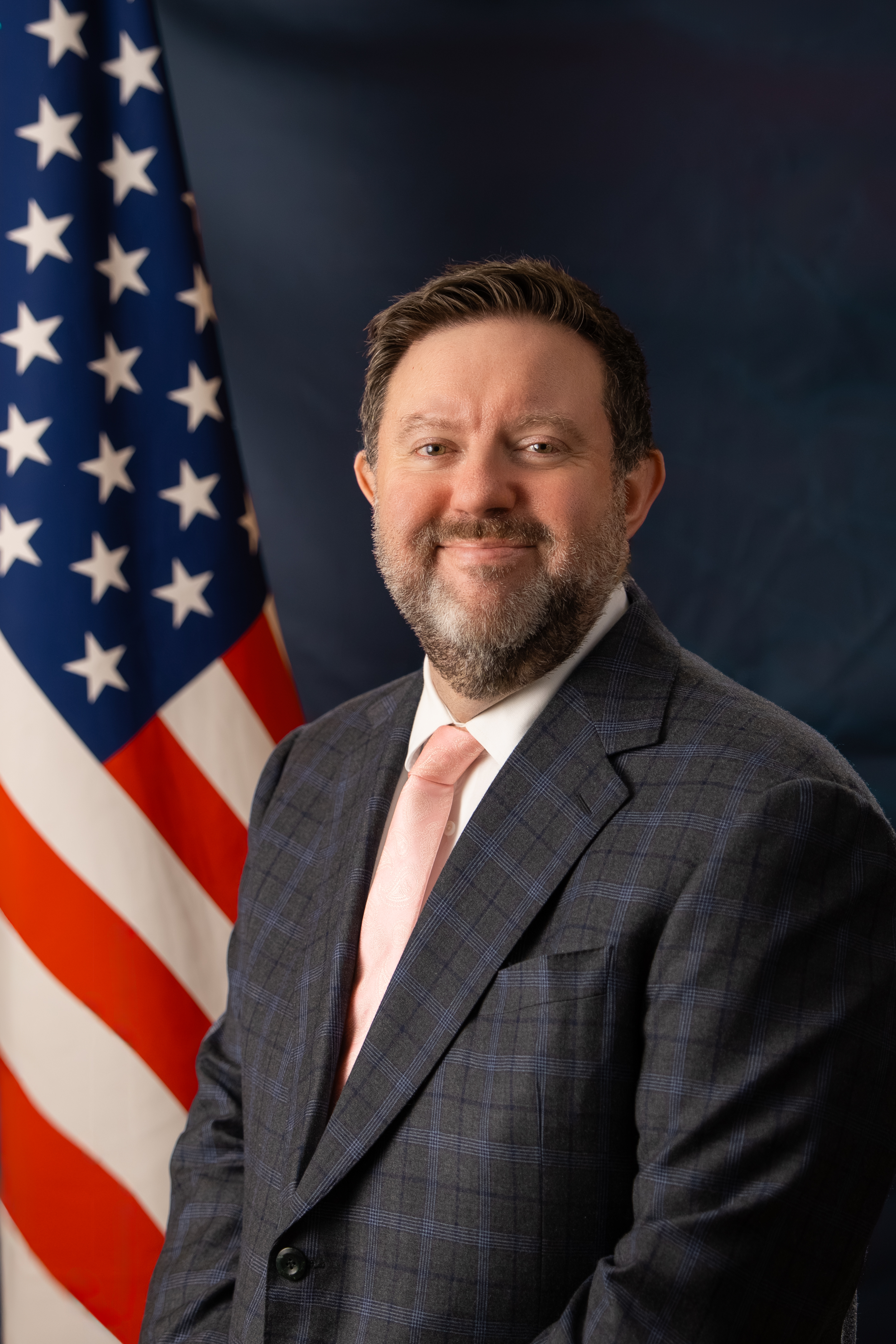
- Incumbent; David Allen; Chargé d'affaires since January 16, 2026
- Residence: Yerevan
- Nominator: The president of the United States
- Appointer: The president with Senate advice and consent
- Inaugural holder: Harry J. Gilmore as Ambassador Extraordinary and Plenipotentiary
- Formation: May 12, 1993
- Website: am.usembassy.gov

Armenia declared its independence from the Soviet Union on August 23, 1990, having previously been the Armenian Soviet Socialist Republic, one of the constituent republics of the USSR since 1936, and part of the Transcaucasian Soviet Federated Socialist Republic since 1920. In the wake of the August 1991 Coup, a referendum was held on the question of secession. Following an overwhelming vote in favor, full independence was declared on September 21, 1991. However, widespread recognition did not occur until the formal dissolution of the Soviet Union on December 25, 1991. The United States recognized Armenia on December 25, 1991.

The embassy in Yerevan was opened February 3, 1992, with Steven Mann as Chargé d'affaires ad interim.

== Ambassadors ==
#	Image	Name	Appointed	Presented credentials	Terminated mission	Notes
1		Harry J. Gilmore – Career FSO	May 12, 1993	May 31, 1993	Left post, July 11, 1995	
2		Peter Tomsen – Career FSO	June 27, 1995	September 6, 1995	September 6, 1998	
3		Michael C. Lemmon – Career FSO	June 29, 1998	September 21, 1998	October 1, 2001	
4		John Malcolm Ordway – Career FSO	November 5, 2001	November 23, 2001	July 31, 2004	
5		John Marshall Evans – Career FSO	June 30, 2004	September 4, 2004	Left post, September 10, 2006	Recalled by the Bush administration over remarks about the Armenian genocide.
-		Rudolf V. Perina		September 10, 2006	August 1, 2008	Chargé d'affaires a.i.
6		Marie Yovanovitch – Career FSO	August 4, 2008	September 22, 2008	June 9, 2011	
-		Bruce Donahue – Career FSO		June 9, 2011	October 6, 2011	Chargé d'affaires a.i.
7		John A. Heffern – Career FSO	September 29, 2011	October 17, 2011	December 22, 2014	
8		Richard M. Mills Jr. – Career FSO	January 2, 2015	February 15, 2015	October 17, 2018	
-		Rafik Mansour – Career FSO		October 17, 2018	March 1, 2019	Chargé d'affaires a.i.
9		Lynne M. Tracy – Career FSO	February 19, 2019	March 1, 2019	December 20, 2022	
-		Chip Laitinen - Career FSO		January 5, 2023	February 21, 2023	Chargé d'affaires a.i.
10		Kristina Kvien – Career FSO	December 13, 2022	February 21, 2023	January 16, 2026	
-		David Allen – Career FSO		January 16, 2026	Incumbent	Chargé d'affaires a.i.

The U.S. Ambassador to Armenia holds the title Ambassador Extraordinary and Plenipotentiary.

== See also ==
- Ambassadors from the United States
- Ambassadors of Armenia to the United States
- Armenia – United States relations
- Embassy of Armenia, Washington, D.C.
- Embassy of the United States, Yerevan
- Foreign relations of Armenia
- Foreign relations of the United States
