= Peter Tomsen =

American diplomat (born 1940)

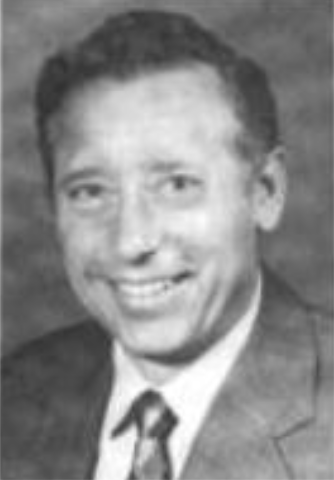
- Peter Tomsen as envoy to Afghan resistance, circa 1989

2nd United States Ambassador to Armenia
- In office September 6, 1995 – September 6, 1998
- President: Bill Clinton
- Preceded by: Harry J. Gilmore
- Succeeded by: Michael C. Lemmon

Personal details
- Born: November 19, 1940 (age 85) Cleveland, Ohio, U.S.
- Education: Wittenberg University; University of Pittsburgh
- Occupation: Diplomat

Peter Tomsen (born November 19, 1940) is an American retired diplomat and educator, serving as U.S. Special Envoy to Afghanistan from 1989 to 1992, United States Ambassador to Armenia between 1995 and 1998, and was Deputy Ambassador at the United States Embassy in Beijing from 1986 to 1989. Tomsen’s thirty-two year diplomatic career emphasized South and Central Asia, Northeast Asia and the former Soviet Union.

== Early life ==
Tomsen was born in Cleveland, Ohio on November 19, 1940. He graduated from Sycamore High School in Cincinnati, Ohio, and attended college at Wittenberg University in Springfield, Ohio, receiving a degree in political science in 1962. Tomsen was awarded a Heinz fellowship for post-graduate studies at the University of Pittsburgh. Receiving his master's degree in public and international affairs, Tomsen spent two years working in the Peace Corps in Nepal. Tomsen studied Nepali and taught civics and English in a newly founded 80-student college in a Himalayan town in western Nepal. Tomsen chose to extend his Peace Corps service for six months to be headmaster of a Tibetan refugee school.

== Diplomatic and political career ==
Tomsen entered the Foreign Service in 1967. He served as Principal Deputy Assistant Secretary of State for East Asian and Pacific Affairs, 1993 - 1995, and was United States ambassador to Armenia from 1995 to 1998. He was deputy chief of mission of the U.S. Embassy in Beijing, spanning from 1986 to 1989. He served in the political-military office of the U.S. Embassy in Bangkok, 1967 - 1968. After a year of Vietnamese language training in Washington in early 1969, he was assigned to the U.S. Civilian-Military Advisory Organization in South Vietnam, 1969 - 1970. He was a political officer of the U.S. Embassy in New Delhi, 1971 - 1975; a political officer of the U.S. Embassy in Moscow, 1977 - 1978; and a political officer of the U.S. Embassy in Beijing, 1981 - 1983. From 1984 to 1987, he served in the Department of State as office director of India, Nepal, Sri Lanka, Bhutan and the Maldives. 1989-1992: US Special Envoy to Afghanistan.

== Selected works ==
- Tomsen, Peter (July 12, 2011). The Wars of Afghanistan: Messianic Terrorism, Tribal Conflicts, and the Failures of Great Powers. New York: PublicAffairs. ISBN 978-1-58648-763-8.
- Tomsen, Peter (December 2000 – February 2001). "Geopolitics of an Afghan Settlement". Perceptions, Journal of International Affairs. 5 (4). Archived from the original on September 27, 2011.

Diplomatic posts
Preceded by Harry J. Gilmore	United States Ambassador to Armenia; 1995–1998	Succeeded by Michael Craig Lemmon
