= Matthew Klimow =

American diplomat (born 1952)

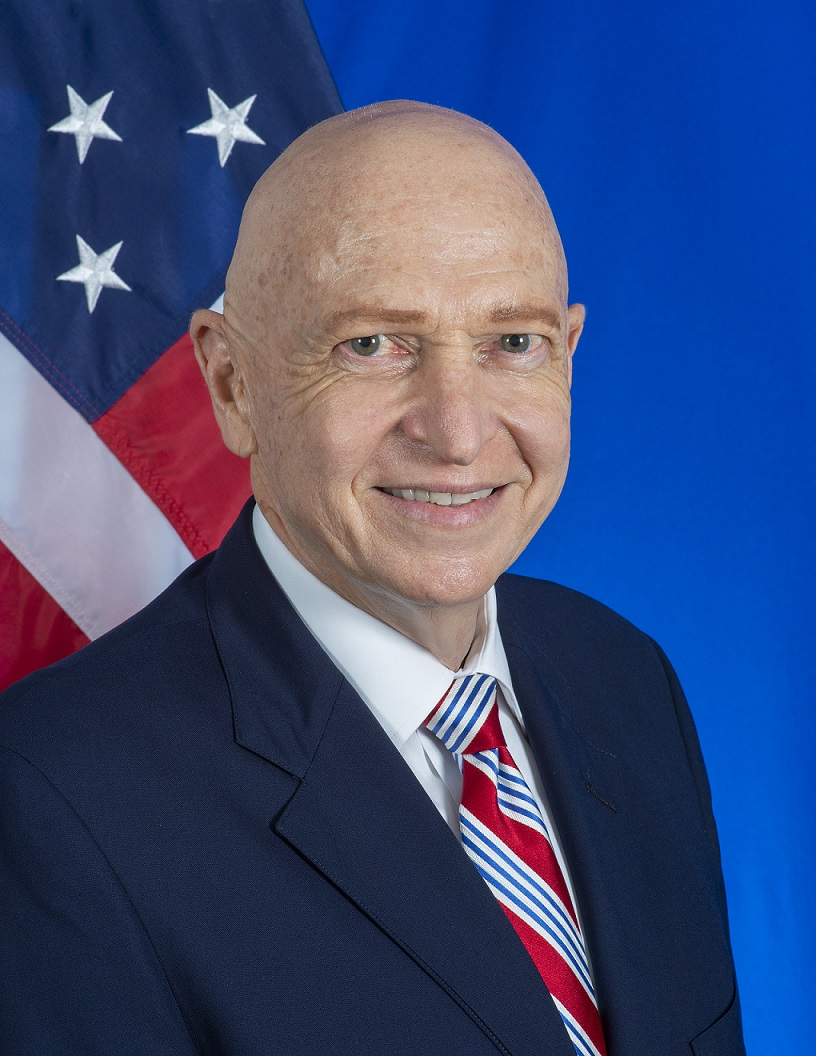

United States Ambassador to Turkmenistan
- In office June 26, 2019 – July 6, 2024
- President: Donald Trump; Joe Biden
- Preceded by: Allan Phillip Mustard
- Succeeded by: Elizabeth Rood

Inspector General of the Department of State
- Acting
- In office August 31, 2020 – December 11, 2020
- President: Donald Trump
- Preceded by: Diana Shaw (acting)
- Succeeded by: Diana Shaw (acting)

Personal details
- Born: June 10, 1952 (age 74) New York, U.S.
- Education: United States Military Academy (BS); Webster University (MA); United States Army Command and General Staff College (MMAS)

Military service
- Allegiance: United States
- Branch/service: United States Army
- Years of service: 1974–2003
- Rank: Colonel
- Battles/wars: Gulf War
- Awards: Silver Star

Matthew Stephen Klimow (born June 10, 1952) is an American diplomat who served as the United States Ambassador to Turkmenistan. On August 31, 2020, Klimow assumed office as the acting Inspector General of the Department of State and left on December 11.

== Early life and education ==
Born in the state of New York, Klimow earned his Bachelor of Science at the United States Military Academy in 1974 and a Master of Arts from Webster University in St. Louis, Missouri, in 1982. He received a Masters of Military Art and Science from the School of Advanced Military Studies at the United States Army Command and General Staff College in 1989 with a thesis entitled Surrender - a soldier's legal, ethical, and moral obligations; with Philippine case study.

== Career ==
=== Military service ===
Klimow served as a United States Army officer from 1974 to 2003, retiring with the rank of colonel. His military assignments included from 2002 to 2003, serving as a Special Advisor to the Vice President of the United States and Executive Assistant to the Chairman from 2001 to 2002 and the Vice Chairman of the Joint Chiefs of Staff from 2001 to 2000. He also served as a Combat Task Force Operations Officer during Operation Desert Storm in Saudi Arabia and Kuwait from 1990 to 1991, for which he was awarded the Silver Star Medal. Other assignments include Brigade Commander in the 18th Airborne Corps at Fort Bragg, North Carolina, from 1998 to 2000, Military Advisor to the Secretary of State and Special Assistant, Office of the Chairman of the Joint Chiefs of Staff from 1995 to 1998 and Visiting Defense Fellow at the Center for International Relations, Queen's University, Canada from 1994 to 1995.

=== Diplomacy ===
From 2012 to 2015, Klimow served as a Deputy Assistant Secretary General of the North Atlantic Treaty Organization (NATO) in Brussels, Belgium. From 2018 to 2019, he served as Senior Advisor in the Office of the Under Secretary for Management at the United States Department of State. He served as Senior Advisor in the Bureau of the Director General and Human Resources and in the Office of Overseas Employment from 2015 to 2018. He also served as the executive director of the Bureau of Administration and Bureau of Information Resource Management from 2010 to 2012 and as Director of Language Services from 2008 to 2010, and executive director of the Bureau of Consular Affairs from 2003 to 2008 at the State Department

On March 18, 2019, President Donald Trump announced his intent to nominate Klimow as the next United States Ambassador to Turkmenistan. On March 26, 2019, his nomination was sent to the United States Senate. On May 23, 2019, his nomination was confirmed by the Senate by voice vote. He was sworn in on June 13, 2019, and presented his credentials to President Gurbanguly Berdimuhamedow in Ashgabat on June 26, 2019.

On August 31, 2020, Secretary of State Mike Pompeo appointed Klimow to serve as acting inspector general of the State Department. He was expected to serve through the end of the year but resigned abruptly effective Friday, December 11. He returned to his post in Turkmenistan and completed his tour of duty there on July 6, 2024.

=== Publications ===
Author of a Best Selling Book “As the Pentagon Burned; Leadership and Human Excellence in the Face of the 9/11 attack” Palmetto Publishing, June 2026

Author of “Moral Versus Practical: the Future of U.S. Armed Humanitarian Intervention” Centre for International Relations Queen’s University Press, 1996

Author of “Surrender - A Soldier’s Legal,Ethical, and Moral Obligations With Philippine Case Study” Fort Leavenworth, Kansas 1989 Hutson Street Press

== Personal life ==
Klimow speaks French. He is married to retired Major Edie Gunnels and they have a son.

Diplomatic posts
Preceded by Allan Phillip Mustard	United States Ambassador to Turkmenistan; 2019–2024	Succeeded by Elizabeth Rood
