= Elizabeth Rood =

American diplomat

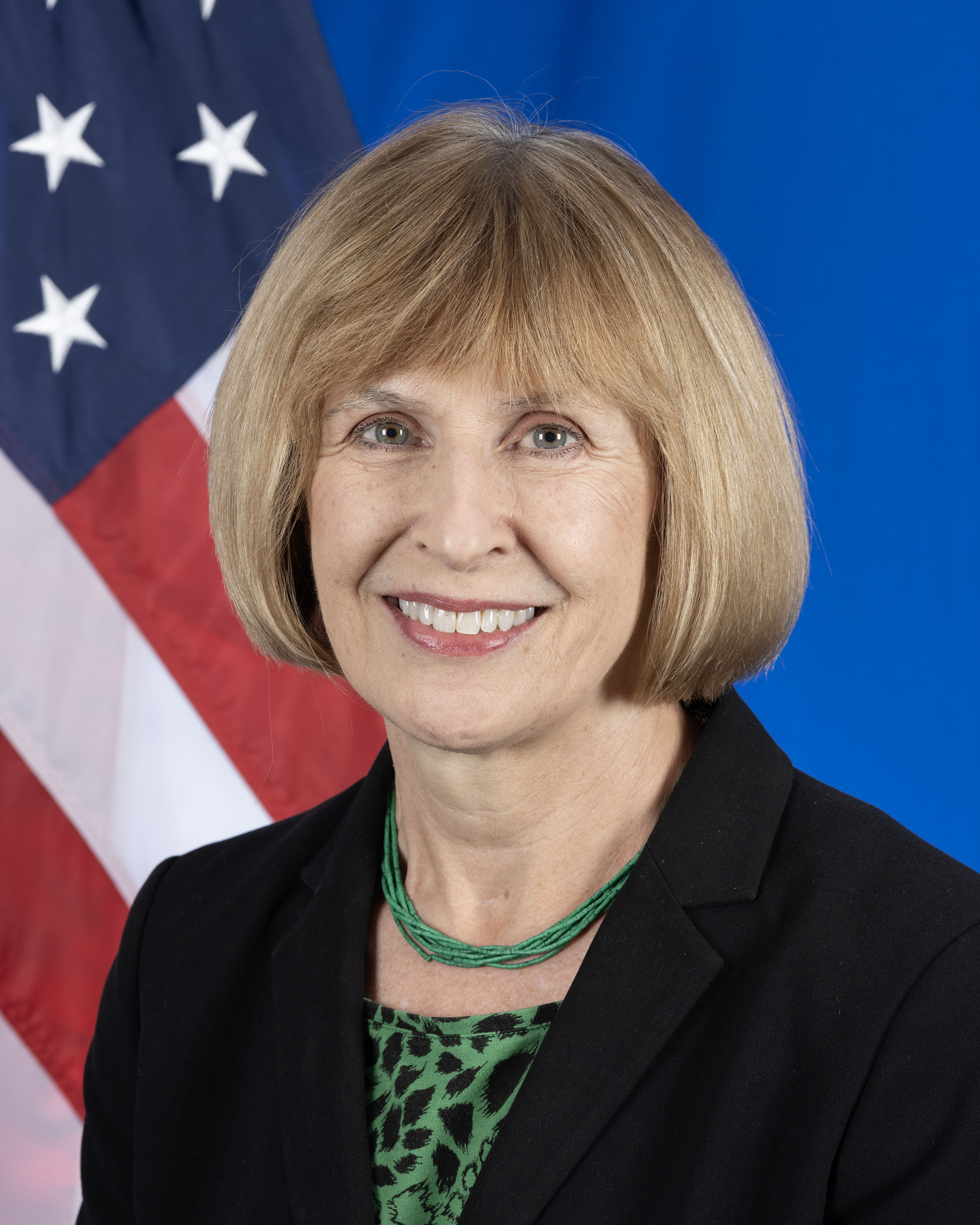
- Rood in 2024

United States Ambassador to Turkmenistan
- In office July 31, 2024 – July 20, 2026
- President: Joe Biden; Donald Trump
- Preceded by: Matthew Klimow

United States Ambassador to Russia
- Chargé d'affaires
- In office September 4, 2022 – January 30, 2023
- President: Joe Biden
- Preceded by: John J. Sullivan
- Succeeded by: Lynne M. Tracy

Personal details
- Education: Randolph-Macon Women's College (BA); University of Maryland (MA)

Elizabeth Rood is an American diplomat who had served as United States ambassador to Turkmenistan. She had served the chargé d'affaires of the U.S. mission to Russia from 2022 to 2023.

== Early life and education ==
Rood obtained a Master of Arts from the University of Maryland and a Bachelor of Arts from Randolph-Macon Woman’s College.

== Career ==
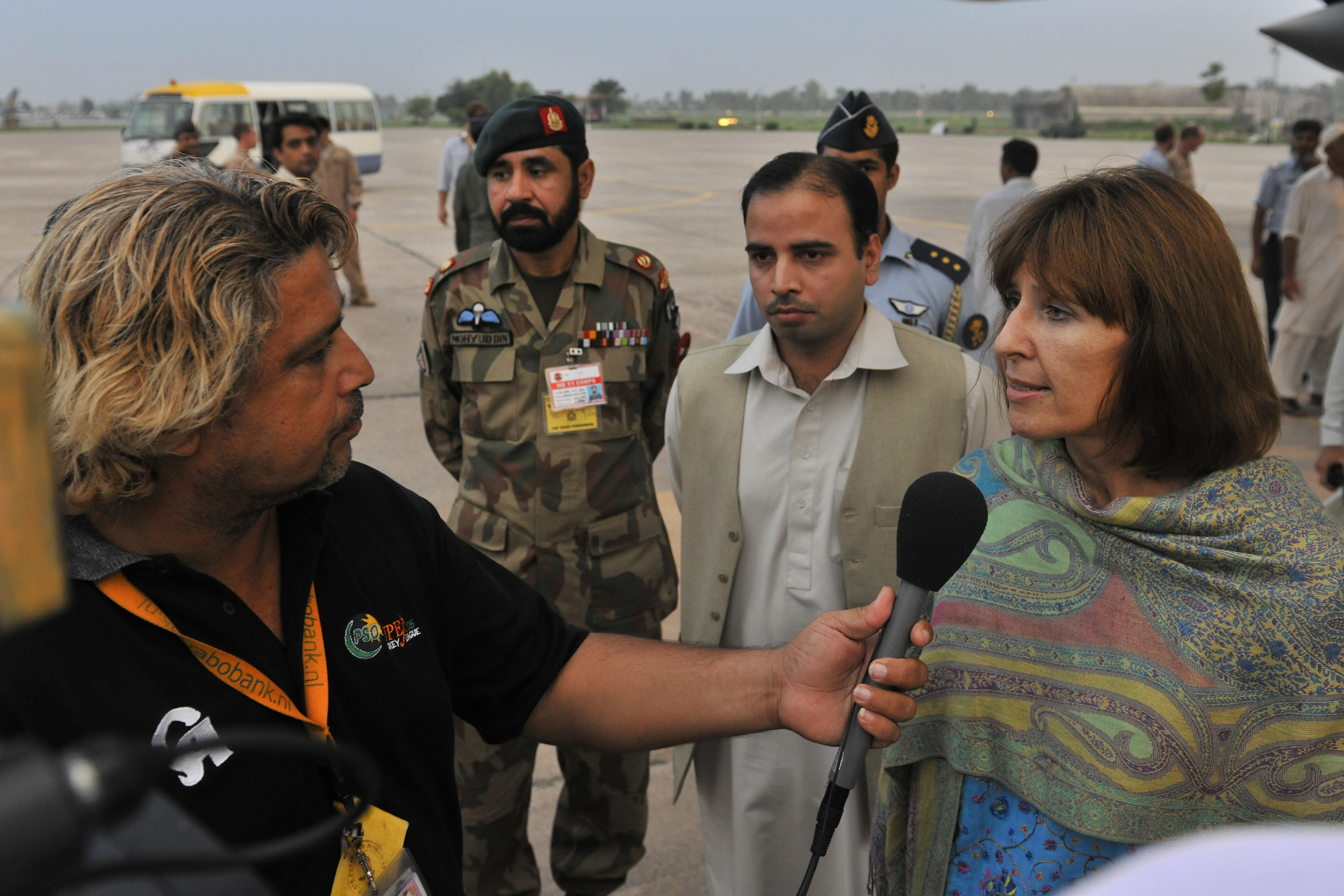
Rood is interviewed by Pakistani reporters while serving as the consul general in Peshawar, 2010

Rood joined the United States Foreign Service in 1993, after being a teacher in Frederick County, Maryland. Rood is a career member of the Senior Foreign Service with the rank of Minister-Counselor. She currently serves as the deputy chief of mission at the United States Embassy in Moscow, Russia. As of September 4, 2022, Rood assumed duties as chargée d'affaires of the U.S. mission to Russia due to the retirement of Ambassador John Sullivan, until a permanent successor is appointed. Before this assignment, she was a faculty advisor at the U.S. Army War College. She served as deputy chief of mission at the U.S. embassy in Tbilisi, Georgia; Rood also served as chargée d'affaires, ad interim there. Before this, she served as political counselor at the U.S. embassy in Kabul, Afghanistan. Rood had also directed several bureaus in the State Department, including the Office of Export Control Cooperation in the Bureau of International Security and Nonproliferation, the Office of Caucasus Affairs and Regional Conflicts in the Bureau of European and Eurasian Affairs, and the Foreign Service Institute's Stability Operations Division. Rood had also served as Principal Officer at the U.S. Consulate General in Peshawar, Pakistan. Rood has other experiences in conflicts, including serving as the State Department's representative on the U.S. Provincial Reconstruction Team in Paktika Province in Afghanistan, as well as deputy to the U.S. Special Negotiator for conflicts concerning Nagorno-Karabakh, Abkhazia, South Ossetia, and Transnistria. Other assignments include the Nonproliferation Bureau within the United States Department of State; the U.S. Mission to the International Organizations in Vienna, Austria; and the U.S. Consulate General in Düsseldorf, Germany. She also held various roles in U.S. embassies in Vienna and Moscow.

=== U.S. ambassador to Turkmenistan ===
On August 3, 2022, President Joe Biden nominated Rood to be the next ambassador to Turkmenistan. Her nomination expired at the end of the year and was returned to Biden on January 3, 2023.

Rood was renominated the same day. Hearings on her nomination were held before the Senate Foreign Relations Committee on March 15, 2023. The committee favorably reported her nomination on April 27, 2023. The Senate confirmed her nomination on May 2, 2024, by voice vote. She was sworn on July 15, 2024 and presented her credentials to President Serdar Berdimuhamedow on July 31, 2024.

== Awards and recognition ==
Rood is the recipient of numerous State Department performance awards, including three Senior Foreign Service Performance Awards.

== Personal life ==
A native of North Carolina, Rood speaks French, Russian, German, Pashto, Dari, and Georgian.
