= Michael C. Lemmon =

American diplomat (born 1946)

Michael Craig Lemmon

3rd United States Ambassador to Armenia
- In office September 21, 1998 – October 1, 2001
- Preceded by: Peter Tomsen
- Succeeded by: John M. Ordway

Personal details
- Born: Michael Craig Lemmon; 1946 (age 79–80)
- Education: Old Dominion University; University of Virginia

Military service
- Allegiance: United States
- Branch/service: United States Army

Michael Craig Lemmon (born 1946) is an American retired diplomat and soldier.

== Biography ==
Lemmon was born in 1946. He would serve for four years in the U.S. army; later he would begin working towards an undergraduate degree at Old Dominion University. He would ultimately complete his undergraduate and graduate studies at the University of Virginia before beginning to work for the foreign service in 1974.

Lemmon would serve many roles in the State Department over the course his career, including director of regional affairs in the South Asia Bureau and serving as political and military affairs officer in the U.S. Embassy in Pakistan. In 1998 he would become the United States' Ambassador Extraordinary and Plenipotentiary to Armenia, a position he held until 2001. During his time there he would participate in events such as the inauguration of the Armenian Card (ArCa) national debit system.

Lemmon would also take a role in the Foreign Service Institute, acting as Dean of the School of Language Studies. One of his notable stances as a scholar of language studies, is his advocacy on behalf of establishing foreign languages as part of a national language education policy.

In April 2012, Lemmon spoke at an event for the Carnegie Endowment for International Peace on the 2009 Turkey-Armenia Protocols. During this event, he stressed the progress the protocols represented and related his hopes for future Track II efforts.

In June 2020, Lemmon was one of 612 former officials to sign an open letter calling for police reform and criticizing calls to use the military to handle the George Floyd protests.
