= John Marshall Evans =

American diplomat

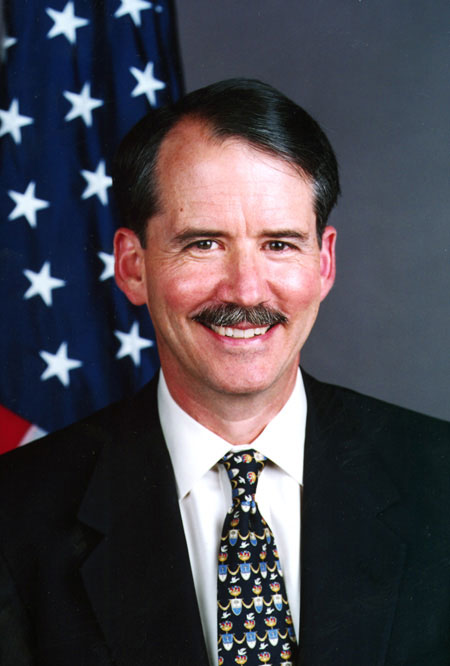

5th United States Ambassador to Armenia
- In office July 31, 2004 – September 10, 2006
- President: George W. Bush
- Preceded by: John Malcolm Ordway
- Succeeded by: Marie L. Yovanovitch

Personal details
- Born: 1950 (age 75–76) Newport News, Virginia, U.S.
- Education: Yale University; Columbia University

John Marshall Evans (born 1950) is an American former diplomat who served as United States ambassador to Armenia. He was confirmed to this position by the U.S. Senate on June 25, 2004.

Evans began his service on August 8, 2004, but, as confirmed by President George W. Bush on May 24, 2006, was terminated for undisclosed reasons.

== Life ==
Born in Newport News, Virginia in 1950, Evans attended the Williamsburg-James City County public schools and later St. Andrew's School in Middletown, Delaware, where he won the Latin Prize and the St. Andrew's Cross and served as Senior Prefect. He studied Russian history at Yale University, earning an undergraduate degree with honors in Russian Studies. He pursued doctoral studies in history at Columbia University but left after one semester to join the U.S. Foreign Service in 1971. Evans served in the US foreign service in various capacities in Iran, Czechoslovakia, the former Soviet Union, and with the OSCE and NATO, as well as in the Office of Secretary of State Cyrus Vance and on the USSR desk. He studied languages and became fluent in Persian, Russian and Czech, as well as French. He does not speak Armenian beyond a smattering of phrases.

== Dismissal from Armenian ambassadorship ==
Armenian sources have suggested that the sudden dismissal of Evans was caused by his outspoken support for the recognition of the Armenian genocide. Evans said as much in an oral history interview in which he recalled that State Department Assistant Secretary for European and Eurasian Affairs Daniel Fried had accused him of "jamming the President" on the Armenian Genocide issue and that Fried then said, "You're going to have to leave." It has been suggested that Turkey, an important U.S. ally in the Middle East, pressured the Department of State to remove Evans for his personal beliefs and statements.

After Evans's recall, the Armenian Assembly of America and the Armenian National Committee of America put pressure on the U.S. Senate to postpone the appointment of Richard E. Hoagland, the new nominee for the ambassadorship to Armenia, until the Bush administration had clarified the reason for Evans's dismissal and on the suspicion that Hoagland did not sympathize with Armenian causes. Hoagland was nominated by President Bush during the 109th Congress, during which his nomination did not come up for a vote. The Bush administration re-nominated Hoagland when the 110th session of the United States Congress convened, but the nomination was ultimately not confirmed. A new nominee, Marie L. Yovanovitch, came up for the post in 2008 and served until 2011.

Diplomatic posts
Preceded by John Malcolm Ordway	United States Ambassador to Armenia; 2004–2006	Succeeded by Marie L. Yovanovitch
