= Richard E. Hoagland =

American diplomat (born 1950)

The Honorable Richard Eugene Hoagland
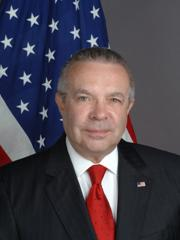

Organization for Security and Cooperation in Europe Coordinator for international peacemaking efforts on the Nagorno-Karabakh conflict
- Incumbent
- Assumed office 2020
- Preceded by: Position established

U.S. Deputy Ambassador to Pakistan
- In office January 2011–October 2013
- Preceded by: Position established
- Succeeded by: Vacant

Interim U.S. co-chair of the OSCE Minsk Group
- In office Mid 2017–Late 2017
- Preceded by: Position established*
- Succeeded by: Andrew Schofer

Principal Deputy Assistant Secretary of the Bureau of South and Central Asian Affairs
- In office 2013–2015

Senior U.S. liaison to the Russian Reconciliation Center for Syria
- In office 2016–2017

U.S. Ambassador to Tajikistan
- In office 2003–2006
- Preceded by: Franklin Huddle
- Succeeded by: Tracey Ann Jacobson

Chargé d'affaires to Turkmenistan
- In office July 2007–July 2008
- Preceded by: Jennifer Leigh Brush
- Succeeded by: Richard Miles

U.S. Ambassador to Kazakhstan
- In office 2008–January 2011
- Preceded by: John M. Ordway
- Succeeded by: John M. Ordway

U.S. Deputy Special Envoy for Afghanistan
- In office 1991–1992
- Preceded by: Position established
- Succeeded by: Vacant

Personal details
- Born: 1950 (age 75–76)
- Education: University of Grenoble; University of Virginia
- Occupation: Diplomat

Richard Eugene Hoagland (born 1950, Fort Wayne, Indiana) is a career ambassador in the United States Department of State. He was Principal Deputy Assistant Secretary in State's Bureau of South and Central Asian Affairs from 2013-2015. In the summer of 2016, based at the U.S. Embassy in Amman, Jordan, he was the senior U.S. liaison to the Russian Reconciliation Center at the Russian military base in Latakia, Syria. In 2017 he served as interim U.S. co-chair of the OSCE Minsk Group, the group appointed by the Organization for Security and Cooperation in Europe to coordinate international peace-making efforts on the conflict in Nagorno-Karabakh.

== Early life and education ==
Born in Fort Wayne, Indiana Hoagland earned a graduate degree from the University of Virginia and a certificate in French from the University of Grenoble. He was an African literature professor at the University of Virginia and taught English in Zaire before he joined the foreign service.

== Career ==
As a member of the Senior Foreign Service (Minister-Counselor), Ambassador Hoagland's earlier assignments included Director of the Office of Public Diplomacy in the South Asia Bureau of the State Department (1999-2001) where his additional portfolio was Special Adviser to the National Security Council for public diplomacy on Afghanistan. His foreign assignments have included Russia (where he was Press Spokesman for the U.S. Embassy), Uzbekistan, and Pakistan twice—the first time (1986-1989) working with the Afghan Resistance during the Soviet-Afghan War.

He also served in the State Department's Bureau of Intelligence and Research where he was the lead analyst for Afghanistan (1989-1991). Subsequently, because of his expertise on Afghanistan, he was U.S. Deputy Special Envoy for Afghanistan (1991-1992). During the course of his career, he has received multiple State Department Meritorious and Superior Honor Awards, as well as Presidential Performance Awards.

=== Ambassadorships ===
Ambassador Hoagland was Director of the Office of Caucasus and Central Asian Affairs in the Bureau of European and Eurasian Affairs, Department of State from June 2001-July 2003. In that position, he wrote and negotiated four of the key bilateral documents defining the Central Asian states' enhanced relationship with the United States. After September 11, 2001, he initiated regular U.S.- Russia consultations in response to the mandate by Presidents Bush and Putin that the two governments work together to increase their collaboration and transparency in Central Asia and the Caucasus. In July 2002, this consultative group became part of the ongoing U.S.-Russia Counterterrorism Working Group.

==== Tajikistan ====
He later served as the Ambassador to Tajikistan 2003–06, and as the Chargé d'affaires to Turkmenistan July 2007-July 2008. He then became the U.S. Ambassador to Kazakhstan from 2008 to January 2011.

==== Pakistan ====
From January 2011 to October 2013, he was the United States Deputy Ambassador to Pakistan, a title rarely used by State, but which has been used in other countries where the U.S. has a difficult diplomatic mission (notably in Embassy of the United States, Kabul and in the structure of the U.S. mission to South Vietnam in the 1960s). The title Deputy Ambassador carries more political responsibility and weight than the more common title of Deputy Chief of Mission.

==== Nomination for Ambassadorship to Armenia ====
Ambassador Hoagland was nominated for the United States ambassadorship to Armenia on May 23, 2006. His predecessor John Marshall Evans was recalled from his position in May 2006 after publicly speaking about the Armenian genocide. On August 1, 2006, the Armenian Assembly of America announced that Senate Foreign Relations Committee Ranking Member Joe Biden together with Senator John Kerry requested a hold on Hoagland's nomination, claiming that he hoped the Administration "will find a way to acknowledge the Armenian Genocide." On September 12, 2006, New Jersey Senator Bob Menendez issued a hold on the confirmation vote for Hoagland, stating that "if the Bush Administration continues to refuse to acknowledge the atrocities of the Armenian Genocide, then there is certainly cause for great alarm, which is why I am placing a hold on this nominee."

With the new congress in January 2007, the stalled nomination had expired, and on January 9, 2007, Richard Hoagland was renominated as ambassador to Armenia. The nomination was withdrawn by the White House on August 3, 2007.

Diplomatic posts
Preceded by Franklin Huddle	United States Ambassador to Tajikistan; 2003-2006	Succeeded by Tracey Ann Jacobson
Preceded by John Ordway	United States Ambassador to Kazakhstan; 2008-2011	Succeeded by Kenneth Fairfax
