= Lynne M. Tracy =

American diplomat

Lynne Tracy
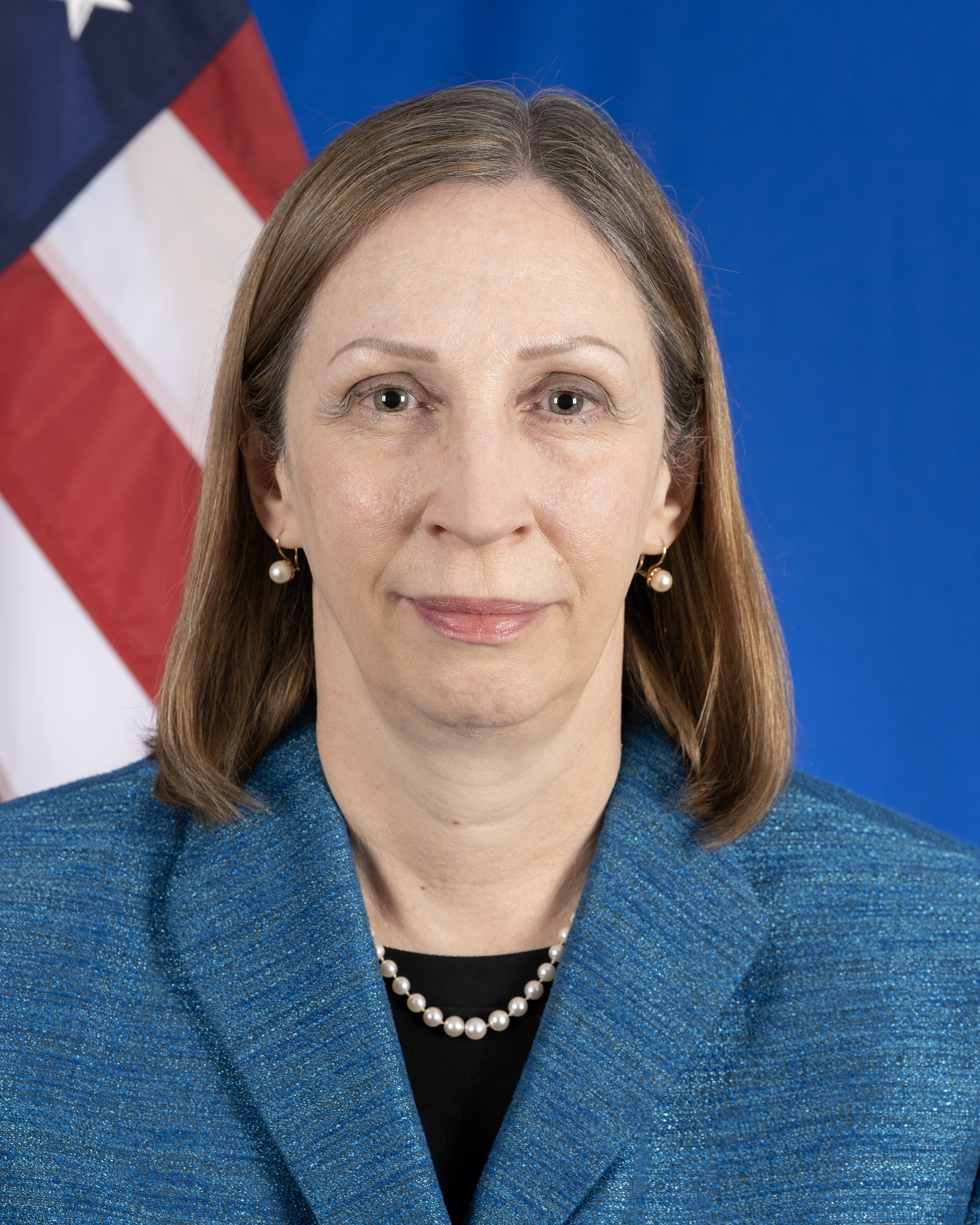

United States Ambassador to Russia
- In office January 30, 2023 – June 27, 2025
- President: Joe Biden; Donald Trump
- Preceded by: John J. Sullivan
- Succeeded by: J. Douglas Dykhouse (chargé d'affaires ad interim)

9th United States Ambassador to Armenia
- In office March 1, 2019 – December 20, 2022
- President: Donald Trump; Joe Biden
- Preceded by: Richard M. Mills Jr.
- Succeeded by: Kristina Kvien

Personal details
- Born: Barberton, Ohio, U.S.
- Education: University of Georgia (BA); University of Akron (JD)
- Lynne M. Tracy's voice Tracy's opening statement at her confirmation hearing to be United States ambassador to Russia; Recorded November 30, 2022

Lynne Marie Tracy is an American diplomat who served as the United States ambassador to Russia from 2023 to 2025. She had previously served as the United States ambassador to Armenia from 2019 to 2022.

== Early life and education ==
Tracy was born in Barberton, Ohio, one of three daughters of Albert and Carol Pontius Tracy. She earned a B.A. in Soviet Studies from the University of Georgia in 1986, and a J.D. in 1994 from the University of Akron School of Law.

== Career ==
Embarking on a career in Foreign Service, Tracy served in a variety of international assignments, focused especially in Central and South Asia, including deputy chief of mission in the embassy in Ashgabat, Turkmenistan, political/Consular officer in Peshawar, Pakistan from 1995 to 1997, and principal officer in Astana, Kazakhstan. Tracy served as political officer in Kabul from 2002 to 2003, consular officer in Bishkek, Kyrgyzstan from 1997 to 2000; and as principal officer in Peshawar, Pakistan, from 2007 to 2009. In domestic assignments she served as desk officer for Kazakhstan from 2003 to 2004 and for Georgia in the Bureau of European and Eurasian Affairs from 2001 to 2002, and staff assistant for the special envoy for the Newly-Independent States at the Department of State from 2000 to 2001.

On August 26, 2008, while stationed as principal officer in Peshawar, she was attacked by gunmen who sprayed her automobile with bullets, shooting out the front tires. Tracy, her bodyguard and driver all escaped. The Secretary's Award for Heroism recognized her "quick thinking", her return to work on the same day, and her continuation in her role despite the risks.

Tracy was director for Central Asia at the National Security Council from 2011 to 2012. From 2012 to 2014, she was deputy assistant secretary for Central Asia in the Bureau of South and Central Asian Affairs. From 2014 to 2017, Tracy was the deputy chief of mission at the embassy in Moscow, Russia. In 2017, Tracy received a Distinguished Honor Award for her contribution as deputy chief of mission in Moscow.

=== United States ambassador to Armenia ===
On September 28, 2018, President Donald Trump nominated Tracy as United States ambassador to Armenia, and she was confirmed by the Senate on January 2, 2019. Tracy's approval was preceded by intense questioning by Senators Bob Menendez and Ed Markey about U.S. policy with regard to Turkey's denial of the Armenian genocide. She was sworn in as ambassador in February 2019. Tracy presented her credentials on March 1. She left office on December 20, 2022.

On December 7, 2022, the Foreign Minister of Armenia Ararat Mirzoyan awarded Lynne Tracy with the Medal of Honor of the Foreign Ministry of Armenia.

=== United States ambassador to Russia ===
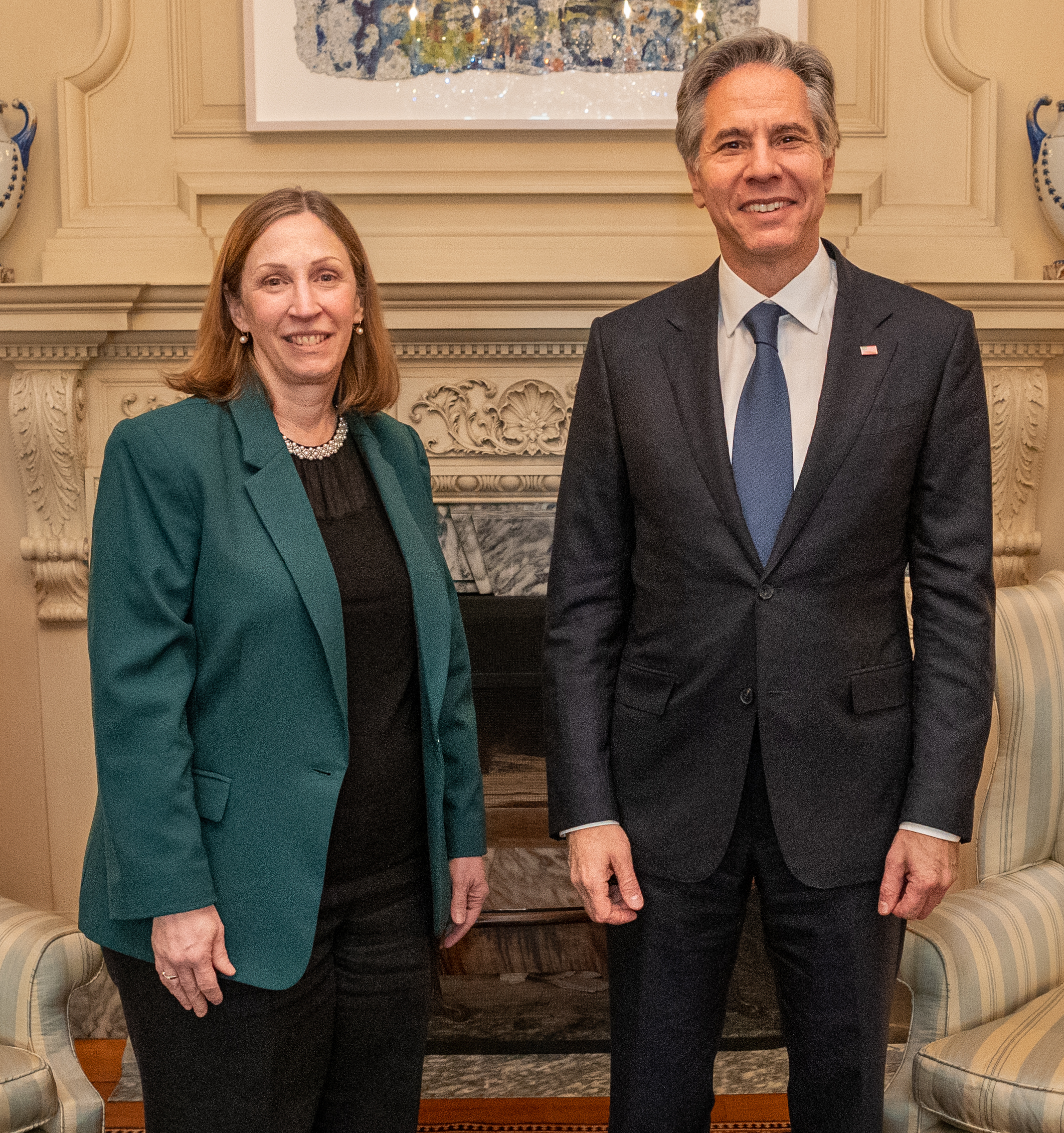
Tracy with Secretary of State Antony Blinken in 2023

Tracy was nominated by President Joe Biden on September 20, 2022, for the ambassadorship to Russia. Ambassador John Sullivan left Moscow on September 4, 2022, and stated he would retire. Hearings on her nomination were held before the Senate Foreign Relations Committee on November 30, 2022. The committee favorably reported her nomination to the Senate floor on December 7, 2022. Her nomination was confirmed by the United States Senate on December 21, 2022 by a 93–2 vote. She was sworn in on January 9, 2023, and presented her credentials at the end of that month.

== Personal life ==
Tracy speaks Russian.

== Distinctions ==
- Medal of Honour of the Foreign Ministry of Armenia.

== See also ==
- Ambassadors of the United States

Diplomatic posts
| Preceded by Richard M. Mills Jr. | United States Ambassador to Armenia; 2019–2022 | Succeeded by Kristina Kvien |
| Preceded by Elizabeth Rood; Chargée d'affaires ad interim | United States Ambassador to Russia; 2023–2025 | Vacant |
