= Richard M. Mills Jr. =

American diplomat (born 1959)

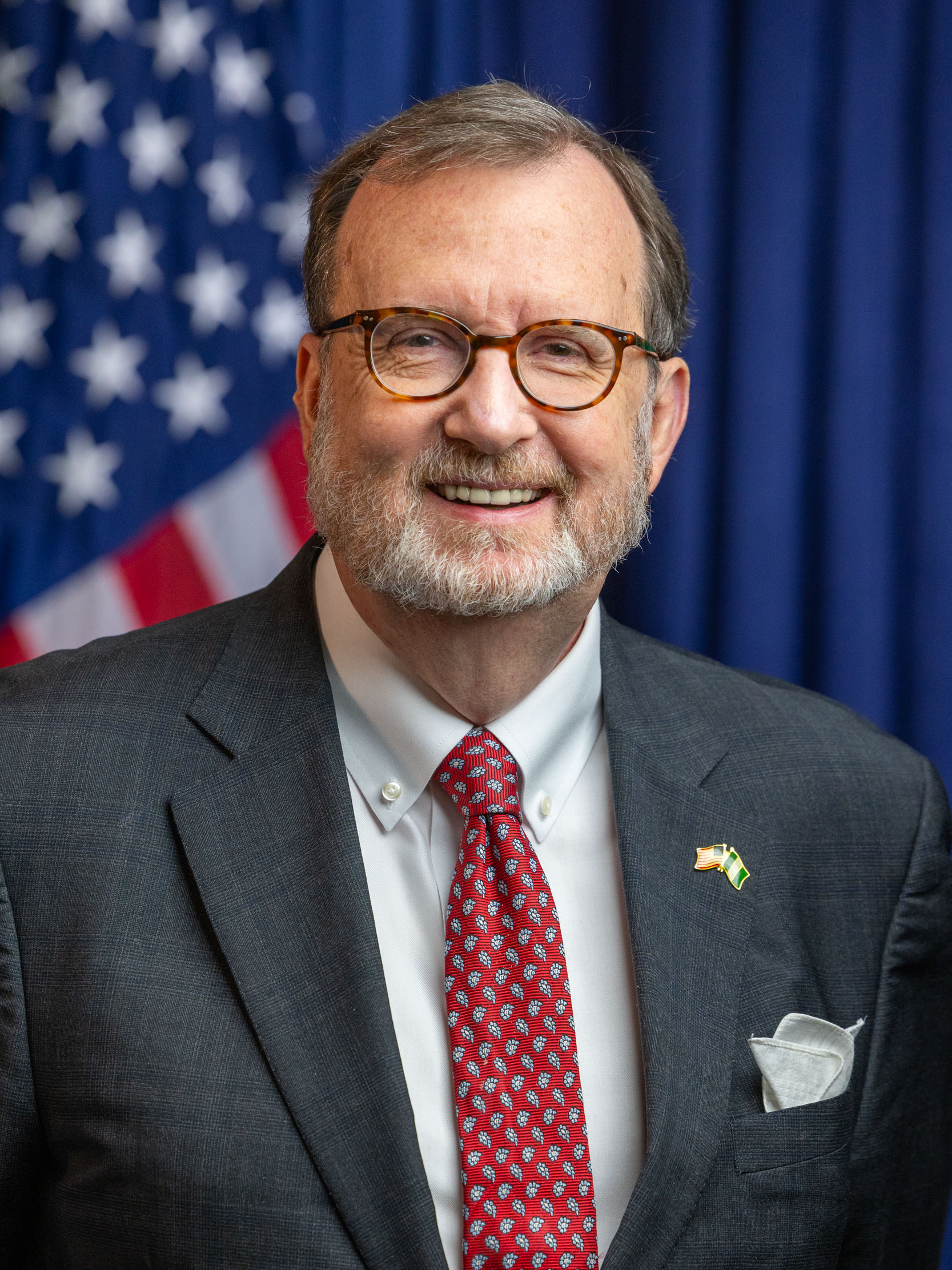
- Official portrait, 2024

United States Ambassador to Nigeria
- In office July 25, 2024 – January 16, 2026
- President: Joe Biden; Donald Trump
- Preceded by: Mary Beth Leonard

United States Deputy Ambassador to the United Nations
- In office November 9, 2020 – June 21, 2024
- President: Donald Trump; Joe Biden
- Preceded by: Jonathan Cohen
- Succeeded by: Dorothy Shea

United States Ambassador to the United Nations
- Chargé d'Affaires
- In office January 20, 2021 – February 25, 2021
- President: Joe Biden
- Preceded by: Kelly Craft
- Succeeded by: Linda Thomas-Greenfield

United States Ambassador to Canada
- Chargé d'Affaires
- In office August 23, 2019 – November 9, 2020
- President: Donald Trump
- Preceded by: Kelly Craft
- Succeeded by: Katherine Brucker (Chargé d'Affaires)

8th United States Ambassador to Armenia
- In office February 15, 2015 – October 17, 2018
- President: Barack Obama; Donald Trump
- Preceded by: John A. Heffern
- Succeeded by: Lynne M. Tracy

Personal details
- Born: Richard Merrill Mills Jr. February 23, 1959 (age 67) Louisiana, U.S.
- Education: Georgetown University (BA); University of Texas, Austin (JD); National Defense University (MS)

Richard Merrill Mills Jr. (born February 23, 1959) is an American diplomat who had served as the United States ambassador to Nigeria. He served as the United States deputy ambassador to the United Nations from 2020 to 2024 and, in that capacity, served as the U.S. Chargé d'Affaires and Acting Permanent Representative to the United Nations between January 20, 2021, and February 25, 2021, when Linda Thomas-Greenfield became ambassador. He previously served as the U.S. Chargé d'Affaires for Canada.

== Early life and education ==
Mills was born in Louisiana, and grew up in Michigan. He received a Bachelor of Arts from Georgetown University, a Juris Doctor from the University of Texas School of Law, and a Master of Science in National Security Strategy from the National Defense University.

== Career ==
=== Legal career ===
Prior to his Foreign Service career, Mills was an associate attorney in the Washington, D.C. office of Duncan, Allen and Mitchell, and then at the Washington, D.C. office of Wickwire, Gavin and Gibbs.

=== Diplomatic career ===
Mills's first tour as a Foreign Service Officer was at the U.S. embassy in Paris in 1988, where he served as a consular officer and staff assistant to Ambassador Walter Curley. He has had assignments in the Executive Secretariat at the Department of State (1996–1998), Dublin (1999–2001), the United States Mission to the United Nations in New York City (2001–2003), Islamabad (2003–2004), Riyadh (2005–2006), London (2006–2009), Baghdad (2009–2010), and Valletta (2010–2012). He then served as Deputy Chief of Mission at the U.S. embassy in Beirut, from 2012 to 2014. During his career, Mills has also served in the Office of Legislative Affairs, at the U.S. Consulate in Saint Petersburg, and in the now-defunct Bureau of Soviet Union Affairs. In July 2014, Mills was nominated by President Barack Obama to be the United States Ambassador to Armenia, a position in which he served until October 2018.

Mills holds the personal rank of Minister-Counselor in the United States Senior Foreign Service. He was a nominee for the Deputy Chief of Mission of the Year Award in 2012, and has received nine Superior Honor Awards from the Department of State. He speaks fluent French and conversational Russian.

==== Ambassador to Canada ====
In November 2018, Mills assumed the position of Deputy Chief of Mission at the Embassy of the United States in Ottawa. Following the resignation of United States Ambassador to Canada Kelly Craft in August 2019 upon her nomination to be US Ambassador to the UN, he became the acting Ambassador to Canada, with the title of Chargé d'affaires.

==== Deputy Ambassador to the UN ====
In January 2020, Mills was nominated to be the next United States Deputy Ambassador to the United Nations, again serving under now United States Ambassador to the United Nations Linda Thomas-Greenfield. He was confirmed by the Senate on August 6, 2020. He arrived on November 8, 2020.

==== Ambassador to Nigeria ====
On July 11, 2022, President Joe Biden announced his intent to nominate Mills to be the next United States ambassador to Nigeria. On July 28, 2022, his nomination was sent to the Senate. His nomination was not acted upon for the rest of the year and was returned to Biden on January 3, 2023.

President Biden renominated Mills the same day and a hearing on his nomination was held before the Senate Foreign Relations Committee on March 1, 2023. The committee favorably reported his nomination on July 13, 2023 and the Senate confirmed his nomination on May 2, 2024 by voice vote. He arrived in Nigeria on June 22, 2024. He presented his credentials to President of Nigeria on July 25, 2024.

== Previous roles in the Foreign Service ==
- Consular Officer at the U.S. Embassy in Paris, France (1988–1990)
- Desk Officer in the Bureau of Soviet Union Affairs, Washington D.C. (1990–1993)
- Political Officer at the U.S. Consulate in St. Petersburg, Russia (1993–1995)
- Legislative Affairs Officer at the Office of Legislative Affairs, Washington D.C. (1995–1996)
- Line Director in the Executive Secretariat at the Department of State, Washington D.C. (1996–1998)
- Economic Counselor at the U.S. Embassy in Dublin, Ireland (1999–2001)
- Political Officer at the U.S. Mission to the United Nations, New York (2001–2003)
- Deputy Political Counselor at the U.S. Embassy in Islamabad, Pakistan (2003–2004)
- Energy Attaché and Acting Economic Counselor at the U.S. Embassy in Riyadh, Saudi Arabia (2005–2006)
- Political Counselor at the U.S. Embassy in London, United Kingdom (2006–2009)
- Senior Democracy Advisor at the U.S. Embassy in Baghdad, Iraq (2009–2010)
- Deputy Chief of Mission and Chargé d'Affaires at the U.S. Embassy in Valletta, Malta (2010–2012)
- Deputy Chief of Mission at the U.S. Embassy in Beirut, Lebanon (2012–2014)
- Ambassador Extraordinary and Plenipotentiary to Armenia (2015–2018)
- Deputy Chief of Mission and Chargé d'Affaires at the U.S. Embassy in Ottawa, Canada (2018–2020)
- Deputy Representative, with rank and status of Ambassador Extraordinary and Plenipotentiary, and Chargé d'Affaires at the U.S. Mission to the United Nations in New York, and Deputy Representative to the U.N. Security Council (2020–2021)

== Personal life ==
Mills is married to Leigh Gabrielle Carter, a retired U.S. Foreign Service Officer. They were married on October 18, 1991, in Arlington, Virginia.

== See also ==
- Ambassadors of the United States

Diplomatic posts
Preceded by John Heffern	United States Ambassador to Armenia; 2015–2018	Succeeded by Lynne M. Tracy
Preceded by Kelly Craft	United States Ambassador to Canada; Acting; 2019–2020	Succeeded by Katherine Brucker; Acting
Preceded by Jonathan Cohen	United States Deputy Ambassador to the United Nations; 2020–2024	Succeeded by Dorothy Shea
Preceded by Kelly Craft	United States Ambassador to the United Nations; Acting; 2021	Succeeded by Linda Thomas-Greenfield
Preceded by Mary Beth Leonard	United States Ambassador to Nigeria; 2024–2026	Succeeded by Keith Heffern
