= John M. Ordway =

American diplomat (born 1950)

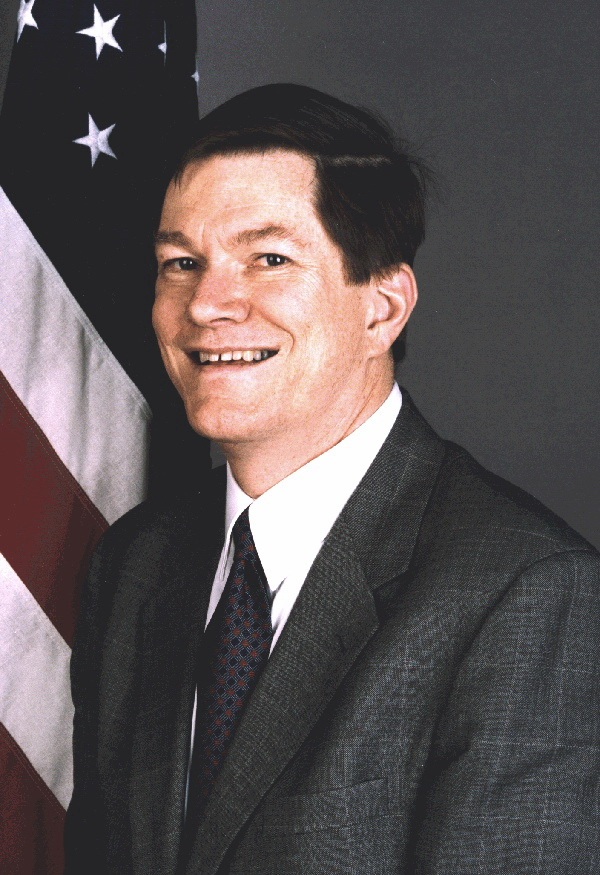

United States Ambassador to Kazakhstan
- In office September 17, 2004 – September 15, 2008
- President: George W. Bush
- Preceded by: Larry C. Napper
- Succeeded by: Richard E. Hoagland

4th United States Ambassador to Armenia
- In office November 23, 2001 – July 31, 2004
- President: George W. Bush
- Preceded by: Michael Craig Lemmon
- Succeeded by: John Marshall Evans

Personal details
- Born: 1950 (age 75–76) California, U.S.
- Education: Stanford University; University of California

John Malcolm Ordway (born 1950) is an American retired diplomat who was a Senior Foreign Service officer in the United States Foreign Service until 2008. Prior to his retirement, he served as the United States Ambassador to Kazakhstan from September 17, 2004 to September 15, 2008, and as the United States Ambassador to Armenia from November 2001 to July 2004.

== Life and career ==
Ordway graduated from Stanford University in 1972 and the University of California's Hastings College of Law in 1975. He speaks Russian, French, Italian, Czech, Kazakh, and Armenian.

Following his retirement, the United States Department of State tapped Mr. Ordway to serve as interim Chargé d'Affaires at five United States embassies: Kathmandu, Nepal (December 2009 – January 2010), Sofia, Bulgaria (August 2009 – November 2009), Vienna, Austria (May 2009 – July 2009), Prague, Czech Republic (May 2010 – August 2010), and Astana, Kazakhstan (January 2011 – July 2011, and again from October 2013 - December 2014).

Ordway’s distinguished career with the Foreign Service began in 1975. He has an extensive background in Soviet and Russian affairs, as well as experience in European security affairs, conflict resolution, and peacekeeping operations. Prior becoming a Senior Foreign Service officer, Ordway served abroad at the U.S. Embassies in Prague (1978–1981), Moscow (1985–87), and in Brussels at the U.S. Mission to NATO (1993–1995). He was in Moscow from 1996 to 2001, serving the last two years as Deputy Chief of Mission. While in Moscow, he also was chairman of Anglo-American School Board during the successful construction of a new 1200-student facility.

In Washington, Ordway worked in the State Department’s Press Office, the Office of Southern African Affairs, and twice in the Office of Soviet Union Affairs. He served twice as Director of African Affairs for the National Security Council (NSC). During this period, he was a member of the U.S. negotiating team that achieved and then helped implement the agreement that led to Cuban withdrawal from Angola and the independence of Namibia. At the NSC, he was deeply involved in the decision-making process in 1992–1993 that led to American military participation in efforts to overcome starvation in Somalia.

Diplomatic posts
Preceded by Michael Craig Lemmon	United States Ambassador to Armenia; 2001–2004	Succeeded by John Marshall Evans
Preceded by Larry C. Napper	United States Ambassador to Kazakhstan; 2004–2008	Succeeded by Richard E. Hoagland
