= Harry J. Gilmore =

American diplomat

Harry Gilmore
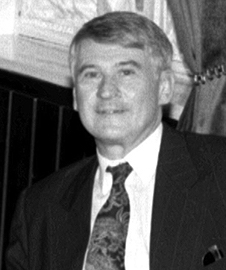

1st United States Ambassador to Armenia
- In office May 31, 1993 – July 11, 1995
- President: Bill Clinton
- Preceded by: Position established
- Succeeded by: Peter Tomsen

Personal details
- Born: November 16, 1937 McKeesport, Pennsylvania, U.S.
- Died: April 23, 2015 (aged 77) Dumfries, Virginia, U.S.
- Education: University of Pittsburgh; Indiana University Bloomington

Harry Joseph Gilmore (November 16, 1937 – April 23, 2015) was an American diplomat who served as the first U.S. Ambassador to Armenia.

== Early life and education ==
Gilmore was born in McKeesport, Pennsylvania, and raised in Clairton, Pennsylvania. He graduated from Clairton High School in 1955 as class president. He attended Carnegie Mellon University for two years to study piano, before graduating in 1960 from the University of Pittsburgh. Gilmore then pursued Russian and East European studies at Indiana University Bloomington.

== Career ==
Gilmore's rise in the foreign service included working as deputy commandant for international affairs at the United States Army War College. Gilmore served as Deputy Chief of Mission at the American Embassy in Belgrade from 1981 to 1985, and was the Deputy Director for Eastern European and Yugoslav Affairs at the United States Department of State.

Gilmore was the U.S. Minister and Deputy Commandant of the American Sector in Berlin from 1987-1990. He contributed to ensuring the safety of thousands of East Berliners, who moved to Southern Berlin after the fall of the Berlin Wall.

President George H. W. Bush tapped Gilmore as U.S. ambassador to Armenia in August 1992, but his nomination was not acted upon by the United States Senate. Gilmore was nominated for the second time by President Bill Clinton on April 2, 1993, and confirmed by the Senate.

After his retirement from the foreign service in 1997 after 36 years of service, Mr. Gilmore served as a dean at the Foreign Service Institute in Arlington County, Virginia.

== Personal life ==
An accomplished pianist, Gilmore would often accompany his wife who was a professional singer. The couple would present American show tunes and other music at U.S. embassy events.
