= Tatiana C. Gfoeller =

American diplomat

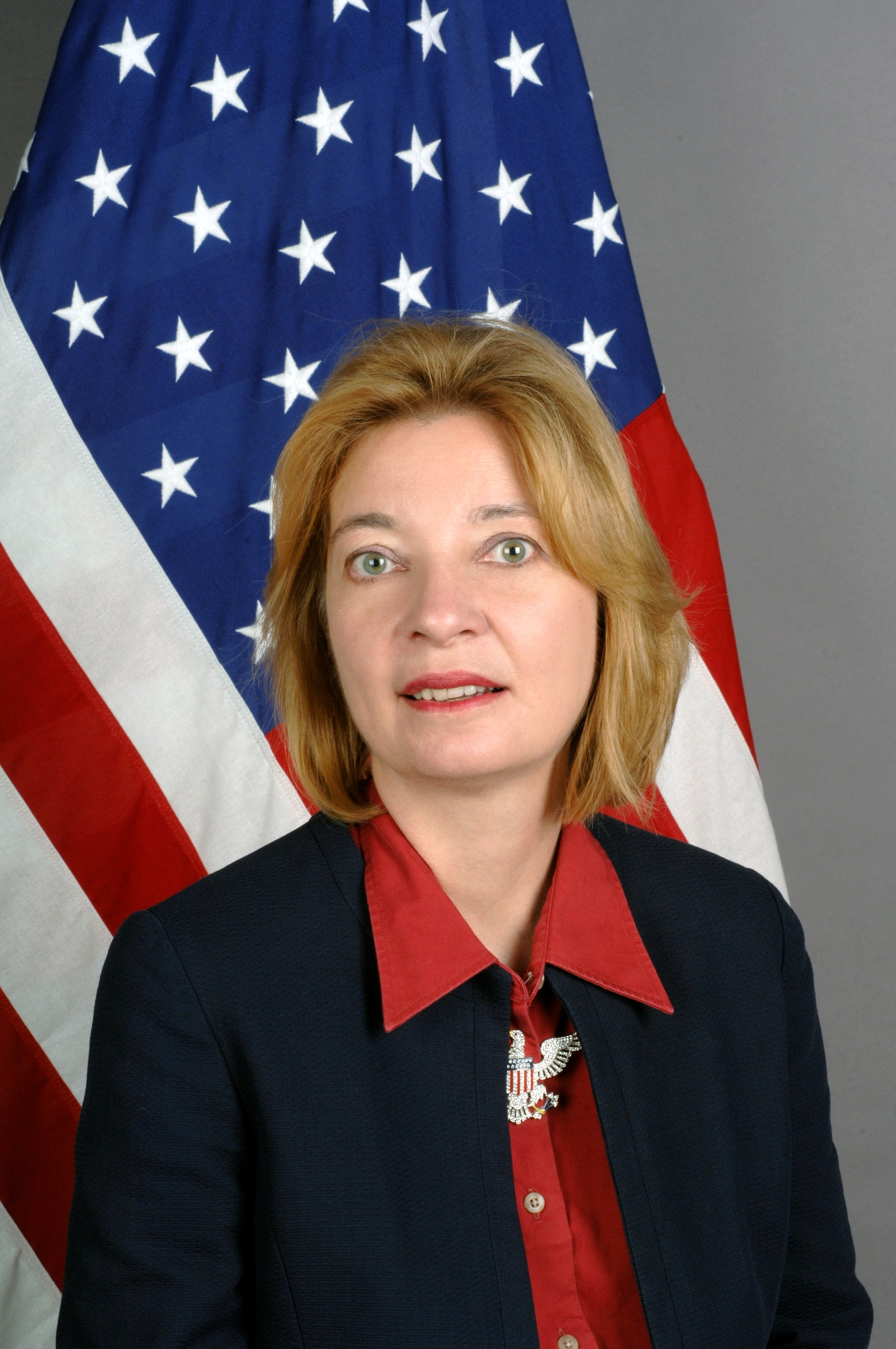
Tatiana C. Gfoeller

Tatiana C. Gfoeller (born 1960) is a veteran American diplomat. Since joining the Department of State in 1984, her foreign postings have included Poland, Saudi Arabia, Bahrain, the Soviet Union, Belgium, Russia, and Turkmenistan. Gfoeller has served as a Deputy Chief of Mission in Turkmenistan, Deputy Principal Officer in Russia, and Consul General in Jeddah, Saudi Arabia. She was awarded the Rusk Fellowship in 2000. Additionally, Gfoeller authored a book on U.S. foreign policy interests in the Caspian Basin and has taught master's degree classes in political science at Georgetown University. She is a member of numerous foreign affairs organizations, including the Council on Foreign Relations and speaks Russian, French, Polish, Italian, Spanish, and Arabic. From 2011 to 2017, Gfoeller was a political adviser to the U.S. Joint Chiefs of Staff in the Pentagon. From 2008 to 2011, she served as Ambassador to the Kyrgyz Republic. Her father was the French writer of Russian extraction Vladimir Volkoff. Gfoeller served as President of American Women for International Understanding, an international women's rights NGO, from 2020 to 2022 and is now on its board of directors. Since 2022, Ambassador Gfoeller has been serving as the Global Ambassador-at-Large of the ACE Health Foundation.

Ambassador Gfoeller published her first novel, “A Simple Love,” in 2021. She is presently at work on a second novel.

Her husband is Michael Gfoeller. They have one son, Major Emmanuel Gfoeller, an Army Ranger.
