= Bruce I. Turner =

American diplomat

Bruce Turner
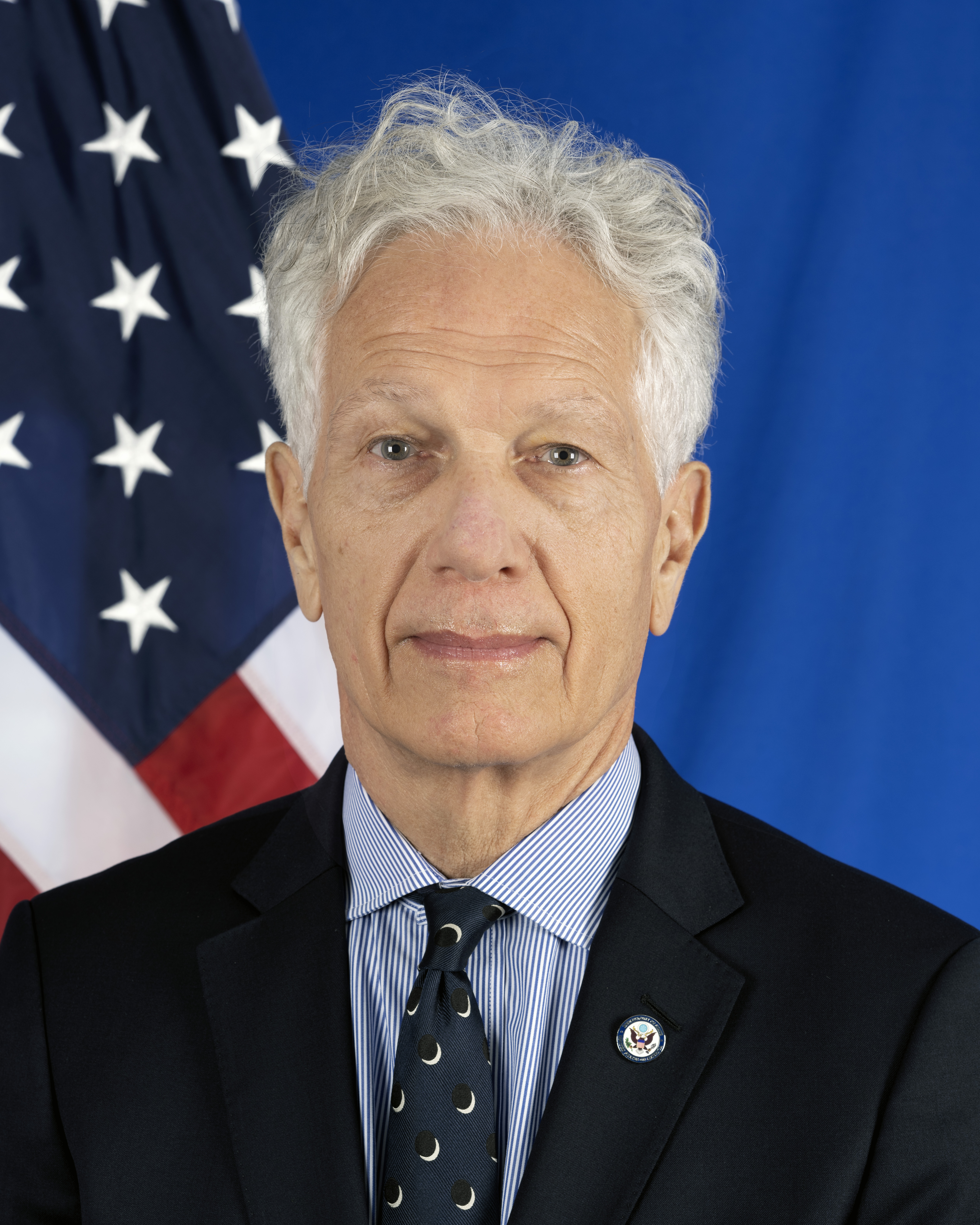
- Turner in 2022

U.S. Representative to the Conference on Disarmament
- In office September 22, 2022 – January 20, 2025
- President: Joe Biden; Donald Trump
- Preceded by: Robert A. Wood

Bruce I. Turner is an American diplomat who had served the U.S. representative to the Conference on Disarmament, with the rank of Ambassador.

== Early life and education ==
Turner obtained a B.A. at Colorado College, as well as an M.A. and Ph.D. at the University of Virginia.

== Career ==
In his most recent role, Turner was the Senior Bureau Official of the Bureau of Arms Control, Verification and Compliance at the Department of State. He also served as Acting Principal Deputy Assistant Secretary and Deputy Assistant Secretary for Verification, Planning and European Security. He served as Consul General at the U.S. Consulate General in St. Petersburg, Russia, and served as director of the Office of International Anti-Narcotics and Law Enforcement at the U.S. Embassy in Kabul. Other embassy assignments include Paris, Moscow, and Ankara. Stateside, Turner was the Director of the Office of European Security and Political Affairs, as well as the Agreed Framework Coordinator in the Office of Korean Affairs. He served at the U.S. Mission to the Organization for Security and Cooperation in Europe (OSCE) in Vienna and the U.S. Mission to NATO in Brussels.

=== Conference on Disarmament ===
On October 8, 2021, President Joe Biden nominated Turner to be the U.S Representative to the Conference on Disarmament with the rank of Ambassador. Hearings on his nomination were held before the Senate Foreign Relations Committee on May 4, 2022. The committee favorably reported his nomination to the Senate floor on May 18, 2022. His nomination was confirmed by the United States Senate on September 13, 2022.

== Personal life ==
Turner speaks German, French and Russian.
