= John A. Heffern =

American diplomat

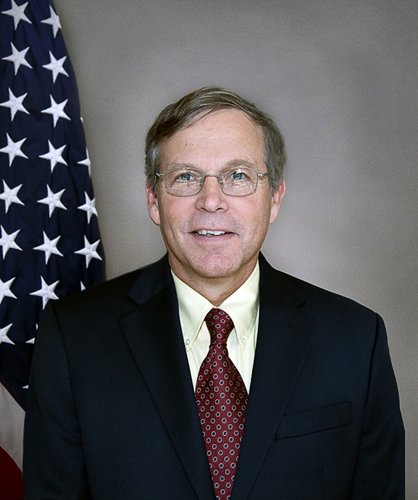

Assistant Secretary of State for European and Eurasian Affairs Acting
- In office January 20, 2017 – August 23, 2017
- President: Donald Trump
- Preceded by: Victoria Nuland
- Succeeded by: A. Wess Mitchell

7th United States Ambassador to Armenia
- In office October 6, 2011 – December 22, 2014
- President: Barack Obama
- Preceded by: Marie L. Yovanovitch
- Succeeded by: Richard M. Mills Jr.

Personal details
- Born: 1953 (age 72–73) Saint Louis, Missouri
- Education: Michigan State University (B.A.)

John A. Heffern (born 1953) is an American diplomat. Heffern served as the United States Ambassador to Armenia from 2011 to 2014. After being nominated on May 18, 2011 by United States President Barack Obama, Heffern was confirmed by the U.S. Senate on September 26, 2011 and sworn in as ambassador on October 6, 2011. He was replaced by Ambassador Richard M. Mills Jr. in early 2015.

== Early life and education ==
Heffern was born in Saint Louis, Missouri, the son of Elleard Buridan Heffern and Beulah "Jo" Heffern. His father served briefly in the Foreign Service, and met his wife in India. Heffern's mother is a naturalized citizen. After graduating from the Saint Louis Priory School, Heffern attended Michigan State University, receiving his B.A. in 1976.

== Career ==
After college, Heffern served in the office of Senator John C. Danforth (R-Mo.) as the Senator's Office Director and Research Assistant. He joined the Foreign Service in 1982 and has been a career Senior Foreign Service officer ever since. His early postings included in China, Taiwan, and Ivory Coast. He was later assigned to Kuala Lumpur, and then held postings in Washington, among them as Malaysia Desk Officer, related to Southeast Asia. From 1994 to 1996, he served as a Pearson Fellow on the Asia Subcommittee for the House International Relations Committee, for Congressman Doug Bereuter (R-Nebraska). He subsequently served as Deputy Political Counselor at the U.S. Mission to NATO (USNATO).

Following postings in the Human Resources Bureau in Washington as Executive Assistant to Under Secretary for Political Affairs and as Deputy Chief of Mission at U. S. Embassy, Jakarta, Indonesia, he reported in 2009 to the U. S. Mission to NATO as the Deputy Permanent Representative. Most recently, he has served as Deputy Chief of Mission (DCM) at USNATO, in Brussels, Belgium.

== Ambassadorship to Armenia ==
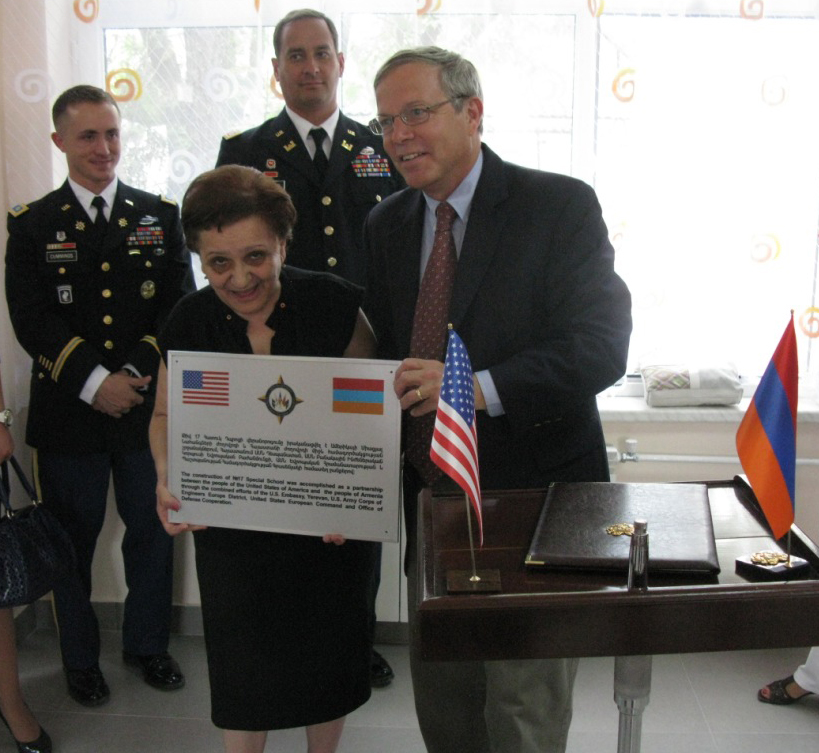
Heffern in 2013

Initially, U. S. Senator Robert Menendez (D-N.J.) held up Heffern's nomination as a protest against President Barack Obama's "refusal to characterize the Turkish killing of Armenians during World War I as a 'genocide.'" At his confirmation hearing before the Senate Foreign Relations Committee, Heffern dodged the controversy by stating that "the characterization of those events...is a policy decision that is made by the President of the United States.", He was later unanimously approved by the Senate Foreign Relations Committee, and confirmed by the U. S. Senate.

In the fall of 2011, Heffern expressed his view that Armenia's elections in 2012 and 2013 would be "regarded as democratic," and described his meetings with Armenian president Serge Sargsyan and Foreign Minister Eduard Nalbandian as "'very good'."

On April 3, 2012, addressing a meeting in Yerevan, Armenia dedicated to the 20th anniversary of Armenia-U. S. relations, According to the Yerevan Report, Ambassador Heffern stated that "bilateral dialogue between the two countries is held at the highest level." Proof of this includes the facts that "Armenian President Serge Sargsyan had a meeting with US President Obama and...US State Secretary Clinton paid a visit to Armenia--for the first time during the last 18 years."

Heffern followed his predecessor by posting video blogs on topics related to Armenia and his service in that country to YouTube, under the "usembassyarmenia" tag.

His term ended on December 22, 2014.

Heffern later served, for several months in 2017, as the Acting Assistant Secretary of State for European and Eurasian Affairs, before being removed in August.

Diplomatic posts
Preceded by Marie L. Yovanovitch	United States Ambassador to Armenia; 2011–2014	Succeeded by Richard M. Mills Jr.
