= Robert A. Wood =

American diplomat

Robert Wood
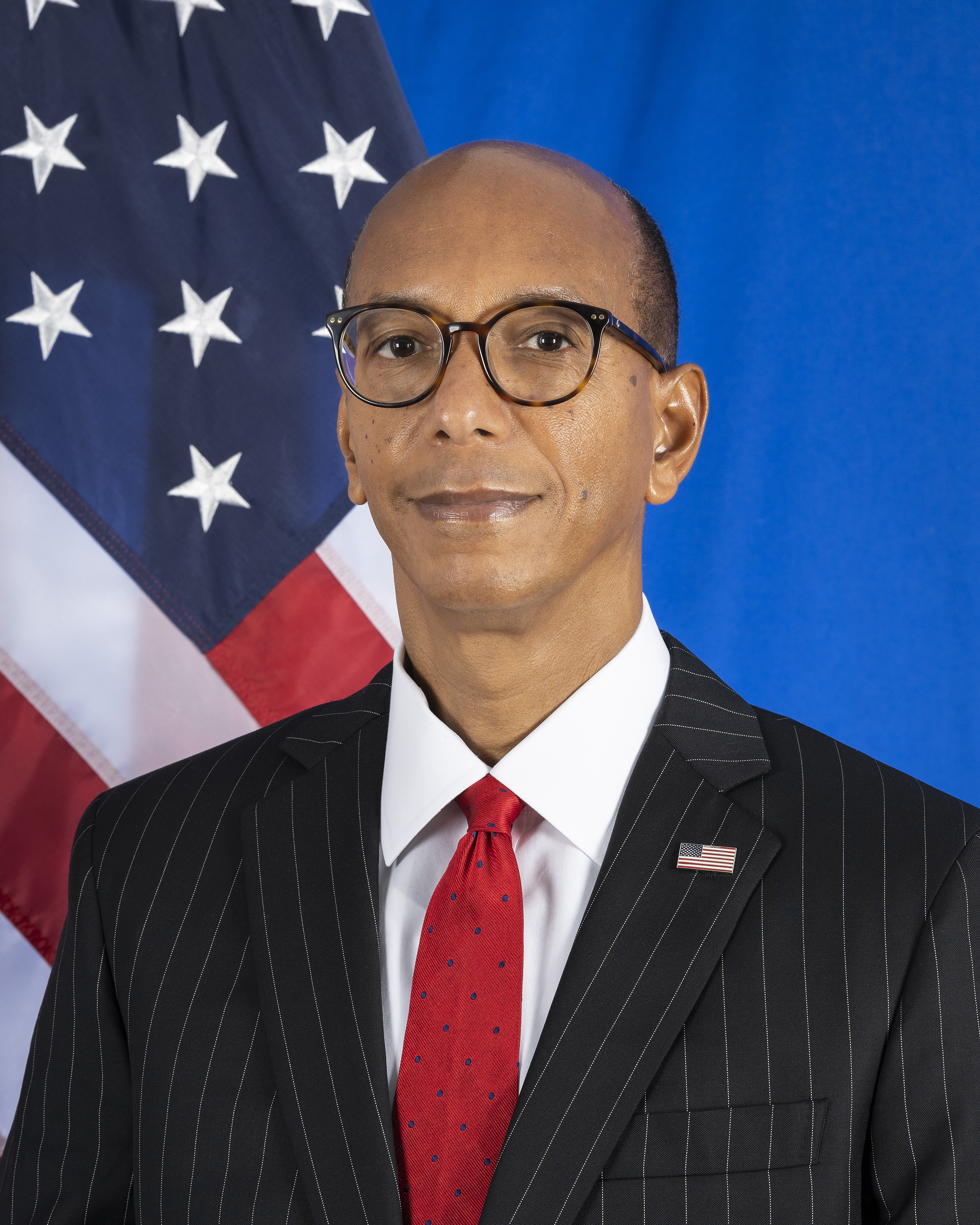
- Official portrait, 2022

U.S. Alternate Representative for Special Political Affairs in the United Nations
- In office October 6, 2022 – January 20, 2025
- President: Joe Biden
- Preceded by: David Pressman
- Succeeded by: Jennifer Locetta

U.S. Representative to the Conference on Disarmament
- In office August 13, 2014 – October 2021
- President: Barack Obama; Donald Trump; Joe Biden
- Preceded by: Laura E. Kennedy
- Succeeded by: Bruce I. Turner

Personal details
- Spouse: Gita Gouri
- Children: 1
- Education: City University of New York (AB)

Robert A. Wood is an American diplomat who served as the alternate representative of the United States of America for special political affairs in the United Nations from 2022 to 2025, with the rank of ambassador.

== Early life and education ==
Wood earned a BA in 1985 from the City University of New York.

== Career ==
Wood served as the U.S. ambassador to the Conference on Disarmament in Geneva, Switzerland, from 2014 until 2021. During that time, he also served as the United States commissioner to the Bilateral Consultative Commission of the New START Treaty, and as the United States special representative for Biological Weapons Convention (BWC) issues. He was deputy chief of mission, U.S. Mission to the European Union in Brussels, Belgium. He also served as deputy chief of mission at the U.S. Mission to International Organizations in Vienna, Austria. Wood was the deputy spokesperson and deputy assistant secretary of state in the Bureau of Public Affairs in the Department of State, and an information officer at U.S. Embassy in Berlin, Germany. Wood was also deputy director of communications and spokesperson at the U.S. Mission to the United Nations in New York City.

Other assignments include senior advisor in the Office of the Stability Pact for Southeast Europe; special assistant in the office of the under secretary of state for public diplomacy and public affairs; executive assistant in the office of the counselor of the United States Information Agency; public affairs officer in the Bureau of African Affairs; desk officer for Egypt, Yemen, and Sudan; and Near East Regional program officer in the United States Information Agency. Other overseas postings include Islamabad, Pakistan, Lagos, Nigeria, and Mexico City, Mexico.

=== Alternate Representative to the UN ===
On December 15, 2021, President Joe Biden nominated Wood to be the alternate representative of the United States of America for special political affairs in the United Nations, with the rank of ambassador. Hearings on his nomination were held before the Senate Foreign Relations Committee on June 23, 2022. The committee favorably reported his nomination on July 19, 2022. His nomination was confirmed before the full United States Senate.

On December 8, 2023, Wood voted against a UN resolution for a permanent ceasefire in Gaza which acted as a veto against it, stating the resolution "will only plant the seeds for the next war" and "was divorced from reality."

== Personal life ==
Wood speaks Spanish, German, and French.
