= Sylvia Reed Curran =

Member of the United States Foreign Service

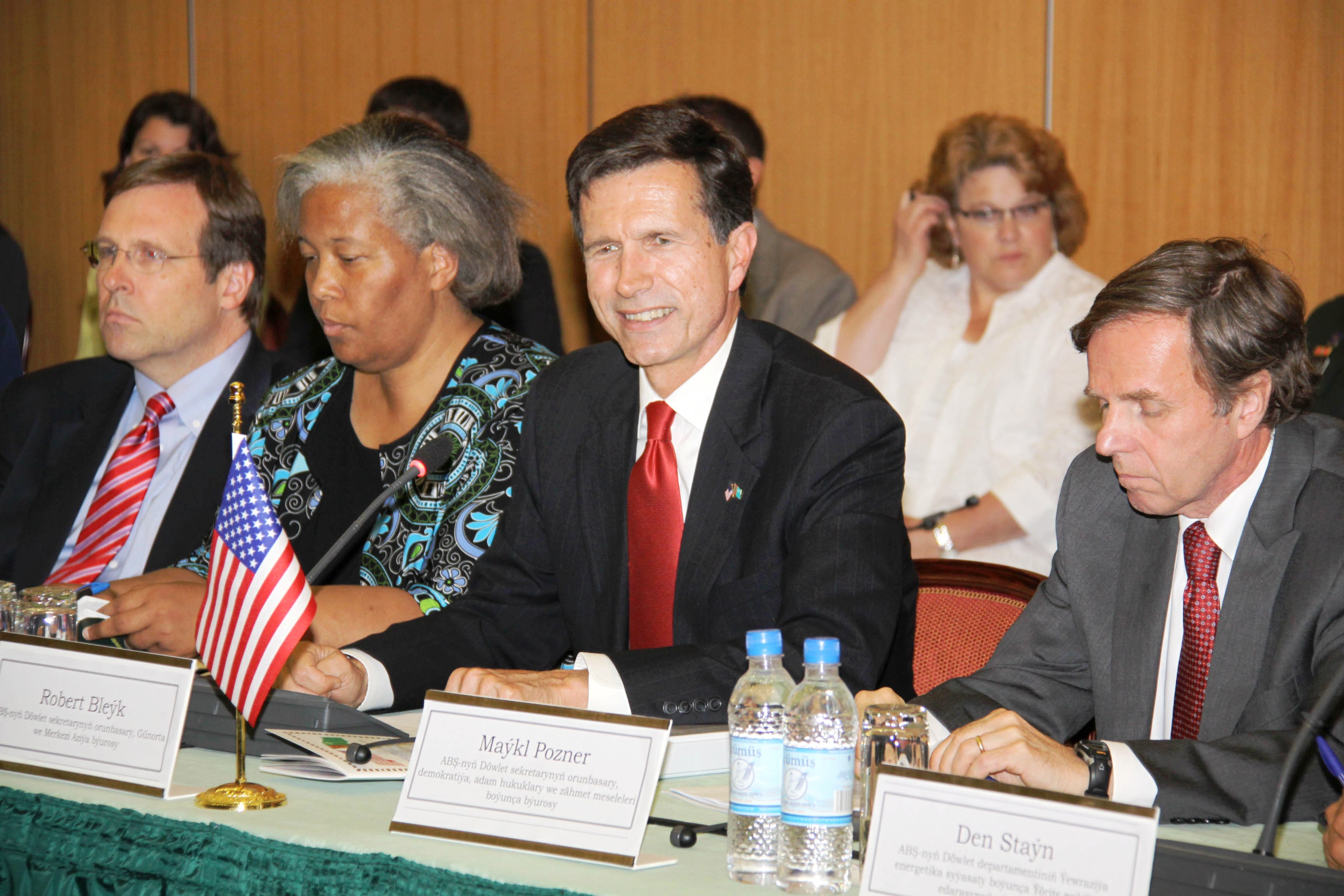
Assistant Secretary Blake, Assistant Secretary Posner, and Chargé d'Affaires Sylvia Curran Participate in the Opening of the Annual Bilateral Consultations (ABCs) (4749207724)

Sylvia Reed Curran (1958 – September 19, 2021) was a career member of the United States Foreign Service who served as the Deputy Chief of Mission and Chargé d'Affaires in Turkmenistan, Ashgabat (2007–2010), and Consul General in Vladivostok, Russia (2010–2013).

Curran began with the State Department in 1987 after working in cytogenetics at the University of Chicago. Curran earned a BS in Biology and AAS in Chemistry from the University of Alaska, studied Medical Technology at the University of Hawaiʻi, and received an MS in National Resource Strategy from National Defense University.
