= Laura E. Kennedy =

American diplomat

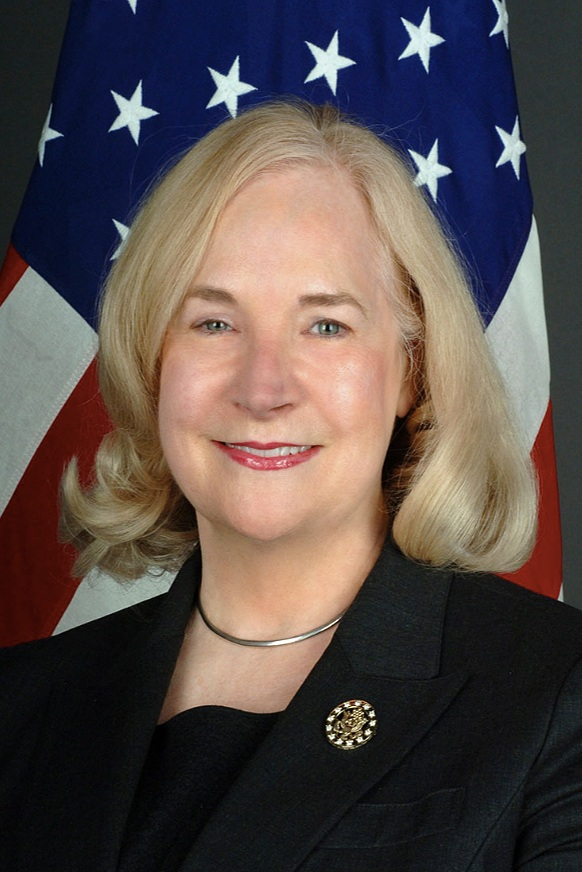

U.S. Ambassador to Turkmenistan
- In office October 2001 – July 2003
- President: George W. Bush
- Preceded by: Steven Robert Mann
- Succeeded by: Tracey Ann Jacobson

U.S. Permanent Representative to the Conference on Disarmament
- In office March 2010 – June 2013
- President: Barack Obama
- Preceded by: Christina Rocca
- Succeeded by: Robert A. Wood

Personal details
- Born: 1951 (age 74–75) Coronado, California, U.S.
- Spouse: John J. Feeney
- Children: 2
- Education: Vassar College; American University

Laura Elizabeth Kennedy (born 1951) is a retired United States career diplomat, who has served as U.S. Ambassador to Turkmenistan, U.S. Permanent Representative to the Conference on Disarmament in Geneva, and Deputy Assistant Secretary of State.

After retirement in 2013, she was recalled to service in 2014 to serve as Chargé d'Affaires at the U.S. Embassy in Turkmenistan and then the U.S. Mission to International Organizations in Vienna (UNVIE), leaving government again in 2015. She is active lecturing and commenting on foreign affairs, arms control and U.S. politics. She serves on the boards of Foreign Policy for America and the Arms Control Association. She is a member of the Szilard Advisory Board of the Center for Arms Control and Nonproliferation, the Deep Cuts Commission, the American Academy of Diplomacy, and the Leadership Council for Women in National Security.

== Early life and education ==
Kennedy was born in Coronado, California to a Navy family. She graduated from Falls Church High School and Vassar College where she was a member of the last all-female entering class of the American women's college. She studied Indonesian language at Cornell and the University of Wisconsin before earning an M.A. from American University in Washington D.C. She spent a sabbatical year at Stanford University 1982–83.

== State Department career ==
Kennedy joined the U.S. Foreign Service in 1975. She served on the People's Republic of China and Mongolian Affairs Office until her assignment to the U.S. Embassy in Moscow 1977–1979. During that time, she worked as a guide with an official U.S. exhibit touring the Soviet republics of Ukraine, Tajikistan and Kazakhstan.

After serving on the Soviet Desk, she returned to Moscow in 1983–1985 as the Embassy “Kremlinologist”. She was a member of the U.S. Delegation in Vienna 1985–1989 to the conventional forces negotiations (M.B.F.R. and C.F.E.).

During Kennedy's time at the U.S.Embassy in Ankara 1990–1993, she was detailed to Operation Provide Comfort in the wake of the Kurdish refugee crisis after the Gulf War. She was briefly detailed to the new U.S. Embassy in Armenia as Chargé d'Affaires after the breakup of the Soviet Union.

During her tenure as deputy director on the Office of Lebanon, Jordan, Syria and Palestinian Affairs 1995–1997, she worked on new U.S. relations with the Palestinians and new regional cooperation with Israel. As Director for Central Asia 1995–1997, Kennedy developed U.S.relations with the new independent states of the former Soviet Union and helped integrate them in regional and international institutions.

Kennedy served as Deputy Chief of Mission at UNVIE 1998–2001 until her appointment as U.S. Ambassador to Turkmenistan where she focused on supporting civil society and encouraging Turkmen support for operations in Afghanistan.

Kennedy returned to Washington in 2003 as Dean of the Senior Seminar, the State Department's inter-agency leadership program. 2004–2005, she was Deputy Assistant Secretary of State for Southern Europe, Central Asia and the Caucasus. She taught at the National War College 2007–2009 where she also served as Deputy Commandant. She was Ambassador to the Conference on Disarmament in Geneva 2010–2013 and concurrently Special Representative for Biological Weapons Convention Issues.

She was awarded the Secretary's Career Achievement award upon her retirement in 2013. She was previously awarded the Distinguished Honor Award and numerous Merit and Superior Honor Awards by the State Department. She was recalled to service in 2014 to run the U.S. Embassy in Turkmenistan and then the U.S.Mission to International Organizations in Vienna (UNVIE) until 2015.

Kennedy was a member of the National Finance Committee for the 2016 Clinton Campaign. She is a founding board member of Foreign Policy 4 America and also serves on the board of the Arms Control Association. She served on the board for the World Affairs Council-DC 2017–2019. She currently serves on the Szilard Advisory Board of the Center for Arms Control and Non Proliferation. She is a member of the U.S.-Russia-German Deep Cuts Commission and was elected to the American Academy of Diplomacy. She serves on the Leadership Council for Women in National Security (LC-WINS).

Kennedy has lectured at universities and institutions including as the visiting DACOR Diplomat at the U.S. Army Command and General Staff College 2016–17. She is a commentator on foreign affairs and arms control. She has served as expert on “Silk Road” journeys for the New York Times and the Smithsonian Institution.

== Personal life ==
Kennedy is married to former U.S. diplomat John J. Feeney and is the mother of two children.
