= Jennifer Leigh Brush =

American Career Foreign Service Officer

Jennifer Leigh Brush (born 1956) is a retired American Career Foreign Service Officer who served as Chargé d'Affaires ad interim to Turkmenistan from July 2006 until July 2007. Another State Department source says “Term of Appointment: 08/01/2006 to 10/30/2007”

Brush also served with Organization for Security and Cooperation in Europe and U.N. Peacekeeping. She retired in 2014 and unsuccessfully ran for mayor of Solon, Ohio in 2017.

== Education ==
Brush earned a BA from Sophie Newcomb College of Tulane University, and her MPP from the Woodrow Wilson School of Public and International Affairs at Princeton University. She also studied at the University of Washington's Jackson School of Russian and East European Studies and at the Political Science Faculties of the Universities of Zagreb and Sarajevo in the former Yugoslavia.
