= John E. Herbst =

American diplomat

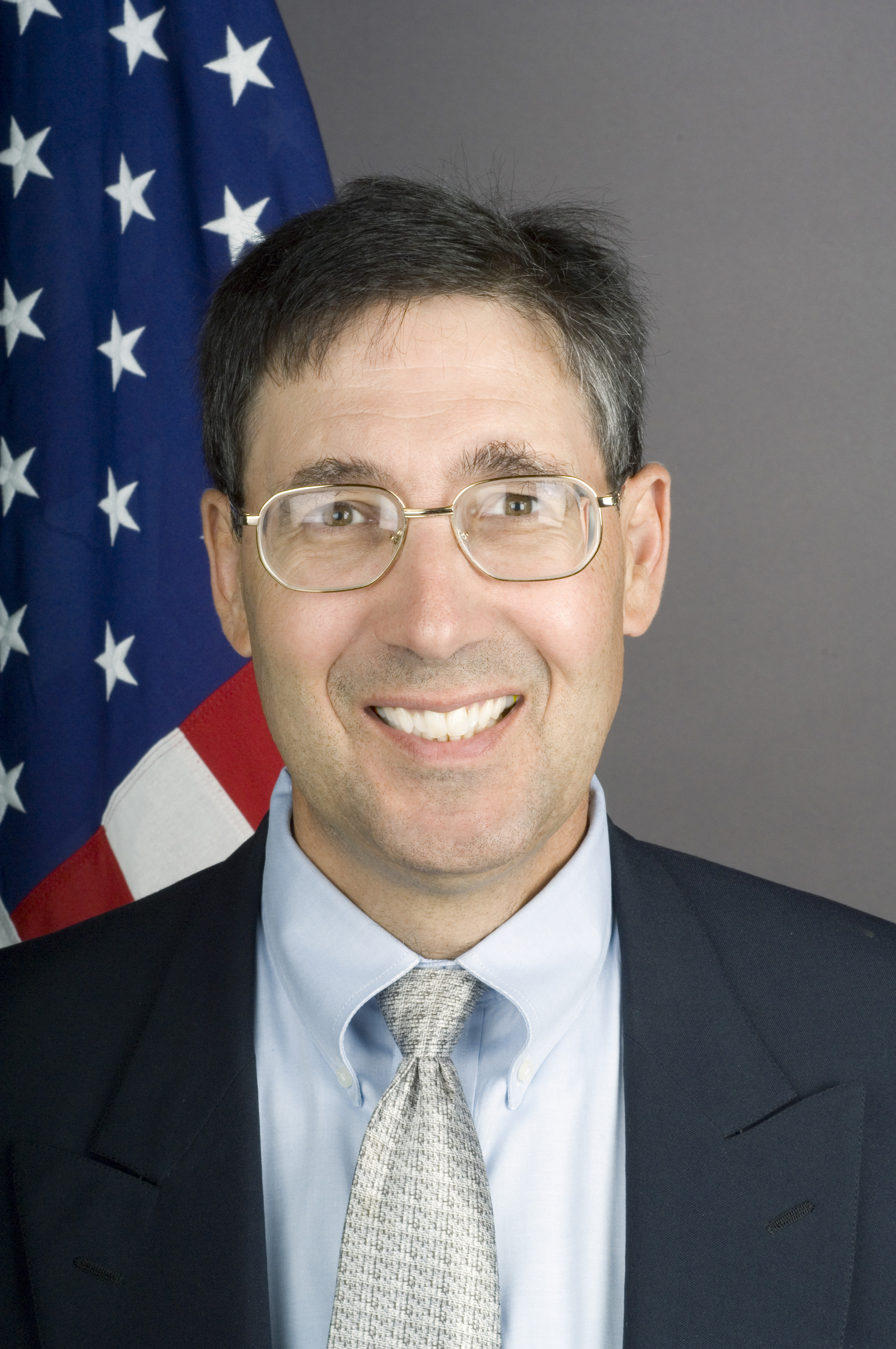

5th United States Ambassador to Ukraine
- In office July 1, 2003 – May 26, 2006
- President: George W. Bush
- Preceded by: Carlos Pascual
- Succeeded by: William B. Taylor, Jr.

5th United States Ambassador to Uzbekistan
- In office November 1, 2000 – July 12, 2003
- President: Bill Clinton; George W. Bush
- Preceded by: Joseph A. Presel
- Succeeded by: Jon Purnell

United States Consul General in Jerusalem
- In office 1998–2000
- President: Bill Clinton
- Preceded by: Edward Abington Jr.
- Succeeded by: Ronald Schlicher

Personal details
- Born: August 12, 1952 (age 74) Rockville Centre, New York, U.S.
- Spouse: Nadezda Christoff Herbst (m. 1978; died 2014)
- Children: 5
- Education: Georgetown University (BS); Tufts University (MA)
- Profession: Diplomat

John Edward Herbst (born August 12, 1952) is a retired American diplomat who was the United States Ambassador to Uzbekistan from 2000 to 2003 and United States Ambassador to Ukraine from September 2003 to May 2006.

== Education ==
Herbst received a Bachelor of Science in Foreign Service from the School of Foreign Service at Georgetown University in 1974 and a Master of Arts in Law and Diplomacy from the Fletcher School of Law and Diplomacy at Tufts University (Medford, MA) in 1978. He also attended the Johns Hopkins University School of Advanced International Studies in Bologna, Italy. Herbst was married for 37 years until her death in 2014 to Nadezda Christoff Herbst; he has five children and five grandchildren.

== Career ==
Herbst joined the United States Foreign Service in 1979. He has worked as a political counselor at the U.S. embassies in Tel Aviv, Moscow, and Riyadh. He has also worked as the Director of Regional Affairs in the Near East Bureau of the United States State Department, as Director of the Office of Independent States and Commonwealth Affairs, as Principal Deputy to the Ambassador-at-large for the Newly Independent States, and as U.S. Consul General in Jerusalem. He was appointed Ambassador to Uzbekistan in 2000, and to Ukraine in 2003. In 2006, Secretary of State Condoleezza Rice appointed Ambassador Herbst as Coordinator for the Office of Reconstruction and Stabilization. He assumed the new position in the summer of that year. Currently he is Senior Director of the Eurasia Center at the Atlantic Council. He advocates strong military support for Ukraine as he views Putin's aims in Europe to be malevolent with a complete destruction of Ukrainian culture and independence.

=== National Defense University Center for Complex Operations ===
Ambassador John E. Herbst was appointed Director of the National Defense University Center for Complex Operations in July 2010. As Director, Ambassador Herbst will use his 30 years of United States Foreign Service experience to benefit the careers of professionals who will become the next generation of national defense practitioners. As a stability expert, Ambassador Herbst will provide guidance to students and faculty at the National Defense University.

=== Coordinator for Reconstruction and Stabilization ===
Ambassador Herbst assumed the position of Coordinator for Reconstruction and Stabilization in the summer of 2006. During his tenure, Ambassador Herbst launched the Civilian Response Corps, grew its ranks to over 1,000, and oversaw their missions in countries that include Sudan, Chad, Haiti, Lebanon, Kosovo, Iraq and Afghanistan. Under Ambassador Herbst's direction the Civilian Response Corps and the Office of the Coordinator for Reconstruction and Stabilization supported over 20 U.S. Embassies. His responsibilities included planning and coordinating to prevent conflict and deliver sustainable stabilization solutions to countries in danger of, emerging from or in conflict.

Ambassador Herbst was particularly successful in building interagency support and using the concept of smart power through policy committees and coordination teams that include persons from the United States Agency for International Development and the departments of Justice, Commerce, Agriculture, Homeland Security, Health and Human Services and Treasury.

==== US and Australia memorandum of understanding ====
In October 2009 Australian Prime Minister Kevin Rudd announced the creation of the Australian Civilian Corps (ACC) at the East Asia Summit in Thailand. In order to collaborate and build capacity of S/CRS and the ACC, Ambassador Herbst coordinated the signing of a memorandum. The memorandum detailed how the two organizations would exchange lessons learned and performance measurement methodologies in order to arrive at conflict prevention and reconstruction and stabilization goals. The memorandum focuses on building sustainable peace through enhancing interoperability among civilian reconstruction and stabilization organizations and strengthening civilian capabilities across the globe. The memorandum is slated for review in 2013.

==== Interagency Management System ====
In order to coordinate more fully with interagency participants Ambassador Herbst developed the Interagency Management System. In testimony on Irregular Warfare and Stability Operations: Approaches to Interagency Integration given before the Oversight and Investigations Subcommittee meeting jointly with Terrorism and Unconventional Threats and Capabilities Subcommittee of the Committee on Armed Services, Ambassador Herbst discussed how the system has been created in response to ongoing struggles to synchronize and act in tandem with a strategic plan. Identified in National Presidential Security Directive 44 as both complex and challenging, coordinating the interagency became a hurdle that Ambassador Herbst and S/CRS had to maintain composure and patience but succeeded with in numerous countries.

Ambassador Herbst related the Interagency Management System to the Goldwater-Nichols Act, saying "I think that the Interagency Management System under National Security Presidential Directive 44 is roughly analogous to Goldwater-Nichols. This National Security Presidential Directive and our agreement as we implement it have established interagency coordination which did not exist in the past." In the short term Ambassador Herbst saw the Interagency Management System as a way to immediately meet challenges faced in Iraq by coordinating with the military in a way that engaged civilians and the interagency. He articulated the results of future engagements in Afghanistan and foresaw a way to avoid duplicate efforts and reach unity of effort between command structures.

==== Afghanistan ====
In Afghanistan, Ambassador Herbst led the Civilian Response Corps into the civilian surge, providing whole-of-government expertise and building Afghan capacity at provincial and command levels. His team improved cooperation between military and civilian counterparts starting with a civilian-military group in Kabul, managed the plans integrating American efforts in Afghanistan, and authored the civilian-military operational framework for the twelve U.S.-led Provincial Reconstruction Teams.

=== U.S. Ambassador to Uzbekistan ===
Ambassador Herbst was nominated by President Bill Clinton in February to be the U.S. Ambassador to Uzbekistan. The Senate confirmed his nomination on September 8. Ambassador Herbst arrived in Tashkent on October 28, 2000, and presented his credentials to Uzbek president Islam Karimov on November 1, 2000. Ambassador Herbst, serving as U.S. Ambassador to Uzbekistan during the early stages of Operation Enduring Freedom, helped arrange base access in the buildup stages.

In the aftermath of 9/11, Uzbekistan became an area of heightened importance to the US, owing to its border with Afghanistan, and a strategic ally in the war on terror. One important feature of this during his tenure was the leasing of the Karshi-Khanabad airbase to support missions against al-Qaeda. His British counterpart from 2002 was Craig Murray, who writes about their encounters in his 2006 memoir Murder in Samarkand: A British Ambassador's Controversial Defiance of Tyranny in the War on Terror (US: Dirty Diplomacy).

Ambassador Herbst represented U.S. assistance to the Government of Uzbekistan and facilitated a number of changes in the country, including granting the International Committee of the Red Cross access to the prisons in Uzbekistan. Ambassador Herbst facilitated the creation of a non-governmental organization focused on human rights in the country. Ambassador Herbst was involved in justice reform and during his tenure the judicial process was applied to two security personnel who abused their authority while working at a prison in Uzbekistan.

=== U.S. Ambassador to Ukraine ===
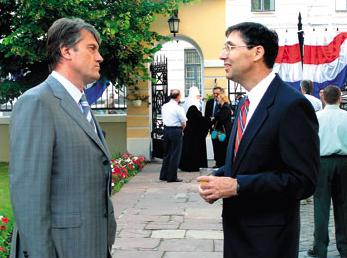
Ambassador John E. Herbst meets with Viktor Yushchenko at a U.S. Independence Day event.

During the period that became known as the Orange Revolution in Ukraine, Ambassador Herbst was involved in the events which led up to and defined Viktor Yushchenko's presidency. Ambassador Herbst was described by Pakistan's Daily Times as "an erudite, charming and linguistically gifted diplomat" whose accomplishments "conveyed Bush policy that Ukraine should not join the Common Economic Space with Russia, Belarus and Kazakhstan because 'it is not in [its] interests to have this integration complicated'."

In 2005, Ambassador Herbst, serving as U.S. Ambassador to Ukraine, called the reputation of Mykola Bilokon, Minister of the Internal Affairs of Ukraine from 2003 to 2005, "unacceptable." Later in the month Ambassador Herbst worked with newly appointed Minister of the Internal Affairs of Ukraine, Yuri Lutsenko, to reform the ministry. The new ministry was restructured to meet the changing political and socio-economic environment in Ukraine. During the meeting Ambassador Herbst offered the support of American law enforcement officers and noted that the U.S. is willing to provide aid to the Ministry of Internal Affairs.

Following the Orange Revolution, Ambassador Herbst facilitated funding of objective sources of news in Ukraine. His efforts led to the United States Agency of International Development funding $2.4 million to be spent towards the development of mass media in the country. Ambassador Herbst implemented his strategy by focusing on readying trainers and educators in the communications discipline, including Ukraine's Center for Ukrainian Reform Education and Kyiv non-governmental organization Telekritika. Ambassador Herbst oversaw tertiary funding including the Open Media Fund, sponsored by the International Renaissance Foundation and worked with his associates at the U.S. Embassy, including press attaché Brent Byers, to allocate $750,000 in 2005. Ambassador Herbst oversaw funding in support of independent media in Ukraine. Ambassador Herbst coordinated with the European Commission to Ukraine and effectively secured an additional 3.5 million Euros between 2003 and 2005.

==== Ukrainian-American Concordia University (WIUU) ====
On June 14, 2019, Herbst was appointed as the Honorary President of the Ukrainian-American Concordia University (WIUU).

==== G-8 Global Partnership Against the Proliferation of Weapons and Materials of Mass Destruction ====
On April 23–24, 2002, Ambassador Herbst attended an international conference in Moscow to gain international support of the Global Partnership Against the Proliferation of Weapons and Materials of Mass Destruction. During the conference Ambassador Herbst delivered Ukrainian Foreign Minister Kostyantyn Gryshchenko a letter from Undersecretary of State for Arms Control and International Security John Bolton. The letter encouraged Ukraine to support the Global Partnership. The letter also discussed nonproliferation topics introduced at the 2002 G-8 Summit, a summit which led to the conference in Moscow discussing the Global Partnership.

== Personal life ==
Herbst was married to Nadezda Christoff Herbst until her death in 2014 and has five children.

Diplomatic posts
Preceded by Joseph A. Presel	United States Ambassador to Uzbekistan; 2000–2003	Succeeded by Jon Purnell
Preceded by Carlos Pascual	United States Ambassador to Ukraine; 2003–2006	Succeeded by William B. Taylor, Jr.
