= Richard Miles (diplomat) =

American diplomat (born 1937)

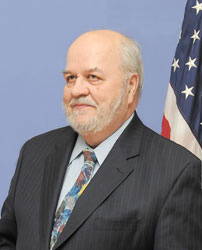

Chargé d'affaires in Kyrgyzstan
- In office February 13, 2015 – October 14, 2015
- President: Barack Obama
- Preceded by: Pamela Spratlen
- Succeeded by: Sheila Gwaltney

Chargé d'affaires in Turkmenistan
- In office 2008–2009
- President: George W. Bush; Barack Obama
- Preceded by: Richard E. Hoagland
- Succeeded by: Sylvia Reed Curran

United States Ambassador to Georgia
- In office May 13, 2002 – August 12, 2005
- President: George W. Bush
- Preceded by: Kenneth Yalowitz
- Succeeded by: John Tefft

United States Ambassador to Bulgaria
- In office September 8, 1999 – February 28, 2002
- President: Bill Clinton; George W. Bush
- Preceded by: Avis Bohlen
- Succeeded by: James Pardew

United States Ambassador to Azerbaijan
- In office September 16, 1992 – November 15, 1993
- President: George H. W. Bush; Bill Clinton
- Preceded by: Robert Finn
- Succeeded by: Richard Kauzlarich

Personal details
- Born: January 8, 1937 (age 89) Little Rock, Arkansas, U.S.
- Education: Bakersfield College; University of California, Berkeley; Indiana University, Bloomington

Richard Monroe Miles (born January 8, 1937) is an American diplomat.

== Life ==
Richard Miles was born in Little Rock, Arkansas, on January 8, 1937. He grew up in rural and small-town Indiana and attended Bloomington High School. He left high school and joined the Marine Corps in December 1954. He was in a Marine Detachment on the USS Lexington (CV-16) and a guard company at Naval Auxiliary Air Station Edenton, North Carolina. He was discharged from the Marines in December 1957.

He then obtained degrees from Bakersfield Junior College, the University of California at Berkeley and Indiana University Bloomington. He is also a graduate of the U.S. Army Russian Institute, Garmisch-Partenkirchen, Germany.

Miles worked for the South Carolina Voter Education Project from 1964 to 1967 in the field of voter registration and political leadership training.

== Foreign service career ==
He entered the Foreign Service in 1967 and served abroad in Oslo, Belgrade, Moscow, and as Consul General in Leningrad (now Saint Petersburg), and as Principal Officer of the U.S. Embassy Office in Berlin.

Miles served as Ambassador to Azerbaijan from 1992 to 1993, as Chief of Mission to Serbia-Montenegro from 1996 to 1999, as Ambassador to Bulgaria from 1999 to 2002 and as Ambassador to Georgia from 2002 to 2005.

In the State Department, he also worked in the Office for Soviet Affairs and the Office for East European and Yugoslav Affairs and in the Bureau of Political-Military Affairs.

Ambassador Miles worked for Senator Ernest F. Hollings (D-SC) on an American Political Science Fellowship in 1983–1984, and in 1987–1988 he was a fellow at Harvard University's Center for International Affairs.

Miles retired from the State Department in August 2005. From April 2006 until December 2006, he served as Executive Director of the Open World Leadership Center headquartered in the Library of Congress. In November 2008, Ambassador Miles was recalled to active duty to serve as Charge of the American Embassy in Ashgabat, Turkmenistan. He returned to Washington, DC, and retirement in September 2009. In February 2015, he was asked to go to Bishkek, Kyrgyzstan to serve as Charge of the American Embassy there. He returned to Washington and retirement in September 2015.

Miles has been awarded the State Department's Meritorious Honor Award and Group Superior Honor Award (twice). In 1992, he was awarded a Presidential Meritorious Service Award and a national award for reporting. In 2004, he was the recipient of the State Department's Robert C. Frasure Award for peaceful conflict resolution.

Diplomatic posts
Preceded by Robert Finn	United States Ambassador to Azerbaijan; 1992–1993	Succeeded by Richard Kauzlarich
Preceded by Avis Bohlen	United States Ambassador to Bulgaria; 1999–2002	Succeeded by James Pardew
Preceded by Kenneth Spencer Yalowitz	United States Ambassador to Georgia; 2002–2005	Succeeded by John Tefft
Preceded by Pamela Spratlen	United States Ambassador to Kyrgyzstan; Acting; 2015	Succeeded by Sheila Gwaltney
