= William B. Taylor Jr. =

American diplomat (born 1947)

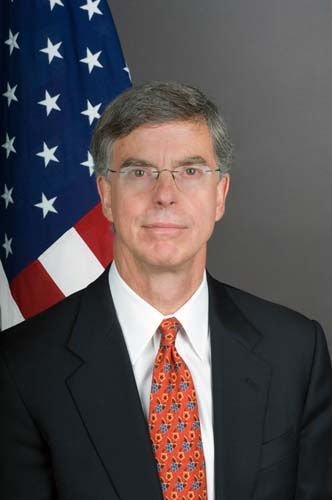

United States Chargé d’Affaires to Ukraine
- In office June 18, 2019 – January 1, 2020
- President: Donald Trump
- Preceded by: Kristina Kvien (acting)
- Succeeded by: Kristina Kvien (acting)

United States Ambassador to Ukraine
- In office June 21, 2006 – May 23, 2009
- President: George W. Bush; Barack Obama
- Preceded by: John E. Herbst
- Succeeded by: John F. Tefft

Personal details
- Born: William Brockenbrough Taylor Jr. September 14, 1947 (age 79) New Mexico, U.S.
- Spouse: Deborah Furlan
- Children: 2
- Education: United States Military Academy (BS); Harvard University (MPP)

Military service
- Allegiance: United States
- Branch/service: United States Army
- Years of service: 1969–1975
- Rank: Captain
- Unit: 101st Airborne Division
- Battles/wars: Vietnam War
- Awards: Bronze Star Medal; Air Medal

William Brockenbrough Taylor Jr. (born September 14, 1947) is an American diplomat, government official, and former military officer. He served as the 6th United States ambassador to Ukraine from 2006 to 2009 under presidents George W. Bush and Barack Obama, and as chargé d’affaires to Ukraine from June 2019 to January 2020 under President Donald Trump.

Taylor is a former captain and company commander in the United States Army; he served in the Vietnam War and earned a Bronze Star and an Air Medal with a V device for valor. He proceeded to work in the United States Department of Energy and then the Department of Defense. From 1992 to 2002, Taylor served as a U.S. diplomat in Eastern Europe and the former Soviet Union, Afghanistan, Iraq, and at the Quartet on the Middle East. From 2006 to 2009, Taylor served as the United States ambassador to Ukraine under the Bush and Obama administrations. He continued his diplomatic work in the Middle East from 2011 to 2013.

Following the recall of U.S. Ambassador to Ukraine Marie Yovanovitch in mid-2019, Taylor was appointed chargé d'affaires for Ukraine under the Trump administration. Upon the expiration of his temporary appointment, he left in early January 2020.

== Early life ==
Born in New Mexico on September 14, 1947, Taylor is the son of Nancy Dare (Aitcheson) and William Brockenbrough Newton Taylor, who had been a director of research and development for the United States Army Corps of Engineers (USACE).

Taylor attended Mount Vernon High School in Mount Vernon, Virginia where he graduated in 1965 and served as president of his junior and senior class. Like his father, he attended the United States Military Academy at West Point, New York, attaining the rank of cadet battalion commander and graduating in the top 1% of his class in 1969. The 1969 Howitzer yearbook notes his modesty about his many academic and athletic accomplishments, describing him as "a man who is held in the highest esteem and admiration by all of us." In 1977, he completed graduate studies at Harvard University's John F. Kennedy School of Government, receiving a Master of Public Policy (MPP) degree.

== Career ==
After Taylor graduated from West Point, he served in the infantry for six years, including tours of duty in the 82nd Airborne Division at Fort Bragg, and 18 months with the 101st Airborne Division during the Vietnam War. Taylor was a rifle company commander serving in the Quang Tri and Thua Tien provinces in the 506th Infantry Regiment (United States) of the 101st Airborne, widely heralded from the World War II book and TV miniseries Band of Brothers, with their motto "Currahee," meaning "We stand alone." He was eligible to return home after serving for one year, but he opted to stay another six months. He earned the Combat Infantryman Badge, a Bronze Star Medal, and Air Medal with 'V' for VALOR for heroism.

Later, he was an aero-rifle commander in the 2nd Cavalry Regiment (United States) in Germany.

Taylor left the military in 1975. In 1980, he was serving in the relatively new Department of Energy as Director of Emergency Preparedness Policy. While the DOE had received creditable marks for its response to the coal strike during 1977–78, the crisis in Iran pointed to the need, going forward, for better federal level contingency planning and preparedness. In taking on this new assignment, Taylor had a long term, rather than short term, focus on potential crises (e.g. price controls and gasoline rationing), efforts that often required coordination with other federal agencies, including the Department of the Treasury, the Office of Management and Budget, the Council of Economic Advisers and the Department of Health and Human Services.

Thereafter, Taylor served for five years as Legislative Assistant on the staff of U.S. Senator Bill Bradley (D-N.J.). He then directed a Defense Department think tank at Fort Lesley J. McNair.

Following that assignment, he transferred to Brussels for a five-year assignment as the Special Deputy Defense Advisor to the U.S. Ambassador to NATO, William Howard Taft IV. From 1992 until 2002, Taylor served with the rank of ambassador, coordinating assistance to Eastern Europe and the former Soviet Union. He then accepted an assignment as Special Representative for Donor Assistance in Kabul, coordinating U.S. and international assistance to Afghanistan. Engaging with the Afghan government and international donors, Taylor facilitated the flow of assistance to Afghanistan and promoted additional donations. The undertaking facilitated the repatriation of 2 million Afghan refugees and the restoration of critical services such as education and health care. The aid helped restore agriculture, and provided support grants for over 80 infrastructure projects. In 2003, Secretary of State Colin Powell appointed Taylor as the Afghanistan Coordinator at the U.S. Department of State, overseeing all aspects of U.S. policy toward Afghanistan, noting that it was a critical time in Afghanistan's political development and economic reconstruction.

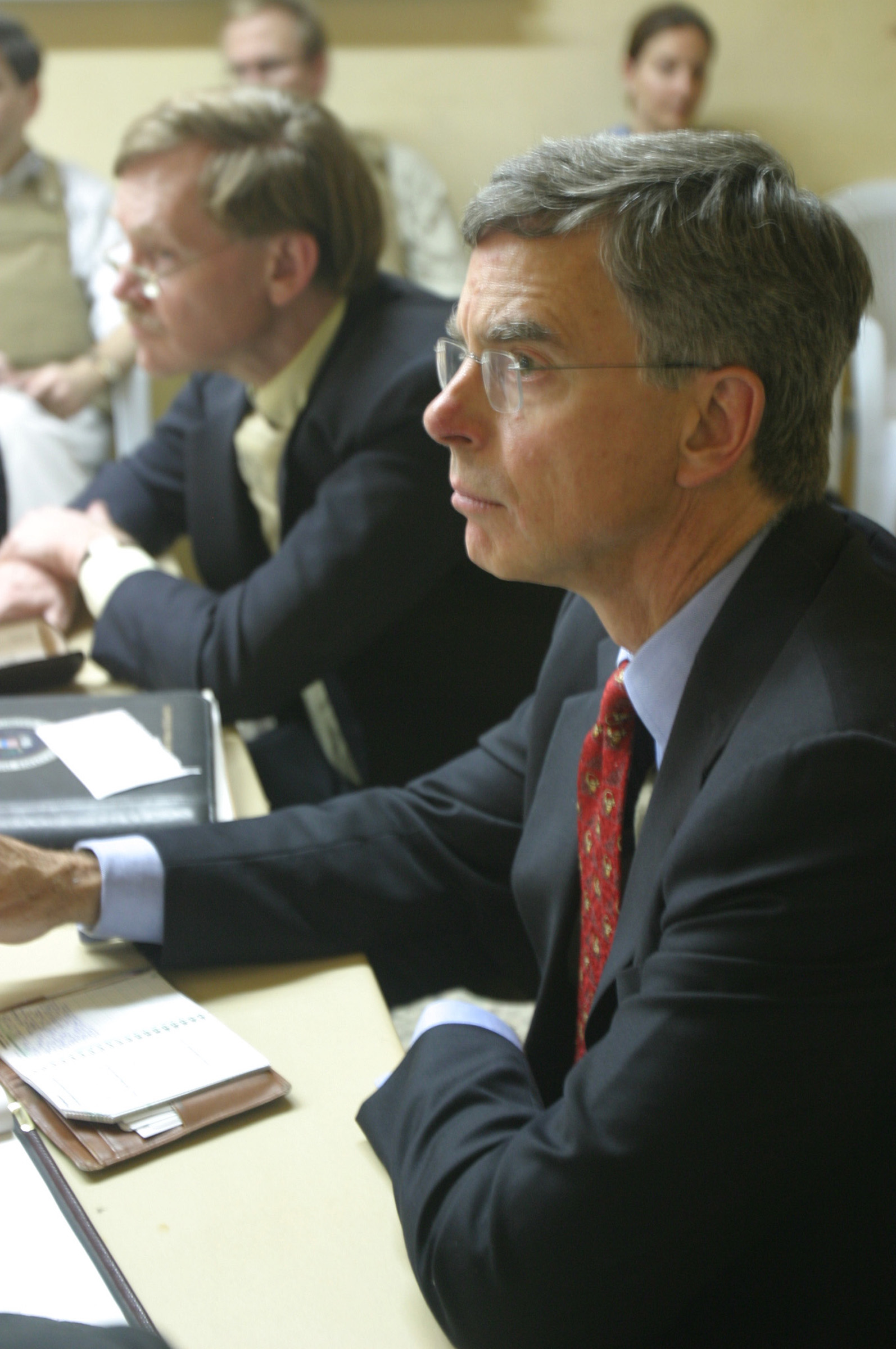
Taylor met with the interim Fallujah city council, April 2005

In 2004, Taylor was transferred to Baghdad as Director of the Iraq Reconstruction Management Office.

Until 2006, he was the U.S. Government's representative to the Quartet's effort to facilitate the Israeli disengagement from Gaza and parts of the West Bank, led by Special Envoy James Wolfensohn in Jerusalem. The Quartet Special Envoy was responsible for the economic aspects of this disengagement.

Taylor was nominated by President George W. Bush to be the United States ambassador to Ukraine while Taylor was serving as Senior Consultant to the Coordinator of Reconstruction and Stabilization at the Department of State. He was confirmed by the U.S. Senate on May 26, 2006, and was sworn in on June 5, 2006. At the time Taylor assumed responsibilities at the embassy, it was the fifth-largest bilateral mission in Europe, with over 650 employees from nine U.S. government departments and agencies. A report by the Office of the Inspector General of the Department of State from 2007 notes that the new ambassador had "taken charge of the embassy in a remarkably effective and positive way," creating, together with Deputy Chief of Mission Sheila Gwaltney, a "formidable team at a mission that has a complex set of goals." It further noted that "Embassy Kyiv has a keen understanding of the complicated and rapidly evolving political and economic situation in Ukraine and has good working relations across the political spectrum. The embassy's commentary on such issues as the evolving state of Ukraine's relations with the European Union, North Atlantic Treaty Organization (NATO), and Russia is extensive, timely, and well appreciated by Washington end-users." Taylor held the post until May 2009.

On September 30, 2009, U.S. President Barack Obama nominated John Tefft as U.S. ambassador to Ukraine. Taylor was appointed Special Coordinator for Middle East Transitions in September 2011. From then through 2013, Taylor's mission was to ensure effective U.S. support for the countries of the Arab revolutions, coordinating assistance to Egypt, Tunisia, Libya and Syria.

In 2015, Taylor was appointed executive vice president of the United States Institute of Peace, after serving a year in the same role in an acting capacity. In this role, he supported continuing or increasing U.S. sanctions against Russia for its aggressions toward Ukraine.

Taylor became chargé d'affaires ad interim for Ukraine in June 2019, taking over the role from the deputy chief of mission, Kristina Kvien, after Marie Yovanovitch departed Ukraine. In December, Ulrich Brechbuhl, a top aide to Secretary of State Mike Pompeo, informed Taylor that he should return to the U.S. in early January 2020 before a scheduled trip by Pompeo to Ukraine. The federal Vacancies Act would have allowed him to keep his position in Ukraine until January 8 and would allow him to serve in other roles with the State Department.

Taylor departed Ukraine on January 2, 2020, after stepping down from his post.

== Trump–Ukraine scandal ==
=== Taylor–Sondland texts ===
Taylor arrived in Ukraine a month after the abrupt ousting of Ambassador Marie Yovanovitch and the inauguration of the country's new president, Volodymyr Zelenskyy. But following President Donald Trump's phone call with the new Ukrainian president, Taylor questioned Trump's motivation in a text to Gordon Sondland, the United States Ambassador to the European Union: "Are we now saying that security assistance and WH meeting are conditioned on investigations?" Sondland told him to phone.

On October 3, 2019, it was revealed that Taylor had expressed, in text messages, concern that President Trump may have withheld aid to Ukraine unless they, Ukraine, launched two investigations, one into alleged corruption in Ukraine involving former Vice President Joe Biden, and the other an attempt to deflect from the US intelligence communities' consensus determination that Russia hacked the Democratic National Committee and interfered with the 2016 United States presidential election, by suggesting that the DNC is hiding the hacked server in Ukraine.

Explicit throughout Taylor's testimony was that Trump's goal in withholding the congressionally mandated military aid to Ukraine was to extort Zelenskyy, the newly inaugurated president of Ukraine, into announcing an investigation into the theory related to Biden in a primetime American television interview. At the time, and through much of the preceding nascent Democratic Party Presidential Primary Election season, Biden was the leading candidate, and seemed likely to be the Democratic Party challenger to Trump in the 2020 presidential election. Additional incentive was provided for Ukraine to do as Trump, Sondland, and Trump's personal attorney, Rudy Giuliani, suggested, by implying that Zelenskyy would get a state visit to the White House if he complied.

According to transcripts released by the House impeachment probe, Taylor on September 9, 2019, at 12:47:11 am texted, "I think it's crazy to withhold security assistance for help with a political campaign." Over four hours later, at 5:19:35 am, in his response to Taylor, Sondland responded that the charge is "incorrect." "Bill, I believe you are incorrect about President Trump's intentions. The President has been crystal clear: no quid pro quo's of any kind. The President is trying to evaluate whether Ukraine is truly going to adopt the transparency and reforms that President Zelensky promised during his campaign." He then suggested Taylor call the Executive Secretary of the United States Department of State about any concerns: "I suggest we stop the back and forth by text If you still have concerns I recommend you give Lisa Kenna or S a call to discuss them directly. Thanks." In his testimony during the impeachment inquiry Sondland noted that it was only out of his deep respect for Taylor that he tried to address Taylor's concerns. On October 22, 2019, Taylor's opening statement also explained that Sondland required that Zelenskyy make public statements announcing an investigation, forcing him to conduct one, before the US released the allocated military aid. Taylor said he feared that Trump would withhold the military aid anyway, handing Moscow everything it wanted from the betrayal, texting Sondland that his "nightmare is that they [the Ukrainians] give the interview and don't get the security assistance. The Russians love it. (And I quit.)"

Taylor gave a deposition before a closed-door session of the House Intelligence Committee on October 22, 2019.

=== Testimony in House impeachment inquiry ===
External videos
- Testimony of Taylor and Deputy Assistant Secretary of State George Kent before the House Intelligence Committee, November 13, 2019, C-SPAN

Opening statement of Ambassador William B. Taylor

On October 22, 2019, Taylor testified before the US Congressional House regarding the impeachment inquiry against Donald Trump and the Trump–Ukraine scandal in a closed session. Taylor's opening statement was made public and directly implicated President Trump in a proactive and coordinated effort to solicit a political quid pro quo whereby "everything" – from a one-on-one meeting with President Trump to hundreds of millions of dollars in congressionally approved military aid to Ukraine – would be held up unless Ukrainian President Zelenskyy agreed to announce publicly that "investigations" would be launched including into former VP Joe Biden, his son Hunter Biden, Ukrainian energy company Burisma, and Ukraine's alleged involvement in the 2016 election. Taylor's opening statement and testimony was widely viewed as an inflection point in the impeachment inquiry.

A few days before his second House testimony in mid-November, Taylor published an op-ed in Kyiv's Novoye Vremya expressing the United States government's commitment to Ukraine: "your success is our success."

=== Post-impeachment commentary ===
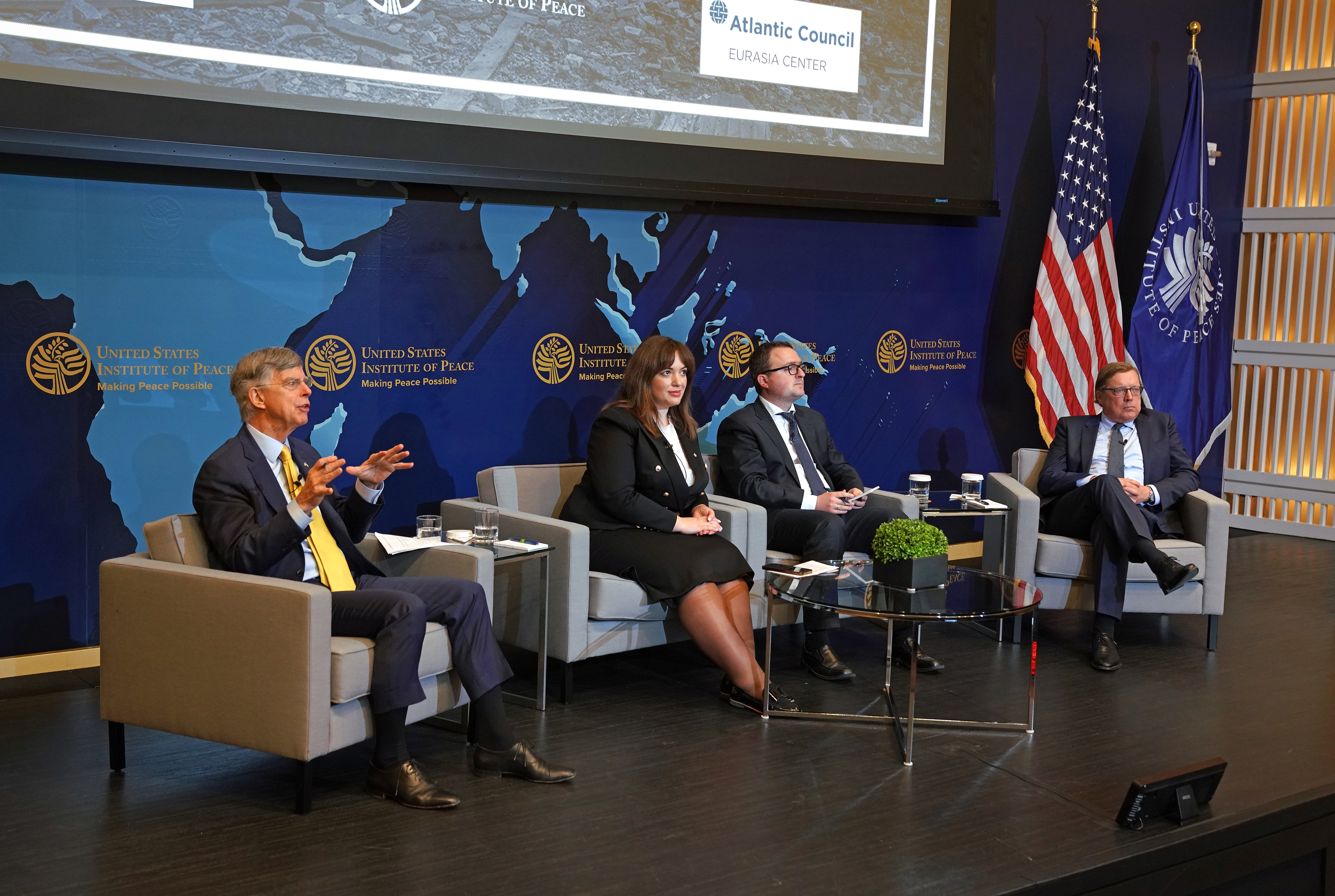
December 2022 William B. Taylor Jr., Lesya Zaburanna, Anton Korynevych and war crimes expert David Scheffer at a meeting about Prosecuting the Crime of Aggression in Ukraine in 2022

In an interview with CBS's 60 Minutes, Taylor said that no officials at the State Department believed Trump's theory that Ukraine had interfered in the 2016 election to damage Trump. Yet Giuliani continued to try to gather damaging info on Trump's Democratic opponents. Taylor noted: "Ukraine's security is important to our security and the reason I believe that is that Ukraine is on the front line," noting also that Russia is waging "a hybrid war against Ukraine, but it's not just about Ukraine, they are fighting a hybrid war against Europe and against the United States."

Taylor insists that the US has a vested interest in the conflict, which stretches far past the eastern Ukraine battle zone. "Hybrid war is more than tanks and soldiers," Taylor noted. "Hybrid war is information war, it's cyber war, it's economic war, it's attacks on elections and as we know they have attacked our elections."

== Personal life ==
Taylor is married to Deborah Furlan Taylor, a religion scholar. They have two children and four grandchildren.

Diplomatic posts
Preceded by John E. Herbst	United States Ambassador to Ukraine; 2006–2009	Succeeded by John F. Tefft
Preceded by Kristina Kvien; Acting	United States Ambassador to Ukraine; Acting; 2019–2020	Succeeded by Kristina Kvien; Acting
