= Civilian Response Corps =

U.S. government program

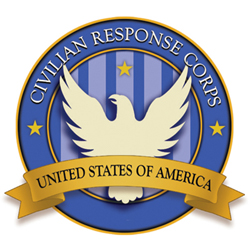
- Established: October 2008
- Coordinator: Robert Geers Loftis

The Civilian Response Corps (sometimes referred to as CRC) is a program of the United States Department of State, Office of the Coordinator for Reconstruction and Stabilization (S/CRS). The Civilian Response Corps is a group of federal employees and volunteers from the private sector, state and local governments who are trained to deploy rapidly in countries that are in crisis or emerging from conflict in order to provide reconstruction and stabilization assistance.

The assistance was partly humanitarian, and partly to prevent failed states from becoming "havens" for terrorist groups or otherwise the possibility of a threat to the security of the United States. It was originally proposed by Senators Richard Lugar (R-Ind.) and Joseph Biden (D-Del.). The President has empowered the Secretary of State to coordinate and lead integrated U.S. government efforts to prepare, plan for, and conduct stabilization and reconstruction activities and to coordinate with the Secretary of Defense to harmonize civilian and military activities.

As of 2017, or possibly earlier, the United States no longer has a Civilian Response Corp.

== Funding and size ==
=== Civilian Stabilization Initiative ===
The Civilian Stabilization Initiative (CSI) has been used in multiple countries since forming, including Afghanistan, Iraq, Haiti, Sudan, Kosovo, and Somalia. CSI was an answer for Congress' call for the U.S. government to build its civilian capacity.

=== 1207 funding ===
Section 1207 of the FY 2006 National Defense Authorization Act authorized the United States Secretary of Defense to transfer up to $100 million per year for two years to the Department of State. In passing Section 1207, the United States Congress wrote about the need for a civilian response capability for stabilization and reconstruction activities in countries that are prone to conflict. After funding $110 million in projects in FY06 and FY07, Section 1207 was renewed for an additional $100 million in 2008.

For the FY 06 and FY 07 1207 projects, $10 million were given to support training for Lebanese Internal Security Forces and to assist Lebanese Armed Forces with recovering unexploded ordnance;Colombia's Initial Governance Response Plan received $4 million; $20 million are sent to the Haiti Stability Initiative; $10 million to Nepal; $25 million to Somalia, Ethiopia, and Kenya; $15 million to Trans-Saharan Counterterrorism Initiative Mali, Mauritania, and Niger; $16.9 million to Tri-Border Initiative Indonesia, Malaysia, and Philippines; and Yemen were given $8.8 million.

==== 2008 ====
In the Supplemental Appropriations Act of 2008, the United States Congress provided up to $75 million in initial funding for the active and standby components of the Civilian Response Corps.

==== 2009 ====
President George W. Bush requested $248.6 million in Fiscal Year 2009 budget for the CSI, which includes the Civilian Response Corps. The intent of CSI was to:

- Create 250 full-time positions for members of the Civilian Response Corps Active across the eight participating U.S. departments and agencies. These "first responders" can deploy to a crisis with as little as 48 hours notice.
- Train 2,000 members of the Civilian Response Corps Standby in the same eight departments and agencies. These are current federal employees who volunteer to undertake additional training and to be available to serve in stabilization missions in case of need. Standby members are deployable within 30 days for up to 180 days.
- Recruit and train 2,000 members of the Civilian Response Corps Reserve.

==== 2010 ====
President Barack Obama's fiscal year 2010 budget, released on May 7, 2009, requested $323.3 million for the CSI to build U.S. civilian capacity for reconstruction and stabilization efforts.

== Civil-military ==
The 2009 Capstone Concept for Joint Operations (CCJO) listed 'relief and reconstruction' as one of the four basic military activities. To coordinate reconstruction efforts between the military and civilian elements, the President signed into law National Security Presidential Directive 44 on December 7, 2005.

In National Security Presidential Directive – 44 (NSPD-44), the president stated the need to create a cohesive and permanent mechanism for the US government to address stabilization and reconstruction issues abroad. The Civilian Response Corps was created as a civilian interagency mechanism that would interface with the military to stabilize war-torn countries.

== Pilot program ==
The U.S. Department of State's Office of the Coordinator for Reconstruction and Stabilization (S/CRS) coordinates the Civilian Response Corps and has developed pilot groups of active and standby members who have deployed to Sudan, Chad, Haiti, Lebanon, Kosovo, Iraq, and Afghanistan. The State Department coordinates with the Secretary of Defense.
