= List of ambassadors of the United States to Uzbekistan =

Ambassador of the United States to Uzbekistan
- Seal of the United States Department of State

- Flag of a United States ambassador

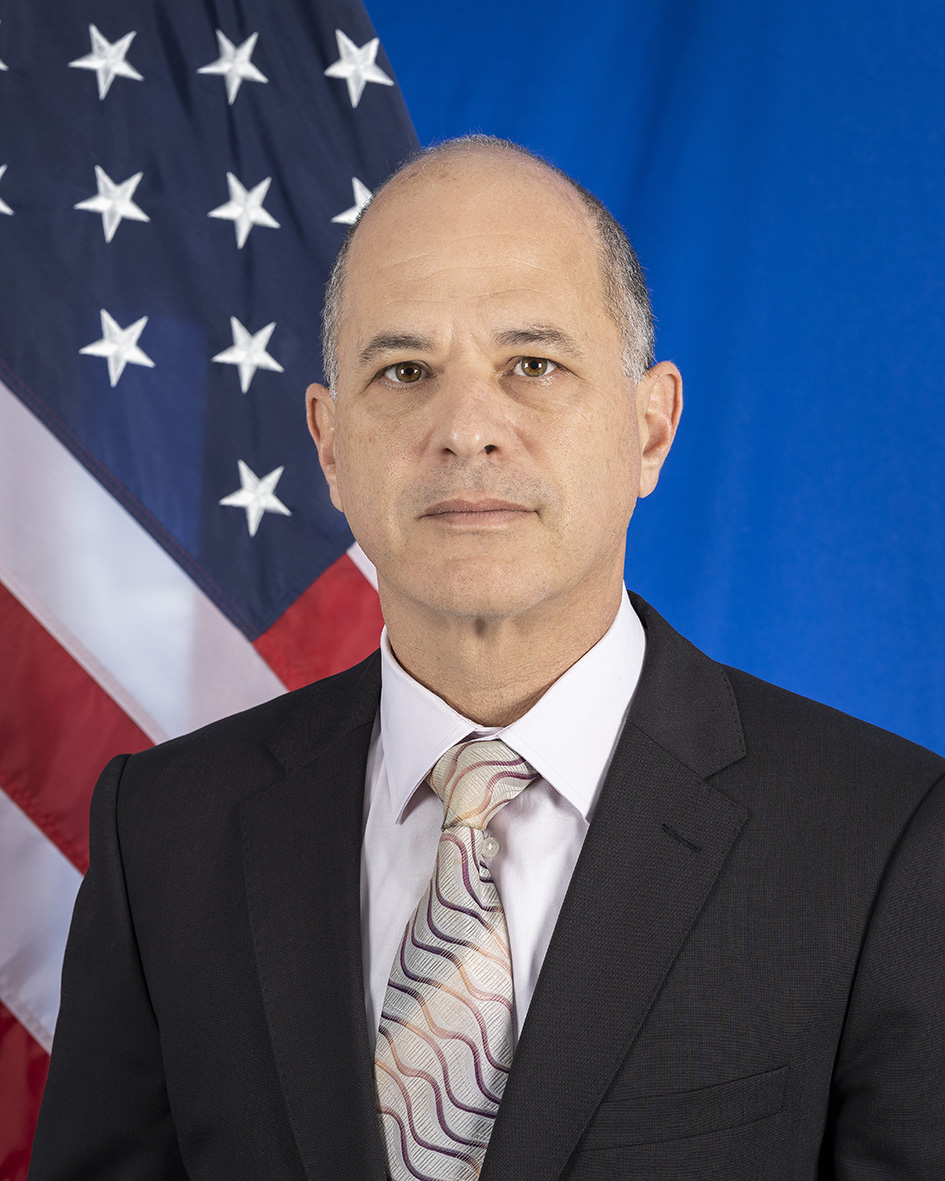
- Incumbent; Jonathan Henick since November 24, 2022
- Nominator: The president of the United States
- Inaugural holder: Michael Mozur as Chargé d'Affaires ad interim
- Formation: March 16, 1992
- Website: U.S. Embassy - Tashkent

This is a list of United States ambassadors to Uzbekistan.

The United States recognized Uzbekistan on December 25, 1991, and established diplomatic relations on February 19, 1992.

The embassy was opened by interim ambassador Michael Mozur on March 16, 1992.

Representative	From	To	Title	Appointed by
Michael Mozur	March 16, 1992	April 27, 1992	Chargé d'Affaires ad interim	George H. W. Bush
Henry Lee Clarke	September 9, 1992	September 30, 1995	Ambassador	George H. W. Bush
Stanley T. Escudero	October 12, 1995	October 3, 1997	Ambassador	Bill Clinton
Joseph A. Presel	December 3, 1997	October 23, 2000	Ambassador	Bill Clinton
John Edward Herbst	November 1, 2000	July 12, 2003	Ambassador	Bill Clinton
Jon Purnell	January 28, 2004	April 28, 2007	Ambassador	George W. Bush
Richard Norland	September 20, 2007	July 24, 2010	Ambassador	George W. Bush
George A. Krol	July 5, 2011	December 8, 2014	Ambassador	Barack Obama
Pamela L. Spratlen	January 27, 2015	October 4, 2018	Ambassador	Barack Obama
Daniel N. Rosenblum	May 24, 2019	August 30, 2022	Ambassador	Donald Trump
Jonathan Henick	November 24, 2022	Incumbent	Ambassador	Joe Biden

== See also ==
- Embassy of Uzbekistan, Washington, D.C.
- United States – Uzbekistan relations
- Foreign relations of Uzbekistan
- Ambassadors of the United States
