= Jon Purnell =

Former American Ambassador to Uzbekistan

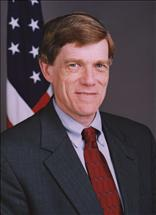

United States Ambassador to Uzbekistan
- In office December 18, 2003 – April 08, 2007
- President: George W. Bush
- Preceded by: John Edward Herbst
- Succeeded by: Richard Norland

Personal details
- Born: 1948 (age 77–78)
- Children: 5
- Education: Harvard University, Brown University, Norwood High School
- Profession: Career Foreign Service Officer

Jon Robert Purnell (born 1948) is a former United States Ambassador to Uzbekistan.

== Personal life ==
Purnell grew up in Norwood, Massachusetts and graduated Norwood High School in 1966. Afterwards, he attended Brown University and earned a bachelor's degree in European History in 1970, followed by a master's degree in Soviet Studies from Harvard University in 1973.

== Foreign Service career ==
He worked in Monrovia, Liberia from 1980 to 1981 and in Vienna, Austria from 1988 to 1989 as a member of the U.S. conventional arms control delegation.

Purnell's assignments in Washington have focused on Russia and Ukraine. He first worked in Moscow from 1982–1984. He worked as special assistant to Ambassador Jack F. Matlock, Jr. on the National Security Council in 1986.

From 1989–1992 he served as Deputy Principal Officer at the U.S. Consulate General at St. Petersburg, Russia.

From 1993–1996, he was the Director of the State Department's Office of Ukraine, Belarus and Moldova.

Purnell’s overseas postings have included Almaty, Kazakhstan, where he was Deputy Chief of Mission from 1997–2000. He served as Deputy to the Secretary’s Acting Special Adviser for the Newly Independent States.

Between 2001–2002, he served as a Senior Inspector in the State Department’s Office of the Inspector General. He was Minister Counselor for Political Affairs at the U.S. Embassy in Moscow.

Jon Purnell presented his credentials as U.S. Ambassador to the Republic of Uzbekistan on January 28, 2004. In the aftermath of 9/11, Uzbekistan had become an area of heightened importance to the US, owing to its border with Afghanistan, and a strategic ally in the war on terror. His British counterpart, who had been there more than a year before him, was Craig Murray, who writes about their encounters in his memoir Murder in Samarkand: A British Ambassador's Controversial Defiance of Tyranny in the War on Terror (2006). One of the most serious events that Purnell had to deal with was the May 2005 Andijan massacre, in which the Uzbek government killed hundreds, possibly thousands, of civilians. Calls from Western governments, including the US, for an international investigation prompted a major shift in Uzbek foreign policy favoring closer relations with Asian nations instead of with the West. In July of that year, the Uzbek government ordered the closing of the United States air base in Karshi-Khanabad, which was accomplished by November.

Purnell departed post April 28, 2007.

Purnell has received the Department of State’s Superior Honor Award and Meritorious Honor Award.

Diplomatic posts
Preceded by John Edward Herbst	United States Ambassador to Uzbekistan; 2004–2007	Succeeded by Richard Norland
