= Kathryne Bomberger =

American ICMP director

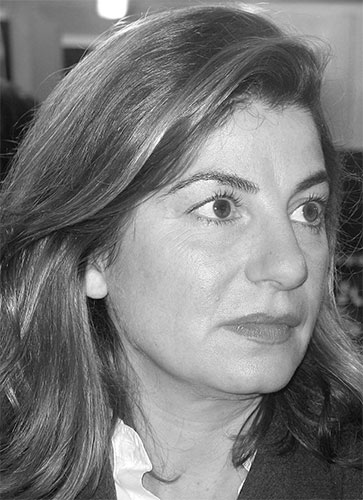
- Education: BA, Georgetown University; MA, George Washington University
- Occupation: ICMP Director General
- Spouse: Adam Micheal Bacher Boys OBE
- Parent(s): Richard Bomberger (father), Franciska Bomberger, (mother), Dorothy Bomberger (step-mother)

Kathryne Csekey Bomberger has worked in the field of international relations, human rights, politics and conflict prevention since 1995. She is currently director-general of the International Commission on Missing Persons (ICMP).

== Education ==
Bomberger has an undergraduate degree in history from Georgetown University, and a graduate degree in international relations, with a focus on Middle East studies, from the Elliott School of International Affairs at the George Washington University in Washington, D.C.

== Career ==
She was appointed ICMP Director-General in 2004, having led the development of the organization since 1998. Since its creation in 1996, ICMP has been transformed from an ad hoc mechanism tasked with assisting countries emerging from the conflicts in the former Yugoslavia to a treaty-based international organization with global reach. Kathryne Bomberger has consistently sought to ensure that the global challenge of missing persons is addressed by governments as an urgent priority, in a manner that is modern, effective and based on the rule of law.

Bomberger has worked in conflict and post-conflict areas as well as in areas affected by disasters and by organized crime (including the Western Balkans, Cyprus, Armenia, Iraq, Libya, Lebanon, Ukraine, Mexico, Colombia, Haiti, and the Philippines), helping governments, courts, prosecutors, NGOs, scientists, academics and others to build capacity to address the cross-cutting issue of missing persons, including through the development of effective institutions and legislation. She has spoken on the issue of missing persons at countless public forums, including the United Nations and the US Congress, and she has been interviewed by the BBC, The Guardian, The New York Times, the Financial Times, The Economist and many other media outlets, as well as participating in TV and film documentaries. Her numerous awards include recognition by the president of France as a Chevalier de la Légion d'honneur.
