= George A. Krol =

American diplomat (born 1956)

George Krol
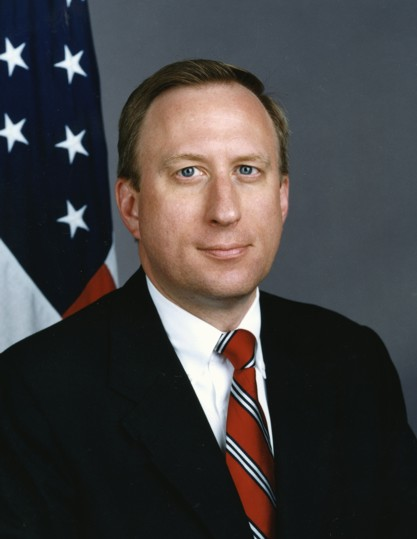

United States Ambassador to Kazakhstan
- In office March 18, 2015 – September 17, 2018
- President: Barack Obama; Donald Trump
- Preceded by: John Ordway
- Succeeded by: William H. Moser

United States Ambassador to Uzbekistan
- In office July 5, 2011 – December 8, 2014
- President: Barack Obama
- Preceded by: Richard Norland
- Succeeded by: Pamela Spratlen

United States Ambassador to Belarus
- In office October 22, 2003 – July 24, 2006
- President: George W. Bush
- Preceded by: Michael Kozak
- Succeeded by: Karen Stewart

Personal details
- Born: 1956 (age 69–70) Pittsburgh, Pennsylvania, U.S.
- Education: Harvard University; Mansfield College, Oxford

George Albert Krol (born 1956) is a United States foreign service officer and career member of the Senior Foreign Service with the rank of Minister-Counselor. Krol formerly served as United States Ambassador to Kazakhstan. A position he was sworn in to on January 8, 2015.

== Personal life ==
Krol's home state is New Jersey. He is the youngest of three sons of Anthony J. Krol of Manchester Township, New Jersey.

He attended St. Peter's Preparatory School in Jersey City, New Jersey, and received a bachelor's degree in history, magna cum laude, from Harvard University, and bachelor's and master's degrees in philosophy, politics and economics from Oxford University, England.

Krol is married to Melissa Welch.

== Career ==
Krol joined the United States Foreign Service in 1982, and is a career member of the Senior Foreign Service. He held foreign assignments in Poland, India, the Soviet Union, Russia, Ukraine and in Belarus. He served as Minister-Counselor for Political Affairs at the United States Embassy in Moscow (1999–2002) and He served as Deputy Chief of Mission and Chargé d'affaires in Minsk, Belarus (1993–1995). His Washington assignments include Deputy Assistant Secretary for the Bureau of South and Central Asian Affairs, Director of the Office of Russian Affairs (1997–1999) and Special Assistant to the Ambassador-at-Large for the New Independent States (1995–1997). Krol taught at the National War College and was a member of the State Department's Senior Seminar. He received several State Department Superior and Meritorious Honor awards. He speaks Russian and Polish.

He served as the U.S. Ambassador to Uzbekistan 2011-2014 and as the Ambassador to Belarus 2003–2006.

Ambassador Krol served as United States Ambassador to Kazakhstan from 2015 to 2018. He was awarded the Order of Dostyk (the Order of Friendship) by the President of Kazakhstan, Nursultan Nazarbayev, in September 2018 and the Belarusian Democratic Republic 100th Jubilee Medal in 2019.

Diplomatic posts
Preceded by Michael Kozak	United States Ambassador to Belarus; 2003–2006	Succeeded by Karen Stewart
Preceded by Richard Norland	United States Ambassador to Uzbekistan; 2011–2014	Succeeded by Pamela Spratlen
Preceded by John Ordway	United States Ambassador to Kazakhstan; 2015–2018	Succeeded by William H. Moser
