= Franklin Huddle =

American diplomat

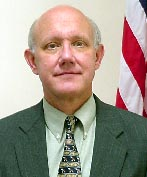

United States Ambassador to Tajikistan
- In office October 26, 2001 – October 9, 2003
- President: George W. Bush
- Preceded by: Robert Finn
- Succeeded by: Richard E. Hoagland

Personal details
- Born: May 9, 1943 (age 83) California, U.S.
- Spouse: Chanya "Pom" Huddle
- Education: Brown University (BA); Harvard University (MA, PhD)

Franklin Pierce "Frank" Huddle Jr. (born May 9, 1943) is an American diplomat. Huddle has the nickname "Pancho."

== Early life and education ==
A native of California, Huddle received a Bachelor of Arts in linguistics from Brown University in 1965. Huddle received two degrees from Harvard University, a Master of Arts in Middle Eastern history and languages in 1970 and a Doctor of Philosophy in 1978.

== Career ==
From September 1990 to September 1994, Huddle served in Myanmar as the chargé d'affaires ad interim.

While serving as the Consul General of the United States, Mumbai, Huddle and his wife, Chanya, nicknamed "Pom", survived the crash of Ethiopian Airlines Flight 961, which was hijacked on November 23, 1996. Huddle said that he chose to fly on Ethiopian Airlines while planning a safari trip to Kenya due to its outstanding reputation and having Federal Aviation Administration certification, adding that a daytime flight was "safer". In another interview for the Mayday television series, he said when the captain announced to the cabin that it was time for passengers to don life jackets, he heard the sounds of inflation after he and his wife put theirs on; he then stood up and told the passengers in all three cabins not to inflate their jackets inside the plane. Huddle credits his and his wife's survival to a last-minute upgrade to business class.

Huddle served as United States ambassador to Tajikistan. He received an appointment on October 1, 2001, and presented his credentials on October 26, 2001. He left the Tajikistan post on October 9, 2003.

Huddle and his wife have one child.

Diplomatic posts
Preceded by Burton Levin	Chargé d'Affaires ad interim to Burma; 1990–1994	Succeeded by Marilyn Meyers
Preceded by Robert Finn	United States Ambassador to Tajikistan; 2001-2003	Succeeded by Richard E. Hoagland
