= Train-and-equip program =

A train-and-equip program is a military operation in which one country provides training and equipment to an ally. The practice typically involves the transfer of expertise and materiel from a stronger military to a weaker one, as an alternative to fighting together outright. The United States Department of Defense has run several train-and-equip programs in recent military history.

== Bosnia ==
During the Bosnian War, American president Bill Clinton and Bosnian president Alija Izetbegović agreed to a train-and-equip program for Bosnia, valued at an estimated $500 million USD. American diplomat James W. Pardew oversaw the implementation of the plan. The Bosnian Train and Equip Program was carried out in a multi-agency effort over the course of two years and led to a reduction of military tensions between warring factions in the country and removed foreign extremist influence from the political process. It was described as a success in securing the peace in Bosnia and allowing the United States and its NATO partners to reduce their exposure to the conflict.

== Georgia ==
From 2002 to 2004, the Department of Defense spent US$64 million training the Georgian Armed Forces, with the fighting in the Pankisi Gorge providing much of the initial stimulus. The British Army also helped train and equip Georgian forces. Georgia would go on to fight with the coalition forces in the Iraq War. The goal of the program was to boost the proficiency of Georgia's security forces in the areas of border security, anti-terrorism, disaster response, etc.

== Syria ==
The Syrian Train and Equip Program is an ongoing US$500 million initiative to support moderate rebels and anti-extremist elements in the Syrian Civil War. The program's training takes place in numerous neighboring countries such as Turkey, Jordan, and Qatar and has led to the creation of groups such as the New Syrian Army and Division 30.

== See also ==
- Lend-Lease
- Vietnamization
