= Thomas J. Miller (diplomat) =

American diplomat

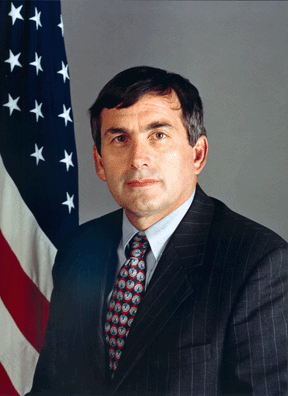
Thomas J. Miller, 2002

Thomas Joel Miller (born December 9, 1948) is an American diplomat and three-time U.S. ambassador who served from 2010 until 2018 as president/CEO of International Executive Service Corps (IESC). IESC is a 50-year-old non-profit started by David Rockefeller and other prominent American businesspeople focusing on creating prosperity and stability through private enterprise; it has worked in over 130 countries.

Born in Chicago, Illinois, Miller earned his BA in political science from the University of Michigan in 1969. He proceeded to acquire an MA in Asian studies, an MA in political science, and received his Ph.D. in political science from the University of Michigan in 1975. He was awarded an honorary doctorate from The University of Michigan in 2003, when he also was the commencement speaker. He also taught diplomacy and international relations at George Mason University.

He served in several positions worldwide since joining the United States Foreign Service in 1976, including director of the Office of Israel and Arab-Israel Affairs and director of the Office of North African Affairs as well as special assistant to the undersecretary for political affairs, chief of staff to the president's Middle East envoy, and office director in the Office of Counterterrorism. His foreign postings in his 29-year State Department career include: Thailand, Greece (three times) and Bosnia-Herzegovina.

On August 3, 2001, Miller was appointed by President George W. Bush to be ambassador to Greece. He took up the position on October 8, 2001, and held it until he left the post on December 23, 2004. He earlier was appointed by President Clinton to two Senate-confirmable positions: ambassador to Bosnia-Herzegovina (1999–2001) and special Cyprus coordinator at the rank of ambassador (1997–1999).

Miller was formerly the chief executive officer of Plan International, a $750 million United Kingdom-based NGO that works to improve the living conditions of children in over 50 developing countries. On May 11, 2009, Miller succeeded William H. Luers as president of the United Nations Association.

In May 2011, Miller was appointed by Secretary of State Clinton to be the chairman of the International Commission on Missing Persons (ICMP). He also serves as a board member of The Partnership for a Secure America (a non-profit stressing bipartisanship in foreign policy) and Lampsa (a Greek hotel group). He is a member of the Council on Foreign Relations.

Diplomatic posts
Preceded by R. Nicholas Burns	United States Ambassador to Greece; 2001-2004	Succeeded by Charles P. Ries
Preceded by Richard Kauzlarich	United States Ambassador to Bosnia and Herzegovina; 1999–2001	Succeeded by Clifford G. Bond
