= John F. Tefft =

American diplomat (born 1949)

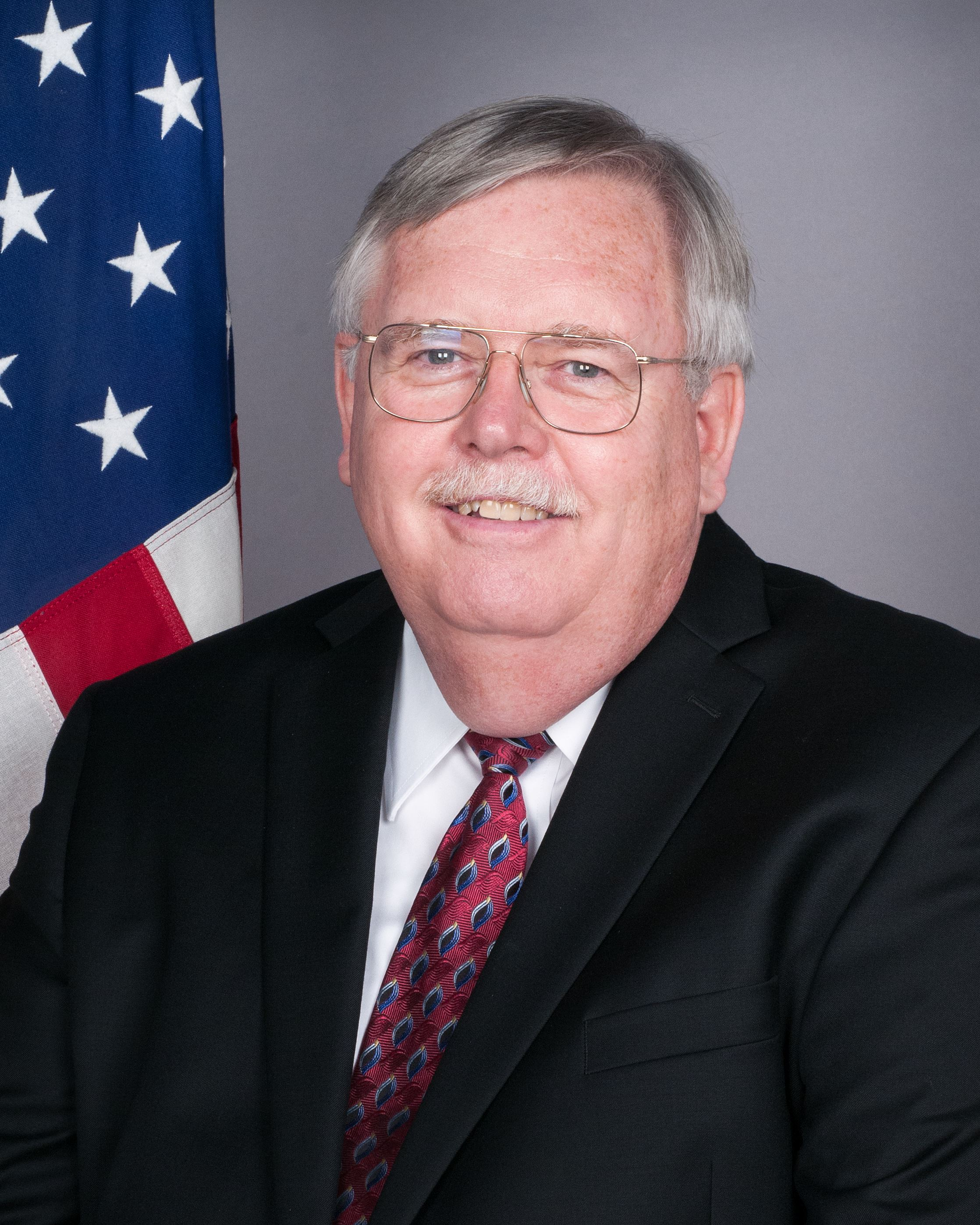
- Official portrait, 2014

8th United States Ambassador to Russia
- In office November 19, 2014 – September 28, 2017
- President: Barack Obama; Donald Trump
- Preceded by: Michael McFaul
- Succeeded by: Jon Huntsman Jr.

7th United States Ambassador to Ukraine
- In office December 7, 2009 – July 29, 2013
- President: Barack Obama
- Preceded by: William B. Taylor Jr.
- Succeeded by: Geoffrey R. Pyatt

United States Ambassador to Georgia
- In office August 23, 2005 – September 9, 2009
- President: George W. Bush; Barack Obama
- Preceded by: Richard Miles
- Succeeded by: John R. Bass

United States Ambassador to Lithuania
- In office August 30, 2000 – May 10, 2003
- President: Bill Clinton; George W. Bush
- Preceded by: Keith C. Smith
- Succeeded by: Stephen D. Mull

Personal details
- Born: August 16, 1949 (age 76) Madison, Wisconsin, U.S.
- Spouse: Mariella Cellitti Tefft
- Children: 2
- Education: Marquette University (BA); Georgetown University (MA)

John F. Tefft (born August 16, 1949) is an American diplomat who has served as a Foreign Service Officer since 1972. He was the United States Ambassador to Russia between July 31, 2014 and September 28, 2017. He had previously served as the United States' ambassador to Ukraine, Georgia, and Lithuania.

== Early life and education ==
Tefft was born in Madison, Wisconsin. He earned a Bachelor of Arts degree from Marquette University and a Master of Arts in history from Georgetown University.

== Career ==
Tefft is a career member of the Senior Foreign Service, with the personal rank of Minister-Counselor. He joined the United States Foreign Service in 1972 and has served in Jerusalem, Budapest, Rome, Moscow, Vilnius, Tbilisi, and Kyiv.

Until his appointment as ambassador to Georgia, he was the deputy Assistant Secretary of State for European Affairs since July 6, 2004. Tefft also served as International Affairs Advisor (Deputy Commandant) of the National War College in Washington, D.C. From 2000 to 2003, he was the United States Ambassador to Lithuania. He served as deputy Chief of Mission at the U.S. Embassy in Moscow from 1996 to 1999 (when Pickering was ambassador), and was chargé d'affaires at the Embassy from November 1996 to September 1997. Tefft served as Director of the Office of Northern European Affairs from 1992 to 1994, Deputy Director of the Office of Soviet Union (later Russian and CIS) Affairs from 1989 to 1992, and Counselor for Political-Military Affairs at the U.S. Embassy in Rome from 1986 to 1989. His other foreign assignments included Budapest and Jerusalem, as well as service on the U.S. delegation to the START I arms control negotiations in 1985.

=== Ambassador to Ukraine ===
On September 30, 2009, President Barack Obama nominated Tefft as the ambassador to Ukraine. He was confirmed by the U.S. Senate on November 20, 2009.

Tefft arrived in Ukraine on December 2, 2009, and President Viktor Yushchenko accepted Tefft's credentials of Ambassador Extraordinary and Plenipotentiary on December 7, 2009. The ambassador expressed his hope for fruitful cooperation. Tefft delivered his speech in Ukrainian.

On February 26, 2013, President Obama nominated Geoffrey R. Pyatt to succeed Tefft as Ambassador of the United States to Ukraine. Pyatt was sworn in on July 30, 2013, and arrived in Ukraine on August 3, 2013.

=== Ambassador to Russia ===
In July 2014, President Obama nominated Tefft as the United States Ambassador to Russia in Moscow, after receiving Russia's approval. The Senate confirmed Tefft in a voice vote on July 31, 2014. The confirmation followed several attempts as a number of ambassadorial appointments were being held up at the time. Strained relations with Russia over pro-separatist activity in eastern Ukraine, the country's annexation of Crimea, and the alleged shooting down of a commercial airliner, prompted senators to finally approve the nomination. He presented his credentials to President Vladimir Putin on November 19, 2014, and left the position on September 28, 2017.

In 2016, the Russian governor of the Samara Oblast, Nikolay Merkushkin, advised AvtoVAZagregat employees for help in paying wages and appeals to US Ambassador John Tefft.

=== Awards ===

Tefft has received a number of awards, including the State Department Distinguished Honor Award in 1992 and the DCM of the Year Award for his service in Moscow in 1999. He received Presidential Meritorious Service Awards in 2001 and 2005.

== See also ==
- List of ambassadors of the United States

Diplomatic posts
Preceded by Keith C. Smith	United States Ambassador to Lithuania; 2000–2003	Succeeded by Stephen D. Mull
Preceded by Richard Miles	United States Ambassador to Georgia; 2005–2009	Succeeded by John R. Bass
Preceded by William B. Taylor Jr.	United States Ambassador to Ukraine; 2009–2013	Succeeded by Geoffrey R. Pyatt
Preceded by Michael McFaul	United States Ambassador to Russia; 2014–2017	Succeeded by Anthony F. Godfrey as Chargé d'affaires
Preceded by Michael McFaul	United States Ambassador to Russia; 2014–2017	Succeeded by Jon Huntsman Jr.
