= Henry Lee Clarke =

American diplomat

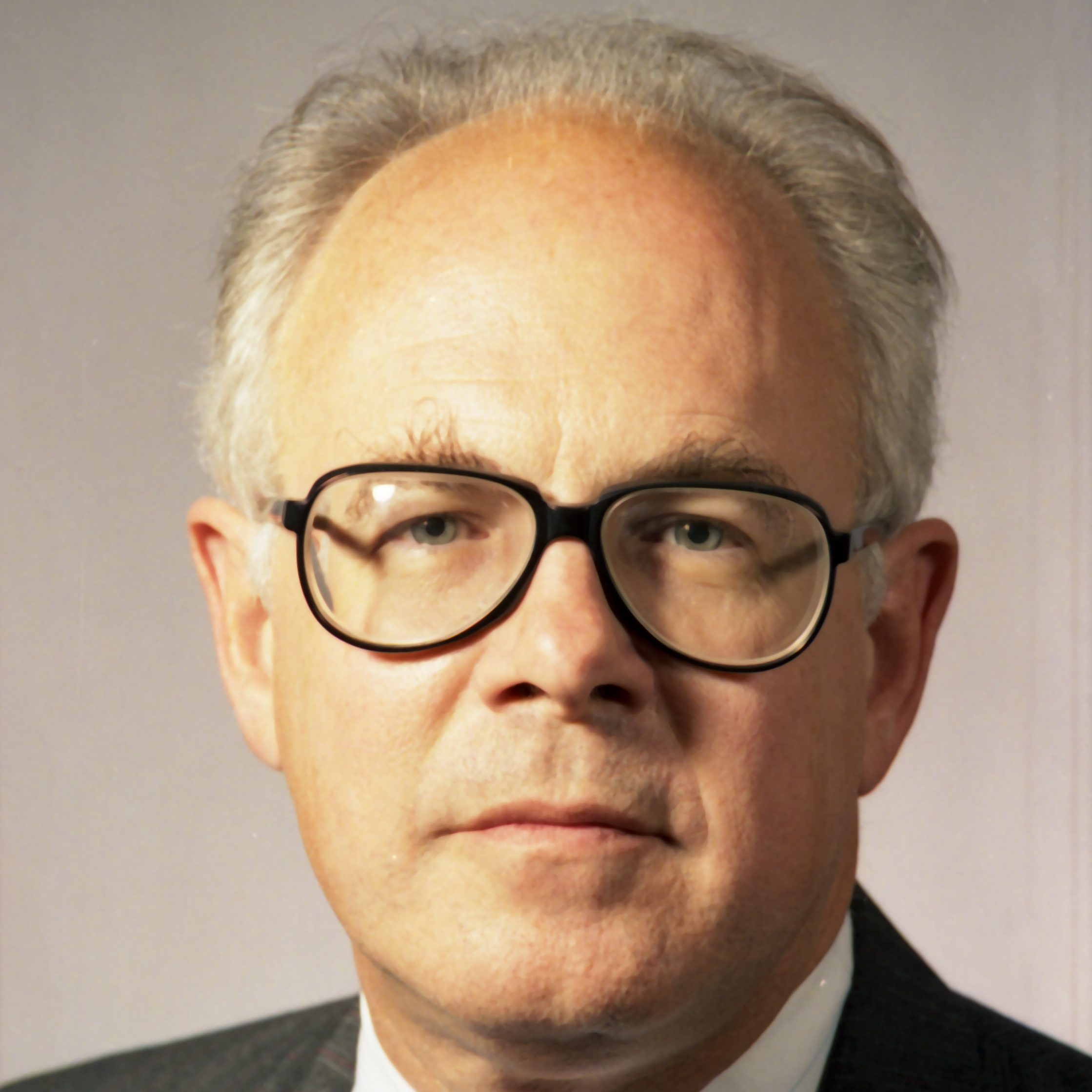

United States Ambassador to Uzbekistan
- In office September 9, 1992 – September 30, 1995
- President: George H. W. Bush
- Succeeded by: Stanley Tuemler Escudero

Personal details
- Born: November 15, 1941 (age 84) Fort Benning, Georgia, U.S.

Henry Lee Clarke (born November 15, 1941) is an American diplomat. He served as the United States Ambassador to Uzbekistan from 1992 to 1995.

== Early life ==
Henry Lee Clarke was born on November 15, 1941, in Fort Benning, Georgia. He graduated from Dartmouth College, where he earned a bachelor of arts degree in 1962, and he earned a master of public affairs degree from Harvard University in 1967.

== Career ==
Clarke joined the United States Foreign Service was a career diplomat. He was "Officer-in-Charge of Trade and Industrial Policy" at the State Department's Bureau of European and Eurasian Affairs from 1980 to 1981, "Economic Counselor" at the Embassy of the United States, Moscow from 1982 to 1985, "Deputy Chief of Mission" at the Embassy of the United States, Bucharest from 1985 to 1989, and "Economic Counselor" at the Embassy of the United States, Tel Aviv from 1989 to 1992.

Clarke served as the United States Ambassador to Uzbekistan from 1992 to 1995. In a 1995 interview with The New York Times, Clarke said opium from Afghanistan was transported through Uzbekistan.

== Personal life ==
Clarke is married, has three children, and resides in Springfield, Virginia.
