= Robert Finn (diplomat) =

American diplomat (born 1945)

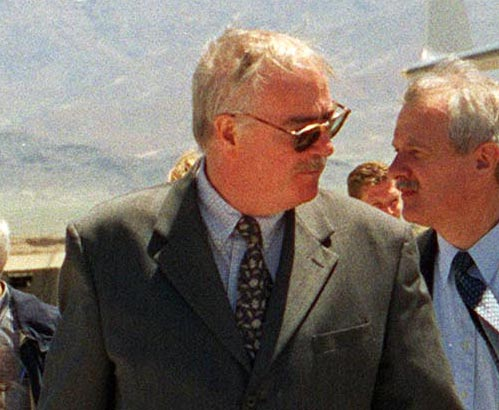

14th United States Ambassador to Afghanistan
- In office March 21, 2002 – August 1, 2004
- President: George W. Bush
- Preceded by: Adolph Dubs
- Succeeded by: Zalmay Khalilzad

United States Ambassador to Tajikistan
- In office November 11, 1998 – July 13, 2001
- President: Bill Clinton; George W. Bush
- Preceded by: R. Grant Smith
- Succeeded by: Franklin Huddle

United States Ambassador to Azerbaijan Acting
- In office March 16, 1992 – September 15, 1992
- President: George H. W. Bush
- Preceded by: Diplomatic relations established
- Succeeded by: Richard Miles

Personal details
- Born: December 19, 1945 (age 80)
- Education: St. John's University; New York University; Princeton University

Robert Patrick John Finn (born December 19, 1945) is an American scholar of Turkish Studies and International Relations, and was the first United States ambassador to Afghanistan in more than 20 years, from March 22, 2002, until August 1, 2004. He was succeeded by Zalmay Khalilzad.

== Life ==
Finn grew up in the Parkchester planned community in the Bronx, in New York City and earned a B.A. in American Literature and European History with honors from St. John's University, an M.A. in Near Eastern Studies from New York University and an M.A. and a Ph.D. in Near Eastern Studies from Princeton University in 1978. Finn's doctoral dissertation was titled "The early Turkish novel: 1872-1900." He currently holds a professorship there in Turkic studies and international relations. He speaks fifteen languages, including most Central Asian tongues.

Finn was a member of the Foreign Service from 1978 to August 2005. In 1992, he opened (as chargé d'affaires) the United States embassy to Azerbaijan and served as charge and deputy chief of mission there for three years. He also served as the U.S. ambassador to Tajikistan from 1998 through 2001. He has also served in Turkey, Croatia and Pakistan.

== Works ==
- The Early Turkish Novel, 1872-1900 (Isis Press, 1984)

Translations

- Nazli Eray (2006). Orpheus. University of Texas at Austin. ISBN 9780292714090.
- Orhan Pamuk (2012). Silent House. Alfred A. Knopf. ISBN 9780307958556. "Robert Finn silent."

Editor

- (with Wolfgang F. Danspeckgruber) of Building State and Security in Afghanistan (Woodrow Wilson School of Public and International Affairs, Princeton University, 2007); Liechtenstein Institute on Self-Determination, 2007, ISBN 9780977354443

Diplomatic posts
Preceded by First Ambassador	United States Ambassador to Azerbaijan as Chargé d'affaires ad interim 1992	Succeeded by Richard Miles
Preceded by R. Grant Smith	United States Ambassador to Tajikistan; 1998–2001	Succeeded by Franklin Huddle
Preceded by Adolph Dubs (assassinated in 1979) Ryan Crocker as Chargé d'affaires	United States Ambassador to Afghanistan; 2002–2004	Succeeded by Zalmay Khalilzad
