= Stanley Escudero =

American diplomat (born 1942)

Stanley Tuemler Escudero
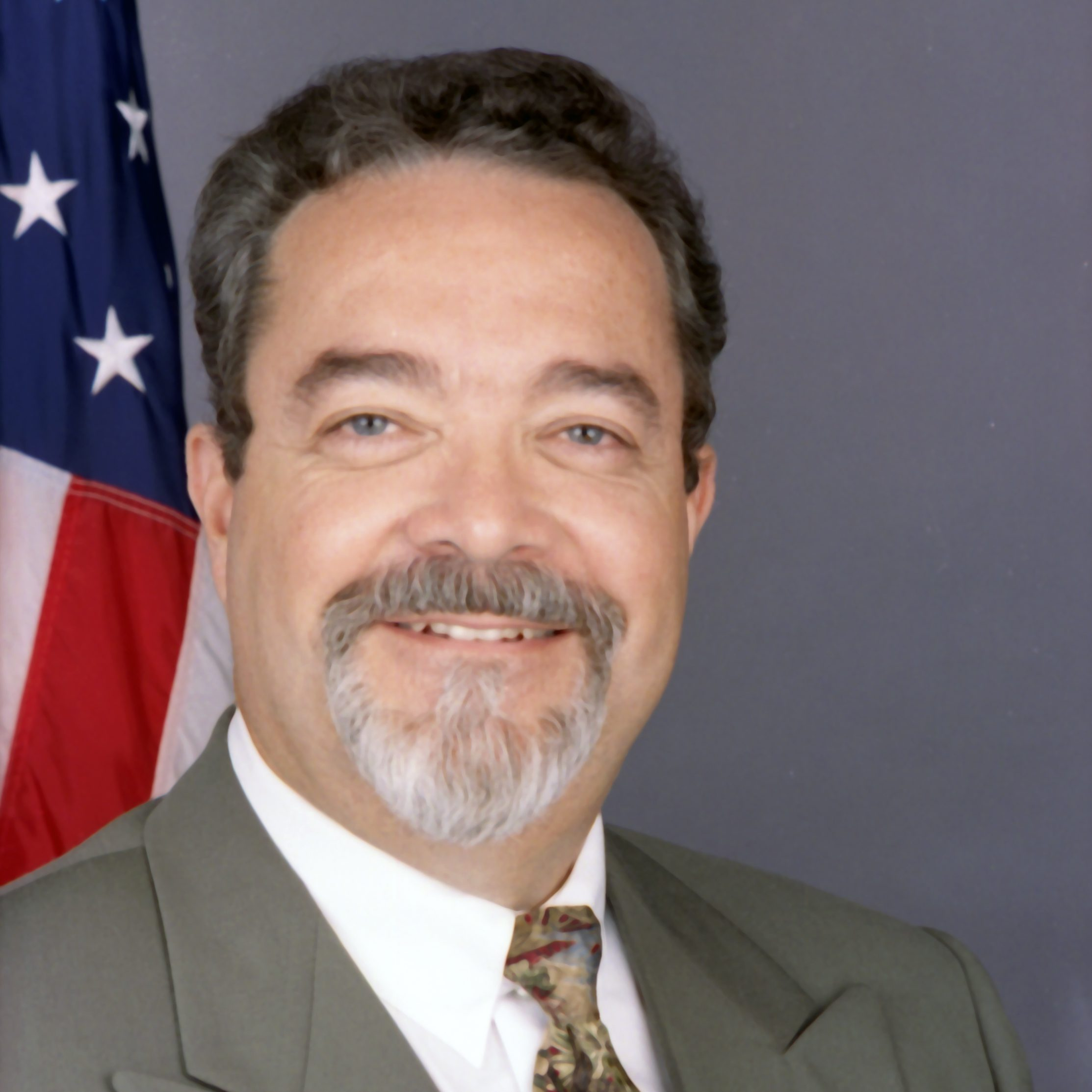

United States Ambassador to Tajikistan
- In office October 19, 1992 – June 1, 1995
- President: George H. W. Bush; Bill Clinton
- Preceded by: Edmund McWilliams
- Succeeded by: R. Grant Smith

United States Ambassador to Uzbekistan
- In office October 12, 1995 – October 3, 1997
- President: Bill Clinton
- Preceded by: Henry Lee Clarke
- Succeeded by: Joseph A. Presel

United States Ambassador to Azerbaijan
- In office December 4, 1997 – October 1, 2000
- President: Bill Clinton
- Preceded by: Richard Kauzlarich
- Succeeded by: Ross L. Wilson

Personal details
- Born: March 10, 1942 (age 84) Daytona Beach, Florida, U.S.
- Education: University of Florida (BA)
- Profession: Diplomat

Stanley Tuemler Escudero (born March 10, 1942) is an American retired diplomat who served the United States Foreign Service in several capacities. He was the ambassador to Azerbaijan, Uzbekistan and Tajikistan throughout the 1990s.

== Early life and education ==
Escudero was born in Daytona Beach, Florida on March 10, 1942. He received his Bachelor of Arts degree from the University of Florida in 1965.

== Career ==
Escudero first came to prominence for his outspoken views on Iran in the 1970s. While serving in the U.S. Embassy in Tehran in the mid 1970s, he questioned the Shah's longevity in power. This challenge to the basic tenets of U.S. policy in the region would probably have ended his career, had the Shah not been overthrown soon afterwards. As the Iranian Revolution unfolded, Escudero was sent back to Iran to gather information on what was happening.

Escudero served as the U.S. ambassador to Tajikistan from 1992 to 1995. He was the ambassador to Uzbekistan from 1995 to 1997 and of Azerbaijan from 1997 to 2000.

== Sources ==
- Tajikistan relations at U.S. State Dept.
- Escudero's Bio
- The Political Graveyard: Index to Politicians: Esaias to Esters

Diplomatic posts
Preceded by Edmund McWilliams	United States Ambassador to Tajikistan; 1992–1995	Succeeded by R. Grant Smith
Preceded by Henry Lee Clarke	United States Ambassador to Uzbekistan; 1995–1997	Succeeded by Joseph A. Presel
Preceded by Richard Kauzlarich	United States Ambassador to Azerbaijan; 1997–2000	Succeeded by Ross L. Wilson
