= Joseph A. Presel =

American diplomat (1941–2021)

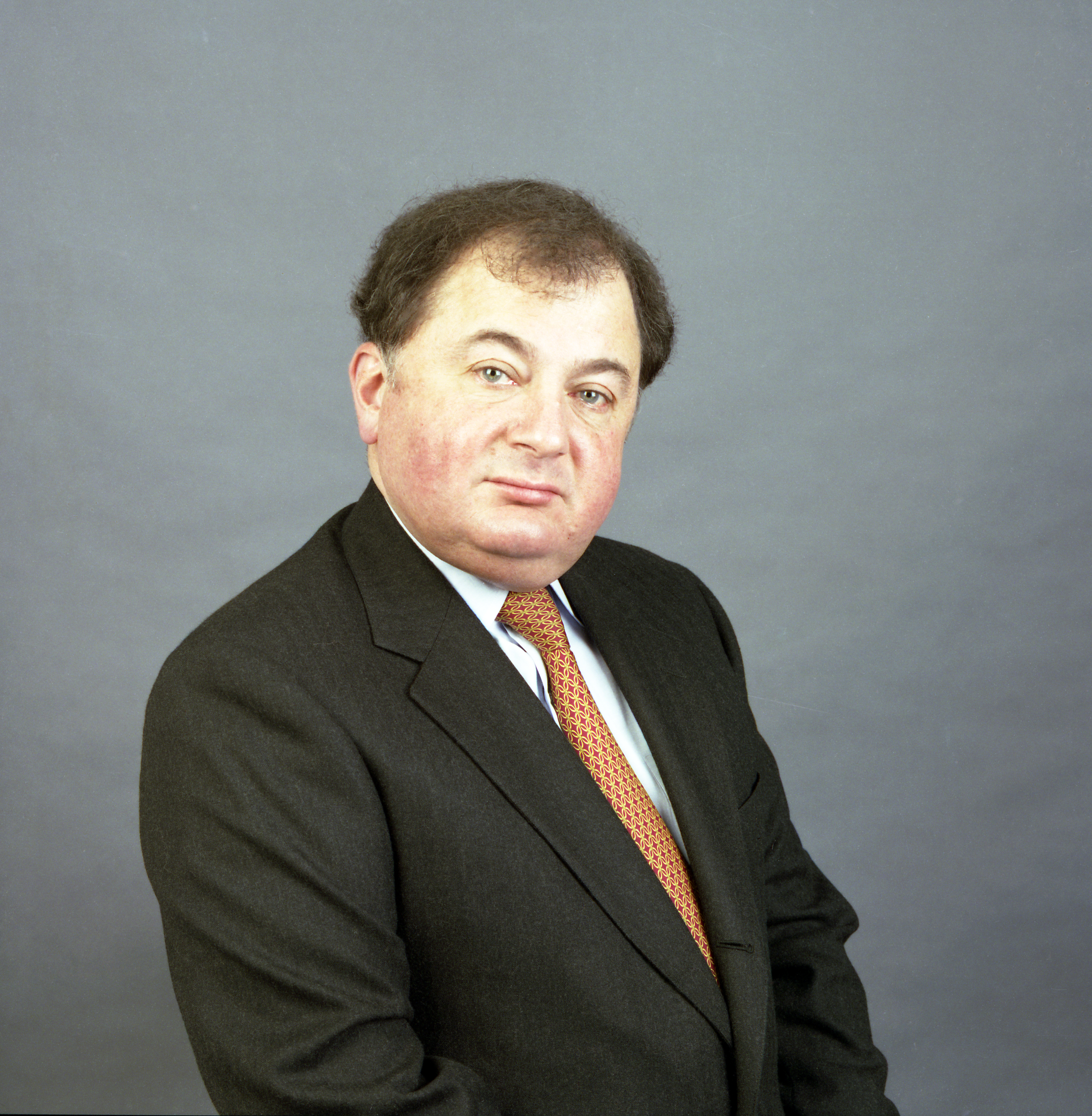

United States Ambassador to Uzbekistan
- In office November 10, 1997 – October 21, 2000
- President: Bill Clinton
- Preceded by: Stanley Tuemler Escudero
- Succeeded by: John Edward Herbst

Personal details
- Born: December 23, 1941 Providence, Rhode Island, U.S.
- Died: December 19, 2021 (aged 79) Washington, D.C., U.S.
- Spouse: Claire-Lise Junod Presel
- Profession: Career FSO

Joseph A. Presel (December 23, 1941 – December 19, 2021) was an American diplomat who served as United States Ambassador to Uzbekistan.

== Career ==
Presel joined the Foreign Service in 1963 and has specialized in Russian, multilateral diplomacy, and political military affairs. He has served in Turkey, France, Moscow, Belgrade (as Deputy Chief of Mission), and twice in the U.S. Arms Control Delegation in Vienna, the second time as Deputy U.S. Representative. His Washington service includes two assignments to the Arms Control and Disarmament Agency, service in the European, Politico-Military, International Organizations and INR bureaus, as well as several assignments in the offices of Department of State principals.

Ambassador Presel, of Rhode Island, served as the Coordinator for Regional Affairs in the New Independent States since 1993 and became Special Negotiator for Nagorno-Karabakh in 1995, with the rank of Ambassador.

The President nominated Presel, a career member of the Senior Foreign Service, Class of Minister-Counselor, to be Ambassador to the Republic of Uzbekistan. Joseph Presel was appointed to this post on November 10, 1997, and presented his credentials to President Islam Karimov on December 3, 1997. Ambassador Presel left Uzbekistan on October 21, 2000.

== Life ==
Presel was a graduate of Providence Country Day School and Harvard College, and studied at St. Antony's College, Oxford University. He is married to Claire-Lise Junod Presel.

Diplomatic posts
Preceded by Stanley Tuemler Escudero	United States Ambassador to Uzbekistan; 1997–2000	Succeeded by John Edward Herbst
