= Richard B. Norland =

American diplomat (born 1955)

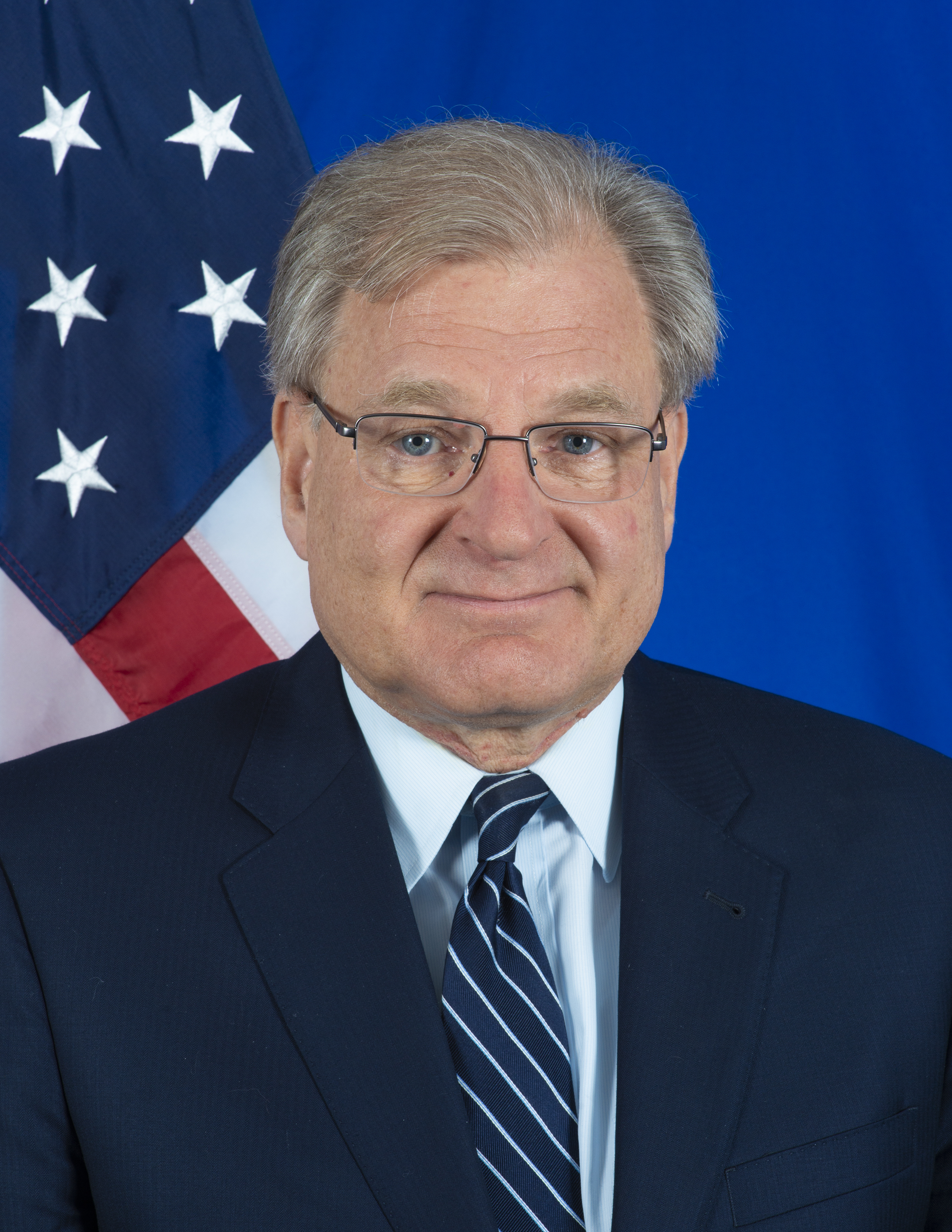

United States Ambassador to Libya
- In office August 8, 2019 – September 8, 2022
- President: Donald Trump; Joe Biden
- Preceded by: Peter W. Bodde
- Succeeded by: Jeremy Berndt (Chargé d'affaires)

United States Ambassador to Georgia
- In office September 10, 2012 – July 18, 2015
- President: Barack Obama
- Preceded by: John Bass
- Succeeded by: Ian Kelly

United States Ambassador to Uzbekistan
- In office September 20, 2007 – July 24, 2010
- President: George W. Bush; Barack Obama
- Preceded by: Jon Purnell
- Succeeded by: George Krol

Personal details
- Born: Richard Boyce Norland; 1955 (age 70–71) Morocco
- Spouse: Mary Hartnett
- Education: Georgetown University; Johns Hopkins University; National Defense University

Richard Boyce Norland (born 1955) is an American diplomat. He served as the United States Ambassador to Libya from August 2019 to September 2022.

== Career ==
Ambassador Richard Norland previously served as the Foreign Policy Advisor to the Chairman of the Joint Chiefs of Staff, General Joseph Dunford. Prior to that he served as U.S. Ambassador to Georgia (2012–2015), Deputy Commandant/International Affairs Advisor at the National War College (2010–2012), U.S. Ambassador to Uzbekistan (2007–2010), and Deputy Chief of Mission at the American Embassy in Kabul, Afghanistan (2005–2007) and Riga, Latvia (2003–2005).

From October 2002 through January 2003, Richard Norland served in Mazar-e-Sharif, Afghanistan as a diplomat with the U.S. Army Civil Affairs team promoting political and economic reconstruction.

Richard Norland was Director for European Affairs at the National Security Council for two years during the Clinton and Bush administrations, focusing in particular on the Northern Ireland peace process, as well as on the Baltic States, OSCE, and a number of key European partners. He served as Political Counselor at the American Embassy in Dublin, Ireland from 1995 through the negotiation of the 1998 Good Friday Agreement.

Richard Norland served from 1988 to 1990 as Political Officer at the U.S. Embassy in Moscow, USSR during President Gorbachev's tenure and the period of glasnost and perestroika. He was subsequently detailed to the Pentagon's Office of the Secretary of Defense, where he worked on policy issues following the break-up of the Soviet Union. He served in 1993 as the U.S. representative and acting mission head on the CSCE Mission to Georgia, addressing conflicts in South Ossetia and Abkhazia, and later visited Chechnya in a similar capacity.

Earlier in his career, Richard Norland served in the United States' northernmost diplomatic office, 250 miles north of the Arctic Circle, as Chief of the U.S. Information Office in Tromsø, Norway. He later served as Senior Arctic Official coordinating the U.S. chairmanship of the Arctic Council. He was also a Special Assistant (for African affairs) to the Under Secretary for Political Affairs. He served as Norway-Denmark desk officer, and as assistant desk officer for South Africa. His first tour was in Manama, Bahrain.

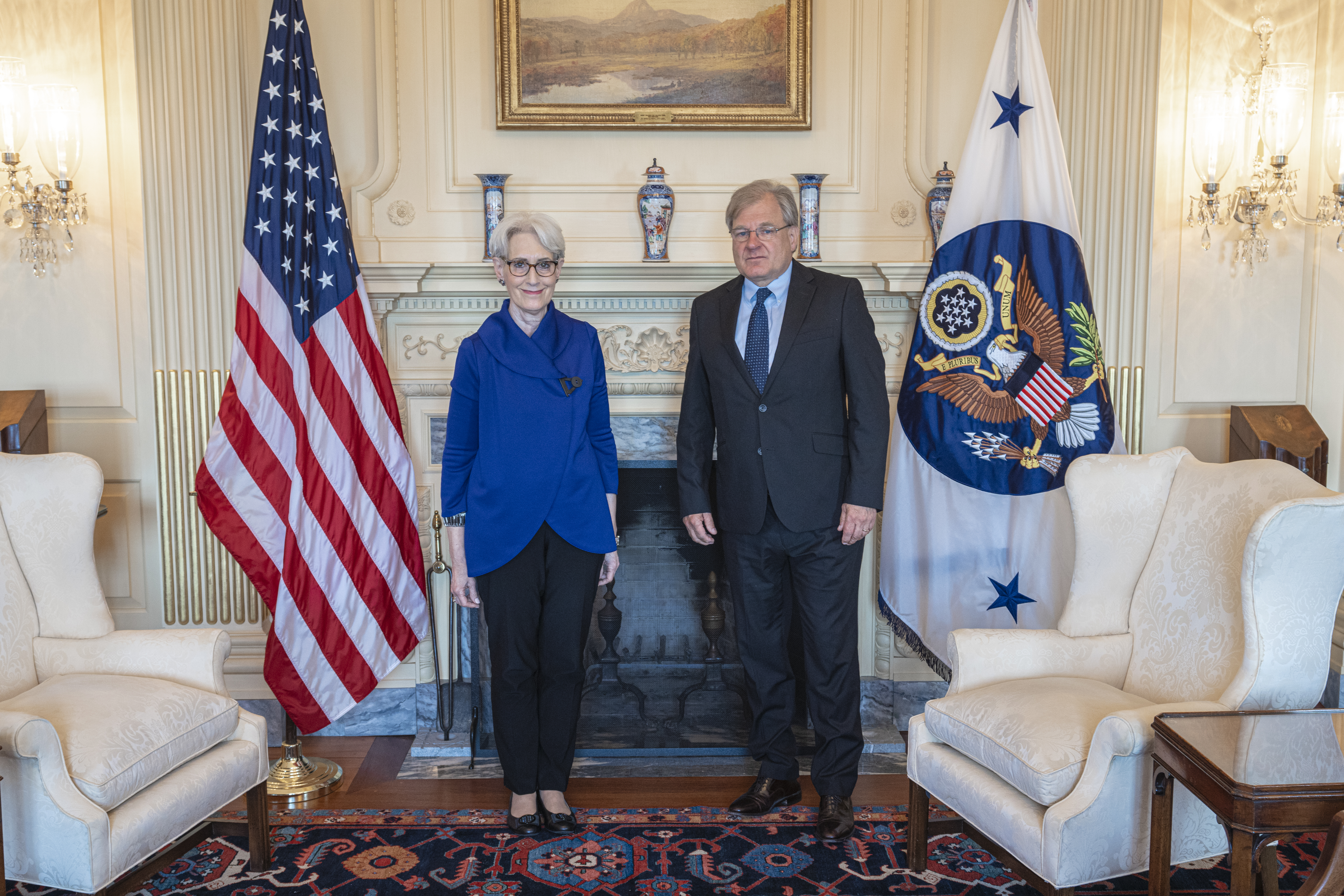
Norland meets with Deputy Secretary of State Wendy R. Sherman at the U.S. Department of State in Washington, D.C. in June 2021.

=== United States Ambassador to Libya ===
On April 2, 2019, President Donald Trump nominated Richard Norland to be the United States Ambassador to Libya. On August 1, 2019, the Senate confirmed his nomination by voice vote. He assumed office on August 8, 2019.

== Personal life ==
The son of an American diplomat, Ambassador Norland was born in Morocco and grew up in Africa and Europe as well as the United States. Prior to joining the Foreign Service in 1980, Ambassador Norland worked as a legislative analyst in the Iowa House of Representatives. He graduated from Georgetown University's School of Foreign Service in 1977. He has master's degrees from the Johns Hopkins University School of Advanced International Studies and the National War College. He speaks Russian, French and Norwegian. He and his wife, Mary Hartnett, have two children.

== See also ==
- United States Ambassador to Georgia
- Georgia–United States relations

Diplomatic posts
Preceded by Jon Purnell	United States Ambassador to Uzbekistan; 2007–2010	Succeeded by George Krol
Preceded by John Bass	United States Ambassador to Georgia; 2012–2015	Succeeded by Ian Kelly
Preceded by Peter W. Bodde	United States Ambassador to Libya; 2019–2022	Incumbent
