= James W. Pardew =

American diplomat (1944–2021)

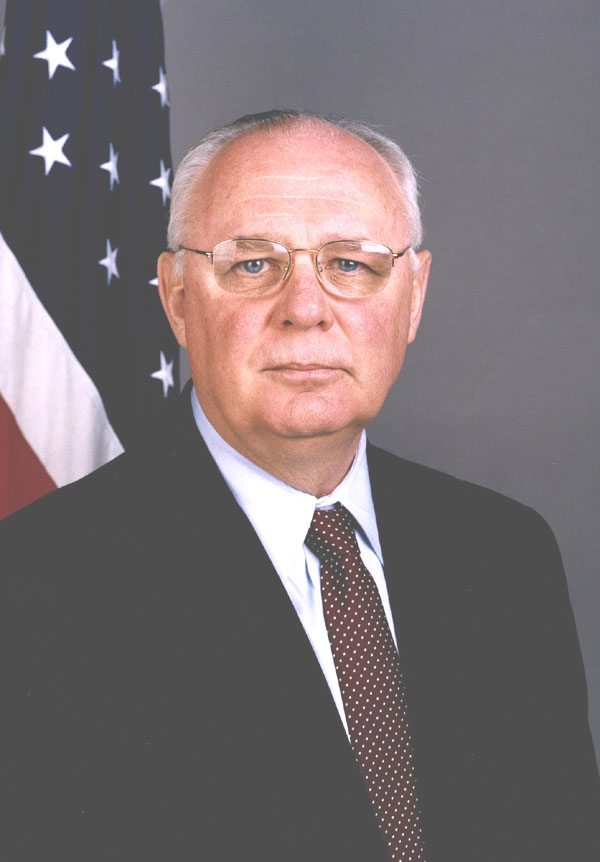

United States Ambassador to Bulgaria
- In office April 1, 2002 – July 30, 2005
- President: George W. Bush
- Preceded by: Richard Monroe Miles
- Succeeded by: John Beyrle

Personal details
- Born: James William Pardew Jr. February 5, 1944 Memphis, Tennessee
- Died: June 2, 2021 (aged 77) Arlington, Virginia
- Spouse: Kathy Hoffman
- Children: 3
- Profession: Diplomat, Ambassador, Military officer
- Awards: Defense Superior Service Medal; Legion of Merit (2); Bronze Star (2); Distinguished Honor Award

James William Pardew Jr. (February 5, 1944 – June 2, 2021) was an American diplomat, international negotiator, military officer, and United States Ambassador to Bulgaria. After serving as a military intelligence officer in the United States Army for 28 years, Pardew entered the arena of international diplomacy with a heavy focus on the Balkans, where he was instrumental in coordinating agreements and peace resolutions, as well as heading major State Department programs such as the Bosnian Train-and-equip program.

== Personal life and education ==
Pardew was born in Memphis, Tennessee on February 5, 1944, and was raised in Jonesboro, Arkansas. He graduated from Nettleton High School in 1962 and attended Arkansas State University, where he was a member of the Reserve Officer Training Corps. While attending ASU, he edited the student newspaper and yearbook, was active in student government, and president of the local Tau Kappa Epsilon fraternity. He graduated in 1966 with a B.S. in journalism and commissioned as a second lieutenant in the United States Army shortly afterward. Pardew later graduated from Loyola University with an M.A. in political science in 1973 and the U.S. Army War College. Pardew died on June 2, 2021, at the age of 77 in Arlington, Virginia.

== Military service ==
Pardew received an ROTC commission in the U.S. Army during the Vietnam War. In Vietnam, he served in the 1st Air Cavalry Division and the 11th Armored Cavalry Regiment as an intelligence officer. During his career, he saw assignments in Turkey, Germany, Japan, and Somalia, where he took part in Operation Restore Hope. On the Army General staff in the Pentagon, Pardew held positions as Director of Foreign Intelligence and Chief of Current Intelligence. Also during his career, he was the G-2 (Intelligence), 8th Infantry Division In Germany and Deputy J-2 (Intelligence), Joint Staff in the Pentagon. For his military service, he received the Defense Superior Service Medal, the Legion of Merit (2), the Bronze Star (2) and the Air Medal. He was also awarded the National Intelligence Distinguished Service Medal by the Director of Central Intelligence. Pardew left the Army in 1994 with the rank of colonel, after 28 years of service.

== Diplomacy ==
Ambassador Pardew began his civil service and diplomatic career in 1995, as a member of the Senior Executive Service and Chief of the Balkan Task Force in the Office of the Under Secretary of Defense for Policy, Department of Defense. He subsequently served in the State Department from 1996 until 2008. He was nominated for the rank of Ambassador by President Clinton and confirmed by the U.S. Senate in 1997.

=== Dayton Peace Agreement in Bosnia ===
Pardew was appointed the Secretary of Defense Representative to the U.S. Negotiating Team following a tragic vehicle accident in August 1995 in Bosnia, that killed his predecessor, Dr. Joseph Kruzel, Deputy Assistant Secretary of State Robert Frasure, and Air Force Colonel Nelson Drew (also members of the negotiating team). Pardew participated in the negotiating process led by Ambassador Richard Holbrooke from his appointment until the parties reached an agreement at Wright Patterson Air Force Base in Dayton, Ohio in November 1995. He participated in the international signing ceremony of the Dayton Agreement, hosted by President Jacques Chirac of France in Paris on December 14, 1995, as the representative of the Secretary of Defense. Pardew was awarded the Department of State Distinguished Honor Award and the Department of Defense Medal for Distinguished Civilian Service for his contributions to peace in Bosnia.

=== Bosnia Train and Equip Program ===
Pardew was assigned to direct an inter-agency team in Washington in 1996 to implement an informal agreement between U.S. President Bill Clinton and Bosnian President Alija Izetbegović to assist the Bosnian Federation in developing a national defense system which would provide military security within Bosnia.

This unique endeavor, known as the Bosnian Train and Equip Program, consisted of staff officers from the U.S. Defense Department, State Department, and Intelligence Community. Using international donor funding and equipment, and equipment made available to the program by the U.S. Congress, the T&E program assisted the Federation in developing a defensive military capability which ultimately enabled U.S. and NATO forces to reduce their presence in Bosnia. The program was valued at an estimated US$500 million (equivalent to US$1026.42 million in 2025). Additionally, the program reduced the influence of extremist elements in the country, oriented Bosnia toward NATO and Europe, and served as the basis for full military integration within Bosnia, providing for a consolidated Ministry of Defense.

=== War and peace in Kosovo ===
From 1999 to 2001, Pardew was the Deputy Special Advisor to the President and Secretary of State for Democracy in the Balkans during the NATO conflict in Kosovo and the subsequent peace settlement. In that capacity, Pardew engaged directly in negotiations over Kosovo with President Slobodan Milošević of Serbia and with a variety of Kosovo political leaders. He was the Washington coordinator for the international Kosovo Verification Mission. Following the successful NATO bombing campaign, Pardew assisted in establishing U.S. and international civilian presences in Kosovo and in the development of local Kosovo institutions of government and security.

=== Ohrid Framework Agreement in Macedonia ===
Secretary of State Powell dispatched Ambassador Pardew to Macedonia in the early summer of 2001 to seek a solution to an ethnic conflict with the potential to escalate into a full-scale civil war with consequences for the entire region. Pardew, as the U.S. negotiator, joined with Francois Leotard of France, the European Union negotiator, to seek a peaceful settlement to the disputes. After weeks of negotiations in Skopje and at the Presidential retreat on Lake Ohrid, the parties agreed to the Framework Agreement for Macedonia. The Ohrid Agreement was signed by the parties and witnessed by Pardew and Leotard in August 2001.

=== U.S. Ambassador to Bulgaria ===
President George W. Bush appointed Pardew the U.S. Ambassador to Bulgaria in 2002. During his tenure as the United States Ambassador to Bulgaria from 2002 to 2005, Bulgaria became a full member of NATO and completed all accession negotiations for European Union membership. Bulgaria also cooperated closely with the U.S. in establishing a joint military training facility in Bulgaria and in destroying missiles and other military technology left over from the Cold War. In addition, Ambassador Pardew oversaw the completion of a new $70 million (equivalent to US$119.32 million in 2025) U.S. Embassy complex in Sofia. The President of Bulgaria presented Pardew with the Stara Planina Medal at the end of his service in Bulgaria.

=== NATO: Afghanistan, Iraq, and the independence of Kosovo ===
Pardew was Deputy Assistant Secretary General of NATO for Operation and Crisis Management, from 2005 to 2008. During that period, he directed an international staff organization, based in Brussels, that was engaged in operational policy development for the Secretary General of NATO for its operations in Afghanistan, Kosovo, and the NATO training mission in Iraq.

Based on his extensive background in Balkan conflicts, Pardew also participated as the NATO representative to the Contact Group deliberations, dealing with international policy toward Kosovo. He also provided NATO input to the United Nations organization which produced the Ahtisaari Plan, eventually resulting in the independence of Kosovo.

== Publications ==
- Peacemakers: American Leadership and the End of Genocide in the Balkans.
- Guest writer for the Arkansas Democrat-Gazette
- Guest writer for "The Hill"

Diplomatic posts
Preceded by Richard Miles	United States Ambassador to Bulgaria; 2002–2005	Succeeded by John Beyrle
