= R. Grant Smith =

American diplomat

R. Grant Smith (born 1939) is an American diplomat and previous United States Ambassador to Tajikistan. Smith, originally from New Jersey, served in the foreign service in India and Nepal and was Deputy Ambassador of the U.S. Embassy in New Delhi. He also served as Director of the South Asia Office at the U.S. State Department.

Smith entered the Foreign Service in 1963 and went on to serve overseas in Pakistan, Nepal, Belize, India, the Central African Republic, and Tajikistan.

He is a senior fellow at the Central Asia-Caucasus Institute at Johns Hopkins University.

== Sources ==
- Brief bio at Moynihan Institute
- The Political Graveyard: Index to Politicians: Smith, O to R

Diplomatic posts
Preceded by Stanley Tuemler Escudero	United States Ambassador to Tajikistan; 1995–1998	Succeeded by Robert Finn
