= Richard Kauzlarich =

American diplomat (born 1944)

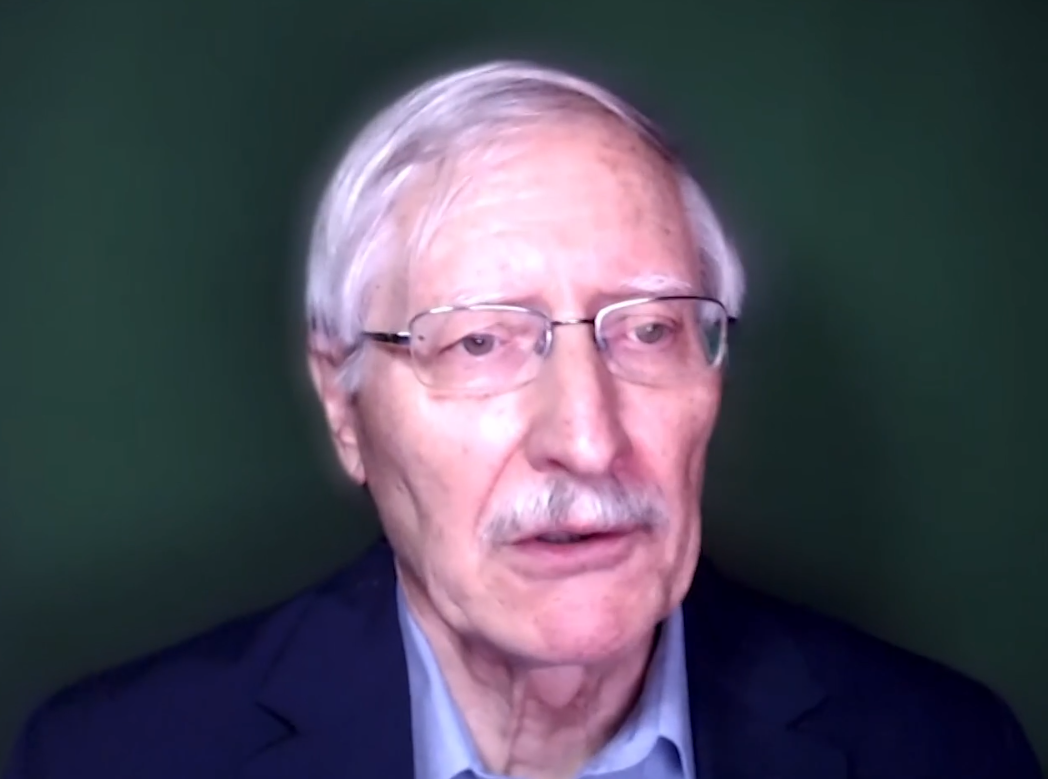

United States Ambassador to Azerbaijan
- In office April 20, 1994 – July 20, 1997
- President: Bill Clinton
- Preceded by: Richard Miles
- Succeeded by: Stanley Tuemler Escudero

United States Ambassador to Bosnia and Herzegovina
- In office August 1, 1997 – August 20, 1999
- President: Bill Clinton
- Preceded by: John K. Menzies
- Succeeded by: Thomas J. Miller

Personal details
- Born: August 18, 1944 (age 82) Moline, Illinois, U.S.
- Education: Black Hawk College; Valparaiso University; Indiana University Bloomington; University of Michigan
- Profession: Career FSO

Richard Dale Kauzlarich (born August 18, 1944) is an American diplomat, writer, and intelligence analyst.

== Early life and education ==
Kauzlarich was born in Moline, Illinois on August 18, 1944. He graduated from Black Hawk College in 1964 with an associate of arts degree. He received his B.A. from Valparaiso University and M.A.s from Indiana University Bloomington and the University of Michigan.

== Career ==
Kauzlarich served as Deputy Assistant Secretary of State for International Organization Affairs in 1984–1986 and as deputy director of the State Department's Policy Planning Staff in 1986–1989, handling global and international economic issues.

Kauzlarich was Deputy Assistant Secretary of State in the Bureau of European Affairs in 1991–93, responsible for relations with the former Soviet Union and economic ties with the European Union.

Between 1993 and 1994, he served as Senior Deputy to the Secretary of State's and the President's Special Representative to the Newly Independent States (NIS), responsible for conflict resolution in the Caucasus region and U.S. economic relations with the NIS.

In the Foreign Service, he served at U.S. Embassies in Ethiopia, Israel, and Togo, as well as serving as United States Ambassador to Azerbaijan in 1994–1997 and to Bosnia and Herzegovina in 1997–1999.

After a 32-year career in the Foreign Service, Kauzlarich was Director of the Special Initiative on the Muslim World at the United States Institute of Peace.

In December 2001, his report, "Time for Change? US Policy in the Transcaucasus" was published by the Century Foundation.

In Spring 2002, Kauzlarich joined the National Intelligence Council (NIC). He was appointed National Intelligence Officer for Europe in September 2003.

In 2020, Kauzlarich, along with over 130 other former Republican national security officials, signed a statement that asserted that President Trump was unfit to serve another term, and "To that end, we are firmly convinced that it is in the best interest of our nation that Vice President Joe Biden be elected as the next President of the United States, and we will vote for him."

== Sources ==
- Bio at National Intelligence Council, Office of the Director of National Intelligence
- Bio at The Globalist

Diplomatic posts
Preceded by Richard Miles	United States Ambassador to Azerbaijan; 1994–1997	Succeeded by Stanley Tuemler Escudero
Preceded by John K. Menzies	United States Ambassador to Bosnia and Herzegovina; 1997–1999	Succeeded by Thomas J. Miller
