= International Commission on Missing Persons =

International human rights organization

Coordinates: 43.86654°N 18.40928°E

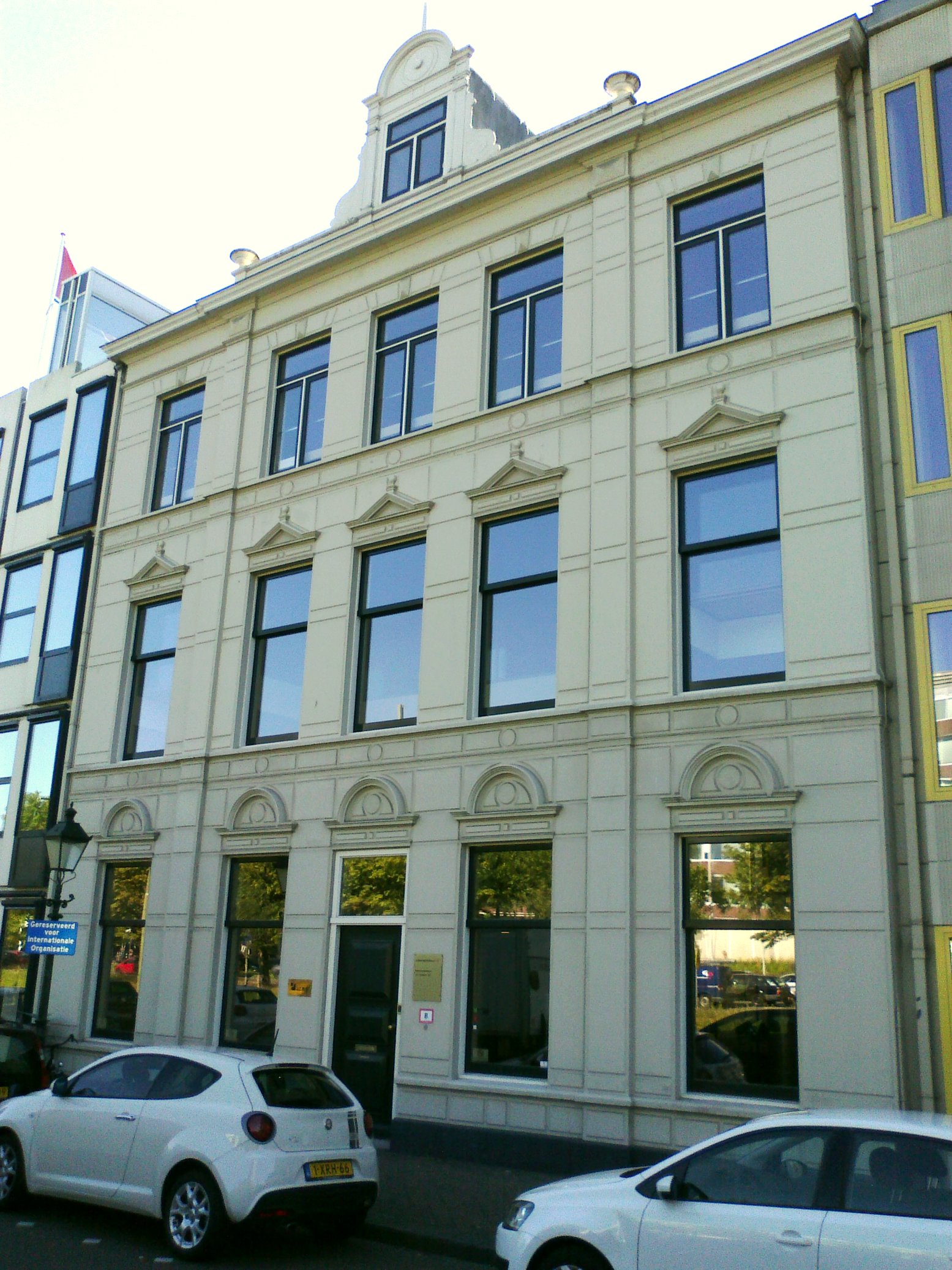
- ICMP headquarters in The Hague
- Formation: 1996
- Type: IGO
- Purpose: Human rights, forensic sciences, government relations, relief efforts
- Headquarters: The Hague
- Location: Netherlands
- Chair: Thomas Miller
- Director-General: Kathryne Bomberger
- Staff: 170 (January 2007)
- Website: www.icmp.int

The International Commission on Missing Persons (ICMP) is an intergovernmental organization that addresses the issue of persons missing as a result of armed conflicts, violations of human rights, and natural disasters. It is headquartered in The Hague, Netherlands. It assists governments in the exhumation of mass graves and DNA identification of missing persons, provides support to family associations of missing persons, and assists in creating strategies and institutions to search for missing persons. In December 2014, a treaty was signed which established the commission as an International Organisation. The treaty has five signatories: the Netherlands, the United Kingdom, Sweden, Belgium and Luxembourg. It designates The Hague (Netherlands) as the seat of the organization.

== History ==
ICMP was established at the behest of United States president Bill Clinton in 1996 at the G7 summit in Lyon, France, to confront the issue of persons missing as a result of the different conflicts relevant to Bosnia and Herzegovina, the Republic of Croatia, and the then Federal Republic of Yugoslavia from 1991 to 1995. ICMP was first chaired by former U.S. secretary of state Cyrus Vance, who was succeeded as chairman by U.S. senator Bob Dole. ICMP's current chairman is Thomas Miller. Although based in Sarajevo, Bosnia and Herzegovina (BiH), ICMP is currently engaged in a wide-ranging area of operations that include the former conflict zones in the Western Balkans and the Middle East, as well as areas affected by natural disasters, such as tsunami affected regions of South Asia and the U.S. state of Louisiana following Hurricane Katrina. In 2001, at the request of New York City authorities, ICMP also sent two of its leading forensic scientists to the U.S. following the September 11, 2001, attacks on the World Trade Center.

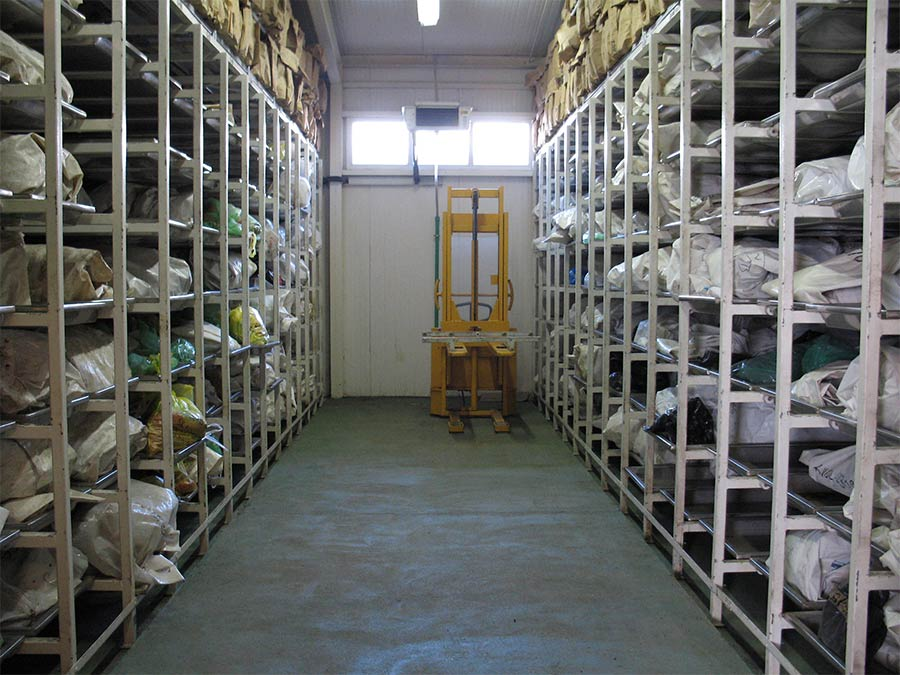
CMP's Podrinje Identification Project (PIP) was formed to deal with the identification primarily of victims of 1995 Srebrenica massacre. PIP includes a facility for storing, processing, and handling exhumed remains. Much of the remains are only fragments or commingled body fragments since they were recovered from secondary mass graves. The photo depicts one section of the refrigerated mortuary.

In the Western Balkans, ICMP is closely associated with three forensic facilities, two of which focus on human remains related to the fall of Srebrenica. These are the Podrinje Identification Project (PIP) and the Lukavac Reassociation Centre (LKRC). The Krajina Identification Project (KIP) is the primary facility for remains related to the area of Sanski Most and Prijedor. ICMP has offices in Sarajevo and Tuzla (Western Balkans Program), Tirana (Albania Program), Baghdad and Arbil (Iraq Program), Beirut (Syria-MENA Program), Bogota (Colombia Program), and Nuevo León (Mexico Program), as well as Headquarters in The Hague, the Netherlands.

By the end of 2018, ICMP's efforts had resulted in DNA-assisted identifications of 20,473 individuals.

In June 2008, the Philippines was struck by Typhoon Frank which caused over 1,000 deaths. In an effort to assist the Philippines in identifying persons who perished as a consequence of this tragedy, Interpol invited ICMP to work together with them to provide assistance, thus invoking for the first time an agreement signed between ICMP and Interpol in November 2007 to respond jointly to disaster situations.

== Mandate ==
ICMP works to secure the co-operation of governments and other authorities in locating persons missing as a result of armed conflicts, other hostilities or violations of human rights, and natural disasters. ICMP also supports the work of other organizations in their efforts, encourages public involvement in its activities, and contributes to the development of appropriate expressions of commemoration and tribute to the missing. In addition, ICMP assists governments in meeting their human rights obligations toward victims and their surviving family members, as well as building institutional capacity that promotes long-term public confidence.

== Structure ==
ICMP is governed by the ICMP Board of Commissioners, which includes the current chairman Thomas Miller (since May 2011), Alistair Burt, Her Majesty Queen Noor, Knut Vollebaek, Rolf Ekéus. Sanji Monageng, María Eugenia Brizuela de Ávila, Bert Koenders, and Dirk Brengelmann. Previous chairs include Cyrus Vance (Chairperson 1996–1997), Bob Dole (Chairperson 1997–2001), and Jim Kimsey (Chairperson 2001 – 2011).

The director-general, Kathryne Bomberger, was appointed by ICMP's Commissioners in April 2004 as the organization's chief executive officer and is responsible for the direction and oversight of all activities and programs in all areas of operation. On June 14, 2007, Bomberger was made Chevalier of the Legion d'Honneur by the president of France as "the proof of attention and recognition of the French government for the work of Kathryne Bomberger in her mission and exceptional achievements of ICMP".

Following ICMP's and Interpol's joint efforts on Typhoon Frank victim identification, on February 5, 2009, a presidential citation from Gloria Macapagal Arroyo, the President of the Republic of the Philippines, was given to Kathryne Bomberger, ICMP Director General, for "her exceptional commitment to and outstanding achievements in locating and identifying persons missing as a result of natural or human-induced disasters".

== Legal basis ==
Agreement on the status and functions of the International Commission on Missing Persons
- Signed: 15 December 2014
- Location: Brussels, Belgium
- Effective: 14 May 2015
- Condition: 2 ratifications
- Signatories: 5 (Belgium, Chile, Cyprus, El Salvador, Luxembourg, Netherlands, Serbia, Sweden, United Kingdom)
- Parties: Luxembourg, Netherlands, Sweden and United Kingdom
- Depositary: Government of the Netherlands
- Language: English

On 15 December 2014 the Agreement on the status and functions of the International Commission on Missing Persons was signed, providing the commission formally with international personality. The treaty was signed in Brussels by 5 countries. It came into force in 2015.

The treaty establishes The Hague as the seat of the commission and establishes a Conference of States Parties (representing all states party to the treaty), a Financial Committee (representing all contributing states), a "Board of Commissioners" (chosen "from among eminent persons") and a Director-General.

== See also ==
- DNA extraction
- DNA profiling
- Exhumation
- Human rights
- Open Society Institute
- United Nations Human Rights Council
