= Pamela L. Spratlen =

American diplomat

Pamela Spratlen
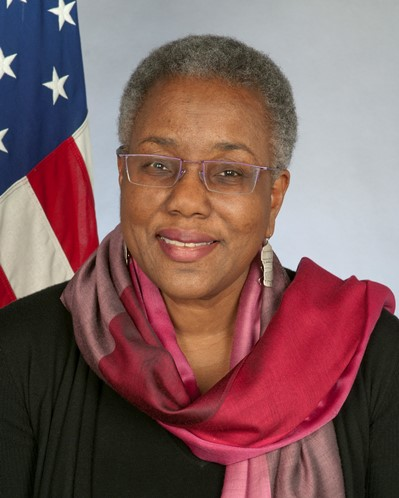

United States Ambassador to Uzbekistan
- In office January 27, 2015 – October 4, 2018
- President: Barack Obama; Donald Trump
- Deputy: Lesslie Viguerie
- Preceded by: George A. Krol
- Succeeded by: Daniel N. Rosenblum

United States Ambassador to Kyrgyzstan
- In office March 3, 2011 – December 12, 2014
- President: Barack Obama
- Preceded by: Tatiana C. Gfoeller
- Succeeded by: Sheila Gwaltney

Personal details
- Born: 1954 (age 71–72) Columbus, Ohio, U.S.
- Education: Wellesley College; United States Army War College; University of California, Berkeley

Pamela Leora Spratlen (born 1954) is a U.S. diplomat. She is the former United States Ambassador to Uzbekistan and United States Ambassador to Kyrgyzstan.

== Early life and education ==
Pamela Spratlen was born in Columbus, Ohio and was raised in Washington state and California. Her father, Thaddeus Spratlen, was a professor in the Department of Marketing at the University of Washington's School of Business. As a younger man, Thaddeus Spratlen also applied to join the Foreign Service, but was blocked by more racially restrictive hiring policies by the State Department at that time. Pamela Spratlen's mother, Lois Price Spratlen, was an associate professor and ombudsman at the University of Washington's School of Nursing.

Pamela Spratlen graduated from Crenshaw High School in Los Angeles in 1972. Spratlen earned her bachelor's degree from Wellesley College in 1976. She also has master's degrees from the United States Army War College and the University of California, Berkeley. Spratlen speaks Russian, French, and Spanish.

== Career ==
Prior to joining the Foreign Service, Spratlen volunteered for Volunteers in Service to America and served for almost nine years as a staff member in the California State Legislature.

Spratlen joined the Foreign Service in 1990. Her first tour as a Foreign Service Officer was in Guatemala (1990–1992). Her past assignments include the U.S. Mission to the Organization of American States (1992–1994), the U.S. Mission to the Organisation for Economic Co-operation and Development (1995–1998), and the Executive Secretariat (1999–2000). She has also served as Assistance Coordinator at the U.S. embassy in Moscow (2002–2004), Special Assistant to the Counselor of the Department of State (2005–2006), Director of Central Asian Affairs (2006–2007), Director of Western European Affairs (2007–2008), and Deputy Chief of Mission at the U.S. embassy in Astana, Kazakhstan. She served as the United States Ambassador to Kyrgyzstan from 2011 to 2014. Most recently, she was named as the Department of State's official overseeing the response to the so-called "Havana syndrome", but was replaced after being accused of failing to take the incidents seriously enough.

Spratlen was nominated by President Barack Obama on July 28, 2014, and confirmed by the Senate on November 20, 2014. She was sworn in as United States Ambassador to Uzbekistan on December 18, 2014.

Spratlen has received several Meritorious and Superior Honor Awards from the State Department.

== Personal life ==
One of Spratlen's sisters, Pat Spratlen Etem, was a member of the 1980 and 1984 Olympic rowing teams.

Diplomatic posts
Preceded by Tatiana Gfoeller	United States Ambassador to Kyrgyzstan; 2011–2014	Succeeded by Sheila Gwaltney
Preceded by George Krol	United States Ambassador to Uzbekistan; 2015–2018	Succeeded by Daniel N. Rosenblum
