= Bureau of Conflict and Stabilization Operations =

U.S. State Department division

- Seal of the United States Department of State

Bureau overview
- Formed: November 22, 2011
- Dissolved: July 11, 2025
- Headquarters: Washington, DC
- Employees: 160 (FY 2018)
- Annual budget: $12 million (FY 2018)
- Parent department: U.S. Department of State
- Website: state.gov/cso

The Bureau of Conflict and Stabilization Operations (CSO) was a bureau of the United States Department of State. The bureau was eliminated on July 11, 2025, as part of Secretary of State Marco Rubio's reorganziaton process of the department.

== Mission ==
CSO's mission was to anticipate, prevent, and respond to conflicts that undermine U.S. national interests. The bureau implemented this mission in two complementary ways: through data-driven analysis and forward deploying stabilization advisors to conflict zones. The objective was to inform and execute U.S. strategy, policy, and programs on conflict prevention and stabilization.

== Overview ==
The CSO's expertise focused on three key lines of effort: 1) political instability; 2) security sector stabilization; and 3) countering violent extremism (CVE). CSO collaborated with regional and functional bureaus, the Department of Defense, and USAID, and detailed stabilization advisors to posts and Geographic Combatant Commands (COCOMS) requiring specialized expertise.

== Core lines of effort ==
CSO focused on three lines of effort (LOE) reflecting different aspects of the conflict cycle, and with narrowed definitions, to deconflict with other agencies and bureaus.

Strategic prevention included deliberate efforts to reduce fragility, strengthen institutions, and increase cohesion in priority countries to disrupt likely pathways to violent conflict, instability, and/or political subversion. Bureau policy priorities were supporting the Global Fragility Act and early warning of atrocities, or EWA. Examples of how the bureau implemented strategic prevention include data analytics, atrocity early warning, stabilization planning, and preventing violent acts. Conflict resolution included negotiation, mediation, and diplomatic efforts to respond to conflict. Regional bureaus often lead U.S. efforts for peace negotiations, but CSO provided technical support. The bureau provided the reach-back capability for best practices and comparative examples and had programs to support peace processes, ceasefires, and conduct table-top exercises. Security sector stabilization was a true niche for CSO in the U.S. government, and included long-term reform efforts. The State Department's Bureau of International Narcotics and Law Enforcement Affairs (INL) worked only with official governments that had political will for security sector reform, and USAID generally could not work with security actors, so the bureau was working in a stabilization setting prior to INL.

Examples of the Bureau's work included analyzing and mitigating non-state armed groups, reintegrating former fighters or war veterans, and getting combatants off the battlefield. CSO efforts enabled the necessary, minimum security conditions to prepare for longer-term security sector reform.

Another example included disengaging and reintegrating former combatants, mapping non-state armed groups, and reintegrating other groups such as war veterans into society. For example, in Niger, CSO promoted defections of former fighters from Boko Haram and Islamic State-West Africa and their reintegration into society. The program helped remove former fighters from the battlefield and reduced the capacity of Boko Haram and ISIS-WA to threaten U.S. persons and interests. CSO reinforced this effort by deploying a Stabilization Advisor to the American Embassy in Niamey to assist the Government of Niger in establishing a legal framework and implementation plan for defectors.

The LOE were designed to add value and demonstrate how the bureau's efforts are separate but coordinated with other agencies and bureaus.

== History ==
The Department of State announced the creation of the bureau on November 22, 2011, replacing the Office of the Coordinator for Reconstruction and Stabilization.
