= Sheila Gwaltney =

American diplomat (born 1954)

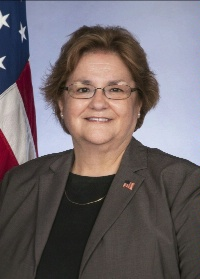
- Official portrait, 2015

United States Ambassador to Kyrgyzstan
- In office October 14, 2015 – August 2, 2017
- President: Barack Obama; Donald Trump
- Deputy: Alan Meltzer
- Preceded by: Pamela L. Spratlen
- Succeeded by: Donald Lu

Personal details
- Born: 1954 (age 71–72) Woodland, California, U.S.
- Education: University of California, Davis; George Washington University

Sheila S. Gwaltney (born 1954) is a retired U.S. diplomat.

== Early life and education ==
Gwaltney is from Woodland, California. Gwaltney earned a Bachelor of Arts in international relations at the University of California, Davis, and a Master's degree at George Washington University. Gwaltney speaks Russian, Ukrainian, and Spanish.

== Career ==
Gwaltney joined the Department of State in 1984. Her overseas assignments have included Panama, Pretoria, and St. Petersburg. At the Department of State in Washington, D.C., she has also served as Deputy Director for the Office of Russian Affairs, Special Assistant to the Under Secretary of State for Political Affairs, and Director of Country Affairs for Eurasia. During her Foreign Service career, Gwaltney also spent one year at the Hoover Institution at Stanford University as a National Security Affairs Fellow. She has also served as the Deputy Chief of Mission at the U.S. embassies in Bishkek (1999–2001), Kyiv (2004–2007), and Moscow (2011–2014).

On August 28, 2014, President Barack Obama nominated Gwaltney to be the United States Ambassador to Kyrgyzstan. She was confirmed by the Senate about a year later, on August 5, 2015. She retired from that post in August 2017.

Gwaltney is the recipient of several Department of State Superior and Meritorious Honor Awards.

Diplomatic posts
Preceded by Pamela Spratlen	United States Ambassador to Kyrgyzstan; 2015–2017	Succeeded by Donald Lu
