= Cypher No. I-0678 =

2022 US and Pakistani political affair

A diplomatic incident later known as Lettergate began in March 2022 when Pakistan prime minister Imran Khan alleged that a diplomatic telegram (Cypher No. I-0678) was sent by then Pakistani ambassador to United States Asad Majeed Khan to the Ministry of Foreign Affairs based on the notes taken by a note-taker from the embassy of Pakistan based in Washington, D.C. The telegram allegedly stated that in the course of the meeting, the United States had expressed a desire to the government of Pakistan for Prime Minister Imran Khan to be removed from office because of his neutral stance on the war between Russia and Ukraine and refusal to back the Ukrainians, promising warmer relations if Pakistan agrees while threatening isolation if it does not. The lunch was attended by US officials including then US assistant secretary of state for South and Central Asian affairs Donald Lu and Deputy Assistant Secretary Lesslie Viguerie. The Pakistani diplomats attending the lunch meeting included Deputy Chief of Mission Syed Naveed Bokhari and the defence attaché.

The meeting was deemed a "blatant interference" by the 37th National Security Council of Pakistan and resulted in a strong démarche to the US chargé d'affaires. The 38th National Security Council reaffirmed the previous council's assessment but deemed that "no evidence of any foreign conspiracy" was found. Former prime minister of Pakistan Imran Khan alleged that the events of the meeting were an attempt to influence his foreign policy, and the content of the letter confirmed a conspiracy to remove him from office through a parliamentary vote of no confidence in favor of the members of the Pakistan Democratic Movement. He also alleged that the letter stated that if the vote of no confidence failed, Pakistan would face dire consequences. The US Spokesperson for the Department of State, Ned Price, denied the allegations, saying "there is absolutely no truth to that allegation."

On 10 May, the 23rd prime minister of Pakistan, Shehbaz Sharif, and the 11th and 14th president of Pakistan, Asif Ali Zardari, addressed the National Assembly and acknowledged the letter was genuine, but said there was no conspiracy.

== Timeline ==
- 27 March 2022: In a speech at Parade Ground in Islamabad, then-Prime Minister Imran Khan removed a document from his pocket and waved it to the crowd and media crew. He said that "attempts are being made to influence our foreign policy from abroad. We have been aware of this conspiracy for months". He further stated that "attempts are being made through foreign money to change the government in Pakistan". PM Khan revealed that "we have been threatened in writing, but we will not compromise on national interest. The letter I have is proof, and I want to dare anyone who is doubting this letter". PM Khan claimed that Nawaz Sharif and Shehbaz Sharif, leaders of the Pakistan Muslim League, and Asif Ali Zardari, president of the Pakistan People's Party, were also part of the conspiracy.
- 30 March 2022: Islamabad High Court Chief Justice Athar Minallah disposed of a petition that sought a restraining order on PM Khan from disclosing the contents of the confidential letter. The court stated that it "is confident that as an elected prime minister he would not disclose any information or act in breach of Section 5 of the Official Secrets Act, 1923, nor the oath taken by him under the Constitution".
- 31 March 2022: Pakistan's National Security Advisor Moeed Yusuf briefed a meeting held by the National Security Committee (NSC) that was chaired by PM Khan. Following which the Prime Minister's Office (PMO) issued a statement saying that "the committee expressed grave concern at the communication, terming the language used by the foreign official as undiplomatic" and called it a "blatant interference in the internal affairs of Pakistan by the country in question". The NSC decided that Pakistan will issue "a strong demarche to the country in question both in Islamabad and in the country's capital through a proper channel in keeping with diplomatic norms," according to the PMO statement. Later in the day, the Foreign Office of Pakistan summoned an official of the United States embassy and handed over the requisite demarches.
- 3 April 2022: In a meeting with Ambassador Asad Majeed Khan, PM Khan stated that US Assistant Secretary of State for South and Central Asian Affairs Donald Lu warned there could be implications if he survived the opposition's no-confidence motion.
- 22 April 2022: National Security Council meeting convened by Prime Minister Shehbaz Sharif "quietly agrees" with the claim made in the last communiqué that the US interfered in Pakistan's internal affairs. Per the statement released to the public, the participants endorsed the decisions from the last NSC meeting under Prime Minister Imran Khan.
- 2 May 2022: Khan asked US president Joe Biden, "by indulging in a regime change conspiracy to remove a democratically elected PM of a country of over 220 (million) people to bring in a puppet PM, do you think you have lessened or increased anti-American sentiment in Pakistan?"
- 23 May 2022: Khan suggested that US State Department official Donald Lu be fired for interfering with Pakistan's domestic politics and "for bad manners and sheer arrogance." Khan added, "I had a perfectly good relationship with the Trump administration. It's only when the Biden administration came, and it coincided with what was happening in Afghanistan. And for some reason, which I still don't know, they never got in touch with me."
- 2 Oct 2022: Federal cabinet of Shehbaz Sharif releases cabinet summary mentioning the cipher number, date, and annexure. An ex-ambassador explained to The Express Tribune that Sharif's cabinet may have breached the Official Secrets Act by including the date and reference number of the diplomatic cipher in a summary, because if these particulars were cited, then it implies the entire cabinet was privy to it.
- 9 Aug 2023: The night Pakistan's parliament was dissolved by PM Shehbaz Sharif and President Arif Alvi, US journal The Intercept published a transcript leak of the Cypher. It matched all the allegations Khan had on the US administration. The contents show undiplomatic language, threats between the lines, and a vote of no-confidence against PM Imran Khan. The basis of all conversation seemed to be that the US was unhappy with Khan's visit to Moscow. The leaked document caused an uproar on social media platform X in Pakistan. The article was allegedly also blocked from Pakistani mainstream media. Screenshots of WhatsApp groups were also seen on X showing orders not to discuss the article on mainstream media.
- 3 June 2024: The Islamabad High Court (IHC) acquitted PTI founder Imran Khan and former foreign minister Shah Mahmood Qureshi in the cipher case.
- 17 May 2026: Drop Site News released the original cypher on X, formerly Twitter.

== Contents of the letter ==
The complete contents of the letter are protected under Section 5 of Pakistan's Official Secrets Act, 1923 and have not been disclosed. However, selected components have been spoken about through various interviews, speeches and public statements.

The former Prime Minister Imran Khan and members of his cabinet said that the letter demanded his removal and, if Khan remained the prime minister, it would lead to horrific consequences.

It also said that "if the no-confidence vote against the prime minister succeeds, all will be forgiven in Washington", a reference to Pakistan's stance on the Russia-Ukraine war.

On 10 May 2022, the Prime Minister of Pakistan, Shehbaz Sharif addressed the National Assembly and acknowledged the letter was threatening, but said the notes did not involve a conspiracy or treason.

On 9 August 2023, the alleged cypher was published in full by The Intercept.

== Calls for judicial commission and investigation ==
On 29 March 2022, the Minister for Planning, Development, and Special Initiatives, Asad Umar, said Prime Minister Khan would share the letter with the Chief Justice of Pakistan, Umar Ata Bandial. The PTI government urged the Chief Justice to set up an independent judicial commission to investigate the letter. The Chief Justice received the letter, but did not comment or form any commission.

The PTI government also turned to retired lieutenant general Tariq Khan to head a separate commission to investigate the letter. However, the commission failed to form, as Khan claimed the army warned him not to be politicized, and there was not enough time to properly investigate under the current government. In an open letter, Khan wrote, "I have no connections with any politicians or political party, am known to be apolitical...I was more than willing to undertake this task," however "it appeared that the Government would not last for more than a day or two" so he could not continue.

On 6 May 2022, the newly formed PDM government announced the formation of a probe to investigate the alleged foreign conspiracy. This was rejected in a press conference by former Minister of Information Fawad Chaudry, who reiterated that they "will only consider commission formed under [an] independent judiciary which will have an open hearing." The PTI members "questioned how the FIA, which is under Shehbaz Sharif, can hold a probe into the cipher" and any probe by this government would be biased as they were the beneficiaries of the alleged conspiracy.

The former Prime Minister Khan, in separate letters written to the President of Pakistan and Chief Justice on 30 April 2022, again urged the formation of an independent Judicial Commission.

On 10 May 2022, in a public statement, President Arif Alvi verified the contents of the letter and urged Chief Justice Umar Bandial to hold an open hearing. He "underscored that threats could both be covert and overt and in this particular case, it was clearly communicated through undiplomatic and informal language."

== Lawsuit ==
In August 2023, Federal Investigation Agency (FIA) filed a first information report (FIR) under the Official Secrets Act against former Prime Minister Imran Khan and Shah Mahmood Qureshi. The FIR alleged that both improperly communicated information from a classified document – a cipher telegram received from Washington on 7 March 2022 – to unauthorized people and compromised state security.

Subsequently, a special court was established to conduct in-camera hearings for cases under the Official Secrets Act. By October 2023, both were formally indicted, with charges stating that Khan had unlawfully retained and disseminated the classified information. In November 2023, the Islamabad High Court declared the proceedings illegal, requiring the trial to restart. The special court reindicted both in December 2023.

On 22 December, the Supreme Court granted post-arrest bail to Imran Khan and Shah Mahmood Qureshi on surety bonds of Rs 1 million each. The court cited insufficient evidence to prove that Khan had disclosed the information to the public or foreign entities and noted that the information did not pertain to defense matters. However, the court acknowledged the need for further investigation, deferring the final determination to the trial court after evidence was reviewed.

Despite the bail, Khan remained detained due to other ongoing cases, and Qureshi faced delays in his release due to his indictment in the May 9 riots case. On 28 December 2023, the Islamabad High Court issued a stay order on the in-camera proceedings, citing legal errors. This stay was lifted on 11 January 2024, after assurances were made to record witness statements anew.

By 18 January 2024, statements from five witnesses, including former principal secretary Azam Khan, had been recorded. The trial faced challenges, including the absence of lead counsel for Khan and claims of partiality in the judicial process.

On 30 January 2024, a special court sentenced Imran Khan and Shah Mahmood Qureshi to ten years in prison in the cipher case. The trial was held behind closed-doors and multiple observers questioned the fairness of the trial process. Subsequently, both filed an appeal in the Islamabad High Court and, in June 2024, the high court acquitted both in the cypher case and order their release from prison.

== See also ==
- Pakistan–United States relations
- Anti-American sentiment in Pakistan
- List of -gate scandals and controversies
