= Edward Hurwitz =

American diplomat (1931–2025)

1st United States Ambassador to Kyrgyzstan
- In office September 17, 1992 – October 11, 1994
- President: George H. W. Bush; Bill Clinton
- Preceded by: Diplomatic relations established
- Succeeded by: Eileen A. Malloy

United States Ambassador to Afghanistan
- Acting, as chargé d'affaires
- In office June 1983 – March 1986
- President: Ronald Reagan
- Preceded by: Hawthorne Q. Mills (Acting)
- Succeeded by: James Maurice Ealum (Acting)

Personal details
- Born: March 21, 1931 New York City, U.S.
- Died: August 20, 2025 (aged 94) Rockville, Maryland, U.S.
- Profession: Diplomat, Career Ambassador

Edward Hurwitz (March 21, 1931 – August 20, 2025) was an American diplomat. From 1983 to 1986 he was the U.S. chargé d'affaires in Afghanistan, and he served as the first U.S. ambassador to Kyrgyzstan, from 1992 to 1994.

Hurwitz' four-decade career in the U.S. Foreign Service focused primarily on Soviet affairs, East Asia, and emerging post-Soviet states. He spoke Korean and Russian and served in high-profile roles during pivotal moments of the Cold War and its aftermath.

== Early life ==
Hurwitz was born in New York City on March 21, 1931. His father, the son of a Lithuanian-Jewish immigrant who arrived in the United States in 1885 to escape czarist military service. He operated a hardware store in Queens that prospered during the Great Depression and after World War II by catering to do-it-yourself customers. His mother immigrated from Romania at age three in 1903. Hurwitz attended Jamaica High School in Jamaica, Queens. He won a New York state scholarship to attend Cornell University, where he majored in government, completing an A.B. degree in 1952.

== Military service ==
Facing the draft during the Korean War in 1952, Hurwitz served in the U.S. Army from May 1953 to May 1955. After basic training at Camp Breckinridge in Kentucky, he was selected for the Counter Intelligence Corps (CIC) based on his Russian studies at Cornell. At CIC school in Fort Holabird in Maryland, he trained in interrogation and investigations before being stationed in Tokyo, Japan for a year where he monitored Soviet mission activities and efforts to repatriate Russian émigrés from places like Harbin, China. After his discharge from the Army in Fall 1955, he enrolled in Harvard University's Russian Institute on the G.I. Bill, intending to earn a master's degree. Hurwitz left after one semester to pursue the Foreign Service exam, which he passed in 1955.

== Foreign Service career ==
Hurwitz joined the U.S. Foreign Service in September 1956 after completing orientation at the Foreign Service Institute. Over the next 40 years, he held a series of analytical and operational roles, often in challenging postings related to the Soviet Union, Korea, and Central Asia. First assigned to the Bureau of Intelligence and Research, the Soviet internal affairs section, Hurwitz analyzed Soviet economics. He then served as staff aide to Ambassador Llewellyn Thompson in Moscow.

Hurwitz studied Korean language at Yale University (1960-61) and Yangtze University in Korea (1961–62), supplementing with private lessons. From 1962-66, he served as political officer in Seoul under Ambassadors Samuel D. Berger and Winthrop Brown. Returning to Washington, D.C., from 1966–68 he analyzed Chinese involvement in Vietnam, then shifted to the Soviet Far East desk (1968–69) where he monitored Sino-Soviet. In Moscow again 1969-72 Hurwitz headed up the political section at the U.S. embassy under Ambassador Jacob Beam. From 1972-74 he was desk officer back home for Czechoslovakia and Bulgaria, plus the Baltic states.

Under Ambassador Dick Sneider in Seoul from 1974-75, Hurwitz served as political counselor. For the next few years he served from Washington in various roles, including as deputy chief of the Combating Terrorism Office, as Korean country director, and as Australian/New Zealand director, with a severe back problem hospitalized him for much of 1978. From 1979-82 he was Deputy Director for Exchanges on the Soviet desk, in the post-Afghanistan invasion period negotiating agreements for the 1980 Olympics (later boycotted).

As Chargé d'Affaires ad Interim in Kabul, Afghanistan from 1983-86, after Dari language training, Hurwitz led a small embassy during the Soviet-Afghan War. He assessed Soviet entrenchment and Mujahideen disunity and handled defections and complaints to the Soviets (the embassy closed in 1987 after his departure). From 1986-88 he was Consul General in Leningrad (now St. Petersburg) during the opening up of the Soviet Union under Mikhail Gorbachev. From 1988-91 he served as Director, Office of Research and Analysis for Soviet Union and Eastern Europe, back in Washington during the critical time of perestroika, abandonment of the Brezhnev Doctrine in Eastern Europe, the 1991 Soviet coup attempt, and full dissolution of the Soviet Union.

In 1992 he was Chargé d'Affaires in Bishkek, Kyrgyzstan then first U.S. ambassador to the newly independent Kyrgyzstan (confirmed August 6, 1992) meeting with President Askar Akayev regularly on U.S. aid, border issues, drug trafficking, and influences from Russia, Iran, and China.

Hurwitz reviewed declassified documents on U.S.-Afghanistan and U.S.-Soviet relations for the Foreign Relations of the United States series from 1994 until his retirement from the Foreign Service in March 1996 at age 65. He remained engaged with diplomatic history, as evidenced by references to his commentary on memoirs like Thomas Buchanan's Mossy Memoir of a Rolling Stone in the Foreign Service Journal (2012).

== Personal life ==
While serving in Moscow, Russia, Hurwitz married Kari Gundersen, daughter of the Norwegian ambassador to Russia at the time, Oscar Christian Gundersen. They had two children together. He married German economist Inge Kaul in 1987 in Brooklyn, New York, remaining together until her death in 2023.

Hurwitz died in Rockville, Maryland on August 20, 2025, at the age of 94.

== Sources ==
- Office of the Historian, Shared Knowledge Services, Bureau of Administration; United States Department of State: Edward Hurwitz (1931-)
- The American Presidency Project: Nomination of Edward Hurwitz To Be United States Ambassador to Kyrgyzstan; May 28, 1992
- U.S. Library of Congress: Interview with Edward Hurwitz The Association for Diplomatic Studies and Training Foreign Affairs Oral History Project — AMBASSADOR EDWARD HURWITZ, Interviewed by: Charles Stuart Kennedy; Initial interview date: August 15, 1996
