= List of consular districts of the United States =

The following is a list of the consular districts of the United States. Such districts are designated by the Secretary of State as per Section 312(c) of the Foreign Service Act of 1980 (22 U.S.C. 3952(c)).

== List ==
=== Abbreviations ===
- (E) Embassy;
- (CG) Consulate general;
- (C) Consulate;
- (BO) Branch office of embassy
- (USINT) U.S. interests section - provides De facto embassy services to a country with which the United States does not have official diplomatic relations
- (M) Mission
- (CA) Consular Agencies - provides emergency consular services

=== Bureau of African Affairs (AF) ===
Country	Post	Consular District
Angola	Luanda (E)	All of Angola
Benin	Cotonou (E)	All of Benin
Botswana	Gaborone (E)	All of Botswana
British Indian Ocean Territory (Diego Garcia), Reunion		
Burkina Faso	Ouagadougou (E)	All of Burkina Faso
Burundi	Bujumbura (E)	All of Burundi
Cameroon	Yaoundé (E)	All of Cameroon and American Citizen Services (ACS) and visa services for the Central African Republic
Cameroon	Douala (BO)	Limited ACS are offered in Douala.
Cape Verde	Praia (E)	All of Cabo Verde
Central African Republic	Bangui (E)	Limited ACS for the Central African Republic
Chad	N'Djamena (E)	All of Chad
Comoros	Antananarivo (E)	Ambassador resident in Madagascar. Amembassy Moroni was closed in 1993. There is a U.S. citizen, Citizen Liaison Volunteer resident in Moroni.
Democratic Republic of Congo	Kinshasa (E)	All of Democratic Republic of Congo
Djibouti	Djibouti City (E)	All of Djibouti
Equatorial Guinea	Malabo (E)	Bioko; some ACS on the continent may be provided by either Douala or Yaoundé, Cameroon.
Eritrea	Asmara (E)	Consular Section closed June 2012
Ethiopia	Addis Ababa (E)	All of Ethiopia and ACS and visa services for Eritrea
Eswatini	Mbabane (E)	All of Eswatini
Gabon	Libreville (E)	All of Gabon and São Tomé and Príncipe
Ghana	Accra (E)	All of Ghana
Guinea	Conakry (E)	All of Guinea
Guinea-Bissau	Dakar (E)	Embassy Bissau operations were suspended in 1998. Services are provided by Embassy Dakar.
Ivory Coast	Abidjan (E)	All of Ivory Coast
Kenya	Nairobi (E)	All of Kenya, Puntland, and Somalia, and ACS and visa services for Eritrea and South Sudan (except A and G visas)
Lesotho	Maseru (E)	All of Lesotho
Liberia	Monrovia (E)	All of Liberia
Madagascar	Antananarivo (E)	All of Madagascar, Comoros, and the French Collectivity of Mayotte
Malawi	Lilongwe (E)	All of Malawi
Mali	Bamako (E)	All of Mali
Mauritania	Nouakchott (E)	All of Mauritania
Mauritius	Port Louis (E)	All of Mauritius, islands of Rodrigues and Reunion, and Seychelles
Mozambique	Maputo (E)	All of Mozambique
Namibia	Windhoek (E)	All of Namibia
Niger	Niamey (E)	All of Niger
Nigeria	Abuja (E)	Middle belt and northern part of Nigeria: Adamawa, Bauchi, Borno, Gombe, Tarabe, and Yobe; Sokoto, Kebbi, Katsina, Kano, Kaduna, Jigawa, and Zamfara;Benue, Federal Capital Territory [of Abuja], Kogi, Kwara, Nassarawa, Niger, and Plateau
Nigeria	Lagos (CG)	Southern part of Nigeria: Ekiti, Lagos, Ogun, Ondo, Osun, and Oyo; Abia, Anambra, Ebonyi, Enugu, and Imo; Akwa Ibom, Bayelsa, Cross River, Delta, Edo, and Rivers
Republic of Congo	Brazzaville (E)	All of Republic of Congo
Rwanda	Kigali (E)	All of Rwanda
São Tomé and Príncipe	Libreville (E)	Ambassador resident in Gabon.
Senegal	Dakar (E)	All of Senegal and Guinea-Bissau
Seychelles	Port Louis (E)	Ambassador resident in Mauritius. AmEmbassy Victoria was closed in 1996, but a U.S. consular agent remains in Victoria.
Sierra Leone	Freetown (E)	All of Sierra Leone
Somalia	Nairobi (E)	Embassy Mogadishu was reopened in 2018 but consular services continue to be provided by Embassy Nairobi
South Africa	Pretoria (E)	Covered by Johannesburg
South Africa	Cape Town (CG)	Western Cape, Eastern Cape, and Northern Cape provinces. St. Helena and dependencies
South Africa	Durban (CG)	Kwazulu-Natal province
South Africa	Johannesburg (CG)	Pretoria area and the Gauteng, Mpumalanga, Limpopo, North West, and Free State provinces
Sudan	Khartoum (E)	All of Sudan
South Sudan	Juba (CG)	Limited Visa Services and ACS.
Tanzania	Dar es Salaam (E)	All of Tanzania, including Zanzibar
The Gambia	Banjul (E)	All of The Gambia
Togo	Lome (E)	All of Togo
Uganda	Kampala (E)	All of Uganda
Zambia	Lusaka (E)	All of Zambia
Zimbabwe	Harare (E)	All of Zimbabwe

=== Bureau of East Asian and Pacific Affairs (EAP) ===
Country	Post	Consular District
Australia	Canberra (E)	Covered by Sydney
Australia	Melbourne (CG)	Victoria, South Australia, Tasmania, Northern Territory
Australia	Perth (C)	Western Australia
Australia	Sydney (CG)	New South Wales, Australian Capital Territory, Queensland, Norfolk Island, Canberra
Brunei	Bandar Seri Begawan (E)	Brunei
Burma	Rangoon (E)	Burma
Cambodia	Phnom Penh (E)	Cambodia
China	Beijing (E)	Beijing Municipality, Gansu, Hebei, Hunan, Inner Mongolia, Ningxia, Qinghai, Shaanxi, Shandong, Shanxi, Tianjin Municipality, Xinjiang
China	Chengdu (CG)	Chongqing Municipality, Guizhou, Sichuan, Tibet, Yunnan
China	Guangzhou (CG)	Fujian, Guangdong, Guangxi, Hainan
China	Hong Kong (CG)	Hong Kong SAR (special administrative region) and Macau SAR
China	Shanghai (CG)	Anhui, Jiangsu, Shanghai Municipality, Zhejiang
China	Shenyang (CG)	Heilongjiang, Jilin, Liaoning
China	Wuhan (C)	Henan, Hubei, Hunan, Jiangxi NOTE: Beijing will handle nonemergency ACS and visa services until Wuhan has the staff and facilities to do so.
Fiji	Suva (E)	Fiji, Kiribati, Nauru, Tonga, Tuvalu, French Polynesia, New Caledonia, Wallis and Futuna
Indonesia	Jakarta (E)	West Java, Central Java, Papua, Kalimantan (Indonesian Borneo), and the special districts of Jakarta and Jogjakarta
Indonesia	Medan (C)	Sumatra and neighboring islands including Bangka Belitung, Batam and Mentawai chain. Limited ACS, emergency services only.
Indonesia	Surabaya (CG)	East Java, islands of Sulawesi, Bali, Lombok, and all of West and East Nusa Tenggara (to include Sumba, Sumbawa, Flores, West Timor), as well as the islands of Maluku
Japan	Tokyo (E)	Tokyo, Chiba, Fukushima, Gunma, Ibaraki, Kanagawa, Nagano, Niigata, Saitama, Shizuoka, Tochigi, Yamagata, and Yamanashi
Japan	Fukuoka (C)	Fukuoka, Kagoshima to the Island of Yakushima, Kumamoto, Miyazaki, Nagasaki, Oita, Saga, and Yamaguchi
Japan	Nagoya (C)	Aichi, Gifu, Mie NOTE: Consulate Nagoya has reporting responsibilities for these 3 prefectures and provides emergency American citizen services (ACS). Osaka staff covers routine ACS in Nagoya through monthly visits (by appointment) or at CG Osaka-Kobe.
Japan	Naha (CG)	Okinawa, the Amami Oshima Island group (which is the Southern part of Kagoshima Prefecture)
Japan	Osaka/Kobe (CG)	Osaka, Aichi, Ehime, Fukui, Gifu, Hiroshima, Hyogo, Ishikawa, Kagawa, Kochi, Kyoto, Mie, Nara, Okayama, Shimane, Shiga, Tokushima, Tottori, Toyama, Wakayama
Japan	Sapporo (CG)	Akita, Aomori, Hokkaido, Iwate, and Miyagi
Laos	Vientiane (E)	Laos
Malaysia	Kuala Lumpur (E)	Malaysia
Marshall Islands	Majuro (E)	Marshall Islands
Micronesia	Kolonia (E)	Micronesia
Mongolia	Ulaanbaatar (E)	Mongolia
New Zealand	Wellington (E)	Covered by Auckland
New Zealand	Auckland (CG)	All of New Zealand, the Cook Islands, Niue, Samoa, and Pitcairn Islands
Palau	Koror (E)	Palau
Papua New Guinea	Port Moresby (E)	Papua New Guinea and Solomon Islands and Vanuatu
Philippines	Manila (E)	Philippines
Singapore	Singapore (E)	Singapore and British Indian Ocean Territory (Diego Garcia)
South Korea	Seoul (E)	All other parts of South Korea that APP Busan does not cover
South Korea	Busan (C)	South Kyungsang Province, North Kyungsang Province, Cheju Island. Limited ACS.
Taiwan	Taipei, American Institute in Taipei (AIT)	Taipei, Keelung (Jilong), Taoyuan, Xinzhu, Miaoli, Taizhong, Zhanghua, Nantou, Hualian, Yilan, Yunlin Anomaly: Jinmen and Mazu. The Taiwan Relations Act defines “Taiwan” as consisting of the island of Taiwan and the Pescadores (Penghu). This U.S. statutory definition of Taiwan omits mention of the Taiwan-held Fujianese islands of Jinmen (Kinmen, Quemoy) and Mazu (Matsu). It therefore appears that AIT officers are not authorized under the TRA or 1997 designations by the Secretary and A/S to perform notarial acts or to execute U.S. passport or visa laws on the islands of Jinmen or Mazu, and that U.S. citizens born there cannot elect “Taiwan” as the place of birth on their passports.
Taiwan	Kaohsiung (BO)	Jiayi, Tainan, Kaohsiung, Pingdong, Taidong, Penghu
Thailand	Bangkok (E)	The rest of Thailand
Thailand	Chiang Mai (CG)	Chiang Mai, Chiang Rai, Kamphaengphet, Lampang, Lamphun, Mae Hong Son, Nan, Petchabun, Phayao, Phichit, Phitsanulok, Phrae, Sukhothai, Tak, and Uttaradit
Timor-Leste	Dili (E)	ACS only; Timorese seeking visas must go to U.S. Embassy Jakarta.
Vietnam	Hanoi (E)	Quang Tri and all points northward.
Vietnam	Ho Chi Minh City (CG)	Thua Thien Hue and all points southward. However, the Government of Viet Nam requires advance notice and approval before commencing an official visit to any of the following 11 provinces: Kon Tum, Gia Lai, Dac Lac, Dac Nong, Lam Dong, Binh Phuoc, Tay Ninh, Dong Thap, An Giang, Soc Trang, and Kien Giang
Western Samoa	Apia (E)	All of Samoa, limited ACS (ACS).

=== Bureau of European and Eurasian Affairs (EUR) ===
Country	Post	Consular District
Albania	Tirana (E)	Albania
Armenia	Yerevan (E)	Armenia
Austria	Vienna (E)	Austria
Azerbaijan	Baku (E)	Azerbaijan
Belarus	Minsk (E)	Belarus
Belgium	Brussels (E)	Belgium
Bermuda	Hamilton (CG)	Bermuda
Bosnia-Herzegovina	Sarajevo (E)	Bosnia-Herzegovina
Bulgaria	Sofia (E)	Bulgaria
Croatia	Zagreb (E)	Croatia
Cyprus	Nicosia (E)	Cyprus
Czech Republic	Prague (E)	Czech Republic
Denmark	Copenhagen (E)	Denmark
Estonia	Tallinn (E)	Estonia
Finland	Helsinki (E)	Finland
France	Paris (E)	All parts of France for ACS, except as shown for Consulate Strasbourg, Consulate General Marseille, and for the posts outside France handling French Overseas Departments and Territories and all parts of France and Monaco for visas, except for the posts outside France handling French Overseas Departments and Territories.
France	Marseille (CG)	All ACS for Midi-Pyrénées, Languedoc-Roussillon, Provence, Côte d’Azur, and Corsica; CG Marseille also handles ACS matters for Monaco.
France	Strasbourg (C)	ACS for Lorraine, Franche-Comté, and Alsace, although applications for passports and birth reports are forwarded to Paris for completion.
Georgia	Tbilisi (E)	Georgia
Germany	Berlin (E)	All of northern Germany from the Dutch border in the west to the Polish border in the east, as well as all of the former DDR: Berlin, Brandenburg, Saxony, Saxony-Anhalt, Thuringia, Lower Saxony, Bremen, Hamburg, Schleswig-Holstein, and Mecklenburg-Vorpommern.
Germany	Düsseldorf (CG)	None
Germany	Frankfurt (CG)	Nord-Rhein Westfallen (NRW), Hessen, Saarland, Rheinland-Pfalz, and Baden-Württemberg
Germany	Hamburg (CG)	None
Germany	Munich (CG)	Bavaria
Greece	Athens (E)	All other nomarchies (states) and islands of Greece
Greece	Thessaloniki (CG)	Evros, Rodopi, Xanthi, Drama, Serres, Kavala, Kilkis, Pella, Imathia, Thessaloniki, Chalkidiki, Pieria, Florina, Kastoria, Kozani, Grevena, Larissa, Trikala, Karditsa, the islands of Thassos and Samothrace
Hungary	Budapest (E)	Hungary
Iceland	Reykjavík (E)	Iceland
Ireland	Dublin (E)	Republic of Ireland
Italy	Rome (E)	Ancona, Abruzzo, Ascoli Piceno, Cagliari, Carbonia-Iglesias, Chieti, Frosinone, l’Aquila, Latina, Lazio, Macerata, Marche, Medio-Campidano, Nuoro, Olbia-Tempio, Ogliastra, Oristano, Perugia, Pesaro-Urbino, Umbria, Urbino, Pescara, Rieti, Roma, Sassari, Sardegna, Teramo, Terni, Viterbo
Italy	Florence (CG)	Arezzo, Bologna, Ferrara, Firenze, Forli, Grosseto, Livorno, Lucca, Massa Carrara, Modena, Pisa, Pistoia, Prato, Ravenna, Reggio Emilia, Republic of San Marino, Rimini, Siena
Italy	Milan (CG)	Alessandria, Aosta, Asti, Belluno, Bergamo, Biella, Bolzano, Brescia, Como, Cremona, Cuneo, Friuli-Venezia Giulia, Genoa, Gorizia, Imperia, La Spezia, Lecco, Liguria, Lodi, Lombardia, Mantova, Milan, Novara, Padua, Parma, Pavia, Piacenza, Piemonte, Pordenone, Rovigo, Savona, Sondrio, Trentino-Alto Adige, Trento, Treviso, Trieste, Turin, Udine, Valle D'Aosta, Varese, Veneto, Venezia, Verbania, Vercelli, Verona, Vicenza
Italy	Naples (CG)	Agrigento, Avellino, Bari, Basilicata, Benevento, Brindisi, Calabria, Caltanissetta, Campania, Campobasso, Caserta, Catania, Catanzaro, Cosenza, Crotone, Enna, Foggia, Isernia, Lecce, Matera, Messina, Molise, Naples, Palermo, Potenza, Puglia, Ragusa, Reggio Calabria, Salerno, Sicilia, Syracuse, Taranto, Trapani, Vibo Valentia
Kosovo	Pristina (E)	Kosovo
Latvia	Riga (E)	Latvia
Lithuania	Vilnius (E)	Lithuania
Luxembourg	Luxembourg (E)	Luxembourg
Malta	Valletta (E)	Malta
Moldova	Chișinău (E)	Moldova
Montenegro	Podgorica (E)	All of Montenegro for ACS and nonimmigrant visas. Immigrant visas for Montenegro are conducted in Belgrade..
Netherlands	Amsterdam (CG)	Netherlands
North Macedonia	Skopje (E)	North Macedonia
Norway	Oslo (E)	Norway
Poland	Warsaw (E)	Masovian, West Pomeranian, Pomeranian, Kuyavian-Pomeranian, Warmian-Masurian, Podlaskie, Lubusz, Greater Poland, Łódź, Lublin
Poland	Kraków (CG)	Lower Silesian, Opole, Silesian, Lesser Poland, Subcarpathian, and Holy Cross
Poland	Poznaň (CA)	ACS assistance in western Poland
Portugal	Lisbon (E)	Portugal (including the Madeira Islands) except for the Azores
Portugal	Ponta Delgada (C)	Azores
Romania	Bucharest (E)	Romania
Russia	Moscow (E)	All areas of Russia not covered in the following lists
Russia	Saint Petersburg (CG)	Republic of Kareliya; Leningrad Oblast; Vologda Oblast; Pskov Oblast; Novgorod Oblast; Arkhangelsk Oblast; Murmansk Oblast; Kaliningrad Oblast; the Nenetskiy Autonomous Okrug; and the City of Saint Petersburg
Russia	Vladivostok (CG)	Republic of Sakha; the Chukotskiy Autonomous Okrug; the Yevreyskaya Autonomous Oblast; Sakhalin Oblast; Koryakskiy Autonomous Okrug; Magadan Oblast; Amur Krai; Kamchatka Oblast; Khabarovsk Krai; and Primorsky Krai
Russia	Yekaterinburg (CG)	Republic of Bashkortostan; Chelyabinsk Oblast; the Khanty-Mansiyskiy Autonomous Okrug; the Perm Krai; Kurgan Oblast; Omsk Oblast; Orenburg Oblast; Sverdlovsk Oblast; Tyumen Oblast; the Republic of Udmurtiya; and the Yamalo-Nenetskiy Autonomous Okrug
Serbia	Belgrade (E)	Serbia and Montenegro for visa services
Slovakia	Bratislava (E)	Slovakia
Slovenia	Ljubljana (E)	Slovenia
Spain	Madrid (E)	The remainder of Spain
Spain	Barcelona (CG)	Andorra, Aragon (the provinces of Huesca, Zaragoza, Teruel), Cataluna (the provinces of Barcelona, Girona, Lleida, Tarragona)
Sweden	Stockholm (E)	Sweden
Switzerland	Bern (E)	Switzerland, Liechtenstein, and support for Amcits in Iran
Turkey	Ankara (E)	Afyon, Ağrı, Aksaray, Amasya, Ankara, Antalya, Ardahan, Artvin, Bartin, Bayburt, Burdur, Çankırı, Çorum, Erzincan, Erzurum, Eskişehir, Giresun, Gümüşhane, Iğdır, Isparta, Karabük, Karaman, Kars, Kastamonu, Kayseri, Kırıkkale, Kırşehir, Konya, Kütahya, Nevşehir, Niğde, Ordu, Rize, Samsun, Sinop, Sivas, Tokat, Trabzon, Yozgat, Zonguldak
Turkey	Adana (C)	Adana, Adıyaman, Batman, Bingöl, Bitlis, Diyarbakır, Elazığ, Gaziantep, Hakkâri, Hatay, Kahramanmaraş, Kilis, Malatya, Mardin, Mersin, Muş, Osmaniye, Siirt, Şanlıurfa, Şırnak, Tunceli, Van
Turkey	Istanbul (CG)	Balıkesir, Bilecik, Bolu, Bursa, Çanakkale, Düzce, Edirne, Istanbul, Kırklareli, Kocaeli, Sakarya, Tekirdağ, Yalova
Ukraine	Kyiv (E)	Ukraine
United Kingdom	London (E)	England and Wales
United Kingdom	Belfast (CG)	Northern Ireland
United Kingdom	Edinburgh (CG)	Scotland

=== Bureau of Near Eastern Affairs (NEA) ===
Country	Post	Consular District
Algeria	Algiers (E)	All of Algeria
Bahrain	Manama (E)	All of Bahrain
Egypt	Cairo (E)	All of Egypt
Egypt	Alexandria (CG)	Limited consular services
Iraq	Baghdad (E)	All of Iraq
Israel	Tel Aviv (E)	All other territory in Israel
Jerusalem	Jerusalem (CG)	West Bank, Gaza, and the municipality of Jerusalem
Jordan	Amman (E)	All of Jordan
Kuwait	Kuwait (E)	All of Kuwait
Lebanon	Beirut (E)	All of Lebanon
Country	Post	Consular District
Libya	Tripoli (E)	All of Libya
Morocco	Casablanca (CG)	All of Morocco
Oman	Muscat (E)	All of Oman
Qatar	Doha (E)	All of Qatar
Saudi Arabia	Riyadh (E)	Central provinces: Al Jawf, Ha’il, Al Qasim, Ar Riyadh, and Ar Hudud aah Shaliyah.
Saudi Arabia	Dhahran (CG)	Eastern coast province of Ash Sharaqiyah.
Saudi Arabia	Jeddah (CG)	Western coast provinces: Tabuk, Madinah, Makkah, Baha, Asir, Jizan, and Najran.
Syria	Damascus (E)	All of Syria
Tunisia	Tunis (E)	All of Tunisia
United Arab Emirates	Abu Dhabi (E)	The Emirate of Abu Dhabi only. All IVs are processed in Abu Dhabi.
United Arab Emirates	Dubai (CG)	The Emirate of Dubai, the six Northern Emirates and NIV services for residents of Iran.
Yemen	Sanaa (E)	All of Yemen

=== Bureau of South and Central Asian Affairs (SCA) ===
Country	Post	Consular District
Afghanistan	Kabul (E)	All of Afghanistan
Bangladesh	Dhaka (E)	All of Bangladesh
India	New Delhi (E)	States of Bihar, Jammu and Kashmir, Punjab, Haryana, Rajasthan, Himachal Pradesh, Uttaranchal, Uttarakhand, Uttar Pradesh, and the Union Territories of Delhi and Chandigarh. All of Bhutan
India	Chennai (C)	States of Tamil Nadu, Kerala, Karnataka, the Union Territories of the Andaman and Nicobar Islands, and the Union Territories of Lakshadweep and Puducherry.
India	Hyderabad (C)	Andhra Pradesh, Telangana, and Odisha
India	Kolkata (CG)	States of West Bengal, Jharkhand, Nagaland, Mizoram, Manipur, Tripura, Meghalaya, Arunachal Pradesh, Sikkim, and Assam
India	Mumbai (CG)	States of Maharashtra, Gujarat, Goa, Madhya Pradesh, Chhattisgarh, and the Union Territories of Daman Diu, Dadra and Nagar Haveli
Kazakhstan	Nur-Sultan (E)	All of Kazakhstan
Kazakhstan	Almaty (CG)	Shares responsibility with Nur-Sultan for all of Kazakhstan
Kyrgyzstan	Bishkek (E)	All of Kyrgyzstan
Nepal	Kathmandu (E)	All of Nepal
Pakistan	Islamabad (E)	Districts of Abbottabad, Attock, Azad Jammu and Kashmir, Bhakkar, Chakwal, Gilgit, Gujranwala, Gujrat, Haripur, Islamabad, Jhelum, Khushab, Mandi Bahauddin, Mansehra, Mianwali, Narowal, Rawalpindi, Sargodha, and Sialkot
Pakistan	Karachi (CG)	Provinces of Sindh and Balochistan
Pakistan	Lahore (CG)	Districts of Bahawalnagar, Bahawalpur, Dera Ghazi Khan, Faisalabad, Multan, Leiah, Jhang, Muzaffargarh, Okara, Rahim Yar Khan, Rajanpur, Sahiwal, Sheikhupura, Toba Tek Singh, and Vihari
Pakistan	Peshawar (CG)	Districts of Bannu, Batagram, Charsadda, Chitral, Dera Ismail Khan, Dir, Federally Administered Tribal Areas, Hangu, Karak, Kohat, Kohistan, Kolachi, Lakki, Mardan, Nowshera, Swabi Malak, and Tank
Sri Lanka	Colombo (E)	All of Sri Lanka and the Maldives
Tajikistan	Dushanbe (E)	All of Tajikistan
Turkmenistan	Ashgabat (E)	All of Turkmenistan
Uzbekistan	Tashkent (E)	All of Uzbekistan

=== Bureau of Western Hemisphere Affairs (WHA) ===
Country	Post	Consular District
Argentina	Buenos Aires (E)	All of Argentina
Bahamas	Nassau (E)	All of Bahamas and Turks and Caicos Islands
Barbados	Bridgetown (E)	All of Barbados and Anguilla, Antigua and Barbuda, the British Virgin Islands, Dominica, Guadeloupe, Martinique, Montserrat, St. Barthélemy, St. Kitts and Nevis, St. Lucia, French St. Martin, and St. Vincent and the Grenadines
Bolivia	La Paz (E)	All of Bolivia
Belize	Belmopan (E)	All of Belize
Brazil	Brasília (E)	Federal District, Mato Grosso, Rondonia, Amazonas, Acre, Roraima, Amapa, Para, Goias, Tocantins, Minas Gerais
Brazil	Porto Alegre (C)	Rio Grande do Sul, Santa Catarina
Brazil	Recife (CG)	Pernambuco, Maranhao, Ceara, Piaui, Paraiba, Rio Grande do Norte, Alagoas, Sergipe
Brazil	Rio de Janeiro (CG)	Rio de Janeiro, Bahia, Espirito Santo
Brazil	São Paulo (CG)	São Paulo, Parana, Mato Grosso do Sul
Canada	Ottawa (E)	Eastern Ontario (Kingston, Lanark, Leeds, Prescott, Renfrew, Russell and Stormont); and those parts of the Québec regions of Outaouais and Abitibi-Témiscamingue near Ottawa
Canada	Calgary (CG)	Alberta, Saskatchewan, and Manitoba; and Northwest Territories
Canada	Halifax (CG)	Atlantic Canada: New Brunswick, Newfoundland, Nova Scotia and P.E.I. and the French islands of St. Pierre and Miquelon
Canada	Montreal (CG)	Greater Montréal and the regions of southern Québec province (Laurentides, Lanaudière, Laval, Montreal, Montregie, Estrie, and the southern parts of Centre-du-Québec), including Joliette, Drummondville, and Sherbrooke
Canada	Quebec (CG)	Those regions of Québec province to the north and east of the Montreal and Ottawa Districts (indicated above), plus the territory of Nunavut
Canada	Toronto (CG)	Ontario (except for areas East of Kingston, which are included in the Ottawa consular district)
Canada	Vancouver (CG)	British Columbia and Yukon Territory
Chile	Santiago (E)	All of Chile; emergency support for Falkland Islands in coordination with Embassy London
Colombia	Bogotá (E)	All of Colombia
Costa Rica	San José (E)	All of Costa Rica
Cuba	Havana	All of Cuba
Dominican Republic	Santo Domingo (E)	All of Dominican Republic
Dutch Caribbean	Curaçao (CG)	All Caribbean locations of the Kingdom of the Netherlands, which includes Aruba, Curaçao, and Sint Maarten (St. Martin). Also all Dutch public bodies, which includes Bonaire, Sint (St.) Eustatius (Statia), and Saba.
Ecuador	Quito (E)	All other areas in Ecuador not covered by Guayaquil
Ecuador	Guayaquil (CG)	Galapagos, Guayas, Manabi, Loja, Azuay, Zamora Chinchipe, Canar, El Oro, Santa Elena, and Los Rios
El Salvador	San Salvador (E)	All of El Salvador
Grenada	St. Georges (E)	All of Grenada
Guatemala	Guatemala City (E)	All of Guatemala
Guyana	Georgetown (E)	All of Guyana
Haiti	Port-au-Prince (E)	All of Haiti
Honduras	Tegucigalpa (E)	All of Honduras
Jamaica	Kingston (E)	Jamaica and the Cayman Islands
Mexico	Mexico City (E)	Chiapas, Guanajuato, Guerrero, Estado de Mexico, Hidalgo, Mexico City (DF), Michoacan, Morelos, Oaxaca, Puebla, Querétaro, Tabasco, Tlaxcala, Veracruz; Cities of Tampico, Ciudad Madero, and Altamira in Tamaulipas
Mexico	Ciudad Juárez (CG)	Chihuahua
Mexico	Guadalajara (CG)	Aguascalientes, Colima, Jalisco, Nayarit
Mexico	Hermosillo (CG)	Sonora (south, see description of Nogales), Sinaloa
Mexico	Matamoros (CG)	The division of Tamaulipas between the Matamoros and Nuevo Laredo consular district is defined by the Rio Salado, northwest of Ciudad Guerrero. Nuevo Laredo will cover all to the north and west of the river. Matamoros covers all of Tamaulipas to the east and south of the river except the cities of Tampico, Ciudad Madero, and Altamira, which are covered by Mexico City.
Mexico	Mérida (CG)	Campeche, Quintana Roo, Yucatán
Mexico	Monterrey (CG)	Nuevo León, Coahuila (south see Nuevo Laredo for complete demarcation), Durango, San Luis Potosí, Zacatecas
Mexico	Nogales (CG)	The state of Sonora is bisected into Northern Sonora (Nogales) and Southern Sonora (Hermosillo). The northern boundaries of the following municipalities run in a generally latitudinal manner, past the town of Benjamin Hill, and everything south of this line is the consular district of Hermosillo: Pitiquito, Trincheras, Benjamin Hill, Opodepe, Banamichi, Cumpas, Villa Hidalgo, Bacerac.
Mexico	Nuevo Laredo (CG)	Tamaulipas to the north and west of the Rio Salado, west of Ciudad Guerrero. In Northern Coahuila, Nuevo Laredo is divided from Monterrey's part (Southern Coahuila); starting from the border of Nuevo León, one can follow the Salado River generally by proceeding along Highway 95 from the Nuevo León border from the town of Rio Salado to Nueva Rosita. From there, Highway 93 runs through Palau and Muzquiz and off to the Northwest, until Los Alamos. From there, draw a line to the southern tip of Big Bend. Towns like La Union and El Olan will be in Nuevo Laredo's district; all towns touching Route 93 or Route 95 and points south will be in Monterrey's district.
Mexico	Tijuana (CG)	Baja California, Baja California Sur
Nicaragua	Managua (E)	All of Nicaragua
Panama	Panama City (E)	All of Panama
Paraguay	Asunción (E)	All of Paraguay
Peru	Lima (E)	All of Peru
Suriname	Paramaribo (E)	All of Suriname and French Guiana
Trinidad and Tobago	Port of Spain (E)	All of Trinidad and Tobago
Uruguay	Montevideo (E)	All of Uruguay
Venezuela	Caracas (E)	All of Venezuela

== See also ==
- Consular district
- List of diplomatic missions of the United States
