= Strait Talk =

Strait Talk is a non-profit organization founded in 2005 by Brown University graduate Johnny Lin that facilitates conflict resolution dialogue among young professionals on the Taiwan Strait issue. It is the only known program focused on promoting peaceful and innovative discussion between young people across the Taiwan Strait and aspires to create grassroots change that will someday lead to meaningful resolutions. The focal point of the organization is a week-long symposium held on university campuses, bringing together five delegates from each of the three communities: mainland China, Taiwan, and the United States (or Hong Kong in Strait Talk Hong Kong). Under the guidance of an experienced mediator, the fifteen delegates participate in intensive workshops modeled after the Interactive Conflict Resolution method. At the end of the symposium, the delegates draft a comprehensive consensus document that proposes creative and amenable solutions to cross-strait issues. Currently, there are four chapters of Strait Talk located on the following college campuses: Brown University, University of California, Berkeley, National Taiwan University, and the University of Hong Kong.

Over the course of the academic year, Strait Talk chapters host several events to educate the general public about the importance of cross-strait relations. Past speakers have included James Lilley, former US Ambassador to China, Richard C. Bush, former chairman of the American Institute in Taiwan, and Douglas H. Paal, former director of the American Institute in Taiwan.
