= Clark Ervin =

American politician (born 1959)

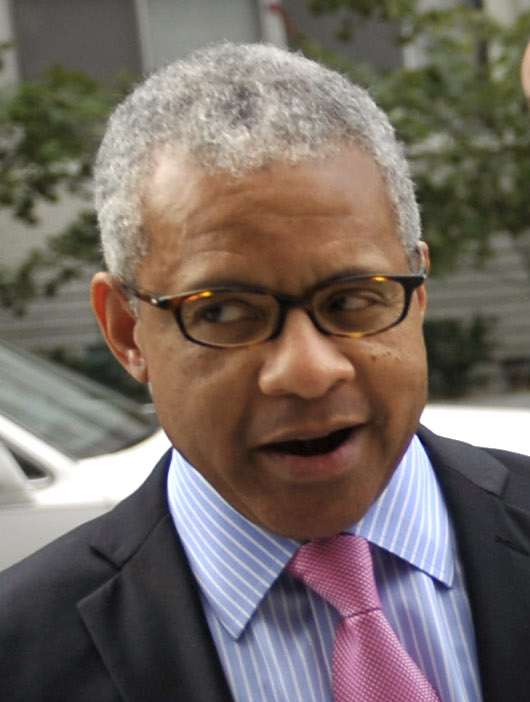

Inspector General of the Department of Homeland Security
- In office January 24, 2003 – December 8, 2004; Acting: January 24, 2003 – October 26, 2003
- President: George W. Bush
- Preceded by: Position established
- Succeeded by: Richard Skinner

Inspector General of the Department of State
- In office August 3, 2001 – January 23, 2003
- President: George W. Bush
- Preceded by: Anne Marie Sigmund (Acting)
- Succeeded by: Anne Marie Sigmund (Acting)

Personal details
- Born: Clark Kent Ervin; April 1, 1959 (age 67)
- Party: Republican
- Education: Harvard University (BA, JD); St Catherine's College, Oxford (MA)

Clark Kent Ervin (born April 1, 1959), currently the head of Homeland Security Program at the Aspen Institute, was the first Inspector General of the United States Department of Homeland Security (DHS).

== Political career ==
He was appointed on December 26, 2003, in a recess appointment by President George W. Bush. Prior to appointment, he had served as the acting inspector general since January 10, 2003. During his tenure, Ervin issued a number of reports critical of mismanagement and security flaws at the newly formed Department. In December 2004, his recess appointment expired, and the White House declined to nominate him for confirmation by the United States Senate.

The end of his term was controversial. Critics viewed the lack of White House support as retribution for Ervin's aggressive efforts to root out waste, fraud, and incompetence. For example, "I think this was a voice that was a little too critical and made the administration a little too uncomfortable," said the executive director of the Project on Government Oversight. The White House disagreed with that perspective, saying "His term expired and that's that." In May 2006, Ervin published a book -- Open Target: Where America is Vulnerable to Attack—that gives details of his tenure at the DHS as well as his views on the current lack of preparedness for new terrorist attacks.

Prior to his service at DHS, Ervin served as the Inspector General of the United States Department of State and the Broadcasting Board of Governors. Before his work for the Bush administration, Ervin served in Texas state government:

- From 1995 until 1999, he served as the Assistant Secretary of State of Texas;
- From 1999 until April 2001, he served as Deputy Attorney General, General Counsel, and Director of Administration in the office of then Texas Attorney General John Cornyn.

Ervin served in the first Bush White House from 1989 to 1991 as the Associate Director of Policy in the Office of National Service. He returned to his native Houston in 1991 to run for the 29th Congressional District. Ervin won the Republican nomination with 55% of the vote, but lost the general election by a 65% to 35% landslide in a Democratic leaning district.

He served as the co-chairman for Barack Obama's transition team for DHS in 2008. He also served as one of the eight members of the bi-partisan Commission on Wartime Contracting in Iraq and Afghanistan.

== Law career ==
Ervin has practiced law in the private sector in Houston twice, first with Vinson & Elkins from 1985 to 1989, and later with Locke, Liddell & Sapp from 1993-1995. Ervin is currently a partner in the Washington, DC law firm Squire Patton Boggs.

== Education ==
Ervin graduated from The Kinkaid School in 1977, Harvard College in 1980, and Harvard Law School in 1985, all with honors. Between college and law school, Ervin studied Philosophy, Politics and Economics at Oxford as a Rhodes Scholar, earning a master's degree in 1982.

== Personal life ==
Mr. Ervin is married to Carolyn A. Harris with whom he has a daughter, Callie. He is Episcopalian and a parishioner at St. John's Episcopal Church, Lafayette Square in Washington, D.C.

Ervin gets the name "Clark Kent Ervin" from his brother, Art, after the Superman alter-ego. The brother suggested the name on his day of birth after noting the fact that he was born a month premature and his desire to survive amidst all odds.

== Books ==
- Clark Kent Ervin (May 2006). Open Target: Where America is Vulnerable to Attack. Palgrave Macmillan. ISBN 1-4039-7288-5.
