= John Martin O'Keefe =

American diplomat and career foreign service officer

John Martin O'Keefe (born 1946) is a United States diplomat and a career foreign service officer. He served as the United States Ambassador to Kyrgyzstan 2000–2003. He graduated from Loyola University Maryland and Harvard University.

Diplomatic posts
Preceded by Anne Marie Sigmund	United States Ambassador to Kyrgyzstan; 2000–2003	Succeeded by Stephen M. Young
