= Anne Marie Sigmund =

American diplomat

Anne Sigmund

Inspector General of the Department of State (Acting)
- In office January 24, 2003 – September 28, 2003
- President: George W. Bush
- Preceded by: Clark Ervin
- Succeeded by: Anne W. Patterson (Acting)
- In office February 4, 2001 – August 3, 2001
- President: George W. Bush
- Preceded by: Jacquelyn Williams-Bridgers
- Succeeded by: Clark Ervin

United States Ambassador to Kyrgyzstan
- In office September 30, 1997 – August 10, 2000
- President: Bill Clinton
- Preceded by: Eileen Malloy
- Succeeded by: John Martin O'Keefe

Personal details
- Born: 1946 (age 78–79)
- Education: State University of New York, Plattsburgh (BS)

Anne Marie Sigmund (born 1946) served as the U.S. Ambassador to Kyrgyzstan from 1997 to 2000.

Diplomatic posts
Preceded by Eileen Malloy	United States Ambassador to Kyrgyzstan; 1997–2000	Succeeded by John O'Keefe
