= List of ambassadors of the United States to Kyrgyzstan =

Ambassador of the United States to Kyrgyzstan
- Seal of the United States Department of State

- Flag of a United States ambassador

- Incumbent; Steven Gillen since TBD
- Nominator: The president of the United States
- Appointer: The president; with Senate advice and consent
- Inaugural holder: Edward Hurwitz as Ambassador Extraordinary and Plenipotentiary
- Formation: August 11, 1992
- Website: U.S. Embassy - Bishkek

This is a list of ambassadors of the United States to Kyrgyzstan.

Until 1991 the Kirghiz Soviet Socialist Republic had been a constituent SSR of the Soviet Union. Upon the breakup of the USSR, the Supreme Soviet of Kyrgyzstan declared itself independent of the Soviet Union on August 31, 1991, and renamed itself the Republic of Kyrgyzstan. The United States recognized Kyrgyzstan on December 26, 1991. An embassy was established in the capital, Bishkek, on February 1, 1992, with Edmund McWilliams as Chargé d'Affaires ad interim. Relations between the United States and Kyrgyzstan have been continuous since that time.

The U.S. Embassy in Kyrgyzstan is located in Bishkek.

== Ambassadors ==
Name	Title	Appointed	Presented credentials	Terminated mission	Notes
Edward Hurwitz – Career FSO	Ambassador Extraordinary and Plenipotentiary	August 11, 1992	September 17, 1992	October 11, 1994	
Eileen A. Malloy – Career FSO	Ambassador Extraordinary and Plenipotentiary	August 26, 1994	October 25, 1994	July 7, 1997	
Anne M. Sigmund – Career FSO	Ambassador Extraordinary and Plenipotentiary	August 1, 1997	September 30, 1997	August 10, 2000	
John Martin O'Keefe – Career FSO	Ambassador Extraordinary and Plenipotentiary	June 14, 2000	September 23, 2000	July 6, 2003	
Stephen M. Young – Career FSO	Ambassador Extraordinary and Plenipotentiary	April 16, 2003	August 26, 2003	August 17, 2005	
Marie Yovanovitch – Career FSO	Ambassador Extraordinary and Plenipotentiary	November 20, 2004	February 4, 2005	February 4, 2008	
Tatiana C. Gfoeller – Career FSO	Ambassador Extraordinary and Plenipotentiary	October 22, 2008	October 14, 2008	March 8, 2011	
Pamela L. Spratlen – Career FSO	Ambassador Extraordinary and Plenipotentiary	April 15, 2011	May 24, 2011	December 12, 2014	
Richard Miles – Career FSO	Chargé d'Affaires, ad interim	February 13, 2015	N/A	October 14, 2015	
Sheila Gwaltney – Career FSO	Ambassador Extraordinary and Plenipotentiary	August 6, 2015	October 14, 2015	August 2, 2017	
John Bernlohr	Chargé d'Affaires, ad interim	August 2, 2017	N/A	September 18, 2018	
Donald Lu – Career FSO	Ambassador Extraordinary and Plenipotentiary	September 18, 2018	October 12, 2018	September 14, 2021	
Sonata Coulter – Career FSO	Chargé d'Affaires, ad interim	September 14, 2021	N/A	November 21, 2022	
Lesslie Viguerie – Career FSO	Ambassador Extraordinary and Plenipotentiary	September 29, 2022	December 29, 2022	September 25, 2026	
Matthew Habinowski – Career FSO	Chargé d'Affaires, ad interim	September 25, 2026	N/A	November 14, 2026	
Steven Gillen – Career FSO	Ambassador Extraordinary and Plenipotentiary	September 30, 2026	TBD		

== See also ==
- Kyrgyzstan – United States relations
- Foreign relations of Kyrgyzstan
- Ambassadors of the United States
