= Donald Lu =

American diplomat (born 1966)

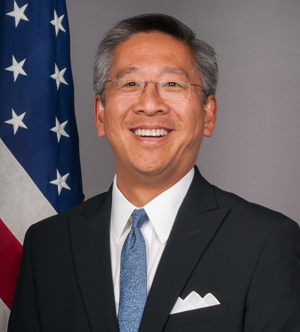
- Official portrait, 2013

7th Assistant Secretary of State for South and Central Asian Affairs
- In office September 15, 2021 – January 20, 2025
- President: Joe Biden
- Preceded by: Nisha Desai Biswal (2017)
- Succeeded by: S. Paul Kapur

United States Ambassador to Kyrgyzstan
- In office October 12, 2018 – September 14, 2021
- President: Donald Trump; Joe Biden
- Preceded by: Sheila Gwaltney
- Succeeded by: Lesslie Viguerie

14th United States Ambassador to Albania
- In office January 13, 2015 – September 19, 2018
- President: Barack Obama; Donald Trump
- Preceded by: Alexander Arvizu
- Succeeded by: Yuri Kim

Personal details
- Born: 1966 (age 59–60) Huntington Beach, California, U.S.
- Spouse: Ariel Ahart
- Education: Princeton University (BA, MPA)

Donald Lu (born 1966) is a United States diplomat who had served as Assistant Secretary of State for South and Central Asian Affairs from 2021 to 2025. He previously served as both the United States Ambassador to Kyrgyzstan from 2018 to 2021 and the United States Ambassador to Albania from 2015 to 2018.

== Early life and education ==
Lu was born in Huntington Beach, California and is of Chinese heritage. He graduated with an A.B. from the Princeton School of Public and International Affairs at Princeton University in 1988 after completing a 158-page long senior thesis titled "The Involvement of International Peacekeeping in Providing Humanitarian Assistance." He later received an M.P.A. from the Woodrow Wilson School in 1991. Lu was a Peace Corps volunteer in Sierra Leone, West Africa in 1988-1990 helping restore hand-dug water wells, and teaching health education and latrine construction.

== Diplomatic career ==
Lu joined the United States Foreign Service in 1990. He served as a political officer in Peshawar, Pakistan from 1992 to 1994; as a consular officer in Tbilisi, Georgia from 1994 to 1996; and as a special assistant to Ambassador Frank Wisner from 1996 to 1997 and then political officer at the embassy in New Delhi, India from 1997 to 2000, covering Kashmir and India-Pakistan relations. He served as special assistant to the ambassador for the Newly Independent States from 2000 to 2001, and then as deputy director in the Office of Central Asian and South Caucasus Affairs from 2001 to 2003.

Lu served as Deputy Chief of Mission in Kyrgyzstan from 2003 to 2006, and in Azerbaijan from 2007 to 2009. He served as the Chargé d'affaires at the U.S. Embassy to Azerbaijan from July 4, 2009, to July 2010, when the office of the United States Ambassador to Azerbaijan was vacant. He was a proponent of the immediate appointment an ambassador. In May 2010, Ambassador Matthew Bryza was nominated to take the post.

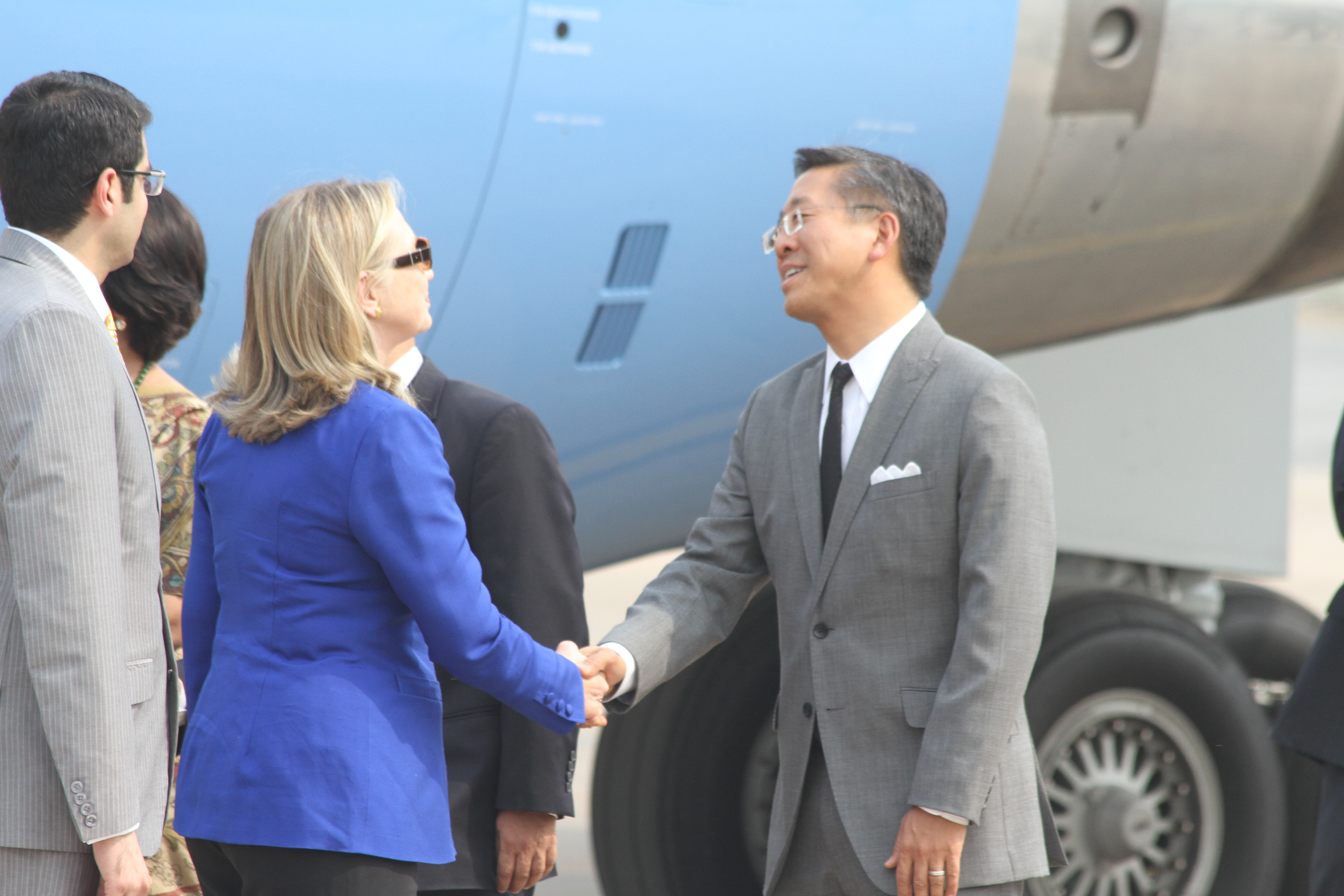
Secretary Clinton Is Greeted By Deputy Chief of Mission Lu

In July 2010, Lu was appointed Deputy Chief of Mission at the United States Embassy in New Delhi, India. He served in this post during President Obama's visit to New Delhi. This post was his second assignment to India.

=== Ambassador to Albania ===
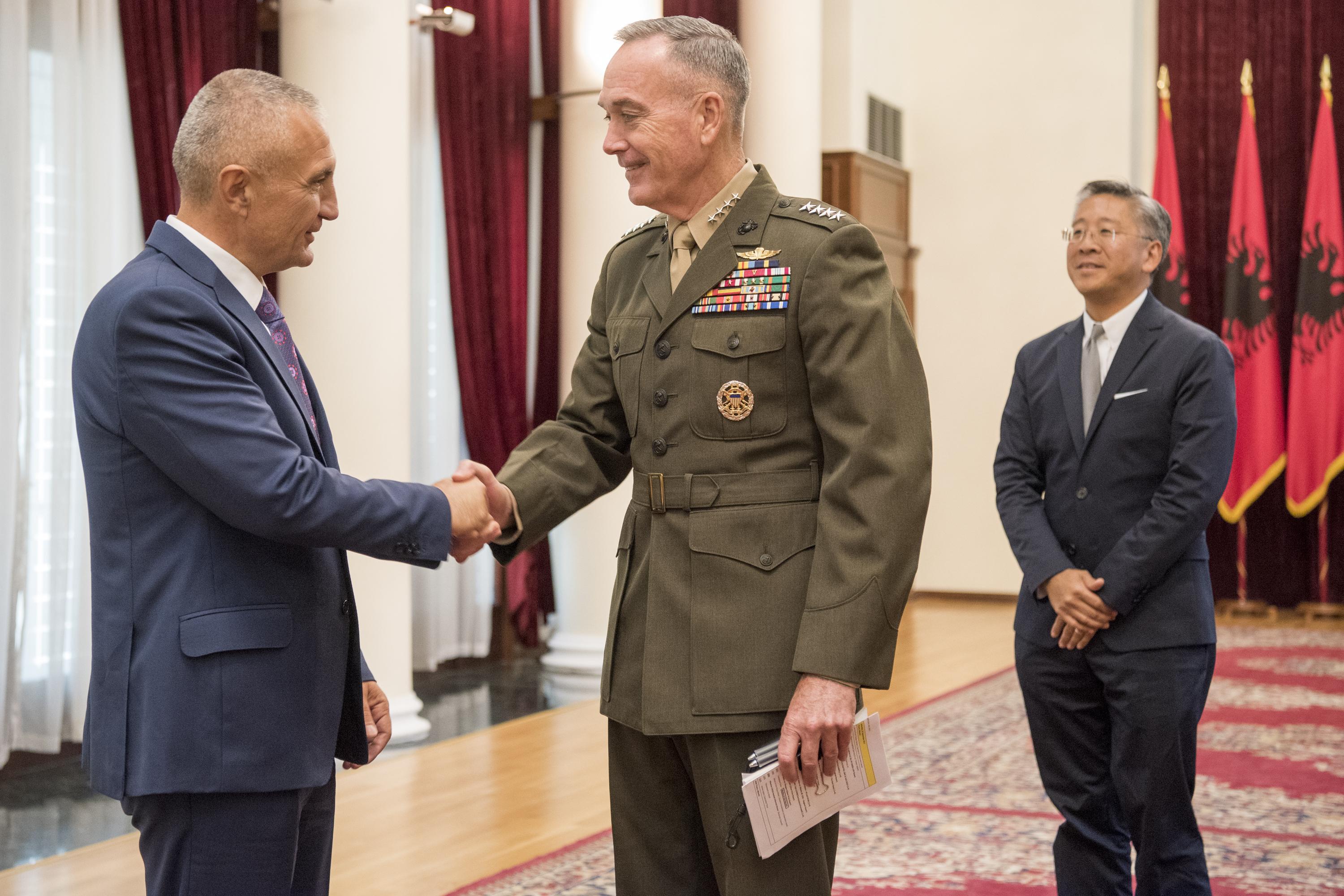
Lu with Albanian President Ilir Meta and General Joseph Dunford in 2017

On July 25, 2013, Lu was nominated to be the United States Ambassador to Albania by President Obama. Hearings were held before the Senate Foreign Relations Committee on Lu's nomination on September 26, 2013. The committee favorably reported his nomination to the Senate floor on October 31, 2013. His initial nomination expired at the end of the year and was returned to President Obama on January 3, 2014.

President Obama resent his nomination the next day. His nomination was again favorably reported on January 15, 2014. He was confirmed by the Senate on November 20, 2014. He was sworn in on December 17, 2014, and presented his credentials on January 13, 2015. This was his first official post as an Ambassador and not the Deputy Chief of Mission. He departed the post on September 19, 2018.

Before moving to Albania's capital, Tirana, he worked on the Ebola crisis in West Africa as Deputy Coordinator of Ebola response.

=== Ambassador to Kyrgyzstan ===
On May 24, 2018, Lu was nominated by President Donald Trump to be the next United States Ambassador to the Kyrgyz Republic. The Senate Foreign Relations Committee held hearings on Lu's nomination on June 28, 2018. The committee favorably reported the nomination to the Senate floor on July 10, 2018. Lu was confirmed by the entire Senate on September 6, 2018. He was sworn in on September 18, 2018, and presented his credentials to Kyrgyz President Sooronbai Jeenbekov on October 12, 2018.

=== State Department ===
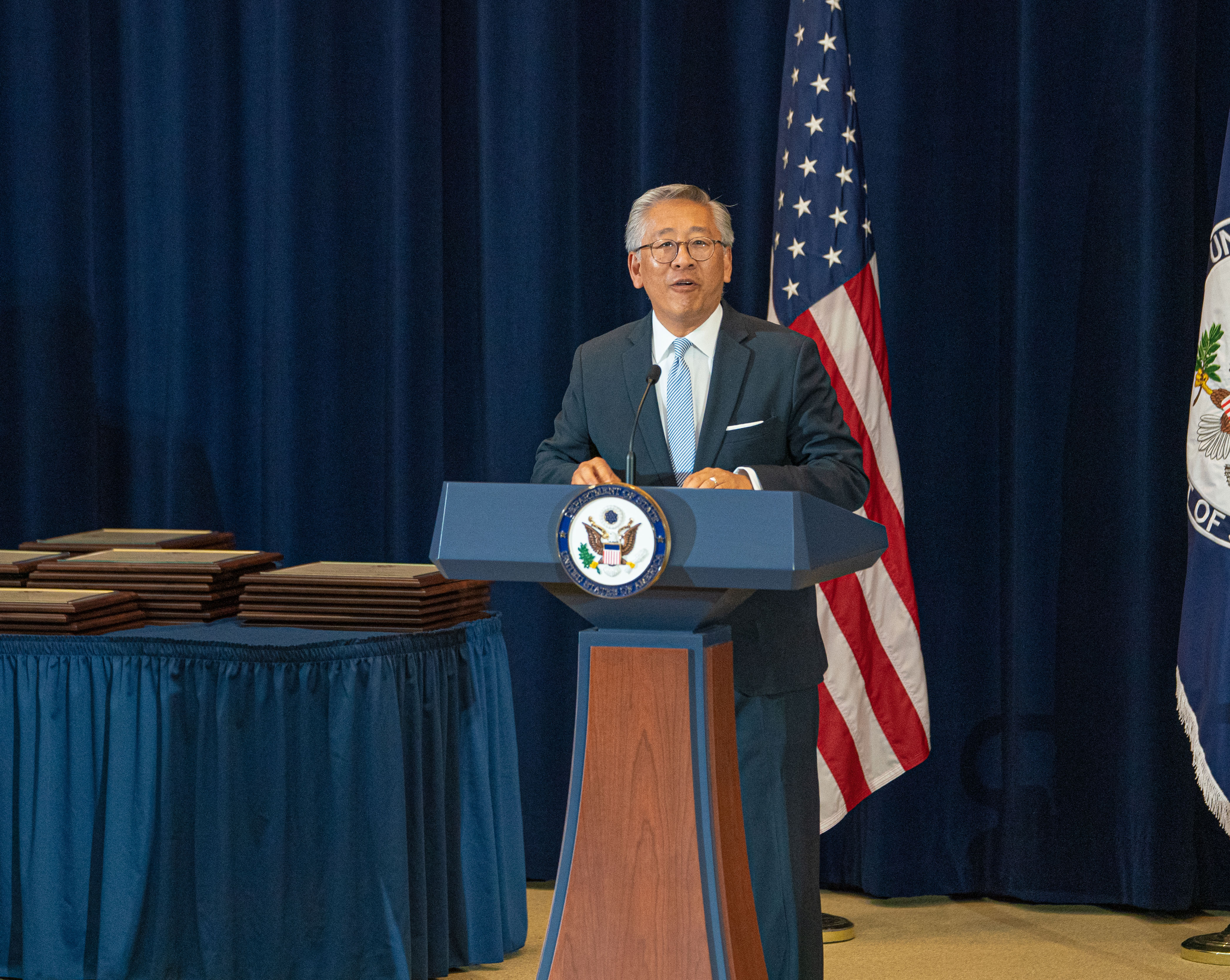
Lu speaks to State Department employees in 2022

On April 23, 2021, President Joe Biden nominated Lu to be the Assistant Secretary of State for South and Central Asian Affairs. Lu's nomination was examined by the Senate Foreign Relations Committee on July 28, 2021. The committee favorably reported it to the Senate floor on August 4, 2021. He was confirmed via voice vote by the entire Senate on September 13, 2021, and sworn in on September 15, 2021.

== Controversies ==
In April 2022, Pakistan's then prime minister Imran Khan claimed that prior to a no-confidence motion filed against him by opposition parties, Pakistan's ambassador to the US, Asad Majeed Khan, was warned by Assistant Secretary of State Donald Lu that Khan's continuation in office would have repercussions for bilateral ties between the two nations. Although the State Department denied it, Khan reiterated the allegations against Lu during a televised news conference. During the Department Press Briefing on April 8, 2022, Deputy State Department Spokesperson Jalina Porter was also asked about the allegation by Khan that the US encouraged the no-confidence vote, with Khan stating that he had a cable ("letter") to prove it. Foreign Policy highlighted the heightened tensions between Pakistan and the US in their South Asia Brief on April 7, 2022. Pakistan's National Security Council (NSC) announced it was issuing a "strong demarche" to an undisclosed country, presumably the US, over a 'threat letter'—purportedly showing evidence of a foreign conspiracy to oust Khan's PTI-led government—terming it as "blatant interference in the internal affairs of Pakistan". Furthermore, Pakistan's Inter-Services Public Relations (ISPR) director general (DG) major-general Babar Iftikhar commented on the issuance of the demarche during a press conference on April 14, stating that "In this case, it was given for undiplomatic language and is equal to interference." Shireen Mazari, a Pakistani politician who served as the federal minister for human rights under the PTI government, quoted Donald Lu as saying: "If Prime Minister Imran Khan remains in office, then PM Imran Khan will be isolated from the United States and we will take the issue head on; but if the vote of no-confidence succeeds, all will be forgiven".

On 23 May 2022, Imran Khan suggested in an interview with CNN that Lu be fired "for bad manners and sheer arrogance."

On 9 August 2023, The Intercept, an online American nonprofit news organization, published what they claimed was a copy of the previously undisclosed cypher—a secret Pakistani cable document—dated March 7, 2022, attempting to demonstrate the alleged pressure from the U.S. State Department to remove then Prime Minister Imran Khan. The alleged cypher published by The Intercept showed that the United States Department of State deployed in what PTI supporters claim was its push against Khan: promising warmer relations if Khan was removed, and isolation if he was not.

== Awards and honors ==
Lu was awarded two Meritorious Honor Awards and five Superior Honor Awards.

== Personal life ==
Lu is married to Ariel Ahart, a public health specialist. They have two children. In addition to English, Lu speaks Chinese, West African Krio, Urdu, Hindi, Russian, Georgian, Azerbaijani and Albanian.

== See also ==
- Ambassadors of the United States

Diplomatic posts
Preceded by Alexander Arvizu	United States Ambassador to Albania; 2015–2018	Succeeded by Yuri Kim
Preceded by Sheila Gwaltney	United States Ambassador to Kyrgyzstan; 2018–2021	Succeeded by Sonata Coulter; Charge d’Affaires
