= Eileen A. Malloy =

American diplomat (born 1954)

Eileen Malloy
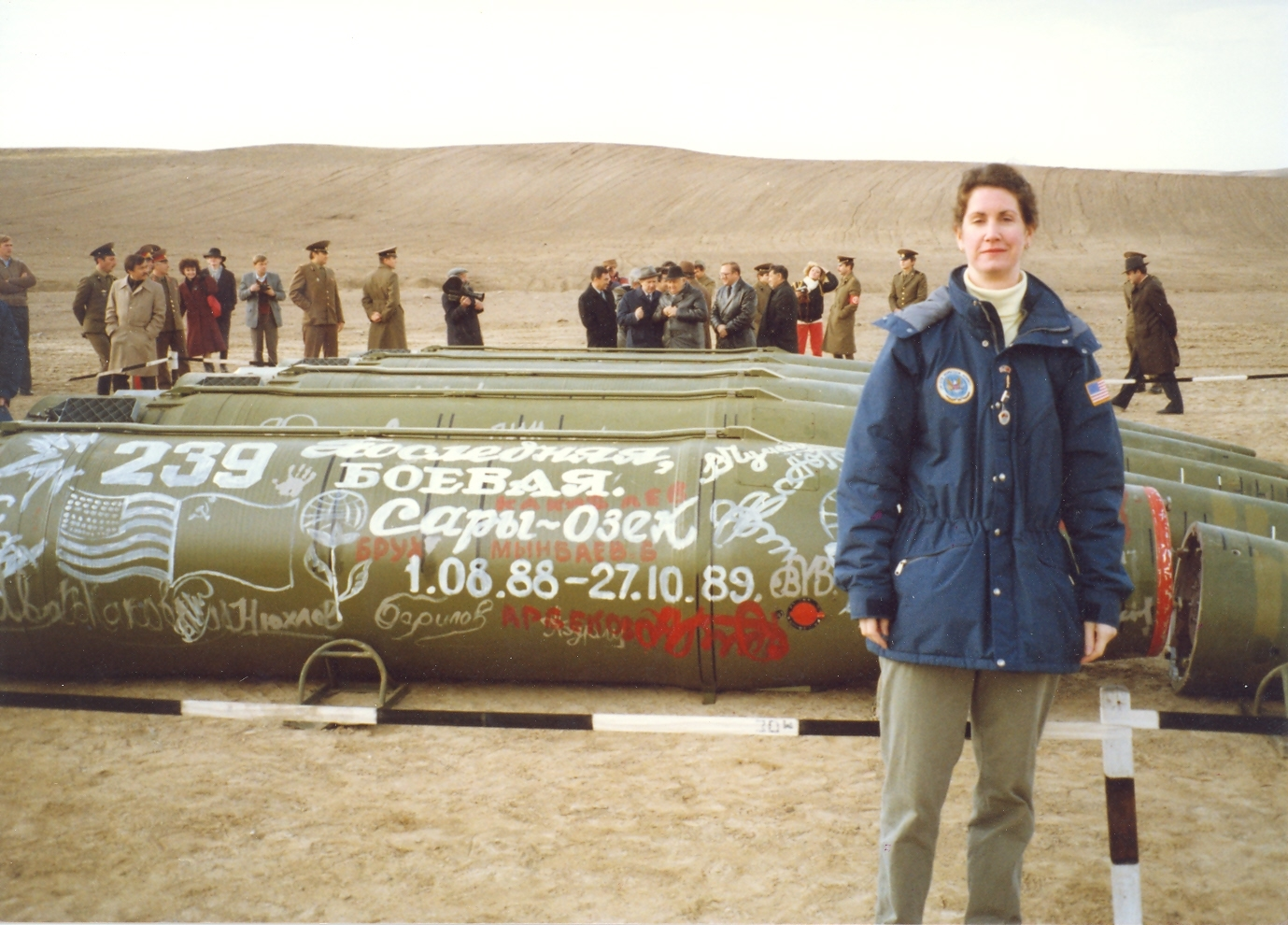
- Malloy at a Soviet missile destruction site in Saryozek, in May 1990

2nd United States Ambassador to Kyrgyzstan
- In office October 25, 1994 – July 7, 1997
- President: Bill Clinton
- Preceded by: Edward Hurwitz
- Succeeded by: Anne Marie Sigmund

Personal details
- Born: Eileen A. Malloy; July 9, 1954 (age 71) Teaneck, New Jersey, U.S.

Eileen A. Malloy (born July 9, 1954) served as the Deputy Assistant Secretary of State for European and Canadian affairs in the United States Department of State. She served as the United States Ambassador to Kyrgyzstan from 1994 to 1997.

== Career ==
In 1975, Malloy graduated from Georgetown University's Edmund A. Walsh School of Foreign Service with a BSFS. She is fluent in Russian. Malloy joined the United States Foreign Service in 1978. She served in the U.S. embassies in Ireland, the United Kingdom, Kyrgyzstan, twice in the U.S. embassy in Russia, the second time as Chief of the Arms Control Implementation Unit, in U.S. Consulate General Calgary in Canada, and as the U.S. Consul General in Sydney, NSW, Australia. United States President Bill Clinton announced his intention to nominate her as the U.S. Ambassador to Kyrgyzstan on 12 July 1994.

== Family ==
Malloy is married to James G. McLachlan. She has two daughters, Mary Kathryn Paegle and Christina Alana McLachlan.

Diplomatic posts
Preceded by Edward Hurwitz	U.S. Ambassador to Kyrgyzstan; 1994 – 1997	Succeeded by Anne Marie Sigmund
