= Stephen M. Young (diplomat) =

American diplomat

Stephen Young
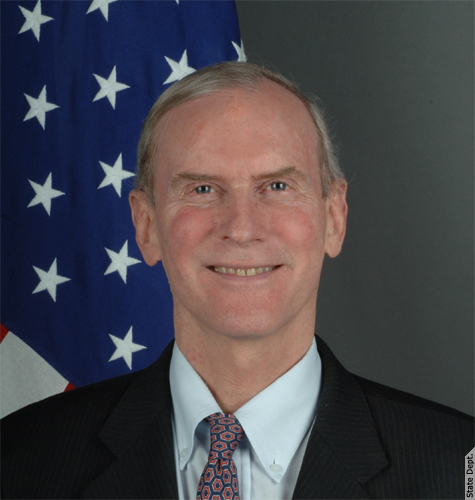

Director of the American Institute in Taiwan
- In office 2006–2009
- President: George W. Bush
- Preceded by: Douglas H. Paal
- Succeeded by: William A. Stanton

United States Ambassador to Kyrgyzstan
- In office 2003–2005
- President: George W. Bush
- Preceded by: John Martin O'Keefe
- Succeeded by: Marie L. Yovanovitch

Personal details
- Born: Stephen Markley Young; 1951 (age 74–75) Washington, D.C.
- Education: Wesleyan University (BA); University of Chicago (MA, PhD)

Stephen Markley Young (born 1951) is an American diplomat who was the consul general of the Consulate General of the United States in Hong Kong under the State department in the Obama administration.

He took office in March 2010. As consul general, Young was responsible for the Hong Kong and Macao special administrative regions. He was the director of the American Institute in Taiwan, the de facto United States embassy of Taiwan in Taipei, from March 18, 2006 to July 3, 2009. He was a member of the faculty at the National Defense University's Dwight D. Eisenhower School for National Security and Resource Strategy, located at Fort Lesley J. McNair. Young served as the U.S. ambassador to the Kyrgyz Republic from 2003 to 2005.

== Biography ==
Young was born in Washington, D.C. and moved to Taiwan at age 12, where his father served as a military adviser to the Republic of China Army in Kaohsiung from 1963 to 1965. Young earned a B.A. from Wesleyan University and an M.A. and Ph.D from the University of Chicago, both in history.

Within the United States Department of State, he has served in the Bureau of East Asian and Pacific Affairs and the Office of Soviet Affairs. He has been the Director of the Office of Caucasus and Security Affairs, the Director of the Office of Caucasus and Central Asian Affairs, the Director of the Office of Pakistan, Afghanistan and Bangladesh Affairs, and the Director of the Office of Chinese and Mongolian Affairs.

Young served two tours in Moscow, a tour in Beijing. He was the Ambassador to the Kyrgyz Republic (now Kyrgyzstan), and Director of the American Institute in Taiwan in Taipei. He speaks fluent Mandarin Chinese and Russian.

While serving at the Consulate General of the United States, Hong Kong and Macau, he also oversaw Macau–United States relations.

== Personal ==
Young married Barbara A. Finamore, an attorney who manages the China Program at the Natural Resources Defense Council, in 1983. They have three children.

== Reception ==
Young's reputation in Taiwan became controversial after many of his diplomatic cables were leaked. He was described as an 'ugly American' and an 'ugly diplomat' by James Soong, the chairman of the People First Party (PFP) in Taiwan, after Soong learned that he had been described as a 'wily' person in Young's reports.

In comments published in the pro-Beijing and Communist Party paper Wen Wei Po, Lew Mon-hung, a Hong Kong member of the Chinese People's Political Consultative Conference, has criticized Young, stating that he had covertly instigated and planned the Hong Kong Autonomy Movement, which Lew compared to the Taiwan independence movement, as Young was the then Consul General of the United States in Hong Kong, in an attempt to split Hong Kong away from China.

Diplomatic posts
Preceded by John Martin O'Keefe	United States Ambassador to Kyrgyzstan; 2003–2005	Succeeded by Marie L. Yovanovitch
Preceded by Douglas H. Paal	Director of the American Institute in Taiwan; 2006–2009	Succeeded by William A. Stanton
Preceded by Christopher J. Marut (interim)	United States Consul General to Hong Kong and Macau; 2010–2013	Succeeded by Clifford Hart
