= Nisha Desai Biswal =

Indian-American humanitarian political administrator (born 1968)

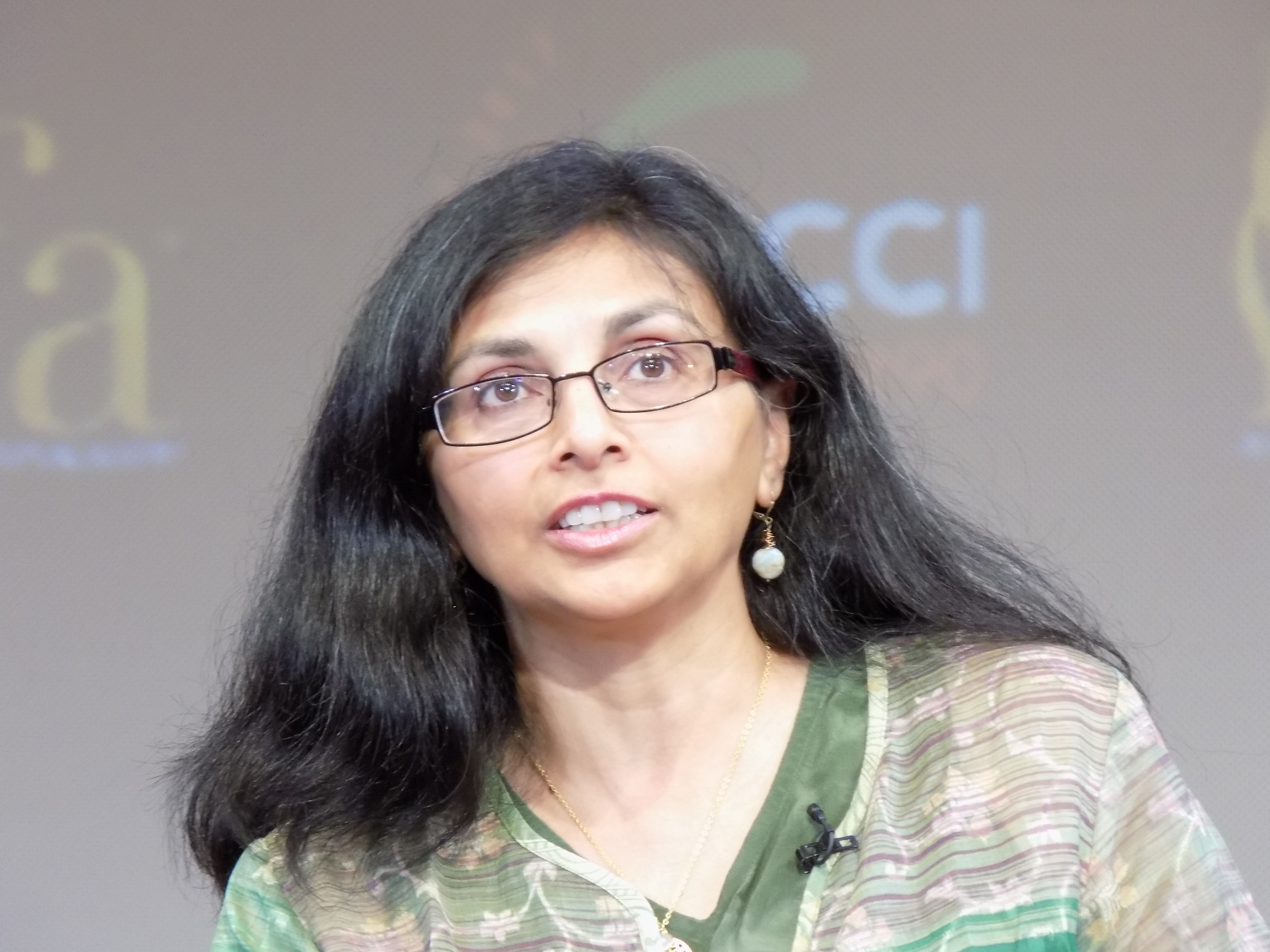
- Biswal at the 2017 FICCI - IIFA Global Business Forum

Deputy CEO of the U.S. International Development Finance Corporation
- Incumbent
- Assumed office August 14, 2023
- President: Joe Biden
- Preceded by: new position

6th Assistant Secretary of State for South and Central Asian Affairs
- In office January 24, 2014 – January 20, 2017
- President: Barack Obama
- Deputy: William E. Todd
- Preceded by: Robert Blake
- Succeeded by: Donald Lu (2021)

Personal details
- Born: Nisha Desai; 1968 (age 57–58) Gujarat, India
- Party: Democratic
- Spouse: Subrat Biswal
- Education: University of Virginia (BA)

Nisha Biswal (née Desai), (born 1968) is an American businesswoman and public official in the United States. Biswal is the deputy CEO of the U.S. International Development Finance Corporation. She previously served as senior vice president for international strategy and global initiatives and oversees South Asia programs at the United States Chamber of Commerce.

Prior to this, she served as the president of the US-India Business Council at the US Chamber of Commerce. Previously, she has also served as assistant secretary of State for South and Central Asian Affairs in the United States Department of State under President Barack Obama from 2013 to 2017. Biswal was the first Indian-American to hold this position.

Biswal oversaw the U.S.–India strategic partnership during a period of increased cooperation, including the initiation of the annual U.S.–India Strategic and Commercial Dialogue. In January 2017, she received the Samman Award from the President of India. She also played a key role in establishing the U.S.–Bangladesh Partnership Dialogue and the C5+1 Dialogue between the United States and the Central Asian countries of Kazakhstan, Kyrgyzstan, Tajikistan, Turkmenistan, and Uzbekistan.

Biswal also serves on the United States Institute of Peace International Advisory Council, on the Afghanistan Study Group and is on the board of directors for the Institute for Sustainable Communities, the Leadership Council for Women in National Security and is active in Democratic politics.

== Early life and education ==
Biswal immigrated to the United States from India with her parents. She earned a Bachelor of Arts degree in international relations from the University of Virginia.

== Career ==
After briefly working in public relations, Biswal became an overseas delegate for the American Red Cross, serving in Armenia, Azerbaijan and Georgia. Biswal served as Assistant Administrator for Asia at the U.S. Agency for International Development (USAID), overseeing US development assistance programs and policies for the Asia-Pacific region. She also spent over a decade on Capitol Hill, working as staff director for State and Foreign Operations Subcommittee in House Appropriations Committee and as professional staff for the Foreign Affairs Committee in the House of Representatives.

She was nominated for the post of Assistant Secretary of State for South and Central Asia by President Barack Obama on July 19, 2013. Most recently, Biswal was senior advisor for Albright Stonebridge Group, a global business strategy firm. At ASG, she worked with the India & South Asia practice. Since 2011, Biswal has served as a member of the Congressional-Executive Commission on China.

On March 30, 2023, Biswal was nominated by President Joe Biden to be the first Deputy CEO of the U.S. International Development Finance Corporation. Her nomination was confirmed by the senate on July 27, 2023 and she was sworn in on August 14, 2023.

== Personal life ==
Nisha Desai Biswal is an Indian American of Gujarati descent. Biswal lives in Washington, D.C., with her husband and two daughters.

== Awards ==
Year	Country	Award name	Given by	Field of Merit
2017	United States	Pravasi Bharatiya Samman	President of India	Public Service

Political offices
Preceded by Robert Blake	Assistant Secretary of State for South and Central Asian Affairs; 2014–2017	Succeeded by William E. Todd; Acting
