= Lesslie Viguerie =

American diplomat and attorney

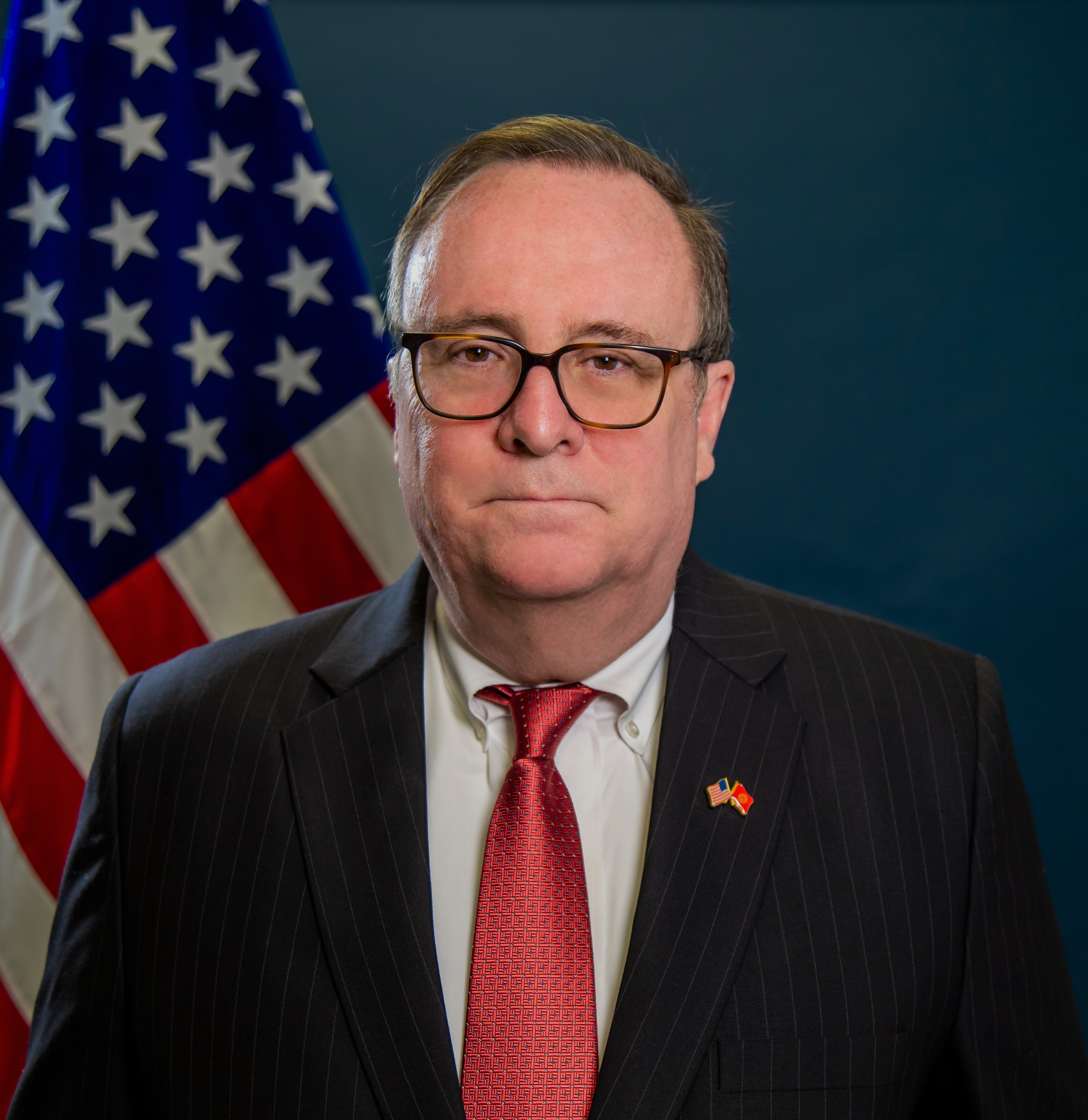

United States Ambassador to Kyrgyzstan
- In office December 29, 2022 – September 25, 2026
- President: Joe Biden; Donald Trump
- Preceded by: Donald Lu
- Succeeded by: Steven Gillen

Personal details
- Education: George Washington University (BA); Catholic University (JD)

Lesslie Clay Viguerie is an American attorney and career diplomat who had served as the United States ambassador to Kyrgyzstan.

== Education ==
Viguerie earned a Bachelor of Arts in international relations and affairs from George Washington University in 1982 and a Juris Doctor from the Columbus School of Law at the Catholic University of America.

== Career ==
Viguerie is a career member of the Senior Foreign Service, with the rank of minister-counselor. He serves as the Deputy Assistant Secretary for Central Asian and Pakistan affairs in the Bureau of South and Central Asian Affairs. Previously, he was Deputy Chief of Mission at the U.S. Embassy in Tashkent, Uzbekistan, and served as minister-counselor for political affairs at the U.S. Embassy in New Delhi, India. Viguerie was also director for Europe and Asia in the Bureau of International Narcotics and Law Enforcement Affairs and Director for Central Asia in the Bureau of South and Central Asia Affairs. Previous overseas assignments include Deputy Political Counselor for the U.S. Embassy in New Delhi, Senior Director of the Interagency Rule of Law Section for the U.S. Embassy in Kabul, and external political relations chief for the U.S. Embassy in Moscow. Viguerie has also served in the United Nations Department of Political and Peacebuilding Affairs.

Viguerie is an expert on Central Asia and an advocate for effective policy. He is a member of the District of Columbia Bar.

=== United States ambassador to Kyrgyzstan ===
On February 25, 2022, President Joe Biden nominated Viguerie to serve as the United States ambassador to Kyrgyzstan. Hearings on his nomination were held before the Senate Foreign Relations Committee on July 27, 2022. The committee favorably reported his nomination on August 3, 2022. He was confirmed by the whole United States Senate on September 29, 2022 via voice vote. He presented his credentials to President Sadyr Japarov on December 29, 2022.

== Awards and recognitions ==
Viguerie has received numerous State Department performance awards, including a Senior Foreign Service Performance award.

== Personal life ==
Viguerie is a native of Virginia and has three children, one adopted from Kazakhstan. He speaks Russian, Hindi, and Portuguese.

Diplomatic posts
Preceded by Donald Lu	United States Ambassador to Kyrgyzstan; 2022–present	Incumbent
