= S. Paul Kapur =

American scholar and professor

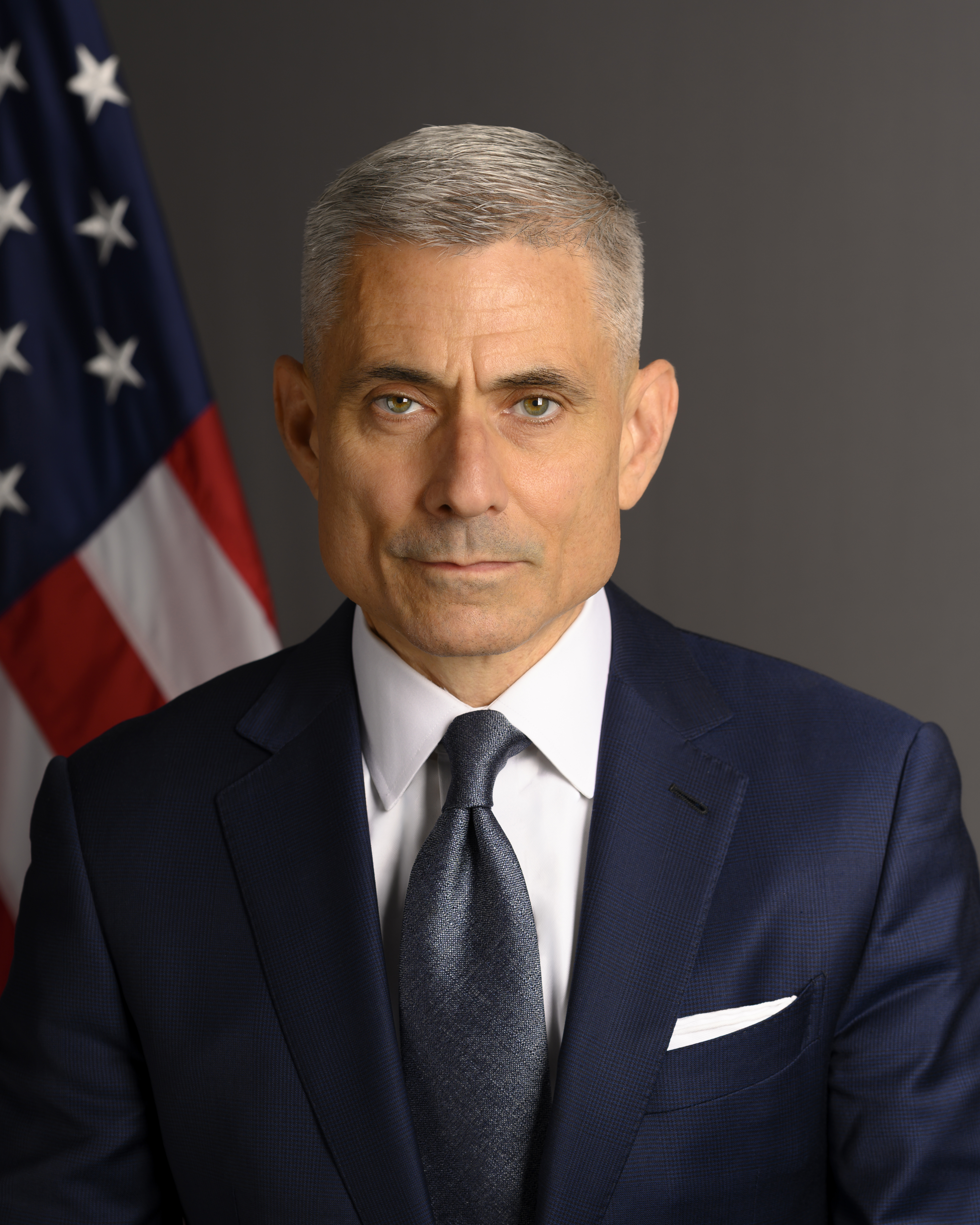

Assistant Secretary of State for South and Central Asian Affairs
- Incumbent
- Assumed office October 22, 2025
- President: Donald Trump
- Preceded by: Donald Lu

Personal details
- Born: Delhi, India
- Party: Republican
- Education: Amherst College (BA); University of Chicago (PhD)

Samir Paul Kapur is an American scholar and professor. He is currently serving as the Assistant Secretary of State for South and Central Asian Affairs in the Second Trump administration.

== Early life and education ==
Kapur was born in Delhi, India, to an Indian father and an American mother. Before the Senate Committee on Foreign Relations on 10 June 2025, he said he traveled to India frequently and developed an interest in researching it academically. Kapur completed his Bachelor's degree at Amherst College, and did his PhD at the University of Chicago.

== Career ==
Kapur is, as of 2025, a professor at the US Naval Postgraduate School (NPS). He is a visiting faculty member at the Hoover Institution. He has taught at Claremont McKenna College, the Naval War College and was also a visiting professor at Stanford University. At the NPS, he was the doctoral advisor for Quinn J. Rhodes, and Charles C. Readinger.

In 2025, he was nominated as the Assistant Secretary of State for South and Central Asian Affairs by the Second Trump administration, succeeding Donald Lu. He took up the position on 22 October of the same year.

== Views ==
Kapur, in his book Jihad as Grand Strategy, argued jihad was a major part of Pakistan's grand strategy, and not just one of the political instruments it used. He claimed the utilization of jihad by Pakistan was not a result of the country's instability, and instead said it was an intentional government strategy.

Kapur said he would work on improving and strengthening US–India relations according to US interests. He said India and the US shared many common objectives like an unrestricted Indo-Pacific not bound by Chinese hegemony, and also interests in trade, technology and energy.

== Works ==
- Dangerous Deterrent: Nuclear Weapons Proliferation and Conflict in South Asia. Stanford University Press. 2007. ISBN 9780804755504.
- With Sumit Ganguly: Ganguly, Sumit; Kapur, S. Paul (2010). India, Pakistan, and the Bomb: Debating Nuclear Stability in South Asia. Columbia University Press. ISBN 9780231512824. JSTOR 10.7312/gang14374.
- Jihad as Grand Strategy: Islamist Militancy, National Security, and the Pakistani State. Oxford University Press. 2016. ISBN 9780190611835.
- Co-edited with Diana Wueger and Rajeswari Pillai Rajagopalan: The Challenges of Nuclear Security: U. S. and Indian Perspectives. Initiatives in Strategic Studies: Issues and Policies. Palgrave Macmillan. 2024. doi:10.1007/978-3-031-56814-5. ISBN 978-3-031-56814-5.

== Sources ==
- Shrivastava, Anuj (11 June 2025). "Who is Paul Kapur? Indian-origin diplomat picked by Trump to handle South Asia affairs". WION.
