= Official Secrets Act, 1923 (Pakistan) =

Law in Pakistan

Imperial Legislative Council
- Territorial extent: British India (formerly); Pakistan
- Assented to by: Viceroy Rufus Isaacs, 1st Marquess of Reading
- Status: In force

The Official Secrets Act, 1923 (No. 19) is a law in Pakistan that traces its origins back to the British colonial era in India. Enacted during that time to protect state secrets and maintain the security of the British Empire, the act continues to be in force in present-day Pakistan.

== Background and purpose ==
The Official Secrets Act, 1923 was initially introduced by the British Indian Government as a means to safeguard classified information and maintain the integrity of official matters. Its primary objective was to prevent unauthorized disclosure of sensitive information that could potentially harm national security.

The 1923 law remained on the statute books after Pakistan attained independence in 1947, as the Government of India Act 1935 continued to be used as Pakistan's interim constitution until a new constitution would be voted on by the Constituent Assembly of Pakistan and promulgated into law, thereby repealing the 1935 act of the British parliament.

The Official Secrets Act, 1923 continued to be enforced in Pakistan after independence, as it was renewed by the Federal Laws (Revision and Declaration) Act of 1951, and by the Central Laws (Statute Reform) Ordinance of 1960, both of which referred to the 1923 law in its original form and contained provisions for its continued operation and enforcement throughout Pakistan.

== Provisions ==
The original Act consisted of seven sections that outline the provisions related to the protection of official secrets. It establishes the definition of an official secret and specifies the penalties for unauthorized possession, communication, or disclosure of such information. The Act also addresses acts of espionage or any activities that may jeopardize the security of the nation.

According to the Act, individuals who hold positions or occupations that provide them access to official secrets are bound by a duty of confidentiality. They are prohibited from sharing or communicating such information with unauthorized persons, including foreign governments or organizations. Violation of this duty is considered a criminal offense.

The Act empowers the government to conduct investigations, search premises, and seize materials in cases related to suspected offenses under the Official Secrets Act. It also provides the legal framework for the prosecution and punishment of individuals found guilty of violating the Act's provisions. Penalties may include imprisonment and fines.

After the amendment in 2023, the Official Secrets Act now contains sixteen sections.

== Significance and application ==
The Official Secrets Act, 1923 plays a crucial role in protecting classified information and upholding national security in Pakistan. It ensures that individuals entrusted with access to official secrets maintain strict confidentiality and refrain from unauthorized disclosure. By establishing legal consequences for violations, the Act acts as a deterrent against espionage and other activities that may pose a threat to the nation's interests.

== See also ==
- Official Secrets Act (India)
- Official Secrets Act
- National Security
