= Bureau of South and Central Asian Affairs =

U.S. State Department division

- Seal of the United States Department of State

Bureau overview
- Formed: 2006; 20 years ago
- Preceding bureau: Bureau of Near Eastern and South Asian Affairs
- Jurisdiction: Executive branch of the United States
- Headquarters: Harry S. Truman Building, Washington, D.C., United States
- Employees: 1,747 (as of FY 2017)
- Annual budget: $820 million (FY 2017)
- Bureau executive: S. Paul Kapur, Assistant Secretary of State for South and Central Asian Affairs
- Parent department: U.S. Department of State
- Website: state.gov/sca

The Bureau of South and Central Asian Affairs (SCA) is an agency within the United States Department of State that is responsible for the U.S. government's relations with countries in the South and Central Asian region. The bureau is headed by the Assistant Secretary of State for South and Central Asian Affairs, who reports to the Secretary of State through the Under Secretary of State for Political Affairs.

== History ==
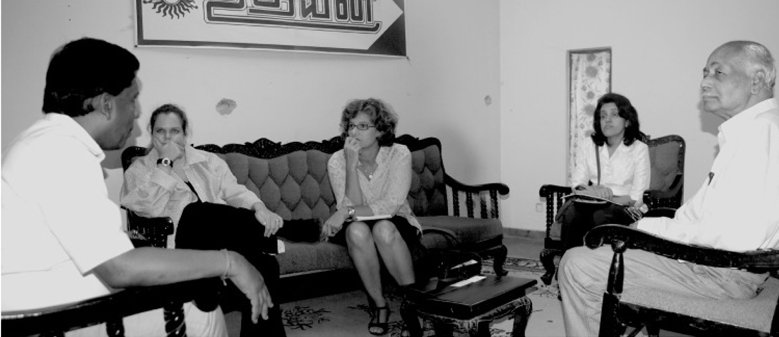
A delegation headed by Ms. Heather Variava (Second from Left), meeting with E. Saravanapavan, M.P.(Far Left), in Jaffna, Sri Lanka.

After six years of trying, Congress allocated the funds to create an independent Bureau of South Asian Affairs in 1991. Pursuant to the Foreign Relations Authorization Act for Fiscal Years 1992 and 1993, the Bureau of South Asian Affairs was established on August 24, 1992, after having been a part of the Bureau of Near Eastern and South Asian Affairs since 1958. In February 2006 the bureau absorbed the Office of Central Asian Affairs from the Bureau of European and Eurasian Affairs.

== Organization ==
The offices of the Bureau of South and Central Asian Affairs direct, coordinate, and supervise U.S. government activities within the region, including political, economic, consular, public diplomacy, and administrative management issues.

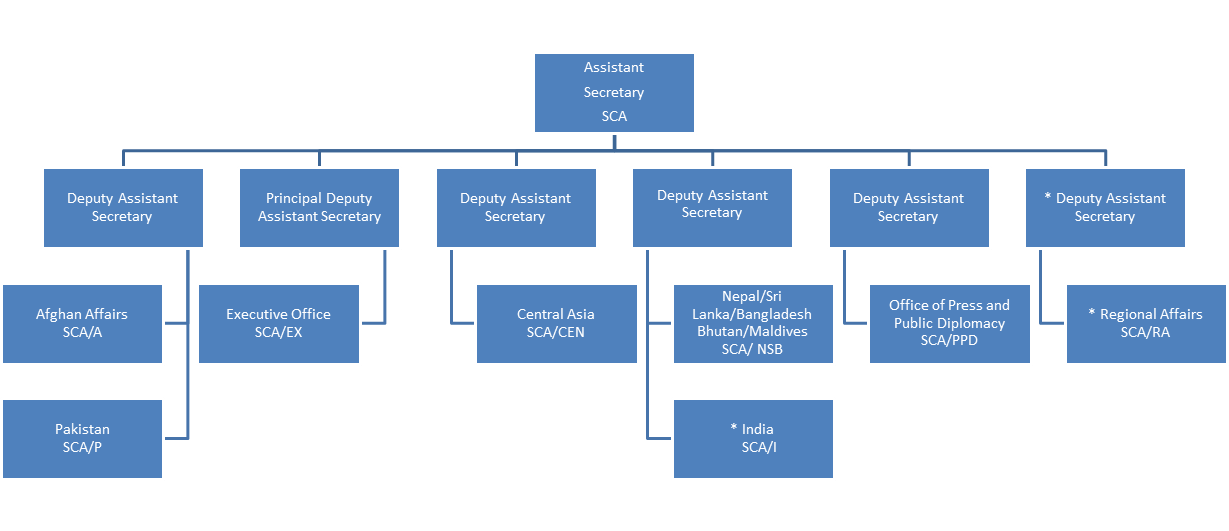
Organizational chart of the Bureau of South and Central Asian Affairs as of 2014

- SCA Front Office – The office of the Assistant Secretary and other principals in the bureau
- Office of India, Nepal, Sri Lanka, Bangladesh, Bhutan, and Maldives Affairs – Informs policy and coordinates with U.S. Missions in India, Nepal, Sri Lanka, Bangladesh, Bhutan, and the Maldives
- Office of Pakistan Affairs – Oversees Pakistan–United States relations, and liaises with the U.S. Embassy in Pakistan
- Office of Central Asian Affairs – Informs policy and coordinates with U.S. Missions in Kazakhstan, Kyrgyzstan, Tajikistan, Turkmenistan, and Uzbekistan
- Office of Press and Public Diplomacy – Coordinates public outreach and digital engagement, and prepares press guidance for the Department Spokesperson in the Bureau of Public Affairs
- Office of Afghanistan Affairs – Oversees Afghanistan–United States relations, and liaises with the U.S. Embassy in Afghanistan

The following offices were cut in 2025:

- Office of Security and Transnational Affairs
