= James Maurice Ealum =

American diplomat (1930–2023)

James Maurice Ealum (December 30, 1930 – April 8, 2023) was an American diplomat who was a career Foreign Service Officer. He served as Chargé d'Affaires ad interim in Afghanistan from March 1986 until September 1987.

Ealum was born in Altus, Oklahoma on December 30, 1930. He graduated from the University of Oklahoma (BA) and Harvard University (MA). He was the first diplomat-in-residence at Oklahoma State University–Stillwater. Ealum died on April 8, 2023, at the age of 92.
