= Assistant Secretary of State for South and Central Asian Affairs =

United States Assistant Secretary of State for South and Central Asian Affairs
- Seal of the United States Department of State

- Flag of an assistant secretary of state

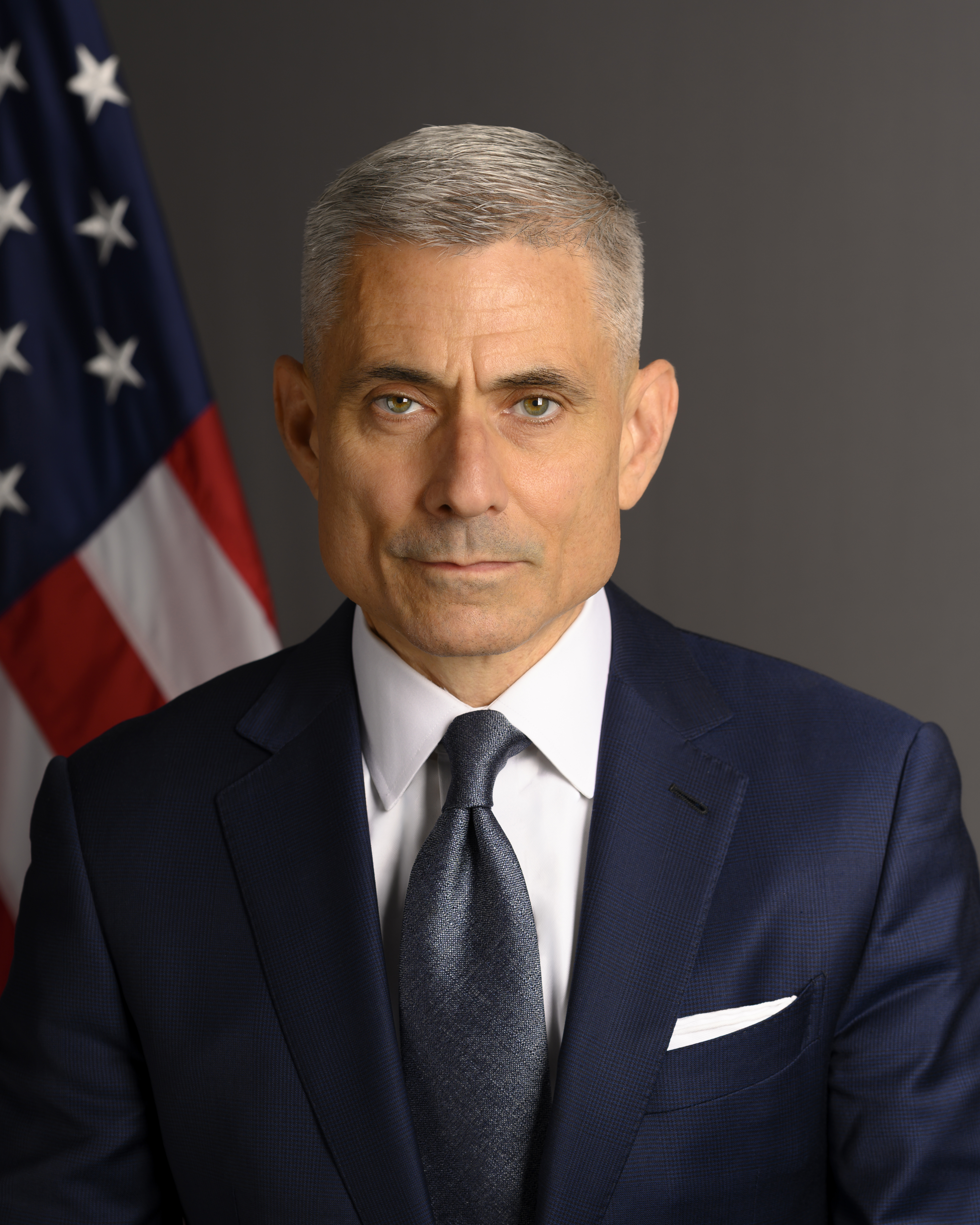
- Incumbent; S. Paul Kapur since October 22, 2025
- Reports to: Under Secretary of State for Political Affairs
- Nominator: President of the United States
- Inaugural holder: Edward Djerejian
- Formation: 1992
- Website: Official Website

The assistant secretary of state for South and Central Asian affairs is the head of the Bureau of South and Central Asian Affairs within the United States Department of State, which handles U.S. foreign policy and relations in the following countries: Afghanistan, Bangladesh, Bhutan, India, Kyrgyzstan, Kazakhstan, Maldives, Nepal, Pakistan, Sri Lanka, Tajikistan, Turkmenistan, and Uzbekistan.

The position of Assistant Secretary of State for South Asian Affairs was renamed when responsibility for policy for five countries (Kazakhstan, Uzbekistan, Kyrgyzstan, Tajikistan, and Turkmenistan) was transferred from the Bureau of European and Eurasian Affairs to the Bureau of South Asian Affairs, which became the Bureau of South and Central Asian Affairs.

== List of assistant secretaries of state for South Asian affairs ==
| # | Name | Assumed office | Left office | President served under |
|---|---|---|---|---|
| - | Edward P. Djerejian | August 24, 1992 | May 30, 1993 | George H. W. Bush and Bill Clinton |
| - | James P. Covey | | | |
| 1 | Robin Raphel | August 6, 1993 | June 27, 1997 | Bill Clinton |
| 2 | Karl Inderfurth | August 4, 1997 | January 19, 2001 | Bill Clinton |
| 3 | Christina B. Rocca | June 1, 2001 | February 17, 2006 | George W. Bush |
| 4 | Richard Boucher | February 21, 2006 | January 20, 2009 | George W. Bush |
| 5 | Robert O. Blake, Jr. | May 26, 2009 | October 20, 2013 | Barack Obama |
| 6 | Nisha Desai Biswal | October 21, 2013 | January 20, 2017 | Barack Obama |
| - | William E. Todd (Acting) | January 20, 2017 | June 12, 2017 | Donald Trump |
| - | Alice G. Wells (Acting) | June 26, 2017 | June 20, 2020 | Donald Trump |
| - | Dean R. Thompson (Acting) | January 20, 2021 | September 15, 2021 | Joe Biden |
| 7 | Donald Lu | September 15, 2021 | January 20, 2025 | Joe Biden |
| - | Eric Meyer (Acting) | January 20, 2025 | August 19, 2025 | Donald Trump |
| - | Bethany Poulos Morrison (Acting) | August 20, 2025 | October 22, 2025 | Donald Trump |
| 8 | S. Paul Kapur | October 22, 2025 | Present | Donald Trump |
