= Douglas H. Paal =

American diplomat

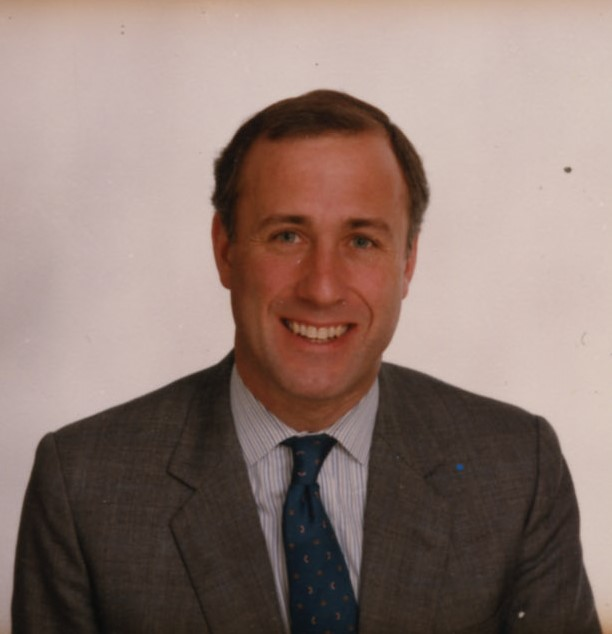
- Paal in 1987
- Occupations: businessman and diplomat
- Spouse: Betsy A. Fitzgerald (m. 1972)
- Children: 2

Douglas Haines Paal (Chinese: 包道格) is vice president for studies at the Carnegie Endowment for International Peace, where he directs the endowment's Asia Program. He served as the director of the American Institute in Taiwan from 2002 to 2006 and worked on the National Security Council staffs of Presidents Reagan and George H. W. Bush between 1986 and 1993 as director of Asian Affairs, senior director, and special assistant to the President. He was vice chairman of JPMorgan Chase International from 2006 to 2008. He also serves as a member of the board of trustees of the Asia Foundation.

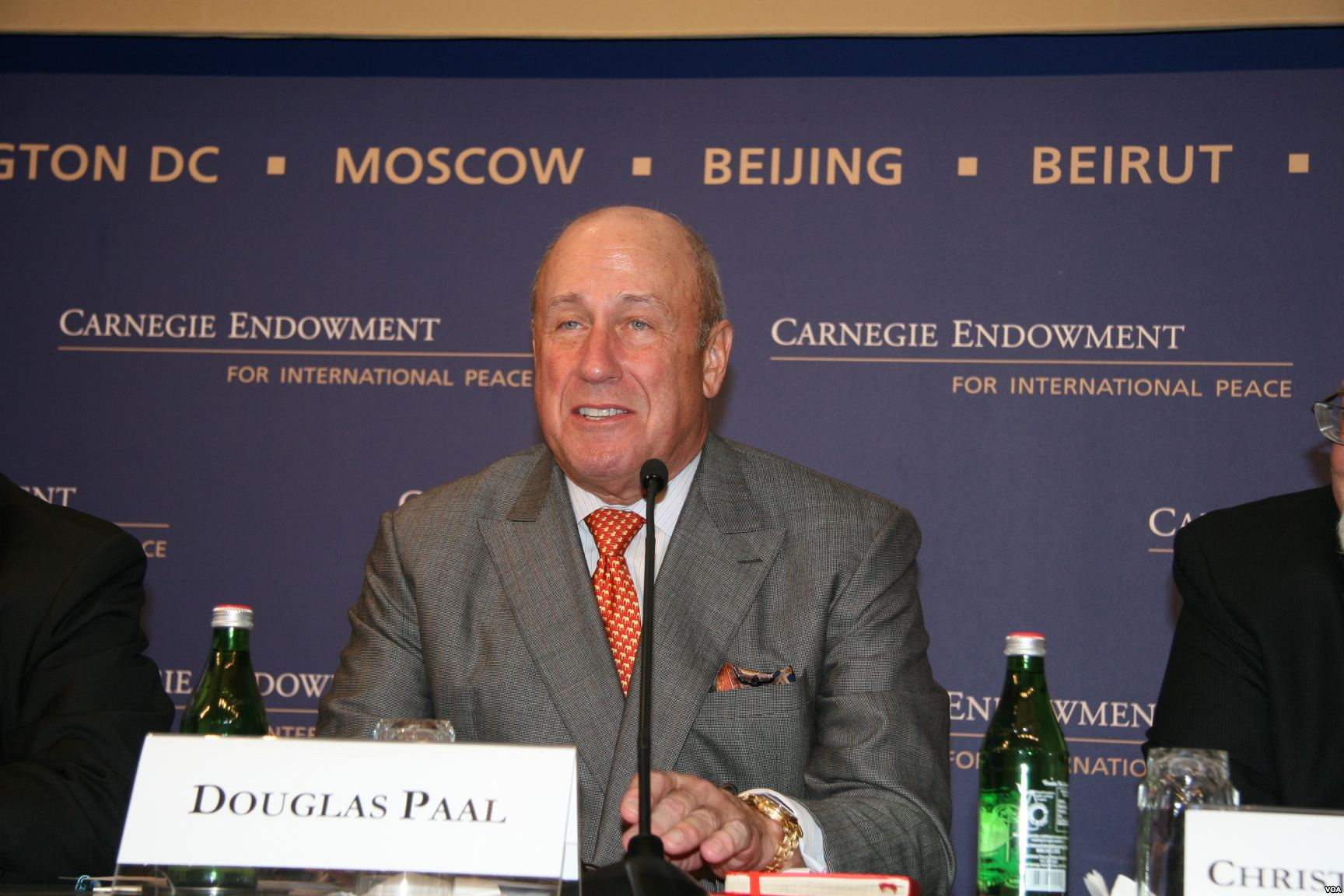
Paal in December 2012

Paal founded the Asia Pacific Policy Center in the mid-1990s, a non-profit research organization that hosted conferences and published a few reports on issues related to U.S. policy in Asia. There were allegations that the organization "functioned less like a think tank than a high-end consultancy or even a lobbying firm. According to former employees, the center's work was almost entirely geared to servicing the needs of its governmental and corporate funders." The list of "'clients,' as they were apparently often called" included the government of Malaysia, which was thought to have given millions of dollars in contributions. The abuse of non-profit status was heavily discussed in the lead-up to Paal's nomination as director of AIT, and helped to delay his appointment.

Prior to his service on the National Security Council, Paal worked on the U.S. State Department Policy Planning Staff and at the U.S. Embassies in Singapore and Beijing. He also worked as a senior analyst and Deputy National Intelligence Officer for the CIA. He served as a U.S. Navy officer in Vietnam and studied Japanese in Tokyo, after graduating with bachelor's and master's degrees in Chinese Studies and Asian History from Brown University and a PhD in History and East Asian Languages from Harvard University.

Paal has written and spoken widely on U.S. policy in Asia and Asian affairs, his articles and interviews being published and broadcast by The New York Times, The Wall Street Journal, South China Morning Post, The National Interest, Korea Times, The Washington Times, Far Eastern Economic Review, RIA Novosti, World Politics Review, C-SPAN, BBC, PBS, and CCTV. He has also published numerous commentaries and policy papers through the Carnegie Endowment for International Peace.

In 2020, Paal, along with over 130 other former Republican national security officials, signed a statement that asserted that President Trump was unfit to serve another term, and "To that end, we are firmly convinced that it is in the best interest of our nation that Vice President Joe Biden be elected as the next President of the United States, and we will vote for him."

Paal resides with his wife, Betsy A. Fitzgerald, in Bethesda, Maryland. They have two daughters, Alice, who served as a Peace Corps volunteer in Mauritania, and Victoria, a lawyer in San Francisco.

== Bibliography ==
- "The Rise of China and Alliance in East Asia: Implications for Diplomatic Truce," Keynote Remarks, 39th Taiwan-American Conference on Contemporary China, Taipei, Taiwan, December 9, 2010, available at
- "China Shops at Pottery Barn," The National Interest, November 24, 2010
- "The Cheonan Attack," The National Interest, June 3, 2010
- "Obama Welcomes the Dalai Lama, Behind Closed Doors," South China Morning Post, February 18, 2010
- "The Clintons' High-Return Diplomacy," The New York Times, August 6, 2009
- "North Korea: Time for Strategy," Korea Times, April 3, 2009
- "Rice's ASEAN 'Gardening'," Wall Street Journal Asia, July 24, 2008
- "Asia--Shaping the Future," Policy Brief No. 62 (Carnegie, June 2008)
- "The United States in Asia in 1999: Ending the 20th Century," Asian Survey, Vol. 40, No. 1 (Jan./Feb. 2000), pp. 1–15
- "China and the East Asian Security Environment: Complementarity and Competition," in Living with China: U.S.-China Relations in the Twenty-first Century, Ezra F. Vogel, ed. (New York: W.W. Norton & Co., 1997)

Diplomatic posts
Preceded by Raymond Burghardt	Director of the American Institute in Taiwan; 2002–2006	Succeeded by Stephen Young
